= 2026 Campeonato Pernambucano =

Football competition

Campeonato Pernambucano
- Season: 2026
- Dates: 9 January – 8 March
- Champions: Sport
- Relegated: Jaguar (2027 first stage)
- 2027 Copa do Brasil: Náutico; Retrô; Santa Cruz; Sport
- 2027 Copa do Nordeste: Náutico; Sport
- 2027 Série D: Decisão; Retrô
- Matches: 38
- Goals: 111 (2.92 per match)

The 2026 Campeonato Pernambucano (officially the Campeonato Pernambucano da Série A1 2026) was the 112th edition of the state championship of Pernambuco organized by FPF. The championship began on 9 January and ended on 8 March 2026. Sport are the defending champions.

== Format ==
In the first stage, each team will play each of the other seven teams once in a round-robin tournament. The top two teams will advance to the semi-finals, and the teams ranked third through sixth will advance to the quarter-finals. The team that finishes bottom of the first stage will play in the first stage of the 2027 Campeonato Pernambucano.

The champions and the runners-up will qualify for the 2027 Copa do Brasil and the 2027 Copa do Nordeste, while the third and fourth placed teams will also qualify for the 2027 Copa do Brasil. The top two teams not already qualified for the 2027 Série A, Série B or Série C will qualify for the 2027 Série D.

== Teams ==
A total of eight teams will be competing, including seven that returned from the 2025 tournament and one that was promoted from the 2025 Pernambucano Série A2: Vitória das Tabocas.

Club	City	Manager	Stadium
Decisão	Goiana	Kinho Forgiarini	José Dionísio do Carmo
Jaguar	Jaboatão dos Guararapes	Alex Faustino	Arena Pernambuco (São Lourenço da Mata)
Maguary	Bonito	Sued Lima	Arthur Tavares de Melo
Náutico	Recife	Hélio dos Anjos and Guilherme dos Anjos	Aflitos
Retrô	Camaragibe	Jamesson	Arena Pernambuco (São Lourenço da Mata)
Santa Cruz	Recife	Fábio Cortez	Arena Pernambuco (São Lourenço da Mata)^{[a]}
Sport	Recife	Roger	Ilha do Retiro
Vitória das Tabocas	Vitória de Santo Antão	Eudes Pedro	Arena Pernambuco (São Lourenço da Mata)

^{a} Santa Cruz played their home matches at Arena Pernambuco instead of their regular stadium Arruda, Recife.

== First stage ==
In the first stage, each team played the other seven teams in a single round-robin tournament. The teams were ranked according to points (3 points for a win, 1 point for a draw, and 0 points for a loss). If tied on points, the following criteria would be used to determine the ranking: 1. Wins; 2. Goal difference; 3. Goals scored; 4. Fewest red cards; 5. Fewest yellow cards; 6. Draw in the headquarters of the FPF.

Top two teams advanced to the semi-finals of the final stages, while teams from third to sixth places advanced to the quarter-finals. The bottom team will play in the first stage of the 2027 Campeonato Pernambucano. This decision aligns with the merger of the Pernambucano Série A1 and the Pernambucano A2 into a single tournament, with the first stage of the new tournament replacing the Série A2.

=== Group A ===
Pos	Team	Pld	W	D	L	GF	GA	GD	Pts	Qualification
1	Náutico	7	6	0	1	19	4	+15	18	Advance to semi-finals and qualify for 2027 Copa do Brasil
2	Sport	7	4	2	1	15	8	+7	14	Advance to semi-finals and qualify for 2027 Copa do Brasil
3	Retrô	7	3	2	2	8	5	+3	11	Advance to quarter-finals
4	Santa Cruz	7	3	1	3	12	8	+4	10	Advance to quarter-finals
5	Decisão	7	3	0	4	8	17	−9	9	Advance to quarter-finals
6	Maguary	7	2	3	2	10	10	0	9	Advance to quarter-finals
7	Vitória das Tabocas	7	1	1	5	7	14	−7	4	
8	Jaguar	7	0	3	4	5	18	−13	3	Relegation to 2027 Pernambucano first stage

Source: FPF

==== Results ====
Home \ Away	DEC	JAG	MAG	NAU	RET	SAN	SPO	VIT
Decisão		2–0		1–2				0–4
Jaguar			1–2	0–4			2–2	
Maguary	3–4				1–1	1–1	1–1	
Náutico			2–0		0–1		4–0	
Retrô	0–1	1–1				1–0		4–0
Santa Cruz	3–0	6–0		0–4				1–0
Sport	5–0				2–0	2–1		3–0
Vitória das Tabocas		1–1	0–2	2–3				

Source: FPF
Legend: Blue = home team win; Yellow = draw; Red = away team win.

== Final stages ==
Starting from the quarter-finals, the teams will play a single-elimination tournament with the following rules:

- The stages will be played on a home-and-away two-legged basis, with the higher-seeded team hosting the second leg.
  - If tied on aggregate, the penalty shoot-out will be used to determine the winners.
- Extra time will not be played and away goals rule will not be used in final stages.

=== Bracket ===
Quarter-finals
6	Maguary	1	1	2
3	Retrô	1	2	3
5	Decisão	1	0	1
4	Santa Cruz	2	1	3

Semi-finals
3	Retrô	0	2	2
2	Sport	1	3	4
4	Santa Cruz	0	0	0
1	Náutico	1	2	3

Finals
2	Sport	3	3	6
1	Náutico	3	0	3

=== Quarter-finals ===
Team 1	Agg.	Team 2	1st leg	2nd leg
Maguary	2–3	Retrô	1–1	1–2
Decisão	1–3	Santa Cruz	1–2	0–1

==== Group B ====
4 February 2026
16:30

Maguary	1–1	Retrô
Francisco Chagas 11'	Report	Vágner Love 87'

Estádio Arthur Tavares de Melo, Bonito
Referee: Diego Fernando Silva de Lima

7 February 2026
18:00

Retrô	2–1	Maguary
Ericson 63'; Vágner Love 65'		Iago Felipe 35'

Estádio dos Aflitos, Recife
Referee: Deborah Cecilia Cruz Correia

Retrô qualified for the 2027 Copa do Brasil.

==== Group C ====
5 February 2026
16:30

Decisão	1–2	Santa Cruz
Bambam 84'	Report	Israel 12'; Matheus Vinicius 43'

Estádio José Dionísio do Carmo, Goiana
Referee: Michelangelo Martins de Almeida Júnior

8 February 2026
18:00

Santa Cruz	1–0	Decisão
Patrick Allan 50'

Estádio do Arruda, Recife
Referee: Hugo Soares Dias Figueiredo

Santa Cruz qualified for the 2027 Copa do Brasil.

=== Semi-finals ===
Team 1	Agg.	Team 2	1st leg	2nd leg
Santa Cruz	0–3	Náutico	0–1	0–2
Retrô	2–4	Sport	0–1	2–3

==== Group D ====
11 February 2026
20:00

Santa Cruz	0–1	Náutico
		Paulo Sérgio 17'

Arena Pernambuco, São Lourenço da Mata
Referee: Bruno Arleu de Araújo (Rio de Janeiro)

22 February 2026
18:00

Náutico	2–0	Santa Cruz
Paulo Sérgio 45+6' (pen.), 72'

Estádio dos Aflitos, Recife
Referee: Paulo César Zanovelli da Silva (Minas Gerais)

Náutico qualified for the 2027 Copa do Nordeste.

==== Group E ====
12 February 2026
17:00

Retrô	0–1	Sport
		Gustavo Maia 53'

Estádio dos Aflitos, Recife
Referee: Anderson Luís Marques

21 February 2026
16:30

Sport	3–2	Retrô
Ramon Menezes 7'; Benevenuto 72'; Max Alves 87'		Diego Guerra 17'; Luiz Henrique 25'

Estádio Ilha do Retiro, Recife
Referee: Rodrigo José Pereira de Lima

Sport qualified for the 2027 Copa do Nordeste.

=== Finals ===
Team 1	Agg.	Team 2	1st leg	2nd leg
Sport	6–3	Náutico	3–3	3–0

==== Group F ====
1 March 2026
18:00

Sport	3–3	Náutico
Iury Castilho 45+2', 64'; Yago Felipe 90'		Paulo Sérgio 21' (pen.); Benevenuto 53' (o.g.); Wanderson 90+5'

Estádio Ilha do Retiro, Recife
Referee: Marcelo de Lima Henrique (Ceará)

Sport	Náutico

GK	26	(Brazil) Thiago Couto
DF	68	(Brazil) Augusto Pucci
DF	5	(Brazil) Benevenuto	(yellow card) 80'
DF	40	(Brazil) Ramon Menezes
DF	66	(Brazil) Felipinho
MF	23	(Brazil) Zé Gabriel
MF	48	(Brazil) Pedro Martins		(substituted off) 68'
MF	31	(Brazil) Marlon Douglas		(substituted off) 67'
FW	30	(Brazil) Chrystian Barletta		(substituted off) 73'
FW	95	(Brazil) Iury Castilho	(yellow card) 20'	(substituted off) 78'
FW	99	(Brazil) Zé Roberto (c)		(substituted off) 68'
Substitutes:
GK	42	(Brazil) Adriano Sousa
DF	2	(Brazil) Matheus Alexandre
DF	3	(Brazil) Marcelo Ajul
DF	29	(Brazil) Davi Gabriel
MF	7	(Brazil) Yago Felipe		(substituted on) 73'
MF	8	(Brazil) Max Alves		(substituted on) 68'
MF	10	(Uruguay) Carlos de Pena
MF	54	(Brazil) Adriel
MF	58	(Brazil) Zé Lucas		(substituted on) 68'
FW	9	(Brazil) Gustavo Coutinho		(substituted on) 78'
FW	11	(Brazil) Gustavo Maia		(substituted on) 67'
FW	25	(Brazil) Clayson
Coach:
(Brazil) Roger

GK	1	(Brazil) Muriel
DF	2	(Brazil) Arnaldo		(substituted off) 57'
DF	43	(Brazil) Wanderson
DF	23	(Brazil) Igor Fernandes
DF	6	(Brazil) Yuri
MF	41	(Brazil) Samuel Félix
MF	8	(Brazil) Wenderson		(substituted off) 62'
MF	10	(Brazil) Dodô		(substituted off) 75'
FW	29	(Brazil) Júnior Todinho		(substituted off) 75'
FW	7	(Brazil) Vinícius (c)
FW	9	(Brazil) Paulo Sérgio	(yellow card) 23'	(substituted off) 57'
Substitutes:
GK	55	(Uruguay) Gastón Guruceaga
DF	13	(Brazil) Índio
DF	66	(Brazil) Léo Jance
DF	93	(Brazil) Reginaldo		(substituted on) 57'
MF	5	(Brazil) Auremir
MF	11	(Brazil) Juninho		(substituted on) 75'
MF	27	(Brazil) Luiz Felipe	(yellow card) 90+4'	(substituted on) 62'
MF	40	(Brazil) Ramon Carvalho	(yellow card) 79'	(substituted on) 75'
FW	17	(Brazil) Jonas Toró
FW	31	(Brazil) Rosa
FW	34	(Nigeria) Samuel Otusanya		(substituted on) 57'
FW	98	(Brazil) Felipe Saraiva
Coaches:
(Brazil) Hélio dos Anjos (Brazil) Guilherme dos Anjos

Assistant referees:
Nailton Júnior de Sousa Oliveira (Ceará)
Luiz Cláudio Regazone (Rio de Janeiro)
Fourth official:
Gleika Oliveira Pinheiro (Pará)
Fifth official:
Francisco de Assis da Hora (Rio Grande do Norte)
Video assistant referee:
Rodrigo Guarizo Ferreira do Amaral (São Paulo)
Assistant video assistant referees:
Lilian da Silva Fernandes Bruno (São Paulo)

8 March 2026
18:00

Náutico	0–3	Sport
		Iury Castilho 14', 90+8' (pen.); Augusto Pucci 42'

Estádio dos Aflitos, Recife
Referee: Paulo César Zanovelli (Minas Gerais)

Náutico	Sport

GK	1	(Brazil) Muriel
DF	2	(Brazil) Arnaldo	(yellow card) 23'	(substituted off) 46'
DF	43	(Brazil) Wanderson
DF	23	(Brazil) Igor Fernandes
DF	6	(Brazil) Yuri	(yellow card) 70'
MF	5	(Brazil) Auremir		(substituted off) 46'
MF	8	(Brazil) Wenderson		(substituted off) 69'
MF	10	(Brazil) Dodô	(red card) 39'
FW	29	(Brazil) Júnior Todinho		(substituted off) 46'
FW	7	(Brazil) Vinícius (c)
FW	9	(Brazil) Paulo Sérgio
Substitutes:
GK	55	(Uruguay) Gastón Guruceaga
DF	13	(Brazil) Índio
DF	25	(Brazil) Mateus Silva
DF	66	(Brazil) Léo Jance
DF	93	(Brazil) Reginaldo		(substituted on) 46'
MF	11	(Brazil) Juninho		(substituted on) 69'
MF	27	(Brazil) Luiz Felipe	(yellow card) 85'	(substituted on) 46'
MF	40	(Brazil) Ramon Carvalho
MF	41	(Brazil) Samuel Félix
FW	31	(Brazil) Rosa			(substituted on) 81'
FW	34	(Nigeria) Samuel Otusanya
FW	98	(Brazil) Felipe Saraiva		(substituted on) 46'	(substituted off) 81'
Coaches:
(Brazil) Hélio dos Anjos (Brazil) Guilherme dos Anjos

GK	26	(Brazil) Thiago Couto
DF	68	(Brazil) Augusto Pucci
DF	5	(Brazil) Benevenuto
DF	3	(Brazil) Marcelo Ajul
DF	60	(Brazil) Felipinho
MF	23	(Brazil) Zé Gabriel	(yellow card) 18'	(substituted off) 46'
MF	58	(Brazil) Zé Lucas	(yellow card) 81'
MF	7	(Brazil) Yago Felipe (c)		(substituted off) 53'
FW	30	(Brazil) Chrystian Barletta		(substituted off) 80'
FW	11	(Brazil) Gustavo Maia		(substituted off) 68'
FW	95	(Brazil) Iury Castilho
Substitutes:
GK	1	(Brazil) Halls
DF	2	(Brazil) Matheus Alexandre
DF	29	(Brazil) Davi Gabriel
DF	40	(Brazil) Ramon Menezes
MF	8	(Brazil) Max Alves		(substituted on) 80'
MF	10	(Uruguay) Carlos de Pena			(substituted on) 68'
MF	48	(Brazil) Pedro Martins	(yellow card) 67'	(substituted on) 46'	(substituted off) 68'
FW	9	(Brazil) Gustavo Coutinho
FW	25	(Brazil) Clayson		(substituted on) 68'
FW	31	(Brazil) Marlon Douglas		(substituted on) 53'
FW	77	(Brazil) Micael
FW	99	(Brazil) Zé Roberto
Coach:
(Brazil) Roger

Assistant referees:
Rodrigo Figueiredo Henrique Corrêa (Rio de Janeiro)
Eduardo Gonçalves da Cruz (Mato Grosso do Sul)
Fourth official:
Rejane Caetano da Silva (Ceará)
Fifth official:
Luís Filipe Gonçalves Corrêa (Paraíba)
Video assistant referee:
Pablo Ramon Gonçalves Pinheiro (Rio Grande do Norte)
Assistant video assistant referees:
Fabrício Porfírio de Moura (São Paulo)

== Overall table ==
Pos	Team	Pld	W	D	L	GF	GA	GD	Pts	Qualification or relegation
1	Sport	11	7	3	1	25	13	+12	24	Champions and 2027 Copa do Brasil
2	Náutico	11	8	1	2	25	10	+15	25	Runners-up and 2027 Copa do Brasil
3	Retrô	11	4	3	4	13	11	+2	15	2027 Copa do Brasil and 2027 Série D
4	Santa Cruz	11	5	1	5	15	12	+3	16	2027 Copa do Brasil
5	Decisão	9	3	0	6	9	20	−11	9	2027 Série D
6	Maguary	9	2	4	3	12	13	−1	10	
7	Vitória das Tabocas	7	1	1	5	7	14	−7	4	
8	Jaguar	7	0	3	4	5	18	−13	3	Relegation to 2027 Pernambucano first stage

Source: FPF
