= 2026 Sport Club do Recife season =

Sport Recife
2026 season
- Chairman: Matheus Souto Maior
- Manager: Roger Silva (until 23 March); Márcio Goiano (24 March–29 June); Gilmar Dal Pozzo (30 June–6 September); Mariano Soso (from 9 September)
- Stadium: Ilha do Retiro
- Série B: 9th
- Pernambucano: Champions (46th title)
- Copa do Brasil: Fourth round
- Copa do Nordeste: Semi-finals
- Top goalscorer: League: Pedro Perotti (15); All: Chrystian Barletta and Pedro Perotti (17)
Home colours	Away colours	Third colours

The 2026 season was Sport Recife's 122nd season in the club's history. Sport competed in Série B, Copa do Nordeste, Copa do Brasil and Campeonato Pernambucano.

== Squad ==
As of 17 September 2026

Note: Flags indicate national team as defined under FIFA eligibility rules; some limited exceptions apply. Players may hold more than one non-FIFA nationality.

No.	Pos.	Nation	Player
3	DF	BRA	Marcelo Ajul
5	DF	BRA	Marcelo Benevenuto
6	MF	BRA	Biel (on loan from Brusque)
7	MF	BRA	Patrick de Paula
8	MF	BRA	Juan Alano
9	FW	BRA	Pedro Perotti (on loan from Chapecoense)
10	FW	URU	Carlos de Pena
12	GK	BRA	Denis
15	MF	BRA	Murilo Rhikman (on loan from Cruzeiro)
19	FW	BRA	Neto Pessoa
20	FW	URU	Diego Hernández
21	GK	BRA	Brenno
23	MF	BRA	Zé Gabriel
25	FW	BRA	Clayson
26	GK	BRA	Thiago Couto
27	DF	BRA	Claudinho (on loan from Vitória)

No.	Pos.	Nation	Player
28	DF	BRA	Habraão (on loan from Athletico Paranaense)
29	MF	BRA	Willian Oliveira
30	FW	BRA	Chrystian Barletta
31	FW	BRA	Marlon Douglas
33	DF	BRA	Kayky Almeida (on loan from Fluminense)
42	GK	BRA	Adriano
47	MF	BRA	Fábio Matheus
48	MF	BRA	Pedro Martins
60	DF	BRA	Felipinho
63	DF	BRA	Patrick
68	DF	BRA	Augusto Pucci
76	DF	BRA	Raí Lopes
77	FW	BRA	Dudu Teodora
88	MF	BRA	Fernando Sobral
96	DF	BRA	Edson Lucas (on loan from Ferroviária)
—	MF	VEN	Kervin Andrade (on loan from Maccabi Tel Aviv)

== Statistics ==
=== Goalscorers ===
Place	Pos.	Nat.	No.	Name	Campeonato Pernambucano	Copa do Brasil	Copa do Nordeste	Série B	Total
1	FW	(Brazil)	30	Chrystian Barletta	1	0	2	14	17
1	FW	(Brazil)	9	Pedro Perotti	0	0	2	15	17
2	FW	(Brazil)	95	Iury Castilho	4	1	2	1	8
3	FW	(Uruguay)	10	Carlos de Pena	0	0	2	3	5
4	MF	(Brazil)	6	Biel	0	0	2	2	4
4	DF	(Brazil)	3	Marcelo Ajul	2	1	0	1	4
5	MF	(Uruguay)	20	Diego Hernández	0	0	0	3	3
5	DF	(Brazil)	60	Felipinho	1	0	1	1	3
5	FW	(Brazil)	9	Gustavo Coutinho	3	0	0	0	3
5	MF	(Brazil)	11	Gustavo Maia	2	0	1	0	3
5	FW	(Brazil)	19	Neto Pessoa	0	0	0	3	3
6	DF	(Brazil)	68	Augusto Pucci	1	0	0	1	2
6	MF	(Brazil)	25	Clayson	0	0	1	1	2
6	FW	(Brazil)	71	Lipão	2	0	0	0	2
6	DF	(Brazil)	5	Marcelo Benevenuto	1	0	0	1	2
6	FW	(Brazil)	9	Micael	2	0	0	0	2
6	MF	(Brazil)	7	Patrick de Paula	0	0	0	2	2
7	DF	(Brazil)	27	Claudinho	0	0	0	1	1
7	MF	(Brazil)	47	Fábio	0	0	0	1	1
7	DF	(Brazil)	48	Felype Gabriel	1	0	0	0	1
7	DF	(Brazil)	28	Habraão	0	0	1	0	1
7	DF	(Brazil)	13	Madson	0	0	0	1	1
7	FW	(Brazil)	31	Marlon	0	0	0	1	1
7	MF	(Brazil)	8	Max Alves	1	0	0	0	1
7	DF	(Brazil)	40	Ramon	1	0	0	0	1
7	MF	(Brazil)	7	Yago Felipe	1	0	0	0	1
7	FW	(Brazil)	99	Zé Roberto	1	0	0	0	1
				Own goals	1	0	0	1	2
				Total	25	2	14	53	94

=== Managers performance ===
Name	From	To	P	W	D	L	GF	GA	Avg%	Ref
(Brazil) Alexandre Oliveira (c)	10 January 2026	18 January 2026	3	1	1	1	4	6	44%	
(Brazil) Roger Silva	21 January 2026	21 March 2026	12	6	5	1	23	11	63%	
(Brazil) Márcio Goiano	24 March 2026	28 June 2026	22	12	6	4	32	17	63%	
(Brazil) Gilmar Dal Pozzo	4 July 2026	5 September 2026	11	3	4	4	16	15	39%	
(Argentina) Mariano Soso	10 September 2026	14 November 2026	11	6	2	3	17	13	60%	
(Brazil) Sued Lima (c)	6 November 2026	6 November 2026	1	0	0	1	2	3	0%	

(c) Indicates the caretaker manager

=== Overall record ===
Competition	First match	Last match	Starting round	Final position	Record							
Competition	First match	Last match	Starting round	Final position	Pld	W	D	L	GF	GA	GD	Win %
Pernambucano	10 January	8 March	First stage	Winners	11	7	3	1	25	13	+12	63.64
Copa do Brasil	5 March	17 March	Second round	Fourth round	3	0	2	1	2	4	−2	0.00
Série B	21 March	14 November	Matchday 1	9th	38	15	13	10	53	42	+11	39.47
Copa do Nordeste	24 March	27 May	Group stage	Semi-finals	8	6	0	2	14	6	+8	75.00
Total					60	28	18	14	94	65	+29	46.67

Last updated: 14 November 2026
Source: Competitions

== Competitions ==
=== Campeonato Pernambucano ===
==== First stage ====
10 January 2026 1	Jaguar	2–2	Sport	São Lourenço da Mata
17:00 (UTC-3)	Edson Pernambuco 14'; Paulo Miranda 41'	Report	Felype Gabriel 38'; Lipão 52'	Stadium: Estádio Governador Carlos Wilson Campos (Arena Pernambuco); Attendance: 1,998; Referee: Deborah Cecília

14 January 2026 2	Sport	2–0	Retrô	Recife
21:30 (UTC-3)	Micael 14'; Lipão 39'	Report		Stadium: Estádio Adelmar da Costa Carvalho (Ilha do Retiro); Attendance: 7,757; Referee: Rodrigo José Pereira de Lima

18 January 2026 3	Náutico	4–0	Sport	Recife
18:00 (UTC-3)	Dodô 24'; Vinícius 66'; Paulo Sérgio 72', 86'	Report		Stadium: Estádio Eládio de Barros Carvalho (Aflitos); Attendance: 13,869; Referee: Diego Fernando Silva

21 January 2026 4	Sport	5–0	Decisão	Recife
19:00 (UTC-3)	Chrystian Barletta 26'; Gustavo Maia 45+1'; Marcelo Ajul 54'; Felipinho 64'; Zé Roberto 84'	Report		Stadium: Estádio Adelmar da Costa Carvalho (Ilha do Retiro); Attendance: 7,647; Referee: Tiago Nascimento

24 January 2026 5	Sport	3–0	Vitória das Tabocas	Recife
17:00 (UTC-3)	Gustavo Coutinho 48'; Léo Gaúcho 63' (o.g.); Marcelo Ajul 90+1'	Report		Stadium: Estádio Adelmar da Costa Carvalho (Ilha do Retiro); Attendance: 6,748; Referee: Michelangelo Almeida

28 January 2026 6	Maguary	1–1	Sport	Bonito
15:00 (UTC-3)	Italo 4' (pen.)	Report	Gustavo Coutinho 82' (pen.)	Stadium: Estádio Arthur Tavares Melo; Attendance: 1,323; Referee: Tiago Nascimento

31 January 2026 7	Sport	2–1	Santa Cruz	Recife
16:30 (UTC-3)	Gustavo Coutinho 36' (pen.); Micael 90+1'	Report	Eurico 39'	Stadium: Estádio Adelmar da Costa Carvalho (Ilha do Retiro); Attendance: 20,631; Referee: Paulo Belence

==== Semi-finals ====
12 February 2026 First leg	Retrô	0–1	Sport	Recife
17:00 (UTC-3)		Report	Gustavo Maia 53'	Stadium: Estádio Eládio de Barros Carvalho (Aflitos); Attendance: 920; Referee: Anderson Luís Marques

21 February 2026 Second leg	Sport	3–2	Retrô	Recife
16:00 (UTC-3)	Ramon 8'; Marcelo Benevenuto 27'; Max Alves 87'	Report	Diego Guerra 18'; Luiz Henrique 25'	Stadium: Estádio Adelmar da Costa Carvalho (Ilha do Retiro); Attendance: 15,329; Referee: Rodrigo Pereira

==== Finals ====
1 March 2026 First leg	Sport	3–3	Náutico	Recife
18:00 (UTC-3)	Iury Castilho 45+2', 64'; Yago Felipe 90'	Report	Paulo Sérgio 21' (pen.); Marcelo Benevenuto 53' (o.g.); Wenderson 90+5'	Stadium: Estádio Adelmar da Costa Carvalho (Ilha do Retiro); Attendance: 24,605; Referee: Marcelo de Lima Henrique

8 March 2026 Second leg	Náutico	0–3	Sport	Recife
18:00 (UTC-3)		Report	Iury Castilho 14', 90+8' (pen.); Augusto Pucci 42'	Stadium: Estádio Eládio de Barros Carvalho (Aflitos); Attendance: 17,661; Referee: Paulo César Zanovelli

=== Copa do Brasil ===
==== Second round ====
5 March 2026	Desportiva Ferroviária	0–0 (3–4 p)	Sport	Cariacica
19:00 (UTC-3)		Report		Stadium: Estádio Estadual Kleber José de Andrade; Attendance: 6,433; Referee: Sávio Pereira Sampaio
	Penalties
	Tiago Moura (penalty missed); Gilberto Bahia (penalty scored); Guilherme (penalty scored); Jorge Mendes (penalty missed); Vinicius Leandro (penalty scored)		(penalty missed) Iury Castilho; (penalty scored) Zé Roberto; (penalty scored) Clayson; (penalty scored) Chrystian Barletta; (penalty scored) Felipinho

==== Third round ====
12 March 2026	Sport	1–1 (5–3 p)	Anápolis	Recife
21:30 (UTC-3)	Marcelo Ajul 41'	Report	João Borim 13'	Stadium: Estádio Adelmar da Costa Carvalho (Ilha do Retiro); Attendance: 12,971; Referee: Bruno Mota Correia
	Penalties
	Zé Roberto (penalty scored); Carlos de Pena (penalty scored); Clayson (penalty scored); Marlon (penalty scored); Felipinho (penalty scored)		(penalty scored) Matheus Lagoa; (penalty missed) Fernandinho; (penalty scored) Paulo Henrique; (penalty scored) Caique

==== Fourth round ====
17 March 2026	Sport	1–3	Athletic	Recife
21:30 (UTC-3)	Iury Castilho 60'	Report	Dixon Vera 4'; Ronaldo Tavares 66', 90+5'	Stadium: Estádio Adelmar da Costa Carvalho (Ilha do Retiro); Attendance: 12,270; Referee: Lucas Casagrande

=== Copa do Nordeste ===
==== Group stage ====
24 March 2026 1	Sport	2–1	Jacuipense	Recife
21:30 (UTC-3)	de Pena 57'; Biel 86'	Report	Adriano Junior 82'	Stadium: Estádio Adelmar da Costa Carvalho (Ilha do Retiro); Attendance: 5,121; Referee: Márcio dos Santos Oliveira

29 March 2026 2	ABC	0–1	Sport	Natal
17:00 (UTC-3)		Report	Biel 59'	Stadium: Estádio Maria Lamas Farache (Frasqueirão); Attendance: 4,374; Referee: Emerson Ricardo de Almeida

8 April 2026 3	Sport	3–0	Retrô	Recife
21:30 (UTC-3)	Iury Castilho 59'; Chrystian Barletta 73'; Habraão 76'	Report		Stadium: Estádio Adelmar da Costa Carvalho (Ilha do Retiro); Attendance: 4,617; Referee: Dênis da Silva Ribeiro Serafim

15 April 2026 4	Sport	5–0	Maranhão	Recife
21:30 (UTC-3)	de Pena 26' (pen.); Gustavo Maia 43'; Iury Castilho 79'; Chrystian Barletta 85'; Clayson 90+4'	Report		Stadium: Estádio Adelmar da Costa Carvalho (Ilha do Retiro); Attendance: 4,467; Referee: Douglas Magno de Melo Pereira

29 April 2026 5	Fortaleza	2–0	Sport	Fortaleza
21:30 (UTC-3)	Miritello 90+2'; Vitinho 90+7'	Report		Stadium: Estádio Governador Plácido Castelo (Castelão); Attendance: 5,465; Referee: Afro Rocha de Carvalho Filho

==== Quarter-final ====
6 May 2026	Sport	1–0	ASA de Arapiraca	Recife
21:30 (UTC-3)	Felipinho 78'	Report		Stadium: Estádio Adelmar da Costa Carvalho (Ilha do Retiro); Attendance: 7.811; Referee: Wagner Francisco Silva Souza

==== Semi-finals ====
20 May 2026	Fortaleza	1–2	Sport	Fortaleza
21:00 (UTC-3)	Luiz Fernando 72'	Report	Pedro Perotti 9', 45'	Stadium: Estádio Governador Plácido Castelo (Castelão); Attendance: 9,289; Referee: Emerson Ricardo de Almeida Andrade

27 May 2026	Sport	0–2	Fortaleza	Recife
21:30 (UTC-3)		Report	Miritello 35'; Vitinho 56'	Stadium: Estádio Adelmar da Costa Carvalho (Ilha do Retiro); Attendance: 19,832; Referee: Dênis da Silva Ribeiro Serafim

=== Série B ===
==== League table ====
Pos	Team	Pld	W	D	L	GF	GA	GD	Pts
7	CRB	38	17	8	13	58	52	+6	59
8	Goiás	38	17	7	14	39	44	−5	58
9	Sport	38	15	13	10	53	42	+11	58
10	Operário Ferroviário	38	16	9	13	51	50	+1	57
11	São Bernardo	38	14	11	13	54	44	+10	53

Source: CBF
Rules for classification: 1) points; 2) wins; 3) goal difference; 4) goals scored; 5) head-to-head results (only between 2 teams); 6) fewest red cards; 7) fewest yellow cards; 8) drawing of lots.

==== Results by round ====
Round	1	2	3	4	5	6	7	8	9	10	11	12	13	14	15	16	17	18	19	20	21	22	23	24	25	26	27	28	29	30	31	32	33	34	35	36	37	38
Ground	A	H	A	H	A	H	H	A	H	A	H	H	A	H	A	A	H	H	A	H	A	H	A	H	A	A	H	A	H	A	A	H	A	H	H	A	A	H
Result	D	D	W	D	D	W	W	W	L	W	W	D	D	D	L	L	D	D	D	D	W	W	L	W	L	L	W	L	W	L	W	W	D	L	W	D	L	W
Position	12	11	9	11	13	7	3	2	3	3	1	3	3	3	8	8	8	9	9	10	10	6	8	6	8	9	9	9	9	9	9	8	8	8	7	8	9	9
Points	1	2	5	6	7	10	13	16	16	19	22	23	24	25	25	25	26	27	28	29	32	35	35	38	38	38	41	41	44	44	47	50	51	51	54	55	55	58

A = Away; H = Home; W = Win; D = Draw; L = Loss

==== Matches ====
21 March 2026 1	Cuiabá	0–0	Sport	Cuiabá
20:30 (UTC-3)		Report		Stadium: Arena Pantanal; Attendance: 3,211; Referee: Maguielson Lima Barbosa

1 April 2026 2	Sport	1–1	Vila Nova	Recife
19:00 (UTC-3)	Pedro Perotti 78'	Report	Janderson 58'	Stadium: Estádio Adelmar da Costa Carvalho (Ilha do Retiro); Attendance: 4,576; Referee: José Mendonça da Silva Júnior

4 April 2026 3	Londrina	1–2	Sport	Londrina
20:30 (UTC-3)	Bruno Santos 22'	Report	Chrystian Barletta 67' (pen.); Pedro Perotti 86'	Stadium: Estádio Vitorino Gonçalves Dias; Attendance: 4,620; Referee: Braulio da Silva Machado

11 April 2026 4	Sport	2–2	Avaí	Recife
18:00 (UTC-3)	Chrystian Barletta 45+9' (pen.); de Pena 88'	Report	Luiz Henrique 18' (pen.); Sorriso 90+5'	Stadium: Estádio Adelmar da Costa Carvalho (Ilha do Retiro); Attendance: 10,715; Referee: Lucas Paulo Torezin

18 April 2026 5	América Mineiro	0–0	Sport	Belo Horizonte
18:00 (UTC-3)		Report		Stadium: Estádio Raimundo Sampaio (Arena Independência); Attendance: 2,351; Referee: Gustavo Ervino Bauermann

25 April 2026 6	Sport	1–0	Novorizontino	Recife
20:30 (UTC-3)	Pedro Perotti 51'	Report		Stadium: Estádio Adelmar da Costa Carvalho (Ilha do Retiro); Attendance: 12,749; Referee: Lucas Guimarães Rechatiko Horn

3 May 2026 7	Sport	2–0	Ceará	Recife
18:00 (UTC-3)	Chrystian Barletta 52' (pen.); Madson 70'	Report		Stadium: Estádio Adelmar da Costa Carvalho (Ilha do Retiro); Attendance: 15,655; Referee: Bráulio da Silva Machado

9 May 2026 8	Ponte Preta	1–3	Sport	Campinas
18:30 (UTC-3)	Danilo Barcelos 22'	Report	Felipinho 30'; Chrystian Barletta 45+4' (pen.); Pedro Perotti 58'	Stadium: Estádio Moisés Lucarelli; Attendance: 4,803; Referee: Paulo Henrique Schleich Vollkopf

17 May 2026 9	Sport	1–2	CRB	Recife
20:30 (UTC-3)	Pedro Perotti 77'	Report	Mikael 39'; Danielzinho 58'	Stadium: Estádio Adelmar da Costa Carvalho (Ilha do Retiro); Attendance: 18,444; Referee: Edina Alves Batista

23 May 2026 10	Juventude	0–1	Sport	Caxias do Sul
20:30 (UTC-3)		Report	Iury Castilho 81'	Stadium: Estádio Alfredo Jaconi; Attendance: 3,328; Referee: Lucas Paulo Torezin

30 May 2026 11	Sport	2–0	Náutico	Recife
20:30 (UTC-3)	Chrystian Barletta 27' (pen.), 82'	Report		Stadium: Estádio Adelmar da Costa Carvalho (Ilha do Retiro); Attendance: 19,926; Referee: Bráulio da Silva Machado

10 June 2026 12	Sport	1–1	Athletic	Recife
21:00 (UTC-3)	Augusto Pucci 59'	Report	Ian Luccas 65'	Stadium: Estádio Adelmar da Costa Carvalho (Ilha do Retiro); Attendance: 13,724; Referee: Afro Rocha de Carvalho Filho

14 June 2026 13	São Bernardo	0–0	Sport	São Bernardo do Campo
11:00 (UTC-3)		Report		Stadium: Estádio 1º de Maio; Attendance: 2,298; Referee: André Luiz Skettino Policarpo Bento

18 June 2026 14	Sport	1–1	Atlético Goianiense	Recife
21:00 (UTC-3)	Pedro Perotti 25'	Report	Léo Jacó 90+5'	Stadium: Estádio Adelmar da Costa Carvalho (Ilha do Retiro); Attendance: 13,151; Referee: Rafael Rodrigo Klein

28 June 2026 15	Fortaleza	2–1	Sport	Fortaleza
18:30 (UTC-3)	Rodrigo Santos 27'; Welliton 90+4'	Report	Pedro Perotti 68'	Stadium: Estádio Governador Plácido Castelo (Castelão); Attendance: 8,339; Referee: Anderson Daronco

4 July 2026 16	Criciúma	1–0	Sport	Criciúma
16:00 (UTC-3)	Waguininho 28'	Report		Stadium: Estádio Heriberto Hülse; Attendance: 11,047; Referee: Bruno Pereira Vasconcelos

10 July 2026 17	Sport	3–3	Botafogo–SP	Recife
20:00 (UTC-3)	Chrystian Barletta 46', 90+5' (pen.); Marcelo Benevenuto 64'	Report	Zé Hugo 24'; Rafael Gava 41' (pen.); Patrick Brey 75'	Stadium: Estádio Adelmar da Costa Carvalho (Ilha do Retiro); Attendance: 8,997; Referee: Maguielson Lima Barbosa

18 July 2026 18	Sport	2–2	Operário Ferroviário	Recife
16:00 (UTC-3)	Biel 17'; Fábio Matheus 47'	Report	Aylon 6'; Vinícius Diniz 85'	Stadium: Estádio Adelmar da Costa Carvalho (Ilha do Retiro); Attendance: 12,893; Referee: Daiane Muniz

22 July 2026 19	Goiás	1–1	Sport	Goiânia
20:30 (UTC-3)	Djalma Silva 87'	Report	Pedro Perotti 21'	Stadium: Estádio Hailé Pinheiro (Serrinha); Attendance: 10,575; Referee: Ramon Abatti Abel

27 July 2026 20	Sport	1–1	Cuiabá	Recife
19:30 (UTC-3)	Pedro Perotti 52'	Report	Fábio Gomes 74'	Stadium: Estádio Adelmar da Costa Carvalho (Ilha do Retiro); Attendance: 13,446; Referee: Lucas Canetto Bellote

8 August 2026 21	Vila Nova	0–1	Sport	Goiânia
16:00 (UTC-3)		Report	Chrystian Barletta 6'	Stadium: Estádio Onésio Brasileiro Alvarenga; Attendance: 10,000; Referee: Afro Rocha De Carvalho Filho

14 August 2026 22	Sport	2–1	Londrina	Recife
20:30 (UTC-3)	Hernández 10', 42'	Report	João Vitor 29'	Stadium: Estádio Adelmar da Costa Carvalho (Ilha do Retiro); Attendance: 18,945; Referee: Flávio Rodrigues de Souza

19 August 2026 23	Avaí	2–1	Sport	Florianópolis
19:30 (UTC-3)	Del Piage 72'; Léo Gamalho 90'	Report	Hernández 64'	Stadium: Estádio Aderbal Ramos da Silva (Ressacada); Attendance: 6,151; Referee: João Vitor Gobi

24 August 2026 24	Sport	3–0	América Mineiro	Recife
19:30 (UTC-3)	Claudinho 12'; Clayson 45+1'; Pedro Perotti 90+6' (pen.)	Report		Stadium: Estádio Adelmar da Costa Carvalho (Ilha do Retiro); Attendance: 13,188; Referee: Dênis da Silva Ribeiro Serafim

28 August 2026 25	Novorizontino	2–1	Sport	Novo Horizonte
20:30 (UTC-3)	Rômulo 41'; Matheus Bianqui 76'	Report	Pedro Perotti 90'	Stadium: Estádio Doutor Jorge Ismael de Biasi; Attendance: 2,237; Referee: Maguielson Lima Barbosa

5 September 2026 26	Ceará	2–1	Sport	Fortaleza
18:30 (UTC-3)	Luizão 72'; Melk 88'	Report	Marlon 90+5'	Stadium: Estádio Governador Plácido Castelo (Castelão); Attendance: 9,152; Referee: Flavio Rodrigues de Souza

10 September 2026 27	Sport	2–0	Ponte Preta	Recife
21:30 (UTC-3)	Diego Leão 25' (o.g.); Chrystian Barletta 80' (pen.)	Report		Stadium: Estádio Adelmar da Costa Carvalho (Ilha do Retiro); Attendance: 14,827; Referee: Raimundo Rodrigues De Oliveira Junior

15 September 2026 28	CRB	2–1	Sport	Maceió
21:00 (UTC-3)	Crystopher 18'; Hereda 88'	Report	Patrick de Paula 90+1'	Stadium: Estádio Rei Pelé; Attendance: 14,930; Referee: Davi De Oliveira Lacerda

19 September 2026 29	Sport	2–1	Juventude	Recife
16:30 (UTC-3)	Chrystian Barletta 45+1'; Marcelo Ajul 86'	Report	Mandaca 32' (pen.)	Stadium: Estádio Adelmar da Costa Carvalho (Ilha do Retiro); Attendance: 15,461; Referee: Paulo Henrique Schleich Vollkopf

26 September 2026 30	Náutico	3–1	Sport	Recife
16:30 (UTC-3)	Vinícius 45+1'; Jean Carlos 47'; Gustavo Henrique 72'	Report	Neto Pessoa 90+1'	Stadium: Estádio Eládio de Barros Carvalho (Aflitos); Attendance: 10,056; Referee: Daiane Muniz

1 October 2026 31	Athletic	1–2	Sport	São João del-Rei
20:30 (UTC-3)	Kauan 24'	Report	Neto Pessoa 14'; de Pena 33'	Stadium: Estádio Joaquim Portugal (Arena Sicredi); Attendance: 2,837; Referee: Joao Vitor Gobi

6 October 2026 32	Sport	2–1	São Bernardo	Recife
19:30 (UTC-3)	Neto Pessoa 16'; Patrick de Paula 85'	Report	Pedrinho 45'	Stadium: Estádio Adelmar da Costa Carvalho (Ilha do Retiro); Attendance: 18,258; Referee: Raimundo Rodrigues de Oliveira Júnior

11 October 2026 33	Atlético Goianiense	1–1	Sport	Goiânia
16:10 (UTC-3)	Geovany Soares 45+3'	Report	Pedro Perotti 82'	Stadium: Estádio Antônio Accioly; Attendance: 5,076; Referee: Wagner do Nascimento Magalhães

16 October 2026 34	Sport	0–2	Fortaleza	Recife
20:30 (UTC-3)		Report	Cardona 45+2'; Rodriguinho 68'	Stadium: Estádio Adelmar da Costa Carvalho (Ilha do Retiro); Attendance: 21,379; Referee: André Luiz Skettino Policarpo Bento

23 October 2026 35	Sport	2–1	Criciúma	Recife
21:00 (UTC-3)	Chrystian Barletta 75', 90+9' (pen.)	Report	Fellipe Mateus 90+1'	Stadium: Estádio Adelmar da Costa Carvalho (Ilha do Retiro); Attendance: 14,081; Referee: Felipe Fernandes de Lima

31 October 2026 36	Botafogo–SP	1–1	Sport	Ribeirão Preto
16:00 (UTC-3)	Hygor 38'	Report	Pedro Perotti 45'	Stadium: Estádio Santa Cruz; Attendance: 2,629; Referee: Rafael Rodrigo Klein

6 November 2026 37	Operário Ferroviário	3–2	Sport	Ponta Grossa
19:30 (UTC-3)	Claudinho 13' (o.g.); Moraes 45+4'; Leonardo Erig 52'	Report	de Pena 5'; Pedro Perotti 37'	Stadium: Estádio Germano Krüger; Attendance: 3,961; Referee: Savio Pereira Sampaio

14 November 2026 38	Sport	3–0	Goiás	Recife
16:30 (UTC-3)	Chrystian Barletta 21'; Pedro Perotti 40'; Biel 90+3'	Report		Stadium: Estádio Adelmar da Costa Carvalho (Ilha do Retiro); Attendance: 3,917; Referee: Anderson Daronco
