= Adriel (footballer, born 2006) =

Brazilian footballer

Personal information
- Full name: Adriel Gomes do Nascimento
- Date of birth: 12 July 2006 (age 20)
- Place of birth: Araçagi, Brazil
- Position: Defensive midfielder

Team information
- Current team: Sport Recife
- Number: 54

Youth career
- 2018–2020: VF4
- 2020–2025: Sport Recife

Senior career*
| Years | Team | Apps | (Gls) |
| 2025– | Sport Recife | 13 | (0) |
- * Club domestic league appearances and goals as of 16 November 2026

Adriel Gomes do Nascimento (born 12 July 2006), simply known as Adriel, is a Brazilian professional footballer who plays as a defensive midfielder for Sport Recife.

== Career ==
Born in Araçagi, Paraíba, Adriel began his career with local side VF4 in 2018, before joining the youth sides of Sport Recife in September 2020. On 4 September 2022, he signed his first professional contract with the club, agreeing to a deal until 2025.

Adriel made his first-team debut on 11 January 2025, starting in a 1–1 Campeonato Pernambucano away draw against Afogados, as the club fielded an under-20 squad. He was promoted to the main squad by head coach Daniel Paulista in July, and made his Série A debut on 5 November, coming on as a late substitute for Christian Rivera in a 2–0 home loss to Juventude.

== Career statistics ==
As of 12 July 2026

Appearances and goals by club, season and competition
| Club | Season | League | | | State League (Note: Includes Campeonato Pernambucano) | | Cup (Note: Includes Copa do Brasil) | | Other | | Total | |
| Club | Season | Division | Apps | Goals | Apps | Goals | Apps | Goals | Apps | Goals | Apps | Goals |
|---|---|---|---|---|---|---|---|---|---|---|---|---|
| Sport Recife | 2025 | Série A | 5 | 0 | 7 | 0 | — | | 0 | 0 | 12 | 0 |
| Sport Recife | 2026 | Série B | 0 | 0 | 0 | 0 | 0 | 0 | 1 (Note: Includes Copa do Nordeste) | 0 | 1 | 0 |
| Career total | | | 5 | 0 | 7 | 0 | 0 | 0 | 1 | 0 | 13 | 0 |
