= Zé Lucas (footballer, born 2008) =

Brazilian footballer

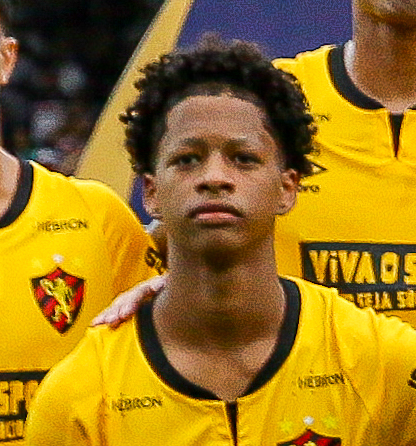
- Zé Lucas in 2025

Personal information
- Full name: José Lucas Gomes da Silva
- Date of birth: 23 March 2008 (age 18)
- Place of birth: Vitória de Santo Antão, Brazil
- Height: 1.74 m (5 ft 9 in)
- Position: Defensive midfielder

Team information
- Current team: Cruzeiro
- Number: 5

Youth career
- 2016–2025: Sport Recife

Senior career*
Years	Team	Apps	(Gls)
2025–2026	Sport Recife	46	(0)
2026–	Cruzeiro	0	(0)

International career
2025–	Brazil U17	6	(1)
- * Club domestic league appearances and goals as of 16 April 2026

José Lucas Gomes da Silva (born 23 March 2008), known as Zé Lucas, is a Brazilian professional footballer who plays as a defensive midfielder for Cruzeiro.

== Club career ==
=== Sport Recife ===
Zé Lucas was born in Vitória de Santo Antão, Pernambuco, and joined Sport Recife's youth sides at the age of eight, initially joining the futsal team. He made his first team debut at the age of 16 on 11 January 2025, starting in a 1–1 Campeonato Pernambucano away draw against Afogados, as the club fielded an under-20 squad.

After impressing in the first three matches of the year, Zé Lucas was definitely promoted to the main squad, and renewed his contract until 2028 on 6 February 2025.

=== Cruzeiro ===
On 25 July 2026, Cruzeiro announced the signing of Zé Lucas on a contract until 2031, for a rumoured fee of R$ 25.5 million.

== International career ==
On 10 February 2025, Zé Lucas was called up to the Brazil national under-17 team for two friendlies against Ecuador.

== Career statistics ==
As of 27 July 2026

Appearances and goals by club, season and competition
Club	Season	League			State League (Note: Includes Campeonato Pernambucano)		Cup (Note: Includes Copa do Brasil)		Continental		Other		Total	
Club	Season	Division	Apps	Goals	Apps	Goals	Apps	Goals	Apps	Goals	Apps	Goals	Apps	Goals
Sport Recife	2025	Série A	24	0	6	0	0	0	—		4 (Note: Appearance(s) in Copa do Nordeste)	0	34	0
Sport Recife	2026	Série B	14	0	2	0	3	0	—		4	0	23	0
Sport Recife	Total		38	0	8	0	3	0	—		8	0	57	0
Cruzeiro	2026	Série A	0	0	—		—		0	0	—		0	0
Career total			38	0	8	0	3	0	0	0	8	0	57	0

== Honours ==
Brazil U17

- South American U-17 Championship: 2025
