= Victor Hugo (footballer, born 2008) =

Brazilian footballer

Personal information
- Full name: Victor Hugo Viana da Silva
- Date of birth: 12 December 2008 (age 17)
- Place of birth: Cachoeiro do Itapemirim, Brazil
- Position: Left-back

Team information
- Current team: Sport Recife
- Number: 55

Youth career
- Grêmio Santo Agostinho
- 2023–: Boston City Brasil
- 2025–: → Sport Recife (loan)

Senior career*
Years	Team	Apps	(Gls)
2025–	Boston City Brasil	0	(0)
2025–	→ Sport Recife (loan)	1	(0)
- * Club domestic league appearances and goals as of 14:11, 17 September 2025 (UTC)

Victor Hugo Viana da Silva (born 12 December 2008), known as Victor Hugo, is a Brazilian professional footballer who plays as a left-back for Sport Recife.

== Career ==
Born in Cachoeiro do Itapemirim, Espírito Santo, Victor Hugo played for hometown side Grêmio Santo Agostinho before joining Boston City Brasil in 2023. In February 2025, he moved to Sport Recife on loan for one year, being initially assigned to the under-17 team.

Victor Hugo made his professional – and Série A – debut on 14 September 2025, starting in a 1–1 away draw against Red Bull Bragantino.

== Career statistics ==
As of 17 September 2025

Appearances and goals by club, season and competition
Club	Season	League			State League (Note: Includes Campeonato Pernambucano)		Cup (Note: Includes Copa do Brasil)		Other		Total	
Club	Season	Division	Apps	Goals	Apps	Goals	Apps	Goals	Apps	Goals	Apps	Goals
Sport Recife	2025	Série A	1	0	—		—		—		1	0
Career total			1	0	0	0	0	0	0	0	1	0
