= Claudinho (footballer, born September 2000) =

Brazilian footballer

Personal information
- Full name: Claudio Coelho Salvático
- Date of birth: 24 September 2000 (age 26)
- Place of birth: Nova Veneza, Brazil
- Height: 1.80 m (5 ft 11 in)
- Position: Right-back

Team information
- Current team: Sport Recife (on loan from Vitória)
- Number: 27

Youth career
- 2015–2021: Criciúma
- 2020–2021: → Atlético Mineiro (loan)

Senior career*
Years	Team	Apps	(Gls)
2021–2024	Criciúma	135	(10)
2025–	Vitória	25	(2)
2026–	→ Sport Recife (loan)	15	(1)
- * Club domestic league appearances and goals as of 16 November 2026

Claudio Coelho Salvático (born 24 September 2000), commonly known as Claudinho, is a Brazilian footballer who plays as a right back for Sport Recife, on loan from Vitória.

== Career ==
=== Criciúma ===
Born in Nova Veneza, Santa Catarina, Claudinho joined Criciúma's youth setup at the age of 14, after previously playing futsal. In February 2020, after impressing with the under-20 side in the Copa São Paulo de Futebol Júnior, he was loaned to Atlético Mineiro.

After having his loan terminated in March 2021, Criciúma announced the return of Claudinho to the club on 1 April, being definitely assigned to the first team. He made his senior debut three days later, starting in a 1–1 Campeonato Catarinense away draw against Marcílio Dias.

Claudinho became a regular starter during the 2021 Série C, and scored his first senior goal on 10 October, netting the opener in a 2–0 away win over Ituano. On 21 December, after helping the club to achieve promotion, he renewed his contract until 2023.

After featuring more sparingly during the 2022 season, Claudinho was a regular starter during the 2023 campaign, renewing his contract until 2024 on 23 June 2023. On 29 January 2024, after achieving promotion to the top tier, he further extended his link until the end of 2025.

Claudinho made his top tier debut on 13 April 2024, starting in a 1–1 home draw against Juventude. He scored his first goal in the division on 30 June, netting the equalizer in a home draw against Internacional for the same scoreline, and finished the year as a first-choice as the club suffered immediate relegation.

=== Vitória ===
On 4 January 2025, Vitória announced the signing of Claudinho on a three-year deal, for a rumoured fee of R$ 5.1 million for 60% of his economic rights. Mainly a backup to Raúl Cáceres, he struggled with injuries and was loaned to Sport Recife in the second division in July 2026.

== Career statistics ==
As of 1 November 2026

Club	Season	League			State League		Cup		Continental		Other		Total	
Club	Season	Division	Apps	Goals	Apps	Goals	Apps	Goals	Apps	Goals	Apps	Goals	Apps	Goals
Criciúma	2021	Série C	14	1	4	0	4	0	—		1 (Note: Appearance(s) in Copa Santa Catarina)	0	23	1
Criciúma	2022	Série B	20	1	3	0	2	0	—		—		25	1
Criciúma	2023	Série B	32	3	15	0	2	1	—		—		49	4
Criciúma	2024	Série A	34	2	16	3	4	0	—		1 (Note: Appearance(s) in Recopa Catarinense)	0	55	5
Criciúma	Total		100	9	38	3	12	1	—		2	0	152	13
Vitória	2025	Série A	15	0	8	2	0	0	4 (Note: Appearance(s) in Copa Sudamericana)	1	4 (Note: Appearance(s) in Copa do Nordeste)	0	31	3
Vitória	2026	Série A	2	0	0	0	0	0	—		0	0	2	0
Vitória	Total		17	0	8	2	0	0	4	1	4	0	33	3
Sport Recife (loan)	2026	Série B	13	1	—		—		—		—		13	1
Career total			130	10	46	5	12	1	4	1	6	0	198	17

== Honours ==
Criciúma

- Campeonato Catarinense Série B: 2022
- Campeonato Catarinense: 2023, 2024
- Recopa Catarinense: 2024
