= Habraão =

Brazilian footballer (born 2001)

- Habraão in 2023

Personal information
- Full name: Habraão Lincon do Nascimento Saraiva
- Date of birth: 26 June 2001 (age 25)
- Place of birth: Além Paraíba, Brazil
- Height: 1.84 m (6 ft 0 in)
- Position: Centre back

Team information
- Current team: Sport Recife (on loan from Athletico Paranaense)
- Number: 28

Youth career
- 2019–2022: Primavera
- 2019: → Flamengo (loan)
- 2020–2021: → Coritiba (loan)
- 2021–2022: → Fortaleza (loan)

Senior career*
Years	Team	Apps	(Gls)
2022–2025	Fortaleza	8	(1)
2023	→ ABC (loan)	24	(0)
2024	→ Chapecoense (loan)	18	(3)
2024–2025	→ Santa Clara (loan)	1	(0)
2025–	Athletico Paranaense	18	(0)
2026–	→ Sport Recife (loan)	12	(0)
- * Club domestic league appearances and goals as of 16 November 2026

Habraão Lincon do Nascimento Saraiva (born 26 June 2001), simply known as Habraão, is a Brazilian professional footballer who plays as a central defender for Sport Recife, on loan from Athletico Paranaense.

== Club career ==
Born in Além Paraíba, Minas Gerais, Habraão joined Flamengo's youth setup in March 2019, on loan from Primavera. Released nearly one year later, he moved to Coritiba also in a temporary deal, but was also released in February 2021.

On 13 March 2021, still owned by Primavera, Habraão signed for Fortaleza and was initially assigned to the under-20s. He was promoted to the first team in January 2022, and signed a permanent three-year contract on 10 February, as the club paid R$ 200,000 for 50% of his economic rights.

Habraão made his senior debut with the Leão do Pici on 22 June 2022, coming on as a late substitute for Moisés in a 2–0 home win over rivals Ceará, for the year's Copa do Brasil. On his Série A debut on 3 July, he scored the equalizer in a 2–1 away loss against Coritiba.

== Career statistics ==
As of match played 8 February 2025

Club	Season	League			State League		Cup		Continental		Other		Total	
Club	Season	Division	Apps	Goals	Apps	Goals	Apps	Goals	Apps	Goals	Apps	Goals	Apps	Goals
Fortaleza	2022	Série A	5	1	0	0	2	0	0	0	0	0	7	1
Fortaleza	2023	Série A	0	0	1	0	0	0	0	0	0	0	1	0
Fortaleza	Total		5	1	1	0	2	0	0	0	0	0	8	1
ABC (loan)	2023	Série B	22	0	2	0	1	0	—		—		25	0
Chapecoense (loan)	2024	Série B	11	1	7	2	0	0	—		—		18	3
Santa Clara (loan)	2024–25	Primeira Liga	1	0	—		1	0	—		0	0	2	0
Athletico Paranaense	2025	Série B	14	0	—		3	0	—		4 (Note: Appearance(s) in Taça FPF)	0	21	0
Athletico Paranaense	2026	Série A	0	0	4	0	0	0	—		—		4	0
Athletico Paranaense	Total		14	0	4	0	3	0	—		4	0	25	0
Sport Recife (loan)	2026	Série B	11	0	—		—		—		4 (Note: Appearance(s) in Copa do Nordeste)	1	15	1
Career total			64	2	14	2	7	0	0	0	8	1	93	5

== Honours ==
Fortaleza

- Copa do Nordeste: 2022
- Campeonato Cearense: 2022, 2023
