= Micael (footballer, born 2006) =

Brazilian footballer

Personal information
- Full name: Micael de Barros Viturino
- Date of birth: 10 February 2006 (age 20)
- Place of birth: Pesqueira, Brazil
- Height: 1.85 m (6 ft 1 in)
- Position: Forward

Team information
- Current team: São José-SP (on loan from Sport Recife)
- Number: 33

Youth career
- 2018–2026: Sport Recife

Senior career*
Years	Team	Apps	(Gls)
2025–	Sport Recife	10	(2)
2026–	→ São José-SP (loan)	0	(0)
- * Club domestic league appearances and goals as of 19:26, 8 July 2026 (UTC)

Micael de Barros Viturino (born 10 February 2006), simply known as Micael, is a Brazilian professional footballer who plays as a forward for São José-SP.

== Career ==
Born in Pesqueira, Pernambuco, Micael joined Sport Recife's youth sides at the age of 12. He made his first team debut on 11 January 2025, starting in a 1–1 Campeonato Pernambucano away draw against Afogados, as the club fielded an under-20 squad.

Back to the under-20 squad after two further appearances, Micael only returned to the first team for the 2026 state league, and scored his first goal on 14 January of that year, in a 2–0 home win over Retrô. Late in the month, he scored the winner in a 2–1 success over rivals Santa Cruz.

On 2 April 2026, Micael renewed his contract with Sport until the end of 2027. On 6 July, the club announced his loan to São José-SP until October.

On 20 July 2026, before the match between São Caetano and São José-SP for the first round of Copa Paulista, Micael was sent off by the referee Gustavo Holanda Souza because, according to the referee, he urinated next to the reserve bench. He was replaced by Tchê Tchê, who scored a goal in the match. The game ended in a 2–1 victory for São José-SP.

== Career statistics ==
As of 8 July 2026

Club	Season	League			State League		Cup		Continental		Other		Total	
Club	Season	Division	Apps	Goals	Apps	Goals	Apps	Goals	Apps	Goals	Apps	Goals	Apps	Goals
Sport Recife	2025	Série B	0	0	3	0	0	0	—		0	0	3	0
Sport Recife	2026	Série B	1	0	6	2	1	0	—		1 (Note: Appearance(s) in Copa do Nordeste)	0	9	2
Sport Recife	Total		1	0	9	2	1	0	—		1	0	12	2
São José-SP (loan)	2026	Paulista A2	—		—		—		—		0	0	0	0
Career total			1	0	9	2	1	0	0	0	1	0	12	2
