= Tchê Tchê (footballer, born 1997) =

Brazilian footballer

Personal information
- Full name: Jefferson da Silva Alves
- Date of birth: 27 November 1997 (age 28)
- Place of birth: Rio de Janeiro, Brazil
- Height: 1.80 m (5 ft 11 in)
- Position: Winger

Senior career*
| Years | Team | Apps | (Gls) |
| 2018 | Juventus-RJ | 6 | (1) |
| 2019 | EC Resende | 7 | (7) |
| 2020 | Campinense | 0 | (0) |
| 2020 | Olaria | 6 | (1) |
| 2022–2025 | Grün-Weiß Lübben | 59 | (29) |
| 2025 | Coxim | 8 | (2) |
| 2025–2026 | Uberlândia | 9 | (2) |
| 2026 | São José-SP | 0 | (0) |
- * Club domestic league appearances and goals as of 17:58, 2 July 2026 (UTC)

Jefferson da Silva Alves (born 27 November 1997), known as Tchê Tchê, is a Brazilian professional footballer who plays as a left winger.

== Career ==
Nicknamed after Tchê Tchê due to his physical resemblance, he began his career with local side Juventus-RJ in 2018. In November of the following year, after a period at EC Resende, he was announced in the squad of Campinense for the 2020 season.

After failing to make an appearance for Campinense, Tchê Tchê moved to Olaria in September 2020. In 2022, he moved abroad and joined Brandenburg-Liga side SV Grün-Weiß Lübben.

Tchê Tchê returned to his home country in January 2025, after signing for Coxim. In April, he was announced in the squad of Uberlândia for the Série D.

In October 2025, Tchê Tchê renewed with UEC for the following season, but did not make an appearance for the side in the season. On 2 July 2026, he was announced at São José-SP for the Copa Paulista.

== Career statistics ==
As of 20 October 2026

| Club | Season | League | | | State League | | Cup | | Continental | | Other | | Total | |
| Club | Season | Division | Apps | Goals | Apps | Goals | Apps | Goals | Apps | Goals | Apps | Goals | Apps | Goals |
|---|---|---|---|---|---|---|---|---|---|---|---|---|---|---|
| Juventus-RJ | 2018 | Carioca Série B2 | — | | 6 | 1 | — | | — | | — | | 6 | 1 |
| EC Resende | 2019 | Carioca Série C | — | | 7 | 7 | — | | — | | — | | 7 | 7 |
| Campinense | 2020 | Série D | — | | 0 | 0 | — | | — | | — | | 0 | 0 |
| Olaria | 2020 | Carioca Série B1 | — | | 6 | 1 | — | | — | | — | | 6 | 1 |
| Grün-Weiß Lübben | 2022–23 | Brandenburg-Liga | 13 | 4 | — | | — | | — | | 1 (Note: Appearance(s) in Brandenburg Cup) | 2 | 14 | 6 |
| Grün-Weiß Lübben | 2023–24 | Brandenburg-Liga | 32 | 16 | — | | — | | — | | 2 | 0 | 34 | 16 |
| Grün-Weiß Lübben | 2024–25 | Brandenburg-Liga | 14 | 9 | — | | — | | — | | 2 | 3 | 16 | 12 |
| Grün-Weiß Lübben | Total | | 59 | 29 | — | | — | | — | | 5 | 5 | 64 | 34 |
| Coxim | 2025 | Sul-Mato-Grossense | — | | 8 | 2 | — | | — | | — | | 8 | 2 |
| Uberlândia | 2025 | Série D | 9 | 2 | — | | — | | — | | — | | 9 | 2 |
| Uberlândia | 2026 | Série D | — | | 0 | 0 | — | | — | | — | | 0 | 0 |
| Uberlândia | Total | | 9 | 2 | 0 | 0 | — | | — | | — | | 9 | 2 |
| São José-SP | 2026 | Paulista A2 | — | | — | | — | | — | | 10 (Note: Appearance(s) in Copa Paulista) | 1 | 10 | 1 |
| Career total | | | 68 | 31 | 27 | 11 | 0 | 0 | 0 | 0 | 15 | 6 | 110 | 48 |

== Honours ==
São José-SP

- Copa Paulista: 2026
