= Guilherme dos Anjos =

Brazilian football coach

Personal information
- Full name: Guilherme Macedo dos Anjos
- Date of birth: 12 July 1989 (age 37)
- Place of birth: Brazil

Managerial career
- Years: Team
- 2012: Atlético Goianiense (assistant)
- 2012: Figueirense (assistant)
- 2013: Fortaleza (assistant)
- 2014: Atlético Goianiense (assistant)
- 2015: Caxias (assistant)
- 2015: Goiás (assistant)
- 2015: ABC (assistant)
- 2016: Najran (assistant)
- 2016: Al-Faisaly (assistant)
- 2016–2017: Al-Qadisiyah (assistant)
- 2017–2018: Goiás (assistant)
- 2019–2020: Paysandu (assistant)
- 2020–2021: Náutico (assistant)
- 2021–2022: Náutico (assistant)
- 2022–2023: Ponte Preta (assistant)
- 2023–2024: Paysandu (assistant)
- 2024: CRB (assistant)
- 2025: Náutico (assistant)
- 2026: Náutico

Guilherme Macedo dos Anjos (born 12 July 1989) is a Brazilian professional football coach.

== Career ==
The son of Hélio dos Anjos, he often trained in the youth categories of the clubs his father coached, but retired at the age of 18 and moved to São Paulo to study. He began working as a physio, before starting to work as an assistant of his father in 2012, at Atlético Goianiense.

Guilherme dos Anjos continued to work as his assistant at Figueirense, Fortaleza, Atlético Goianiense, Caxias, Goiás (two stints), ABC, Najran, Al-Faisaly, Al-Qadisiyah, Paysandu (two stints), Náutico (three stints), Ponte Preta and CRB. In the 2025, at Náutico, Hélio and Guilherme often participated in press conferences together, with Guilherme still being the assistant, in the model of Ramón and Emiliano Díaz's partnership.

On 10 November 2025, after achieving promotion with Timbu to the Série B, Hélio and Guilherme dos Anjos renewed their contract with the club until 2027, now with both being head coaches of the side in a shared command. Both were sacked on 23 September 2026, despite winning three of the last six matches.
