= Biel (footballer, born 2002) =

Brazilian footballer (born 2002)

Personal information
- Full name: Luiz Gabriel de Oliveira Fonseca
- Date of birth: 19 March 2002 (age 24)
- Place of birth: Curitiba, Brazil
- Height: 1.82 m (6 ft 0 in)
- Position: Attacking midfielder

Team information
- Current team: Sport Recife (on loan from Brusque)
- Number: 6

Youth career
- Coritiba

Senior career*
Years	Team	Apps	(Gls)
2020–2024	Coritiba	17	(0)
2023	→ Novorizontino (loan)	13	(0)
2024	→ Paysandu (loan)	15	(4)
2025–	Brusque	40	(4)
2026–	→ Sport Recife (loan)	31	(2)
- * Club domestic league appearances and goals as of 17 November 2026

Luiz Gabriel de Oliveira Fonseca (born 19 March 2002), commonly known as Biel, is a Brazilian professional footballer who plays as an attacking midfielder for Sport Recife, on loan from Brusque.

== Career statistics ==
As of match played 26 October 2024

Appearances and goals by club, season and competition
Club	Season	League			State league		Copa do Brasil		Other		Total	
Club	Season	Division	Apps	Goals	Apps	Goals	Apps	Goals	Apps	Goals	Apps	Goals
Coritiba	2020	Série A	1	0	0	0	0	0	—		1	0
Coritiba	2021	Série B	4	0	0	0	0	0	—		4	0
Coritiba	2022	Série A	5	0	6 (Note: Appearance(s) in Campeonato Paranaense)	0	0	0	—		11	0
Coritiba	2023	Série A	0	0	1	0	0	0	—		1	0
Coritiba	Total		10	0	7	0	0	0	—		17	0
Novorizontino (loan)	2023	Série B	13	0	0	0	0	0	—		13	0
Paysandu (loan)	2024	Série B	3	0	0	0	2	0	4 (Note: Appearance(s) in Copa Verde)	1	9	1
Career total			26	0	7	0	2	0	4	1	39	1

== Honours ==
Paysandu

- Campeonato Paraense: 2024
- Copa Verde: 2024
