= Diego Hernández (Uruguayan footballer) =

Uruguayan footballer (born 2000)

Personal information
- Full name: Diego Manuel Hernández González
- Date of birth: 22 June 2000 (age 26)
- Place of birth: Montevideo, Uruguay
- Height: 1.75 m (5 ft 9 in)
- Positions: Attacking midfielder; winger

Team information
- Current team: Sport Recife (on loan from Botafogo)
- Number: 20

Youth career
- Peñarol
- Montevideo Wanderers

Senior career*
Years	Team	Apps	(Gls)
2020–2023	Montevideo Wanderers	83	(13)
2023–	Botafogo	17	(1)
2024	→ León (loan)	13	(2)
2025	→ Everton (loan)	13	(1)
2025–2026	→ Remo (loan)	21	(4)
2026–	→ Sport Recife (loan)	19	(3)

International career
2023	Uruguay U23	3	(0)
- * Club domestic league appearances and goals as of 16 November 2026

Diego Manuel Hernández González (born 22 June 2000) is a Uruguayan professional footballer who plays as an attacking midfielder or left winger for Sport Recife on loan from Botafogo.

== Club career ==
Hernández is a former youth academy player of Peñarol. After being released by the club in December 2018, he moved to Montevideo Wanderers. He made his professional debut for Wanderers on 12 September 2020 in a 2–1 league defeat against Plaza Colonia.

In 2023, Hernández signed a 3-year-deal with Botafogo. In a survey carried out in 2024, Diego Hernández, signed for US$2.5 million, appeared among Botafogo's most expensive signings, in fourth place.

In July 2024, he was loaned out to Mexican club León. In January 2025, he switched to Chilean club Everton de Viña del Mar.

In July 2025, on loan from Botafogo, he was announced as a new reinforcement for Clube do Remo to compete in Series B of the Brazilian Championship.

== International career ==
On 20 March 2023, Hernández received his first call-up to the Uruguay national team as a replacement for the injured Giorgian de Arrascaeta. On 28 September 2023, he was named in Uruguay's squad for the 2023 Pan American Games.
