= Yago Felipe =

Brazilian footballer

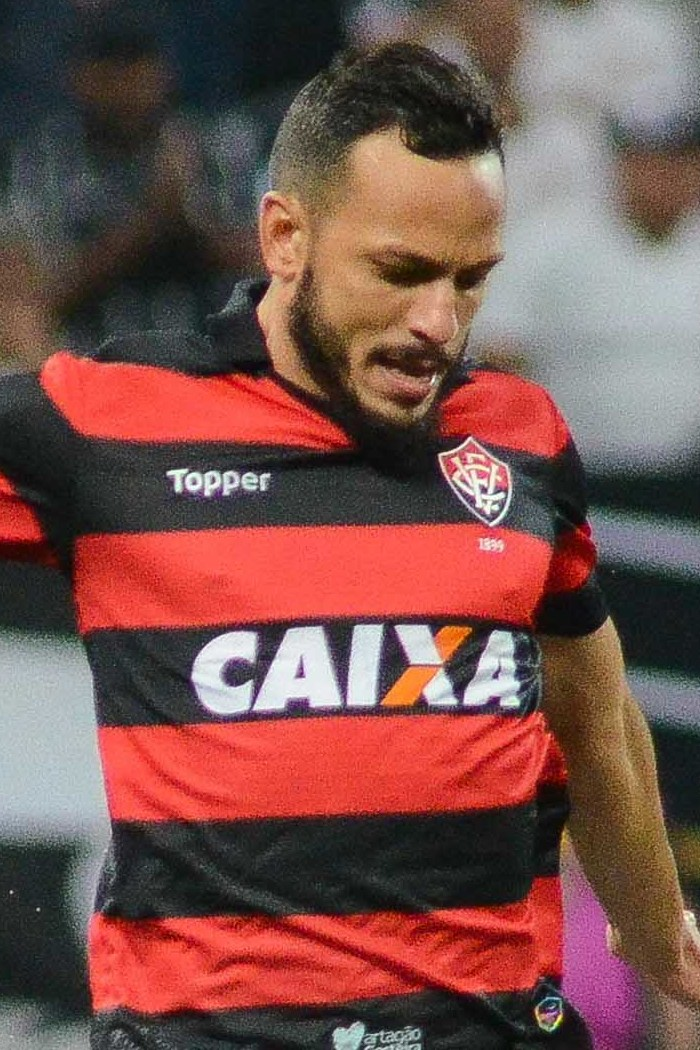

Personal information
- Full name: Yago Felipe da Costa Rocha
- Date of birth: 3 February 1995 (age 31)
- Place of birth: Limoeiro do Norte, Brazil
- Height: 1.72 m (5 ft 7 1/2 in)
- Position: Midfielder

Team information
- Current team: Chapecoense
- Number: 88

Youth career
- 2008–2011: Flamengo
- 2011: Botafogo
- 2011–2014: Figueirense

Senior career*
| Years | Team | Apps | (Gls) |
| 2014–2017 | Figueirense | 76 | (2) |
| 2017–2019 | Vitória | 68 | (9) |
| 2019 | → Goiás (loan) | 30 | (2) |
| 2020–2023 | Fluminense | 125 | (8) |
| 2023–2025 | Bahia | 45 | (2) |
| 2025 | → Mirassol (loan) | 19 | (0) |
| 2026 | Sport Recife | 23 | (1) |
| 2026– | Chapecoense | 1 | (0) |
- * Club domestic league appearances and goals as of 16 August 2026

Yago Felipe da Costa Rocha (born 13 February 1995), known as Yago Felipe, is a Brazilian footballer who plays as a midfielder for Chapecoense.

== Club career ==
Born in Limoeiro do Norte, Ceará, Yago joined Figueirense's youth setup in 2011, after spells with Flamengo and Botafogo. He also had a trial period at RCD Espanyol, but nothing came of it.

On 9 November 2014 Yago made his Série A debut, coming on as a second-half substitute in a 1–0 home win against state rivals Chapecoense. He was made a starter by manager Argel Fucks in the following year.

In April 2019, he joined Goiás on loan until the end of 2019.

In 2023, Yago was sold from Fluminense to Bahia. In 2025, he was loaned to Mirassol.

== Honours ==
Figueirense

- Campeonato Catarinense: 2014, 2015

Fluminense

- Campeonato Carioca: 2022, 2023

Bahia

- Campeonato Baiano: 2025
