= Gustavo Maia =

Brazilian footballer (born 2001)

Personal information
- Full name: Gustavo Maia da Silva
- Date of birth: 22 January 2001 (age 25)
- Place of birth: Brasília, Brazil
- Height: 1.68 m (5 ft 6 in)
- Position: Winger

Team information
- Current team: Atlético Goianiense
- Number: 11

Youth career
- 2015–2020: São Paulo

Senior career*
Years	Team	Apps	(Gls)
2020–2023	Barcelona B	8	(0)
2021–2022	→ Internacional (loan)	12	(1)
2023	→ Valencia B (loan)	12	(1)
2023	Vila Nova	5	(0)
2024	Náutico	18	(6)
2025–2026	Sport Recife	21	(2)
2025	→ Criciúma (loan)	1	(0)
2026–	Atlético Goianiense	0	(0)

International career^{‡}
2017	Brazil U16		
2018	Brazil U17		
2020	Brazil U20	2	(2)
- * Club domestic league appearances and goals as of 16 April 2026 ‡ National team caps and goals as of 11 October 2021

Gustavo Maia da Silva (born 22 January 2001) is a Brazilian footballer who plays for Campeonato Brasileiro Série B club Atlético Goianiense.

== Club career ==
=== São Paulo ===
Born in Brasília, Brazil, Maia joined São Paulo's youth setup at age 14. He played a total of 103 matches for São Paulo as he progressed through the age groups and in 2018 with the Under-17 side, he notched 30 goals in 36 games. In March 2020, Maia was included in the first team squad for a Campeonato Paulista match against Botafogo. He was an unused substitute in a 1–0 away loss.

=== Barcelona ===
On 6 August 2020, La Liga club FC Barcelona announced the signing of Maia for a fee of €4.5 million with a buyout clause of €300 million, and he was assigned to the reserves in the third division. He made his debut for Barça B in the opening matchday fixture against Gimnàstic de Tarragona on 18 October. He replaced Matheus Pereira in a 1–0 home victory.

==== Loan to Internacional ====
On 30 August 2021, Maia joined Série A club Internacional on loan until 31 December 2022, following a disappointing season with Barcelona. Maia scored his first goal on 24 October, a last minute equalizer in a 2–2 draw against Corinthians.

==== Loan to Valencia Mestalla ====
On 31 January 2023, Maia joined Valencia Mestalla in the Segunda Federación. He made his debut the following 5 February in a 2–1 away win against Lleida Esportiu, and scored his first goal on 22 April in the 3–2 home victory against Ebro.
