= Pedro Perotti =

Brazilian footballer (born 1997)

Personal information
- Full name: Pedro Henrique Perotti
- Date of birth: 22 November 1997 (age 28)
- Place of birth: Seberi, Brazil
- Height: 1.86 m (6 ft 1 in)
- Position: Forward

Team information
- Current team: Sport Recife (on loan from Chapecoense)
- Number: 9

Youth career
- Chapecoense

Senior career*
Years	Team	Apps	(Gls)
2016–2025	Chapecoense	145	(39)
2019–2020	→ Nacional (loan)	11	(1)
2023	→ FC Tokyo (loan)	13	(1)
2025	Radomiak Radom	13	(1)
2025–	Chapecoense	28	(4)
2026–	→ Sport Recife (loan)	37	(15)
- * Club domestic league appearances and goals as of 16 November 2026

Pedro Henrique Perotti (born 22 November 1997), known as Pedro Perotti or simply Perotti, is a Brazilian professional footballer who plays as a forward for Série B club Sport Recife, on loan from Chapecoense.

== Career ==
Born 22 November 1997, in Seberi but raised in Rodeio Bonito, both in Rio Grande do Sul, Perotti was a Chapecoense youth graduate. He made his senior debut on 12 March 2016, coming on as a late substitute in a 4–0 Campeonato Catarinense home win against Camboriú.

Perotti did not board LaMia Airlines Flight 2933 for the 2016 Copa Sudamericana Finals, which crashed and killed 19 of his teammates. He made his Série A debut on 23 June 2017, replacing Luis Manuel Seijas in a 1–5 away loss against Flamengo.

Perotti scored his first senior goal on 2 March 2019, netting the winner in a 2–1 home success over Metropolitano. On 18 June, after failing to establish himself as a starter, Perotti was loaned to Portuguese Primeira Liga side C.D. Nacional for one year.

Perotti returned from loan in August 2020, with his parent club now in the Série B. He contributed with four goals in 21 appearances, as his side returned to the top tier as champions.

Perotti became a regular starter in the 2021 Catarinense, and scored 15 goals in the competition, which included a hat-trick in a 3–1 home win against Próspera. On 6 April, he renewed his contract until 2024.

On 3 January 2023, Perotti agreed to join to FC Tokyo on loan until January 2024, the end of J1 League season.

On 13 January 2025, Polish club Radomiak Radom announced the signing of Perotti on a one-year contract, with an option to extend for another two-and-a-half years.

On 10 June 2025, Perotti terminated his contract with Radomiak and returned to Chapecoense.

== Career statistics ==
As of match played 24 May 2025

Appearances and goals by club, season and competition
Club	Season	League			State league (Note: Includes Campeonato Catarinense)		National cup (Note: Includes Copa do Brasil, Taça de Portugal, Emperor's Cup)		League cup (Note: Includes Taça da Liga, J.League Cup)		Continental		Other		Total	
Club	Season	Division	Apps	Goals	Apps	Goals	Apps	Goals	Apps	Goals	Apps	Goals	Apps	Goals	Apps	Goals
Chapecoense	2016	Série A	0	0	2	0	0	0	—		—		—		2	0
Chapecoense	2017	Série A	2	0	0	0	0	0	—		0	0	1 (Note: Appearance in Primeira Liga)	0	3	0
Chapecoense	2018	Série A	0	0	4	0	0	0	—		1 (Note: Appearance in Copa Libertadores)	0	—		5	0
Chapecoense	2019	Série A	1	0	6	1	1	0	—		—		—		8	1
Chapecoense	2020	Série B	21	4	—		0	0	—		—		—		21	4
Chapecoense	2021	Série A	26	3	18	15	0	0	—		—		1 (Note: Appearance in Recopa Catarinense)	0	45	18
Chapecoense	2022	Série B	26	6	12	4	1	1	—		—		—		39	11
Chapecoense	2024	Série B	16	3	11	3	0	0	—		—		—		27	6
Chapecoense	Total		92	16	53	23	2	1	0	0	1	0	2	0	150	40
Nacional (loan)	2019–20	LigaPro	11	1	—		1	0	1	0	—		—		13	1
FC Tokyo (loan)	2023	J1 League	13	1	—		2	0	5	2	—		—		20	3
Radomiak Radom	2024–25	Ekstraklasa	13	1	—		—		—		—		—		13	1
Career total			129	19	53	23	5	1	6	2	1	0	2	0	196	45

== Honours ==
Chapecoense

- Campeonato Catarinense: 2016
- Campeonato Brasileiro Série B: 2020
