= Murilo Rhikman =

Brazilian footballer (born 2006)

Personal information
- Full name: Murilo Rhikman Alves Pimentel
- Date of birth: 13 March 2006 (age 20)
- Place of birth: Brasília, Brazil
- Height: 1.84 m (6 ft 0 in)
- Position: Midfielder

Team information
- Current team: Sport Recife (on loan from Cruzeiro)
- Number: 15

Youth career
- 2019–: Cruzeiro

Senior career*
Years	Team	Apps	(Gls)
2025–	Cruzeiro	5	(0)
2026–	→ Sport Recife (loan)	0	(0)
- * Club domestic league appearances and goals as of 9 April 2026

Murilo Rhikman Alves Pimentel (born 13 March 2006), known as Murilo Rhikman, is a Brazilian footballer who plays as a midfielder for Sport, on loan from Cruzeiro.

== Career ==
Born in Brasília, Federal District, Murilo Rhikman joined Cruzeiro's youth sides at the age of 13. He signed his first professional contract with the club in March 2023, agreeing to a three-year deal.

On 28 March 2025, Murilo Rhikman renewed his link with the club until 2028. He made his first team debut on 25 April, starting in a 2–1 away loss to Palestino, for the year's Copa Sudamericana.

== Career statistics ==
As of 28 May 2025

Club	Season	League			State League		Cup		Continental		Other		Total	
Club	Season	Division	Apps	Goals	Apps	Goals	Apps	Goals	Apps	Goals	Apps	Goals	Apps	Goals
Cruzeiro	2025	Série A	1	0	0	0	0	0	3 (Note: Appearance(s) in Copa Sudamericana)	0	—		4	0
Career total			1	0	0	0	0	0	3	0	0	0	4	0
