= Zé Gabriel =

Brazilian footballer

Personal information
- Full name: José Gabriel dos Santos Silva
- Date of birth: 21 January 1999 (age 27)
- Place of birth: Carmópolis, Brazil
- Height: 1.84 m (6 ft 0 in)
- Positions: Defensive midfielder; centre-back

Team information
- Current team: Sport Recife
- Number: 23

Youth career
- 2013–2017: Corinthians
- 2018–2019: Internacional

Senior career*
Years	Team	Apps	(Gls)
2019–2021	Internacional	50	(2)
2022–2025	Vasco da Gama	71	(2)
2024	→ Coritiba (loan)	17	(1)
2025	Criciúma	10	(0)
2025–2026	Portimonense	13	(0)
2026–	Sport Recife	36	(0)
- * Club domestic league appearances and goals as of 16 November 2026

José Gabriel dos Santos Silva (born 21 January 1999), known as Zé Gabriel, is a Brazilian professional footballer who plays as a defensive midfielder or centre-back for Campeonato Brasileiro Série B club Sport Recife.

== Professional career ==
Zé Gabriel played at the base of the Corinthians between 2013 and 2017, and moved to the base of the Internacional in 2018, becoming part of the senior squad in 2019. Zé Gabriel made his professional debut for Internacional on 3 August 2019, losing for 2–1 by Fluminense, at the Campeonato Brasileiro Série A.

On 10 February 2022, Zé Gabriel moved to Série B club Vasco da Gama. On 13 August 2024, as Vasco da Gama was competing in Série A, he was sent on loan to Série B side Coritiba. On 24 April 2025, Zé Gabriel signed a permanent deal with Série B club Criciúma.

On 13 August 2025, Zé Gabriel moved abroad for the first time in his career, joining Liga Portugal 2 club Portimonense on a one-year contract with an option for a further year. However, five months later he returned to Brazil, joining recently-relegated Série B club Sport Recife on a contract until 30 November 2026.

== Career statistics ==
As of match played 19 January 2025

Appearances and goals by club, season and competition
Club	Season	League			State league		Copa do Brasil		Continental		Total	
Club	Season	Division	Apps	Goals	Apps	Goals	Apps	Goals	Apps	Goals	Apps	Goals
Internacional	2019	Série A	2	0	0	0	0	0	0	0	2	0
Internacional	2020	Série A	22	0	8 (Note: Appearance(s) in Campeonato Gaúcho)	0	3	0	3 (Note: Appearance(s) in Copa Libertadores)	0	36	0
Internacional	2021	Série A	9	0	9	2	0	0	4	0	22	2
Internacional	Total		33	0	17	2	3	0	7	0	60	2
Vasco da Gama	2022	Série B	10	0	6 (Note: Appearance(s) in Campeonato Carioca)	0	2	0	—		18	0
Vasco da Gama	2023	Série A	27	1	2	0	0	0	—		29	1
Vasco da Gama	2024	Série A	14	0	10	1	3	0	—		27	1
Vasco da Gama	2025	Série A	0	0	2	0	0	0	0	0	2	0
Vasco da Gama	Total		51	1	20	1	5	0	0	0	76	2
Coritiba (loan)	2024	Série B	17	1	0	0	0	0	—		17	1
Career total			101	2	37	3	8	0	7	0	153	5
