= Marlon (footballer, born September 1997) =

Brazilian footballer (born 1997)

Personal information
- Full name: Marlon Douglas de Sales Silva
- Date of birth: September 15, 1997 (age 29)
- Place of birth: Toritama, Brazil
- Height: 1.76 m (5 ft 9 in)
- Position: Winger

Team information
- Current team: Sport Recife
- Number: 31

Youth career
- Porto PE

Senior career*
Years	Team	Apps	(Gls)
2014–2021	Porto PE	25	(3)
2017–2018	→ Flamengo Arcoverde (loan)	17	(3)
2018	→ Sport Recife (loan)	0	(0)
2019	→ Central (loan)	6	(2)
2020	→ Oeste (loan)	21	(0)
2020–2021	→ Paysandu (loan)	30	(6)
2021–2023	Paysandu	23	(10)
2023–2024	Gil Vicente	23	(0)
2024	→ Guarani (loan)	0	(0)
2025	Paysandu	35	(6)
2026–	Sport Recife	31	(1)
- * Club domestic league appearances and goals as of 16 November 2026

Marlon Douglas de Sales Silva (born 15 September 1997), known simply as Marlon, is a Brazilian professional footballer who plays as a winger for Série B club Sport Recife.

== Professional career ==
Marlon began his senior career with Porto PE in 2014. He spent his early career on various loan, with stints at Flamengo Arcoverde, Sport Recife, Central and Oeste.

On 12 November 2020, he moved to Paysandu on loan. Paysandu ended his loan and officially transferred him to the club on 9 February 2021. In total at Paysandu he had 53 appearances with 16 goals and 3 assists in the Campeonato Brasileiro Série C.

On 19 January 2023, he moved to Portugal with the Primeira Liga club Gil Vicente on a three-and-a-half-year contract.

On 17 January 2024, Gil Vicente sent Marlon on loan to Série B club Guarani until the end of the year.

== Honour ==
Paysandu

- Campeonato Paraense: 2021
- Copa Verde: 2022, 2025
