= Marcelo Benevenuto =

Brazilian footballer

Personal information
- Full name: Marcelo da Conceição Benevenuto Malaquias
- Date of birth: 7 January 1996 (age 30)
- Place of birth: Resende, Brazil
- Height: 1.80 m (5 ft 11 in)
- Position: Centre back

Team information
- Current team: Sport Recife
- Number: 5

Youth career
- Fluminense
- Resende
- 2016: → Botafogo (loan)
- 2016: Botafogo

Senior career*
Years	Team	Apps	(Gls)
2016–2021	Botafogo	142	(6)
2021	→ Fortaleza (loan)	43	(4)
2022–2025	Fortaleza	97	(1)
2024	→ Coritiba (loan)	27	(0)
2025	→ Criciúma (loan)	15	(0)
2026–	Sport Recife	32	(2)
- * Club domestic league appearances and goals as of 16 November 2026

Marcelo da Conceição Benevenuto Malaquias (born 7 January 1996), simply known as Marcelo Benevenuto, is a Brazilian footballer who plays as a central defender for Sport Recife.

== Club career ==
Born in Resende, Rio de Janeiro, Marcelo joined Botafogo in 2016, initially on loan from Resende. On 17 June 2016, he was bought outright and signed a contract until 2019.

Marcelo made his senior debut on 7 September 2016, coming on as a late substitute for Diego in a 1–0 home win against Fluminense for the Série A championship. Definitely promoted to the main squad ahead of the 2017 season, he became a regular starter during the club's Copa Libertadores run, and renewed his contract until 2020 on 13 February of that year.

== Honours ==
=== Club ===
Botafogo

- Campeonato Carioca: 2018

Fortaleza

- Campeonato Cearense: 2021, 2022, 2023
- Copa do Nordeste: 2022

==== Individual ====
- Campeonato Carioca Team of the Year: 2020
