= Ramon (footballer, born 1995) =

Brazilian association football player

Personal information
- Full name: Ramon Menezes Roma
- Date of birth: 3 May 1995 (age 31)
- Place of birth: Feira de Santana, Bahia, Brazil
- Height: 1.86 m (6 ft 1 in)
- Position: Centre-back

Team information
- Current team: Goiás (on loan from Sport)
- Number: 4

Youth career
- Bahia de Feira
- Vitória

Senior career*
Years	Team	Apps	(Gls)
2015–2019	Vitória	145	(2)
2017	→ Maccabi Tel Aviv (loan)	3	(0)
2020–2021	Cruzeiro	65	(5)
2022–2024	Atlético Goianiense	40	(0)
2023	→ CRB (loan)	14	(0)
2024–2025	Ceará	27	(3)
2025–	Sport	31	(2)
2026–	→ Goiás (loan)	19	(0)
- * Club domestic league appearances and goals as of 17 November 2026

Ramon Menezes Roma (born 3 May 1995), known as Ramon Menezes or Ramon, is a Brazilian footballer who plays as a centre-back for Goiás, on loan from Sport.

== Life and career ==
Ramon started his professional career on 6 February 2013, when he played for Bahia de Feira in a Campeonato Baiano match against Jacuipense. At that time, Ramon was only 17 years old. He, then, went to play two seasons for Bahia de Feira.

In 2014, Ramon moved to Vitória due to a partnership between the two clubs. At first, the defender played at Vitória's U20 team, but at the beginning of 2015, he was promoted to the senior team. On 8 March 2015 Ramon debuted for Vitória in a 0–0 draw against Juazeirense. He then gradually became one of the team's starters. On April 22, Vitória signed Ramon for four seasons. He went to become pivotal in Vitória's Série B campaign that year, which resulted in the club's promotion to Série A.

In 2017, Ramon was briefly loaned to Israeli club Maccabi Tel Aviv, where he played only 3 matches.

On 10 March 2020 Ramon signed with Cruzeiro. He debuted for the team on 15 March in a match against Coimbra Esporte Clube.

== Career statistics ==
As of match played 17 May 2025

Appearances and goals by club, season and competition
Club	Season	League			State League		National cup (Note: Includes Copa do Brasil, Israel State Cup)		Continental		Other		Total	
Club	Season	Division	Apps	Goals	Apps	Goals	Apps	Goals	Apps	Goals	Apps	Goals	Apps	Goals
Bahia de Feira	2013	—			14 (Note: Appearance(s) in Campeonato Baiano)	0	—		—		—		14	0
Bahia de Feira	2014	—			2	1	1	0	—		—		3	1
Bahia de Feira	Total		—		16	1	1	0	—		—		17	1
Vitória	2015	Série B	31	1	3	0	3	0	—		6 (Note: Appearance(s) in Copa do Nordeste)	1	43	2
Vitória	2016	Série A	29	0	12	1	4	0	2 (Note: Appearance(s) in Copa Sudamericana)	0	—		47	1
Vitória	2017	Série A	25	0	0	0	0	0	—		0	0	25	0
Vitória	2018	Série A	28	1	7	0	8	0	—		6	0	49	1
Vitória	2019	Série B	32	0	5	0	1	0	—		3	0	41	0
Vitória	Total		145	2	27	1	16	0	2	0	15	1	205	4
Maccabi Tel Aviv (loan)	2016-17	Israeli Premier League	3	0	—		0	0	0	0	0	0	3	0
Cruzeiro	2020	Série B	27	1	2 (Note: Appearance(s) in Campeonato Mineiro)	1	0	0	—		—		29	2
Cruzeiro	2021	Série B	28	3	12	0	4	0	—		—		44	3
Cruzeiro	Total		55	4	14	1	4	0	—		—		73	5
Atlético Goianiense	2022	Série A	14	0	8 (Note: Appearance(s) in Campeonato Goiano)	0	5	0	6	0	—		33	0
Atlético Goianiense	2023	Série B	7	0	11	0	1	0	—		—		19	0
Atlético Goianiense	Total		21	0	19	0	6	0	6	0	—		52	0
CRB (loan)	2023	Série B	15	0	0	0	0	0	—		—		15	0
Ceará	2024	Série B	16	2	6 (Note: Appearance(s) in Campeonato Cearense)	0	1	0	—		3	0	26	2
Ceará	2025	Série A	0	0	5	1	2	0	—		3	0	10	1
Ceará	Total		16	2	11	1	3	0	—		6	0	36	3
Sport Recife	2025	Série A	3	0	—		—		—		—		3	0
Career total			258	8	87	4	30	0	8	0	21	1	404	13

== Honours ==
Atlético Goianiense

- Campeonato Goiano: 2022

Ceará

- Campeonato Cearense: 2024, 2025
