= Thiago Couto =

Brazilian footballer

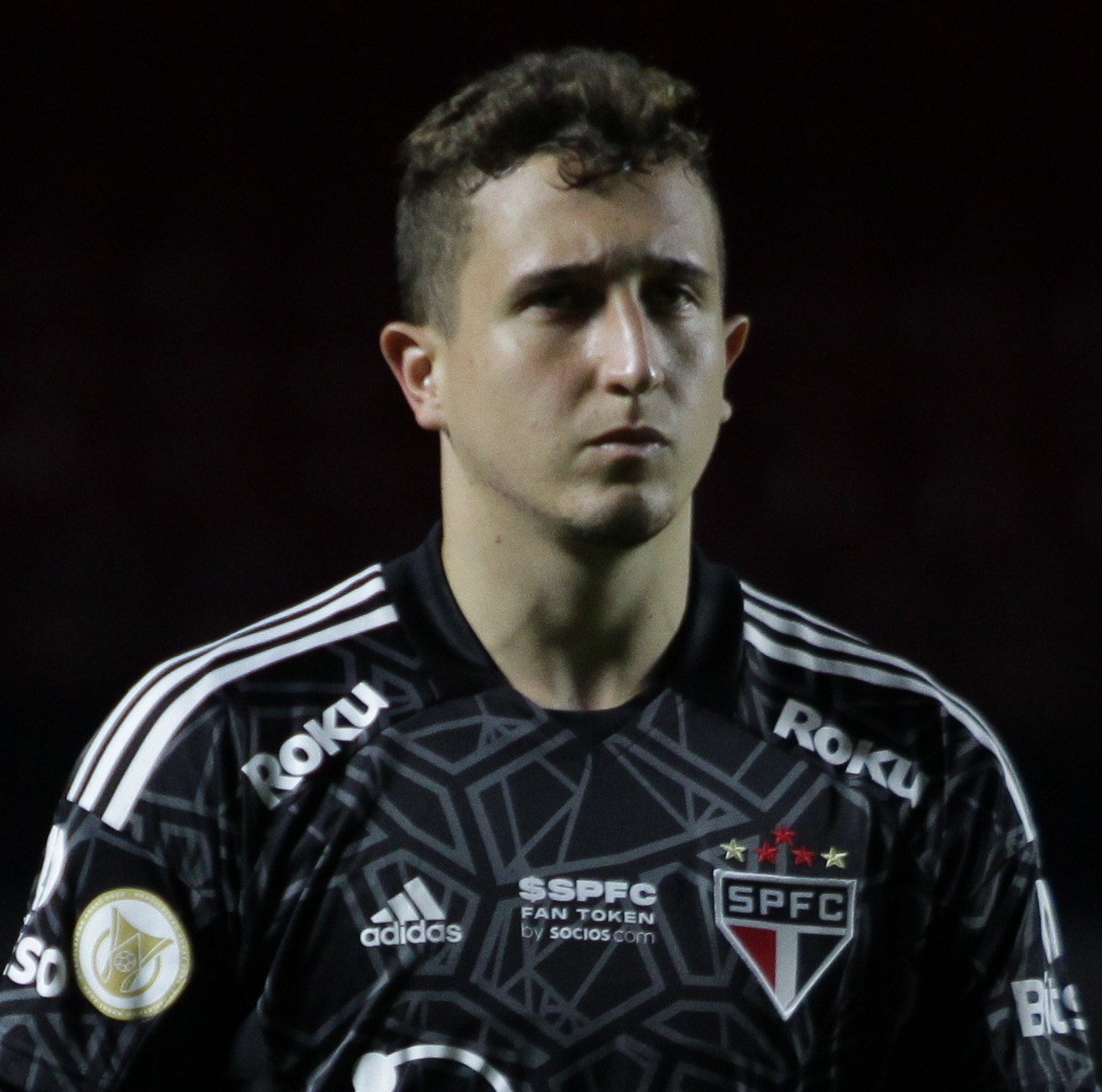
- Couto in 2022

Personal information
- Full name: Thiago Couto Wenceslau
- Date of birth: 26 March 1999 (age 27)
- Place of birth: São Paulo, Brazil
- Height: 1.88 m (6 ft 2 in)
- Position: Goalkeeper

Team information
- Current team: Sport Recife
- Number: 26

Youth career
- 2009–2019: São Paulo

Senior career*
Years	Team	Apps	(Gls)
2019–2023	São Paulo	4	(0)
2023	→ Juventude (loan)	39	(0)
2024–	Sport Recife	49	(0)
2025	→ Vitória (loan)	9	(0)
- * Club domestic league appearances and goals as of 16 November 2026

Thiago Couto Wenceslau (born 26 March 1999) is a Brazilian professional footballer who plays for Sport Recife as a goalkeeper.

== Career statistics ==
As of 21 October 2024

Appearances and goals by club, season and competition
Club	Season	League			State League		Cup		Continental		Other		Total	
Club	Season	Division	Apps	Goals	Apps	Goals	Apps	Goals	Apps	Goals	Apps	Goals	Apps	Goals
São Paulo	2019	Série A	0	0	—		—		—		—		4	0
São Paulo	2020	Série A	0	0	—		0	0	0	0	—		4	0
São Paulo	2021	Série A	0	0	0	0	0	0	0	0	—		4	0
São Paulo	2022	Série A	3	0	1	0	0	0	2 (Note: Appearances in the Copa Sudamericana)	0	0	0	6	0
São Paulo	Total		3	0	1	0	0	0	2	0	0	0	6	0
Juventude (loan)	2023	Série B	34	0	5	0	1	0	—		—		40	0
Sport Recife	2024	Série B	2	0	4	0	0	0	—		1	0	7	0
Career total			39	0	10	0	1	0	2	0	1	0	53	0

== Honours ==
São Paulo

- Copa São Paulo de Futebol Jr.: 2019

Sport Recife

- Campeonato Pernambucano: 2024
