= Chrystian Barletta =

Brazilian footballer (born 2001)

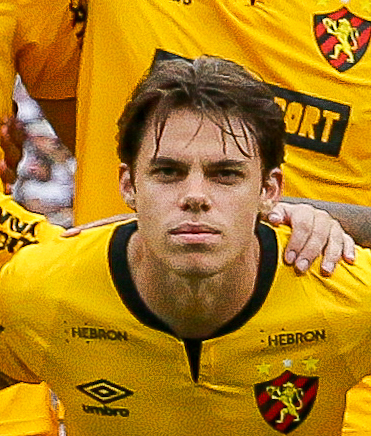
- Chrystian in 2025

Personal information
- Full name: Chrystian Amaral Barletta de Almeida
- Date of birth: 5 July 2001 (age 25)
- Place of birth: Limeira, Brazil
- Height: 1.78 m (5 ft 10 in)
- Position: Forward

Team information
- Current team: Sport Recife
- Number: 30

Youth career
- 2015–2016: Renovicente
- 2016–2020: Joinville

Senior career*
Years	Team	Apps	(Gls)
2019–2022	Joinville	34	(4)
2021	→ Bahia (loan)	10	(0)
2022–2023	São Bernardo	13	(4)
2022	→ Chapecoense (loan)	30	(4)
2023	Corinthians	3	(0)
2023–2024	Ceará	11	(3)
2024–	Sport Recife	116	(26)
- * Club domestic league appearances and goals as of 16 November 2026

Chrystian Amaral Barletta de Almeida (born 5 July 2001), known as Chrystian Barletta or just Chrystian, is a Brazilian professional footballer who plays as a forward for Sport Recife.

== Club career ==
=== Joinville ===
Born in Limeira, São Paulo, Chrystian began his career at SE Renovicente, and moved to Joinville in August 2016. He made his senior debut with the club on 9 October 2019, coming on as a second-half substitute and scoring his team's second in a 4–2 away loss against Avaí, for the year's Copa Santa Catarina.

In November 2019, Chrystian went on a trial at Sporting CP, but later returned to Joinville and appeared with the under-20 side in the 2020 Copa São Paulo de Futebol Júnior. Definitely promoted to the main squad on 20 January 2020, he featured sparingly before renewing his contract for two years on 31 December, and being immediately loaned to Bahia.

After mainly featuring for the under-23 team of Bahia, Chrystian returned to JEC on 1 June 2021, for the Série D. He then became a regular starter for the side, as they were knocked out in the round of 16 of the 2021 Série D, and narrowly avoided relegation in the 2022 Campeonato Catarinense.

=== São Bernardo ===
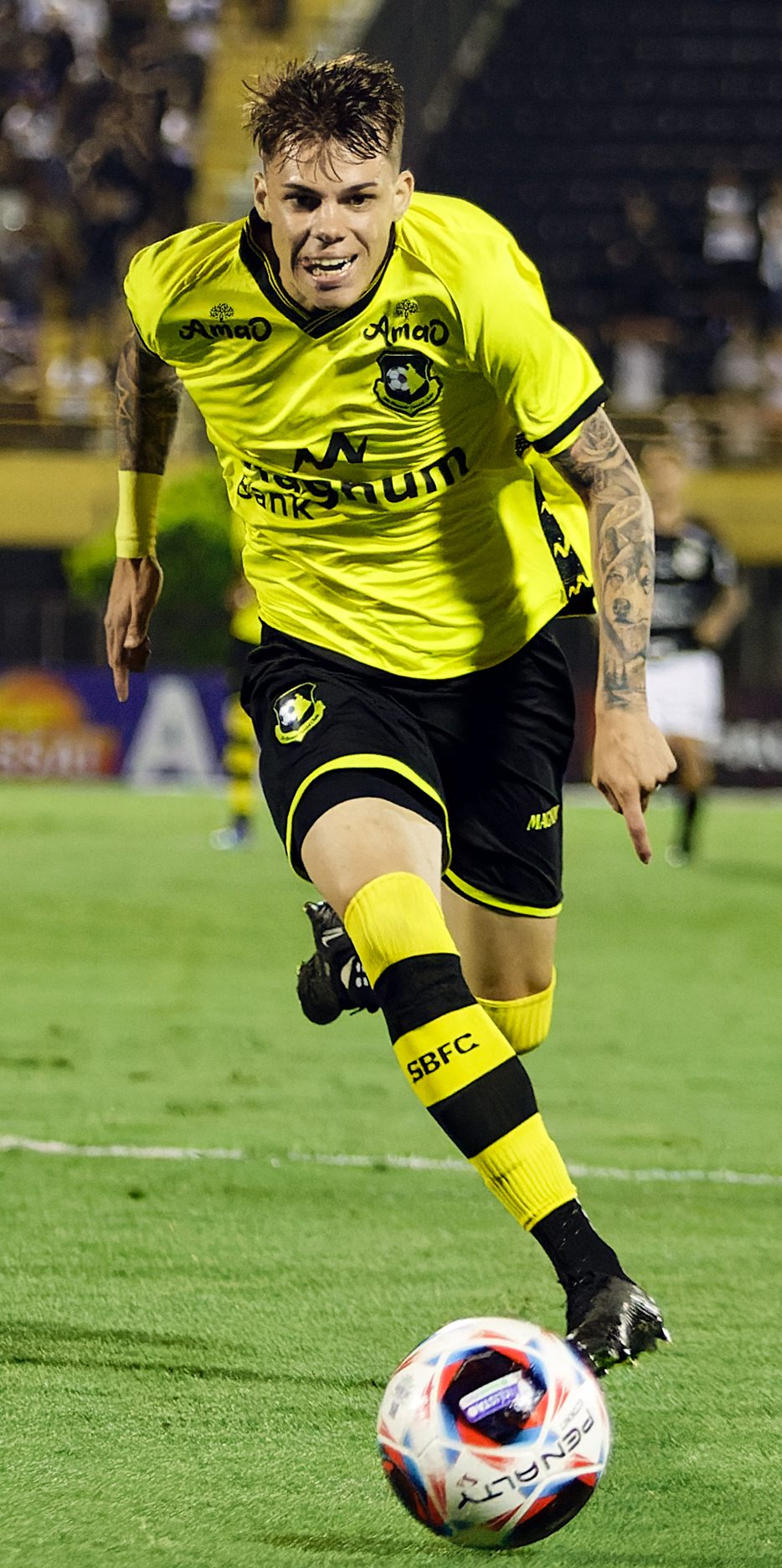
Chrystian with São Bernardo in 2023

On 15 March 2022, Chrystian agreed to join Série B side Chapecoense; announced on 6 April, the deal was later revealed as a loan from São Bernardo, as his economic and federative rights were acquired by Elenko Sports, and he was subsequently assigned to São Bernardo. He regularly featured for Chape during the 2022 Série B, as the club avoided relegation.

On 12 December 2022, Chrystian was announced by São Bernardo as an addition for the 2023 Campeonato Paulista. He impressed for the side during the tournament, scoring four times as the club reached the quarterfinals.

=== Corinthians ===
On 14 March 2023, São Bernardo announced the transfer of Chrystian to Corinthians.

== Career statistics ==
As of 25 November 2023.

Club	Season	League			State League		Cup		Continental		Other		Total	
Club	Season	Division	Apps	Goals	Apps	Goals	Apps	Goals	Apps	Goals	Apps	Goals	Apps	Goals
Joinville	2019	Série D	0	0	0	0	0	0	—		6 (Note: Appearance(s) in Copa Santa Catarina)	2	6	2
Joinville	2020	Série D	7	1	0	0	—		—		—		7	1
Joinville	2021	Série D	16	1	—		—		—		—		16	1
Joinville	2022	Catarinense	—		11	2	—		—		—		11	2
Joinville	Total		23	2	11	2	0	0	—		6	2	40	6
Bahia (loan)	2021	Série A	0	0	10	0	0	0	0	0	1 (Note: Appearance(s) in Copa do Nordeste)	0	11	0
Chapecoense	2022	Série B	30	4	—		—		—		—		30	4
São Bernardo	2023	Série C	0	0	13	4	0	0	—		—		13	4
Corinthians	2023	Série A	3	0	—		2	0	0	0	—		5	0
Ceará	2023	Série B	11	3	—		—		—		—		11	3
Sport Recife	2024	Série B	0	0	0	0	0	0	—		—		0	0
Career total			67	9	34	6	2	0	0	0	7	2	110	17

== Honours ==
Bahia

- Copa do Nordeste: 2021
