= Luiz Henrique (footballer, born 1998) =

Brazilian footballer

Personal information
- Full name: Luiz Henrique dos Santos Júnior
- Date of birth: 17 January 1998 (age 28)
- Place of birth: Salvador, Brazil
- Height: 1.78 m (5 ft 10 in)
- Position: Left back

Team information
- Current team: CRB (on loan from Juventus-SC)

Youth career
- 2008–2018: Grêmio

Senior career*
Years	Team	Apps	(Gls)
2017–2018	Grêmio	12	(0)
2017	→ Guarani-VA (loan)	1	(0)
2019	Cruzeiro-RS	13	(0)
2019–	Juventus-SC	28	(1)
2019	→ Brusque (loan)	5	(0)
2020	→ Atlético Goianiense (loan)	0	(0)
2020–2021	→ Mirassol (loan)	17	(0)
2021	→ Londrina (loan)	41	(3)
2022	→ Bahia (loan)	43	(2)
2023–	→ CRB (loan)	7	(0)
- * Club domestic league appearances and goals as of 20 December 2021

Luiz Henrique dos Santos Júnior (born 17 January 1998), commonly known as Luiz Henrique, is a Brazilian footballer who plays as left back for CRB, on loan from Juventus-SC, he can also play as a left winger.

== Career statistics ==
As of 2 November 2021

Club	Season	League			State League		Cup		Continental		Other		Total	
Club	Season	Division	Apps	Goals	Apps	Goals	Apps	Goals	Apps	Goals	Apps	Goals	Apps	Goals
Grêmio	2017	Série A	0	0	0	0	0	0	0	0	0	0	0	0
Grêmio	2018	Série A	0	0	0	0	0	0	0	0	12 (Note: Appearance(s) in Copa FGF)	0	12	0
Guarani-VA (loan)	2017	Gaúcho Série A2	—		1	0	—		—		0	0	1	0
Cruzeiro-RS	2019	Gaúcho Série A2	—		13	0	—		—		0	0	13	0
Juventus-SC	2019	Catarinense Série B	—		16	1	—		—		0	0	16	1
Juventus-SC	2020	Catarinense	—		12	0	—		—		0	0	12	0
Juventus-SC	Total		—		28	1	—		—		0	0	28	1
Brusque (loan)	2019	Copa Santa Catarina	—		—		—		—		5 (Note: Appearance(s) in Copa Santa Catarina)	0	5	0
Atlético Goianiense (loan)	2020	Série A	0	0	0	0	0	0	—		0	0	0	0
Mirassol (loan)	2020	Série D	17	0	—		—		—		0	0	17	0
Londrina (loan)	2021	Série B	23	2	14	1	—		—		0	0	37	3
Career total			40	2	56	2	0	0	0	0	17	0	113	4

== Honours ==
Brusque

- Copa Santa Catarina: 2019

Mirassol

- Campeonato Brasileiro Série D: 2020

Londrina

- Campeonato Paranaense: 2021
