= Sport Club do Recife =

Coordinates: 8°3′46.63″S 34°54′10.73″W

Sport Recife
- Full name: Sport Club do Recife
- Nicknames: Leão (Lion); Leão do Norte (Lion of the North); Leão da Ilha (Lion of the Island)
- Founded: 13 May 1905; 121 years ago
- Ground: Ilha do Retiro
- Capacity: 32,983
- President: Matheus Souto Maior
- Head coach: Mariano Soso
- League: Campeonato Brasileiro Série B Campeonato Pernambucano
- 2025 2025: Série A, 20th of 20 (relegated); Pernambucano, 1st of 10 (champions)
- Website: sportrecife.com.br
Home colours	Away colours	Third colours

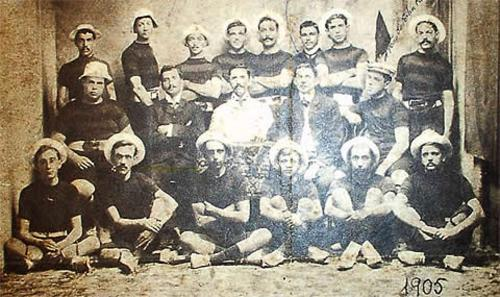
1905 Sport Recife team

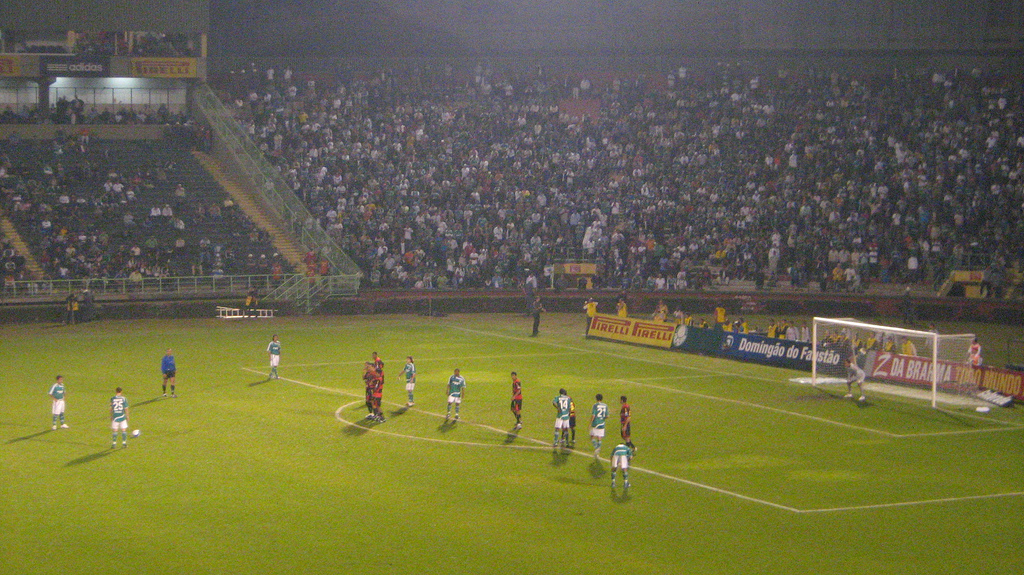
A match between Sport Recife and Palmeiras in the 2007 Brasileirão

Sport Club do Recife (Portuguese pronunciation: [(i)ˈspɔʁtʃi ˈklub(i) du ʁeˈsifi]), commonly known as Sport Recife or simply Sport, is a Brazilian sports club, located in Recife, Pernambuco. Founded in 1905, the club currently competes in the Campeonato Brasileiro Série B, the second division of football in Brazil, and in the Campeonato Pernambucano, the state of Pernambuco's top state league division.

In football, the club has won six CBD/CBF titles, including three national and three regional. Its greatest achievement is winning the 2008 Copa do Brasil. The club also disputes the status of champion of the 1987 Campeonato Brasileiro with Flamengo, as Sport Recife won the official league sanctioned by CBF, while Flamengo won the separate Copa União with the top clubs of Brazil. In addition, it also won 1 Campeonato Brasileiro Série B, 3 Copa do Nordeste and 45 Campeonato Pernambucano.

In addition to professional football, the club also participates in women's football and Olympic sports, such as rowing, swimming, hockey, basketball, futsal, volleyball, table tennis, taekwondo, judo and athletics.

Their historical rival is Náutico, and they both dispute the Clássico dos Clássicos. The derby against Santa Cruz is called the Clássico das Multidões, while the derby with América is called the Clássico dos Campeões.

== History ==
=== Foundation and early years ===
Sport Club do Recife was founded on 13 May 1905 by Guilherme de Aquino Fonseca, a member of a wealthy family in Pernambuco who found a love for football while studying engineering at the University of Cambridge in England. The club were the first recorded football club in the state of Pernambuco. Sport played their first match on 22 June 1905, drawing 2–2 against a team called English Eleven, a team formed by employees working for English companies in Recife.

The Campeonato Pernambucano was established in 1916, and Sport won the competition's first two titles. From 1923 to 1925, Sport won the competition three consecutive times, and became tricampeão (three-time champion).

=== International tours and military government years ===
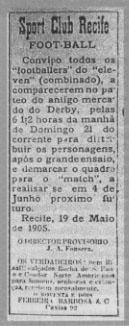
Invitation to the first game of the Lion

Sport Recife celebrated their 50th anniversary in 1955 by winning their 15th state title. In 1957, the club toured Europe. A total of 17 matches were played, with 6 wins, 3 draws, and 8 defeats. These matches include the 5–3 loss against Real Madrid, which was the first night game at Santiago Bernabéu Stadium.

Sport Recife participated in the 1963 International Soccer League, finishing fourth in their group, with 2 wins, 2 draws, and 2 defeats.

As a result of a dispute with the Federação Pernambucana de Futebol (FPF), Sport did not participate in the 1978 Campeonato Pernambucano.

=== First National league title ===
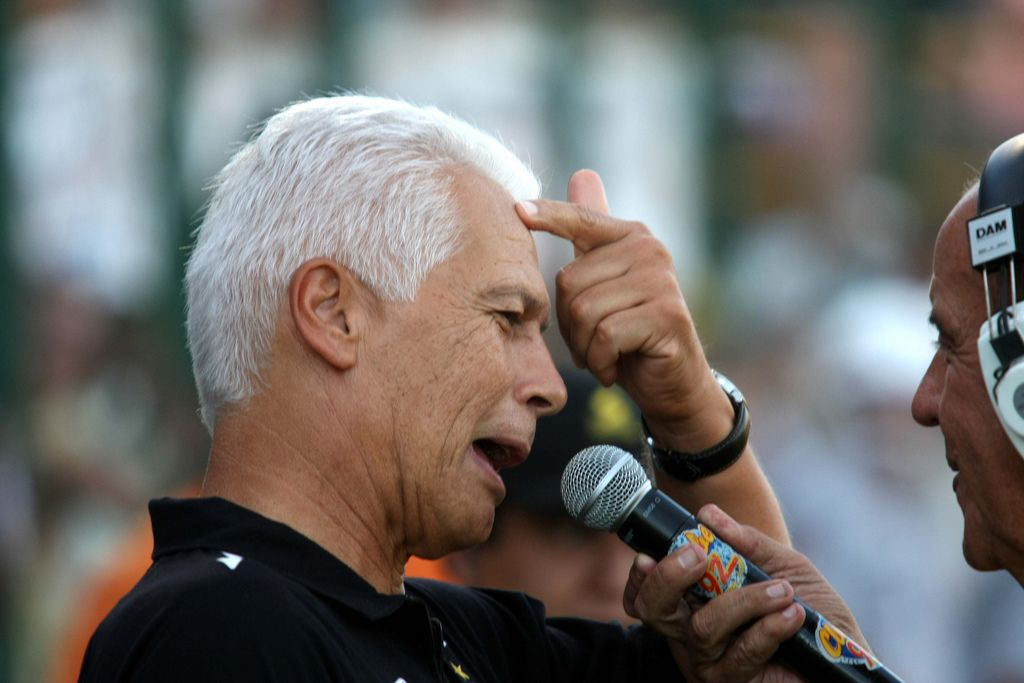
Émerson Leão led the successful 1987 campaign with Sport.

The 1987 Campeonato Brasileiro/Copa União resulted in Sport's first national title, conquered in common justice. However, the club did not officially receive this title until 30 years later, in 2017. This was due to a dispute with Flamengo, who also claimed to have won the title, since the latter, champion of the 1987 championship, as well as Internacional, refused to compete in a quadrangular crossing with the finalist teams of Module B, in the case of Sport and Guarani. After topping group B in both the 1st and 2nd rounds Sport beat Bangu 5–4 on aggregate in the semi-final, and then Guarani 3–2 in the final. By winning the title, they qualified for the 1988 Copa Libertadores, but failed to qualify for the next stages of the competition, finishing third in their group, although with a notable 5–0 victory over Alianza Lima.

A terrible 1989 league campaign resulted in the club's relegation. However, they won the 1990 Série B, with a 1–1 draw on aggregate against Atlético Paranaense in the final, but were awarded the title due to their better record across the season. Led by Givanildo Oliveira, Sport won the 1st edition of the Copa do Nordeste in 1994, beating hosts CRB on penalties after a 0–0 draw in normal time.

=== 21st century ===
In 2000, Sport won the Copa do Nordeste for the 2nd time, this time under the command of coach Celso Roth after a 2–2 draw against Vitória, again winning the title due to a superior record. In the next Copa do Nordeste edition, Sport finished as runner up, losing 3–1 to Bahia.

In 2006 Sport were promoted to the 2007 Serie A by finishing second in the league table, after five years in Série B.

Sport became the first club from Northeastern Brazil to win the Copa do Brasil, beating Corinthians on away goals in the 2008 final. By winning the cup, Sport contested its second Copa Libertadores in 2009, and had a great start, finishing first of a group containing LDU, Colo-Colo and Palmeiras. They were drawn against Palmeiras in the next round, but were defeated on penalties, after drawing 1–1 on aggregate. In the second half of 2009, Sport disputed the Brasileirão, but could not repeat the excellent first half of the year, and finished in last place with a 4–0 defeat to São Paulo on the last matchday, being relegated to Série B with four managers throughout the season.

O Leão da Ilha returned to Série A for the 2012 season, going through three managers – Helio dos Anjos, Mazola Júnior, and Paulo Gusmão, as they were relegated again with a seventeenth-placed finish. Although they were in Serie B, Sport inherited a spot in the 2013 Copa Sudamericana by regulation of CBF towards the remnants of the Copa do Brasil. Leão were eliminated by Libertad of Paraguay with two losses in the 2nd phase, after eliminating rivals Náutico.

2014 was a great year for Sport: they returned to Serie A, won their third Copa do Nordeste, 40th Campeonato Pernambucano, and finished 11th in the league, which ensured them a place in the following edition of the Copa Sudamericana.

Although the club did not win any titles in 2015, Sport had a very good year, and kept coach Eduardo Baptista. The start of the year was poor, with Sport being eliminated from the state league by third division club Salgueiro. The club entered the Copa Sudamericana in the second stage, where they beat Bahia 4–2 on aggregate with an incredible comeback, as Bahia had won the first leg 1–0. In the next stage, they faced Argentine club Huracán, where they were eliminated after losing 4–1 on aggregate (1-1, 0–3). In the 2015 Série A, the club had its best campaign since 2000, finishing 6th in the table with 59 points; Sport went through 15 matches in the top 4 and was the league leader in five of them. However, after this great run, Sport went through a 10-match winless run, which saw the club drop to eleventh and caused the resignation of Baptista. After the arrival of Paulo Roberto Falcão, the club's performances improved, although the goal of qualifying for the Copa Libertadores was not met.

In 2016 Sport finished 14th in the Serie A and qualified to the 2017 Copa Sudamericana. In the Copa Sudamericana, the club were knocked out by Junior in the quarter-finals, losing 2–0 on aggregate (0-0, 2–0), after eliminating Danubio on penalties (3–0, 0–3), Arsenal de Sarandí (2–0, 1–2), and Ponte Preta (3–1, 0–1). André Felipe was the club's most important player in the Sudamericana campaign, scoring four goals, including two goals in the first leg and one in the second leg against Arsenal de Sarandí.

A pior campanha de um clube nordestino na Série A do Campeonato Brasileiro na era dos pontos corridos (desde 2003) pertence ao Sport (em 2025) e ao América-RN (em 2007), ambos com 17 pontos, mas o time pernambucano ficou com o critério pior por ter somado apenas 2 vitórias contra 4 da equipe potiguar.

== Honours ==
=== Official tournaments ===
National
Competitions	Titles	Seasons
Campeonato Brasileiro Série A	1	1987
Copa do Brasil	1	2008
Campeonato Brasileiro Série B	1	1990
Regional
Competitions	Titles	Seasons
Copa do Nordeste	3	1994, 2000, 2014
Torneio Norte-Nordeste	1^{s}	1968
State
Competitions	Titles	Seasons
Campeonato Pernambucano	46	1916, 1917, 1920, 1923, 1924, 1925, 1928, 1938, 1941, 1942, 1943, 1948, 1949, 1953, 1955, 1956, 1958, 1961, 1962, 1975, 1977, 1980, 1981, 1982, 1988, 1991, 1992, 1994, 1996, 1997, 1998, 1999, 2000, 2003, 2006, 2007, 2008, 2009, 2010, 2014, 2017, 2019, 2023, 2024, 2025, 2026
Copa Pernambuco	3	1998, 2003, 2007

- record
- ^{s} shared record

=== Others tournaments ===
==== International ====
- Leopoldo Casado International Tournament (1): 1980
- Troféu Ariano Suassuna (4): 2015, 2016, 2017, 2018

==== National ====
- Qualificatório da Taça Ouro (1): 1980
- Troféu Roberto Gomes Pedrosa (Módulo Amarelo) (1): 1987

==== Regional and Inter-state ====
- Zona Norte-Nordeste da Taça Brasil (1): 1962
- Torneio Paraíba-Pernambuco (1): 1965

==== State ====
- Torneio Início de Pernambuco (18): 1920, 1923, 1924, 1925, 1927, 1928, 1932, 1935, 1940, 1945, 1957, 1958, 1959, 1960, 1966, 1968, 1974, 1977

=== Runners-up ===
- Copa do Brasil (1): 1989
- Campeonato Brasileiro Série B (2): 2006, 2019
- Copa dos Campeões (1): 2000
- Copa do Nordeste (4): 2001, 2017, 2022, 2023
- Torneio Norte-Nordeste (1): 1970
- Campeonato Pernambucano (24): 1919, 1922, 1940, 1951, 1954, 1957, 1963, 1964, 1965, 1966, 1967, 1968, 1969, 1971, 1972, 1973, 1986, 1987, 1990, 2011, 2012, 2013, 2016, 2021
- Copa Pernambuco (2): 2000, 2005

=== Women's Football ===
- Campeonato Pernambucano de Futebol Feminino (11): 1999, 2000, 2007, 2008, 2009, 2017, 2018, 2022, 2023, 2024, 2025

== Current squad ==
=== First team ===
As of 30 October 2026

Note: Flags indicate national team as defined under FIFA eligibility rules; some limited exceptions apply. Players may hold more than one non-FIFA nationality.

No.	Pos.	Nation	Player
3	DF	BRA	Marcelo Ajul
5	DF	BRA	Marcelo Benevenuto
6	MF	BRA	Biel (on loan from Brusque)
7	MF	BRA	Patrick de Paula
8	MF	BRA	Juan Alano
9	FW	BRA	Pedro Perotti (on loan from Chapecoense)
10	MF	URU	Carlos de Pena
12	GK	BRA	Denis
15	MF	BRA	Murilo Rhikman (on loan from Cruzeiro)
19	FW	BRA	Neto Pessoa
20	FW	URU	Diego Hernández
21	GK	BRA	Brenno
23	MF	BRA	Zé Gabriel
25	FW	BRA	Clayson
26	GK	BRA	Thiago Couto
27	DF	BRA	Claudinho (on loan from Vitória)
28	DF	BRA	Habraão (on loan from Athletico Paranaense)

No.	Pos.	Nation	Player
29	MF	BRA	Willian Oliveira
30	FW	BRA	Chrystian Barletta
31	FW	BRA	Marlon Douglas
33	DF	BRA	Kayky Almeida (on loan from Fluminense)
42	GK	BRA	Adriano
47	MF	BRA	Fábio Matheus
54	MF	BRA	Adriel
60	DF	BRA	Felipinho
63	DF	BRA	Patrick
66	DF	BRA	Rafinha
68	DF	BRA	Augusto Pucci
76	DF	BRA	Raí Lopes
77	FW	BRA	Dudu Teodora
80	MF	VEN	Kervin Andrade (on loan from Maccabi Tel Aviv)
88	MF	BRA	Fernando Sobral
96	DF	BRA	Edson Lucas (on loan from Ferroviária)

=== Youth team ===
Note: Flags indicate national team as defined under FIFA eligibility rules; some limited exceptions apply. Players may hold more than one non-FIFA nationality.

No.	Pos.	Nation	Player
55	DF	BRA	Victor Hugo
67	FW	BRA	Felipinho
71	FW	BRA	Lipão
73	DF	BRA	Caio Moura
75	FW	BRA	Arthur Maron
78	DF	BRA	Richarlyson Lira

No.	Pos.	Nation	Player
82	MF	BRA	Jefinho
84	MF	BRA	Fernandinho
88	FW	BRA	Ruan Melo
90	GK	BRA	Erick
—	MF	BRA	Cláudio

=== Out on loan ===
Note: Flags indicate national team as defined under FIFA eligibility rules; some limited exceptions apply. Players may hold more than one non-FIFA nationality.

No.	Pos.	Nation	Player
—	GK	BRA	Davi (at Maguary until 30 September 2026)
—	DF	BRA	Cordeiro (at Atlético de Alagoinhas until 30 September 2026)
—	DF	BRA	Felype Gabriel (at Maguary until 30 September 2026)
—	DF	BRA	Italo Lucas (at Brusque until 30 November 2026)
—	DF	BRA	Matheus Alexandre (at Remo until 31 December 2026)
—	DF	BRA	Ramon Menezes (at Goiás until 30 November 2026)
—	MF	BRA	Breno Santos (at Santa Catarina until 30 September 2026)

No.	Pos.	Nation	Player
—	MF	BRA	Pedro Martins (at Brusque until 30 November 2026)
—	MF	BRA	Luciano (at Cianorte until 30 September 2026)
—	FW	BRA	Carlos Alberto (at Kalba until 31 December 2026)
—	FW	BRA	Gustavo Coutinho (at Atlético Goianiense until 30 November 2026)
—	FW	BRA	Micael (at São José-SP until 30 October 2026)
—	FW	ARG	Rodrigo Atencio (at Independiente Rivadavia until 31 December 2026)

=== Current technical staff ===
- (Portugal) Pepa – Head Coach
- (Brazil) Daniel Cerqueira – Assistant Coach
- (Brazil) César Lucena – Assistant Coach
- (Brazil) Ricardo Henriques – Fitness Coach
- (Brazil) Edvaldo Tacão – Fitness Coach
- (Brazil) Vitor Hugo – Fitness Coach
- (Brazil) Junior Matos – Goalkeeper Trainer

== Top scorers ==
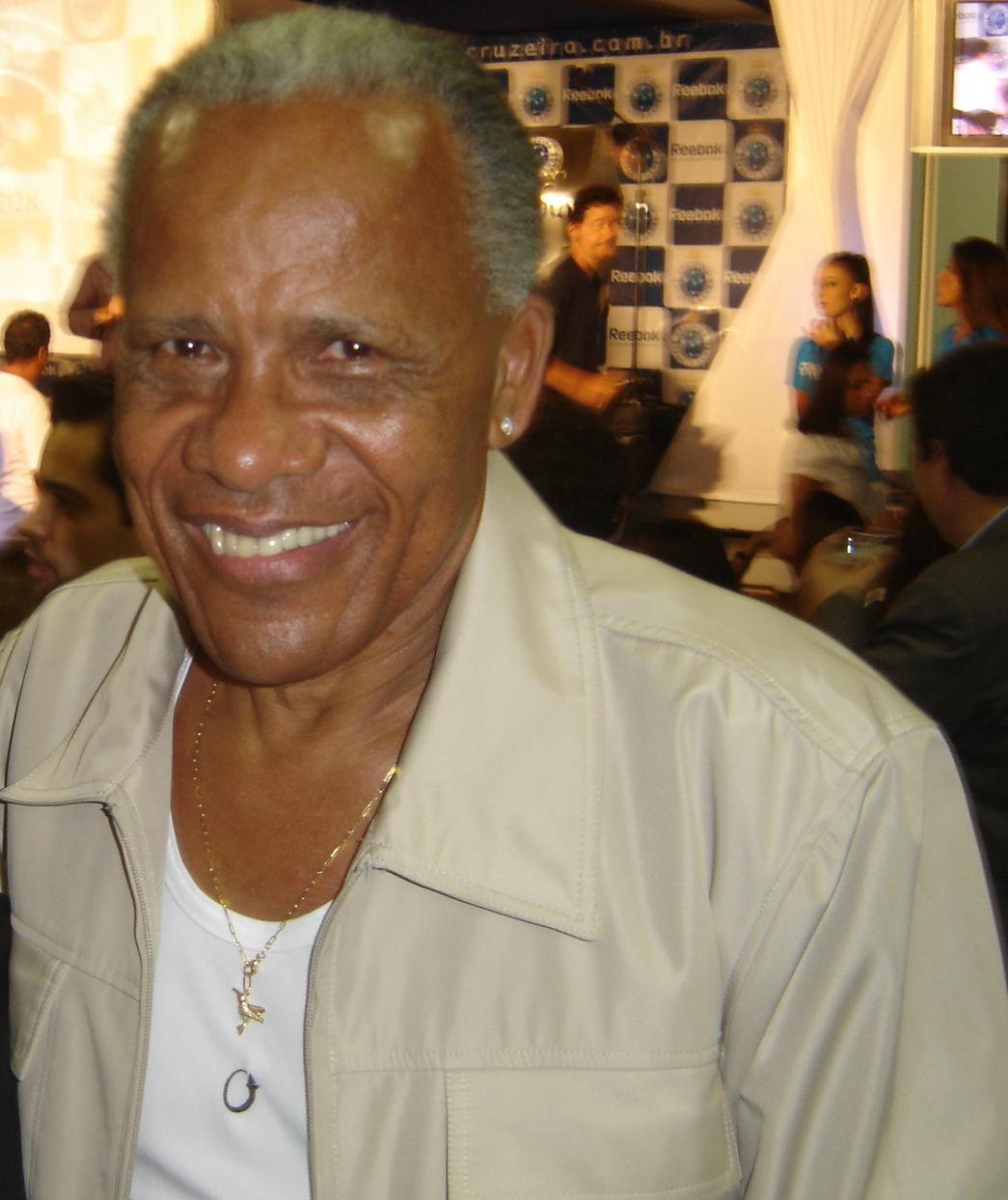
Dadá Maravilha is the sixth leading scorer.

Sport Recife Top Scorers
Rank	Player	Goals
1º	Traçaia	202
2º	Djalma Freitas	161
3º	Leonardo	133
4º	Luís Carlos	108
5º	Naninho	105
6º	Dadá Maravilha	94
7º	Marcílio de Aguiar	93
8º	Raúl Bentancor	91
9º	Roberto Coração de Leão	89
10º	Bé	80

== Supporters ==
In 2013, a study named Sport Recife as the 13th most supported club in Brazil, with around 2.4 million supporters countrywide. Supporters of the club are called Leonine and Sportistas.

The club has various organized supporter groups:

- Brava IIha
- Gang da Ilha
- Comando Rasta
- Torcida Jovem
- Treme Terra
- Tropa de Elite
- Sport Chopp
- Turminha do Vigor
- Leões da Ilha

== Rivalries ==
=== Santa Cruz ===
The "Derby of Crowds" (Clássico das Multidões) is the football encounter between the two largest fanbases from Pernambuco. Sport has a considerable advantage over their rivals in head to head results, with 236 wins against 169 from Santa Cruz.

=== Náutico ===
The Derby of Derbies (Clássico dos Clássicos) is the third oldest derby in the country, after the Clássico Vovô and the Grenal. It brings together the two oldest teams in Pernambuco, with Sport also having a large advantage overall, with 218 wins in the fixture, while Náutico won 187.

=== América-PE ===
The Champions Derby (Clássico dos Campeões) is one of the most ancient and classical derbies of Pernambuco, and is named that way because until the late 1930s, Sport and its archrival America were together the two teams with the highest number of titles, and were also the two main clubs of Recife. The derby lost popularity after the decline of América-PE, since they haven't won any trophies since the 1940s. América are currently at the second division of the Campeonato Pernambucano.

=== Esporte Clube Bahia ===
The rivalry between Sport and Bahia is one of the biggest regional rivalries of Brazil. Both are the most successful football clubs from the Northeast region, as they are the only two clubs in the region to have won major national titles, and the clubs with most supporters across the region. The 2010s marked the growth of their rivalry, as both clubs' supporters saw their state rivals declining in comparison to them. Another important aspect about the rivalry is that Pernambuco and Bahia have their own rivalry, ranging from which is the most important state in the northeast region to which state deploys the best carnival in the country. The rivalry between states are nurtured the most between inhabitants of the state capitals, Recife and Salvador, which also are the cities where Sport Recife and Bahia are based.

== Facilities ==
=== Stadium ===
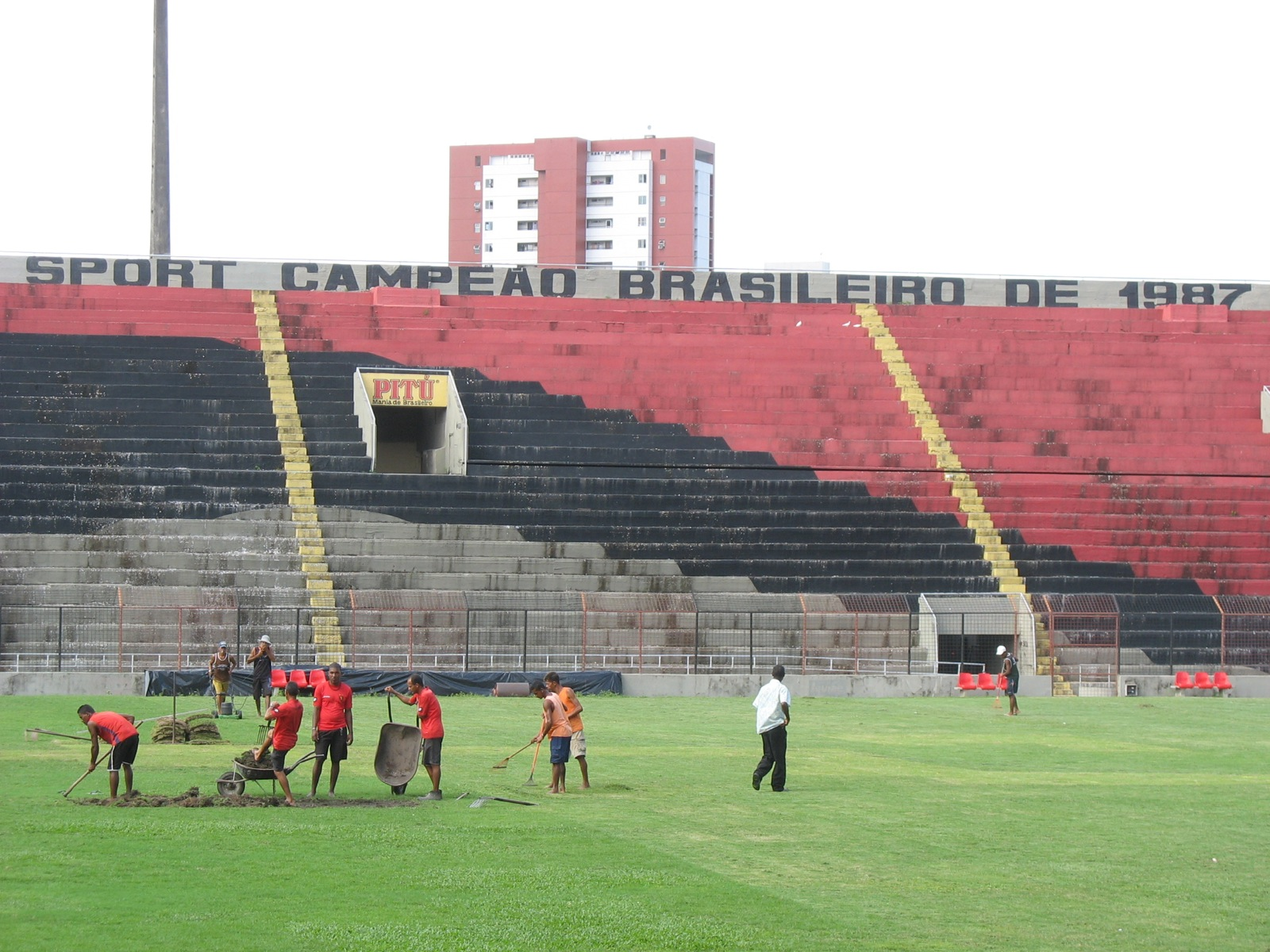
Estádio Ilha do Retiro

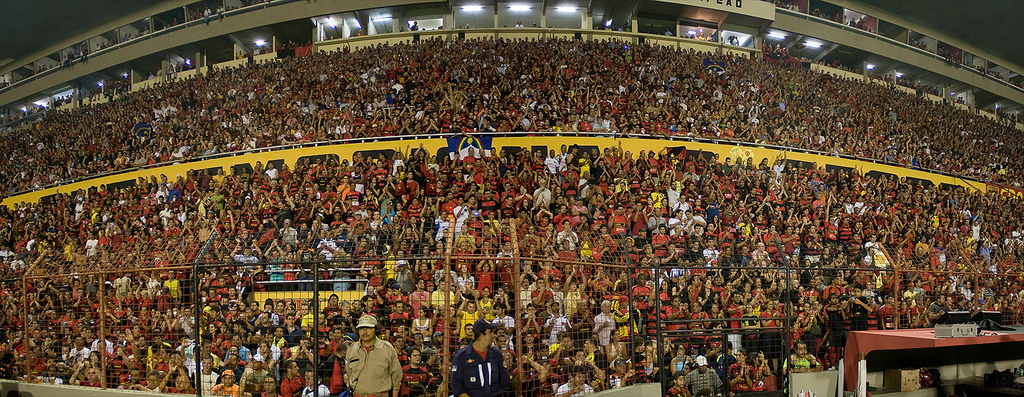
Estádio Ilha do Retiro – panaoramic view

- Avenida Malaquias

The stadium opened on 15 May 1918 with a match between America-PE and Flamengo. It belonged to Sport Recife from 1918 until 1937, and had a capacity for 8,000 people (2,000 being seated).

- Adelmar da Costa Carvalho Stadium (Ilha do Retiro Stadium)

Inaugurated on 4 July 1937, it is the club's current stadium, and was named after club president Adelmar da Costa Carvalho, but is better known as Iilha do Retiro due to the neighborhood where it is located. The stadium has a maximum capacity for 30,000. It was considered the best stadium in Northeast Brazil until the construction of the Arena Pernambuco in 2013, which is currently the best the Northeast because of its structure and FIFA standards.

=== Training Center ===
- CT Presidente José de Andrade Médicis (CT do Leão)

The CT Presidente José de Andrade Medici, also known as CT do Leão, is the club's training center for the professional team and all youth levels. Located in the city of Paulista, about 30 km from Recife, the site has a total area of 8 hectares (8,000 m^{2}). The complex underwent major improvements in recent years, to prepare for the 2013 FIFA Confederations Cup and 2014 FIFA World Cup.

The complex has 5 official fields, two hotels, a restaurant, a medical center, a gym, and dressing rooms. The training center was inaugurated on 9 September 2008.

== Symbols ==
=== Badge ===
The first coat of arms had nothing to do with the current one. In one of the first statutes of the club the coat of arms was well defined: "On an anchor, bearing the date 13 May 1905 on the arm, supported by a pair of oars crossing a mast containing a croquette, a lifeguard, and in the center a football between a cricket stick and a tennis racket, crossed and surrounded by the letters SCR, with the body containing the phrase 'Sport Club Recife'. Soon, the number 1 badge represented all sports practiced by the club at the time, from cricket to spearfishing.

However, the coat was seen as too complex, difficult to reproduce and did not contain the crimson-black colors. So in 1919 then President Arnaldo Loyo faced a challenge that was considered extremely difficult at the time: get Sport to Belém do Pará to play a series of five friendlies. During the tour, Sport won three games and lost two.

On 3 April 1919, Sport played a Remo-Paysandu combination for a French bronze trophy called the Lion of the North, which had sculptures including a Greek archer accompanied by an imposing lion. This was a competition which at the time was considered very difficult for any team from Pernambuco, as football in Para was more developed. To the surprise of Pará, Sport won 2–1 and won the trophy. The disappointment from opposing fans was such that a fan invaded the ship where the Crimson-Black club kept the trophy, and damaged its tail with an iron pipe. This incident inspired the development of a new coat of arms for the club, and as a result the lion was adopted as the new symbol of the club because it represented boldness, courage and winning spirit. Designer Armando Vieira dos Santos was responsible for creating it, which was based on Scottish heraldry arms.

The stars present in the current badge are: 2 gold stars, for its two major titles (1987 Brasileirao Serie A and 2008 Copa do Brasil) and 1 silver star, for its minor titles (1990 Brasileirao Série B). The golden stars are larger than the silver one, and are located on the corners, while the silver star is smaller and is located in between the golden stars.

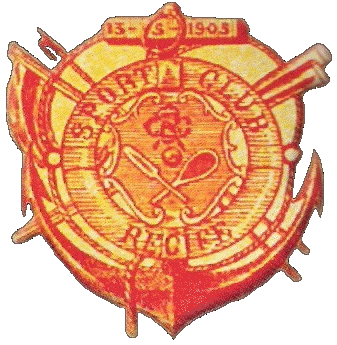
1905

1919–present

=== Anthem ===
The official anthem of the club was created by Eunitônio Edir Pereira.

=== Mascots ===
In 1919, after the club won the Lion of the North trophy, the lion was selected as the mascot, and one of the club's nicknames was created; Leão do Norte (Lion of the North).

The mascot is named Leo. It was created over 25 years ago by cartoonist Humberto Araujo, and since then has been illustrating the achievements of the club. Leo is present at all home games, and entertains the crowd at matches. The name Leo means lion in Latin.

== Colors and Uniforms ==
The official colors of the club are black, red and gold.

The uniforms of Sport are described in Article 8 of the 2nd chapter: In sports competitions, athletes from Sport Club do Recife will wear an official uniform, which will always have the SCR shield on their shirt, on their left side and at chest level, and obeys one of the following uniforms:

a) Shirt with black and red stripes, with white or black shorts and black socks;

b) White shirt, shorts and socks

c) Black shirt, shorts and socks, with pink accents;

d) Golden shirt, shorts and socks, with discreet pink and black details;

=== Kit Manufacturers ===
- (Brazil) Penalty (1973–74)
- (Brazil) Malharia Terres (1977–80)
- (Brazil) FAIXA (1980)
- (Germany) Adidas (1980–82)
- (France) Le Coq Sportif (1983–87)
- (Brazil) Everest (1987)
- (Brazil) MR Artigos Esportivos (1988–89)
- (Brazil) Topper (1988–92)
- (Brazil) Finta (1992–94)
- (Brazil) Rhumell (1995–98)
- (Brazil) Topper (1998–08)
- (Italy) Lotto (2008–2013)
- (Germany) Adidas (2014–2017)
- (United States) Under Armour (2018)
- (United Kingdom) Umbro (2019–present)

== Presidents ==
This is a list of Sport Recife presidents since 2000:

- Luciano Bivar (1997–2001)
- Fernando Pessoa (2001–02)
- Severino Otavio (Branquinho) (2003–04)
- Luciano Bivar (2005–06)
- Milton Bivar Caldas (2007–08)
- Silvio Alexandre Guimaraes (2009–10)
- Gustavo Dubueux (2011–12)
- Luciano Bivar (2013)
- Joao Humberto Martorelli (2014–16)
- Arnaldo Barros Jr. (2017–18)
- Gustavo Dubueux (2019)
- Leonardo Lopes (2021)
- Yuri Romão (2021-presente)

== Publications about Sport ==
Books

- SILVESTRE, Rafael. Copa do Brasil 2008 – Há cinco anos o Brasil era rubro-negro. BB Editora, São Paulo, 2013.
- FILHO, Costa. Meu Coração de Leão – Memórias de um Paraibano Louco pelo Sport. Mídia Gráfica e Editora, João Pessoa, 2013.
- BIVAR, Fernando Caldas. Coração Rubro-negro: "A união faz o Leão". Independente, Recife, 2005.
- CORDEIRO, Carlos Celso e; GUEDES, Luciano. Sport – Retrospecto – 1905 a 1959. Recife, 2005.
- CORDEIRO, Carlos Celso e; GUEDES, Luciano. Sport – Retrospecto – 1960 a 1979. Recife, 2006.
- CORDEIRO, Carlos Celso e; GUEDES, Luciano. Sport – Retrospecto – 1980 a 1999. Recife, 2007.
- SANTOS, Manoel Heleno Rodrigues dos. Memória Rubro-negra (1905–55). M. Inojosa Editora, Recife, 1985.
- SANTOS, Manoel Heleno Rodrigues dos. Memória Rubro-negra II (1956–88). Editora Universitária da UFPE, Recife, 1992.
- SOUZA, Carlos Enrique de. Histórias da Garra Rubro-negra. Editora Comunicarte, Recife, 1993.
