= 2024 Associação Atlética Ponte Preta season =

Ponte Preta
2024 season
- Chairman: Marco Antônio Eberlin
- Manager: João Brigatti; Nelsinho Baptista; Nenê Santana (c); João Brigatti
- Stadium: Moisés Lucarelli
- Série B: 17th (relegated)
- Campeonato Paulista: Quarter-final
Home colours	Away colours

The 2024 season was Associação Atlética Ponte Preta's 125th season in existence and seventh consecutive in the Campeonato Brasileiro Série B. In addition, Ponte Preta competed in the Campeonato Paulista at the state level.

== Current squad ==
As of 31 October 2024

Note: Flags indicate national team as defined under FIFA eligibility rules; some limited exceptions apply. Players may hold more than one non-FIFA nationality.

No.	Pos.	Nation	Player
1	GK	BRA	Pedro Rocha
2	DF	BRA	Igor Inocêncio
3	DF	BRA	Edson
4	DF	BRA	Mateus Silva
5	DF	BRA	Heitor Roca (on loan from São José-SP)
6	DF	BRA	Sérgio Raphael
7	MF	BRA	Dodô (on loan from Coimbra)
8	MF	BRA	Emerson Santos
9	FW	BRA	Jeh
10	MF	BRA	Élvis
11	FW	BRA	Iago Dias
12	GK	BRA	William Assmann
13	DF	BRA	Joílson
14	DF	BRA	Luiz Felipe
15	DF	BRA	Castro
16	DF	BRA	Jean Carlos
18	DF	BRA	Emerson
19	FW	BRA	Renato

No.	Pos.	Nation	Player
20	DF	BRA	João Gabriel
21	MF	BRA	Ramon Carvalho
22	GK	BRA	Vinicius Ferrari
23	DF	BOL	Luis Haquín
29	FW	BRA	Éverton Brito
30	GK	BRA	Luan
33	DF	ARG	Gabriel Risso
35	FW	BRA	Gabriel Novaes (on loan from Red Bull Bragantino)
44	DF	BRA	Nilson Júnior
58	DF	BRA	Thomas Luciano (on loan from Gil Vicente)
70	MF	BRA	Guilherme Portuga (on loan from Portuguesa)
77	FW	BRA	Matheus Régis (on loan from São Bernardo)
80	MF	BRA	Hudson (on loan from Portuguesa)
—	GK	BRA	Guilherme Viana
—	DF	BRA	Guilherme Nicolodi
—	MF	BRA	Diego Domene
—	MF	BRA	Diogo Mora

== Pre-season and friendlies ==
Win Draw Loss Fixtures

10 January 2024 Friendly	Ponte Preta	0–0	Lemense	Campinas

== Competitions ==
=== Overall record ===
Competition	First match	Last match	Starting round	Record							
Competition	First match	Last match	Starting round	Pld	W	D	L	GF	GA	GD	Win %
Campeonato Brasileiro Série B	April 2024		Matchday 1	0	0	0	0	0	0	+0	—
Campeonato Paulista	20 January 2024			1	0	1	0	1	1	+0	0.00
Total				1	0	1	0	1	1	+0	0.00

Last updated: 20 January 2024

=== Campeonato Brasileiro Série B ===
==== League table ====
Pos	Team	Pld	W	D	L	GF	GA	GD	Pts	Promotion or relegation
15	Chapecoense	38	11	11	16	34	45	−11	44	
16	CRB	38	11	10	17	38	45	−7	43	
17	Ponte Preta (R)	38	10	8	20	37	55	−18	38	Relegation to 2025 Campeonato Brasileiro Série C
18	Ituano (R)	38	11	4	23	43	63	−20	37	Relegation to 2025 Campeonato Brasileiro Série C
19	Brusque (R)	38	8	12	18	24	44	−20	36	Relegation to 2025 Campeonato Brasileiro Série C

Source: CBF
Rules for classification: 1) points; 2) wins; 3) goal difference; 4) goals scored; 5) head-to-head results (only between 2 teams); 6) fewest red cards; 7) fewest yellow cards; 8) drawing of lots.
(R) Relegated

==== Results summary ====
Overall								Home						Away					
Pld	W	D	L	GF	GA	GD	Pts	W	D	L	GF	GA	GD	W	D	L	GF	GA	GD
38	10	8	20	37	55	−18	38	9	2	8	26	25	+1	1	6	12	11	30	−19

==== Matches ====
21 April 2024 1	Ponte Preta	1–1	Coritiba	Campinas
18:00 (UTC−3)	Joílson 13'	Report	Joílson 59' (o.g.)	Stadium: Estádio Moisés Lucarelli; Attendance: 6,232; Referee: Emerson Ricardo de Almeida Andrade

28 April 2024 2	Goiás	3–0	Ponte Preta	Goiânia
18:30 (UTC−3)	Marcão 31'; Edson 61'; Breno 72'	Report		Stadium: Estádio da Serrinha; Attendance: 6,784; Referee: Paulo José Souza Mourão

6 May 2024 3	Ponte Preta	3–0	Amazonas	Campinas
20:00 (UTC−3)	Gabriel Novaes 17', 33'; Dodô 90+4'	Report		Stadium: Estádio Moisés Lucarelli; Attendance: 4,446; Referee: Emerson Souza Silva

11 May 2024 4	Operário Ferroviário	1–1	Ponte Preta	Ponta Grossa
17:00 (UTC−3)	Willian Machado 25'	Report	Dodô 90+7'	Stadium: Estádio Germano Krüger; Attendance: 3,979; Referee: Wagner do Nascimento Magalhães

15 May 2024 5	Ponte Preta	1–2	Santos	Campinas
21:30 (UTC−3)	Raphael 53'	Report	Gil 17'; Giuliano 23'	Stadium: Estádio Moisés Lucarelli; Attendance: 7,498; Referee: Marcelo de Lima Henrique

21 May 2024 6	Chapecoense	0–0	Ponte Preta	Chapecó
17:00 (UTC−3)		Report		Stadium: Arena Condá; Attendance: 5,254; Referee: Bruno Pereira Vasconcelos

26 May 2024 7	Ituano	2–0	Ponte Preta	Itu
16:00 (UTC−3)	Thonny Anderson 56'; Wálber 60'	Report		Stadium: Estádio Novelli Júnior; Attendance: 1,745; Referee: Jonathan Benkenstein Pinheiro

2 June 2024 8	Ponte Preta	4–2	CRB	Campinas
16:00 (UTC−3)	Jeh 47'; Élvis 65'; Matheus Régis 78'; Renato 90+7'	Report	Anselmo Ramon 62'; Gegê 75'	Stadium: Estádio Moisés Lucarelli; Attendance: 5,104; Referee: Arthur Gomes Rabelo

9 June 2024 9	América–MG	2–0	Ponte Preta	Belo Horizonte
18:30 (UTC−3)	Dudu Vieira 14' (o.g.); Fabinho 51'	Report		Stadium: Arena Independência; Attendance: 2,910; Referee: Caio Max Augusto Vieira

15 June 2024 10	Ponte Preta	1–0	Novorizontino	Campinas
17:00 (UTC−3)	Gabriel Novaes 33'	Report		Stadium: Estádio Moisés Lucarelli; Attendance: 4,426; Referee: Kléber Ariel Goncalves da Silva

19 June 2024 11	Botafogo–SP	2–0	Ponte Preta	Ribeirão Preto
21:00 (UTC−3)	Matheus Barbosa 55'; Patrick Brey 90+1'	Report		Stadium: Estádio Santa Cruz; Attendance: 2,681; Referee: Bruno Pereira Vasconcelos

25 June 2024 12	Ponte Preta	3–1	Ceará	Campinas
21:00 (UTC−3)	Castro 10'; Jeh 34'; Dodô 59'	Report	Kaique 68'	Stadium: Estádio Moisés Lucarelli; Attendance: 3,538; Referee: André Luiz Skettino Policarpo Bento

30 June 2024 13	Guarani	1–1	Ponte Preta	Campinas
18:30 (UTC−3)	Luan Dias 24'	Report	Jeh 54'	Stadium: Estádio Brinco de Ouro; Attendance: 9,626; Referee: Flávio Rodrigues de Souza

5 July 2024 14	Brusque	0–0	Ponte Preta	Brusque
21:00 (UTC−3)		Report		Stadium: Estádio Augusto Bauer; Attendance: 499; Referee: Fábio Augusto Santos Sa Junior

12 July 2024 15	Ponte Preta	4–2	Mirassol	Campinas
19:00 (UTC−3)	Emerson Santos 29'; Ramon 49'; Jeh 71'; Matheus Régis 90+10'	Report	Gabriel 26'; Luiz Otávio 89'	Stadium: Estádio Moisés Lucarelli; Attendance: 4,370; Referee: Bruno Pereira Vasconcelos

20 July 2024 16	Paysandu	1–0	Ponte Preta	Belém
18:00 (UTC−3)	Paulinho Bóia 37'	Report		Stadium: Estádio da Curuzu; Attendance: 12,323; Referee: Yuri Elino Ferreira da Cruz

23 July 2024 17	Ponte Preta	2–0	Vila Nova	Campinas
21:30 (UTC−3)	Igor Inocêncio 38'; Élvis 69'	Report		Stadium: Estádio Moisés Lucarelli; Attendance: 4,410; Referee: Wagner do Nascimento Magalhães

27 July 2024 18	Sport Recife	3–1	Ponte Preta	São Lourenço da Mata
18:00 (UTC-3)	Domínguez 24', 83'; Ortiz 90+8'	Report	Jeh 45+2'	Stadium: Arena Pernambuco; Attendance: 14,037; Referee: Lucas Guimaraes Rechatiko Horn

4 August 2024 19	Ponte Preta	1–0	Avaí	Campinas
16:00 (UTC−3)	Jeh 78'	Report		Stadium: Estádio Moisés Lucarelli; Attendance: 5,795; Referee: Savio Pereira Sampaio

11 August 2024 20	Coritiba	1–1	Ponte Preta	Curitiba
16:00 (UTC−3)	Robson 44'	Report	Gabriel Novaes 90+6'	Stadium: Estádio Couto Pereira; Attendance: 17,254; Referee: Fábio Augusto Santos Sá Junior

16 August 2024 21	Ponte Preta	1–1	Goiás	Campinas
19:00 (UTC−3)	Dodô 88'	Report	Mateus Gonçalves 42'	Stadium: Estádio Moisés Lucarelli; Attendance: 5,503; Referee: Rodrigo José Pereira de Lima

20 August 2024 22	Amazonas	2–1	Ponte Preta	Manaus
21:00 (UTC−3)	Luan Santos 8'; Matheus Serafim 48'	Report	Igor Inocêncio 56'	Stadium: Arena da Amazônia; Attendance: 6,543; Referee: Thaillan Azevedo Gomes

23 August 2024 23	Ponte Preta	0–1	Operário Ferroviário	Campinas
21:30 (UTC−3)		Report	Daniel 74'	Stadium: Estádio Moisés Lucarelli; Attendance: 3,369; Referee: Fernando Antônio Mendes de Salles

30 August 2024 24	Santos	2–2	Ponte Preta	Santos
21:30 (UTC−3)	Giuliano 24'; João Basso 33'	Report	Jeh 56'; Dodô 90+1'	Stadium: Estádio Urbano Caldeira; Attendance: 6,946; Referee: Sávio Pereira Sampaio

9 September 2024 25	Ponte Preta	0–2	Chapecoense	Campinas
21:30 (UTC−3)		Report	João Paulo 36'; Mário Sérgio 87'	Stadium: Estádio Moisés Lucarelli; Attendance: 3,748; Referee: Caio Max Augusto Vieira

13 September 2024 26	Ponte Preta	1–4	Ituano	Campinas
21:30 (UTC−3)	Iago Dias 16'	Report	Bruno Xavier 4', 68', 74'; Thonny Anderson 56'	Stadium: Estádio Moisés Lucarelli; Attendance: 3,309; Referee: João Vitor Gobi

19 September 2024 27	CRB	0–1	Ponte Preta	Maceió
19:30 (UTC−3)		Report	Dodô 90+5'	Stadium: Estádio Rei Pelé; Attendance: 5,272; Referee: Paulo Belence Alves dos Prazeres Filho

24 September 2024 28	Ponte Preta	0–2	América–MG	Campinas
21:30 (UTC−3)		Report	Adyson 36'; Jonathas de Jesus 86'	Stadium: Estádio Moisés Lucarelli; Attendance: 3,229; Referee: Jonathan Benkenstein Pinheiro

30 September 2024 29	Novorizontino	2–1	Ponte Preta	Novo Horizonte
21:00 (UTC−3)	Neto Pessoa 4', 37'	Report	Iago Dias 75'	Stadium: Estádio Doutor Jorge Ismael de Biasi; Attendance: 5,502; Referee: Felipe Fernandes de Lima

5 October 2024 30	Ponte Preta	1–0	Botafogo–SP	Campinas
17:00 (UTC−3)	Gabriel Novaes 10'	Report		Stadium: Estádio Moisés Lucarelli; Attendance: 4,052; Referee: Edina Alves Batista

12 October 2024 31	Ceará	1–0	Ponte Preta	Fortaleza
17:00 (UTC−3)	Mugni 21'	Report		Stadium: Castelão; Attendance: 30,420; Referee: Alisson Sidnei Furtado

20 October 2024 32	Ponte Preta	0–1	Guarani	Campinas
18:30 (UTC−3)		Report	Matheus Bueno 69'	Stadium: Estádio Moisés Lucarelli; Attendance: 15,262; Referee: Wilton Pereira Sampaio

23 October 2024 33	Ponte Preta	2–0	Brusque	Campinas
19:00 (UTC−3)	Gabriel Novaes 56'; Renato 84'	Report		Stadium: Estádio Moisés Lucarelli; Attendance: 2,436; Referee: Wagner do Nascimento Magalhães

26 October 2024 34	Mirassol	3–0	Ponte Preta	Mirassol
17:00 (UTC−3)	Neto Moura 40'; Chico 89'; Iury Castilho 90+2'	Report		Stadium: Estádio José Maria de Campos Maia; Attendance: 4,997; Referee: Matheus Delgado Candançan

4 November 2024 35	Ponte Preta	1–2	Paysandu	Campinas
21:00 (UTC−3)	Mateus Silva 33'	Report	Borasi 38'; García 81'	Stadium: Estádio Moisés Lucarelli; Attendance: 3,088; Referee: Rodrigo Jose Pereira de Lima

11 November 2024 36	Vila Nova	2–1	Ponte Preta	Goiânia
18:30 (UTC−3)	Alesson 39', 84'	Report	Élvis 32' (pen.)	Stadium: Estádio Onésio Brasileiro Alvarenga; Attendance: 2,003; Referee: Emerson Ricardo de Almeida Andrade

16 November 2024 37	Ponte Preta	0–4	Sport Recife	Campinas
21:30 (UTC-3)		Report	Chrystian Barletta 7'; Domínguez 34'; Rafael Thyere 48'; Fabinho 85'	Stadium: Estádio Moisés Lucarelli; Attendance: 4,767; Referee: Rafael Rodrigo Klein

22 November 2024 38	Avaí	2–1	Ponte Preta	Florianópolis
20:00 (UTC−3)	Mário Sérgio 43'; Maurício Garcez 63'	Report	Renato 71'	Stadium: Estádio da Ressacada; Attendance: 1,105; Referee: Raimundo Rodrigues de Oliveira Junior

=== Campeonato Paulista ===
==== Results summary ====
Overall								Home						Away					
Pld	W	D	L	GF	GA	GD	Pts	W	D	L	GF	GA	GD	W	D	L	GF	GA	GD
13	4	5	4	16	16	0	17	1	5	0	8	6	+2	3	0	4	8	10	−2

Last updated: 20 January 2024.

==== Matches ====
The match schedule was released on 7 December 2023.

20 January 2024 1	Ponte Preta	1–1	Mirassol	Campinas
20:15 (UTC−3)	Jeh 20'	Report	Gabriel 43'	Stadium: Estádio Moisés Lucarelli; Attendance: 4,102; Referee: Vinícius Gonçalves Dias Araújo

25 January 2024 2	Santos	3–1	Ponte Preta	Santos
19:30 (UTC−3)	Giuliano 12', 56'; Julio Furch 18'	Report	Élvis 78' (pen.)	Stadium: Vila Belmiro; Attendance: 10,733; Referee: Fabiano Monteiro dos Santos

28 January 2024 3	Ponte Preta	0–0	Inter de Limeira	Campinas
16:00 (UTC−3)		Report		Stadium: Estádio Moisés Lucarelli; Attendance: 3,910; Referee: Douglas Marques das Flores

31 January 2024 4	Portuguesa	0–2	Ponte Preta	São Paulo
19:30 (UTC−3)		Report	Jeh 44'; Dodô 89'	Stadium: Estádio do Canindé; Attendance: 2,428; Referee: Luiz Flávio de Oliveira

4 February 2024 5	Ponte Preta	3–3	São Bernardo	Campinas
20:00 (UTC−3)	Felipinho 32'; Jeh 45'; Élvis 90+2'	Report	Matheus Régis 11'; João Carlos 45+2'; Lucas Lima 51'	Stadium: Estádio Moisés Lucarelli; Attendance: 3,334; Referee: Raphael Claus

7 February 2024 6	Botafogo–SP	0–3	Ponte Preta	Ribeirão Preto
19:00 (UTC−3)		Report	Iago Dias 2'; Jeh 40'; Ramon 79'	Stadium: Estádio Santa Cruz; Attendance: 3,923; Referee: Matheus Delgado Candançan

10 February 2024 7	Ponte Preta	2–0	São Paulo	Campinas
18:00 (UTC−3)	Gabriel Risso 75'; Renato 90+2'	Report		Stadium: Estádio Moisés Lucarelli; Attendance: 11,451; Referee: Fabiano Monteiro dos Santos

14 February 2024 8	Red Bull Bragantino	1–0	Ponte Preta	Bragança Paulista
21:30 (UTC−3)	Eduardo Sasha 64'	Report		Stadium: Estádio Nabi Abi Chedid; Attendance: 3,101; Referee: Lucas Canetto Bellote

17 February 2024 9	Ponte Preta	1–1	Ituano	Campinas
20:00 (UTC−3)	Iago Dias 42'	Report	Zé Carlos 76'	Stadium: Estádio Moisés Lucarelli; Attendance: 5,312; Referee: Edina Alves Batista

25 February 2024 10	Corinthians	0–1	Ponte Preta	São Paulo
20:00 (UTC−3)		Report	Iago Dias 6'	Stadium: Neo Química Arena; Attendance: 41,375; Referee: Matheus Delgado Candançan

3 March 2024 11	Ponte Preta	1–1	Novorizontino	Campinas
17:00 (UTC−3)	Gabriel Novaes 54'	Report	Fabrício Daniel 39'	Stadium: Estádio Moisés Lucarelli; Attendance: 8,089; Referee: Douglas Marques das Flores

10 March 2024 12	Santo André	1–0	Ponte Preta	Santo André
16:00 (UTC−3)	Alexiel 69'	Report		Stadium: Estádio Bruno José Daniel; Attendance: 2,340; Referee: Edina Alves Batista

==== Quarter-final ====
16 March 2024	Palmeiras	5–1	Ponte Preta	Barueri
18:00 (UTC−3)	López 3', 19', 70'; Murilo 38'; Piquerez 66'	Report	Renato 90'	Stadium: Arena Barueri; Attendance: 18,119; Referee: Luiz Flávio de Oliveira

== Statistics ==
=== Appearances and goals ===
No.	Pos	Nat	Player	Total		Campeonato Brasileiro Série B		Campeonato Paulista	
No.	Pos	Nat	Player	Apps	Goals	Apps	Goals	Apps	Goals
Goalkeepers
	GK	(Brazil) BRA	Luan	0	0	0	0	0	0
	GK	(Brazil) BRA	Vinicius Ferrari	0	0	0	0	0	0
	GK	(Brazil) BRA	Pedro Rocha	0	0	0	0	0	0
	GK	(Brazil) BRA	Guilherme Viana	0	0	0	0	0	0
Defenders
	DF	(Brazil) BRA	Castro	0	0	0	0	0	0
	DF	(Brazil) BRA	Euller	0	0	0	0	0	0
	DF	(Brazil) BRA	Igor Inocêncio	0	0	0	0	0	0
	DF	(Brazil) BRA	Mateus Silva	0	0	0	0	0	0
	DF	(Brazil) BRA	Edson Junior	0	0	0	0	0	0
	DF	(Argentina) ARG	Gabriel Risso	0	0	0	0	0	0
	DF	(Bolivia) BOL	Luís Haquin	0	0	0	0	0	0
	DF	(Brazil) BRA	Nilson Júnior	0	0	0	0	0	0
Midfielders
	MF	(Brazil) BRA	Dodô	0	0	0	0	0	0
	MF	(Brazil) BRA	Felipe Amaral	0	0	0	0	0	0
	MF	(Brazil) BRA	Gabriel Santiago	0	0	0	0	0	0
	MF	(Brazil) BRA	Luiz Felipe	0	0	0	0	0	0
	MF	(Brazil) BRA	Wesley Fraga	0	0	0	0	0	0
	MF	(Brazil) BRA	Élvis Sanches	0	0	0	0	0	0
	MF	(Brazil) BRA	Felipinho	0	0	0	0	0	0
	MF	(Brazil) BRA	Léo Naldi	0	0	0	0	0	0
	MF	(Brazil) BRA	Ramon Silva	0	0	0	0	0	0
	MF	(Brazil) BRA	Emerson Santos	0	0	0	0	0	0
Forwards
	FW	(Brazil) BRA	Cristhyan Noto	0	0	0	0	0	0
	FW	(Brazil) BRA	Jeh	0	0	0	0	0	0
	FW	(Brazil) BRA	Renato	0	0	0	0	0	0
	FW	(Brazil) BRA	Iago Dias	0	0	0	0	0	0
	FW	(Colombia) COL	Paul Villero	0	0	0	0	0	0

Last updated: 20 January 2024
Source: Competitions
