= 2026 Clube Náutico Capibaribe season =

Náutico
2026 season
- Owner: Bruno Becker
- Manager: Hélio dos Anjos; Guilherme dos Anjos (c); Bruno Pivetti
- Stadium: Estádio dos Aflitos
- Série B: 15th
- Pernambucano: Runners-up
- Top goalscorer: League: Vinícius (9); All: Vinícius (12)
| Home colours | Away colours | Third colours |

The 2026 season was Náutico's 126th season in the club's history. Náutico competed in the Campeonato Pernambucano and Campeonato Brasileiro Série B.

== Squad ==
As of 7 September 2026

Note: Flags indicate national team as defined under FIFA eligibility rules; some limited exceptions apply. Players may hold more than one non-FIFA nationality.

| No. | Pos. | Nation | Player |
|---|---|---|---|
| 1 | GK | BRA | Muriel |
| 2 | DF | BRA | Arnaldo |
| 3 | DF | BRA | Betão |
| 5 | MF | BRA | Auremir |
| 6 | DF | BRA | Ryan Carlos |
| 7 | FW | BRA | Vinícius |
| 8 | MF | BRA | Wenderson |
| 9 | FW | BRA | Paulo Sérgio |
| 10 | MF | BRA | Jean Carlos (captain) |
| 11 | FW | BRA | Victor Andrade |
| 13 | DF | BRA | Índio |
| 14 | DF | BRA | Matheus Ribeiro |
| 15 | MF | BRA | Léo Oliveira |
| 19 | FW | BRA | Kauã Maranhão |
| 21 | MF | BRA | Felipe Redaelli |
| 22 | MF | ARG | Patricio Núñez |

| No. | Pos. | Nation | Player |
|---|---|---|---|
| 23 | DF | BRA | Igor Fernandes |
| 24 | FW | ARG | Benjamín Borasi (on loan from Sarmiento (Junín)) |
| 25 | DF | BRA | Mateus Silva |
| 27 | MF | BRA | Luiz Felipe |
| 29 | FW | BRA | Júnior Todinho |
| 34 | DF | BRA | Wanderson |
| 41 | MF | BRA | Samuel |
| 46 | DF | BRA | Gustavo Henrique (on loan from Red Bull Bragantino) |
| 55 | GK | URU | Gastón Guruceaga |
| 60 | DF | BRA | Luiz Paulo |
| 72 | FW | BRA | Derek (on loan from Atlético Goianiense) |
| 77 | MF | BRA | Juninho |
| 93 | DF | BRA | Reginaldo |
| — | GK | BRA | Léo Honorio |
| — | FW | BRA | Danielzinho |

== Statistics ==
=== Goalscorers ===
| Place | Pos. | Nat. | No. | Name | Campeonato Pernambucano | Série B | Total |
|---|---|---|---|---|---|---|---|
| 1 | FW | (Brazil) | 7 | Vinícius | 3 | 9 | 12 |
| 2 | FW | (Brazil) | 9 | Paulo Sérgio | 8 | 1 | 9 |
| 3 | MF | (Brazil) | 10 | Dodô | 3 | 5 | 8 |
| 4 | FW | (Brazil) | 29 | Júnior Todinho | 1 | 3 | 4 |
| 5 | FW | (Brazil) | 72 | Derek | 0 | 3 | 3 |
| 5 | MF | (Brazil) | 10 | Jean Carlos | 0 | 3 | 3 |
| 5 | FW | (Brazil) | 19 | Kauan Maranhão | 0 | 3 | 3 |
| 5 | FW | (Brazil) | 16 | Luiz Cláudio | 0 | 3 | 3 |
| 6 | FW | (Argentina) | 24 | Benjamín Borasi | 0 | 2 | 2 |
| 6 | FW | (Brazil) | 98 | Felipe Saraiva | 2 | 0 | 2 |
| 6 | DF | (Brazil) | 93 | Reginaldo | 1 | 1 | 2 |
| 6 | MF | (Brazil) | 11 | Victor Andrade | 0 | 2 | 2 |
| 6 | MF | (Brazil) | 8 | Wenderson | 1 | 1 | 2 |
| 7 | MF | (Brazil) | 78 | Danielzinho | 0 | 1 | 1 |
| 7 | DF | (Brazil) | 46 | Gustavo Henrique | 0 | 1 | 1 |
| 7 | MF | (Brazil) | 18 | Halanzinho | 0 | 1 | 1 |
| 7 | DF | (Brazil) | 23 | Igor Fernandes | 0 | 1 | 1 |
| 7 | MF | (Brazil) | 17 | Jonas Toró | 1 | 0 | 1 |
| 7 | MF | (Brazil) | 77 | Juninho | 1 | 0 | 1 |
| 7 | MF | (Brazil) | 15 | Léo índio | 0 | 1 | 1 |
| 7 | FW | (Brazil) | 31 | Rosa | 1 | 0 | 1 |
| 7 | FW | (Nigeria) | 34 | Samuel Otusanya | 1 | 0 | 1 |
| | | | | Own goals | 2 | 0 | 2 |
| | | | | Total | 25 | 41 | 66 |

=== Overall record ===
| Competition | First match | Last match | Starting round | Final position | Record | | | | | | | |
| Competition | First match | Last match | Starting round | Final position | Pld | W | D | L | GF | GA | GD | Win % |
|---|---|---|---|---|---|---|---|---|---|---|---|---|
| Pernambucano | 9 January | 8 March | First stage | Runners-up | 11 | 8 | 1 | 2 | 25 | 10 | +15 | 72.73 |
| Série B | 22 March | 11 November | Matchday 1 | 15th | 38 | 12 | 10 | 16 | 41 | 51 | −10 | 31.58 |
| Total | | | | | 49 | 20 | 11 | 18 | 66 | 61 | +5 | 40.82 |

Last updated: 11 November 2026
Source: Competitions

== Competitions ==
=== Campeonato Pernambucano ===
==== First stage ====
| 9 January 2026 1 | Náutico | 2–0 | Maguary | Recife |
| 20:30 (UTC-3) | Paulo Sérgio 58', 60' | Report | | Stadium: Estádio Eládio de Barros Carvalho (Aflitos); Attendance: 9,851; Referee: Rodrigo Pereira |

| 14 January 2026 2 | Decisão | 1–2 | Náutico | São Lourenço da Mata |
| 17:00 (UTC-3) | Kauan Diego 44' | Report | Felipe Saraiva 68'; Jonas Toró 75' | Stadium: Estádio Governador Carlos Wilson Campos (Arena Pernambuco); Attendance: 1,998; Referee: Paulo Belence Alves |

| 18 January 2026 3 | Náutico | 4–0 | Sport | Recife |
| 18:00 (UTC-3) | Dodô 24'; Vinícius 66'; Paulo Sérgio 72', 86' | Report | | Stadium: Estádio Eládio de Barros Carvalho (Aflitos); Attendance: 13,869; Referee: Diego Fernando Silva |

| 22 January 2026 4 | Jaguar | 0–4 | Náutico | São Lourenço da Mata |
| 20:00 (UTC-3) | | Report | Reginaldo 10'; Dodô 14'; Felipe Saraiva 21'; Otusanya 90' | Stadium: Estádio Governador Carlos Wilson Campos (Arena Pernambuco); Attendance: 1,999; Referee: José Woshigton |

| 25 January 2026 5 | Santa Cruz | 0–4 | Náutico | São Lourenço da Mata |
| 18:00 (UTC-3) | | Report | Dodô 38'; Vinícius 53', 59'; Junior Todinho 76' | Stadium: Estádio Governador Carlos Wilson Campos (Arena Pernambuco); Attendance: 13,232; Referee: Rodrigo Pereira |

| 28 January 2026 6 | Náutico | 0–1 | Retrô | Recife |
| 20:00 (UTC-3) | | Report | Douglas Santos 34' | Stadium: Estádio Eládio de Barros Carvalho (Aflitos); Attendance: 7,724; Referee: Diego Fernando |

| 31 January 2026 7 | Vitória das Tabocas | 2–3 | Náutico | Bonito |
| 16:30 (UTC-3) | Pedro Maycon 32' (pen.); Natan 45+2' | Report | Alan Pires 2' (o.g.); Juninho 45+3'; Rosa 78' | Stadium: Estádio Arthur Tavares Melo; Attendance: 596; Referee: Nairon Pereira de Lira |

==== Semi-finals ====
| 11 February 2026 | Santa Cruz | 0–1 | Náutico | São Lourenço da Mata |
| 20:00 (UTC-3) | | Report | Paulo Sérgio 17' | Stadium: Estádio Governador Carlos Wilson Campos (Arena Pernambuco); Attendance: 9,411; Referee: Bruno Arleu de Araújo |

| 22 February 2026 | Náutico | 2–0 | Santa Cruz | Recife |
| 18:00 (UTC-3) | Paulo Sérgio 45+6' (pen.), 72' | Report | | Stadium: Estádio Eládio de Barros Carvalho (Aflitos); Attendance: 16,181; Referee: Paulo César Zanovelli |

==== Finals ====
| 1 March 2026 | Sport | 3–3 | Náutico | Recife |
| 18:00 (UTC-3) | Iury Castilho 45+2', 64'; Yago Felipe 90' | Report | Paulo Sérgio 21' (pen.); Marcelo Benevenuto 53' (o.g.); Wenderson 90+5' | Stadium: Estádio Adelmar da Costa Carvalho (Ilha do Retiro); Attendance: 24,605; Referee: Marcelo de Lima Henrique |

| 8 March 2026 | Náutico | 0–3 | Sport | Recife |
| 18:00 (UTC-3) | | Report | Iury Castilho 14', 90+8' (pen.); Augusto 42' | Stadium: Estádio Eládio de Barros Carvalho (Aflitos); Attendance: 17,661; Referee: Paulo César Zanovelli |

=== Série B ===
| Pos | Team | Pld | W | D | L | GF | GA | GD | Pts | Promotion or relegation |
|---|---|---|---|---|---|---|---|---|---|---|
| 13 | Athletic | 38 | 11 | 15 | 12 | 46 | 46 | 0 | 48 | |
| 14 | Cuiabá | 38 | 11 | 14 | 13 | 34 | 33 | +1 | 47 | |
| 15 | Náutico | 38 | 12 | 10 | 16 | 41 | 51 | −10 | 46 | |
| 16 | Ceará | 38 | 11 | 11 | 16 | 39 | 48 | −9 | 44 | |
| 17 | Avaí (R) | 38 | 12 | 7 | 19 | 37 | 47 | −10 | 43 | Relegation to 2027 Campeonato Brasileiro Série C |

Source: CBF
Rules for classification: 1) points; 2) wins; 3) goal difference; 4) goals scored; 5) head-to-head results (only between 2 teams); 6) fewest red cards; 7) fewest yellow cards; 8) drawing of lots.
(R) Relegated

==== Results by round ====
| Round | 1 | 2 | 3 | 4 | 5 | 6 | 7 | 8 | 9 | 10 | 11 | 12 | 13 | 14 | 15 | 16 | 17 | 18 | 19 | 20 | 21 | 22 | 23 | 24 | 25 | 26 | 27 | 28 | 29 | 30 | 31 | 32 | 33 | 34 | 35 | 36 | 37 | 38 |
|---|---|---|---|---|---|---|---|---|---|---|---|---|---|---|---|---|---|---|---|---|---|---|---|---|---|---|---|---|---|---|---|---|---|---|---|---|---|---|
| Ground | H | A | H | A | H | A | A | H | A | H | A | H | A | A | H | H | A | A | H | A | H | A | H | A | H | H | A | H | A | H | A | H | H | A | A | H | H | A |
| Result | L | W | W | L | L | W | D | W | W | W | L | L | D | L | L | D | L | L | W | D | D | D | W | D | W | W | L | D | L | W | D | L | L | D | L | W | L | L |
| Position | 15 | 8 | 5 | 10 | 14 | 8 | 8 | 4 | 2 | 2 | 4 | 7 | 7 | 9 | 12 | 12 | 13 | 14 | 13 | 13 | 14 | 15 | 15 | 15 | 12 | 10 | 11 | 14 | 14 | 14 | 13 | 13 | 14 | 15 | 15 | 15 | 15 | 15 |
| Points | 0 | 3 | 6 | 6 | 6 | 9 | 10 | 13 | 16 | 19 | 19 | 19 | 20 | 20 | 20 | 21 | 21 | 21 | 24 | 25 | 26 | 27 | 30 | 31 | 34 | 37 | 37 | 38 | 38 | 41 | 42 | 42 | 42 | 43 | 43 | 46 | 46 | 46 |

A = Away; H = Home; W = Win; D = Draw; L = Loss

| 22 March 2026 1 | Náutico | 0–1 | Criciúma | Recife |
| 16:00 (UTC-3) | | Report | Waguininho 5' | Stadium: Estádio Eládio de Barros Carvalho (Aflitos); Attendance: 7,442; Referee: André Luiz Skettino Policarpo Bento |

| 1 April 2026 2 | Atlético Goianiense | 1–2 | Náutico | Goiânia |
| 19:00 (UTC-3) | Léo Jacó 40' | Report | Vinícius 77'; Igor Fernandes 81' | Stadium: Estádio Antônio Accioly; Attendance: 1,762; Referee: Lucas Guimaraes Rechatiko Horn |

| 4 April 2026 3 | Náutico | 1–0 | Ponte Preta | Recife |
| 18:00 (UTC-3) | Vinícius 77' (pen.) | Report | | Stadium: Estádio Eládio de Barros Carvalho (Aflitos); Attendance: 5,724; Referee: Paulo César Zanovelli |

| 11 April 2026 4 | Ceará | 1–0 | Náutico | Fortaleza |
| 20:30 (UTC-3) | Fernandinho 47' | Report | | Stadium: Estádio Governador Plácido Castelo (Castelão); Attendance: 14,032; Referee: Wilton Pereira Sampaio |

| 18 April 2026 5 | Náutico | 0–3 | São Bernardo | Recife |
| 18:00 (UTC-3) | | Report | Pedro Vitor 67'; Foguinho 82'; Echaporã 88' | Stadium: Estádio Eládio de Barros Carvalho (Aflitos); Attendance: 7,316; Referee: Alisson Sidnei Furtado |

| 27 April 2026 6 | Athletic | 0–1 | Náutico | São João del-Rei |
| 19:00 (UTC-3) | | Report | Victor Andrade 81' | Stadium: Estádio Joaquim Portugal (Arena Sicredi); Attendance: 2,701; Referee: Lucas Paulo Torezin |

| 2 May 2026 7 | Botafogo–SP | 1–1 | Náutico | Ribeirão Preto |
| 16:00 (UTC-3) | Everton Morelli 42' | Report | Victor Andrade 58' | Stadium: Estádio Santa Cruz; Attendance: 3,636; Referee: Ramon Abatti Abel |

| 10 May 2026 8 | Náutico | 4–0 | América Mineiro | Recife |
| 16:00 (UTC-3) | Vinícius 25', 72'; Wenderson 45+4'; Dodô 51' | Report | | Stadium: Estádio Eládio de Barros Carvalho (Aflitos); Attendance: 7,450; Referee: Bruno Pereira Vasconcelos |

| 16 May 2026 9 | Operário Ferroviário | 2–6 | Náutico | Ponta Grossa |
| 16:00 (UTC-3) | Pablo 6'; Gabriel Boschilia 66' (pen.) | Report | Derek 26'; Reginaldo 45+1'; Vinícius 52'; Júnior Todinho 62'; Dodô 67'; Paulo Sérgio 90+2' | Stadium: Estádio Germano Krüger; Attendance: 2,527; Referee: Arthur Gomes Rabelo |

| 22 May 2026 10 | Náutico | 1–0 | Cuiabá | Recife |
| 19:00 (UTC-3) | Júnior Todinho 70' | Report | | Stadium: Estádio Eládio de Barros Carvalho (Aflitos); Attendance: 11,703; Referee: Edina Alves Batista |

| 30 May 2026 11 | Sport | 2–0 | Náutico | Recife |
| 20:30 (UTC-3) | Chrystian Barletta 27' (pen.), 82' | Report | | Stadium: Estádio Adelmar da Costa Carvalho (Ilha do Retiro); Attendance: 19,926; Referee: Bráulio da Silva Machado |

| 9 June 2026 12 | Náutico | 0–1 | Fortaleza | Recife |
| 19:00 (UTC-3) | | Report | Mateus Silva 43' (o.g.) | Stadium: Estádio Eládio de Barros Carvalho (Aflitos); Attendance: 7,753; Referee: Lucas Casagrande |

| 14 June 2026 13 | Novorizontino | 2–2 | Náutico | Novo Horizonte |
| 19:00 (UTC-3) | Juninho 66'; Robson 78' | Report | Dodô 30', 75' (pen.) | Stadium: Estádio Doutor Jorge Ismael de Biasi; Attendance: 1,191; Referee: Gustavo Ervino Bauermann |

| 20 June 2026 14 | Vila Nova | 4–3 | Náutico | Goiânia |
| 19:00 (UTC-3) | Janderson 4', 18'; André Luis 8'; Ryan 42' | Report | Dodô 36'; Vinícius 65'; Luiz Cláudio 90+1' | Stadium: Estádio Onésio Brasileiro Alvarenga; Attendance: 6,544; Referee: Anderson Daronco |

| 28 June 2026 15 | Náutico | 0–1 | Goiás | Recife |
| 18:30 (UTC-3) | | Report | Djalma 25' | Stadium: Estádio Eládio de Barros Carvalho (Aflitos); Attendance: 7,265; Referee: Edina Alves Batista |

| 5 July 2026 16 | Náutico | 0–0 | Juventude | Recife |
| 20:30 (UTC-3) | | Report | | Stadium: Estádio Eládio de Barros Carvalho (Aflitos); Attendance: 2,701; Referee: Luiz Augusto Silveira Tisne |

| 12 July 2026 17 | Avaí | 2–0 | Náutico | Florianópolis |
| 16:00 (UTC-3) | Douglas Teixeira 6'; Daniel Penha 90+8' | Report | | Stadium: Estádio Aderbal Ramos da Silva (Ressacada); Attendance: 4,750; Referee: João Vitor Gobi |

| 16 July 2026 18 | CRB | 2–1 | Náutico | Maceió |
| 20:00 (UTC-3) | Mikael 33' (pen.); Crystopher 81' | Report | Kauan Maranhão 80' | Stadium: Estádio Rei Pelé; Attendance: 3,730; Referee: Lucas Paulo Torezin |

| 22 July 2026 19 | Náutico | 2–1 | Londrina | Recife |
| 21:30 (UTC-3) | Kauan Maranhão 34'; Jean Carlos 72' (pen.) | Report | Gabriel Lacerda 81' | Stadium: Estádio Eládio de Barros Carvalho (Aflitos); Attendance: 4,113; Referee: Bruno Mota Correia |

| 26 July 2026 20 | Criciúma | 0–0 | Náutico | Criciúma |
| 16:00 (UTC-3) | | Report | | Stadium: Estádio Heriberto Hülse; Referee: Yuri Elino Ferreira da Cruz |

| 9 August 2026 21 | Náutico | 1–1 | Atlético Goianiense | Recife |
| 16:00 (UTC-3) | Kauan Maranhão 5' | Report | Geovany Soares 55' | Stadium: Estádio Eládio de Barros Carvalho (Aflitos); Attendance: 10.087; Referee: Wagner do Nascimento Magalhães |

| 14 August 2026 22 | Ponte Preta | 1–1 | Náutico | Campinas |
| 19:30 (UTC-3) | Brandão 40' | Report | Borasi 64' | Stadium: Estádio Moisés Lucarelli; Attendance: 1,929; Referee: Julio Cesar Pflege |

| 18 August 2026 23 | Náutico | 1–0 | Ceará | Recife |
| 21:30 (UTC-3) | Léo Índio 45+8' | Report | | Stadium: Estádio Eládio de Barros Carvalho (Aflitos); Attendance: 3,383; Referee: Afro Rocha de Carvalho Filho |

| 23 August 2026 24 | São Bernardo | 1–1 | Náutico | São Bernardo do Campo |
| 16:00 (UTC-3) | Lucas Lima 53' | Report | Derek 85' | Stadium: Estádio 1º de Maio; Attendance: 1,011; Referee: Franciel dos Santos Martins |

| 28 August 2026 25 | Náutico | 2–1 | Athletic | Recife |
| 20:30 (UTC-3) | Derek 71'; Luiz Cláudio 90' | Report | Vera 6' | Stadium: Estádio Eládio de Barros Carvalho (Aflitos); Attendance: 8,182; Referee: Yuri Elino Ferreira da Cruz |

| 3 September 2026 26 | Náutico | 1–0 | Botafogo–SP | Recife |
| 20:00 (UTC-3) | Luiz Cláudio 76' | Report | | Stadium: Estádio Eládio de Barros Carvalho (Aflitos); Attendance: 9,008; Referee: Thaillan Azevedo Gomes |

| 9 September 2026 27 | América Mineiro | 2–1 | Náutico | Belo Horizonte |
| 20:30 (UTC-3) | Willian 15'; Ostchega 25' | Report | Júnior Todinho 88' | Stadium: Estádio Raimundo Sampaio, (Arena Independência); Attendance: 1,003; Referee: Kléber Ariel Gonçalves Silva |

| 15 September 2026 28 | Náutico | 3–3 | Operário Ferroviário | Recife |
| 19:30 (UTC-3) | Vinícius 1'; Jean Carlos 82' (pen.); Danielzinho 87' | Report | Vinícius Diniz 45+1'; Boschilia 90+3'; Cuenú 90+4' | Stadium: Estádio Eládio de Barros Carvalho (Aflitos); Attendance: 6,323; Referee: Matheus de Moraes Silva |

| 21 September 2026 29 | Cuiabá | 3–0 | Náutico | Cuiabá |
| 21:30 (UTC-3) | Lorenzo 32'; Kauan Cristtyan 51', 62' | Report | | Stadium: Arena Pantanal; Attendance: 3,196; Referee: Raimundo Rodrigues de Oliveira Junior |

| 26 September 2026 30 | Náutico | 3–1 | Sport | Recife |
| 16:30 (UTC-3) | Vinícius 45+1'; Jean Carlos 47'; Gustavo Henrique 72' | Report | Neto Pessoa 90+1' | Stadium: Estádio Eládio de Barros Carvalho (Aflitos); Attendance: 10,056; Referee: Daiane Muniz |

| 2 October 2026 31 | Fortaleza | 1–1 | Náutico | Fortaleza |
| 21:35 (UTC-3) | Luiz Fernando 42' | Report | Vinícius 4' | Stadium: Estádio Governador Plácido Castelo (Castelão); Attendance: 14,254; Referee: Kleber Ariel Goncalves Silva |

| 8 October 2026 32 | Náutico | 0–2 | Novorizontino | Recife |
| 19:30 (UTC-3) | | Report | Nicolas Careca 6'; Rômulo 13' (pen.) | Stadium: Estádio Eládio de Barros Carvalho (Aflitos); Attendance: 6,773; Referee: Sávio Pereira Sampaio |

| 11 October 2026 33 | Náutico | 0–2 | Vila Nova | Recife |
| 17:30 (UTC-3) | | Report | Everton Galdino 21'; Janderson 42' | Stadium: Estádio Eládio de Barros Carvalho (Aflitos); Attendance: 5,309; Referee: Fernando Antônio Mendes de Salles Nascimento Filho |

| 19 October 2026 34 | Goiás | 0–0 | Náutico | Goiânia |
| 19:30 (UTC-3) | | Report | | Stadium: Estádio Hailé Pinheiro (Serrinha); Attendance: 5,892; Referee: Yuri Elino Ferreira da Cruz |

| 26 October 2026 35 | Juventude | 4–0 | Náutico | Caxias do Sul |
| 20:30 (UTC-3) | Fábio Lima 6'; Raí 39'; Aderlan 49'; Amarilla 90+5' | Report | | Stadium: Estádio Alfredo Jaconi; Attendance: 11,821; Referee: Bruno Mota Correia |

| 31 October 2026 36 | Náutico | 1–0 | Avaí | Recife |
| 19:30 (UTC-3) | Borasi 23' | Report | | Stadium: Estádio Eládio de Barros Carvalho (Aflitos); Attendance: 10,956; Referee: Afro Rocha De Carvalho Filho |

| 7 November 2026 37 | Náutico | 0–3 | CRB | Recife |
| 21:30 (UTC-3) | | Report | Mikael 34'; Thiaguinho 44'; Danielzinho 61' | Stadium: Estádio Eládio de Barros Carvalho (Aflitos); Attendance: 5,475; Referee: Alex Gomes Stefano |

| 11 November 2026 38 | Londrina | 2–1 | Náutico | Londrina |
| 19:00 (UTC-3) | Guilherme Cachoeira 87'; João Andrade 90' | Report | Halanzinho 80' | Stadium: Estádio Jacy Scaff (do Café); Attendance: 0 Referee: Andreza Helena de Siqueira |
