= Dodô (footballer, born 2001) =

Brazilian footballer

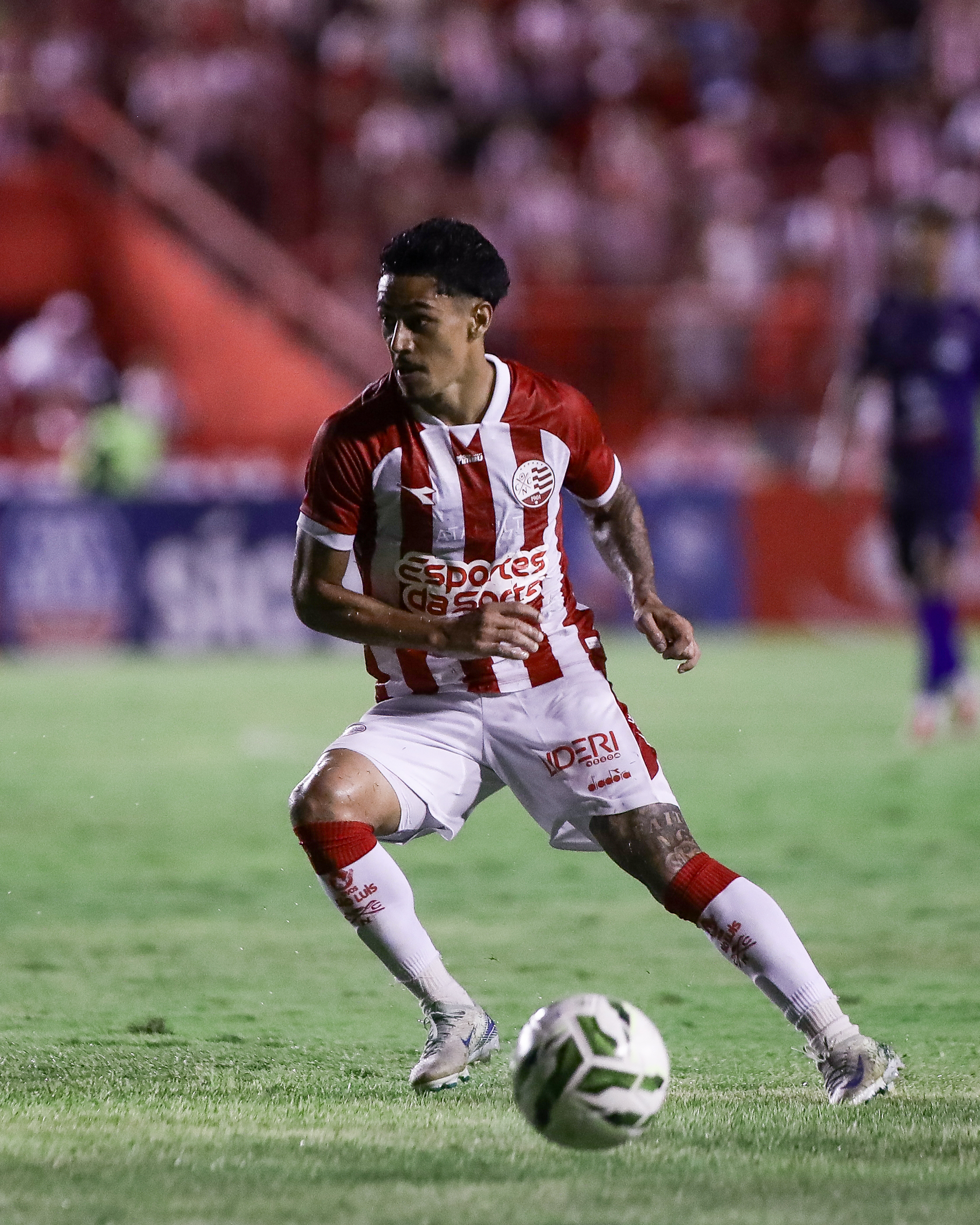
- Dodô playing for Náutico in 2026

Personal information
- Full name: Vinicius Rodrigues Adelino dos Santos
- Date of birth: 15 June 2001 (age 25)
- Place of birth: Angra dos Reis, Brazil
- Height: 1.70 m (5 ft 7 in)
- Position: Midfielder

Team information
- Current team: Náutico (on loan from Coimbra)
- Number: 10

Youth career
- Santos
- Genk
- 2019: Oeste
- 2020–2021: Ferroviária
- 2021: Coimbra

Senior career*
Years	Team	Apps	(Gls)
2021	Ferroviária	0	(0)
2021	→ Barretos (loan)	8	(1)
2022–	Coimbra	7	(0)
2022	→ Villa Nova (loan)	0	(0)
2022	Coimbra B	14	(3)
2023	→ Villa Nova (loan)	12	(4)
2023	→ Goiás (loan)	15	(2)
2024	→ Ponte Preta (loan)	41	(8)
2025	→ Vila Nova (loan)	42	(3)
2026–	→ Náutico (loan)	5	(3)
- * Club domestic league appearances and goals as of 16:12, 2 February 2026 (UTC)

Vinicius Rodrigues Adelino dos Santos (born 15 June 2001), commonly known as Dodô or sometimes as Dodozinho, is a Brazilian footballer who plays as a midfielder for Náutico, on loan from Coimbra.

== Club career ==
Born in Angra dos Reis, Rio de Janeiro, Dodô played for the youth sides of Santos and Belgian club Genk before returning to Brazil and finishing his formation with Oeste and Ferroviária. He made his senior debut on loan to Barretos, playing in the 2021 Campeonato Paulista Série A3.

Dodô subsequently joined Coimbra, but was initially assigned to the under-20 team. He was one of the club's nine players loaned out to Villa Nova for the 2022 Campeonato Mineiro, but did not play.

Back to Coimbra, he played regularly for the main squad in the 2022 Campeonato Mineiro Módulo II, as the club suffered relegation, and with the B-team in the year's Campeonato Mineiro Segunda Divisão, as they finished second. He then returned to Villa Nova for the 2023 Campeonato Mineiro, also on loan.

On 21 April 2023, Dodô was loaned to Série A side Goiás until the end of the year, with a buyout clause. He made his club – and top tier – debut on 7 May, coming on as a late substitute for Julián Palacios in a 5–0 home loss to Palmeiras.

== Career statistics ==
As of 2 February 2026

Club	Season	League			State League		Cup		Continental		Other		Total	
Club	Season	Division	Apps	Goals	Apps	Goals	Apps	Goals	Apps	Goals	Apps	Goals	Apps	Goals
Barretos	2021	Paulista A3	—		8	1	—		—		—		8	1
Villa Nova	2022	Mineiro	—		0	0	—		—		—		0	0
Coimbra	2022	Mineiro Módulo II	—		7	0	—		—		—		7	0
Coimbra B	2022	Mineiro 2ª Divisão	—		14	3	—		—		—		14	3
Villa Nova	2023	Mineiro	—		12	4	—		—		—		12	4
Goiás	2023	Série A	15	2	—		—		—		—		15	2
Ponte Preta	2024	Série B	33	6	8	2	—		—		—		41	8
Vila Nova	2025	Série B	33	3	9	0	1	0	—		1 (Note: Appearance(s) in Copa Verde)	0	44	3
Náutico	2026	Série B	0	0	5	3	0	0	—		—		5	3
Career total			81	11	63	13	1	0	0	0	1	0	146	24
