= Higor Luiz =

Brazilian footballer

Personal information
- Full name: Higor Luiz de Souza
- Date of birth: 27 December 2004 (age 21)
- Place of birth: Piracicaba, Brazil
- Height: 1.78 m (5 ft 10 in)
- Position: Left-back

Team information
- Current team: Vila Nova
- Number: 6

Youth career
- Paraná
- 2021–2023: Desportivo Brasil
- 2023–2025: Vila Nova

Senior career*
Years	Team	Apps	(Gls)
2024–	Vila Nova	60	(0)
2024	→ Iporá (loan)	6	(0)
2024	→ Grêmio Anápolis (loan)	2	(0)
- * Club domestic league appearances and goals as of 21:30, 5 November 2026 (UTC)

Higor Luiz de Souza (born 27 December 2004), known as Higor Luiz or just Higor, is a Brazilian professional footballer who plays as a left-back for Vila Nova.

== Career ==
Born in Piracicaba, São Paulo, Higor represented Paraná and Desportivo Brasil before joining the youth categories of Vila Nova in 2023. On 13 January 2024, he was loaned to Iporá for the Campeonato Goiano.

On 8 March 2024, Higor was announced at Grêmio Anápolis, also on loan. Back to his parent club in August, he made his Série B debut on 24 November, starting in a 2–1 away loss to Paysandu.

Higor started to feature more regularly with Vila during the 2025 season, but only became a starter in the following year.

== Career statistics ==
As of 5 November 2026

Appearances and goals by club, season and competition
Club	Season	League			State league (Note: Includes Campeonato Goiano, Campeonato Goiano Segunda Divisão)		Copa do Brasil		Continental		Other		Total	
Club	Season	Division	Apps	Goals	Apps	Goals	Apps	Goals	Apps	Goals	Apps	Goals	Apps	Goals
Vila Nova	2022	Série B	1	0	—		—		—		—		1	0
Vila Nova	2025	Série B	17	0	5	0	1	0	—		3 (Note: Appearance(s) in Copa Verde)	0	26	0
Vila Nova	2026	Série B	30	0	7	0	3	0	—		2 (Note: Appearance(s) in Copa Centro-Oeste)	0	42	0
Vila Nova	Total		48	0	12	0	4	0	—		5	0	69	0
Iporá (loan)	2024	Série D	—		6	0	—		—		—		6	0
Grêmio Anápolis (loan)	2024	Goiano 2ª Divisão	—		2	0	—		—		—		2	0
Career total			48	0	20	0	4	0	0	0	5	0	77	0
