= Rafael Rech =

Brazilian footballer (born 2002)

Rafinha
Personal information
- Full name: Rafael Pasquali Rech
- Date of birth: 18 November 2002 (age 23)
- Place of birth: Brisbane, Australia
- Height: 1.73 m (5 ft 8 in)
- Position: Forward

Team information
- Current team: Chapecoense (on loan from Juventude)

Youth career
- 2013–2020: Juventude
- 2020–2022: São Paulo

Senior career*
Years	Team	Apps	(Gls)
2022–	Juventude	17	(0)
2024	→ Marcílio Dias (loan)	13	(2)
2024	→ Chapecoense (loan)	1	(0)
- * Club domestic league appearances and goals as of 17 July 2024

Rafael Pasquali Rech (born 18 November 2002), commonly known as Rafinha, is an Australian-born professional footballer who plays as a forward for Juventude.

== Personal life ==
Rafinha was born in Brisbane, Australia in 2002 while his father, Fernando was playing for the Brisbane Strikers in the National Soccer League. He left Australia for Brazil at the age of two.

== Career ==
After playing the 2020 Copa São Paulo de Futebol Júnior with Juventude at the age of 17, Rafinha was transferred to São Paulo, as a part of the deal which involved the loan of Gabriel Novaes in the opposite direction. After struggling with a knee injury, he returned to Juventude in 2022.

Rafinha made his first team – and Série A – debut for Juventude on 29 August 2022, coming on as a late substitute for Jadson in a 4–0 away loss against Internacional. On 7 October, he renewed his contract until October 2025.
