= Luan Ribeiro =

Brazilian footballer (born 1997)

Personal information
- Full name: Luan Fernandes Ribeiro
- Date of birth: 10 June 1997 (age 29)
- Place of birth: Campinas, Brazil
- Height: 1.90 m (6 ft 3 in)
- Position: Goalkeeper

Team information
- Current team: Londrina
- Number: 1

Youth career
- 2012: Guarani
- 2013–2017: Corinthians

Senior career*
| Years | Team | Apps | (Gls) |
| 2018 | Bragantino | 1 | (0) |
| 2019–2024 | Ponte Preta | 10 | (0) |
| 2025 | Água Santa | 15 | (0) |
| 2025– | Londrina | 8 | (0) |
- * Club domestic league appearances and goals as of 18 November 2026

Luan Fernandes Ribeiro (born 10 June 1997), known as Luan Ribeiro or just Luan, is a Brazilian footballer who plays as a goalkeeper for Londrina.

== Career ==
Born in Campinas, São Paulo, Luan joined Corinthians' youth sides in 2013, from hometown club Guarani. He left the former in December 2017, after finishing his formation, and signed for Bragantino on 21 February 2018.

Luan made his senior debut on 11 August 2018, starting in a 2–1 Série C home win over Cuiabá. It was his only appearance for the side, as he served as a backup option to Alex Alves before joining Ponte Preta in 2019, initially for the under-23 squad.

Promoted to the first team ahead of the 2020 season, Luan was initially a fourth-choice behind Ivan, Ygor Vinhas and Guilherme, and only made his club debut on 27 February 2021, starting in a 1–1 Campeonato Paulista away draw against Novorizontino as Ivan was sidelined due to an injured and both Vinhas and Guilherme were out with a cold. He became a third-choice behind Caíque França and Pedro Rocha during the 2023 campaign, before signing a new one-year contract on 17 January 2024.

On 19 December 2024, Luan left Ponte and signed for Água Santa.

== Career statistics ==
As of 19 February 2025.

| Club | Season | League | | | State League | | Cup | | Continental | | Other | | Total | |
| Club | Season | Division | Apps | Goals | Apps | Goals | Apps | Goals | Apps | Goals | Apps | Goals | Apps | Goals |
|---|---|---|---|---|---|---|---|---|---|---|---|---|---|---|
| Bragantino | 2018 | Série C | 1 | 0 | 0 | 0 | 0 | 0 | — | | — | | 1 | 0 |
| Bragantino | 2019 | Série B | 0 | 0 | 0 | 0 | — | | — | | — | | 0 | 0 |
| Bragantino | Total | | 0 | 0 | 0 | 0 | 0 | 0 | — | | — | | 1 | 0 |
| Ponte Preta | 2019 | Série B | 0 | 0 | 0 | 0 | 0 | 0 | — | | 4 (Note: Appearance(s) in Copa Paulista) | 0 | 4 | 0 |
| Ponte Preta | 2020 | Série B | 0 | 0 | 0 | 0 | 0 | 0 | — | | — | | 0 | 0 |
| Ponte Preta | 2021 | Série B | 0 | 0 | 3 | 0 | 0 | 0 | — | | — | | 3 | 0 |
| Ponte Preta | 2022 | Série B | 2 | 0 | 0 | 0 | 0 | 0 | — | | — | | 2 | 0 |
| Ponte Preta | 2023 | Série B | 0 | 0 | 0 | 0 | 0 | 0 | — | | — | | 0 | 0 |
| Ponte Preta | 2024 | Série B | 5 | 0 | 0 | 0 | — | | — | | — | | 5 | 0 |
| Ponte Preta | Total | | 7 | 0 | 3 | 0 | 0 | 0 | — | | 4 | 0 | 14 | 0 |
| Água Santa | 2025 | Série D | 0 | 0 | 3 | 0 | — | | — | | — | | 3 | 0 |
| Career total | | | 8 | 0 | 6 | 0 | 0 | 0 | 0 | 0 | 4 | 0 | 18 | 0 |

== Honours ==
Ponte Preta

- Campeonato Paulista Série A2: 2023
