= Wenderson =

Wenderson may refer to:

- Wender (footballer) (Wenderson de Arruda Said, born 1975), Brazilian footballer
- Wenderson Tsunami (born 1996), Brazilian footballer
- Wenderson (footballer, born 1998), Brazilian footballer
- Wenderson (footballer, born 1999), Brazilian footballer
