= Ramon (footballer, born 1997) =

Brazilian footballer

Personal information
- Full name: Ramon Rodrigo de Carvalho
- Date of birth: 19 May 1997 (age 29)
- Place of birth: Limeira, Brazil
- Height: 1.74 m (5 ft 9 in)
- Position: Defensive midfielder

Team information
- Current team: Náutico
- Number: 40

Youth career
- 2012–2016: Desportivo Brasil
- 2015: → Palmeiras (loan)
- 2016: → Internacional (loan)
- 2017: Internacional

Senior career*
Years	Team	Apps	(Gls)
2015–2016	Desportivo Brasil	10	(1)
2017–2021	Internacional	0	(0)
2019	→ Vila Nova (loan)	36	(2)
2020–2021	→ Bahia (loan)	19	(2)
2021	→ América Mineiro (loan)	15	(1)
2022–2023	Atlético Goianiense	8	(0)
2022–2023	→ Ponte Preta (loan)	46	(1)
2024	Ponte Preta	35	(1)
2025	Inter de Limeira	4	(0)
2025	Ituano	15	(1)
2026–	Náutico	5	(0)
- * Club domestic league appearances and goals as of 30 January 2026

Ramon Rodrigo de Carvalho (born 19 May 1997), simply known as Ramon, is a Brazilian footballer who plays as a defensive midfielder for Náutico.

== Club career ==
Born in Limeira, São Paulo, Ramon started his career with Desportivo Brasil. He made his first team debut on 26 April 2015, playing the last 27 minutes in a 1–0 Campeonato Paulista Segunda Divisão away win against Inter de Bebedouro. He scored his first goal on 30 May, netting the opener through a penalty kick in a 1–1 home draw against Olé Brasil.

In 2016, after a short period on loan at Palmeiras, Ramon joined Internacional also in a temporary deal. Bought outright by the latter club for the 2017 season, he subsequently featured regularly for the B-team.

On 29 March 2019, Ramon was loaned to Série B side Vila Nova until the end of the season. He became a regular starter for the side, contributing with two goals in 40 appearances overall but suffering team relegation.

In November 2019, Ramon renewed his contract with Inter and moved to fellow Série A side Bahia on loan, with a buyout clause. Initially assigned to the under-23 squad for the 2020 Campeonato Baiano, he was definitely promoted to the main squad shortly after, and made his top tier debut on 27 September 2020 by coming on as a late substitute for Ronaldo in a 0–1 away loss against Athletico Paranaense.

On 12 April 2021, Ramon terminated his loan with Bahia and joined fellow top-tier side América Mineiro, also in a temporary deal.

== Career statistics ==
As of 24 February 2025

Club	Season	League			State League		Cup		Continental		Other		Total	
Club	Season	Division	Apps	Goals	Apps	Goals	Apps	Goals	Apps	Goals	Apps	Goals	Apps	Goals
Desportivo Brasil	2015	Paulista 2ª Divisão	—		10	1	—		—		—		10	1
Internacional	2017	Série B	0	0	—		0	0	—		7 (Note: Appearance(s) in Copa FGF)	0	7	0
Internacional	2018	Série A	0	0	—		0	0	—		5	3	5	3
Internacional	Total		0	0	—		0	0	—		12	3	12	3
Vila Nova (loan)	2019	Série B	36	2	—		4	0	—		—		40	2
Bahia (loan)	2020	Série A	13	0	6	2	0	0	4 (Note: Appearance(s) in Copa Sudamericana)	0	—		23	2
Bahia (loan)	2021	Série A	0	0	0	0	0	0	0	0	4 (Note: Appearance(s) in Copa do Nordeste)	0	4	0
Bahia (loan)	Total		13	0	6	2	0	0	4	0	4	0	27	2
América Mineiro (loan)	2021	Série A	10	0	5	1	2	0	—		—		17	1
Atlético Goianiense	2022	Série A	0	0	8	0	1	0	0	0	—		9	0
Ponte Preta	2022	Série B	11	0	—		—		—		—		11	0
Ponte Preta	2023	Série B	25	0	10	1	—		—		—		35	1
Ponte Preta	2024	Série B	22	1	13	0	—		—		—		35	1
Ponte Preta	Total		58	1	23	1	—		—		—		81	2
Inter de Limeira	2025	Série D	0	0	4	0	—		—		—		4	0
Career total			117	3	56	5	7	0	4	0	16	3	200	11

== Honours ==
Bahia

- Campeonato Baiano: 2020

Atlético Goianiense

- Campeonato Goiano: 2022
