= Juninho (footballer, born September 1995) =

Brazilian footballer

Personal information
- Full name: Eduardo José Barbosa da Silva Júnior
- Date of birth: 3 September 1995 (age 31)
- Place of birth: Rio das Pedras, Brazil
- Height: 1.75 m (5 ft 9 in)
- Position: Attacking midfielder

Team information
- Current team: Ferroviária
- Number: 77

Youth career
- 2011–2013: Palmeiras

Senior career*
Years	Team	Apps	(Gls)
2013	Palmeiras B		
2013–2018	Palmeiras	2	(0)
2016	→ Audax (loan)		
2016	→ Criciúma (loan)	21	(1)
2017	→ Ferroviária (loan)		
2017	→ Guarani (loan)	19	(0)
2018	→ Ituano (loan)		
2018	→ Vila Nova (loan)	15	(1)
2019	Figueirense	7	(0)
2019–2020	Mirassol	10	(1)
2020	→ Paysandu (loan)	19	(0)
2021	Paraná	2	(0)
2021–2022	PSS Sleman	18	(6)
2022–2023	Marcílio Dias	11	(1)
2023–2024	Inter de Limeira	17	(5)
2024–2025	Ferroviária	57	(13)
2026	Náutico	12	(1)
2026–	Ferroviária	13	(2)
- * Club domestic league appearances and goals as of 9 November 2026

Eduardo José Barbosa da Silva Júnior (born 3 September 1995), known as Juninho, is a Brazilian footballer who plays as an attacking midfielder for Brazilian club Ferroviária.

== Career statistics ==
As of 8 February 2018

Club	Season	League			State League		Cup		Continental		Other		Total	
Club	Season	Division	Apps	Goals	Apps	Goals	Apps	Goals	Apps	Goals	Apps	Goals	Apps	Goals
Palmeiras B	2013	Paulista A3	—		3	1	—		—		—		3	1
Palmeiras	2014	Série A	1	0	—		0	0	—		—		1	0
Palmeiras	2015	Série A	2	0	—		1	0	—		—		3	0
Palmeiras	Subtotal		3	0	—		1	0	—		—		4	0
Audax	2016	Série D	—		14	2	—		—		—		14	2
Criciúma	2016	Série B	21	1	—		—		—		—		21	1
Ferroviária	2017	Paulista	—		14	2	1	0	—		—		15	2
Guarani	2017	Série B	19	0	—		—		—		—		19	0
Ituano	2018	Paulista	—		3	0	1	0	—		—		4	0
Career total			43	1	34	5	3	0	0	0	0	0	80	6
