= Matheus Régis =

Brazilian footballer

Personal information
- Full name: Wellison Matheus Rodrigues Régis
- Date of birth: 11 August 1999 (age 27)
- Place of birth: Ingá, Brazil
- Height: 1.81 m (5 ft 11 in)
- Position: Forward

Team information
- Current team: Volta Redonda
- Number: 14

Youth career
- Botafogo-PB
- 2018: Desportiva Guarabira
- 2019: Botafogo-PB

Senior career*
Years	Team	Apps	(Gls)
2018	Desportiva Guarabira	4	(0)
2020	CSP	8	(3)
2020	Treze	2	(0)
2020–2022	Campinense	36	(7)
2022	CSE	11	(4)
2023–2025	São Bernardo	24	(6)
2023	→ Atlético Goianiense (loan)	12	(1)
2024	→ Ponte Preta (loan)	30	(2)
2025	→ Guarani (loan)	5	(1)
2025	→ Botafogo-SP (loan)	19	(0)
2026	Santa Cruz	5	(0)
2026	América-RN	13	(4)
2026–	Volta Redonda	3	(0)
- * Club domestic league appearances and goals as of 11 November 2026

Wellison Matheus Rodrigues Régis (born 11 August 1999), known as Matheus Régis, is a Brazilian professional footballer who plays as a forward for Volta Redonda.

== Career ==
Born in Ingá, Paraíba, Régis made his senior debut with Desportiva Guarabira in 2018. After a year with the under-20 side of Botafogo-PB, he moved to CSP for the 2020 season.

On 8 September 2020, Régis signed for Série C side Treze, but was released after two matches and joined Campinense on 28 October.

Régis was a regular starter for Campinense during the 2021 season, as the club achieved promotion from the Série D, but left for CSE in April 2022. On 30 November of that year, he was announced at São Bernardo for the upcoming campaign.

On 17 April 2023, Régis was loaned to Série B team Atlético Goianiense for the remainder of the year. In June, however, he suffered a knee injury, only returning to action in the following month.

== Career statistics ==
As of 5 September 2024

Club	Season	League			State League		National Cup		Continental		Other		Total	
Club	Season	Division	Apps	Goals	Apps	Goals	Apps	Goals	Apps	Goals	Apps	Goals	Apps	Goals
Desportiva Guarabira	2018	Paraibano 2ª Divisão	—		4	0	—		—		—		4	0
CSP	2020	Paraibano	—		8	3	—		—		—		8	3
Treze	2020	Série C	2	0	—		—		—		—		2	0
Campinense	2020	Série D	5	2	—		—		—		—		5	2
Campinense	2021	Série D	17	4	11	1	1	0	—		—		29	5
Campinense	2022	Série C	0	0	3	0	1	0	—		6 (Note: Appearance(s) in Copa do Nordeste)	0	10	0
Campinense	Total		22	6	14	1	2	0	—		6	0	44	7
CSE	2022	Série D	11	4	—		—		—		—		11	4
São Bernardo	2023	Série C	0	0	12	3	1	0	—		—		13	3
São Bernardo	2024	Série C	0	0	12	3	2	0	—		—		14	3
São Bernardo	Total		0	0	24	6	3	0	—		—		27	6
Atlético Goianiense (loan)	2023	Série B	12	1	—		—		—		—		12	1
Ponte Preta (loan)	2024	Série B	21	2	—		—		—		—		21	2
Career total			68	13	50	10	5	0	0	0	6	0	129	23

== Honours ==
Campinense

- Campeonato Paraibano: 2021, 2022
