= Sérgio Raphael =

Brazilian footballer (born 1995)

Personal information
- Full name: Sérgio Raphael dos Anjos
- Date of birth: 23 October 1992 (age 34)
- Place of birth: Rio de Janeiro, Brazil
- Height: 1.88 m (6 ft 2 in)
- Position: Centre-back

Team information
- Current team: Ponte Preta
- Number: 6

Youth career
- Vasco da Gama
- 2009–2010: America-RJ
- 2010–2011: Marítimo

Senior career*
Years	Team	Apps	(Gls)
2011	Canas Senhorim	5	(0)
2012–2013	Duque de Caxias	29	(0)
2014	Bahia	0	(0)
2014–2017	Bangu	13	(2)
2015	→ CRB (loan)	1	(0)
2016	→ Tigres do Brasil (loan)	8	(0)
2016	→ Macaé (loan)	5	(0)
2016–2017	→ Ħamrun Spartans (loan)	27	(0)
2018	Juventus-SP	13	(0)
2018–2019	Al-Ain		
2019	Oriente Petrolero	5	(0)
2019–2021	Sirens	33	(0)
2021–2022	Hibernians	24	(1)
2022	Naft Al-Basra		
2023	Al-Merrikh		
2024	Nova Iguaçu	14	(0)
2024–	Ponte Preta	17	(1)
- * Club domestic league appearances and goals as of 21:19, 5 September 2024 (UTC)

Sérgio Raphael dos Anjos (born 23 October 1992), known as Sérgio Raphael, is a Brazilian footballer who plays as a centre-back for Ponte Preta.

== Career ==
Born in Rio de Janeiro, Sérgio Raphael began his career as a forward, but soon moved into a centre-back position. After making his senior debut with Portuguese Terceira Divisão side Canas Senhorim in 2011, he returned to his home country with Duque de Caxias in the following year.

On 6 January 2014, Sérgio Raphael agreed to a deal with Bahia, but left on 16 January after a "consensus" over his contract was not reached. After having his permanence confirmed the following day, he still left the club on 24 January, before returning on 20 February after accepting the new conditions of the club.

In September 2014, after making no appearances for Bahia, Sérgio Raphael moved to Bangu. He subsequently served loans at CRB, Tigres do Brasil, Macaé and Maltese side Ħamrun Spartans, before returning to his parent club on 12 May 2017.

In December 2017, Sérgio Raphael was announced in the squad of Juventus-SP for the upcoming season. On 31 January 2019, after a short spell at Saudi club Al-Ain, he signed for Oriente Petrolero in Bolivia, but rescinded his deal with the club on 7 May.

On 23 August 2019, Sérgio Raphael returned to Malta and joined Sirens. He moved to fellow league team Hibernians on 21 January 2021, and won the 2021–22 Maltese Premier League with the club.

In 2022, Sérgio Raphael switched teams and countries again, after agreeing to a deal with Naft Al-Basra in Iraq. He moved to Sudanese side Al-Merrikh on 19 January of the following year, but left the country in April amidst the Sudanese civil war.

After spending a period without a club and working as a model, Sérgio Raphael signed for Nova Iguaçu on 18 December 2023. He was an undisputed starter as the club reached the 2024 Campeonato Carioca finals for the first time ever.

On 11 April 2024, Sérgio Raphael was presented at Série B side Ponte Preta.

== Career statistics ==
As of 23 February 2024.

Club	Season	League			State League		Cup		Continental		Other		Total	
Club	Season	Division	Apps	Goals	Apps	Goals	Apps	Goals	Apps	Goals	Apps	Goals	Apps	Goals
Canas Senhorim	2011–12	Terceira Divisão	5	0	—		—		—		—		5	0
Duque de Caxias	2012	Série C	5	0	—		—		—		2 (Note: Appearance(s) in Copa Rio)	0	7	0
Duque de Caxias	2013	Série C	9	0	15	0	—		—		9	0	33	0
Duque de Caxias	Total		14	0	15	0	—		—		11	0	40	0
Bangu	2014	Carioca	—		—		—		—		8	0	8	0
Bangu	2015	Carioca	—		13	2	—		—		—		13	2
Bangu	2017	Série D	0	0	—		—		—		3	0	3	0
Bangu	Total		0	0	13	2	—		—		11	0	24	2
CRB (loan)	2015	Série B	1	0	—		—		—		—		1	0
Tigres do Brasil (loan)	2016	Carioca	—		8	0	—		—		—		8	0
Macaé (loan)	2016	Série C	5	0	—		—		—		—		5	0
Ħamrun Spartans (loan)	2016–17	Maltese Premier League	27	0	—		2	0	—		—		29	0
Juventus-SP	2018	Paulista A2	—		13	0	—		—		—		13	0
Oriente Petrolero	2019	Bolivian Primera División	5	0	—		—		2 (Note: Appearance(s) in Copa Sudamericana)	0	—		7	0
Sirens	2019–20	Maltese Premier League	19	0	—		1	1	—		—		20	1
Sirens	2020–21	Maltese Premier League	14	0	—		0	0	1 (Note: Appearance(s) in UEFA Europa League)	0	—		15	0
Sirens	Total		33	0	—		1	1	1	0	—		35	1
Hibernians	2020–21	Maltese Premier League	7	0	—		2	0	—		—		9	0
Hibernians	2021–22	Maltese Premier League	17	1	—		2	0	4 (Note: One appearance in UEFA Champions League, three appearances in UEFA Conference League)	0	—		23	1
Hibernians	Total		24	1	—		4	0	4	0	—		32	1
Nova Iguaçu	2024	Série D	0	0	14	0	2	0	—		—		16	0
Ponte Preta	2024	Série B	17	1	—		—		—		—		17	1
Career total			131	2	63	2	9	1	7	0	22	6	232	5

== Honours ==
Duque de Caxias

- Copa Rio: 2013

Hibernians

- Maltese Premier League: 2021–22
