= Iago Dias =

Brazilian footballer (born 1993)

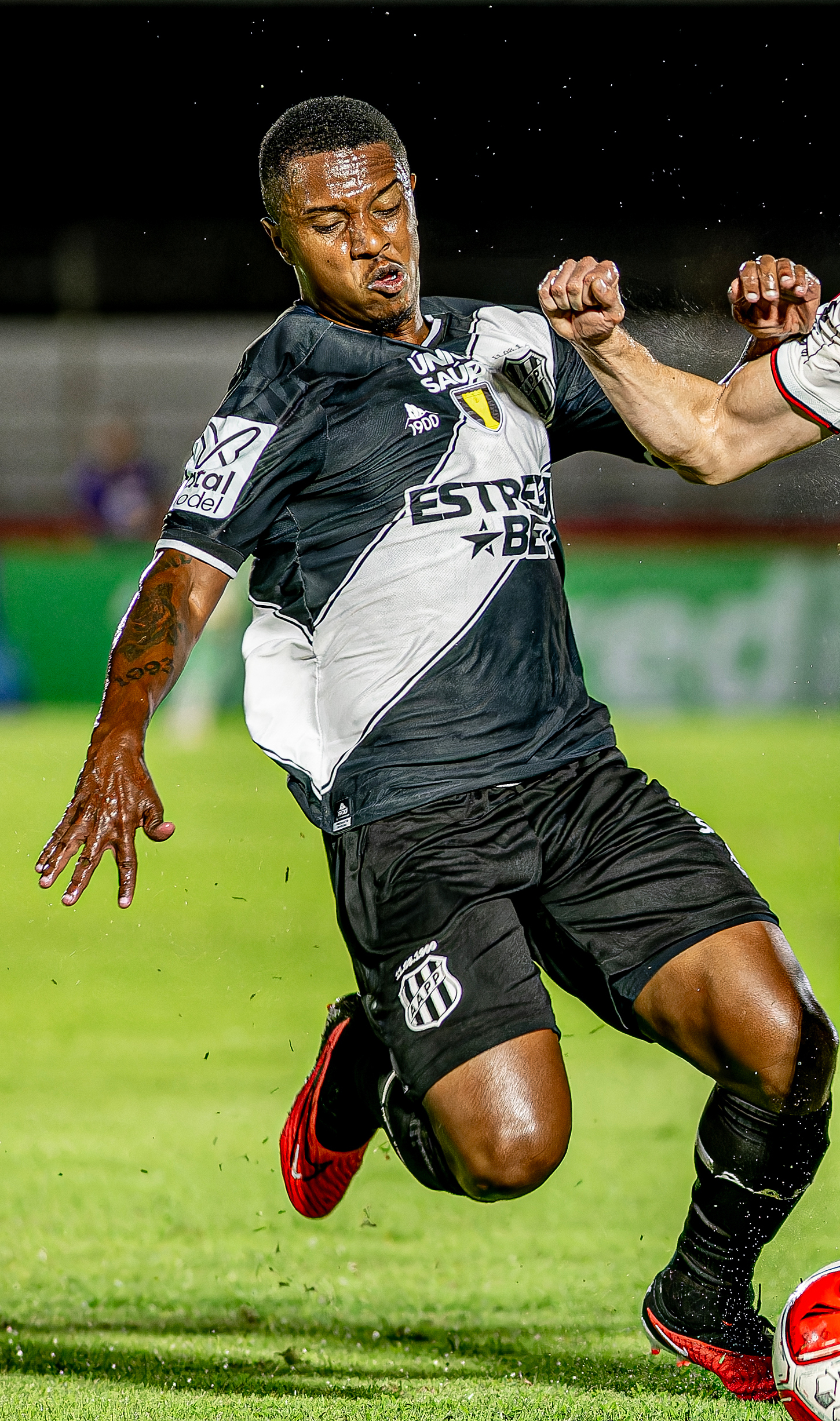
- Iago Dias playing for Ponte Preta in 2024

Personal information
- Full name: Iago Ângelo Dias
- Date of birth: 6 April 1993 (age 33)
- Place of birth: São João Nepomuceno, Brazil
- Height: 1.75 m (5 ft 9 in)
- Position: Forward

Team information
- Current team: Ponte Preta

Youth career
- 2011–2012: Palmeiras
- 2012–2013: Atibaia

Senior career*
Years	Team	Apps	(Gls)
2014–2015	Grêmio Barueri	31	(2)
2016	Atibaia	22	(6)
2016	→ Coritiba (loan)	24	(2)
2017–2021	Coritiba	60	(4)
2020	→ Juventude (loan)	3	(0)
2020–2021	→ CRB (loan)	17	(2)
2021	Ituano	12	(2)
2021–2022	Náutico	14	(1)
2022	Pouso Alegre	33	(7)
2022–2023	São Bento	7	(0)
2023	Londrina	30	(4)
2024–	Ponte Preta	40	(5)
2025	→ Portuguesa (loan)	14	(0)
- * Club domestic league appearances and goals as of 20:38, 5 August 2025 (UTC)

Iago Ângelo Dias (born 6 April 1993), known as Iago or Iago Dias is a Brazilian footballer who plays as a forward for Ponte Preta.

== Club career ==
Born in São João Nepomuceno, Minas Gerais, Iago Dias represented Palmeiras as a youth before moving to Atibaia in 2012. In 2014, he moved to Grêmio Barueri, and made his senior debut on 20 February of that year by coming on as a late substitute in a 0–1 Campeonato Paulista Série A2 away loss against Batatais.

On 21 December 2015 Iago Dias returned to his former club Atibaia. He was an undisputed starter for the club during the Campeonato Paulista Série A3 championship, scoring six goals in 22 matches as his side reached the latter stages of the tournament.

On 22 June 2016, Iago Dias signed a one-year loan deal with Série A side Coritiba, after impressing on a trial period. He made his debut in the tournament a day later, replacing Walisson Maia in a 1–1 home draw against Internacional.

Iago Dias scored his first professional goal on 21 August 2016, netting the winner in a 2–1 home win against Santos. Ten days later, he scored the game's only in a home success over Vitória, taking Coxa to the following round of the year's Copa Sudamericana.

On 19 December 2016, Coritiba bought 50% of Iago Dias' federative rights, and the player signed a contract until 2020. He subsequently lost his starting spot, and served loan stints at Juventude and CRB before the expiration of his contract.

Iago Dias rarely settled for a club in the following years, representing Ituano, Náutico, Pouso Alegre, São Bento, Londrina, Ponte Preta and Portuguesa; he suffered three consecutive relegations with São Bento, Londrina and Ponte.

== Career statistics ==
As of 5 August 2025

Appearances and goals by club, season and competition
Club	Season	League			State league (Note: Includes Campeonato Paulista Série A2, Campeonato Paulista Série A3, Campeonato Paranaense, Campeonato Gaúcho, Campeonato Paulista, Campeonato Mineiro)		National cup		Continental		Other		Total	
Club	Season	Division	Apps	Goals	Apps	Goals	Apps	Goals	Apps	Goals	Apps	Goals	Apps	Goals
Grêmio Barueri	2014	Série D	6	1	12	0	4	1	—		—		22	2
Grêmio Barueri	2015	Paulista A3	—		13	1	—		—		8 (Note: Appearance(s) in Copa Paulista)	2	21	3
Grêmio Barueri	Total		6	1	25	1	4	1	—		8	2	43	5
Atibaia	2016	Paulista A3	—		22	6	—		—		—		22	6
Coritiba (loan)	2016	Série A	24	2	—		—		6 (Note: Appearance(s) in Copa Sudamericana)	3	—		30	5
Coritiba	2017	Série A	17	0	15	2	1	0	—		—		33	2
Coritiba	2018	Série B	9	0	10	0	4	0	—		—		23	0
Coritiba	2019	Série B	1	0	8	2	1	1	—		—		10	3
Coritiba	2020	Série A	—		0	0	—		—		—		0	0
Coritiba	Total		27	0	33	4	6	1	—		—		66	5
Juventude (loan)	2020	Série B	—		3	0	2	1	—		—		5	1
CRB (loan)	2020	Série B	17	2	—		0	0	—		0	0	17	2
Ituano	2021	Série C	—		12	2	—		—		—		12	2
Náutico	2021	Série B	14	1	—		—		—		0	0	14	1
Pouso Alegre	2022	Série D	23	5	10	2	2	0	—		—		35	7
São Bento	2023	Paulista	—		7	0	—		—		—		7	0
Londrina	2023	Série B	30	4	—		—		—		—		30	4
Ponte Preta	2024	Série B	31	2	9	3	—		—		—		40	5
Portuguesa (loan)	2025	Série D	11	0	3	0	0	0	—		—		14	0
Career Total			183	17	124	18	14	3	6	3	8	2	335	43
