= Élvis (footballer, born 1990) =

Brazilian footballer

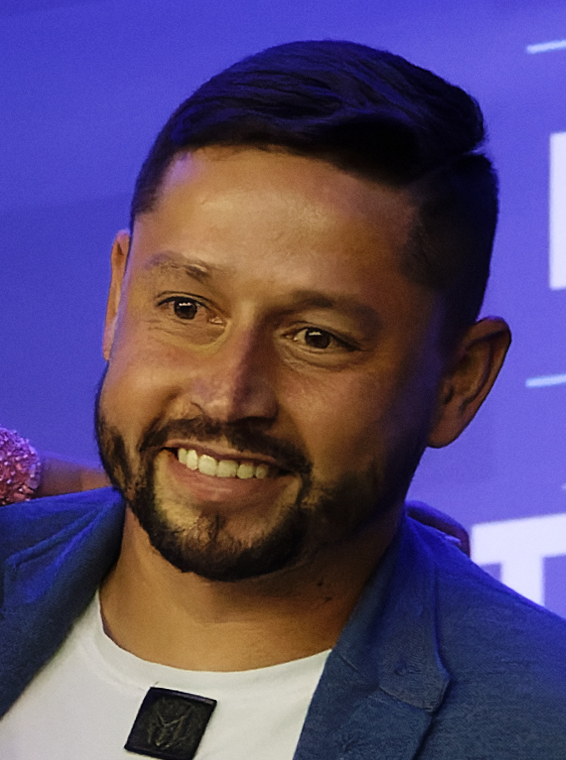
- Elvis in 2023

Personal information
- Full name: Élvis Vieira Araújo
- Date of birth: 9 September 1990 (age 36)
- Place of birth: Janiópolis, Brazil
- Height: 1.75 m (5 ft 9 in)
- Position: Attacking midfielder

Team information
- Current team: Ponte Preta

Youth career
- 2004–2010: Paraná
- 2010: → Botafogo (loan)

Senior career*
Years	Team	Apps	(Gls)
2009–2010	Paraná	31	(1)
2011–2013	Benfica	0	(0)
2011	→ Atlético Goianiense (loan)	8	(0)
2011–2012	→ União Leiria (loan)	24	(1)
2012–2013	Benfica B	5	(0)
2013–2014	Tombense	13	(4)
2013–2014	→ América Mineiro (loan)	19	(1)
2015−2016	Botafogo	26	(2)
2016	Criciúma	35	(11)
2016	Figueirense	11	(0)
2017	Red Bull Brasil	8	(0)
2017	CRB	22	(2)
2018	Criciúma	47	(6)
2019	Oeste	48	(5)
2020–2021	Cuiabá	45	(5)
2021–2022	Goiás	62	(10)
2022–	Ponte Preta	135	(18)
- * Club domestic league appearances and goals as of 18 November 2026

Élvis Vieira Araújo (born 9 September 1990) is a Brazilian footballer who plays as an attacking midfielder for Ponte Preta.

== Club career ==
Born in Janiópolis, Paraná, Élvis started his career at Paraná Clube. He made his first team debut on 27 January 2009, coming on as a substitute for Kleber in a 1–1 Campeonato Paranaense home draw against Paranavaí.

Élvis became a starter for the Tricolor during the 2010 Paranaense, and scored his first senior goal on 21 January of that year, netting the second of a 4–0 away routing of Engenheiro Beltrão. On 27 April, he moved to Botafogo on loan, but was assigned to the under-20 squad.

Élvis was signed by Benfica on 12 January 2011, on a three-and-a-half-year contract. On 17 February, he moved to Atlético Goianiense on loan. At the latter club, he made his Série A debut on 26 June by playing the last 13 minutes of a 0–1 home loss against Vasco da Gama.

On 20 July 2011, Élvis joined União Leiria in Primeira Liga on a year-long loan deal. In a good individual year, he played 27 games and scored twice, but as the club was facing a severe economic crisis, he terminated his loan contract for unpaid salaries on 28 April 2012.

For the following seasons, Élvis was assigned to the reactivated Benfica B, making his debut in a 6–0 win against of Belenenses on 27 August 2012. After featuring rarely, he terminated his link and signed with Tombense in the Série D.

At Tombense, Élvis was first loaned to América Mineiro in 2013, but returned to Tombense the following year to help the team win their first-ever promotion to the Série C. His performances led to a move to Botafogo in 2015, winning the Taça Guanabara at Fogão.

On 6 January 2016, still owned by Tombense, Élvis signed with Criciúma. He finished 2016 at Figueirense, and joined Red Bull Brasil on a four-month contract for the 2017 season.

In April 2017, Élvis signed with CRB in the second tier. The following 2 January, he returned to Criciúma.

Élvis played the 2019 campaign at Oeste, being a regular starter as his side narrowly avoided relegation. On 26 December of that year, he agreed to a contract with Cuiabá.

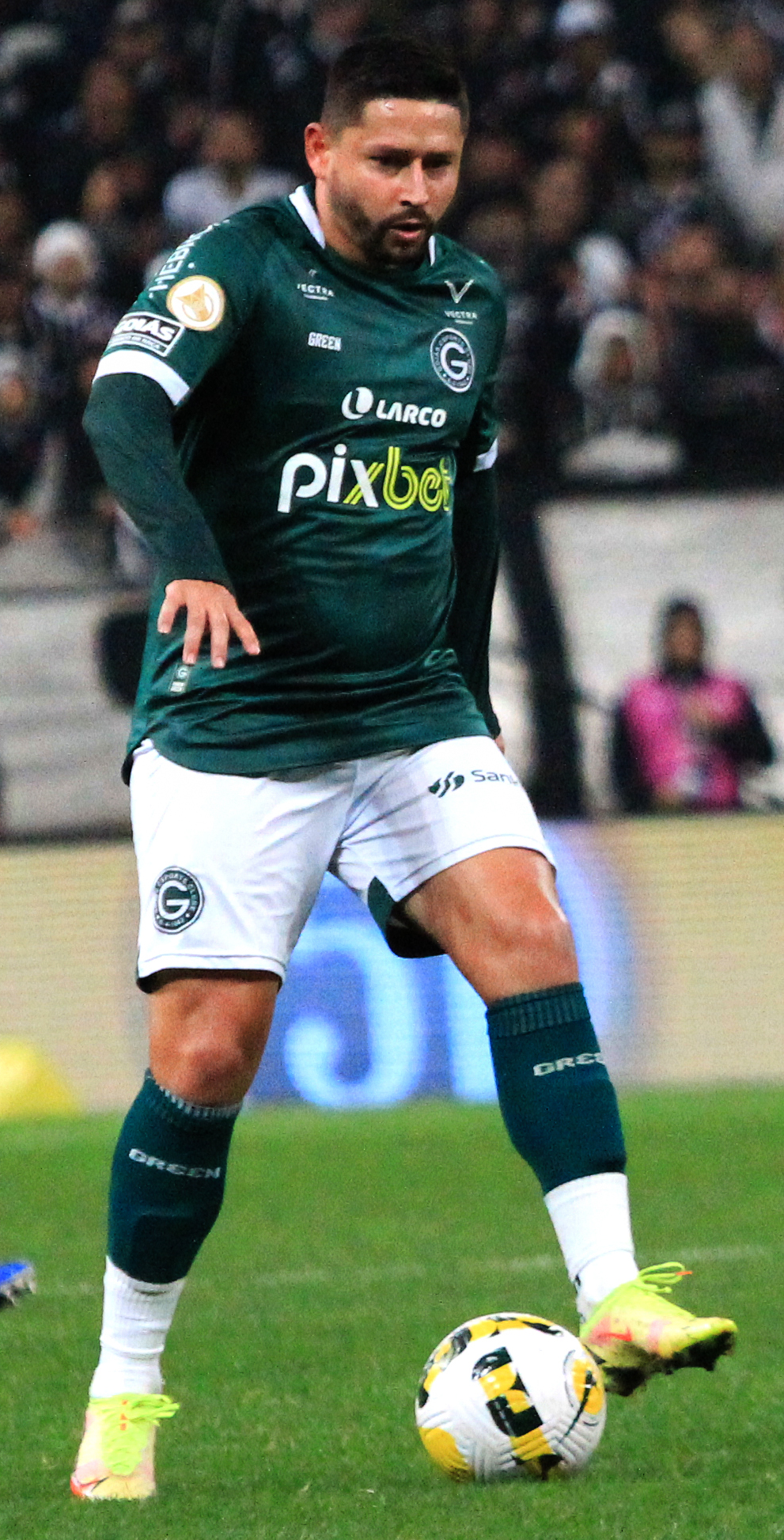
Élvis playing for Goiás in 2022

On 16 April 2021, after helping Cuiabá to a first-ever promotion to the top tier, Élvis signed a two-year contract with Goiás, as the club paid his R$ 200,000 release clause. He also helped his new side on another top tier promotion in his first season.

== Career statistics ==
As of 6 July 2022

Club	Season	League			State League		Cup		Continental		Other		Total	
Club	Season	Division	Apps	Goals	Apps	Goals	Apps	Goals	Apps	Goals	Apps	Goals	Apps	Goals
Paraná	2009	Série B	9	0	4	0	0	0	—		—		13	0
Paraná	2010	Série B	1	0	17	1	1	0	—		—		19	1
Paraná	Subtotal		10	0	21	1	1	0	—		—		32	1
Atlético Goianiense	2011	Série A	2	0	6	0	2	0	—		—		10	0
União Leiria	2011–12	Primeira Liga	24	1	—		1	0	—		2 (Note: Appearance(s) in Taça da Liga)	1	27	2
Benfica B	2012–13	Segunda Liga	5	0	—		—		—		—		5	0
América Mineiro	2013	Série B	11	1	—		—		—		—		11	1
América Mineiro	2014	Série B	0	0	8	0	1	1	—		—		9	1
América Mineiro	Subtotal		11	1	8	0	1	1	—		—		20	2
Tombense	2014	Série D	13	4	—		—		—		—		13	4
Botafogo	2015	Série B	21	1	5	1	4	0	—		—		30	2
Criciúma	2016	Série B	17	2	18	9	2	1	—		1 (Note: Appearance(s) in Primeira Liga (Brazil))	0	38	12
Figueirense	2016	Série A	11	0	—		—		1 (Note: Appearance(s) in Copa Sudamericana)	0	—		12	0
Red Bull Brasil	2017	Série D	0	0	8	0	—		—		—		8	0
CRB	2017	Série B	22	2	—		—		—		—		22	2
Criciúma	2018	Série B	31	4	16	2	2	0	—		—		49	6
Oeste	2019	Série B	33	3	15	2	2	1	—		—		50	6
Cuiabá	2020	Série B	29	2	9	2	4	0	—		2 (Note: Appearance(s) in Copa Verde)	0	44	4
Cuiabá	2021	Série A	0	0	7	1	2	0	—		—		9	1
Cuiabá	Subtotal		29	2	16	3	6	0	—		2	0	53	5
Goiás	2021	Série B	36	4	2	0	—		—		—		38	4
Goiás	2022	Série A	13	4	11	2	5	0	—		—		29	6
Goiás	Subtotal		49	8	13	2	5	0	—		—		67	10
Career total			278	28	126	20	26	3	1	0	5	1	436	52

== Honours ==
Atlético Goianiense

- Campeonato Goiano: 2011

Tombense

- Campeonato Brasileiro Série D: 2014

Botafogo

- Campeonato Brasileiro Série B: 2015

Ponte Preta

- Campeonato Brasileiro Série C: 2025
