= Igor Inocêncio =

Brazilian footballer (born 1998)

Personal information
- Full name: Igor Inocêncio de Oliveira
- Date of birth: 20 April 1998 (age 28)
- Place of birth: João Pessoa, Brazil
- Height: 1.81 m (5 ft 11 1/2 in)
- Position: Right-back

Team information
- Current team: Cuiabá
- Number: 2

Youth career
- 2016–2017: Auto Esporte
- 2017: → Corinthians (loan)
- 2018: Corinthians
- 2018: Náutico

Senior career*
Years	Team	Apps	(Gls)
2017	Auto Esporte	1	(0)
2019	Águia de Marabá	8	(1)
2019	Lajeadense	9	(1)
2020–2021	Juventude	40	(3)
2021	→ Coritiba (loan)	32	(0)
2021–2023	Ceará	24	(0)
2022	→ CSA (loan)	36	(0)
2023	→ Avaí (loan)	27	(0)
2024–2025	Ponte Preta	43	(2)
2025	Vila Nova	6	(0)
2025–2026	Malut United	29	(2)
2026–	Cuiabá	19	(0)
- * Club domestic league appearances and goals as of 18 November 2026

Igor Inocêncio de Oliveira (born 20 April 1998), known as Igor Inocêncio or just Igor, is a Brazilian professional footballer who plays as a right-back for Cuiabá.

== Career statistics ==
As of 23 September 2021

Club	Season	League			State League		Cup		Continental		Other		Total	
Club	Season	Division	Apps	Goals	Apps	Goals	Apps	Goals	Apps	Goals	Apps	Goals	Apps	Goals
Auto Esporte	2017	Paraibano	—		1	0	—		—		0	0	1	0
Águia de Marabá	2019	Paraense	—		8	1	—		—		0	0	8	1
Lajeadense	2019	Gaúcho A2	—		—		—		—		9 (Note: Appearance(s) in Copa FGF)	1	9	1
Juventude	2020	Série B	26	1	6	1	5	1	—		—		37	3
Juventude	2021	Série A	0	0	3	0	0	0	—		—		3	0
Juventude	Total		26	1	9	1	5	1	—		—		40	3
Coritiba (loan)	2021	Série B	19	0	10	0	3	0	—		—		32	0
Ceará	2021	Série A	6	0	—		—		—		—		6	0
Career total			51	1	28	2	8	1	0	0	9	1	96	5

== Honours ==
Individual

- APPI Indonesian Football Award Best XI: 2025–26
