= Júnior Todinho =

Brazilian footballer (born 1993)

Personal information
- Full name: Geremias Ribeiro Junior
- Date of birth: December 13, 1993 (age 32)
- Place of birth: Salvador, Brazil
- Height: 1.82 m (6 ft 0 in)
- Position: Forward

Team information
- Current team: Náutico
- Number: 29

Youth career
- 2012–2013: Serrano

Senior career*
Years	Team	Apps	(Gls)
2015	Grapiúna	0	(0)
2016–2017	Vitória da Conquista	22	(8)
2017–2018	Vitória	8	(0)
2019	Cuiabá	36	(8)
2020	Guarani	36	(11)
2021	Juventude	7	(0)
2021	Guarani	11	(1)
2022	Santo André	11	(5)
2022	Brusque-SC	17	(1)
2022	Mirassol	4	(0)
2022–2024	Água Santa	21	(5)
2023	→ ABC (loan)	10	(2)
2023	→ CSA (loan)	4	(1)
2024–2025	Vila Nova	63	(12)
2026–	Náutico	28	(4)
- * Club domestic league appearances and goals as of 18 November 2026

Geremias Ribeiro Júnior (born December 13, 1993) commonly known as Júnior Todinho, is a Brazilian professional footballer who plays as a forward for Náutico.
