= Derek (footballer) =

Brazilian footballer (born 1997)

Personal information
- Full name: Derek Freitas Ribeiro
- Date of birth: 2 December 1997 (age 28)
- Place of birth: Rio de Janeiro, Brazil
- Height: 1.85 m (6 ft 1 in)
- Position: Forward

Team information
- Current team: Náutico
- Number: 72

Youth career
- Nova Iguaçu
- 2015: GRECAL
- 2016: Fluminense

Senior career*
Years	Team	Apps	(Gls)
2017–2019	Artsul	12	(3)
2018–2019	→ Madureira (loan)	14	(1)
2019–2022	Metalist 1925 Kharkiv	35	(12)
2022	→ Chapecoense (loan)	10	(1)
2022	Chapecoense	12	(0)
2023–2024	Guarani	45	(10)
2024–	Atlético Goianiense	33	(3)
2025	→ JEF United Chiba (loan)	5	(0)
2026–	→ Náutico (loan)	30	(3)
- * Club domestic league appearances and goals as of 18 November 2026

Derek Freitas Ribeiro (born 2 December 1997), simply known as Derek, is a Brazilian professional footballer who plays as a forward for Náutico.

== Career ==
=== Early career ===
Born in Rio de Janeiro, Derek began his career with the youth sides of Nova Iguaçu. In 2016, after a short period with GRECAL, he joined the youth categories of Fluminense.

Derek moved to Artsul ahead of the 2017 season, and made his senior debut on 17 June of that year, in a 2–0 Campeonato Carioca Série B1 home win over Gonçalense. He scored his first senior goals on 19 August, netting a brace in a 4–2 away win over Barra Mansa.

In November 2017, Derek signed for Madureira. He was mainly a backup option during his spell at the club.

=== Metalist 1925 Kharkiv ===
On 25 October 2019, Derek moved abroad and signed a contract with Ukrainian First League side Metalist 1925 Kharkiv. He made his debut for the club the following day, starting and scoring his team's third in a 4–2 away win over Kremin Kremenchuk.

Derek was a regular starter for Metalist in the 2020–21 season, as they achieved a first-ever promotion to the Ukrainian Premier League. He left the country in March 2022, after the Russian invasion of Ukraine started.

=== Chapecoense ===
On 1 April 2022, Derek was announced at Série B side Chapecoense on loan. He scored on his club debut eight days later, netting a last-minute equalizer in a 1–1 home draw against Ituano.

On 1 July 2022, Metalist announced the departure of Derek after his contract expired; he subsequently joined Chape permanently. On 18 November, after 22 matches, he announced his departure from the club.

=== Guarani ===
On 14 December 2022, Derek agreed to a contract with fellow second division side Guarani. After being rarely used during the 2023 Campeonato Paulista due to injuries, he became the top scorer of Bugre during the 2023 Série B with 10 goals.

=== JEF United Chiba ===
On 29 December 2024, Derek was abroad to Japan for the first time and loan transfer to J2 club, JEF United Chiba from 2025 season.

== Career statistics ==
=== Club ===
As of the start for 2025 season.

Appearances and goals by club, season and competition
Club	Season	League			State League		National cup		League cup		Continental		Other		Total	
Club	Season	Division	Apps	Goals	Apps	Goals	Apps	Goals	Apps	Goals	Apps	Goals	Apps	Goals	Apps	Goals
Artsul	2017	Carioca Série B1	—		12 (Note: Appearance(s) in Campeonato Carioca Série B1)	3	—								12	3
Madureira	2018	Série D	3	0	6 (Note: Appearance(s) in Campeonato Carioca)	1	1	0	—						10	1
Madureira	2019	Carioca	—		4	0	—								4	0
Madureira	Total		3	0	22	4	1	0	—						26	4
Metalist 1925 Kharkiv	2019–20	Ukrainian First League	14	7	—										14	7
Metalist 1925 Kharkiv	2020–21	Ukrainian First League	21	5	—										21	5
Metalist 1925 Kharkiv	2021–22	Ukrainian Premier League	0	0	—										0	0
Metalist 1925 Kharkiv	Total		35	12	—										35	12
Chapecoense	2022	Série B	22	1	—										22	1
Guarani	2023	Série B	34	10	4 (Note: Appearance(s) in Campeonato Paulista)	0	—								38	10
Guarani	2024	Série B	0	0	7	0	—								7	0
Guarani	Total		56	11	11	0	—								67	11
Atlético Goianiense	2024	Série A	25	3	—		3	0	—						28	3
Atlético Goianiense	Total		25	3	–		3	0	—						28	3
JEF United Chiba	2025	J2 League	0	0	–		0	0	0	0	—				0	0
JEF United Chiba	Total		0	0	–		0	0	0	0	—				0	0
Career total			119	26	33	4	4	0	0	0	0	0	0	0	156	30
