= Mateus Silva =

Brazilian footballer

Personal information
- Full name: Mateus Ferreira da Silva
- Date of birth: 3 July 1995 (age 31)
- Place of birth: Marilac, Brazil
- Height: 1.92 m (6 ft 4 in)
- Position: Defender

Team information
- Current team: Náutico
- Number: 25

Youth career
- 2013–2015: Ituano

Senior career*
| Years | Team | Apps | (Gls) |
| 2016–2021 | Ituano | 76 | (6) |
| 2017 | → São Bento (loan) | 6 | (0) |
| 2018 | → Imperatriz (loan) | 2 | (0) |
| 2018 | → Guarani de Palhoça (loan) | 8 | (0) |
| 2019 | → Criciúma (loan) | 0 | (0) |
| 2022–2023 | Cruzeiro | 5 | (0) |
| 2022–2023 | → Ponte Preta (loan) | 15 | (2) |
| 2023–2025 | Ponte Preta | 52 | (1) |
| 2025 | → Náutico (loan) | 10 | (0) |
| 2026– | Náutico | 16 | (0) |
- * Club domestic league appearances and goals as of 18 November 2026

Mateus Ferreira da Silva (born 3 July 1995 in Marilac) is a Brazilian footballer who plays for Náutico as a defender.

== Career statistics ==
As of 22 February 2017

| Club | Season | League | | | State League | | Cup | | Continental | | Other | | Total | |
| Club | Season | Division | Apps | Goals | Apps | Goals | Apps | Goals | Apps | Goals | Apps | Goals | Apps | Goals |
|---|---|---|---|---|---|---|---|---|---|---|---|---|---|---|
| Ituano | 2016 | Série D | — | | — | | — | | — | | 5 (Note: All appearance(s) in Copa Paulista) | 0 | 5 | 0 |
| Ituano | 2017 | Paulista | — | | 3 | 0 | — | | — | | — | | 3 | 0 |
| Ituano | Subtotal | | — | | 3 | 0 | — | | — | | 5 | 0 | 8 | 0 |
| Career total | | | 0 | 0 | 3 | 0 | 0 | 0 | — | | 5 | 0 | 8 | 0 |
