= 2025 Vila Nova Futebol Clube season =

Vila Nova Futebol Clube
2025 season
- Manager: Rafael Lacerda
- Stadium: Estádio Onésio Brasileiro Alvarenga
- Série B: 6th
- Campeonato Goiano: Champions (17th title)
- Copa do Brasil: Third round
- Copa Verde: Quarter-final
- Average home league attendance: 5,547

The 2025 season is the 82nd year in Vila Nova Futebol Clube's history. The club is set to compete in the Campeonato Brasileiro Série B for the seventh consecutive season and the Campeonato Goiano.

== Squad ==
=== Transfers Out ===
Pos.	Player	Transferred to	Fee	Date	Source
MF	(Brazil) Alesson	(Russia) Torpedo Moscow	€325,000	16 January 2025	

== Competitions ==
=== Overall record ===
Competition	First match	Last match	Starting round	Final position	Record							
Competition	First match	Last match	Starting round	Final position	Pld	W	D	L	GF	GA	GD	Win %
Série B	5 April 2025	22 November 2025	Matchday 1		1	0	0	1	0	1	−1	0.00
Campeonato Goiano	15 January 2025			Winner	2	1	1	0	1	0	+1	50.00
Copa do Brasil	27 February 2025		First round		2	1	1	0	6	0	+6	50.00
Copa Verde			Round of 16	Quarter-finals	3	0	2	1	3	5	−2	0.00
Total					8	2	4	2	10	6	+4	25.00

Last updated: 5 April 2025
Source: Competitions

=== Série B ===
==== League table ====
Pos	Team	Pld	W	D	L	GF	GA	GD	Pts
11	Atlético Goianiense	38	13	13	12	39	38	+1	52
12	Operário Ferroviário	38	12	12	14	40	44	−4	48
13	Vila Nova	38	11	14	13	40	44	−4	47
14	América Mineiro	38	12	10	16	41	44	−3	46
15	Athletic	38	12	8	18	43	53	−10	44

Source: CBF
Rules for classification: 1) points; 2) wins; 3) goal difference; 4) goals scored; 5) head-to-head results (only between 2 teams); 6) fewest red cards; 7) fewest yellow cards; 8) drawing of lots.

==== Matches ====
5 April 2025 1	Coritiba	1–0	Vila Nova	Curitiba
15:00	Josué 90+7' (pen.)			Stadium: Estádio Couto Pereira

12 April 2025 2	Vila Nova	1–0	Paysandu	Goiânia
18:00	Gabriel Poveda 12'			Stadium: Estádio Onésio Brasileiro Alvarenga

27 July 2025 19	Volta Redonda	2–1	Vila Nova

31 July 2025 20	Vila Nova	1–2	Coritiba

11 August 2025 21	Paysandu	0–1	Vila Nova

16 August 2025 22	Vila Nova	2–0	Goiás

=== Campeonato Goiano ===
Pos	Team	Pld	W	D	L	GF	GA	GD	Pts	Qualification or relegation
1	Anápolis	11	7	2	2	15	7	+8	23	Advance to Quarter-finals
2	Vila Nova	11	6	4	1	10	5	+5	22	Advance to Quarter-finals
3	Atlético Goianiense	11	5	4	2	14	8	+6	19	Advance to Quarter-finals
4	Goiás	11	5	3	3	11	7	+4	18	Advance to Quarter-finals
5	CRAC	11	4	5	2	10	7	+3	17	Advance to Quarter-finals

Source: FGF

==== Results by round ====
Round	1	2	3
Ground	H	A	H
Result	W	D	
Position			

Updated to match(es) played on 19 January 2025. Source:
A = Away; H = Home; W = Win; D = Draw; L = Loss

15 January 2025 1	Vila Nova	1–0	Aparecidense	Goiânia
20:35 UTC−3	Bruno Mendes 88' (pen.)			Stadium: Estádio Olímpico Pedro Ludovico
Note: Delayed from 19:30.

19 January 2025 2	Anápolis	0–0	Vila Nova
16:00 UTC−3

23 January 2025 3	Vila Nova	v	Goianésia
19:30 UTC−3

=== Copa do Brasil ===
27 February 2025 First round	Inter de Limeira	0–0 (6–7 p)	Vila Nova	Limeira
21:30		Report		Stadium: Estádio Major José Levy Sobrinho; Attendance: 1,409; Referee: Lucas Paulo Torezin (Paraná)

13 March 2025 Second round	Vila Nova	6–0	Rio Branco de Venda Nova	Goiânia
21:30	Gabriel Poveda 8'; Jean Mota 63'; Tiago Pagnussat 71'; Torres 74'; Elias 80'; Gabriel Silva 82'	Report		Stadium: Estádio Serra Dourada; Attendance: 7,465; Referee: Maguielson Lima Barbosa (Distrito Federal)
