= Joílson (footballer, born 1991) =

Brazilian footballer

Personal information
- Full name: Joílson de Jesus Cardoso
- Date of birth: 25 May 1991 (age 35)
- Place of birth: Osasco, Brazil
- Height: 1.88 m (6 ft 2 in)
- Position: Centre back

Team information
- Current team: Amazonas

Youth career
- 2010–2011: Criciúma

Senior career*
Years	Team	Apps	(Gls)
2012–2015	Criciúma	29	(1)
2012	→ Camboriú (loan)	0	(0)
2013	→ CRAC (loan)	2	(0)
2016	Cuiabá	12	(1)
2017	Penapolense	14	(1)
2017–2018	Oeste	69	(2)
2019–2021	Chapecoense	73	(2)
2019	→ São Bento (loan)	16	(0)
2022	São Bernardo	13	(0)
2022	Novorizontino	16	(0)
2023–2025	Água Santa	16	(0)
2024	→ Ponte Preta (loan)	16	(1)
2026	Caxias	5	(0)
2026–	Amazonas	0	(0)
- * Club domestic league appearances and goals as of 10 November 2026

Joílson de Jesus Cardoso (born 25 May 1991), simply known as Joílson, is a Brazilian footballer who plays as a central defender for Amazonas.

== Career statistics ==
As of 25 October 2021

Club	Season	League			State League		Cup		Continental		Other		Total	
Club	Season	Division	Apps	Goals	Apps	Goals	Apps	Goals	Apps	Goals	Apps	Goals	Apps	Goals
Criciúma	2011	Série B	0	0	0	0	—		—		—		0	0
Criciúma	2012	Série B	0	0	2	0	0	0	—		—		2	0
Criciúma	2013	Série A	0	0	3	0	—		—		—		3	0
Criciúma	2014	Série A	10	1	3	0	0	0	0	0	—		13	1
Criciúma	2015	Série B	4	0	7	0	1	2	—		—		12	2
Criciúma	Subtotal		14	1	15	0	1	2	0	0	—		30	3
Camboriú (loan)	2012	Catarinense	—		0	0	—		—		5 (Note: Appearance(s) in Copa Santa Catarina)	0	5	0
CRAC (loan)	2013	Série C	2	0	—		0	0	—		—		2	0
Cuiabá	2016	Série C	4	1	8	0	2	0	0	0	1 (Note: Appearance(s) in Copa Verde)	0	15	1
Penapolense	2017	Paulista A2	—		14	1	—		—		—		14	1
Oeste	2017	Série B	34	0	—		—		—		—		34	0
Oeste	2018	Série B	24	1	11	1	1	0	—		—		36	2
Oeste	Subtotal		58	1	11	1	1	0	—		—		70	2
Chapecoense	2019	Série A	0	0	7	1	1	0	0	0	—		8	1
Chapecoense	2020	Série B	25	0	12	1	1	0	—		—		38	1
Chapecoense	2021	Série A	6	0	0	0	0	0	—		0	0	6	0
Chapecoense	Subtotal		31	0	19	2	2	0	0	0	0	0	52	2
São Bento (loan)	2019	Série B	16	0	—		—		—		—		16	0
Career total			125	3	64	4	6	2	0	0	6	0	201	9

== Honours ==
Criciúma

- Campeonato Catarinense: 2013

Chapecoense

- Campeonato Catarinense: 2020
- Campeonato Brasileiro Série B: 2020
