= Marilac =

Municipality in Minas Gerais, Brazil

Coordinates: 18°28′S 42°11′W

- Municipality
- Interactive map of Marilac
- Country: Brazil
- Region: Southeast
- State: Minas Gerais
- Mesoregion: Vale do Rio Doce

Population (2022 Census)
  - Total: 4,224
  - Estimate (2025): 4,323
- Time zone: UTC−3 (BRT)

Marilac is a municipality in the state of Minas Gerais in the Southeast region of Brazil with population 4,224.

== See also ==
- List of municipalities in Minas Gerais
