= Euller (footballer, born 2002) =

Brazilian footballer

Personal information
- Full name: Euller Ribeiro dos Santos
- Date of birth: 26 April 2002 (age 24)
- Place of birth: Formosa, Brazil
- Height: 1.90 m (6 ft 3 in)
- Position: Centre-back

Team information
- Current team: São José-SP
- Number: 25

Youth career
- 2019–2023: Ponte Preta

Senior career*
Years	Team	Apps	(Gls)
2024	Ponte Preta	0	(0)
2024	→ Linense (loan)	10	(0)
2024	→ Cianorte (loan)	9	(0)
2025–2026	Cianorte	11	(0)
2025	→ Monte Azul (loan)	8	(0)
2026	→ São José-SP (loan)	9	(0)
2026–	São José-SP	0	(0)
- * Club domestic league appearances and goals as of 21:56, 12 June 2026 (UTC)

Euller Ribeiro dos Santos (born 26 April 2002), simply known as Euller, is a Brazilian footballer who plays as a centre-back for São José-SP.

== Career ==
A Ponte Preta youth graduate, Euller was on the bench on two Série B matches in 2023, but remained unused. On 24 January 2024, he was loaned to Linense for the year's Campeonato Paulista Série A2.

Back to Ponte in April 2024, Euller was subsequently loaned to Cianorte. On 6 November, the club announced his signing on a permanent contract until December 2026.

In April 2025, Euller was loaned to Monte Azul for the Série D, before returning to his parent club in September and helping them to win the Taça FPF. On 8 February 2026, he was announced at São José-SP.

== Career statistics ==
As of 12 June 2026

Club	Season	League			State League		Cup		Continental		Other		Total	
Club	Season	Division	Apps	Goals	Apps	Goals	Apps	Goals	Apps	Goals	Apps	Goals	Apps	Goals
Atlético Linense	2024	Paulista A2	—		10	0	—		—		—		10	0
Cianorte	2024	Série D	9	0	—		—		—		—		9	0
Cianorte	2025	Série D	—		8	0	—		—		5 (Note: Appearance(s) in Taça FPF)	1	13	1
Cianorte	2026	Série D	—		3	0	—		—		—		3	0
Cianorte	Total		9	0	11	0	—		—		5	1	25	1
Monte Azul (loan)	2025	Série D	8	0	—		—		—		5 (Note: Appearance(s) in Copa Paulista)	0	13	0
São José-SP	2026	Paulista A2	—		9	0	—		—		0	0	9	0
Career total			17	0	30	0	0	0	0	0	10	1	57	1

== Honours ==
Cianorte

- Taça FPF: 2025
