= Gabriel Risso Patrón =

Argentine footballer (born 1995)

Personal information
- Full name: Gabriel Adolfo Risso Patrón
- Date of birth: 5 November 1995 (age 31)
- Place of birth: Monteros, Argentina
- Height: 1.79 m (5 ft 10 in)
- Position: Left-back

Team information
- Current team: Colón

Youth career
- Ñuñorco
- 2008–2010: Belgrano
- River Plate
- Defensores de Belgrano
- 2015–2016: Ñuñorco
- 2016–2017: Atlético Tucumán

Senior career*
Years	Team	Apps	(Gls)
2017–2026	Tucumán	73	(1)
2023	→ Rafaela (loan)	31	(0)
2024	→ Ponte Preta (loan)	38	(1)
2025	→ Botafogo SP (loan)	46	(0)
2026	Newell's Old Boys	4	(0)
2026–	Colón	6	(0)
- * Club domestic league appearances and goals as of 17:41, 4 October 2026 (UTC)

Gabriel Adolfo Risso Patrón (born 5 November 1995) is an Argentine professional footballer who plays as a left-back for Colón.

== Career ==
Risso Patrón's career started in the youth of local club Ñuñorco, before he was signed by Belgrano in 2008. Two years later, Risso Patrón joined River Plate following a successful trial. Following a short stint with Defensores de Belgrano, he returned to Ñuñorco in 2015. Twelve months later, Atlético Tucumán completed the signing of Risso Patrón. He was an unused substitute once during the 2016–17 Argentine Primera División, which preceded his professional debut arriving in a Copa Sudamericana second stage first leg against Oriente Petrolero on 11 July 2017. Risso Patrón also appeared in the second leg with Oriente Petrolero.

Overall, his first four appearances in senior football all came in the 2017 Copa Sudamericana; as he also featured in the subsequent round of sixteen versus eventual winners Independiente. In the following September, Risso Patrón made another appearance against Independiente in the Copa Argentina prior to making his league bow in an Argentine Primera División fixture with Patronato on 22 September.

== Career statistics ==
As of 1 October 2018.

Club statistics
Club	Season	League			Cup (Note: Includes the Copa Argentina)		League Cup		Continental (Note: Includes the Copa Libertadores and Copa Sudamericana)		Other		Total	
Club	Season	Division	Apps	Goals	Apps	Goals	Apps	Goals	Apps	Goals	Apps	Goals	Apps	Goals
Atlético Tucumán	2016–17	Primera División	0	0	0	0	—		—		0	0	0	0
Atlético Tucumán	2017–18	Primera División	9	0	1	0	—		9 (Note: Four appearances in the 2017 Copa Sudamericana, five appearances in the 2018 Copa Libertadores)	0	0	0	19	0
Atlético Tucumán	2018–19	Primera División	1	0	2	0	—		2 (Note: Two appearances in the 2018 Copa Libertadores)	0	0	0	5	0
Career total			10	0	3	0	—		11	0	0	0	24	0
