= Dicá =

Brazilian footballer

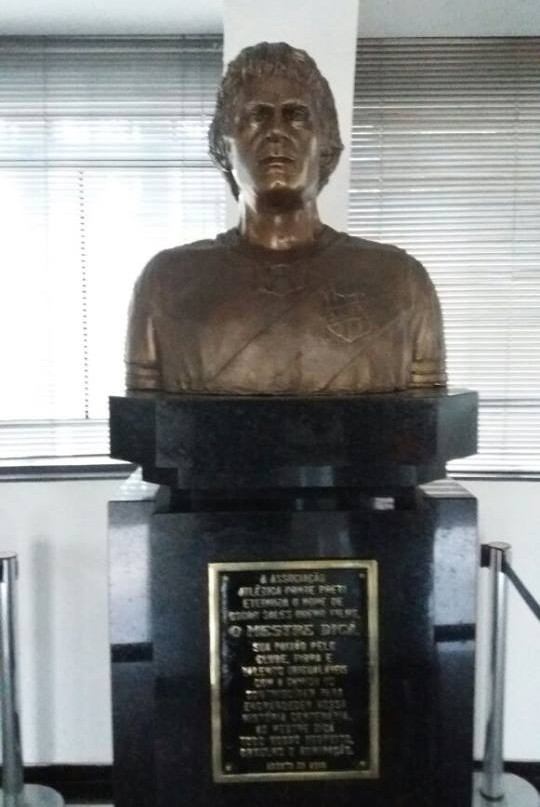
- A bronze bust of Dicá

Personal information
- Full name: Oscar Sales Bueno Filho
- Date of birth: 13 July 1947 (age 79)
- Place of birth: Campinas, Brazil
- Height: 1.72 m (5 ft 8 in)
- Position: Midfielder

Youth career
- 1962–1965: Santa Odília
- 1965–1966: Ponte Preta

Senior career*
Years	Team	Apps	(Gls)
1966–1972	Ponte Preta		
1971	→ Santos (loan)	29	(4)
1972–1976	Portuguesa	164	(37)
1976–1985	Ponte Preta		
1985	Araçatuba		
- * Club domestic league appearances and goals as of 24 September 2023

Oscar Sales Bueno Filho (born 13 July 1947), commonly known as Dicá, is a Brazilian former professional footballer who played as a midfielder. He holds the record for the most appearances for AA Ponte Preta (581), as well as the most goals scored for the club (155).

== Career ==
Dicá began playing at the Santa Odília football school, an amateur team in Campinas. When starting his professional career, he chose Ponte Preta, a club supported by his father. He gained prominence in the 1970s and was signed by Santos in 1971, where he had the opportunity to play alongside Pelé.

After eight months, Dicá returned to Ponte Preta and was later transferred to Portuguesa, the club that won the 1973 Campeonato Paulista. He returned to Ponte Preta for a third spell at the end of 1976, where he became one of the club's greatest players. He remained with the club until 1985, when he joined AE Araçatuba, his final professional club.

== Personal life ==
Dicá lives in Campinas and has occasionally worked as a sports commentator on radio and television in the region.

== Honours ==
Ponte Preta

- Campeonato Paulista Série A2: 1969

Portuguesa

- Campeonato Paulista: 1973
- Taça Estado de São Paulo: 1973
- Copa Governador do Estado de São Paulo: 1976
