= Estádio Moisés Lucarelli =

Football stadium in São Paulo, Brazil

Coordinates: 22°54′49″S 47°03′05″W

- Majestoso
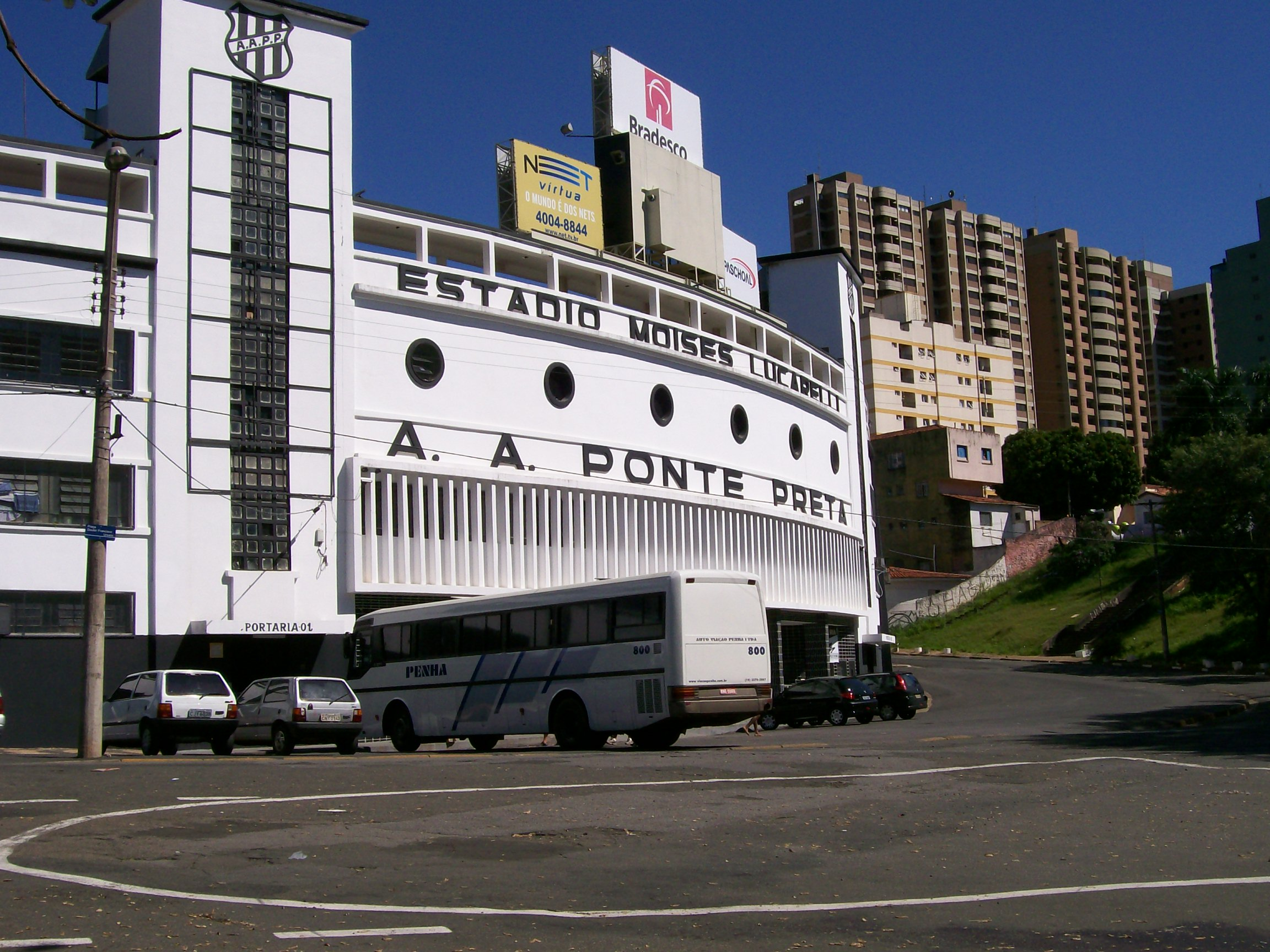
- Sisbrace
- Interactive map of Estádio Moisés Lucarelli
- Full name: Estádio Moisés Lucarelli
- Location: Campinas, SP, Brazil
- Owner: Ponte Preta
- Operator: Ponte Preta
- Capacity: 17,728
- Surface: Natural grass
- Field size: 105 by 68 metres (114.8 yd × 74.4 yd)

Construction
- Opened: September 12, 1948

Tenants
- Ponte Preta; Red Bull Brasil

Estádio Moisés Lucarelli (Moisés Lucarelli Stadium; Portuguese pronunciation: [isˈtadʒju mojˈzɛ(j)z lukaˈɾɛli]), also known as Estádio Majestoso, or just Majestoso, is a football stadium inaugurated on September 12, 1948 in Campinas, São Paulo, with a maximum capacity of 19,728 spectators. The stadium is owned by Associação Atlética Ponte Preta. The stadium has a pitch size of 107m x 70m and its area stands at 36,000 m^{2}. Its formal name honors Moysés Lucarelli, the co-ordinator of the stadium construction works commission. Its nickname, Estádio Majestoso, means Majestic Stadium, because it was the third largest stadium in Brazil at the time of its inauguration.

== History ==
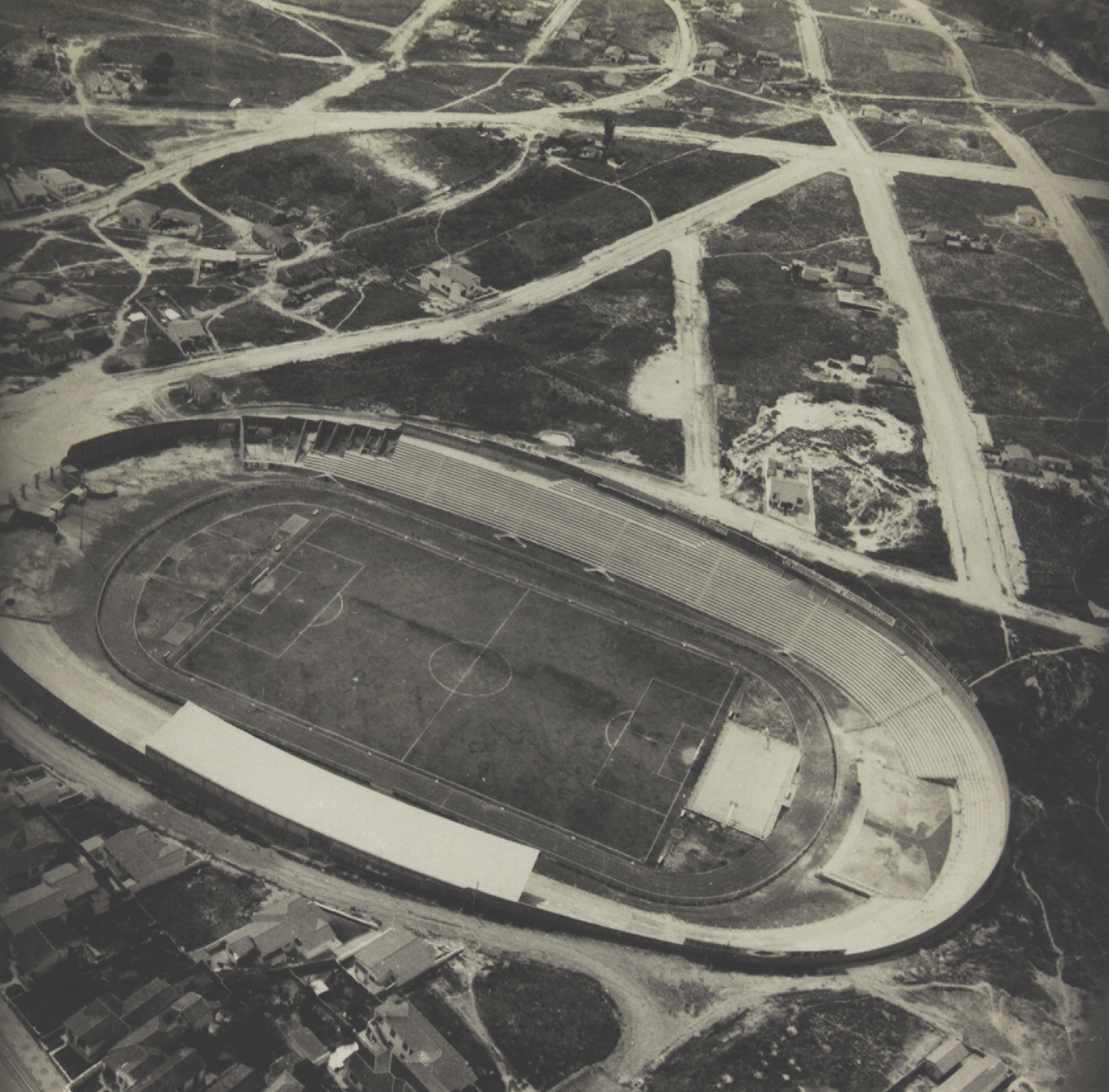
Aerial view of Ponte Preta Stadium still under construction.

The stadium was inaugurated on September 12, 1948. The stadium was built with the financial and laboral help of the people of Ponte Preta. It is named after Moysés Lucarelli, the head figure and the main financial collaborator, buying the land and helping in the arrecadation of raw materials. Lucarelli is said to have lost 40% of his vision and also to have developed corneal ulcer during the construction of the stadium, in consequence of the long hours under the hot sun every day. He originally did not want to be honoured, but the club insisted and, taking advantage of a trip Moysés took to Argentina, the stadium was named "behind his back". That's the most probable reason why his name was spelled differently on the stadium's entrance and official registers.

The inaugural match was played on September 12, 1948, when XV de Piracicaba beat Ponte Preta 3–0, in a game where Ponte missed two penalties. The first goal of the stadium was scored by XV de Piracicaba's Sato.

The stadium's official attendance record currently stands at 34,985, set on February 1, 1978 when São Paulo beat Ponte Preta 3–1. It is popularly said that the actual biggest crowd the stadium ever had was on August 16, 1970, when Ponte faced Pelé's Santos side. While the official attendance stood at 33.500, a huge crowd gathered around the Majestoso to try to watch the King of Football face Dicá's Ponte, who were the defending champions of the Paulista's second division. The score ended 1–0 to the visitors.

The stadium's biggest score was set on April 16, 1994, when Ponte Preta beat Ferroviária 8–1.
