= Pedro Rocha (footballer, born 1998) =

Brazilian footballer

Personal information
- Full name: Pedro Henrique Rocha da Silva
- Date of birth: 1 June 1998 (age 28)
- Place of birth: Parapuã, Brazil
- Height: 1.94 m (6 ft 4 in)
- Position: Goalkeeper

Team information
- Current team: Juventude
- Number: 12

Youth career
- 2017–2019: Itapirense
- 2018–2019: → Ponte Preta (loan)

Senior career*
Years	Team	Apps	(Gls)
2020–2025	Ponte Preta	51	(0)
2020	→ XV de Jaú (loan)	4	(0)
2021	→ Inter de Limeira (loan)	1	(0)
2022	→ Athletic-MG (loan)	14	(0)
2022	→ Aymorés (loan)	5	(0)
2026–	Juventude	3	(0)
- * Club domestic league appearances and goals as of 16 November 2026

Pedro Henrique Rocha da Silva (born 1 June 1998), known as Pedro Rocha or Pedrão, is a Brazilian footballer who plays as a goalkeeper for Juventude.

== Career ==
Born in Parapuã, São Paulo, Pedro Rocha began his career with Itapirense, before moving on loan to the youth sides of Ponte Preta in July 2018.

On 16 January 2020, Pedro Rocha signed a permanent two-year contract with Ponte, being promoted to the first team. In March, however, he was loaned to XV de Jaú, but only started to play for the club in September due to the COVID-19 pandemic.

On 30 May 2021, Pedro Rocha moved to Inter de Limeira also in a temporary deal, but featured in just one match. He was loaned to Athletic-MG for the 2022 Campeonato Mineiro on 9 December, being a regular starter during the competition.

Pedro Rocha only returned to Ponte for the latter stages of the 2022 season, after a loan spell at Aymorés, and made his first team debut on 4 November of that year, starting in a 1–0 Série B away win over Náutico. He then became Caíque França's backup during the entire 2023 campaign.

On 14 January 2024, after França's departure, Pedro Rocha signed a new one-year contract with the Macaca. On 2 February, after starting the 2024 Campeonato Paulista as a first-choice, he further extended his link until 2026.

== Career statistics ==
As of 23 February 2024.

Club	Season	League			State League		Cup		Continental		Other		Total	
Club	Season	Division	Apps	Goals	Apps	Goals	Apps	Goals	Apps	Goals	Apps	Goals	Apps	Goals
Ponte Preta	2019	Série B	0	0	0	0	0	0	—		4 (Note: Appearance(s) in Copa Paulista)	0	4	0
Ponte Preta	2020	Série B	0	0	0	0	0	0	—		—		0	0
Ponte Preta	2021	Série B	0	0	0	0	0	0	—		—		0	0
Ponte Preta	2022	Série B	1	0	—		—		—		—		1	0
Ponte Preta	2023	Série B	2	0	1	0	0	0	—		—		3	0
Ponte Preta	2024	Série B	0	0	9	0	—		—		—		9	0
Ponte Preta	Total		3	0	10	0	0	0	—		4	0	17	0
XV de Jaú (loan)	2020	Paulista 2ª Divisão	—		4	0	—		—		—		4	0
Inter de Limeira (loan)	2021	Série D	1	0	—		—		—		—		1	0
Athletic-MG (loan)	2022	Mineiro	—		14	0	—		—		—		14	0
Aymorés (loan)	2022	Mineiro Módulo II	—		5	0	—		—		—		5	0
Career total			4	0	33	0	0	0	0	0	4	0	41	0

== Honours ==
Ponte Preta

- Campeonato Paulista Série A2: 2023
