= Janiópolis =

Coordinates: 24.1419°S 52.7819°W

- Municipality
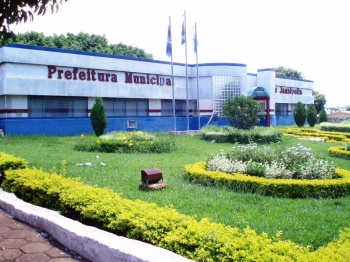

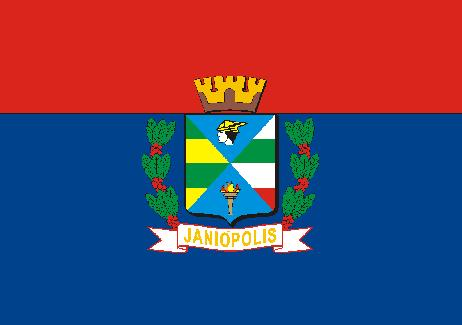
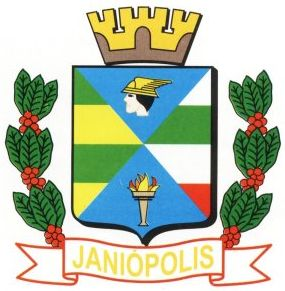
- Flag Coat of arms
- Interactive map of Janiópolis
- Country: Brazil
- Region: Southern
- State: Paraná
- Mesoregion: Centro Ocidental Paranaense

Population (2020)
  - Total: 5,095
- Time zone: UTC−3 (BRT)

Janiópolis is a municipality in the state of Paraná in the Southern Region of Brazil.

== See also ==
- List of municipalities in Paraná
