= Wenderson (footballer, born 1998) =

Brazilian footballer

Personal information
- Full name: Wenderson da Silva Costa Ferreira
- Date of birth: 7 June 1998 (age 28)
- Place of birth: Rio de Janeiro, Brazil
- Height: 1.77 m (5 ft 10 in)
- Position: Midfielder

Team information
- Current team: Náutico
- Number: 8

Youth career
- –2017: Botafogo

Senior career*
Years	Team	Apps	(Gls)
2017–2020	Botafogo	13	(0)
2020–2022	Mafra	13	(0)
2022	Azuriz	11	(0)
2023–2024	Guarani	35	(1)
2024	America Futebol Clube (RN)	13	(3)
2024-2025	Al-Karma SC	9	(0)
2025-	Náutico	65	(0)
- * Club domestic league appearances and goals as of 18 November 2026

Wenderson da Silva Costa Ferreira (born 7 June 1998), commonly known as Wenderson, is a Brazilian footballer who plays as a midfielder for Náutico.

== Career statistics ==
=== Club ===
As of 7 June 2020.

Club	Season	League			State league		Cup		Continental		Other		Total	
Club	Season	Division	Apps	Goals	Apps	Goals	Apps	Goals	Apps	Goals	Apps	Goals	Apps	Goals
Botafogo	2017	Série A	2	0	0	0	0	0	0	0	0	0	2	0
Botafogo	2018	Série A	0	0	0	0	0	0	0	0	0	0	0	0
Botafogo	2019	Série A	4	0	5 (Note: Appearances in the Campeonato Carioca)	0	0	0	0	0	0	0	9	0
Botafogo	2020	Série A	0	0	2	0	0	0	0	0	0	0	2	0
Career total			6	0	7	0	0	0	0	0	0	0	13	0
