= Gabriel Novaes =

Brazilian footballer (born 1999)

Personal information
- Full name: Gabriel Novaes Fernandes
- Date of birth: 5 April 1999 (age 27)
- Place of birth: São Paulo, Brazil
- Height: 1.84 m (6 ft 0 in)
- Position: Forward

Team information
- Current team: Amazonas (on loan from Red Bull Bragantino)
- Number: 91

Youth career
- –2019: São Paulo

Senior career*
Years	Team	Apps	(Gls)
2017–2021	São Paulo	0	(0)
2019	→ Barcelona B (loan)	6	(0)
2019	→ Córdoba (loan)	12	(1)
2020	→ Juventude (loan)	5	(0)
2020–2021	→ Bahia (loan)	24	(4)
2021–	Red Bull Bragantino	38	(3)
2023	→ Goiás (loan)	4	(0)
2024	→ Ponte Preta (loan)	30	(7)
2025	→ Criciúma (loan)	9	(0)
2025–	→ Amazonas (loan)	4	(0)

International career^{‡}
2017	Brazil U20	3	(1)
- * Club domestic league appearances and goals as of 18 December 2025 ‡ National team caps and goals as of 10:36, 24 September 2020 (UTC)

Gabriel Novaes Fernandes (born 5 April 1999), known as Gabriel Novaes, is a Brazilian footballer who plays as a forward for Amazonas on loan from Red Bull Bragantino.

== Career statistics ==
=== Club ===
As of 17 December 2021.

Club	Season	League			State league		Cup		Continental		Other		Total	
Club	Season	Division	Apps	Goals	Apps	Goals	Apps	Goals	Apps	Goals	Apps	Goals	Apps	Goals
São Paulo	2017	Série A	0	0	—		0	0	—		2 (Note: Appearance(s) in Copa Paulista)	0	2	0
São Paulo	2019	Série A	0	0	—		0	0	—		—		0	0
São Paulo	2020	Série A	0	0	—		0	0	—		—		0	0
São Paulo	Total		0	0	—		0	0	—		2	0	2	0
Barcelona B (loan)	2018–19	Segunda División B	6	0	—		—		—		0	0	6	0
Córdoba (loan)	2019–20	Segunda División B	12	1	—		0	0	—		—		12	1
Juventude (loan)	2020	Série B	4	0	—		1	0	—		—		5	0
Bahia (loan)	2020	Série A	13	2	—		0	0	2 (Note: Appearance(s) in Copa Sudamericana)	0	—		15	2
Bahia (loan)	2021	Série A	0	0	0	0	2	0	0	0	7 (Note: Appearance(s) in Copa do Nordeste)	2	9	2
Bahia (loan)	Total		13	2	0	0	2	0	2	0	7	2	24	4
Red Bull Bragantino	2021	Série A	16	1	2	0	0	0	3	0	—		21	1
Career total			51	4	2	0	3	0	5	0	9	2	83	6

== Honours ==
São Paulo

- Copa São Paulo de Futebol Jr.: 2019

Goiás

- Copa Verde: 2023
