= Vila Nova Futebol Clube =

Brazilian association football club based in Goiânia, Goiás, Brazil

Vila Nova
- Full name: Vila Nova Futebol Clube
- Nicknames: Tigre (Tiger); Tigrão (Big Tiger)
- Founded: July 29, 1943; 83 years ago
- Ground: Onésio Brasileiro Alvarenga
- Capacity: 11,788
- President: Hugo Jorge Bravo
- Head coach: Guto Ferreira
- League: Campeonato Brasileiro Série B Campeonato Goiano
- 2025 2025: Série B, 13th of 20; Goiano, 1st of 12 (champions)
- Website: www.vilanovafc.com.br
Home colors	Away colors	Third colors

Vila Nova Futebol Clube, commonly referred to as Vila Nova, is a Brazilian professional club based in Goiânia, Goiás founded on 29 July 1943. It competes in the Campeonato Brasileiro Série B, the second tier of Brazilian football, as well as in the Campeonato Goiano, the top flight of the Goiás state football league.

== History ==
In 1943 the club was founded as Vila Nova Futebol Clube. Three years later, in 1946, the club changed its name to Operário. In 1949 the club changed its name to Araguaia, then in 1950 it was renamed to Fênix Futebol Clube and in 1955 the club changed its name to its current name, Vila Nova Futebol Clube.

In 1961 Vila Nova won their first state championship. In 1977 the team debuted in Campeonato Brasileiro and finished in 55th place. From 1977 to 1980, Vila Nova was state champion in four successive seasons.

In 1996 the club won the Campeonato Brasileiro Third Division without losing a single match. In 1999, Vila Nova competed for the first time in an international competition, the Copa CONMEBOL but was eliminated in the first round, becoming the first Goiás state team to play in an international competition. In 2000, the club won the Campeonato Goiano Second Division after being excluded from the league as a result of forfeiting the final match, and in 2001 and 2005, the club won the Campeonato Goiano. In 2006, it was relegated to the Série C, returning to the Série B in the following year. In 2011, the team was relegated again to the Série C, being promoted to the Campeonato Brasileiro Série B in 2013. However, in 2014, it was relegated in the state championship.

== Stadium ==
Home stadiums are the Onésio Brasileiro Alvarenga stadium (capacity 11,788) and Serra Dourada stadium (capacity 54,048).

== Players ==
=== Current squad ===
As of 30 October 2026

Note: Flags indicate national team as defined under FIFA eligibility rules; some limited exceptions apply. Players may hold more than one non-FIFA nationality.

No.	Pos.	Nation	Player
1	GK	BRA	Helton Leite
3	DF	BRA	Tiago Pagnussat
4	DF	BRA	Douglas Mendes
5	MF	BRA	João Vieira
6	DF	BRA	Higor Luiz
7	FW	BRA	André Luis
8	MF	BRA	Willian Maranhão
9	FW	BRA	Lincoln
10	MF	BRA	Marquinhos Gabriel (captain)
11	FW	BRA	Ryan
13	DF	BRA	Willian Formiga
14	DF	BRA	Anderson Jesus
15	MF	BRA	Dudu
16	DF	BRA	Igor Cariús (on loan from Mirassol)
17	FW	BRA	Everton Galdino (on loan from FC Tokyo)
18	MF	BRA	Enzo

No.	Pos.	Nation	Player
20	MF	BRA	Nathan Camargo (on loan from Red Bull Bragantino)
21	MF	BRA	Higor Meritão
22	DF	BRA	Hayner (on loan from Santos)
23	DF	BRA	Jonathan Costa (on loan from Guarani)
29	GK	BRA	Dalberson (on loan from Guarani)
30	GK	BRA	Gabriel Átila
31	MF	BRA	Dodô (on loan from Remo)
33	FW	BRA	Bruno Xavier
49	FW	BRA	Dellatorre
70	FW	BRA	Emerson Urso
99	FW	BRA	Janderson
—	DF	BRA	Breno Bora (on loan from Foz do Iguaçu)
—	DF	BRA	Samuel Lucas
—	FW	BRA	Gustavo Puskas
—	FW	BRA	Rafa Silva

=== Youth team ===
Note: Flags indicate national team as defined under FIFA eligibility rules; some limited exceptions apply. Players may hold more than one non-FIFA nationality.

No.	Pos.	Nation	Player
25	MF	BRA	Miguel Delfino
26	DF	BRA	Luiz Eduardo
27	FW	BRA	Lucas Soares
28	FW	BRA	Rian Lucas
32	DF	BRA	Gabriel Delfino
34	DF	BRA	Alex Haren
35	MF	BRA	Breno

No.	Pos.	Nation	Player
39	FW	BRA	João Pedro
43	DF	BRA	Lucas Paulino
44	DF	BRA	Carlos Eduardo
77	FW	BRA	Jackson
79	FW	BRA	Leozão
97	FW	BRA	Gabriel Dias
—	MF	BRA	Kerlon

=== Out on loan ===
Note: Flags indicate national team as defined under FIFA eligibility rules; some limited exceptions apply. Players may hold more than one non-FIFA nationality.

No.	Pos.	Nation	Player
—	GK	BRA	Halls (at Sport Recife until 30 November 2026)
—	DF	BRA	Weverton (at Kyoto Sanga until 30 June 2027)
—	DF	BRA	Rian (at Guarani until 30 November 2026)

No.	Pos.	Nation	Player
—	MF	BRA	João Lucas (at Caxias until 30 November 2026)
—	MF	BRA	Marco Antônio (at Botafogo-SP until 30 November 2026)
—	FW	BRA	Luan Andrey (at Zimbru Chișinău until 31 December 2026)

== Supporters ==
Like all Brazilian football teams, Vila Nova has their own group of die-hard fans who call themselves 'TEV' – Torcida Esquadrão Vilanovense (usually referring to themselves as simply 'Esquadrão'). Many members of TEV come from an area of Goiánia called Zona Leste which is notorious for its crime rate. A popular song sung by TEV at Vila games is:

Vila, Vila, Vila minha vida,
Vila, Vila minha história,
Vila, Vila meu amor!

English translation

Vila, Vila, Vila my life,
Vila, Vila my history,
Vila, Vila my love!

== Rivals ==
Vila Nova's greatest rival is Goiás, with whom there is constant argument about which club has the largest fanbase. A common view is the claim that Vila Nova has the largest fanbase in Goiânia, and Goiás has the largest fanbase in Goiás state. Some Goiás supporters claim their club has also the biggest number of fans in Goiânia. Either way Vila Nova has an estimated fanbase of about 35,000, which is pretty big for a Brazilian second tier club. In the 2011 Série B season, Vila Nova will play Goiás (after Goias were relegated from Série A in 2010) for the first time in the Série B since 1998. They also encounter each other every year during the Campeonato Goiano (state championship). During a game on 1 May 2011 at the Serra Dourada, both teams were involved in a mass brawl on and off the pitch after the Campeonato Goiano semifinal.

== Honours ==
=== Official tournaments ===
National
Competitions	Titles	Seasons
Campeonato Brasileiro Série C	3	1996, 2015, 2020
State
Competitions	Titles	Seasons
Campeonato Goiano	16	1961, 1962, 1963, 1969, 1973, 1977, 1978, 1979, 1980, 1982, 1984, 1993, 1995, 2001, 2005, 2025
Copa Goiás	3	1969, 1971, 1976
Copa Leonino Caiado	2	1975-II, 1979
Campeonato Goiano Second Division	2	2000, 2015

- record

=== Others tournaments ===
==== State ====
- Torneio Início do Campeonato Goiano (4): 1964, 1965, 1969, 1972

==== City ====
- Taça Cidade de Goiânia (6): 1961, 1962, 1963, 1966, 1972, 1980

=== Runners-up ===
- Copa Verde (3): 2021, 2022, 2024
- Copa Centro-Oeste (3): 1999, 2000, 2001
- Campeonato Goiano (11): 1950, 1965, 1971, 1989, 1994, 1998, 1999, 2004, 2017, 2021, 2024
- Copa Goiás (2): 1967, 1993
- Copa Leonino Caiado (2): 1973, 1975-I

=== Women's Football ===
- Campeonato Goiano de Futebol Feminino (3): 2021, 2024, 2025

== See also ==
- Vila Nova Basquete Clube
