= 2024 Botafogo Futebol Clube (SP) season =

Botafogo Futebol Clube
2024 season
- Manager: Paulo Gomes
- Stadium: Estádio Santa Cruz
- Campeonato Brasileiro Série B: 17th
- Copa do Brasil: Third round
- Top goalscorer: League: Alex Sandro (2); All: Alex Sandro (8)

In the 2024 season, Botafogo Futebol Clube will participate in the Campeonato Brasileiro Série B and the Copa do Brasil.

== Players ==
As of 16 May 2024

Note: Flags indicate national team as defined under FIFA eligibility rules; some limited exceptions apply. Players may hold more than one non-FIFA nationality.

No.	Pos.	Nation	Player
—	GK	BRA	Brenno
—	GK	BRA	João Carlos
—	GK	BRA	Michael Fracaro
—	GK	BRA	Victor Souza
—	DF	BRA	Bernardo Schappo (on loan from Fortaleza)
—	DF	BRA	Ericson
—	DF	BRA	Fábio Sanches
—	DF	BRA	João Maranini
—	DF	BRA	Lucas Dias
—	DF	BRA	Matheus Costa
—	DF	BRA	Jean Victor
—	DF	BRA	Patrick Brey
—	DF	BRA	Rafinha
—	DF	BRA	Thassio
—	DF	BRA	Wallison
—	MF	BRA	Arthur Mosca

No.	Pos.	Nation	Player
—	MF	BRA	Carlos Manuel
—	MF	BRA	Fillipe Soutto
—	MF	BRA	Gustavo Bochecha
—	MF	BRA	João Costa
—	MF	ARG	Leandro Maciel
—	MF	BRA	Matheus Barbosa
—	FW	BRA	Alex Sandro
—	FW	BRA	Carlos Eduardo
—	FW	BRA	Douglas Baggio
—	FW	BRA	Emerson Negueba (on loan from Cuiabá)
—	FW	BRA	Gustavo
—	FW	BRA	Jonas Toró (on loan from Panathinaikos)
—	FW	BRA	Leandro Pereira
—	FW	BRA	Robinho
—	FW	BRA	Thalles
—	FW	BRA	Willian

=== Youth team ===
Note: Flags indicate national team as defined under FIFA eligibility rules; some limited exceptions apply. Players may hold more than one non-FIFA nationality.

No.	Pos.	Nation	Player
—	MF	BRA	Pedro Tortello
—	MF	BRA	Rafael Castro

=== Out on loan ===
Note: Flags indicate national team as defined under FIFA eligibility rules; some limited exceptions apply. Players may hold more than one non-FIFA nationality.

No.	Pos.	Nation	Player
—	DF	BRA	Luis Felipe (to Santa Cruz until 30 April 2024)

== Competitions ==
=== Overall record ===
Competition	First match	Last match	Starting round	Final position	Record							
Competition	First match	Last match	Starting round	Final position	Pld	W	D	L	GF	GA	GD	Win %
Série B	20 April 2024	November 2024	Matchday 1		37	10	12	15	33	50	−17	27.03
Campeonato Paulista	20 January 2024	9 March 2024	Regular season	Regular season	12	3	3	6	8	16	−8	25.00
Copa do Brasil	20 February 2024	23 May 2024	First round	Third round	4	2	1	1	5	4	+1	50.00
Total					53	15	16	22	46	70	−24	28.30

Last updated: 25 July 2024
Source: Soccerway

=== Campeonato Brasileiro Série B ===
==== League table ====
Pos	Team	Pld	W	D	L	GF	GA	GD	Pts
12	Coritiba	38	14	8	16	41	44	−3	50
13	Paysandu	38	12	14	12	41	43	−2	50
14	Botafogo-SP	38	11	12	15	36	51	−15	45
15	Chapecoense	38	11	11	16	34	45	−11	44
16	CRB	38	11	10	17	38	45	−7	43

Source: CBF
Rules for classification: 1) points; 2) wins; 3) goal difference; 4) goals scored; 5) head-to-head results (only between 2 teams); 6) fewest red cards; 7) fewest yellow cards; 8) drawing of lots.

==== Results summary ====
Overall								Home						Away					
Pld	W	D	L	GF	GA	GD	Pts	W	D	L	GF	GA	GD	W	D	L	GF	GA	GD
14	4	5	5	11	15	−4	17	2	4	2	5	4	+1	2	1	3	6	11	−5

Last updated: 17 July 2024.

==== Results by round ====
Round	1	2	3	4	5	6	7	8	9	10	11	12	13	14	15	16
Ground	H	A	H	A	H	A	H	A	A	H	H	A	H	A	H	H
Result	D	D	D	L	D	L	L	W	L	W	W	W	D	L	L	
Position																

Updated to match(es) played on 17 July 2024. Source:
A = Away; H = Home; W = Win; D = Draw; L = Loss

==== Matches ====
19 April 2024 1	Botafogo-SP	0–0	América Mineiro	Ribeirão Preto
				Stadium: Estádio Santa Cruz

27 April 2024 2	Paysandu	1–1	Botafogo-SP	Belém
				Stadium: Mangueirão

7 May 2024 3	Botafogo-SP	0–0	Mirassol	Ribeirão Preto
				Stadium: Estádio Santa Cruz

11 May 2024 4	Guarani	2–0	Botafogo-SP	Campinas
				Stadium: Estádio Brinco de Ouro

14 May 2024 5	Botafogo-SP	0–0	Chapecoense	Ribeirão Preto
				Stadium: Estádio Santa Cruz

18 May 2024 6	Goiás	4–0	Botafogo-SP	Goiânia
				Stadium: Estádio da Serrinha

27 May 2024 7	Botafogo-SP	0–1	Novorizontino	Ribeirão Preto
				Stadium: Estádio Santa Cruz

3 June 2024 8	Santos	1–2	Botafogo-SP	Londrina
20:00 UTC−3				Stadium: Estádio do Café

16 June 2024 10	Botafogo-SP	1–0	Vila Nova	Ribeirão Preto
				Stadium: Estádio Santa Cruz

19 June 2024 11	Botafogo-SP	2–0	Ponte Preta	Ribeirão Preto
				Stadium: Estádio Santa Cruz

22 June 2024 12	Operário Ferroviário	0–1	Botafogo-SP	Ponta Grossa
17:00 UTC−3			Lucas Vinicius Dias Costa (yellow card) 52' (yellow-red card) 87'; Bochecha 90+5'	Stadium: Estádio Germano Krüger; Attendance: 2,642; Referee: Fabio Augusto Santos Junior

29 June 2024 13	Botafogo-SP	1–1	Sport Recife	Ribeirão Preto
17:00 UTC−3				Stadium: Estádio Santa Cruz; Referee: Yuri Elino Ferreira da Cruz

7 July 2024 14	Ituano	3–2	Botafogo-SP	Itu
16:00 UTC−3				Stadium: Estádio Novelli Júnior; Referee: Lucas Canetto

12 July 2024 15	Botafogo-SP	0–1	Amazonas	Ribeirão Preto
21:00 UTC−3			Cauan Barros 20'	Stadium: Estádio Santa Cruz; Referee: Anderson Ribeiro Goncalves

17 July 2024 9	CRB	4–1	Botafogo-SP	Ribeirão Preto
20:30 UTC−3	Hereda 20'; Kleiton 44'; Tormen (yellow card) 66' (yellow-red card) 80'; Ramon 73' (pen.); Labandeira 90+6'		Wallison 1'	Stadium: Estádio Santa Cruz; Referee: Hieger Tulio Cardoso

21 July 2024 16	Botafogo-SP	2–2	Brusuqe	Ribeirão Preto
18:30 UTC−3	Alex Sandro 8'; João Costa 71'		Mateus Pivô 56'; Cristovam 88'	Stadium: Estádio Santa Cruz; Attendance: 2,444; Referee: Luciano Da Silva Miranda Filho

25 July 2024 17	Ceará	4–1	Botafogo-SP	Fortaleza
21:30 UTC−3	Erick Pulga 22'; Saulo Mineiro 24'; Aylon 32'; Lourenço 55'		Alexandre de Jesus 43'	Stadium: Castelão; Referee: Bruno Mota Correia

30 July 2024 18	Avaí	v	Botafogo-SP	Florianópolis
21:00 UTC−3				Stadium: Estádio da Ressacada

=== Campeonato Paulista ===
Pos	Team	Pld	W	D	L	GF	GA	GD	Pts	Qualification
1	São Paulo	12	6	4	2	20	12	+8	22	Knockout stage
2	Novorizontino	12	6	4	2	16	10	+6	22	Knockout stage
3	São Bernardo	12	6	3	3	14	9	+5	21	
4	Botafogo-SP	12	3	3	6	8	16	−8	12	

Source: Soccerway

20 January 2024 1	Botafogo-SP	0–1	Santos

23 January 2024 2	Água Santa	0–1	Botafogo-SP

27 January 2024 3	Red Bull Bragantino	1–1	Botafogo-SP	Bragança Paulista
17:15 UTC−3				Stadium: Estádio Nabi Abi Chedid

1 February 2024 4	Botafogo-SP	1–0	Santo André
19:00 UTC−3

4 February 2024 5	Ituano	0–0	Botafogo-SP
18:00 UTC−3

7 February 2024 6	Botafogo-SP	0–3	Ponte Preta
19:00 UTC−3

11 February 2024 7	Inter de Limeira	2–0	Botafogo-SP
16:00 UTC−3

=== Copa do Brasil ===
20 February 2024 First round	Nova Venécia	1–2	Botafogo-SP	Águia Branca
20:00 UTC−3				Stadium: Estádio José Olímpio da Rocha

14 March 2024 Second round	Botafogo-SP	2–1	Anápolis	Ribeirão Preto
21:30 UTC−3				Stadium: Estádio Santa Cruz

2 May 2024 Third round First leg	Palmeiras	2–1	Botafogo-SP	São Paulo
21:30 UTC−3				Stadium: Allianz Parque

23 May 2024 Third round Second leg	Botafogo-SP	0–0 (1–2 agg.)	Palmeiras	Ribeirão Preto
19:00 UTC−3		Report		Stadium: Estádio Santa Cruz; Referee: Anderson Daronco
