= 2026 Avaí FC season =

Avaí FC
2026 season
- Manager: Cauan de Almeida (until 6 July); Allan Aal (from 9 July)
- Campeonato Brasileiro Série B: 16th
- Campeonato Catarinense: Quarter-finals
- Copa do Brasil: Third round
- Recopa Catarinense: Winners
- Copa Sul-Sudeste: Winners
- Top goalscorer: League: All: Daniel Penha (6)

The 2026 season is Avaí FC's fourth consecutive season in the Brazilian Campeonato Brasileiro Série B and the 103rd season in the club's history. On 6 July 2026, the club dismissed head coach Cauan de Almeida following a 3-1 defeat against Botafogo de Ribeirão Preto, which left the team in 18th place, 5 points away from the safety zone.

== Transfers ==
=== In ===
Pos.	Player	Transferred from	Fee	Date	Source
GK	(Brazil) Léo Aragão	(Brazil) Cruzeiro	Loan	3 January 2026	
MF	(Brazil) Daniel Penha	(Brazil) Atlético Mineiro B	Loan	9 January 2026	
MF	(Brazil) Luiz Henrique	(Brazil) Criciúma	Undisclosed	16 January 2026	
DF	(Brazil) Guilherme Aquino	(Brazil) Coritiba	Loan	20 January 2026	
FW	(Brazil) Walace França	(Brazil) Athletico Paranaense U20	Loan	20 January 2026	
MF	(Brazil) Paulo Vitor	(Brazil) Atlético Mineiro	Loan	23 January 2026	
FW	(Brazil) Rafael Bilú	(Brazil) Juventude	Free	30 January 2026	
DF	(Brazil) Wesley Gasolina	(Brazil) Athletic Club	Undisclosed	2 March 2026	
MF	(Brazil) Sorriso	(Brazil) Palmeiras	Loan	3 March 2026	
MF	(Brazil) Wenderson	(Sweden) IF Elfsborg	Loan	4 March 2026	
FW	(Brazil) Léo Gamalho	Unattached	Free	28 May 2026	
DF	(Brazil) Reynaldo	(Kuwait) Al-Arabi	Undisclosed	8 July 2026	
MF	(Brazil) Gabriel Cipriano	(Brazil) Amazonas	Undisclosed	23 July 2026	
GK	(Brazil) Bruno Ferreira	(Brazil) Ceará	Free	30 July 2026	
MF	(Brazil) Léo Chú	(Portugal) Alverca	Loan	4 August 2026	
FW	(Brazil) Felipe Vizeu	(Peru) Sporting Cristal	Free	6 August 2026	

=== Out ===
Pos.	Player	Transferred to	Fee	Date	Source
FW	(Brazil) Walace França	(Brazil) Athletico Paranaense U20	Loan return	30 June 2026	
GK	(Brazil) Léo Aragão	(Brazil) Cruzeiro	Loan return	1 July 2026	
FW	(Brazil) Rafael Bilú	(Thailand) Ratchaburi FC	Free	22 July 2026	
DF	(Brazil) Wesley Gasolina	(Portugal) Nacional	Undisclosed	22 July 2026	
MF	(Brazil) Sorriso	(Brazil) Palmeiras	Loan return	13 August 2026	

== Competitions ==
=== Overall record ===
Competition	First match	Last match	Starting round	Final position	Record							
Competition	First match	Last match	Starting round	Final position	Pld	W	D	L	GF	GA	GD	Win %
Campeonato Catarinense	7 January 2026	28 February 2026	Matchday 1	Quarter-finals; ACESC Cup	11	6	1	4	15	11	+4	54.55
Copa do Brasil	4 March 2026	10 March 2026	Second round	Third round	2	1	1	0	4	1	+3	50.00
Recopa Catarinense	15 March 2026		Matchday 1	Winners	1	1	0	0	4	0	+4	100.00
Campeonato Brasileiro Série B	22 March 2026		Matchday 1		24	8	5	11	27	30	−3	33.33
Copa Sul-Sudeste	25 March 2026	7 June 2026	Group stage	Winners	10	5	2	3	18	13	+5	50.00
Total					48	21	9	18	68	55	+13	43.75

Source: Competitions

=== Campeonato Catarinense ===
7 January 2026 1	Avaí	2–1	Barra
21:30

11 January 2026 2	Criciúma	2–1	Avaí
18:00

14 January 2026 3	Avaí	1–0	Carlos Renaux
21:30

18 January 2026 4	Figueirense	0–2	Avaí
18:00

21 January 2026 5	Avaí	1–1	Chapecoense
21:30

25 January 2026 6	Santa Catarina	3–1	Avaí
18:00

==== Quarter-finals ====
31 January 2026 First leg	Camboriú	1–2	Avaí
16:30

8 February 2026 Second leg	Avaí	0–1 (3–4 p)	Camboriú
18:30

==== ACESC Cup ====
14 February 2026 Quarter-finals; First leg	Santa Catarina	1–2	Avaí
18:00

21 February 2026 Quarter-finals; Second leg	Avaí	3–0	Santa Catarina
17:00

28 February 2026 Semi-finals	Camboriú	1–0	Avaí
16:30

=== Copa do Brasil ===
4 March 2026 Second round	Avaí	3–0	Porto Vitória
19:30

10 March 2026 Second round	Portuguesa	1–1 (4–1 p)	Avaí
19:00

=== Recopa Catarinense ===
15 March 2026 Final	Avaí	4–2	Figueirense
18:00

=== Campeonato Brasileiro Série B ===
Pos	Team	Pld	W	D	L	GF	GA	GD	Pts	Promotion or relegation
15	Ceará	28	8	8	12	29	36	−7	32	
16	Botafogo-SP	28	8	7	13	31	35	−4	31	
17	Avaí	28	8	6	14	29	36	−7	30	Relegation to 2027 Campeonato Brasileiro Série C
18	Londrina	28	7	7	14	38	39	−1	28	Relegation to 2027 Campeonato Brasileiro Série C
19	América Mineiro	28	4	5	19	21	48	−27	17	Relegation to 2027 Campeonato Brasileiro Série C

Updated to match(es) played on 15 September 2026. Source: CBF
Rules for classification: 1) points; 2) wins; 3) goal difference; 4) goals scored; 5) head-to-head results (only between 2 teams); 6) fewest red cards; 7) fewest yellow cards; 8) drawing of lots.

==== Matches ====
22 March 2026 1	Avaí	2–0	Juventude
16:00

1 April 2026 2	CRB	0–1	Avaí
21:30

5 April 2026 3	Avaí	0–0	Operário Ferroviário
16:00

11 April 2026 4	Sport	2–2	Avaí
18:00

18 April 2026 5	Avaí	1–2	Ponte Preta
21:30

26 April 2026 6	Atlético Goianiense	2–1	Avaí
18:00

3 May 2026 7	Avaí	3–3	Novorizontino
21:30

10 May 2026 8	Avaí	0–0	Fortaleza
18:30

17 May 2026 9	Vila Nova	2–0	Avaí
18:00

24 May 2026 10	Avaí	0–2	Goiás
19:00

30 May 2026 11	Avaí	1–2	Criciúma
16:00

10 June 2026 12	Ceará	2–1	Avaí
20:00

15 June 2026 13	Londrina	3–2	Avaí
21:00

21 June 2026 14	Avaí	1–0	Cuiabá
11:00

28 June 2026 15	Athletic	1–0	Avaí
16:00

6 July 2026 16	Botafogo-SP	3–1	Avaí
19:00

12 July 2026 17	Avaí	2–0	Náutico
16:00

17 July 2026 18	São Bernardo	1–1	Avaí
19:00

21 July 2026 19	Avaí	2–1	América Mineiro
19:30

28 July 2026 20	Juventude	1–0	Avaí
19:30

11 August 2026 21	Avaí	0–1	CRB
19:30

16 August 2026 22	Operário Ferroviário	1–2	Avaí
11:00

19 August 2026 23	Avaí	2–1	Sport
19:30

23 August 2026 24	Ponte Preta	0–2	Avaí
16:00

30 August 2026 25	Avaí	v	Atlético Goianiense	Florianópolis
16:00				Stadium: Estádio da Ressacada; Referee: Lucas Canetto Bellote

=== Copa Sul-Sudeste ===
==== Group stage ====
Group A

25 March 2026 1	Tombense	3–2	Avaí
20:00

29 March 2026 2	Avaí	2–2	Cianorte
18:15

8 April 2026 3	Chapecoense	2–1	Avaí
19:00

15 April 2026 4	Avaí	1–0	Caxias
21:30

29 April 2026 5	Novorizontino	1–2	Avaí
21:15

6 May 2026 6	Avaí	2–0	Sampaio Corrêa
21:30

==== Semi-finals ====
20 May 2026 First leg	Volta Redonda	2–2	Avaí
19:00

27 May 2026 Second leg	Avaí	3–0	Volta Redonda
19:00

==== Finals ====
4 June 2026 First leg	Avaí	3–0	Chapecoense
20:00

7 June 2026 Second leg	Chapecoense	3–0 (4–5 p)	Avaí
11:00
