= Wesley Gasolina =

Brazilian footballer (born 2000)

Personal information
- Full name: Wesley David de Oliveira Andrade
- Date of birth: 13 March 2000 (age 26)
- Place of birth: Retirolândia, Bahia, Brazil
- Height: 1.70 m (5 ft 7 in)
- Position: Right-back

Team information
- Current team: Nacional
- Number: 52

Youth career
- –2019: Flamengo
- 2019: Hellas Verona
- 2020: Juventus

Senior career*
Years	Team	Apps	(Gls)
2019–2020	Hellas Verona	0	(0)
2020–2022	Juventus	0	(0)
2020–2021	→ Juventus U23 (res.)	10	(0)
2021–2022	→ Sion (loan)	31	(4)
2022–2024	Cruzeiro	26	(1)
2025–2026	Athletic	27	(0)
2026	Avaí	12	(0)
2026–	Nacional	1	(0)

International career
2015	Brazil U15		
2017	Brazil U17	15	(1)
Medal record
Men's football
Representing Brazil
FIFA U-17 World Cup
Bronze medal – third place	2017 India
- * Club domestic league appearances and goals as of 10 August 2026

Wesley David de Oliveira Andrade (born 13 March 2000), known as Wesley Gasolina or simply Wesley, is a Brazilian professional footballer who plays as right-back for Portuguese club Nacional.

== Club career ==
=== Hellas Verona ===
On 2 September 2019, Wesley joined Serie A club Hellas Verona on a free transfer, after his contract with Flamengo had expired in April. He made only one appearance with the Primavera (under-19s) team.

=== Juventus ===
Wesley moved to Juventus on 30 January 2020. He played for their reserve team – Juventus U23 – in the Serie C, and made his debut during the 2019–20 season on 2 February 2020, in a 0–0 draw to Pontedera. Wesley also helped Juventus U23 win the Coppa Italia Serie C, coming on as a substitute in the final against Ternana on 27 June 2020, which his side won 2–1.

Wesley was first called up for Juventus on 12 February 2020, in a Coppa Italia semi-final game against AC Milan. On 13 January 2021, Wesley started his first game for Juventus in the Coppa Italia, beating Genoa 3–2 after extra time.

==== Loans to Sion ====
On 1 February 2021, Wesley was sent on loan to Swiss Super League side Sion until the end of the season. He made his debut on 3 February, in a 3–2 win against St. Gallen. Wesley scored his first professional goal four days later, helping his side draw 2–2 to Basel.

The loan was renewed for a further season on 31 August 2021.

=== Cruzeiro ===
On 8 August 2022, Wesley signed for Cruzeiro in the Brazilian Série B on a permanent deal. He helped his side finish the 2022 season in first place, thus gaining promotion to the Série A. In February 2023, Wesley suffered an ACL injury to his right knee, having made five appearances in the 2023 season before his injury. He returned to training in October 2023, and remained with Cruzeiro through 2024 before leaving when his contract expired. Wesley made 29 appearances for Cruzeiro, scoring one goal.

=== Athletic and Avaí ===
Wesley signed for Série B side Athetic ahead of the 2025 season. He played 32 games throughout the season.

Ahead of the 2026 season, Wesley joined Avaí in the Série B. He played 19 games, scoring once and providing one assist. He was also part of the squad that won the Copa Sul-Sudeste.

=== Nacional ===
In July 2026, Wesley joined Nacional in the Portuguese Primeira Liga on a two-year contract.

== International career ==
Wesley represented Brazil at under-15 level at the 2015 South American U-15 Championship, helping his side win the tournament. He also played for Brazil at under-17 level at the 2017 South American U-17 Championship, playing eight games, and helping Brazil win the tournament. He also played seven games at the 2017 FIFA U-17 World Cup, scoring a goal against England in the semi-finals; Brazil finished the tournament in third place.

== Style of play ==
Nicknamed "Gasolina" (Portuguese for "gasoline") for his pace, Wesley is a quick and dynamic attacking-minded right-back. He is also known for his dribbling and crossing abilities. Wesley has been likened to fellow Brazilian right-back Dani Alves for his characteristics.

== Career statistics ==
=== Club ===
As of match played 10 August 2026

Club	Season	League			State league		National cup (Note: Includes Coppa Italia, Swiss Cup, Copa do Brasil)		Continental		Other		Total	
Club	Season	Division	Apps	Goals	Apps	Goals	Apps	Goals	Apps	Goals	Apps	Goals	Apps	Goals
Hellas Verona	2019–20	Serie A	0	0	—		—		—		—		0	0
Juventus U23	2019–20	Serie C	3	0	—		—		—		3 (Note: Two appearances in Serie C promotion play-offs, one appearance in Coppa Italia Serie C)	0	6	0
Juventus U23	2020–21	Serie C	7	0	—		—		—		—		7	0
Juventus U23	Total		10	0	0	0	0	0	0	0	3	0	13	0
Juventus	2019–20	Serie A	0	0	—		0	0	0	0	—		0	0
Juventus	2020–21	Serie A	0	0	—		1	0	—		0	0	1	0
Juventus	Total		0	0	0	0	1	0	0	0	0	0	1	0
Sion (loan)	2020–21	Swiss Super League	6	1	—		1	0	—		0	0	7	1
Sion (loan)	2021–22	Swiss Super League	25	3	—		1	0	—		—		26	3
Sion (loan)	Total		31	4	0	0	2	0	0	0	0	0	33	4
Cruzeiro	2022	Série B	9	0	—		—		—		—		9	0
Cruzeiro	2023	Série A	0	0	5 (Note: Appearances in Campeonato Mineiro)	0	0	0	—		—		5	0
Cruzeiro	2024	Série A	4	0	8	1	1	0	2 (Note: Appearances in Copa Sudamericana)	0	—		15	1
Cruzeiro	Total		13	0	13	1	1	0	2	0	0	0	29	1
Athetic	2025	Série B	21	0	6	0	2	0	—		3 (Note: Appearances in Troféu Inconfidência)	0	32	0
Avaí	2026	Série B	12	0	0	0	0	0	—		7 (Note: Appearances in Copa Sul-Sudeste)	1	19	1
Nacional	2026–27	Primeira Liga	1	0	—		0	0	—		—		1	0
Career total			88	4	19	1	6	0	2	0	13	1	128	6

== Honours ==
Juventus U23

- Coppa Italia Serie C: 2019–20

Juventus

- Coppa Italia: 2020–21

Cruzeiro

- Campeonato Brasileiro Série B: 2022

Avaí

- Copa Sul-Sudeste: 2026

Brazil U15

- South American U-15 Championship: 2015

Brazil U17

- South American U-17 Championship: 2017
- FIFA U-17 World Cup third place: 2017
