= 2026 Campeonato Brasileiro Série B =

Football competition held in Brazil

Campeonato Brasileiro Série B
- Season: 2026
- Dates: 21 March – 28 November
- Champions: Novorizontino (1st title)
- Promoted: Juventude; Novorizontino
- Relegated: América Mineiro; Avaí; Londrina; Ponte Preta
- Matches: 382
- Goals: 895 (2.34 per match)
- Biggest home win: Vila Nova 6–0 Ponte Preta; R23, 19 August; Londrina 6–0 Ponte Preta; R28, 15 September
- Longest winning run: 6 games Criciúma
- Longest unbeaten run: 17 games Fortaleza
- Longest winless run: 22 games Ponte Preta
- Longest losing run: 8 games Ponte Preta
- All statistics correct as of 22 November 2026.

The 2026 Campeonato Brasileiro Série B is a football competition held in Brazil, equivalent to the second division. The competition began on 21 March and will end on 28 November.

Twenty teams competed in the tournament, twelve returning from the 2025 season, four promoted from the 2025 Campeonato Brasileiro Série C (Londrina, Náutico, Ponte Preta and São Bernardo), and four relegated from the 2025 Campeonato Brasileiro Série A (Juventude, Sport, Fortaleza, and Ceará).

== Teams ==
Twenty teams competed in the league – twelve teams from the previous season, as well as four teams promoted from the Série C, and four teams relegated from the Série A.

Location of teams in 2026 Série B

Pos.	Relegated from 2025 Série A
17th	Ceará
18th	Fortaleza
19th	Juventude
20th	Sport

Pos.	Promoted from 2025 Série C
1st	Ponte Preta
2nd	Londrina
3rd	Náutico
4th	São Bernardo

=== Number of teams by state ===
Number of teams	State	Team(s)
4	São Paulo	Botafogo-SP, Novorizontino, Ponte Preta and São Bernardo
3	Goiás	Atlético Goianiense, Goiás and Vila Nova
2	Ceará	Ceará and Fortaleza
2	Minas Gerais	América Mineiro and Athletic
2	Paraná	Londrina and Operário Ferroviário
2	Pernambuco	Náutico and Sport
2	Santa Catarina	Avaí and Criciúma
1	Alagoas	CRB
1	Mato Grosso	Cuiabá
1	Rio Grande do Sul	Juventude

=== Stadiums and locations ===
Team	Home city	State	Stadium	Capacity
América Mineiro	Belo Horizonte	Minas Gerais	Arena Independência	23,018
Athletic	São João del-Rei	Minas Gerais	Arena Sicredi	6,000
Atlético Goianiense	Goiânia	Goiás	Antônio Accioly	12,500
Avaí	Florianópolis	Santa Catarina	Ressacada	17,826
Botafogo-SP	Ribeirão Preto	São Paulo	Santa Cruz	29,292
Ceará	Fortaleza	Ceará	Castelão	57,876
CRB	Maceió	Alagoas	Rei Pelé	17,126
Criciúma	Criciúma	Santa Catarina	Heriberto Hülse	19,225
Cuiabá	Cuiabá	Mato Grosso	Arena Pantanal	44,000
Fortaleza	Fortaleza	Ceará	Castelão	57,876
Goiás	Goiânia	Goiás	Estádio da Serrinha	14,450
Juventude	Caxias do Sul	Rio Grande do Sul	Alfredo Jaconi	19,924
Londrina	Londrina	Paraná	Estádio do Café	31,000
Náutico	Recife	Pernambuco	Aflitos	22,856
Novorizontino	Novo Horizonte	São Paulo	Doutor Jorge Ismael de Biasi	16,000
Operário Ferroviário	Ponta Grossa	Paraná	Germano Krüger	10,632
Ponte Preta	Campinas	São Paulo	Moisés Lucarelli	19,728
São Bernardo	São Bernardo do Campo	São Paulo	1º de Maio	15,159
Sport	Recife	Pernambuco	Ilha do Retiro	32,983
Vila Nova	Goiânia	Goiás	Onésio Brasileiro Alvarenga	6,500

== Personnel and kits ==
On 25 September 2026, the Brazilian government announced a provisional measure banning online sportsbooks from operating in Brazil. As a result, several Série B football teams terminated their agreements with sportsbooks and, consequently, were left without main sponsors on their uniforms. The teams that had agreements with online sportsbooks were: América Mineiro (Betbra), Athletic (Betnacional), Atlético Goianiense (Blaze), Avaí (1pra1.Bet), Ceará (Esportes da Sorte), CRB (Bolsa de Aposta), Criciúma (Bolsa de Aposta), Goiás (Viva Sorte Bet), Náutico (Esportes da Sorte), Sport (Betnacional), and Vila Nova (Bet dá Sorte).

Team	Head coach	Captain	Kit manufacturer	Kit main sponsor	Other sponsors
América Mineiro	(Brazil) Moacir Júnior	(Brazil) Willian Bigode	Volt Sport	None	List: Front: Oficial Sport, Hospital na Residência, Bizz Internet, North Tecnologia; Back: Direcional, Proativa; Sleeves: Supermercados BH; Shorts: New Four, UniCesumar; Socks: None; Number: None
Athletic	(Brazil) Alex	(Brazil) Zeca	Kick Ball	Esquadrão 1909	List: Front: Conect@, Topps, MM Aluguel de Carros, Croques, Multimarcas Consórcios, Grupo Ascenário; Back: Visite São João del Rei; Sleeves: Sicredi, Construtora Conde de Aguiar; Shorts: Café Soberano, Dark Wolf Nutrition, Salgados Maxter Gourmet; Socks: Soccer Grass; Number: None
Atlético Goianiense	(Brazil) Roger Silva	(Brazil) Gustavo Coutinho	Dragão Premium (Note: Club manufactured kit)	IPM	List: Front: None; Back: Unimed, Câmara Municipal de Goiânia, Prefeitura de Goiânia, Governo de Goiás; Sleeves: Cristal Alimentos; Shorts: None; Socks: None; Number: LinQ Telecom
Avaí	(Brazil) Marquinhos (caretaker)	(Brazil) Zé Ricardo	Volt Sport	Ringgo	List: Front: WOA; Back: Grupo Dimas, Legacy Comex; Sleeves: Liderança; Shorts: UniCesumar; Socks: None; Number: None
Botafogo-SP	(Brazil) Cláudio Tencati	(Brazil) Patrick Brey	Volt Sport	None	List: Front: Nicnet, Quintal Shopping dos Pisos; Back: None; Sleeves: Sermed Saúde; Shorts: None; Socks: None; Number: None
Ceará	(Brazil) Anderson Batatais (caretaker)	(Brazil) Luiz Otávio	Diadora	None	List: Front: Banco Genial, Mercadão São Luiz; Back: Hidracor, Unimed; Sleeves: Prefeitura de Fortaleza, Governo do Estado do Ceará; Shorts: Normatel Home Center; Socks: None; Number: Voke
CRB	(Brazil) Fábio Matias	(Brazil) Fábio Alemão	Regatas	None	List: Front: GWM Cycosa, Lojas Guido; Back: Suporte Saúde, Coringa, Governo de Alagoas, Prefeitura de Maceió, GWM Cycosa; Sleeves: None; Shorts: Telesil, UniCesumar, Prevencor, Cooperativa Pindorama, Alagoas Energia; Socks: None; Number: QualiCoco
Criciúma	(Brazil) Umberto Louzer	(Brazil) Rodrigo	Volt Sport	Hipper Freios	List: Front: Alfamaq Equipamentos, GWM Tozzo, Sicredi; Back: Cristalcopo, Brametal, Budny Tratores; Sleeves: Anjo Tintas; Shorts: Embrasil, Baldissera Empreendimentos; Socks: None; Number: Unimed
Cuiabá	(Brazil) Eduardo Barros	(Brazil) Raul	Kappa	Dourado	List: Front: Sicredi, Agro Amazônia; Back: Sicredi, Conheça Mato Grosso; Sleeves: None; Shorts: Conheça Mato Grosso; Socks: None; Number: None
Fortaleza	(Argentina) Juan Pablo Vojvoda	(Brazil) Lucas Sasha	Volt Sport	Santana Textiles	List: Front: Mercadão São Luiz, Banco Inter, Governo do Estado do Ceará; Back: Ingresse, Unimed; Sleeves: Prefeitura de Fortaleza, Fechados Até o Fim; Shorts: Normatel Home Center, UniCesumar, Hantec Markets; Socks: Consórcio Tradição; Number: Ftrade Brasil
Goiás	(Brazil) Mozart	(Brazil) Tadeu	Diadora	None	List: Front: Viva Sorte, Câmara Municipal de Goiânia, Prefeitura de Goiânia, Governo de Goiás; Back: Italac, ADGM Sports,Unimed; Sleeves: Cristal Alimentos; Shorts: None; Socks: Vedacil; Number: None
Juventude	(Brazil) Maurício Barbieri	(Brazil) Alan Ruschel	19treze	None	List: Front: None; Back: RodOil, Humana Saúde; Sleeves: None; Shorts: UniCesumar; Socks: None; Number: None
Londrina	(Brazil) Hugo Chacon (caretaker)	(Brazil) Wallace	Athleta	None	List: Front: Sicoob Ouro Verde, Rolemar; Back: Costa Rica Malhas, Pado, Unimed; Sleeves: Super Muffato; Shorts: UniCesumar, Clinoage; Socks: None; Number: None
Náutico	(Brazil) Bruno Pivetti	(Brazil) Jean Carlos	Reebok	None	List: Front: TopField, Super Cimed; Back: Prefeitura do Recife; Sleeves: Real Hospital Português; Shorts: Lideri Telecom, Dragão; Socks: Ovos São Luis; Number: None
Novorizontino	(Brazil) Enderson Moreira	(Brazil) Robson	Physicus	StoneX	List: Front: Açúcar Santa Isabel, Grupo ENG, Fass Agro; Back: Maturatta Friboi, Physicus, DS Tecnologia Automotiva; Sleeves: Kodilar Alimentos; Shorts: Guaraná Poty; Socks: Kodilar Alimentos; Number: Oquei Telecom
Operário Ferroviário	(Brazil) Alberto Valentim	(Brazil) Gabriel Boschilia	Karilu	Espaço Smart	List: Front: GMAD, Philips Áudio e Vídeo; Back: Sicredi, Proadec, Makita; Sleeves: Águia Sistemas, Guararapes, Embrasil, Aiwa, Midea Group; Shorts: Keima Um Lojão, FatalFans, Rendicolla; Socks: FatalFans; Number: Espaço Smart
Ponte Preta	(Brazil) Gilson Kleina	(Brazil) Élvis	Diadora	Crear Empreendimentos	List: Front: Única Saúde, Pavinc, Melo Brasio Holding; Back: Day Pharma; Sleeves: None; Shorts: Única Saúde, Guaraná Poty; Socks: None; Number: None
São Bernardo	(Brazil) Vinícius Bergantin	(Brazil) Foguinho	Junpe	Magnum SCD	List: Front: Amao Nutrition; Back: Champion Relógios; Sleeves: None; Shorts: Magnum SCD; Socks: None; Number: None
Sport	(Argentina) Mariano Soso	(Brazil) Marcelo Benevenuto	Kappa	Moura Dubeux	List: Front: Mood; Back: UniCesumar, Zé Delivery, BaladAPP; Sleeves: None; Shorts: Real Hospital Português; Socks: None; Number: None
Vila Nova	(Brazil) Guto Ferreira	(Brazil) Marquinhos Gabriel	Volt Sport	BYD Saga	List: Front: Cash Cash, Ingresso SA, Tintas Luztol, Câmara Municipal de Goiânia, Prefeitura de Goiânia, AUVP, Governo de Goiás; Back: BCJ, Oficial Sport, Unimed; Sleeves: Cristal Alimentos, Milky Moo, Fokus; Shorts: UniCesumar, Grupo F8, Fórmula Distribuidora; Socks: None; Number: FatalFans

=== Coaching changes ===
Team	Outgoing head coach	Manner of departure	Date of vacancy	Position in table	Incoming head coach	Date of appointment	Ref
Botafogo-SP	(Brazil) Ivan Izzo	End of caretaker spell	23 November 2025	Pre-season	(Brazil) Cláudio Tencati	24 November 2025	
Avaí	(Brazil) Vinícius Bergantin	End of contract	28 November 2025	Pre-season	(Brazil) Cauan de Almeida	2 December 2025	
Juventude	(Brazil) Thiago Carpini	End of contract	7 December 2025	Pre-season	(Brazil) Maurício Barbieri	11 December 2025	
Sport	(Brazil) César Lucena	End of caretaker spell	7 December 2025	Pre-season	(Brazil) Roger Silva	21 December 2025	
Goiás	(Brazil) Fábio Carille	Mutual agreement	8 December 2025	Pre-season	(Brazil) Daniel Paulista	9 December 2025	
Ceará	(Brazil) Léo Condé	End of contract	10 December 2025	Pre-season	(Brazil) Mozart	12 December 2025	
Fortaleza	(Argentina) Martín Palermo	End of contract	11 December 2025	Pre-season	(Brazil) Thiago Carpini	11 December 2025	
Londrina	(Brazil) Roger Silva	Signed by Sport	21 December 2025	Pre-season	(Brazil) Allan Aal	30 December 2025	
Operário Ferroviário	(Brazil) Alex	Sacked	18 January 2026	State leagues	(Brazil) Luizinho Lopes (Note: Schumacher was the caretaker head coach in a Campeonato Paranaense match against FC Cascavel on 21 January.)	20 January 2026	
Ponte Preta	(Brazil) Marcelo Fernandes	Mutual agreement	15 February 2026	State leagues	(Brazil) Rodrigo Santana	22 February 2026	
Athletic	(Portugal) Rui Duarte	Mutual agreement	17 February 2026	State leagues	(Brazil) Alex	21 February 2026	
Atlético Goianiense	(Brazil) Rafael Lacerda	Sacked	7 March 2026	State leagues	(Brazil) Eduardo Souza	10 March 2026	
Vila Nova	(Brazil) Umberto Louzer	Sacked	18 March 2026	State leagues	(Brazil) Ariel Mamede (caretaker)	18 March 2026	
Vila Nova	(Brazil) Ariel Mamede (caretaker)	End of caretaker spell	22 March 2026	9th	(Brazil) Guto Ferreira	22 March 2026	
Sport	(Brazil) Roger Silva	Sacked	23 March 2026	13th	(Brazil) Márcio Goiano (Note: Originally as caretaker head coach, appointed on a permanent basis on 16 April 2026.)	23 March 2026	
América Mineiro	(Brazil) Alberto Valentim	Sacked	12 April 2026	19th	(Brazil) Roger Silva	13 April 2026	
Londrina	(Brazil) Allan Aal	Sacked	4 May 2026	19th	(Brazil) Rogério Micale	8 May 2026	
Ponte Preta	(Brazil) Rodrigo Santana	Resigned	26 May 2026	19th	(Brazil) Édson Boaro (caretaker)	28 May 2026	
América Mineiro	(Brazil) Roger Silva	Mutual agreement	29 May 2026	20th	(Brazil) Umberto Louzer	31 May 2026	
Ceará	(Brazil) Mozart	Sacked	31 May 2026	13th	(Brazil) Anderson Batatais (caretaker)	5 June 2026	
Ponte Preta	(Brazil) Édson Boaro	End of caretaker spell	11 June 2026	19th	(Brazil) Márcio Zanardi	11 June 2026	
Atlético Goianiense	(Brazil) Eduardo Souza	Mutual agreement	14 June 2026	12th	(Brazil) Renan Brito (caretaker)	16 June 2026	
Goiás	(Brazil) Daniel Paulista	Sacked	24 June 2026	12th	(Brazil) Mozart	25 June 2026	
Ceará	(Brazil) Anderson Batatais	End of caretaker spell	25 June 2026	14th	(Brazil) Daniel Paulista	25 June 2026	
Sport	(Brazil) Márcio Goiano	Sacked	29 June 2026	8th	(Brazil) Gilmar Dal Pozzo	30 June 2026	
CRB	(Brazil) Eduardo Barroca	Sacked	4 July 2026	14th	(Brazil) Fábio Matias	5 July 2026	
Avaí	(Brazil) Cauan de Almeida	Sacked	6 July 2026	18th	(Brazil) Allan Aal	9 July 2026	
Atlético Goianiense	(Brazil) Renan Brito	End of caretaker spell	7 July 2026	13th	(Brazil) Roger Silva	7 July 2026	
Fortaleza	(Brazil) Thiago Carpini	Sacked	23 July 2026	5th	(Brazil) Reinan Santos (caretaker)	23 July 2026	
Fortaleza	(Brazil) Reinan Santos	End of caretaker spell	24 July 2026	6th	(Brazil) Paulo Autuori	24 July 2026	
São Bernardo	(Brazil) Ricardo Catalá	Mutual consent	28 July 2026	12th	(Brazil) Vinícius Bergantin	30 July 2026	
América Mineiro	(Brazil) Umberto Louzer	Sacked	22 August 2026	19th	(Brazil) Douglas Leite (caretaker)	23 August 2026	
Ponte Preta	(Brazil) Márcio Zanardi	Resigned	26 August 2026	20th	(Brazil) Gilson Kleina	27 August 2026	
Sport	(Brazil) Gilmar Dal Pozzo	Sacked	6 September 2026	8th	(Argentina) Mariano Soso	8 September 2026	
Criciúma	(Brazil) Eduardo Baptista	Signed by Internacional	23 September 2026	6th	(Brazil) Umberto Louzer	23 September 2026	
Náutico	(Brazil) Hélio dos Anjos & (Brazil) Guilherme dos Anjos	Sacked	23 September 2026	14th	(Brazil) Bruno Pivetti	25 September 2026	
Avaí	(Brazil) Allan Aal	Sacked	27 September 2026	17th	(Brazil) Marquinhos (caretaker)	28 September 2026	
América Mineiro	(Brazil) Douglas Leite	End of caretaker spell	6 October 2026	19th	(Brazil) Moacir Júnior (Note: João Victor Bonfatti was the caretaker head coach in the 32nd round match against Fortaleza on 7 October.)	6 October 2026	
Operário Ferroviário	(Brazil) Luizinho Lopes	Sacked	7 October 2026	9th	(Brazil) Alberto Valentim	8 October 2026	
Londrina	(Brazil) Rogério Micale	Sacked	10 October 2026	18th	(Brazil) Hugo Chacon (caretaker)	11 October 2026	
Fortaleza	(Brazil) Paulo Autuori	Sacked	8 November 2026	5th	(Argentina) Juan Pablo Vojvoda	10 November 2026	
Ceará	(Brazil) Daniel Paulista	Resigned	8 November 2026	16th	(Brazil) Anderson Batatais (caretaker)	9 November 2026	

== League table ==
Pos	Team	Pld	W	D	L	GF	GA	GD	Pts	Promotion or relegation
1	Novorizontino (C, P)	38	21	10	7	67	32	+35	73	Promotion to 2027 Campeonato Brasileiro Série A
2	Juventude (P)	38	20	11	7	51	26	+25	71	Promotion to 2027 Campeonato Brasileiro Série A
3	Vila Nova	38	19	9	10	53	39	+14	66	Advance to the promotion play-offs
4	Fortaleza	38	17	14	7	45	33	+12	65	Advance to the promotion play-offs
5	Criciúma	38	18	8	12	38	32	+6	62	Advance to the promotion play-offs
6	Atlético Goianiense	38	16	13	9	46	35	+11	61	Advance to the promotion play-offs
7	CRB	38	17	8	13	58	52	+6	59	
8	Goiás	38	17	7	14	39	44	−5	58	
9	Sport	38	15	13	10	53	42	+11	58	
10	Operário Ferroviário	38	16	9	13	51	50	+1	57	
11	São Bernardo	38	14	11	13	54	44	+10	53	
12	Botafogo-SP	38	14	9	15	45	41	+4	51	
13	Athletic	38	11	15	12	46	46	0	48	
14	Cuiabá	38	11	14	13	34	33	+1	47	
15	Náutico	38	12	10	16	41	51	−10	46	
16	Ceará	38	11	11	16	39	48	−9	44	
17	Avaí (R)	38	12	7	19	37	47	−10	43	Relegation to 2027 Campeonato Brasileiro Série C
18	Londrina (R)	38	9	8	21	47	59	−12	35	Relegation to 2027 Campeonato Brasileiro Série C
19	América Mineiro (R)	38	8	5	25	27	57	−30	29	Relegation to 2027 Campeonato Brasileiro Série C
20	Ponte Preta (R)	38	3	6	29	21	81	−60	15	Relegation to 2027 Campeonato Brasileiro Série C

Source: CBF
Rules for classification: 1) points; 2) wins; 3) goal difference; 4) goals scored; 5) head-to-head results (only between 2 teams); 6) fewest red cards; 7) fewest yellow cards; 8) drawing of lots.
(C) Champions; (P) Promoted; (R) Relegated

== Positions by round ==
The table lists the positions of teams after each week of matches. In order to preserve chronological evolvements, any postponed matches were not included to the round at which they were originally scheduled, but added to the full round they were played immediately afterwards.

Team ╲ Round	1	2	3	4	5	6	7	8	9	10	11	12	13	14	15	16	17	18	19	20	21	22	23	24	25	26	27	28	29	30	31	32	33	34	35	36	37	38
América Mineiro	17	20	18	20	20	20	20	20	20	20	20	20	20	20	20	20	20	20	20	19	19	19	19	19	19	19	19	19	19	19	19	19	19	19	19	19	19	19
Athletic	5	6	8	3	6	13	13	13	14	10	9	9	11	11	9	11	12	12	11	11	11	8	9	10	13	11	12	10	13	13	14	15	13	14	14	14	14	13
Atlético Goianiense	15	19	20	16	17	14	14	10	11	14	14	13	13	13	11	13	10	10	8	7	9	11	10	9	7	8	7	6	7	6	6	6	6	6	8	9	8	6
Avaí	4	2	2	2	5	12	12	12	15	15	17	17	18	18	18	18	18	18	17	18	18	17	16	16	16	17	17	17	17	17	17	17	17	17	17	17	17	17
Botafogo-SP	1	1	4	9	8	10	10	15	17	17	16	16	16	15	16	14	14	15	14	15	13	13	14	14	15	15	15	16	16	16	16	16	16	13	12	12	12	12
Ceará	11	10	6	1	3	6	9	14	9	11	13	12	14	14	15	17	17	17	18	16	16	16	17	17	17	16	16	15	15	15	15	14	15	16	16	16	16	16
CRB	8	15	14	18	19	19	18	17	13	8	12	15	15	16	14	15	15	13	12	8	7	9	6	7	6	6	8	7	8	7	7	7	7	7	6	6	6	7
Criciúma	7	7	12	7	10	4	6	7	8	9	8	6	6	5	3	3	1	1	1	1	1	1	1	2	3	2	5	5	6	5	4	5	5	5	5	4	4	5
Cuiabá	12	12	16	17	15	17	15	16	16	16	15	14	10	10	13	10	11	11	15	14	15	14	12	12	11	13	10	11	10	10	10	10	11	11	13	13	13	14
Fortaleza	20	18	13	8	2	2	1	3	5	5	5	4	4	8	7	4	6	5	5	4	3	4	5	5	5	5	4	4	2	3	5	4	4	4	4	5	5	4
Goiás	3	5	1	6	12	16	17	11	6	6	6	10	12	12	10	9	9	7	7	9	8	10	11	11	10	12	13	12	11	11	12	11	9	9	9	7	7	8
Juventude	19	17	19	15	11	5	7	9	10	12	10	11	8	6	5	6	5	2	4	2	2	2	2	1	1	1	1	2	4	2	2	1	3	3	2	2	2	2
Londrina	2	4	10	13	16	18	19	19	18	18	18	18	17	17	17	16	16	16	16	17	17	18	18	18	18	18	18	18	18	18	18	18	18	18	18	18	18	18
Náutico	16	8	5	10	14	8	8	4	2	2	4	7	7	9	12	12	13	14	13	13	14	15	15	15	12	10	11	14	14	14	13	13	14	15	15	15	15	15
Novorizontino	18	16	15	12	4	11	11	6	7	7	7	5	5	4	2	2	4	6	6	6	6	7	4	4	4	3	2	1	3	4	3	3	2	2	1	1	1	1
Operário Ferroviário	6	3	3	5	7	9	5	8	12	13	11	8	9	7	6	5	3	3	2	3	4	5	7	8	9	7	6	8	5	8	8	9	10	10	10	11	10	10
Ponte Preta	14	14	17	19	18	15	16	18	19	19	19	19	19	19	19	19	19	19	19	20	20	20	20	20	20	20	20	20	20	20	20	20	20	20	20	20	20	20
São Bernardo	10	13	11	14	9	3	2	1	1	1	3	2	1	2	4	7	7	8	10	12	12	12	13	13	14	14	14	13	12	12	11	12	12	12	11	10	11	11
Sport	13	11	9	11	13	7	3	2	3	3	1	3	3	3	8	8	8	9	9	10	10	6	8	6	8	9	9	9	9	9	9	8	8	8	7	8	9	9
Vila Nova	9	9	7	4	1	1	4	5	4	4	2	1	2	1	1	1	2	4	3	5	5	3	3	3	2	4	3	3	1	1	1	2	1	1	3	3	3	3

Champions, promoted to Campeonato Brasileiro Série A
Promotion to Campeonato Brasileiro Série A
Advance to the promotion play-offs
Relegation to Campeonato Brasileiro Série C

Source: CBF

== Results ==
Home \ Away	AME	ATH	ACG	AVA	BSP	CEA	CRB	CRI	CUI	FOR	GOI	JUV	LON	NAU	NOV	OPE	PON	SBE	SPO	VIL
América Mineiro		1–3	1–2	0–2	1–2	1–1	1–2	0–1	1–0	0–1	1–0	0–1	1–1	2–1	0–3	1–0	2–0	0–2	0–0	1–2
Athletic	1–1		2–3	1–0	1–1	2–1	0–2	2–0	0–0	1–0	1–1	1–1	2–2	0–1	1–4	0–1	2–1	2–1	1–2	5–0
Atlético Goianiense	2–0	0–0		2–1	3–0	2–1	3–3	4–0	1–0	1–0	1–1	0–0	2–1	1–2	0–1	3–1	2–0	0–1	1–1	0–2
Avaí	2–1	0–0	0–1		0–2	0–1	0–1	1–2	1–0	0–0	0–2	2–0	2–1	2–0	3–3	0–0	1–2	2–1	2–1	1–1
Botafogo-SP	2–1	1–2	1–1	3–1		1–0	0–1	1–1	1–2	4–0	1–3	4–2	4–0	1–1	1–3	2–1	2–0	1–2	1–1	0–1
Ceará	0–1	0–0	0–1	2–1	0–1		0–1	1–0	1–3	2–1	0–2	2–2	2–1	1–0	2–1	1–2	2–0	1–1	2–1	3–3
CRB	3–1	2–3	3–1	0–1	0–1	1–1		2–1	3–0	1–1	2–2	0–1	2–1	2–1	0–0	3–0	4–2	2–3	2–1	2–0
Criciúma	1–0	1–1	1–1	3–0	1–0	1–1	3–1		2–0	0–2	1–0	0–2	1–0	0–0	0–1	0–2	2–0	1–0	1–0	2–0
Cuiabá	1–0	3–0	0–1	0–1	1–1	0–2	2–0	1–1		1–1	1–1	1–2	2–2	3–0	0–0	1–0	2–0	1–2	0–0	1–0
Fortaleza	0–3	2–2	0–0	1–0	1–0	1–1	2–2	3–2	0–0		4–1	2–1	3–0	1–1	1–0	1–1	2–0	1–1	2–1	1–0
Goiás	3–1	2–1	0–1	2–1	1–0	2–0	2–1	1–0	0–2	0–1		0–1	1–0	0–0	0–4	0–3	1–0	2–1	1–1	1–0
Juventude	3–0	0–2	2–2	1–0	2–0	2–0	2–1	0–0	2–0	0–0	2–0		1–0	4–0	0–0	3–0	3–0	2–2	0–1	1–0
Londrina	1–3	2–0	0–0	3–2	0–0	0–0	5–0	0–2	1–0	1–2	2–2	0–0		2–1	1–4	1–2	6–0	1–3	1–2	0–1
Náutico	4–0	2–1	1–1	1–0	1–0	1–0	0–3	0–1	1–0	0–1	0–1	0–0	2–1		0–2	3–3	1–0	0–3	3–1	0–2
Novorizontino	3–0	2–1	3–0	3–1	1–0	2–1	1–1	0–1	1–1	2–1	3–0	0–1	1–3	2–2		2–1	5–1	0–0	2–1	2–1
Operário Ferroviário	1–0	1–0	1–0	1–2	1–2	2–2	3–0	1–1	0–0	0–0	0–2	2–1	3–0	2–6	2–1		3–2	1–3	3–2	0–0
Ponte Preta	1–0	1–1	1–1	0–2	0–0	1–1	1–0	1–2	1–2	2–2	1–2	0–2	1–4	1–1	0–2	0–2		0–2	1–3	0–1
São Bernardo	1–1	2–2	1–0	1–1	0–1	3–4	3–1	0–1	2–2	0–1	1–0	0–1	1–2	1–1	1–1	1–2	3–0		0–0	3–2
Sport	3–0	1–1	1–1	2–2	3–3	2–0	1–2	2–1	1–1	0–2	3–0	2–1	2–1	2–0	1–0	2–2	2–0	2–1		1–1
Vila Nova	1–0	1–1	2–1	2–0	1–0	2–0	2–2	1–0	0–0	2–1	2–0	2–2	2–0	4–3	2–2	2–1	6–0	2–1	0–1	

Source: CBF
Legend: Blue = home team win; Yellow = draw; Red = away team win.

== Promotion play-offs ==
The play-offs will be played on a home-and-away two-legged basis, with the higher-seeded team hosting the second leg. If tied on aggregate, the higher-seeded team will be promoted to the 2027 Campeonato Brasileiro Série A.

Team 1	Agg.	Team 2	1st leg	2nd leg
Atlético Goianiense (Goiás)	Group A	(Goiás) Vila Nova	1–1	–
Criciúma (Santa Catarina (state))	Group B	(Ceará) Fortaleza	1–0	–

=== Group A ===
22 November 2026
18:30

Atlético Goianiense (Goiás)	1–1	(Goiás) Vila Nova
Peixoto 5'	Report	Tiago Pagnussat 72'

Estádio Antônio Accioly, Goiânia
Referee: Flávio Rodrigues de Souza (São Paulo)

27 November 2026
20:00

Vila Nova (Goiás)	–	(Goiás) Atlético Goianiense
	Report

Estádio Onésio Brasileiro Alvarenga, Goiânia

=== Group B ===
22 November 2026
16:00

Criciúma (Santa Catarina (state))	1–0	(Ceará) Fortaleza
Marcelo Hermes 53'	Report

Estádio Heriberto Hülse, Criciúma
Referee: Rafael Rodrigo Klein (Rio Grande do Sul)

28 November 2026
20:00

Fortaleza (Ceará)	–	(Santa Catarina (state)) Criciúma
	Report

Castelão, Fortaleza
