= Léo Aragão =

Brazilian footballer (born 2002)

Personal information
- Full name: Leonardo de Aragão Carvalho
- Date of birth: 19 April 2002 (age 24)
- Place of birth: Americana, Brazil
- Height: 1.92 m (6 ft 4 in)
- Position: Goalkeeper

Team information
- Current team: Avaí
- Number: 41

Youth career
- 2013–2015: Rio Branco-SP
- 2016–2020: Red Bull Brasil
- 2020–2021: Red Bull Bragantino

Senior career*
Years	Team	Apps	(Gls)
2021–2023	Red Bull Bragantino II	22	(0)
2022	→ Caldense (loan)	9	(0)
2023	→ Ituano (loan)	0	(0)
2024–2025	Cruzeiro	5	(0)
2026–	→ Avaí (loan)	8	(0)
- * Club domestic league appearances and goals as of 15 April 2026

Leonardo de Aragão Carvalho (born 19 April 2002), known as Léo Aragão, is a Brazilian professional footballer who plays as a goalkeeper for Avaí, on loan from Cruzeiro.

== Career ==
Born in Americana, São Paulo, Léo Aragão began his career in the youth sector of hometown side Rio Branco. Later he also played in the youth divisions of Red Bull Brasil, moving to Red Bull Bragantino when it was acquired by the holding company.

Professionally, Léo Aragão represented Red Bull Bragantino II, Caldense in the 2022 Campeonato Brasileiro Série D, and Ituano, where he remained as a reserve for Jefferson Paulino without playing. On 28 December 2023, he joined Cruzeiro.

On 9 September 2024, despite being only a backup option, Léo Aragão renewed his contract with Cruzeiro.

== Personal life ==
Léo Aragão is majoring in economics, in addition to being fluent in Libras (Brazilian Sign Language), to communicate with a deaf and mute uncle.

== Honours ==
Avaí

- Recopa Catarinense: 2026
- Copa Sul-Sudeste: 2026
