= Cauan de Almeida =

Brazilian football coach

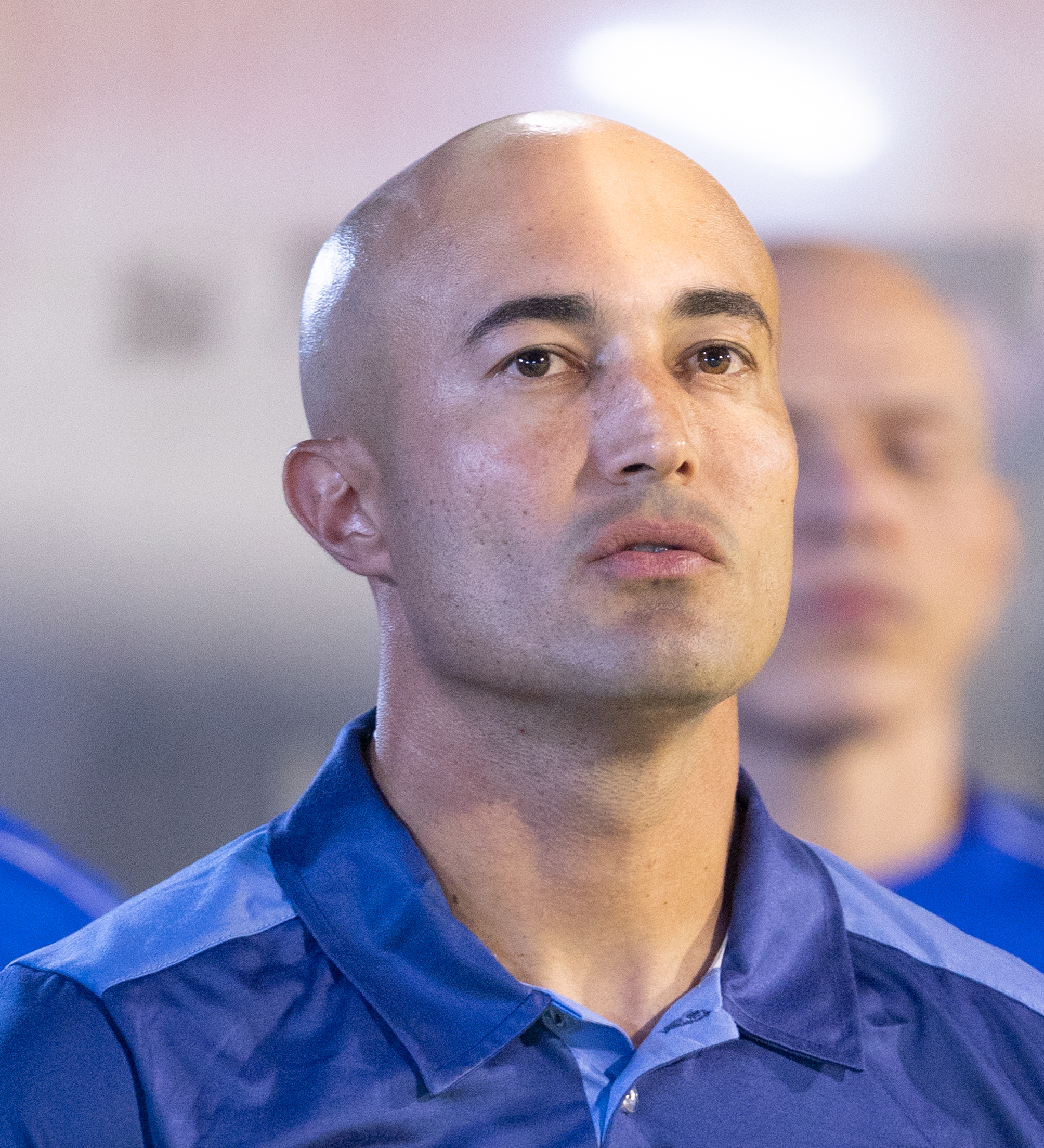
- Cauan de Almeida as head coach of Avaí in 2026

Personal information
- Full name: Cauan Felipe de Almeida
- Date of birth: 8 February 1989 (age 37)
- Place of birth: São Bernardo do Campo, Brazil
- Position: Midfielder

Youth career
- Years: Team
- 2005–2007: Comercial BH
- 2008: Vera Cruz-MG

Managerial career
- 2012: Betim U17
- 2013: AMDH U17
- 2014–2016: Infesta (assistant)
- 2016: AMDH U17
- 2017: Betinense (assistant)
- 2017–2019: América Mineiro U17
- 2019–2021: América Mineiro (assistant)
- 2020: América Mineiro (interim)
- 2021: América Mineiro (interim)
- 2021: Vasco da Gama (assistant)
- 2022–2023: Internacional (assistant)
- 2022: Internacional (interim)
- 2023: Corinthians (assistant)
- 2024: América Mineiro
- 2025: Portuguesa
- 2026: Avaí

Cauan Felipe de Almeida (born 8 February 1989) is a Brazilian football coach.

== Career ==
Born in São Bernardo do Campo, São Paulo, Cauan de Almeida began his career as a coach of the under-17 team of Betim. After working as a coach of the same category at Associação Mineira de Desenvolvimento Humano, he moved to Portugal in 2014, and was an assistant coach at F.C. Infesta.

Cauan de Almeida returned to Brazil in 2016, and moved back to AMDH's under-17 side. He was subsequently an assistant coach of Betinense before being named coach of the under-17 team of América Mineiro in 2017.

On 15 July 2019, after Felipe Conceição was named manager of América's first team, Cauan de Almeida was named his assistant. The following January, after Conceição left for Red Bull Bragantino, Cauan was named interim manager.

Cauan de Almeida was in charge of the club for two Campeonato Mineiro matches (two wins) before returning to his previous role after the appointment of Lisca; during the campaign, he also replaced Lisca on several opportunities due to the manager's suspension or illnesses. On 15 June, he was again interim after Lisca resigned.

On 27 July 2021, Cauan de Almeida moved to Vasco da Gama, again to work as Lisca's assistant. He became the permanent assistant coach of Internacional the following 7 January, before becoming the interim head coach of the latter side on 15 April 2022, after Alexander Medina was sacked.

Cauan de Almeida returned to his previous role after the appointment of Mano Menezes, and left Inter on 29 September 2023 to join his staff at Corinthians. On 18 December, he left the latter to return to América, now as a head coach of the first team.

Cauan de Almeida was sacked by Coelho on 27 August 2024, after a poor run of form. On 13 November, he was announced as head coach of Portuguesa for the upcoming season.

On 15 August 2025, Cauan de Almeida was dismissed by Lusa after their elimination from the Série D. On 2 December, he returned to the second division after being named at the helm of Avaí.

On 6 July 2026, with Avaí in the relegation zone of the Série B, Cauan de Almeida was sacked.

== Managerial statistics ==
As of 7 July 2026

Managerial record by team and tenure
Team	Nat.	From	To	Record								Ref
Team	Nat.	From	To	G	W	D	L	GF	GA	GD	Win %	Ref
América Mineiro (interim)	(Brazil)	26 January 2020	1 February 2020	2	2	0	0	4	0	+4	100.00	
América Mineiro (interim) (Note: Interim head coach as Lisca was suspended)	(Brazil)	9 September 2020	9 September 2020	1	1	0	0	1	0	+1	100.00	
América Mineiro (interim) (Note: Interim head coach as Lisca was suspended and later sidelined due to an illness)	(Brazil)	14 November 2020	21 November 2020	2	1	1	0	1	0	+1	50.00	
América Mineiro (interim)	(Brazil)	5 December 2020	8 December 2020	2	2	0	0	3	1	+2	100.00	
América Mineiro (interim)	(Brazil)	18 March 2021	18 March 2021	1	1	0	0	1	0	+1	100.00	
América Mineiro (interim)	(Brazil)	14 April 2021	14 April 2021	1	0	1	0	1	1	+0	0.00	
América Mineiro (interim)	(Brazil)	9 May 2021	9 May 2021	1	1	0	0	3	1	+2	100.00	
América Mineiro (interim)	(Brazil)	15 June 2021	20 June 2021	2	0	1	1	1	2	−1	0.00	
Internacional (interim)	(Brazil)	15 April 2022	19 April 2022	1	1	0	0	2	1	+1	100.00	
América Mineiro	(Brazil)	18 December 2023	27 August 2024	34	14	14	6	47	26	+21	41.18	
Portuguesa	(Brazil)	2 December 2024	15 August 2025	28	11	11	6	38	31	+7	39.29	
Avaí	(Brazil)	2 December 2025	6 July 2026	38	15	8	15	53	48	+5	39.47	
Career total				113	49	36	28	155	111	+44	43.36	—

== Honours ==
Avaí

- Recopa Catarinense: 2026
- Copa Sul-Sudeste: 2026
