= 2025 Associação Atlética Ponte Preta season =

Ponte Preta
2025 season
- Manager: Alberto Valentim (until 11 August); Marcelo Fernandes (from 12 August)
- Stadium: Estádio Moisés Lucarelli
- Campeonato Brasileiro Série C First stage: 2nd
- Campeonato Brasileiro Série C Second stage: 1st Winners
- Campeonato Paulista: First stage
- Copa do Brasil: First round

The 2025 season was the 126th in the history of Associação Atlética Ponte Preta, in which the club competed in the Campeonato Paulista and the Copa do Brasil, and will play in the Campeonato Brasileiro Série C, the third division of Brazilian football, for the first time since 1990.

== Transfers ==
=== In ===
Pos.	Player	Transferred to	Fee	Date	Source
FW	(Brazil) Jonas Toró	(Brazil) Botafogo-SP	Loan	3 April 2025	
DF	(Brazil) Wanderson	(Brazil) CSA	Undisclosed	9 April 2025	

== Competitions ==
=== Overall record ===
Competition	First match	Last match	Starting round	Final position	Record							
Competition	First match	Last match	Starting round	Final position	Pld	W	D	L	GF	GA	GD	Win %
Série C	12 April 2025		Matchday 1		6	4	1	1	8	6	+2	66.67
Campeonato Paulista	15 January 2025	23 February 2025	First stage	First stage	12	6	4	2	12	8	+4	50.00
Copa do Brasil	26 February 2025		First round	First round	1	0	0	1	1	2	−1	0.00
Total					19	10	5	4	21	16	+5	52.63

Last updated: 17 May 2025
Source: Competitions

=== Campeonato Brasileiro Série C ===
==== First stage ====
Pos	Team	Pld	W	D	L	GF	GA	GD	Pts	Qualification or relegation
1	Caxias	19	12	1	6	26	21	+5	37	Advance to Second stage
2	Ponte Preta	19	11	3	5	20	16	+4	36	Advance to Second stage
3	Náutico	19	10	6	3	25	7	+18	36	Advance to Second stage
4	Londrina	19	8	6	5	27	19	+8	30	Advance to Second stage
5	São Bernardo	19	8	6	5	19	15	+4	30	Advance to Second stage

Source: CBF
Rules for classification: 1) points; 2) wins; 3) goal difference; 4) goals scored; 5) fewest red cards; 6) fewest yellow cards; 7) draw.

==== Results summary ====
Overall								Home						Away					
Pld	W	D	L	GF	GA	GD	Pts	W	D	L	GF	GA	GD	W	D	L	GF	GA	GD
6	4	1	1	8	6	+2	13	2	0	1	4	4	0	2	1	0	4	2	+2

Last updated: 17 May 2025.

===== Results by round =====
Round	1	2	3	4	5	6
Ground	A	H	A	H	A	H
Result	D	W	W	W	W	L
Position						

Updated to match(es) played on 17 May 2025. Source:
A = Away; H = Home; W = Win; D = Draw; L = Loss

==== Matches ====
The match schedule was unveiled on 27 February.

12 April 2025 1	Figueirense	1–1	Ponte Preta	Florianópolis
16:00 UTC−3	Marlyson 64'		Serginho 75'	Stadium: Estádio Orlando Scarpelli; Referee: Tarcizio Pinheiro Caetano

19 April 2025 2	Ponte Preta	1–0	Retrô	Campinas
17:00	Jonas Toró 17'			Stadium: Estádio Moisés Lucarelli

26 April 2025 3	Confiança	1–2	Ponte Preta	Aracaju
17:00				Stadium: Batistão

3 May 2025 4	Ponte Preta	2–0	Anápolis	Campinas
19:30				Stadium: Estádio Moisés Lucarelli

12 May 2025 5	Ituano	0–1	Ponte Preta
19:30

17 May 2025 6	Ponte Preta	1–4	Brusque	Campinas
19:30				Stadium: Estádio Moisés Lucarelli

24 May 2025 7	Náutico	0–1	Ponte Preta

2 June 2025 8	Ponte Preta	0–1	Ypiranga

14 June 2025 9	Ponte Preta	0–0	ABC

28 June 2025 10	Maringá	0–1	Ponte Preta

7 July 2025 11	Ponte Preta	1–0	Tombense

12 July 2025 12	São Bernardo	2–0	Ponte Preta

19 July 2025 13	Ponte Preta	2–1	Floresta	Campinas
19:30 UTC−3				Stadium: Estádio Moisés Lucarelli

27 July 2025 14	Caxias	2–1	Ponte Preta
16:30 UTC−3

2 August 2025 15	Ponte Preta	1–1	Guarani	Campinas
17:00 UTC−3				Stadium: Estádio Moisés Lucarelli

9 August 2025 16	Botafogo-PB	2–1	Ponte Preta
17:00 UTC−3

16 August 2025 17	Ponte Preta	1–0	Itabaiana	Campinas
17:00 UTC−3				Stadium: Estádio Moisés Lucarelli

25 August 2025 18	CSA	1–2	Ponte Preta
19:30 UTC−3

30 August 2025 19	Ponte Preta	1–0	Londrina	Campinas
17:00 UTC−3				Stadium: Estádio Moisés Lucarelli

==== Second stage ====
Group C

Pos	Team	Pld	W	D	L	GF	GA	GD	Pts	Qualification
1	Ponte Preta (P)	6	4	1	1	7	3	+4	13	Advance to Finals and promoted to 2026 Série B
2	Náutico (P)	6	2	2	2	5	6	−1	8	Promoted to 2026 Série B
3	Guarani	6	2	1	3	6	7	−1	7	
4	Brusque	6	2	0	4	6	8	−2	6	

Source: CBF
Rules for classification: 1) points; 2) wins; 3) goal difference; 4) goals scored; 5) head-to-head results (only between 2 teams); 6) fewest red cards; 7) fewest yellow cards; 8) draw.
(P) Promoted

6 September 2025 1	Guarani	0–1	Ponte Preta	Campinas
17:00 UTC−3				Stadium: Estádio Brinco de Ouro da Princesa

14 September 2025 2	Ponte Preta	1–0	Brusque	Campinas
19:00 UTC−3				Stadium: Estádio Moisés Lucarelli

20 September 2025 3	Náutico	0–1	Ponte Preta	Recife
17:00 UTC−3				Stadium: Estádio dos Aflitos

27 September 2025 4	Ponte Preta	1–1	Náutico	Campinas
17:00 UTC−3				Stadium: Estádio Moisés Lucarelli

4 October 2025 5	Brusque	2–1	Ponte Preta	Brusque
19:30 UTC−3				Stadium: Estádio Augusto Bauer

11 October 2025 6	Ponte Preta	2–0	Guarani	Campinas
17:00 UTC−3				Stadium: Estádio Moisés Lucarelli

==== Finals ====
18 October 2025 First leg	Londrina	0–0	Ponte Preta
17:00 UTC−3

25 October 2025 Second leg	Ponte Preta	2–0 (2–0 agg.)	Londrina
17:00 UTC−3

=== Campeonato Paulista ===
==== Group D ====
15 January 2025 1	Novorizontino	0–1	Ponte Preta
18:30 UTC−3

19 January 2025 2	Ponte Preta	1–1	Santos
20:30 UTC−3

22 January 2025 3	Ponte Preta	0–0	Portuguesa
20:00 UTC−3

25 January 2025 4	Inter de Limeira	1–1	Ponte Preta
16:00 UTC−3

29 January 2025 5	Ponte Preta	0–1	Corinthians
20:30 UTC−3

2 February 2025 6	Água Santa	0–1	Ponte Preta
16:00 UTC−3

5 February 2025 7	Noroeste	1–2	Ponte Preta
19:30 UTC−3

9 February 2025 8	Ponte Preta	2–0	Guarani
16:00 UTC−3

12 February 2025 9	Mirassol	1–2	Ponte Preta
19:30 UTC−3

15 February 2025 10	Ponte Preta	0–0	Botafogo-SP
16:00 UTC−3

19 February 2025 11	São Paulo	1–2	Ponte Preta
19:30 UTC−3

23 February 2025 12	Ponte Preta	0–2	Red Bull Bragantino
18:30 UTC−3

=== Copa do Brasil ===
26 February 2025 First round	Concórdia	2–1	Ponte Preta	Concórdia
21:30 UTC−3	Felipe Rangel 45'; Zé Andrade 51'		Éverton Brito 14'; Jean Dias (red card) 82'	Stadium: Estádio Domingos Machado de Lima; Referee: Lucas Casagrande
