= Pablo Thomaz =

Brazilian footballer

Personal information
- Full name: Pablo Thiago Ferreira Thomaz
- Date of birth: 7 September 1999 (age 27)
- Place of birth: Ribeirão Preto, Brazil
- Height: 1.77 m (5 ft 10 in)
- Position: Forward

Team information
- Current team: Uberlândia
- Number: 19

Youth career
- 2014–2019: Coritiba

Senior career*
Years	Team	Apps	(Gls)
2018–2021	Coritiba	20	(0)
2020	→ Red Bull Brasil (loan)	15	(3)
2021–2022	Santos	0	(0)
2022	→ Paraná (loan)	16	(0)
2023	Audax Rio	15	(6)
2023–2024	CEOV	13	(12)
2023–2024	→ Guarani (loan)	20	(3)
2024	Maricá	14	(8)
2025	Botafogo-SP	17	(1)
2025–2026	Maricá	32	(11)
2026–	Uberlândia	4	(0)
- * Club domestic league appearances and goals as of 19 November 2026

Pablo Thiago Ferreira Thomaz (born 7 September 1999), known as Pablo Thomaz, is a Brazilian footballer who plays as a forward for Uberlândia.

== Club career ==
=== Coritiba ===
Born in Ribeirão Preto, São Paulo, Pablo Thomaz joined Coritiba's youth setup in December 2014, aged 15. He made his first team debut on 11 June 2018, starting in a 1–1 Série B away draw against Juventude.

After spending the entire 2019 campaign featuring only with the under-20 and under-23 squads, Pablo Thomaz was loaned to Red Bull Brasil on 6 January 2020. He scored his first senior goal while on loan at the club, netting the game's only in a 1–0 home success over São Caetano on 12 February.

In October 2020, Pablo Thomaz was recalled by Coxa, and was assigned back to the main squad now in the Série A. He made his debut in the category on 4 October, coming on as a late substitute for Gabriel in a 1–1 home draw against São Paulo.

On 24 July 2021, after again being rarely used, Pablo Thomaz terminated his contract with Coritiba.

=== Santos ===
On 29 July 2021, Pablo Thomaz signed for Santos, being initially assigned to the under-23 squad. On 30 December, he was loaned to Paraná until the end of the 2022 Campeonato Paranaense.

== Career statistics ==
As of 11 February 2025.

Club	Season	League			State League		Cup		Continental		Other		Total	
Club	Season	Division	Apps	Goals	Apps	Goals	Apps	Goals	Apps	Goals	Apps	Goals	Apps	Goals
Coritiba	2018	Série B	5	0	0	0	0	0	—		—		5	0
Coritiba	2019	Série B	5	0	0	0	0	0	—		—		5	0
Coritiba	2020	Série A	13	0	—		0	0	—		—		13	0
Coritiba	2021	Série B	0	0	2	0	0	0	—		—		2	0
Coritiba	Total		13	0	2	0	0	0	—		—		15	0
Red Bull Brasil (loan)	2020	Série A2	—		15	3	—		—		—		15	3
Santos	2021	Série A	0	0	—		—		—		5 (Note: Appearance(s) in Copa Paulista)	0	5	0
Paraná (loan)	2022	Série D	8	0	8	0	1	0	—		—		17	0
Audax Rio	2023	Carioca	—		13	6	—		—		—		13	6
CEOV	2023	Série D	13	12	—		—		—		—		13	12
Guarani (loan)	2023	Série B	13	1	—		—		—		—		13	1
Guarani (loan)	2024	Série B	0	0	7	2	—		—		—		7	2
Guarani (loan)	Total		13	1	7	2	—		—		—		20	3
Maricá	2024	Carioca Série A2	—		14	8	—		—		8 (Note: Appearance(s) in Copa Rio)	5	22	13
Botafogo-SP	2025	Série B	0	0	7	1	—		—		—		7	1
Career total			47	13	66	20	1	0	0	0	13	5	127	38

== Honours ==
Maricá

- Campeonato Carioca Série A2: 2024
- Copa Rio: 2024
