= Jonas Toró =

Brazilian footballer

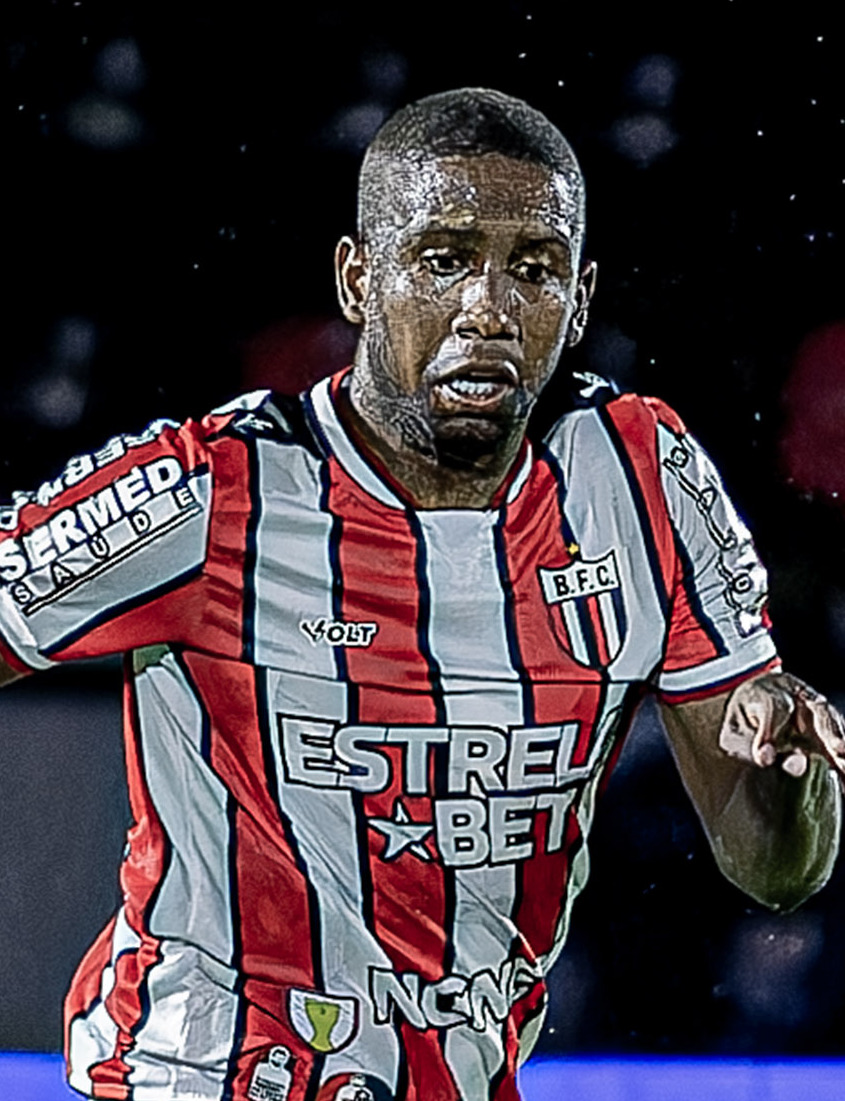
- Toró playing for Botafogo-SP in 2024

Personal information
- Full name: Jonas Gabriel da Silva Nunes
- Date of birth: 30 May 1999 (age 27)
- Place of birth: Belém de São Francisco, Brazil
- Height: 1.77 m (5 ft 10 in)
- Position: Winger

Team information
- Current team: Portuguesa
- Number: 10

Youth career
- 2015: Comercial de Salto
- 2016–2018: Primavera
- 2017–2018: → São Paulo (loan)
- 2018: São Paulo

Senior career*
Years	Team	Apps	(Gls)
2019–2022	São Paulo	38	(5)
2021	→ Sport Recife (loan)	9	(1)
2021	→ Atlético Goianiense (loan)	13	(1)
2022–2024	Panathinaikos	0	(0)
2022–2023	→ Levadiakos (loan)	12	(0)
2023–2024	→ Botafogo-SP (loan)	32	(2)
2024–2025	Botafogo-SP	19	(0)
2025	→ Ponte Preta (loan)	22	(8)
2026	Náutico	4	(1)
2026–	Portuguesa	8	(1)
2026	→ Botafogo-PB (loan)	6	(0)

International career^{‡}
2019	Brazil U20	8	(0)
- * Club domestic league appearances and goals as of 20:38, 10 November 2026 (UTC) ‡ National team caps and goals as of 18:02, 17 June 2019 (UTC)

Jonas Gabriel da Silva Nunes (born 30 May 1999), known as Jonas Toró or simply Toró, is a Brazilian professional footballer who plays as a winger for Portuguesa.

== Club career ==
=== Early career ===
Born in Belém de São Francisco, Pernambuco, Toró played amateur matches in his hometown before playing for Comercial Esporte Clube de Salto at the age of 16. He then played for Primavera before moving to the youth sides of São Paulo in early 2017.

Initially on loan, Toró was the top scorer of the 2018 Copa São Paulo de Futebol Júnior, and signed a permanent contract with the club in July of that year.

=== São Paulo ===
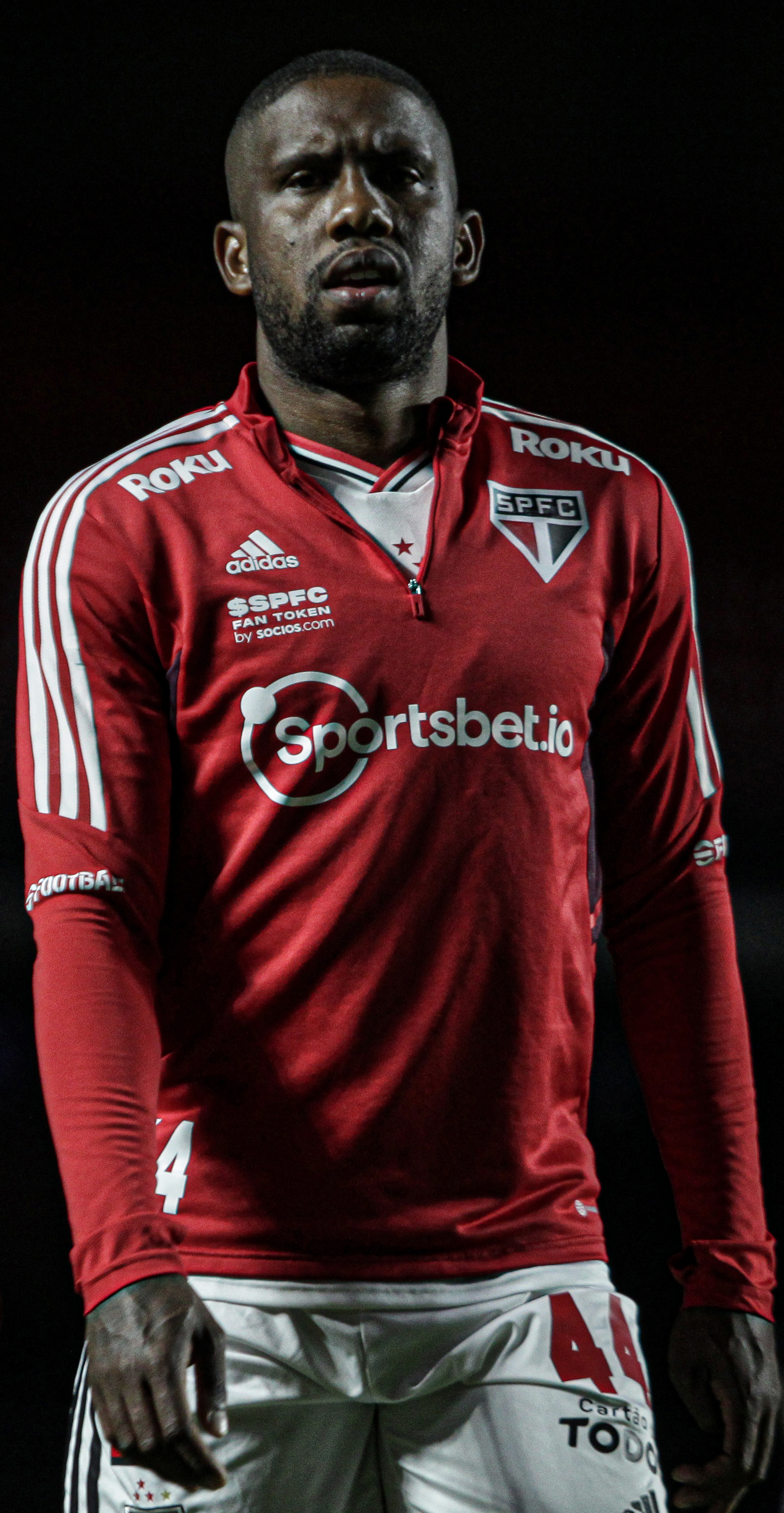
Toró with São Paulo in 2022

Promoted to the first team for the 2019 season, Toró made his first team – and Série A – debut with Tricolor on 27 April 2019, coming on as a second-half substitute for Alexandre Pato in a 2–0 home win over Botafogo. Four days later, he was handed his first start and scored his team's second in a 2–1 away success over Goiás.

Regularly used under head coach Cuca, Toró lost space after the arrival of Fernando Diniz.

==== Loan to Sport Recife ====
On 9 March 2021, Sport Recife announced the signing of Toró on loan until the end of the year. Regularly used in the 2021 Campeonato Pernambucano, he alleged unpaid wages in June, and stated his desire to leave the club.

==== Loan to Atlético Goianiense ====
On 16 July 2021, Toró moved to fellow top tier side Atlético Goianiense also on loan. He was used as a substitute at the side, coming off the bench in all 15 appearances, as the club finished ninth.

==== Return from loan ====
Back to his parent club, Toró was included back in the first team of São Paulo by head coach Rogério Ceni in January 2022. He scored on his first match back at the club, a 3–0 win at Mirassol on 15 March, but only featured in a further five matches during that season.

=== Panathinaikos ===
On 4 August 2022, Toró moved abroad and was announced at Greek side Panathinaikos on a three-year contract.

==== Loan to Levadiakos ====
On 7 September 2022, Toró was loaned to fellow Super League Greece side Levadiakos for the season. He only played 16 matches overall, as the club suffered relegation.

=== Botafogo-SP ===
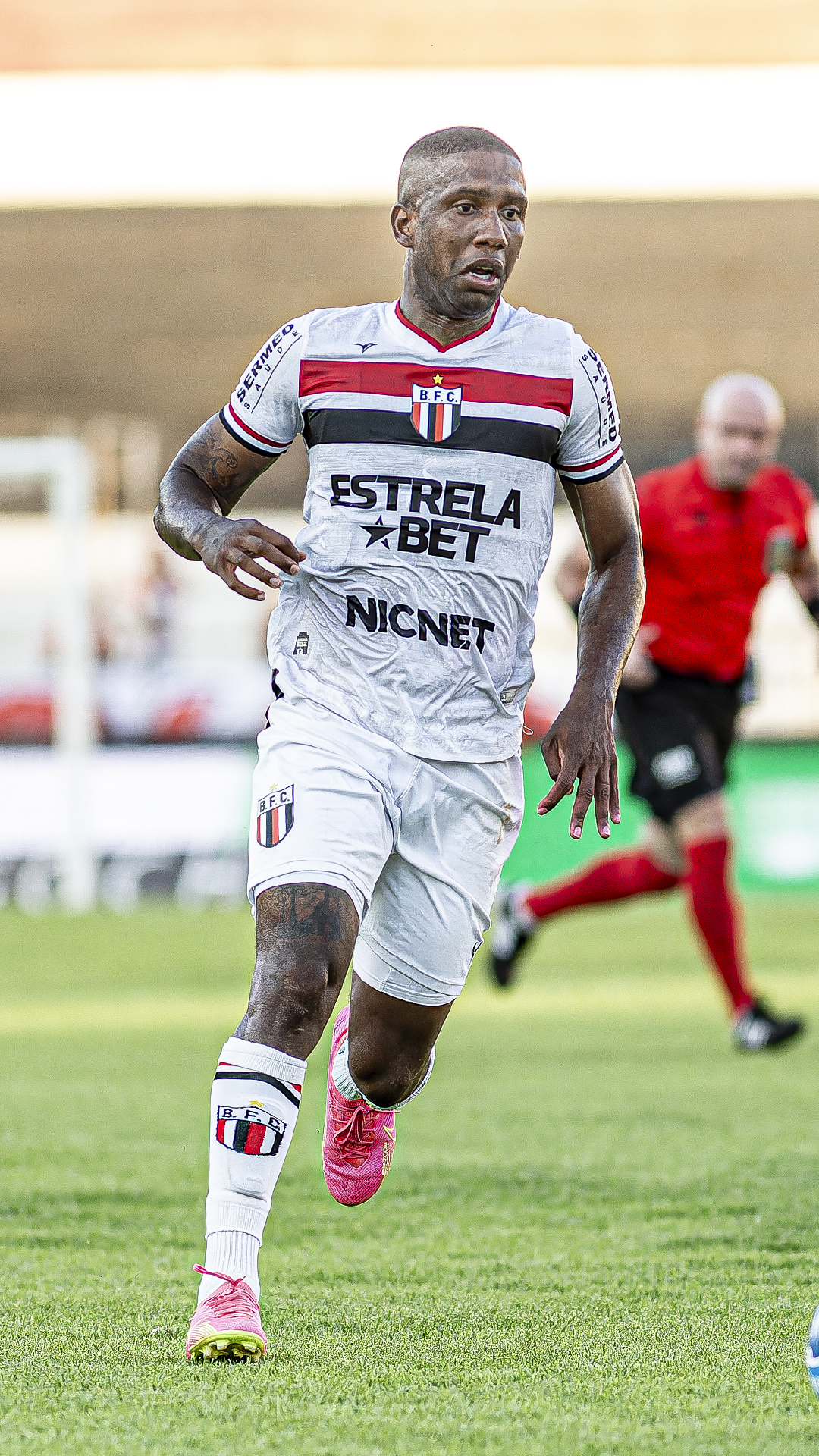
Toró in action for Botafogo-SP in 2023

On 10 July 2023, Toró returned to Brazil and agreed to a one-year loan deal with Botafogo-SP in the Série B. On 18 July of the following year, after establishing himself as a regular starter, he signed a permanent deal with the club until June 2026.

==== Loan to Ponte Preta ====
On 3 April 2025, after losing his starting spot, Toró was loaned to Ponte Preta. He immediately became a first-choice at his new side, helping them to win the 2025 Série C by scoring eight goals, being the competition's top scorer.

=== Náutico ===
On 17 December 2025, Náutico announced the signing of Toró, after terminating his link with Botafogo. The following 25 March, after just four matches, he left the club by mutual consent.

=== Portuguesa ===
On 26 March 2026, a day after leaving Náutico, Toró signed a contract with Portuguesa in the Série D until April 2027.

==== Loan to Botafogo-PB ====
On 7 August 2026, after Lusa's elimination in the fourth division, Toró was loaned to Botafogo-PB in the third tier.

== International career ==
In December 2018, Toró was called up to the Brazil national under-20 team for the 2019 South American U-20 Championship. He played in eight matches during the competition, as the nation narrowly missed out a spot in the 2019 FIFA U-20 World Cup.

== Career statistics ==
As of 10 November 2026.

Club	Season	League			State League (Note: Includes Campeonato Paulista, Campeonato Pernambucano)		Cup (Note: Includes Copa do Brasil, Greek Cup)		Continental		Other		Total	
Club	Season	Division	Apps	Goals	Apps	Goals	Apps	Goals	Apps	Goals	Apps	Goals	Apps	Goals
São Paulo	2019	Série A	17	3	0	0	2	0	—		—		19	3
São Paulo	2020	Série A	13	1	5	0	2	0	4 (Note: Appearance(s) in Copa Libertadores)	0	—		24	1
São Paulo	2021	Série A	0	0	1	0	0	0	—		—		1	0
São Paulo	2022	Série A	1	0	1	1	0	0	4 (Note: Appearance(s) in Copa Sudamericana)	0	—		6	1
São Paulo	Total		31	4	7	1	4	0	8	0	—		50	5
Sport Recife (loan)	2021	Série A	0	0	9	1	0	0	—		4 (Note: Appearance(s) in Copa do Nordeste)	1	13	2
Atlético Goianiense (loan)	2021	Série A	13	1	—		2	0	—		—		15	1
Levadiakos (loan)	2022–23	Super League Greece	12	0	—		2	0	—		2 (Note: Appearances in Super League Greece Playout)	0	16	0
Botafogo-SP	2023	Série B	16	1	—		—		—		—		16	1
Botafogo-SP	2024	Série B	18	1	9	0	4	0	—		—		31	1
Botafogo-SP	2025	Série B	0	0	8	0	—		—		—		8	0
Botafogo-SP	Total		34	2	17	0	4	0	0	0	0	0	55	2
Ponte Preta (loan)	2025	Série C	22	8	—		—		—		—		22	8
Náutico	2026	Série B	0	0	4	1	—		—		—		4	1
Portuguesa	2026	Série D	8	1	—		—		—		—		8	1
Botafogo-PB (loan)	2026	Série C	6	0	—		—		—		—		6	0
Career total			126	16	37	3	12	0	8	0	6	1	189	20

== Honours ==
Ponte Preta

- Campeonato Brasileiro Série C: 2025

São Paulo U20

- Copa do Brasil Sub-20: 2018
- Supercopa do Brasil Sub-20: 2018

Individual

- 2025 Campeonato Brasileiro Série C top scorer: 8 goals
