= Jean Lucas (footballer, born 1995) =

Brazilian footballer

Personal information
- Full name: Jean Lucas Figueiredo
- Date of birth: 21 March 1995 (age 31)
- Place of birth: Curitiba, Brazil
- Height: 1.74 m (5 ft 9 in)
- Position: Attacking midfielder

Team information
- Current team: Avaí
- Number: 10

Youth career
- 2011–2015: Coritiba

Senior career*
Years	Team	Apps	(Gls)
2016	Boavista		
2017	Prudentópolis	12	(1)
2017–2019	Paraná	5	(0)
2018	→ Inter de Lages (loan)	13	(2)
2018	→ Joinville (loan)	14	(1)
2020	Concórdia	9	(0)
2020	Criciúma	17	(2)
2021–2023	Tombense	59	(10)
2023	→ Avaí (loan)	9	(1)
2024–	Avaí	65	(5)
2025	→ Operário Ferroviário (loan)	20	(1)
- * Club domestic league appearances and goals as of 18 November 2026

Jean Lucas Figueiredo (born 21 March 1995), simply known as Jean Lucas, is a Brazilian professional footballer who plays as an attacking midfielder for Avaí.

== Career ==
Jean Lucas was revealed by the youth sector of Coritiba FBC. He played professionally for Boavista, Prudentópolis, Paraná, Inter de Lages, Joinville, Concórdia, Criciúma, Tombense and Avaí, where he has been since 2023.

For the 2025 season, Jean Lucas was loaned to Operário Ferroviário.

== Personal life ==
Jean Lucas is the brother of footballer Dudu Figueiredo.

== Honours ==
Avaí

- Recopa Catarinense: 2026
- Copa Sul-Sudeste: 2026
