= 2026 Copa Sul-Sudeste =

Tournament details
- Country: Brazil
- Dates: 24 March – 7 June
- Teams: 12

Final positions
- Champions: Avaí (1st title)
- Runners-up: Chapecoense
- 2027 Copa do Brasil: Avaí

Tournament statistics
- Matches played: 42
- Goals scored: 113 (2.69 per match)

The 2026 Copa Sul-Sudeste was the inaugural edition of the football competition held in the Brazil. The tournament began on 24 March and ended on 7 June 2026.

== Format ==
In the group stage, the 12 teams were drawn into two groups of six. Each team played each of the six clubs from the other group once. The top two teams advanced to the semifinals, which were played over two legs. Those who qualify advanced to the final, which also was played in two matches.

== Qualified teams ==
Association	Team	Qualification method
Minas Gerais (Note: Since the Taça Minas Gerais is no longer disputed, the only possible qualification for Minas Gerais teams is via 2025 Campeonato Mineiro. For the other states where state cups are being played in 2025, the federations have not yet officially announced the distribution of the berths, since the spot was initially expected for the 2026 Copa do Brasil dispute.); 2 berths	América Mineiro	2025 Campeonato Mineiro best team with that did not qualify for CONMEBOL competitions
Minas Gerais; 2 berths	Tombense	Second best team with that did not qualify for CONMEBOL competitions
(Paraná (state)) Paraná (Note: Paraná and Santa Catarina have no teams in the 2025 Campeonato Brasileiro Série A or competing in the final stages of the 2025 Copa do Brasil, turning it impossible for them clubs to qualify for international tournaments for 2026 season. The Paraná federation was the first to officially announce the distribution of spots.); 2 berths	Operário Ferroviário	2025 Campeonato Paranaense champions
(Paraná (state)) Paraná; 2 berths	Cianorte	2025 Taça FPF champions
(Rio de Janeiro (state)) Rio de Janeiro; 2 berths	Volta Redonda	2025 Campeonato Carioca best team with that did not qualify for CONMEBOL competitions
(Rio de Janeiro (state)) Rio de Janeiro; 2 berths	Sampaio Corrêa	Second best team with that did not qualify for CONMEBOL competitions
(Rio Grande do Sul) Rio Grande do Sul; 2 berths	Juventude	2025 Campeonato Gaúcho second best team with that did not qualify for CONMEBOL competitions
(Rio Grande do Sul) Rio Grande do Sul; 2 berths	Caxias (Note: Internacional withdrew from the competition on 18 February, and Caxias was confirmed in their spot the following day.)	Third best team with that did not qualify for CONMEBOL competitions
(Santa Catarina (state)) Santa Catarina; 2 berths	Avaí	2025 Campeonato Catarinense champions
(Santa Catarina (state)) Santa Catarina; 2 berths	Chapecoense	2025 Campeonato Catarinense runners-up
(São Paulo (state)) São Paulo; 2 berths	São Bernardo	2025 Campeonato Paulista best team with that did not qualify for CONMEBOL competitions
(São Paulo (state)) São Paulo; 2 berths	Novorizontino	Second best team with that did not qualify for CONMEBOL competitions

== Group stage ==
In the group stage, the 12 teams were drawn into two groups of six teams each. Each team in Group A played each team in Group B once. The top two teams of each group advanced to the semi-finals of the knockout stages. The teams were ranked according to points (3 points for a win, 1 point for a draw, and 0 points for a loss). If tied on points, the following criteria would be used to determine the ranking: 1. Wins; 2. Goal difference; 3. Goals scored; 4. Fewest red cards; 5. Fewest yellow cards; 6. Draw in the headquarters of the Brazilian Football Confederation (Regulations Article 13).

=== Group A ===
Pos	Team	Pld	W	D	L	GF	GA	GD	Pts	Qualification
1	(Santa Catarina (state)) Chapecoense	6	4	1	1	8	5	+3	13	Advance to semi-finals
2	(São Paulo (state)) Novorizontino	6	3	2	1	8	5	+3	11	Advance to semi-finals
3	(Rio Grande do Sul) Caxias	6	3	2	1	6	3	+3	11	
4	(Paraná (state)) Cianorte	6	2	2	2	9	10	−1	8	
5	(Minas Gerais) Tombense	6	1	2	3	11	13	−2	5	
6	(Rio de Janeiro (state)) Sampaio Corrêa	6	1	2	3	7	9	−2	5	

Source: CBF

=== Group B ===
Pos	Team	Pld	W	D	L	GF	GA	GD	Pts	Qualification
1	(Santa Catarina (state)) Avaí	6	3	1	2	10	8	+2	10	Advance to semi-finals
2	(Rio de Janeiro (state)) Volta Redonda	6	3	1	2	9	8	+1	10	Advance to semi-finals
3	(Paraná (state)) Operário Ferroviário	6	2	3	1	5	4	+1	9	
4	(Minas Gerais) América Mineiro	6	2	2	2	11	11	0	8	
5	(Rio Grande do Sul) Juventude	6	1	1	4	4	9	−5	4	
6	(São Paulo (state)) São Bernardo	6	0	3	3	6	9	−3	3	

Source: CBF

== Final stages ==
In the final stages, the teams played a single-elimination tournament with the following rules:

- Semi-finals and Finals were played on a home-and-away two-legged basis, with the higher-seeded team hosting the second leg.
  - If tied on aggregate, a penalty shoot-out would be used to determine the winners (Regulations Article 18).
- Extra time would not be played and away goals rule would not be used in final stages.

In the Finals, the finalists were seeded according to their performance in the tournament. The teams were ranked according to overall points. If tied on overall points, the following criteria would be used to determine the ranking: 1. Overall wins; 2. Overall goal difference; 3. Overall goals scored; 4. Fewest red cards in the tournament; 5. Fewest yellow cards in the tournament; 6. Draw in the headquarters of the Brazilian Football Confederation (Regulations Article 16).

=== Bracket ===
Semi-finals
(Rio de Janeiro (state))	Volta Redonda	2	0	2
(Santa Catarina (state))	Avaí	2	3	5
(São Paulo (state))	Novorizontino	0	2	2
(Santa Catarina (state))	Chapecoense	2	2	4

Finals
(Santa Catarina (state))	Avaí (p)	3	0	3 (5)
(Santa Catarina (state))	Chapecoense	0	3	3 (4)

=== Semi-finals ===
Team 1	Agg.	Team 2	1st leg	2nd leg
Novorizontino (São Paulo (state))	2–4	(Santa Catarina (state)) Chapecoense	0–2	2–2
Volta Redonda (Rio de Janeiro (state))	2–5	(Santa Catarina (state)) Avaí	2–2	0–3

==== Group C ====
20 May 2026
19:00

Novorizontino (São Paulo (state))	0–2	(Santa Catarina (state)) Chapecoense
	Report	Neto Pessoa 45'; Jean Carlos 73'

Estádio Doutor Jorge Ismael de Biasi, Novo Horizonte
Referee: José Mendonça da Silva Júnior (Paraná)

27 May 2026
19:00

Chapecoense (Santa Catarina (state))	2–2	(São Paulo (state)) Novorizontino
Neto Pessoa 40'; Rafael Carvalheira 55'	Report	Diego Galo 38'; Antony 69'

Arena Condá, Chapecó
Referee: Roger Goulart (Rio Grande do Sul)

==== Group D ====
20 May 2026
19:00

Volta Redonda (Rio de Janeiro (state))	2–2	(Santa Catarina (state)) Avaí
Pedro Costa 16'; Alan 53'	Report	Wesley Gasolina 27'; Daniel Penha 90'

Estádio Raulino de Oliveira, Volta Redonda
Referee: Lucas Guimarães Rechatiko Horn (Rio Grande do Sul)

27 May 2026
19:00

Avaí (Santa Catarina (state))	3–0	(Rio de Janeiro (state)) Volta Redonda
Wallison 8'; Thayllon 55'; Daniel Penha 72'	Report

Estádio da Ressacada, Florianópolis
Referee: Kleber Ariel Gonçalves Silva (Paraná)

=== Finals ===
Pos	Team	Pld	W	D	L	GF	GA	GD	Pts	Host
1	(Santa Catarina (state)) Chapecoense	8	5	2	1	12	7	+5	17	2nd leg
2	(Santa Catarina (state)) Avaí	8	4	2	2	15	10	+5	14	1st leg

Source: CBF

Team 1	Agg.	Team 2	1st leg	2nd leg
Avaí (Santa Catarina (state))	3–3 (5–4 p)	(Santa Catarina (state)) Chapecoense	3–0	0–3

==== Group E ====
3 June 2026
20:00

Avaí (Santa Catarina (state))	3–0	(Santa Catarina (state)) Chapecoense
Jean Lucas 5', 36'; Wallison 45+2'	Report

Estádio da Ressacada, Florianópolis
Referee: João Vitor Gobi (São Paulo)

7 June 2026
11:00

Chapecoense (Santa Catarina (state))	3–0	(Santa Catarina (state)) Avaí
João Paulo 23', 75'; Bruno Pacheco 90+1'	Report
Penalties
Neto Pessoa (penalty scored); Jean Carlos (penalty scored); Rubens (penalty missed); Camilo Reijers (penalty scored); Marcinho (penalty scored)	4–5	(penalty scored) Daniel Penha; (penalty scored) DG; (penalty scored) Paulo Vitor; (penalty scored) Walace França; (penalty scored) Wenderson

Arena Condá, Chapecó
Referee: André Luiz Skettino Policarpo Bento (Minas Gerais)
