= Gabriel Simples =

Brazilian footballer

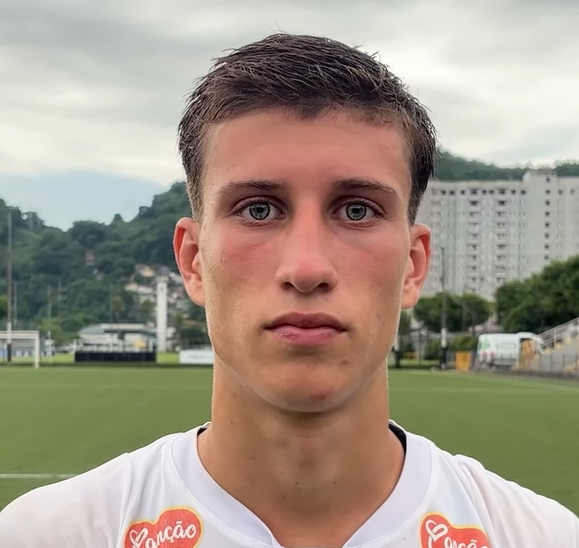
- Simples in 2025

Personal information
- Full name: Gabriel Pereira Simples
- Date of birth: 18 January 2005 (age 21)
- Place of birth: Americana, Brazil
- Height: 1.90 m (6 ft 3 in)
- Positions: Centre-back; right-back

Team information
- Current team: Avaí
- Number: 4

Youth career
- União Barbarense
- Inter de Limeira
- Amparo
- 2023–2024: XV de Piracicaba
- 2024–2025: Santos

Senior career*
Years	Team	Apps	(Gls)
2023–2024	XV de Piracicaba	0	(0)
2026–	Avaí	16	(0)
- * Club domestic league appearances and goals as of 18 November 2026

Gabriel Pereira Simples (born 18 January 2005) is a Brazilian footballer who plays as either a centre-back or a right-back for Avaí.

== Career ==
Born in Americana, São Paulo, Simples played for União Barbarense, Inter de Limeira, Amparo and XV de Piracicaba as a youth. He made his senior debut with the latter on 14 July 2023, starting in a 1–0 away win over Oeste, for the year's Copa Paulista.

In July 2024, Simples moved to Santos and returned to the youth setup. After winning the 2025 Campeonato Paulista Sub-20, he signed a two-year contract with Avaí on 26 December of that year.

At Avaí, Simples was moved to a centre-back position.

== Career statistics ==
As of 15 April 2026.

Club	Season	League			State League		Cup		Continental		Other		Total	
Club	Season	Division	Apps	Goals	Apps	Goals	Apps	Goals	Apps	Goals	Apps	Goals	Apps	Goals
XV de Piracicaba	2023	Paulista A2	—		—		—		—		1 (Note: Appearance(s) in Copa Paulista)	0	1	0
Avaí	2026	Série B	0	0	9	0	0	0	—		0	0	9	0
Career total			0	0	9	0	0	0	0	0	1	0	10	0

== Honours ==
Santos U20

- Campeonato Paulista Sub-20: 2025
