= Diego Galo (footballer, born 2005) =

Brazilian footballer

Personal information
- Full name: Diego Henrique Galo da Silva
- Date of birth: 4 September 2005 (age 21)
- Place of birth: General Salgado, Brazil
- Height: 1.78 m (5 ft 10 in)
- Position: Midfielder

Team information
- Current team: Novorizontino
- Number: 19

Youth career
- 2015–2016: Rio Preto
- 2021–2025: Novorizontino
- 2024–2025: → Atlético Mineiro (loan)

Senior career*
Years	Team	Apps	(Gls)
2026–	Novorizontino	24	(2)
- * Club domestic league appearances and goals as of 17 November 2026

Diego Henrique Galo da Silva (born 4 June 2005) is a Brazilian professional footballer who plays as a midfielder for Novorizontino.

== Career ==
Born in General Salgado, São Paulo, Galo played for the youth sides of Rio Preto and Novorizontino as a youth. On 6 March 2024, after impressing with the under-20 team of the latter in the Copa São Paulo de Futebol Júnior, he was loaned to Atlético Mineiro for one year.

Back to Tigre in July 2025, Galo was promoted to the first team for the 2026 season, and made his professional debut on 10 January of that year, starting and scoring the opener in a 2–1 Campeonato Paulista away loss to Santos.

== Career statistics ==
As of 21 May 2026

Club	Season	League			State League		Cup		Continental		Other		Total	
Club	Season	Division	Apps	Goals	Apps	Goals	Apps	Goals	Apps	Goals	Apps	Goals	Apps	Goals
Novorizontino	2026	Série B	5	1	6	1	0	0	—		2 (Note: Appearance(s) in Copa Sul-Sudeste)	1	13	3
Career total			5	1	6	1	0	0	0	0	2	1	13	3
