= Ericson (footballer) =

Brazilian footballer (born 1999)

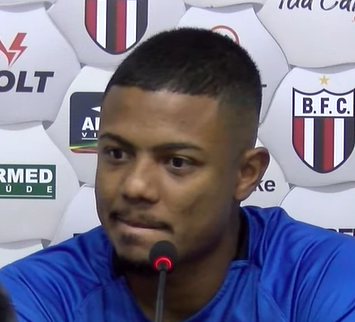
- Ericson in 2023

Personal information
- Full name: Ericson da Silva
- Date of birth: 11 May 1999 (age 27)
- Place of birth: Campinas, Brazil
- Height: 1.84 m (6 ft 0 in)
- Position: Centre-back

Team information
- Current team: Botafogo-SP

Youth career
- 2010–2013: Ponte Preta
- 2014–2015: Amparo
- 2015–2019: Grêmio

Senior career*
| Years | Team | Apps | (Gls) |
| 2017–2022 | Grêmio | 3 | (0) |
| 2022– | Botafogo-SP | 114 | (3) |
- * Club domestic league appearances and goals as of 18 November 2026

Ericson da Silva (born 11 May 1999), simply known as Ericson, is a Brazilian professional footballer who plays for Botafogo-SP. Mainly a centre-back, he can also play as a right-back.

== Club career ==
=== Grêmio ===
Born in Campinas, Brazil, Ericson da Silva joined the Grêmio's Academy at the age of 16 in 2015.

== Career statistics ==
=== Club ===
As of 25 May 2021.

Appearances and goals by club, season and competition
| Club | Season | League | | | National Cup | | Continental | | Other | | Total | |
| Club | Season | Division | Apps | Goals | Apps | Goals | Apps | Goals | Apps | Goals | Apps | Goals |
|---|---|---|---|---|---|---|---|---|---|---|---|---|
| Grêmio | 2017 | Série A | 1 | 0 | — | | — | | — | | 1 | 0 |
| Grêmio | 2018 | Série A | — | | — | | — | | — | | 0 | 0 |
| Grêmio | 2019 | Série A | — | | — | | — | | — | | 0 | 0 |
| Grêmio | 2020 | Série A | — | | — | | — | | — | | 0 | 0 |
| Grêmio | 2021 | Série A | — | | — | | — | | — | | 0 | 0 |
| Grêmio | Total | | 1 | 0 | 0 | 0 | 0 | 0 | 0 | 0 | 1 | 0 |
| Career total | | | 1 | 0 | 0 | 0 | 0 | 0 | 0 | 0 | 1 | 0 |

== Honours ==
Grêmio

- Copa CONMEBOL Libertadores: 2017
- CONMEBOL Recopa Sudamericana: 2018
- Campeonato Gaúcho: 2018, 2019, 2020, 2021
