= Walace França =

Brazilian footballer

Personal information
- Full name: Walace dos Santos França
- Date of birth: August 24, 2005 (age 21)
- Place of birth: Guarujá, Brazil
- Height: 1.87 m (6 ft 1 1/2 in)
- Position: Striker

Team information
- Current team: Gil Vicente
- Number: 9

Youth career
- 2021–2022: Internacional
- 2022: Flamengo
- 2022: Maringá
- 2022–2024: Athletico Paranaense

Senior career*
Years	Team	Apps	(Gls)
2024–	Athletico Paranaense	2	(0)
2026	→ Avaí (loan)	14	(3)
2026–	→ Gil Vicente (loan)	0	(0)
- * Club domestic league appearances and goals ‡ National team caps and goals as of 15:41, 5 August 2026 (UTC)

Walace dos Santos França (born 24 August 2005) is a Brazilian footballer who plays as a striker for Primeira Liga club Gil Vicente, on loan from Athletico Paranaense.

== Club career ==
França joined Athletico Paranaense in 2022. At Athletico' he won the U17 Paranaenese in 2022 and 2023, the U20 South Cup in 2024 and 2025, and the 2025 Campeonato Brasileiro Sub-20 where he was also top scorer with 17 goals. He made his senior and professional debut with Athletico Paranaense in a 2–1 Campeonato Paranaense win over Londrina on 10 February 2024. On 21 January 2026, he joined Campeonato Brasileiro Série B club Avaí on a season-long loan.

On 10 July 2026, França transferred to the Portuguese Primeira Liga club Gil Vicente on a one-year loan deal.
