= Pedro Tortello =

Brazilian footballer

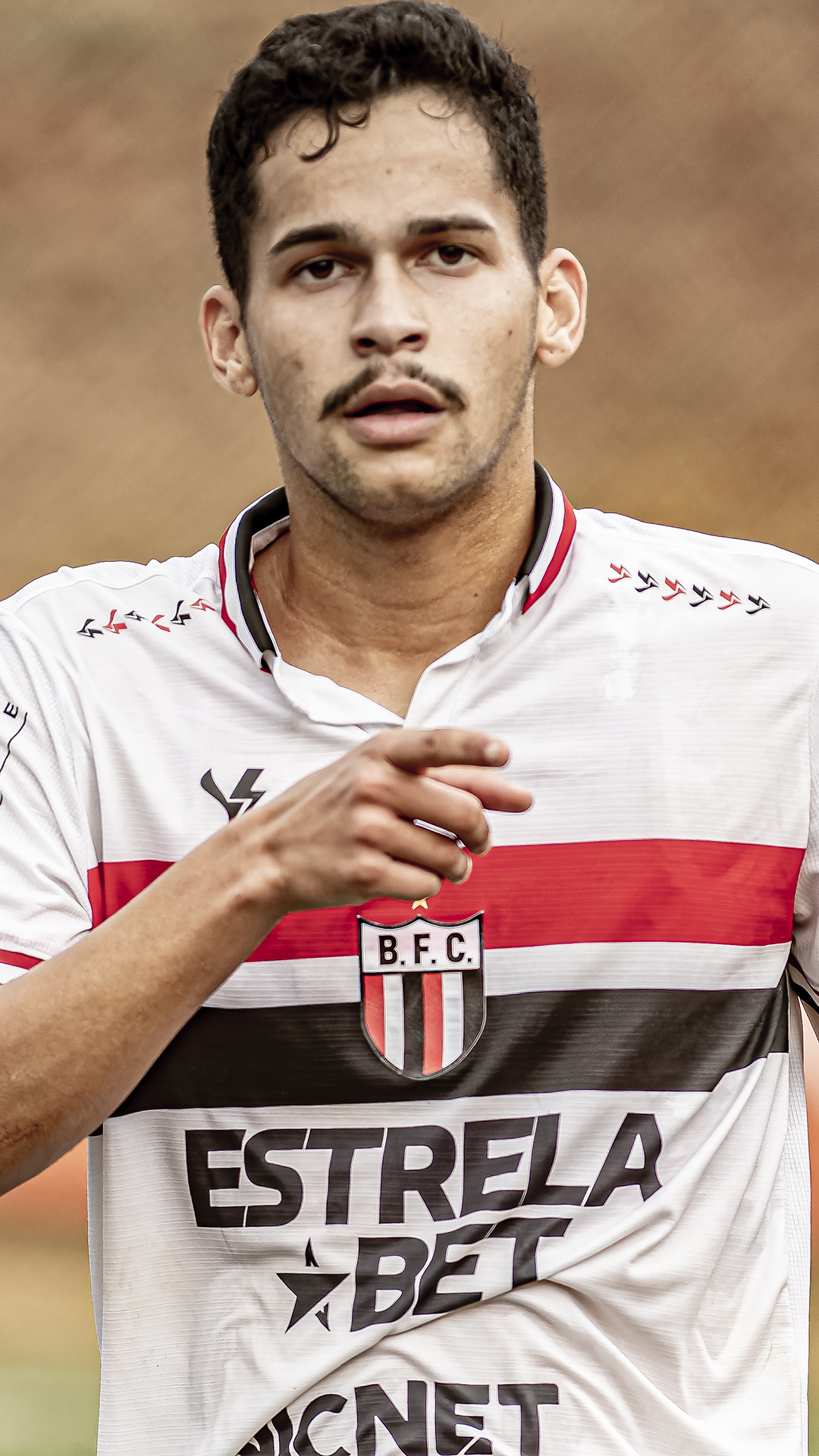

Personal information
- Full name: Pedro Henrique Tortello
- Date of birth: 24 May 2004 (age 22)
- Place of birth: Tambaú, Brazil
- Height: 1.77 m (5 ft 10 in)
- Position: Midfielder

Team information
- Current team: Botafogo-SP

Youth career
- 2019–: Botafogo-SP
- 2022–2023: → Internacional (loan)

Senior career*
Years	Team	Apps	(Gls)
2021–	Botafogo-SP	4	(0)
- * Club domestic league appearances and goals as of 18 December 2025

Pedro Henrique Tortello (born 25 May 2004), simply known as Tortello, is a Brazilian professional footballer who plays as a midfielder for Botafogo-SP.

== Career statistics ==
=== Club ===
As of 28 April 2021.

Club	Season	League			State League		Cup		Continental		Other		Total	
Club	Season	Division	Apps	Goals	Apps	Goals	Apps	Goals	Apps	Goals	Apps	Goals	Apps	Goals
Botafogo-SP	2021	Série C	0	0	1 (Note: Appearances in the Campeonato Paulista)	0	0	0	—		0	0	1	0
Career total			0	0	1	0	0	0	0	0	0	0	1	0
