= Ariel Mamede =

Brazilian football manager

Personal information
- Full name: Ariel Mamede Sousa
- Date of birth: 24 May 1989 (age 37)
- Place of birth: Goiânia, Brazil

Team information
- Current team: Vila Nova (assistant)

Managerial career
- Years: Team
- 2013: Vila Nova U15
- 2013–2014: Jardim América U15
- 2014: Vila Nova U17
- 2015: Vila Nova U20
- 2016: Rondoniense
- 2016: Grêmio Anápolis
- 2016–2017: Atlético Goianiense U20
- 2017–2018: Vila Nova U20
- 2018: Atlético Goianiense U19
- 2019: CEOV
- 2019: Jaraguá
- 2020: Vila Nova
- 2019: Jaraguá
- 2020: Real Brasília
- 2020–2021: Boa Esporte
- 2021: Goianésia
- 2022: Monte Azul
- 2022: Goiatuba
- 2022: Grêmio Anápolis
- 2022: Vila Nova (assistant)
- 2022: Jaraguá
- 2023: CEOV
- 2023: Cuiabá U23
- 2024: Real Brasília
- 2024: Trindade
- 2024: Iporá
- 2024–: Vila Nova (assistant)
- 2026: Vila Nova (interim)

Ariel Mamede Sousa (born 24 May 1989) is a Brazilian football coach, currently the assistant coach of Vila Nova.

== Honours ==
Jaraguá

- Campeonato Goiano Segunda Divisão: 2019
