= Anderson Batatais =

Brazilian footballer and coach (born 1972)

Personal information
- Full name: Anderson Luis da Silva
- Date of birth: 22 December 1972 (age 53)
- Place of birth: Batatais, Brazil
- Height: 1.92 m (6 ft 3 1/2 in)
- Position: Centre back

Team information
- Current team: Ceará (interim)

Senior career*
Years	Team	Apps	(Gls)
- Batatais
2001–2002	Paulista		
2003–2004	Albirex Niigata	51	(2)
2004	Atlético Sorocaba		
2005	Paulista		
2005–2006	Coritiba		
2007	Ponte Preta		
2008	Batatais		
2008	Fortaleza		

Managerial career
- 2009: Paulista (assistant)
- 2009: Vitória (assistant)
- 2009: Santos (assistant)
- 2010: Guarani (assistant)
- 2011: Ceará (assistant)
- 2011: Cruzeiro (assistant)
- 2012: Ceará (interim)
- 2012: Cruzeiro (assistant)
- 2013: Mirassol
- 2015–2017: Ceará U20
- 2015: Ceará (interim)
- 2017: Uniclinic
- 2018: Vitória (assistant)
- 2019: Guarany de Sobral
- 2020: Ferroviário
- 2020: Atlético Goianiense (assistant)
- 2020–2021: Corinthians (assistant)
- 2021: América Mineiro (assistant)
- 2021–2022: Ferroviário
- 2023: Novorizontino (assistant)
- 2024: Ceará (assistant)
- 2024: Ceará (interim)
- 2026: Ceará (interim)
- 2026–: Ceará (interim)
- * Club domestic league appearances and goals

Anderson Luis da Silva (born 22 December 1972), known as Anderson Silva or Anderson Batatais, is a Brazilian football coach and former player who played as a central defender. He is the current interim head coach of Ceará.

== Club statistics ==
Club performance			League		Cup		League Cup		Total	
Season	Club	League	Apps	Goals	Apps	Goals	Apps	Goals	Apps	Goals
Japan			League		Emperor's Cup		J.League Cup		Total	
2003	Albirex Niigata	J2 League	39	2	2	2	-		41	4
2004	Albirex Niigata	J1 League	12	0	0	0	3	0	15	0
Career total			51	2	2	2	3	0	56	4
