= 2025 Botafogo Futebol Clube (SP) season =

Botafogo Futebol Clube
2025 season
- Manager: Márcio Zanardi (until 18 May)
- Stadium: Estádio Santa Cruz
- Série B: 18th
- Campeonato Paulista: Pre-season
- Average home league attendance: 2,739
Home colours	Away colours	Third colours

The 2025 season is the 106th competitive season for Botafogo Futebol Clube. The team will compete in the Campeonato Brasileiro Série B for the second consecutive season and the Campeonato Paulista.

== Exhibition matches ==
7 January 2025	Ferroviária	1–0	Botafogo-SP	Araraquara
	Cássio Gabriel	Report		Stadium: Fonte Luminosa

11 January 2025	Botafogo-SP	1–1	Monte Azul	Ribeirão Preto
				Stadium: Estádio Santa Cruz

== Competitions ==
=== Overall record ===
Competition	First match	Last match	Starting round	Record							
Competition	First match	Last match	Starting round	Pld	W	D	L	GF	GA	GD	Win %
Série B	5 April 2025	22 November 2025	Matchday 1	0	0	0	0	0	0	+0	—
Campeonato Paulista	15 January 2025			2	0	1	1	0	2	−2	0.00
Total				2	0	1	1	0	2	−2	0.00

Last updated: 20 January 2025
Source: Competitions

=== Série B ===
==== League table ====
Pos	Team	Pld	W	D	L	GF	GA	GD	Pts	Promotion or relegation
14	América Mineiro	38	12	10	16	41	44	−3	46	
15	Athletic	38	12	8	18	43	53	−10	44	
16	Botafogo-SP	38	10	12	16	32	52	−20	42	
17	Ferroviária (R)	38	8	16	14	43	52	−9	40	Relegation to 2026 Campeonato Brasileiro Série C
18	Amazonas (R)	38	8	12	18	38	55	−17	36	Relegation to 2026 Campeonato Brasileiro Série C

Source: CBF
Rules for classification: 1) points; 2) wins; 3) goal difference; 4) goals scored; 5) head-to-head results (only between 2 teams); 6) fewest red cards; 7) fewest yellow cards; 8) drawing of lots.
(R) Relegated

==== Matches ====
4 April 2025 1	América Mineiro	1–0	Botafogo-SP	Belo Horizonte
18:30 UTC−3				Stadium: Estadio Raimundo Sampaio

13 April 2025 2	Botafogo-SP	1–1	Atlético Goianiense
19:00 UTC−3

17 April 2025 3	Botafogo-SP	2–2	Remo
20:00 UTC−3

20 April 2025 4	Vila Nova	2–0	Botafogo-SP
16:00 UTC−3

28 April 2025 5	Botafogo-SP	v	Goiás
19:30 UTC−3

28 July 2025 19	Avaí	5–0	Botafogo-SP

2 August 2025 20	Botafogo-SP	2–1	América Mineiro

10 August 2025 21	Atlético Goianiense	2–0	Botafogo-SP

16 August 2025 22	Remo	1–1	Botafogo-SP

=== Campeonato Paulista ===
==== League Table ====
Pos	Team	Pld	W	D	L	GF	GA	GD	Pts	Qualification
1	Corinthians	12	8	3	1	20	13	+7	27	Knockout stage
2	Mirassol	12	5	1	6	21	21	0	16	Knockout stage
3	Botafogo-SP	12	2	5	5	8	13	−5	11	
4	Inter de Limeira (R)	12	0	7	5	9	19	−10	7	Relegation to Série A2

Source: Soccerway
(R) Relegated

==== Results summary ====
Overall								Home						Away					
Pld	W	D	L	GF	GA	GD	Pts	W	D	L	GF	GA	GD	W	D	L	GF	GA	GD
12	2	5	5	8	13	−5	11	2	2	2	4	4	0	0	3	3	4	9	−5

Last updated: 10 March 2025.
Source: Soccerway

==== Results by round ====
Round	1	2	3	4	5	6	7	8	9	10	11	12
Ground	A	H	A	H	H	A	A	H	H	A	A	H
Result	L	D	D	L	D	L	D	W	W	D	L	L
Position												

Updated to match(es) played on 10 March 2025. Source:
A = Away; H = Home; W = Win; D = Draw; L = Loss

==== Matches ====
15 January 2025 1	Guarani	2–0	Botafogo-SP	Campinas
19:30 UTC−3	7' (o.g.); 63'			Stadium: Estádio Brinco de Ouro; Referee: Lucas Canetto Bellote

20 January 2025 2	Botafogo-SP	0–0	São Paulo	Ribeirão Preto
20:00 UTC−3				Stadium: Estádio Santa Cruz

24 January 2025 3	Noroeste	0–0	Botafogo-SP	Bauru
				Stadium: Estádio Alfredo de Castilho

26 January 2025 4	Botafogo-SP	0–1	São Bernardo	Ribeirão Preto
				Stadium: Estádio Santa Cruz

29 January 2025 5	Botafogo-SP	1–1	Água Santa	Ribeirão Preto
				Stadium: Estádio Santa Cruz

1 February 2025 6	Portuguesa	3–2	Botafogo-SP	São Paulo
				Stadium: Pacaembu Stadium

5 February 2025 7	Santos	1–1	Botafogo-SP	Santos
21:35 UTC-03:00	Tiquinho Soares 38' (pen.)	Report	67' Alexandre Jesus	Stadium: Vila Belmiro; Attendance: 15,377; Referee: Matheus Delgado Candançan

8 February 2025 8	Botafogo-SP	1–0	Velo Clube	Ribeirão Preto
				Stadium: Estádio Santa Cruz

11 February 2025 9	Botafogo-SP	1–0	Red Bull Bragantino	Ribeirão Preto
				Stadium: Estádio Santa Cruz

15 February 2025 10	Ponte Preta	0–0	Botafogo-SP	Campinas
				Stadium: Estádio Moisés Lucarelli

20 February 2025 11	Palmeiras	3–1	Botafogo-SP	São Paulo
19:30 UTC−3	Estêvão 29'; Torres 76'; Luighi 85'	Report	Alexandre Jesus 25'	Stadium: Allianz Parque; Attendance: 23,079; Referee: João Vitor Gobi

23 February 2025 12	Botafogo-SP	1–2	Novorizontino	Ribeirão Preto
				Stadium: Estádio Santa Cruz
