= Wallison =

Brazilian footballer

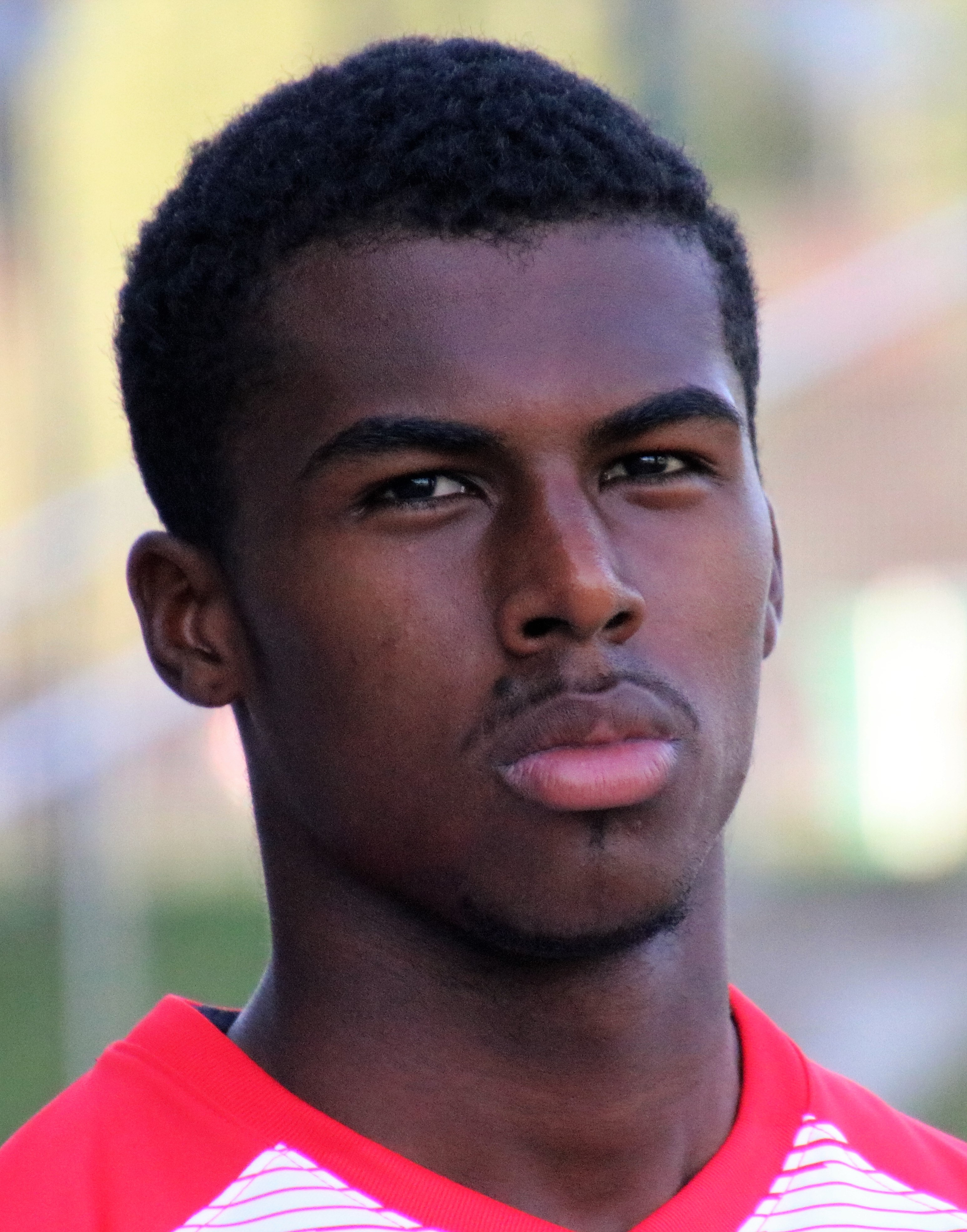

Personal information
- Full name: Wallison Nunes Silva
- Date of birth: 24 June 2001 (age 25)
- Place of birth: São Paulo, Brazil
- Height: 1.77 m (5 ft 10 in)
- Position: Right-back

Team information
- Current team: Avaí
- Number: 2

Youth career
- 2014: Grêmio Osasco
- 2015–2019: Red Bull Brasil
- 2019–2021: Red Bull Salzburg (loan)

Senior career*
Years	Team	Apps	(Gls)
2019–2023	Red Bull Brasil	15	(1)
2019–2021	→ Liefering (loan)	24	(0)
2022	→ Athletic-MG (loan)	10	(0)
2022–2023	→ Botafogo (loan)	0	(0)
2024–2025	Botafogo-SP	59	(2)
2026–	Avaí	35	(2)
- * Club domestic league appearances and goals as of 18 November 2026

Wallison Nunes Silva (born 24 July 2001), simply known as Wallison, is a Brazilian footballer who plays for Avaí. Mainly a right-back, he can also appear on the other flank.

== Career statistics ==
=== Club ===
As of 9 March 2021.

Club	Season	League			State league		Cup		Other		Total	
Club	Season	Division	Apps	Goals	Apps	Goals	Apps	Goals	Apps	Goals	Apps	Goals
Red Bull Brasil	2019	–			0	0	0	0	0	0	0	0
Red Bull Brasil	2020	–			0	0	0	0	0	0	0	0
Red Bull Brasil	2021	–			1 (Note: Appearances in the Campeonato Paulista A2)	0	0	0	0	0	1	0
Red Bull Brasil	Total		0	0	1	0	0	0	0	0	1	0
Liefering (loan)	2019–20	2. Liga	13	0	–		0	0	0	0	13	0
Liefering (loan)	2020–21	2. Liga	11	0	–		0	0	0	0	11	0
Liefering (loan)	Total		24	0	0	0	0	0	0	0	24	0
Career total			24	0	1	0	0	0	0	0	25	0
