= Estádio Santa Cruz =

Soccer stadium in Ribeirão Preto, Brazil

Santa Cruz
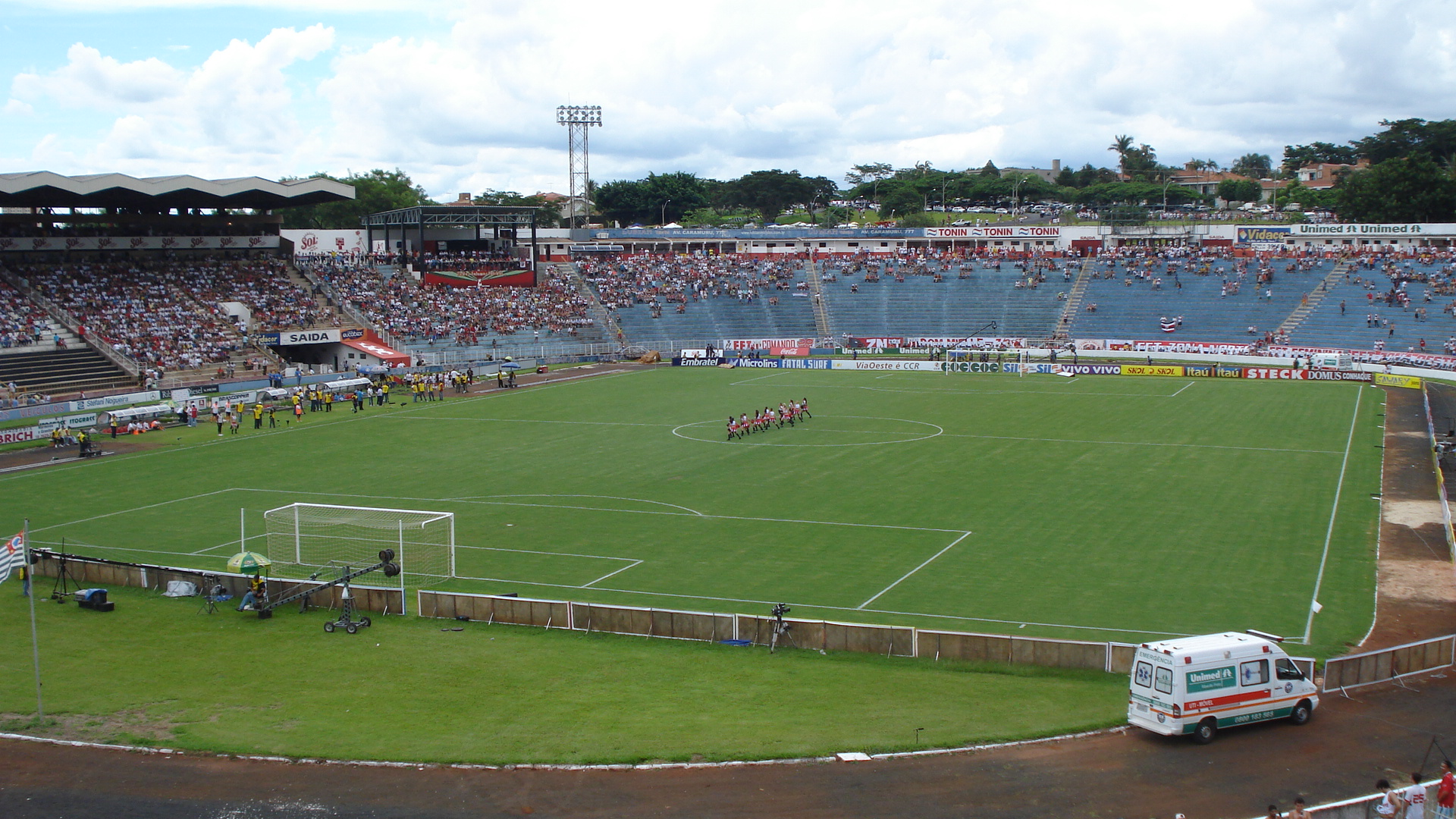
- Sisbrace
- Interactive map of Santa Cruz
- Location: Ribeirão Preto, Brazil
- Coordinates: 21°12′09″S 47°47′21″W
- Owner: Botafogo
- Operator: Botafogo
- Capacity: 29,292
- Surface: Grass
- Field size: 105 by 68 metres (114.8 yd × 74.4 yd)

Construction
- Opened: January 21, 1968

Tenant
- Botafogo Futebol Clube

The Estádio Santa Cruz is a multi-purpose stadium in Ribeirão Preto, São Paulo state, Brazil. Primarily used for football matches, it has a seating capacity of 29,292 and was built in 1968. The stadium is owned by Botafogo Futebol Clube, commonly referred to Botafogo-SP, and its name honors the neighborhood where it was built (Santa Cruz do José Jacques).

== History ==
The inaugural match was played on January 21, 1968, when Botafogo Futebol Clube beat the Romania national football team 6–2. The first goal of the stadium was scored by Botafogo's player Sicupira.

The stadium's attendance record currently stands at 49,358 people, set on March 17, 1993 when the Brazil national football team and the Poland national football team drew 2-2. Previously, the Brazil national football team also played another match in the stadium, against Chile on March 14, 1981, when Brazil won 2-1.

In 1995, the Campeonato Paulista final matches of that year, between Palmeiras and Corinthians were played at the stadium, on July 30 and August 6. The stadium also held one of the final matches of Campeonato Paulista in 2001, between Botafogo Futebol Clube and Corinthians. On November 7, 2015, the stadium held one of the final matches of Campeonato Brasileiro Série D when Botafogo Futebol Clube beat River Atlético Clube by 3-2.

=== FIFA World Cup 2014 ===
In 2014, the stadium Santa Cruz was the training base of France national football team for the 2014 FIFA World Cup in Brazil.

=== Arena Eurobike ===
In June 2019, part of the stadium went through renovations and became known for sponsorship reasons as Arena Eurobike. This a multi-purpose part of the stadium that has bars and restaurants, including a unit of Hard Rock Cafe and a stage for concerts, with capacity for up to 15,000 people.
