= Copa Sul-Sudeste =

- Organiser(s): Brazilian Football Confederation
- Founded: 2026; 0 years ago
- Region: Brazil's South and Southeast
- Teams: 12
- Qualifier for: Copa do Brasil (third round)
- Current champions: Avaí (1st title)
- Most championships: Avaí
- 2026 Copa Sul-Sudeste

The Copa Sul-Sudeste (English: South-Southeast Cup) is a regional competition created in parallel with the return of the Copa Norte and Copa Centro-Oeste, aimed at teams from the South and Southeast regions of Brazil (excluding the state of Espírito Santo which for technical leveling reasons compete in the Copa Centro-Oeste) that are not classified for CONMEBOL competitions (Copa Libertadores and Copa Sudamericana). The objective of the competition is to allocate a spot directly to the third stage of the Copa do Brasil, a competition that has been expanded to 126 clubs.

== Qualification ==
In the initial edition, each state will be entitled to two teams, totaling 12, with the performance of the clubs in state competitions (whether championship or cup) being used as a classification criterion. With no teams in the 2025 Campeonato Brasileiro Série A, the Paraná Football Federation was the first to define the places for the tournament in 2026, indicating Operário Ferroviário, champion of the 2025 Campeonato Paranaense, and the winner of the Taça FPF that is in dispute.

== List of champions ==
Year	Finals			Losing semi-finalists
Year	Winners	Score	Runners-up	Losing semi-finalists
2026	(Santa Catarina (state)); Avaí	3–0; 0–3; Aggregate; 3–3 (5–4 p)	(Santa Catarina (state)); Chapecoense	(São Paulo (state)) Novorizontino and (Rio de Janeiro (state)) Volta Redonda

== See also ==
- Copa Norte
- Copa do Nordeste
- Copa Centro-Oeste
