= Avaí FC =

Brazilian football club

Coordinates: 27°40′00″S 48°31′54″W

Avaí
- Full name: Avaí Futebol Clube
- Nickname: Leão da Ilha
- Founded: 1 September 1923; 103 years ago
- Ground: Estádio da Ressacada
- Capacity: 17,800
- President: Bernardo Pessi
- Head coach: Marquinhos (caretaker)
- League: Campeonato Brasileiro Série B Campeonato Catarinense
- 2025 2025: Série B, 9th of 20; Catarinense, 1st of 12 (champions)
- Website: avai.com.br
Home colours	Away colours	Third colours

Avaí Futebol Clube (Portuguese pronunciation: [avaˈi]) is a Brazilian football team from Florianópolis in Santa Catarina, founded on 1 September 1923. Their home stadium is Estádio Aderbal Ramos da Silva, also known as Ressacada, with a capacity of 17,800. They play in blue and white shirts, shorts and socks.

== History ==
The club was founded after a businessman called Amadeu Horn gave football kits to a group of boys. The boys played a match against a team called Humaitá, and won. On 1 September 1923, at Amadeu Horn's house, the club was founded, known as Avahy Football Club at the time. The team was named Avahy after the Battle of Avay, in the Paraguayan War. In the following year, it became the first Santa Catarina State Championship champion.

Avaí has played in the Brazilian First Division ("Série A") eleven times: 1974, 1976, 1977, 1979, 2009, 2010, 2011, 2015, 2017, 2019 and 2022. In 1998, they won their only national title, the Brazilian Third Division ("Série C"). From 1999 to 2008 and from 2012 to 2014, they played in the Série B with their best campaigns being the third place attained in 2004 (when Avaí reached the Final Four, but could not be promoted to the First Division because only the two best placed teams were promoted) and 2008.

In 2008 they finished 3rd in the championship and were promoted to the First Division for the first time in 30 years. In its first year playing in Série A, Avaí finished in 6th place, thus qualifying for the Copa Sudamericana. This has been the best participation ever by a club from the State of Santa Catarina in the Brazilian first division. The team eventually was relegated in 2011, and returned to the Série A in 2014, when the team won the promotion in the last round. Avaí won the most Santa Catarina State Championship titles in the 20th Century (13), and is currently the all-time record state champions (19), one more than its rival cross-bridge rivals Figueirense.

== Rivals ==
Avaí's greatest rival is Figueirense.

== Club colors and nickname ==
The club colors are blue and white, and it is known as "The Lion of the Island" (because 90% of the Florianópolis territory is established on an island).

== Competitions record ==
=== Série A ===
Year	Position	Year	Position
1974	39th	2010	15th
1976	36th	2011	20th
1977	43rd	2015	17th
1979	90th	2017	18th
2009	6th	2019	20th

=== Série B ===
Year	Position	Year	Position	Year	Position	Year	Position
1980	61st	1999	8th	2004	3rd	2012	7th
1984	32nd	2000	15th	2005	8th	2013	10th
1986	24th	2001	4th	2006	13th	2014	4th
1988	12th	2002	6th	2007	15th	2016	2nd
1989	83rd	2003	11th	2008	3rd	2018	3rd
2020	9th	2021	4th				

=== Série C ===
Year	Position
1987	13th
1995	58th
1996	34th
1997	6th
1998	1st

=== Copa do Brasil ===
Year	Position	Year	Position
1989	18th	2010	13th
1998	38th	2011	4th
1999	23rd	2013	33rd
2000	59th	2014	25th
2007	16th		

=== Copa Sudamericana ===
Year	Position
2010	14th

- 9 seasons in Série A
- 19 seasons in Série B
- 5 seasons in Série C

== Stadium ==
Avaí's stadium is Estádio Aderbal Ramos da Silva (though it's mostly referred to as Ressacada), and it was inaugurated in 1983. It has a maximum capacity of 17,800 people, but its record crowd was 32,000 at the 1988 State Championship final. Before 1983, Avaí's stadium was Estádio Adolfo Konder (which has been subsequently demolished).

== Players ==
=== First team squad ===
As of 12 September 2026

Note: Flags indicate national team as defined under FIFA eligibility rules; some limited exceptions apply. Players may hold more than one non-FIFA nationality.

No.	Pos.	Nation	Player
1	GK	BRA	Igor Bohn
2	DF	BRA	Wallison
3	DF	BRA	Allyson
4	DF	BRA	Gabriel Simples
5	MF	BRA	Romildo Del Piage
7	FW	BRA	Léo Chú (on loan from Alverca)
8	MF	BRA	Luiz Henrique
9	FW	BRA	Léo Gamalho
10	MF	BRA	Jean Lucas
11	FW	BRA	Felipe Vizeu
14	MF	BRA	Daniel Penha (on loan from Atlético Mineiro)
15	DF	BRA	Guilherme Aquino (on loan from Coritiba)
17	FW	BRA	Juan Rocha (on loan from Tombense)
18	MF	BRA	Hyan (on loan from Santos)
19	FW	BRA	Caio Suassuna (on loan from Bahia)
20	FW	BRA	Isaías
21	GK	BRA	Otávio Passos

No.	Pos.	Nation	Player
22	DF	BRA	João Vitor (on loan from Portuguesa)
23	FW	BRA	Gabriel Cipriano
25	MF	BRA	Paulo Vitor (on loan from Atlético Mineiro)
27	MF	BRA	Pedro Cuiabá
35	DF	BRA	Pedrão
36	DF	BRA	Douglas Teixeira (on loan from Barra-SC)
37	MF	BRA	Rildo (on loan from Santa Clara)
38	DF	BRA	Jefferson Maciel
40	DF	BRA	Reynaldo
56	DF	BRA	William
59	FW	BRA	Filipinho (on loan from RB Bragantino)
66	DF	BRA	Mateus Quaresma
70	FW	BRA	Gaspar
77	MF	BRA	Zé Ricardo (captain)
90	FW	BRA	Kevin
94	GK	BRA	Bruno Ferreira
95	MF	BRA	Wenderson (on loan from Elfsborg)

=== Youth team ===
Note: Flags indicate national team as defined under FIFA eligibility rules; some limited exceptions apply. Players may hold more than one non-FIFA nationality.

No.	Pos.	Nation	Player
22	DF	BRA	Kauã Fernandes
33	GK	BRA	Léo

No.	Pos.	Nation	Player
72	DF	BRA	Kauã Dias
91	DF	BRA	Vinicius Marques

=== Out on loan ===
Note: Flags indicate national team as defined under FIFA eligibility rules; some limited exceptions apply. Players may hold more than one non-FIFA nationality.

No.	Pos.	Nation	Player
43	FW	BRA	Thayllon (on loan at LAFC until 30 June 2027)
—	FW	BRA	Renanzinho (on loan at Confiança until 30 November 2026)

=== Retired numbers ===
No.	Player	Nationality	Position	Reason
88	Cléber Santana	Brazil	Midfielder	Posthumous

== Technical staff ==
Position	Name
Head coach	(Brazil) Jair Ventura

== Honours ==
=== Official tournaments ===
National
Competitions	Titles	Seasons
Campeonato Brasileiro Série C	1	1998
Regional
Competitions	Titles	Seasons
Copa Sul-Sudeste	1	2026
State
Competitions	Titles	Seasons
Campeonato Catarinense	19	1924, 1926, 1927, 1928, 1930, 1942, 1943, 1944, 1945, 1973, 1975, 1988, 1997, 2009, 2010, 2012, 2019, 2021, 2025
Copa Santa Catarina	1	1995
Recopa Catarinense	1	2026
Campeonato Catarinense Série B	1	1994

- record

=== Others tournaments ===
==== International ====
- International Triangular Tournament (1): 1975

==== Inter-state ====
- Torneio Integração Paraná-Santa Catarina (1): 1972
- Torneio Ivo Reis Montenegro (1): 1975

==== State ====
- Taça Governador do Estado (2): 1983, 1985
- Torneio Início do Campeonato Catarinense (3): 1925, 1926, 1936

==== City ====
- Campeonato Citadino de Florianópolis (20): 1924, 1926, 1927, 1928, 1930, 1933, 1938, 1940, 1942, 1943, 1944, 1945, 1949, 1951, 1952, 1953, 1958, 1960, 1963, 1995
- Torneio Início de Florianópolis (13): 1925, 1926, 1933, 1936, 1938, 1942, 1943, 1944, 1946, 1955, 1958, 1960, 1963

=== Runners-up ===
- Campeonato Brasileiro Série B (1): 2016
- Campeonato Catarinense (10): 1925, 1940, 1949, 1951, 1972, 1977, 1985, 1992, 1999, 2017
- Recopa Catarinense (2): 2020, 2022

=== Youth team ===
- Campeonato Brasileiro Sub-20 Série B: 2025
- Copa Votorantim Sub-15 (2): 2019, 2020

== Affiliated clubs ==
The following club is currently affiliated with Avaí FC:

- (India) Odisha FC (2021–present)

== See also ==
- Avaí FC (women)
