= 2024 Clube Náutico Capibaribe season =

Náutico
2024 season
- Chairman: Bruno Becker
- Manager: Allan Aal; Mazola Júnior; Bruno Pivetti
- Stadium: Estádio dos Aflitos
- Série C: 9th
- Pernambucano: Runners-up
- Copa do Nordeste: Quarter-final
- Top goalscorer: League: Paulo Sérgio (10); All: Paulo Sérgio (16)
Home colours	Away colours

The 2024 season was Náutico's 124th season in the club's history. Náutico competed in the Campeonato Pernambucano, Copa do Nordeste and Série C.

== Squad ==
As of 16 November 2023

Note: Flags indicate national team as defined under FIFA eligibility rules; some limited exceptions apply. Players may hold more than one non-FIFA nationality.

No.	Pos.	Nation	Player
—	GK	BRA	Vagner
—	GK	BRA	Bruno Lopes
—	DF	BRA	Danilo Cardoso
—	DF	BRA	Denilson
—	DF	BRA	Diego
—	DF	BRA	Diego Ferreira (on loan from Tombense)
—	DF	BRA	Joécio
—	DF	BRA	Diego Matos
—	DF	BRA	Odivan
—	DF	BRA	Richardson (on loan from ABC)
—	MF	BRA	Elton

No.	Pos.	Nation	Player
—	MF	BRA	Alexandre Tam
—	MF	BRA	Fernando
—	MF	BRA	Lima (on loan from Guarani)
—	MF	BRA	Jean Mangabeira
—	MF	BRA	Nathan (on loan from Fluminense)
—	MF	BRA	Thiaguinho
—	FW	BRA	Kayon
—	FW	BRA	Maxwell
—	FW	BRA	Ribamar
—	FW	BRA	Richarles

== Statistics ==
=== Overall ===
Games played	42 (14 Pernambucano, 9 Copa do Nordeste, 19 Série C)
Games won	15 (8 Pernambucano, 1 Copa do Nordeste, 6 Série C)
Games drawn	14 (3 Pernambucano, 4 Copa do Nordeste, 7 Série C)
Games lost	13 (3 Pernambucano, 4 Copa do Nordeste, 6 Série C)
Goals scored	56
Goals conceded	43
Goal difference	+13
Best results (goal difference)	4–0 (H) v Figueirense – Série C – 2024.07.14
Worst result (goal difference)	0–3 (A) v Bahia – Copa do Nordeste – 2024.04.10
Top scorer	Paulo Sérgio (16)

Source: Náutico official website

=== Goalscorers ===
Place	Position	Nationality	Number	Name	Campeonato Pernambucano	Copa do Nordeste	Série C	Total
1	FW	(Brazil)	9	Paulo Sérgio	3	3	10	16
2	FW	(Brazil)	12	Gustavo Maia	0	0	6	6
2	MF	(Brazil)	20	Patrick Allan	4	0	2	6
3	FW	(Brazil)	80	Bruno Mezenga	0	0	5	5
4	MF	(Brazil)	8	Marco Antônio	0	0	3	3
5	FW	(Brazil)	10	Evandro	1	1	0	2
5	MF	(Brazil)	96	Felipe Ferreira	0	0	2	2
5	FW	(Colombia)	77	Ray Vanegas	2	0	0	2
5	FW	(Brazil)	35	Thalissinho	1	0	1	2
6	DF	(Brazil)	12	Islan	0	0	1	1
6	MF	(Brazil)	7	Júlio César	1	0	0	1
6	FW	(Uruguay)	21	Leandro Barcia	0	1	0	1
6	DF	(Brazil)	6	Luiz Paulo	0	0	1	1
6	MF	(Brazil)	33	Marcos Júnior	1	0	0	1
6	DF	(Brazil)	4	Rafael Vaz	0	0	1	1
6	MF	(Brazil)	13	Reinaldo Kauan	1	0	0	1
6	MF	(Brazil)	29	Renato Alves	0	0	1	1
6	DF	(Brazil)	37	Robson Reis	1	0	0	1
6	MF	(Brazil)	25	Sousa	0	1	0	1
6	MF	(Brazil)	23	Thiago Lopes	0	0	1	1
				Own goals	0	1	0	1
				Total	15	7	34	56

=== Managers performance ===
Name	Nationality	From	To	P	W	D	L	GF	GA	Avg%	Ref
Allan Aal	Brazil	14 January 2024	30 March 2024	21	9	6	6	22	15	52%	
Mazola Júnior	Brazil	6 April 2024	9 June 2024	9	2	3	4	12	13	33%	
Bruno Pivetti	Brazil	17 June 2024	24 August 2024	12	4	5	3	22	15	47%	

== Official Competitions ==
=== Campeonato Pernambucano ===
==== First stage ====
14 January 2024 1	Náutico	2–0	Flamengo de Arcoverde	Recife
16:00 (UTC-3)	Reinaldo Kauan 22'; Ray Vanegas 90+2'	Report		Stadium: Estádio Eládio de Barros Carvalho (Aflitos); Attendance: 10,783; Referee: Anderson Marques

18 January 2024 2	Afogados da Ingazeira	0–1	Náutico	Afogados da Ingazeira
19:00 (UTC-3)		Report	Patrick Allan 53'	Stadium: Estádio Valdemar Viana de Araújo; Attendance: 1,247; Referee: Diego Fernando Silva de Lima

21 January 2024 3	Náutico	0–0	Maguary	Recife
17:00 (UTC-3)		Report		Stadium: Estádio Eládio de Barros Carvalho (Aflitos); Attendance: 9,431; Referee: Deborah Cecília

24 January 2024 4	Central	2–2	Náutico	Caruaru
16:30 (UTC-3)	Moacir 36'; Joelson 48'	Report	Evandro 1'; Robson Reis 79'	Stadium: Estádio Luiz José de Lacerda (Lacerdão); Attendance: 4,130; Referee: José Woshington

27 January 2024 5	Santa Cruz	1–2	Náutico	Recife
16:30 (UTC-3)	João Diogo 22'	Report	Marcos Júnior 3'; Paulo Sérgio 83'	Stadium: Estádio José do Rego Maciel (Arruda); Attendance: 16,003; Referee: Diego Fernando Silva de Lima

31 January 2024 6	Náutico	1–0	Petrolina	Recife
21:00 (UTC-3)	Ray Vanegas 54'	Report		Stadium: Estádio Eládio de Barros Carvalho (Aflitos); Attendance: 5,557; Referee: Paulo Belence Alves dos Prazeres Filho

7 February 2024 7	Náutico	3–0	Porto	Recife
19:00 (UTC-3)	Paulo Sérgio 29'; Júlio César 45+1'; Thalissinho 90+3'	Report		Stadium: Estádio Eládio de Barros Carvalho (Aflitos); Attendance: 3,683; Referee: Hugo Soares Dias Figueiredo

18 February 2024 8	Retrô	1–0	Náutico	São Lourenço da Mata
17:00 (UTC-3)	Giva 53'	Report		Stadium: Estádio Governador Carlos Wilson Campos (Arena Pernambuco); Attendance: 3,096; Referee: Gilberto Rodrigues Castro Júnior

24 February 2024 9	Náutico	1–0	Sport	Recife
16:30 (UTC-3)	Patrick Allan 58'	Report		Stadium: Estádio Eládio de Barros Carvalho (Aflitos); Attendance: 10,318; Referee: Paulo Belence Alves dos Prazeres Filho

==== Second stage ====
1 March 2024	Náutico	2–0	Afogados da Ingazeira	Recife
20:00 (UTC-3)	Patrick Allan 45+3'; Paulo Sérgio 90+5' (pen.)	Report		Stadium: Estádio Eládio de Barros Carvalho (Aflitos); Attendance: 10,444; Referee: Anderson Luis Marques

==== Semi-finals ====
10 March 2024	Náutico	1–0	Retrô	Recife
16:00 (UTC-3)	Patrick Allan 46'	Report		Stadium: Estádio Eládio de Barros Carvalho (Aflitos); Attendance: 14,166; Referee: Paulo Belence Alves dos Prazeres Filho

17 March 2024	Retrô	1–0 (3–4 p)	Náutico	São Lourenço da Mata
16:00 (UTC-3)	Franklin Mascote 76'	Report		Stadium: Estádio Governador Carlos Wilson Campos (Arena Pernambuco); Attendance: 5,003; Referee: Rodrigo Pereira
	Penalties
	Jean (penalty scored); Edson Lucas (penalty missed); Alencar (penalty scored); Franklin Mascote (penalty missed); Fernandinho (penalty scored); Israel (penalty missed)		(penalty scored) Paulo Sérgio; (penalty scored) Patrick Allan; (penalty scored) Rafael Vaz; (penalty missed) Marcos Júnior; (penalty missed) Fernandinho; (penalty scored) Robson Reis

==== Finals ====
30 March 2024	Náutico	0–2	Sport	Recife
16:30 (UTC-3)		Report	Rafael Thyere 56'; Gustavo Coutinho 66'	Stadium: Estádio Eládio de Barros Carvalho (Aflitos); Attendance: 13,603; Referee: Diego Fernando

6 April 2024	Sport	0–0	Náutico	São Lourenço da Mata
16:30 (UTC-3)		Report		Stadium: Estádio Governador Carlos Wilson Campos (Arena Pernambuco); Attendance: 45,500; Referee: Rodrigo Pereira

==== Record ====
Final Position	Points	Matches	Wins	Draws	Losses	Goals For	Goals Away	Avg%
2nd	27	14	8	3	3	15	7	64%

=== Copa do Nordeste ===
==== Group stage ====
3 February 2024 1	Náutico	0–1	Botafogo–PB	Recife
16:00 (UTC-3)		Report	Dudu 37'	Stadium: Estádio Eládio de Barros Carvalho (Aflitos); Attendance: 7,003; Referee: Márcio dos Santos Oliveira

10 February 2024 2	Maranhão	1–3	Náutico	São Luís
19:00 (UTC-3)	Maicon 68'	Report	Paulo Sérgio 6', 16' (pen.); Barcia 43'	Stadium: Estádio Governador João Castelo (Castelão); Attendance: 412; Referee: Afro Rocha de Carvalho Filho

14 February 2024 3	Náutico	0–0	Ceará	Recife
21:30 (UTC-3)		Report		Stadium: Estádio Eládio de Barros Carvalho (Aflitos); Attendance: 6,008; Referee: Paulo José Souza Mourão

21 February 2024 4	Vitória	1–1	Náutico	Salvador
19:00 (UTC-3)	Daniel Júnior 90+3'	Report	Evandro 46'	Stadium: Estádio Manoel Barradas (Barradão); Attendance: 10,025; Referee: Luciano da Silva Miranda Filho

5 March 2024 5	Náutico	0–1	River	Recife
19:00 (UTC-3)		Report	Felipe Pará 70' (pen.)	Stadium: Estádio Eládio de Barros Carvalho (Aflitos); Attendance: 5,319; Referee: Wiomar Santana de Oliveira

20 March 2024 6	Sport	2–2	Náutico	São Lourenço da Mata
21:30 (UTC-3)	Ortiz 31'; Romarinho 71'	Report	Sousa 27'; Nassom 90+4' (o.g.)	Stadium: Estádio Governador Carlos Wilson Campos (Arena Pernambuco); Attendance: 0 Referee: Emerson Ricardo de Almeida Andrade

24 March 2024 7	Náutico	1–1	CRB	Recife
19:00 (UTC-3)	Paulo Sérgio 55'	Report	Gegê 45+1'	Stadium: Estádio Eládio de Barros Carvalho (Aflitos); Attendance: 5,785; Referee: Antonio Dib Moraes de Sousa

27 March 2024 8	América–RN	1–0	Náutico	Natal
21:30 (UTC-3)	Rafinha 90+1'	Report		Stadium: Arena das Dunas; Attendance: 2,044; Referee: Rafael Carlos Salgueiro Lima

==== Quarter-final ====
10 April 2024	Bahia	3–0	Náutico	Salvador
21:30 (UTC-3)	Thaciano 65'; Estupiñán 79'; Jean Lucas 87'	Report		Stadium: Casa de Apostas (Arena Fonte Nova); Attendance: 22,671; Referee: Paulo José Souza Mourão

==== Record ====
Final Position	Points	Matches	Wins	Draws	Losses	Goals For	Goals Away	Avg%
8th	7	9	1	4	4	7	11	26%

=== Série C ===
==== First stage ====
21 April 2024 1	Náutico	1–1	São Bernardo	Recife
16:30 (UTC-3)	Paulo Sérgio 85'	Report	Silvinho 64' (pen.)	Stadium: Estádio Eládio de Barros Carvalho (Aflitos); Attendance: 145; Referee: André Ricardo Martins

27 April 2024 2	ABC	0–3	Náutico	Natal
17:00 (UTC-3)		Report	Gustavo Maia 32'; Paulo Sérgio 60'; Thiago Lopes 79'	Stadium: Estádio Maria Lamas Farache (Frasqueirão); Attendance: 4,232; Referee: Hieger Tulio Cardoso

12 May 2024 4	Ferroviária	2–1	Náutico	Araraquara
16:30 (UTC-3)	Juninho 30'; Pedro Paulo 90+7'	Report	Thalissinho 90+5'	Stadium: Estádio Municipal Olivério Bazzani Filho (Fonte Luminosa); Attendance: 970; Referee: Paulo Henrique de Melo Salmazio

18 May 2024 5	Volta Redonda	2–1	Náutico	Volta Redonda
17:00 (UTC-3)	Ítalo Carvalho 10'; Juninho Monteiro 35'	Report	Paulo Sérgio 68'	Stadium: Estádio Municipal General Sylvio (Raulino de Oliveira); Attendance: 514; Referee: Raimundo Rodrigues de Oliveira Junior

25 May 2024 6	Náutico	4–1	Remo	Recife
17:00 (UTC-3)	Gustavo Maia 12'; Paulo Sérgio 45+3', 54'; Rafael Vaz 81'	Report	Marco Antônio 48'	Stadium: Estádio Eládio de Barros Carvalho (Aflitos); Attendance: 6,677; Referee: Fabiano Monteiro dos Santos

3 June 2024 7	São José	2–0	Náutico	Porto Alegre
20:00 (UTC-3)	Fredson 45+3'; Marcos Calazans 73'	Report		Stadium: Estádio Francisco Novelletto Neto (Passo D'Areia); Attendance: 170; Referee: Olivaldo Jose Alves Moraes

9 June 2024 8	Náutico	2–2	Caxias do Sul	Recife
19:00 (UTC-3)	Paulo Sérgio 47'; Gustavo Maia 90+1'	Report	Álvaro 57'; Gabriel Santos 74'	Stadium: Estádio Eládio de Barros Carvalho (Aflitos); Attendance: 4,566; Referee: Antônio Dib Moraes de Sousa

17 June 2024 9	Náutico	0–1	Floresta	Recife
20:00 (UTC-3)		Report	Buba 18'	Stadium: Estádio Eládio de Barros Carvalho (Aflitos); Attendance: 4,169; Referee: Afro Rocha de Carvalho Filho

24 June 2024 10	Aparecidense	2–2	Náutico	Aparecida de Goiânia
20:00 (UTC-3)	Rhuan 33'; Rubens 58'	Report	Paulo Sérgio 35'; Renato Alves 45+4'	Stadium: Estádio Municipal Annibal Batista de Toledo; Attendance: 392; Referee: Ivan da Silva Guimaraes Junior

1 July 2024 11	Náutico	2–1	Confiança	Recife
20:00 (UTC-3)	Bruno Mezenga 56', 82'	Report	Lucas Rian 33'	Stadium: Estádio Eládio de Barros Carvalho (Aflitos); Attendance: 6,142; Referee: Bruno Nogueira Prado

7 July 2024 12	Tombense	0–0	Náutico	Tombos
19:00 (UTC-3)		Report		Stadium: Estádio Antônio Guimarães de Almeida; Attendance: 624; Referee: Rodrigo da Fonseca Silva

14 July 2024 13	Náutico	4–0	Figueirense	Recife
19:00 (UTC-3)	Bruno Mezenga 5'; Patrick Allan 45+2'; Paulo Sérgio 60'; Felipe Ferreira 85'	Report		Stadium: Estádio Eládio de Barros Carvalho (Aflitos); Attendance: 7,477; Referee: Paulo José Souza Mourão

21 July 2024 14	Náutico	2–2	Athletic	Recife
19:00 (UTC-3)	Gustavo Maia 55'; Patrick Allan 75'	Report	Jonathas de Jesus 12'; Neto Costa 79'	Stadium: Estádio Eládio de Barros Carvalho (Aflitos); Attendance: 14,620; Referee: Murilo Ugolini Klein

27 July 2024 15	Sampaio Corrêa	1–1	Náutico	São Luís
17:00 (UTC-3)	Cavi 14'	Report	Luiz Paulo 2'	Stadium: Estádio Governador João Castelo (Castelão); Attendance: 1,326; Referee: Paulo Henrique Schleich Vollkopf

31 July 2024 3*	Náutico	1–2	Ypiranga	Recife
19:00 (UTC-3)	Paulo Sérgio 15'	Report	Zé Vitor 47'; Anderson Uchôa 66'	Stadium: Estádio Eládio de Barros Carvalho (Aflitos); Attendance: 9,549; Referee: Tarcizo Pinheiro Caetano

4 August 2024 16	CSA	2–2	Náutico	Maceió
19:00 (UTC-3)	Roberto 69'; Marco Antônio 90+6' (o.g.)	Report	Felipe Ferreira 36'; Bruno Mezenga 83'	Stadium: Estádio Rei Pelé; Attendance: 8,064; Referee: Alisson Sidnei Furtado

11 August 2024 17	Náutico	2–0	Botafogo–PB	Recife
19:00 (UTC-3)	Marco Antônio 16'; Gustavo Maia 83'	Report		Stadium: Estádio Eládio de Barros Carvalho (Aflitos); Attendance: 5,065; Referee: Wagner Francisco Silva Souza

17 August 2024 18	Náutico	4–1	Ferroviário	Recife
17:00 (UTC-3)	Marco Antônio 20', 48'; Paulo Sérgio 26'; Islan 44'	Report	Ciel 55'	Stadium: Estádio Eládio de Barros Carvalho (Aflitos); Attendance: 11,006; Referee: Antônio Dib Moraes

24 August 2024 19	Londrina	3–2	Náutico	Londrina
17:00 (UTC-3)	Rafael Longuine 12'; Everton Moraes 45'; Maurício 90'	Report	Bruno Mezenga 17'; Gustavo Maia 57'	Stadium: Estádio Jacy Scaff (do Café); Attendance: 5,849; Referee: Luiz Flávio de Oliveira

==== Record ====
Final Position	Points	Matches	Wins	Draws	Losses	Goals For	Goals Away	Avg%
9th	25	19	6	7	6	34	25	44%

(*) Postponed matches due to changes in competition schedules
