= 2025 Clube Náutico Capibaribe season =

Náutico
2025 season
- Chairman: Bruno Becker
- Manager: Marquinhos Santos; Hélio dos Anjos
- Stadium: Estádio dos Aflitos
- Série C: 3rd (Promoted)
- Pernambucano: 5th
- Copa do Brasil: Third round
- Copa do Nordeste: Group stage
- Top goalscorer: League: Marco Antônio (5); All: Paulo Sérgio (8)
Home colours	Away colours	Third colours

The 2025 season was Náutico's 125th season in the club's history. Náutico competed in the Campeonato Pernambucano, Copa do Nordeste, Série C and Copa do Brasil.

== Statistics ==
=== Overall ===
Games played	46 (10 Pernambucano, 7 Copa do Nordeste, 4 Copa do Brasil, 25 Série C)
Games won	21 (5 Pernambucano, 2 Copa do Nordeste, 2 Copa do Brasil, 12 Série C)
Games drawn	12 (2 Pernambucano, 2 Copa do Nordeste, 0 Copa do Brasil, 8 Série C)
Games lost	13 (3 Pernambucano, 3 Copa do Nordeste, 2 Copa do Brasil, 5 Série C)
Goals scored	58
Goals conceded	36
Goal difference	+22
Best result (goal difference)	4–0 (H) v Afogados da Ingazeira – Pernambucano – 2025.02.09; 4–0 (A) v Santa Cruz de Natal – Pernambucano – 2025.02.19; 4–0 (A) v Ypiranga – Série C – 2025.05.17
Worst result (goal difference)	1–4 (A) v CSA – Copa do Nordeste – 2025.02.26
Top scorer	Paulo Sérgio (8)

Source: Náutico official website

=== Goalscorers ===
Place	Pos.	Nat.	No.	Name	Campeonato Pernambucano	Copa do Nordeste	Copa do Brasil	Série C	Total
1	FW	(Brazil)	9	Paulo Sérgio	2	1	1	4	8
2	MF	(Brazil)	20	Patrick Allan	3	1	0	3	7
3	FW	(Brazil)	80	Bruno Mezenga	1	1	1	3	6
3	FW	(Brazil)	7	Hélio Borges	1	0	2	3	6
3	MF	(Brazil)	8	Marco Antônio	1	0	0	5	6
4	FW	(Nigeria)	34	Samuel Otusanya	2	1	0	2	5
5	MF	(Brazil)	5	Igor Pereira	1	0	0	1	2
5	FW	(Brazil)	27	Kauan Maranhão	2	0	0	0	2
5	MF	(Brazil)	15	Kayon	1	0	1	0	2
5	DF	(Brazil)	17	Marcos Ytalo	1	0	1	0	2
5	MF	(Brazil)	7	Vinícius	0	0	0	2	2
6	DF	(Brazil)	2	Arnaldo	0	0	0	1	1
6	MF	(Brazil)	18	Auremir	0	0	0	1	1
6	MF	(Brazil)	10	Caio Vitor	0	0	1	0	1
6	DF	(Brazil)	33	Carlinhos	0	0	0	1	1
6	FW	(Brazil)	70	Igor Bolt	0	0	0	1	1
6	FW	(Brazil)	48	Leandro Kauã	0	1	0	0	1
6	FW	(Brazil)	38	Léo Mago	0	0	0	1	1
6	MF	(Brazil)	10	Lucas Cardoso	0	0	0	1	1
6	MF	(Brazil)	25	Sousa	0	0	1	0	1
6	FW	(Brazil)	35	Thalissinho	0	0	0	1	1
				Total	15	5	8	30	58

=== Managers performance ===
Name	From	To	P	W	D	L	GF	GA	Avg%	Ref
(Brazil) Marquinhos Santos	11 January 2025	13 April 2025	16	8	3	5	24	16	56%	
(Brazil) André Caldas (c)	12 February 2025	22 February 2025	3	1	1	1	2	2	44%	
(Brazil) Hélio dos Anjos	19 April 2025	11 October 2025	26	11	8	7	31	18	52%	
(Brazil) Guilherme dos Anjos (c)	26 July 2025		1	1	0	0	1	0	100%	

(c) Indicates the caretaker manager

== Official Competitions ==
=== Campeonato Pernambucano ===
==== First stage ====
11 January 2025 1	Náutico	1–1	Petrolina	Recife
16:30 (UTC-3)	Kauan Maranhão 87'	Report	Yonder Silva 24'	Stadium: Estádio Eládio de Barros Carvalho (Aflitos); Attendance: 9,164; Referee: Rodrigo Pereira

15 January 2025 2	Náutico	3–2	Jaguar	Recife
20:00 (UTC-3)	Kauan Maranhão 35'; Otusanya 65'; Bruno Mezenga 89'	Report	Pedro Maycon 68', 90'	Stadium: Estádio Eládio de Barros Carvalho (Aflitos); Attendance: 6,519; Referee: Nairon Pereira de Lira

19 January 2025 3	Central	2–1	Náutico	Caruaru
18:00 (UTC-3)	Eudair 17' (pen.); Elivelton 71'	Report	Patrick Allan 90+5'	Stadium: Estádio Luiz José de Lacerda (Lacerdão); Attendance: 3,015; Referee: Tiago Nascimento dos Santos

25 January 2025 4	Náutico	2–1	Santa Cruz	Recife
16:30 (UTC-3)	Patrick Allan 27'; Paulo Sérgio 76'	Report	Thiaguinho 28'	Stadium: Estádio Eládio de Barros Carvalho (Aflitos); Attendance: 13,128; Referee: Deborah Cecilia Cruz Correia

30 January 2025 5	Náutico	2–0	Maguary	Recife
20:00 (UTC-3)	Marco Antônio 27'; Paulo Sérgio 76'	Report		Stadium: Estádio Eládio de Barros Carvalho (Aflitos); Attendance: 6,693; Referee: Diego Fernando Silva de Lima

2 February 2025 6	Retrô	1–0	Náutico	São Lourenço da Mata
17:00 (UTC-3)	Franklin Mascote 60'	Report		Stadium: Estádio Governador Carlos Wilson Campos (Arena Pernambuco); Attendance: 2,565; Referee: Rodrigo Pereira

9 February 2025 7	Náutico	4–0	Afogados da Ingazeira	Recife
16:00 (UTC-3)	Kayon 7'; Hélio Borges 59'; Patrick Allan 84' (pen.); Marcos Ytalo 88'	Report		Stadium: Estádio Eládio de Barros Carvalho (Aflitos); Attendance: 4,886; Referee: José Woshington da Silva

15 February 2025 8	Sport	1–2	Náutico	Recife
16:30 (UTC-3)	Paciência 90+10'	Report	Otusanya 16'; Igor Pereira 90+4'	Stadium: Estádio Adelmar da Costa Carvalho (Ilha do Retiro); Attendance: 13,023; Referee: Diego Fernando

22 February 2025 9	Decisão	1–0	Náutico	Sertânia
16:30 (UTC-3)	Bambam 75'	Report		Stadium: Estádio Municipal Odilon Ferreira dos Santos; Attendance: 860; Referee: Michelangelo Almeida

==== Second stage ====
3 March 2025	Náutico	0–0 (3–5 p)	Retrô	Recife
16:00 (UTC-3)		Report		Stadium: Estádio Eládio de Barros Carvalho (Aflitos); Attendance: 0 Referee: Wilton Pereira Sampaio
	Penalties
	Paulo Sérgio (penalty scored); Bruno Mezenga (penalty missed); Igor Fernandes (penalty scored); Hélio Borges (penalty scored)		(penalty scored) Júnior Fialho; (penalty scored) Ericson; (penalty scored) Radsley; (penalty scored) Lucas Grafite; (penalty scored) Richard Franco

==== Record ====
Final Position	Points	Matches	Wins	Draws	Losses	Goals For	Goals Away	Avg%
5th	17	10	5	2	3	15	9	56%

=== Copa do Nordeste ===
==== Group stage ====
22 January 2025 1	Náutico	1–0	Ceará	Recife
21:30 (UTC-3)	Paulo Sérgio 57'	Report		Stadium: Estádio Eládio de Barros Carvalho (Aflitos); Attendance: 5,687; Referee: Emerson Souza Silva

5 February 2025 2	Confiança	1–0	Náutico	Aracaju
19:00 (UTC-3)	Breiner Camilo 77'	Report		Stadium: Estádio Lourival Baptista (Batistão); Attendance: 2,196; Referee: Douglas Magno de Melo Pereira

12 February 2025 3	Náutico	0–0	Juazeirense	Recife
21:30 (UTC-3)		Report		Stadium: Estádio Eládio de Barros Carvalho (Aflitos); Attendance: 4,217; Referee: Ruthyanna Camila Medeiros da Silva

26 February 2025 4	CSA	4–1	Náutico	Maceió
21:30 (UTC-3)	Guilherme Cachoeira 7', 26'; Tiago Marques 50'; Ramon Batista 83'	Report	Otusanya	Stadium: Estádio Rei Pelé; Attendance: 4,993; Referee: Tarcísio Flores da Silva

6 March 2025 5	Sampaio Corrêa	1–1	Náutico	São Luís
19:00 (UTC-3)	Alan James 10'	Report	Leandro Kauã 63'	Stadium: Estádio Governador João Castelo (Castelão); Attendance: 336; Referee: Diego da Silva Castro

18 March 2025 6	Náutico	1–0	América de Natal	Recife
19:00 (UTC-3)	Patrick Allan 45'	Report		Stadium: Estádio Eládio de Barros Carvalho (Aflitos); Attendance: 6,393; Referee: Fábio Augusto Santos Sá Júnior

7 June 2025 7	Bahia	3–1	Náutico	Salvador
17:30 (UTC-3)	Tiago 29', 58'; Araújo 79'	Report	Bruno Mezenga 8'	Stadium: Casa de Apostas (Arena Fonte Nova); Attendance: 22,933; Referee: Fábio Augusto Santos Sá Júnior

==== Record ====
Final Position	Points	Matches	Wins	Draws	Losses	Goals For	Goals Away	Avg%
11th	8	7	2	2	3	5	9	38%

=== Copa do Brasil ===
==== First round ====
19 February 2025	Santa Cruz de Natal	0–4	Náutico	Natal
19:00 (UTC-3)		Report	Paulo Sérgio 28'; Sousa 69'; Bruno Mezenga 79'; Kayon 87'	Stadium: Estádio Maria Lamas Farache (Frasqueirão); Attendance: 336; Referee: Fernando Antônio Mendes de Salles Nascimento Filho

==== Second round ====
12 March 2025	Vitória	0–2	Náutico	Salvador
19:00 (UTC-3)		Report	Hélio Borges 28'; Marcos Ytalo 36'	Stadium: Estádio Manoel Barradas (Barradão); Attendance: 16,943; Referee: Paulo César Zanovelli da Silva

==== Third round ====
29 April 2025	São Paulo	2–1	Náutico	São Paulo
21:30 (UTC-3)	Luciano 21', 46'	Report	Caio Vitor 17'	Stadium: Estádio Cícero Pompeu de Toledo (Morumbi); Attendance: 29,291; Referee: Sávio Pereira Sampaio

20 May 2025	Náutico	1–2	São Paulo	Recife
21:30 (UTC-3)	Hélio Borges 83'	Report	Luciano 4'; Rodriguinho 75'	Stadium: Estádio Eládio de Barros Carvalho (Aflitos); Attendance: 16,832; Referee: Jonathan Benkenstein Pinheiro

==== Record ====
Final Position	Points	Matches	Wins	Draws	Losses	Goals For	Goals Away	Avg%
30th	6	4	2	0	2	8	4	50%

=== Série C ===
==== First stage ====
13 April 2025 1	Itabaiana	2–1	Náutico	Itabaiana
16:00 (UTC-3)	Wendel 52'; João Cabral 72'	Report	Hélio Borges 34'	Stadium: Estádio Etelvino Mendonça; Attendance: 2,864; Referee: Anderson Ribeiro Gonçalves

19 April 2025 2	Náutico	0–0	Botafogo–PB	Recife
17:00 (UTC-3)		Report		Stadium: Estádio Eládio de Barros Carvalho (Aflitos); Attendance: 6,980; Referee: Emerson Souza Silva

26 April 2025 3	CSA	2–1	Náutico	Maceió
19:30 (UTC-3)	Tiago Marques 25'; Igor Bahia 76'	Report	Paulo Sérgio 36'	Stadium: Estádio Rei Pelé; Attendance: 6,602; Referee: Afro Rocha de Carvalho Filho

4 May 2025 4	Náutico	0–0	Brusque	Recife
19:00 (UTC-3)		Report		Stadium: Estádio Eládio de Barros Carvalho (Aflitos); Attendance: 8,231; Referee: Josué Reis de Jesus Júnior

10 May 2025 5	Náutico	2–0	Confiança	Recife
17:00 (UTC-3)	Marco Antônio 19'; Thalissinho 34'	Report		Stadium: Estádio Eládio de Barros Carvalho (Aflitos); Attendance: 5,577; Referee: Afro Rocha de Carvalho Filho

17 May 2025 6	Ypiranga	0–4	Náutico	Erechim
19:30 (UTC-3)		Report	Marco Antônio 14'; Auremir 33'; Bruno Mezenga 72'; Léo Mago 88' (pen.)	Stadium: Estádio Olímpico Colosso da Lagoa; Attendance: 964; Referee: Luiz Augusto Silveira Tisne

24 May 2025 7	Náutico	0–1	Ponte Preta	Recife
17:00 (UTC-3)		Report	Everton Brito 87'	Stadium: Estádio Eládio de Barros Carvalho (Aflitos); Attendance: 9,500; Referee: Arthur Gomes Rabelo

31 May 2025 8	ABC	0–0	Náutico	Natal
17:00 (UTC-3)		Report		Stadium: Estádio Maria Lamas Farache (Frasqueirão); Attendance: 5,713; Referee: Alexandre Vargas Tavares de Jesus

16 June 2025 9	Náutico	2–1	Maringá	Recife
19:30 (UTC-3)	Igor Pereira 9'; Patrick Allan 29'	Report	Edison Negueba 62' (pen.)	Stadium: Estádio Eládio de Barros Carvalho (Aflitos); Attendance: 3,787; Referee: Felipe da Silva Gonçalves Paludo

29 June 2025 10	Tombense	0–2	Náutico	Tombos
19:00 (UTC-3)		Report	Marco Antônio 26'; Arnaldo 64'	Stadium: Estádio Antônio Guimarães de Almeida (Almeidão); Attendance: 293; Referee: Fabiano Monteiro dos Santos

5 July 2025 11	Náutico	0–0	Floresta	Recife
17:00 (UTC-3)		Report		Stadium: Estádio Eládio de Barros Carvalho (Aflitos); Attendance: 8,285; Referee: Paulo Roberto Alves Júnior

13 July 2025 12	Figueirense	0–0	Náutico	Florianópolis
19:30 (UTC-3)		Report		Stadium: Estádio Orlando Scarpelli; Attendance: 8,838; Referee: Wallas Martins Lopes

21 July 2025 13	Náutico	2–0	Caxias	Recife
19:30 (UTC-3)	Paulo Sérgio 60'; Vinícius 83'	Report		Stadium: Estádio Eládio de Barros Carvalho (Aflitos); Attendance: 8,539; Referee: Angleison Marcos Vieira Monteiro

26 July 2025 14	Guarani	0–1	Náutico	Campinas
17:00 (UTC-3)		Report	Lucas Cardoso 45+2'	Stadium: Estádio Brinco de Ouro da Princesa; Attendance: 4,036; Referee: José Mendonça da Silva Júnior

3 August 2025 15	Náutico	3–0	Retrô	Recife
19:00 (UTC-3)	Patrick Allan 42'; Vinícius 48'; Hélio Borges 51'	Report		Stadium: Estádio Eládio de Barros Carvalho (Aflitos); Attendance: 13,914; Referee: Léo Simão Holanda

10 August 2025 16	Londrina	0–2	Náutico	Londrina
11:00 (UTC-3)		Report	Bruno Mezenga 64'; Marco Antônio 72'	Stadium: Estádio Jacy Scaff (do Café); Attendance: 4,008; Referee: Tarcísio Flores da Silva

17 August 2025 17	Náutico	1–0	Anápolis	Recife
19:00 (UTC-3)	Igor Bolt 77'	Report		Stadium: Estádio Eládio de Barros Carvalho (Aflitos); Attendance: 13,690; Referee: Daniel Alejandro Hidalgo Blanco

24 August 2025 18	São Bernardo	1–1	Náutico	São Bernardo do Campo
19:00 (UTC-3)	Foguinho 52'	Report	Marco Antônio 69'	Stadium: Estádio 1º de Maio; Attendance: 718; Referee: Arthur Gomes Rabelo

30 August 2025 19	Náutico	3–0	Ituano	Recife
17:00 (UTC-3)	Otusanya 25', 90+5'; Carlinhos 90+2'	Report		Stadium: Estádio Eládio de Barros Carvalho (Aflitos); Attendance: 8,758; Referee: Fernando Antônio Mendes de Salles Nascimento Filho

==== Second stage ====
7 September 2025 1	Brusque	0–1	Náutico	Brusque
19:00 (UTC-3)		Report	Patrick Allan 22'	Stadium: Estádio Augusto Bauer; Attendance: 2,481; Referee: Paulo Henrique Schleich Vollkopf

13 September 2025 2	Náutico	0–2	Guarani	Recife
17:00 (UTC-3)		Report	Bruno Santos 22'; Alan Santos 24'	Stadium: Estádio Eládio de Barros Carvalho (Aflitos); Attendance: 15,311; Referee: Jose Mendonca da Silva Junior

20 September 2025 3	Náutico	0–1	Ponte Preta	Recife
17:00 (UTC-3)		Report	Jonas Toró 19'	Stadium: Estádio Eládio de Barros Carvalho (Aflitos); Attendance: 13,887; Referee: Marcio dos Santos Oliveira

27 September 2025 4	Ponte Preta	1–1	Náutico	Campinas
17:00 (UTC-3)	Miguel 90+3'	Report	Bruno Mezenga 79' (pen.)	Stadium: Estádio Moisés Lucarelli; Attendance: 13,124; Referee: Alex Gomes Stefano

4 October 2025 5	Guarani	1–1	Náutico	Campinas
17:00 (UTC-3)	Dentinho 45+2'	Report	Paulo Sérgio 77'	Stadium: Estádio Brinco de Ouro da Princesa; Attendance: 10,792; Referee: Wilton Pereira Sampaio

11 October 2025 6	Náutico	2–1	Brusque	Recife
17:00 (UTC-3)	Hélio Borges 33'; Paulo Sérgio 87' (pen.)	Report	Mateus Silva 75' (o.g.)	Stadium: Estádio Eládio de Barros Carvalho (Aflitos); Attendance: 16,077; Referee: Paulo César Zanovelli da Silva

==== Record ====
Final Position	Points	Matches	Wins	Draws	Losses	Goals For	Goals Away	Avg%
3rd	44	25	12	8	5	30	13	58%
