= 2025 Retrô Futebol Clube Brasil season =

Retrô
2025 season
- Chairman: Laércio Guerra
- Manager: Dico Woolley; Evaristo Piza; Wíres José; Milton Mendes; Itamar Schülle
- Stadium: Arena Pernambuco
- Série C: 19th (relegated)
- Pernambucano: Runners-up
- Copa do Brasil: Round of 16
- Copa do Nordeste: Preliminary round
- Top goalscorer: League: Maycon Douglas and Radsley (2); All: Radsley (6)
Home colours	Away colours

The 2025 season was Retrô's 9th season in the club's history. Retrô competed in the Campeonato Pernambucano, Copa do Nordeste, Série C and Copa do Brasil.

== Statistics ==
=== Overall ===
Games played	40 (14 Pernambucano, 1 Copa do Nordeste, 6 Copa do Brasil, 19 Série C)
Games won	10 (6 Pernambucano, 0 Copa do Nordeste, 1 Copa do Brasil, 3 Série C)
Games drawn	14 (4 Pernambucano, 1 Copa do Nordeste, 4 Copa do Brasil, 5 Série C)
Games lost	16 (4 Pernambucano, 0 Copa do Nordeste, 1 Copa do Brasil, 11 Série C)
Goals scored	31
Goals conceded	46
Goal difference	–15
Best result (goal difference)	2–1 (A) v Jequié – Copa do Brasil – 2025.02.26; 2–1 (H) v Maguary – Pernambucano – 2025.03.09; 2–1 (H) v Figueirense – Série C – 2025.04.26
Worst result (goal difference)	0–4 (H) v Londrina – Série C – 2025.06.28
Top scorer	Radsley (6)

Source: Retrô official website

=== Goalscorers ===
Place	Position	Nationality	Number	Name	Copa do Nordeste	Campeonato Pernambucano	Copa do Brasil	Série C	Total
1	MF	(Brazil)	8	Radsley	0	4	0	2	6
2	FW	(Brazil)	9	Franklin Mascote	1	2	1	0	4
2	FW	(Brazil)	30	Maycon Douglas	0	1	1	2	4
3	MF	(Brazil)	10	Fernandinho	0	2	0	0	2
3	FW	(Brazil)	11	Júnior Fialho	0	2	0	0	2
3	MF	(Paraguay)	18	Richard Franco	0	1	1	0	2
4	DF	(Brazil)	3	Claudinho	0	0	1	0	1
4	DF	(Brazil)	2	Danilo	0	0	0	1	1
4	DF	(Brazil)	14	Denílson	0	1	0	0	1
4	MF	(Brazil)	17	Diego Guerra	0	0	1	0	1
4	MF	(Brazil)	7	Fabinho	0	0	1	0	1
4	MF	(Brazil)	14	Felipe Ferreira	0	0	0	1	1
4	DF	(Brazil)	6	Gustavo Salomão	0	1	0	0	1
4	MF	(Brazil)	27	Jonas	0	1	0	0	1
4	FW	(Brazil)	13	Mike	0	0	1	0	1
4	FW	(Brazil)	19	Vágner Love	0	0	0	1	1
4	DF	(Brazil)	15	Walce	0	1	0	0	1
				Total	1	16	7	7	31

=== Managers performance ===
Name	From	To	P	W	D	L	GF	GA	Avg%	Ref
(Brazil) Dico Woolley	4 January 2025	12 January 2025	2	0	1	1	2	4	16%	
(Brazil) Wilton Bezerra (c)	15 January 2025		1	1	0	0	1	0	100%	
(Brazil) Evaristo Piza	18 January 2025	26 February 2025	8	3	3	2	8	8	50%	
(Brazil) Wíres José	3 March 2025	13 April 2025	7	3	3	1	9	7	57%	
(Brazil) Milton Mendes	19 April 2025	11 May 2025	5	1	1	3	4	6	26%	
(Brazil) Wíres José	18 May 2025	14 June 2025	5	1	2	2	2	4	33%	
(Brazil) Itamar Schülle	28 June 2025	16 August 2025	10	1	3	6	4	15	20%	
(Brazil) Jamesson Andrade (c)	24 August 2025	30 August 2025	2	0	1	1	1	2	16%	

(c) Indicates the caretaker manager

== Official Competitions ==
=== Copa do Nordeste ===
==== Preliminary round ====
4 January 2025	Retrô	1–1 (5–6 p)	Moto Club	São Lourenço da Mata
19:30 (UTC-3)	Franklin Mascote 29'	Report	Danilo Pires 58'	Stadium: Estádio Governador Carlos Wilson Campos (Arena Pernambuco); Attendance: 1,070; Referee: José Magno Teixeira do Nascimento
	Penalties
	Franklin Mascote (penalty scored); Samuel Granada (penalty scored); Fernandinho (penalty missed); Richard Franco (penalty scored); Gedeilson (penalty missed); Luiz Henrique (penalty missed); Ericson (penalty scored); Rayan Ribeiro (penalty scored); Claudinho (penalty missed)		(penalty missed) Matheus Silva; (penalty scored) Wesley; (penalty scored) Danilo Pires; (penalty missed) Gustavo; (penalty scored) Lopeu; (penalty missed) Lucas Gomes; (penalty scored) Warllem Mateus; (penalty scored) Vitor Carvalho; (penalty scored) Allan Thiago

==== Record ====
Final Position	Points	Matches	Wins	Draws	Losses	Goals For	Goals Away	Avg%
N/A	1	1	0	1	0	1	1	33%

=== Campeonato Pernambucano ===
==== First stage ====
12 January 2025 1	Retrô	1–3	Maguary	São Lourenço da Mata
17:00 (UTC-3)	Denílson 90+6'	Report	Helber 12'; Erick 18'; Hericlis 86'	Stadium: Estádio Governador Carlos Wilson Campos (Arena Pernambuco); Attendance: 961; Referee: Paulo Belence Alves dos Prazeres Filho

15 January 2025 2	Retrô	1–0	Afogados da Ingazeira	Recife
18:00 (UTC-3)	Jonas 41'	Report		Stadium: Estádio José do Rego Maciel (Arruda); Attendance: 31; Referee: Rodrigo Jose Pereira de Lima

18 January 2025 3	Sport	1–1	Retrô	Recife
16:30 (UTC-3)	Marcelo Ajul 69'	Report	Walce 53'	Stadium: Estádio Adelmar da Costa Carvalho (Ilha do Retiro); Attendance: 9,524; Referee: José Marciano Lopes da Silva Júnior

25 January 2025 4	Retrô	1–1	Jaguar	São Lourenço da Mata
18:30 (UTC-3)	Radsley 48'	Report	Pedro Maycon 77'	Stadium: Estádio Governador Carlos Wilson Campos (Arena Pernambuco); Attendance: 379; Referee: Anderson Luis Marques

28 January 2025 5	Santa Cruz	1–0	Retrô	Recife
20:00 (UTC-3)	Israel 83'	Report		Stadium: Estádio José do Rego Maciel (Arruda); Attendance: 19,512; Referee: Nairon Pereira de Lira

2 February 2025 6	Retrô	1–0	Náutico	São Lourenço da Mata
17:00 (UTC-3)	Franklin Mascote 60'	Report		Stadium: Estádio Governador Carlos Wilson Campos (Arena Pernambuco); Attendance: 2,565; Referee: Rodrigo Pereira

9 February 2025 7	Petrolina	0–1	Retrô	Petrolina
18:00 (UTC-3)		Report	Júnior Fialho 83'	Stadium: Estádio Paulo de Souza Coelho; Attendance: 372; Referee: Diego Fernando Silva de Lima

16 February 2025 8	Retrô	1–1	Decisão	São Lourenço da Mata
18:00 (UTC-3)	Radsley 72' (pen.)	Report	Gilmar 68'	Stadium: Estádio Governador Carlos Wilson Campos (Arena Pernambuco); Attendance: 275; Referee: Luiz Fernando do Nascimento Silva

22 February 2025 9	Central	3–1	Retrô	Caruaru
16:30 (UTC-3)	Elivelton 41'; Thoni Brandão 48', 71'	Report	Franco 57'	Stadium: Estádio Luiz José de Lacerda (Lacerdão); Attendance: 70; Referee: Nairon Pereira de Lira

==== Second stage ====
3 March 2025	Náutico	0–0 (3–5 p)	Retrô	Recife
16:00 (UTC-3)		Report		Stadium: Estádio Eládio de Barros Carvalho (Aflitos); Attendance: 0 Referee: Wilton Pereira Sampaio
	Penalties
	Paulo Sérgio (penalty scored); Bruno Mezenga (penalty missed); Igor Fernandes (penalty scored); Hélio Borges (penalty scored)		(penalty scored) Júnior Fialho; (penalty scored) Ericson; (penalty scored) Radsley; (penalty scored) Lucas Grafite; (penalty scored) Richard Franco

==== Semi-finals ====
9 March 2025 First Leg	Retrô	2–1	Maguary	São Lourenço da Mata
17:00 (UTC-3)	Júnior Fialho 32'; Gustavo Salomão 90+4'	Report	Erick Cunha 34'	Stadium: Estádio Governador Carlos Wilson Campos (Arena Pernambuco); Attendance: 1,329; Referee: Paulo Belence Alves dos Prazeres Filho

16 March 2025 Second Leg	Maguary	1–2 (2–4 agg.)	Retrô	Recife
16:00 (UTC-3)	Bruce 85'	Report	Maycon Douglas 17'; Radsley 63'	Stadium: Estádio Adelmar da Costa Carvalho (Ilha do Retiro); Attendance: 1,309; Referee: Paulo Cesar Zanovelli da Silva

==== Finals ====
22 March 2025 First Leg	Retrô	2–3	Sport	São Lourenço da Mata
16:30 (UTC-3)	Fernandinho 48'; Radsley 51'	Report	Lenny Lobato 9'; Lucas Lima 38' (pen.); Pablo 86'	Stadium: Estádio Governador Carlos Wilson Campos (Arena Pernambuco); Attendance: 13,233; Referee: Bruno Arleu de Araújo

2 April 2025 Second Leg	Sport	1–2 (4–4 agg.) (4–2 p)	Retrô	Recife
21:30 (UTC-3)	Chico 25'	Report	Franklin Mascote 37'; Fernandinho 72'	Stadium: Estádio Adelmar da Costa Carvalho (Ilha do Retiro); Attendance: 24,884; Referee: Paulo Cesar Zavonelli
	Penalties
	Christian Rivera (penalty scored); Chico (penalty scored); João Silva (penalty scored); Carlos Alberto (penalty scored)		(penalty scored) Júnior Fialho; (penalty missed) Lucas Grafite; (penalty scored) Radsley; (penalty missed) Diego Guerra

==== Record ====
Final Position	Points	Matches	Wins	Draws	Losses	Goals For	Goals Away	Avg%
2nd	22	14	6	4	4	16	16	52%

=== Copa do Brasil ===
==== First round ====
26 February 2025	Jequié	1–2	Retrô	Jequié
19:30 (UTC-3)	João Grilo 22'	Report	Fabinho 25'; Claudinho 37'	Stadium: Estádio Waldomiro Borges; Attendance: 1,018; Referee: Wallas Martins Lopes

==== Second round ====
12 March 2025	Atlético Goianiense	1–1 (1–4 p)	Retrô	Goiânia
21:30 (UTC-3)	Caio Dantas 60'	Report	Maycon Douglas 40'	Stadium: Estádio Antônio Accioly; Attendance: 2,492; Referee: Wagner do Nascimento Magalhães
	Penalties
	William Pottker (penalty scored); Guilherme Romão (penalty missed); Ángelo Araos (penalty missed)		(penalty scored) Lucas Grafite; (penalty scored) Ericson; (penalty scored) Radsley; (penalty scored) Iba Ly

==== Third round ====
29 April 2025 First leg	Retrô	1–1	Fortaleza	São Lourenço da Mata
19:00 (UTC-3)	Franco 32'	Report	Lucero 88'	Stadium: Estádio Governador Carlos Wilson Campos (Arena Pernambuco); Attendance: 2,385; Referee: Gustavo Sampaio Octaviano de Souza

21 May 2025 Second leg	Fortaleza	1–1 (1–4 p)	Retrô	Fortaleza
19:00 (UTC-3)	Breno Lopes 57'	Report	Mike 65'	Stadium: Estádio Governador Plácido Castelo (Castelão); Attendance: 15,170; Referee: Flávio Rodrigues de Souza
	Penalties
	Juan Martín Lucero (penalty missed); Yago Pikachu (penalty scored); Kervin Andrade (penalty missed)		(penalty scored) Bruno Marques; (penalty scored) Júnior Fialho; (penalty scored) Radsley; (penalty scored) Richard Franco

==== Round of 16 ====
30 July 2025 First leg	Bahia	3–2	Retrô	Salvador
19:30 (UTC-3)	Rodríguez 18', 20'; Willian José 79'	Report	Diego Guerra 38'; Franklin Mascote 87'	Stadium: Casa de Apostas (Arena Fonte Nova); Attendance: 29,497; Referee: Flávio Rodrigues de Souza

6 August 2025 Second leg	Retrô	0–0	Bahia	São Lourenço da Mata
19:30 (UTC-3)		Report		Stadium: Estádio Governador Carlos Wilson Campos (Arena Pernambuco); Attendance: 2,913; Referee: Matheus Delgado Candançan

==== Record ====
Final Position	Points	Matches	Wins	Draws	Losses	Goals For	Goals Away	Avg%
14th	7	6	1	4	1	7	7	38%

=== Série C ===
==== First stage ====
13 April 2025 1	Retrô	0–0	Tombense	São Lourenço da Mata
16:00 (UTC-3)		Report		Stadium: Estádio Governador Carlos Wilson Campos (Arena Pernambuco); Attendance: 1,019; Referee: Márcio dos Santos Oliveira

19 April 2025 2	Ponte Preta	1–0	Retrô	Campinas
17:00 (UTC-3)	Jonas Toró 17'	Report		Stadium: Estádio Moisés Lucarelli; Attendance: 0 Referee: Murilo Ugolini Klain

26 April 2025 3	Retrô	2–1	Figueirense	São Lourenço da Mata
19:30 (UTC-3)	Maycon Douglas 50'; Radsley 88'	Report	Felipe Augusto 19'	Stadium: Estádio Governador Carlos Wilson Campos (Arena Pernambuco); Attendance: 744; Referee: Alexandre Vargas Tavares de Jesus

4 May 2025 4	Floresta	1–0	Retrô	Horizonte
16:30 (UTC-3)	Thomás Kayck 16'	Report		Stadium: Estádio Olímpico Horácio Domingos de Sousa (Domingão); Attendance: 133; Referee: Rafael Carlos Salgueiro Lima

11 May 2025 5	Caxias	2–1	Retrô	Caxias do Sul
16:30 (UTC-3)	Iago 55'; Willen Mota 77'	Report	Maycon Douglas 23'	Stadium: Estádio Francisco Stédile (Centenário); Attendance: 3,513; Referee: Kléber Ariel da Silva

18 May 2025 6	Retrô	1–0	Itabaiana	São Lourenço da Mata
19:00 (UTC-3)	Radsley 50'	Report		Stadium: Estádio Governador Carlos Wilson Campos (Arena Pernambuco); Attendance: 779; Referee: Léo Simão Holanda

25 May 2025 7	Botafogo–PB	1–0	Retrô	João Pessoa
15:00 (UTC-3)	Henrique Dourado 3'	Report		Stadium: Estádio José Américo de Almeida Filho (Almeidão); Attendance: 1,956; Referee: Anderson Ribeiro Gonçalves

31 May 2025 8	Retrô	0–2	Guarani	São Lourenço da Mata
17:00 (UTC-3)		Report	Emerson 29'; Rafael Bilú 34'	Stadium: Estádio Governador Carlos Wilson Campos (Arena Pernambuco); Attendance: 1,159; Referee: Paulo José Souza Mourão

14 June 2025 9	Anápolis	0–0	Retrô	Anápolis
19:30 (UTC-3)		Report		Stadium: Estádio Jonas Duarte; Attendance: 1,539; Referee: Julian Negreiros de Castro

28 June 2025 10	Retrô	0–4	Londrina	São Lourenço da Mata
17:00 (UTC-3)		Report	Vitinho 3'; Lucas Marques 39'; Pablo 59'; Iago Teles 82'	Stadium: Estádio Governador Carlos Wilson Campos (Arena Pernambuco); Attendance: 655; Referee: Tarcísio Flores da Silva

5 July 2025 11	Ituano	2–0	Retrô	Itu
17:00 (UTC-3)	Léo Passos 45+1'; Vinícius Popó 90+4'	Report		Stadium: Estádio Municipal Dr. Novelli Júnior; Attendance: 550; Referee: Angleison Marcos Vieira Monteiro

14 July 2025 12	Retrô	0–0	CSA	São Lourenço da Mata
19:30 (UTC-3)		Report		Stadium: Estádio Governador Carlos Wilson Campos (Arena Pernambuco); Attendance: 1,261; Referee: Halbert Luis Moraes Baia

20 July 2025 13	Brusque	1–2	Retrô	Brusque
19:00 (UTC-3)	Éverton Alemão 54'	Report	Vágner Love 32'; Felipe Ferreira 58'	Stadium: Estádio Augusto Bauer; Attendance: 1,105; Referee: Daniel Alejandro Hidalgo Blanco

26 July 2025 14	Retrô	0–0	Ypiranga	São Lourenço da Mata
19:30 (UTC-3)		Report		Stadium: Estádio Governador Carlos Wilson Campos (Arena Pernambuco); Attendance: 1,627; Referee: Arthur Gomes Rabelo

3 August 2025 15	Náutico	3–0	Retrô	Recife
19:00 (UTC-3)	Patrick Allan 42'; Vinícius 48'; Hélio Borges 51'	Report		Stadium: Estádio Eládio de Barros Carvalho (Aflitos); Attendance: 13,914; Referee: Léo Simão Holanda

10 August 2025 16	Retrô	0–1	São Bernardo	São Lourenço da Mata
19:00 (UTC-3)		Report	Echaporã 90+1'	Stadium: Estádio Governador Carlos Wilson Campos (Arena Pernambuco); Attendance: 316; Referee: Luciano da Silva Miranda Filho

16 August 2025 17	Maringá	1–0	Retrô	Maringá
17:00 (UTC-3)	Raí Natalino 90+3'	Report		Stadium: Estádio Regional Willie Davids; Attendance: 3,944; Referee: Bruno Mota Correia

24 August 2025 18	Retrô	1–1	ABC	São Lourenço da Mata
19:00 (UTC-3)	Danilo 48'	Report	Rafael Oller 90'	Stadium: Estádio Governador Carlos Wilson Campos (Arena Pernambuco); Attendance: 432; Referee: Paulo José Souza Mourão

30 August 2025 19	Confiança	1–0	Retrô	Aracaju
17:00 (UTC-3)	Maikon Aquino 45'	Report		Stadium: Estádio Lourival Baptista (Batistão); Attendance: 4,312; Referee: Antônio Dib Moraes de Sousa

==== Record ====
Final Position	Points	Matches	Wins	Draws	Losses	Goals For	Goals Away	Avg%
19th	14	19	3	5	11	7	22	24%
