= Marcos André (footballer, born 2003) =

Brazilian footballer (born 2003)

Personal information
- Full name: Marcos André de Menezes Diniz
- Date of birth: 1 March 2003 (age 23)
- Place of birth: Brazil
- Height: 1.85 m (6 ft 1 in)
- Position: Forward

Team information
- Current team: Chaves (on loan from Maguary)
- Number: 9

Youth career
- Cantareira
- Maranhão
- Retrô

Senior career*
Years	Team	Apps	(Gls)
2022–2025	Retrô	3	(0)
2022–2023	→ Red Bull Bragantino (loan)		
2023–2024	→ Dnipro-1 (loan)	2	(0)
2024	→ AC Oulu (loan)	11	(0)
2025	→ Maguary (loan)	8	(0)
2025–	Maguary	0	(0)
2025	→ Água Santa (loan)	5	(1)
2026	→ Santa Cruz (loan)	7	(2)
2025–	→ Chaves (loan)	4	(1)
- * Club domestic league appearances and goals as of 13 September 2026

Marcos André de Menezes Diniz, or Marquinhos, (born 1 March 2003) is a Brazilian professional footballer who plays as a forward for Liga Portugal 2 club Chaves on loan from Maguary.

== Club career ==
Since May 2022 until July 2023, André played for Red Bull Bragantino U20 team in Brazil.

André was loaned out to Ukrainian Premier League club SC Dnipro-1 for the 2023–24 season, but the loan was cut short prematurely in February 2024 due to Russian invasion of Ukraine.

On 11 March 2024, he was loaned out to AC Oulu in Finnish Veikkausliiga for the 2024 season.

On 2 December 2024, he signed a loan deal with Brazilian club Maguary.

== Career statistics ==
As of 2 June 2025

Appearances and goals by club, season and competition
Club	Season	Division	League		State league		National cup (Note: Includes Suomen Cup)		League cup		Continental		Total	
Club	Season	Division	Apps	Goals	Apps	Goals	Apps	Goals	Apps	Goals	Apps	Goals	Apps	Goals
Dnipro-1 (loan)	2023–24	Ukrainian Premier League	2	0	–		0	0	–		0	0	2	0
AC Oulu (loan)	2024	Veikkausliiga	11	0	–		2	3	0	0	–		13	3
Maguary (loan)	2025	Campeonato Pernambucano	–		8	0	0	0	0	0	–		8	0
Retrô	2025	Série C	3	0	0	0	0	0	0	0	–		3	0
Maguary	2025	Campeonato Pernambucano	–		0	0	–		–		–		0	0
Água Santa (loan)	2025	Série D	4	1	0	0	0	0	0	0	–		4	1
Career total			20	1	8	0	2	3	0	0	0	0	30	4
