= Carlinhos (footballer, born June 1995) =

Brazilian footballer

- Carlinhos in 2023

Personal information
- Full name: Carlos Adalberto de Oliveira Junior
- Date of birth: 16 June 1995 (age 31)
- Place of birth: Batatais, Brazil
- Height: 1.90 m (6 ft 3 in)
- Position: Centre-back

Team information
- Current team: Novorizontino (on loan from Noroeste)
- Number: 3

Youth career
- 2011: Batatais
- 2012–2013: Grêmio Prudente
- 2013–2014: Red Bull Brasil
- 2014–2015: Mirassol

Senior career*
Years	Team	Apps	(Gls)
2015	VOCEM	16	(1)
2016	Catanduvense	23	(2)
2017	Monte Azul	18	(2)
2017	XV de Jaú	6	(0)
2018	Portuguesa Santista	5	(0)
2018	Paulista	19	(0)
2019	Hwaseong	8	(0)
2020	Gimhae City	14	(4)
2021	São José-SP	12	(2)
2021–2022	Hwaseong	36	(2)
2023	Inter de Limeira	6	(0)
2023	Botafogo-SP	9	(0)
2024	Fujieda MYFC	8	(0)
2025–	Noroeste	18	(0)
2025	→ Náutico (loan)	20	(1)
2026–	→ Novorizontino (loan)	17	(0)
- * Club domestic league appearances and goals as of 17 November 2026

Carlos Adalberto de Oliveira Junior (born 16 June 1995), commonly known as Carlinhos, is a Brazilian footballer who plays for Novorizontino, on loan from Noroeste. Mainly a centre-back, he can also play as a defensive midfielder.

== Career ==
Born in Batatais, São Paulo, Carlinhos made his senior debut with VOCEM in 2015. He subsequently played for clubs in his native state in the following years, representing Catanduvense, Monte Azul, XV de Jaú, Portuguesa Santista and Paulista.

For the 2019 season, Carlinhos moved abroad and joined K3 League side Hwaseong. On 22 March 2021, after another spell at Gimhae City, he returned to his home country with São José-SP.

After being regularly used at Águia do Vale, Carlinhos returned to South Korea and Hwaseong, before signing for Inter de Limeira on 23 November 2022. The following 20 March, he joined Série B side Botafogo-SP.

On 28 December 2023, Carlinhos was announced at J2 League side Fujieda MYFC. Roughly one year later, he joined Noroeste for the Campeonato Paulista, and was regularly used before being loaned out to Náutico on 27 February 2025.

Back to Norusca for the 2026 Paulistão, Carlinhos was loaned to Novorizontino on 11 March of that year.

== Career statistics ==
As of 5 November 2026

Club	Season	League			State League		Cup		Continental		Other		Total	
Club	Season	Division	Apps	Goals	Apps	Goals	Apps	Goals	Apps	Goals	Apps	Goals	Apps	Goals
VOCEM	2015	Paulista 2ª Divisão	—		16	1	—		—		—		16	1
Catanduvense	2016	Paulista A3	—		23	2	—		—		11 (Note: Appearance(s) in Copa Paulista)	0	34	2
Monte Azul	2017	Paulista A3	—		18	2	—		—		—		18	2
XV de Jaú	2017	Paulista 2ª Divisão	—		6	0	—		—		—		6	0
Portuguesa Santista	2018	Paulista A3	—		5	0	—		—		—		5	0
Paulista	2018	Paulista 2ª Divisão	—		19	0	—		—		—		19	0
Hwaseong	2019	K3 League Advanced	8	0	—		6	0	—		—		14	0
Gimhae	2020	K3 League	14	4	—		2	1	—		1 (Note: Appearance(s) in the Championship play-offs)	0	17	5
São José-SP	2021	Paulista A3	—		12	2	—		—		—		12	2
Hwaseong	2021	K3 League	10	0	—		0	0	—		—		10	0
Hwaseong	2022	K3 League	26	2	—		3	0	—		—		29	2
Hwaseong	Total		36	2	—		3	0	—		—		39	2
Inter de Limeira	2023	Série D	—		6	0	—		—		—		6	0
Botafogo-SP	2023	Série B	9	0	—		2	0	—		—		11	0
Fujieda MYFC	2024	J2 League	8	0	—		2	0	—		—		10	0
Noroeste	2025	Paulista	—		10	0	—		—		—		10	0
Noroeste	2026	Série D	—		8	0	—		—		—		8	0
Noroeste	Total		—		18	0	—		—		—		18	0
Náutico (loan)	2025	Série C	20	1	—		3	0	—		3 (Note: Appearance(s) in Copa do Nordeste)	0	26	1
Novorizontino (loan)	2026	Série B	15	0	—		—		—		1 (Note: Appearance(s) in Copa Sul-Sudeste)	0	16	0
Career total			110	7	123	7	18	1	0	0	16	0	267	15
