= 2024 Fujieda MYFC season =

Fujieda MYFC
2024 season
- Manager: Daisuke Sudo
- Stadium: Fujieda Soccer Stadium
- J2 League: 13th
- Emperor's Cup: Second round
- J.League Cup: First round
- All statistics correct as of 25 May 2024.

The 2024 season was the club's 15th season in existence and the second consecutive in the Japanese second division, J2 League.

== Current squad ==
As of 9 February 2024.

Note: Flags indicate national team as defined under FIFA eligibility rules; some limited exceptions apply. Players may hold more than one non-FIFA nationality.

No.	Pos.	Nation	Player
1	GK	JPN	Kosuke Okanishi
2	DF	JPN	Nobuyuki Kawashima (vice-captain)
3	DF	JPN	Shota Suzuki
4	DF	JPN	So Nakagawa
5	DF	JPN	Keisuke Ogasawara
6	MF	JPN	Taiki Arai
7	MF	JPN	Taisuke Mizuno
8	MF	JPN	Ren Asakura
9	FW	JPN	Ken Yamura
10	MF	JPN	Keigo Enomoto
11	FW	BRA	Anderson Chaves
13	MF	JPN	Kota Osone
14	MF	JPN	Kazaki Nakagawa
15	MF	JPN	Masahiko Sugita (captain)
16	DF	JPN	Kotaro Yamahara
17	FW	JPN	Kenshiro Hirao

No.	Pos.	Nation	Player
18	MF	JPN	Yosei Ozeki
19	MF	PER	Kazuyoshi Shimabuku (on loan from Albirex Niigata)
21	GK	JPN	Hiromichi Sugawara
22	DF	JPN	Ryosuke Hisadomi
23	MF	JPN	Ryota Kajikawa
24	MF	JPN	Kanta Nagata
26	MF	JPN	Kento Nishiya
27	MF	JPN	Shoma Maeda
29	DF	BRA	Carlinhos
30	MF	JPN	Kaito Seriu
33	MF	JPN	Shohei Kawakami
35	GK	JPN	Kei Uchiyama (on loan from Sagan Tosu)
41	GK	JPN	Kai Chidi Kitamura
81	FW	JPN	Taika Nakashima (on loan from Consadole Sapporo)
99	DF	BRA	Wendel Matheus

=== Out on loan ===
Note: Flags indicate national team as defined under FIFA eligibility rules; some limited exceptions apply. Players may hold more than one non-FIFA nationality.

No.	Pos.	Nation	Player
—	MF	BRA	Pedro (on loan at Tochigi City)

== Transfers ==
=== In ===
Pos.	Player	From	Fee	Date	Ref.
DF	(Japan) So Nakagawa	(Japan) Júbilo Iwata	Undisclosed	8 December 2023	
MF	(Japan) Kazuyoshi Shimabuku	(Japan) Fujieda MYFC	Loan	25 December 2023	

=== Out ===
Pos.	Player	To	Fee	Date	Ref.
MF	(Brazil) Pedro Henrique Campos da Costa	(Japan) Tochigi City FC	Loan	1 February 2024	
FW	(Brazil) Naldinho	(China) Suzhou Dongwu	Free	28 February 2024	

== Friendly matches ==
25 February 2024 Friendly	Júbilo Iwata	3–2	Fujieda MYFC

== Competitions ==
=== Overall record ===
Competition	First match	Last match	Starting round	Final position	Record							
Competition	First match	Last match	Starting round	Final position	Pld	W	D	L	GF	GA	GD	Win %
J2 League	24 February 2024		Matchday 1		17	6	3	8	13	23	−10	35.29
Emperor's Cup	12 June 2024		Second round		0	0	0	0	0	0	+0	—
J.League Cup	6 March 2024		First round	First round	1	0	0	1	1	2	−1	0.00
Total					18	6	3	9	14	25	−11	33.33

Last updated: 25 May 2024
Source: Competitions

=== J2 League ===
==== Table ====
Pos	Team	Pld	W	D	L	GF	GA	GD	Pts
11	Renofa Yamaguchi	38	15	8	15	43	44	−1	53
12	Roasso Kumamoto	38	13	7	18	53	62	−9	46
13	Fujieda MYFC	38	14	4	20	38	57	−19	46
14	Ventforet Kofu	38	12	9	17	54	57	−3	45
15	Mito HollyHock	38	11	11	16	39	51	−12	44

Source: Meiji Yasuda J2 League, J.League Data Site
Rules for classification: 1) Points; 2) Goal difference; 3) Goals scored; 4) Head-to-head points; 5) Head-to-head goal difference; 6) Head-to-head goal scored; 7) Fair-play points.

==== Results summary ====
Overall								Home						Away					
Pld	W	D	L	GF	GA	GD	Pts	W	D	L	GF	GA	GD	W	D	L	GF	GA	GD
2	0	1	1	0	4	−4	1	0	1	0	0	0	0	0	0	1	0	4	−4

Last updated: 2 March 2024.
Source: Worldfootball

==== Results by round ====
Round	1	2	3
Ground	H	A	A
Result	D	L	
Position	13	17	

Updated to match(es) played on 2 March 2024. Source: Worldfootball
A = Away; H = Home; W = Win; D = Draw; L = Loss

==== Matches ====
The schedule were released on 19 December 2023.

=== J.League Cup ===
6 March First round	FC Ryukyu	2–1	Fujieda MYFC	Okinawa
19:00 UTC+9	Sato 52', 80'		Nakashima 49'	Stadium: Tapic Kenso Hiyagon Stadium; Referee: Koei Koya
