= Gustavo Salomão =

Brazilian footballer

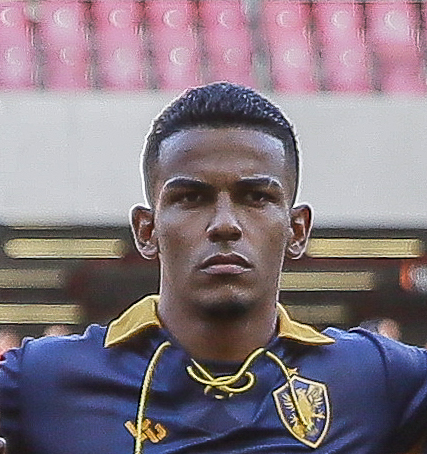
- Salomão in 2025

Personal information
- Full name: Gustavo Salomão Miguel
- Date of birth: 28 June 1997 (age 29)
- Place of birth: Muzambinho, Brazil
- Height: 1.84 m (6 ft 0 in)
- Position: Left-back

Team information
- Current team: Portuguesa
- Number: 6

Youth career
- São Paulo
- Guarani

Senior career*
Years	Team	Apps	(Gls)
2017–2018	Guarani	27	(0)
2018	→ Atlético Paranaense (loan)	0	(0)
2019	Ituano	4	(0)
2020–2021	Oeste	53	(2)
2022	Vitória	4	(0)
2022	Botafogo-PB	10	(0)
2023	Barra-SC	15	(0)
2023	Londrina	21	(0)
2024	AF Elbasani	14	(0)
2025	Retrô	22	(1)
2026–	Portuguesa	16	(0)
- * Club domestic league appearances and goals as of 20:44, 22 July 2026 (UTC)

Gustavo Salomão Miguel (born 28 June 1997) is a Brazilian footballer who plays as a left-back for Portuguesa.

== Career ==
Born in Muzambinho, Minas Gerais, Salomão was a Guarani youth graduate, and made his first team debut on 23 May 2017, starting in a 2–0 Série B home win over Figueirense. On 11 June, he renewed his contract until the end of 2018, and was regularly used in the remainder of the season.

On 16 May 2018, after being rarely used, Salomão was loaned to Atlético Paranaense to become a member of their under-23 team. On 3 December, he joined Ituano, but rescinded his link on 11 September 2019, after just four matches.

Ahead of the 2020 season, Salomão signed for Oeste, being regularly used during his two-year spell. On 14 December 2021, he joined Vitória, but left the club the following 13 May, and moved to Botafogo-PB on 2 June.

Salomão started the 2023 campaign at Barra-SC, before signing for Londrina on 31 March of that year. Separated from the squad in July, he returned to the first team late in the month, but still left the club in November.

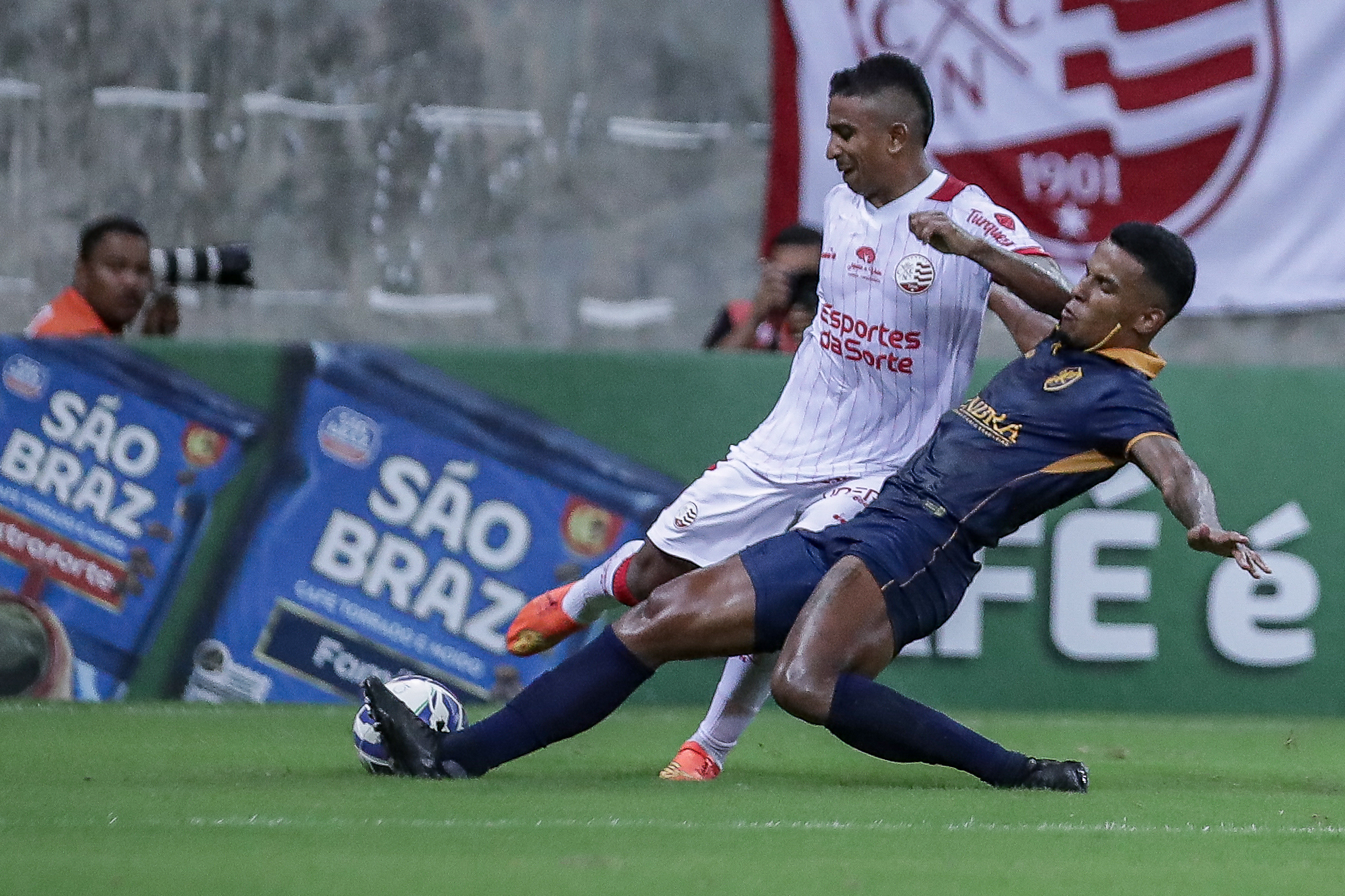
Salomão (in blue) playing for Retrô in 2025

On 22 January 2024, Salomão moved abroad for the first time in his career, joining Kategoria e Parë side AF Elbasani. He helped the club to achieve promotion as champions before departing, and signed for Retrô in November 2024.

On 19 November 2025, Portuguesa announced the signing of Salomão for the upcoming season. The following 18 May, after establishing himself as a starter after the departure of Caio Roque, he renewed his contract until March 2027.

== Career statistics ==
As of 22 July 2026

Club	Season	League			State League		Cup		Continental		Other		Total	
Club	Season	Division	Apps	Goals	Apps	Goals	Apps	Goals	Apps	Goals	Apps	Goals	Apps	Goals
Guarani	2017	Série B	24	0	—		—		—		—		24	0
Guarani	2018	Série B	—		3	0	—		—		—		3	0
Guarani	Total		24	0	3	0	—		—		—		27	0
Ituano	2019	Série D	2	0	2	0	—		—		—		4	0
Oeste	2020	Série B	23	1	3	0	1	0	—		—		27	1
Oeste	2021	Série C	12	0	15	1	—		—		—		27	1
Oeste	Total		35	1	18	1	1	0	—		—		54	2
Vitória	2022	Série C	—		4	0	—		—		—		4	0
Botafogo-PB	2022	Série C	10	0	—		—		—		—		10	0
Barra-SC	2023	Catarinense	—		15	0	—		—		—		15	0
Londrina	2023	Série B	21	0	—		—		—		—		21	0
AF Elbasani	2023–24	Kategoria e Parë	14	0	—		—		—		—		14	0
Retrô	2025	Série C	12	0	10	1	5	0	—		1 (Note: Appearance(s) in Copa do Nordeste)	0	28	1
Portuguesa	2026	Série D	13	0	3	0	3	0	—		—		19	0
Career total			131	1	55	2	9	0	0	0	1	0	196	3

== Honours ==
AF Elbasani

- Kategoria e Parë: 2023–24
