= Buiú (footballer, born 1996) =

Brazilian footballer

Personal information
- Full name: Marcos Ytalo Benicio da Silva
- Date of birth: 27 April 1996 (age 30)
- Place of birth: Fortaleza, Brazil
- Height: 1.71 m (5 ft 7 in)
- Position: Right back

Team information
- Current team: América de Natal
- Number: 23

Youth career
- Ceará

Senior career*
Years	Team	Apps	(Gls)
2014–2016	Ceará	11	(1)
2014	→ Itapipoca (loan)	2	(0)
2017	Joinville	14	(1)
2018–2019	Ferroviária	15	(0)
2018	→ Bragantino (loan)	11	(0)
2019	→ Bragantino (loan)	8	(0)
2020	Santo André	4	(0)
2020–2023	Ceará	18	(1)
2023	Sampaio Corrêa	4	(0)
2023–	América de Natal	3	(0)
- * Club domestic league appearances and goals as of 3 July 2023

Marcos Ytalo Benício da Silva (born 27 April 1996), commonly known as Buiú, is a Brazilian footballer who plays as a right back for América de Natal.

== Club career ==
Buiú was born in Fortaleza, Ceará, and finished his formation with hometown side Ceará SC. In 2014, he was loaned to Itapipoca for the year's Campeonato Cearense, but only featured in two matches for the club.

Upon returning, Buiú made his first team debut for Ceará in the 2014 Copa Fares Lopes, but never established himself as a regular starter. He scored his first senior goal on 27 February 2016, netting his team's third in a 3–1 Campeonato Cearense home win against Guarany de Sobral; in that match, he was also sent off due to the goal celebration.

On 7 March 2017, Buiú joined Joinville initially on a three-month contract. He moved to Ferroviária roughly one year later, but finished the year on loan at Bragantino, helping the latter side in their promotion to Série B.

On 8 February 2019, Buiú returned to Braga also on loan, but finished the year back at AFE in the Copa Paulista. For the 2020 season, he moved to Santo André before returning to Ceará, initially for their under-23 squad.

Buiú was definitely promoted to Ceará main squad in 2021, as a backup to new signing Gabriel Dias. He made his Série A debut on 30 May 2021, starting in a 3–2 home success over Grêmio.

== Career statistics ==
As of 25 October 2021

Club	Season	League			State League		Cup		Continental		Other		Total	
Club	Season	Division	Apps	Goals	Apps	Goals	Apps	Goals	Apps	Goals	Apps	Goals	Apps	Goals
Ceará	2014	Série B	0	0	—		0	0	—		5 (Note: Appearance(s) in Copa Fares Lopes)	0	5	0
Ceará	2015	Série B	7	0	0	0	2	0	—		—		9	0
Ceará	2016	Série B	3	0	1	1	2	0	—		6 (Note: Two appearances in Copa do Nordeste, four appearances in Copa Fares Lopes)	0	12	1
Ceará	Total		10	0	1	1	4	0	—		11	0	26	1
Itapipoca (loan)	2014	Cearense	—		2	0	—		—		—		2	0
Joinville	2017	Série C	13	1	1	0	0	0	—		—		14	1
Ferroviária	2018	Série D	4	0	—		—		—		4 (Note: Appearance(s) in Copa Paulista)	0	8	0
Ferroviária	2019	Série D	4	0	—		—		—		15	1	19	1
Ferroviária	Total		8	0	—		—		—		19	1	27	1
Bragantino (loan)	2018	Série C	11	0	—		—		—		—		11	0
Bragantino (loan)	2019	Série B	0	0	8	0	—		—		—		8	0
Bragantino (loan)	Total		11	0	8	0	—		—		—		19	0
Santo André	2020	Paulista	—		4	0	1	0	—		—		5	0
Ceará	2020	Série A	0	0	—		—		—		—		0	0
Ceará	2021	Série A	12	0	3	1	1	0	1 (Note: Appearance(s) in Copa Sudamericana)	0	2 (Note: Appearance(s) in Copa do Nordeste)	0	19	1
Ceará	Total		12	0	3	1	1	0	1	0	2	0	19	1
Career total			54	1	19	2	6	0	1	0	32	1	112	4
