= Júlio César (footballer, born 1994) =

Brazilian footballer

Personal information
- Full name: Júlio César Czarneski
- Date of birth: 12 August 1994 (age 32)
- Place of birth: Araucária, Brazil
- Height: 1.72 m (5 ft 7 1/2 in)
- Position: Winger

Team information
- Current team: Avaí

Youth career
- Paraná

Senior career*
Years	Team	Apps	(Gls)
2013–2014	Paraná	29	(1)
2015	ABC	9	(1)
2015	Inter de Lages	1	(0)
2016	FC Cascavel	5	(0)
2016	Inter de Lages	9	(0)
2017	Caxias	15	(3)
2017	Oeste	12	(2)
2017–2020	Chapecoense	13	(0)
2018	→ Atlético Goianiense (loan)	44	(8)
2019	→ Ponte Preta (loan)	9	(1)
2019	→ Botafogo-SP (loan)	18	(1)
2020	→ Atlético Goianiense (loan)	12	(2)
2020–2021	Portimonense	8	(0)
2021	→ Guarani (loan)	43	(5)
2022	Guarani	36	(0)
2023	Criciúma	5	(0)
2023–	Avaí	0	(0)
- * Club domestic league appearances and goals as of 03:05, 30 March 2020 (UTC)

Júlio César Czarneski (born 12 August 1994), known as Júlio César, is a Brazilian footballer who plays as a winger for Avaí.

== Career statistics ==
As of 29 March 2020.

Club	Season	League			State League		Cup		Continental		Other		Total	
Club	Season	Division	Apps	Goals	Apps	Goals	Apps	Goals	Apps	Goals	Apps	Goals	Apps	Goals
Paraná Clube	2013	Série B	1	1	8	0	2	0	—		—		11	1
Paraná Clube	2014	Série B	12	0	8	0	1	0	—		—		21	0
Paraná Clube	Total		13	1	16	0	3	0	—		—		32	1
ABC	2015	Série B	0	0	9	1	2	0	—		—		11	1
Inter de Lages	2015	Série D	1	0	—		—		—		—		1	0
FC Cascavel	2016	Paranaense	—		5	0	—		—		—		5	0
Inter de Lages	2016	Série D	9	0	—		—		—		—		9	0
Caxias	2017	Gaúcho	—		15	3	—		—		—		15	3
Oeste	2017	Série B	12	2	—		0	0	—		—		12	2
Chapecoense	2017	Série A	7	0	0	0	0	0	1 (Note: Appearance(s) in Copa Sudamericana)	0	—		8	0
Chapecoense	2018	Série A	0	0	1	0	0	0	0	0	—		1	0
Chapecoense	2019	Série A	0	0	3	0	0	0	1	0	—		4	0
Chapecoense	Total		7	0	4	0	0	0	2	0	—		13	0
Atlético Goianiense (loan)	2018	Série B	36	8	8	0	1	0	—		—		28	3
Ponte Preta (loan)	2019	Série B	2	0	7	1	0	0	—		—		9	1
Botafogo-SP (loan)	2019	Série B	18	1	—		—		—		—		18	1
Atlético Goianiense (loan)	2020	Série A	0	0	9	2	2	0	—		—		11	2
Career total			98	12	73	7	8	0	2	0	0	0	181	19
