= Islan =

Brazilian footballer

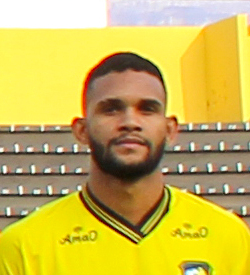
- Islan in 2022

Personal information
- Full name: Islan Rafael Ramos Fernandes
- Date of birth: 22 October 1996 (age 30)
- Place of birth: Maragogi, Brazil
- Height: 1.95 m (6 ft 5 in)
- Position: Centre-back

Team information
- Current team: Floresta
- Number: 23

Senior career*
Years	Team	Apps	(Gls)
2016	São Domingos-AL		
2018–2019	Coruripe	9	(2)
2018	→ Estanciano (loan)		
2019	→ Estanciano (loan)		
2020	Linense	16	(2)
2020	CEOV	5	(1)
2021	Capital-DF	8	(0)
2021	Potiguar Mossoró	6	(0)
2021–2022	Novo Hamburgo	10	(0)
2022	São Bernardo	14	(0)
2023	Ypiranga-RS	17	(1)
2024	Novo Hamburgo	12	(1)
2024	Náutico	9	(1)
2025	CSA	14	(0)
2026	Velo Clube	4	(0)
2026–	Floresta	21	(1)
- * Club domestic league appearances and goals as of 9 November 2026

Islan Rafael Ramos Fernandes (born 22 October 1996), simply known as Islan, is a Brazilian footballer who plays as a centre-back for Floresta.

== Career ==
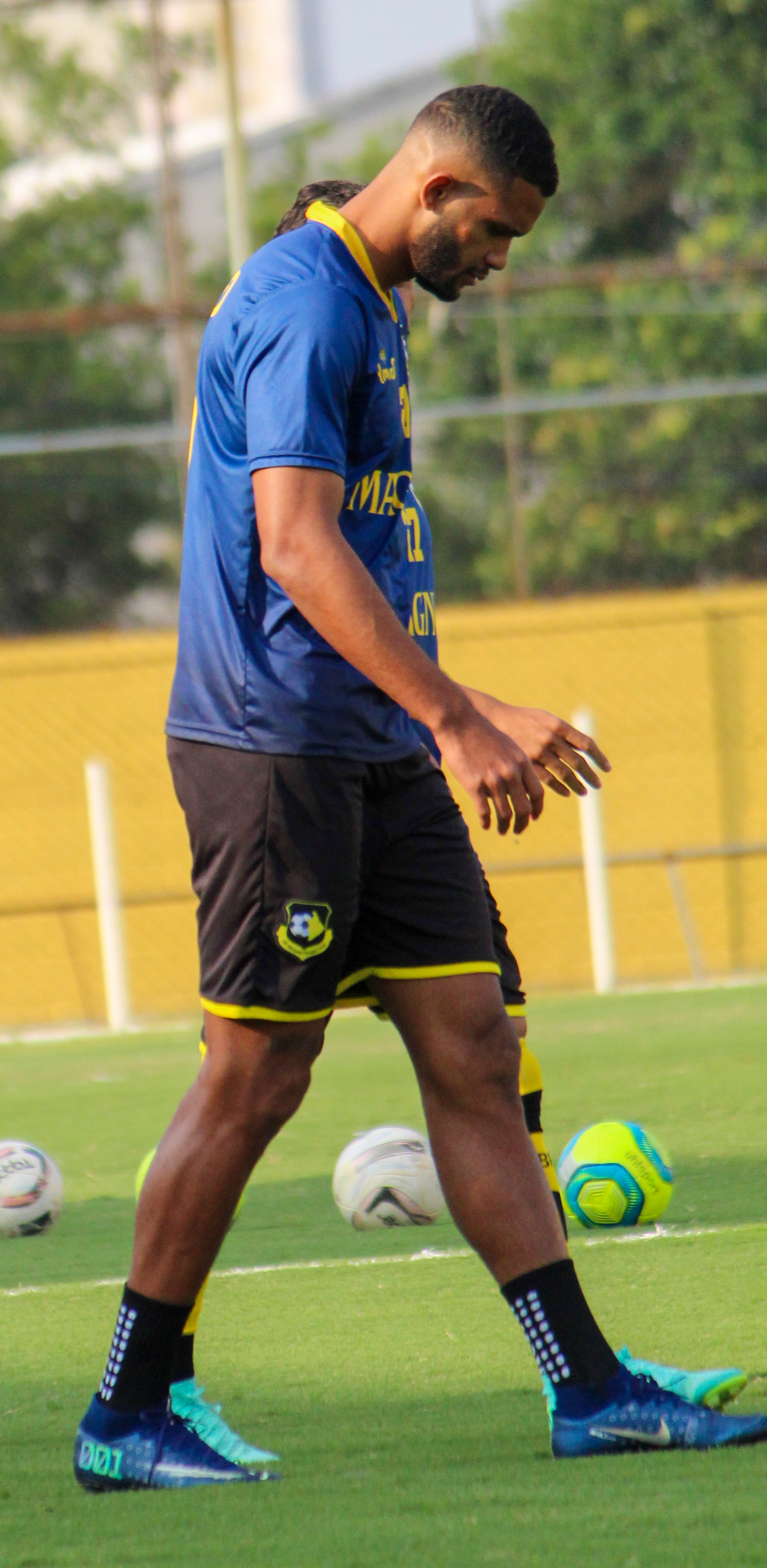
Islan training with São Bernardo in 2022

Born in Maragogi, Alagoas, Islan began his career with São Domingos-AL, and later played for Coruripe and Estanciano before signing for Linense on 20 January 2020.

On 4 November 2020, Islan moved to CEOV, and subsequently signed for Capital-DF. On 14 April 2022, after a period at Novo Hamburgo, he agreed to a deal with São Bernardo.

On 28 November 2022, Islan was announced at Ypiranga-RS. He returned to Noia exactly one year later, but moved to Náutico on 1 July 2024.

On 10 September 2024, Islan agreed to join CSA for the upcoming season. After suffering relegation from the 2025 Série C, he moved to Velo Clube on 24 November of that year.

Initially a backup option at Velo, Islan played in the last four matches of the club in the 2026 Campeonato Paulista, also suffering relegation; he gained notoriety after a hard tackle in Santos' Neymar during the last match, a 6–0 which sealed the club's relegation.

== Career statistics ==
As of 19 February 2026

Club	Season	League			State League		Cup		Continental		Other		Total	
Club	Season	Division	Apps	Goals	Apps	Goals	Apps	Goals	Apps	Goals	Apps	Goals	Apps	Goals
Coruripe	2018	Alagoano	—		0	0	—		—		—		0	0
Coruripe	2019	Série D	3	1	6	1	—		—		—		9	2
Coruripe	Total		3	1	6	1	—		—		—		9	2
Linense	2020	Paulista A3	—		16	2	—		—		—		16	2
CEOV	2020	Série D	3	1	2	0	—		—		—		5	1
Capital-DF	2021	Brasiliense	—		8	0	—		—		—		8	0
Potiguar de Mossoró	2021	Potiguar	—		6	0	—		—		—		6	0
Novo Hamburgo	2021	Gaúcho	—		—		—		—		15 (Note: Appearance(s) in Copa FGF)	0	15	0
Novo Hamburgo	2022	Gaúcho	—		10	0	—		—		—		10	0
Novo Hamburgo	Total		—		10	0	—		—		15	0	25	0
São Bernardo	2022	Série D	14	0	—		—		—		—		14	0
Ypiranga-RS	2023	Série C	8	0	9	1	4	0	—		—		21	1
Novo Hamburgo	2024	Série D	6	0	6	1	—		—		—		12	1
Náutico	2024	Série C	9	1	—		—		—		—		9	1
CSA	2025	Série C	12	0	2	0	4	0	—		6 (Note: Five appearances in Copa do Nordeste, one appearance in Copa Alagoas)	0	24	0
Velo Clube	2026	Série D	0	0	4	0	—		—		—		4	0
Career total			55	3	69	5	8	0	0	0	21	0	153	8
