= Pedro Maycon =

Brazilian footballer

Personal information
- Full name: Pedro Maycon dos Anjos Francisco
- Date of birth: 15 August 1994 (age 32)
- Place of birth: Chã Grande, Brazil
- Height: 1.79 m (5 ft 10 in)
- Position: Forward

Senior career*
Years	Team	Apps	(Gls)
2014–2015	Serra Talhada	22	(2)
2015–2016	Afogados	4	(3)
2017	Cabense	2	(0)
2018	CSE	5	(0)
2019	Flamengo de Arcoverde	7	(4)
2019	Central	6	(0)
2019	Decisão	10	(1)
2020	Lagarto	2	(1)
2020	Decisão	1	(0)
2020	Campinense	2	(0)
2021	Vera Cruz	9	(4)
2021	Central	12	(4)
2022	Salgueiro	7	(3)
2022	Afogados	1	(0)
2022	Ferroviário do Cabo	8	(0)
2023	Sousa	1	(0)
2023	Vera Cruz	10	(4)
2024	Força e Luz	0	(0)
2024–2025	América-PE	6	(3)
2024–2025	→ Jaguar (loan)	22	(17)
2025	Sergipe	9	(2)
2025	América-PE	5	(3)
- * Club domestic league appearances and goals as of 3 November 2025

Pedro Maycon dos Anjos Francisco (born 15 August 1994), simply known as Pedro Maycon, is a Brazilian professional footballer who plays as a forward.

== Career ==
Having played most of his career in football in the northeast region of Brazil, Pedro Maycon stood out especially in 2019 for Flamengo de Arcoverde, when he competed for the top scorer in the Pernambuco championship, and in 2025, when he achieved this feat playing for Jaguar, where he caught the attention of other big clubs in the region such as Santa Cruz. On 30 March, 2025, he signed a contract with CS Sergipe. In September, after ending his contract with Sergipe, he returned to América to compete in the second division, finishing as runner-up and gaining promotion.

== Honours ==
Decisão

- Campeonato Pernambucano Second Division: 2019

Jaguar

- Campeonato Pernambucano Second Division: 2024

Individual

- 2025 Campeonato Pernambucano top scorer: 6 goals
