= Sousa (Brazilian footballer) =

Brazilian association football player

- Van Basty with Persija in 2026

Personal information
- Full name: Van Basty Sousa e Silva
- Date of birth: 27 November 1994 (age 31)
- Place of birth: Olivedos, Paraíba, Brazil
- Height: 1.83 m (6 ft 0 in)
- Position: Defensive midfielder

Team information
- Current team: Borneo Samarinda (on loan from Persija Jakarta)
- Number: 15

Youth career
- 2011–2013: Campinense
- 2013–2014: Brasília

Senior career*
Years	Team	Apps	(Gls)
2015	Campinense	0	(0)
2015–2016	Comercial-MS	8	(1)
2016	→ Democrata (loan)	0	(0)
2016	Campinense	0	(0)
2017	Almirante Barroso	15	(1)
2017	→ Barra-SC (loan)	7	(0)
2018–2020	Brasil de Pelotas	73	(2)
2021	Mirassol	19	(0)
2021	Brasil de Pelotas	4	(0)
2022	Chapecoense	13	(0)
2022–2024	Vila Nova	58	(2)
2024	Santo André	6	(0)
2024–2025	Náutico	34	(2)
2024	→ Amazonas (loan)	4	(0)
2025	→ Londrina (loan)	5	(0)
2025–	Persija Jakarta	29	(1)
2026–	→ Borneo Samarinda (loan)	3	(0)
- * Club domestic league appearances and goals as of 20 October 2026

Van Basty Sousa e Silva (born 27 November 1994), simply known as Sousa, is a Brazilian professional footballer who plays as a defensive midfielder for Indonesian Super League club Borneo Samarinda, on loan from Persija Jakarta.

== Career ==
Born in Olivedos, Paraíba, Sousa began playing senior football with Campinense Clube at age 18. He would win the Copa do Nordeste with the club. Next, Van Basty was loaned to Brasília Futebol Clube where he competed in the Copa São Paulo de Futebol Júnior and won the Copa Verde.

He has previously represented Comercial-MS in 2015 Campeonato Brasileiro Série D.
