= Rhuan (footballer, born January 2000) =

Brazilian footballer

Personal information
- Full name: Rhuan da Silveira Castro
- Date of birth: 25 January 2000 (age 26)
- Place of birth: São Gonçalo, Brazil
- Height: 1.70 m (5 ft 7 in)
- Position: Attacking midfielder

Team information
- Current team: Sukhothai
- Number: 28

Youth career
- 2015–2019: Botafogo

Senior career*
Years	Team	Apps	(Gls)
2019–2021	Botafogo	33	(1)
2021–2022	Radomiak Radom	5	(0)
2022	SKA Brasil	2	(0)
2022	Amora	5	(0)
2022	Amora B	5	(0)
2023	Fontinhas	14	(1)
2024–2025	Azuriz	10	(2)
2024	→ Aparecidense (loan)	7	(1)
2024–2025	→ Inter de Limeira (loan)	6	(2)
2025	Itabaiana	10	(0)
2026	Portuguesa (RJ)	8	(0)
2026–	Sukhothai	0	(0)
- * Club domestic league appearances and goals as of 22:04, 19 November 2024 (UTC)

Rhuan da Silveira Castro (born 25 January 2000), simply known as Rhuan, is a Brazilian professional footballer who plays for Sukhothai. Mainly an attacking midfielder, he can also play as a forward for Thai League 1 club Sukhothai.

== Club career ==
Born in São Gonçalo, Rio de Janeiro, Rhuan represented Botafogo as a youth setup. In late July 2019, he was promoted to the first team by manager Eduardo Barroca.

Rhuan made his first team – and Série A – debut on 17 August 2019, coming on as a substitute for fellow youth graduate Bochecha in a 2–0 away loss against Corinthians.
