= Claudinho (footballer, born 1990) =

Brazilian footballer

Personal information
- Full name: Cláudio de Souza
- Date of birth: 19 May 1990 (age 36)
- Place of birth: Santa Cruz do Sul, Brazil
- Height: 1.83 m (6 ft 0 in)
- Position: Centre-back

Team information
- Current team: Ituano

Youth career
- Santa Cruz-RS

Senior career*
Years	Team	Apps	(Gls)
2010	Avenida	4	(1)
2010–2015	Cruzeiro-RS	65	(5)
2012	→ Metropolitano (loan)	2	(0)
2013	→ Juventude (loan)	10	(0)
2014	→ Juventude (loan)	10	(0)
2015	Ypiranga-RS	14	(0)
2016–2017	São José-RS	33	(2)
2016	→ Ypiranga-RS (loan)	1	(0)
2018	Ypiranga-RS	21	(3)
2018	→ Avenida (loan)	15	(1)
2019	Avenida	18	(0)
2020–2021	Brusque	43	(0)
2022	Manaus	30	(3)
2022	Naft Al-Wasat		
2022	→ Al-Diwaniya (loan)		
2023–	Ituano	36	(1)
- * Club domestic league appearances and goals as of 23:04, 9 January 2024 (UTC)

Cláudio de Souza (born 19 May 1990), commonly known as Claudinho, is a Brazilian footballer who plays as a centre-back for Ituano.

== Career ==
Born in Santa Cruz do Sul, Rio Grande do Sul, Claudinho represented hometown side Santa Cruz-RS as a youth before making his senior debut with Avenida in the 2010 Campeonato Gaúcho. He moved to Cruzeiro-RS later in that year, and subsequently had loan spells at Metropolitano and two stints at Juventude.

In 2015, Claudinho moved to Ypiranga-RS, but started the 2016 season at São José-RS. On 29 April of that year, however, he returned to Ypiranga on loan.

On 8 December 2017, after being a starter back at São José, Claudinho signed a permanent contract with Ypiranga, being immediately loaned back to his first club Avenida for the 2018 Gauchão. He rejoined Avenida permanently for the 2019 season, being a regular starter during his spell.

On 12 December 2019, Claudinho agreed to a deal with Brusque, and renewed his contract with the club on 27 April 2021. On 17 December, he was announced at Manaus.

In August 2022, Claudinho moved abroad for the first time in his career, joining Naft Al-Wasat in the Iraq Stars League, but moved on loan to Al-Diwaniya on 6 September. On 24 January 2023, he returned to his home country and signed for Ituano in the second division.

== Career statistics ==
As of 11 January 2024

Club	Season	League			State League		Cup		Continental		Other		Total	
Club	Season	Division	Apps	Goals	Apps	Goals	Apps	Goals	Apps	Goals	Apps	Goals	Apps	Goals
Avenida	2010	Gaúcho	—		4	1	—		—		—		4	1
Cruzeiro-RS	2010	Gaúcho Série A2	—		—		—		—		11 (Note: Appearance(s) in Copa FGF)	0	11	0
Cruzeiro-RS	2011	Série D	6	0	13	3	—		—		17	2	36	5
Cruzeiro-RS	2012	Gaúcho	—		14	1	—		—		6	1	20	2
Cruzeiro-RS	2013	Gaúcho	—		13	0	—		—		—		13	0
Cruzeiro-RS	Total		6	0	40	4	—		—		34	3	80	7
Metropolitano (loan)	2012	Série D	2	0	—		—		—		—		2	0
Juventude (loan)	2013	Série D	8	1	—		—		—		3 (Note: One appearance in Copa Serrana, two appearances in Copa FGF)	0	11	1
Juventude (loan)	2014	Série C	10	0	—		—		—		—		10	0
Ypiranga-RS	2015	Série D	14	0	—		—		—		—		14	0
São José-RS	2016	Série D	0	0	9	0	—		—		—		9	0
São José-RS	2017	Série D	11	0	13	2	1	0	—		5	0	30	2
São José-RS	Total		11	0	22	2	1	0	—		5	0	39	2
Ypiranga-RS (loan)	2016	Série C	1	0	—		0	0	—		—		1	0
Avenida	2018	Gaúcho	—		15	1	—		—		—		15	1
Ypiranga-RS	2018	Série C	15	1	6	2	—		—		15	0	36	3
Avenida	2019	Série D	8	0	10	0	2	0	—		8	1	28	1
Brusque (loan)	2020	Série C	13	0	1	0	1	0	—		0	0	15	0
Brusque (loan)	2021	Série B	21	0	8	0	0	0	—		—		29	0
Brusque (loan)	Total		34	0	9	0	1	0	—		—		44	0
Manaus	2022	Série C	16	1	14	2	2	0	—		—		32	3
Ituano	2023	Série B	29	0	7	1	3	0	—		—		39	1
Ituano	2024	Série B	0	0	0	0	—		—		—		0	0
Ituano	Total		29	0	7	1	3	0	—		—		39	1
Career total			154	3	127	13	9	0	0	0	65	4	355	20

== Honours ==
São José-RS

- Copa FGF: 2015

Brusque

- Recopa Catarinense: 2020

Manaus

- Campeonato Amazonense: 2022
