= Olivedos, Paraíba =

Coordinates: 6°59′S 36°15′W

Olivedos
- Municipality
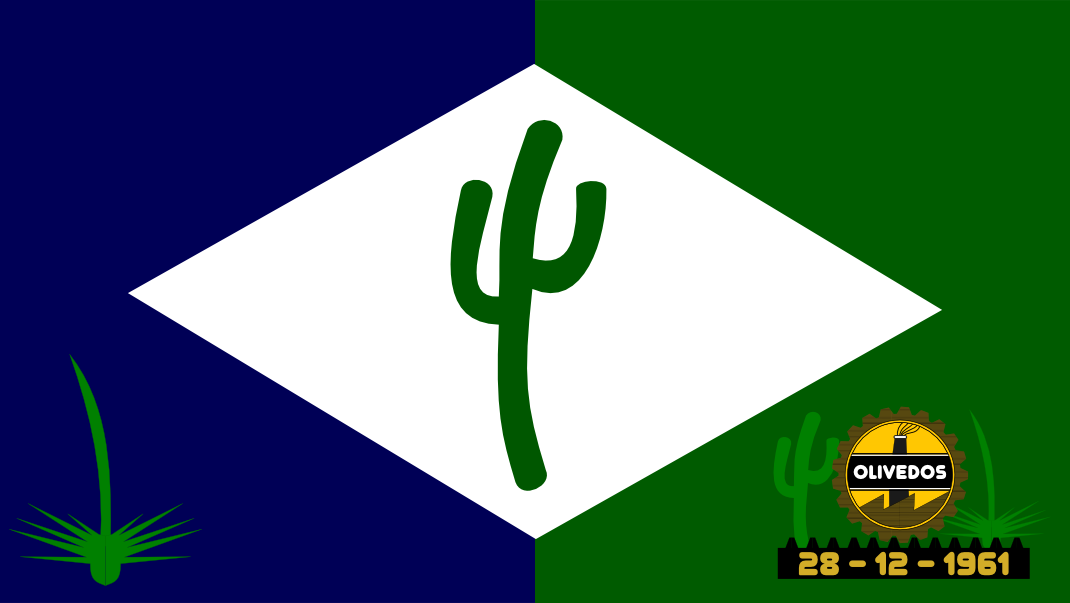
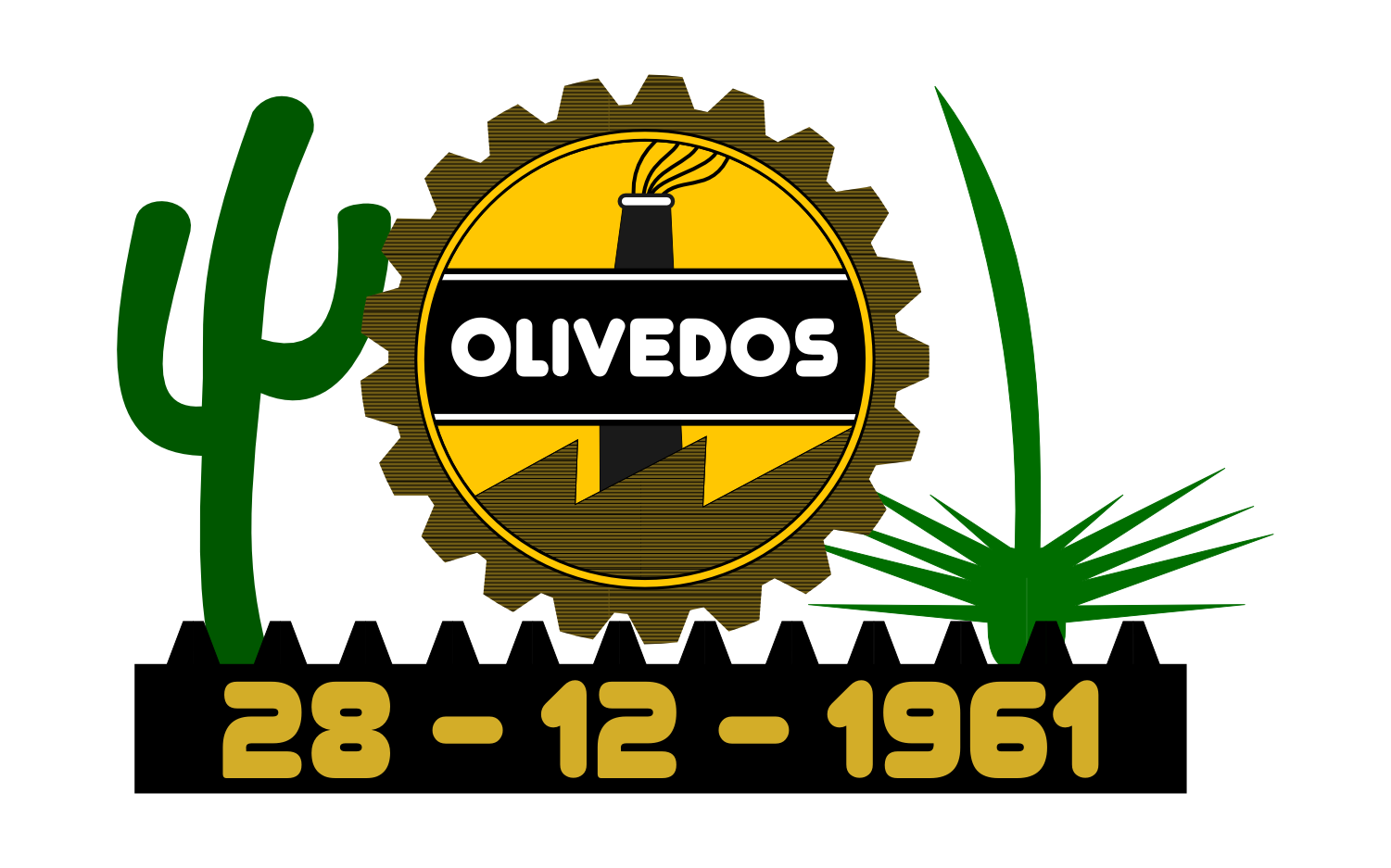
- Flag Coat of arms
- Interactive map of Olivedos
- Country: Brazil
- Region: Northeast
- State: Paraíba
- Mesoregion: Agreste Paraibano

Population (2020)
  - Total: 3,961
- Time zone: UTC−3 (BRT)

Olivedos (Central northeastern portuguese pronunciation: [oliˈvedu(s)]) is a municipality in the state of Paraíba in the Northeast Region of Brazil.

== See also ==
- List of municipalities in Paraíba
