= Buba (footballer) =

Brazilian footballer (born 1993)

Personal information
- Full name: Wesley Danilo Morais dos Santos
- Date of birth: 23 April 1993 (age 33)
- Place of birth: Caruaru, Brazil
- Height: 1.82 m (6 ft 0 in)
- Position: Forward

Team information
- Current team: Floresta

Youth career
- 2011: Corinthians

Senior career*
Years	Team	Apps	(Gls)
2011	Mogi Mirim		
2011	Porto-PE	4	(0)
2012	Corinthians	0	(0)
2012	→ Goiânia (loan)		
2013	Mogi Mirim	1	(0)
2013–2014	Oeste	1	(0)
2014	Mirassol	2	(0)
2015	América de Natal		
2015–2018	Portimonense	22	(0)
2017	→ Imabari (loan)	3	(1)
2018	→ Varzim (loan)	8	(2)
2018–2019	Praiense	14	(1)
2019–2020	Gobelins	5	(0)
2020–2021	Cianorte	38	(2)
2020	→ Freipaulistano (loan)	3	(0)
2022	Manauara		
2022	Juventus-SC	5	(0)
2022	Porto-PE		
2023	River	13	(1)
2023–	Floresta	9	(0)
- * Club domestic league appearances and goals as of 26 August 2023

Wesley Danilo Morais dos Santos (born 23 April 1993), known as Buba, is a Brazilian football player who plays for Floresta.

== Club career ==
He made his professional debut in the Campeonato Pernambucano for Porto de Caruaru on 25 January 2011 in a game against Náutico.
