= Felipe Ferreira (footballer, born 1994) =

Brazilian footballer

Personal information
- Full name: Felipe de Figueiredo Ferreira
- Date of birth: 25 April 1994 (age 32)
- Place of birth: Brasília, Brazil
- Height: 1.86 m (6 ft 1 in)
- Position: Winger

Team information
- Current team: Ypiranga
- Number: 7

Youth career
- –2014: Grêmio

Senior career*
Years	Team	Apps	(Gls)
2014–2016	Grêmio	1	(0)
2015	→ Goianiense (loan)	6	(0)
2016	→ Tubarão (loan)	4	(0)
2016	Javor Ivanjica	0	(0)
2017–2023	Ferroviária	73	(8)
2017	→ Matonense (loan)	0	(0)
2018	→ Taubaté (loan)	2	(0)
2019	→ CRB (loan)	26	(6)
2019	→ Vasco da Gama (loan)	9	(0)
2020–2021	→ Cuiabá (loan)	27	(2)
2021–2022	→ Botafogo (loan)	22	(4)
2023–2024	Retrô	0	(0)
2023	→ Chapecoense (loan)	26	(1)
2024	→ Santo André (loan)	10	(0)
2024	→ Náutico (loan)	8	(2)
2024–2025	Bhayangkara	14	(3)
2025	→ Persekat Tegal (loan)	8	(4)
2025	Retrô	6	(1)
2026–	Ypiranga	15	(0)
- * Club domestic league appearances and goals as of 10 November 2026

Felipe de Figueiredo Ferreira (born 25 April 1994) is a Brazilian professional footballer who plays as a winger for Ypiranga.

== Career ==
Born in national capital Brasília, Felipe Ferreira played in youth ranks of Grêmio, having debuted for their first team in the 2014 Campeonato Gaúcho. In 2015 he went on loan to fellow league rivals Atlético Goianiense. Upon returning to Grêmio, he played mostly for their reserves team. The year of 2016 started with a loan agreement with lower-league side Atlético Tubarão, however, it was soon interrompted as Grêmio accepted an offer for a permanent move to FK Javor Ivanjica. Felipe Ferreira arrived to Serbia and signed a 3-year contract on 1 February 2016. However, he failed to adapt and returned to Brasil without having made an official debut with Javor. After spending some time searching for a club, he signed with Ferroviária. They sent him on loan to Matonense where he played in the Campeonato Paulista A3. He started the following season with a short spell with Taubaté in the Campeonato Paulista A2, before joining Ferroviária main team for good. In April 2019 he agreed to play on loan with CRB in 2019 Campeonato Brasileiro Série B where his great performances granted him a loan move to Brazilian giants CR Vasco da Gama which got him on loan in September 2019. He made a debut with Vasco in the Brazilian highest level, 2019 Campeonato Brasileiro Série A.

== Honours ==
Botafogo

- Campeonato Brasileiro Série B: 2021

Ferroviária

- Copa Paulista: 2017
