= Associação Desportiva Jaboatão dos Guararapes =

Jaguar
- Full name: Associação Desportiva Jaboatão dos Guararapes
- Nickname: Jaguar
- Short name: ADJG
- Founded: 13 February 2012; 14 years ago
- Ground: Gileno de Carli
- Capacity: 5,459
- President: Zeca Barretto
- Head coach: Pedro Manta
- League: Campeonato Pernambucano
- 2025: Pernambucano, 7th of 10
Home colours	Away colours	Third colours

Associação Desportiva Jaboatão dos Guararapes, also known simply as Jaguar, is a Brazilian football club from Jaboatão dos Guararapes in the state of Pernambuco. The team's nickname comes from the first syllables of the words in the city's name. Founded in 2012, the team plays in the Campeonato Pernambucano, the top division of football in the state. The team won the Campeonato Pernambucano Série A2 to achieve promotion to the top flight in 2024, and was relegated in 2026.

== History ==
The club was founded on 13 February 2012 by lawyer Joaquim Naziazeno do Rego Barretto, alongside his father Zeca who was the deputy mayor of the city. Supported by the city council, the club debuted the same year in the second-tier Campeonato Pernambucano Série A2, finishing 10th.

Jaguar came 8th and 4th in the 2013 and 2014 seasons respectively, losing on penalties after a goalless draw with Vera Cruz the semi-finals of the latter. The team then dropped out of the league until the city resumed sponsorship in 2022. In 2024, the club came fourth in the regular season, and then defeated Ypiranga-PE, Vitória das Tabocas and Decisão Sertânia in the final with a single goal by league top scorer Pedro Maycon, to reach the top flight for the first time as champions.

In the 2025 Campeonato Pernambucano, Jaguar came 7th of 10, avoiding relegation but missing out on post-season. A 1–0 home win over Afogados on the final day with a goal by Daniel guaranteed a place in the league for the following season.

Jaguar was relegated from the 2026 Campeonato Pernambucano, with no wins and three draws in seven games. However, the lower leagues were abolished and a 31-team top-flight season began again for 2026–27, including Jaguar.

== Rivalry ==
Jaguar has a rivalry with Íbis from Paulista, the jokingly self-styled Pior Time do Mundo (Worst Team in the World). The clubs' rivalry is known as the Pior Clássico do Mundo (Worst Derby in the World). Íbis won six of the first eight games; at the end of the 2024 season, Íbis suffered relegation to the Campeonato Pernambucano Série A3 while Jaguar went up to the top flight for the first time.
