= Paulo Sérgio (footballer, born 1989) =

Brazilian footballer

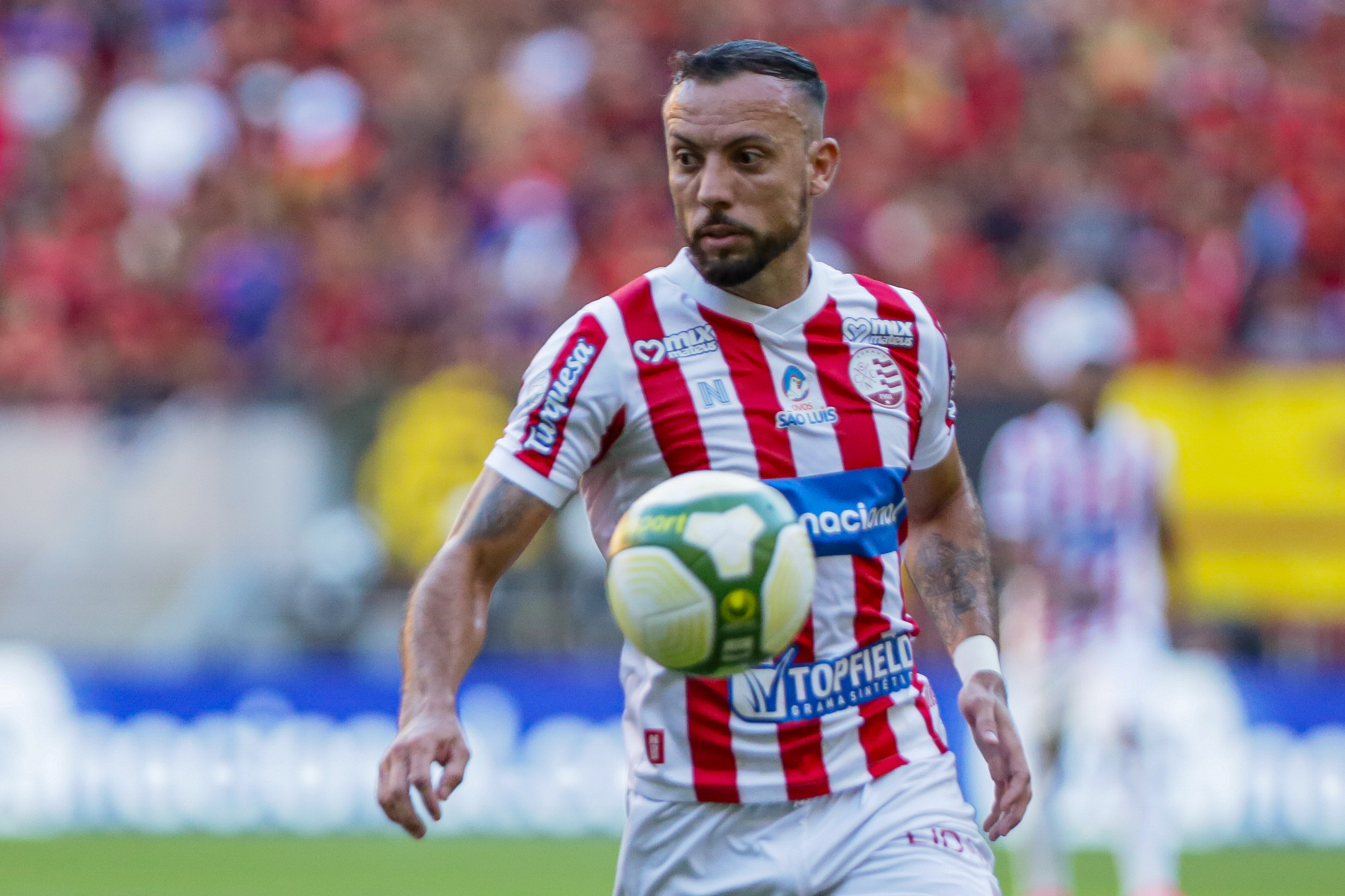

Personal information
- Full name: Paulo Sérgio Luiz de Souza
- Date of birth: 11 June 1989 (age 37)
- Place of birth: Rio de Janeiro, Rio de Janeiro , Brazil
- Height: 1.81 m (5 ft 11 in)
- Position: Forward

Team information
- Current team: Náutico
- Number: 9

Youth career
- 2006–2008: Flamengo

Senior career*
Years	Team	Apps	(Gls)
2007–2012	Flamengo	32	(4)
2009	→ Figueirense (loan)	17	(3)
2010–2011	→ Estoril (loan)	16	(3)
2011	→ Náutico (loan)	1	(0)
2013–2014	Operário	8	(8)
2013	→ Paraná (loan)	22	(6)
2014	→ Avaí (loan)	22	(6)
2015	Dubai SC		
2015	Criciúma	20	(2)
2016	Daegu FC	33	(17)
2017	Seongnam FC	7	(0)
2017–2018	Fortaleza	12	(2)
2018	Al-Qadisiyah FC	7	(1)
2019	Juventude	12	(1)
2020	FC Cascavel	6	(4)
2020	ABC	11	(10)
2020	CSA	27	(10)
2021–2021	Ponte Preta	18	(2)
2021–2023	Operário Ferroviário	65	(19)
2023	Santo André	3	(1)
2023	Al-Merrikh SC	6	(3)
2023	ABC	18	(4)
2024–	Náutico	60	(27)
- * Club domestic league appearances and goals as of 18 November 2026

Paulo Sérgio Luiz de Souza or simply Paulo Sérgio (born 11 June 1989), is a Brazilian professional footballer who plays as a forward for Náutico.

== Career ==
=== Flamengo ===
Paulo Sérgio made his professional Brazilian Série A debut for Flamengo in a 4–2 home defeat to Palmeiras on 13 May 2007. He scored first his professional goal for Flamengo in a 2–2 home draw with Botafogo in the Brazilian Série A on 27 May 2007.

=== Figueirense ===
On 26 May 2009, Flamengo loaned Paulo Sérgio to Figueirense, to play in the Brazilian Série B. He had 17 appearances and 3 goals in his loan spell.

=== Americano ===
On 26 January 2010, Paulo Sérgio was loaned to Americano to play on the 2010 Rio de Janeiro State League, but he refused to be loaned out and decided to stay with Flamengo.

=== Return and loan again ===
In the first game back in the team, scored the winning goal against Botafogo 1–0. However, even after scoring that goal was loaned again, this time for Estoril.

=== Operário ===
On 27 February 2013, Paulo Sérgio signed for Operário.

=== Seongnam FC ===
On 21 December 2016, Seongnam FC revealed the newest signing, Paulo.

== Career statistics ==
As of 18 November 2012

Appearances and goals by club, season and competition
Club	Season	League			National cup (Note: Includes Copa do Brasil, Taça da Liga.)		League cup (Note: Includes Taça de Portugal.)		Continental		Other		Total	
Club	Season	Division	Apps	Goals	Apps	Goals	Apps	Goals	Apps	Goals	Apps	Goals	Apps	Goals
Flamengo	2007	Série A	18	3	2	0			1 (Note: Appearance in Copa Libertadores)	0			21	3
Flamengo	2008	Série A	3	0	1	0							4	0
Flamengo	2009	Série A			2	0							2	0
Flamengo	2010	Série A	1	1	0	0							1	1
Flamengo	2012	Série A	2	0	1	0							3	0
Figueirense (loan)	2009	Série B	17	3									17	3
Estoril (loan)	2010–11	Liga de Honra	10	3	4	0	1	0					15	3
Náutico (loan)	2011	Série B	1	0									1	0
Seongnam FC	2017	K League 2	0	0									0	0
Career total			52	10	10	0	1	0	1	0	0	0	61	10

== Honours ==
- Flamengo youth
  - Campeonato Carioca de Juvenis: 2006
  - Campeonato Carioca de Juniores: 2007
  - Taça Guanabara: 2007, 2008
  - Taça Rio: 2009
  - Rio de Janeiro State League: 2007, 2008, 2009
