= Franklin Mascote =

Brazilian footballer (born 1996)

Mascote
Personal information
- Full name: Franklin Geovane de Santana Chagas
- Date of birth: 14 August 1996 (age 30)
- Place of birth: Candeias, Brazil
- Height: 1.88 m (6 ft 2 in)
- Position: Forward

Team information
- Current team: Botev Plovdiv
- Number: 30

Youth career
- Tiradentes-CE

Senior career*
Years	Team	Apps	(Gls)
2015–2017	Tiradentes-CE		
2016	→ Taboão da Serra (loan)		
2018	Atibaia	19	(7)
2019–2020	São Caetano		
2019	→ Braga B (loan)	11	(0)
2019–2020	→ Pouso Alegre (loan)		
2020	→ Cabofriense (loan)		
2021–2022	Lemense		
2021	→ Always Ready (loan)		
2022–2023	Retrô	22	(13)
2022	→ Brusque (loan)	8	(0)
2023	Busan IPark	13	(1)
2024–2025	Retrô	49	(12)
2025–	Botev Plovdiv	43	(13)
- * Club domestic league appearances and goals as of 31 October 2026

Franklin Geovane de Santana Chagas (born 14 August 1996), better known as Franklin Mascote or Mascote, is a Brazilian professional footballer who plays as a forward for Bulgarian First League club Botev Plovdiv.

== Career ==
Born in Candeias, Bahia, Mascote began his career in professional football with AE Tiradentes de Fortaleza. He also played for teams in the countryside of São Paulo, with emphasis on SC Atibaia (currently Lemense FC), where he won the 2018 Campeonato Paulista Série A3.

In 2021 Mascote was hired by Always Ready from Bolivia, which during the COVID-19 pandemic held a series of friendly matches in Brazil. The player was one of the club's highlights in participating in the 2021 Copa Libertadores. In April 2022 he was signed by Retrô, scoring two goals against Crato. After standing out during the 2022 Campeonato Brasileiro Série D, he was loaned to Brusque, but was unsuccessful returning later. He also had a spell at Busan IPark in the Korean second division, before returning to Retrô in 2024.

== Personal life ==
Franklin received the nickname mascot because he played as one during his childhood for his city's amateur team, Santa Cruz de Candeias.

== Honours ==
Atibaia/Lemense

- Campeonato Paulista Série A3: 2018

Pouso Alegre

- Campeonato Mineiro Segunda Divisão: 2019

Retrô

- Campeonato Brasileiro Série D: 2024
