= 2025 Campeonato Pernambucano =

Football competition

Campeonato Pernambucano
- Season: 2025
- Dates: 11 January – 2 April
- Champions: Sport Recife
- Relegated: Central; Afogados; Petrolina
- Matches played: 54
- Goals scored: 124 (2.3 per match)

The 2025 Campeonato Pernambucano (officially the Pernambucano da Série A1 de 2025) is the 111th edition of the state championship of Pernambuco organized by FPF. The championship began on 11 January and is scheduled to conclude in April 2025. Sport Recife were the defending champions.

== Format changes ==
The tournament will be contested by 10 teams. The relegation stage will not be played and the bottom three teams of the first stage will be relegated to the Campeonato Pernambucano Série A2.

== Teams ==
Ten teams competed, eight returning from 2024 and two promoted from the 2024 Campeonato Pernambucano Série A2: Decisão Sertânia and Jaguar.

Club	Home City	Manager	2024 Result
Afogados da Ingazeira Futebol Clube	Afogados da Ingazeira	Pedro Manta	6th
Central Sport Club	Caruaru	Rafael Jaques	5th
Decisão Sertânia Futebol Clube	Bonito	Nilson	2nd (Campeonato Pernambucano Série A2)
Associacao Desportiva Jaboatão dos guararapes	Jaboatão dos Guararapes		4th (Campeonato Pernambucano Série A2)
Associação Atlética Maguary	Bonito	Sued Lima	7th
Clube Náutico Capibaribe	Recife	Marquinhos Santos	3rd
Petrolina Social Futebol Clube	Petrolina		8th
Retrô Futebol Clube Brasil	Camaragibe	Milton Mendes	2nd
Santa Cruz Futebol Clube	Recife	Itamar Schülle	4th
Sport Club do Recife	Recife	Pepa	1st

== First stage ==
In the first stage, each team played the other nine teams in a single round-robin tournament. The teams were ranked according to points (3 points for a win, 1 point for a draw, and 0 points for a loss). If tied on points, the following criteria would be used to determine the ranking: 1. Wins; 2. Goal difference; 3. Goals scored; 4. Fewest red cards; 5. Fewest yellow cards; 6. Draw in the headquarters of the FPF.

Top two teams advance to the semi-finals of the final stages, while teams from third to sixth places advance to the quarter-finals. The bottom three teams are relegated to the 2026 Série A2.

Pos	Team	Pld	W	D	L	GF	GA	GD	Pts	Qualification or relegation
1	Santa Cruz	9	6	2	1	14	4	+10	20	Advance to semi-finals
2	Maguary	9	5	2	2	13	10	+3	17	Advance to semi-finals
3	Náutico	9	5	1	3	15	9	+6	16	Advance to quarter-finals
4	Sport Recife	9	4	3	2	17	8	+9	15	Advance to quarter-finals
5	Decisão	9	3	4	2	11	12	−1	13	Advance to quarter-finals
6	Retrô	9	3	3	3	8	10	−2	12	Advance to quarter-finals
7	Jaguar	9	3	2	4	10	16	−6	11	
8	Central	9	2	3	4	8	9	−1	9	Relegation to Pernambucano A2
9	Afogados	9	0	5	4	5	13	−8	5	Relegation to Pernambucano A2
10	Petrolina	9	0	3	6	4	14	−10	3	Relegation to Pernambucano A2

Updated to match(es) played on 10 February 2025. Source: FPF

== Final stages ==
Starting from the quarter-finals, the teams will play a single-elimination tournament with the following rules:

- Quarter-finals and semi-finals will be played on a single-leg basis, with the higher-seeded team hosting the leg.
  - If tied, the penalty shoot-out will be used to determine the winners.
- Finals will be played on a home-and-away two-legged basis, with the higher-seeded team hosting the second leg.
  - If tied on aggregate, the penalty shoot-out will be used to determine the winners.
- Extra time will not be played and away goals rule will not be used in final stages.

=== Bracket ===
Second Phase
3	Náutico	0 (3)
6	Retrô	0 (5)
4	Sport Recife	3
5	Decisão Sertânia	0

Semi-finals
6	Retrô	2	2	4
2	Maguary	1	0	1
4	Sport Recife	2	1	3
1	Santa Cruz	0	0	0

Finals
6	Retrô	2	2	4 (2)
4	Sport Recife	3	1	4 (4)

=== Quarter-finals ===
Team 1	Score	Team 2
Náutico	0–0 (3–5p)	Retrô
Sport Recife	3–0	Decisão Sertânia

=== Semi-finals ===
Team 1	Agg.	Team 2	1st leg	2nd leg
Retrô	4–1	Maguary	2–1	2–0
Sport Recife	3–0	Santa Cruz	2–0	1–0

=== Finals ===
Team 1	Agg.	Team 2	1st leg	2nd leg
Retrô	4–4 (2–4p)	Sport Recife	2–3	2–1
