= Associação Atlética Maguary =

Maguary
- Full name: Associação Atlética Maguary
- Nicknames: Azulão (Big Blue), Alvianil Bonitense
- Founded: 1 May 1971; 55 years ago
- Ground: Arthur Tavares de Melo
- Capacity: 4,000
- President: Ytalo Pontes
- Head coach: Sued Lima
- League: Campeonato Brasileiro Série D Campeonato Pernambucano
- 2025: Pernambucano, 4th of 10
Home colours	Away colours

Associação Atlética Maguary is a Brazilian football club from the city of Bonito in the state of Pernambuco. Founded in 1971, the team plays in the Campeonato Pernambucano, the top division of football in the state.

== History ==
Founded in 1971, Maguary was the first team to win the Campeonato Pernambucano Série A2 in 1977, when the league was created for clubs lacking the requisites to compete in the top-flight Campeonato Pernambucano. For this reason, there was no promotion, and as the league was not run again the following season, the club went on hiatus.

In May 2021, club president Ytalo Pontes registered Maguary again for Série A2, for the club's 50th anniversary. The club began competing again in the 2022 season and won promotion to the top flight for the first time after a 4–0 win over Ferroviário Esporte Clube do Cabo.

In the 2025 Campeonato Pernambucano, Maguary had a best-ever finish in second place behind Santa Cruz, and ahead of the other two major teams of the state capital Recife – Náutico and Sport. The result was secured on the final day with a goalless draw away to Santa Cruz, and gave Maguary a place in national competition for the first time, in the following year's Copa do Brasil and Campeonato Brasileiro Série D. The team lost the semi-final 4–1 on aggregate to Retrô.

In the 2026 Copa do Brasil, Maguary defeated Laguna 1–0 at home in the first round, and lost 4–3 away to Fortaleza in the second. Maguary finished 6th in the 2026 Campeonato Pernambucano, the final play-off place. The team lost 3–2 on aggregate in the quarter-finals, again to Retrô. In their debut Série D campaign, the side defeated Piauí 2–1 on aggregate in the second round, and lost 5–3 to Iguatu in the third.
