= 2024 Copa Sudamericana final =

Final match of the 23rd Copa Sudamericana edition

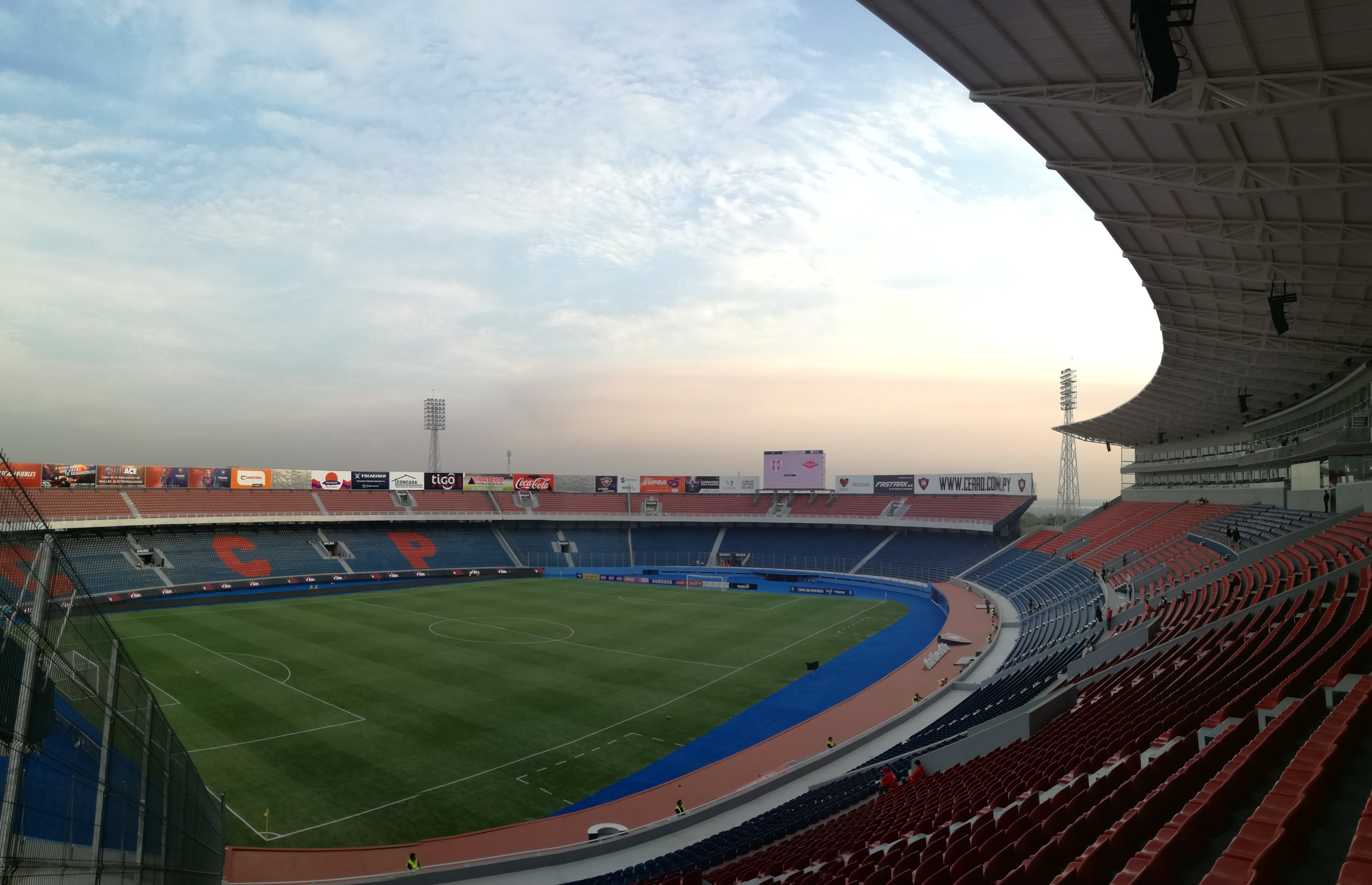
- The Estadio General Pablo Rojas in Asunción hosted the final
- Event: 2024 Copa Sudamericana
Racing	Cruzeiro
(Argentina)	(Brazil)
3	1
- Date: 23 November 2024
- Venue: Estadio General Pablo Rojas, Asunción
- Man of the Match: Maximiliano Salas (Racing)
- Referee: Esteban Ostojich (Uruguay)
- Attendance: 43,828

The 2024 Copa Sudamericana final was the final match which decided the winner of the 2024 Copa Sudamericana. This was the 23rd edition of the Copa Sudamericana, the second-tier South American continental club football tournament organized by CONMEBOL.

The match was played by Argentine club Racing and Brazilian side Cruzeiro on 23 November 2024 at the Estadio General Pablo Rojas in Asunción, Paraguay.

Racing defeated Cruzeiro 3–1 in the match to win their first Copa Sudamericana title. This was their first international title since the 1988 Supercopa Libertadores.

As winners of the 2024 Copa Sudamericana, Racing earned the right to play against the winners of the 2024 Copa Libertadores in the 2025 Recopa Sudamericana. They also automatically qualified for the 2025 Copa Libertadores group stage.

== Venue ==
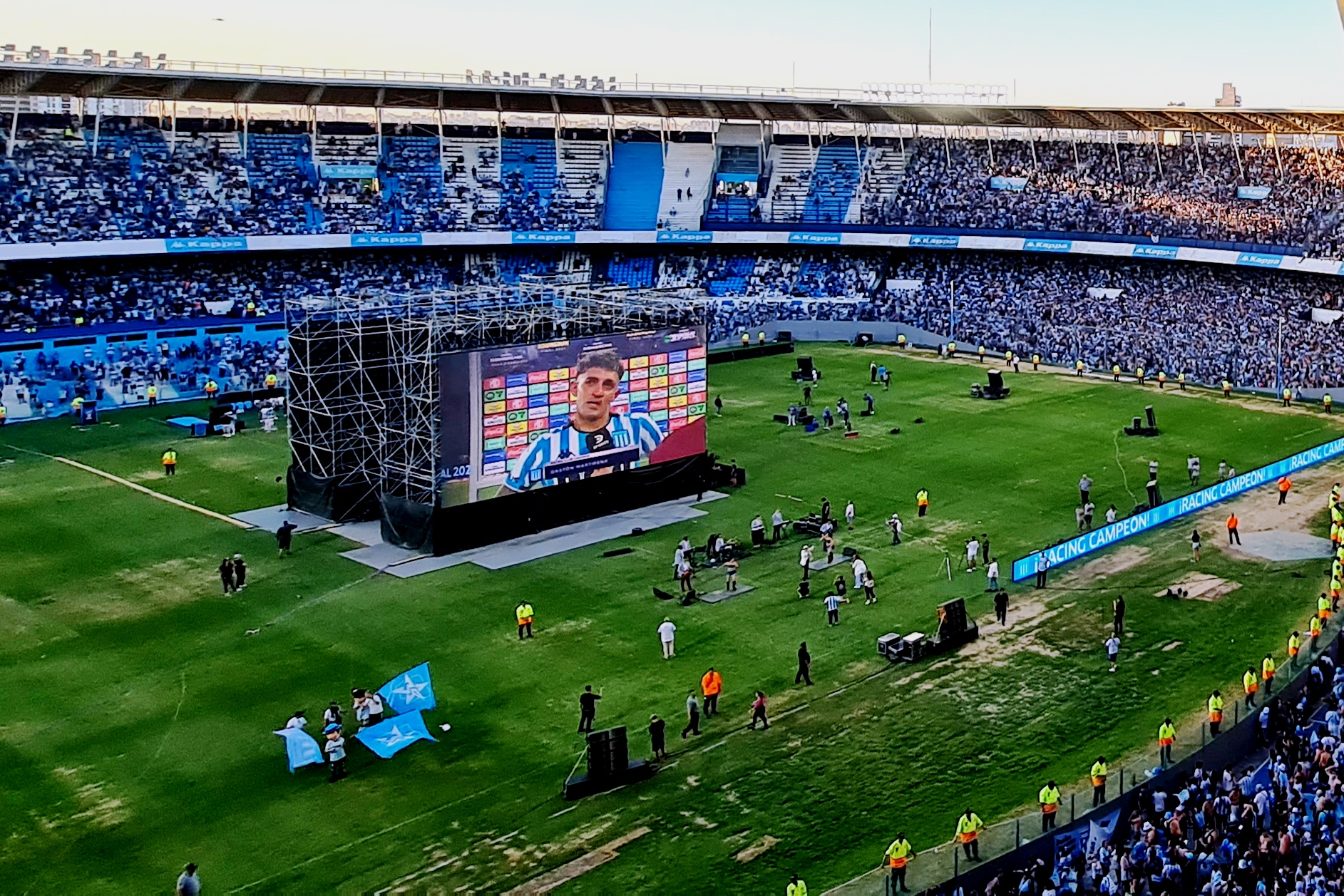
A giant screen was set up on the field at El Cilindro in Avellaneda for Racing fans who could not travel to Paraguay to watch the match.

On 10 April 2024, CONMEBOL announced the cities selected to host the finals of the 2024 and 2025 Copa Sudamericana editions, with Asunción being appointed for the 2024 final at a stadium to be confirmed. Shortly afterwards, the confederation confirmed that it would invest funds on improvements to the infrastructure of stadiums that had been put forward as potential hosts for the finals of the Copa Libertadores and the Copa Sudamericana, which in the latter's case were Estadio Defensores del Chaco, Estadio General Pablo Rojas (also known as "La Nueva Olla"), Estadio Osvaldo Domínguez Dibb, and Estadio La Huerta.

On 7 October 2024, CONMEBOL president Alejandro Domínguez confirmed Estadio General Pablo Rojas as the venue for the final match. This was the second Copa Sudamericana final played at the stadium, after the 2019 one in which Ecuadorian side Independiente del Valle defeated Colón from Argentina.

== Teams ==
Team	Previous finals appearances (bold indicates winners)
(Argentina) Racing	None
(Brazil) Cruzeiro	None

== Road to the final ==
Note: In all scores below, the score of the home team is given first.

(Argentina) Racing			Round	(Brazil) Cruzeiro		
Opponent	Venue	Score		Opponent	Venue	Score
Bye			First stage	Bye		
**Group H**			Group stage	**Group B**		
(Paraguay) Sportivo Luqueño	Away	0–2	Group stage	(Ecuador) Universidad Católica	Away	0–0
(Brazil) Red Bull Bragantino	Home	3–0	Group stage	(Colombia) Alianza	Home	3–3
(Chile) Coquimbo Unido	Away	1–2	Group stage	(Chile) Unión La Calera	Away	0–0
(Brazil) Red Bull Bragantino	Away	2–1	Group stage	(Colombia) Alianza	Away	0–3
(Chile) Coquimbo Unido	Home	3–0	Group stage	(Chile) Unión La Calera	Home	1–0
(Paraguay) Sportivo Luqueño	Home	3–0	Group stage	(Ecuador) Universidad Católica	Home	1–0
Pos / Team / Pld / Pts; **1** / (Argentina) Racing / **6** / **15**; 2 / (Brazil) Red Bull Bragantino / 6 / **13**; 3 / (Chile) Coquimbo Unido / 6 / **5**; 4 / (Paraguay) Sportivo Luqueño / 6 / **1**; Source: CONMEBOL			Group stage	Pos / Team / Pld / Pts; **1** / (Brazil) Cruzeiro / **6** / **12**; 2 / (Ecuador) Universidad Católica / 6 / **11**; 3 / (Colombia) Alianza / 6 / **5**; 4 / (Chile) Unión La Calera / 6 / **4**; Source: CONMEBOL		
**Seed 1**			Final stages	**Seed 7**		
Bye			Knockout round play-offs	Bye		
(Chile) Huachipato (won 8–1 on aggregate)	Away	0–2	Round of 16	(Argentina) Boca Juniors (tied 2–2 on aggregate, won on penalties)	Away	1–0
(Chile) Huachipato (won 8–1 on aggregate)	Home	6–1	Round of 16	(Argentina) Boca Juniors (tied 2–2 on aggregate, won on penalties)	Home	2–1 (5–4 p)
(Brazil) Athletico Paranaense (won 4–2 on aggregate)	Away	1–0	Quarter-finals	(Paraguay) Libertad (won 3–1 on aggregate)	Away	0–2
(Brazil) Athletico Paranaense (won 4–2 on aggregate)	Home	4–1	Quarter-finals	(Paraguay) Libertad (won 3–1 on aggregate)	Home	1–1
(Brazil) Corinthians (won 4–3 on aggregate)	Away	2–2	Semi-finals	(Argentina) Lanús (won 2–1 on aggregate)	Home	1–1
(Brazil) Corinthians (won 4–3 on aggregate)	Home	2–1	Semi-finals	(Argentina) Lanús (won 2–1 on aggregate)	Away	0–1

== Format ==
The final was played as a single match at a pre-selected venue, with the higher-seeded team designated as the "home" team for administrative purposes. If scores were level after full time, 30 minutes of extra time would be played. If still tied after extra time, a penalty shoot-out would be used to determine the winners.

== Match ==
=== Details ===
23 November 2024
17:00 UTC−3

Racing (Argentina)	3–1	(Brazil) Cruzeiro
Martirena 15'; A. Martínez 20'; R. Martínez 90+5'	Report	Kaio Jorge 52'

Estadio General Pablo Rojas, Asunción
Attendance: 43,828
Referee: Esteban Ostojich (Uruguay)

**Racing**	**Cruzeiro**

GK	21	(Chile) Gabriel Arias (c)
CB	3	(Argentina) Marco Di Cesare	(yellow card) 83'
CB	13	(Argentina) Santiago Sosa
CB	2	(Argentina) Agustín García Basso	(yellow card) 59'
RM	15	(Uruguay) Gastón Martirena
CM	5	(Argentina) Juan Nardoni	(yellow card) 81'
CM	32	(Argentina) Agustín Almendra		(substituted off) 56'
LM	27	(Argentina) Gabriel Rojas
RF	8	(Colombia) Juan Fernando Quintero		(substituted off) 87'
CF	9	(Argentina) Adrián Martínez		(substituted off) 75'
LF	7	(Argentina) Maximiliano Salas
Substitutes:
GK	25	(Argentina) Facundo Cambeses
DF	6	(Argentina) Nazareno Colombo
DF	30	(Argentina) Leonardo Sigali
DF	34	(Argentina) Facundo Mura
DF	35	(Argentina) Santiago Quirós
MF	4	(Uruguay) Martín Barrios
MF	22	(Argentina) Baltasar Rodríguez
MF	36	(Argentina) Bruno Zuculini		(substituted on) 56'
FW	10	(Colombia) Roger Martínez	(yellow card) 90+6'	(substituted on) 75'
FW	12	(Argentina) Luciano Vietto
FW	17	(Colombia) Johan Carbonero
FW	28	(Argentina) Santiago Solari		(substituted on) 87'
Manager:
(Argentina) Gustavo Costas

GK	1	(Brazil) Cássio
RB	12	(Brazil) William
CB	43	(Brazil) João Marcelo
CB	25	(Argentina) Lucas Villalba
LB	3	(Brazil) Marlon		(substituted off) 85'
CM	29	(Argentina) Lucas Romero (c)	(yellow card) 42'	(substituted off) 78'
CM	20	(Brazil) Walace		(substituted off) 30'
RW	30	(Brazil) Gabriel Veron		(substituted off) 78'
AM	10	(Brazil) Matheus Pereira	(yellow card) 82'
LW	97	(Brazil) Matheus Henrique
CF	19	(Brazil) Kaio Jorge
Substitutes:
GK	98	(Brazil) Anderson
DF	2	(Brazil) Wesley
DF	5	(Brazil) Zé Ivaldo
DF	6	(Brazil) Kaiki Bruno
DF	34	(Brazil) Jonathan Jesus
MF	7	(Brazil) Mateus Vital
MF	16	(Brazil) Lucas Silva	(yellow card) 45+3'	(substituted on) 30'
MF	17	(Brazil) Ramiro
MF	21	(Argentina) Álvaro Barreal		(substituted on) 78'
MF	33	(Paraguay) Fabrizio Peralta
FW	26	(Argentina) Lautaro Díaz		(substituted on) 78'
FW	69	(Brazil) Kaique Kenji		(substituted on) 85'
Manager:
(Brazil) Fernando Diniz

Man of the Match:
Maximiliano Salas (Racing)

Assistant referees:
Nicolás Tarán (Uruguay)
Carlos Barreiro (Uruguay)
Fourth official:
Gustavo Tejera (Uruguay)
Fifth official:
Eduardo Britos (Paraguay)
Video assistant referee:
Leodán González (Uruguay)
Assistant video assistant referees:
Richard Trinidad (Uruguay)
Derlis López (Paraguay)
Andrés Cunha (Uruguay)

**Match rules**
- 90 minutes.
- 30 minutes of extra time if necessary.
- Penalty shoot-out if scores still level.
- Twelve named substitutes.
- Maximum of five substitutions, with a sixth allowed in extra time.

== See also ==
- 2024 Copa Libertadores final
