= 2025 Recopa Sudamericana =

CONMEBOL Recopa Sudamericana 2025
Racing	Botafogo
(Argentina)	(Brazil)
4	0
- on aggregate

First leg
Racing	Botafogo
2	0
- Date: 20 February 2025
- Venue: Estadio Presidente Perón, Avellaneda
- Referee: Felipe González (Chile)

Second leg
Botafogo	Racing
0	2
- Date: 27 February 2025
- Venue: Estádio Olímpico Nilton Santos, Rio de Janeiro
- Referee: Jesús Valenzuela (Venezuela)

The 2025 CONMEBOL Recopa Sudamericana (Portuguese: CONMEBOL Recopa Sul-Americana de 2025) was the 33rd edition of the CONMEBOL Recopa Sudamericana (also referred to as the Recopa Sudamericana), the football competition organized by CONMEBOL between the winners of the previous season's two major South American club tournaments, the Copa Libertadores and the Copa Sudamericana.

The competition was contested in a two-legged home-and-away format between Brazilian team Botafogo, the 2024 Copa Libertadores champions, and Argentine team Racing, the 2024 Copa Sudamericana champions. The first leg was hosted by Racing at Estadio Presidente Perón in Avellaneda, Argentina on 20 February 2025 while the second leg was hosted by Botafogo at Estádio Olímpico Nilton Santos in Rio de Janeiro, Brazil on 27 February 2025.

Racing were the champions, winning their first Recopa Sudamericana title after defeating Botafogo 4–0 on aggregate.

== Teams ==
This was the second Recopa Sudamericana participation for both Botafogo and Racing. The former played the 1994 edition which they lost to fellow Brazilian side São Paulo, while the latter previously contested the Recopa in 1989, losing to Nacional from Uruguay.

Team	Qualification	Previous appearances (bold indicates winners)
(Brazil) Botafogo	2024 Copa Libertadores champions	1 (1994)
(Argentina) Racing	2024 Copa Sudamericana champions	1 (1989)

== Format ==
The Recopa Sudamericana was played on a home-and-away two-legged basis, with the Copa Libertadores champions hosting the second leg. If tied on aggregate at the end of the second leg, 30 minutes of extra time would be played. If still tied after extra time, a penalty shoot-out would be used to determine the winners (Regulations Article 17).

== Matches ==
After winning the 2024 Copa Libertadores and the 2024 Série A, coach Artur Jorge left Botafogo on 3 January 2025 to take charge of Qatari team Al-Rayyan. Botafogo initially had interim coach Carlos Leiria, coach of the U-20 team, who led the team in the 2025 Supercopa do Brasil and the early rounds of the 2025 Campeonato Carioca. Due to poor results, Carlos Leiria was replaced by Cláudio Caçapa, who was also appointed as interim coach. Caçapa was in charge of both legs of the Recopa Sudamericana, although on the day of the second leg, 27 February 2025, Botafogo announced Renato Paiva as their new coach.

Nathan Fernandes and Bastos (Botafogo) and Agustín García Basso and Santiago Sosa (Racing) missed both matches while David Ricardo, Jeffinho and Artur (Botafogo) missed the first leg due to injuries.

Gregore (Botafogo) missed the first leg and Cuiabano (Botafogo) missed the second leg due to suspension.

=== First leg ===
20 February 2025
21:30 UTC−3

Racing (Argentina)	2–0	(Brazil) Botafogo
Vietto 31' (pen.); Martínez 63'	Report

Estadio Presidente Perón, Avellaneda
Referee: Felipe González (Chile)

**Racing**	**Botafogo**

GK	21	(Chile) Gabriel Arias (c)
CB	3	(Argentina) Marco Di Cesare	(yellow card) 16'
CB	23	(Argentina) Nazareno Colombo
CB	35	(Argentina) Santiago Quirós
RM	15	(Uruguay) Gastón Martirena	(yellow card) 81'
CM	36	(Argentina) Bruno Zuculini	(yellow card) 41'
CM	5	(Argentina) Juan Nardoni	(yellow card) 82'
LM	27	(Argentina) Gabriel Rojas
RF	10	(Argentina) Luciano Vietto		(substituted off) 36'
CF	9	(Argentina) Adrián Martínez
LF	7	(Argentina) Maximiliano Salas		(substituted off) 89'
Substitutes:
GK	25	(Argentina) Facundo Cambeses
DF	20	(Argentina) Germán Conti
DF	34	(Argentina) Facundo Mura
MF	11	(Argentina) Matías Zaracho		(substituted on) 36'
MF	16	(Uruguay) Martín Barrios
MF	19	(Argentina) Ignacio Rodríguez		(substituted on) 89'
MF	24	(Argentina) Adrián Fernández
MF	32	(Argentina) Agustín Almendra
MF	37	(Argentina) Baltasar Rodríguez
FW	28	(Argentina) Santiago Solari
FW	41	(Argentina) Ramiro Degregorio
FW	77	(Uruguay) Adrián Balboa
Manager:
(Argentina) Gustavo Costas

GK	12	(Brazil) John
RB	2	(Brazil) Vitinho
CB	5	(Brazil) Danilo Barbosa	(yellow card) 45+3'
CB	20	(Argentina) Alexander Barboza	(yellow card) 29'
LB	13	(Brazil) Alex Telles
DM	25	(Brazil) Allan		(substituted off) 59'
CM	28	(Brazil) Newton	(yellow card) 70'
CM	17	(Brazil) Marlon Freitas (c)
RF	10	(Venezuela) Jefferson Savarino		(substituted off) 88'
CF	99	(Brazil) Igor Jesus
LF	11	(Brazil) Matheus Martins		(substituted off) 76'
Substitutes:
GK	24	(Brazil) Léo Linck
DF	4	(Uruguay) Mateo Ponte
DF	32	(Brazil) Jair Cunha
DF	63	(Brazil) Serafim
DF	66	(Brazil) Cuiabano	(red card) 87'	(substituted on) 76'
MF	6	(Brazil) Patrick de Paula
MF	18	(Brazil) Kauê		(substituted on) 88'
MF	37	(Brazil) Vitinho Lopes
FW	9	(Brazil) Rwan Cruz	(yellow card) 72'	(substituted on) 59'
FW	19	(Brazil) Kayke
FW	67	(Brazil) Yarlen
FW	69	(Brazil) Rafael Lobato
Manager:
(Brazil) Cláudio Caçapa (caretaker)

Assistant referees:
José Retamal (Chile)
Miguel Rocha (Chile)
Fourth official:
Augusto Aragón (Ecuador)
Fifth official:
Ricardo Baren (Ecuador)
Video assistant referee:
Rodrigo Carvajal (Chile)
Assistant video assistant referees:
Edson Cisternas (Chile)
Benjamín Saravia (Chile)
Francisco Gilabert (Chile)

Match rules:

- 90 minutes.
- Twelve named substitutes, of which up to five may be used.

=== Second leg ===
27 February 2025
21:30 UTC−3

Botafogo (Brazil)	0–2	(Argentina) Racing
	Report	Zaracho 50'; Zuculini 69'

Estádio Olímpico Nilton Santos, Rio de Janeiro
Referee: Jesús Valenzuela (Venezuela)

**Botafogo**	**Racing**

GK	12	(Brazil) John
RB	2	(Brazil) Vitinho		(substituted off) 80'
CB	32	(Brazil) Jair Cunha	(yellow card) 53'
CB	20	(Argentina) Alexander Barboza	(yellow card) 66'
LB	13	(Brazil) Alex Telles
CM	26	(Brazil) Gregore	(yellow card) 17'	(substituted off) 55'
CM	17	(Brazil) Marlon Freitas (c)
AM	10	(Venezuela) Jefferson Savarino		(substituted off) 80'
RF	7	(Brazil) Artur		(substituted off) 55'
CF	99	(Brazil) Igor Jesus
LF	11	(Brazil) Matheus Martins		(substituted off) 70'
Substitutes:
GK	24	(Brazil) Léo Linck
DF	4	(Uruguay) Mateo Ponte		(substituted on) 80'
DF	57	(Brazil) David Ricardo
MF	5	(Brazil) Danilo Barbosa
MF	6	(Brazil) Patrick de Paula
MF	18	(Brazil) Kauê
MF	25	(Brazil) Allan
MF	28	(Brazil) Newton		(substituted on) 80'
FW	9	(Brazil) Rwan Cruz		(substituted on) 55'
FW	19	(Brazil) Kayke		(substituted on) 70'
FW	47	(Brazil) Jeffinho		(substituted on) 55'
FW	69	(Brazil) Rafael Lobato
Manager:
(Brazil) Cláudio Caçapa (caretaker)

GK	21	(Chile) Gabriel Arias (c)	(yellow card) 71'
CB	3	(Argentina) Marco Di Cesare		(substituted off) 57'
CB	23	(Argentina) Nazareno Colombo
CB	35	(Argentina) Santiago Quirós
RM	15	(Uruguay) Gastón Martirena		(substituted off) 85'
CM	36	(Argentina) Bruno Zuculini		(substituted off) 78'
CM	5	(Argentina) Juan Nardoni	(yellow card) 67'
LM	27	(Argentina) Gabriel Rojas
RF	10	(Argentina) Luciano Vietto	(yellow card) 33'	(substituted off) 46'
CF	9	(Argentina) Adrián Martínez	(yellow card) 49'	(substituted off) 86'
LF	7	(Argentina) Maximiliano Salas
Substitutes:
GK	1	(Argentina) Francisco Gómez
GK	25	(Argentina) Facundo Cambeses
DF	20	(Argentina) Germán Conti		(substituted on) 57'
DF	34	(Argentina) Facundo Mura		(substituted on) 85'
MF	11	(Argentina) Matías Zaracho		(substituted on) 46'
MF	16	(Uruguay) Martín Barrios
MF	19	(Argentina) Ignacio Rodríguez
MF	32	(Argentina) Agustín Almendra		(substituted on) 78'
MF	37	(Argentina) Baltasar Rodríguez
FW	28	(Argentina) Santiago Solari		(substituted on) 86'
FW	41	(Argentina) Ramiro Degregorio
FW	77	(Uruguay) Adrián Balboa
Manager:
(Argentina) Gustavo Costas

Assistant referees:
Jorge Urrego (Venezuela)
Tulio Moreno (Venezuela)
Fourth official:
Gery Vargas (Bolivia)
Fifth official:
José Antelo (Bolivia)
Video assistant referee:
Juan Soto (Venezuela)
Assistant video assistant referees:
Alexander Guzmán (Colombia)
Leonard Mosquera (Colombia)
Jhon Perdomo (Colombia)

Match rules:

- 90 minutes.
- 30 minutes of extra time if tied on aggregate (away goals rule not applied).
- Penalty shoot-out if still tied on aggregate after extra time.
- Twelve named substitutes.
- Maximum of five substitutions, with a sixth allowed in extra time.
