= Germán Conti =

Argentine footballer

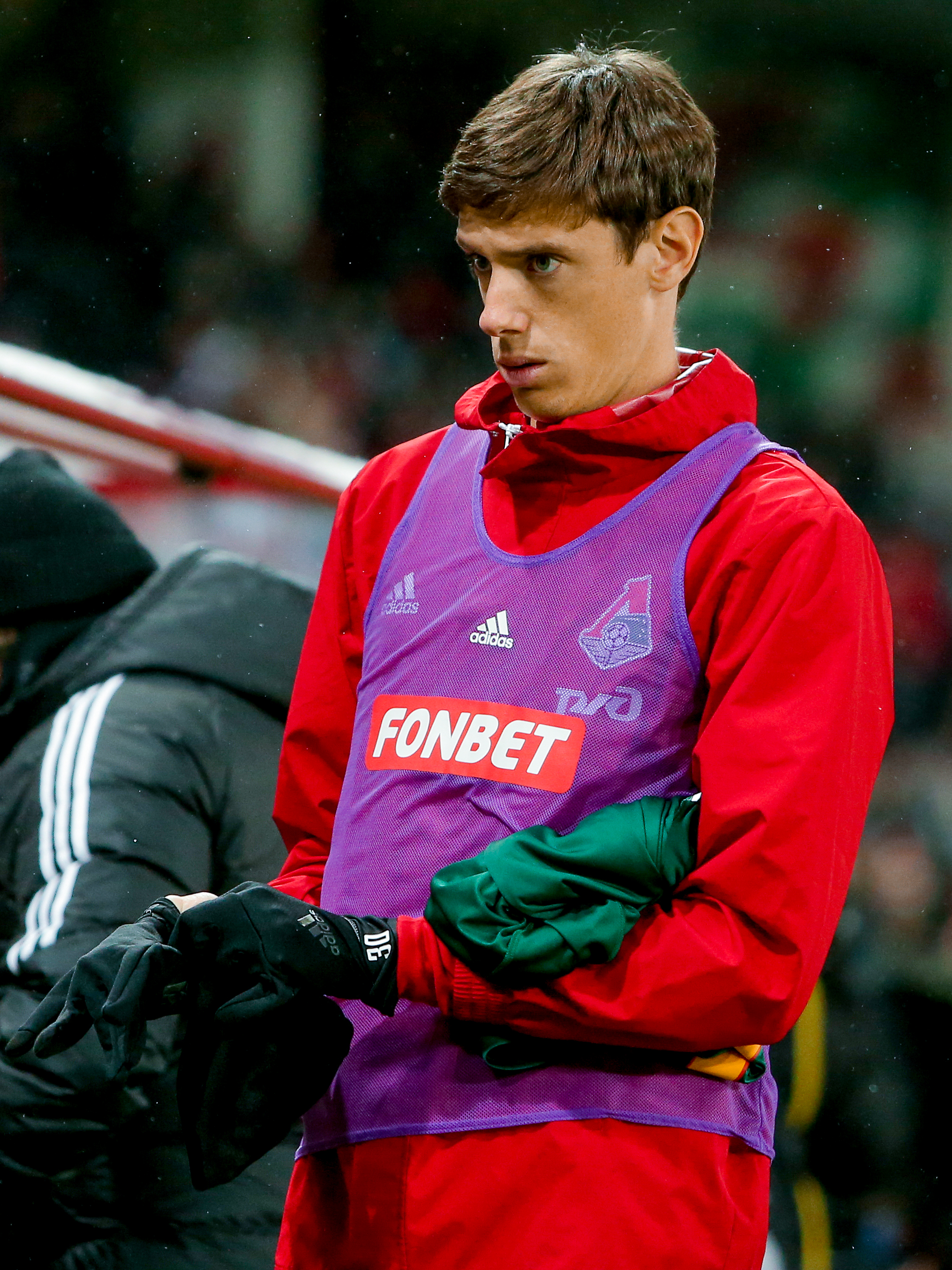
- Conti in 2023

Personal information
- Full name: Germán Andrés Conti
- Date of birth: 3 June 1994 (age 32)
- Place of birth: Santa Fe, Argentina
- Height: 1.93 m (6 ft 4 in)
- Position: Centre-back

Team information
- Current team: Gimnasia LP (on loan from Racing Club)
- Number: 13

Youth career
- 2012–2013: Colón

Senior career*
Years	Team	Apps	(Gls)
2013–2018	Colón	115	(4)
2018–2023	Benfica	4	(0)
2019	Benfica B	2	(0)
2020	→ Atlas (loan)	21	(1)
2021	→ Bahia (loan)	28	(0)
2022	→ América Mineiro (loan)	23	(0)
2023–2024	Lokomotiv Moscow	3	(0)
2023	→ Colón (loan)	8	(0)
2024–	Racing Club	14	(0)
2025–	→ Gimnasia LP (loan)	15	(0)
- * Club domestic league appearances and goals as of 17:14, 9 July 2026 (UTC)

Germán Andrés Conti (born 3 June 1994) is an Argentine professional footballer who plays as a centre back for Gimnasia LP, on loan from Racing Club.

== Career ==
Born in Santa Fe, Conti began his career in the youth system of local club Colón. Following his progression, he debuted for the senior team in a league match against Club Olimpo on 8 December 2013, aged 19. After starting playing as a first choice on 15 July 2015, he became captain of Colón. With them, he amassed totals of 119 matches and 9 goals before signing a five-year contract with Portuguese club S.L. Benfica on 25 May 2018.

On 30 December 2019, Conti moved to Liga MX club Atlas, on a loan deal until December 2020.

On 12 March 2021, Conti moved on loan to Brazilian side Bahia.

On 6 January 2022, Conti moved on loan to América Mineiro.

On 30 January 2023, Conti signed a two-and-a-half-year contract with Russian Premier League club FC Lokomotiv Moscow.

== Honours ==
Benfica

- Primeira Liga: 2018–19
- Supertaça Cândido de Oliveira: 2019

Bahia

- Copa do Nordeste: 2021

Racing Club

- Copa Sudamericana: 2024
- Recopa Sudamericana: 2025
