= Baltasar Rodríguez =

Argentine footballer (born 2003)

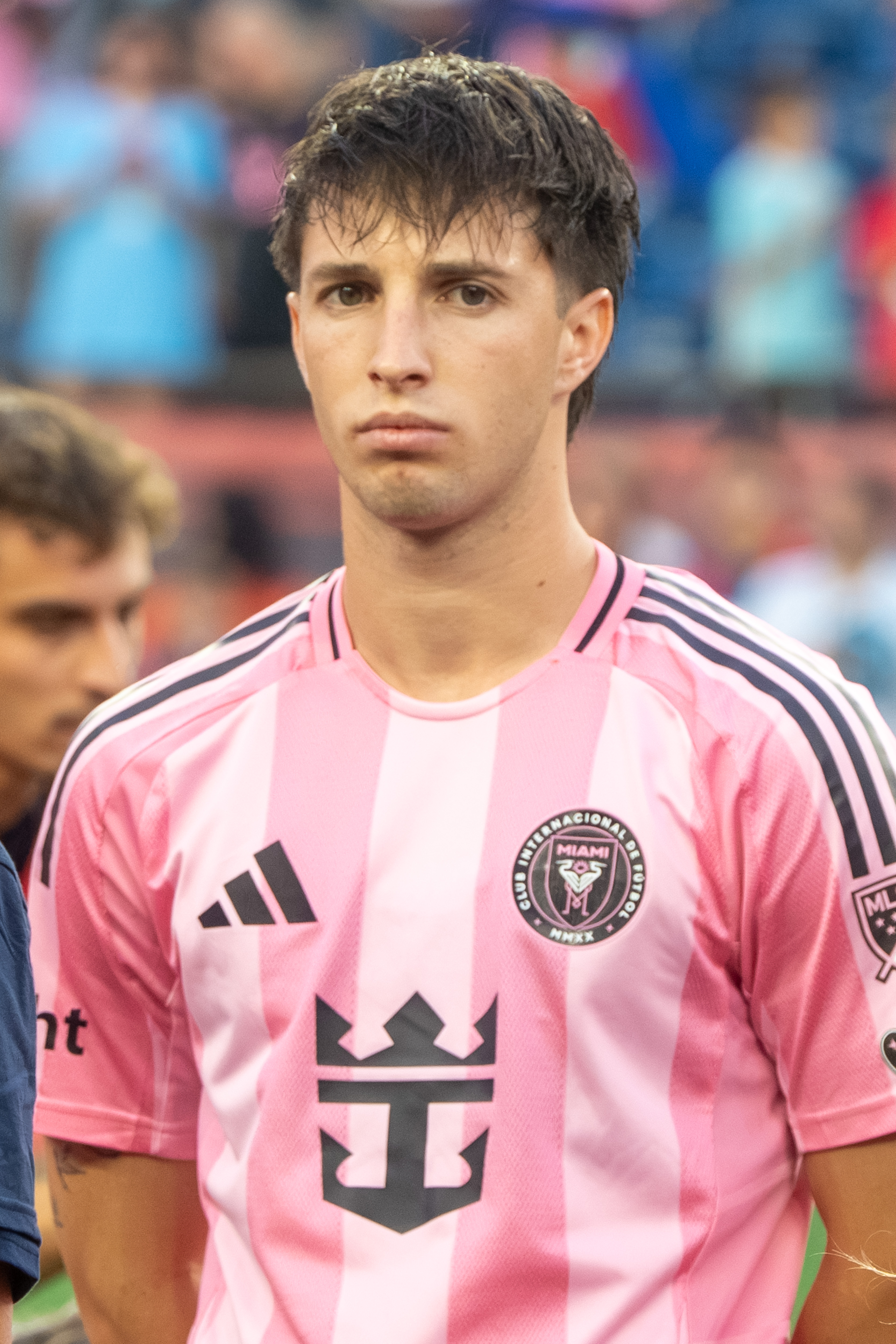
- Rodríguez with Inter Miami in 2025

Personal information
- Full name: Baltasar Luis Gallego Rodríguez
- Date of birth: 9 July 2003 (age 23)
- Place of birth: Monte Hermoso, Argentina
- Height: 1.73 m (5 ft 8 in)
- Position: Midfielder

Team information
- Current team: Estudiantes
- Number: 31

Senior career*
Years	Team	Apps	(Gls)
2023–2026	Racing Club	66	(6)
2025	→ Inter Miami (loan)	20	(3)
2026–	Estudiantes	10	(0)

International career^{‡}
2024–	Argentina U23	5	(1)
- * Club domestic league appearances and goals as of 17:40, 21 November 2026 (UTC) ‡ National team caps and goals as of 13:00, 2 September 2024 (UTC)

Baltasar Luis Gallego Rodríguez (born 9 July 2003) is an Argentine footballer who plays as a midfielder for Estudiantes.

He began his career at Racing Club, where he won the Copa Sudamericana in 2024 and the Recopa Sudamericana in 2025. While on loan to Inter Miami CF, he won MLS Cup 2025. In 2026, he signed for Estudiantes.

== Club career ==
Born in Monte Hermoso in Buenos Aires Province, Rodríguez joined the youth ranks of Racing Club de Avellaneda from his hometown club in 2019. His agent is Robert Pires, 1998 FIFA World Cup champion with the France national football team.

In August 2022, Rodríguez signed his first professional contract to tie himself to Racing until the end of 2026, with a release clause of €20 million. He made his debut in the Argentine Primera División on 8 May 2023 in a 4–2 home loss to Talleres de Córdoba; he came on as a 55th-minute substitute for Gabriel Hauche and became the first top-flight player from his town. His continental bow came on 8 June in a 2–1 Copa Libertadores group loss to Flamengo in the Maracanã Stadium. On 19 August he started the game away to Unión de Santa Fe and scored his first goal to open a 1–1 draw for the club managed by Fernando Gago. He finished his first season with five goals.

On 20 August 2024, Rodríguez scored his first continental goal to start a 6–1 win over Chile's Huachipato FC at El Cilindro, putting his side into the quarter-finals of the Copa Sudamericana 8–1 on aggregate. His team won the final 3–1 over Brazil's Cruzeiro in Asunción, though he was an unused substitute.

After winning the 2025 Recopa Sudamericana with Racing over Botafogo, Rodríguez moved to Major League Soccer club Inter Miami CF on loan. He was signed by Javier Mascherano, his former Argentina U-23 manager. He made his debut on 14 May as a half-time substitute for Benjamin Cremaschi, and assisted the equaliser by compatriot Tadeo Allende in a 3–3 draw away to the San Jose Earthquakes. On 23 August, he scored his first goal to equalise in a 1–1 draw at D.C. United, nine minutes after coming on as a substitute. On 6 December, he played in MLS Cup 2025, a 3–1 home win over Vancouver Whitecaps FC, making way for Telasco Segovia after 57 minutes.

On 8 August 2026, Rodríguez transferred to Estudiantes on a four-year deal. The club obtained 50% of his economic rights, rising to 80% upon completion of criteria, with neither the criteria or the transfer fee being disclosed.

== International career ==
Rodríguez was part of the Argentina national under-23 football team at the 2024 CONMEBOL Pre-Olympic Tournament. He played five games as the team won their group, scoring to begin a 3–3 draw with Uruguay on 2 February.

== Honours ==
Racing Club

- Copa Sudamericana: 2024
- Recopa Sudamericana: 2025

Inter Miami

- MLS Cup: 2025
