= Gabriel Rojas (footballer, born 1997) =

Argentine footballer

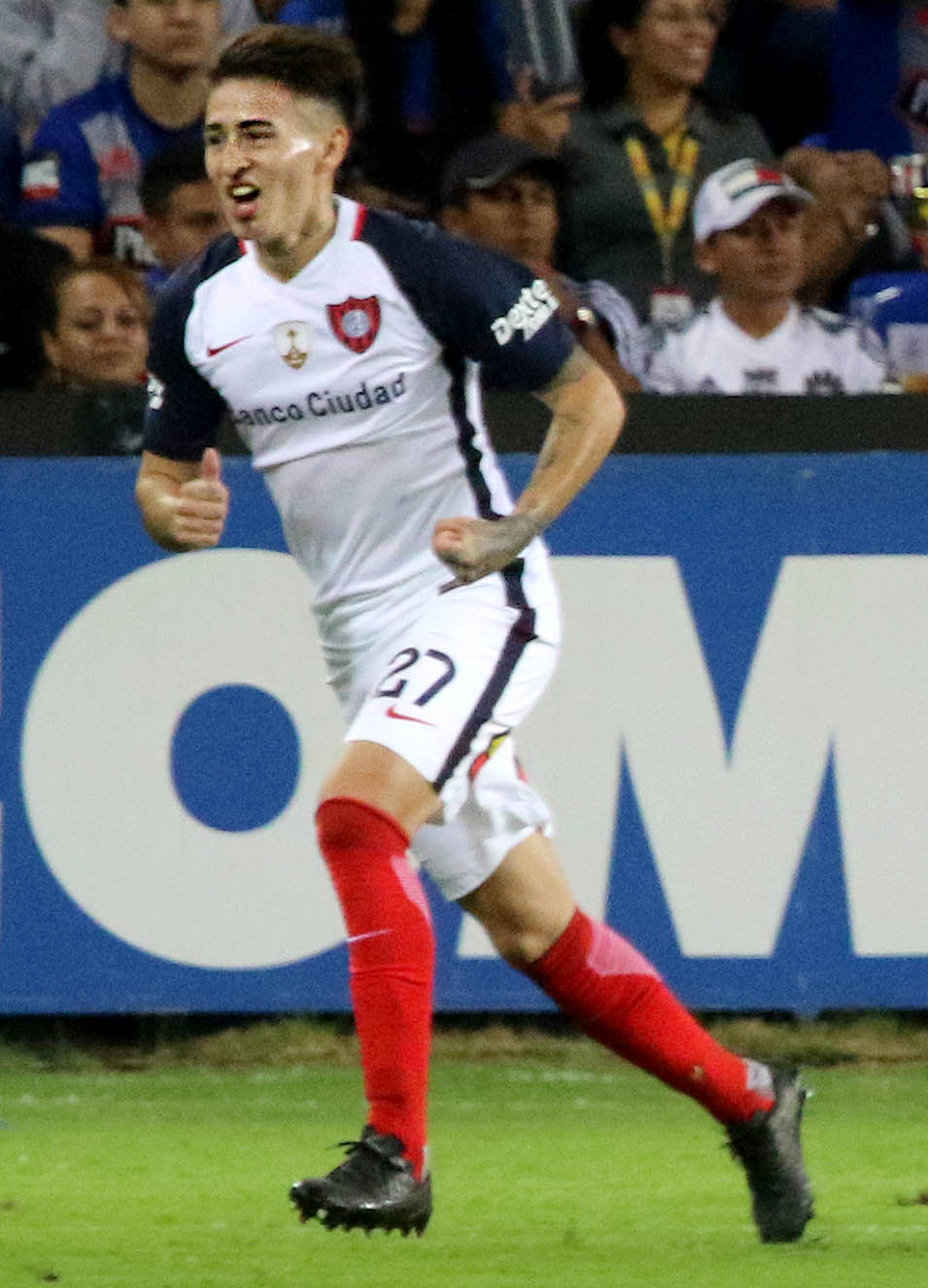
- Rojas playing for San Lorenzo in 2017

Personal information
- Full name: Gabriel Hernán Rojas
- Date of birth: 22 June 1997 (age 29)
- Place of birth: Burzaco, Argentina
- Height: 1.78 m (5 ft 10 in)
- Position: Left-back

Team information
- Current team: Cruzeiro

Youth career
- Club Arzeno
- Atletico Pueyrredón

Senior career*
Years	Team	Apps	(Gls)
2016–2022	San Lorenzo	70	(1)
2019–2020	→ Peñarol (loan)	21	(0)
2022–2023	Querétaro	19	(0)
2023–2026	Racing Club	98	(3)
2026–	Cruzeiro	0	(0)

International career^{‡}
2016	Argentina U20	2	(0)
2026–	Argentina	1	(0)
- * Club domestic league appearances and goals as of 18:05, 28 June 2026 (UTC) ‡ National team caps and goals as of 27 March 2026

Gabriel Hernán Rojas (born 22 June 1997) is an Argentine professional footballer who plays as a left-back for Campeonato Brasileiro Série A club Cruzeiro EC and Argentina national team

== Club career ==
Rojas had youth periods with Club Arzeno and Atletico Pueyrredón, prior to joining San Lorenzo in 2005. His senior career got underway with Argentine Primera División side San Lorenzo in 2016. He made his first-team debut on 17 November 2016 during a Copa Argentina defeat to Gimnasia y Esgrima, which was followed by his first Primera División appearance on 25 March 2017 against Quilmes. Overall, Rojas made eighteen appearances in his first campaign with San Lorenzo. In July 2019, Rojas departed on loan to Uruguay with Peñarol. After debuting in a win over Danubio, he appeared twenty-three times in twelve months there. On April 9, 2021, Rojas scored a spectacular overhead kick from the edge of the 18 yard box in the 75th minute against Platense to put San Lorenzo 3–2 up. Many journalists stated that it could well be the next FIFA Puskás Award winning goal.

== International career ==
Rojas represented Argentina at U20 at the 2016 COTIF Tournament in Spain. He won three caps, versus Qatar, Venezuela and Spain respectively.

== Career statistics ==
=== Club ===
As of 30 August 2020

Appearances and goals by club, season and competition
Club	Season	League			National cup		League cup		Continental		Other		Total	
Club	Season	Division	Apps	Goals	Apps	Goals	Apps	Goals	Apps	Goals	Apps	Goals	Apps	Goals
San Lorenzo	2016–17	Argentine Primera División	13	0	1	0	—		4 (Note: Appearances in Copa Libertadores)	0	0	0	18	0
San Lorenzo	2017–18	Argentine Primera División	17	0	2	0	—		6 (Note: Appearances in Copa Libertadores and Copa Sudamericana)	0	0	0	25	0
San Lorenzo	2018–19	Argentine Primera División	11	0	2	0	0	0	3 (Note: Appearances in Copa Sudamericana)	0	0	0	16	0
San Lorenzo	2019–20	Argentine Primera División	0	0	0	0	0	0	—		0	0	0	0
San Lorenzo	Total		41	0	5	0	0	0	13	0	0	0	59	0
Peñarol (loan)	2019	Uruguayan Primera División	19	0	—		—		0	0	0	0	19	0
Peñarol (loan)	2020	Uruguayan Primera División	2	0	—		—		2	0	0	0	4	0
Peñarol (loan)	Total		21	0	—		—		2	0	0	0	23	0
Career total			62	0	5	0	0	0	15	0	0	0	82	0

== Honours ==
Racing

- Copa Sudamericana: 2024
- Recopa Sudamericana: 2025
