= Facundo Mura =

Argentine footballer (born 1999)

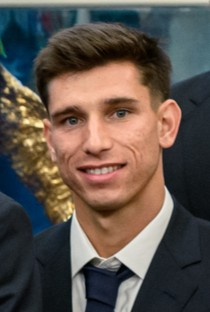
- Mura at the White House in 2026

Personal information
- Full name: Facundo Mura
- Date of birth: 23 March 1999 (age 27)
- Place of birth: General Roca, Argentina
- Height: 1.70 m (5 ft 7 in)
- Position: Right-back

Team information
- Current team: Inter Miami
- Number: 4

Youth career
- Argentinos del Norte
- Deportivo Roca
- 2013–2019: Estudiantes

Senior career*
Years	Team	Apps	(Gls)
2019–2022	Estudiantes	17	(1)
2021	→ Colón (loan)	29	(0)
2022–2025	Racing Club	110	(10)
2026–	Inter Miami	3	(0)

International career
2018–2019	Argentina U20	12	(0)
- * Club domestic league appearances and goals as of 17:45, 17 March 2026 (UTC)

Facundo Mura (born 23 March 1999) is an Argentine professional footballer who plays as a right-back for Major League Soccer club Inter Miami.

== Club career ==
Mura started his career with Estudiantes, signing in 2013 following stints with Argentinos del Norte and Deportivo Roca. He was promoted to the senior set-up in March 2019 under caretaker manager Pablo Quatrocchi, who selected him to start a La Plata derby fixture in the Primera División against Gimnasia y Esgrima on 10 March; the defender played sixty-nine minutes, prior to being substituted off for Juan Ignacio Díaz. On 13 February 2021, Mura joined Colon on a loan until the end of the year with a purchase option. In the final of the 2021 league cup, he gives the assist to Aliendro for the first goal in a 3–0 win over Racing that gives Colón its first first-division title

On 13 January 2022, Mura was sold to Racing Club, with the player signing a deal until the end of 2025.

== International career ==
In January 2019, Mura represented Argentina at the South American U-20 Championship in Chile. He won caps against Paraguay, Ecuador, Colombia and Brazil as his nation finished as runners-up. In the previous year, Mura was called up for the L'Alcúdia International Tournament; featuring five times as they won the trophy. He also had experience of training with the seniors, as well as being on the pre-tournament squad ahead of the 2018 South American Games. Mura was selected for the 2019 FIFA U-20 World Cup by Fernando Batista. In the succeeding September, Mura made Batista's U23 squad for a friendly with Bolivia.

== Personal life ==
Mura's brother, Joaquín, is a fellow footballer; who also began his career in the academy of Estudiantes.

== Career statistics ==
As of 4 September 2019.

Appearances and goals by club, season and competition
Club	Season	League			Cup		League Cup		Continental		Other		Total	
Club	Season	Division	Apps	Goals	Apps	Goals	Apps	Goals	Apps	Goals	Apps	Goals	Apps	Goals
Estudiantes	2018–19	Primera División	3	0	0	0	4	0	—		0	0	7	0
Estudiantes	2019–20	Primera División	3	0	0	0	0	0	—		0	0	3	0
Career total			6	0	0	0	4	0	—		0	0	10	0

== Honours ==
Racing Club

- Trofeo de Campeones de la Liga Profesional: 2022
- Copa Sudamericana: 2024
- Recopa Sudamericana: 2025

Inter Miami

- Campeones Cup: 2026

Argentina U23

- Pre-Olympic Tournament: 2020
