= Gastón Martirena =

Uruguayan footballer (born 2000)

Personal information
- Full name: Gastón Nicolás Martirena Torres
- Date of birth: 5 January 2000 (age 26)
- Place of birth: Montevideo, Uruguay
- Height: 1.73 m (5 ft 8 in)
- Position: Right-back

Team information
- Current team: Nacional (on loan from Racing Club)
- Number: 15

Youth career
- Liverpool Montevideo

Senior career*
Years	Team	Apps	(Gls)
2021–2023	Liverpool Montevideo	79	(8)
2023–	Racing Club	72	(7)
2026–	→ Nacional (loan)	14	(2)
- * Club domestic league appearances and goals as of 01:53, 10 November 2026 (UTC)

Gastón Nicolás Martirena Torres (born 5 January 2000) is a Uruguayan professional footballer who plays as a right-back for Nacional, on loan from Argentine Primera División club Racing Club.

He began his career with Liverpool Montevideo, winning an Apertura and a Clausura title in the Uruguayan Primera División, as well as the Supercopa Uruguaya in 2023. He then transferred to Racing Club, where he won the Copa Sudamericana in 2024 and scored in the final, as well as the 2025 Recopa Sudamericana.

== Career ==
=== Liverpool Montevideo ===
Born in Montevideo, Martirena began his career at Liverpool Montevideo. He made his debut on 24 March 2021 as a late substitute for Jean Rosso in a 4–1 home win over Montevideo City Torque in the Uruguayan Primera División. On 1 August 2021 he scored his first goal in a 3–0 win away to the same team; he netted twice on 16 June 2023 in a 3–1 win away to Cerro Largo. He played in the 2023 Supercopa Uruguaya, in which his team defeated Nacional; he took the free kick from which Gonzalo Nápoli scored the only goal.

=== Racing Club ===
In July 2023, Martirena transferred to Racing Club of the Argentine Primera División as their third signing of the transfer window. The club managed by Fernando Gago paid US$2.6 million for 70% of his economic rights. He made his debut on 4 August as a substitute in a 4–2 loss away to Atlético Nacional of Colombia in the last 16 of the Copa Libertadores, while his league bow came two weeks later as a starter in the 1–1 draw with Unión in the opening game, assisting the goal by Baltasar Rodríguez. On 20 September he scored his only goal of the season, the 2–1 winner at home to Newell's Old Boys in the seventh minute of added time.

In August 2024, Brazilian club Flamengo bid US$5 million for Martirena. The deal was not concluded as Racing demanded a higher amount of the fee to be paid instantly, and the club from Rio de Janeiro wanted 90% of his economic rights, which would have required negotiations with Liverpool.

Martirena scored his first continental goal on 26 September 2024, concluding a 4–1 home win over Athletico Paranaense in the quarter-finals of the Copa Sudamericana. He was on target again in the next game of the competition, ensuring a 2–2 draw away to Corinthians in Brazil. In the final on 23 November against Cruzeiro of Brazil, he scored from a cross for the opening goal of a 3–1 win, giving the club from Avellaneda their first continental honour since the 1988 Supercopa Libertadores. In February, he and the team won the 2025 Recopa Sudamericana 4–0 on aggregate over Brazil's Botafogo.

On 25 August 2026, Martirena returned to his country's top flight, on loan to Nacional, for a fee of US$300,000. He said that he was a fan of the club and had turned down a move to Brazilian club Santos, who had tried to convince him through a telephone call by Neymar.

== Honours ==
Liverpool Montevideo

- Uruguayan Primera División: 2023
- Supercopa Uruguaya: 2023

Racing Club

- Copa Sudamericana: 2024
- Recopa Sudamericana: 2025

Individual

- South America Team of the Year: 2024
