= Nazareno Colombo =

Argentine footballer

Personal information
- Full name: Nazareno Fernández Colombo
- Date of birth: 20 March 1999 (age 27)
- Place of birth: Quilmes, Argentina
- Height: 1.82 m (6 ft 0 in)
- Position: Centre-back

Team information
- Current team: Racing Club
- Number: 23

Youth career
- 2010–2019: Estudiantes

Senior career*
Years	Team	Apps	(Gls)
2019–2022	Estudiantes	24	(2)
2021	→ Defensa y Justicia (loan)	16	(2)
2022–2023	Defensa y Justicia	57	(3)
2023–	Racing Club	78	(3)

International career
2018	Argentina U20	5	(2)
- * Club domestic league appearances and goals as of 18:12, 8 November 2026 (UTC)

Nazareno Fernández Colombo (born 20 March 1999) is an Argentine professional footballer who plays as a centre-back for Racing Club.

== Club career ==
Colombo came through the youth system of Estudiantes, initially joining in 2010. After penning his first professional contract on 11 July 2019, the centre-back made his first-team debut nine days later in a Copa Argentina victory in Cutral Có over Mitre; appearing for the full duration versus the Primera B Nacional outfit.

== International career ==
In 2018, Colombo represented Argentina at the L'Alcúdia International Tournament in Spain. He made five appearances as they won the trophy. In the months prior, Colombo had trained against the seniors at the 2018 FIFA World Cup in Russia. In January 2020 he was called up to the U23 national team of Argentina to take part in the 2020 CONMEBOL Pre-Olympic Tournament in Colombia, replacing Lautaro Valenti. He started the last group stage's match against Venezuela and netted a goal.

In late August 2021, Colombo joined Defensa y Justicia on a dry loan the rest of the year. On 17 January 2022, Defensa bought Colombo free from Estudiantes for a fee around 1,250,000 dollars for 50% of his pass, with the player signing a deal until the end of 2025.

== Personal life ==
Colombo is the son of former professional footballer Leonardo Colombo.

== Career statistics ==
As of 22 July 2019.

Appearances and goals by club, season and competition
Club	Season	League			Cup		League Cup		Continental		Other		Total	
Club	Season	Division	Apps	Goals	Apps	Goals	Apps	Goals	Apps	Goals	Apps	Goals	Apps	Goals
Estudiantes	2019–20	Primera División	0	0	1	0	0	0	—		0	0	1	0
Career total			0	0	1	0	0	0	—		0	0	1	0

== Honours ==
Racing Club

- Copa Sudamericana: 2024
- Recopa Sudamericana: 2025

Argentina U20

- L'Alcúdia International Tournament: 2018

Argentina U23

- Pre-Olympic Tournament: 2020
