= Marco Di Cesare =

Argentine footballer

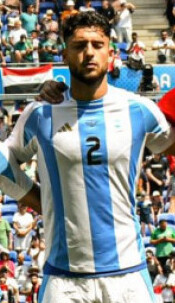

Personal information
- Full name: Marco Genaro Di Cesare
- Date of birth: 30 January 2002 (age 24)
- Place of birth: Mendoza, Argentina
- Height: 1.86 m (6 ft 1 in)
- Positions: Centre-back; central midfielder

Team information
- Current team: Racing Club
- Number: 3

Youth career
- Andes Talleres
- 2018–2020: Argentinos Juniors

Senior career*
Years	Team	Apps	(Gls)
2020–2024	Argentinos Juniors	48	(1)
2024–	Racing Club	61	(3)
- * Club domestic league appearances and goals as of 18:01, 8 November 2026 (UTC)

Marco Genaro Di Cesare (born 30 January 2002) is an Argentine professional footballer who plays as a centre-back or central midfielder for Racing Club.

== Career ==
Di Cesare joined Argentinos Juniors in 2018 from Andes Talleres. He made the breakthrough into their first-team squad under manager Diego Dabove in 2020, as he signed his first professional contract in August; penning terms until December 2024. Di Cesare's senior debut arrived on 22 November in a Copa de la Liga Profesional defeat away to San Lorenzo, with the player replacing Matías Caruzzo with twelve minutes remaining.

Di Cesare competed for Argentina at the 2024 Summer Olympics.

== Personal life ==
Di Cesare holds an Italian passport.

== Honours ==
Racing

- Copa Sudamericana: 2024
- Recopa Sudamericana: 2025
