= Santiago Quirós =

Argentine footballer

Personal information
- Full name: Santiago Alexander Quirós
- Date of birth: 4 March 2003 (age 23)
- Place of birth: Avellaneda, Argentina
- Height: 1.79 m (5 ft 10 in)
- Position: Centre-back

Team information
- Current team: Platense (on loan from Racing Club)
- Number: 32

Youth career
- Boca Juniors
- 2021–2022: Racing Club

Senior career*
| Years | Team | Apps | (Gls) |
| 2022– | Racing Club | 41 | (1) |
| 2026– | → Platense (loan) | 2 | (0) |
- * Club domestic league appearances and goals as of 17:18, 22 November 2026 (UTC) ‡ National team caps and goals as of 17:42, 24 November 2024 (UTC)

Santiago Alexander Quirós (born 4 March 2003) is an Argentine professional footballer who plays as a centre-back for the Argentine Primera División club Platense, on loan from Racing Club.

== Club career ==
A youth product of Boca Juniors, Quirós moved to the youth academy of Racing Club in 2021 and signed his first professional contract with the club on 31 December 2022 until 2026. He made his senior and professional debut with Racing Club in a 3–1 Copa Argentina win over General San Martín on 22 February 2023. He was on the matchday squad that won the 2024 Copa Sudamericana fina, a 3–1 win over Cruzeiro on 23 November 2024.

== Honours ==
Racing Club

- Supercopa Internacional: 2022
- Copa Sudamericana: 2024
- Recopa Sudamericana: 2025
