= Ignacio Rodríguez (footballer, born 2002) =

Argentine footballer (born 2002)

Personal information
- Full name: Ignacio Agustín Rodríguez
- Date of birth: 22 February 2002 (age 24)
- Place of birth: Guernica, Buenos Aires, Argentina
- Height: 1.78 m (5 ft 10 in)
- Position: Midfielder

Team information
- Current team: Racing Club
- Number: 19

Youth career
- Deportivo Glew
- Villa Numancia
- Banfield

Senior career*
Years	Team	Apps	(Gls)
2021–2025	Banfield	79	(5)
2025–	Racing Club	38	(2)
- * Club domestic league appearances and goals as of 18:08, 8 November 2026 (UTC)

Ignacio Agustín Rodríguez (born 22 February 2002) is an Argentine professional footballer who plays as a midfielder for Racing Club.

== Career ==
Rodríguez came through the youth system at Banfield after joining at the under-15 level and made his debut on 6 April 2021 in a 2–2 draw against Estudiantes. He scored his first goal on 25 September 2023, equalising in a 1–1 draw against River Plate. In September 2024, he signed a new contract until the end of 2026.

In January 2025, Rodríguez signed for fellow Liga Profesional de Fútbol side Racing Club, who acquired 50% of his economic rights for $1.2 million. He signed a contract until the end of 2028. He made his Racing debut on 24 January 2025 in a 3–1 win against Barracas Central, being substituted after suffering a cut to the face. On 21 February, he appeared in the first leg of Racing's 4–0 Recopa Sudamericana victory over Botafogo, coming on as an 89th-minute substitute.

== Career statistics ==
As of 15 January 2026

Appearances and goals by club, season and competition
Club	Season	League			Cup (Note: Includes Copa Argentina)		Continental		Other		Total	
Club	Season	Division	Goals	Apps	Apps	Goals	Apps	Goals	Apps	Goals	Apps	Goals
Banfield	2019–20	AFA Liga Profesional de Fútbol	0	0	0	0	—		1 (Note: Appearance in Trofeo de Campeones de la Liga Profesional)	0	1	0
Banfield	2021	AFA Liga Profesional de Fútbol	2	0	0	0	—		—		2	0
Banfield	2022	AFA Liga Profesional de Fútbol	5	0	0	0	—		—		5	0
Banfield	2023	AFA Liga Profesional de Fútbol	33	1	0	0	—		—		33	1
Banfield	2024	AFA Liga Profesional de Fútbol	40	4	2	0	—		—		42	4
Banfield	Total		80	5	2	0	0	0	1	0	83	5
Racing Club	2025	AFA Liga Profesional de Fútbol	21	0	2	0	6 (Note: Appearances in Copa Libertadores)	0	1 (Note: Appearance in Recopa Sudamericana)	0	30	0
Career total			101	5	4	0	6	0	2	0	130	12

== Honours ==
Racing Club

- Recopa Sudamericana: 2025
