= Facundo Cambeses =

Argentine footballer (born 1997)

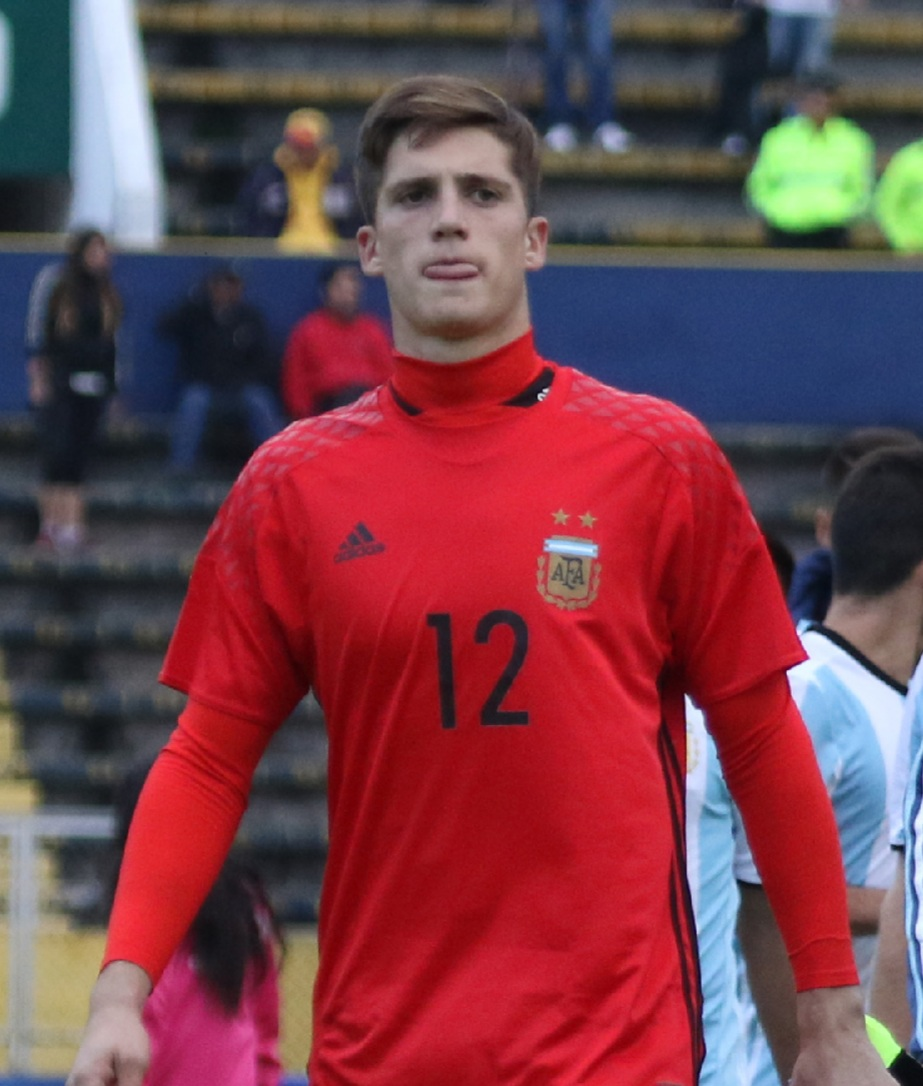
- Cambeses with Argentina U20 in 2017

Personal information
- Full name: Facundo Nicolás Cambeses
- Date of birth: 9 April 1997 (age 29)
- Place of birth: Longchamps, Argentina
- Height: 1.85 m (6 ft 1 in)
- Position: Goalkeeper

Team information
- Current team: Racing Club
- Number: 25

Youth career
- Banfield

Senior career*
| Years | Team | Apps | (Gls) |
| 2016–2024 | Banfield | 74 | (0) |
| 2020–2021 | → Huracán (loan) | 13 | (0) |
| 2024– | Racing Club | 62 | (0) |

International career^{‡}
| 2017 | Argentina U20 | 3 | (0) |
| 2019 | Argentina U23 | 5 | (0) |
| 2025– | Argentina | 1 | (0) |
Medal record
Representing Argentina
Men's Football
Pan American Games
| Gold medal – first place | 2019 Lima | Team competition |
- * Club domestic league appearances and goals as of 18:13, 8 November 2026 (UTC) ‡ National team caps and goals as of 14 October 2025

Facundo Nicolás Cambeses (born 9 April 1997) is an Argentine professional footballer who plays as a goalkeeper for Racing Club and the Argentina national team.

== Club career ==
=== Banfield ===
Cambeses started his career with Banfield. He didn't make his professional bow for the Primera División club until 2019, having been an unused substitute twenty-two times in all competitions across the previous three years. With first-choice Iván Arboleda away on international duty, Cambeses' senior debut arrived under Hernán Crespo on 18 March 2019 during a league fixture with Godoy Cruz at the Estadio Florencio Sola.

==== Loan to Huracán ====
In August 2020, Cambeses was loaned to Huracán. Cambeses suffered a broken hand during a training session in February 2021. Cambeses was recalled from his loan early by Banfield on 9 July 2021.

== International career ==
Cambeses represented Argentina at the 2017 South American U-20 Championship, winning three caps as they finished fourth in Ecuador. In 2016, he participated in the L'Alcúdia International Tournament in Spain. Three years after, Cambeses made the U23s' squad for the 2019 Pan American Games in Peru. He appeared in all five of their matches, including in the final versus Honduras, as Argentina won the trophy.

== Career statistics ==
=== Club ===
As of 8 December 2024

Appearances and goals by club, season and competition
| Club | Season | League | | | National cup | | League cup | | Continental | | Other | | Total | |
| Club | Season | Division | Apps | Goals | Apps | Goals | Apps | Goals | Apps | Goals | Apps | Goals | Apps | Goals |
|---|---|---|---|---|---|---|---|---|---|---|---|---|---|---|
| Banfield | 2016 | Argentine Primera División | 0 | 0 | 0 | 0 | — | | — | | — | | 0 | 0 |
| Banfield | 2016–17 | Argentine Primera División | 0 | 0 | 0 | 0 | — | | 0 | 0 | — | | 0 | 0 |
| Banfield | 2017–18 | Argentine Primera División | 0 | 0 | 0 | 0 | — | | 0 | 0 | — | | 0 | 0 |
| Banfield | 2018–19 | Argentine Primera División | 3 | 0 | 0 | 0 | 2 | 0 | 0 | 0 | — | | 5 | 0 |
| Banfield | 2019–20 | Argentine Primera División | 0 | 0 | 0 | 0 | 0 | 0 | — | | — | | 0 | 0 |
| Banfield | 2021 | Argentine Primera División | 8 | 0 | 0 | 0 | — | | — | | — | | 8 | 0 |
| Banfield | 2022 | Argentine Primera División | 21 | 0 | 4 | 0 | — | | 0 | 0 | — | | 25 | 0 |
| Banfield | 2023 | Argentine Primera División | 42 | 0 | 2 | 0 | — | | — | | — | | 44 | 0 |
| Banfield | Total | | 74 | 0 | 6 | 0 | 2 | 0 | 0 | 0 | — | | 82 | 0 |
| Huracán (loan) | 2020–21 | Argentine Primera División | 11 | 0 | — | | — | | — | | — | | 11 | 0 |
| Huracán (loan) | 2021 | Argentine Primera División | 2 | 0 | 1 | 0 | — | | — | | — | | 3 | 0 |
| Huracán (loan) | Total | | 13 | 0 | 1 | 0 | — | | — | | — | | 14 | 0 |
| Racing Club | 2024 | Argentine Primera División | 8 | 0 | 2 | 0 | — | | 0 | 0 | — | | 10 | 0 |
| Career total | | | 95 | 0 | 9 | 0 | 2 | 0 | 0 | 0 | 0 | 0 | 106 | 0 |

== Honours ==
=== Club ===
Racing Club

- Copa Sudamericana: 2024
- Recopa Sudamericana: 2025

=== International ===
Argentina Olympic

- Pan American Games: 2019
- Pre-Olympic Tournament: 2020
