= Estadio General Pablo Rojas =

Stadium in Asunción, Paraguay

- La Olla, Olla Azulgrana, La Nueva Olla (Since 2017)
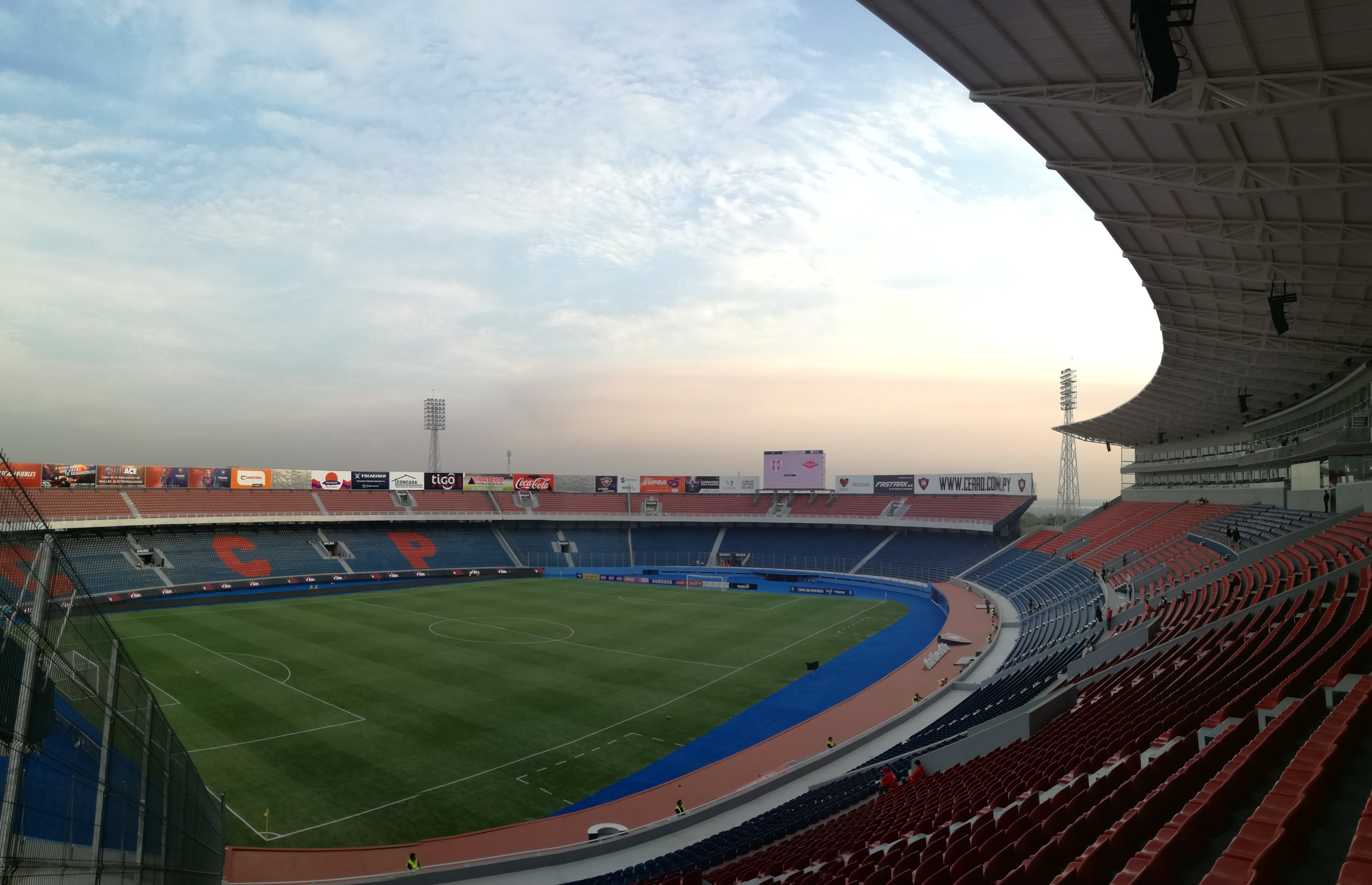
- Interactive map of Estadio General Pablo Rojas
- Full name: Estadio General Pablo Rojas
- Former names: Estadio Adriano Irala
- Location: Asunción, Paraguay
- Coordinates: 25°18′00″S 57°38′15″W
- Owner: Cerro Porteño
- Capacity: 43,050
- Surface: Grass
- Field size: 105 × 70 m

Construction
- Opened: 24 May 1970; 56 years ago
- Renovated: 1980, 1999, 2009, 2015-2017
- Expanded: 2015–2017

Tenants
- Cerro Porteño (1970–present); Paraguay national football team (selected matches)

Estadio General Pablo Rojas, locally known as La Olla or La Nueva Olla and for sponsorship reasons known as Estadio ueno La Nueva Olla, is a football stadium in the neighbourhood of Barrio Obrero in Asunción, Paraguay. It is the home of Cerro Porteño. The stadium's nickname, La Olla, meaning The Pot in English, was given by the club's former president, General Pablo Rojas, after whom the stadium was named following his death. The stadium was used during the 1999 Copa América, hosting a Group C fixture between Uruguay and Colombia. The stadium seats slightly over 45,000 spectators and has balconies, car parking, food courts and canteens in all sectors.

== History ==
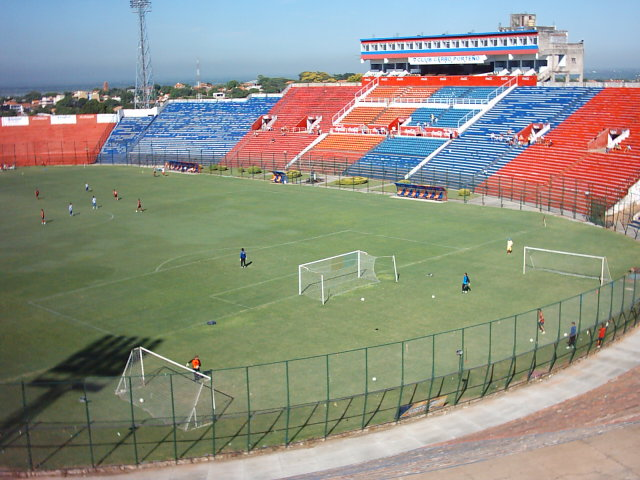
Estadio General Pablo Rojas prior to the renovation and expansion

The stadium hosted its first game on 24 May 1970, a 2-1 victory for Porteño over Club Silvio Pettirossi. It underwent renovations in 1980, 2009 and between 2015 and 2017. For many years after its opening, the stadium, the south-eastern part remained unfinished. This was due to a house blocking its construction, whose owners refused to sell it. That was until 38 years later, in 2009, allowing the stadium to be fully completed.

=== 2015–2017 renovation ===
The renovation design between 2015 and 2017 was creazted by Alfredo Angulo in order to increase the stadiums capacity from 37,000 to 45,000 people. During the 2015 reconstruction, the playing field was significantly lowered, which enabled the first ever field-level private boxes in Paraguay. Its grandstand was demolished to add a 5,000-seat upper tier to the north stand and a smaller upper tier was created above the east and south stands. Its main grandstand gained floor space and dozens of skyboxes, which played crucial role in the financing of the entire scheme. The stadium was smoothened significantly and remained asymmetric. Members of the club's barra brava worked for 18-months on the stadium's construction to help create a stronger bond between the fans and the stadium.

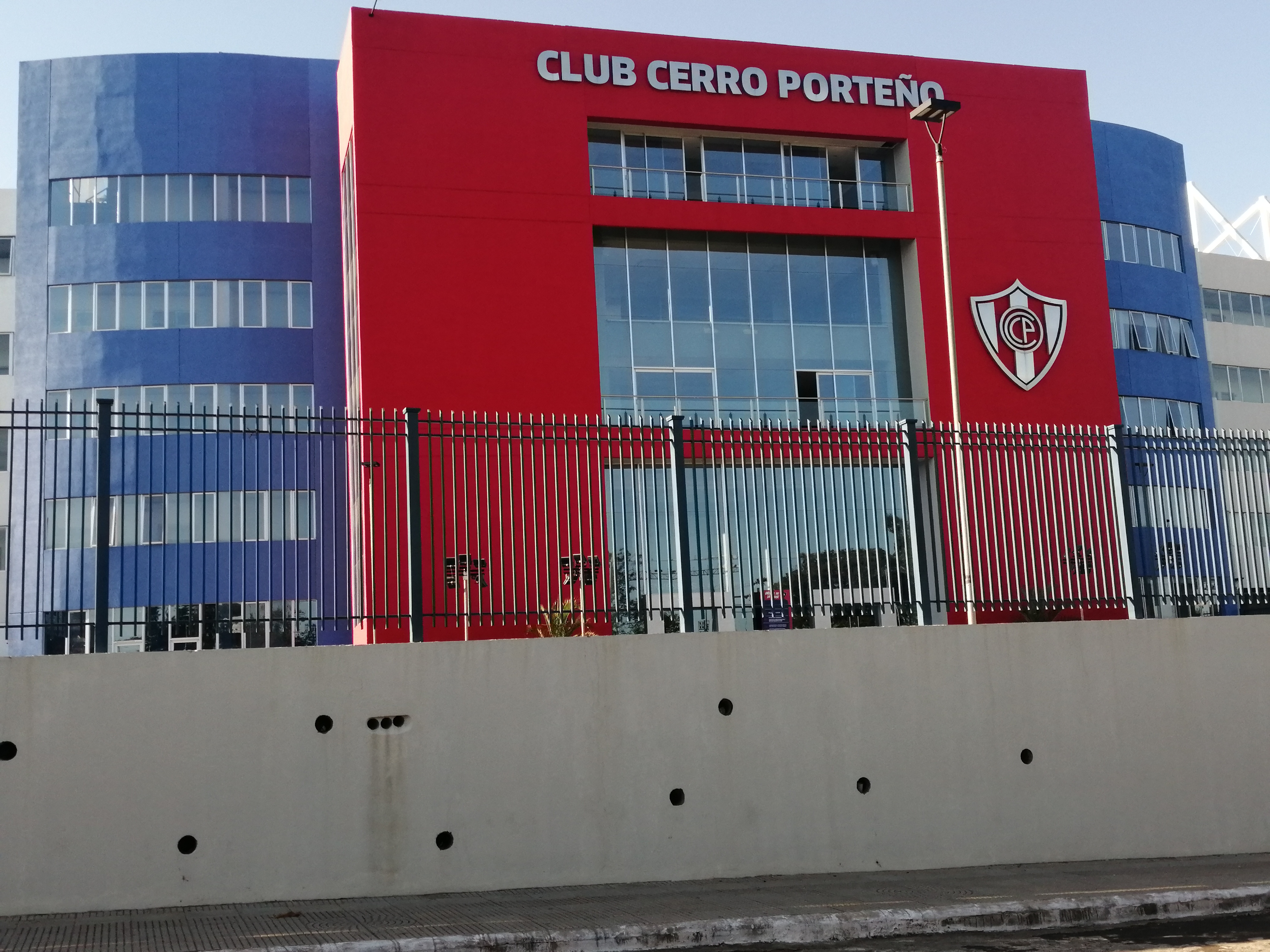
Exterior view of the General Pablo Rojas Stadium in 2020

The renovated stadium was reinaugurated on 19 August 2017 with a ceremony that CONMEBOL president Alejandro Domínguez attended. Following the ceremony, a friendly match was played between Cerro Porteño and Argentine club Boca Juniors. Boca won the match 2–1.

== Concerts ==
Country	Artist	Date	Tour
(Puerto Rico)	Daddy Yankee	March 16, 2019	Con Calma Tour
(United States)	Black Eyed Peas	October 10, 2019	The Masters of the Sun
(Mexico)	Marco Antonio Solís	October 22, 2022	Qué ganas de verte!
(Puerto Rico)	Bad Bunny	November 11, 2022	World's Hottest Tour
(Mexico)	Maná	February 16, 2024	México lindo y querido Tour
(Mexico)	Luis Miguel	March 20, 2024	Luis Miguel Tour 2023–24
(Colombia)	Karol G	May 2, 2024	Mañana Será Bonito Tour
(Colombia)	Shakira	November 28, 2025	Las Mujeres Ya No Lloran World Tour
(Colombia)	Shakira	November 29, 2025	Las Mujeres Ya No Lloran World Tour
(England)	Ed Sheeran	November 26, 2026	Loop Tour

== See also ==
- List of association football stadia by capacity

Preceded by Two-legged Final	Copa Sudamericana; Final Venue; 2019	Succeeded by Estadio Mario Alberto Kempes; Córdoba, Argentina
Preceded by Estadio Domingo Burgueño; Maldonado	Copa Sudamericana; Final Venue; 2024	Succeeded by Estadio Ramón Tahuichi Aguilera; Santa Cruz
