= Adrián Martínez (footballer, born July 1992) =

Argentine footballer (born 1992)

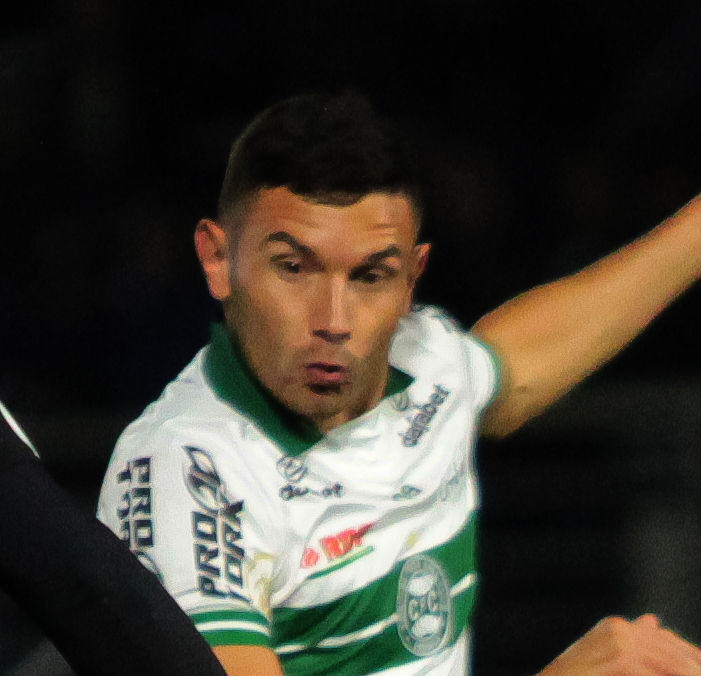
- Martínez with Coritiba in 2022

Personal information
- Full name: Adrián Emmanuel Martínez
- Date of birth: 2 July 1992 (age 34)
- Place of birth: Campana, Argentina
- Height: 1.80 m (5 ft 11 in)
- Position: Forward

Team information
- Current team: Racing Club
- Number: 9

Youth career
- 2009–2010: Villa Dálmine

Senior career*
Years	Team	Apps	(Gls)
2015–2017	Defensores Unidos	73	(34)
2017–2018	Atlanta	31	(12)
2018	Sol de América	17	(12)
2019–2023	Libertad	49	(12)
2021	→ Cerro Porteño (loan)	7	(0)
2022	→ Coritiba (loan)	22	(4)
2023–2024	Instituto	39	(16)
2024–	Racing	89	(38)
- * Club domestic league appearances and goals as of 18:04, 8 November 2026 (UTC)

Adrián Emmanuel Martínez (born 2 July 1992), better known as Maravilla Martínez, is an Argentine professional footballer who plays as a forward for Argentine Primera División club Racing.

== Club career ==
=== Early career ===
Born in Campana, Buenos Aires Province, Martínez never represented any clubs during his youth setup (except from a year at Villa Dálmine at the age of 17). He played for hometown amateurs Club Las Acacias (which was presided by his mother) while working as a waste collector and bricklayer; at the former job, he was dismissed from his company after suffering a motorcycle accident.

In 2014, after his brother was shot, Martínez was arrested after being accused of burning and robbing the aggressor's home. He spent six months in jail until he could prove his innocence. After leaving prison, he returned to his first club Las Acacias before trialling at Primera C Metropolitana side Defensores Unidos in January 2015, subsequently joining the club but initially playing without receiving wages.

In 2017, after scoring 21 goals for Defensores, Martínez joined Primera B Metropolitana side Atlanta. He scored 15 goals during his only season at the club, netting against Primera División side Belgrano and River Plate in the Copa Argentina.

On 18 June 2018, Martínez moved abroad and joined Paraguayan Primera División club Sol de América. He was the club's top goalscorer with 12 goals, notably scoring braces against Olimpia (twice) and 3 de Febrero.

=== Libertad ===
On 18 December 2018, Martínez signed for Libertad. The following 13 February, he scored a hat-trick in a 5–1 Copa Libertadores home rout of The Strongest.

==== Cerro Porteño (loan) ====
On 1 July 2021, it was informed that Martinez would be loaned by Libertad to Cerro Porteño for the second half of the year. The loan deal was announced for one year.

==== Instituto ====
Martínez was transferred to Instituto de Córdoba for the 2023 season after five years outside Argentina. The 16 goals he scored in 39 league matches allowed Instituto to retain their spot in the Primera División for their return to Argentina's top level after 17 seasons.

==== Racing ====
Martínez signed a 3-year contract for Racing in December 2023. Martinez had an instant impact at the club; he scored a hat trick in only his 4th match with the club, during a 4–1 victory against San Lorenzo on 10 February 2024. In the next matchday, he scored a brace in a 4–0 victory against Newell's Old Boys. On 24 February, he scored the only goal of the match to give Racing the victory in the Avellaneda derby at Estadio Libertadores de América. On 30 March, he scored a hat trick in a 3–1 victory away to Central Córdoba.

Martinez made his Copa Sudamericana debut on 4 April, scoring in a 2–0 victory against Sportivo Luqueño. In the next matchday against Red Bull Bragantino, he assisted Maximiliano Salas and then scored a goal in a 3–0 victory. He added four more goals in the group stage; a penalty away to Coquimbo Unido on 24 April, a brace scored against the same team in a 3–0 home victory on 16 May, and a goal against Sportivo Luqueño on 29 May.

His goal scoring continued into the knockout stages; he scored in both legs against Chile's Huachipato as Racing advanced to the quarter-finals 8–1 on aggregate. On 27 September in the second leg of the quarter-finals, he scored in a 4–1 victory, helping his team advance to the semi-finals 4–2 on aggregate after having lost the first leg in Brazil 1–0. In the semi-finals second leg against Corinthians, he assisted Juan Quintero's winning goal to send the team into the final.

On 23 November, in the final against Cruzeiro, he scored a goal as his team lifted its first ever Copa Sudamericana. He was the top scorer of the competition, scoring 10 goals, and was named in the tournament's best XI.

On 15 July 2025, Martinez signed a contract extension with Racing until 2028. The deal included a release clause of € 122m, a record in Argentinean football.

== Honours ==
Racing Club

- Copa Sudamericana: 2024
- Recopa Sudamericana: 2025

Individual

- Copa Sudamericana Top scorer: 2024
- Copa Libertadores Top scorer: 2025
