= Martín Barrios =

Uruguayan footballer (born 1999)

Personal information
- Full name: Martín Barrios Do Santos
- Date of birth: 24 January 1999 (age 27)
- Place of birth: Montevideo, Uruguay
- Height: 1.77 m (5 ft 10 in)
- Position: Midfielder

Team information
- Current team: Platense (on loan from Racing Club)
- Number: 24

Youth career
- Racing Montevideo

Senior career*
Years	Team	Apps	(Gls)
2018–2023	Racing Montevideo	82	(6)
2022	→ Albion (loan)	31	(1)
2023–2024	Liverpool	55	(2)
2024–	Racing Club	30	(1)
2026–	→ Platense (loan)	20	(0)

International career^{‡}
2018–2019	Uruguay U20	21	(2)
2019	Uruguay U22	4	(0)
- * Club domestic league appearances and goals as of 17:15, 22 November 2026 (UTC) ‡ National team caps and goals as of 11 August 2019

Martín Barrios Do Santos (born 24 January 1999) is a Uruguayan footballer who plays as a midfielder for Argentine Primera División club Platense, on loan from Racing Club.

== International career ==
As a youth international, Barrios has represented Uruguay at the 2019 South American U-20 Championship, 2019 FIFA U-20 World Cup and the 2019 Pan American Games.

== Honours ==
Racing

- Copa Sudamericana: 2024
