= Santiago Solari (footballer, born 1998) =

Argentine footballer

Personal information
- Full name: Santiago Germán Solari Ferreyra
- Date of birth: 19 January 1998 (age 28)
- Place of birth: Arizona, Argentina
- Height: 1.78 m (5 ft 10 in)
- Position: Winger

Team information
- Current team: Newell's Old Boys (on loan from Racing Club)
- Number: 32

Youth career
- 2011–2019: Vélez Sarsfield

Senior career*
Years	Team	Apps	(Gls)
2019	Club Victoria	9	(4)
2019–2023	Juventud Unida Universitario	15	(3)
2021	→ Atlanta (loan)	26	(1)
2022	→ Gimnasia y Esgrima (loan)	37	(8)
2023–2024	Defensa y Justicia	37	(5)
2024–	Racing Club	79	(10)
2026–	→ Newell's Old Boys (loan)	1	(0)
- * Club domestic league appearances and goals as of 16:25, 8 September 2026 (UTC) ‡ National team caps and goals as of 17:42, 24 November 2024 (UTC)

Santiago Germán Solari Ferreyra (born 18 January 1998) is an Argentine professional footballer who plays as a winger for the Argentine Primera División club Newell's Old Boys, on loan from Racing Club.

== Club career ==
Solari is a youth product of Vélez Sarsfield, having joined them at the age of 13. He began his senior career with Club Victoria in the Argentine fourth division in 2019, and that same year transferred to Juventud Unida Universitario in the third division. On 15 February 2021, he joined Atlanta on loan in the Primera Nacional. In 2022, he was loaned to Gimnasia y Esgrima in the same division. On 4 March 2023, he transferred to Defensa y Justicia in the Argentine Primera División.

On 3 January 2024, Solari transferred to Racing Club on a contract until 2027. He helped the squad win the 2024 Copa Sudamericana, coming on as a late substitute in the final, a 3–1 win over Cruzeiro on 23 November 2024.

== Personal life ==
Solari is the brother of Pablo Solari, who is also a professional footballer.

== Honours ==
Racing Club

Copa Sudamericana: 2024
