= Racing Club de Avellaneda =

Association football club in Argentina

Coordinates: 34°40′03″S 58°22′07″W

Racing Club
- Full name: Racing Club
- Nicknames: La Academia (The Academy); El Primer Grande (The First 'Big One')
- Short name: Racing
- Founded: 25 March 1903; 123 years ago as Foot Ball Club Barracas al Sur
- Stadium: Estadio Presidente Perón
- Capacity: 55,880
- President: Diego Milito
- Head coach: Sebastián Romero
- League: Liga Profesional
- 2025: 5th of 30
- Website: racingclub.com.ar
Home colours	Away colours	Third colours

Racing Club (Spanish pronunciation: [ˈrasin ˈkluβ]) is a professional sports club based in Avellaneda, Argentina. The institution is best known for its football teams, with its men's team competing in the Primera División, the top tier of the Argentine football league system. Founded in 1903, the club joined the Argentine Football Association two years later. Its senior football teams play home matches at Estadio Presidente Perón, commonly known as El Cilindro, which stands on the site of the club's former Alsina y Colón ground. Historically, Racing is regarded as one of the Big Five of Argentine football.

The club also fields a professional women's team, Racing Club de Avellaneda Femenino, which competes in the Primera División A, the top flight of Argentine women's football.

Though mainly a football club, Racing also hosts other sports such as artistic gymnastics, basketball, beach soccer, boxing, chess, field hockey, futsal, handball, martial arts, roller skating, tennis, and volleyball.

The club has won the Primera División 18 times, including an unmatched streak of seven consecutive titles—five of them unbeaten—between 1913 and 1919, becoming the first club in the world to achieve this and the only one in the Americas. It has also won 15 national cups, holding the record for the most titles in the Copa Ibarguren, Copa de Honor MCBA, Copa Beccar Varela, Copa Británica, and Trofeo de Campeones.

On the international stage, the club has won eight titles—five organised by CONMEBOL and three jointly by the Argentine Football Association and the Uruguayan Football Association. These include the 1967 Copa Libertadores, the 1967 Intercontinental Cup, the 1988 Supercopa Libertadores, the 2024 Copa Sudamericana, and the 2025 Recopa Sudamericana.

In footballing terms, the team is nicknamed La Academia (The Academy) because it was the most successful side during the amateur era, known for a creole style of play that set the standard and taught its rivals how the game should be played. It is also known as El Primer Grande (The First 'Big'), as it was the first of the Big Five to win a league title, a national cup, and an international trophy. Moreover, it was the first Argentine club to win the World Championship (Intercontinental Cup), achieving this historic milestone in 1967.

Its traditional colours are sky blue and white, chosen as a tribute to the flag of Argentina. Its neighbours and main rivals are Independiente, with whom it contests the Avellaneda Derby. Matches against the other three members of the Big Five (Boca Juniors, River Plate, and San Lorenzo) are also regarded as classics. The club currently has 103,422 active club members.

== History ==
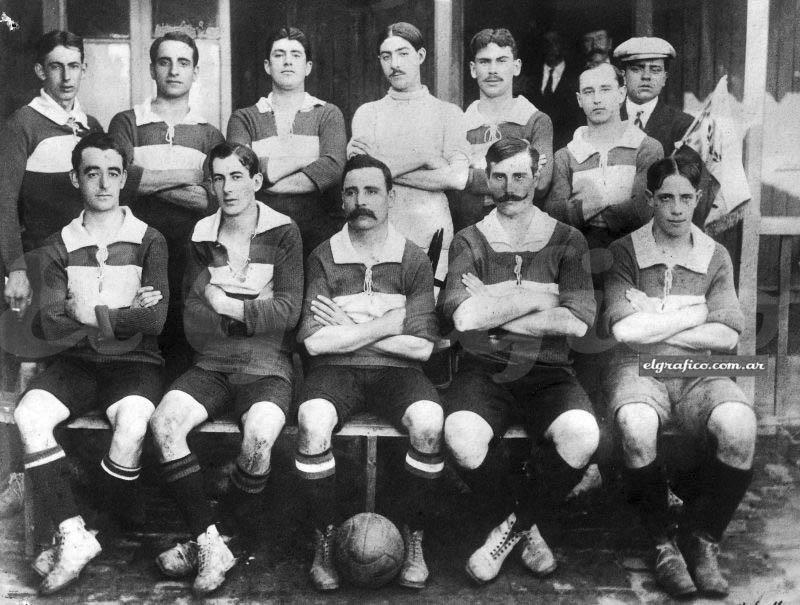
Racing in 1910, when the squad promoted to Primera División

The club was officially established on 25 March 1903 under the name Foot Ball Racing Club was officially founded.

Racing affiliated to Argentine Football Association (AFA) in 1905 and began to compete in the lower division championships organised by the body. After a failed attempt to promote to Primera División at hands of River Plate, Racing finally promoted in 1910 after defeating Boca Juniors in the final.

The 1910s was a golden age for Racing so the team won a seven consecutive league titles (a record that remains unmatched to present days) between 1913 Argentine Primera División and 1919. Besides, Racing won nine national cups and two Rioplatense cups to totalise 18 titles won within the decade.

That huge success earned the club the nickname "Academia" (Academy of football), known for a creole style of play that set the standard and taught its rivals how the game should be played.

== Identity and symbols ==
Racing's light blue and white colours are reflected in the club crest, which has evolved since the institution's early years. According to the club, its first symbolic mark appeared in the first book of minutes in 1903, as a laurel-framed seal containing a football and the inscription "Foot Ball Racing Club - Barracas al Sud". A similar official seal was documented in 1912, while the first crest recognised by the club as official appeared around 1929. The club statute describes as a vertical rectangular shield with a sky-blue upper field bearing the word "Racing" and seven alternating sky-blue and white vertical stripes below.

== Stadium ==
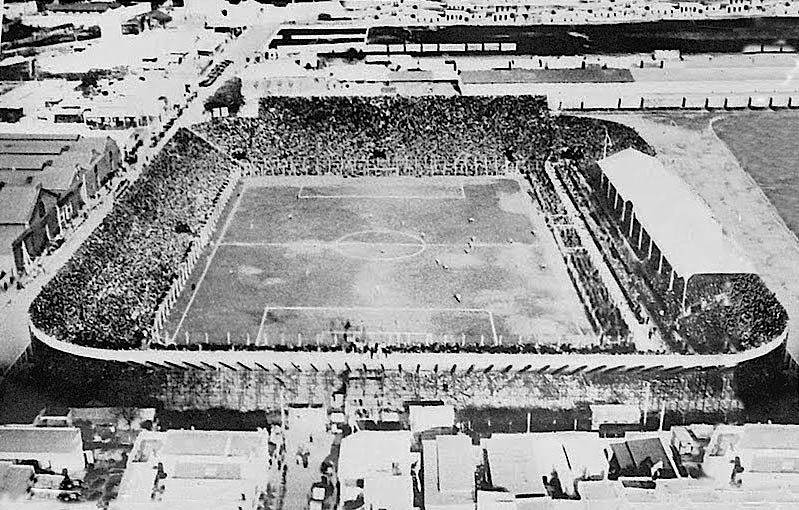
Aerial view of Alsina y Colón in 1939.

Racing's stadium history reflects its growth and challenges over time. Around the early 1900s, the club relocated to a new pitch on Miguel O'Gorman Street (now 25 de Mayo). This ground featured a modest wooden structure affectionately known as La Caseta Multifunción (The Multipurpose Booth), which served various practical roles during the club's early years.

However, due to frequent flooding at this location, Racing returned in 1906 to its previous grounds at Alsina y Colón. Following the 1946 season, when the government of Juan Perón, through Finance Minister Ramón Cereijo, granted a loan to build a more modern venue, the team left this stadium.

In 1950, Racing inaugurated its current home, Estadio Presidente Perón (President Perón Stadium) and popularly known as El Cilindro (The Cylinder). Today, it stands as the second largest stadium in Argentina, behind only River Plate's Monumental.

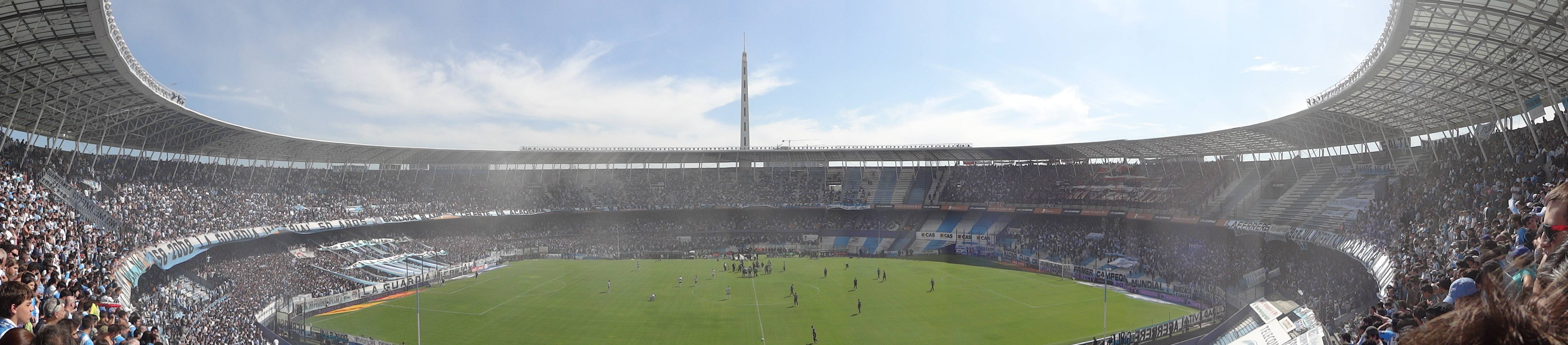
Panoramic view of the Racing Club stadium, August 2019

=== Other facilities ===
Beyond Estadio Presidente Perón, Racing Club operates several facilities connected to its sporting, educational, and institutional activities. These include Sede Avellaneda, Sede Capital, Predio Tita Mattiussi, Casa Tita Mattiussi, Colegio Racing Club, Polideportivo Avellaneda, and Predio Ezeiza.

The Predio Tita Mattiussi, located in Avellaneda, is used as the training base for the club's football youth divisions, as well as for youth home matches and player trials.

== Other sports ==
Although football is Racing Club's most prominent activity, the institution also organises a wide range of sports at its Avellaneda and Villa del Parque facilities. These include basketball, futsal, field hockey, handball, tennis, boxing, athletics, artistic skating, gymnastics, volleyball, judo, taekwondo, fencing, and other disciplines.

== Kit manufacturers and sponsors ==
In 2026, Nike became Racing Club's technical sponsor under a three-year agreement, with the club introducing new uniforms as part of the deal. The club lists Betsson as its main sponsor and as one of the official sponsors of its men's football team; other official sponsors of the men's team include American Vial, Cetrogar, PAX and Río Uruguay Seguros.

== Players ==
=== Current squad ===
As of 22 October 2026

Note: Flags indicate national team as defined under FIFA eligibility rules; some limited exceptions apply. Players may hold more than one non-FIFA nationality.

No.	Pos.	Nation	Player
1	GK	ARG	Francisco Gómez
2	DF	ARG	Matías Pérez
3	DF	ARG	Marco Di Césare
4	DF	ARG	Ezequiel Cannavo (on loan from Defensa y Justicia)
5	MF	ARG	Matías Kranevitter
6	DF	ARG	Marcos Rojo
7	FW	COL	Duván Vergara
8	MF	ARG	Alan Forneris
9	FW	ARG	Adrián Martínez
10	MF	USA	Matko Miljević
11	MF	ARG	Matías Zaracho
14	DF	ARG	Juan Barinaga (on loan from Boca Juniors)
16	MF	CHI	Ulises Ortegoza
17	FW	ARG	Tomás Conechny

No.	Pos.	Nation	Player
18	DF	URU	Alfonso Espino
19	DF	ARG	Ignacio Rodríguez
20	MF	ARG	Gastón Lodico
21	FW	ARG	Valentín Carboni (on loan from Inter Milan)
22	FW	ARG	Elías Torres
23	DF	ARG	Nazareno Colombo
24	MF	ARG	Adrián Fernández
25	GK	ARG	Facundo Cambeses
30	GK	ARG	Matías Tagliamonte
32	FW	ARG	Lautaro Díaz (on loan from Cruzeiro)
33	MF	ARG	Leonel Pérez (on loan from Grêmio)
38	DF	ARG	Mateo Martínez
43	DF	ARG	Gonzalo Escudero
46	MF	ARG	Alejandro Tello

=== Reserve squad ===
Note: Flags indicate national team as defined under FIFA eligibility rules; some limited exceptions apply. Players may hold more than one non-FIFA nationality.

No.	Pos.	Nation	Player
12	GK	ARG	Thiago De Bellis
31	DF	ARG	Benjamín González
36	MF	ARG	Bautista Pérez
37	MF	ARG	Santino Aguirre
40	FW	ARG	Francisco Fraga
41	DF	ARG	Samir Meza
42	DF	ARG	Galo Volpe
45	MF	ARG	Ezequiel Pérez

No.	Pos.	Nation	Player
47	MF	ARG	Thiago Taborda
48	MF	ARG	Gonzalo Leiva
49	MF	ARG	Bautista Castreje
50	DF	ARG	Luciano Agüero
57	GK	ARG	Lucio Latorre
59	MF	ARG	Felipe Schaare
62	DF	PER	Axel Cabellos

==== Out on loan ====
Note: Flags indicate national team as defined under FIFA eligibility rules; some limited exceptions apply. Players may hold more than one non-FIFA nationality.

No.	Pos.	Nation	Player
14	MF	ARG	Maico Quiroz (at Güemes until 31 December 2026)
15	DF	URU	Gastón Martirena (at Nacional until 30 June 2027)
16	MF	URU	Martín Barrios (at Platense until 31 December 2026)
19	DF	ARG	Juan Elordi (at Independiente Rivadavia until 31 December 2026)
20	DF	ARG	Germán Conti (at Gimnasia-LP until 30 June 2027)
34	DF	ARG	Tobias Rubio (at Union-SF until 30 June 2027)
24	FW	ARG	Héctor Fértoli (at (Peru) Universitario until 31 December 2026)
26	MF	PAR	Richard Sánchez (at (Paraguay) Olimpia until 31 December 2026)
27	FW	ARG	Evelio Cardozo (at Nueva Chicago until 31 December 2026)
28	FW	ARG	Santiago Solari (at Newell's Old Boys until 30 June 2027)

No.	Pos.	Nation	Player
34	DF	ARG	Tobías Rubio (at Unión de Santa Fe until 30 June 2027)
35	DF	ARG	Santiago Quirós (at Platense until 31 December 2026)
37	FW	ARG	Matías Bergara (at Nueva Chicago until 31 December 2026)
37	FW	ARG	Gonzalo Reyna (at Universidad de Chile until 31 December 2026)
41	FW	ARG	Ramiro Degregorio (at (Uruguay) Liverpool (Montevideo) until 31 December 2026)
43	MF	ARG	Gonzalo Sosa (at (Uruguay) Deportivo Maldonado until 30 June 2027)
44	MF	ARG	Patricio Tanda (at (Paraguay) Guaraní until 31 December 2026)
47	DF	ARG	Ignacio Galván (at Atlético Tucumán until 31 December 2026)
49	MF	ARG	David González (at (Ecuador) Deportivo Cuenca until 31 December 2026)
58	FW	ARG	Tomás Pérez (at Defensa y Justicia until 30 June 2027)

=== Current coaching staff ===
Position	Staff
Head coach	(Argentina) Juan Pablo Vojvoda
Assistant coach	(Argentina) Gastón Liendo
Assistant coach	(Argentina) Nahuel Martínez
Fitness coach	(Argentina) Luis Azpiazu
Fitness coach	(Argentina) Danilo Volonte
Psychologist	(Argentina) Christian Rodríguez
Goalkeeping coach	(Argentina) Nacho González
Video analyst	(Argentina) Federico Anastasi
Video analyst	(Argentina) Ezequiel Scher
Video analyst	(Argentina) Alejandro Fusario
Doctor	(Argentina) Ariel De Toma
Doctor	(Argentina) Juan Martín Linares
Kinesiologist - Rehabilitation Specialist	(Argentina) Nasif Matías Balín
Kinesiologist	(Argentina) Rosendo Regueiro
Kinesiologist	(Argentina) Ignacio Astraldi
Kinesiologist	(Argentina) Hernán Javier Peláez
Masseur	(Argentina) Aníbal Luis González
Nutritionist	(Argentina) Karina Gavini
Nutritionist	(Argentina) Matías Beier
Sports psychologist - Neuroscience	(Argentina) Andrea Ricagno
Coordinator first team football	(Argentina) Damián Kimelman
Kit man	(Argentina) Oscar Gregorio Alvarez
Kit man	(Argentina) Carlos Chirón
Press officer	(Argentina) Fabián Alves da Costa
Professional football manager	(Argentina) Miguel Rosello
Sporting director	(Argentina) Sebastián Saja
Technical secretary	(Argentina) Javier Wainer
Team manager	(Argentina) Franco Zuculini
Scouting	(Argentina) Alejandro Bonamico
Scouting	(Argentina) Nicolás Pérez

Last updated: 22 June 2026
Source: Cuerpo Técnico

=== Managers since 2000 ===
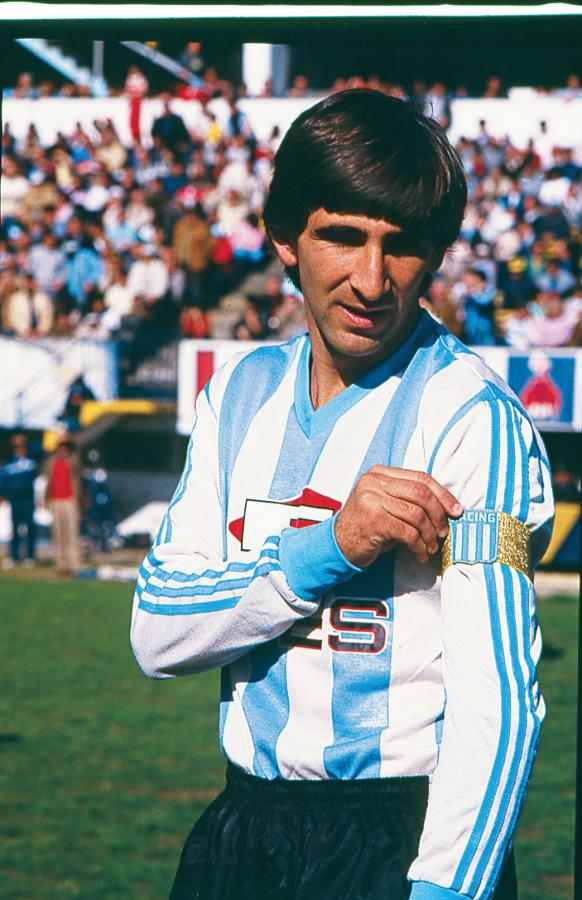
Gustavo Costas have had two tenures as manager of Racing

- (Argentina) Alberto Jorge
  (2000)
- (Argentina) Óscar López
  (2000)
- (Argentina) Reinaldo Merlo
  (2001)
- (Argentina) Osvaldo Ardiles
  (2002)
- (Argentina) Emilio Commisso
  (2003)
- (Argentina) Ángel Cappa
  (2003)
- (Argentina) Miguel Ángel Colombatti [es]
  (2003)
- (Argentina) Ubaldo Matildo Fillol
  (2003)
- (Argentina) Guillermo Rivarola
  (2004)
- (Argentina) Fernando Quiroz
  (2005)
- (Argentina) Alberto Fanesi
  (2006)
- (Argentina) Diego Simeone
  (19 Feb 2006–17 May 2006)
- (Argentina) Reinaldo Merlo
  (30 Apr 2006–31 March 2007)
- (Argentina) Miguel Ángel Micó
  (1 Apr 2007–24 Apr 2007)
- (Argentina) Gustavo Costas
  (25 Apr 2007–1 Dec 2007)
- (Argentina) Miguel Ángel Micó
  (1 Dec 2007–1 Apr 2008)
- (Argentina) Juan Manuel Llop
  (1 Apr 2008–22 Feb 2009)
- (Argentina) Ricardo Caruso Lombardi
  (26 Feb 2009–31 Oct 2009)
- (Argentina) Juan Barbas (interim)
  (31 Oct 2009–1 Nov 2009)
- (Argentina) Claudio Vivas
  (1 Nov 2009–15 Feb 2010)
- (Argentina) Miguel Ángel Russo
  (17 Feb 2010–23 Jun 2011)
- (Argentina) Diego Simeone
  (23 Jun 2011–22 Dec 2011)
- (Argentina) Alfio Basile
  (26 Dec 2011–15 Apr 2012)
- (Argentina) Luis Zubeldía
  (16 Apr 2012–25 Aug 2013)
- (Argentina) Carlos Ischia
  (30 Aug 2013–7 Oct 2013)
- (Argentina) Ignacio González (interim)
  (8 Oct 2013–13 Oct 2013)
- (Argentina) Reinaldo Merlo
  (14 Oct 2013–7 May 2014)
- (Argentina) Fabio Radaelli [es] (interim)
  (8 May 2014–15 Jun 2014)
- (Argentina) Diego Cocca
  (16 Jun 2014–31 Dec 2015)
- (Argentina) Facundo Sava
  (1 Jan 2016–15 Aug 2016)
- (Argentina) Claudio Ubeda (interim)
  (16 Aug 2016–28 Aug 2016)
- (Argentina) Ricardo Zielinski
  (29 Aug 2016–31 Dec 2016)
- (Argentina) Diego Cocca
  (1 Jan 2017–27 Nov 2017)
- (Argentina) Juan Ramón Fleita (interim)
  (28 Nov 2017–16 Dec 2017)
- (Argentina) Eduardo Coudet
  (17 Dec 2017–17 Dec 2019)
- (Argentina) Sebastián Beccacece
  (1 Jan 2020–9 Jan 2021)
- (Spain) Juan Antonio Pizzi
  (14 Jan 2021–8 Aug 2021)
- (Argentina) Claudio Úbeda (interim)
  (9 Aug 2021–20 Oct 2021)
- (Argentina) Fernando Gago
  (21 Oct 2021–30 Sept 2023)
- (Argentina) Gustavo Costas
  (1 Jan 2024–23 May 2026)
- (Argentina) Juan Pablo Vojvoda
  (22 Jun 2026–28 Sept 2026)
- (Argentina) Sebastian Romero (interim)
  (29 Sept 2026–present)

== Honours ==
=== Senior titles ===
Keys

- Record
- ^{(s)} Shared record

Type	Competition	Titles	Winning years
National (League)	Primera División	18	1913, 1914, 1915, 1916, 1917, 1918, 1919, 1921, 1925, 1949, 1950, 1951, 1958, 1961, 1966, 2001 Apertura, 2014, 2018–19
National (Cups)	Copa Dr. Carlos Ibarguren	5^{(s)}	1913, 1914, 1916, 1917, 1918
National (Cups)	Copa de Honor	4	1912, 1913, 1915, 1917
National (Cups)	Copa Beccar Varela	1^{(s)}	1932
National (Cups)	Copa de Competencia (LAF)	1^{(s)}	1933
National (Cups)	Copa de Competencia Británica	1^{(s)}	1945
National (Cups)	Trofeo de Campeones	2^{(s)}	2019, 2022
National (Cups)	Supercopa Internacional	1^{(s)}	2022
Continental	Copa Libertadores (Note: CONMEBOL competition)	1	1967
Continental	Supercopa Sudamericana	1	1988
Continental	Copa Sudamericana	1	2024
Continental	Recopa Sudamericana	1	2025
Continental	Copa de Honor Cousenier (Note: Organised together by AFA and AUF)	1	1913
Continental	Copa Aldao	2	1917, 1918
Worldwide	Intercontinental Cup (Note: Organised together by UEFA and CONMEBOL)	1	1967

=== Other titles ===
Titles won in lower divisions:

- Segunda División (3): 1910, 1924 AAm (Note: As the senior squad was competing in Primera División, Racing played with a reserve team.), 1926 AAm
- Copa Bullrich (1): 1910 (Note: The Copa Bullrich was an official football competition contested by clubs playing in the Second Division. The AFA has not included this competition into the list of national cups because only teams in Primera División participated in those competitions.)

== See also ==
- List of world champion football clubs
