= 2024 Copa Sudamericana =

Copa CONMEBOL Sudamericana 2024
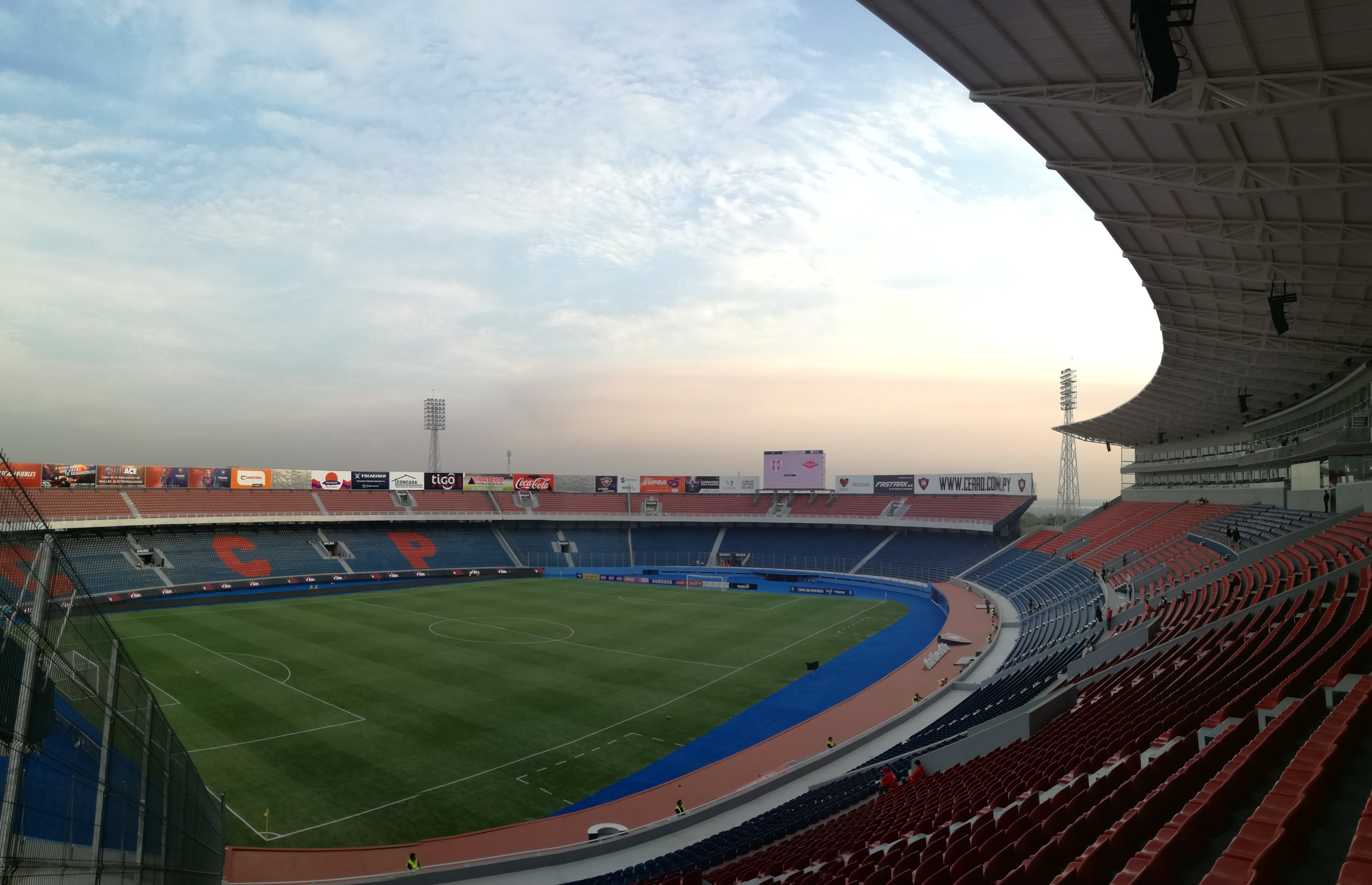
- The Estadio General Pablo Rojas in Asunción hosted the final

Tournament details
- Dates: 5 March – 23 November 2024
- Teams: 44+12 (from 10 associations)

Final positions
- Champions: (Argentina) Racing (1st title)
- Runners-up: (Brazil) Cruzeiro

Tournament statistics
- Matches played: 157
- Goals scored: 389 (2.48 per match)
- Attendance: 2,050,258 (13,059 per match)
- Top scorer: (Argentina) Adrián Martínez (10 goals)

The 2024 Copa CONMEBOL Sudamericana was the 23rd edition of the CONMEBOL Sudamericana (also referred to as the Copa Sudamericana), South America's secondary club football tournament organized by CONMEBOL. The competition began on 5 March and ended on 23 November 2024, with the final played in Asunción, Paraguay. Estadio General Pablo Rojas, also known as "La Nueva Olla", was announced as the host stadium for the final match on 7 October 2024.

Argentine club Racing were the champions, winning their first title in the competition after defeating Brazilian side Cruzeiro 3–1 in the final. As winners of the 2024 Copa Sudamericana, Racing earned the right to play against the winners of the 2024 Copa Libertadores in the 2025 Recopa Sudamericana and also automatically qualified for the 2025 Copa Libertadores group stage.

LDU Quito were the titleholders, defending their title after placing third in their Copa Libertadores group, but they were eliminated by Lanús in the round of 16.

== Teams ==
The following 44 teams from the 10 CONMEBOL associations qualified for the tournament:

- Argentina and Brazil: 6 berths each
- All other associations: 4 berths each

The entry stage was determined as follows:

- Group stage: 12 teams (teams from Argentina and Brazil)
- First stage: 32 teams (teams from all other associations)

Association	Team (Berth)	Entry stage	Qualification method
Argentina (6 berths)	Boca Juniors (Argentina 1)	Group stage	2023 Primera División and Copa de la Liga Profesional aggregate table best team not qualified for 2024 Copa Libertadores
Argentina (6 berths)	Racing (Argentina 2)	Group stage	2023 Primera División and Copa de la Liga Profesional aggregate table 2nd best team not qualified for 2024 Copa Libertadores
Argentina (6 berths)	Defensa y Justicia (Argentina 3)	Group stage	2023 Primera División and Copa de la Liga Profesional aggregate table 3rd best team not qualified for 2024 Copa Libertadores
Argentina (6 berths)	Lanús (Argentina 4)	Group stage	2023 Primera División and Copa de la Liga Profesional aggregate table 4th best team not qualified for 2024 Copa Libertadores
Argentina (6 berths)	Belgrano (Argentina 5)	Group stage	2023 Primera División and Copa de la Liga Profesional aggregate table 5th best team not qualified for 2024 Copa Libertadores
Argentina (6 berths)	Argentinos Juniors (Argentina 6)	Group stage	2023 Primera División and Copa de la Liga Profesional aggregate table 6th best team not qualified for 2024 Copa Libertadores
Bolivia (4 berths)	Jorge Wilstermann (Bolivia 1)	First stage	2023 Copa de la División Profesional runners-up
Bolivia (4 berths)	Nacional Potosí (Bolivia 2)	First stage	2023 Primera División and Copa de la División Profesional aggregate table best team not qualified for 2024 Copa Libertadores
Bolivia (4 berths)	Real Tomayapo (Bolivia 3)	First stage	2023 Primera División and Copa de la División Profesional aggregate table 2nd best team not qualified for 2024 Copa Libertadores
Bolivia (4 berths)	Universitario de Vinto (Bolivia 4)	First stage	2023 Primera División and Copa de la División Profesional aggregate table 4th best team not qualified for 2024 Copa Libertadores
Brazil (6 berths)	Athletico Paranaense (Brazil 1)	Group stage	2023 Campeonato Brasileiro Série A best team not qualified for 2024 Copa Libertadores
Brazil (6 berths)	Internacional (Brazil 2)	Group stage	2023 Campeonato Brasileiro Série A 2nd best team not qualified for 2024 Copa Libertadores
Brazil (6 berths)	Fortaleza (Brazil 3)	Group stage	2023 Campeonato Brasileiro Série A 3rd best team not qualified for 2024 Copa Libertadores
Brazil (6 berths)	Cuiabá (Brazil 4)	Group stage	2023 Campeonato Brasileiro Série A 4th best team not qualified for 2024 Copa Libertadores
Brazil (6 berths)	Corinthians (Brazil 5)	Group stage	2023 Campeonato Brasileiro Série A 5th best team not qualified for 2024 Copa Libertadores
Brazil (6 berths)	Cruzeiro (Brazil 6)	Group stage	2023 Campeonato Brasileiro Série A 6th best team not qualified for 2024 Copa Libertadores
Chile (4 berths)	Coquimbo Unido (Chile 1)	First stage	2023 Primera División best team not qualified for 2024 Copa Libertadores
Chile (4 berths)	Everton (Chile 2)	First stage	2023 Primera División 2nd best team not qualified for 2024 Copa Libertadores
Chile (4 berths)	Universidad Católica (Chile 3)	First stage	2023 Primera División 3rd best team not qualified for 2024 Copa Libertadores
Chile (4 berths)	Unión La Calera (Chile 4)	First stage	2023 Primera División 4th best team not qualified for 2024 Copa Libertadores
Colombia (4 berths)	Independiente Medellín (Colombia 1)	First stage	2023 Primera A aggregate table best team not qualified for 2024 Copa Libertadores
Colombia (4 berths)	América de Cali (Colombia 2)	First stage	2023 Primera A aggregate table 2nd best team not qualified for 2024 Copa Libertadores
Colombia (4 berths)	Deportes Tolima (Colombia 3)	First stage	2023 Primera A aggregate table 3rd best team not qualified for 2024 Copa Libertadores
Colombia (4 berths)	Alianza (Colombia 4)	First stage	2023 Primera A aggregate table 4th best team not qualified for 2024 Copa Libertadores
Ecuador (4 berths)	Delfín (Ecuador 1)	First stage	2023 Serie A aggregate table best team not qualified for 2024 Copa Libertadores
Ecuador (4 berths)	Universidad Católica (Ecuador 2)	First stage	2023 Serie A aggregate table 2nd best team not qualified for 2024 Copa Libertadores
Ecuador (4 berths)	Técnico Universitario (Ecuador 3)	First stage	2023 Serie A aggregate table 3rd best team not qualified for 2024 Copa Libertadores
Ecuador (4 berths)	Deportivo Cuenca (Ecuador 4)	First stage	2023 Serie A aggregate table 4th best team not qualified for 2024 Copa Libertadores
Paraguay (4 berths)	Guaraní (Paraguay 1)	First stage	2023 Primera División aggregate table best team not qualified for 2024 Copa Libertadores
Paraguay (4 berths)	Olimpia (Paraguay 2)	First stage	2023 Primera División aggregate table 2nd best team not qualified for 2024 Copa Libertadores
Paraguay (4 berths)	Sportivo Ameliano (Paraguay 3)	First stage	2023 Primera División aggregate table 3rd best team not qualified for 2024 Copa Libertadores
Paraguay (4 berths)	Sportivo Luqueño (Paraguay 4)	First stage	2023 Primera División aggregate table 4th best team not qualified for 2024 Copa Libertadores
Peru (4 berths)	Sport Huancayo (Peru 1)	First stage	2023 Liga 1 aggregate table best team not qualified for 2024 Copa Libertadores
Peru (4 berths)	ADT (Peru 2)	First stage	2023 Liga 1 aggregate table 2nd best team not qualified for 2024 Copa Libertadores
Peru (4 berths)	Deportivo Garcilaso (Peru 3)	First stage	2023 Liga 1 aggregate table 3rd best team not qualified for 2024 Copa Libertadores
Peru (4 berths)	Universidad César Vallejo (Peru 4)	First stage	2023 Liga 1 aggregate table 4th best team not qualified for 2024 Copa Libertadores
Uruguay (4 berths)	Montevideo Wanderers (Uruguay 1)	First stage	2023 Primera División aggregate table best team not qualified for 2024 Copa Libertadores
Uruguay (4 berths)	Racing (Uruguay 2)	First stage	2023 Primera División aggregate table 2nd best team not qualified for 2024 Copa Libertadores
Uruguay (4 berths)	Cerro Largo (Uruguay 3)	First stage	2023 Primera División aggregate table 3rd best team not qualified for 2024 Copa Libertadores
Uruguay (4 berths)	Danubio (Uruguay 4)	First stage	2023 Primera División aggregate table 4th best team not qualified for 2024 Copa Libertadores
Venezuela (4 berths)	Carabobo (Venezuela 1)	First stage	2023 Primera División best team not qualified for 2024 Copa Libertadores
Venezuela (4 berths)	Deportivo La Guaira (Venezuela 2)	First stage	2023 Primera División 2nd best team not qualified for 2024 Copa Libertadores
Venezuela (4 berths)	Metropolitanos (Venezuela 3)	First stage	2023 Primera División 3rd best team not qualified for 2024 Copa Libertadores
Venezuela (4 berths)	Rayo Zuliano (Venezuela 4)	First stage	2023 Primera División 4th best team not qualified for 2024 Copa Libertadores

Notes

1. Colombia (COL): On 16 January 2024, Alianza Petrolera relocated to Valledupar and was rebranded as Alianza F.C.

A further 12 teams eliminated from the 2024 Copa Libertadores will be transferred to the Copa Sudamericana, entering the group stage and the knockout round play-offs.

Teams eliminated in third stage	Entry stage
(Brazil) Red Bull Bragantino	Group stage
(Paraguay) Nacional	Group stage
(Bolivia) Always Ready	Group stage
(Paraguay) Sportivo Trinidense	Group stage
Third-placed teams in group stage	Entry stage
(Paraguay) Cerro Porteño	Knockout round play-offs
(Ecuador) Barcelona	Knockout round play-offs
(Chile) Huachipato	Knockout round play-offs
(Ecuador) LDU Quito	Knockout round play-offs
(Chile) Palestino	Knockout round play-offs
(Ecuador) Independiente del Valle	Knockout round play-offs
(Argentina) Rosario Central	Knockout round play-offs
(Paraguay) Libertad	Knockout round play-offs

== Schedule ==
The schedule of the competition was as follows:

Stage	Draw date	First leg	Second leg
First stage	19 December 2023	5–7 March 2024	
Group stage	18 March 2024	Matchday 1: 2–4 April 2024; Matchday 2: 9–11 April 2024; Matchday 3: 23–25 April 2024; Matchday 4: 7–9 May 2024; Matchday 5: 14–16 May 2024; Matchday 6: 28–30 May 2024	
Knockout round play-offs	No draw	16–18 July 2024	23–25 July 2024
Round of 16	3 June 2024	13–15 August 2024	20–22 August 2024
Quarter-finals	3 June 2024	17–19 September 2024	24–26 September 2024
Semi-finals	3 June 2024	23–24 October 2024	30–31 October 2024
Final	3 June 2024	23 November 2024 at Estadio General Pablo Rojas, Asunción	

== Draws ==
Location of teams of the 2024 Copa Sudamericana.
Brown: Group A; Red: Group B; Orange: Group C;
Yellow: Group D; Green: Group E; Blue: Group F;
Purple: Group G; Pink: Group H; White: First stage;
Turquoise: Knockout round play-offs entrants.
(L) Teams transferred from the 2024 Copa Libertadores.

The draw for the first stage was held on 19 December 2023, 12:00 PYST (UTC−3), at the CONMEBOL Convention Centre in Luque, Paraguay.

For the first stage, the 32 teams involved were divided into eight pots according to their national association. The 32 teams were drawn into 16 ties, with the four teams from each national association being drawn against a rival from the same association in two ties per association. The draw for the group stage was held on 18 March 2024, 20:00 PYST (UTC−3), at the CONMEBOL Convention Centre in Luque, Paraguay.

Teams were seeded by their CONMEBOL Clubs ranking as of 18 December 2023 (shown in parentheses), taking into account the following three factors:

1. Performance in the last 10 years, taking into account Copa Libertadores and Copa Sudamericana results in the period 2014–2023.
2. Historical coefficient, taking into account Copa Libertadores and Copa Sudamericana results in the period 1960–2013 and 2002–2013 respectively.
3. Local tournament champion, with bonus points awarded to domestic league champions of the last 10 years.

For the group stage, the 32 teams were drawn into eight groups (Groups A–H) of four containing a team from each of the four pots. The four losers of the Copa Libertadores third stage were seeded into Pot 4. Teams from the same association could not be drawn into the same group.

Group stage draw
Pot 1	Pot 2	Pot 3	Pot 4
(Argentina) Boca Juniors (3); (Brazil) Athletico Paranaense (6); (Brazil) Internacional (11); (Argentina) Racing (20); (Brazil) Corinthians (22); (Argentina) Defensa y Justicia (29); (Brazil) Cruzeiro (33); (Argentina) Lanús (35)	(Brazil) Fortaleza (39); (Argentina) Argentinos Juniors (46); (Colombia) Independiente Medellín (51); (Ecuador) Delfín (78); (Chile) Unión La Calera (80); (Uruguay) Danubio (87); (Venezuela) Metropolitanos (91); (Chile) Coquimbo Unido (95)	(Ecuador) Universidad Católica (99); (Peru) Universidad César Vallejo (118); (Paraguay) Sportivo Luqueño (133); (Brazil) Cuiabá (142); (Bolivia) Nacional Potosí (167); (Argentina) Belgrano (195); (Uruguay) Racing (210); (Paraguay) Sportivo Ameliano (236)	(Bolivia) Real Tomayapo (No rank); (Colombia) Alianza (No rank); (Peru) Deportivo Garcilaso (No rank); (Venezuela) Rayo Zuliano (No rank); (Brazil) Red Bull Bragantino (41); (Paraguay) Nacional (84); (Bolivia) Always Ready (74); (Paraguay) Sportivo Trinidense (No rank)

Notes

1. ^{CLQ3} The Copa Libertadores third stage losers were seeded in Pot 4.

The draw for the round of 16 was held on 3 June 2024, 12:00 PYT (UTC−4) in Asunción, Paraguay. For the round of 16, the 16 teams were drawn into eight ties (A–H) between a Copa Sudamericana group winner (Pot 1) and a knockout round play-offs winner (Pot 2), with the group winners hosting the second leg. Teams from the same association or the same group could be drawn into the same tie (Regulations Article 2.2.3.2).

== First stage ==
In the first stage, each tie was played on a single-leg basis, with the winner being decided in a penalty shoot-out in case of a draw after 90 minutes.

The 16 winners of the first stage advanced to the group stage to join the 12 teams directly qualified for that stage (six from Argentina and six from Brazil), and four teams transferred from the Copa Libertadores (the four teams eliminated in the third stage of qualifying).

Team 1	Score	Team 2
Universitario de Vinto (Bolivia)	0–2	(Bolivia) Nacional Potosí
Real Tomayapo (Bolivia)	0–0 (4–3 p)	(Bolivia) Jorge Wilstermann
Everton (Chile)	0–1	(Chile) Unión La Calera
Universidad Católica (Chile)	0–2	(Chile) Coquimbo Unido
Deportes Tolima (Colombia)	0–0 (2–4 p)	(Colombia) Independiente Medellín
Alianza (Colombia)	2–1	(Colombia) América de Cali
Deportivo Cuenca (Ecuador)	2–5	(Ecuador) Delfín
Técnico Universitario (Ecuador)	0–3	(Ecuador) Universidad Católica
Guaraní (Paraguay)	0–1	(Paraguay) Sportivo Luqueño
Sportivo Ameliano (Paraguay)	2–0	(Paraguay) Olimpia
Deportivo Garcilaso (Peru)	0–0 (4–3 p)	(Peru) ADT
Universidad César Vallejo (Peru)	2–0	(Peru) Sport Huancayo
Montevideo Wanderers (Uruguay)	0–1	(Uruguay) Danubio
Racing (Uruguay)	2–0	(Uruguay) Cerro Largo
Carabobo (Venezuela)	1–1 (4–5 p)	(Venezuela) Metropolitanos
Rayo Zuliano (Venezuela)	0–0 (4–2 p)	(Venezuela) Deportivo La Guaira

== Group stage ==
In the group stage, each group was played on a home-and-away round-robin basis. The teams were ranked according to the following criteria: 1. Points (3 points for a win, 1 point for a draw, and 0 points for a loss); 2. Goal difference; 3. Goals scored; 4. Away goals scored; 5. CONMEBOL ranking (Regulations Article 2.4.2).

The winners of each group advanced to the round of 16 of the final stages, whilst the runners-up of each group advanced to the knockout round play-offs of the final stages.

=== Group A ===
Pos	Team	Pld	W	D	L	GF	GA	GD	Pts	Qualification	DIM	CAR	DYJ	UCV
1	(Colombia) Independiente Medellín	6	4	1	1	16	7	+9	13	Round of 16	—	4–0	2–1	4–2
2	(Bolivia) Always Ready	6	3	2	1	10	7	+3	11	Knockout round play-offs	2–0	—	3–0	2–0
3	(Argentina) Defensa y Justicia	6	1	2	3	4	8	−4	5		1–1	1–1	—	0–1
4	(Peru) Universidad César Vallejo	6	1	1	4	6	14	−8	4		1–5	2–2	0–1	—

Source: CONMEBOL

=== Group B ===
Pos	Team	Pld	W	D	L	GF	GA	GD	Pts	Qualification	CRU	UCA	ALI	ULC
1	(Brazil) Cruzeiro	6	3	3	0	8	3	+5	12	Round of 16	—	1–0	3–3	1–0
2	(Ecuador) Universidad Católica	6	3	2	1	8	2	+6	11	Knockout round play-offs	0–0	—	0–0	4–0
3	(Colombia) Alianza	6	1	2	3	5	10	−5	5		0–3	1–3	—	0–1
4	(Chile) Unión La Calera	6	1	1	4	1	7	−6	4		0–0	0–1	0–1	—

Source: CONMEBOL

=== Group C ===
Pos	Team	Pld	W	D	L	GF	GA	GD	Pts	Qualification	BEL	INT	DEL	RTO
1	(Argentina) Belgrano	6	3	3	0	7	3	+4	12	Round of 16	—	0–0	1–1	1–0
2	(Brazil) Internacional	6	3	2	1	6	3	+3	11	Knockout round play-offs	1–2	—	1–0	0–0
3	(Ecuador) Delfín	6	2	2	2	9	8	+1	8		1–1	1–2	—	4–3
4	(Bolivia) Real Tomayapo	6	0	1	5	3	11	−8	1		0–2	0–2	0–2	—

Source: CONMEBOL

=== Group D ===
Pos	Team	Pld	W	D	L	GF	GA	GD	Pts	Qualification	FOR	BOC	NAP	TRI
1	(Brazil) Fortaleza	6	4	1	1	15	8	+7	13	Round of 16	—	4–2	5–0	2–1
2	(Argentina) Boca Juniors	6	3	2	1	10	6	+4	11	Knockout round play-offs	1–1	—	4–0	1–0
3	(Bolivia) Nacional Potosí	6	2	1	3	6	13	−7	7		4–1	0–0	—	2–1
4	(Paraguay) Sportivo Trinidense	6	1	0	5	5	9	−4	3		0–2	1–2	2–0	—

Source: CONMEBOL

=== Group E ===
Pos	Team	Pld	W	D	L	GF	GA	GD	Pts	Qualification	SPA	CAP	DAN	DRZ
1	(Paraguay) Sportivo Ameliano	6	4	1	1	9	5	+4	13	Round of 16	—	1–4	2–1	1–0
2	(Brazil) Athletico Paranaense	6	4	0	2	17	5	+12	12	Knockout round play-offs	0–1	—	1–2	6–0
3	(Uruguay) Danubio	6	2	2	2	5	4	+1	8		0–0	0–1	—	0–0
4	(Venezuela) Rayo Zuliano	6	0	1	5	1	18	−17	1		0–4	1–5	0–2	—

Source: CONMEBOL

=== Group F ===
Pos	Team	Pld	W	D	L	GF	GA	GD	Pts	Qualification	COR	RCM	ARG	NAC
1	(Brazil) Corinthians	6	4	1	1	14	2	+12	13	Round of 16	—	3–0	4–0	4–0
2	(Uruguay) Racing	6	3	2	1	10	8	+2	11	Knockout round play-offs	1–1	—	2–1	2–1
3	(Argentina) Argentinos Juniors	6	3	0	3	7	12	−5	9		1–0	0–3	—	2–1
4	(Paraguay) Nacional	6	0	1	5	6	15	−9	1		0–2	2–2	2–3	—

Source: CONMEBOL

=== Group G ===
Pos	Team	Pld	W	D	L	GF	GA	GD	Pts	Qualification	LAN	CUI	GAR	MET
1	(Argentina) Lanús	6	4	1	1	12	3	+9	13	Round of 16	—	0–1	2–1	5–0
2	(Brazil) Cuiabá	6	3	3	0	9	3	+6	12	Knockout round play-offs	1–1	—	1–1	3–0
3	(Peru) Deportivo Garcilaso	6	1	3	2	7	9	−2	6		0–2	1–1	—	3–2
4	(Venezuela) Metropolitanos	6	0	1	5	3	16	−13	1		0–2	0–2	1–1	—

Source: CONMEBOL

=== Group H ===
Pos	Team	Pld	W	D	L	GF	GA	GD	Pts	Qualification	RAC	RBB	COQ	SLU
1	(Argentina) Racing	6	5	0	1	14	3	+11	15	Round of 16	—	3–0	3–0	3–0
2	(Brazil) Red Bull Bragantino	6	4	1	1	9	8	+1	13	Knockout round play-offs	2–1	—	1–0	2–1
3	(Chile) Coquimbo Unido	6	1	2	3	3	7	−4	5		1–2	1–1	—	1–0
4	(Paraguay) Sportivo Luqueño	6	0	1	5	3	11	−8	1		0–2	2–3	0–0	—

Source: CONMEBOL

== Final stages ==
Starting from the knockout round play-offs, the teams played a single-elimination tournament with the following rules:

- In the knockout round play-offs, round of 16, quarter-finals and semi-finals, each tie was played on a home-and-away two-legged basis, with the higher-seeded team hosting the second leg (Regulations Article 2.2.3). If tied on aggregate, extra time would not be played, and a penalty shoot-out was used to determine the winners (Regulations Article 2.4.4).
- The final was played as a single match at a venue pre-selected by CONMEBOL, with the higher-seeded team designated as the "home" team for administrative purposes (Regulations Article 2.2.6). If tied after regulation, 30 minutes of extra time would be played. If still tied after extra time, a penalty shoot-out would be used to determine the winners (Regulations Article 2.4.5).

=== Seeding ===
For the final stages, the teams were seeded according to their results in the group stage, with the Copa Sudamericana group winners seeded 1–8, the Copa Sudamericana group runners-up seeded 9–16, and the Copa Libertadores group third-placed teams seeded 17–24. For the round of 16 draw, the seeds 1–8 made up Pot 1, and the eight knockout round play-offs winners (seeds 9–24) made up Pot 2, keeping their seed. Teams from the same association could play each other from the knockout round play-offs onwards.

Seed	Grp	Team	Pld	W	D	L	GF	GA	GD	Pts	Qualification
1	SH1	(Argentina) Racing	6	5	0	1	14	3	+11	15	Round of 16
2	SF1	(Brazil) Corinthians	6	4	1	1	14	2	+12	13	Round of 16
3	SA1	(Colombia) Independiente Medellín	6	4	1	1	16	7	+9	13	Round of 16
4	SG1	(Argentina) Lanús	6	4	1	1	12	3	+9	13	Round of 16
5	SD1	(Brazil) Fortaleza	6	4	1	1	15	8	+7	13	Round of 16
6	SE1	(Paraguay) Sportivo Ameliano	6	4	1	1	9	5	+4	13	Round of 16
7	SB1	(Brazil) Cruzeiro	6	3	3	0	8	3	+5	12	Round of 16
8	SC1	(Argentina) Belgrano	6	3	3	0	7	3	+4	12	Round of 16
9	SH2	(Brazil) Red Bull Bragantino	6	4	1	1	9	8	+1	13	Play-off Match A
10	SE2	(Brazil) Athletico Paranaense	6	4	0	2	17	5	+12	12	Play-off Match B
11	SG2	(Brazil) Cuiabá	6	3	3	0	9	3	+6	12	Play-off Match C
12	SB2	(Ecuador) Universidad Católica	6	3	2	1	8	2	+6	11	Play-off Match D
13	SD2	(Argentina) Boca Juniors	6	3	2	1	10	6	+4	11	Play-off Match E
14	SA2	(Bolivia) Always Ready	6	3	2	1	10	7	+3	11	Play-off Match F
15	SC2	(Brazil) Internacional	6	3	2	1	6	3	+3	11	Play-off Match G
16	SF2	(Uruguay) Racing	6	3	2	1	10	8	+2	11	Play-off Match H
17	LC	(Chile) Huachipato	6	2	2	2	7	9	−2	8	Play-off Match H
18	LG	(Argentina) Rosario Central	6	2	1	3	8	7	+1	7	Play-off Match G
19	LD	(Ecuador) LDU Quito	6	2	1	3	6	6	0	7	Play-off Match F
20	LF	(Ecuador) Independiente del Valle	6	2	1	3	8	9	−1	7	Play-off Match E
21	LH	(Paraguay) Libertad	6	2	1	3	7	8	−1	7	Play-off Match D
22	LE	(Chile) Palestino	6	2	1	3	6	11	−5	7	Play-off Match C
23	LA	(Paraguay) Cerro Porteño	6	1	3	2	4	5	−1	6	Play-off Match B
24	LB	(Ecuador) Barcelona	6	1	3	2	6	9	−3	6	Play-off Match A

Source: CONMEBOL Sudamericana, CONMEBOL Libertadores
Rules for classification: 1) Higher position in group; 2) Points; 3) Goal difference; 4) Goals scored; 5) Away goals scored; 6) CONMEBOL ranking (Regulations Article 2.4.3).

=== Bracket ===
The bracket was decided based on the round of 16 draw, which was held on 3 June 2024.

Knockout round play-offs
18	(Argentina) Rosario Central	1	1	2
15	(Brazil) Internacional	0	1	1
24	(Ecuador) Barcelona	1	2	3
9	(Brazil) Red Bull Bragantino	1	3	4
23	(Paraguay) Cerro Porteño	1	1	2
10	(Brazil) Athletico Paranaense	1	2	3
17	(Chile) Huachipato (p)	2	1	3 (3)
16	(Uruguay) Racing	3	0	3 (0)
21	(Paraguay) Libertad	2	1	3
12	(Ecuador) Universidad Católica	0	1	1
20	(Ecuador) Independiente del Valle	0	0	0
13	(Argentina) Boca Juniors	0	1	1
19	(Ecuador) LDU Quito	3	1	4
14	(Bolivia) Always Ready	0	3	3
22	(Chile) Palestino	1	2	3
11	(Brazil) Cuiabá	1	1	2

Round of 16
18	(Argentina) Rosario Central	1	1	2
5	(Brazil) Fortaleza	1	3	4
9	(Brazil) Red Bull Bragantino	1	2	3 (4)
2	(Brazil) Corinthians (p)	2	1	3 (5)
10	(Brazil) Athletico Paranaense	2	2	4
8	(Argentina) Belgrano	1	0	1
17	(Chile) Huachipato	0	1	1
1	(Argentina) Racing	2	6	8
21	(Paraguay) Libertad (p)	1	0	1 (4)
6	(Paraguay) Sportivo Ameliano	1	0	1 (3)
13	(Argentina) Boca Juniors	1	1	2 (4)
7	(Brazil) Cruzeiro (p)	0	2	2 (5)
19	(Ecuador) LDU Quito	1	1	2
4	(Argentina) Lanús	2	3	5
15	(Chile) Palestino	2	0	2
3	(Colombia) Independiente Medellín	2	4	6

Quarter-finals
5	(Brazil) Fortaleza	0	0	0
2	(Brazil) Corinthians	2	3	5
10	(Brazil) Athletico Paranaense	1	1	2
1	(Argentina) Racing	0	4	4
21	(Paraguay) Libertad	0	1	1
7	(Brazil) Cruzeiro	2	1	3
4	(Argentina) Lanús (p)	0	1	1 (6)
3	(Colombia) Independiente Medellín	0	1	1 (5)

Semi-finals
2	(Brazil) Corinthians	2	1	3
1	(Argentina) Racing	2	2	4
7	(Brazil) Cruzeiro	1	1	2
4	(Argentina) Lanús	1	0	1

Final
23 November – Asunción
1	(Argentina) Racing	3
7	(Brazil) Cruzeiro	1

=== Knockout round play-offs ===
Team 1	Agg.	Team 2	1st leg	2nd leg
Barcelona (Ecuador)	3–4	(Brazil) Red Bull Bragantino	1–1	2–3
Cerro Porteño (Paraguay)	2–3	(Brazil) Athletico Paranaense	1–1	1–2
Palestino (Chile)	3–2	(Brazil) Cuiabá	1–1	2–1
Libertad (Paraguay)	3–1	(Ecuador) Universidad Católica	2–0	1–1
Independiente del Valle (Ecuador)	0–1	(Argentina) Boca Juniors	0–0	0–1
LDU Quito (Ecuador)	4–3	(Bolivia) Always Ready	3–0	1–3
Rosario Central (Argentina)	2–1	(Brazil) Internacional	1–0	1–1
Huachipato (Chile)	3–3 (3–0 p)	(Uruguay) Racing	2–3	1–0

=== Round of 16 ===
Team 1	Agg.	Team 2	1st leg	2nd leg
Rosario Central (Argentina)	2–4	(Brazil) Fortaleza	1–1	1–3
Libertad (Paraguay)	1–1 (4–3 p)	(Paraguay) Sportivo Ameliano	1–1	0–0
LDU Quito (Ecuador)	2–5	(Argentina) Lanús	1–2	1–3
Huachipato (Chile)	1–8	(Argentina) Racing	0–2	1–6
Athletico Paranaense (Brazil)	4–1	(Argentina) Belgrano	2–1	2–0
Palestino (Chile)	2–6	(Colombia) Independiente Medellín	2–2	0–4
Boca Juniors (Argentina)	2–2 (4–5 p)	(Brazil) Cruzeiro	1–0	1–2
Red Bull Bragantino (Brazil)	3–3 (4–5 p)	(Brazil) Corinthians	1–2	2–1

=== Quarter-finals ===
Team 1	Agg.	Team 2	1st leg	2nd leg
Fortaleza (Brazil)	0–5	(Brazil) Corinthians	0–2	0–3
Libertad (Paraguay)	1–3	(Brazil) Cruzeiro	0–2	1–1
Lanús (Argentina)	1–1 (6–5 p)	(Colombia) Independiente Medellín	0–0	1–1
Athletico Paranaense (Brazil)	2–4	(Argentina) Racing	1–0	1–4

=== Semi-finals ===
Team 1	Agg.	Team 2	1st leg	2nd leg
Corinthians (Brazil)	3–4	(Argentina) Racing	2–2	1–2
Cruzeiro (Brazil)	2–1	(Argentina) Lanús	1–1	1–0

=== Final ===
23 November 2024
17:00 UTC−3

Racing (Argentina)	3–1	(Brazil) Cruzeiro
Martirena 15'; A. Martínez 20'; R. Martínez 90+5'	Report	Kaio Jorge 52'

Estadio General Pablo Rojas, Asunción
Attendance: 43,828
Referee: Esteban Ostojich (Uruguay)

== Statistics ==
=== Top scorers ===
Rank	Player	Team	1S	GS1	GS2	GS3	GS4	GS5	GS6	KPO1	KPO2	⅛F1	⅛F2	QF1	QF2	SF1	SF2	F	Total
1	(Argentina) Adrián Martínez	(Argentina) Racing		1	1	1		2	1			1	1		1			1	10
2	(Brazil) Yuri Alberto	(Brazil) Corinthians		1	1		1	2						1		2	1		9
3	(Uruguay) Gonzalo Mastriani	(Brazil) Athletico Paranaense		2	1		2				1		1						7
3	(Argentina) Juan Martín Lucero	(Brazil) Fortaleza			2	2	1		1				1						7
3	(Argentina) Walter Bou	(Argentina) Lanús			1	2	1	2					1						7
6	(Colombia) Brayan León	(Colombia) Independiente Medellín			1	1	2	1	1										6
7	(Uruguay) Edinson Cavani	(Argentina) Boca Juniors					1	1	1		1	1							5
7	(Brazil) Helinho	(Brazil) Red Bull Bragantino						2	1	1		1							5
7	(Panama) Ismael Díaz	(Ecuador) Universidad Católica	2		1	1	1												5
7	(Brazil) Kaio Jorge	(Brazil) Cruzeiro												1	1	1	1	1	5
7	(Ecuador) José Angulo	(Ecuador) Delfín	2	1			1		1										5
7	(Colombia) Roger Martínez	(Argentina) Racing		1	1				1						1			1	5
7	(Argentina) Tomás Verón Lupi	(Uruguay) Racing	1		2	1	1												5
7	(Brazil) Yago Pikachu	(Brazil) Fortaleza		1	1	2							1						5

Source: CONMEBOL

== See also ==
- 2024 Copa Libertadores
- 2024 Recopa Sudamericana
