= 2025 Copa Libertadores final =

Final match of the 66th Copa Libertadores edition

- Promotional poster of the final
- Event: 2025 Copa Libertadores
Palmeiras	Flamengo
(Brazil)	(Brazil)
0	1
- Date: 29 November 2025
- Venue: Estadio Monumental, Lima
- Referee: Darío Herrera (Argentina)
- Attendance: 70,048

The 2025 Copa Libertadores final was the final match which decided the winner of the 2025 Copa Libertadores. This was the 66th edition of the Copa Libertadores, the top-tier South American continental club football tournament organized by CONMEBOL.

The match was played by Brazilian clubs Palmeiras and Flamengo on 29 November 2025 at the Estadio Monumental in Lima, Peru, in a rematch of the 2021 final.

Flamengo won their fourth Copa Libertadores title and became the first Brazilian team to win four titles in the competition by defeating Palmeiras 1–0. As winners of the 2025 Copa Libertadores, Flamengo qualified for the 2025 FIFA Intercontinental Cup and the 2029 FIFA Club World Cup and also earned the right to play against the winners of the 2025 Copa Sudamericana, Lanús, in the 2026 Recopa Sudamericana. They also automatically qualified for the 2026 Copa Libertadores group stage.

== Venue ==
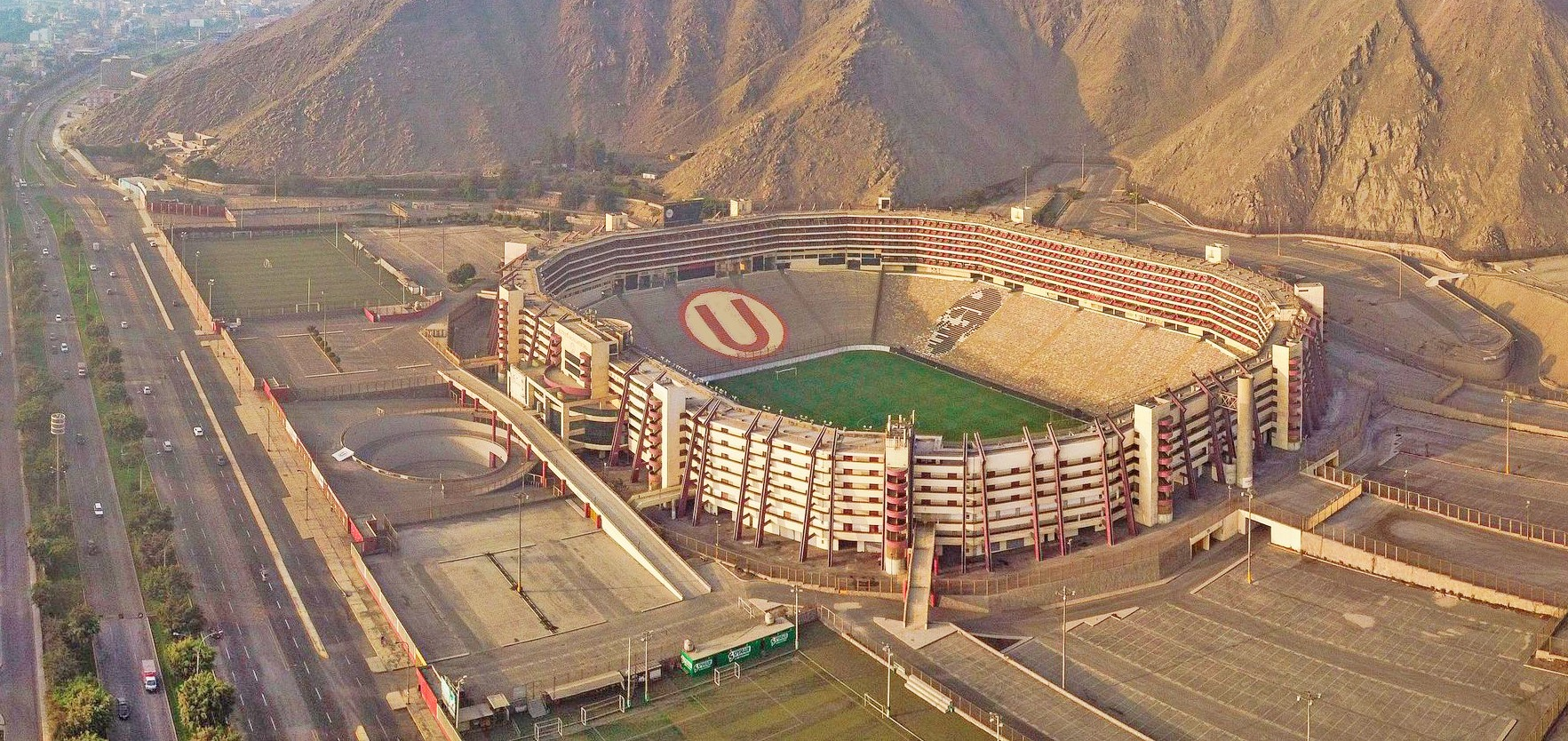
The Estadio Monumental in Lima hosted the final.

On 28 April 2025, Lima was announced as the host city for the final match of the 2025 Copa Libertadores at a stadium to be confirmed, following an application made by the Peruvian Football Federation. The appointment was confirmed after a meeting between the president of CONMEBOL Alejandro Domínguez and the president of Peru Dina Boluarte, who stated that the Peruvian government would commit to providing the necessary guarantees for the event to take place.

On 11 August 2025, CONMEBOL confirmed Estadio Monumental as the venue for the final match. This was the fourth Copa Libertadores final played in the Peruvian capital and the second held at Estadio Monumental after the 2019 one, in which Brazilian club Flamengo defeated Argentine side River Plate.

== Teams ==
Team	Previous finals appearances (bold indicates winners)
(Brazil) Palmeiras	6 (1961, 1968, **1999**, 2000, **2020**, **2021**)
(Brazil) Flamengo	4 (**1981**, **2019**, 2021, **2022**)

== Road to the final ==
Note: In all scores below, the score of the home team is given first.

(Brazil) Palmeiras			Round	(Brazil) Flamengo		
Opponent	Venue	Score		Opponent	Venue	Score
Bye			Qualifying stages	Bye		
**Group G**			Group stage	**Group C**		
(Peru) Sporting Cristal	Away	2–3	Group stage	(Venezuela) Deportivo Táchira	Away	0–1
(Paraguay) Cerro Porteño	Home	1–0	Group stage	(Argentina) Central Córdoba	Home	1–2
(Bolivia) Bolívar	Away	2–3	Group stage	(Ecuador) LDU Quito	Away	0–0
(Paraguay) Cerro Porteño	Away	0–2	Group stage	(Argentina) Central Córdoba	Away	1–1
(Bolivia) Bolívar	Home	2–0	Group stage	(Ecuador) LDU Quito	Home	2–0
(Peru) Sporting Cristal	Home	6–0	Group stage	(Venezuela) Deportivo Táchira	Home	1–0
Pos / Team / Pld / Pts; **1** / (Brazil) Palmeiras / **6** / **18**; 2 / (Paraguay) Cerro Porteño / 6 / **7**; 3 / (Bolivia) Bolívar / 6 / **6**; 4 / (Peru) Sporting Cristal / 6 / **4**; Source: CONMEBOL			Group stage	Pos / Team / Pld / Pts; 1 / (Ecuador) LDU Quito / 6 / **11**; **2** / (Brazil) Flamengo / **6** / **11**; 3 / (Argentina) Central Córdoba / 6 / **11**; 4 / (Venezuela) Deportivo Táchira / 6 / **0**; Source: CONMEBOL		
**Seed 1**			Final stages	**Seed 11**		
(Peru) Universitario (won 4–0 on aggregate)	Away	0–4	Round of 16	(Brazil) Internacional (won 3–0 on aggregate)	Home	1–0
(Peru) Universitario (won 4–0 on aggregate)	Home	0–0	Round of 16	(Brazil) Internacional (won 3–0 on aggregate)	Away	0–2
(Argentina) River Plate (won 5–2 on aggregate)	Away	1–2	Quarter-finals	(Argentina) Estudiantes (tied 2–2 on aggregate, won on penalties)	Home	2–1
(Argentina) River Plate (won 5–2 on aggregate)	Home	3–1	Quarter-finals	(Argentina) Estudiantes (tied 2–2 on aggregate, won on penalties)	Away	0–1 (2–4 p)
(Ecuador) LDU Quito (won 4–3 on aggregate)	Away	3–0	Semi-finals	(Argentina) Racing (won 1–0 on aggregate)	Home	1–0
(Ecuador) LDU Quito (won 4–3 on aggregate)	Home	4–0	Semi-finals	(Argentina) Racing (won 1–0 on aggregate)	Away	0–0

== Format ==
The final was played as a single match at a pre-selected venue, with the higher-seeded team designated as the "home" team for administrative purposes. If scores were level after full time, 30 minutes of extra time would be played. If still tied after extra time, a penalty shoot-out would be used to determine the winner.

== Match ==
Weverton, Lucas Evangelista and Paulinho (Palmeiras) and Pedro (Flamengo) missed the final due to injuries, as well as Gonzalo Plata (Flamengo), who was ruled out due to suspension.

=== Summary ===
In the 67th minute, Flamengo took the lead when Danilo scored the only goal of the game with a header to the left corner of the net after a corner from the right, took by Giorgian De Arascaeta.

=== Details ===
29 November 2025
16:15 UTC−5

Palmeiras (Brazil)	0–1	(Brazil) Flamengo
	Report	Danilo 67'

Estadio Monumental, Lima
Attendance: 70,048
Referee: Darío Herrera (Argentina)

**Palmeiras**	**Flamengo**

GK	1	(Brazil) Carlos Miguel
CB	3	(Brazil) Bruno Fuchs
CB	15	(Paraguay) Gustavo Gómez (c)
CB	26	(Brazil) Murilo	(yellow card) 77'	(substituted off) 78'
RM	12	(Brazil) Khellven		(substituted off) 78'
CM	23	(Brazil) Raphael Veiga	(yellow card) 13'	(substituted off) 72'
CM	8	(Brazil) Andreas Pereira
LM	22	(Uruguay) Joaquín Piquerez	(yellow card) 56'
RF	40	(Brazil) Allan		(substituted off) 72'
CF	42	(Argentina) José Manuel López
LF	9	(Brazil) Vitor Roque
Substitutes:
GK	14	(Brazil) Marcelo Lomba
DF	4	(Argentina) Agustín Giay		(substituted on) 78'
DF	6	(Brazil) Jefté
DF	13	(Brazil) Micael
DF	43	(Brazil) Benedetti
MF	5	(Argentina) Aníbal Moreno
MF	7	(Brazil) Felipe Anderson		(substituted on) 72'	(substituted off) 87'
MF	18	(Brazil) Maurício	(yellow card) 90+1'		(substituted on) 87'
MF	32	(Uruguay) Emiliano Martínez
FW	11	(Brazil) Bruno Rodrigues
FW	17	(Uruguay) Facundo Torres		(substituted on) 72'
FW	19	(Paraguay) Ramón Sosa		(substituted on) 78'
Manager:
(Portugal) Abel Ferreira

GK	1	(Argentina) Agustín Rossi
RB	2	(Uruguay) Guillermo Varela
CB	13	(Brazil) Danilo
CB	4	(Brazil) Léo Pereira
LB	26	(Brazil) Alex Sandro
CM	5	(Chile) Erick Pulgar	(yellow card) 30'
CM	21	(Italy) Jorginho	(yellow card) 38'
RW	15	(Colombia) Jorge Carrascal
AM	10	(Uruguay) Giorgian de Arrascaeta	(yellow card) 25'	(substituted off) 80'
LW	16	(Brazil) Samuel Lino		(substituted off) 68'
CF	27	(Brazil) Bruno Henrique (c)		(substituted off) 85'
Substitutes:
GK	25	(Brazil) Matheus Cunha
DF	3	(Brazil) Léo Ortiz
DF	6	(Brazil) Ayrton Lucas
DF	22	(Brazil) Emerson Royal
MF	8	(Spain) Saúl
MF	18	(Uruguay) Nicolás de la Cruz
MF	52	(Brazil) Evertton Araújo
FW	7	(Brazil) Luiz Araújo		(substituted on) 80'
FW	11	(Brazil) Everton		(substituted on) 68'
FW	23	(Brazil) Juninho		(substituted on) 85'
FW	30	(Brazil) Michael
FW	64	(Brazil) Wallace Yan
Manager:
(Brazil) Filipe Luís

Assistant referees:
Cristian Navarro (Argentina)
José Miguel Savorani (Argentina)
Fourth official:
Nicolás Ramírez (Argentina)
Fifth official:
Martín Soppi (Uruguay)
Video assistant referee:
Héctor Paletta (Argentina)
Assistant video assistant referees:
Santiago Fernández (Uruguay)
Jorge Baliño (Argentina)
Christian Ferreyra (Uruguay)

**Match rules**
- 90 minutes.
- 30 minutes of extra time if necessary.
- Penalty shoot-out if scores still level.
- Twelve named substitutes.
- Maximum of five substitutions, with a sixth allowed in extra time.

== See also ==
- 2025 Copa Sudamericana final
