= 2025 Copa Libertadores group stage =

The 2025 Copa Libertadores group stage was played from 1 April to 29 May 2025. A total of 32 teams competed in the group stage to decide the 16 places in the final stages of the 2025 Copa Libertadores.

== Draw ==
The draw for the group stage was held on 17 March 2025, 20:00 PYT (UTC−3), at the CONMEBOL Convention Centre in Luque, Paraguay.

Teams were seeded by their CONMEBOL Clubs ranking as of 16 December 2024 (shown in parentheses), taking into account the following three factors:

1. Performance in the last 10 years, taking into account Copa Libertadores and Copa Sudamericana results in the period 2015–2024.
2. Historical coefficient, taking into account Copa Libertadores and Copa Sudamericana results in the period 1960–2014 and 2002–2014 respectively.
3. Local tournament champion, with bonus points awarded to domestic league champions of the last 10 years.

For the group stage, the 32 teams were drawn into eight groups (Groups A–H) of four containing a team from each of the four pots. Teams from the same association could not be drawn into the same group, excluding the four winners of the third stage, which were allocated to Pot 4 and could be drawn into the same group with another team from the same association.

Group stage draw
Pot 1	Pot 2	Pot 3	Pot 4
(Brazil) Botafogo (21); (Argentina) River Plate (1); (Brazil) Palmeiras (2); (Brazil) Flamengo (4); (Uruguay) Peñarol (5); (Uruguay) Nacional (6); (Brazil) São Paulo (8); (Argentina) Racing (12)	(Paraguay) Olimpia (13); (Ecuador) LDU Quito (14); (Brazil) Internacional (15); (Paraguay) Libertad (16); (Ecuador) Independiente del Valle (17); (Chile) Colo-Colo (23); (Argentina) Estudiantes (24); (Bolivia) Bolívar (27)	(Colombia) Atlético Nacional (28); (Argentina) Vélez Sarsfield (29); (Brazil) Fortaleza (37); (Peru) Sporting Cristal (38); (Peru) Universitario (41); (Argentina) Talleres (46); (Venezuela) Deportivo Táchira (49); Universidad de Chile (57)	(Venezuela) Carabobo (173); (Colombia) Atlético Bucaramanga (198); (Argentina) Central Córdoba (No rank); (Bolivia) San Antonio Bulo Bulo (No rank); (Peru) Alianza Lima (50); (Brazil) Bahia (77); (Paraguay) Cerro Porteño (20); (Ecuador) Barcelona (25)

Notes

1. ^{TH} The defending Copa Libertadores champions were automatically allocated to Group A and the position A1.
2. ^{CS} The defending Copa Sudamericana champions (normally seeded in Pot 2) were seeded in Pot 1 due to their CONMEBOL Clubs rank.
3. ^{Q3} The third stage winners were seeded in Pot 4.

The following are the four winners of the third stage of qualifying which joined the 28 direct entrants in the group stage.

Match	Third stage winners
G1	(Peru) Alianza Lima
G2	(Brazil) Bahia
G3	(Paraguay) Cerro Porteño
G4	(Ecuador) Barcelona

== Format ==
In the group stage, each group was played on a home-and-away round-robin basis. Teams were ranked according to the following criteria: 1. Points (3 points for a win, 1 point for a draw, and 0 points for a loss); 2. Goal difference; 3. Goals scored; 4. Away goals scored; 5. CONMEBOL ranking (Regulations Article 2.4.2).

The winners and runners-up of each group advanced to the round of 16 of the final stages. The third-placed teams of each group entered the knockout round play-offs of the 2025 Copa Sudamericana.

== Schedule ==
The schedule of each matchday was as follows (Regulations Article 2.2.2).

Matchday	Dates	Matches
Matchday 1	1–3 April 2025	Team 4 vs. Team 2, Team 3 vs. Team 1
Matchday 2	8–10 April 2025	Team 2 vs. Team 3, Team 1 vs. Team 4
Matchday 3	22–24 April 2025	Team 2 vs. Team 1, Team 4 vs. Team 3
Matchday 4	6–8 May 2025	Team 3 vs. Team 2, Team 4 vs. Team 1
Matchday 5	13–15 May 2025	Team 1 vs. Team 2, Team 3 vs. Team 4
Matchday 6	27–29 May 2025	Team 1 vs. Team 3, Team 2 vs. Team 4

== Groups ==
=== Group A ===
Pos	Team	Pld	W	D	L	GF	GA	GD	Pts	Qualification	EST	BOT	UCH	CBO
1	(Argentina) Estudiantes	6	4	0	2	11	5	+6	12	Advance to round of 16	—	1–0	1–2	2–0
2	(Brazil) Botafogo	6	4	0	2	8	5	+3	12	Advance to round of 16	3–2	—	1–0	2–0
3	Universidad de Chile	6	3	1	2	8	6	+2	10	Transfer to Copa Sudamericana	0–3	1–0	—	4–0
4	(Venezuela) Carabobo	6	0	1	5	2	13	−11	1		0–2	1–2	1–1	—

Source: CONMEBOL
1 April 2025
18:00 UTC−4

Carabobo (Venezuela)	0–2	(Argentina) Estudiantes
	Report	Núñez 45'; Ascacíbar 73' (pen.)

Estadio Misael Delgado, Valencia
Attendance: 5,372
Referee: Jhon Ospina (Colombia)
2 April 2025
21:30 UTC−3

Universidad de Chile	1–0	(Brazil) Botafogo
Di Yorio 59'	Report

Estadio Nacional Julio Martínez Prádanos, Santiago
Attendance: 43,316
Referee: Esteban Ostojich (Uruguay)

8 April 2025
19:00 UTC−3

Botafogo (Brazil)	2–0	(Venezuela) Carabobo
Patrick 88'; Martins 90+8'	Report

Estádio Olímpico Nilton Santos, Rio de Janeiro
Attendance: 24,372
Referee: Guillermo Guerrero (Ecuador)
8 April 2025
21:30 UTC−3

Estudiantes (Argentina)	1–2	Universidad de Chile
Piovi 3'	Report	Aránguiz 7' (pen.); Zaldivia 10'

Estadio Jorge Luis Hirschi, La Plata
Attendance: 21,954
Referee: Derlis López (Paraguay)

22 April 2025
19:00 UTC−4 (Note: The Carabobo v Universidad de Chile match, scheduled to be played at 18:00 local time, was delayed for one hour due to heavy rainfall.)

Carabobo (Venezuela)	1–1	Universidad de Chile
Tortolero 22' (pen.)	Report	Aránguiz 43' (pen.)

Estadio Misael Delgado, Valencia
Attendance: 4,012
Referee: Carlos Ortega (Colombia)
23 April 2025
21:30 UTC−3

Estudiantes (Argentina)	1–0	(Brazil) Botafogo
Carrillo 38'	Report

Estadio Jorge Luis Hirschi, La Plata
Attendance: 20,544
Referee: Gustavo Tejera (Uruguay)

6 May 2025
18:00 UTC−4

Carabobo (Venezuela)	1–2	(Brazil) Botafogo
Aponte 76'	Report	Vitinho 22'; Cuiabano 90+1'

Estadio Misael Delgado, Valencia
Attendance: 4,496
Referee: Carlos Benítez (Paraguay)
7 May 2025
20:00 UTC−4

Universidad de Chile	0–3	(Argentina) Estudiantes
	Report	Palacios 22'; Ascacíbar 31'; Carrillo 39'

Estadio Nacional Julio Martínez Prádanos, Santiago
Attendance: 43,772
Referee: Andrés Rojas (Colombia)

13 May 2025
20:30 UTC−4

Universidad de Chile	4–0	(Venezuela) Carabobo
Sepúlveda 30'; Aránguiz 65' (pen.); Zaldivia 81'; Poblete 90'	Report

Estadio Nacional Julio Martínez Prádanos, Santiago
Attendance: 45,000
Referee: Bryan Loayza (Ecuador)
14 May 2025
21:30 UTC−3

Botafogo (Brazil)	3–2	(Argentina) Estudiantes
Rwan 42'; Igor Jesus 52'; Artur 85'	Report	Palacios 64' (pen.), 77'

Estádio Olímpico Nilton Santos, Rio de Janeiro
Attendance: 26,613
Referee: Juan Benítez (Paraguay)

27 May 2025
21:30 UTC−3

Botafogo (Brazil)	1–0	Universidad de Chile
Igor Jesus 38'	Report

Estádio Olímpico Nilton Santos, Rio de Janeiro
Attendance: 36,342
Referee: Andrés Rojas (Colombia)
27 May 2025
21:30 UTC−3

Estudiantes (Argentina)	2–0	(Venezuela) Carabobo
Cetré 10'; Giménez 24'	Report

Estadio Jorge Luis Hirschi, La Plata
Attendance: 20,364
Referee: Augusto Menéndez (Peru)

=== Group B ===
Pos	Team	Pld	W	D	L	GF	GA	GD	Pts	Qualification	RIV	UNI	IDV	BSC
1	(Argentina) River Plate	6	3	3	0	13	7	+6	12	Advance to round of 16	—	1–1	6–2	0–0
2	(Peru) Universitario	6	2	2	2	4	4	0	8	Advance to round of 16	0–1	—	1–1	1–0
3	(Ecuador) Independiente del Valle	6	2	2	2	8	11	−3	8	Transfer to Copa Sudamericana	2–2	1–0	—	2–1
4	(Ecuador) Barcelona	6	1	1	4	4	7	−3	4		2–3	0–1	1–0	—

Source: CONMEBOL
1 April 2025
21:00 UTC−5

Barcelona (Ecuador)	1–0	(Ecuador) Independiente del Valle
Carabalí 5'	Report

Estadio Monumental Isidro Romero Carbo, Guayaquil
Attendance: 20,128
Referee: Wilton Sampaio (Brazil)
2 April 2025
19:30 UTC−5

Universitario (Peru)	0–1	(Argentina) River Plate
	Report	Díaz 17'

Estadio Monumental, Lima
Attendance: 56,858
Referee: Gustavo Tejera (Uruguay)

8 April 2025
21:30 UTC−3

River Plate (Argentina)	0–0	(Ecuador) Barcelona
	Report

Estadio Monumental, Buenos Aires
Attendance: 0 (Note: River Plate played their home match against Barcelona behind closed doors as they were punished for the use of pyrotechnics by their fans in their 2024 Copa Libertadores semi-final match against Atlético Mineiro.)
Referee: Raphael Claus (Brazil)
8 April 2025
21:00 UTC−5

Independiente del Valle (Ecuador)	1–0	(Peru) Universitario
Alcívar 82'	Report

Estadio Banco Guayaquil, Quito
Attendance: 2,480
Referee: Jhon Ospina (Colombia)

22 April 2025
21:00 UTC−5

Barcelona (Ecuador)	0–1	(Peru) Universitario
	Report	E. Flores 31'

Estadio Monumental Isidro Romero Carbo, Guayaquil
Attendance: 23,422
Referee: Carlos Benítez (Paraguay)
23 April 2025 (Note: The Independiente del Valle v River Plate match, originally scheduled for 24 April 2025, 19:30 local time, was rescheduled to 23 April 2025 at River Plate's request.)
19:30 UTC−5

Independiente del Valle (Ecuador)	2–2	(Argentina) River Plate
Spinelli 24', 30'	Report	Galoppo 68'; Driussi 74'

Estadio Banco Guayaquil, Quito
Attendance: 6,411
Referee: Piero Maza (Chile)

8 May 2025
19:30 UTC−5

Barcelona (Ecuador)	2–3	(Argentina) River Plate
Rivero 15'; Martínez Quarta 49' (o.g.)	Report	Driussi 7'; Colidio 26'; Mastantuono 48'

Estadio Monumental Isidro Romero Carbo, Guayaquil
Attendance: 35,164
Referee: Wilmar Roldán (Colombia)
8 May 2025
21:00 UTC−5

Universitario (Peru)	1–1	(Ecuador) Independiente del Valle
Carabalí 34'	Report	Spinelli 28'

Estadio Monumental, Lima
Attendance: 45,887
Referee: Paulo Zanovelli (Brazil)

14 May 2025
21:00 UTC−5

Universitario (Peru)	1–0	(Ecuador) Barcelona
Valera 45+1'	Report

Estadio Monumental, Lima
Attendance: 40,795
Referee: Andrés Matonte (Uruguay)
15 May 2025
21:30 UTC−3

River Plate (Argentina)	6–2	(Ecuador) Independiente del Valle
Driussi 7'; Zárate 25' (o.g.); Mastantuono 45+5' (pen.); Meza 51'; Borja 88'; Lanzini 90+4'	Report	Hoyos 11'; Spinelli 21'

Estadio Monumental, Buenos Aires
Attendance: 60,635
Referee: Jesús Valenzuela (Venezuela)

27 May 2025
21:30 UTC−3

River Plate (Argentina)	1–1	(Peru) Universitario
Colidio 36'	Report	Concha 45+2'

Estadio Monumental, Buenos Aires
Attendance: 65,519
Referee: Raphael Claus (Brazil)
27 May 2025
19:30 UTC−5

Independiente del Valle (Ecuador)	2–1	(Ecuador) Barcelona
Mercado 64'; Re. Ibarra 69'	Report	Caicedo 24'

Estadio Banco Guayaquil, Quito
Attendance: 6,256
Referee: Cristian Garay (Chile)

=== Group C ===
Pos	Team	Pld	W	D	L	GF	GA	GD	Pts	Qualification	LDQ	FLA	CCO	TAC
1	(Ecuador) LDU Quito	6	3	2	1	8	4	+4	11	Advance to round of 16	—	0–0	3–0	2–0
2	(Brazil) Flamengo	6	3	2	1	6	3	+3	11	Advance to round of 16	2–0	—	1–2	1–0
3	(Argentina) Central Córdoba	6	3	2	1	7	7	0	11	Transfer to Copa Sudamericana	0–0	1–1	—	2–1
4	(Venezuela) Deportivo Táchira	6	0	0	6	4	11	−7	0		2–3	0–1	1–2	—

Source: CONMEBOL
3 April 2025
19:00 UTC−3

Central Córdoba (Argentina)	0–0	(Ecuador) LDU Quito
	Report

Estadio Único Madre de Ciudades, Santiago del Estero (Note: Central Córdoba played their home matches at Estadio Único Madre de Ciudades, Santiago del Estero instead of their regular stadium Estadio Alfredo Terrera, Santiago del Estero.)
Attendance: 12,132
Referee: Leodán González (Uruguay)
3 April 2025
20:30 UTC−4

Deportivo Táchira (Venezuela)	0–1	(Brazil) Flamengo
	Report	Juninho 57'

Estadio Polideportivo de Pueblo Nuevo, San Cristóbal
Attendance: 18,138
Referee: Gery Vargas (Bolivia)

9 April 2025
21:30 UTC−3

Flamengo (Brazil)	1–2	(Argentina) Central Córdoba
De la Cruz 60'	Report	Heredia 24' (pen.); Florentín 44'

Estádio do Maracanã, Rio de Janeiro
Attendance: 56,515
Referee: Cristian Garay (Chile)
9 April 2025
21:00 UTC−5

LDU Quito (Ecuador)	2–0	(Venezuela) Deportivo Táchira
Arce 73', 83'	Report

Estadio Rodrigo Paz Delgado, Quito
Attendance: 12,499
Referee: Joel Alarcón (Peru)

22 April 2025
17:00 UTC−5

LDU Quito (Ecuador)	0–0	(Brazil) Flamengo
	Report

Estadio Rodrigo Paz Delgado, Quito
Attendance: 17,883
Referee: Derlis López (Paraguay)
24 April 2025
19:00 UTC−3

Central Córdoba (Argentina)	2–1	(Venezuela) Deportivo Táchira
Angulo 4'; Quagliata 19'	Report	Requena 37'

Estadio Único Madre de Ciudades, Santiago del Estero
Attendance: 11,824
Referee: Jhon Ospina (Colombia)

7 May 2025
18:00 UTC−4

Deportivo Táchira (Venezuela)	2–3	(Ecuador) LDU Quito
Hernández 67'; Castillo 90+5'	Report	Alzugaray 16'; Arce 19', 54'

Estadio Polideportivo de Pueblo Nuevo, San Cristóbal
Attendance: 7,009
Referee: Gery Vargas (Bolivia)
7 May 2025
21:30 UTC−3

Central Córdoba (Argentina)	1–1	(Brazil) Flamengo
Verón 61'	Report	De Arrascaeta 10'

Estadio Único Madre de Ciudades, Santiago del Estero
Attendance: 19,969
Referee: Felipe González (Chile)

13 May 2025
18:00 UTC−4

Deportivo Táchira (Venezuela)	1–2	(Argentina) Central Córdoba
Castillo 75'	Report	Galván 20'; Verón 76'

Estadio Polideportivo de Pueblo Nuevo, San Cristóbal
Attendance: 3,909
Referee: Mathías de Armas (Uruguay)
15 May 2025
21:30 UTC−3

Flamengo (Brazil)	2–0	(Ecuador) LDU Quito
Léo Ortiz 10'; Luiz Araújo 54'	Report

Estádio do Maracanã, Rio de Janeiro
Attendance: 65,831
Referee: Andrés Rojas (Colombia)

28 May 2025
21:30 UTC−3

Flamengo (Brazil)	1–0	(Venezuela) Deportivo Táchira
Léo Pereira 66'	Report

Estádio do Maracanã, Rio de Janeiro
Attendance: 66,082
Referee: Carlos Ortega (Colombia)
28 May 2025
19:30 UTC−5

LDU Quito (Ecuador)	3–0	(Argentina) Central Córdoba
Alvarado 15'; Alzugaray 44', 53'	Report

Estadio Rodrigo Paz Delgado, Quito
Attendance: 17,616
Referee: Felipe González (Chile)

=== Group D ===
Pos	Team	Pld	W	D	L	GF	GA	GD	Pts	Qualification	SPA	LIB	ALI	TAL
1	(Brazil) São Paulo	6	4	2	0	10	4	+6	14	Advance to round of 16	—	1–1	2–2	2–1
2	(Paraguay) Libertad	6	2	3	1	6	5	+1	9	Advance to round of 16	0–2	—	2–2	2–0
3	(Peru) Alianza Lima	6	1	2	3	7	11	−4	5	Transfer to Copa Sudamericana	0–2	0–1	—	3–2
4	(Argentina) Talleres	6	1	1	4	5	8	−3	4		0–1	0–0	2–0	—

Source: CONMEBOL
1 April 2025
21:00 UTC−5

Alianza Lima (Peru)	0–1	(Paraguay) Libertad
	Report	Aguilar 52'

Estadio Alejandro Villanueva, Lima
Attendance: 25,376
Referee: Wilmar Roldán (Colombia)
2 April 2025
21:30 UTC−3

Talleres (Argentina)	0–1	(Brazil) São Paulo
	Report	Alisson 76'

Estadio Mario Alberto Kempes, Córdoba
Attendance: 28,991
Referee: Felipe González (Chile)

8 April 2025
19:00 UTC−3

Libertad (Paraguay)	2–0	(Argentina) Talleres
Franco 9'; Alcaraz 57'	Report

Estadio La Huerta, Asunción
Attendance: 5,005
Referee: Esteban Ostojich (Uruguay)
10 April 2025
21:30 UTC−3

São Paulo (Brazil)	2–2	(Peru) Alianza Lima
Ferreira 32', 37'	Report	E. Castillo 66'; Quevedo 76'

Estádio do Morumbi, São Paulo
Attendance: 49,938
Referee: Alexis Herrera (Venezuela)

22 April 2025
17:00 UTC−5 (Note: The Alianza Lima v Talleres match, originally scheduled for 22 April 2025, 19:30 local time, was rescheduled to 17:00 local time.)

Alianza Lima (Peru)	3–2	(Argentina) Talleres
Guerrero 11', 57'; Barcos 90+5'	Report	Girotti 64' (pen.), 69'

Estadio Alejandro Villanueva, Lima
Attendance: 24,553
Referee: Andrés Rojas (Colombia)
23 April 2025
21:30 UTC−3

Libertad (Paraguay)	0–2	(Brazil) São Paulo
	Report	Lucas Ferreira 62'; André Silva 83'

Estadio La Huerta, Asunción
Attendance: 4,718
Referee: Cristian Garay (Chile)

6 May 2025
17:00 UTC−5

Alianza Lima (Peru)	0–2	(Brazil) São Paulo
	Report	André Silva 35', 89'

Estadio Alejandro Villanueva, Lima
Attendance: 25,208
Referee: Andrés Matonte (Uruguay)
8 May 2025
19:00 UTC−3

Talleres (Argentina)	0–0	(Paraguay) Libertad
	Report

Estadio Mario Alberto Kempes, Córdoba
Attendance: 25,028
Referee: Gustavo Tejera (Uruguay)

14 May 2025
21:30 UTC−3

São Paulo (Brazil)	1–1	(Paraguay) Libertad
Lucca 90'	Report	Aguilar 74'

Estádio do Morumbi, São Paulo
Attendance: 46,996
Referee: Carlos Betancur (Colombia)
15 May 2025
19:00 UTC−3

Talleres (Argentina)	2–0	(Peru) Alianza Lima
Botta 23'; Depietri 38'	Report

Estadio Mario Alberto Kempes, Córdoba
Attendance: 25,046
Referee: Gery Vargas (Bolivia)

27 May 2025
19:00 UTC−3

São Paulo (Brazil)	2–1	(Argentina) Talleres
Sabino 26'; Luciano 84'	Report	Girotti 39'

Estádio do Morumbi, São Paulo
Attendance: 35,102
Referee: Piero Maza (Chile)
27 May 2025
19:30 UTC−3 (Note: The Libertad v Alianza Lima match, scheduled to be played at 19:00 local time, was delayed for 30 minutes due to heavy rainfall.)

Libertad (Paraguay)	2–2	(Peru) Alianza Lima
Ó. Cardozo 45+5' (pen.); Ramírez 63'	Report	Guerrero 28'; E. Castillo 42'

Estadio La Huerta, Asunción
Attendance: 2,567
Referee: Esteban Ostojich (Uruguay)

=== Group E ===
Pos	Team	Pld	W	D	L	GF	GA	GD	Pts	Qualification	RAC	FOR	BUC	CLC
1	(Argentina) Racing	6	4	1	1	14	3	+11	13	Advance to round of 16	—	1–0	1–2	4–0
2	(Brazil) Fortaleza	6	2	2	2	8	5	+3	8	Advance to round of 16	0–3	—	0–0	4–0
3	(Colombia) Atlético Bucaramanga	6	1	3	2	6	10	−4	6	Transfer to Copa Sudamericana	0–4	1–1	—	3–3
4	(Chile) Colo-Colo	6	1	2	3	5	15	−10	5		1–1	0–3 (Note: The Colo-Colo v Fortaleza match was suspended at 0–0 in the 68th minute of play after Colo-Colo fans invaded the pitch following the passing of two fellow supporters in an incident prior to the start of the match. After a one-hour wait, CONMEBOL announced the abandonment of the match and referred the matter to its Disciplinary Commission, which subsequently awarded Fortaleza a 3–0 win.)	1–0	—

Source: CONMEBOL
Notes:
1 April 2025
19:30 UTC−5

Atlético Bucaramanga (Colombia)	3–3	(Chile) Colo-Colo
Londoño 9'; Pons 24'; Henao 57'	Report	Correa 38' (pen.), 84'; Isla 63'

Estadio Américo Montanini, Bucaramanga
Attendance: 21,307
Referee: Carlos Benítez (Paraguay)
1 April 2025
21:30 UTC−3

Fortaleza (Brazil)	0–3	(Argentina) Racing
	Report	Salas 26'; Almendra 48'; Sosa 84'

Castelão, Fortaleza
Attendance: 40,413
Referee: Juan Benítez (Paraguay)

10 April 2025
19:00 UTC−3

Racing (Argentina)	1–2	(Colombia) Atlético Bucaramanga
Barrios 90+2'	Report	Pons 54'; Sambueza 64'

El Cilindro, Avellaneda
Attendance: 0 (Note: Racing played their home match against Atlético Bucaramanga behind closed doors as they were punished for the use of pyrotechnics by their fans in their 2024 Copa Sudamericana semi-final match against Corinthians.)
Referee: Andrés Matonte (Uruguay)
10 April 2025
20:00 UTC−4

Colo-Colo (Chile)	0–3 Awarded (Note: The Colo-Colo v Fortaleza match was suspended at 0–0 in the 68th minute of play after Colo-Colo fans invaded the pitch following the passing of two fellow supporters in an incident prior to the start of the match. After a one-hour wait, CONMEBOL announced the abandonment of the match, referring the matter to its Disciplinary Commission. On 30 April 2025, CONMEBOL's Disciplinary Commission awarded Fortaleza a 3–0 win.)	(Brazil) Fortaleza
	Report

Estadio Monumental David Arellano, Santiago
Referee: Gustavo Tejera (Uruguay)

22 April 2025
20:30 UTC−4

Colo-Colo (Chile)	1–1	(Argentina) Racing
Cepeda 9'	Report	Barrios 86'

Estadio Monumental David Arellano, Santiago
Attendance: 0 (Note: Colo-Colo played their home matches against Racing and Atlético Bucaramanga behind closed doors as they were punished for the incidents in their match against Fortaleza.)
Referee: Juan Benítez (Paraguay)
23 April 2025
21:00 UTC−5

Atlético Bucaramanga (Colombia)	1–1	(Brazil) Fortaleza
Pons 89' (pen.)	Report	Deyverson 19'

Estadio Américo Montanini, Bucaramanga
Referee: Kevin Ortega (Peru)

6 May 2025
17:00 UTC−5

Atlético Bucaramanga (Colombia)	0–4	(Argentina) Racing
	Report	Martínez 4'; Solari 56'; Sosa 69'; Barrios 90+4'

Estadio Américo Montanini, Bucaramanga
Attendance: 21,496
Referee: Augusto Aragón (Ecuador)
6 May 2025
21:30 UTC−3

Fortaleza (Brazil)	4–0	(Chile) Colo-Colo
Breno Lopes 25'; Marinho 30'; Deyverson 39'; Lucero 84'	Report

Castelão, Fortaleza
Attendance: 30,902
Referee: Jesús Valenzuela (Venezuela)

13 May 2025
21:30 UTC−3

Fortaleza (Brazil)	0–0	(Colombia) Atlético Bucaramanga
	Report

Castelão, Fortaleza
Attendance: 40,279
Referee: Derlis López (Paraguay)
14 May 2025
21:30 UTC−3

Racing (Argentina)	4–0	(Chile) Colo-Colo
Martínez 36', 45+1'; Solari 51'; Balboa 81'	Report

El Cilindro, Avellaneda
Attendance: 24,217
Referee: Gustavo Tejera (Uruguay)

29 May 2025
21:30 UTC−3

Racing (Argentina)	1–0	(Brazil) Fortaleza
Martínez 90+4'	Report

El Cilindro, Avellaneda
Attendance: 22,141
Referee: Alexis Herrera (Venezuela)
29 May 2025
20:30 UTC−4

Colo-Colo (Chile)	1–0	(Colombia) Atlético Bucaramanga
Correa 26'	Report

Estadio Monumental David Arellano, Santiago
Attendance: 0
Referee: Kevin Ortega (Peru)

=== Group F ===
Pos	Team	Pld	W	D	L	GF	GA	GD	Pts	Qualification	INT	ATN	BAH	NAC
1	(Brazil) Internacional	6	3	2	1	12	8	+4	11	Advance to round of 16	—	3–0	2–1	3–3
2	(Colombia) Atlético Nacional	6	3	0	3	7	6	+1	9	Advance to round of 16	3–1	—	1–0	3–0
3	(Brazil) Bahia	6	2	1	3	5	7	−2	7	Transfer to Copa Sudamericana	1–1	1–0	—	1–3
4	(Uruguay) Nacional	6	2	1	3	7	10	−3	7		0–2	1–0	0–1	—

Source: CONMEBOL
2 April 2025
21:00 UTC−5

Atlético Nacional (Colombia)	3–0	(Uruguay) Nacional
Hinestroza 45+2'; Viveros 55'; Morelos 72'	Report

Estadio Atanasio Girardot, Medellín
Attendance: 40,083
Referee: Yael Falcón Pérez (Argentina)
3 April 2025
19:00 UTC−3

Bahia (Brazil)	1–1	(Brazil) Internacional
Jean Lucas 73'	Report	Valencia 84'

Arena Fonte Nova, Salvador
Attendance: 42,700
Referee: Piero Maza (Chile)

9 April 2025
19:00 UTC−3

Nacional (Uruguay)	0–1	(Brazil) Bahia
	Report	Erick Pulga 64'

Estadio Gran Parque Central, Montevideo
Attendance: 30,559
Referee: Darío Herrera (Argentina)
10 April 2025
19:00 UTC−3

Internacional (Brazil)	3–0	(Colombia) Atlético Nacional
Alan Patrick 50' (pen.), 82' (pen.), 88'	Report

Estádio Beira-Rio, Porto Alegre
Attendance: 42,804
Referee: Felipe González (Chile)

22 April 2025
21:30 UTC−3

Internacional (Brazil)	3–3	(Uruguay) Nacional
Alan Patrick 45+1'; Bernabei 67'; Fernando 73'	Report	Millán 6'; Boggio 10'; Coates 43'

Estádio Beira-Rio, Porto Alegre
Attendance: 37,492
Referee: Alexis Herrera (Venezuela)
24 April 2025
21:00 UTC−3

Bahia (Brazil)	1–0	(Colombia) Atlético Nacional
Willian José 71'	Report

Arena Fonte Nova, Salvador
Attendance: 40,790
Referee: Mario Díaz de Vivar (Paraguay)

7 May 2025
19:00 UTC−3

Bahia (Brazil)	1–3	(Uruguay) Nacional
Jean Lucas 47'	Report	Morales 57'; Ni. López 69'; Millán 86'

Arena Fonte Nova, Salvador
Attendance: 43,419
Referee: Yael Falcón Pérez (Argentina)
8 May 2025
19:30 UTC−5

Atlético Nacional (Colombia)	3–1	(Brazil) Internacional
Viveros 39', 90+3'; Arce 55'	Report	Alan Patrick 80' (pen.)

Estadio Atanasio Girardot, Medellín
Attendance: 41,006
Referee: Facundo Tello (Argentina)

14 May 2025
17:00 UTC−5

Atlético Nacional (Colombia)	1–0	(Brazil) Bahia
Viveros 46'	Report

Estadio Atanasio Girardot, Medellín
Attendance: 44,166
Referee: Darío Herrera (Argentina)
15 May 2025
19:00 UTC−3

Nacional (Uruguay)	0–2	(Brazil) Internacional
	Report	Ricardo Mathias 45'; Aguirre 90+7'

Estadio Gran Parque Central, Montevideo
Attendance: 27,984
Referee: Piero Maza (Chile)

28 May 2025
19:00 UTC−3

Nacional (Uruguay)	1–0	(Colombia) Atlético Nacional
Oliva 88'	Report

Estadio Gran Parque Central, Montevideo
Attendance: 22,978
Referee: Maximiliano Ramírez (Argentina)
28 May 2025
19:00 UTC−3

Internacional (Brazil)	2–1	(Brazil) Bahia
Vitinho 58'; Borré 77'	Report	Jean Lucas 54'

Estádio Beira-Rio, Porto Alegre
Attendance: 33,712
Referee: Facundo Tello (Argentina)

=== Group G ===
Pos	Team	Pld	W	D	L	GF	GA	GD	Pts	Qualification	PAL	CCP	BOL	CRI
1	(Brazil) Palmeiras	6	6	0	0	17	4	+13	18	Advance to round of 16	—	1–0	2–0	6–0
2	(Paraguay) Cerro Porteño	6	2	1	3	7	11	−4	7	Advance to round of 16	0–2	—	4–2	2–2
3	(Bolivia) Bolívar	6	2	0	4	12	11	+1	6	Transfer to Copa Sudamericana	2–3	4–0	—	3–0
4	(Peru) Sporting Cristal	6	1	1	4	6	16	−10	4		2–3	0–1	2–1	—

Source: CONMEBOL
1 April 2025
19:00 UTC−3

Cerro Porteño (Paraguay)	4–2	(Bolivia) Bolívar
Torres 45+3', 47', 61'; Morel 72'	Report	R. Vaca 17', 89'

Estadio General Pablo Rojas, Asunción
Attendance: 15,997
Referee: Alexis Herrera (Venezuela)
3 April 2025
17:00 UTC−5

Sporting Cristal (Peru)	2–3	(Brazil) Palmeiras
Pretell 67'; Távara 83'	Report	Estêvão 38'; Piquerez 82' (pen.); Ríos 90+2'

Estadio Nacional, Lima (Note: Sporting Cristal played their home matches at Estadio Nacional, Lima instead of their regular stadium Estadio Alberto Gallardo, Lima which did not meet CONMEBOL requirements.)
Attendance: 16,286
Referee: Darío Herrera (Argentina)

9 April 2025
20:30 UTC−4

Bolívar (Bolivia)	3–0	(Peru) Sporting Cristal
Gomes 12' (pen.); R. Vaca 44', 58'	Report

Estadio Hernando Siles, La Paz
Referee: Maximiliano Ramírez (Argentina)
9 April 2025
21:30 UTC−3

Palmeiras (Brazil)	1–0	(Paraguay) Cerro Porteño
Ríos 41'	Report

Allianz Parque, São Paulo
Attendance: 24,530
Referee: Andrés Rojas (Colombia)

24 April 2025
18:00 UTC−4

Bolívar (Bolivia)	2–3	(Brazil) Palmeiras
Gomes 56', 69'	Report	López 19'; Estêvão 45'; Maurício 73'

Estadio Hernando Siles, La Paz
Attendance: 13,839
Referee: Yael Falcón Pérez (Argentina)
24 April 2025
21:30 UTC−3

Cerro Porteño (Paraguay)	2–2	(Peru) Sporting Cristal
Domínguez 42'; Carrizo 44'	Report	González 37'; Lutiger 90+2'

Estadio General Pablo Rojas, Asunción
Attendance: 18,016
Referee: Esteban Ostojich (Uruguay)

7 May 2025
21:30 UTC−3

Cerro Porteño (Paraguay)	0–2	(Brazil) Palmeiras
	Report	Estêvão 41'; Vitor Roque 90+4'

Estadio General Pablo Rojas, Asunción
Attendance: 16,590
Referee: Piero Maza (Chile)
7 May 2025
21:00 UTC−5

Sporting Cristal (Peru)	2–1	(Bolivia) Bolívar
Cauteruccio 5', 48'	Report	R. Vaca 73'

Estadio Nacional, Lima
Attendance: 15,647
Referee: Carlos Betancur (Colombia)

13 May 2025
19:30 UTC−5 (Note: The Sporting Cristal v Cerro Porteño match, originally scheduled at 21:00 local time, was moved up to 19:30 local time.)

Sporting Cristal (Peru)	0–1	(Paraguay) Cerro Porteño
	Report	Iturbe 14'

Estadio Nacional, Lima
Attendance: 31,514
Referee: Facundo Tello (Argentina)
15 May 2025
19:00 UTC−3

Palmeiras (Brazil)	2–0	(Bolivia) Bolívar
Murilo 6'; Torres 12'	Report

Allianz Parque, São Paulo
Attendance: 28,381
Referee: Maximiliano Ramírez (Argentina)

28 May 2025
21:30 UTC−3

Palmeiras (Brazil)	6–0	(Peru) Sporting Cristal
Estêvão 32'; López 39', 45+2'; Veiga 64'; Paulinho 71'; Torres 80'	Report

Allianz Parque, São Paulo
Attendance: 40,570
Referee: Wilmar Roldán (Colombia)
28 May 2025
20:30 UTC−4

Bolívar (Bolivia)	4–0	(Paraguay) Cerro Porteño
Romero 41'; Melgar 45+2'; Rodríguez 50'; Gomes 80'	Report

Estadio Hernando Siles, La Paz
Attendance: 8,202
Referee: Andrés Matonte (Uruguay)

=== Group H ===
Pos	Team	Pld	W	D	L	GF	GA	GD	Pts	Qualification	VEL	PEÑ	SAB	OLI
1	(Argentina) Vélez Sarsfield	6	3	2	1	11	4	+7	11	Advance to round of 16	—	2–1	3–0	1–1
2	(Uruguay) Peñarol	6	3	2	1	9	4	+5	11	Advance to round of 16	0–0	—	2–0	3–2
3	(Bolivia) San Antonio Bulo Bulo	6	2	0	4	5	15	−10	6	Transfer to Copa Sudamericana	2–1	0–3	—	3–2
4	(Paraguay) Olimpia	6	1	2	3	9	11	−2	5		0–4	0–0	4–0	—

Source: CONMEBOL
2 April 2025
18:00 UTC−4

San Antonio Bulo Bulo (Bolivia)	3–2	(Paraguay) Olimpia
Viveros 30'; Barboza 74'; Herrera 90+11' (pen.)	Report	H. A. Benítez 64'; Ortiz 79'

Estadio Félix Capriles, Cochabamba (Note: San Antonio Bulo Bulo played their home matches at Estadio Félix Capriles, Cochabamba instead of their regular stadium Estadio Dr. Carlos Villegas, Entre Ríos which did not meet CONMEBOL requirements.)
Attendance: 1,436
Referee: Kevin Ortega (Peru)
2 April 2025
19:00 UTC−3

Vélez Sarsfield (Argentina)	2–1	(Uruguay) Peñarol
Carrizo 80'; Montoro 90+5'	Report	Fernández 48'

Estadio José Amalfitani, Buenos Aires
Attendance: 20,108
Referee: Raphael Claus (Brazil)

8 April 2025
21:00 UTC−3

Peñarol (Uruguay)	2–0	(Bolivia) San Antonio Bulo Bulo
Villalba 60'; Machado 90+4'	Report

Estadio Campeón del Siglo, Montevideo
Attendance: 0 (Note: Peñarol played their home matches in the group stage behind closed doors as they were punished for incidents in their 2024 Copa Libertadores home matches against Flamengo and Botafogo.)
Referee: Paulo Zanovelli (Brazil)
9 April 2025
19:00 UTC−3

Olimpia (Paraguay)	0–4	(Argentina) Vélez Sarsfield
	Report	Romero 25', 49' (pen.); Carrizo 56'; Pizzini 90+3'

Estadio Defensores del Chaco, Asunción (Note: Olimpia played their home matches at Estadio Defensores del Chaco, Asunción instead of their regular stadium Estadio Osvaldo Domínguez Dibb, Asunción which is being rebuilt.)
Attendance: 19,422
Referee: Piero Maza (Chile)

23 April 2025
19:00 UTC−3

Olimpia (Paraguay)	0–0	(Uruguay) Peñarol
	Report

Estadio Defensores del Chaco, Asunción
Attendance: 19,869
Referee: Jesús Valenzuela (Venezuela)
23 April 2025
18:00 UTC−4

San Antonio Bulo Bulo (Bolivia)	2–1	(Argentina) Vélez Sarsfield
E. Gómez 26' (o.g.); Santos 86' (o.g.)	Report	Montoro 90'

Estadio Félix Capriles, Cochabamba
Attendance: 1,848
Referee: Wilton Sampaio (Brazil)

6 May 2025
22:00 UTC−4

San Antonio Bulo Bulo (Bolivia)	0–3	(Uruguay) Peñarol
	Report	Silvera 75', 90+5'; Hernández 90+2'

Estadio Félix Capriles, Cochabamba
Attendance: 2,725
Referee: Cristian Garay (Chile)
8 May 2025 (Note: The Vélez Sarsfield v Olimpia match, originally scheduled for 6 May 2025, 21:30 local time, was rescheduled to 8 May 2025, 19:00 local time.)
19:00 UTC−3

Vélez Sarsfield (Argentina)	1–1	(Paraguay) Olimpia
Carrizo 33'	Report	Fernández 90+2'

Estadio José Amalfitani, Buenos Aires
Attendance: 13,928
Referee: Raphael Claus (Brazil)

14 May 2025
19:00 UTC−3

Peñarol (Uruguay)	3–2	(Paraguay) Olimpia
Fernández 50'; Silvera 55'; Remedi 72'	Report	L. López 13'; Leguizamón 37'

Estadio Campeón del Siglo, Montevideo
Attendance: 0
Referee: Wilmar Roldán (Colombia)
14 May 2025
19:00 UTC−3

Vélez Sarsfield (Argentina)	3–0	(Bolivia) San Antonio Bulo Bulo
Carrizo 68' (pen.); Santos 79'; Montoro 90+4'	Report

Estadio José Amalfitani, Buenos Aires
Attendance: 16,715
Referee: Alexis Herrera (Venezuela)

29 May 2025
19:00 UTC−3

Peñarol (Uruguay)	0–0	(Argentina) Vélez Sarsfield
	Report

Estadio Campeón del Siglo, Montevideo
Attendance: 0
Referee: Anderson Daronco (Brazil)
29 May 2025
19:00 UTC−3

Olimpia (Paraguay)	4–0	(Bolivia) San Antonio Bulo Bulo
Redes 52'; Leguizamón 53'; González 56'; E. López 82'	Report

Estadio Defensores del Chaco, Asunción
Attendance: 2,117
Referee: Flavio de Souza (Brazil)
