= 2025 Copa Libertadores final stages =

The 2025 Copa Libertadores final stages were played from 12 August to 29 November 2025. A total of 16 teams competed in the final stages deciding the champions of the 2025 Copa Libertadores, with the final played at Estadio Monumental in Lima, Peru.

== Qualified teams ==
The winners and runners-up of each of the eight groups in the group stage advanced to the round of 16.

Group	Winners	Runners-up
A	(Argentina) Estudiantes	(Brazil) Botafogo
B	(Argentina) River Plate	(Peru) Universitario
C	(Ecuador) LDU Quito	(Brazil) Flamengo
D	(Brazil) São Paulo	(Paraguay) Libertad
E	(Argentina) Racing	(Brazil) Fortaleza
F	(Brazil) Internacional	(Colombia) Atlético Nacional
G	(Brazil) Palmeiras	(Paraguay) Cerro Porteño
H	(Argentina) Vélez Sarsfield	(Uruguay) Peñarol

=== Seeding ===
Starting from the round of 16, the teams were seeded according to their results in the group stage, with the group winners (Pot 1) seeded 1–8, and the group runners-up (Pot 2) seeded 9–16.

Seed	Grp	Team	Pld	W	D	L	GF	GA	GD	Pts	Round of 16 draw
1	G	(Brazil) Palmeiras	6	6	0	0	17	4	+13	18	Pot 1
2	D	(Brazil) São Paulo	6	4	2	0	10	4	+6	14	Pot 1
3	E	(Argentina) Racing	6	4	1	1	14	3	+11	13	Pot 1
4	B	(Argentina) River Plate	6	3	3	0	13	7	+6	12	Pot 1
5	A	(Argentina) Estudiantes	6	4	0	2	11	5	+6	12	Pot 1
6	H	(Argentina) Vélez Sarsfield	6	3	2	1	11	4	+7	11	Pot 1
7	F	(Brazil) Internacional	6	3	2	1	12	8	+4	11	Pot 1
8	C	(Ecuador) LDU Quito	6	3	2	1	8	4	+4	11	Pot 1
9	A	(Brazil) Botafogo	6	4	0	2	8	5	+3	12	Pot 2
10	H	(Uruguay) Peñarol	6	3	2	1	9	4	+5	11	Pot 2
11	C	(Brazil) Flamengo	6	3	2	1	6	3	+3	11	Pot 2
12	F	(Colombia) Atlético Nacional	6	3	0	3	7	6	+1	9	Pot 2
13	D	(Paraguay) Libertad	6	2	3	1	6	5	+1	9	Pot 2
14	E	(Brazil) Fortaleza	6	2	2	2	8	5	+3	8	Pot 2
15	B	(Peru) Universitario	6	2	2	2	4	4	0	8	Pot 2
16	G	(Paraguay) Cerro Porteño	6	2	1	3	7	11	−4	7	Pot 2

Source: CONMEBOL
Rules for classification: 1) Higher position in group; 2) Points; 3) Goal difference; 4) Goals scored; 5) Away goals scored; 6) CONMEBOL ranking (Regulations Article 2.4.2).

== Format ==
Starting from the round of 16, the teams played a single-elimination tournament with the following rules:

- In the round of 16, quarter-finals and semi-finals, each tie was played on a home-and-away two-legged basis, with the higher-seeded team hosting the second leg (Regulations Article 2.2.3.2). If tied on aggregate, extra time was not played, and a penalty shoot-out was used to determine the winners (Regulations Article 2.4.3).
- The final was played as a single match at a venue pre-selected by CONMEBOL, with the higher-seeded team designated as the "home" team for administrative purposes (Regulations Article 2.2.3.5). If tied after regulation, 30 minutes of extra time were played. If still tied after extra time, a penalty shoot-out was used to determine the winners (Regulations Article 2.4.4).

== Draw ==
The draw for the round of 16 was held on 2 June 2025, 12:00 PYT (UTC−3) at the CONMEBOL headquarters in Luque, Paraguay. For the round of 16, the 16 teams were drawn into eight ties (A–H) between a group winner (Pot 1) and a group runner-up (Pot 2), with the group winners hosting the second leg. Teams from the same association or the same group could be drawn into the same tie (Regulations Article 2.2.3.2).

== Bracket ==
The bracket starting from the round of 16 was determined as follows:

Round	Matchups
Round of 16	(Group winners host second leg, matchups decided by draw): Match A; Match B; Match C; Match D; Match E; Match F; Match G; Match H
Quarter-finals	(Higher-seeded team host second leg): Match S1: Winner A vs. Winner H; Match S2: Winner B vs. Winner G; Match S3: Winner C vs. Winner F; Match S4: Winner D vs. Winner E
Semi-finals	(Higher-seeded team host second leg): Match F1: Winner S1 vs. Winner S4; Match F2: Winner S2 vs. Winner S3
Final	(Higher-seeded team designated as "home" team): Winner F1 vs. Winner F2

The bracket was decided based on the round of 16 draw, which was held on 2 June 2025.

Round of 16
9	(Brazil) Botafogo	1	0	1
8	(Ecuador) LDU Quito	0	2	2
12	(Colombia) Atlético Nacional	0	1	1 (3)
2	(Brazil) São Paulo (p)	0	1	1 (4)
13	(Paraguay) Libertad	0	1	1 (1)
4	(Argentina) River Plate (p)	0	1	1 (3)
15	(Peru) Universitario	0	0	0
1	(Brazil) Palmeiras	4	0	4
11	(Brazil) Flamengo	1	2	3
7	(Brazil) Internacional	0	0	0
16	(Paraguay) Cerro Porteño	0	0	0
5	(Argentina) Estudiantes	1	0	1
14	(Brazil) Fortaleza	0	0	0
6	(Argentina) Vélez Sarsfield	0	2	2
10	(Uruguay) Peñarol	1	1	2
3	(Argentina) Racing	0	3	3

Quarter-finals
8	(Ecuador) LDU Quito	2	1	3
2	(Brazil) São Paulo	0	0	0
4	(Argentina) River Plate	1	1	2
1	(Brazil) Palmeiras	2	3	5
11	(Brazil) Flamengo (p)	2	0	2 (4)
5	(Argentina) Estudiantes	1	1	2 (2)
6	(Argentina) Vélez Sarsfield	0	0	0
3	(Argentina) Racing	1	1	2

Semi-finals
8	(Ecuador) LDU Quito	3	0	3
1	(Brazil) Palmeiras	0	4	4
11	(Brazil) Flamengo	1	0	1
3	(Argentina) Racing	0	0	0

Final
29 November – Lima
1	(Brazil) Palmeiras	0
11	(Brazil) Flamengo	1

== Round of 16 ==
=== Summary ===
The first legs were played on 12–14 August, and the second legs were played on 19–21 August 2025.

Team 1	Agg.	Team 2	1st leg	2nd leg
Atlético Nacional (Colombia)	1–1 (3–4 p)	(Brazil) São Paulo	0–0	1–1
Fortaleza (Brazil)	0–2	(Argentina) Vélez Sarsfield	0–0	0–2
Flamengo (Brazil)	3–0	(Brazil) Internacional	1–0	2–0
Universitario (Peru)	0–4	(Brazil) Palmeiras	0–4	0–0
Libertad (Paraguay)	1–1 (1–3 p)	(Argentina) River Plate	0–0	1–1
Cerro Porteño (Paraguay)	0–1	(Argentina) Estudiantes	0–1	0–0
Peñarol (Uruguay)	2–3	(Argentina) Racing	1–0	1–3
Botafogo (Brazil)	1–2	(Ecuador) LDU Quito	1–0	0–2

=== Matches ===
12 August 2025
19:30 UTC−5

Atlético Nacional (Colombia)	0–0	(Brazil) São Paulo
	Report

Estadio Atanasio Girardot, Medellín
Attendance: 40,048
Referee: Gustavo Tejera (Uruguay)
19 August 2025
21:30 UTC−3

São Paulo (Brazil)	1–1	(Colombia) Atlético Nacional
André Silva 3'	Report	Morelos 70' (pen.)
Penalties
Lucas Moura (penalty scored); Marcos Antônio (penalty missed); Luciano (penalty scored); Díaz (penalty scored); Cédric (penalty scored)	4–3	(penalty missed) M. Uribe; (penalty scored) Campuzano; (penalty scored) Morelos; (penalty scored) Tesillo; (penalty missed) Hinestroza

Estádio do Morumbi, São Paulo
Attendance: 57,559
Referee: Maximiliano Ramírez (Argentina)

Tied 1–1 on aggregate, São Paulo won on penalties and advanced to the quarter-finals (Match S1).

12 August 2025
19:00 UTC−3

Fortaleza (Brazil)	0–0	(Argentina) Vélez Sarsfield
	Report

Castelão, Fortaleza
Attendance: 27,955
Referee: Derlis López (Paraguay)
19 August 2025
19:00 UTC−3

Vélez Sarsfield (Argentina)	2–0	(Brazil) Fortaleza
Carrizo 7'; Galván 28'	Report

Estadio José Amalfitani, Buenos Aires
Attendance: 11,581
Referee: Andrés Rojas (Colombia)

Vélez Sarsfield won 2–0 on aggregate and advanced to the quarter-finals (Match S2).

13 August 2025
21:30 UTC−3

Flamengo (Brazil)	1–0	(Brazil) Internacional
Bruno Henrique 28'	Report

Estádio do Maracanã, Rio de Janeiro
Attendance: 68,483
Referee: Darío Herrera (Argentina)
20 August 2025
21:30 UTC−3

Internacional (Brazil)	0–2	(Brazil) Flamengo
	Report	De Arrascaeta 27'; Pedro 88'

Estádio Beira-Rio, Porto Alegre
Attendance: 43,581
Referee: Esteban Ostojich (Uruguay)

Flamengo won 3–0 on aggregate and advanced to the quarter-finals (Match S3).

14 August 2025
19:30 UTC−5

Universitario (Peru)	0–4	(Brazil) Palmeiras
	Report	Gómez 7' (pen.); López 13', 75'; Vitor Roque 30'

Estadio Monumental, Lima
Attendance: 54,043
Referee: Facundo Tello (Argentina)
21 August 2025
21:30 UTC−3

Palmeiras (Brazil)	0–0	(Peru) Universitario
	Report

Allianz Parque, São Paulo
Attendance: 33,203
Referee: Piero Maza (Chile)

Palmeiras won 4–0 on aggregate and advanced to the quarter-finals (Match S4).

14 August 2025
21:30 UTC−3

Libertad (Paraguay)	0–0	(Argentina) River Plate
	Report

Estadio La Huerta, Asunción (Note: The Libertad v River Plate match, originally scheduled at Estadio Defensores del Chaco, Asunción was moved to Libertad's regular stadium Estadio La Huerta, Asunción.)
Attendance: 10,466
Referee: Wilton Sampaio (Brazil)
21 August 2025
21:30 UTC−3

River Plate (Argentina)	1–1	(Paraguay) Libertad
Driussi 29'	Report	Rojas 43'
Penalties
I. Fernández (penalty scored); Borja (penalty scored); Acuña (penalty missed); Martínez Quarta (penalty scored)	3–1	(penalty missed) Recalde; (penalty scored) Viera; (penalty missed) Caballero; (penalty missed) M. Fernández

Estadio Monumental, Buenos Aires
Attendance: 65,030
Referee: Andrés Matonte (Uruguay)

Tied 1–1 on aggregate, River Plate won on penalties and advanced to the quarter-finals (Match S4).

13 August 2025
19:00 UTC−3

Cerro Porteño (Paraguay)	0–1	(Argentina) Estudiantes
	Report	Ascacíbar 90+8' (pen.)

Estadio General Pablo Rojas, Asunción
Attendance: 29,928
Referee: Piero Maza (Chile)
20 August 2025
19:00 UTC−3

Estudiantes (Argentina)	0–0	(Paraguay) Cerro Porteño
	Report

Estadio Jorge Luis Hirschi, La Plata
Attendance: 21,260
Referee: Jesús Valenzuela (Venezuela)

Estudiantes won 1–0 on aggregate and advanced to the quarter-finals (Match S3).

12 August 2025
21:30 UTC−3

Peñarol (Uruguay)	1–0	(Argentina) Racing
Terans 78'	Report

Estadio Campeón del Siglo, Montevideo
Attendance: 35,570
Referee: Raphael Claus (Brazil)
19 August 2025
21:30 UTC−3

Racing (Argentina)	3–1	(Uruguay) Peñarol
Martínez 7', 83' (pen.); Pardo 90+4'	Report	Herrera 15'

El Cilindro, Avellaneda
Attendance: 40,211
Referee: Wilmar Roldán (Colombia)

Racing won 3–2 on aggregate and advanced to the quarter-finals (Match S2).

14 August 2025
19:00 UTC−3

Botafogo (Brazil)	1–0	(Ecuador) LDU Quito
Artur 1'	Report

Estádio Olímpico Nilton Santos, Rio de Janeiro
Attendance: 37,131
Referee: Wilmar Roldán (Colombia)
21 August 2025
17:00 UTC−5

LDU Quito (Ecuador)	2–0	(Brazil) Botafogo
Villamil 7'; Alzugaray 60' (pen.)	Report

Estadio Rodrigo Paz Delgado, Quito
Attendance: 32,854
Referee: Facundo Tello (Argentina)

LDU Quito won 2–1 on aggregate and advanced to the quarter-finals (Match S1).

== Quarter-finals ==
=== Summary ===
The first legs were played on 16–18 September, and the second legs were played on 23–25 September 2025.

Team 1	Agg.	Team 2	1st leg	2nd leg
LDU Quito (Ecuador)	3–0	(Brazil) São Paulo	2–0	1–0
Vélez Sarsfield (Argentina)	0–2	(Argentina) Racing	0–1	0–1
Flamengo (Brazil)	2–2 (4–2 p)	(Argentina) Estudiantes	2–1	0–1
River Plate (Argentina)	2–5	(Brazil) Palmeiras	1–2	1–3

=== Matches ===
18 September 2025
17:00 UTC−5

LDU Quito (Ecuador)	2–0	(Brazil) São Paulo
Ramírez 15'; Estrada 78'	Report

Estadio Rodrigo Paz Delgado, Quito
Referee: Yael Falcón Pérez (Argentina)
25 September 2025
19:00 UTC−3

São Paulo (Brazil)	0–1	(Ecuador) LDU Quito
	Report	Medina 41'

Estádio do Morumbi, São Paulo
Attendance: 54,609
Referee: Alexis Herrera (Venezuela)

LDU Quito won 3–0 on aggregate and advanced to the semi-finals (Match F1).

16 September 2025
19:00 UTC−3

Vélez Sarsfield (Argentina)	0–1	(Argentina) Racing
	Report	Martínez 53'

Estadio José Amalfitani, Buenos Aires
Referee: Wilton Sampaio (Brazil)
23 September 2025
19:00 UTC−3

Racing (Argentina)	1–0	(Argentina) Vélez Sarsfield
Solari 82'	Report

El Cilindro, Avellaneda
Referee: Esteban Ostojich (Uruguay)

Racing won 2–0 on aggregate and advanced to the semi-finals (Match F2).

18 September 2025
21:30 UTC−3

Flamengo (Brazil)	2–1	(Argentina) Estudiantes
Pedro 1'; Varela 9'	Report	Léo Pereira 90+1' (o.g.)

Estádio do Maracanã, Rio de Janeiro
Attendance: 71,977
Referee: Andrés Rojas (Colombia)
25 September 2025
21:30 UTC−3

Estudiantes (Argentina)	1–0	(Brazil) Flamengo
Benedetti 45+2'	Report
Penalties
Sosa (penalty scored); Benedetti (penalty missed); Cetré (penalty scored); Ascacíbar (penalty missed)	2–4	(penalty scored) Jorginho; (penalty scored) Luiz Araújo; (penalty scored) Carrascal; (penalty scored) Léo Pereira

Estadio Jorge Luis Hirschi, La Plata
Referee: Piero Maza (Chile)

Tied 2–2 on aggregate, Flamengo won on penalties and advanced to the semi-finals (Match F2).

17 September 2025
21:30 UTC−3

River Plate (Argentina)	1–2	(Brazil) Palmeiras
Martínez Quarta 89'	Report	Gómez 6'; Vitor Roque 41'

Estadio Monumental, Buenos Aires
Referee: Jesús Valenzuela (Venezuela)
24 September 2025
21:30 UTC−3

Palmeiras (Brazil)	3–1	(Argentina) River Plate
Vitor Roque 51'; López 90+1' (pen.), 90+4'	Report	Salas 8'

Allianz Parque, São Paulo
Attendance: 40,893
Referee: Andrés Matonte (Uruguay)

Palmeiras won 5–2 on aggregate and advanced to the semi-finals (Match F1).

== Semi-finals ==
=== Summary ===
The first legs were played on 22 and 23 October, and the second legs were played on 29 and 30 October 2025.

Team 1	Agg.	Team 2	1st leg	2nd leg
LDU Quito (Ecuador)	3–4	(Brazil) Palmeiras	3–0	0–4
Flamengo (Brazil)	1–0	(Argentina) Racing	1–0	0–0

=== Matches ===
23 October 2025
19:30 UTC−5

LDU Quito (Ecuador)	3–0	(Brazil) Palmeiras
Villamil 16', 45+2'; Alzugaray 27' (pen.)	Report

Estadio Rodrigo Paz Delgado, Quito
Attendance: 34,189
Referee: Facundo Tello (Argentina)
30 October 2025
21:30 UTC−3

Palmeiras (Brazil)	4–0	(Ecuador) LDU Quito
Sosa 20'; Fuchs 45+5'; Veiga 68', 82' (pen.)	Report

Allianz Parque, São Paulo
Attendance: 39,941
Referee: Wilmar Roldán (Colombia)

Palmeiras won 4–3 on aggregate and advanced to the final.

22 October 2025
21:30 UTC−3

Flamengo (Brazil)	1–0	(Argentina) Racing
Carrascal 88'	Report

Estádio do Maracanã, Rio de Janeiro
Attendance: 71,378
Referee: Jesús Valenzuela (Venezuela)
29 October 2025
21:30 UTC−3

Racing (Argentina)	0–0	(Brazil) Flamengo
	Report

El Cilindro, Avellaneda
Referee: Piero Maza (Chile)

Flamengo won 1–0 on aggregate and advanced to the final.

== Final ==
The final was played on 29 November 2025 at the Estadio Monumental in Lima.

29 November 2025
16:15 UTC−5

Palmeiras (Brazil)	0–1	(Brazil) Flamengo
	Report	Danilo 67'

Estadio Monumental, Lima
Attendance: 70,048
Referee: Darío Herrera (Argentina)
