= Jorge Baliño =

Argentine football referee

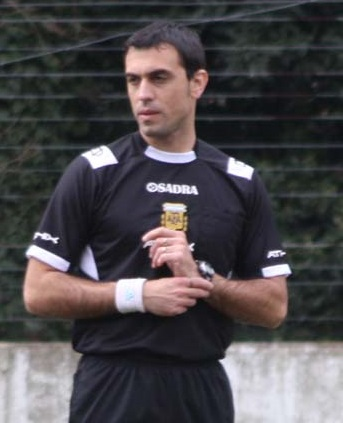
- Baliño in 2009
- Full name: Jorge Ignacio Baliño
- Born: 8 October 1979 (age 47); Tandil, Buenos Aires, Argentina

Domestic
Years	League	Role

International
Years	League	Role
2015–2018	FIFA listed	Referee

Jorge Ignacio Baliño (born 8 October 1979) is an Argentine association football referee, who officiates in the Argentine Primera División and was a FIFA-listed international referee between 2015 and 2018. Since 2022, he is a FIFA-listed VAR official.

Baliño was the VAR official at the 2023 Copa Sudamericana final.

== Career ==
Baliño was born in Tandil, Buenos Aires Province, and first worked as a firefighter in Chillar, a town near Tandil. He made his debut in the Primera División of the Tandil Football League on 25 May 2001.

After officiating for a few seasons in the lower division, Baliño made his debut as a referee in the Primera División of Argentine football in June 2007, at a match between Argentinos Juniors and Club de Gimnasia y Esgrima La Plata. In April 2019, Baliño, joined by several referees and assistant referees of the lower divisions of Argentine football, resigned from the body of Argentine referees, in protest of the leadership of the union's president, Guillermo Marconi.

In July 2022, during a Primera División match between Barracas Central and Club Atlético Patronato, Baliño became involved in a controversy, when he wrongly disallowed two goals against Patronato at the request of VAR and gave an inexistent penalty kick for Barracas.

=== International appearances ===
In mid-January 2017, CONMEBOL announced the referees for the 2017 South American U-17 Championship, which was held in Chile. It was Baliño's first international tournament, who said in an interview with Argentine Football Association website, that he thought it was the right time for him to break into international officiating.

He oversaw the second round of Group A, in the match between Chile and Colombia. During the course of the match, Baliño showed two yellow cards and awarded a penalty kick for Colombia in the 90th minute, which Chilean goalkeeper Borqués Hernández saved moments later.

Baliño serves as a VAR official at the 2025 Copa Libertadores, and was chosen as the AVAR official for the final match between Palmeiras and Flemengo on 29 November.

== Statistics as a referee ==
Tournaments	Constester	Years	Matches	Yellow card	(yellow card) Average	Red card	(red card) Average
Primera División de Argentina	(Argentina) AFA–SAF	2007–	237	1145	4.83	96	0.40
(Argentina) Primera B Nacional	(Argentina) AFA	2006–2015	182	891	4.89	105	0.57
Copa Argentina	(Argentina) AFA	2011–	29	115	3.96	11	0.37
(Argentina) Relegation	(Argentina) AFA	2008	1	5	5.00	3	3.00
(Union of South American Nations) Copa Conmebol Libertadores	(Union of South American Nations) Conmebol	2016–2018	1	3	3.00	0	0.00
(Union of South American Nations) Copa Conmebol Sudamericana	(Union of South American Nations) Conmebol	2010–	3	13	4.33	0	0.00
(Chile) South American U-17 Football Championship	(Union of South American Nations) Conmebol	2017	4	16	4.00	0	0.00
Friendlies	FIFA	2017	1	4	4.00	0	0.00
Totals		2006–	458	2192	4.78	215	0.46
Matches as referee are correct as of 21 March 2023

Source: worldfootball.net
