= 2025 Copa Libertadores =

66th Copa Libertadores edition

Copa CONMEBOL Libertadores 2025
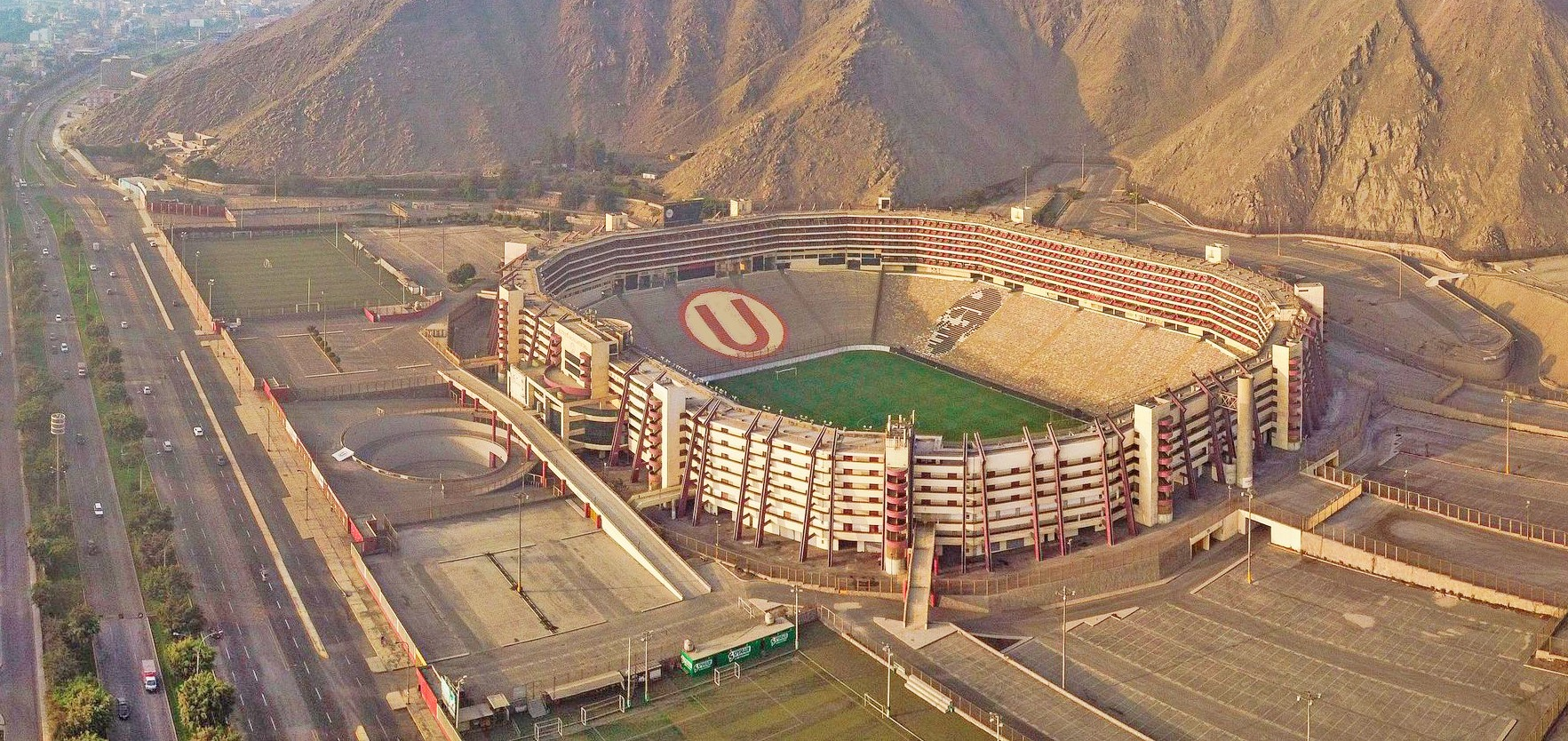
- The Estadio Monumental in Lima hosted the final

Tournament details
- Dates: 4 February – 29 November 2025
- Teams: 47 (from 10 associations)

Final positions
- Champions: (Brazil) Flamengo (4th title)
- Runners-up: (Brazil) Palmeiras

Tournament statistics
- Matches played: 155
- Goals scored: 367 (2.37 per match)
- Top scorer(s): (Argentina) Adrián Martínez (Argentina) José Manuel López (7 goals each)
- Best player: (Uruguay) Giorgian de Arrascaeta

The 2025 Copa CONMEBOL Libertadores was the 66th edition of the CONMEBOL Libertadores (also referred to as the Copa Libertadores), South America's premier club football tournament organized by CONMEBOL. The competition began on 4 February and ended on 29 November 2025, with the final played at Estadio Monumental in Lima, Peru.

Brazilian club Flamengo won their fourth Copa Libertadores title, defeating fellow Brazilian side Palmeiras 1–0 in the final. As winners of the 2025 Copa Libertadores, Flamengo earned the right to play against the winners of the 2025 Copa Sudamericana in the 2026 Recopa Sudamericana. They also automatically qualified for the 2025 FIFA Intercontinental Cup, the 2029 FIFA Club World Cup and the 2026 Copa Libertadores group stage.

Botafogo were the defending champions, but were eliminated by LDU Quito in the round of 16.

With Flamengo's triumph, Brazil tied Argentina as the nation with the most Copa Libertadores championships with 25 titles. This was as well the seventh consecutive edition won by Brazilian clubs.

== Teams ==
The following 47 teams from the 10 CONMEBOL member associations qualified for the tournament:

- Copa Libertadores champions
- Copa Sudamericana champions
- Brazil: 7 berths
- Argentina: 6 berths
- All other associations: 4 berths each

The entry stage was determined as follows:

- Group stage: 28 teams
  - Copa Libertadores champions
  - Copa Sudamericana champions
  - Teams which qualified for berths 1–5 from Argentina and Brazil
  - Teams which qualified for berths 1–2 from all other associations
- Second stage: 13 teams
  - Teams which qualified for berths 6–7 from Brazil
  - Team which qualified for berth 6 from Argentina
  - Teams which qualified for berths 3–4 from Chile and Colombia
  - Teams which qualified for berth 3 from all other associations
- First stage: 6 teams
  - Teams which qualified for berth 4 from Bolivia, Ecuador, Paraguay, Peru, Uruguay and Venezuela

Association	Team (Berth)	Entry stage	Qualification method
Argentina (6 + 1 berths)	Racing (Copa Sudamericana)	Group stage	2024 Copa Sudamericana champions
Argentina (6 + 1 berths)	Vélez Sarsfield (Argentina 1)	Group stage	2024 Liga Profesional de Fútbol champions
Argentina (6 + 1 berths)	Estudiantes (Argentina 2)	Group stage	2024 Copa de la Liga Profesional champions
Argentina (6 + 1 berths)	Central Córdoba (Argentina 3)	Group stage	2024 Copa Argentina champions
Argentina (6 + 1 berths)	Talleres (Argentina 4)	Group stage	2024 Liga Profesional de Fútbol and Copa de la Liga Profesional aggregate table best team not yet qualified
Argentina (6 + 1 berths)	River Plate (Argentina 5)	Group stage	2024 Liga Profesional de Fútbol and Copa de la Liga Profesional aggregate table 2nd best team not yet qualified
Argentina (6 + 1 berths)	Boca Juniors (Argentina 6)	Second stage	2024 Liga Profesional de Fútbol and Copa de la Liga Profesional aggregate table 3rd best team not yet qualified
Bolivia (4 berths)	San Antonio Bulo Bulo (Bolivia 1)	Group stage	2024 Apertura winners
Bolivia (4 berths)	Bolívar (Bolivia 2)	Group stage	2024 Clausura winners
Bolivia (4 berths)	The Strongest (Bolivia 3)	Second stage	2024 División Profesional aggregate table best team not yet qualified
Bolivia (4 berths)	Blooming (Bolivia 4)	First stage	2024 División Profesional aggregate table 5th best team not yet qualified
Brazil (7 + 1 berths)	Botafogo (Title holders)	Group stage	2024 Copa Libertadores champions
Brazil (7 + 1 berths)	Flamengo (Brazil 1)	Group stage	2024 Copa do Brasil champions
Brazil (7 + 1 berths)	Palmeiras (Brazil 2)	Group stage	2024 Campeonato Brasileiro Série A runners-up
Brazil (7 + 1 berths)	Fortaleza (Brazil 3)	Group stage	2024 Campeonato Brasileiro Série A 4th place
Brazil (7 + 1 berths)	Internacional (Brazil 4)	Group stage	2024 Campeonato Brasileiro Série A 5th place
Brazil (7 + 1 berths)	São Paulo (Brazil 5)	Group stage	2024 Campeonato Brasileiro Série A 6th place
Brazil (7 + 1 berths)	Corinthians (Brazil 6)	Second stage	2024 Campeonato Brasileiro Série A 7th place
Brazil (7 + 1 berths)	Bahia (Brazil 7)	Second stage	2024 Campeonato Brasileiro Série A 8th place
Chile (4 berths)	Colo-Colo (Chile 1)	Group stage	2024 Campeonato Nacional de Primera División champions
Chile (4 berths)	Universidad de Chile (Chile 2)	Group stage	2024 Campeonato Nacional de Primera División runners-up
Chile (4 berths)	Deportes Iquique (Chile 3)	Second stage	2024 Campeonato Nacional de Primera División 3rd place
Chile (4 berths)	Ñublense (Chile 4)	Second stage	2024 Copa Chile runners-up
Colombia (4 berths)	Atlético Bucaramanga (Colombia 1)	Group stage	2024 Apertura champions
Colombia (4 berths)	Atlético Nacional (Colombia 2)	Group stage	2024 Finalización champions
Colombia (4 berths)	Deportes Tolima (Colombia 3)	Second stage	2024 Primera A aggregate table best team not yet qualified
Colombia (4 berths)	Santa Fe (Colombia 4)	Second stage	2024 Primera A aggregate table 2nd best team not yet qualified
Ecuador (4 berths)	LDU Quito (Ecuador 1)	Group stage	2024 LigaPro Serie A champions
Ecuador (4 berths)	Independiente del Valle (Ecuador 2)	Group stage	2024 LigaPro Serie A runners-up
Ecuador (4 berths)	Barcelona (Ecuador 3)	Second stage	2024 LigaPro Serie A aggregate table best team not yet qualified
Ecuador (4 berths)	El Nacional (Ecuador 4)	First stage	2024 Copa Ecuador champions
Paraguay (4 berths)	Olimpia (Paraguay 1)	Group stage	2024 Copa de Primera tournament (Apertura or Clausura) champions with better record in aggregate table
Paraguay (4 berths)	Libertad (Paraguay 2)	Group stage	2024 Copa de Primera tournament (Apertura or Clausura) champions with worse record in aggregate table
Paraguay (4 berths)	Cerro Porteño (Paraguay 3)	Second stage	2024 Copa de Primera aggregate table best team not yet qualified
Paraguay (4 berths)	Nacional (Paraguay 4)	First stage	2024 Copa Paraguay runners-up
Peru (4 berths)	Universitario (Peru 1)	Group stage	2024 Liga 1 champions
Peru (4 berths)	Sporting Cristal (Peru 2)	Group stage	2024 Liga 1 runners-up
Peru (4 berths)	Melgar (Peru 3)	Second stage	2024 Liga 1 3rd place
Peru (4 berths)	Alianza Lima (Peru 4)	First stage	2024 Liga 1 4th place
Uruguay (4 berths)	Peñarol (Uruguay 1)	Group stage	2024 Campeonato Uruguayo de Primera División champions
Uruguay (4 berths)	Nacional (Uruguay 2)	Group stage	2024 Campeonato Uruguayo de Primera División runners-up
Uruguay (4 berths)	Boston River (Uruguay 3)	Second stage	2024 Campeonato Uruguayo de Primera División aggregate table best team not yet qualified
Uruguay (4 berths)	Defensor Sporting (Uruguay 4)	First stage	2024 Campeonato Uruguayo de Primera División aggregate table 2nd best team not yet qualified
Venezuela (4 berths)	Deportivo Táchira (Venezuela 1)	Group stage	2024 Liga FUTVE champions
Venezuela (4 berths)	Carabobo (Venezuela 2)	Group stage	2024 Liga FUTVE runners-up
Venezuela (4 berths)	Universidad Central (Venezuela 3)	Second stage	2024 Liga FUTVE aggregate table best team not yet qualified
Venezuela (4 berths)	Monagas (Venezuela 4)	First stage	2024 Liga FUTVE aggregate table 2nd best team not yet qualified

== Schedule ==
The schedule of the competition was as follows:

Schedule for 2025 Copa Libertadores
Stage	Draw date	First leg	Second leg
First stage	19 December 2024	4–6 February 2025	11–13 February 2025
Second stage	19 December 2024	18–20 February 2025	25–27 February 2025
Third stage	19 December 2024	4–6 March 2025	11–13 March 2025
Group stage	17 March 2025	Matchday 1: 1–3 April 2025; Matchday 2: 8–10 April 2025; Matchday 3: 22–24 April 2025; Matchday 4: 6–8 May 2025; Matchday 5: 13–15 May 2025; Matchday 6: 27–29 May 2025	
Round of 16	2 June 2025	12–14 August 2025	19–21 August 2025
Quarter-finals	2 June 2025	16–18 September 2025	23–25 September 2025
Semi-finals	2 June 2025	21–23 October 2025	28–30 October 2025
Final	2 June 2025	29 November 2025 at Estadio Monumental, Lima	

== Draws ==
Location of teams of the 2025 Copa Libertadores.
Brown: Group A; Red: Group B; Orange: Group C;
Yellow: Group D; Green: Group E; Blue: Group F;
Purple: Group G; Pink: Group H; White: Play-off rounds.

The draw for the qualifying stages was held on 19 December 2024, 12:00 PYT (UTC−3), at the CONMEBOL Convention Centre in Luque, Paraguay.

Teams were seeded by their CONMEBOL Clubs ranking as of 16 December 2024 (shown in parentheses), taking into account the following three factors:

1. Performance in the last 10 years, taking into account Copa Libertadores and Copa Sudamericana results in the period 2015–2024.
2. Historical coefficient, taking into account Copa Libertadores and Copa Sudamericana results in the period 1960–2014 and 2002–2014 respectively.
3. Local tournament champion, with bonus points awarded to domestic league champions of the last 10 years.

For the first stage, the six teams were drawn into three ties (E1–E3), with the teams from Pot 1 hosting the second leg.

First stage draw
Pot 1	Pot 2
(Peru) Alianza Lima (50); (Ecuador) El Nacional (68); (Uruguay) Defensor Sporting (75)	(Paraguay) Nacional (85); (Venezuela) Monagas (99); (Bolivia) Blooming (111)

1. ^{†} The identity of the team from Bolivia was not known at the time the pots were announced and it was seeded in Pot 2.

For the second stage, the 16 teams were drawn into eight ties (C1–C8), with the teams from Pot 1 hosting the second leg. Teams from the same association could not be drawn into the same tie, excluding the three winners of the first stage, which were seeded in Pot 2 and whose identity was not known at the time of the draw, and could be drawn into the same tie with another team from the same association.

Second stage draw
Pot 1	Pot 2
(Argentina) Boca Juniors (3); (Brazil) Corinthians (18); (Paraguay) Cerro Porteño (20); (Ecuador) Barcelona (25); (Colombia) Santa Fe (45); (Peru) Melgar (51); (Brazil) Bahia (77); (Chile) Ñublense (90)	(Chile) Deportes Iquique (153); (Uruguay) Boston River (206); (Venezuela) Universidad Central (No rank); (Bolivia) The Strongest (36); (Colombia) Deportes Tolima (54); First stage winner E1; First stage winner E2; First stage winner E3

1. ^{†} The identity of the team from Bolivia and the second team from Colombia was not known at the time the pots were announced and they were seeded in Pot 2.

For the third stage, the eight winners of the second stage were allocated without any draw into the following four ties (G1–G4), with the team in each tie with the higher CONMEBOL ranking hosting the second leg.

- Second stage winner C1 vs. Second stage winner C8
- Second stage winner C2 vs. Second stage winner C7
- Second stage winner C3 vs. Second stage winner C6
- Second stage winner C4 vs. Second stage winner C5

For the group stage, the 32 teams were drawn into eight groups (Groups A–H) of four containing a team from each of the four pots. Teams from the same association could not be drawn into the same group, excluding the four winners of the third stage, which were allocated to Pot 4 and could be drawn into the same group with another team from the same association.

Group stage draw
Pot 1	Pot 2	Pot 3	Pot 4
(Brazil) Botafogo (21); (Argentina) River Plate (1); (Brazil) Palmeiras (2); (Brazil) Flamengo (4); (Uruguay) Peñarol (5); (Uruguay) Nacional (6); (Brazil) São Paulo (8); (Argentina) Racing (12)	(Paraguay) Olimpia (13); (Ecuador) LDU Quito (14); (Brazil) Internacional (15); (Paraguay) Libertad (16); (Ecuador) Independiente del Valle (17); (Chile) Colo-Colo (23); (Argentina) Estudiantes (24); (Bolivia) Bolívar (27)	(Colombia) Atlético Nacional (28); (Argentina) Vélez Sarsfield (29); (Brazil) Fortaleza (37); (Peru) Sporting Cristal (38); (Peru) Universitario (41); (Argentina) Talleres (46); (Venezuela) Deportivo Táchira (49); Universidad de Chile (57)	(Venezuela) Carabobo (173); (Colombia) Atlético Bucaramanga (198); (Argentina) Central Córdoba (No rank); (Bolivia) San Antonio Bulo Bulo (No rank); (Peru) Alianza Lima (50); (Brazil) Bahia (77); (Paraguay) Cerro Porteño (20); (Ecuador) Barcelona (25)

Notes

1. ^{TH} The defending Copa Libertadores champions were automatically allocated to Group A and the position A1.
2. ^{CS} The defending Copa Sudamericana champions (normally seeded in Pot 2) were seeded in Pot 1 due to their CONMEBOL Clubs rank.
3. ^{Q3} The third stage winners were seeded in Pot 4.

The draw for the round of 16 was held on 2 June 2025, 12:00 PYT (UTC−3) at the CONMEBOL headquarters in Luque, Paraguay. For the round of 16, the 16 teams were drawn into eight ties (A–H) between a group winner (Pot 1) and a group runner-up (Pot 2), with the group winners hosting the second leg. Teams from the same association or the same group could be drawn into the same tie (Regulations Article 2.2.3.2).

== Qualifying stages ==
In the qualifying stages, each tie was played on a home-and-away two-legged basis. If tied on aggregate, extra time was not played, and a penalty shoot-out was used to determine the winner (Regulations Article 2.4.3). The qualifying stages were structured as follows:

- First stage (6 teams): The three winners of the first stage advanced to the second stage to join the 13 teams which were given byes to the second stage.
- Second stage (16 teams): The eight winners of the second stage advanced to the third stage.
- Third stage (8 teams): The four winners of the third stage advanced to the group stage to join the 28 direct entrants. The four teams eliminated in the third stage entered the Copa Sudamericana group stage.

=== First stage ===
Team 1	Agg.	Team 2	1st leg	2nd leg
Blooming (Bolivia)	4–4 (3–4 p)	(Ecuador) El Nacional	3–2	1–2
Nacional (Paraguay)	2–4	(Peru) Alianza Lima	1–1	1–3
Monagas (Venezuela)	4–0	(Uruguay) Defensor Sporting	2–0	2–0

=== Second stage ===
Team 1	Agg.	Team 2	1st leg	2nd leg
Deportes Iquique (Chile)	3–3 (2–1 p)	(Colombia) Santa Fe	2–1	1–2
The Strongest (Bolivia)	1–4	(Brazil) Bahia	1–1	0–3
Monagas (Venezuela)	1–7	(Paraguay) Cerro Porteño	0–4	1–3
El Nacional (Ecuador)	1–2	(Ecuador) Barcelona	0–1	1–1
Universidad Central (Venezuela)	3–4	(Brazil) Corinthians	1–1	2–3
Deportes Tolima (Colombia)	0–2	(Peru) Melgar	0–1	0–1
Boston River (Uruguay)	2–1	(Chile) Ñublense	1–0	1–1
Alianza Lima (Peru)	2–2 (5–4 p)	(Argentina) Boca Juniors	1–0	1–2

=== Third stage ===
Team 1	Agg.	Team 2	1st leg	2nd leg
Deportes Iquique (Chile)	2–3	(Peru) Alianza Lima	1–2	1–1
Boston River (Uruguay)	0–1	(Brazil) Bahia	0–0	0–1
Melgar (Peru)	2–5	(Paraguay) Cerro Porteño	0–1	2–4
Barcelona (Ecuador)	3–2	(Brazil) Corinthians	3–0	0–2

== Group stage ==
In the group stage, each group was played on a home-and-away round-robin basis. Teams were ranked according to the following criteria: 1. Points (3 points for a win, 1 point for a draw, and 0 points for a loss); 2. Goal difference; 3. Goals scored; 4. Away goals scored; 5. CONMEBOL ranking (Regulations Article 2.4.2).

The winners and runners-up of each group advanced to the round of 16 of the final stages. The third-placed teams of each group entered the knockout round play-offs of the 2025 Copa Sudamericana.

=== Group A ===
Pos	Team	Pld	W	D	L	GF	GA	GD	Pts	Qualification	EST	BOT	UCH	CBO
1	(Argentina) Estudiantes	6	4	0	2	11	5	+6	12	Round of 16	—	1–0	1–2	2–0
2	(Brazil) Botafogo	6	4	0	2	8	5	+3	12	Round of 16	3–2	—	1–0	2–0
3	Universidad de Chile	6	3	1	2	8	6	+2	10	Copa Sudamericana	0–3	1–0	—	4–0
4	(Venezuela) Carabobo	6	0	1	5	2	13	−11	1		0–2	1–2	1–1	—

Source: CONMEBOL

=== Group B ===
Pos	Team	Pld	W	D	L	GF	GA	GD	Pts	Qualification	RIV	UNI	IDV	BSC
1	(Argentina) River Plate	6	3	3	0	13	7	+6	12	Round of 16	—	1–1	6–2	0–0
2	(Peru) Universitario	6	2	2	2	4	4	0	8	Round of 16	0–1	—	1–1	1–0
3	(Ecuador) Independiente del Valle	6	2	2	2	8	11	−3	8	Copa Sudamericana	2–2	1–0	—	2–1
4	(Ecuador) Barcelona	6	1	1	4	4	7	−3	4		2–3	0–1	1–0	—

Source: CONMEBOL

=== Group C ===
Pos	Team	Pld	W	D	L	GF	GA	GD	Pts	Qualification	LDQ	FLA	CCO	TAC
1	(Ecuador) LDU Quito	6	3	2	1	8	4	+4	11	Round of 16	—	0–0	3–0	2–0
2	(Brazil) Flamengo	6	3	2	1	6	3	+3	11	Round of 16	2–0	—	1–2	1–0
3	(Argentina) Central Córdoba	6	3	2	1	7	7	0	11	Copa Sudamericana	0–0	1–1	—	2–1
4	(Venezuela) Deportivo Táchira	6	0	0	6	4	11	−7	0		2–3	0–1	1–2	—

Source: CONMEBOL

=== Group D ===
Pos	Team	Pld	W	D	L	GF	GA	GD	Pts	Qualification	SPA	LIB	ALI	TAL
1	(Brazil) São Paulo	6	4	2	0	10	4	+6	14	Round of 16	—	1–1	2–2	2–1
2	(Paraguay) Libertad	6	2	3	1	6	5	+1	9	Round of 16	0–2	—	2–2	2–0
3	(Peru) Alianza Lima	6	1	2	3	7	11	−4	5	Copa Sudamericana	0–2	0–1	—	3–2
4	(Argentina) Talleres	6	1	1	4	5	8	−3	4		0–1	0–0	2–0	—

Source: CONMEBOL

=== Group E ===
Pos	Team	Pld	W	D	L	GF	GA	GD	Pts	Qualification	RAC	FOR	BUC	CLC
1	(Argentina) Racing	6	4	1	1	14	3	+11	13	Round of 16	—	1–0	1–2	4–0
2	(Brazil) Fortaleza	6	2	2	2	8	5	+3	8	Round of 16	0–3	—	0–0	4–0
3	(Colombia) Atlético Bucaramanga	6	1	3	2	6	10	−4	6	Copa Sudamericana	0–4	1–1	—	3–3
4	(Chile) Colo-Colo	6	1	2	3	5	15	−10	5		1–1	0–3 (Note: The Colo-Colo v Fortaleza match was suspended at 0–0 in the 68th minute of play after Colo-Colo fans invaded the pitch following the passing of two fellow supporters in an incident prior to the start of the match. After a one-hour wait, CONMEBOL announced the abandonment of the match and referred the matter to its Disciplinary Commission, which subsequently awarded Fortaleza a 3–0 win.)	1–0	—

Source: CONMEBOL

=== Group F ===
Pos	Team	Pld	W	D	L	GF	GA	GD	Pts	Qualification	INT	ATN	BAH	NAC
1	(Brazil) Internacional	6	3	2	1	12	8	+4	11	Round of 16	—	3–0	2–1	3–3
2	(Colombia) Atlético Nacional	6	3	0	3	7	6	+1	9	Round of 16	3–1	—	1–0	3–0
3	(Brazil) Bahia	6	2	1	3	5	7	−2	7	Copa Sudamericana	1–1	1–0	—	1–3
4	(Uruguay) Nacional	6	2	1	3	7	10	−3	7		0–2	1–0	0–1	—

Source: CONMEBOL

=== Group G ===
Pos	Team	Pld	W	D	L	GF	GA	GD	Pts	Qualification	PAL	CCP	BOL	CRI
1	(Brazil) Palmeiras	6	6	0	0	17	4	+13	18	Round of 16	—	1–0	2–0	6–0
2	(Paraguay) Cerro Porteño	6	2	1	3	7	11	−4	7	Round of 16	0–2	—	4–2	2–2
3	(Bolivia) Bolívar	6	2	0	4	12	11	+1	6	Copa Sudamericana	2–3	4–0	—	3–0
4	(Peru) Sporting Cristal	6	1	1	4	6	16	−10	4		2–3	0–1	2–1	—

Source: CONMEBOL

=== Group H ===
Pos	Team	Pld	W	D	L	GF	GA	GD	Pts	Qualification	VEL	PEÑ	SAB	OLI
1	(Argentina) Vélez Sarsfield	6	3	2	1	11	4	+7	11	Round of 16	—	2–1	3–0	1–1
2	(Uruguay) Peñarol	6	3	2	1	9	4	+5	11	Round of 16	0–0	—	2–0	3–2
3	(Bolivia) San Antonio Bulo Bulo	6	2	0	4	5	15	−10	6	Copa Sudamericana	2–1	0–3	—	3–2
4	(Paraguay) Olimpia	6	1	2	3	9	11	−2	5		0–4	0–0	4–0	—

Source: CONMEBOL

== Final stages ==
Starting from the round of 16, the teams played a single-elimination tournament with the following rules:

- In the round of 16, quarter-finals and semi-finals, each tie was played on a home-and-away two-legged basis, with the higher-seeded team hosting the second leg (Regulations Article 2.2.3.2). If tied on aggregate, extra time would not be played, and a penalty shoot-out would be used to determine the winners (Regulations Article 2.4.3).
- The final was played as a single match at a venue pre-selected by CONMEBOL, with the higher-seeded team designated as the "home" team for administrative purposes (Regulations Article 2.2.3.5). If tied after regulation, 30 minutes of extra time would be played. If still tied after extra time, a penalty shoot-out would be used to determine the winners (Regulations Article 2.4.4).

=== Qualified teams ===
The winners and runners-up of each of the eight groups in the group stage advanced to the round of 16.

Group	Winners	Runners-up
A	(Argentina) Estudiantes	(Brazil) Botafogo
B	(Argentina) River Plate	(Peru) Universitario
C	(Ecuador) LDU Quito	(Brazil) Flamengo
D	(Brazil) São Paulo	(Paraguay) Libertad
E	(Argentina) Racing	(Brazil) Fortaleza
F	(Brazil) Internacional	(Colombia) Atlético Nacional
G	(Brazil) Palmeiras	(Paraguay) Cerro Porteño
H	(Argentina) Vélez Sarsfield	(Uruguay) Peñarol

=== Seeding ===
Starting from the round of 16, the teams were seeded according to their results in the group stage, with the group winners (Pot 1) seeded 1–8, and the group runners-up (Pot 2) seeded 9–16.

Seed	Grp	Team	Pld	W	D	L	GF	GA	GD	Pts	Round of 16 draw
1	G	(Brazil) Palmeiras	6	6	0	0	17	4	+13	18	Pot 1
2	D	(Brazil) São Paulo	6	4	2	0	10	4	+6	14	Pot 1
3	E	(Argentina) Racing	6	4	1	1	14	3	+11	13	Pot 1
4	B	(Argentina) River Plate	6	3	3	0	13	7	+6	12	Pot 1
5	A	(Argentina) Estudiantes	6	4	0	2	11	5	+6	12	Pot 1
6	H	(Argentina) Vélez Sarsfield	6	3	2	1	11	4	+7	11	Pot 1
7	F	(Brazil) Internacional	6	3	2	1	12	8	+4	11	Pot 1
8	C	(Ecuador) LDU Quito	6	3	2	1	8	4	+4	11	Pot 1
9	A	(Brazil) Botafogo	6	4	0	2	8	5	+3	12	Pot 2
10	H	(Uruguay) Peñarol	6	3	2	1	9	4	+5	11	Pot 2
11	C	(Brazil) Flamengo	6	3	2	1	6	3	+3	11	Pot 2
12	F	(Colombia) Atlético Nacional	6	3	0	3	7	6	+1	9	Pot 2
13	D	(Paraguay) Libertad	6	2	3	1	6	5	+1	9	Pot 2
14	E	(Brazil) Fortaleza	6	2	2	2	8	5	+3	8	Pot 2
15	B	(Peru) Universitario	6	2	2	2	4	4	0	8	Pot 2
16	G	(Paraguay) Cerro Porteño	6	2	1	3	7	11	−4	7	Pot 2

Source: CONMEBOL
Rules for classification: 1) Higher position in group; 2) Points; 3) Goal difference; 4) Goals scored; 5) Away goals scored; 6) CONMEBOL ranking (Regulations Article 2.4.2).

=== Bracket ===
The bracket was decided based on the round of 16 draw, which was held on 2 June 2025.

Round of 16
9	(Brazil) Botafogo	1	0	1
8	(Ecuador) LDU Quito	0	2	2
12	(Colombia) Atlético Nacional	0	1	1 (3)
2	(Brazil) São Paulo (p)	0	1	1 (4)
13	(Paraguay) Libertad	0	1	1 (1)
4	(Argentina) River Plate (p)	0	1	1 (3)
15	(Peru) Universitario	0	0	0
1	(Brazil) Palmeiras	4	0	4
11	(Brazil) Flamengo	1	2	3
7	(Brazil) Internacional	0	0	0
16	(Paraguay) Cerro Porteño	0	0	0
5	(Argentina) Estudiantes	1	0	1
14	(Brazil) Fortaleza	0	0	0
6	(Argentina) Vélez Sarsfield	0	2	2
10	(Uruguay) Peñarol	1	1	2
3	(Argentina) Racing	0	3	3

Quarter-finals
8	(Ecuador) LDU Quito	2	1	3
2	(Brazil) São Paulo	0	0	0
4	(Argentina) River Plate	1	1	2
1	(Brazil) Palmeiras	2	3	5
11	(Brazil) Flamengo (p)	2	0	2 (4)
5	(Argentina) Estudiantes	1	1	2 (2)
6	(Argentina) Vélez Sarsfield	0	0	0
3	(Argentina) Racing	1	1	2

Semi-finals
8	(Ecuador) LDU Quito	3	0	3
1	(Brazil) Palmeiras	0	4	4
11	(Brazil) Flamengo	1	0	1
3	(Argentina) Racing	0	0	0

Final
29 November – Lima
1	(Brazil) Palmeiras	0
11	(Brazil) Flamengo	1

=== Round of 16 ===
Team 1	Agg.	Team 2	1st leg	2nd leg
Atlético Nacional (Colombia)	1–1 (3–4 p)	(Brazil) São Paulo	0–0	1–1
Fortaleza (Brazil)	0–2	(Argentina) Vélez Sarsfield	0–0	0–2
Flamengo (Brazil)	3–0	(Brazil) Internacional	1–0	2–0
Universitario (Peru)	0–4	(Brazil) Palmeiras	0–4	0–0
Libertad (Paraguay)	1–1 (1–3 p)	(Argentina) River Plate	0–0	1–1
Cerro Porteño (Paraguay)	0–1	(Argentina) Estudiantes	0–1	0–0
Peñarol (Uruguay)	2–3	(Argentina) Racing	1–0	1–3
Botafogo (Brazil)	1–2	(Ecuador) LDU Quito	1–0	0–2

=== Quarter-finals ===
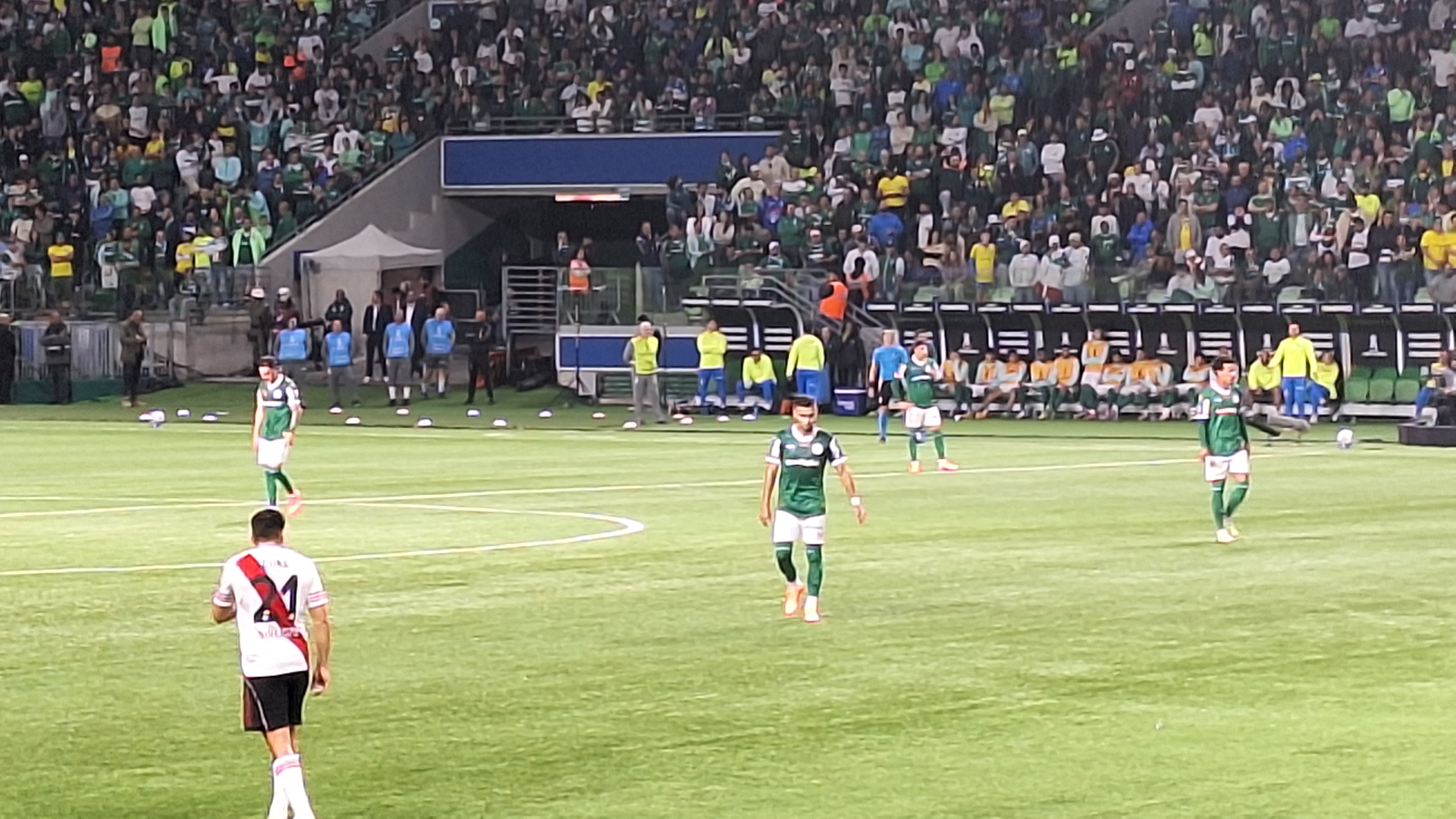
Palmeiras v River Plate in São Paulo

Team 1	Agg.	Team 2	1st leg	2nd leg
LDU Quito (Ecuador)	3–0	(Brazil) São Paulo	2–0	1–0
Vélez Sarsfield (Argentina)	0–2	(Argentina) Racing	0–1	0–1
Flamengo (Brazil)	2–2 (4–2 p)	(Argentina) Estudiantes	2–1	0–1
River Plate (Argentina)	2–5	(Brazil) Palmeiras	1–2	1–3

=== Semi-finals ===
Team 1	Agg.	Team 2	1st leg	2nd leg
LDU Quito (Ecuador)	3–4	(Brazil) Palmeiras	3–0	0–4
Flamengo (Brazil)	1–0	(Argentina) Racing	1–0	0–0

=== Final ===
29 November 2025
16:15 UTC−5

Palmeiras (Brazil)	0–1	(Brazil) Flamengo
	Report	Danilo 67'

Estadio Monumental, Lima
Attendance: 70,048
Referee: Darío Herrera (Argentina)

== Statistics ==
=== Top scorers ===
Rank	Player	Team	1Q1	1Q2	2Q1	2Q2	3Q1	3Q2	GS1	GS2	GS3	GS4	GS5	GS6	⅛F1	⅛F2	QF1	QF2	SF1	SF2	F	Total
1	(Argentina) José Manuel López	(Brazil) Palmeiras									1			2	2			2				7
1	(Argentina) Adrián Martínez	(Argentina) Racing										1	2	1		2	1					7
3	(Bolivia) Ramiro Vaca	(Bolivia) Bolívar							2	2		1										5
3	(Brazil) Alan Patrick	(Brazil) Internacional								3	1	1										5
3	(Argentina) Maher Carrizo	(Argentina) Vélez Sarsfield							1	1		1	1			1						5
3	(Argentina) Hernán Barcos	(Peru) Alianza Lima	1	1		1	1				1											5
3	(Argentina) Lisandro Alzugaray	(Ecuador) LDU Quito										1		2		1			1			5
8	(Brazil) Estêvão	(Brazil) Palmeiras							1		1	1		1								4
8	(Colombia) Kevin Viveros	(Colombia) Atlético Nacional							1			2	1									4
8	(Paraguay) Álex Arce	(Ecuador) LDU Quito								2		2										4
8	(Argentina) Claudio Spinelli	(Ecuador) Independiente del Valle									2	1	1									4
8	(Brazil) Fábio Gomes	(Bolivia) Bolívar								1	2			1								4
8	(Brazil) André Silva	(Brazil) São Paulo									1	2				1						4
8	(Argentina) Sebastián Driussi	(Argentina) River Plate									1	1	1			1						4
8	(Brazil) Jean Lucas	(Brazil) Bahia						1	1			1		1								4
8	(Brazil) Vitor Roque	(Brazil) Palmeiras										1			1		1	1				4
8	(Peru) Kevin Quevedo	(Peru) Alianza Lima		2				1		1												4

Source: CONMEBOL

=== Team of the tournament ===
The CONMEBOL technical study group selected the following 11 players as the team of the tournament.

Position	Player	Team
Goalkeeper	(Argentina) Agustín Rossi	(Brazil) Flamengo
Defenders	(Brazil) Léo Pereira	(Brazil) Flamengo
Defenders	(Brazil) Danilo	(Brazil) Flamengo
Defenders	(Paraguay) Gustavo Gómez	(Brazil) Palmeiras
Midfielders	(Argentina) Santiago Sosa	(Argentina) Racing
Midfielders	(Chile) Erick Pulgar	(Brazil) Flamengo
Midfielders	(Colombia) Jorge Carrascal	(Brazil) Flamengo
Midfielders	(Uruguay) Giorgian de Arrascaeta	(Brazil) Flamengo
Forwards	(Brazil) Pedro	(Brazil) Flamengo
Forwards	(Argentina) Adrián Martínez	(Argentina) Racing
Forwards	(Argentina) José Manuel López	(Brazil) Palmeiras

== See also ==
- 2025 Copa Sudamericana
