= Darío Herrera (referee) =

Argentine football referee (born 1985)

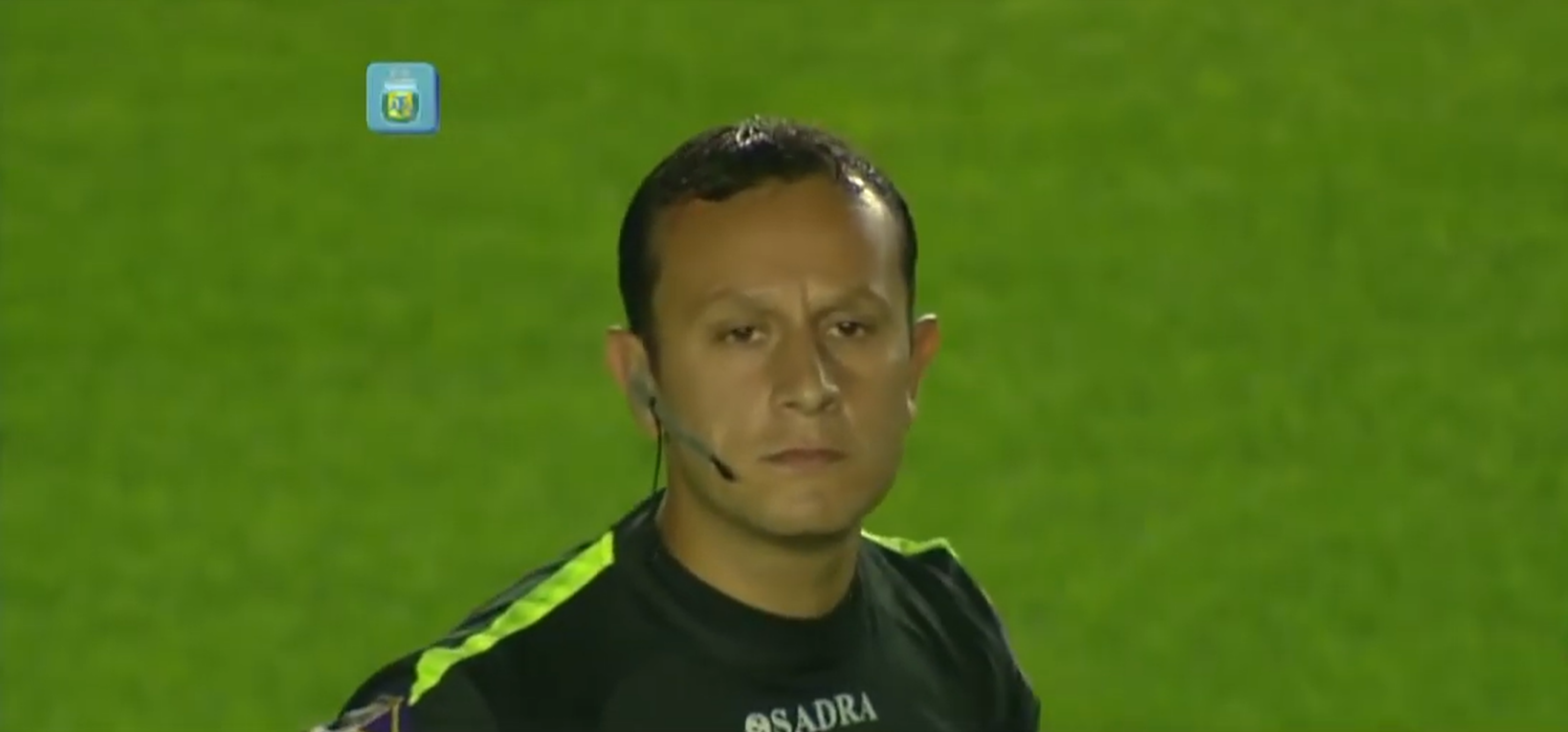
- Herrera in 2015
- Full name: Darío Humberto Herrera
- Born: 24 February 1985 (age 41); Andacollo, Neuquén Province, Argentina
- Other occupation: Physical education teacher

Domestic
Years	League	Role
2013–	Argentine Primera División	Referee

International
Years	League	Role
2015–	FIFA listed	Referee

Darío Humberto Herrera (born 24 February 1985) is an Argentine international football referee who officiates in the Argentine Primera División.

== National career ==
Born in Andacollo, Neuquén, Herrera made his debut as a referee in 2013, leading the match between Colón and Vélez Sarsfield. He is a member of the SADRA (the trade union of professional referees in Argentina). Herrera came under scrutiny in 2013, when during a season's match between San Lorenzo de Almagro and River Plate, he made player Julio Buffarini take a second change at a penalty kick because of an alleged advancement by goalkeeper Marcelo Barovero.

=== Appearances in the Superclásico ===
As of May 2026, Herrera has refereed seven matches of Argentina's derby (Superclásico) between Boca Juniors and River Plate. In May 2015, both teams faced each other in the round of 16 of the 2015 Copa Libertadores, and Herrera was appointed to oversee the second leg, which was played at the Bombonera Stadium. It was his first Superclásico, and it was also his debut in international competitions. The match was suspended at halftime due to an attack by a Boca Juniors' supporter towards the visiting players as they were about to return to the field for the second half.

At local tournaments, Herrera was appointed and then formally assigned in September 2015 (he shared the nomination with Fernando Rapallini) to be in charge of officiating in the second Superclásico of the year. The match ended in a 0–1 victory for Boca Juniors at the Estadio Monumental.

In April 2026, Herrera refereed his seventh Superclásico, where he was assisted by Juan Pablo Belatti and Pablo González, while Héctor Paletta officiated as VAR. During the last minutes of the match, River Plate player Lucas Martínez Quarta fell in the penalty area after a contact with Lautaro Blanco. Herrera did not sanction the foul upon being assured by VAR Héctor Paletta, with both receiving heavy criticism afterward. Martínez Quarta ironically asked Herrera if he was going to the World Cup, suggesting Herrera's bad performances for the tournament.

=== Other derbies ===
Herrera has also officiated in other clásicos, such as a 2025 Rosario derby between Newell's Old Boys and Rosario Central, or less prominent clásicos at two Supercopa Argentina finals: the 2015 victory of San Lorenzo over Boca and the 2019 River Plate 5–0 victory over Racing Club.

== International refereeing ==
Herrera has been an international FIFA-listed referee since 2015 and has since overseen matches in the CONMEBOL qualification for the World Cups. He was also appointed as the second Argentine referee for the 2024 Copa América in the United States, the other being Yael Falcón Pérez. Herrera oversaw two games: Colombia vs Paraguay for Group D in Houston, and Uruguay vs. Brazil for the quarter-finals in Paradise, Nevada.

In July 2025, Herrera refereed the Supercopa Internacional between Estudiantes de La Plata and Vélez Sarsfield, as well as several matches at the Copa Sudamericana. He has also officiated in Copa Libertadores and youth tournaments like the 2025 FIFA U-20 World Cup in Chile, where he oversaw several games, including a round of 16 match between Morocco and South Korea in Rancagua.

Herrera was appointed as the referee of the final of the 2025 Copa Libertadores between Palmeiras and Flamengo, played in Lima, Peru on 29 November 2025. He was selected along with assistants referees Cristian Navarro and José Savorani and Nicolás Ramírez as the fourth official, all from Argentina. In charge of the VAR and AVAR were chosen other two Argentines: Héctor Paletta and Jorge Baliño, respectively.

=== 2026 FIFA World Cup ===
In March 2026, Herrera was the fourth referee at the final of pathway 1 of the 2026 FIFA World Cup qualification (inter-confederation play-offs) between DR Congo and Jamaica, where he took over as central referee following the injury of fellow Argentine Facundo Tello in the 114th minute of the match. Days after the match, on 9 April, he was selected as one of the three Argentine central referees for the 2026 FIFA World Cup.

Herrera made his only appearance in the tournament in the Group G match between Belgium and Iran at SoFi Stadium in Los Angeles. He showed a red card to Belgian center-back Nathan Ngoy following a foul interrupting a direct attack by Iranian player Mehdi Taremi. The game ended in a 0–0 draw.

== Selected record ==
2024 Copa América – United States
Date	Match	Result	Round
24 June 2024	Colombia – Paraguay	2–1	Group stage
6 July 2024	Uruguay – Brazil	0–0 (4–2)	Quarter-finals
2025 Copa Libertadores – Lima, Peru (Note: The final game, not the entire tournament)
Date	Match	Result	Round
29 November 2025	(Brazil) Palmeiras – (Brazil) Flamengo	0–1	Final
2026 FIFA World Cup – North America
Date	Match	Result	Round
21 June 2026	Belgium – Iran	0–0	Group stage
