= Estadio Monumental "U" =

Stadium in Lima, Peru

Estadio Monumental U
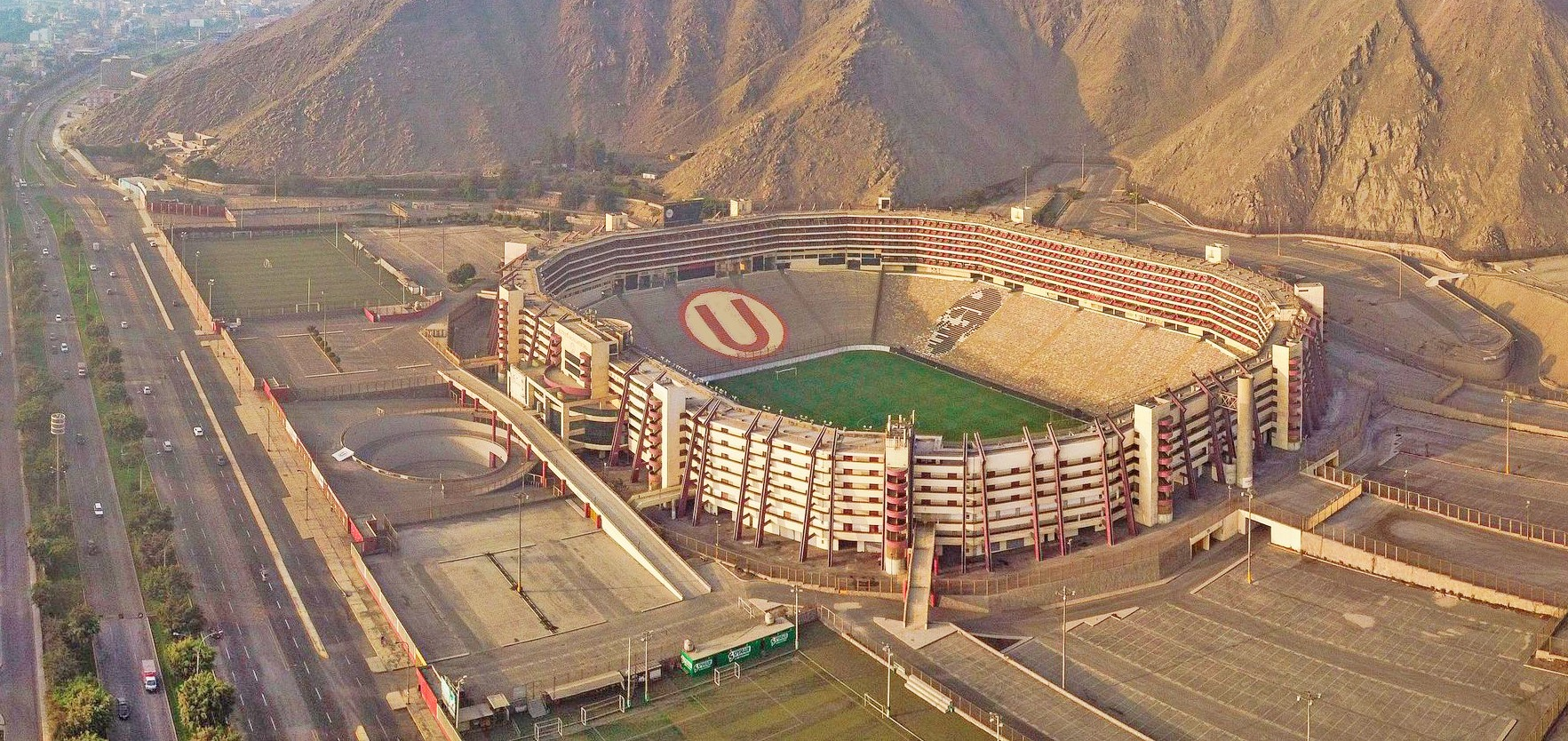
- Aerial view
- Interactive map of Estadio Monumental U
- Location: Lima, Peru
- Coordinates: 12.055665°S 76.935883°W
- Owner: Club Universitario de Deportes
- Operator: Club Universitario de Deportes
- Capacity: 80,093
- Surface: Grass
- Record attendance: 80,208 (2 July 2000)
- Field size: 105 m × 69 m (344 ft × 226 ft)

Construction
- Groundbreaking: 16 January 1991
- Opened: 2 July 2000
- Cost: S/.146,538,000
- Architect: Walter Lavalleja Sarries
- Project manager: Walter Lavalleja Sarries
- Main contractors: Gremco; Progreso International

Tenants
- Club Universitario de Deportes (2000–present); Peru national football team (selected matches)

Estadio Monumental "U" is a football stadium in the district of Ate in Lima, Peru. It is the home of Club Universitario de Deportes of the Peruvian Primera División, and it was opened in 2000 to replace the Estadio Teodoro Lolo Fernandez. Its only legal owner is the club itself. Designed by Progreso International and Gremco S.A., Uruguayan architect Walter Lavalleja led the construction of the stadium. At the time of its construction, it became Peru's largest stadium and the second largest in South America. The stadium was built in accordance with FIFA’s manual of technical specifications for World Cup finals.

The stadium has hosted some of the Peru national football team's international matches including FIFA World Cup Qualifiers. It also hosted the final stages of the 2008 Copa Perú. However, the Monumental was absent from the organization of the 2004 Copa América because of conflicts between the club and the organizers. In addition, between its opening in 2000 until 2007, only one edition of the Peruvian Clásico was played due to security concerns; however, in late 2008, the derby returned to the stadium.

On 5 November 2019, the Estadio Monumental was selected by CONMEBOL to host the 2019 Copa Libertadores Final, won by Flamengo against River Plate (2–1), after the outbreak of 2019 Chilean protests raised security concerns about the development of the match in Santiago, city initially chosen as host. It hosted the Copa Libertadores final once more in 2025.

== History ==
The project was planned in 1989 as a sports complex that would include, in addition to the stadium itself, spaces for other activities and uses of the Club Universitario de Deportes. The cornerstone was laid on 16 January 1991, and the land was purchased on 18 October 1994. The fully constructed stadium was finally inaugurated on 2 July 2000, with Universitario winning 2–0 against Sporting Cristal in a match that year's Apertura Tournament. The inaugural match registered 80,208 people, becoming the most attended match held at the stadium. The new stadium replaced Universitarios old stadium, Estadio Teodoro Lolo Fernández.

In 2010, the club created a presidential luxury box for the President of Peru, called the Palco Presidencial Mario Vargas Llosa, in honor of the Peruvian writer and Universitario fan for winning the 2010 Nobel Prize in Literature. In November that same year, seats were added on the Oriente stand in a pattern that resembles historic player, Teodoro Fernández.

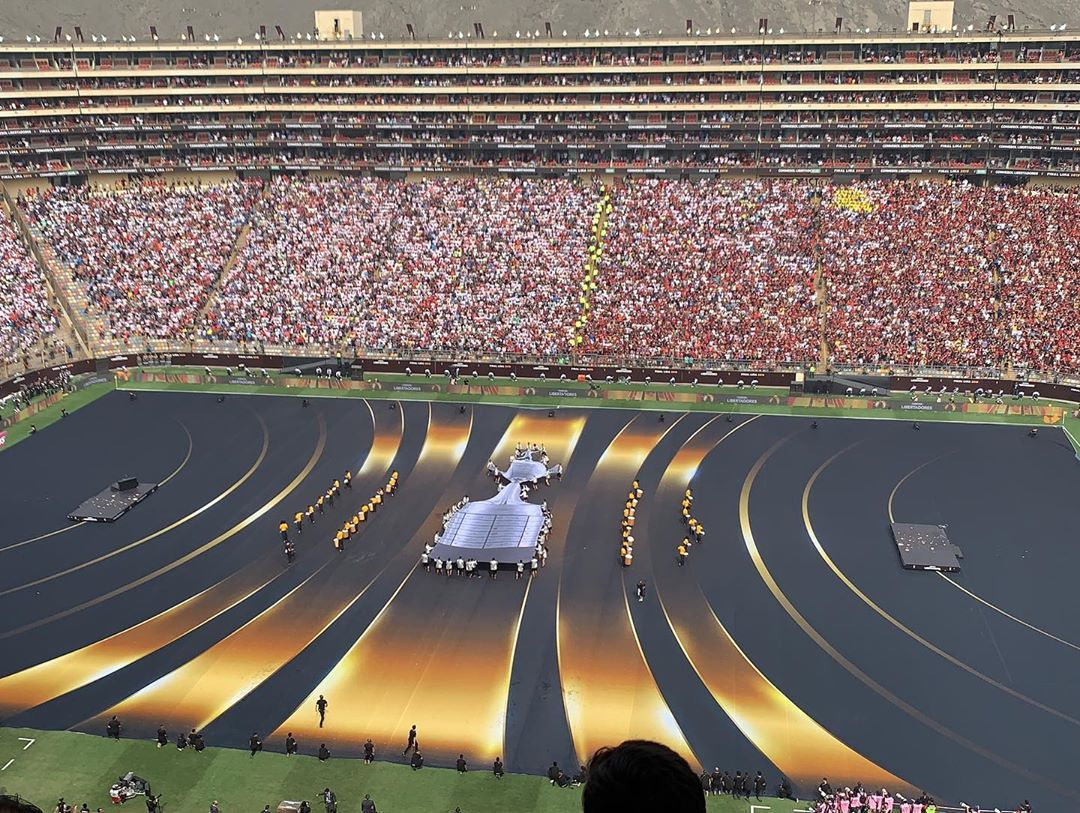
Opening ceremony of the 2019 Copa Libertadores

Between February and March of 2016, the stadium's façade was painted in cream and maroon, and in December, its two training fields were converted from natural grass to artificial turf. On 5 November 2019, it was chosen as the venue for the first single-match final of the 2019 Copa Libertadores between Club Atlético River Plate of Argentina and Flamengo of Brazil, a match that was played on 23 November 2019 and attended by 78,573 fans. On 31 May 2021, Club Universitario de Deportes unveiled a new statue dedicated to Teodoro Fernández.

Towards the end of 2022, Marathon Sports won the names of the Estadio Monumental, finally in March 2023 the club announced the change in the number of the stadium by the Estadio Monumental U Marathon, converted to the first Peruvian club by ceding the number of its stadium to a sponsor. On 9 March 2023, during the Universitario's 2–0 victory in the first round of the 2023 Copa Sudamericana, the club inaugurated a new LED lighting system, which allowed ultra-high definition television transmissions (4K) to be realized.

On 10 August 2025, the stadium was selected to host the final of the 2025 Copa Libertadores for the second time, with the match being played between Brazilian clubs Palmeiras and Flamengo.

== Facilities ==
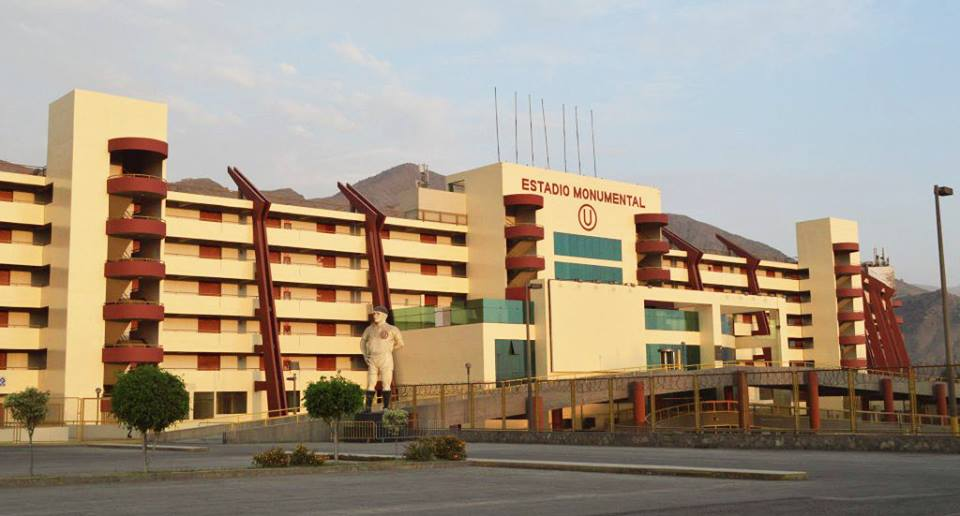
Façade of the entrance to the stadium

Located on Avenida Prolongación Javier Prado Este, the 80,093-capacity stadium and the surrounding sport complex cover an area of 186,542 m^{2} (2,007,920 sq ft). There are 3 fields; the stadium field and two training grounds. The stadium is divided into two main sections; the lower section of stands for the general public and the upper section of 6 floors of luxury boxes. The lower section of the stadium consists of four stands—known as Norte, Sur, Oriente, and Occidente (North, South, East, and West respectively)—each having its own entrance. The east and west stands are all-seaters, while the north and south stands have standing terraces. Behind the western and eastern stands, there is a handicapped zone. In the center of the western stand the Palco Oficial is situated for about 600 people, which has a private entrance and amenities such as bathrooms and a cafeteria. Together, these four stands can receive 60,000 people. The upper section consists of the luxury box suites which are 1,250 in total for 20,000 fans; the suite owners have a private parking lot.

The main field is 18 m (59 ft) below ground level and from the outside the stadium, only the luxury suites are visible. The field is 105 m × 70 m (344 ft × 230 ft) in size. Modern floodlighting was installed, with a total of 160 spotlights of 2,000 watts with four levels of illumination. Above the northern stand, an LED display electronic scoreboard stands which measures 8 m × 10 m (26 ft × 33 ft). Above the southern stand, a screen is situated that measures 10 m × 6 m (33 ft × 20 ft). Above the western stand, a surveillance room with eight security cameras monitoring the interiors and exteriors of the stadium. The field is watered by sprinkler irrigation.

The stadium has four changing rooms which are below the western stand; two of them are the main changing rooms for the main game the stadium hosts, while the other two are for teams participating in a preliminary match. The changing rooms include showers, bathrooms, dressing rooms, and massage rooms. The main changing rooms have an office for the manager of the team. There is also an anti-doping room, a referees changing room, and a chapel. Below the southern stand is a changing room for musical concert personnel.

In the western stand (Occidente) the first floor of the upper section was exclusively made for the media and press. There are 168 positions for newspaper journalists in addition to 32 cabins for radio broadcasts as well as 5 specially-made positions for television broadcasts. Two photography laboratories are available. Several rooms are also available for the press, press conferences, telecommunications, and accreditation.

== Tenants ==
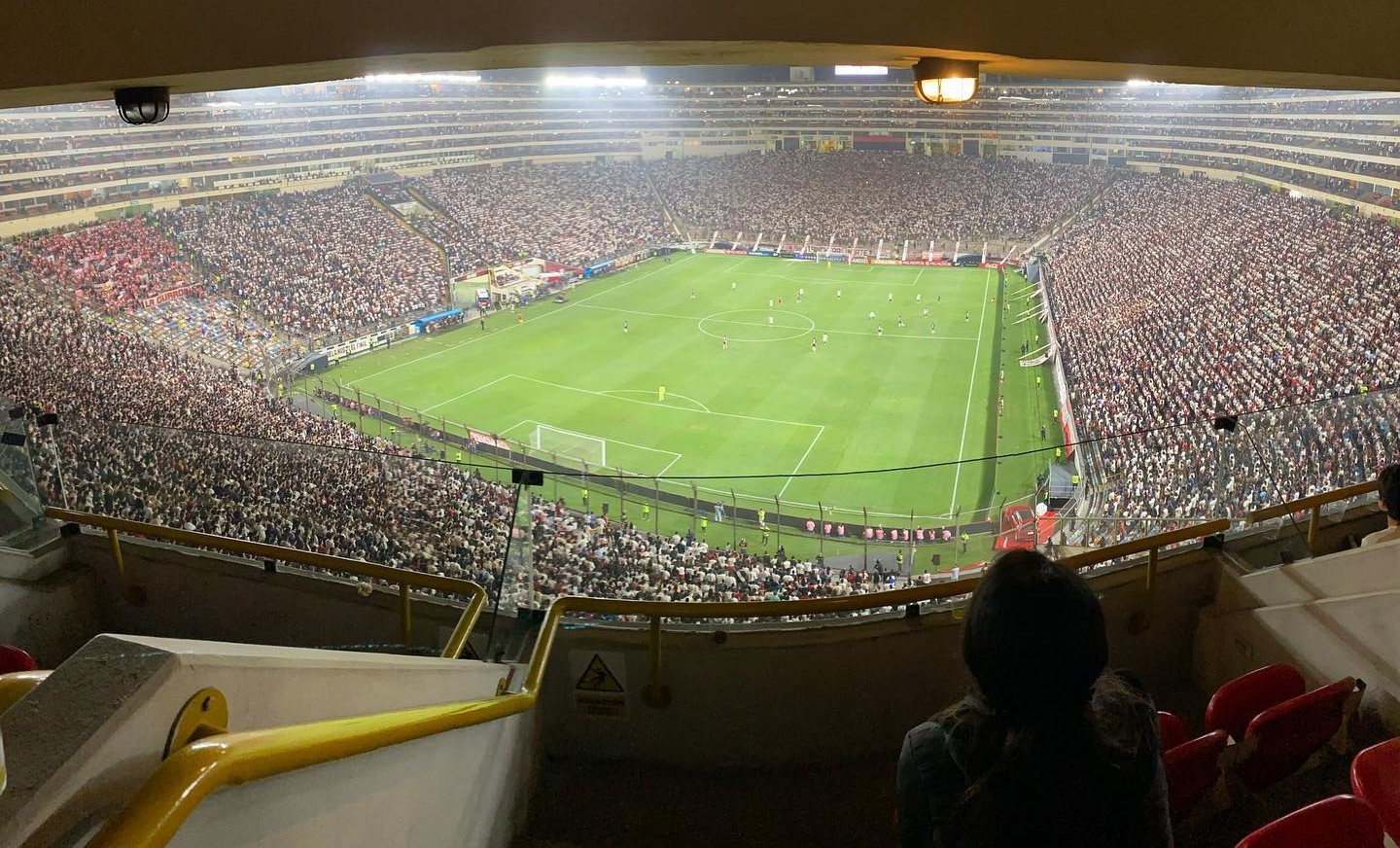
Universitario playing a match in the stadium

Universitario de Deportes is the Monumental's principal tenant as well as the owner of the entire sports complex. The football club plays its home games for domestic and international matches since its opening in 2000. The inaugural match was played on 2 July 2000 against Sporting Cristal for the local Primera División with a record attendance of 54,708 fans (not counting luxury boxes). The new stadium replaced the club's Estadio Teodoro Lolo Fernandez which now serves as the club's social headquarters in addition to a training centre. Since its opening, the most important derby of Peru has been repeatedly prohibited from being played there because of security issues. On 26 June 2002, the derby was allowed to be played for the first time at the Monumental between Universitario and Alianza Lima for the Torneo Apertura trophy. This first leg match was a 1–0 victory for Universitario; however the aftermath of the match inside and outside of stadium was disastrous leading to further prohibition of the match from the Monumental. After the derby's six-year absence from the Monumental, on 14 September 2008 the Estadio Monumental hosted a second derby after the club fought bitterly, seeking the authorities' approval to be able to host the game. This time the derby was successfully hosted without security issues and subsequently the stadium was not rejected for further derby matches in the following seasons.

The Peru national football team has been a minor tenant of the Monumental. Although the Estadio Nacional is the national team's home venue, on more than one occasion has Peru played at the Monumental. The first match Peru played at the Monumental was on 2 June 2001 against Ecuador for the 2002 FIFA World Cup Qualifiers. The match was an unfortunate 2–1 loss for the home side. A second qualifier was played later that year against Bolivia which was also their last fixture of the 2002 qualifiers which ended in a 1–1 draw. The Monumental hosted a third match for the national team in 2003, however this was only a friendly against Paraguay; the match was Peru's second loss at this stadium. Peru's fourth match at the Monumental was a new qualifying match in 2003 for the 2006 FIFA World Cup against Brazil. The match was 1–1 draw in front of 59,566 people. Due to the installation of artificial turf at the Estadio Nacional, the Estadio Monumental hosted 8 of Peru's 2010 FIFA World Cup Qualifiers. Of these 8 matches, 2 wins were achieved against Venezuela and Uruguay, both 1–0 victories.

The stadium hosted the Finalisima of the 2008 Copa Perú. This was the final stage of Peru's promotion tournament in which four teams played in six matches to gain promotion to the first division. The champion Sport Huancayo and runner-up Colegio Nacional Iquitos were promoted the first division while third place Atlético Torino and fourth place Cobresol FBC were promoted to the Segunda División.

The Monumental had a chance to be a venue for the 2004 Copa América, however conflict ignited between the club and the tournament organizers which led to the absence of this stadium from the event.

== Peru national football team records ==
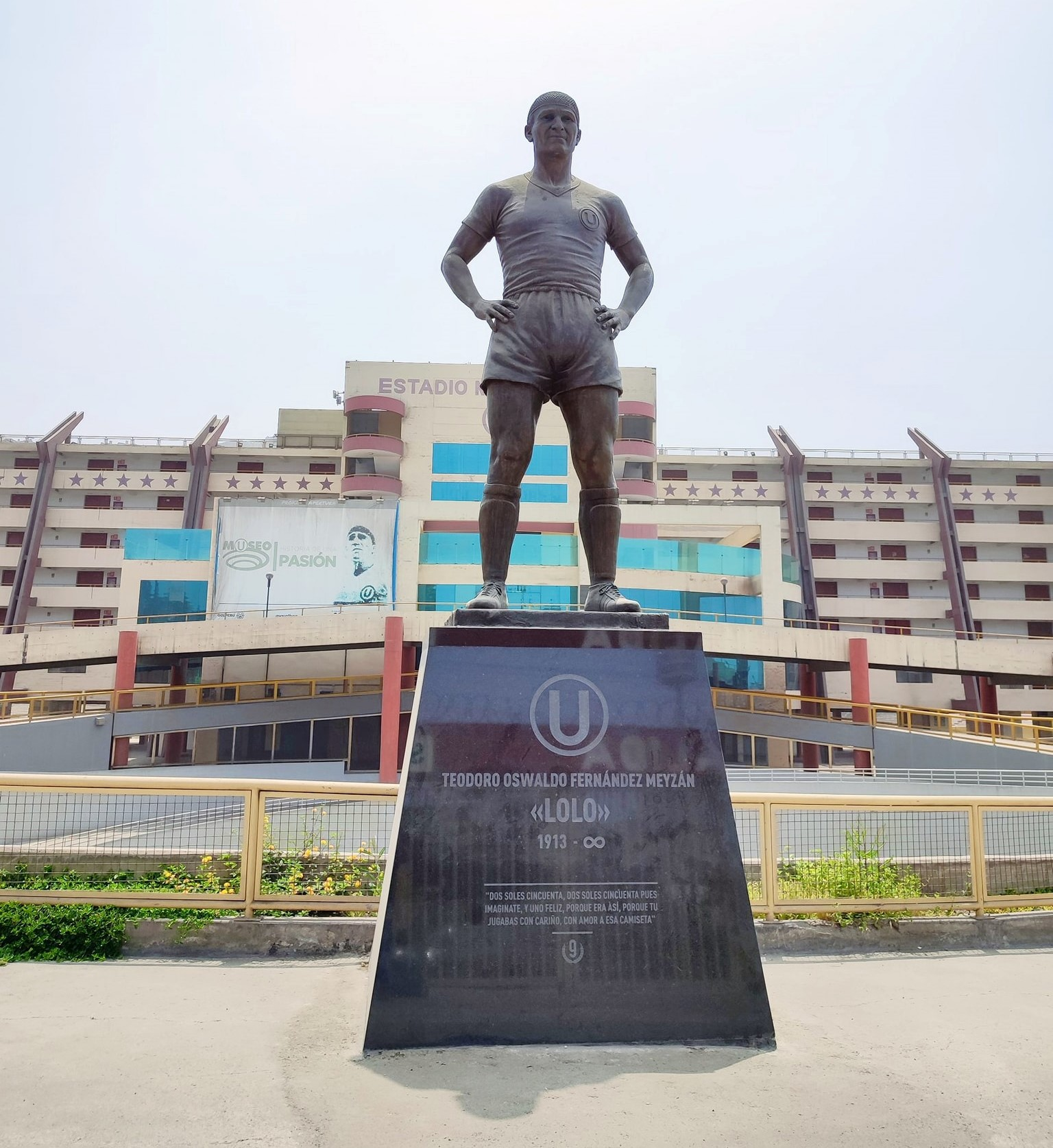
Front entrance of the stadium where the statue dedicated to Teodoro Fernández can be seen.

Date	Opponent	Result	Score	Type
2 June 2001	Ecuador	L	1–2	2002 FIFA World Cup Qualifier
14 November 2001	Bolivia	D	1–1	2002 FIFA World Cup Qualifier
30 March 2003	Paraguay	L	0–1	Friendly match
16 November 2003	Brazil	D	1–1	2006 FIFA World Cup Qualifier
4 September 2004	Argentina	L	1–3	2006 FIFA World Cup Qualifier
8 September 2007	Colombia	D	2–2	Friendly match
12 September 2007	Bolivia	W	2–0	Friendly match
13 October 2007	Paraguay	D	0–0	2010 FIFA World Cup Qualifier
19 November 2007	Brazil	D	1–1	2010 FIFA World Cup Qualifier
14 June 2008	Colombia	D	1–1	2010 FIFA World Cup Qualifier
6 September 2008	Venezuela	W	1–0	2010 FIFA World Cup Qualifier
10 September 2008	Argentina	D	1–1	2010 FIFA World Cup Qualifier
28 March 2009	Chile	L	1–3	2010 FIFA World Cup Qualifier
7 June 2009	Ecuador	L	1–2	2010 FIFA World Cup Qualifier
5 September 2009	Uruguay	W	1–0	2010 FIFA World Cup Qualifier
31 August 2017	Bolivia	W	2–1	2018 FIFA World Cup Qualifier
6 June 2019	Costa Rica	W	1–0	Friendly match
10 June 2019	Colombia	L	0–3	Friendly match
16 November 2022	Paraguay	W	1–0	Friendly match
26 March 2024	Dominican Republic	W	4–1	Friendly Match
7 June 2024	Paraguay	D	0–0	Friendly Match
15 November 2024	Chile	D	0–0	2026 FIFA World Cup Qualifier

== Notable events ==
Estadio Monumental has played host to several world-acclaimed musical artists such as:

- Sui Generis – Reunion Tour, 2001
- Alejandro Sanz – No Es Lo Mismo Tour, 2004
- Roger Waters – The Dark Side of the Moon Live, 2007
- Kylie Minogue – KylieX2008, 2008
- The Killers – Day & Age Tour, 2009
- Beyoncé – I Am... World Tour, 2010
- Guns N' Roses – Chinese Democracy Tour, 2010
- The Black Eyed Peas – The E.N.D World Tour, 2010
- Paul McCartney – Up and Coming Tour, 2011
- Miley Cyrus – Gypsy Heart Tour, 2011
- Britney Spears – Femme Fatale Tour, 2011
- Maroon 5 – Overexposed Tour, 2012
- The Rolling Stones – América Latina Olé Tour 2016, 2016
- Guns N' Roses – Not in This Lifetime... Tour, 2016
- Roger Waters – Us + Them Tour, 2018

=== Explanada del Estadio Monumental ===
Other notable events took place in an open area south of the stadium premises, commonly known as "Explanada del Estadio Monumental" and often mistakenly regarded as part of the complex; not to be confused with the south parking lot actually belonging to the stadium that also serves as a music venue for shows holding less than 40,000 people.

Depeche Mode performed at the open area on 13 October 2009, during their Tour of the Universe, in front of a crowd of 30,000 people.

=== Christian events ===
Nigerian Pastor T.B. Joshua held a two-day crusade in September 2016 which attracted nearly 100,000 over both days and made headlines in local Peruvian media.
