= 2024 Racing Club de Avellaneda season =

Racing Club de Avellaneda
2024 season
- Stadium: El Cilindro
- Primera División: 3rd
- Copa Argentina: Round of 32
- Copa de la Liga Profesional: Group stage
- Copa Sudamericana: Winner
- Top goalscorer: League: Adrián Martínez (14); All: Adrián Martínez (24)
- Average home league attendance: 42,092

The 2024 season was the 121st in the history of Racing Club de Avellaneda and the club's 10th consecutive in the top flight. They participated in the Primera División, Copa Argentina, Copa de la Liga Profesional, as well as the Copa Libertadores.

Competition began on January 27 and the season concluded on December 15.

== Competitions ==
=== Overall record ===
Competition	First match	Last match	Starting round	Final position	Record							
Competition	First match	Last match	Starting round	Final position	Pld	W	D	L	GF	GA	GD	Win %
Primera División	12 May 2024	15 December 2024	Matchday 1	3rd	27	14	4	9	42	30	+12	51.85
Copa Argentina	21 March 2024	2 May 2024	Round of 64	Round of 32	2	1	0	1	4	2	+2	50.00
Copa de la Liga Profesional	27 January 2024		Group stage	Group stage	14	7	3	4	24	11	+13	50.00
Copa Sudamericana	4 April 2024	23 November 2024	Group stage	Winner	13	10	1	2	28	8	+20	76.92
Total					56	32	8	16	98	51	+47	57.14

Last updated: 15 December 2024
Source: Competitions

=== Primera División ===
==== League table ====
Pos	Team	Pld	W	D	L	GF	GA	GD	Pts	Qualification
1	Vélez Sarsfield (C)	27	14	9	4	38	16	+22	51	Qualification for Copa Libertadores group stage
2	Talleres (C)	27	13	9	5	34	27	+7	48	
3	Racing	27	14	4	9	42	30	+12	46	
4	Huracán	27	12	10	5	28	18	+10	46	
5	River Plate	27	11	10	6	38	21	+17	43	

Source: AFA
Rules for classification: 1) points; 2) goal difference; 3) goals scored; 4) head-to-head results; 5) fair play ranking 6) drawing of lots.
(C) Champions

==== Results summary ====
Overall								Home						Away					
Pld	W	D	L	GF	GA	GD	Pts	W	D	L	GF	GA	GD	W	D	L	GF	GA	GD
11	6	2	3	18	9	+9	20	4	0	1	9	2	+7	2	2	2	9	7	+2

Last updated: 16 August 2024.

==== Results by round ====
Round	1	2	3	4	5	6	7	8	9	10
Ground	A	H	A	H	A	H	A	H	A	H
Result	D	W	W	W	L	W	L	W	D	L
Position	14	4	1	1	4	3	4	3	3	6

Updated to match(es) played on 16 August 2024. Source: Worldfootball
A = Away; H = Home; W = Win; D = Draw; L = Loss

==== Matches ====
The first four-round dates were announced on 6 May.

12 May 2024 1	Belgrano	4–4	Racing	Córdoba
17:45 UTC−3				Stadium: Gigante de Alberdi

20 May 2024 2	Racing	3–0	Argentinos Juniors	Avellaneda
21:15 UTC−3				Stadium: El Cilindro

24 May 2024 3	Tigre	0–4	Racing	Victoria
19:00 UTC−3				Stadium: Monumental de Victoria

1 June 2024 4	Racing	1–0	Deportivo Riestra	Avellaneda
				Stadium: El Cilindro

20 July 2024 6	Racing	3–0	Godoy Cruz	Avellaneda

28 July 2024 8	Racing	2–1	Unión de Santa Fe	Avellaneda
				Stadium: El Cilindro

3 August 2024 9	Huracán	0–0	Racing	Buenos Aires
20:30 UTC−3				Stadium: Tomás Adolfo Ducó

9 August 2024 10	Racing	0–1	Gimnasia La Plata	Avellaneda
21:00				Stadium: El Cilindro

16 August 2024 11	Newell's Old Boys	0–1	Racing	Rosario
21:00 UTC−3				Stadium: Marcelo Bielsa

25 August 2024 12	Racing	0–0	Independiente	Avellaneda
17:00 UTC−3				Stadium: El Cilindro

1 September 2024 13	Atlético Tucumán	1–0	Racing	Tucumán
19:00 UTC−3				Stadium: José Fierro

14 September 2024 14	Racing	2–1	Boca Juniors	Avellaneda
17:30 UTC−3				Stadium: El Cilindro

=== Copa Argentina ===
21 March 2024 Round of 64	Racing	3–0	San Martín de Burzaco	La Plata
20:15	A. Martínez 57'; Carbonero 67'; Salas 83'	Report		Stadium: Juan Carmelo Zerillo; Referee: Fernando Rapallini

2 May 2024 Round of 32	Racing	1–2	Talleres (RdE)	Quilmes
21:10	Salas 66'	Report	Duré 6'; Guzmán 90+3'	Stadium: Centenario Ciudad de Quilmes; Referee: Pablo Echavarría

=== Copa de la Liga Profesional ===
27 January 2024 1	v

=== Copa Sudamericana ===
==== Group stage ====
Pos	Team	Pld	W	D	L	GF	GA	GD	Pts	Qualification	RAC	RBB	COQ	SLU
1	(Argentina) Racing	6	5	0	1	14	3	+11	15	Advance to round of 16	—	3–0	3–0	3–0
2	(Brazil) Red Bull Bragantino	6	4	1	1	9	8	+1	13	Advance to knockout round play-offs	2–1	—	1–0	2–1
3	(Chile) Coquimbo Unido	6	1	2	3	3	7	−4	5		1–2	1–1	—	1–0
4	(Paraguay) Sportivo Luqueño	6	0	1	5	3	11	−8	1		0–2	2–3	0–0	—

Source: CONMEBOL

4 April 2024 1	Sportivo Luqueño (Paraguay)	0–2	(Argentina) Racing	Asunción, Paraguay
20:00 UTC−4				Stadium: Estadio Defensores del Chaco

10 April 2024 2	Racing (Argentina)	3–0	(Brazil) Red Bull Bragantino	Avellaneda
19:00 UTC−3				Stadium: Estadio Presidente Perón

24 April 2024 3	Coquimbo Unido (Chile)	1–2	(Argentina) Racing	Coquimbo, Chile
18:00 UTC−4				Stadium: Francisco Sánchez Rumoroso

9 May 2024 4	Red Bull Bragantino (Brazil)	2–1	(Argentina) Racing	Bragança Paulista, Brazil
21:00 UTC−3				Stadium: Estádio Nabi Abi Chedid

16 May 2024 5	Racing (Argentina)	3–0	(Chile) Coquimbo Unido	Avellaneda
19:00 UTC−3				Stadium: Estadio Presidente Perón

28 May 2024 6	Racing (Argentina)	3–0	(Paraguay) Sportivo Luqueño	Avellaneda
21:30 UTC−3				Stadium: Estadio Presidente Perón

==== Round of 16 ====
13 August 2024 First leg	Huachipato (Chile)	0–2	(Argentina) Racing	Viña del Mar, Chile
18:00 UTC−4				Stadium: Estadio Sausalito; Referee: Roberto Pérez Gutierrez (Peru)

20 August 2024 Second leg	Racing (Argentina)	6–1 (8–1 agg.)	(Chile) Huachipato	Avellaneda
19:00 UTC−3				Stadium: Estadio Presidente Perón; Referee: Juan Gabriel Benítez (Paraguay)

==== Quarter-finals ====
19 September 2024 First leg	Athletico Paranaense (Brazil)	1–0	(Argentina) Racing	Arena da Baixada, Curitiba
21:30 UTC−3	João Cruz 38'	Report		Attendance: 24,214; Referee: Cristian Garay (Chile)

26 September 2024 Second leg	Racing (Argentina)	4–1	(Brazil) Athletico Paranaense	Estadio Presidente Juan Domingo Perón, Avellaneda
21:30 UTC−3				Referee: Andrés Rojas (Colombia)
