= 2024 Copa Sudamericana final stages =

The 2024 Copa Sudamericana final stages were played from 16 July to 23 November 2024. A total of 24 teams competed in the final stages to decide the champions of the 2024 Copa Sudamericana, with the final played at Estadio General Pablo Rojas in Asunción, Paraguay.

== Qualified teams ==
The winners and runners-up of each of the eight groups in the Copa Sudamericana group stage as well as the third-placed teams of each of the eight groups in the Copa Libertadores group stage advanced to the final stages. The eight Copa Sudamericana group runners-up faced the eight Copa Libertadores group third-placed teams in the knockout round play-offs, whilst the eight Copa Sudamericana group winners directly advanced to the round of 16.

=== Copa Sudamericana group stage winners and runners-up ===
Group	Winners	Runners-up
A	(Colombia) Independiente Medellín	(Bolivia) Always Ready
B	(Brazil) Cruzeiro	(Ecuador) Universidad Católica
C	(Argentina) Belgrano	(Brazil) Internacional
D	(Brazil) Fortaleza	(Argentina) Boca Juniors
E	(Paraguay) Sportivo Ameliano	(Brazil) Athletico Paranaense
F	(Brazil) Corinthians	(Uruguay) Racing
G	(Argentina) Lanús	(Brazil) Cuiabá
H	(Argentina) Racing	(Brazil) Red Bull Bragantino

=== Copa Libertadores group stage third-placed teams ===
Group	Third-placed teams
A	(Paraguay) Cerro Porteño
B	(Ecuador) Barcelona
C	(Chile) Huachipato
D	(Ecuador) LDU Quito
E	(Chile) Palestino
F	(Ecuador) Independiente del Valle
G	(Argentina) Rosario Central
H	(Paraguay) Libertad

=== Seeding ===
Seed	Grp	Team	Pld	W	D	L	GF	GA	GD	Pts	Qualification
1	SH1	(Argentina) Racing	6	5	0	1	14	3	+11	15	Round of 16
2	SF1	(Brazil) Corinthians	6	4	1	1	14	2	+12	13	Round of 16
3	SA1	(Colombia) Independiente Medellín	6	4	1	1	16	7	+9	13	Round of 16
4	SG1	(Argentina) Lanús	6	4	1	1	12	3	+9	13	Round of 16
5	SD1	(Brazil) Fortaleza	6	4	1	1	15	8	+7	13	Round of 16
6	SE1	(Paraguay) Sportivo Ameliano	6	4	1	1	9	5	+4	13	Round of 16
7	SB1	(Brazil) Cruzeiro	6	3	3	0	8	3	+5	12	Round of 16
8	SC1	(Argentina) Belgrano	6	3	3	0	7	3	+4	12	Round of 16
9	SH2	(Brazil) Red Bull Bragantino	6	4	1	1	9	8	+1	13	Play-off Match A
10	SE2	(Brazil) Athletico Paranaense	6	4	0	2	17	5	+12	12	Play-off Match B
11	SG2	(Brazil) Cuiabá	6	3	3	0	9	3	+6	12	Play-off Match C
12	SB2	(Ecuador) Universidad Católica	6	3	2	1	8	2	+6	11	Play-off Match D
13	SD2	(Argentina) Boca Juniors	6	3	2	1	10	6	+4	11	Play-off Match E
14	SA2	(Bolivia) Always Ready	6	3	2	1	10	7	+3	11	Play-off Match F
15	SC2	(Brazil) Internacional	6	3	2	1	6	3	+3	11	Play-off Match G
16	SF2	(Uruguay) Racing	6	3	2	1	10	8	+2	11	Play-off Match H
17	LC	(Chile) Huachipato	6	2	2	2	7	9	−2	8	Play-off Match H
18	LG	(Argentina) Rosario Central	6	2	1	3	8	7	+1	7	Play-off Match G
19	LD	(Ecuador) LDU Quito	6	2	1	3	6	6	0	7	Play-off Match F
20	LF	(Ecuador) Independiente del Valle	6	2	1	3	8	9	−1	7	Play-off Match E
21	LH	(Paraguay) Libertad	6	2	1	3	7	8	−1	7	Play-off Match D
22	LE	(Chile) Palestino	6	2	1	3	6	11	−5	7	Play-off Match C
23	LA	(Paraguay) Cerro Porteño	6	1	3	2	4	5	−1	6	Play-off Match B
24	LB	(Ecuador) Barcelona	6	1	3	2	6	9	−3	6	Play-off Match A

Source: CONMEBOL Sudamericana, CONMEBOL Libertadores
Rules for classification: 1) Higher position in group; 2) Points; 3) Goal difference; 4) Goals scored; 5) Away goals scored; 6) CONMEBOL ranking (Regulations Article 2.4.3).

== Format ==
Starting from the knockout round play-offs, the teams played a single-elimination tournament with the following rules:

- In the knockout round play-offs, round of 16, quarter-finals and semi-finals, each tie was played on a home-and-away two-legged basis, with the higher-seeded team hosting the second leg (Regulations Article 2.2.3). If tied on aggregate, extra time was not played, and a penalty shoot-out was used to determine the winners (Regulations Article 2.4.4).
- The final was played as a single match at a venue pre-selected by CONMEBOL, with the higher-seeded team designated as the "home" team for administrative purposes (Regulations Article 2.2.6). If tied after regulation, 30 minutes of extra time were played. If still tied after extra time, a penalty shoot-out was used to determine the winners (Regulations Article 2.4.5).

== Draw ==
The draw for the round of 16 was held on 3 June 2024, 12:00 PYT (UTC−4) in Asunción, Paraguay. For the round of 16, the 16 teams were drawn into eight ties (A–H) between a Copa Sudamericana group winner (Pot 1) and a knockout round play-offs winner (Pot 2), with the group winners hosting the second leg. Teams from the same association or the same group could be drawn into the same tie (Regulations Article 2.2.3.2).

== Bracket ==
The bracket starting from the round of 16 was determined as follows:

Round	Matchups
Knockout round play-offs	(Group runners-up host second leg, matchups pre-determined): Play-offs Match A: Seed 9 vs. Seed 24; Play-offs Match B: Seed 10 vs. Seed 23; Play-offs Match C: Seed 11 vs. Seed 22; Play-offs Match D: Seed 12 vs. Seed 21; Play-offs Match E: Seed 13 vs. Seed 20; Play-offs Match F: Seed 14 vs. Seed 19; Play-offs Match G: Seed 15 vs. Seed 18; Play-offs Match H: Seed 16 vs. Seed 17
Round of 16	(Group winners host second leg, matchups decided by draw): Match A; Match B; Match C; Match D; Match E; Match F; Match G; Match H
Quarter-finals	(Higher-seeded team host second leg): Match S1: Winner A vs. Winner H; Match S2: Winner B vs. Winner G; Match S3: Winner C vs. Winner F; Match S4: Winner D vs. Winner E
Semi-finals	(Higher-seeded team host second leg): Match F1: Winner S1 vs. Winner S4; Match F2: Winner S2 vs. Winner S3
Final	(Higher-seeded team designated as "home" team): Winner F1 vs. Winner F2

The bracket was decided based on the round of 16 draw, which was held on 3 June 2024.

Knockout round play-offs
18	(Argentina) Rosario Central	1	1	2
15	(Brazil) Internacional	0	1	1
24	(Ecuador) Barcelona	1	2	3
9	(Brazil) Red Bull Bragantino	1	3	4
23	(Paraguay) Cerro Porteño	1	1	2
10	(Brazil) Athletico Paranaense	1	2	3
17	(Chile) Huachipato (p)	2	1	3 (3)
16	(Uruguay) Racing	3	0	3 (0)
21	(Paraguay) Libertad	2	1	3
12	(Ecuador) Universidad Católica	0	1	1
20	(Ecuador) Independiente del Valle	0	0	0
13	(Argentina) Boca Juniors	0	1	1
19	(Ecuador) LDU Quito	3	1	4
14	(Bolivia) Always Ready	0	3	3
22	(Chile) Palestino	1	2	3
11	(Brazil) Cuiabá	1	1	2

Round of 16
18	(Argentina) Rosario Central	1	1	2
5	(Brazil) Fortaleza	1	3	4
9	(Brazil) Red Bull Bragantino	1	2	3 (4)
2	(Brazil) Corinthians (p)	2	1	3 (5)
10	(Brazil) Athletico Paranaense	2	2	4
8	(Argentina) Belgrano	1	0	1
17	(Chile) Huachipato	0	1	1
1	(Argentina) Racing	2	6	8
21	(Paraguay) Libertad (p)	1	0	1 (4)
6	(Paraguay) Sportivo Ameliano	1	0	1 (3)
13	(Argentina) Boca Juniors	1	1	2 (4)
7	(Brazil) Cruzeiro (p)	0	2	2 (5)
19	(Ecuador) LDU Quito	1	1	2
4	(Argentina) Lanús	2	3	5
15	(Chile) Palestino	2	0	2
3	(Colombia) Independiente Medellín	2	4	6

Quarter-finals
5	(Brazil) Fortaleza	0	0	0
2	(Brazil) Corinthians	2	3	5
10	(Brazil) Athletico Paranaense	1	1	2
1	(Argentina) Racing	0	4	4
21	(Paraguay) Libertad	0	1	1
7	(Brazil) Cruzeiro	2	1	3
4	(Argentina) Lanús (p)	0	1	1 (6)
3	(Colombia) Independiente Medellín	0	1	1 (5)

Semi-finals
2	(Brazil) Corinthians	2	1	3
1	(Argentina) Racing	2	2	4
7	(Brazil) Cruzeiro	1	1	2
4	(Argentina) Lanús	1	0	1

Final
23 November – Asunción
1	(Argentina) Racing	3
7	(Brazil) Cruzeiro	1

== Knockout round play-offs ==
=== Summary ===
The first legs were played on 16–18 July, and the second legs were played on 23–25 July 2024.

Team 1	Agg.	Team 2	1st leg	2nd leg
Barcelona (Ecuador)	3–4	(Brazil) Red Bull Bragantino	1–1	2–3
Cerro Porteño (Paraguay)	2–3	(Brazil) Athletico Paranaense	1–1	1–2
Palestino (Chile)	3–2	(Brazil) Cuiabá	1–1	2–1
Libertad (Paraguay)	3–1	(Ecuador) Universidad Católica	2–0	1–1
Independiente del Valle (Ecuador)	0–1	(Argentina) Boca Juniors	0–0	0–1
LDU Quito (Ecuador)	4–3	(Bolivia) Always Ready	3–0	1–3
Rosario Central (Argentina)	2–1	(Brazil) Internacional	1–0	1–1
Huachipato (Chile)	3–3 (3–0 p)	(Uruguay) Racing	2–3	1–0

=== Matches ===
17 July 2024 (Note: Both legs of Play-off Match A, originally scheduled for 16 and 23 July, were moved to 17 and 24 July.)
19:30 UTC−5

Barcelona (Ecuador)	1–1	(Brazil) Red Bull Bragantino
Corozo 31'	Report	Helinho 18'

Estadio Monumental Isidro Romero Carbo, Guayaquil
Attendance: 6,767
Referee: Maximiliano Ramírez (Argentina)
24 July 2024
21:30 UTC−3

Red Bull Bragantino (Brazil)	3–2	(Ecuador) Barcelona
Borbas 22'; Lincoln 46'; Jhon Jhon 86'	Report	Preciado 7'; Oyola 44'

Estádio Nabi Abi Chedid, Bragança Paulista
Attendance: 4,368
Referee: Alexis Herrera (Venezuela)

Red Bull Bragantino won 4–3 on aggregate and advanced to the round of 16.

18 July 2024
20:30 UTC−4

Cerro Porteño (Paraguay)	1–1	(Brazil) Athletico Paranaense
Benítez 33'	Report	Christian 69'

Estadio General Pablo Rojas, Asunción
Attendance: 12,702
Referee: Esteban Ostojich (Uruguay)
25 July 2024
21:30 UTC−3

Athletico Paranaense (Brazil)	2–1	(Paraguay) Cerro Porteño
Mastriani 3'; Cuello 59'	Report	Fernández 68'

Arena da Baixada, Curitiba
Attendance: 28,196
Referee: Felipe González (Chile)

Athletico Paranaense won 3–2 on aggregate and advanced to the round of 16.

18 July 2024
18:00 UTC−4

Palestino (Chile)	1–1	(Brazil) Cuiabá
Linares 32'	Report	Deyverson 61'

Estadio Ester Roa, Concepción (Note: Palestino played their knockout round play-off home match at Estadio Ester Roa, Concepción instead of their regular stadium Estadio Municipal de La Cisterna, Santiago which did not meet CONMEBOL requirements.)
Referee: Roberto Pérez (Peru)
25 July 2024
18:00 UTC−4

Cuiabá (Brazil)	1–2	(Chile) Palestino
André Luis 77'	Report	Marabel 8'; Sosa 61'

Arena Pantanal, Cuiabá
Attendance: 6,004
Referee: Gery Vargas (Bolivia)

Palestino won 3–2 on aggregate and advanced to the round of 16.

17 July 2024
18:00 UTC−4

Libertad (Paraguay)	2–0	(Ecuador) Universidad Católica
Ó. Cardozo 49'; Sanabria 74'	Report

Estadio Defensores del Chaco, Asunción (Note: Libertad played their home matches at Estadio Defensores del Chaco, Asunción instead of their regular stadium Estadio La Huerta, Asunción which did not meet CONMEBOL requirements.)
Referee: Paulo Zanovelli (Brazil)
24 July 2024
17:00 UTC−5

Universidad Católica (Ecuador)	1–1	(Paraguay) Libertad
Fajardo 6'	Report	Ó. Cardozo 90+1'

Estadio Olímpico Atahualpa, Quito
Attendance: 4,201
Referee: Andrés Rojas (Colombia)

Libertad won 3–1 on aggregate and advanced to the round of 16.

17 July 2024
19:30 UTC−5

Independiente del Valle (Ecuador)	0–0	(Argentina) Boca Juniors
	Report

Estadio Banco Guayaquil, Quito (Note: The Independiente del Valle v Boca Juniors match, originally scheduled at Estadio Rodrigo Paz Delgado, Quito was moved to Independiente del Valle's regular stadium Estadio Banco Guayaquil, Quito.)
Attendance: 8,083
Referee: Felipe González (Chile)
24 July 2024
21:30 UTC−3

Boca Juniors (Argentina)	1–0	(Ecuador) Independiente del Valle
Cavani 39'	Report

La Bombonera, Buenos Aires
Attendance: 46,943
Referee: Andrés Matonte (Uruguay)

Boca Juniors won 1–0 on aggregate and advanced to the round of 16.

18 July 2024
19:30 UTC−5

LDU Quito (Ecuador)	3–0	(Bolivia) Always Ready
Arce 16'; Adé 27'; Julio 53'	Report

Estadio Rodrigo Paz Delgado, Quito
Attendance: 21,546
Referee: Kevin Ortega (Peru)
25 July 2024
20:30 UTC−4

Always Ready (Bolivia)	3–1	(Ecuador) LDU Quito
Terrazas 1'; Martínes 84'; Carabalí 88'	Report	Alzugaray 50'

Estadio Municipal de Villa Ingenio, El Alto
Attendance: 4,269
Referee: Flavio de Souza (Brazil)

LDU Quito won 4–3 on aggregate and advanced to the round of 16.

16 July 2024
21:30 UTC−3

Rosario Central (Argentina)	1–0	(Brazil) Internacional
Campaz 49'	Report

Estadio Gigante de Arroyito, Rosario
Attendance: 21,907
Referee: Cristian Garay (Chile)
23 July 2024
21:30 UTC−3

Internacional (Brazil)	1–1	(Argentina) Rosario Central
Alan Patrick 49'	Report	Sández 20'

Estádio Beira-Rio, Porto Alegre
Attendance: 31,646
Referee: Gustavo Tejera (Uruguay)

Rosario Central won 2–1 on aggregate and advanced to the round of 16.

16 July 2024
18:00 UTC−4

Huachipato (Chile)	2–3	(Uruguay) Racing
Martínez 4', 63'	Report	Cotugno 31', 49'; Nandín 38'

Estadio Ester Roa, Concepción (Note: Huachipato played their knockout round play-off home match at Estadio Ester Roa, Concepción instead of their regular stadium Estadio Huachipato-CAP Acero, Talcahuano which did not meet CONMEBOL requirements for this round.)
Attendance: 2,503
Referee: Augusto Aragón (Ecuador)
23 July 2024
19:00 UTC−3

Racing (Uruguay)	0–1	(Chile) Huachipato
	Report	Martínez 9'
Penalties
Silveira (penalty missed); Nandín (penalty missed); Rodríguez (penalty missed)	0–3	(penalty scored) Montes; (penalty scored) Palmezano; (penalty scored) J. Gutiérrez

Estadio Centenario, Montevideo (Note: Racing (URU) played their home match at Estadio Centenario, Montevideo instead of their regular stadium Estadio Osvaldo Roberto, Montevideo which did not meet CONMEBOL requirements.)
Attendance: 1,428
Referee: Juan Benítez (Paraguay)

Tied 3–3 on aggregate, Huachipato won on penalties and advanced to the round of 16.

== Round of 16 ==
=== Summary ===
The first legs were played on 13–15 August, and the second legs were played on 20–22 August 2024.

Team 1	Agg.	Team 2	1st leg	2nd leg
Rosario Central (Argentina)	2–4	(Brazil) Fortaleza	1–1	1–3
Libertad (Paraguay)	1–1 (4–3 p)	(Paraguay) Sportivo Ameliano	1–1	0–0
LDU Quito (Ecuador)	2–5	(Argentina) Lanús	1–2	1–3
Huachipato (Chile)	1–8	(Argentina) Racing	0–2	1–6
Athletico Paranaense (Brazil)	4–1	(Argentina) Belgrano	2–1	2–0
Palestino (Chile)	2–6	(Colombia) Independiente Medellín	2–2	0–4
Boca Juniors (Argentina)	2–2 (4–5 p)	(Brazil) Cruzeiro	1–0	1–2
Red Bull Bragantino (Brazil)	3–3 (4–5 p)	(Brazil) Corinthians	1–2	2–1

=== Matches ===
14 August 2024
19:00 UTC−3

Rosario Central (Argentina)	1–1	(Brazil) Fortaleza
Sández 6'	Report	Marinho 2'

Estadio Gigante de Arroyito, Rosario
Attendance: 14,360
Referee: Alexis Herrera (Venezuela)
21 August 2024
19:00 UTC−3

Fortaleza (Brazil)	3–1	(Argentina) Rosario Central
Lucero 53'; Yago Pikachu 78'; Lucas Sasha 90+2'	Report	Mallo 48'

Castelão, Fortaleza
Attendance: 50,135
Referee: Esteban Ostojich (Uruguay)

Fortaleza won 4–2 on aggregate and advanced to the quarter-finals (Match S1).

15 August 2024
18:00 UTC−4

Libertad (Paraguay)	1–1	(Paraguay) Sportivo Ameliano
Espinoza 58'	Report	Samudio 23'

Estadio Defensores del Chaco, Asunción
Attendance: 5,463
Referee: Maximiliano Ramírez (Argentina)
22 August 2024
18:00 UTC−4

Sportivo Ameliano (Paraguay)	0–0	(Paraguay) Libertad
	Report
Penalties
Paredes (penalty scored); Valdez (penalty scored); Salinas (penalty missed); Aranda (penalty scored); González (penalty missed); Maiz (penalty missed)	3–4	(penalty missed) Ó. Cardozo; (penalty scored) Sanabria; (penalty scored) Espinoza; (penalty scored) Melgarejo; (penalty missed) Riveros; (penalty scored) Franco

Estadio Defensores del Chaco, Asunción (Note: Sportivo Ameliano played their home match at Estadio Defensores del Chaco, Asunción instead of their regular stadium Estadio José Tomás Silva, Asunción which did not meet CONMEBOL requirements.)
Attendance: 2,572
Referee: Augusto Aragón (Ecuador)

Tied 1–1 on aggregate, Libertad won on penalties and advanced to the quarter-finals (Match S2).

14 August 2024
19:30 UTC−5

LDU Quito (Ecuador)	1–2	(Argentina) Lanús
Arce 14'	Report	Pérez 23'; Moreno 45+1'

Estadio Rodrigo Paz Delgado, Quito
Attendance: 18,662
Referee: Juan Benítez (Paraguay)
21 August 2024
21:30 UTC−3

Lanús (Argentina)	3–1	(Ecuador) LDU Quito
Bou 9'; Izquierdoz 78'; Acosta 89'	Report	Arce 37'

Estadio Ciudad de Lanús, Lanús
Attendance: 5,899
Referee: Kevin Ortega (Peru)

Lanús won 5–2 on aggregate and advanced to the quarter-finals (Match S3).

13 August 2024
18:00 UTC−4

Huachipato (Chile)	0–2	(Argentina) Racing
	Report	A. Martínez 32'; Quintero 89' (pen.)

Estadio Sausalito, Viña del Mar (Note: Huachipato played their round of 16 home match at Estadio Sausalito, Viña del Mar instead of their regular stadium Estadio Huachipato-CAP Acero, Talcahuano which did not meet CONMEBOL requirements for this round.)
Attendance: 1,992
Referee: Roberto Pérez (Peru)
20 August 2024
19:00 UTC−3

Racing (Argentina)	6–1	(Chile) Huachipato
B. Rodríguez 10'; A. Martínez 26'; Carbonero 31', 45+3'; Di Cesare 51'; Almendra 55'	Report	Palmezano 48' (pen.)

Estadio Presidente Perón, Avellaneda
Referee: Juan Benítez (Paraguay)

Racing won 8–1 on aggregate and advanced to the quarter-finals (Match S4).

15 August 2024
19:00 UTC−3

Athletico Paranaense (Brazil)	2–1	(Argentina) Belgrano
Erick 41'; Christian 62'	Report	Jara 1'

Arena da Baixada, Curitiba
Attendance: 27,275
Referee: Gery Vargas (Bolivia)
22 August 2024
19:00 UTC−3

Belgrano (Argentina)	0–2	(Brazil) Athletico Paranaense
	Report	Mastriani 54'; Di Yorio 89'

Estadio Mario Alberto Kempes, Córdoba (Note: Belgrano played their home match at Estadio Mario Alberto Kempes, Córdoba instead of their regular stadium Estadio Julio César Villagra, Córdoba which did not meet CONMEBOL requirements.)
Attendance: 40,296
Referee: Carlos Paul Benítez (Paraguay)

Athletico Paranaense won 4–1 on aggregate and advanced to the quarter-finals (Match S4).

14 August 2024
20:30 UTC−4

Palestino (Chile)	2–2	(Colombia) Independiente Medellín
Román 48'; Linares 50'	Report	Varela 41', 90+3'

Estadio Nacional Julio Martínez Prádanos, Santiago (Note: Palestino played their round of 16 home match at Estadio Nacional Julio Martínez Prádanos, Santiago instead of their regular stadium Estadio Municipal de La Cisterna, Santiago which did not meet CONMEBOL requirements.)
Attendance: 12,284
Referee: Augusto Aragón (Ecuador)
21 August 2024
19:30 UTC−5

Independiente Medellín (Colombia)	4–0	(Chile) Palestino
Román 29' (o.g.); Alvarado 42'; L. Chaverra 66' (pen.); Perlaza 67'	Report

Estadio Hernán Ramírez Villegas, Pereira (Note: Independiente Medellín played their round of 16 home match at Estadio Hernán Ramírez Villegas, Pereira instead of their regular stadium Estadio Atanasio Girardot, Medellín which was unavailable as it was reserved for the 2024 FIFA U-20 Women's World Cup.)
Attendance: 9,384
Referee: Flavio de Souza (Brazil)

Independiente Medellín won 6–2 on aggregate and advanced to the quarter-finals (Match S3).

15 August 2024
21:30 UTC−3

Boca Juniors (Argentina)	1–0	(Brazil) Cruzeiro
Cavani 65'	Report

La Bombonera, Buenos Aires
Attendance: 43,973
Referee: Jesús Valenzuela (Venezuela)
22 August 2024
21:30 UTC−3

Cruzeiro (Brazil)	2–1	(Argentina) Boca Juniors
Matheus Henrique 9'; Walace 21'	Report	Giménez 48'
Penalties
William (penalty scored); Matheus Henrique (penalty scored); Marlon Xavier (penalty scored); Dinenno (penalty scored); Barreal (penalty scored)	5–4	(penalty scored) Rojo; (penalty scored) Lema; (penalty scored) Blanco; (penalty scored) Figal; (penalty missed) Merentiel

Mineirão, Belo Horizonte
Attendance: 58,323
Referee: Wilmar Roldán (Colombia)

Tied 2–2 on aggregate, Cruzeiro won on penalties and advanced to the quarter-finals (Match S2).

13 August 2024
21:30 UTC−3

Red Bull Bragantino (Brazil)	1–2	(Brazil) Corinthians
Helinho 56'	Report	Giovane 6'; Talles Magno 14'

Estádio Santa Cruz, Ribeirão Preto (Note: Red Bull Bragantino played their round of 16 home match at Estádio Santa Cruz, Ribeirão Preto instead of their regular stadium Estádio Nabi Abi Chedid, Bragança Paulista which did not meet CONMEBOL requirements for this round.)
Attendance: 11,674
Referee: Felipe González (Chile) (Note: Referee Piero Maza from Chile, who was originally assigned to the Red Bull Bragantino v Corinthians match, was replaced due to injury by Felipe González, also from Chile.)
20 August 2024
21:30 UTC−3

Corinthians (Brazil)	1–2	(Brazil) Red Bull Bragantino
Garro 24'	Report	Eduardo Sasha 72'; Luan Cândido 76'
Penalties
Garro (penalty scored); Ramalho (penalty missed); Matheus Bidu (penalty scored); Pedro Henrique (penalty scored); Wesley (penalty scored); Ryan (penalty missed); Gustavo Henrique (penalty scored)	5–4	(penalty scored) Eduardo Sasha; (penalty scored) Lucas Evangelista; (penalty scored) Luan Cândido; (penalty scored) Borbas; (penalty missed) Gustavinho; (penalty missed) Douglas Mendes; (penalty missed) Guilherme

Neo Química Arena, São Paulo
Attendance: 42,312
Referee: Andrés Rojas (Colombia)

Tied 3–3 on aggregate, Corinthians won on penalties and advanced to the quarter-finals (Match S1).

== Quarter-finals ==
=== Summary ===
The first legs were played on 17–19 September, and the second legs were played on 24–26 September 2024.

Team 1	Agg.	Team 2	1st leg	2nd leg
Fortaleza (Brazil)	0–5	(Brazil) Corinthians	0–2	0–3
Libertad (Paraguay)	1–3	(Brazil) Cruzeiro	0–2	1–1
Lanús (Argentina)	1–1 (6–5 p)	(Colombia) Independiente Medellín	0–0	1–1
Athletico Paranaense (Brazil)	2–4	(Argentina) Racing	1–0	1–4

=== Matches ===
17 September 2024
21:30 UTC−3

Fortaleza (Brazil)	0–2	(Brazil) Corinthians
	Report	Coronado 39'; Yuri Alberto 90'

Castelão, Fortaleza
Attendance: 46,617
Referee: Darío Herrera (Argentina)
24 September 2024
21:30 UTC−3

Corinthians (Brazil)	3–0	(Brazil) Fortaleza
Romero 55'; Coronado 59'; Pedro Henrique 81'	Report

Neo Química Arena, São Paulo
Attendance: 44,680
Referee: Piero Maza (Chile)

Corinthians won 5–0 on aggregate and advanced to the semi-finals (Match F1).

19 September 2024
20:30 UTC−4

Libertad (Paraguay)	0–2	(Brazil) Cruzeiro
	Report	Kaio Jorge 19'; Díaz 45+3'

Estadio Defensores del Chaco, Asunción
Referee: Gustavo Tejera (Uruguay)
26 September 2024
21:30 UTC−3

Cruzeiro (Brazil)	1–1	(Paraguay) Libertad
Kaio Jorge 12'	Report	Santa Cruz 72'

Mineirão, Belo Horizonte
Attendance: 52,974
Referee: Felipe González (Chile)

Cruzeiro won 3–1 on aggregate and advanced to the semi-finals (Match F2).

18 September 2024
21:30 UTC−3

Lanús (Argentina)	0–0	(Colombia) Independiente Medellín
	Report

Estadio Ciudad de Lanús, Lanús
Attendance: 9,547
Referee: Wilton Sampaio (Brazil)
25 September 2024
19:30 UTC−5

Independiente Medellín (Colombia)	1–1	(Argentina) Lanús
García 61'	Report	Londoño 39' (o.g.)
Penalties
L. Chaverra (penalty scored); F. Chaverra (penalty scored); Lima (penalty missed); Sandoval (penalty scored); Aja (penalty scored); Fory (penalty scored); Mosquera (penalty missed)	5–6	(penalty scored) Bou; (penalty missed) Izquierdoz; (penalty scored) Salvio; (penalty scored) Soler; (penalty scored) Peña Biafore; (penalty scored) Torres; (penalty scored) M. Moreno

Estadio Atanasio Girardot, Medellín
Attendance: 25,923
Referee: Alexis Herrera (Venezuela)

Tied 1–1 on aggregate, Lanús won on penalties and advanced to the semi-finals (Match F2).

19 September 2024
21:30 UTC−3

Athletico Paranaense (Brazil)	1–0	(Argentina) Racing
João Cruz 38'	Report

Arena da Baixada, Curitiba
Attendance: 24,214
Referee: Cristian Garay (Chile)
26 September 2024
21:30 UTC−3

Racing (Argentina)	4–1	(Brazil) Athletico Paranaense
Almendra 1'; A. Martínez 23'; R. Martínez 42'; Martirena 77'	Report	Nikão 47'

Estadio Presidente Perón, Avellaneda
Attendance: 28,578
Referee: Andrés Rojas (Colombia)

Racing won 4–2 on aggregate and advanced to the semi-finals (Match F1).

== Semi-finals ==
=== Summary ===
The first legs were played on 23 and 24 October, and the second legs were played on 30 and 31 October 2024.

Team 1	Agg.	Team 2	1st leg	2nd leg
Corinthians (Brazil)	3–4	(Argentina) Racing	2–2	1–2
Cruzeiro (Brazil)	2–1	(Argentina) Lanús	1–1	1–0

=== Matches ===
24 October 2024
21:30 UTC−3

Corinthians (Brazil)	2–2	(Argentina) Racing
Yuri Alberto 11', 33'	Report	Salas 6'; Martirena 54'

Neo Química Arena, São Paulo
Attendance: 44,238
Referee: Gustavo Tejera (Uruguay)
31 October 2024
21:30 UTC−3

Racing (Argentina)	2–1	(Brazil) Corinthians
Quintero 36' (pen.), 39'	Report	Yuri Alberto 6'

Estadio Presidente Perón, Avellaneda
Attendance: 38,283
Referee: Felipe González (Chile)

Racing won 4–3 on aggregate and advanced to the final.

23 October 2024
19:00 UTC−3

Cruzeiro (Brazil)	1–1	(Argentina) Lanús
Kaio Jorge 50'	Report	Carrera 73'

Mineirão, Belo Horizonte
Attendance: 57,158
Referee: Andrés Matonte (Uruguay)
30 October 2024
19:00 UTC−3

Lanús (Argentina)	0–1	(Brazil) Cruzeiro
	Report	Kaio Jorge 45+1'

Estadio Ciudad de Lanús, Lanús
Attendance: 29,589
Referee: Juan Benítez (Paraguay)

Cruzeiro won 2–1 on aggregate and advanced to the final.

== Final ==
The final was played on 23 November 2024 at Estadio General Pablo Rojas in Asunción, Paraguay.

23 November 2024
17:00 UTC−3

Racing (Argentina)	3–1	(Brazil) Cruzeiro
Martirena 15'; A. Martínez 20'; R. Martínez 90+5'	Report	Kaio Jorge 52'

Estadio General Pablo Rojas, Asunción
Attendance: 43,828
Referee: Esteban Ostojich (Uruguay)
