= 2024 Copa Sudamericana group stage =

Football tournament

The 2024 Copa Sudamericana group stage was played from 2 April to 8 June 2024. A total of 32 teams competed in the group stage to decide 16 of the 24 places in the final stages of the 2024 Copa Sudamericana.

== Draw ==
The draw for the group stage was held on 18 March 2024, 20:00 PYST (UTC−3), at the CONMEBOL Convention Centre in Luque, Paraguay.

Teams were seeded by their CONMEBOL Clubs ranking as of 18 December 2023 (shown in parentheses), taking into account the following three factors:

1. Performance in the last 10 years, taking into account Copa Libertadores and Copa Sudamericana results in the period 2014–2023.
2. Historical coefficient, taking into account Copa Libertadores and Copa Sudamericana results in the period 1960–2013 and 2002–2013 respectively.
3. Local tournament champion, with bonus points awarded to domestic league champions of the last 10 years.

For the group stage, the 32 teams were drawn into eight groups (Groups A–H) of four containing a team from each of the four pots. The four losers of the Copa Libertadores third stage were seeded into Pot 4. Teams from the same association could not be drawn into the same group.

Group stage draw
Pot 1	Pot 2	Pot 3	Pot 4
(Argentina) Boca Juniors (3); (Brazil) Athletico Paranaense (6); (Brazil) Internacional (11); (Argentina) Racing (20); (Brazil) Corinthians (22); (Argentina) Defensa y Justicia (29); (Brazil) Cruzeiro (33); (Argentina) Lanús (35)	(Brazil) Fortaleza (39); (Argentina) Argentinos Juniors (46); (Colombia) Independiente Medellín (51); (Ecuador) Delfín (78); (Chile) Unión La Calera (80); (Uruguay) Danubio (87); (Venezuela) Metropolitanos (91); (Chile) Coquimbo Unido (95)	(Ecuador) Universidad Católica (99); (Peru) Universidad César Vallejo (118); (Paraguay) Sportivo Luqueño (133); (Brazil) Cuiabá (142); (Bolivia) Nacional Potosí (167); (Argentina) Belgrano (195); (Uruguay) Racing (210); (Paraguay) Sportivo Ameliano (236)	(Bolivia) Real Tomayapo (No rank); (Colombia) Alianza (No rank); (Peru) Deportivo Garcilaso (No rank); (Venezuela) Rayo Zuliano (No rank); (Brazil) Red Bull Bragantino (41); (Paraguay) Nacional (84); (Bolivia) Always Ready (74); (Paraguay) Sportivo Trinidense (No rank)

Notes

1. ^{CLQ3} The Copa Libertadores third stage losers were seeded in Pot 4.

The following were the four losers of the third stage of the 2024 Copa Libertadores qualifying stages which joined the 12 direct entrants and the 16 Copa Sudamericana first stage winners in the group stage.

Match	Third stage losers
G1	(Brazil) Red Bull Bragantino
G2	(Paraguay) Nacional
G3	(Bolivia) Always Ready
G4	(Paraguay) Sportivo Trinidense

== Format ==
In the group stage, each group was played on a home-and-away round-robin basis. The teams were ranked according to the following criteria: 1. Points (3 points for a win, 1 point for a draw, and 0 points for a loss); 2. Goal difference; 3. Goals scored; 4. Away goals scored; 5. CONMEBOL ranking (Regulations Article 2.4.2).

The winners of each group advanced to the round of 16 of the final stages, whilst the runners-up of each group advanced to the knockout round play-offs of the final stages.

== Schedule ==
The schedule of each matchday was as follows (Regulations Article 2.2.2).

Matchday	Dates	Matches
Matchday 1	2–4 April 2024	Team 4 vs. Team 2, Team 3 vs. Team 1
Matchday 2	9–11 April 2024	Team 2 vs. Team 3, Team 1 vs. Team 4
Matchday 3	23–25 April 2024	Team 2 vs. Team 1, Team 4 vs. Team 3
Matchday 4	7–9 May 2024 (Note: One match rescheduled to 4 June 2024.)	Team 3 vs. Team 2, Team 4 vs. Team 1
Matchday 5	14–16 May 2024 (Note: One match rescheduled to 8 June 2024.)	Team 1 vs. Team 2, Team 3 vs. Team 4
Matchday 6	28–30 May 2024	Team 1 vs. Team 3, Team 2 vs. Team 4

== Groups ==
=== Group A ===
Pos	Team	Pld	W	D	L	GF	GA	GD	Pts	Qualification	DIM	CAR	DYJ	UCV
1	(Colombia) Independiente Medellín	6	4	1	1	16	7	+9	13	Advance to round of 16	—	4–0	2–1	4–2
2	(Bolivia) Always Ready	6	3	2	1	10	7	+3	11	Advance to knockout round play-offs	2–0	—	3–0	2–0
3	(Argentina) Defensa y Justicia	6	1	2	3	4	8	−4	5		1–1	1–1	—	0–1
4	(Peru) Universidad César Vallejo	6	1	1	4	6	14	−8	4		1–5	2–2	0–1	—

Source: CONMEBOL
2 April 2024
21:00 UTC−5

Universidad César Vallejo (Peru)	0–1	(Argentina) Defensa y Justicia
	Report	Zapata 59'

Estadio Mansiche, Trujillo
Attendance: 6,119
Referee: Paulo Zanovelli (Brazil)
4 April 2024
22:00 UTC−4

Always Ready (Bolivia)	2–0	(Colombia) Independiente Medellín
Wesley Tanque 45'; Lima 55' (o.g.)	Report

Estadio Municipal de Villa Ingenio, El Alto
Attendance: 2,953
Referee: Flavio de Souza (Brazil)

10 April 2024
19:00 UTC−3

Defensa y Justicia (Argentina)	1–1	(Bolivia) Always Ready
Fernández 30'	Report	Terrazas 73'

Estadio Norberto Tomaghello, Gobernador Costa
Attendance: 5,161
Referee: Francisco Gilabert (Chile)
10 April 2024
21:00 UTC−5

Independiente Medellín (Colombia)	4–2	(Peru) Universidad César Vallejo
Vásquez 12', 23' (pen.); León 48'; García 79'	Report	Mena 63'; Vélez 76' (pen.)

Estadio Atanasio Girardot, Medellín
Attendance: 11,278
Referee: Juan Benítez (Paraguay)

25 April 2024
20:00 UTC−4

Always Ready (Bolivia)	2–0	(Peru) Universidad César Vallejo
Cuéllar 15'; Martínes 90'	Report

Estadio Municipal de Villa Ingenio, El Alto
Attendance: 2,844
Referee: Edina Alves (Brazil)
25 April 2024
21:00 UTC−5

Independiente Medellín (Colombia)	2–1	(Argentina) Defensa y Justicia
León 1'; Monsalve 22'	Report	Palavecino 76'

Estadio Atanasio Girardot, Medellín
Attendance: 9,407
Referee: Wilton Sampaio (Brazil)

7 May 2024
19:00 UTC−5

Universidad César Vallejo (Peru)	1–5	(Colombia) Independiente Medellín
Vélez 21'	Report	León 15', 45'; García 59'; Monsalve 73'; Perlaza 79'

Estadio Mansiche, Trujillo
Attendance: 3,599
Referee: Paulo Zanovelli (Brazil)
7 May 2024
22:00 UTC−4

Always Ready (Bolivia)	3–0	(Argentina) Defensa y Justicia
Rodrígues 11'; Wesley Tanque 47'; Cuéllar 50'	Report

Estadio Municipal de Villa Ingenio, El Alto
Attendance: 810
Referee: Rafael Klein (Brazil)

14 May 2024
21:00 UTC−3

Defensa y Justicia (Argentina)	1–1	(Colombia) Independiente Medellín
Ortíz 68' (o.g.)	Report	León 22'

Estadio Norberto Tomaghello, Gobernador Costa
Attendance: 6,000
Referee: Bráulio Machado (Brazil)
15 May 2024
21:00 UTC−5

Universidad César Vallejo (Peru)	2–2	(Bolivia) Always Ready
Mena 17'; Deneumostier 74'	Report	Caicedo 29'; Wesley Tanque 54'

Estadio Mansiche, Trujillo
Attendance: 2,694
Referee: Raphael Claus (Brazil)

29 May 2024
21:00 UTC−3

Defensa y Justicia (Argentina)	0–1	(Peru) Universidad César Vallejo
	Report	Aguilera 90' (o.g.)

Estadio Norberto Tomaghello, Gobernador Costa
Attendance: 2,463
Referee: Bruno Arleu (Brazil)
29 May 2024
19:00 UTC−5

Independiente Medellín (Colombia)	4–0	(Bolivia) Always Ready
García 47'; Baroja 53' (o.g.); León 55'; Y. Moreno 83'	Report

Estadio Atanasio Girardot, Medellín
Attendance: 21,596
Referee: Gustavo Tejera (Uruguay)

=== Group B ===
Pos	Team	Pld	W	D	L	GF	GA	GD	Pts	Qualification	CRU	UCA	ALI	ULC
1	(Brazil) Cruzeiro	6	3	3	0	8	3	+5	12	Advance to round of 16	—	1–0	3–3	1–0
2	(Ecuador) Universidad Católica	6	3	2	1	8	2	+6	11	Advance to knockout round play-offs	0–0	—	0–0	4–0
3	(Colombia) Alianza	6	1	2	3	5	10	−5	5		0–3	1–3	—	0–1
4	(Chile) Unión La Calera	6	1	1	4	1	7	−6	4		0–0	0–1	0–1	—

Source: CONMEBOL
3 April 2024
21:00 UTC−5

Alianza (Colombia)	0–1	(Chile) Unión La Calera
	Report	Gigliotti 45+3' (pen.)

Estadio Armando Maestre Pavajeau, Valledupar
Referee: Carlos Benítez (Paraguay)
4 April 2024
19:00 UTC−5

Universidad Católica (Ecuador)	0–0	(Brazil) Cruzeiro
	Report

Estadio Olímpico Atahualpa, Quito
Attendance: 3,092
Referee: Ángel Arteaga (Venezuela)

10 April 2024
20:00 UTC−4

Unión La Calera (Chile)	0–1	(Ecuador) Universidad Católica
	Report	I. Díaz 61'

Estadio Elías Figueroa Brander, Valparaíso (Note: Unión La Calera played their home matches at Estadio Elías Figueroa Brander, Valparaíso and Estadio Ester Roa, Concepción (originally scheduled at Estadio Sausalito, Viña del Mar) instead of their regular stadium Estadio Municipal Nicolás Chahuán Nazar, La Calera which did not meet CONMEBOL requirements.)
Attendance: 760
Referee: Darío Herrera (Argentina)
11 April 2024
21:00 UTC−3

Cruzeiro (Brazil)	3–3	(Colombia) Alianza
Romero 7'; Zé Ivaldo 12'; Matheus Pereira 19'	Report	Batalla 53', 79'; Figueroa 90+6'

Mineirão, Belo Horizonte
Attendance: 18,818
Referee: Roberto Pérez (Peru)

23 April 2024
18:00 UTC−4

Unión La Calera (Chile)	0–0	(Brazil) Cruzeiro
	Report

Estadio Ester Roa, Concepción
Attendance: 1,182
Referee: Mario Díaz de Vivar (Paraguay)
23 April 2024
21:00 UTC−5

Alianza (Colombia)	1–3	(Ecuador) Universidad Católica
Batalla 8'	Report	Franco 56' (o.g.); Cifuente 68'; I. Díaz 78'

Estadio Armando Maestre Pavajeau, Valledupar
Referee: Yael Falcón Pérez (Argentina)

7 May 2024
19:30 UTC−5

Alianza (Colombia)	0–3	(Brazil) Cruzeiro
	Report	Lucas Silva 41'; Arthur Gomes 49'; Rafael Elias 90+3'

Estadio Armando Maestre Pavajeau, Valledupar
Attendance: 3,068
Referee: Andrés Merlos (Argentina)
9 May 2024
21:00 UTC−5

Universidad Católica (Ecuador)	4–0	(Chile) Unión La Calera
Fajardo 3', 45+1'; I. Díaz 49'; Cifuente 75'	Report

Estadio Olímpico Atahualpa, Quito
Referee: Facundo Tello (Argentina)

16 May 2024
21:00 UTC−3

Cruzeiro (Brazil)	1–0	(Chile) Unión La Calera
Matheus Pereira 7'	Report

Arena Independência, Belo Horizonte (Note: Cruzeiro played their home match against Unión La Calera at Arena Independência, Belo Horizonte instead of their regular stadium Mineirão, Belo Horizonte due to a concert by Andrea Bocelli scheduled at the latter venue for the following day.)
Attendance: 17,712
Referee: Ivo Méndez (Bolivia)
16 May 2024
21:00 UTC−5

Universidad Católica (Ecuador)	0–0	(Colombia) Alianza
	Report

Estadio Olímpico Atahualpa, Quito
Referee: Fernando Espinoza (Argentina)

30 May 2024
21:00 UTC−3

Cruzeiro (Brazil)	1–0	(Ecuador) Universidad Católica
Rafa Silva 80'	Report

Mineirão, Belo Horizonte
Attendance: 55,254
Referee: Maximiliano Ramírez (Argentina)
30 May 2024
20:00 UTC−4

Unión La Calera (Chile)	0–1	(Colombia) Alianza
	Report	Figueroa 73' (pen.)

Estadio Ester Roa, Concepción
Attendance: 197
Referee: Jordy Alemán (Bolivia)

=== Group C ===
Pos	Team	Pld	W	D	L	GF	GA	GD	Pts	Qualification	BEL	INT	DEL	RTO
1	(Argentina) Belgrano	6	3	3	0	7	3	+4	12	Advance to round of 16	—	0–0	1–1	1–0
2	(Brazil) Internacional	6	3	2	1	6	3	+3	11	Advance to knockout round play-offs	1–2	—	1–0	0–0
3	(Ecuador) Delfín	6	2	2	2	9	8	+1	8		1–1	1–2	—	4–3
4	(Bolivia) Real Tomayapo	6	0	1	5	3	11	−8	1		0–2	0–2	0–2	—

Source: CONMEBOL
2 April 2024
19:00 UTC−3

Belgrano (Argentina)	0–0	(Brazil) Internacional
	Report

Estadio Mario Alberto Kempes, Córdoba (Note: Belgrano played their home matches at Estadio Mario Alberto Kempes, Córdoba instead of their regular stadium Estadio Julio César Villagra, Córdoba which did not meet CONMEBOL requirements.)
Attendance: 32,756
Referee: Kevin Ortega (Peru)
4 April 2024
22:00 UTC−4

Real Tomayapo (Bolivia)	0–2	(Ecuador) Delfín
	Report	Angulo 52' (pen.); Gariglio 74'

Estadio IV Centenario, Tarija
Referee: Mario Díaz de Vivar (Paraguay)

10 April 2024
21:00 UTC−3

Internacional (Brazil)	0–0	(Bolivia) Real Tomayapo
	Report

Estádio Beira-Rio, Porto Alegre
Attendance: 29,643
Referee: Christian Ferreyra (Uruguay)
11 April 2024
21:00 UTC−5

Delfín (Ecuador)	1–1	(Argentina) Belgrano
Elordi 90+1'	Report	Jara 42'

Estadio Jocay, Manta
Attendance: 3,435
Referee: Giancarlo Juliadoza (Paraguay)

24 April 2024
20:30 UTC−4

Real Tomayapo (Bolivia)	0–2	(Argentina) Belgrano
	Report	Lencioni 17'; Marín 83'

Estadio Ramón Tahuichi Aguilera, Santa Cruz de la Sierra (Note: Real Tomayapo played their home match against Belgrano at Estadio Ramón Tahuichi Aguilera, Santa Cruz de la Sierra due to the poor state of the field of their regular stadium Estadio IV Centenario, Tarija.)
Attendance: 4,935
Referee: Juan López (Paraguay)
25 April 2024
21:00 UTC−5

Delfín (Ecuador)	1–2	(Brazil) Internacional
Castro 53'	Report	Wesley 35'; Borré 52' (pen.)

Estadio Jocay, Manta
Attendance: 8,524
Referee: Michael Espinoza (Peru)

9 May 2024
19:00 UTC−3

Belgrano (Argentina)	1–1	(Ecuador) Delfín
Jara 62'	Report	Angulo 64'

Estadio Mario Alberto Kempes, Córdoba
Attendance: 33,200
Referee: Leodán González (Uruguay)

15 May 2024
19:00 UTC−3

Belgrano (Argentina)	1–0	(Bolivia) Real Tomayapo
Velázquez 14'	Report

Estadio Mario Alberto Kempes, Córdoba
Referee: Michael Espinoza (Peru)

28 May 2024
21:30 UTC−3

Internacional (Brazil)	1–2	(Argentina) Belgrano
Borré 39'	Report	Chavarría 45', 45+3'

Arena Barueri, Barueri (Note: Internacional's home matches against Belgrano and Delfín were moved from their regular stadium Estádio Beira-Rio, Porto Alegre to Arena Barueri, Barueri and Estádio Alfredo Jaconi, Caxias do Sul, respectively, due to the impact of the 2024 Rio Grande do Sul floods.)
Attendance: 6,151
Referee: Alexis Herrera (Venezuela)
28 May 2024
19:30 UTC−5

Delfín (Ecuador)	4–3	(Bolivia) Real Tomayapo
Messiniti 4'; Elordi 22'; Miño 75'; Angulo 76'	Report	Graneros 1'; Noble 11'; Rioja 32'

Estadio Jocay, Manta
Attendance: 704
Referee: Edwin Ordóñez (Peru)

4 June 2024 (Note: The Real Tomayapo v Internacional match (originally scheduled for 7 May, 20:00 local time) and the Internacional v Delfín match (originally scheduled for 16 May, 19:00 local time) were postponed to 4 and 8 June, respectively, due to the 2024 Rio Grande do Sul floods.)
20:30 UTC−4

Real Tomayapo (Bolivia)	0–2	(Brazil) Internacional
	Report	Bruno Gomes 31'; Alario 89'

Estadio IV Centenario, Tarija
Attendance: 5,872
Referee: Mathías de Armas (Uruguay)

8 June 2024
21:30 UTC−3

Internacional (Brazil)	1–0	(Ecuador) Delfín
Alario 68'	Report

Estádio Alfredo Jaconi, Caxias do Sul
Attendance: 16,822
Referee: Felipe González (Chile)

=== Group D ===
Pos	Team	Pld	W	D	L	GF	GA	GD	Pts	Qualification	FOR	BOC	NAP	TRI
1	(Brazil) Fortaleza	6	4	1	1	15	8	+7	13	Advance to round of 16	—	4–2	5–0	2–1
2	(Argentina) Boca Juniors	6	3	2	1	10	6	+4	11	Advance to knockout round play-offs	1–1	—	4–0	1–0
3	(Bolivia) Nacional Potosí	6	2	1	3	6	13	−7	7		4–1	0–0	—	2–1
4	(Paraguay) Sportivo Trinidense	6	1	0	5	5	9	−4	3		0–2	1–2	2–0	—

Source: CONMEBOL
3 April 2024
20:00 UTC−4

Sportivo Trinidense (Paraguay)	0–2	(Brazil) Fortaleza
	Report	Thiago Galhardo 4'; Yago Pikachu 90+2'

Estadio Defensores del Chaco, Asunción (Note: Sportivo Trinidense played their home matches at Estadio Defensores del Chaco, Asunción and Estadio General Pablo Rojas, Asunción instead of their regular stadium Estadio Martín Torres, Asunción which did not meet CONMEBOL requirements.)
Attendance: 500
Referee: Francisco Gilabert (Chile)
3 April 2024
20:00 UTC−4

Nacional Potosí (Bolivia)	0–0	(Argentina) Boca Juniors
	Report

Estadio Víctor Agustín Ugarte, Potosí
Attendance: 18,216
Referee: Piero Maza (Chile)

9 April 2024
21:00 UTC−3

Boca Juniors (Argentina)	1–0	(Paraguay) Sportivo Trinidense
Anselmino 71'	Report

La Bombonera, Buenos Aires
Attendance: 42,138
Referee: Gustavo Tejera (Uruguay)
10 April 2024
19:00 UTC−3

Fortaleza (Brazil)	5–0	(Bolivia) Nacional Potosí
Hércules 13'; Lucero 16', 29'; Yago Pikachu 48'; Machuca 58'	Report

Castelão, Fortaleza
Attendance: 19,237
Referee: Augusto Aragón (Ecuador)

23 April 2024
20:00 UTC−4

Sportivo Trinidense (Paraguay)	2–0	(Bolivia) Nacional Potosí
Romero 15'; Salcedo 62'	Report

Estadio Defensores del Chaco, Asunción
Attendance: 393
Referee: Francisco Gilabert (Chile)
25 April 2024
21:00 UTC−3

Fortaleza (Brazil)	4–2	(Argentina) Boca Juniors
Lucero 4', 51'; Yago Pikachu 55', 63'	Report	Merentiel 21'; Zenón 85'

Castelão, Fortaleza
Attendance: 53,428
Referee: Wilmar Roldán (Colombia)

8 May 2024
20:00 UTC−4

Nacional Potosí (Bolivia)	4–1	(Brazil) Fortaleza
Callejo 6'; Prost 37'; Guerra 70'; Álvarez 90+3'	Report	Lucero 16'

Estadio Víctor Agustín Ugarte, Potosí
Attendance: 1,401
Referee: Alex Cajas (Ecuador)
8 May 2024
20:30 UTC−4

Sportivo Trinidense (Paraguay)	1–2	(Argentina) Boca Juniors
Andrada 44'	Report	Figal 69'; Cavani 90+2'

Estadio General Pablo Rojas, Asunción
Attendance: 14,861
Referee: Cristian Garay (Chile)

14 May 2024
22:00 UTC−4

Nacional Potosí (Bolivia)	2–1	(Paraguay) Sportivo Trinidense
Galindo 68'; Álvarez 90+2'	Report	Pereira 29'

Estadio Víctor Agustín Ugarte, Potosí
Attendance: 1,389
Referee: Bryan Loayza (Ecuador)
15 May 2024
21:00 UTC−3

Boca Juniors (Argentina)	1–1	(Brazil) Fortaleza
Cavani 55'	Report	Andrade 90'

La Bombonera, Buenos Aires
Attendance: 46,466
Referee: Jesús Valenzuela (Venezuela)

29 May 2024
21:00 UTC−3

Boca Juniors (Argentina)	4–0	(Bolivia) Nacional Potosí
Zenón 9'; Cavani 14'; Saracchi 19'; Rojo 53'	Report

La Bombonera, Buenos Aires
Attendance: 44,603
Referee: Cristian Garay (Chile)
29 May 2024
21:00 UTC−3

Fortaleza (Brazil)	2–1	(Paraguay) Sportivo Trinidense
Pochettino 20'; Lucero 42'	Report	Rayer 90+3'

Castelão, Fortaleza
Attendance: 29,227
Referee: Augusto Aragón (Ecuador)

=== Group E ===
Pos	Team	Pld	W	D	L	GF	GA	GD	Pts	Qualification	SPA	CAP	DAN	DRZ
1	(Paraguay) Sportivo Ameliano	6	4	1	1	9	5	+4	13	Advance to round of 16	—	1–4	2–1	1–0
2	(Brazil) Athletico Paranaense	6	4	0	2	17	5	+12	12	Advance to knockout round play-offs	0–1	—	1–2	6–0
3	(Uruguay) Danubio	6	2	2	2	5	4	+1	8		0–0	0–1	—	0–0
4	(Venezuela) Rayo Zuliano	6	0	1	5	1	18	−17	1		0–4	1–5	0–2	—

Source: CONMEBOL
2 April 2024
18:00 UTC−4

Sportivo Ameliano (Paraguay)	1–4	(Brazil) Athletico Paranaense
Vera 15'	Report	Mastriani 6', 73'; Zapelli 32'; Fernandinho 45+2'

Estadio General Pablo Rojas, Asunción (Note: Sportivo Ameliano played their home matches at Estadio General Pablo Rojas, Asunción, Estadio La Huerta, Asunción and Estadio Defensores del Chaco, Asunción instead of their regular stadium Estadio José Tomás Silva, Asunción which did not meet CONMEBOL requirements.)
Attendance: 9,790
Referee: Andrés Merlos (Argentina)
3 April 2024
18:00 UTC−4

Rayo Zuliano (Venezuela)	0–2	(Uruguay) Danubio
	Report	Bueno 78'; Fernández 90+3'

Estadio Brígido Iriarte, Caracas (Note: Rayo Zuliano played their home matches at Estadio Brígido Iriarte, Caracas instead of their regular stadium Estadio José Pachencho Romero, Maracaibo which did not meet CONMEBOL requirements.)
Attendance: 3,375
Referee: Carlos Betancur (Colombia)

9 April 2024
21:30 UTC−3

Danubio (Uruguay)	0–0	(Paraguay) Sportivo Ameliano
	Report

Estadio Centenario, Montevideo (Note: Danubio played their home matches at Estadio Centenario, Montevideo instead of their regular stadium Estadio Jardines del Hipódromo, Montevideo which did not meet CONMEBOL requirements.)
Attendance: 1,432
Referee: José Cabero (Chile)
9 April 2024
21:30 UTC−3

Athletico Paranaense (Brazil)	6–0	(Venezuela) Rayo Zuliano
Fernandinho 15' (pen.); Esquivel 23'; Canobbio 27', 76'; Pablo 45+1'; Mastriani 66'	Report

Arena da Baixada, Curitiba
Attendance: 22,317
Referee: Ivo Méndez (Bolivia)

24 April 2024
19:00 UTC−3

Danubio (Uruguay)	0–1	(Brazil) Athletico Paranaense
	Report	Madson 16'

Estadio Centenario, Montevideo
Attendance: 1,178
Referee: Kevin Ortega (Peru)
24 April 2024
22:00 UTC−4

Rayo Zuliano (Venezuela)	0–4	(Paraguay) Sportivo Ameliano
	Report	Valdez 35', 56'; Contrera 45+2' (pen.); Martinich 60'

Estadio Brígido Iriarte, Caracas
Attendance: 299
Referee: Leandro Rey Hilfer (Argentina)

7 May 2024
20:30 UTC−4

Sportivo Ameliano (Paraguay)	2–1	(Uruguay) Danubio
Valdez 35'; González 41'	Report	Ancheta 8'

Estadio La Huerta, Asunción
Attendance: 962
Referee: José Cabero (Chile)
8 May 2024
18:00 UTC−4

Rayo Zuliano (Venezuela)	1–5	(Brazil) Athletico Paranaense
Ochoa 63'	Report	Esquivel 22'; Mastriani 33', 37'; Di Yorio 75' (pen.); Felipinho 81'

Estadio Brígido Iriarte, Caracas
Attendance: 784
Referee: Bryan Loayza (Ecuador)

14 May 2024
20:00 UTC−4

Sportivo Ameliano (Paraguay)	1–0	(Venezuela) Rayo Zuliano
Valdez 38'	Report

Estadio Defensores del Chaco, Asunción
Attendance: 1,741
Referee: Joel Alarcón (Peru)
15 May 2024
19:00 UTC−3

Athletico Paranaense (Brazil)	1–2	(Uruguay) Danubio
Di Yorio 90+4'	Report	Pintos 29'; Fernández 42'

Arena da Baixada, Curitiba
Attendance: 22,926
Referee: Carlos Ortega (Colombia)

30 May 2024
21:00 UTC−3

Athletico Paranaense (Brazil)	0–1	(Paraguay) Sportivo Ameliano
	Report	R. Torales 61'

Arena da Baixada, Curitiba
Attendance: 26,026
Referee: Leandro Rey Hilfer (Argentina)
30 May 2024
21:00 UTC−3

Danubio (Uruguay)	0–0	(Venezuela) Rayo Zuliano
	Report

Estadio Centenario, Montevideo
Attendance: 1,174
Referee: Manuel Vergara (Chile)

=== Group F ===
Pos	Team	Pld	W	D	L	GF	GA	GD	Pts	Qualification	COR	RCM	ARG	NAC
1	(Brazil) Corinthians	6	4	1	1	14	2	+12	13	Advance to round of 16	—	3–0	4–0	4–0
2	(Uruguay) Racing	6	3	2	1	10	8	+2	11	Advance to knockout round play-offs	1–1	—	2–1	2–1
3	(Argentina) Argentinos Juniors	6	3	0	3	7	12	−5	9		1–0	0–3	—	2–1
4	(Paraguay) Nacional	6	0	1	5	6	15	−9	1		0–2	2–2	2–3	—

Source: CONMEBOL
2 April 2024
18:00 UTC−4

Nacional (Paraguay)	2–3	(Argentina) Argentinos Juniors
Rivas 77'; Arévalo 89'	Report	Romero 29', 45+2'; Lescano 41'

Estadio Defensores del Chaco, Asunción (Note: Nacional played their home matches at Estadio Defensores del Chaco, Asunción instead of their regular stadium Estadio Arsenio Erico, Asunción which did not meet CONMEBOL requirements.)
Attendance: 899
Referee: Felipe González (Chile)
2 April 2024
21:30 UTC−3

Racing (Uruguay)	1–1	(Brazil) Corinthians
Alaniz 85'	Report	Yuri Alberto 69'

Estadio Centenario, Montevideo (Note: Racing (URU) played their home matches at Estadio Centenario, Montevideo instead of their regular stadium Estadio Osvaldo Roberto, Montevideo which did not meet CONMEBOL requirements.)
Attendance: 1,685
Referee: Jhon Hinestroza (Colombia)

9 April 2024
19:00 UTC−3

Argentinos Juniors (Argentina)	0–3	(Uruguay) Racing
	Report	Verón Lupi 41', 48'; Urretaviscaya 53'

Estadio Diego Armando Maradona, Buenos Aires
Attendance: 2,962
Referee: Yender Herrera (Venezuela)
9 April 2024
19:00 UTC−3

Corinthians (Brazil)	4–0	(Paraguay) Nacional
Romero 22', 73'; Yuri Alberto 64'; Pedro Raul 89'	Report

Neo Química Arena, São Paulo
Attendance: 32,351
Referee: Jhon Ospina (Colombia)

23 April 2024
21:30 UTC−3

Argentinos Juniors (Argentina)	1–0	(Brazil) Corinthians
Verón 2'	Report

Estadio Diego Armando Maradona, Buenos Aires
Referee: Piero Maza (Chile)
25 April 2024
18:00 UTC−4

Nacional (Paraguay)	2–2	(Uruguay) Racing
G. Caballero 36'; Santacruz 69'	Report	Verón Lupi 39'; Rivero 78'

Estadio Defensores del Chaco, Asunción
Attendance: 382
Referee: Felipe González (Chile)

7 May 2024
19:00 UTC−3

Racing (Uruguay)	2–1	(Argentina) Argentinos Juniors
Verón Lupi 20'; De los Santos 27'	Report	Gondou 32'

Estadio Centenario, Montevideo
Attendance: 1,431
Referee: Carlos Betancur (Colombia)
7 May 2024
18:00 UTC−4

Nacional (Paraguay)	0–2	(Brazil) Corinthians
	Report	Yuri Alberto 75'; Matheuzinho 90+6'

Estadio Defensores del Chaco, Asunción
Attendance: 2,058
Referee: Ángel Arteaga (Venezuela)

14 May 2024
19:00 UTC−3

Racing (Uruguay)	2–1	(Paraguay) Nacional
Nandín 54'; Bueno 64'	Report	Bailone 53' (pen.)

Estadio Centenario, Montevideo
Attendance: 762
Referee: Gery Vargas (Bolivia)
14 May 2024
21:30 UTC−3

Corinthians (Brazil)	4–0	(Argentina) Argentinos Juniors
Yuri Alberto 9', 43'; Wesley 41'; Vera 90+2'	Report

Neo Química Arena, São Paulo
Attendance: 40,049
Referee: Felipe González (Chile)

28 May 2024
19:00 UTC−3

Corinthians (Brazil)	3–0	(Uruguay) Racing
Garro 22'; Ferreira 25' (o.g.); Coronado 58'	Report

Neo Química Arena, São Paulo
Attendance: 40,353
Referee: Roberto Pérez (Peru)
28 May 2024
19:00 UTC−3

Argentinos Juniors (Argentina)	2–1	(Paraguay) Nacional
Heredia 7'; Batallini 18' (pen.)	Report	Arévalo 39'

Estadio Diego Armando Maradona, Buenos Aires
Attendance: 5,000
Referee: José Cabero (Chile)

=== Group G ===
Pos	Team	Pld	W	D	L	GF	GA	GD	Pts	Qualification	LAN	CUI	GAR	MET
1	(Argentina) Lanús	6	4	1	1	12	3	+9	13	Advance to round of 16	—	0–1	2–1	5–0
2	(Brazil) Cuiabá	6	3	3	0	9	3	+6	12	Advance to knockout round play-offs	1–1	—	1–1	3–0
3	(Peru) Deportivo Garcilaso	6	1	3	2	7	9	−2	6		0–2	1–1	—	3–2
4	(Venezuela) Metropolitanos	6	0	1	5	3	16	−13	1		0–2	0–2	1–1	—

Source: CONMEBOL
3 April 2024
18:00 UTC−4

Cuiabá (Brazil)	1–1	(Argentina) Lanús
Fernando Sobral 57'	Report	Lotti 80'

Arena Pantanal, Cuiabá
Attendance: 5,250
Referee: Gery Vargas (Bolivia)
4 April 2024
17:00 UTC−5

Deportivo Garcilaso (Peru)	3–2	(Venezuela) Metropolitanos
Gentile 30'; Erustes 63' (pen.); Gordillo 90+3'	Report	Ortiz 25', 37'

Estadio Garcilaso, Cusco
Attendance: 3,420
Referee: Guillermo Guerrero (Ecuador)

11 April 2024
18:00 UTC−4

Metropolitanos (Venezuela)	0–2	(Brazil) Cuiabá
	Report	Deyverson 4', 43' (pen.)

Estadio Olímpico de la UCV, Caracas
Attendance: 740
Referee: Alex Cajas (Ecuador)
11 April 2024
19:00 UTC−3

Lanús (Argentina)	2–1	(Peru) Deportivo Garcilaso
Peña Biafore 26'; Bou 63'	Report	Erustes 45+4'

Estadio Ciudad de Lanús, Lanús
Referee: José Méndez (Paraguay)

23 April 2024
19:00 UTC−5

Deportivo Garcilaso (Peru)	1–1	(Brazil) Cuiabá
Beltrán 76'	Report	Pitta 73'

Estadio Garcilaso, Cusco
Attendance: 6,043
Referee: Augusto Aragón (Ecuador)
25 April 2024
18:00 UTC−4

Metropolitanos (Venezuela)	0–2	(Argentina) Lanús
	Report	Bou 29', 34'

Estadio Olímpico de la UCV, Caracas
Attendance: 1,523
Referee: Jhon Ospina (Colombia)

8 May 2024
20:00 UTC−4

Cuiabá (Brazil)	3–0	(Venezuela) Metropolitanos
Fernando Sobral 39'; Pitta 69', 83'	Report

Arena Pantanal, Cuiabá
Attendance: 3,145
Referee: Derlis López (Paraguay)
9 May 2024
21:00 UTC−5

Deportivo Garcilaso (Peru)	0–2	(Argentina) Lanús
	Report	Bou 7'; Moreno 54'

Estadio Garcilaso, Cusco
Attendance: 5,292
Referee: Gery Vargas (Bolivia)

15 May 2024
19:00 UTC−3

Lanús (Argentina)	5–0	(Venezuela) Metropolitanos
Cuero 5' (o.g.); Bou 23', 55'; Álvarez 52'; Watson 76'	Report

Estadio Ciudad de Lanús, Lanús
Attendance: 3,711
Referee: Jhon Hinestroza (Colombia)
15 May 2024
20:00 UTC−4

Cuiabá (Brazil)	1–1	(Peru) Deportivo Garcilaso
Fernando Sobral 72'	Report	Erustes 39'

Arena Pantanal, Cuiabá
Attendance: 2,273
Referee: Juan Lara (Chile)

29 May 2024
19:00 UTC−3

Lanús (Argentina)	0–1	(Brazil) Cuiabá
	Report	Pitta 51'

Estadio Ciudad de Lanús, Lanús
Attendance: 2,905
Referee: Gery Vargas (Bolivia)
29 May 2024
18:00 UTC−4

Metropolitanos (Venezuela)	1–1	(Peru) Deportivo Garcilaso
Flores 44'	Report	Erustes 37'

Estadio Olímpico de la UCV, Caracas
Attendance: 1,100
Referee: Alberto Feres (Uruguay)

=== Group H ===
Pos	Team	Pld	W	D	L	GF	GA	GD	Pts	Qualification	RAC	RBB	COQ	SLU
1	(Argentina) Racing	6	5	0	1	14	3	+11	15	Advance to round of 16	—	3–0	3–0	3–0
2	(Brazil) Red Bull Bragantino	6	4	1	1	9	8	+1	13	Advance to knockout round play-offs	2–1	—	1–0	2–1
3	(Chile) Coquimbo Unido	6	1	2	3	3	7	−4	5		1–2	1–1	—	1–0
4	(Paraguay) Sportivo Luqueño	6	0	1	5	3	11	−8	1		0–2	2–3	0–0	—

Source: CONMEBOL
3 April 2024
21:00 UTC−3

Red Bull Bragantino (Brazil)	1–0	(Chile) Coquimbo Unido
Vitinho 45+4'	Report

Estádio Nabi Abi Chedid, Bragança Paulista
Attendance: 3,685
Referee: Ivo Méndez (Bolivia)
4 April 2024
20:00 UTC−4

Sportivo Luqueño (Paraguay)	0–2	(Argentina) Racing
	Report	A. Martínez 41'; R. Martínez 45'

Estadio Defensores del Chaco, Asunción (Note: Sportivo Luqueño played their home matches at Estadio Defensores del Chaco, Asunción instead of their regular stadium Estadio Feliciano Cáceres, Luque.)
Referee: Gustavo Tejera (Uruguay)

10 April 2024
21:30 UTC−3

Racing (Argentina)	3–0	(Brazil) Red Bull Bragantino
Salas 2'; A. Martínez 20'; R. Martínez 90+2'	Report

Estadio Presidente Perón, Avellaneda
Attendance: 19,826
Referee: Alexis Herrera (Venezuela)
11 April 2024
20:00 UTC−4

Coquimbo Unido (Chile)	1–0	(Paraguay) Sportivo Luqueño
Chávez 15'	Report

Estadio Municipal Francisco Sánchez Rumoroso, Coquimbo
Attendance: 7,088
Referee: Gery Vargas (Bolivia)

24 April 2024
18:00 UTC−4

Coquimbo Unido (Chile)	1–2	(Argentina) Racing
Arias 43' (o.g.)	Report	Solari 10'; A. Martínez 45+5' (pen.)

Estadio Municipal Francisco Sánchez Rumoroso, Coquimbo
Attendance: 9,954
Referee: Carlos Betancur (Colombia)
24 April 2024
21:00 UTC−3

Red Bull Bragantino (Brazil)	2–1	(Paraguay) Sportivo Luqueño
Borbas 28'; Gustavinho 47'	Report	Ferreira 76'

Estádio Nabi Abi Chedid, Bragança Paulista
Attendance: 3,654
Referee: Bryan Loayza (Ecuador)

8 May 2024
18:00 UTC−4

Sportivo Luqueño (Paraguay)	0–0	(Chile) Coquimbo Unido
	Report

Estadio Defensores del Chaco, Asunción
Attendance: 1,279
Referee: Yender Herrera (Venezuela)
9 May 2024
21:00 UTC−3

Red Bull Bragantino (Brazil)	2–1	(Argentina) Racing
Borbas 5', 7'	Report	Solari 25'

Estádio Nabi Abi Chedid, Bragança Paulista
Attendance: 4,850
Referee: Kevin Ortega (Peru)

16 May 2024
19:00 UTC−3

Racing (Argentina)	3–0	(Chile) Coquimbo Unido
A. Martínez 55' (pen.), 71'; Nardoni 61'	Report

Estadio Presidente Perón, Avellaneda
Attendance: 17,016
Referee: Andrés Rojas (Colombia)
16 May 2024
20:00 UTC−4

Sportivo Luqueño (Paraguay)	2–3	(Brazil) Red Bull Bragantino
Ferreira 3'; Leguizamón 37'	Report	Helinho 15', 80'; Lincoln 74'

Estadio Defensores del Chaco, Asunción
Attendance: 448
Referee: Augusto Aragón (Ecuador)

28 May 2024
21:30 UTC−3

Racing (Argentina)	3–0	(Paraguay) Sportivo Luqueño
A. Martínez 10'; Salas 35'; R. Martínez 81' (pen.)	Report

Estadio Ciudad de Lanús, Lanús (Note: Racing (ARG) played their home match against Sportivo Luqueño at Estadio Ciudad de Lanús, Lanús instead of their regular stadium Estadio Presidente Perón, Avellaneda.)
Attendance: 14,139
Referee: Bismark Santiago (Colombia)
28 May 2024
20:30 UTC−4

Coquimbo Unido (Chile)	1–1	(Brazil) Red Bull Bragantino
Chávez 41'	Report	Helinho 90+8' (pen.)

Estadio Municipal Francisco Sánchez Rumoroso, Coquimbo
Referee: Alex Cajas (Ecuador)
