= 2024 Copa Libertadores qualifying stages =

Football results

The 2024 Copa Libertadores qualifying stages were played from 6 February to 14 March 2024. A total of 19 teams competed in the qualifying stages to decide four of the 32 places in the group stage of the 2024 Copa Libertadores.

== Draw ==
The draw for the qualifying stages was held on 19 December 2023, 12:00 PYST (UTC−3), at the CONMEBOL Convention Centre in Luque, Paraguay.

Teams were seeded by their CONMEBOL Clubs ranking as of 18 December 2023 (shown in parentheses), taking into account the following three factors:

1. Performance in the last 10 years, taking into account Copa Libertadores and Copa Sudamericana results in the period 2014–2023.
2. Historical coefficient, taking into account Copa Libertadores and Copa Sudamericana results in the period 1960–2013 and 2002–2013 respectively.
3. Local tournament champion, with bonus points awarded to domestic league champions of the last 10 years.

For the first stage, the six teams were drawn into three ties (E1–E3), with the teams from Pot 1 hosting the second leg.

First stage draw
Pot 1	Pot 2
(Peru) Melgar (44); (Uruguay) Defensor Sporting (66); (Paraguay) Nacional (84)	(Ecuador) Aucas (88); (Venezuela) Academia Puerto Cabello (162); (Bolivia) Aurora (243)

1. ^{†} The identity of the team Bolivia 4 was not known at the time the pots were announced and it was seeded in Pot 2.

For the second stage, the 16 teams were drawn into eight ties (C1–C8), with the teams from Pot 1 hosting the second leg. Teams from the same association could not be drawn into the same tie, excluding the three winners of the first stage, which were seeded in Pot 2 and whose identity was not known at the time of the draw, and could be drawn into the same tie with another team from the same association.

Second stage draw
Pot 1	Pot 2
(Uruguay) Nacional (5); (Colombia) Atlético Nacional (21); (Chile) Colo-Colo (26); (Peru) Sporting Cristal (34); (Brazil) Red Bull Bragantino (41); (Brazil) Botafogo (49); (Chile) Palestino (62); (Ecuador) El Nacional (68)	(Argentina) Godoy Cruz (72); (Bolivia) Always Ready (74); (Venezuela) Portuguesa (119); (Colombia) Águilas Doradas (187); (Paraguay) Sportivo Trinidense (No rank); First stage winner E1; First stage winner E2; First stage winner E3

For the third stage, the eight winners of the second stage were allocated without any draw into the following four ties (G1–G4), with the team in each tie with the higher CONMEBOL ranking hosting the second leg.

- Second stage winner C1 vs. Second stage winner C8
- Second stage winner C2 vs. Second stage winner C7
- Second stage winner C3 vs. Second stage winner C6
- Second stage winner C4 vs. Second stage winner C5

== Format ==
In the qualifying stages, each tie was played on a home-and-away two-legged basis. If tied on aggregate, extra time would not be played, and a penalty shoot-out would be used to determine the winner (Regulations Article 2.4.3).

== Bracket ==
The qualifying stages were structured as follows:

- First stage (6 teams): The three winners of the first stage advanced to the second stage to join the 13 teams which were given byes to the second stage.
- Second stage (16 teams): The eight winners of the second stage advanced to the third stage.
- Third stage (8 teams): The four winners of the third stage advanced to the group stage to join the 28 direct entrants. The four teams eliminated in the third stage entered the Copa Sudamericana group stage.

The bracket was decided based on the first stage draw and second stage draw, which was held on 19 December 2023.

=== Winner G1 ===
First stage
(Bolivia) Aurora	1	1	2
(Peru) Melgar	0	1	1
(Brazil) Botafogo	Bye
(Colombia) Águilas Doradas	Bye
(Brazil) Red Bull Bragantino	Bye

Second stage
(Bolivia) Aurora	1	0	1
(Brazil) Botafogo	1	6	7
(Colombia) Águilas Doradas	0	0	0 (3)
(Brazil) Red Bull Bragantino (p)	0	0	0 (4)

Third stage
(Brazil) Botafogo	2	1	3
(Brazil) Red Bull Bragantino	1	1	2

=== Winner G2 ===
First stage
(Ecuador) Aucas	1	0	1
(Paraguay) Nacional	0	3	3
(Colombia) Atlético Nacional	Bye
(Venezuela) Portuguesa	Bye
(Chile) Palestino	Bye

Second stage
(Paraguay) Nacional	1	3	4
(Colombia) Atlético Nacional	0	0	0
(Venezuela) Portuguesa	1	1	2
(Chile) Palestino	2	2	4

Third stage
(Paraguay) Nacional	0	3	3 (1)
(Chile) Palestino (p)	2	1	3 (3)

=== Winner G3 ===
First stage
(Bolivia) Always Ready	Bye
(Peru) Sporting Cristal	Bye
(Venezuela) Academia Puerto Cabello (p)	3	0	3 (4)
(Uruguay) Defensor Sporting	2	1	3 (2)
(Uruguay) Nacional	Bye

Second stage
(Bolivia) Always Ready	6	1	7
(Peru) Sporting Cristal	1	3	4
(Venezuela) Academia Puerto Cabello	0	0	0
(Uruguay) Nacional	2	2	4

Third stage
(Bolivia) Always Ready	1	1	2 (4)
(Uruguay) Nacional (p)	0	2	2 (5)

=== Winner G4 ===
First stage
(Paraguay) Sportivo Trinidense	Bye
(Ecuador) El Nacional	Bye
(Argentina) Godoy Cruz	Bye
(Chile) Colo-Colo	Bye

Second stage
(Paraguay) Sportivo Trinidense	1	1	2
(Ecuador) El Nacional	1	0	1
(Argentina) Godoy Cruz	0	0	0
(Chile) Colo-Colo	1	0	1

Third stage
(Paraguay) Sportivo Trinidense	1	1	2
(Chile) Colo-Colo	1	2	3

== First stage ==
=== Summary ===
The first legs were played on 6–8 February, and the second legs were played on 13–15 February 2024.

Team 1	Agg.	Team 2	1st leg	2nd leg
Academia Puerto Cabello (Venezuela)	3–3 (4–2 p)	(Uruguay) Defensor Sporting	3–2	0–1
Aurora (Bolivia)	2–1	(Peru) Melgar	1–0	1–1
Aucas (Ecuador)	1–3	(Paraguay) Nacional	1–0	0–3

=== Matches ===
6 February 2024
20:30 UTC−4

Academia Puerto Cabello (Venezuela)	3–2	(Uruguay) Defensor Sporting
A. Romero 1'; Fedor 36'; Covea 88'	Report	Bernal 24'; Rivero 67' (pen.)

Estadio Misael Delgado, Valencia (Note: Academia Puerto Cabello played their home matches at Estadio Misael Delgado, Valencia instead of their regular stadium Estadio La Bombonerita, Puerto Cabello which did not meet CONMEBOL requirements.)
Referee: Carlos Ortega (Colombia)
13 February 2024
21:30 UTC−3

Defensor Sporting (Uruguay)	1–0	(Venezuela) Academia Puerto Cabello
Mansilla 45+3'	Report
Penalties
Rivero (penalty scored); Elizari (penalty missed); De los Santos (penalty missed); Rodríguez (penalty scored)	2–4	(penalty scored) Bravo; (penalty missed) Covea; (penalty scored) Moreno; (penalty scored) Okitokandjo; (penalty scored) Cermeño

Estadio Centenario, Montevideo (Note: Defensor Sporting played their home match at Estadio Centenario, Montevideo instead of their regular stadium Estadio Luis Franzini, Montevideo which did not meet CONMEBOL requirements.)
Attendance: 1,857
Referee: Carlos Benítez (Paraguay)

Tied 3–3 on aggregate, Academia Puerto Cabello won on penalties and advanced to the second stage (Match C6).

7 February 2024
20:30 UTC−4

Aurora (Bolivia)	1–0	(Peru) Melgar
Alaniz 45+1'	Report

Estadio Félix Capriles, Cochabamba
Attendance: 7,978
Referee: Paulo Zanovelli (Brazil)
14 February 2024
19:30 UTC−5

Melgar (Peru)	1–1	(Bolivia) Aurora
Bordacahar 7'	Report	Blanco 2'

Estadio Monumental de la UNSA, Arequipa
Attendance: 9,018
Referee: Andrés Matonte (Uruguay)

Aurora won 2–1 on aggregate and advanced to the second stage (Match C8).

8 February 2024
19:30 UTC−5

Aucas (Ecuador)	1–0	(Paraguay) Nacional
Medina 85' (pen.)	Report

Estadio Gonzalo Pozo Ripalda, Quito
Attendance: 5,152
Referee: Piero Maza (Chile)
15 February 2024
21:30 UTC−3

Nacional (Paraguay)	3–0	(Ecuador) Aucas
D. Duarte 12', 31'; Arévalo 55'	Report

Estadio Defensores del Chaco, Asunción (Note: Nacional played their home matches at Estadio Defensores del Chaco, Asunción instead of their regular stadium Estadio Arsenio Erico, Asunción which did not meet CONMEBOL requirements.)
Referee: Anderson Daronco (Brazil)

Nacional won 3–1 on aggregate and advanced to the second stage (Match C2).

== Second stage ==
=== Summary ===
The first legs were played on 20–22 February, and the second legs were played on 27–29 February 2024.

Team 1	Agg.	Team 2	1st leg	2nd leg
Águilas Doradas (Colombia)	0–0 (3–4 p)	(Brazil) Red Bull Bragantino	0–0	0–0
Nacional (Paraguay)	4–0	(Colombia) Atlético Nacional	1–0	3–0
Always Ready (Bolivia)	7–4	(Peru) Sporting Cristal	6–1	1–3
Godoy Cruz (Argentina)	0–1	(Chile) Colo-Colo	0–1	0–0
Sportivo Trinidense (Paraguay)	2–1	(Ecuador) El Nacional	1–1	1–0
Academia Puerto Cabello (Venezuela)	0–4	(Uruguay) Nacional	0–2	0–2
Portuguesa (Venezuela)	2–4	(Chile) Palestino	1–2	1–2
Aurora (Bolivia)	1–7	(Brazil) Botafogo	1–1	0–6

=== Matches ===
20 February 2024
19:30 UTC−5

Águilas Doradas (Colombia)	0–0	(Brazil) Red Bull Bragantino
	Report

Estadio Atanasio Girardot, Medellín (Note: Águilas Doradas played their home match at Estadio Atanasio Girardot, Medellín (originally scheduled at Estadio El Campín, Bogotá) instead of their regular stadium Estadio Alberto Grisales, Rionegro which did not meet CONMEBOL requirements.)
Referee: Gustavo Tejera (Uruguay)
27 February 2024
21:30 UTC−3

Red Bull Bragantino (Brazil)	0–0	(Colombia) Águilas Doradas
	Report
Penalties
Lincoln (penalty scored); Nathan (penalty scored); Luan Cândido (penalty scored); Léo Ortiz (penalty scored)	4–3	(penalty missed) Salazar; (penalty scored) Pineda; (penalty scored) Garavito; (penalty scored) Quiñónes; (penalty missed) Góez

Estádio Nabi Abi Chedid, Bragança Paulista
Attendance: 4,115
Referee: Piero Maza (Chile)

Tied 0–0 on aggregate, Red Bull Bragantino won on penalties and advanced to the third stage (Match G1).

21 February 2024
21:30 UTC−3

Nacional (Paraguay)	1–0	(Colombia) Atlético Nacional
D. Duarte 49'	Report

Estadio Defensores del Chaco, Asunción
Attendance: 2,674
Referee: Darío Herrera (Argentina)
28 February 2024
19:30 UTC−5

Atlético Nacional (Colombia)	0–3	(Paraguay) Nacional
	Report	Alfaro 24'; Arévalo 72'; Velazco 90+2' (pen.)

Estadio Atanasio Girardot, Medellín
Attendance: 17,292
Referee: Wilton Sampaio (Brazil)

Nacional won 4–0 on aggregate and advanced to the third stage (Match G2).

20 February 2024
20:30 UTC−4

Always Ready (Bolivia)	6–1	(Peru) Sporting Cristal
Wesley Tanque 14'; Romero 48', 78' (pen.); Robson Matheus 54'; Cuéllar 59'; Paniagua 89'	Report	Cauteruccio 44' (pen.)

Estadio Municipal de Villa Ingenio, El Alto
Attendance: 19,070
Referee: Alexis Herrera (Venezuela)
27 February 2024
19:30 UTC−5

Sporting Cristal (Peru)	3–1	(Bolivia) Always Ready
Cauteruccio 36', 46', 78'	Report	Terrazas 16'

Estadio Nacional, Lima (Note: Sporting Cristal played their home match at Estadio Nacional, Lima instead of their regular stadium Estadio Alberto Gallardo, Lima which did not meet CONMEBOL requirements.)
Attendance: 32,767
Referee: Gustavo Tejera (Uruguay)

Always Ready won 7–4 on aggregate and advanced to the third stage (Match G3).

22 February 2024
21:30 UTC−3

Godoy Cruz (Argentina)	0–1	(Chile) Colo-Colo
	Report	Bolados 59'

Estadio Malvinas Argentinas, Mendoza
Attendance: 23,000
Referee: Flavio de Souza (Brazil)
29 February 2024
21:30 UTC−3

Colo-Colo (Chile)	0–0	(Argentina) Godoy Cruz
	Report

Estadio Monumental David Arellano, Santiago
Attendance: 29,411
Referee: Andrés Matonte (Uruguay)

Colo-Colo won 1–0 on aggregate and advanced to the third stage (Match G4).

22 February 2024
19:00 UTC−3

Sportivo Trinidense (Paraguay)	1–1	(Ecuador) El Nacional
Romero 35'	Report	Minda 74'

Estadio Defensores del Chaco, Asunción (Note: Sportivo Trinidense played their home matches at Estadio Defensores del Chaco, Asunción and Estadio La Huerta, Asunción instead of their regular stadium Estadio Martín Torres, Asunción which did not meet CONMEBOL requirements.)
Attendance: 2,048
Referee: Roberto Pérez (Peru)
29 February 2024
17:00 UTC−5

El Nacional (Ecuador)	0–1	(Paraguay) Sportivo Trinidense
	Report	Rayer 84'

Estadio Rodrigo Paz Delgado, Quito (Note: El Nacional played their home match at Estadio Rodrigo Paz Delgado instead of their regular stadium Estadio Olímpico Atahualpa, Quito.)
Attendance: 10,296
Referee: Jhon Ospina (Colombia)

Sportivo Trinidense won 2–1 on aggregate and advanced to the third stage (Match G4).

21 February 2024
18:00 UTC−4

Academia Puerto Cabello (Venezuela)	0–2	(Uruguay) Nacional
	Report	Sanabria 11'; Ebere 42' (pen.)

Estadio Misael Delgado, Valencia
Attendance: 7,051
Referee: Bráulio Machado (Brazil)
28 February 2024
19:00 UTC−3

Nacional (Uruguay)	2–0	(Venezuela) Academia Puerto Cabello
Bentancourt 59'; Carneiro 89'	Report

Estadio Gran Parque Central, Montevideo
Attendance: 26,786
Referee: Yael Falcón Pérez (Argentina)

Nacional won 4–0 on aggregate and advanced to the third stage (Match G3).

20 February 2024
18:00 UTC−4

Portuguesa (Venezuela)	1–2	(Chile) Palestino
Rodríguez 9'	Report	Carrasco 15' (pen.); Sosa 31'

Estadio Brígido Iriarte, Caracas (Note: Portuguesa played their home match at Estadio Brígido Iriarte, Caracas (originally scheduled at Estadio Metropolitano, Cabudare) instead of their regular stadium Estadio General José Antonio Paez, Acarigua which did not meet CONMEBOL requirements.)
Attendance: 4,662
Referee: Augusto Aragón (Ecuador)
27 February 2024
19:00 UTC−3

Palestino (Chile)	2–1	(Venezuela) Portuguesa
Marabel 8'; Román 69'	Report	Meza 80'

Estadio El Teniente, Rancagua (Note: Palestino played their home matches at Estadio El Teniente, Rancagua instead of their regular stadium Estadio Municipal de La Cisterna, Santiago which did not meet CONMEBOL requirements.)
Attendance: 1,794
Referee: Mario Díaz de Vivar (Paraguay)

Palestino won 4–2 on aggregate and advanced to the third stage (Match G2).

21 February 2024
20:30 UTC−4

Aurora (Bolivia)	1–1	(Brazil) Botafogo
Da. Torrico 90+6'	Report	Júnior Santos 27'

Estadio Félix Capriles, Cochabamba
Referee: Cristian Garay (Chile)
28 February 2024
21:30 UTC−3

Botafogo (Brazil)	6–0	(Bolivia) Aurora
Júnior Santos 3', 52', 69', 81'; Tiquinho Soares 15'; Savarino 45+2'	Report

Estádio Olímpico Nilton Santos, Rio de Janeiro
Attendance: 21,917
Referee: Jesús Valenzuela (Venezuela)

Botafogo won 7–1 on aggregate and advanced to the third stage (Match G1).

== Third stage ==
=== Summary ===
The first legs were played on 5–7 March, and the second legs were played on 12–14 March 2024.

Team 1	Agg.	Team 2	1st leg	2nd leg
Botafogo (Brazil)	3–2	(Brazil) Red Bull Bragantino	2–1	1–1
Nacional (Paraguay)	3–3 (1–3 p)	(Chile) Palestino	0–2	3–1
Always Ready (Bolivia)	2–2 (4–5 p)	(Uruguay) Nacional	1–0	1–2
Sportivo Trinidense (Paraguay)	2–3	(Chile) Colo-Colo	1–1	1–2

=== Matches ===
6 March 2024
21:30 UTC−3

Botafogo (Brazil)	2–1	(Brazil) Red Bull Bragantino
Júnior Santos 44', 73'	Report	Juninho Capixaba 45+2'

Estádio Olímpico Nilton Santos, Rio de Janeiro
Attendance: 33,433
Referee: Gustavo Tejera (Uruguay)
13 March 2024
21:30 UTC−3

Red Bull Bragantino (Brazil)	1–1	(Brazil) Botafogo
Talisson 86'	Report	Júnior Santos 76'

Estádio Nabi Abi Chedid, Bragança Paulista
Attendance: 8,300
Referee: Wilmar Roldán (Colombia)

Botafogo won 3–2 on aggregate and advanced to the group stage.

5 March 2024
21:30 UTC−3

Nacional (Paraguay)	0–2	(Chile) Palestino
	Report	Carrasco 47'; Sosa 50'

Estadio Defensores del Chaco, Asunción
Attendance: 1,289
Referee: Jesús Valenzuela (Venezuela)
12 March 2024
21:30 UTC−3

Palestino (Chile)	1–3	(Paraguay) Nacional
Suárez 84'	Report	D. Duarte 44'; Gaona 48'; Alfaro 67'
Penalties
Sosa (penalty scored); Dávila (penalty scored); Chamorro (penalty scored)	3–1	(penalty scored) Orzuza; (penalty missed) Ojeda; (penalty missed) Blasi; (penalty missed) Santacruz

Estadio El Teniente, Rancagua
Attendance: 1,434
Referee: Andrés Matonte (Uruguay)

Tied 3–3 on aggregate, Palestino won on penalties and advanced to the group stage.

7 March 2024
20:30 UTC−4

Always Ready (Bolivia)	1–0	(Uruguay) Nacional
Rodrígues 13'	Report

Estadio Municipal de Villa Ingenio, El Alto
Attendance: 21,000
Referee: Jhon Ospina (Colombia)
14 March 2024
21:30 UTC−3

Nacional (Uruguay)	2–1	(Bolivia) Always Ready
Lozano 7'; Antoni 90+3'	Report	Rodrígues 45+3'
Penalties
Santander (penalty scored); Zabala (penalty scored); Carneiro (penalty scored); Antoni (penalty scored); Bentancourt (penalty scored)	5–4	(penalty scored) Caicedo; (penalty scored) Del Valle; (penalty missed) Suárez; (penalty scored) Robson Matheus; (penalty scored) Terrazas

Estadio Gran Parque Central, Montevideo
Attendance: 35,396
Referee: Darío Herrera (Argentina)

Tied 2–2 on aggregate, Nacional won on penalties and advanced to the group stage.

6 March 2024
21:30 UTC−3

Sportivo Trinidense (Paraguay)	1–1	(Chile) Colo-Colo
Salcedo 36'	Report	Zavala 60'

Estadio La Huerta, Asunción
Attendance: 2,611
Referee: Alexis Herrera (Venezuela)
13 March 2024
21:30 UTC−3

Colo-Colo (Chile)	2–1	(Paraguay) Sportivo Trinidense
Gil 4'; Palacios 31' (pen.)	Report	Flores 33'

Estadio Monumental David Arellano, Santiago
Attendance: 28,511
Referee: Anderson Daronco (Brazil)

Colo-Colo won 3–2 on aggregate and advanced to the group stage.
