= 2024 Copa Sudamericana first stage =

South American football tournament stage

The 2024 Copa Sudamericana first stage was played from 5 to 7 March 2024. A total of 32 teams competed in the first stage to decide 16 of the 32 places in the group stage of the 2024 Copa Sudamericana.

== Draw ==
The draw for the first stage was held on 19 December 2023, 12:00 PYST (UTC−3), at the CONMEBOL Convention Centre in Luque, Paraguay.

For the first stage, the 32 teams involved were divided into eight pots according to their national association. The 32 teams were drawn into 16 ties, with the four teams from each national association being drawn against a rival from the same association in two ties per association.

First stage draw
Bolivia	Chile	Colombia	Ecuador
(Bolivia) Jorge Wilstermann; (Bolivia) Nacional Potosí; (Bolivia) Real Tomayapo; (Bolivia) Universitario de Vinto	(Chile) Coquimbo Unido; (Chile) Everton; (Chile) Universidad Católica; (Chile) Unión La Calera	(Colombia) Independiente Medellín; (Colombia) América de Cali; (Colombia) Deportes Tolima; (Colombia) Alianza	(Ecuador) Delfín; (Ecuador) Universidad Católica; (Ecuador) Técnico Universitario; (Ecuador) Deportivo Cuenca
Paraguay	Peru	Uruguay	Venezuela
(Paraguay) Guaraní; (Paraguay) Olimpia; (Paraguay) Sportivo Ameliano; (Paraguay) Sportivo Luqueño	(Peru) Sport Huancayo; (Peru) ADT; (Peru) Deportivo Garcilaso; (Peru) Universidad César Vallejo	(Uruguay) Montevideo Wanderers; (Uruguay) Racing; (Uruguay) Cerro Largo; (Uruguay) Danubio	(Venezuela) Carabobo; (Venezuela) Deportivo La Guaira; (Venezuela) Metropolitanos; (Venezuela) Rayo Zuliano

Notes

1. ^{COL} Club drawn as Alianza Petrolera.

== Format ==
In the first stage, each tie was played on a single-leg basis, with the winner being decided in a penalty shoot-out in case of a draw after 90 minutes.

The 16 winners of the first stage advanced to the group stage to join the 12 teams directly qualified for that stage (six from Argentina and six from Brazil), and four teams transferred from the Copa Libertadores (the four teams eliminated in the third stage of qualifying).

== Matches ==
Matches in this stage were played on 5–7 March 2024.

Team 1	Score	Team 2
Universitario de Vinto (Bolivia)	0–2	(Bolivia) Nacional Potosí
Real Tomayapo (Bolivia)	0–0 (4–3 p)	(Bolivia) Jorge Wilstermann
Everton (Chile)	0–1	(Chile) Unión La Calera
Universidad Católica (Chile)	0–2	(Chile) Coquimbo Unido
Deportes Tolima (Colombia)	0–0 (2–4 p)	(Colombia) Independiente Medellín
Alianza (Colombia)	2–1	(Colombia) América de Cali
Deportivo Cuenca (Ecuador)	2–5	(Ecuador) Delfín
Técnico Universitario (Ecuador)	0–3	(Ecuador) Universidad Católica
Guaraní (Paraguay)	0–1	(Paraguay) Sportivo Luqueño
Sportivo Ameliano (Paraguay)	2–0	(Paraguay) Olimpia
Deportivo Garcilaso (Peru)	0–0 (4–3 p)	(Peru) ADT
Universidad César Vallejo (Peru)	2–0	(Peru) Sport Huancayo
Montevideo Wanderers (Uruguay)	0–1	(Uruguay) Danubio
Racing (Uruguay)	2–0	(Uruguay) Cerro Largo
Carabobo (Venezuela)	1–1 (4–5 p)	(Venezuela) Metropolitanos
Rayo Zuliano (Venezuela)	0–0 (4–2 p)	(Venezuela) Deportivo La Guaira

6 March 2024
18:00 UTC−4

Universitario de Vinto (Bolivia)	0–2	(Bolivia) Nacional Potosí
	Report	Callejo 6'; Cristaldo 87' (pen.)

Estadio Félix Capriles, Cochabamba (Note: Universitario de Vinto played their home match at Estadio Félix Capriles, Cochabamba instead of their regular stadium Estadio Hipólito Lazarte, Vinto which did not meet CONMEBOL requirements.)
Attendance: 1,496
Referee: Ángel Arteaga (Venezuela)

Nacional Potosí advanced to the group stage (BOL 1).

5 March 2024
18:00 UTC−4

Real Tomayapo (Bolivia)	0–0	(Bolivia) Jorge Wilstermann
	Report
Penalties
Graneros (penalty scored); Tomianovic (penalty scored); Cantillo (penalty scored); Noble (penalty scored); Hernández (penalty missed)	4–3	(penalty scored) Nahuelpán; (penalty missed) Cardozo; (penalty scored) Castillo; (penalty scored) Esparza; (penalty missed) Chiatti

Estadio IV Centenario, Tarija
Referee: Kevin Ortega (Peru)

Real Tomayapo advanced to the group stage (BOL 2).

6 March 2024
19:00 UTC−3

Everton (Chile)	0–1	(Chile) Unión La Calera
	Report	Ferreyra 83'

Estadio El Teniente, Rancagua (Note: Everton played their home match at Estadio El Teniente, Rancagua instead of their regular stadium Estadio Sausalito, Viña del Mar.)
Attendance: 1,348
Referee: Paulo Zanovelli (Brazil)

Unión La Calera advanced to the group stage (CHI 1).

5 March 2024
19:00 UTC−3

Universidad Católica (Chile)	0–2	(Chile) Coquimbo Unido
	Report	Canales 52' (o.g.); Johansen 87' (pen.)

Estadio Ester Roa, Concepción (Note: Universidad Católica played their home match at Estadio Ester Roa, Concepción (originally scheduled at Estadio Nacional Julio Martínez Prádanos, Santiago) instead of their regular stadium Estadio San Carlos de Apoquindo, Santiago which was being rebuilt.)
Attendance: 9,009
Referee: Bráulio Machado (Brazil)

Coquimbo Unido advanced to the group stage (CHI 2).

5 March 2024
21:00 UTC−5

Deportes Tolima (Colombia)	0–0	(Colombia) Independiente Medellín
	Report
Penalties
Guzmán (penalty scored); Hurtado (penalty scored); Lucumí (penalty missed); Hernández (penalty missed)	2–4	(penalty scored) L. Chaverra; (penalty scored) Lima; (penalty scored) Peralta; (penalty scored) Monsalve

Estadio Manuel Murillo Toro, Ibagué
Attendance: 12,444
Referee: Andrés Matonte (Uruguay)

Independiente Medellín advanced to the group stage (COL 1).

6 March 2024
21:00 UTC−5

Alianza (Colombia)	2–1	(Colombia) América de Cali
Batalla 21'; Colpa 48'	Report	C. Barrios 90+6'

Estadio Metropolitano Roberto Meléndez, Barranquilla (Note: Alianza played their home match at Estadio Metropolitano Roberto Meléndez, Barranquilla (originally scheduled at Estadio Daniel Villa Zapata, Barrancabermeja) instead of their regular stadium Estadio Armando Maestre Pavajeau, Valledupar which did not meet CONMEBOL requirements.)
Attendance: 0 (Note: The Alianza v América de Cali match was played behind closed doors due to security concerns.)
Referee: Esteban Ostojich (Uruguay)

Alianza advanced to the group stage (COL 2).

6 March 2024
19:30 UTC−5

Deportivo Cuenca (Ecuador)	2–5	(Ecuador) Delfín
Becerra 69', 90+3'	Report	Angulo 9', 59'; Gariglio 30'; Oyola 41'; Fratta 74' (o.g.)

Estadio Banco Guayaquil, Quito (Note: Deportivo Cuenca played their home match at Estadio Banco Guayaquil, Quito instead of their regular stadium Estadio Alejandro Serrano Aguilar, Cuenca which did not meet CONMEBOL requirements.)
Attendance: 2,046
Referee: Manuel Vergara (Chile)

Delfín advanced to the group stage (ECU 1).

7 March 2024
21:00 UTC−5

Técnico Universitario (Ecuador)	0–3	(Ecuador) Universidad Católica
	Report	Díaz 3', 47'; Cifuente 11'

Estadio Bellavista, Ambato
Attendance: 9,190
Referee: Jhon Hinestroza (Colombia)

Universidad Católica advanced to the group stage (ECU 2).

6 March 2024
21:30 UTC−3

Guaraní (Paraguay)	0–1	(Paraguay) Sportivo Luqueño
	Report	Fernández 87'

Estadio Defensores del Chaco, Asunción (Note: Guaraní played their home match at Estadio Defensores del Chaco, Asunción instead of their regular stadium Estadio Rogelio Livieres, Asunción which did not meet CONMEBOL requirements.)
Attendance: 7,325
Referee: Piero Maza (Chile)

Sportivo Luqueño advanced to the group stage (PAR 1).

7 March 2024
21:30 UTC−3

Sportivo Ameliano (Paraguay)	2–0	(Paraguay) Olimpia
González 27'; Samudio 31'	Report

Estadio Defensores del Chaco, Asunción (Note: Sportivo Ameliano played their home match at Estadio Defensores del Chaco, Asunción instead of their regular stadium Estadio José Tomás Silva, Asunción which did not meet CONMEBOL requirements.)
Attendance: 18,746
Referee: Flavio de Souza (Brazil)

Sportivo Ameliano advanced to the group stage (PAR 2).

5 March 2024
19:30 UTC−5

Deportivo Garcilaso (Peru)	0–0	(Peru) ADT
	Report
Penalties
Chicaiza (penalty scored); Cuero (penalty missed); Gómez (penalty scored); Gonzáles (penalty scored); Erustes (penalty scored)	4–3	(penalty scored) Cedrón; (penalty scored) da Silva; (penalty missed) Rambal; (penalty scored) Gamero; (penalty missed) Rojas

Estadio Garcilaso, Cusco
Attendance: 8,413
Referee: Augusto Aragón (Ecuador)

Deportivo Garcilaso advanced to the group stage (PER 1).

7 March 2024
19:30 UTC−5

Universidad César Vallejo (Peru)	2–0	(Peru) Sport Huancayo
Vélez 71'; Mena 78'	Report

Estadio Mansiche, Trujillo
Referee: Guillermo Guerrero (Ecuador)

Universidad César Vallejo advanced to the group stage (PER 2).

6 March 2024
21:30 UTC−3

Montevideo Wanderers (Uruguay)	0–1	(Uruguay) Danubio
	Report	Fracchia 55'

Parque Alfredo Víctor Viera, Montevideo
Attendance: 2,072
Referee: Carlos Benítez (Paraguay)

Danubio advanced to the group stage (URU 1).

7 March 2024
19:00 UTC−3

Racing (Uruguay)	2–0	(Uruguay) Cerro Largo
Sosa 24'; Verón Lupi 79'	Report

Estadio Centenario, Montevideo (Note: Racing played their home match at Estadio Centenario, Montevideo instead of their regular stadium Estadio Osvaldo Roberto, Montevideo which did not meet CONMEBOL requirements.)
Attendance: 1,402
Referee: Juan Benítez (Paraguay)

Racing advanced to the group stage (URU 2).

5 March 2024
20:30 UTC−4

Carabobo (Venezuela)	1–1	(Venezuela) Metropolitanos
J. Ortiz 64' (pen.)	Report	C. Ortiz 7'
Penalties
F. Flores (penalty scored); Lujano (penalty scored); González (penalty scored); J. Ortiz (penalty scored); Apaolaza (penalty missed)	4–5	(penalty scored) Lucena; (penalty scored) Garcés; (penalty scored) Cuero; (penalty scored) R. Flores; (penalty scored) Bareiro

Estadio Misael Delgado, Valencia
Attendance: 1,126
Referee: Ivo Méndez (Bolivia)

Metropolitanos advanced to the group stage (VEN 1).

7 March 2024
18:00 UTC−4

Rayo Zuliano (Venezuela)	0–0	(Venezuela) Deportivo La Guaira
	Report
Penalties
L. Paz (penalty scored); Castro (penalty scored); Y. Paz (penalty scored); Faría (penalty scored)	4–2	(penalty scored) Arias; (penalty missed) Castellano; (penalty scored) Gutiérrez; (penalty missed) Parra

Estadio Brígido Iriarte, Caracas (Note: Rayo Zuliano played their home match at Estadio Brígido Iriarte, Caracas (originally scheduled at Estadio Metropolitano, Mérida) instead of their regular stadium Estadio José Pachencho Romero, Maracaibo which did not meet CONMEBOL requirements.)
Attendance: 1,065
Referee: Gery Vargas (Bolivia)

Rayo Zuliano advanced to the group stage (VEN 2).
