= Brayan Palmezano =

Venezuelan footballer (born 2000)

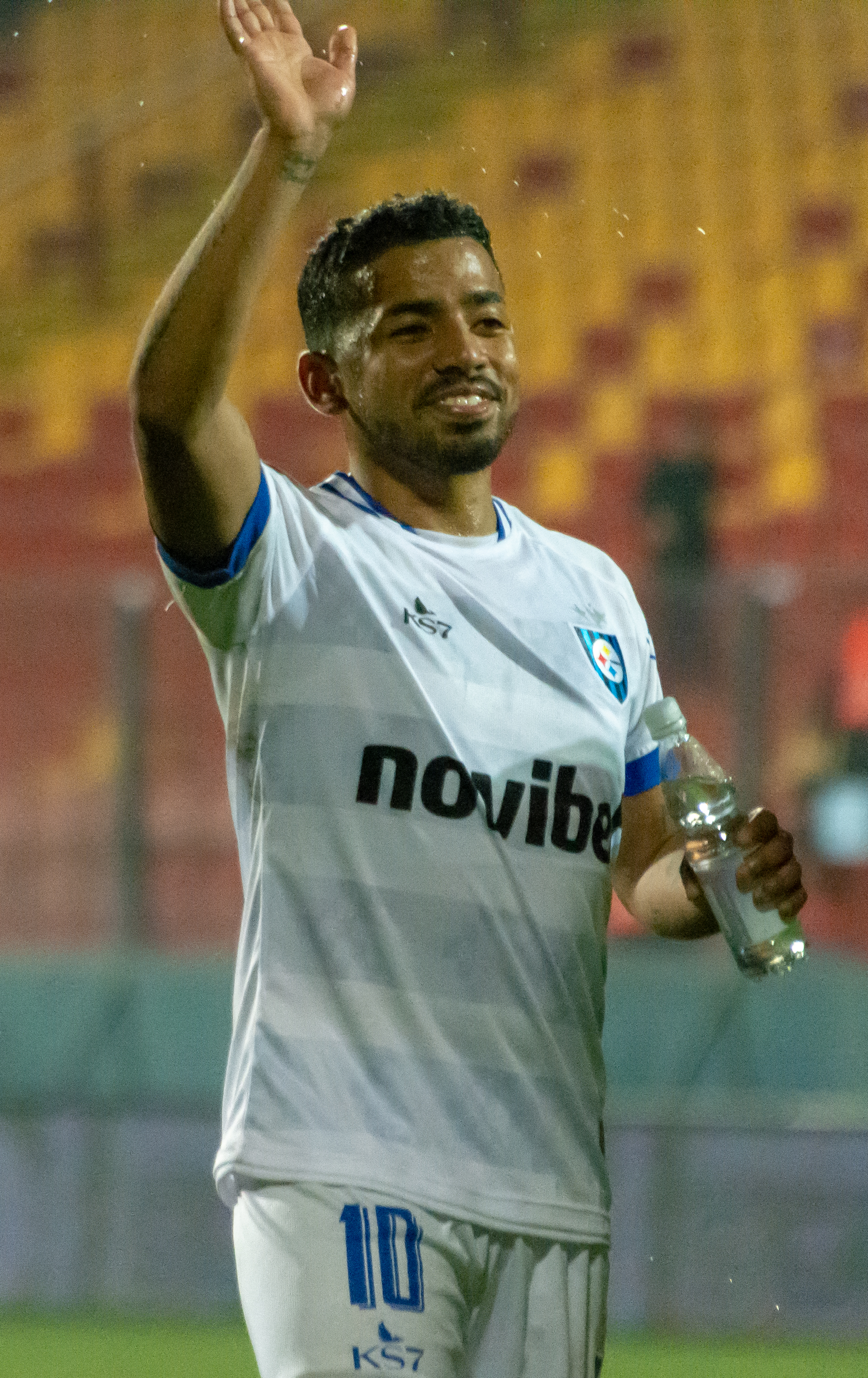
- Palmezano with Huachipato in 2023

Personal information
- Full name: Brayan Enrique Palmezano Reyes
- Date of birth: 17 September 2000 (age 26)
- Place of birth: Maracaibo, Venezuela
- Height: 1.68 m (5 ft 6 in)
- Positions: Attacking midfielder; forward

Team information
- Current team: Deportivo Táchira

Youth career
- 2010–2016: Zulia

Senior career*
Years	Team	Apps	(Gls)
2016–2018	Zulia	40	(10)
2019–2025	Huachipato	72	(7)
2025–2026	Atromitos	17	(2)
2026–	Deportivo Táchira	1	(0)

International career^{‡}
2016–2017	Venezuela U17	9	(0)
2017–2019	Venezuela U20	7	(0)
- * Club domestic league appearances and goals as of 9 March 2026 ‡ National team caps and goals as of 07:36, 13 August 2023. (UTC).

Brayan Enrique Palmezano Reyes (born 17 September 2000) is a Venezuelan professional footballer who plays as an attacking midfielder or a forward for Venezuelan Primera División club Deportivo Táchira. He's a former Venezuelan youth international.

== Club career ==
Palmezano made his senior debut for Zulia in a 2016 Copa Venezuela game against Deportivo Lara in September 2016, 4 days after his 16th birthday. He scored his first goal for the club in a 2–0 cup victory over Estudiantes de Caracas. He scored against another Caracas-based side, Caracas FC, in the league the following season, a first-minute goal in a 3–0 win.

== International career ==
In April 2017, Palmezano was called up to the Venezuela under-20 side for the first time.

== Career statistics ==
=== Club ===
As of 5 June 2017

Club performance			League		Cup		Continental		Total	
Club	Season	League	Apps	Goals	Apps	Goals	Apps	Goals	Apps	Goals
Venezuela			Primera División		Copa Venezuela		Continental		Total	
Zulia	2016	Primera División	0	0	4	1	0	0	4	1
Zulia	2017	Primera División	8	2	0	0	1 (Note: Appearances in the Copa Libertadores)	0	9	2
Zulia	Total		8	2	4	1	1	0	13	3
Total	Venezuela		8	2	4	1	1	0	13	3
Total	Career total		8	2	4	1	1	0	13	3
