= Luan Cândido =

Brazilian footballer

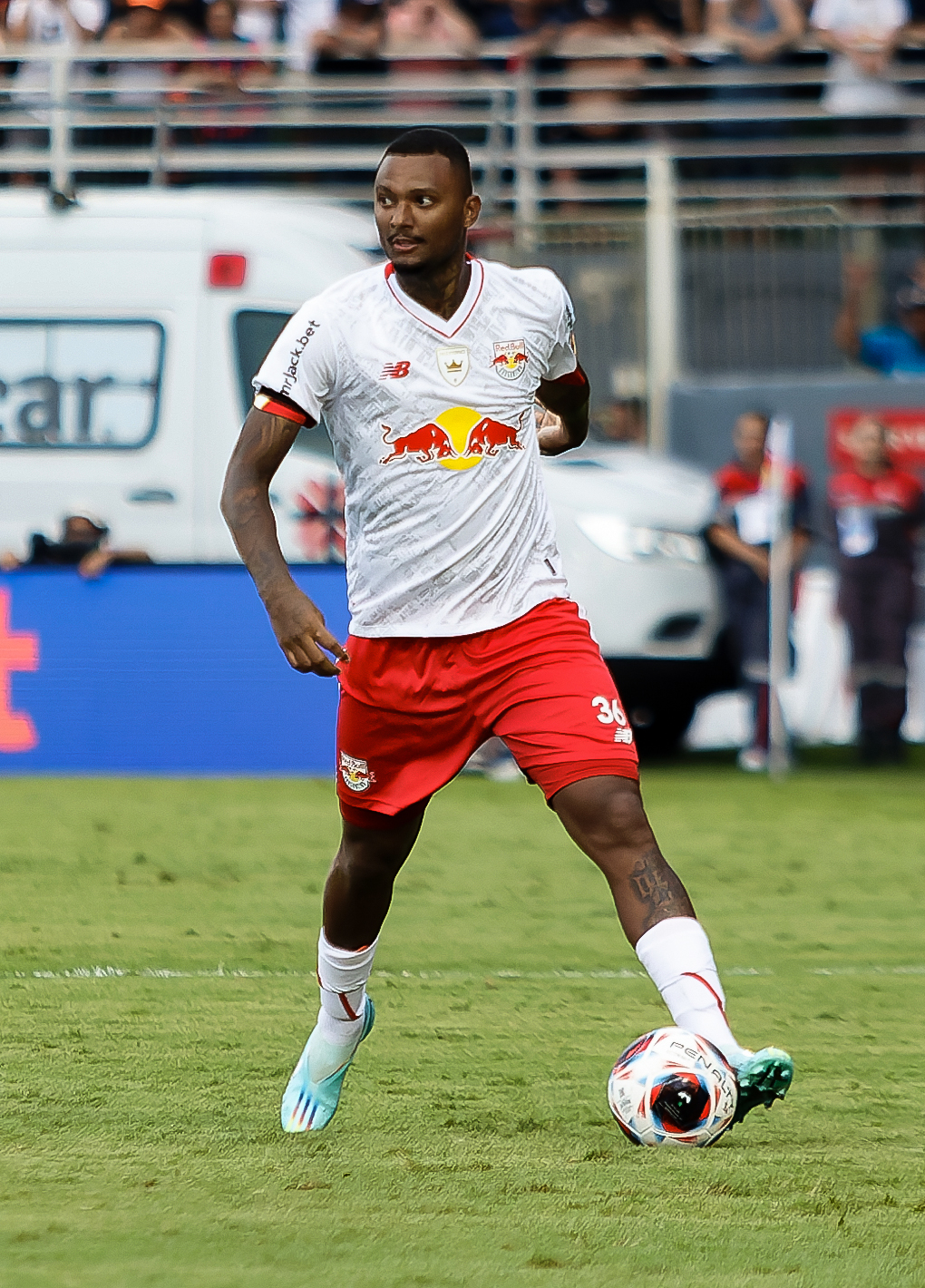
- Luan Cândido with Red Bull Bragantino in 2023

Personal information
- Full name: Luan Cândido de Almeida
- Date of birth: 2 February 2001 (age 25)
- Place of birth: Visconde do Rio Branco, Brazil
- Height: 1.84 m (6 ft 0 in)
- Position: Left-back

Team information
- Current team: Vitória
- Number: 36

Youth career
- –2019: Palmeiras
- 2019–2020: RB Leipzig

Senior career*
Years	Team	Apps	(Gls)
2020–2021	RB Leipzig	0	(0)
2020–2021	→ Red Bull Bragantino (loan)	36	(4)
2022–	Red Bull Bragantino	106	(14)
2025	→ Grêmio (loan)	1	(0)
2025	→ Sport Recife (loan)	16	(1)
2026–	→ Vitória (loan)	4	(0)

International career^{‡}
2016	Brazil U15	1	(0)
2017	Brazil U17	4	(0)
2018–	Brazil U20	8	(1)
- * Club domestic league appearances and goals as of 8 April 2026 ‡ National team caps and goals as of 13:12, 31 January 2020 (UTC)

Luan Cândido de Almeida (born 2 February 2001) is a Brazilian footballer who plays as a left-back for Vitória, on loan from Red Bull Bragantino. He was included in The Guardian's "Next Generation 2018".

== Club career ==
In January 2022, Cândido joined Red Bull Bragantino on a permanent deal after spending two years on loan at the club.

== Career statistics ==
=== Club ===
As of 11 November 2020.

Club	Season	League			State league		Cup		Continental		Other		Total	
Club	Season	Division	Apps	Goals	Apps	Goals	Apps	Goals	Apps	Goals	Apps	Goals	Apps	Goals
RB Leipzig	2019–20	Bundesliga	0	0	–		0	0	0	0	–		0	0
Red Bull Bragantino (loan)	2020	Série A	2	0	3 (Note: Appearances in the Campeonato Paulista)	0	1 (Note: Appearances in the Copa do Brasil)	0	0	0	0	0	3	0
Career total			0	0	3	0	0	0	0	0	0	0	3	0
