= Maximiliano Salas =

Argentine footballer (born 1997)

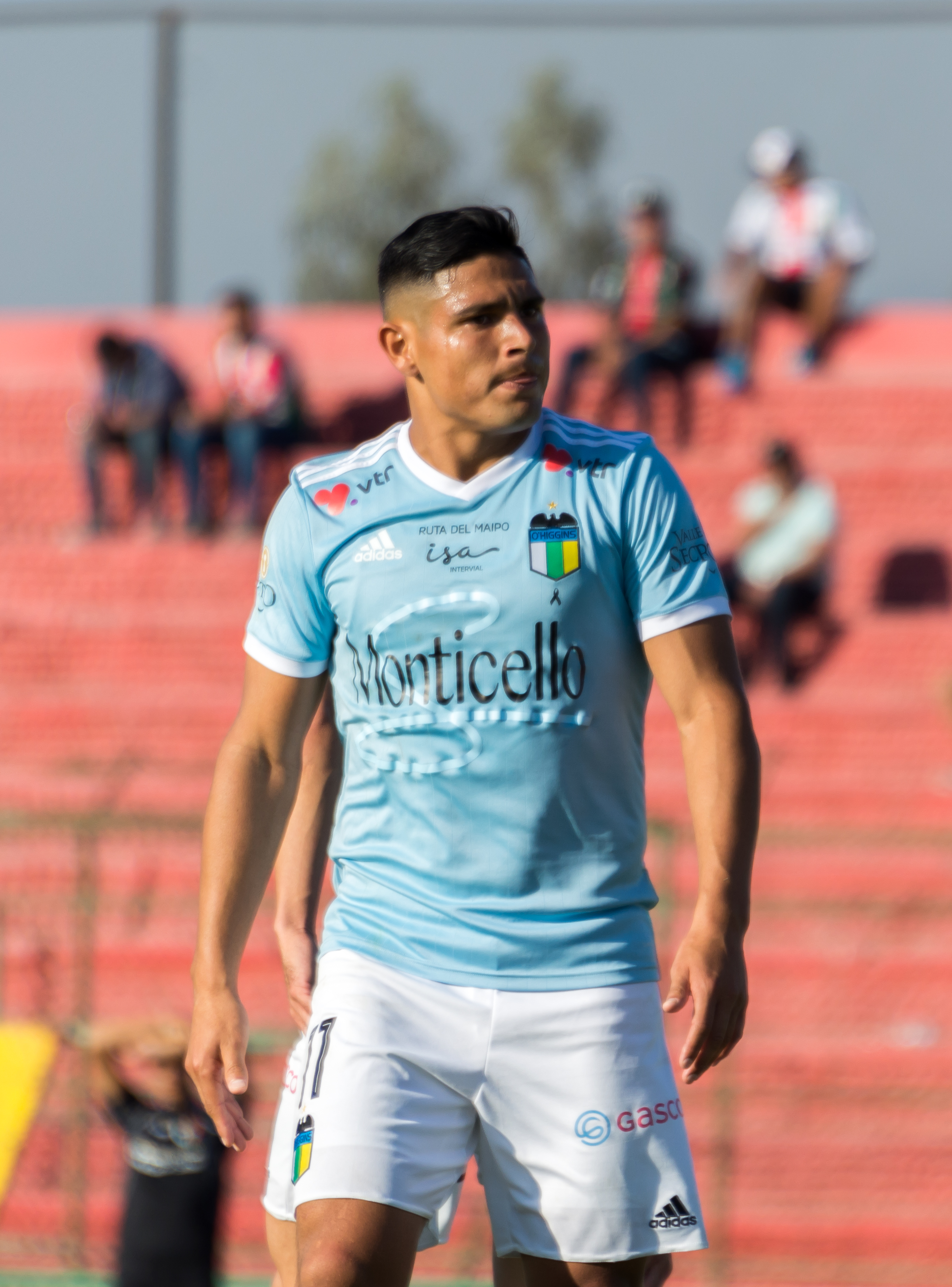
- Salas with O'Higgins in 2019

Personal information
- Full name: Maximiliano Nahuel Salas
- Date of birth: 1 December 1997 (age 28)
- Place of birth: Curuzú Cuatiá, Argentina
- Height: 1.72 m (5 ft 8 in)
- Position: Forward

Team information
- Current team: Independiente Rivadavia (on loan from River Plate)

Youth career
- All Boys

Senior career*
Years	Team	Apps	(Gls)
2016–2018	All Boys	74	(12)
2018–2019	→ O'Higgins (loan)	29	(10)
2019–2022	Necaxa	85	(12)
2022	→ Palestino (loan)	12	(7)
2023–2025	Palestino	25	(8)
2024	→ Racing Club (loan)	38	(5)
2025	Racing Club	0	(0)
2025–	River Plate	27	(3)
2026–	→ Independiente Rivadavia	0	(0)
- * Club domestic league appearances and goals as of 17:47, 10 July 2026 (UTC)

Maximiliano Nahuel Salas (born 1 December 1997), also known as Maxi Salas, is an Argentine professional footballer who plays as a forward for Argentine Primera División club Independiente Rivadavia, on loan from River Plate.

== Career ==
Salas joined Chilean club Palestino in the second half of 2022 from Mexican club Necaxa on a deal until December of the same year with an option to buy.

In 2024, Salas was loaned out to Racing Club from Palestino.

On July 11 2025 Salas was announced as a new player for River Plate, after the club triggered a US$8m release clause. Salas scored his first goal in his debut match against Platense, in a match that ended with victory of River Plate for 3–1.

== Honours ==
Racing Club

- Copa Sudamericana: 2024
- Recopa Sudamericana: 2025
