= Gustavo Tejera =

Uruguayan football referee (born 1988)

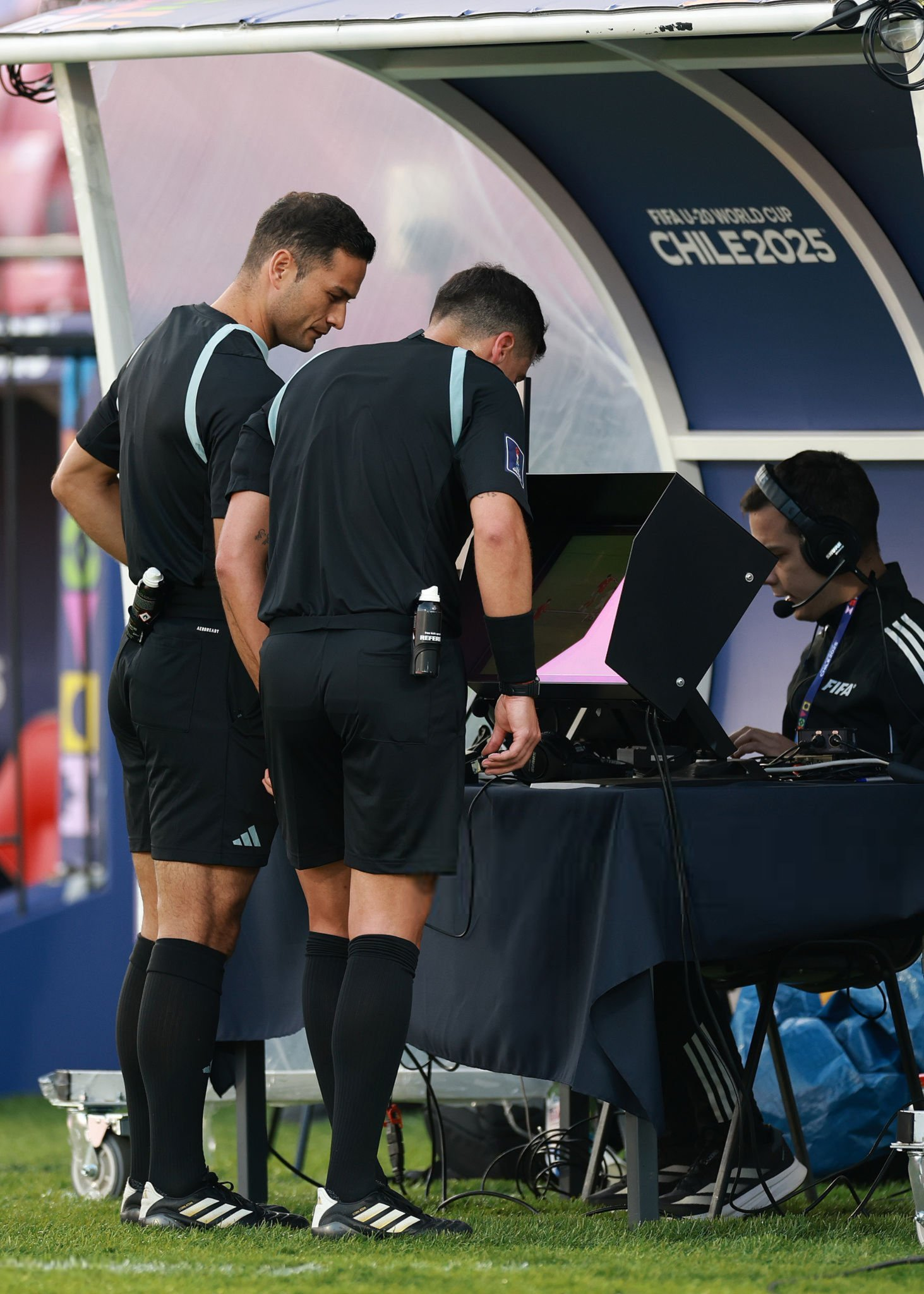
- Tejera (right) checking VAR
- Born: Gustavo Adrián Tejera Capo; 20 January 1988 (age 38); Montevideo, Uruguay
- Other occupation: Insurance broker

Domestic
Years	League	Role
2015–present	Liga AUF Uruguaya	Referee

International
Years	League	Role
2018–present	FIFA listed	Referee

Gustavo Adrián Tejera Capo (born 20 January 1988) is a Uruguayan football referee who has been on the FIFA International Referees List since 2018.

== Career ==
Tejera was born in Montevideo in January 1988. He became an active referee in 2014 by ascending to the Liga AUF Uruguaya in 2015. In 2018, Tejera earned his FIFA badge, making his international debut at Copa Sudamericana one year later and at Copa Libertadores in 2020.

At his home country's top-tier league, Tejera has overseen several clásicos between Peñarol and Nacional, including the final match of the 2025 Liga AUF Uruguaya in November 2025, where Nacional were crowned champions. In the Supercopa Uruguaya, Tejera was chosen for the 2020 edition game between Liverpool and Nacional.

Tejera has also taken part in international competitions of national teams, including CONMEBOL qualification matches for the FIFA World Cup, the 2023 FIFA U-17 World Cup, and the 2025 FIFA U-20 World Cup.

He was appointed to the 2025 FIFA Club World Cup and, in April 2026, he was selected for the 2026 FIFA World Cup. Tejera took charge of the group stage match between Mexico and South Korea. He was also appointed to the round of 32 knockout match between Australia and Egypt.

Aside from his refereeing career, Tejera is an insurance broker and has two children.
