= Andrés Rojas =

Colombian football referee (born 1984)

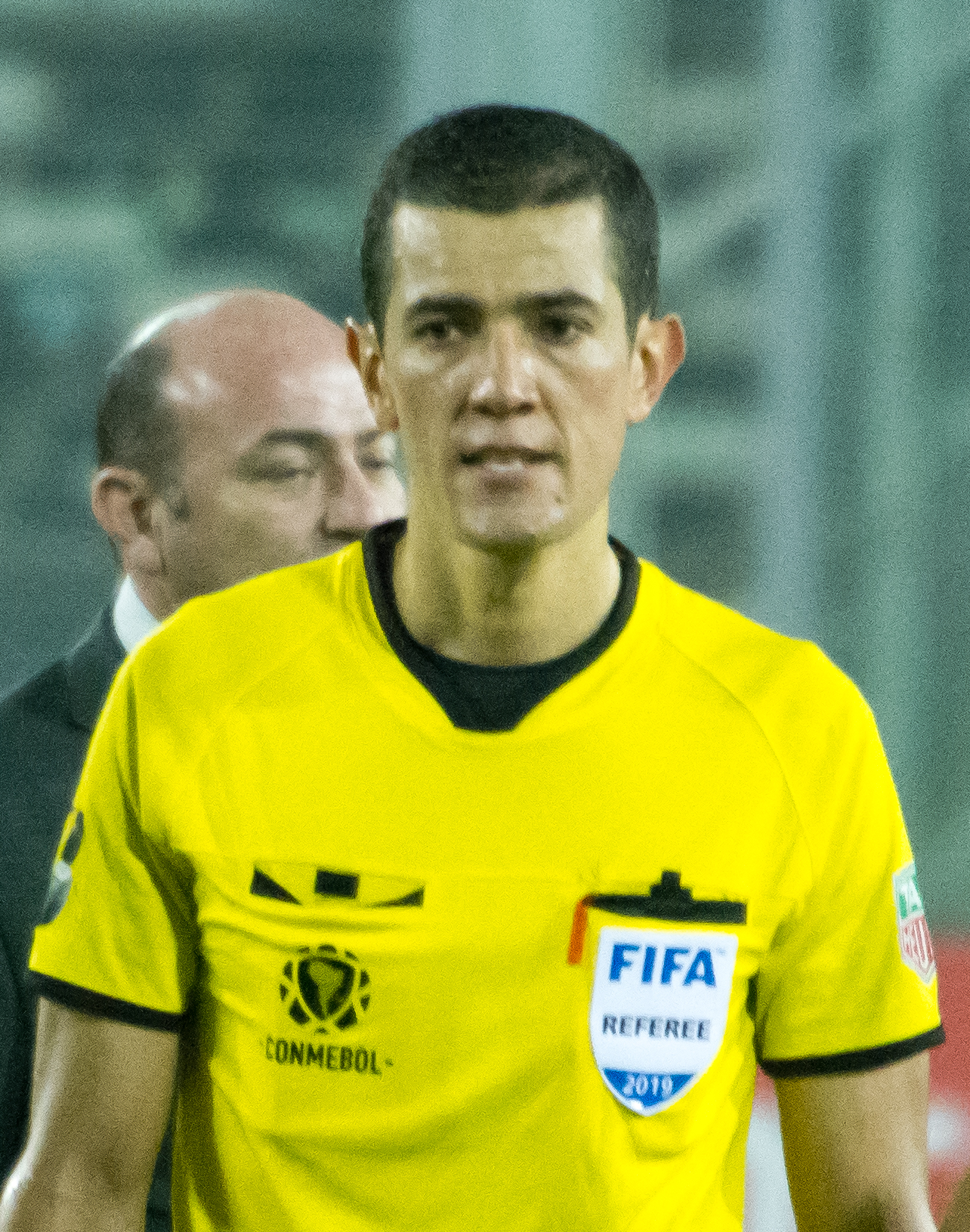
- Rojas in April 2019
- Born: Andrés José Rojas Noguera; 5 December 1984 (age 41); Bogotá, Colombia

Domestic
Years	League	Role
2012–present	Liga DIMAYOR	Referee

International
Years	League	Role
2017–present	FIFA listed	Referee

Andrés José Rojas Noguera (born 5 December 1984) is a Colombian football referee who has been on the FIFA International Referees List since 2017.

== Career ==
Born in December 1984 in Bogotá, Rojas began his career as a professional referee in Liga DIMAYOR, Colombia's top-tier league, in a February 2012 game between Patriotas Boyacá and Deportivo Pasto in Estadio La Independencia, which ended in a 0–0 draw. Rojas obtained his FIFA badge in 2017, making his international debut in a Copa Sudamericana match that same year. He has taken part in important roles, both in Colombia's domestic league and international level.

In 2019, Rojas was part of the officiating team of two youth FIFA World Cups: the U-17 World Cup in Brazil and the U-20 World Cup in Poland, serving as a video assistant referee in Poland. Other tournaments in the international field include games in Copa Libertadores and CONMEBOL qualification for the FIFA World Cup. In 2025, Rojas appeared again at a youth tournament at the 2025 FIFA U-20 World Cup in Chile but did not officiate any match due to a CONMEBOL request as a consequence of a sanction he gave at a previous match for the Copa Libertadores between Flamengo and Estudiantes de La Plata, showing a red card to Flamengo's player Gonzalo Plata in a mistaken decision.

Rojas officiated in the 2021 Copa América in Brazil, and, in April 2026, he was selected for the 2026 FIFA World Cup.
