= Cristián Garay =

Chilean football referee (born 1989)

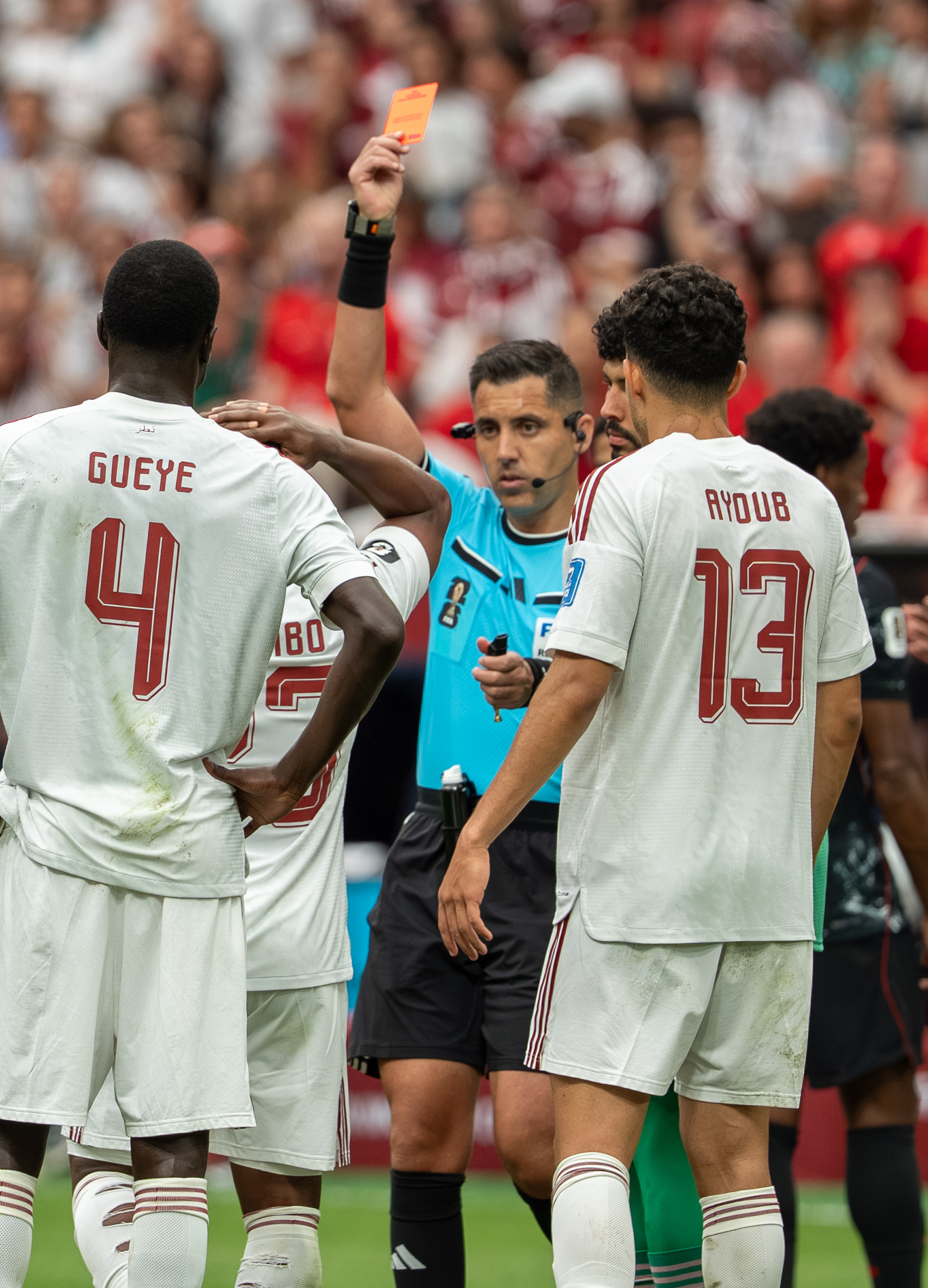
- Garay showing a red card to Assim Madibo at the 2026 World Cup
- Full name: Cristián Marcelo Garay Reyes
- Born: 8 April 1989 (age 37); Macul, Chile

Domestic
Years	League	Role
2018–	Liga de Primera	Referee

International
Years	League	Role
2019–	FIFA listed	Referee

Cristián Marcelo Garay Reyes (born 8 April 1989) is a Chilean football referee who has been on the FIFA International List of Referees since 2019.

== Career ==
Born in April 1989 in Macul, Chile, Garay ascended to the Liga de Primera in 2018 and received his FIFA badge one year later. He previously refereed in the Campeonato Nacional Primera B, the second division of Chilean football. Garay is part of the "new generation" of Chilean referees who are mentored by Roberto Tobar, a former referee himself.

Within CONMEBOL, Garay has overseen matches at Copa Sudamericana and Copa Libertadores, as well as qualification games for the FIFA World Cup. He was also appointed as one of the two Chilean referees at the 2024 Copa América in the United States, the other being Piero Maza. In the tournament, Garay refereed a group stage match between Ecuador and Jamaica at Allegiant Stadium in Paradise, Nevada.

Garay has been involved in high-stakes matches as well as in some controversies, including the request by Argentine international referee Javier Castrilli to dismiss him from Liga de Primera games. Castrilli had been chosen as the head of the Commission of Referees of Chile. That same year, Garay was heavily criticized by manager Francisco Meneghini, who considered that he had made detrimental decisions against his team, Everton Viña del Mar. In 2025, Garay was selected for the FIFA Club World Cup.

Other controversies included one in a March 2026 match in the Saudi Pro League where he oversaw a game between Al Fateh SC and Al Hilal, giving a penalty kick to Al Fateh in the 96th minute of the match; upon being called by the video assistant referee, Garay retracted his decision.

In local football, Garay refereed Universidad Católica and Colo-Colo in April 2023. He was selected as a referee for the 2026 FIFA World Cup, where his only appearance was in the Group B match between co-hosts Canada and Qatar.

== Selected performances ==
2026 FIFA World Cup – North America
Date	Match	Result	Round	Venue
18 June 2026	Canada – Qatar	6–0	Group stage	BC Place, Vancouver
