= 2022 Supercopa Internacional =

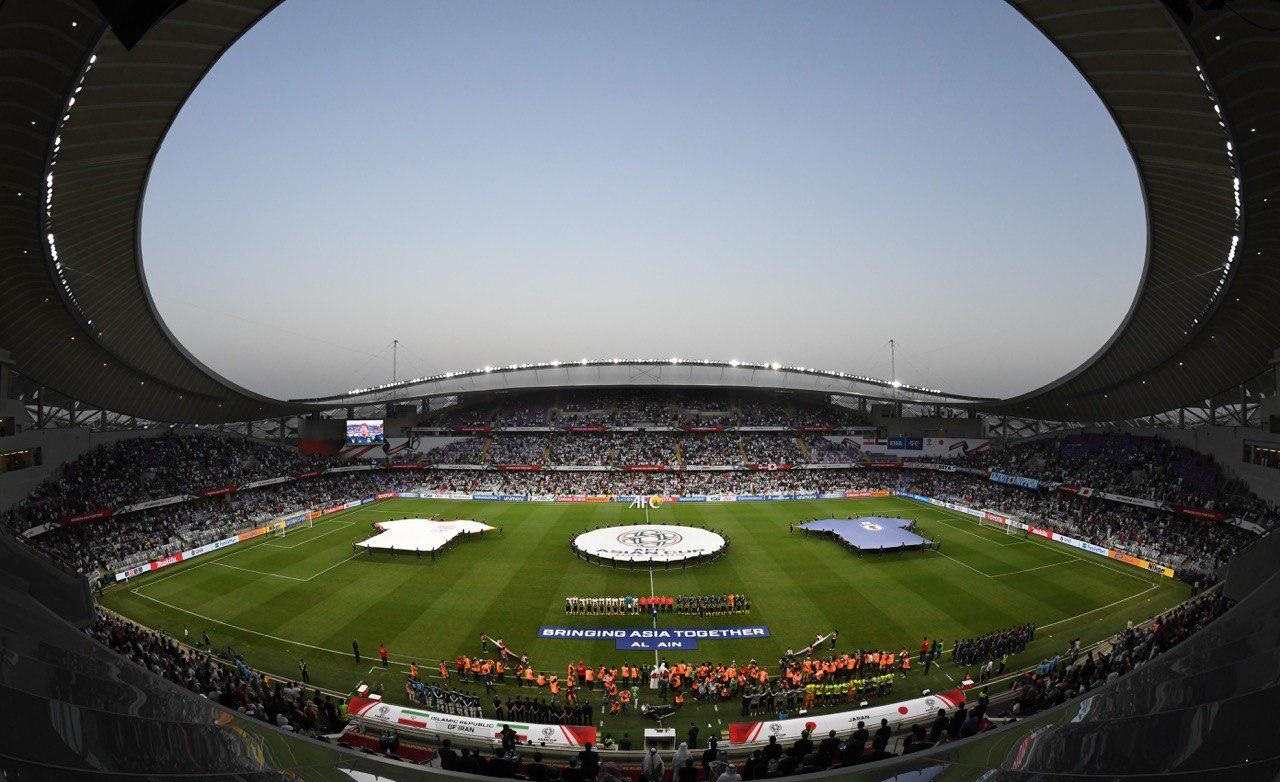
- The Hazza bin Zayed Stadium in Al Ain, hosted the match
Boca Juniors	Racing
1	2
- Date: 20 January 2023
- Venue: Hazza bin Zayed Stadium, Al Ain, Abu Dhabi, UAE
- Referee: Fernando Rapallini

The 2022 Supercopa Internacional was the 1st edition of the Supercopa Internacional, an international version of the Supercopa Argentina, the annual football match contested by the winners of the Primera División and Copa Argentina competitions.

The competition was held in Al Ain, Emirate of Abu Dhabi, United Arab Emirates, after an agreement between the AFA and the Abu Dhabi Sports Council that includes the organization of four editions of this competition (up to 2026) in that part of the Middle Eastern country.

The match was played between Boca Juniors (winners of 2022 Primera División) and Racing (winners of 2022 Trofeo de Campeones) on 20 January 2023 at Hazza bin Zayed Stadium.

Racing defeated Boca Juniors 2–1 to win their first title.

== Qualified teams ==
Team	Qualification	Previous app.
Boca Juniors	2022 Primera División champions	(none)
Racing	2022 Trofeo de Campeones champions	(none)

Note: Bold indicates winning years

== Match ==
=== Summary ===
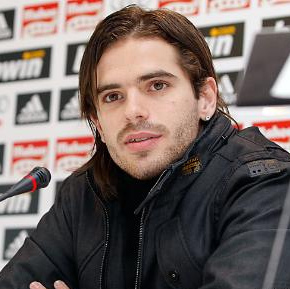
Racing manager Fernando Gago won his second title with the club

The match started slowly and heavily, with Boca Juniors waiting to see what would happen, and Racing still assimilating their new players (Maximiliano Romero, Juan Nardoni), so the match lacked desire and intent. Boca Juniors did not take a dominant role while Racing lacked intensity and aggression. Boca Juniors took the lead with a goal by defender Facundo Roncaglia but Johan Carbonero tied for Racing just three minutes later in an effective counterattack.

After the goals, Racing gradually picked up the pace, with Maxi Rodríguez capitalising the disconnect between Pol Fernández and Luis Advíncula. On the opposite side, Maximiliano Moralez and Carbonero moved into that space, taking advantage of their speed. The Colombian striker had two chances, a right-footed shot from outside the penalty area that Javier García saved with a great effort, and a free kick that Boca Juniors goalkeeper saved again.

For the second half, manager Hugo Ibarra sent Ezequiel Fernández to the pitch with the aim of adding rough mark to the midfield zone. Nevertheless, Racing continued attacking with Carbonero who sent a long pass to Nicolás Oroz, and then García stopped a shot by Aníbal Moreno. Luca Langoni and Luis Vázquez came off the bench to strengthen Boca Juniors' attacking line, although the team focused on pressing and counterattack.

Racing had a second chance with a pass from Jonathan Gómez to Carbonero, who dribbled García but ran out of space to score. And then it was Boca Juniors who almost celebrated with a header from Agustín Sández after a corner kick that went just wide.

And when it seemed that Boca was getting stronger and Racing looked exhausted from going so much, a penalty kick was awarded to the team from Avellaneda that Gonzalo Piovi turned into a goal to set the definitive 2–1 that allowed Racing to claim their first Supercopa Internacional title.

=== Details ===
2022 Supercopa Internacional
20 January 2023
12:30 UTC-3

Boca Juniors	1–2	Racing
Roncaglia 16'	Report	Carbonero 19'; Piovi 90+7' (pen.)

Hazza bin Zayed Stadium, Al Ain (UAE)
Referee: Fernando Rapallini

**Boca Juniors**	**Racing**

GK	13	(Argentina) Javier García (c)
DF	17	(Peru) Luis Advíncula
DF	2	(Argentina) Facundo Roncaglia
DF	3	(Argentina) Agustín Sández
DF	18	(Colombia) Frank Fabra
MF	8	(Argentina) Guillermo Fernández
MF	5	(Argentina) Alan Varela
MF	20	(Argentina) Juan Ramírez	(substituted off) 73'
FW	29	(Armenia) Norberto Briasco	(substituted off) 46'
FW	9	(Argentina) Darío Benedetto	(substituted off) 73'
FW	22	(Colombia) Sebastián Villa
Substitutes:
GK	12	(Argentina) Leandro Brey
DF	15	(Argentina) Nicolás Valentini
DF	39	(Argentina) Gabriel Aranda
DF	57	(Argentina) Marcelo Weigandt
MF	10	(Paraguay) Óscar Romero
MF	11	(Argentina) Martín Payero
MF	21	(Argentina) Ezequiel Fernández	(substituted on) 46'
MF	36	(Argentina) Cristian Medina
FW	7	(Argentina) Exequiel Zeballos
FW	27	(Argentina) Nicolás Orsini
FW	38	(Argentina) Luis Vázquez	(substituted on) 73'
FW	41	(Argentina) Luca Langoni	(substituted on) 73'
Manager:
(Argentina) Hugo Ibarra

GK	21	(Chile) Gabriel Arias
DF	4	(Argentina) Iván Pillud (c)
DF	30	(Argentina) Leonardo Sigali
DF	48	(Argentina) Emiliano Insúa
DF	33	(Argentina) Gonzalo Piovi
MF	5	(Argentina) Juan Nardoni		(substituted off) 72'
MF	29	(Argentina) Aníbal Moreno		(substituted off) 90+9'
MF	27	(Argentina) Maximiliano Moralez
FW	23	(Argentina) Nicolás Oroz	(yellow card) 37'	(substituted off) 72'
FW	15	(Argentina) Maximiliano Romero		(substituted off) 62'
FW	17	(Colombia) Johan Carbonero	(yellow card) 89'	(substituted off) 90+8'
Substitutes:
GK	13	(Argentina) Matías Tagliamonte
DF	2	(Argentina) Juan José Cáceres
DF	8	(Argentina) Jonathan Galván		(substituted on) 90+9'
DF	16	(Chile) Óscar Opazo
DF	35	(Argentina) Santiago Quirós
MF	11	(Argentina) Jonathan Gómez		(substituted on) 72'
MF	14	(Argentina) Maico Quiroz		(substituted on) 90+8'
MF	18	(Colombia) Edwin Cardona
MF	24	(Argentina) Héctor Fértoli
FW	7	(Argentina) Gabriel Hauche		(substituted on) 72'
FW	9	(Argentina) Nicolás Reniero		(substituted on) 62'
FW	50	(Argentina) Román Fernández
Manager:
(Argentina) Fernando Gago

Assistant referees:
Juan Pablo Belatti
Diego Bonfá
Fourth official:
Pablo Echavarría
Fifth official:
Gabriel Chade
Video assistant referee:
Héctor Paletta
Assistant video assistant referees:
Fernando Espinoza
Pablo Dóvalo

**Match rules**

- 90 minutes.
- 30 minutes of extra time if necessary.
- Penalty shoot-out if scores still level.
- Twelve named substitutes.
- Maximum of five substitutions, with a sixth allowed in extra time.

=== Statistics ===
Overall
	Boca Juniors	Racing
Goals scored	1	2
Total shots	11	14
Shots on target	6	10
Ball possession	50%	50%
Corner kicks	7	5
Fouls committed	11	15
Offsides	3	1
Yellow cards	0	2
Red cards	0	0

2022 Supercopa Internacional winners
**Racing**
**1st Title**
