= Gonzalo Aguirre =

Gonzalo Aguirre may refer to:

- Gonzalo Aguirre Arriz (born 1962), Peruvian politician, vice-presidential candidate in the 2006 general election
- Gonzalo Aguirre Arenas (born 2003), Peruvian-Argentine footballer, played for Alianza Lima in 2024
- Gonzalo Aguirre Beltrán (1908–1996), Mexican anthropologist, director of the National Indigenous Institute
- Gonzalo Aguirre Ramírez (1940–2021), Uruguayan politician, vice president from 1990 to 1995
- Gonzalo Aguirre Villafán (born 1951), Bolivian politician from the Free Bolivia Movement
