= 2024 Club Alianza Lima season =

Alianza Lima
2024 season
- Manager: Alejandro Restrepo (until 27 July); Diego Ortíz (caretaker, 29 July–7 August); Mariano Soso (from 7 August)
- Stadium: Alejandro Villanueva Stadium
- Liga 1 Apertura: 4th
- Liga 1 Clausura: 2nd
- Copa Libertadores: Group stage
- Top goalscorer: League: Apertura: Hernán Barcos (7); Clausura: Hernán Barcos (7); All: Hernán Barcos (16)
- Biggest win: Alianza Lima 5–1 Comerciantes Unidos; Mannucci 0–4 Alianza Lima
- Biggest defeat: Cusco 3–0 Alianza Lima

The 2024 season was the 123rd in the history of Club Alianza Lima and their 85th consecutive season in the Peruvian top division. In addition to competing in the domestic league, the club also took part in the Copa Libertadores, where they were eliminated in the group stage.

== Transfers ==
=== In ===
Pos.	Player	Transferred from	Fee	Date	Source
MF	(Peru) Jhamir D'Arrigo	(Peru) Melgar	Undisclosed	1 January 2024	
DF	(Peru) Aldair Fuentes	(Spain) Fuenlabrada	Loan	1 January 2024	
DF	(Argentina) Juan Pablo Freytes	(Argentina) Newell's Old Boys	Loan	1 January 2024	
DF	(Peru) Renzo Garcés	(Peru) Universidad César Vallejo	Free	1 January 2024	
MF	(Argentina) Catriel Cabellos	(Argentina) Racing Club	Loan	1 January 2024	
MF	(Argentina) Adrián Arregui	(Argentina) Temperley	Free	1 January 2024	
FW	(Colombia) Kevin Serna	(Peru) Tarma	Undisclosed	1 January 2024	
FW	(Panama) Cecilio Waterman	(Chile) Cobresal	Free	3 January 2024	
DF	(Peru) Marco Huamán	(Peru) Sport Huancayo	Free	4 January 2024	
MF	(Uruguay) Sebastián Rodríguez	(Uruguay) Peñarol	Free	12 January 2024	
MF	(Peru) Cristian Neira	(Peru) Unión Comercio	Free	26 February 2024	
FW	(Venezuela) Jeriel De Santis	(Portugal) Boavista	Free	2 March 2024	
DF	(Peru) Erick Noriega	(Peru) Comerciantes Unidos	Free	1 July 2024	
MF	(Peru) Gonzalo Aguirre	(Argentina) Nueva Chicago	Loan	1 July 2024	
FW	(Peru) Matías Succar	(Peru) Mannucci	Undisclosed	19 July 2024	
DF	(Peru) Aldair Fuentes	(Spain) Fuenlabrada	Free	24 July 2024	
FW	(Peru) Kevin Quevedo	(Ecuador) Universidad Católica	Undisclosed	25 July 2024	
FW	(Peru) Paolo Guerrero	(Peru) Universidad César Vallejo	Free	31 August 2024	

=== Out ===
Pos.	Player	Transferred to	Fee	Date	Source
DF	(Peru) Aldair Fuentes	(Spain) Fuenlabrada	Loan return	30 June 2024	
DF	(Peru) Sebastián Aranda	(Peru) Unión Comercio	Loan	1 July 2024	
FW	(Colombia) Kevin Serna	(Brazil) Fluminense	Undisclosed	22 July 2024	
DF	(Peru) Yordi Vílchez	(Peru) Tarma	Loan	25 July 2024	
FW	(Venezuela) Jeriel De Santis	(Spain) Intercity	Loan	31 July 2024	
DF	(Peru) Nicolás Amasifuén	(Peru) Universidad César Vallejo	Loan	17 August 2024	

== Exhibition matches ==
15 January 2024 Noche Blanquiazul	Alianza Lima (Peru)	2–0	(Colombia) Once Caldas	Lima
21:00 UTC−5	Barcos 57', 61' (pen.)			Stadium: National Stadium

21 January 2024 Tarde Blanquiazul	Alianza Lima (Peru)	0–0	(Chile) Universidad Católica	Trujillo
				Stadium: Estadio Mansiche

20 March 2024 Friendly	Alianza Lima (Peru)	1–0	(Bolivia) Blooming	Lima
19:00 UTC−5	Serna 27'	Report		Stadium: Alejandro Villanueva Stadium

26 June 2024 Copa Ciudad de los Reyes SF	Alianza Lima (Peru)	2–3	(Bolivia) Bolívar	Lima
20:00 UTC−3	Lagos 2'; De Santis 6'; Fuentes (red card) 44'; Cabellos (red card) 70'	Report	Vaca 37'; Cordano (red card) 61'; Bruno Sávio 40', 88'	Stadium: Alejandro Villanueva Stadium

30 June 2024 Copa Ciudad de los Reyes TP	Alianza Lima (Peru)	1–1	(Peru) Sporting Cristal	Lima
	Barcos 36'	Report	Ávila 34'	Stadium: Alejandro Villanueva Stadium
Note: The match did not proceed to a penalty shoot-out.

6 July 2024 Friendly	Sport Boys (Peru)	0–1	(Peru) Alianza Lima	Callao
15:30 UTC−5		Report	De Santis (penalty missed) 6'; Rodríguez (red card) 46'; Serna 53'	Stadium: Estadio Miguel Grau
Note: Sebastián Rodríguez of Alianza Lima was sent off at halftime.

== Competitions ==
=== Overall record ===
Competition	First match	Last match	Starting round	Final position	Record							
Competition	First match	Last match	Starting round	Final position	Pld	W	D	L	GF	GA	GD	Win %
Liga 1 Apertura	28 January 2024	24 May 2024	Matchday 1	4th	17	11	0	6	32	16	+16	64.71
Liga 1 Clausura	13 July 2024	3 November 2024	Matchday 1	2nd	17	11	3	3	25	11	+14	64.71
Copa Libertadores	3 April 2024	29 May 2024	Group stage	Group stage	6	0	4	2	5	7	−2	0.00
Total					40	22	7	11	62	34	+28	55.00

Source: Competitions

=== Liga 1 ===
==== Apertura ====
===== Results summary =====
Overall								Home						Away					
Pld	W	D	L	GF	GA	GD	Pts	W	D	L	GF	GA	GD	W	D	L	GF	GA	GD
17	11	0	6	32	16	+16	33	7	0	2	20	7	+13	4	0	4	12	9	+3

===== Results by round =====
Round	1	2	3	4	5	6	7	8	9	10	11	12	13	14	15	16	17
Ground	H	A	H	A	H	A	H	A	H	A	H	H	A	H	A	H	A
Result	W	W	L	W	W	L	L	L	W	W	W	W	L	W	W	W	L
Position	4	3	7	4	4	4	5	7	6	3	3	3	4	4	4	4	4

A = Away; H = Home; W = Win; D = Draw; L = Loss

===== Matches =====
28 January 2024 1	Alianza Lima	2–1	Universidad Cesar Vallejo

4 February 2024 2	Alianza Atlético	0–2	Alianza Lima

10 February 2024 3	Alianza Lima	0–1	Universitario

18 February 2024 4	Unión Comercio	1–3	Alianza Lima

25 February 2024 5	Alianza Lima	5–1	Comerciantes Unidos

1 March 2024 6	AD Tarma	2–0	Alianza Lima

9 March 2024 7	Alianza Lima	1–2	Sporting Cristal

13 March 2024 8	Cienciano	2–1	Alianza Lima

28 March 2024 9	Alianza Lima	3–0	Los Chankas

6 April 2024 10	Mannucci	0–4	Alianza Lima

14 April 2024 11	Alianza Lima	2–0	Atlético Grau

18 April 2024 12	Alianza Lima	3–0	Sport Boys

28 April 2024 13	Melgar	1–0	Alianza Lima

3 May 2024 14	Alianza Lima	1–0	Universidad Técnica

11 May 2024 13	Sport Huancayo	0–2	Alianza Lima

19 May 2024 16	Alianza Lima	3–2	Deportivo Garcilaso

24 May 2024 17	Cusco	3–0	Alianza Lima

==== Clausura ====
===== Results summary =====
Overall								Home						Away					
Pld	W	D	L	GF	GA	GD	Pts	W	D	L	GF	GA	GD	W	D	L	GF	GA	GD
17	11	3	3	25	11	+14	36	5	2	1	11	4	+7	6	1	2	14	7	+7

==== Results by round ====
Round	1	2	3	4	5	6	7	8	9	10	11	12	13	14	15	16	17
Ground	A	H	A	H	A	H	A	H	A	H	A	A	H	A	H	A	H
Result	W	W	L	W	W	D	D	W	W	W	L	W	D	W	W	W	L
Position	4	2	5	3	1	1	2	1	1	1	2	2	2	2	2	2	2

A = Away; H = Home; W = Win; D = Draw; L = Loss

==== Matches ====
13 July 2024 1	Universidad Cesar Vallejo	2–3	Alianza Lima

20 July 2024 2	Alianza Lima	2–0	Alianza Atlético

26 July 2024 3	Universitario de Deportes	2–1	Alianza Lima

30 July 2024 4	Alianza Lima	1–0	Unión Comercio

3 August 2024 5	Comerciantes Unidos	1–3	Alianza Lima

10 August 2024 6	Alianza Lima	0–0	AD Tarma

17 August 2024 7	Sporting Cristal	0–0	Alianza Lima

20 August 2024 8	Alianza Lima	3–0	Cienciano

24 August 2024 9	Los Chankas	0–1	Alianza Lima

14 September 2024 10	Alianza Lima	1–0	Mannucci

18 September 2024 11	Atlético Grau	1–0	Alianza Lima

21 September 2024 12	Sport Boys	0–3	Alianza Lima

28 September 2024 13	Alianza Lima	1–1	Melgar

18 October 2024 14	Universidad Técnica	0–1	Alianza Lima

22 October 2024 15	Alianza Lima	2–1	Sport Huancayo

26 October 2024 16	Deportivo Garcilaso	1–2	Alianza Lima

3 November 2024 17	Alianza Lima	1–2	Cusco

=== Copa Libertadores ===
==== Group stage ====
The draw was held on March 18, 2024.

Group A

Pos	Team	Pld	W	D	L	GF	GA	GD	Pts	Qualification
1	(Brazil) Fluminense	6	4	2	0	9	5	+4	14	Advance to round of 16
2	(Chile) Colo-Colo	6	1	3	2	4	5	−1	6 (Note: Away goals scored: Colo-Colo 3, Cerro Porteño 2.)	Advance to round of 16
3	(Paraguay) Cerro Porteño	6	1	3	2	4	5	−1	6	Transfer to Copa Sudamericana
4	(Peru) Alianza Lima	6	0	4	2	5	7	−2	4	

Source: CONMEBOL
Rules for classification: 1) Points; 2) Goal difference; 3) Goals scored; 4) Away goals scored; 5) CONMEBOL ranking.
Notes:

3 April 2024 1	Alianza Lima (Peru)	1–1	(Brazil) Fluminense	Lima
19:30 UTC−5	Kevin Serna 35'		Marquinhos 72'	Stadium: Alejandro Villanueva Stadium; Attendance: 19,779; Referee: Andrés Matonte (Uruguay)

10 April 2024 2	Cerro Porteño (Paraguay)	1–0	(Peru) Alianza Lima	Asunción, Paraguay
18:00 UTC−4	Carrizo 90+6'			Stadium: Estadio General Pablo Rojas; Attendance: 17,624; Referee: Wilmar Roldán (Colombia)

23 April 2024 3	Colo-Colo (Chile)	0–0	(Peru) Alianza Lima	Macul, Chile
20:30 UTC−4				Stadium: Estadio Monumental David Arellano; Attendance: 39,886; Referee: Dario Herrera (Argentina)

8 May 2024 4	Alianza Lima (Peru)	1–1	(Paraguay) Cerro Porteño	Lima
19:00 UTC−5	Barcos 80'		Iturbe 26'	Stadium: Alejandro Villanueva Stadium; Attendance: 21,681; Referee: Jesús Valenzuela (Venezuela)

15 May 2024 5	Alianza Lima (Peru)	1–1	(Chile) Colo-Colo	Lima
19:00 UTC−4	Barcos 42'		Vidal 78'	Stadium: Alejandro Villanueva Stadium; Attendance: 25,949; Referee: Yael Falcón Pérez

29 May 2024 6	Fluminense (Brazil)	3–2	(Peru) Alianza Lima	Rio de Janeiro, Brazil
21:30 UTC−4	Keno 47'; Marcelo 52'; John Kennedy 81'		Adrián Arregui 7'; Kevin Serna 50'	Stadium: Maracanã; Attendance: 38,404; Referee: Esteban Ostojich (Uruguay)

== Statistics ==
=== Goalscorers ===
#	Pos	Player	Apertura	Clausura	Copa Libertadores	Total
1	FW	(Argentina) Hernán Barcos	7	7	2	16
2	MF	(Argentina) Catriel Cabellos	3	3	0	6
3	FW	(Panama) Cecilio Waterman	5	0	0	5
4	FW	(Peru) Paolo Guerrero	0	4	0	4
4	FW	(Syria) Pablo Sabbag	0	4	0	4
6	DF	(Argentina) Juan Pablo Freytes	3	0	0	3
6	FW	(Colombia) Kevin Serna	1	0	2	3
6	DF	(Peru) Carlos Zambrano	2	1	0	3
9	MF	(Argentina) Adrián Arregui	1	0	1	2
9	MF	(Peru) Jhamir D'Arrigo	1	1	0	2
9	DF	(Peru) Renzo Garcés	1	1	0	2
9	MF	(Uruguay) Sebastián Rodríguez	2	0	0	2
13	MF	(Uruguay) Gabriel Costa	1	0	0	1
13	MF	(Peru) Aldair Fuentes	1	0	0	1
13	MF	(Peru) Cristian Neira	1	0	0	1
13	DF	(Peru) Erick Noriega	1	0	0	1
13	DF	(Panama) Jiovany Ramos	1	0	0	1
