= Fernando Gago =

Argentine footballer and manager

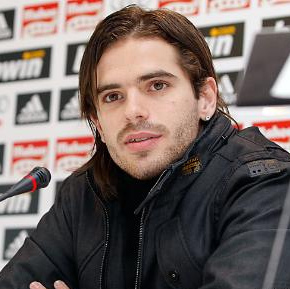
- Gago with Real Madrid in 2010

Personal information
- Full name: Fernando Rubén Gago
- Date of birth: 10 April 1986 (age 40)
- Place of birth: Ciudadela, Argentina
- Height: 1.78 m (5 ft 10 in)
- Position: Defensive midfielder

Team information
- Current team: Universidad de Chile (head coach)

Youth career
- 1991–2004: Boca Juniors

Senior career*
Years	Team	Apps	(Gls)
2004–2006	Boca Juniors	61	(1)
2007–2012	Real Madrid	92	(1)
2011–2012	→ Roma (loan)	30	(1)
2012–2013	Valencia	13	(0)
2013	→ Vélez Sársfield (loan)	3	(0)
2013–2019	Boca Juniors	85	(5)
2019–2020	Vélez Sarsfield	14	(0)
Total		298	(8)

International career
2003	Argentina U17	5	(0)
2005	Argentina U20	15	(0)
2008	Argentina U23	9	(0)
2007–2017	Argentina	61	(0)

Managerial career
- 2021: Aldosivi
- 2021–2023: Racing Club
- 2024: Guadalajara
- 2024–2025: Boca Juniors
- 2025: Necaxa
- 2026–: Universidad de Chile
Medal record
Men's football
Representing Argentina
Olympic Games
Gold medal – first place	2008 Beijing	Team
FIFA U-20 World Cup
Winner	2005 Netherlands
FIFA World Cup
Runner-up	2014 Brazil
Copa América
Runner-up	2015 Chile
Runner-up	2007 Venezuela
FIFA U-17 World Cup
Bronze medal – third place	2003 Finland
- * Club domestic league appearances and goals

Fernando Rubén Gago (Spanish pronunciation: [feɾˈnando ˈɣaɣo]; born 10 April 1986) is an Argentine football manager and former player. He is the manager of Universidad de Chile.

During his 16-year club career, limited by multiple serious injuries, Gago played as a defensive midfielder and deep-lying playmaker for Boca Juniors, Real Madrid, Roma, Valencia and Vélez Sarsfield.

A full international from 2007 to 2017, Gago represented Argentina at the 2014 FIFA World Cup and at the Copa América in 2007, 2011 and 2015, as well as winning a gold medal at the 2008 Olympics.

As a manager, he led Aldosivi, Racing Club and Boca Juniors in the Argentine Primera División, winning two super cup honours.

== Club career ==
=== Boca Juniors ===
Born in Ciudadela, Greater Buenos Aires, Gago came from the youth divisions of Boca Juniors. He had his professional debut with Boca in the 1–0 victory over Quilmes on 5 December 2004, in the Torneo Apertura. On 1 October 2006, he scored the first professional goal of his career and the only one of his initial Boca spell in a 3–2 win over Vélez Sarsfield at La Bombonera.

=== Real Madrid ===
On 21 December 2006, Real Madrid confirmed the signing of Gago on a 6 1/2-year contract for a fee of €20 million, effective from the turn of the calendar year. His signing came shortly after that of fellow Argentine youngster Gonzalo Higuaín from River Plate, and teenage Brazilian full-back Marcelo.

He made his debut on 7 January 2007 in a 2–0 loss at Deportivo de La Coruña in La Liga, partnering Emerson in defensive midfield at the expense of Mahamadou Diarra and being substituted for forward Ronaldo after 58 minutes; local sports daily Diario AS commented that he barely influenced the game. On 20 May, away to Recreativo de Huelva in the 35th match, he gave away a penalty but in added time assisted Roberto Carlos for the 3–2 winner as Real Madrid maintained their league challenge, eventually winning the league.

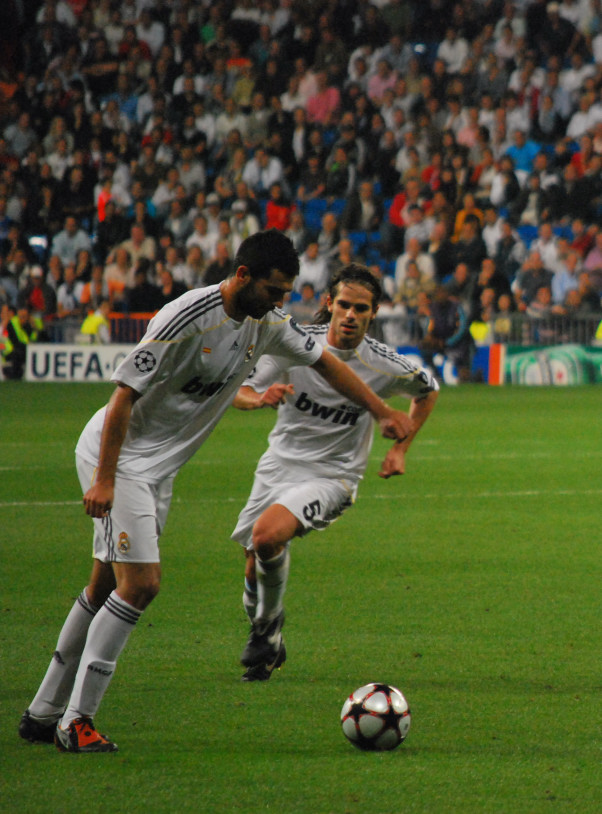
Gago (right) playing for Real Madrid in September 2009

In August 2008, Gago injured his left knee ligaments in a friendly against Peñarol, and missed the start of the new season. He returned on 17 September for a UEFA Champions League game against FC BATE Borisov, leaving the game after 36 minutes due to his left femural biceps and being sidelined for another month. On 7 December, he scored his only goal of his 121 Real Madrid games, equalising in a 4–3 loss to Sevilla at the Santiago Bernabéu Stadium; on 31 January 2009 he was given his only red card for the club in a 2–0 win away to Numancia.

Before the 2009–10 season, Gago ceded his number 8 shirt to new signing Kaká to take the number 5 vacated by Fabio Cannavaro's return to Juventus; he had coveted the number as it had been worn by Zinedine Zidane before. Gago did not play any games for three months for Real Madrid around the turn of 2009 to 2010. Under new Madrid manager José Mourinho from 2010, Gago struggled to receive playing time due to both a lengthy injury spell and Mourinho's preference for the tandem of Xabi Alonso and Sami Khedira in defensive midfield.

=== Loan to Roma ===
On 31 August 2011, Gago moved on loan to Italian Serie A side Roma, with a view to a permanent move, until the end of the 2011–12 season. His number 5 jersey was conferred to the recently signed Nuri Şahin, formerly of Borussia Dortmund. Upon arriving in the Italian capital, he refuted suggestions that he was too similar to his new teammate Daniele De Rossi, by saying that the pair had differences that would work well together.

Gago made his debut on 11 September in a 2–1 home loss to Cagliari, as a substitute for Aleandro Rosi for the last 15 minutes. He scored his only goal for Roma against Lecce on 20 November, a long-range strike in a 2–1 victory; two weeks later he was sent off in a 3–0 defeat at Fiorentina.

Compared to his previous seasons at Real Madrid, Gago's one year at Roma was untroubled by injury. After a 7th-placed finish, the Giallorossi were unable to meet Madrid's offer of €7 million to make his deal permanent.

=== Valencia and Vélez Sarsfield loan ===
On 19 July 2012, shortly after returning from loan to Real Madrid, Valencia purchased Gago for a reported fee in the region of €3.5 million, on a four-year deal. He debuted on 19 August, playing the full 90 minutes in a 1–1 away draw against his previous club.

In January 2013, Vélez Sársfield signed Gago on a six-month loan without a buying option. He had previously rejected offers from Russia and Turkey. His brief spell at El Fortín was marred by further muscle and knee problems. In his seven games, he managed one goal, concluding a 3–0 home win over Chile's Deportes Iquique in the second stage of the 2013 Copa Libertadores on 20 February.

=== Return to Boca Juniors ===
Boca Juniors bought 50% of Gago's playing rights from Valencia for a fee of €1.7 million in July 2013. He signed a three-year deal in the aim of making the Argentina squad for the 2014 FIFA World Cup. On 13 September 2015 in the Superclásico away to River Plate, he left the game after 24 seconds due to a left Achilles tendon injury; he returned to action in late January.

On 24 April 2016, Gago suffered the same injury after 44 minutes at home to River Plate, returning at the end of November. In March 2017, his contract was extended for three more years. He suffered another injury on international duty that October, and did not recover until May 2018.

Boca Juniors reached the 2018 Copa Libertadores Finals against rivals River, and the second leg had to be played at Gago's former club ground in Madrid due to hooliganism. He came on in the 89th minute for captain Pablo Pérez just before the game went to extra time, and suffered another Achilles injury in the 116th minute. Having used all four substitutes and had Wilmar Barrios sent off, Boca fell to a 3–1 loss with nine men.

=== Return to Vélez Sarsfield ===
Ahead of the 2019–20 season, Gago was released by Boca and signed a one-year contract with Vélez Sarsfield. His new manager was his former Real Madrid and international teammate, Gabriel Heinze. He made his comeback after nine months on 24 August 2019 in a 3–1 home win over Newell's Old Boys. In November 2020, Gago announced his retirement from professional football at the age of 34.

== International career ==
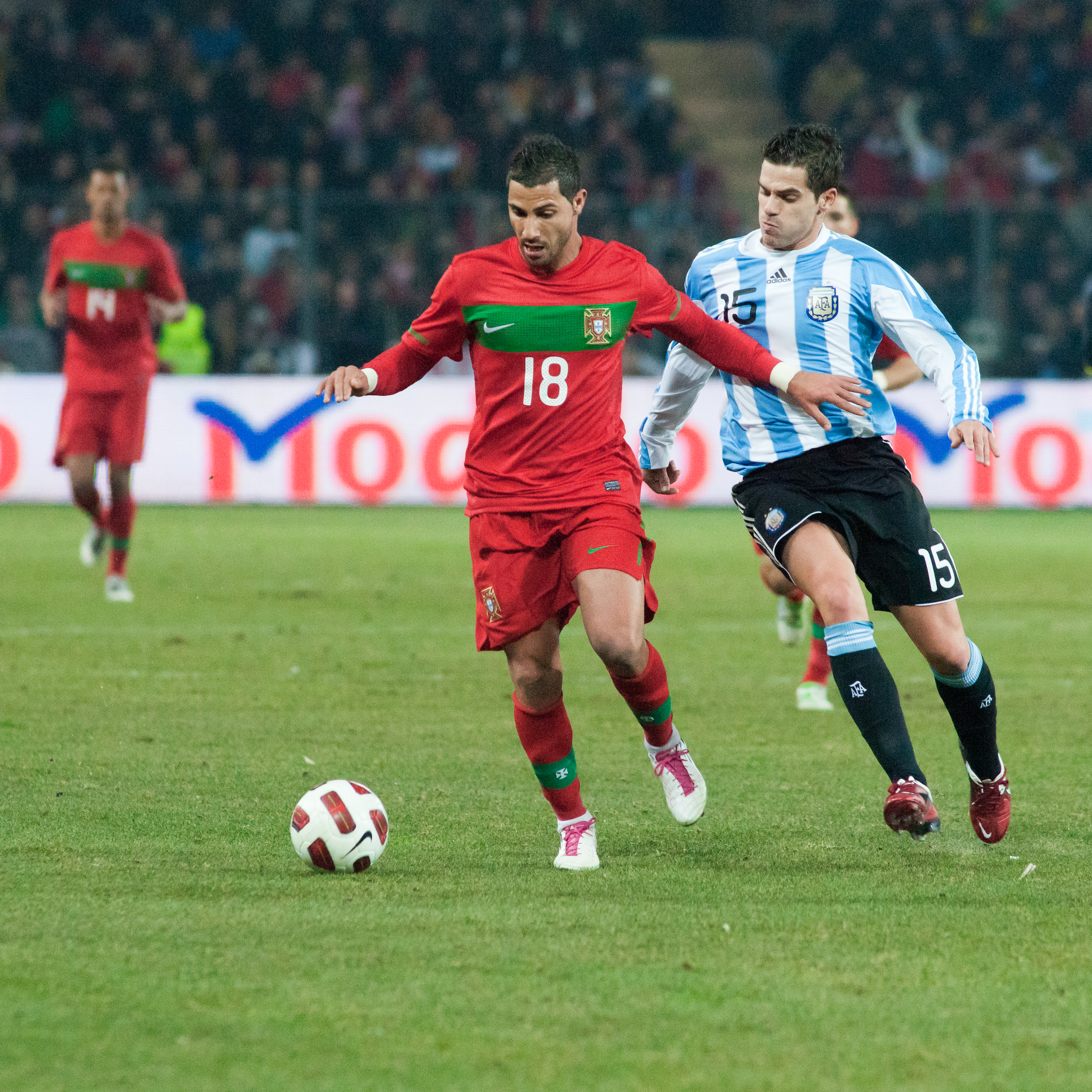
Gago challenging for the ball against Ricardo Quaresma of Portugal in a 2011 friendly

Gago was part of the under-20 squad which won the 2005 FIFA World Youth Championship. He made his senior international debut on 7 February 2007 in a 1–0 friendly win away to France. He played in the 2007 Copa América, and was part of the team which won the gold medal at the 2008 Olympics.

Gago was one of over 100 players used by Diego Maradona in 2010 FIFA World Cup qualification, but also one of the highest-profile absentees for the final tournament in South Africa. He returned to the squad for the 2011 Copa América.

Gago was named in Argentina's 23-man squad for the 2014 FIFA World Cup. He made his World Cup debut in Argentina's 2–1 defeat of Bosnia and Herzegovina at the Estádio do Maracanã, coming on as a half-time substitute for Hugo Campagnaro. He was named in the starting line-up for the team's second match, a 1–0 win over Iran in Belo Horizonte, and remained a starter until being replaced by Lucas Biglia in the quarter-finals. Gago replaced Enzo Pérez after 86 minutes of the final, which Argentina lost 0–1 to Germany after extra time.

On 5 October 2017, Gago returned to the national team against Peru. In his final international match, he suffered cruciate ligament injuries to his right knee.

== Style of play ==
Gago relished operating in a holding role at Boca Juniors, functioning as a deep-lying playmaker in front of the defence, due to his intelligence and ability to dictate play in midfield with his passing; he has also played in a similar role with the Argentina national team and other clubs. Upon arriving in Europe in 2006, Gago drew comparisons to compatriot and former Real Madrid man Fernando Redondo, due to his ability to build up play and break down the oppositions' attacks, thus enabling him to contribute both offensively and defensively. His Real Madrid profile described Gago as a "very dynamic footballer who predicates his game on ball movement". He is also capable of reaching the opponent's box, possesses a tremendous vision for the game, [he] can cover much ground and knows how to protect the ball.

== Managerial career ==
=== Aldosivi ===
On 17 January 2021, Gago was appointed manager of Argentine Primera División side Aldosivi. He lost 2–1 at home to Godoy Cruz on his debut on 14 February. He resigned on 27 September after a run of six consecutive defeats left the team in 23rd.

=== Racing Club ===
Gago returned to work on 21 October 2021, signing with Racing Club until the end of the following year. Two days later, he lost 2–1 on his debut at Rosario Central.

In June 2022, despite eliminations from the Copa Argentina and Copa Sudamericana, Gago's contract was renewed for another year. The team ended the domestic season as runners-up to Boca, who started the final day one point ahead as the teams drew their respective games; Racing had a penalty that would have won them the title, but River Plate's Franco Armani saved from Jonathan Galván. On 6 November, his team won 2–1 against Boca in the Trofeo de Campeones de la Liga Profesional with an extra-time goal from Carlos Alcaraz; the game had 11 red cards including for his celebration and opposing manager, former Boca Juniors teammate, Hugo Ibarra.

In the 2022 Supercopa Internacional, played the following 20 January in Abu Dhabi, Gago's team again beat Boca by the same score via a penalty from Gonzalo Piovi in the seventh minute of added time. Racing fell to the same side in the quarter-finals of the 2023 Copa Libertadores on penalties, and days later were defeated 5–3 at home by Club Atlético Huracán in the last 16 of the Copa Argentina. On 30 September 2023, following a 2–0 home defeat to Independiente in the Avellaneda derby, he resigned under pressure from the supporters. His team won 53 games, tied 30 games, lost 26 games, scored 170 goals and conceded 119 goals during his 109-game tenure with Racing Avellaneda.

=== Guadalajara ===
On 20 December 2023, Mexican club Guadalajara announced Gago as their new head coach for the Clausura 2024 tournament. On 10 October 2024, Gago terminated his contract with Guadalajara by covering the expenses of his exit clause. His team won 17 games, tied 11 games, lost 10 games, scored 53 goals and conceded 39 goals during his 38-game tenure with Chivas Guadalajara.

=== Boca Juniors ===
On 14 October 2024, Boca Juniors announced Gago as their new head coach. On 29 April 2025, Gago was relieved of his duties following a defeat in the Superclásico. His team won 17 games, tied 6 games, lost 7 games, scored 44 goals and conceded 23 goals during his 30-game tenure with Boca Juniors.

=== Necaxa ===
On 12 June 2025, Gago returned to Mexico to take up the position of head coach at Necaxa. He was dismissed on 26 November.

=== Universidad de Chile ===
On 23 March 2026, Gago became the head coach of Universidad de Chile.

== Personal life ==
Gago, Sergio Agüero and Lionel Messi had all been teammates as children back in Argentina. Together, the three of them won the 2005 FIFA World Youth Championship in the Netherlands.

Gago is a literature and art enthusiast. The first thing he did after landing in Spain was visit the Museo del Prado. He earned the nickname "El Pintita" (roughly meaning "the little one trying to look good" in English) ever since Ramón Maddoni scolded him for playing with his hair. Also, his Boca Juniors teammates would call him so because his youth squad coach would scold him, "Stop trying to look good and run!"

Gago was married to professional tennis player Gisela Dulko with whom he has two sons and a daughter. The couple separated in 2021, after he had an affair with one of her friends.

In September 2005, Gago's father died of a stroke while Gago was playing for Boca Juniors against Racing Club. In February 2021, his brother died in the same way while Gago was managing Aldosivi against the same club.

On 19 June 2026, Gago was rushed to Clínica Alemana de Santiago with a myocardial infarction and had an emergency heart surgery.

== Career statistics ==
=== Club ===
Appearances and goals by club, season and competition
Club	Season	League			Cup		Continental		Other		Total	
Club	Season	Division	Apps	Goals	Apps	Goals	Apps	Goals	Apps	Goals	Apps	Goals
Boca Juniors	2004–05	Argentine Primera División	7	0	—		7	0	2	0	16	0
Boca Juniors	2005–06	Argentine Primera División	34	0	—		1	0	2	0	37	0
Boca Juniors	2006–07	Argentine Primera División	20	1	—		—		1	0	21	1
Boca Juniors	Total		61	1	—		8	0	5	0	74	1
Real Madrid	2006–07	La Liga	13	0	2	0	2	0	—		17	0
Real Madrid	2007–08	La Liga	31	0	4	0	6	0	1	0	42	0
Real Madrid	2008–09	La Liga	26	1	1	0	6	0	0	0	33	1
Real Madrid	2009–10	La Liga	18	0	2	0	2	0	—		22	0
Real Madrid	2010–11	La Liga	4	0	3	0	0	0	—		7	0
Real Madrid	Total		92	1	12	0	16	0	1	0	121	1
Roma (loan)	2011–12	Serie A	30	1	2	0	0	0	—		32	1
Valencia	2012–13	La Liga	13	0	1	0	4	0	—		18	0
Vélez Sársfield (loan)	2012–13	Argentine Primera División	3	0	0	0	4	1	—		7	1
Boca Juniors	2013–14	Argentine Primera División	20	0	0	0	0	0	—		20	0
Boca Juniors	2014	Argentine Primera División	10	1	0	0	6	0	—		16	1
Boca Juniors	2015	Argentine Primera División	14	2	3	1	6	0	—		23	3
Boca Juniors	2016	Argentine Primera División	11	0	0	0	6	1	1	0	18	1
Boca Juniors	2016–17	Argentine Primera División	16	2	0	0	0	0	—		16	2
Boca Juniors	2017–18	Argentine Primera División	6	0	6	1	0	0	—		12	1
Boca Juniors	2018–19	Argentine Primera División	8	0	1	0	5	0	—		14	0
Boca Juniors	Total		85	5	10	2	23	1	1	0	119	8
Vélez Sársfield	2019–20	Argentine Primera División	13	0	0	0	2	0	1	0	16	0
Vélez Sársfield	2020–21	Argentine Primera División	1	0	—		—		—		1	0
Vélez Sársfield	Total		14	0	0	0	2	0	1	0	17	0
Boca Juniors total			146	6	10	2	31	1	6	0	193	9
Vélez Sársfield total			17	0	0	0	6	1	1	0	24	1
Career total			298	8	25	2	57	2	8	0	388	12

=== International ===
Appearances and goals by national team and year
National team	Year	Apps	Goals
Argentina	2007	13	0
Argentina	2008	7	0
Argentina	2009	7	0
Argentina	2010	1	0
Argentina	2011	7	0
Argentina	2012	8	0
Argentina	2013	3	0
Argentina	2014	11	0
Argentina	2015	3	0
Argentina	2016	0	0
Argentina	2017	1	0
Total		61	0

== Managerial statistics ==
As of 8 November 2026

Managerial record by team and tenure
Team	Nat	From	To	Record							
Team	Nat	From	To	G	W	D	L	GF	GA	GD	Win %
Aldosivi	(Argentina)	17 January 2021	25 September 2021	26	7	3	16	30	45	−15	26.92
Racing Club	(Argentina)	21 October 2021	30 September 2023	109	53	30	26	170	119	+51	48.62
Guadalajara	(Mexico)	20 December 2023	10 October 2024	38	17	11	10	53	39	+14	44.74
Boca Juniors	(Argentina)	14 October 2024	29 April 2025	30	17	6	7	44	23	+21	56.67
Necaxa	(Mexico)	12 June 2025	26 November 2025	20	5	6	9	30	40	−10	25.00
Universidad de Chile	(Chile)	20 March 2026	present	32	19	4	9	61	28	+33	59.38
Total				255	118	60	77	388	294	+94	46.27

== Honours ==
=== Player ===
Boca Juniors

- Argentine Primera División: 2005 Apertura, 2006 Clausura, 2015, 2016–17, 2017–18
- Copa Sudamericana: 2005
- Recopa Sudamericana: 2005, 2006
- Copa Argentina: 2015

Real Madrid

- La Liga: 2006–07, 2007–08
- Copa del Rey: 2010–11
- Supercopa de España: 2008

Vélez Sarsfield

- Argentine Primera División: 2012–13

Argentina U20

- FIFA U-20 World Cup: 2005

Argentina Olympic

- Summer Olympics: 2008

Argentina

- FIFA World Cup runner-up: 2014
- Copa América runner-up: 2007, 2015

Individual

- South American Team of the Year: 2005, 2006

=== Manager ===
Racing Club

- Trofeo de Campeones de la Liga Profesional: 2022
- Supercopa Internacional: 2022

Individual

- The Best of America Best Argentine Primera División Manager: 2022
