= Jonathan Gómez (Argentine footballer) =

Argentine footballer

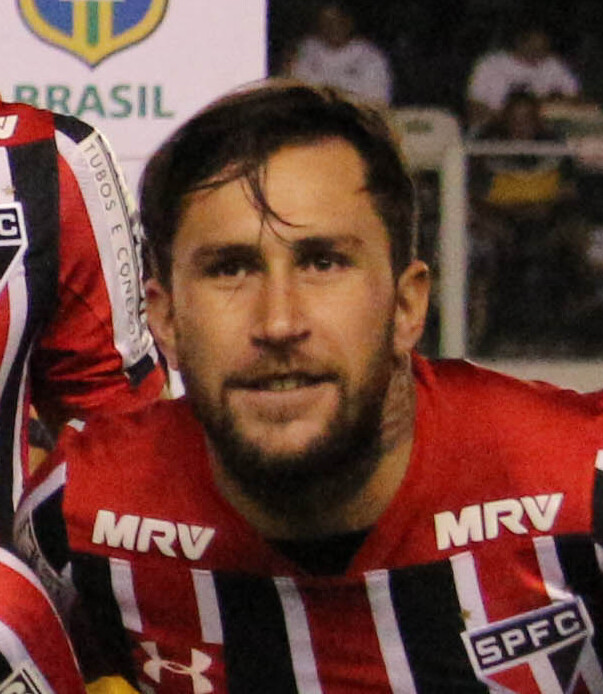
- Gómez with São Paulo in 2017

Personal information
- Full name: Jonathan David Gómez Espinoza
- Date of birth: 21 December 1989 (age 36)
- Place of birth: Capitán Bermúdez, Argentina
- Height: 1.71 m (5 ft 7 1/2 in)
- Position: Attacking midfielder

Youth career
- Rosario Central

Senior career*
Years	Team	Apps	(Gls)
2008–2010	Rosario Central	63	(1)
2010–2015	Banfield	45	(4)
2012–2013	→ Murcia (loan)	20	(0)
2013–2014	→ Arsenal de Sarandí (loan)	11	(1)
2014	→ Atlético Tucumán (loan)	12	(0)
2015	Deportivo Pasto	34	(9)
2016–2017	Santa Fe	55	(12)
2017–2020	São Paulo	15	(0)
2018	→ Al-Fayha (loan)	18	(2)
2019	→ CSA (loan)	26	(5)
2020–2021	Sport Recife	28	(1)
2021–2022	Argentinos Juniors	28	(1)
2022–2024	Racing Club	75	(5)
2024–2025	Rosario Central	30	(0)
2025–2026	Sarmiento	24	(1)
- * Club domestic league appearances and goals as of 17:51, 2 June 2026 (UTC)

Jonathan David Gómez Espinoza (Note: In this Spanish name, the first or paternal surname is Gómez and the second or maternal family name is Espinoza.) (born 21 December 1989) is an Argentine professional footballer who plays as an attacking midfielder.

== Club career ==
Gómez emerged from the Rosario Central youth team to make his full debut for the club on 22 August 2008 aged 18 in a 0–1 home defeat to Colón de Santa Fe. He soon established himself as a regular first-team player and in 2009 he was allocated the coveted number 10 squad number. He scored his first goal for the club in a 1–1 home draw with Gimnasia y Esgrima de La Plata on 9 October 2009.

=== Santa Fe ===
In December 2015 he arrives to Independiente Santa Fe after signing a 3-year contract.

=== São Paulo ===
On 21 June 2017 Gómez signed with Brazilian side São Paulo a three-year deal.

==== CSA (loan) ====
On 6 June 2019 CSA signed Gómez, on loan from São Paulo, until December 2019.

== Honours ==
Título	Club	País	Año
Copa Argentina	Arsenal	Argentina	2013
Categoría Primera A	Santa Fe	Colombia	Finalización 2016
Superliga Colombiana	Santa Fe	Colombia	2017
Trofeo de Campeones	Racing Club	Argentina	2022
Supercopa Internacional	Racing Club	Argentina	2023
