= Matías Tagliamonte =

Argentine professional footballer

Personal information
- Full name: Matías Nicolás Tagliamonte
- Date of birth: 19 February 1998 (age 28)
- Place of birth: Rafaela, Argentina
- Height: 1.95 m (6 ft 5 in)
- Position: Goalkeeper

Team information
- Current team: Racing Club
- Number: 30

Youth career
- Atlético de Rafaela

Senior career*
Years	Team	Apps	(Gls)
2017–2021	Atlético de Rafaela	3	(0)
2021	→ Racing Club (loan)	1	(0)
2022–	Racing Club	8	(0)
2024	→ Tigre (loan)	13	(0)
2024	→ Gimnasia (M) (loan)	23	(0)
2025	→ Unión Santa Fe (loan)	19	(0)
- * Club domestic league appearances and goals as of 18:14, 8 November 2026 (UTC)

Matías Nicolás Tagliamonte (born 19 February 1998) is an Argentine professional footballer who plays as a goalkeeper for Racing Club.

== Club career ==
Tagliamonte came through the youth ranks at local team Atlético de Rafaela. He was initially called up to the first-team in June 2017 and was an unused substitute for a Copa Argentina win over Almagro on 7 June and on 25 June in the Primera División against Sarmiento; which came on the final day of the 2016–17 campaign, as both sides were relegated. He was an unused sub twenty more times across the next three seasons in league and cup. Tagliamonte made his senior debut on 7 October 2019 during a 1–1 draw away to Santamarina, which preceded further appearances versus Instituto and San Martín later that month.

After no more matches for Atlético de Rafaela over the next sixteen months, partly due to a shoulder injury, Tagliamonte departed on loan in February 2021 to Primera División side Racing Club until the end of the year with a purchase option. With Gabriel Arias and Gastón Gómez unavailable after testing positive for COVID-19, Tagliamonte made his debut for Racing on 17 March during a Copa Argentina round of sixty-four victory over third tier team Sportivo Belgrano. Racing made use of the purchase option at the end of the year.

== International career ==
In 2015, Tagliamonte was selected on the preliminary squad list for the South American U-17 Championship in Paraguay; though didn't make the final cut.

== Honours ==
Racing Club

- Trofeo de Campeones de la Liga Profesional: 2022

== Career statistics ==
As of 18 March 2021.

Appearances and goals by club, season and competition
Club	Season	League			Cup		League Cup		Continental		Other		Total	
Club	Season	Division	Apps	Goals	Apps	Goals	Apps	Goals	Apps	Goals	Apps	Goals	Apps	Goals
Atlético de Rafaela	2016–17	Primera División	0	0	0	0	—		—		0	0	0	0
Atlético de Rafaela	2017–18	Primera Nacional	0	0	0	0	—		—		0	0	0	0
Atlético de Rafaela	2018–19	Primera Nacional	0	0	0	0	—		—		0	0	0	0
Atlético de Rafaela	2019–20	Primera Nacional	3	0	0	0	—		—		0	0	3	0
Atlético de Rafaela	2020	Primera Nacional	0	0	0	0	—		—		0	0	0	0
Atlético de Rafaela	2021	Primera Nacional	0	0	0	0	—		—		0	0	0	0
Atlético de Rafaela	Total		3	0	0	0	—		—		0	0	3	0
Racing Club (loan)	2021 (Note: Soccerway counts Copa de la Liga Profesional appearances as league appearances.)	Primera División	0	0	1	0	—		0	0	0	0	1	0
Career total			3	0	1	0	—		0	0	0	0	4	0
