= Fernando Prado =

Uruguayan footballer (born 2001)

Personal information
- Full name: Fernando Andrés Prado Avelino
- Date of birth: 21 March 2001 (age 25)
- Place of birth: Carmelo, Uruguay
- Height: 1.70 m (5 ft 7 in)
- Positions: Left-back; centre-back

Team information
- Current team: Imbabura S.C.
- Number: 21

Youth career
- Racing Club

Senior career*
| Years | Team | Apps | (Gls) |
| 2020– | Racing Club | 22 | (0) |
| 2024– | → Imbabura S.C. (Loan) | 1 | (0) |
- * Club domestic league appearances and goals as of 18:08, 21 April 2022 (UTC)

Fernando Andrés Prado Avelino (born 21 March 2001) is a Uruguayan professional footballer who plays as a left-back or centre-back for Imbabura on loan from Racing Club.

== Career ==
Born in Uruguay, Prado ended up in the youth system of Racing Club in Argentina. He made the jump into their first-team squad in November 2020. Prado made his senior debut in the Copa de la Liga Profesional on 19 November, featuring for the full duration of a loss away to Atlético Tucumán; compatriot Fabricio Domínguez also debuted for the club that day.

== Honours ==
Racing Club

- Trofeo de Campeones de la Liga Profesional: 2022

== Career statistics ==
As of 20 November 2020.

Appearances and goals by club, season and competition
| Club | Season | League | | | Cup | | League Cup | | Continental | | Other | | Total | |
| Club | Season | Division | Apps | Goals | Apps | Goals | Apps | Goals | Apps | Goals | Apps | Goals | Apps | Goals |
|---|---|---|---|---|---|---|---|---|---|---|---|---|---|---|
| Racing Club | 2020–21 (Note: Soccerway counts Copa de la Liga Profesional appearances as league appearances.) | Primera División | 1 | 0 | 0 | 0 | 0 | 0 | 0 | 0 | 0 | 0 | 1 | 0 |
| Career total | | | 1 | 0 | 0 | 0 | 0 | 0 | 0 | 0 | 0 | 0 | 1 | 0 |
