= Estadio Único de Villa Mercedes =

Football stadium in Villa Mercedes, Argentina

- La Pedrera

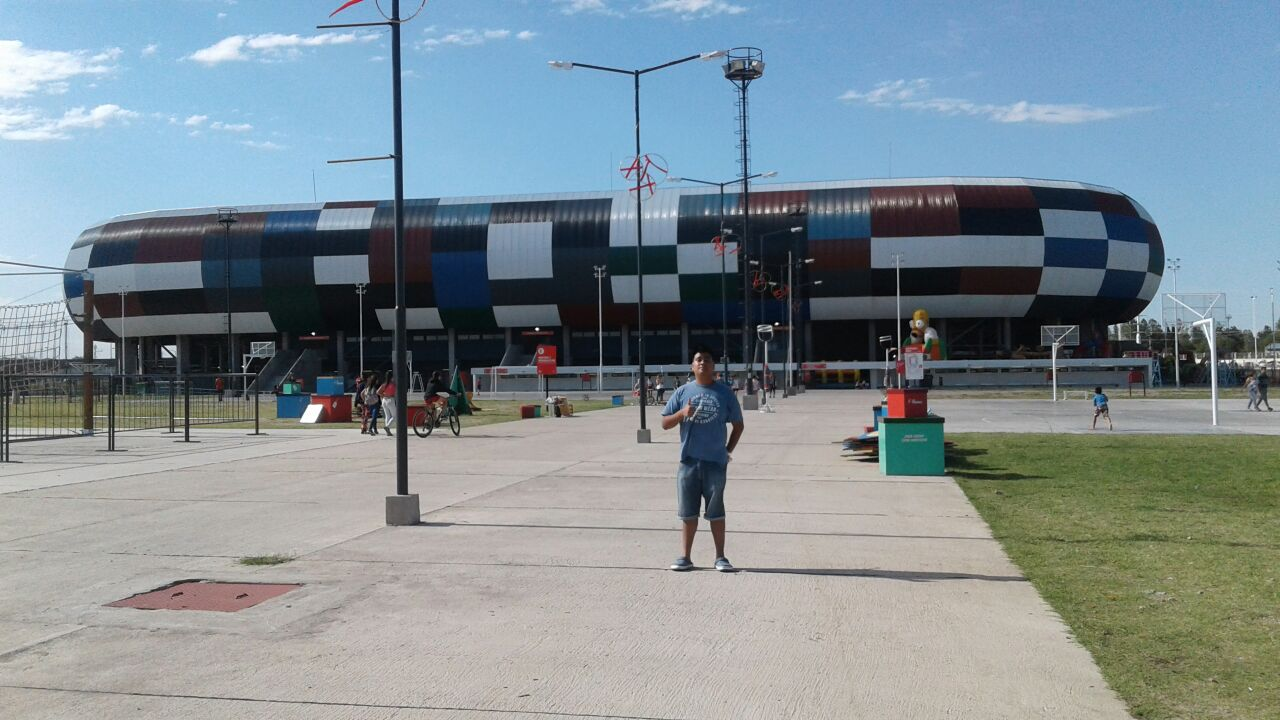
- View of the stadium in 2018
- Interactive map of Estadio Único de Villa Mercedes
- Address: Villa Mercedes, San Luis; Argentina
- Coordinates: 33.6851°S 65.4953°W
- Owner: Government of San Luis
- Capacity: 28,000
- Surface: Grass
- Scoreboard: LED display

Construction
- Opened: 8 July 2017; 9 years ago

Website
- lapedrera.sanluis.gov.ar

The Estadio Único de Villa Mercedes, also known as Estadio La Pedrera, is a football stadium located in Villa Mercedes, San Luis Province, Argentina. It was inaugurated on 8 July 2017 with a friendly match between the Friends of Martín Palermo and Friends of Fernando Cavenaghi combined teams. It has roofed grandstands and a parking lot. The stadium has a capacity of 28,000 spectators.

== Overview ==
The stadium is located on Parque La Pedrera, a park built by the Government of San Luis then led by Alberto Rodríguez Saá. Construction works were carried out by local companies Lumma, Rovella-Carranza, Green SA and Alquimaq. Apart from the stadium, autodrome (named "Carlos Bassi" (Note: José Carlos Bassi (1948–2014) was a local race driver whose career extended from the 1970s to early 1991. He is regarded as the most notable driver of the province.)) was also built on the park. All at a total cost of AR$1,571,201,563. Estadio Único's facilities include an auxiliary field. The stadium occupies 20 of 66 ha. of the park.

The 2022 Trofeo de Campeones final between Boca Juniors and Racing Club de Avellaneda was held in Estadio Único.

=== Concerts ===
The Estadio Único has hosted some concerts since its inauguration in 2017, such as:

Date	Artist	Ref.
Sep 2017	Maluma	
Apr 2018	La Renga	
Jul 2019	Bersuit Vergarabat	
Oct 2022	Tini Stoessel	
