= Gabriel Arias (footballer) =

Argentine-born Chilean footballer (born 1987)

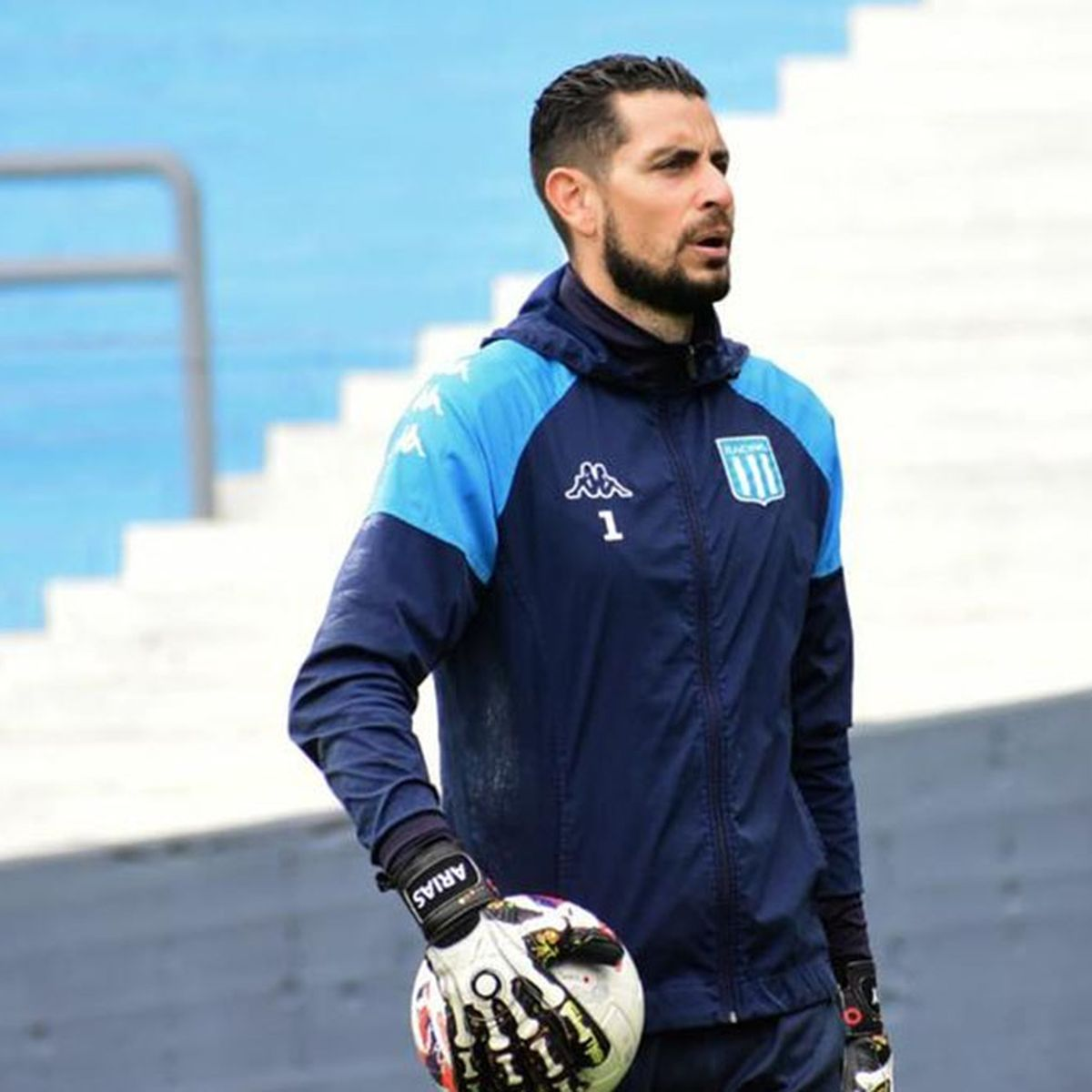
- Arias with Racing Club in 2021

Personal information
- Full name: Gabriel Arias Arroyo
- Date of birth: 13 September 1987 (age 39)
- Place of birth: Neuquén, Argentina
- Height: 1.88 m (6 ft 2 in)
- Position: Goalkeeper

Team information
- Current team: Newell's Old Boys
- Number: 21

Youth career
- 2002–2008: Independiente
- 2008–2009: Olimpo

Senior career*
Years	Team	Apps	(Gls)
2009–2012	Olimpo	1	(0)
2012–2018	Defensa y Justicia	85	(0)
2018	→ La Calera (loan)	14	(0)
2018–2026	Racing	190	(0)
2026–	Newell's	7	(0)

International career^{‡}
2018–2024	Chile	19	(0)
- * Club domestic league appearances and goals as of 17:30, 8 May 2026 (UTC) ‡ National team caps and goals as of 10 September 2024

Gabriel Arias Arroyo (born 13 September 1987) is a professional footballer who plays as a goalkeeper for Argentine Primera División club Newell's Old Boys. Born and raised in Argentina, he played for the Chile national team.

== Club career ==
Arias came to the Independiente youth system at the age of 14 from his hometown, Neuquén. He switched to Olimpo before joining Defensa y Justicia in 2012. In 2018, he was loaned out to Chilean club Unión La Calera.

In July 2018, Arias returned to Argentina and signed with Racing Club de Avellaneda. On 24 July 2024, he reached two hundred matches with them.

On 2 January 2026, Arias signed with Newell's Old Boys.

== International career ==
Arias qualifies to play for Chile through his maternal grandparents. In 2018, he was called up for the first time. He made his debut on 4 June 2018, in a friendly match against Serbia, where he played the whole match and kept a clean sheet on a 1–0 victory.

Being one of the key players for Racing to win the 2018–19 Argentine league, Arias was asked by media if he would play for the Argentina national team, considering that he had played for Chile in friendly matches only. However, he maintained his position of representing Chile internationally.

== Personal life ==
Arias naturalized Chilean by descent since his maternal grandparents are Chilean.

Arias dropped out of school at the age of 14, when he moved to Buenos Aires from Neuquén. In July 2024, he graduated from high school.

== Career statistics ==
=== International ===
As of match played 10 September 2024

Appearances and goals by national team and year
National team	Year	Apps	Goals
Chile	2018	3	0
Chile	2019	9	0
Chile	2020	1	0
Chile	2021	0	0
Chile	2022	1	0
Chile	2023	1	0
Chile	2024	4	0
Total		19	0

== Honours ==
Olimpo

- Primera B Nacional: 2009-10

Racing

- Argentine Primera División: 2018–19
- Trofeo de Campeones de la Superliga Argentina: 2019
- Trofeo de Campeones de la Liga Profesional: 2022
- Supercopa Internacional: 2022
- Copa Sudamericana: 2024
- Recopa Sudamericana: 2025
