= Johan Carbonero =

Colombian footballer (born 1999)

Personal information
- Full name: Johan Stiven Carbonero Balanta
- Date of birth: 20 July 1999 (age 27)
- Place of birth: Santander de Quilichao, Colombia
- Height: 1.70 m (5 ft 7 in)
- Position: Left winger

Team information
- Current team: Internacional
- Number: 7

Youth career
- Once Caldas

Senior career*
Years	Team	Apps	(Gls)
2018–2021	Once Caldas	51	(5)
2021	→ Gimnasia LP (loan)	41	(9)
2022	Gimnasia LP	16	(2)
2022–2025	Racing Club	52	(4)
2025	→ Internacional (loan)	33	(7)
2026–	Internacional	14	(1)

International career^{‡}
2019	Colombia U20	6	(0)
2020	Colombia U23	5	(1)
2025–	Colombia	2	(2)
- * Club domestic league appearances and goals as of 8 April 2026 ‡ National team caps and goals as of 15 November 2025

Johan Stiven Carbonero Balanta (born 20 July 1999) is a Colombian footballer who plays as a left winger for Internacional and the Colombia national team.

== Career statistics ==
=== Club ===
As of 7 November 2025

Appearances and goals by club, season and competition
Club	Season	League			State league		Cup		Continental		Total	
Club	Season	Division	Apps	Goals	Apps	Goals	Apps	Goals	Apps	Goals	Apps	Goals
Once Caldas	2018	Categoría Primera A	26	0	—		7	1	—		33	1
Once Caldas	2019	Categoría Primera A	22	5	—		4	0	—		26	5
Once Caldas	2020	Categoría Primera A	3	0	—		—		—		3	0
Once Caldas	Total		51	5	—		11	1	—		62	6
Gimnasia LP	2020–21	Argentine Primera División	24	6	—		—		—		24	6
Gimnasia LP	2021	Argentine Primera División	19	4	—		—		—		19	4
Gimnasia LP	2022	Argentine Primera División	3	1	—		—		14	1	17	2
Gimnasia LP	Total		22	5	—		38	7	—		60	12
Racing Club	2022	Argentine Primera División	16	2	—		2	0	—		18	2
Racing Club	2023	Argentine Primera División	7	0	—		3	1	—		10	1
Racing Club	2024	Argentine Primera División	22	2	—		8	1	7	2	37	5
Racing Club	Total		45	4	—		13	2	7	2	65	8
Internacional	2025	Campeonato Brasileiro Série A	20	4	10	2	2	1	3	0	35	6
Career total			138	17	72	12	2	1	10	2	222	32

=== International ===
As of match played 15 November 2025

Appearances and goals by national team and year
National team	Year	Apps	Goals
Colombia	2025	2	2
Total		2	2

Scores and results list Colombia's goal tally first, score column indicates score after each Carbonero goal.

List of international goals scored by Johan Carbonero
No.	Date	Venue	Cap	Opponent	Score	Result	Competition
1	11 October 2025	AT&T Stadium, Arlington, United States	1	Mexico	4–0	4–0	Friendly
2.	15 November 2025	Chase Stadium, Fort Lauderdale, United States	2	New Zealand	2–1	2–1	Friendly

== Honours ==
Racing Club

- Trofeo de Campeones de la Liga Profesional: 2022
- Copa Sudamericana: 2024

Internacional

- Campeonato Gaúcho: 2025
