= Gabriel Hauche =

Argentine footballer

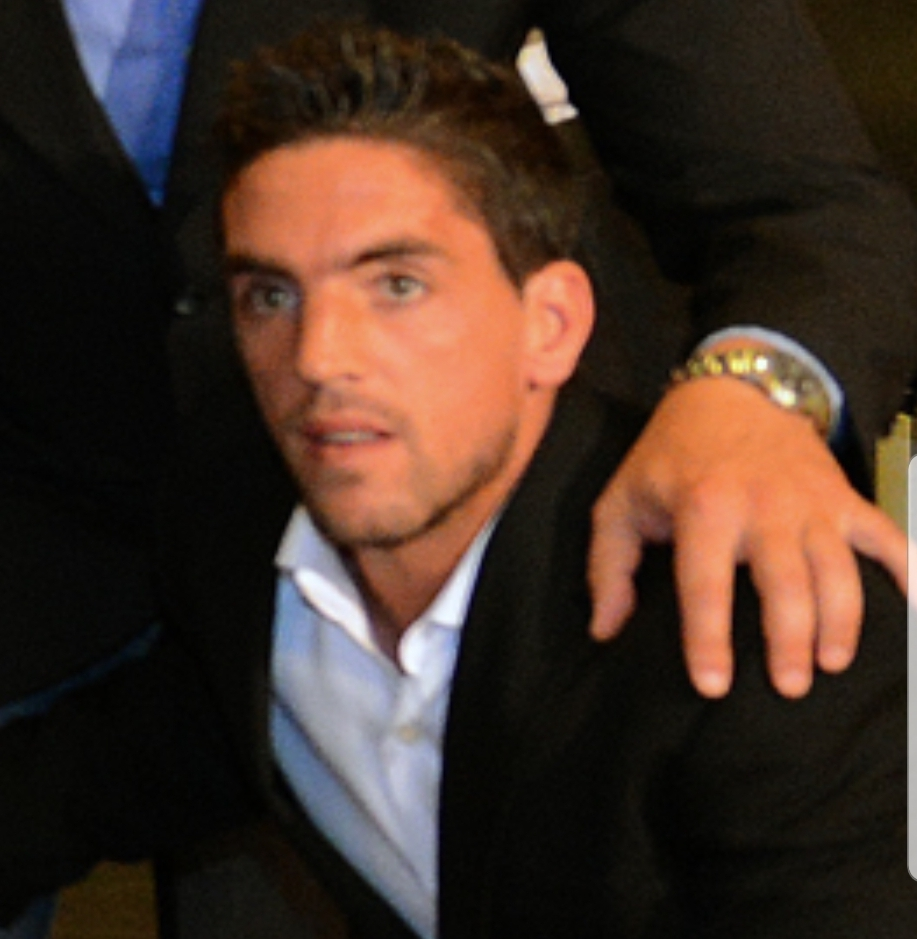
- Hauche in 2014

Personal information
- Full name: Gabriel Agustín Hauche
- Date of birth: November 27, 1986 (age 39)
- Place of birth: Buenos Aires, Argentina
- Height: 1.68 m (5 ft 6 in)
- Position: Second striker

Team information
- Current team: Temperley

Youth career
- Temperley

Senior career*
Years	Team	Apps	(Gls)
2004–2006	Temperley	54	(9)
2007–2010	Argentinos Juniors	124	(31)
2010–2014	Racing Club	148	(27)
2013	→ Chievo (loan)	1	(0)
2015–2018	Tijuana	66	(12)
2017–2018	→ Toluca (loan)	34	(7)
2018–2019	Millonarios	17	(2)
2019–2021	Argentinos Juniors	63	(11)
2021–2022	Aldosivi	11	(5)
2022–2024	Racing	70	(13)
2024	La Calera	14	(0)
2024–2025	Sarmiento	16	(0)
2025–	Temperley	35	(2)

International career
2009–2011	Argentina	5	(3)
- * Club domestic league appearances and goals as of 17:56, 20 April 2026 (UTC)

Gabriel Agustín Hauche, nicknamed Demonio (demon), (born 27 November 1986 in Buenos Aires) is an Argentine professional footballer who plays as a forward for Temperley.

== Career ==
=== Club career ===
Hauche started his playing career with Temperley in the lower leagues of Argentine football in 2004. He was signed by Argentinos Juniors of the Argentine Primera in 2006 and soon established himself as an important member of the first team squad. He was part of the team that reached the semifinals in the Copa Sudamericana 2008, where they lost to Estudiantes de la Plata.

In January 2010 he joined Racing Club de Avellaneda. On 7 February he scored his first goal in Racing Club de Avellenada in a 2–4 defeat to Arsenal de Sarandí.

In December 2014, he became Argentine Primera División champion after defeating direct rivals Godoy Cruz and River Plate.

==== Outside Argentina ====
On 30 December 2014, Hauche was presented as a new player for Liga MX team Club Tijuana. On 13 December 2017, Hauche re-signed a 6-month loan with Deportivo Toluca, following an initial 12-month loan. In July 2018, Hauche signed for Colombian team Millonarios. Hauche scored 3 times in 27 games in all competitions during his time in Colombia.

==== Return to Argentina ====
On 2 January 2019, Hauche re-joined Argentinos Juniors, signing an 18-month contract. On 18 February 2019, Hauche scored his first goal since re-joining the club in the 78th minute against Estudiantes in the Superliga Argentina, to give his team a 2–1 victory.

At 2022, he joined Racing Club again. In November, he won the Trofeo de Campeones de la Liga Profesional, after defeating Boca Juniors 2–1.

==== Unión La Calera ====
In 2024, he moved to Chile and joined Unión La Calera. He left them in July of the same year.

== Career statistics ==
As of match played on 15 April 2019

Appearances and goals by club, season and competition
Club	Season	League			Cup		League Cup		Other		Total	
Club	Season	Division	Apps	Goals	Apps	Goals	Apps	Goals	Apps	Goals	Apps	Goals
Argentinos Juniors	2007–08	Argentine Primera División	?	10	0	0	—				?	10
Argentinos Juniors	2008–09	Argentine Primera División	35	7	0	0	—		8	2	43	9
Argentinos Juniors	2009–10	Argentine Primera División	19	10	0	0	—				19	10
Racing Club	2009–10	Argentine Primera División	18	3	0	0	—				18	3
Racing Club	2010–11	Argentine Primera División	36	10	0	0	—				36	10
Racing Club	2011–12	Argentine Primera División	32	3	5	0	—				37	3
Racing Club	2012–13	Argentine Primera División	14	2	0	0	—		2	1	16	3
Racing Club	2013–14	Argentine Primera División	34	4	1	0	—		1	0	36	4
Racing Club	2014	Argentine Primera División	14	5	0	0	—				14	5
Racing Club	Total		148	27	6	0	0	0	3	1	157	28
Chievo (loan)	2012–13	Serie A	1	0	0	0	—				1	0
Tijuana	2014–15	Liga MX	17	5	0	0	—				17	5
Tijuana	2015–16	Liga MX	30	3	6	2	—				36	5
Tijuana	2016–17	Liga MX	19	4	1	0	—				20	4
Tijuana	Total		66	12	7	2	0	0	0	0	73	14
Toluca	2016–17	Liga MX	20	4	1	0	—				21	4
Toluca	2017–18	Liga MX	14	3	6	0	—				20	3
Toluca	Total		34	7	7	0	0	0	0	0	41	7
Millonarios	2018	Categoría Primera A	17	2	6	0	—		4	1	27	3
Argentinos Juniors	2018–19	Argentine Primera División	10	2	1	1	1	2	0	0	12	5
Argentinos Juniors	Total		64+	29	1	1	1	2	8	2	74+	34
Career totals			330+	77	27	3	1	2	15	4	372+	86

== International career ==
Hauche was called up to the Argentina national team for the first time on September 30, 2009, for a friendly match against Ghana. The Argentine squad was formed exclusively by Argentine league players and included his Argentinos Juniors' teammates Ignacio Canuto and Matías Caruzzo.

He made his second appearance for Argentina in a 3–2 win against Costa Rica on 26 January 2010.

== Honours ==
Racing Club

- 2014 Argentine Primera División
- Trofeo de Campeones de la Liga Profesional: 2022
