= Aníbal Moreno =

Argentine footballer (born 1999)

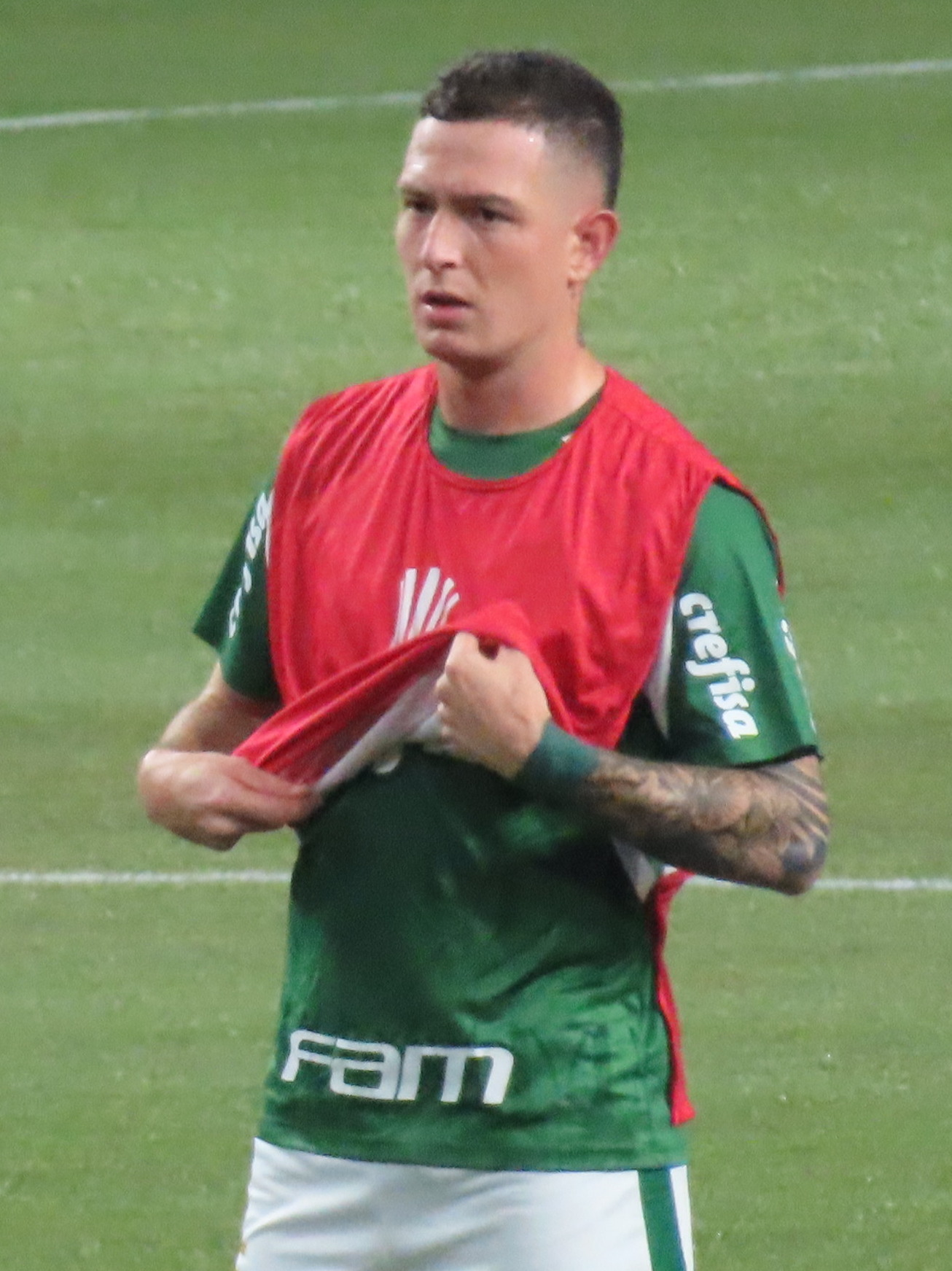

Personal information
- Full name: Aníbal Ismael Moreno
- Date of birth: 13 May 1999 (age 27)
- Place of birth: Catamarca, Argentina
- Height: 1.78 m (5 ft 10 in)
- Position: Midfielder

Team information
- Current team: River Plate
- Number: 6

Youth career
- Barrio Nuevo
- Villa Dolores
- 2011–2013: Academia Duchini
- 2013–2019: Newell's Old Boys

Senior career*
Years	Team	Apps	(Gls)
2019–2022	Newell's Old Boys	23	(1)
2021	→ Racing Club (loan)	32	(1)
2022–2023	Racing Club	15	(0)
2023–2025	Palmeiras	90	(3)
2026–	River Plate	20	(0)

International career^{‡}
2018–2019	Argentina U20	16	(1)
2019	Argentina U23	4	(0)
2025–	Argentina	1	(0)
Medal record
Representing Argentina
Men's Football
Pan American Games
Gold medal – first place	2019 Lima	Team competition
- * Club domestic league appearances and goals as of 17:46, 10 July 2026 (UTC) ‡ National team caps and goals as of 13:36, 15 October 2025 (UTC)

Aníbal Ismael Moreno (born 13 May 1999) is an Argentine professional footballer who plays as a defensive midfielder for Argentine Primera Division club River Plate and the Argentina national team.

== Club career ==
Moreno played the last part of his youth career in Newell's Old Boys' system, signing on 20 January 2013 from Academia Duchini following stints with Barrio Nuevo and Villa Dolores.

After progressing through their academy, Moreno made his bow in professional football on 25 February 2019 as the club faced San Martín at the Estadio Marcelo Bielsa; he was substituted on in place of Maxi Rodríguez during a 3–0 win.

On 15 February 2021, Moreno joined fellow league club Racing Club on a one-year loan deal with a charge of $1 million, and a purchase option that, with bonuses, could potentially reach a total of $6 million. The purchase option would turn into an obligation if Moreno had played a certain number of matches for Racing during the season, which he did, therefore as of 1 January 2022, he became a permanent Racing player. He signed a deal until the end of 2025.

On 21 December 2025, River Plate announced the signing of Moreno until 2029.

== International career ==
Moreno was selected by the Argentina U20s in 2018 to train against the seniors at the FIFA World Cup in Russia. Later that year, he played for the U20s at the L'Alcúdia Tournament in Spain; winning five caps.

In 2019, Moreno received a call-up to represent Argentina at that year's South American U-20 Championship in Chile. He won eight caps and netted one goal, against Uruguay, as they placed second in the final stage; missing out to Ecuador.

Fernando Batista called Moreno up for the 2019 FIFA U-20 World Cup in Poland. In the following months, Moreno was picked for the 2019 Pan American Games in Peru with the U23s. Moreno featured in four of Argentina's five games at the Pan American Games, as they won the tournament after beating Honduras in the final.

== Career statistics ==
=== Club ===
As of 5 June 2019

Appearances and goals by club, season and competition
Club	Season	League			National cup		League cup		Continental		Other		Total	
Club	Season	Division	Apps	Goals	Apps	Goals	Apps	Goals	Apps	Goals	Apps	Goals	Apps	Goals
Newell's Old Boys	2018–19	Argentine Primera División	3	0	0	0	1	0	—		0	0	4	0
Career total			3	0	0	0	1	0	0	0	0	0	4	0

== Honours ==
Racing Club

- Trofeo de Campeones: 2022

Palmeiras

- Campeonato Brasileiro Série A: 2023
- Campeonato Paulista: 2024
- Supercopa do Brasil runner-up: 2024
- Copa Libertadores runner-up: 2025

Argentina U23

- Pan American Games: 2019
