= Catriel Cabellos =

Peruvian footballer

Personal information
- Full name: Jeffrey Catriel Cabellos Vázquez
- Date of birth: 18 August 2004 (age 22)
- Place of birth: Buenos Aires, Argentina
- Height: 1.72 m (5 ft 8 in)
- Position: Midfielder

Team information
- Current team: Sporting Cristal
- Number: 27

Senior career*
Years	Team	Apps	(Gls)
2023–2024	Racing	6	(0)
2024	Alianza Lima (loan)	31	(6)
2025–	Sporting Cristal	17	(0)

International career
2019	Argentina U15	5	(0)
2022–2023	Argentina U20	11	(1)
2022–2023	Peru U20	5	(0)
- * Club domestic league appearances and goals as of 23 August 2025

Jeffrey Catriel Cabellos Vázquez (born 18 August 2004) is a professional footballer who plays as a midfielder for Sporting Cristal. Born in Argentina, he is a youth international for Peru.

== Early life ==
Cabellos started playing football at the age of four.

== Style of play ==
Cabellos operates as a midfielder and is known for his versatility.

== Career ==
On 9 May 2023, Cabellos debuted for Argentine side Racing during a 2–4 loss to Talleres.

== International career ==
Cabellos was born in Argentina to a Peruvian father, and Argentine mother of Brazilian and Paraguayan descent. He is a former youth international for Argentina. In 2022, he debuted with the Peru U20s.

== Career statistics ==
=== Club ===
As of 23 August 2025

Appearances and goals by club, season and competition
Club	Season	League			Cup		Continental		Total	
Club	Season	Division	Apps	Goals	Apps	Goals	Apps	Goals	Apps	Goals
Racing	2023	Argentine Primera División	5	0	1	0	1	0	7	0
Alianza Lima (loan)	2024	Liga 1	31	3	0	0	6	0	37	3
Sporting Cristal	2025	Liga 1	17	0	0	0	6	0	23	0
Career total			53	6	1	0	19	0	73	6

== Honours ==
Racing Club

- Trofeo de Campeones (1): 2022
