= Juan José Cáceres =

Argentine footballer

- Cáceres with Paraguay in 2026

Personal information
- Date of birth: 1 June 2000 (age 26)
- Place of birth: Isla Maciel, Argentina
- Height: 1.73 m (5 ft 8 in)
- Position: Right-back

Team information
- Current team: Dynamo Moscow
- Number: 4

Youth career
- 2008–2016: Boca Juniors
- 2017–2020: Racing Club

Senior career*
Years	Team	Apps	(Gls)
2020–2025	Racing Club	39	(1)
2023–2025	→ Lanús (loan)	58	(1)
2025	Lanús	3	(0)
2025–	Dynamo Moscow	47	(1)

International career^{‡}
2023–	Paraguay	25	(1)
- * Club domestic league appearances and goals as of 22 November 2026 ‡ National team caps and goals as of 17 November 2026

Juan José Cáceres (born 1 June 2000) is a professional footballer who plays as a right-back for Russian Premier League club Dynamo Moscow. Born in Argentina, he plays for the Paraguay national team.

== Club career ==
Cáceres spent eight years in the youth system of Boca Juniors, prior to departing to join Racing Club's academy at the start of 2017. In his second year, Cáceres was involved in a training ground fight with Ricardo Centurión. His breakthrough into the Racing first-team occurred in 2020, with the right-back initially appearing as an unused substitute for a Primera División draw with Colón on 14 February. Cáceres' senior debut soon arrived in the succeeding November, as he featured for the second half of a home defeat to Arsenal de Sarandí.

On 19 February 2025, Cáceres signed a contract until the end of 2029 with Russian club Dynamo Moscow, joining his compatriots Fabián Balbuena and Roberto Fernández in Dynamo's defense.

== International career ==
Cáceres was born in Argentina but is eligible to represent Paraguay through his ancestry.

He made his debut for the Paraguay national team on 18 June 2023 in a friendly match against Nicaragua, which ended in a 2–0 victory.

On 1 June 2026, he was named by head coach Gustavo Alfaro in Paraguay's 26-man squad for the 2026 FIFA World Cup. He started every Paraguay's game at the World Cup, as they qualified for the knockout stage and eliminated Germany in a penalty shoot-out in the Round of 32, before falling 0–1 to France in the Round of 16.

== Personal life ==
Cáceres is of Paraguayan descent. In August 2020, it was revealed that he had tested positive for COVID-19 amid the pandemic; he was asymptomatic.

== Honours ==
Racing Club

- Trofeo de Campeones de la Liga Profesional: 2022

== Career statistics ==
=== Club ===
As of 22 November 2026.

Appearances and goals by club, season and competition
Club	Season	League			Cup		Continental		Total	
Club	Season	Division	Apps	Goals	Apps	Goals	Apps	Goals	Apps	Goals
Racing Club	2019–20	AFA Liga Profesional de Fútbol	0	0	0	0	0	0	0	0
Racing Club	2020–21 (Note: Soccerway counts Copa de la Liga Profesional appearances as league appearances.)	AFA Liga Profesional de Fútbol	6	0	2	0	5 (Note: Appearances in Copa Libertadores)	0	13	0
Racing Club	2021	AFA Liga Profesional de Fútbol	25	1	0	0	0	0	25	1
Racing Club	2022	AFA Liga Profesional de Fútbol	7	0	2	0	0	0	9	0
Racing Club	2023	AFA Liga Profesional de Fútbol	1	0	0	0	0	0	1	0
Racing Club	Total		39	1	4	0	5	0	48	1
Lanús	2023	AFA Liga Profesional de Fútbol	30	1	2	0	0	0	32	1
Lanús	2024	AFA Liga Profesional de Fútbol	28	0	0	0	5 (Note: Appearances in Copa Sudamericana)	0	33	0
Lanús	2025	AFA Liga Profesional de Fútbol	3	0	—		—		3	0
Lanús	Total		61	1	2	0	5	0	68	1
Dynamo Moscow	2024–25	Russian Premier League	10	0	3	0	—		13	0
Dynamo Moscow	2025–26	Russian Premier League	24	1	7	0	—		31	1
Dynamo Moscow	2026–27	Russian Premier League	13	0	2	0	—		15	0
Dynamo Moscow	Total		47	1	12	0	0	0	59	1
Career total			147	3	18	0	10	0	175	3

=== International ===
As of match played 17 November 2026

Appearances and goals by national team and year
National team	Year	Apps	Goals
Paraguay	2023	3	0
Paraguay	2024	4	0
Paraguay	2025	8	0
Paraguay	2026	10	1
Total		25	1

Scores and results list Paraguay's goal tally first, score column indicates score after each Cáceres goal.

List of international goals scored by Juan José Cáceres
No.	Date	Venue	Opponent	Score	Result	Competition
1	17 November 2026	National Stadium, Kallang, Singapore	Japan	1–0	2–1	Friendly
