= 2022 Trofeo de Campeones de la Liga Profesional =

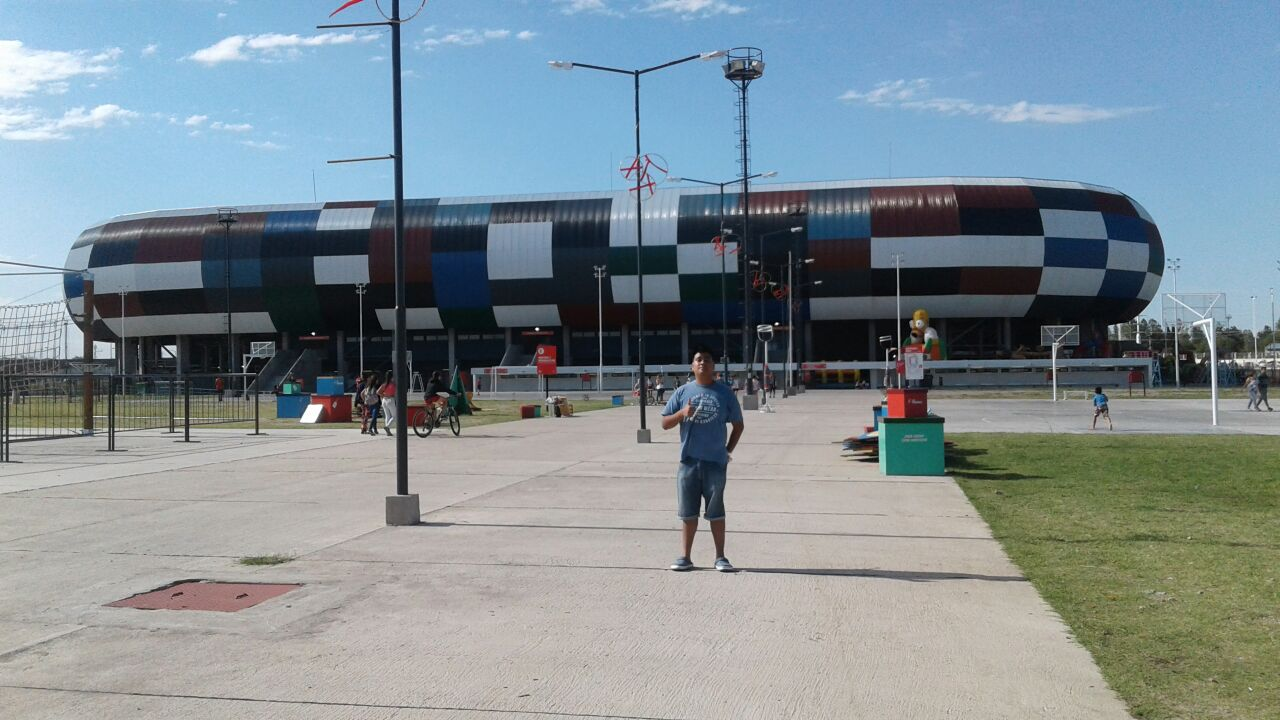
- Estadio Único de Villa Mercedes, venue for the final
- Event: Trofeo de Campeones (LPF)
Boca Juniors	Racing
1	2
- The match was ended before the end of extra time
- Date: November 6, 2022
- Venue: Estadio Único, Villa Mercedes
- Referee: Facundo Tello

The 2022 Trofeo de Campeones de la Liga Profesional (officially the Trofeo de Campeones Binance 2022 for sponsorship reasons) was the third edition of the Trofeo de Campeones de la Liga Profesional, an annual football match contested by the winners of Primera División and Copa de la Liga Profesional competitions, similar to the defunct Trofeo de Campeones de la Superliga Argentina.

As Boca Juniors won both championships, 2022 Primera División and 2022 Copa de la Liga Profesional, Racing and Tigre (runners-up of the aforementioned competitions) played a semi-final to define the rival of Boca Juniors. Racing defeated Tigre by a 3–2 score.

The final was played on 6 November 2022 at Estadio Único in Villa Mercedes, between Boca Juniors and Racing. Racing won their first title after the referee finished the match before the end of extra time after five Boca Juniors players had been sent off with Racing leading the score 2–1. The decision was taken according to the laws of the game, which rule that each team must have a minimum of seven players on field, otherwise the match can't be started or continued.

== Qualified teams ==
#	Team	Qualification	Previous app.
1	Boca Juniors	2022 Primera División and 2022 Copa LPF champions	(None)
2	Tigre (Note: Played a semi-final to define another finalist.)	2022 Copa LPF runners-up	(None)
2	Racing	2022 Primera División runners-up	(None)

== Matches ==
=== Semi-final ===
==== Summary ====
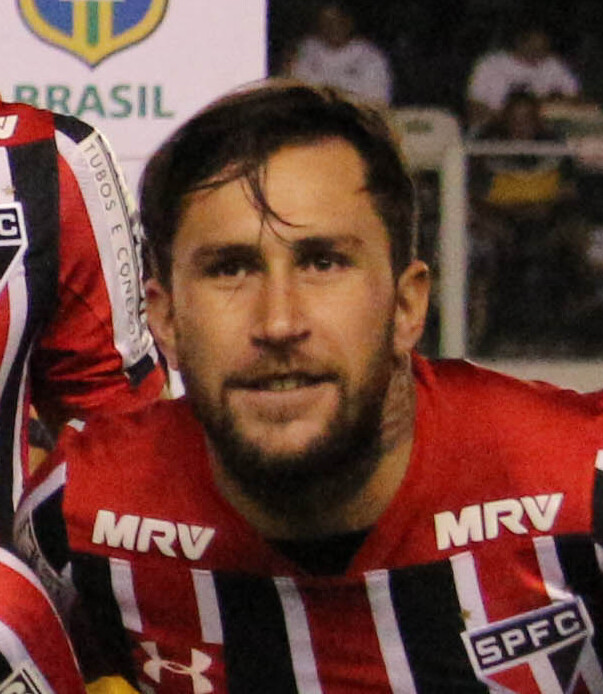
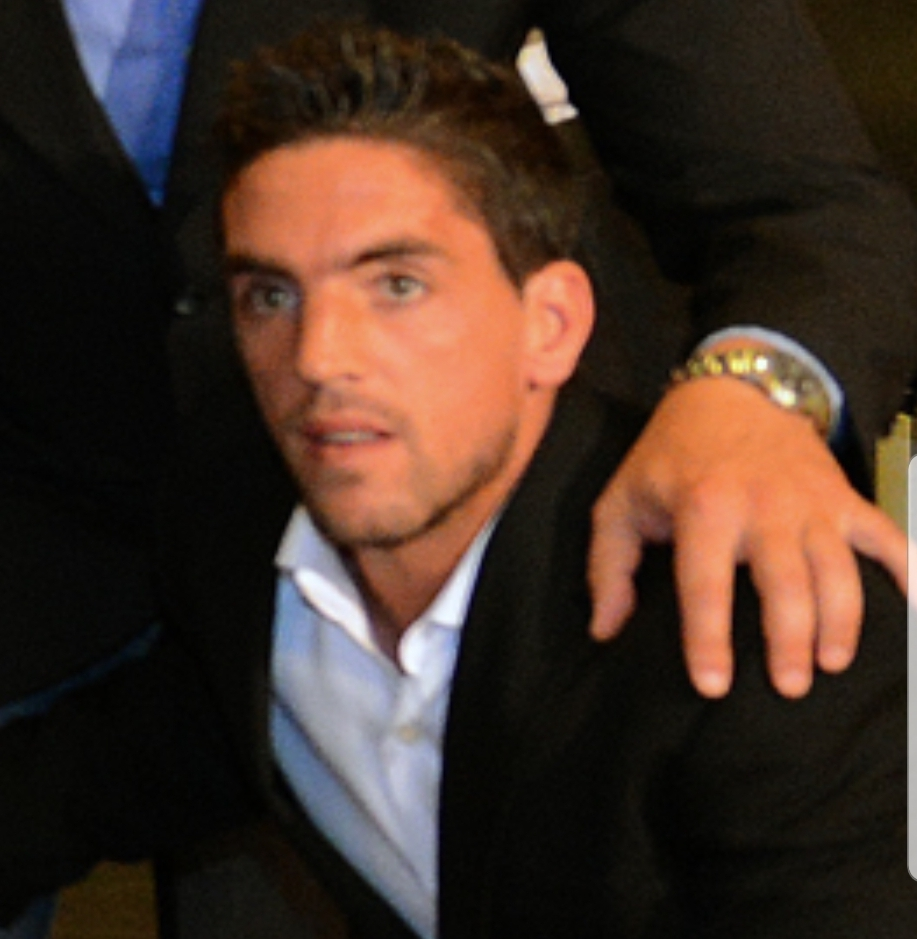
Jonathan Gómez (left) and Gabriel Hauche scored the 2nd and 3rd goals for Racing

The team managed by Fernando Gago had to overcome the score after losing 2–0 at the end of the first half. Mateo Retegui, from a penalty kick, and Facundo Colidio broke the score taking the lead for the team managed by Diego Martínez, who were with one less player due to the sending off of defender Abel Luciatti for a double yellow card in the 31st minute.

But Racing insisted and with Maximiliano Romero, who had replaced injured Enzo Copetti, scored Racing's first goal at 58 minutes. With 7 minutes to go, an assist from Romero left Jonathan Gómez alone to tie the match and force the extra time.

In extra time, with both teams physically tired, Racing continued pushing and achieved victory with another player who came on from the substitute bench, Gabriel Hauche, who headed a long pass from Johan Carbonero that Tigre goalkeeper Gonzalo Marinelli could not stop to secure a 3–2 victory therefore the team from Avellaneda qualified to play the final v Boca Juniors.

==== Details ====
2 November 2022
15:00 UTC−3

Tigre	2–3 (a.e.t.)	Racing
Retegui 28' (pen.); Colidio 37'	Report	Romero 58'; Gómez 83'; Hauche 117'

Estadio Tomás Adolfo Ducó, Buenos Aires
Referee: Diego Herrera

Tigre	Racing

GK	23	(Argentina) Gonzalo Marinelli (c)	(yellow card) 103'
DF	17	(Argentina) Lucas Blondel		(substituted off) 73'
DF	36	(Argentina) Víctor Cabrera		(substituted off) 91'
DF	6	(Argentina) Abel Luciatti	(yellow card) 13' (yellow-red card) 32'
DF	20	(Argentina) Sebastián Prieto
MF	16	(Argentina) Alexis Castro
MF	42	(Argentina) Ezequiel Fernández
MF	10	(Argentina) Lucas Menossi		(substituted off) 62'
FW	18	(Paraguay) Blas Armoa		(substituted off) 34'
FW	32	(Argentina) Mateo Retegui		(substituted off) 73'
FW	11	(Argentina) Facundo Colidio		(substituted off) 62'
Substitutes:
GK	1	(Argentina) Manuel Roffo
DF	4	(Argentina) Martín Ortega		(substituted on) 62'
DF	8	(Argentina) Martín Galmarini
DF	14	(Argentina) Diego Sosa
DF	30	(Argentina) Brian Leizza		(substituted on) 34'
MF	5	(Argentina) Sebastián Prediger		(substituted on) 62'
MF	25	(Argentina) Agustín Baldi		(substituted on) 91'
MF	26	(Argentina) Ezequiel Forclaz
MF	27	(Argentina) Cristian Zabala	(yellow card) 120'	(substituted on) 73'
FW	7	(Argentina) Pablo Magnín
FW	9	(Argentina) Ijiel Protti
FW	29	(Argentina) Gonzalo Flores		(substituted on) 73'
Manager:
(Argentina) Diego Martínez

GK	21	(Chile) Gabriel Arias
DF	4	(Argentina) Iván Pillud (c)		(substituted off) 59'
DF	30	(Argentina) Leonardo Sigali
DF	33	(Argentina) Gonzalo Piovi		(substituted off) 106'
DF	5	(Chile) Eugenio Mena		(substituted off) 59'
MF	11	(Argentina) Jonathan Gómez		(substituted off) 90+1'
MF	29	(Argentina) Aníbal Moreno
MF	22	(Argentina) Carlos Alcaraz
FW	10	(Paraguay) Matías Rojas		(substituted off) 90+2'
FW	9	(Argentina) Enzo Copetti	(yellow card) 28'	(substituted off) 43'
FW	17	(Colombia) Johan Carbonero	(yellow card) 67'
Substitutes:
GK	13	(Argentina) Matías Tagliamonte
DF	6	(Argentina) Lucas Orbán
DF	8	(Argentina) Jonathan Galván	(yellow card) 120+3'	(substituted on) 106'
DF	12	(Uruguay) Fernando Prado
DF	34	(Argentina) Facundo Mura		(substituted on) 90+1'
DF	48	(Argentina) Emiliano Insúa	(yellow card) 106'	(substituted on) 59'
MF	14	(Argentina) Maico Quiroz
MF	19	(Argentina) Leonel Miranda
MF	23	(Argentina) Nicolás Oroz	(yellow card) 112'	(substituted on) 90+2'
MF	31	(Peru) Catriel Cabellos
FW	7	(Argentina) Gabriel Hauche		(substituted on) 59'
FW	15	(Argentina) Maximiliano Romero		(substituted on) 43'
Manager:
(Argentina) Fernando Gago

Assistant referees:
Facundo Rodríguez
José Savorani
Fourth official:
Hernán Mastrángelo
Video assistant referee:
Fernando Espinoza
Assistant video assistant referee:
Héctor Paletta

Match rules

- 90 minutes.
- 30 minutes of extra time if necessary.
- Penalty shoot-out if scores still level.
- Twelve named substitutes.
- Maximum of five substitutions, with a sixth allowed in extra time.

=== Final ===
Marcos Rojo, Exequiel Zeballos (Boca Juniors), Emiliano Vecchio and Enzo Copetti (Racing) were ruled out of the final due to injuries. Edwin Cardona was excluded from Racing.

==== Summary ====
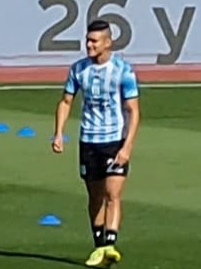
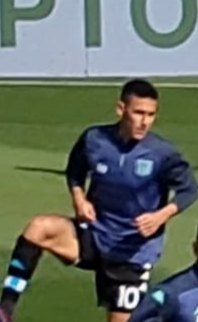
Charly Alcaraz (left) and Matías Rojas scored for Racing Club

The first half was uneventful, with neither team gaining an advantage through their play and occasionally exchanging possession to control the game, resulting in a goal and a draw at halftime. In the second half, Racing Club showed greater determination to secure the victory, despite the fatigue from playing extra time against Tigre the previous Wednesday.

Boca Juniors lacked cohesion and possession, and the physical toll of the game became increasingly evident in the team coached by Fernando Gago as the minutes ticked by. The score remained level until the end of regulation time, forcing extra time to determine the champion. The final minutes of extra time were less exciting due to the physical exhaustion of both sides.

Racing Club looked slightly better in extra time and capitalized on their numerical advantage after Alan Varela was sent off for a second yellow card. Ball control, persistence, and attacking momentum allowed Fernando Gago's team to find the winning goal with a header from Carlos Alcaraz after a precise cross from Gonzalo Piovi on the left.

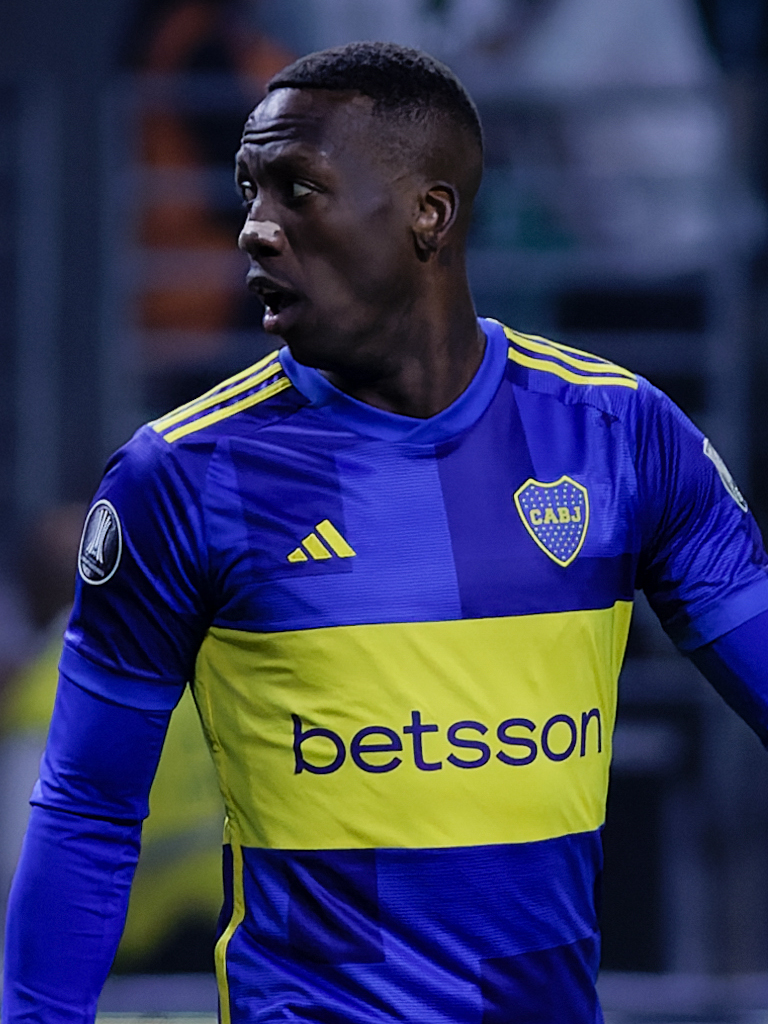
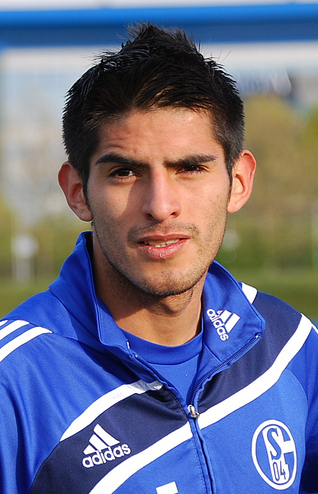
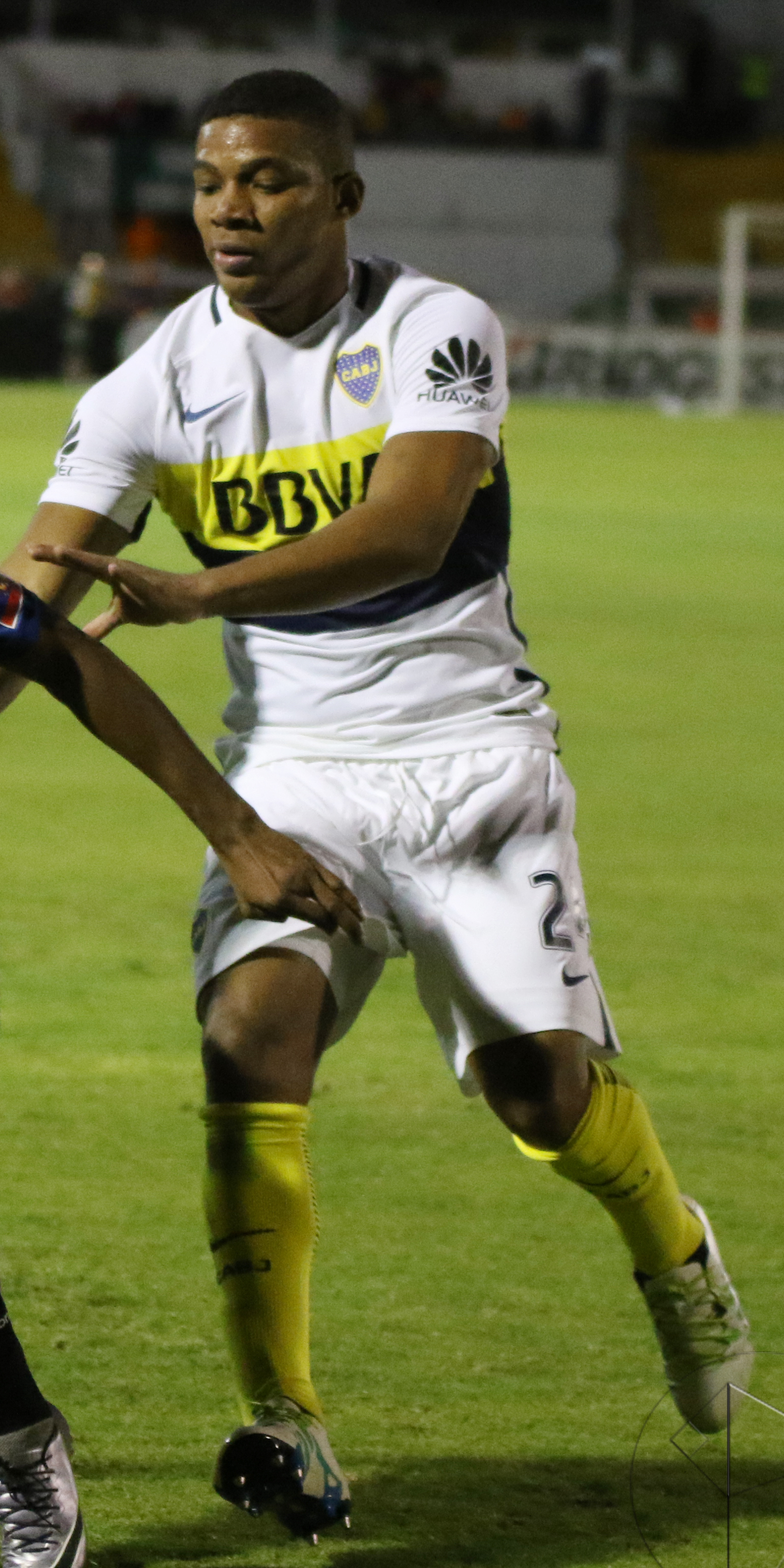
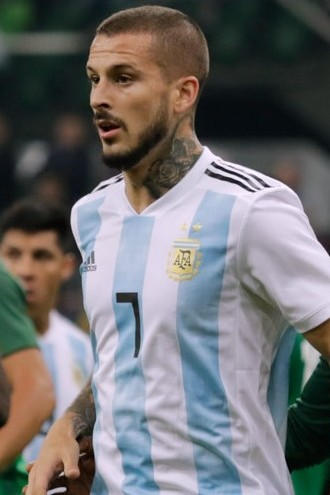
Fltr: Luis Advíncula, Carlos Zambrano, Frank Fabra, and Darío Benedetto, four out of seven Boca Juniors players sent off

The final stretch of the match was very physical, with clashes between several players from both teams, a situation that ended in a scandal and almost marred the final between the two best teams of the 2022 season. It all started with an exchange of blows between the Colombians Johan Carbonero and Sebastián Villa, who were both sent off, and after Alcaraz's goal, the Boca Juniors players reprimanded him for celebrating in front of the "Xeneize" supporters. Once again, there were punches, shoves, insults, threats, and referee Facundo Tello handing out red cards left and right, reaching five for Boca Juniors players. Since they had fewer than seven players on the field, they were legally barred from continuing to play, and the match was awarded to them forfeited, regardless of the score.

Thus, after Alan Varela and Villa, in addition to coach Hugo Ibarra, Frank Fabra, Luis Advíncula, and Darío Benedetto were also sent off. Benedetto's dismissal came after a VAR review for making the "classic" gesture of "fixing" a match for Racing, striking his right fist against his left palm as a symbol of some kind of "payment."

On Racing's side, in addition to Carbonero, Alcaraz was also sent off for taking off his shirt after scoring and fighting with his opponents, as was Jonathan Galván, who was on the bench. The same happened to defender Carlos Zambrano while he was on the Boca Juniors bench.

==== Details ====
6 November 2022
17:00 UTC−3

Boca Juniors	1–2 (a.e.t.)	Racing
Briasco 18'	Report	Rojas 22'; Alcaraz 117'

Estadio Único, Villa Mercedes
Referee: Facundo Tello

Boca Juniors	Racing

GK	1	(Argentina) Agustín Rossi
DF	17	(Peru) Luis Advíncula	(red card) 120+5'
DF	5	(Peru) Carlos Zambrano	(red card) 120+5'	(substituted off) 46'
DF	4	(Argentina) Nicolás Figal	(yellow card) 81'
DF	18	(Colombia) Frank Fabra	(yellow card) 110' (yellow-red card) 120+8'
MF	8	(Argentina) Guillermo Fernández (c)	(yellow card) 39'	(substituted off) 83'
MF	33	(Argentina) Alan Varela	(yellow card) 71' (yellow-red card) 99'
MF	20	(Argentina) Juan Ramírez		(substituted off) 84'
FW	29	(Armenia) Norberto Briasco		(substituted off) 72'
FW	38	(Argentina) Luis Vázquez		(substituted off) 64'
FW	22	(Colombia) Sebastián Villa	(red card) 90+4'
Substitutes:
GK	13	(Argentina) Javier García
DF	3	(Argentina) Agustín Sández		(substituted on) 46'
DF	39	(Argentina) Gabriel Aranda
DF	57	(Argentina) Marcelo Weigandt
MF	10	(Paraguay) Óscar Romero		(substituted on) 84'
MF	14	(Argentina) Esteban Rolón
MF	16	(Argentina) Aaron Molinas
MF	23	(Argentina) Diego González	(red card) 120+5'
MF	36	(Argentina) Cristian Medina	(yellow card) 87'	(substituted on) 83'
FW	9	(Argentina) Darío Benedetto	(red card) 120+10'	(substituted on) 72'
FW	27	(Argentina) Nicolás Orsini
FW	41	(Argentina) Luca Langoni		(substituted on) 64'
Manager:
(Argentina) Hugo Ibarra (red card) 90+6'

GK	21	(Chile) Gabriel Arias
DF	34	(Argentina) Facundo Mura	(yellow card) 72'	(substituted off) 78'
DF	30	(Argentina) Leonardo Sigali (c)
DF	33	(Argentina) Gonzalo Piovi
DF	5	(Chile) Eugenio Mena	(yellow card) 33'
MF	11	(Argentina) Jonathan Gómez		(substituted off) 60'
MF	29	(Argentina) Aníbal Moreno
MF	10	(Paraguay) Matías Rojas		(substituted off) 78'
FW	7	(Argentina) Gabriel Hauche	(yellow card) 26'	(substituted off) 60'
FW	15	(Argentina) Maximiliano Romero
FW	17	(Colombia) Johan Carbonero	(red card) 90+4'
Substitutes:
GK	13	(Argentina) Matías Tagliamonte
DF	2	(Argentina) Juan José Cáceres
DF	4	(Argentina) Iván Pillud		(substituted on) 78'
DF	6	(Argentina) Lucas Orbán
DF	8	(Argentina) Jonathan Galván	(red card) 120+5'
DF	12	(Uruguay) Fernando Prado
DF	48	(Argentina) Emiliano Insúa		(substituted on) 78'
MF	14	(Argentina) Maico Quiroz
MF	19	(Argentina) Leonel Miranda	(yellow card) 76'	(substituted on) 60'	(substituted off) 99'
MF	22	(Argentina) Carlos Alcaraz	(yellow card) 112' (red card) 120+4'	(substituted on) 60'
MF	23	(Argentina) Nicolás Oroz			(substituted on) 99'
MF	31	(Peru) Catriel Cabellos
Manager:
(Argentina) Fernando Gago

Assistant referees:
Cristian Navarro
Sebastián Raineri
Fourth official:
Leandro Rey Hilfer
Fifth official:
Gerardo Carretero
Video assistant referee:
Diego Abal
Assistant video assistant referees:
Lucas Novelli
Diego Verlotta

Match rules

- 90 minutes.
- 30 minutes of extra time if necessary.
- Penalty shoot-out if scores still level.
- Twelve named substitutes.
- Maximum of five substitutions, with a sixth allowed in extra time.

Finished because of laws of the game rule 3 infringement.

==== Statistics ====
Overall
	Boca Juniors	Racing
Goals scored	1	2
Total shots	16	18
Shots on target	5	10
Ball possession	47%	53%
Corner kicks	3	4
Fouls committed	17	21
Offsides	2	2
Yellow cards	7	5
Red cards	7	3
