= Jhamir D'Arrigo =

Peruvian footballer

Personal information
- Full name: Jhamir Adrián D'Arrigo Huanca
- Date of birth: 15 November 1999 (age 26)
- Place of birth: Callao, Peru
- Height: 1.68 m (5 ft 6 in)
- Position: Winger

Team information
- Current team: Melgar
- Number: 80

Youth career
- 2018–2019: Academia Cantolao

Senior career*
Years	Team	Apps	(Gls)
2020–2022	Academia Cantolao	64	(7)
2023	Melgar	32	(1)
2024–2025	Alianza Lima	38	(2)
2025–	Melgar	31	(0)
- * Club domestic league appearances and goals as of 22:49, 14 November 2026 (UTC)

Jhamir Adrián D'Arrigo Huanca (born 15 November 1999) is a Peruvian footballer who plays as a winger for Melgar. He has played over 150 games in the Peruvian Primera División, in which he also represented Academia Cantolao and Alianza Lima.

== Club career ==
=== Deportivo Cantolao ===
Born in Callao, D'Arrigo began his career at hometown club Academia Cantolao in 2018. Two years later, he received his first contract to play in the Peruvian Primera División in the 2020 season. He made his debut on 2 February, starting in a 2–1 home win over Cienciano on the opening day. He played 13 games over the season, scoring once on 31 August as a consolation at the end of a 6–2 home loss to Sporting Cristal.

In the 2021 season, D'Arrigo played more frequently as other players in his position departed the club. On 28 August, he put Cantolao 2–0 up away to Club Universitario de Deportes, though the game ended in a draw. In 2022, he scored a career-best five goals in 29 games, including two on 6 March in a 3–2 win over Carlos A. Mannucci at the Estadio Miguel Grau.

=== Melgar ===
D'Arrigo's performances in 2022 earned the attention of Alianza Lima, but he instead opted for Melgar on a three-year deal, ahead of the Arequipa-based club's first year in the Copa Libertadores. He played four games in that continental campaign, scoring on 6 June to cap a 5–0 home win over Patronato of Argentina. His only goal of the league season in 2023 came six days earlier in a 2–2 draw at home to César Vallejo.

=== Alianza Lima ===
At the end of 2023, D'Arrigo did sign for Alianza, on a four-year contract. The club from Lima met his release clause of US$500,000. He made his debut on 4 February as a substitute away to Alianza Atlético and set up the second goal of a 2–0 win for Sebastián Rodríguez. His first goal came on 19 May to open a 3–2 home win over Deportivo Garcilaso. He made 43 appearances for the club, scored twice, and assisted four goals.

=== Melgar return ===
On 9 August 2025, Melgar paid US$150,000 to bring D'Arrigo back, on a contract until 2028.

== International career ==
At the start of September 2023, D'Arrigo was named in the Peru national football team for 2026 FIFA World Cup qualifiers against Paraguay and Brazil, due to Bryan Reyna's injury. Still uncapped, he was named in a preliminary squad for the 2024 Copa América in the United States, but dropped from Jorge Fossati's final 26-man squad.

== Personal life ==
In June 2024, an ex-partner of D'Arrigo with whom he had a daughter, denounced him on television for alleged physical abuse. He allegedly responded by threatening to diffuse intimate photos of her.

== Career statistics ==
=== Club ===
As of match played 31 October 2025.

Club	Division	Season	League		National cup		Continental		Total	
Club	Division	Season	Apps	Goals	Apps	Goals	Apps	Goals	Apps	Goals
Academia Cantolao	Liga 1	2020	13	1	—		—		13	1
Academia Cantolao	Liga 1	2021	22	1	0	0	—		22	1
Academia Cantolao	Liga 1	2022	29	5	—		—		29	5
Academia Cantolao	Total		64	7	0	0	0	0	64	7
Melgar	Liga 1	2023	32	1	—		4	1	36	2
Alianza Lima	Liga 1	2024	23	2	—		2	0	25	2
Alianza Lima	Liga 1	2025	15	0	—		3	0	18	0
Alianza Lima	Total		38	2	0	0	5	0	43	2
Melgar	Liga 1	2025	12	0	—		—		12	0
Melgar	Liga 1	2026	0	0	—		—		0	0
Melgar	Total		44	1	0	0	4	1	48	2
Career total			146	10	0	0	9	1	155	11
