= Nicolás Oroz =

Argentine footballer

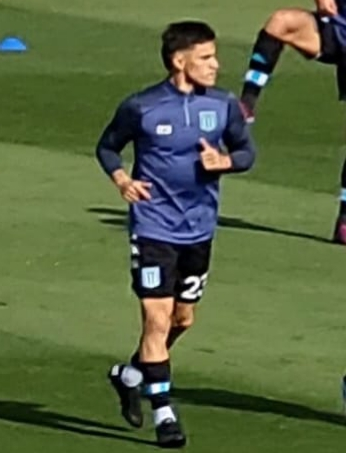

Personal information
- Full name: Nicolás Adrián Oroz
- Date of birth: 1 April 1994 (age 32)
- Place of birth: Villa Mercedes, Argentina
- Height: 1.73 m (5 ft 8 in)
- Position: Attacking midfielder

Team information
- Current team: Argentinos Juniors
- Number: 11

Youth career
- Racing Club

Senior career*
Years	Team	Apps	(Gls)
2013–2024	Racing Club	46	(3)
2016–2017	→ Chacarita Juniors (loan)	63	(10)
2018	→ O'Higgins (loan)	30	(7)
2019	→ Universidad de Chile (loan)	21	(2)
2020–2021	→ Al-Wasl (loan)	22	(3)
2021–2022	→ Volos (loan)	18	(5)
2024–	Argentinos Juniors	91	(5)
- * Club domestic league appearances and goals as of 17:20, 10 July 2026 (UTC)

Nicolás Adrián Oroz (born 1 April 1994) is an Argentine professional footballer who plays as an attacking midfielder for Argentinos Juniors.

== Career ==
Born in Villa Mercedes, San Luis, he became The Academy in his teens, where 19 Date Closing tournament debut against Godoy Cruz de Mendoza where replacement Roger Martinez where Racing lost 2 to 1. After 10 minutes juice Copa Argentina coming off the bench replacing nothing less than a Diego Milito where his team was victorious 1–0 against San Martín (SJ).

For the First Division Championship 2014 (Argentina) played in the match Racing won 2–1 to mouth having an acceptable performance. Against Atlético Rafaela again replaces Diego Milito in defeat 2 to 0. Play his fifth game against Olimpo de Bahia Blanca in the tie 1-1 where replacement Luciano Aued. Despite playing only 3 games, 20 years and a long future ahead champion after 13 years with The Academy.

== Honours ==
Racing Club

- Torneo Transición: 2014
- Trofeo de Campeones de la Liga Profesional: 2022
