= Jonathan Galván =

Argentine footballer

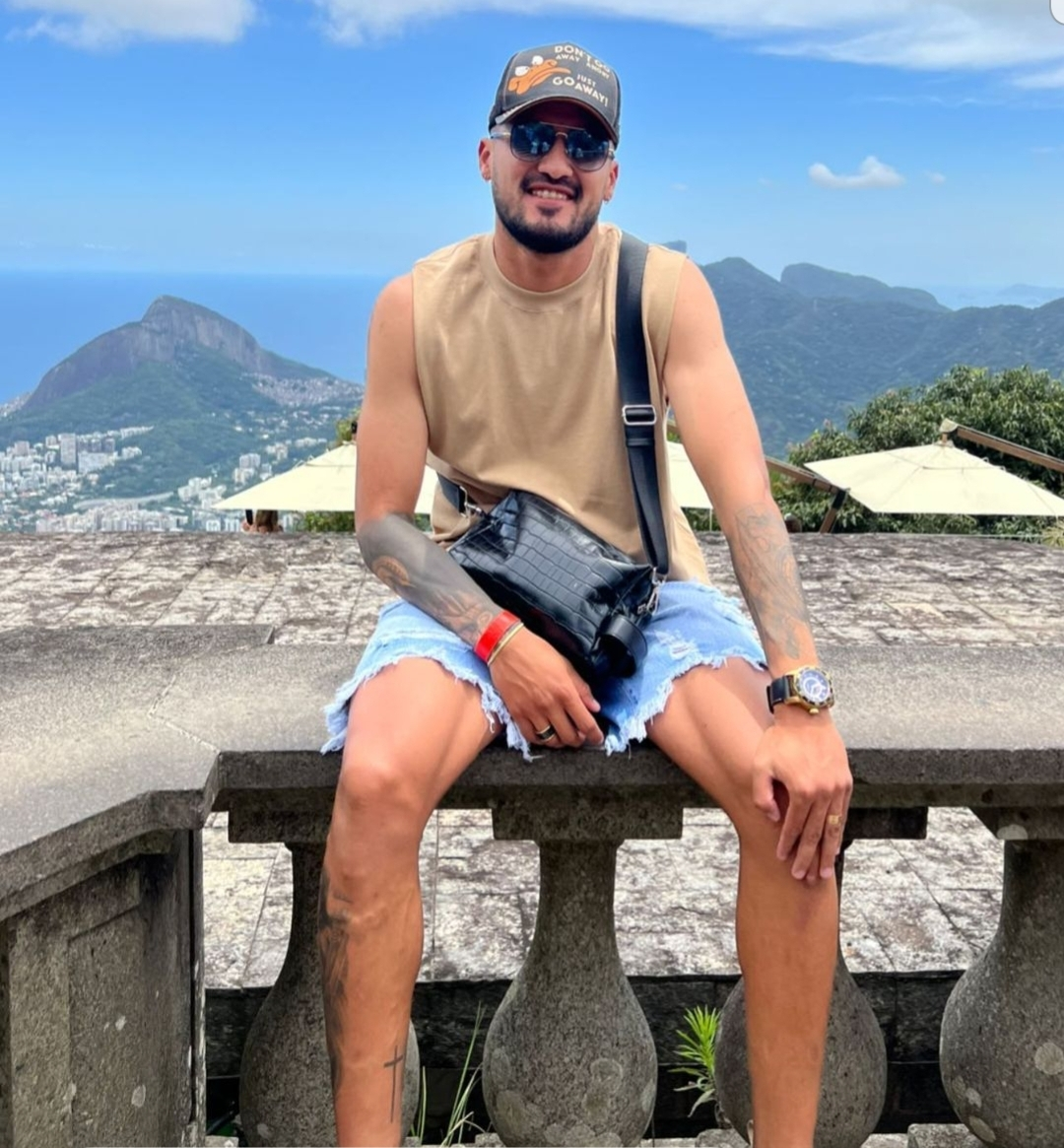

Personal information
- Full name: Jonathan Sebastián Galván
- Date of birth: 25 June 1992 (age 34)
- Place of birth: Mar del Plata, Argentina
- Height: 1.79 m (5 ft 10 in)
- Position: Centre-back

Team information
- Current team: Instituto (on loan from Argentinos Juniors)
- Number: 30

Youth career
- Aldosivi

Senior career*
Years	Team	Apps	(Gls)
2011–2017	Aldosivi	173	(6)
2017–2019	Colón	4	(0)
2019–	Argentinos Juniors	41	(2)
2020	→ Central Córdoba (loan)	3	(0)
2020	→ Unión Santa Fe (loan)	14	(0)
2021–2022	→ Huracán (loan)	42	(2)
2022–2023	→ Racing Club (loan)	25	(0)
2025	→ Central Córdoba SdE (loan)	28	(1)
2026–	→ Instituto (loan)	13	(0)
- * Club domestic league appearances and goals as of 18:15, 10 May 2026 (UTC)

Jonathan Sebastián Galván (born 25 June 1992) is an Argentine professional footballer who plays as a centre-back for Instituto, on loan from Argentinos Juniors.

== Career ==
Galván began in the youth ranks of Primera B Nacional side Aldosivi, he was promoted into the club's first-team in 2011. He was first selected in the matchday squad on 9 April 2011 for the 2010–11 Argentine Primera División fixture against Tiro Federal, but he was an unused substitute. His first appearance for the club came on 3 September in 2011–12 versus Guillermo Brown, a match the club won 5–0. Over the course of 2011–12, 2012–13 and 2013–14, Galván managed to score his first career goal (vs. Gimnasia de Jujuy) but also received four red cards during that time. Over those years he made eighty-two league appearances for Aldosivi.

2014 saw Galván and Aldosivi gain promotion into the Argentine Primera División after they qualified from the 2014 Primera B Nacional. In his debut season in Argentina's top-flight he managed twenty-seven appearances, scored one goal but also received another red card. In total, Galván played one hundred and seventy-seven times and scored six goals for Aldosivi in six years. In July 2017, following Aldosivi's relegation, Galván completed a transfer to top-flight club Colón. Four matches followed in 2017–18, before none occurred in the first five months of 2018–19 which led to the midfielder leaving to Argentinos Juniors on 21 January 2019.

On 21 July 2021, Galván joined Huracán on a 18-month loan deal with a purchase option. However, the spell was cut short and Galván was instead loaned out to Racing Club on 14 July 2022, until the end of 2023 with an option to purchase $800,000 for half for half of his rights.

== Honours ==
Racing Club

- Trofeo de Campeones de la Liga Profesional: 2022

== Career statistics ==
As of 29 January 2019.

Club statistics
Club	Season	League			Cup		Continental		Other		Total	
Club	Season	Division	Apps	Goals	Apps	Goals	Apps	Goals	Apps	Goals	Apps	Goals
Aldosivi	2010–11	Primera B Nacional	0	0	0	0	—		0	0	0	0
Aldosivi	2011–12	Primera B Nacional	22	0	0	0	—		0	0	22	0
Aldosivi	2012–13	Primera B Nacional	32	1	1	0	—		0	0	33	1
Aldosivi	2013–14	Primera B Nacional	28	0	0	0	—		0	0	28	0
Aldosivi	2014	Primera B Nacional	21	1	0	0	—		0	0	21	1
Aldosivi	2015	Primera División	27	1	1	0	—		0	0	28	1
Aldosivi	2016	Primera División	14	1	1	0	—		0	0	15	1
Aldosivi	2016–17	Primera División	29	2	1	0	—		0	0	30	2
Aldosivi	Total		173	6	4	0	—		0	0	177	6
Colón	2017–18	Primera División	4	0	0	0	0	0	0	0	4	0
Colón	2018–19	Primera División	0	0	0	0	0	0	0	0	0	0
Colón	Total		4	0	0	0	0	0	0	0	4	0
Argentinos Juniors	2018–19	Primera División	0	0	0	0	0	0	0	0	0	0
Career total			177	6	4	0	0	0	0	0	181	6
