= 2024 Copa Libertadores final stages =

The 2024 Copa Libertadores final stages were played from 13 August to 30 November 2024. A total of 16 teams competed in the final stages to decide the champions of the 2024 Copa Libertadores, with the final played at Estadio Monumental in Buenos Aires, Argentina.

== Qualified teams ==
The winners and runners-up of each of the eight groups in the group stage advanced to the round of 16.

Group	Winners	Runners-up
A	(Brazilian Football Confederation) Fluminense	(Football Federation of Chile) Colo-Colo
B	(Brazilian Football Confederation) São Paulo	(Argentine Football Association) Talleres
C	(Bolivian Football Federation) The Strongest	(Brazilian Football Confederation) Grêmio
D	(Colombian Football Federation) Junior	(Brazilian Football Confederation) Botafogo
E	(Bolivian Football Federation) Bolívar	(Brazilian Football Confederation) Flamengo
F	(Brazilian Football Confederation) Palmeiras	(Argentine Football Association) San Lorenzo
G	(Brazilian Football Confederation) Atlético Mineiro	(Uruguayan Football Association) Peñarol
H	(Argentine Football Association) River Plate	(Uruguayan Football Association) Nacional

=== Seeding ===
Starting from the round of 16, the teams were seeded according to their results in the group stage, with the group winners (Pot 1) seeded 1–8, and the group runners-up (Pot 2) seeded 9–16.

Seed	Grp	Team	Pld	W	D	L	GF	GA	GD	Pts	Round of 16 draw
1	H	(Argentine Football Association) River Plate	6	5	1	0	12	3	+9	16	Pot 1
2	G	(Brazilian Football Confederation) Atlético Mineiro	6	5	0	1	14	6	+8	15	Pot 1
3	F	(Brazilian Football Confederation) Palmeiras	6	4	2	0	14	5	+9	14	Pot 1
4	A	(Brazilian Football Confederation) Fluminense	6	4	2	0	9	5	+4	14	Pot 1
5	B	(Brazilian Football Confederation) São Paulo	6	4	1	1	10	3	+7	13	Pot 1
6	E	(Bolivian Football Federation) Bolívar	6	4	1	1	13	9	+4	13	Pot 1
7	D	(Colombian Football Federation) Junior	6	2	4	0	7	4	+3	10	Pot 1
8	C	(Bolivian Football Federation) The Strongest	6	3	1	2	8	6	+2	10	Pot 1
9	B	(Argentine Football Association) Talleres	6	4	1	1	10	6	+4	13	Pot 2
10	G	(Uruguayan Football Association) Peñarol	6	4	0	2	12	5	+7	12	Pot 2
11	E	(Brazilian Football Confederation) Flamengo	6	3	1	2	11	4	+7	10	Pot 2
12	C	(Brazilian Football Confederation) Grêmio	6	3	1	2	7	5	+2	10	Pot 2
13	H	(Uruguayan Football Association) Nacional	6	3	1	2	8	7	+1	10	Pot 2
14	D	(Brazilian Football Confederation) Botafogo	6	3	1	2	7	6	+1	10	Pot 2
15	F	(Argentine Football Association) San Lorenzo	6	2	2	2	6	6	0	8	Pot 2
16	A	(Football Federation of Chile) Colo-Colo	6	1	3	2	4	5	−1	6	Pot 2

Source: CONMEBOL
Rules for classification: 1) Higher position in group; 2) Points; 3) Goal difference; 4) Goals scored; 5) Away goals scored; 6) CONMEBOL ranking (Regulations Article 2.4.2).

== Format ==
Starting from the round of 16, the teams played a single-elimination tournament with the following rules:

- In the round of 16, quarter-finals and semi-finals, each tie was played on a home-and-away two-legged basis, with the higher-seeded team hosting the second leg (Regulations Article 2.2.3.2). If tied on aggregate, extra time was not played, and a penalty shoot-out was used to determine the winners (Regulations Article 2.4.3).
- The final was played as a single match at a venue pre-selected by CONMEBOL, with the higher-seeded team designated as the "home" team for administrative purposes (Regulations Article 2.2.3.5). If tied after regulation, 30 minutes of extra time were played. If still tied after extra time, a penalty shoot-out was used to determine the winners (Regulations Article 2.4.4).

== Draw ==
The draw for the round of 16 was held on 3 June 2024, 12:00 PYT (UTC−4) in Asunción, Paraguay. For the round of 16, the 16 teams were drawn into eight ties (A–H) between a group winner (Pot 1) and a group runner-up (Pot 2), with the group winners hosting the second leg. Teams from the same association or the same group could be drawn into the same tie (Regulations Article 2.2.3.2).

== Bracket ==
The bracket starting from the round of 16 was determined as follows:

Round	Matchups
Round of 16	(Group winners host second leg, matchups decided by draw): Match A; Match B; Match C; Match D; Match E; Match F; Match G; Match H
Quarter-finals	(Higher-seeded team host second leg): Match S1: Winner A vs. Winner H; Match S2: Winner B vs. Winner G; Match S3: Winner C vs. Winner F; Match S4: Winner D vs. Winner E
Semi-finals	(Higher-seeded team host second leg): Match F1: Winner S1 vs. Winner S4; Match F2: Winner S2 vs. Winner S3
Final	(Higher-seeded team designated as "home" team): Winner F1 vs. Winner F2

The bracket was decided based on the round of 16 draw, which was held on 3 June 2024.

Round of 16
12	(Brazilian Football Confederation) Grêmio	2	1	3 (2)
4	(Brazilian Football Confederation) Fluminense (p)	1	2	3 (4)
15	(Argentine Football Association) San Lorenzo	1	0	1
2	(Brazilian Football Confederation) Atlético Mineiro	1	1	2
16	(Football Federation of Chile) Colo-Colo	1	2	3
7	(Colombian Football Federation) Junior	0	1	1
9	(Argentine Football Association) Talleres	0	1	1
1	(Argentine Football Association) River Plate	1	2	3
14	(Brazilian Football Confederation) Botafogo	2	2	4
3	(Brazilian Football Confederation) Palmeiras	1	2	3
13	(Uruguayan Football Association) Nacional	0	0	0
5	(Brazilian Football Confederation) São Paulo	0	2	2
11	(Brazilian Football Confederation) Flamengo	2	0	2
6	(Bolivian Football Federation) Bolívar	0	1	1
10	(Uruguayan Football Association) Peñarol	4	0	4
8	(Bolivian Football Federation) The Strongest	0	1	1

Quarter-finals
4	(Brazilian Football Confederation) Fluminense	1	0	1
2	(Brazilian Football Confederation) Atlético Mineiro	0	2	2
16	(Football Federation of Chile) Colo-Colo	1	0	1
1	(Argentine Football Association) River Plate	1	1	2
14	(Brazilian Football Confederation) Botafogo (p)	0	1	1 (5)
5	(Brazilian Football Confederation) São Paulo	0	1	1 (4)
11	(Brazilian Football Confederation) Flamengo	0	0	0
10	(Uruguayan Football Association) Peñarol	1	0	1

Semi-finals
2	(Brazilian Football Confederation) Atlético Mineiro	3	0	3
1	(Argentine Football Association) River Plate	0	0	0
14	(Brazilian Football Confederation) Botafogo	5	1	6
10	(Uruguayan Football Association) Peñarol	0	3	3

Final
30 November – Buenos Aires
2	(Brazilian Football Confederation) Atlético Mineiro	1
14	(Brazilian Football Confederation) Botafogo	3

== Round of 16 ==
=== Summary ===
The first legs were played on 13–15 August, and the second legs were played on 20–22 August 2024.

Team 1	Agg.	Team 2	1st leg	2nd leg
San Lorenzo (Argentina)	1–2	(Brazil) Atlético Mineiro	1–1	0–1
Nacional (Uruguay)	0–2	(Brazil) São Paulo	0–0	0–2
Flamengo (Brazil)	2–1	(Bolivia) Bolívar	2–0	0–1
Colo-Colo (Chile)	3–1	(Colombia) Junior	1–0	2–1
Talleres (Argentina)	1–3	(Argentina) River Plate	0–1	1–2
Peñarol (Uruguay)	4–1	(Bolivia) The Strongest	4–0	0–1
Botafogo (Brazil)	4–3	(Brazil) Palmeiras	2–1	2–2
Grêmio (Brazil)	3–3 (2–4 p)	(Brazil) Fluminense	2–1	1–2

=== Matches ===
13 August 2024
21:30 UTC−3

San Lorenzo (Argentine Football Association)	1–1	(Brazilian Football Confederation) Atlético Mineiro
Cuello 17'	Report	Paulinho 58'

Estadio Pedro Bidegain, Buenos Aires
Attendance: 18,108
Referee: Gustavo Tejera (Uruguay)
20 August 2024
21:30 UTC−3

Atlético Mineiro (Brazilian Football Confederation)	1–0	(Argentine Football Association) San Lorenzo
Battaglia 65'	Report

Arena MRV, Belo Horizonte
Referee: Felipe González (Chile)

Atlético Mineiro won 2–1 on aggregate and advanced to the quarter-finals (Match S1).

15 August 2024
19:00 UTC−3

Nacional (Uruguayan Football Association)	0–0	(Brazilian Football Confederation) São Paulo
	Report

Estadio Gran Parque Central, Montevideo
Attendance: 31,102
Referee: Facundo Tello (Argentina)
22 August 2024
19:00 UTC−3

São Paulo (Brazilian Football Confederation)	2–0	(Uruguayan Football Association) Nacional
Bobadilla 31'; Calleri 47'	Report

Estádio do Morumbi, São Paulo
Attendance: 60,032
Referee: Jhon Ospina (Colombia)

São Paulo won 2–0 on aggregate and advanced to the quarter-finals (Match S2).

15 August 2024
21:30 UTC−3

Flamengo (Brazilian Football Confederation)	2–0	(Bolivian Football Federation) Bolívar
Luiz Araújo 29'; Léo Pereira 89'	Report

Estádio do Maracanã, Rio de Janeiro
Attendance: 65,381
Referee: Wilmar Roldán (Colombia)
22 August 2024
20:30 UTC−4

Bolívar (Bolivian Football Federation)	1–0	(Brazilian Football Confederation) Flamengo
Bruno Sávio 57'	Report

Estadio Hernando Siles, La Paz
Attendance: 29,168
Referee: Yael Falcón Pérez (Argentina)

Flamengo won 2–1 on aggregate and advanced to the quarter-finals (Match S3).

13 August 2024
20:30 UTC−4

Colo-Colo (Football Federation of Chile)	1–0	(Colombian Football Federation) Junior
Pizarro 76'	Report

Estadio Monumental David Arellano, Santiago
Attendance: 39,048
Referee: Wilton Sampaio (Brazil)
20 August 2024
19:30 UTC−5

Junior (Colombian Football Federation)	1–2	(Football Federation of Chile) Colo-Colo
Bacca 45+1'	Report	Cepeda 43'; Falcón 74'

Estadio Metropolitano Roberto Meléndez, Barranquilla
Referee: Anderson Daronco (Brazil)

Colo-Colo won 3–1 on aggregate and advanced to the quarter-finals (Match S4).

14 August 2024
21:30 UTC−3

Talleres (Argentine Football Association)	0–1	(Argentine Football Association) River Plate
	Report	Díaz 86'

Estadio Mario Alberto Kempes, Córdoba
Attendance: 38,734
Referee: Andrés Rojas (Colombia)
21 August 2024
21:30 UTC−3

River Plate (Argentine Football Association)	2–1	(Argentine Football Association) Talleres
Borja 34'; Simón 50'	Report	Girotti 69'

Estadio Monumental, Buenos Aires
Referee: Gustavo Tejera (Uruguay)

River Plate won 3–1 on aggregate and advanced to the quarter-finals (Match S4).

14 August 2024
19:00 UTC−3

Peñarol (Uruguayan Football Association)	4–0	(Bolivian Football Federation) The Strongest
Fernández 9'; Silvera 16'; Báez 36'; Batista 72'	Report

Estadio Campeón del Siglo, Montevideo
Attendance: 32,235
Referee: Raphael Claus (Brazil)
21 August 2024
18:00 UTC−4

The Strongest (Bolivian Football Federation)	1–0	(Uruguayan Football Association) Peñarol
Triverio 44' (pen.)	Report

Estadio Hernando Siles, La Paz
Referee: Cristian Garay (Chile)

Peñarol won 4–1 on aggregate and advanced to the quarter-finals (Match S3).

14 August 2024
21:30 UTC−3

Botafogo (Brazilian Football Confederation)	2–1	(Brazilian Football Confederation) Palmeiras
Luiz Henrique 22'; Igor Jesus 39'	Report	Maurício 33'

Estádio Olímpico Nilton Santos, Rio de Janeiro
Attendance: 38,848
Referee: Esteban Ostojich (Uruguay)
21 August 2024
21:30 UTC−3

Palmeiras (Brazilian Football Confederation)	2–2	(Brazilian Football Confederation) Botafogo
López 86'; Rony 90'	Report	Igor Jesus 56'; Savarino 64'

Allianz Parque, São Paulo
Attendance: 40,269
Referee: Facundo Tello (Argentina)

Botafogo won 4–3 on aggregate and advanced to the quarter-finals (Match S2).

13 August 2024
19:00 UTC−3

Grêmio (Brazilian Football Confederation)	2–1	(Brazilian Football Confederation) Fluminense
Reinaldo 74' (pen.), 77'	Report	Lima 58'

Estádio Couto Pereira, Curitiba (Note: Grêmio played their round of 16 home match at Estádio Couto Pereira, Curitiba instead of their regular stadium Arena do Grêmio, Porto Alegre which was unavailable due to the impact of the 2024 Rio Grande do Sul floods.)
Attendance: 18,645
Referee: Darío Herrera (Argentina)
20 August 2024
19:00 UTC−3

Fluminense (Brazilian Football Confederation)	2–1	(Brazilian Football Confederation) Grêmio
Thiago Silva 14'; Arias 28' (pen.)	Report	Gustavo Nunes 76'
Penalties
Ganso (penalty missed); Thiago Silva (penalty scored); John Kennedy (penalty scored); Lima (penalty scored); Arias (penalty scored)	4–2	(penalty scored) Reinaldo; (penalty missed) Nathan; (penalty scored) Monsalve; (penalty missed) Cristaldo

Estádio do Maracanã, Rio de Janeiro
Attendance: 46,757
Referee: Andrés Matonte (Uruguay)

Tied 3–3 on aggregate, Fluminense won on penalties and advanced to the quarter-finals (Match S1).

== Quarter-finals ==
=== Summary ===
The first legs were played on 17–19 September, and the second legs were played on 24–26 September 2024.

Team 1	Agg.	Team 2	1st leg	2nd leg
Fluminense (Brazil)	1–2	(Brazil) Atlético Mineiro	1–0	0–2
Botafogo (Brazil)	1–1 (5–4 p)	(Brazil) São Paulo	0–0	1–1
Flamengo (Brazil)	0–1	(Uruguay) Peñarol	0–1	0–0
Colo-Colo (Chile)	1–2	(Argentina) River Plate	1–1	0–1

=== Matches ===
18 September 2024
19:00 UTC−3

Fluminense (Brazilian Football Confederation)	1–0	(Brazilian Football Confederation) Atlético Mineiro
Lima 87'	Report

Estádio do Maracanã, Rio de Janeiro
Attendance: 54,140
Referee: Facundo Tello (Argentina)
25 September 2024
19:00 UTC−3

Atlético Mineiro (Brazilian Football Confederation)	2–0	(Brazilian Football Confederation) Fluminense
Deyverson 50', 88'	Report

Arena MRV, Belo Horizonte
Attendance: 43,659
Referee: Wilmar Roldán (Colombia)

Atlético Mineiro won 2–1 on aggregate and advanced to the semi-finals (Match F1).

18 September 2024
21:30 UTC−3

Botafogo (Brazilian Football Confederation)	0–0	(Brazilian Football Confederation) São Paulo
	Report

Estádio Olímpico Nilton Santos, Rio de Janeiro
Attendance: 40,089
Referee: Esteban Ostojich (Uruguay)
25 September 2024
21:30 UTC−3

São Paulo (Brazilian Football Confederation)	1–1	(Brazilian Football Confederation) Botafogo
Calleri 87'	Report	Almada 15'
Penalties
Calleri (penalty missed); Luiz Gustavo (penalty scored); Lucas Moura (penalty scored); Araújo (penalty scored); Luciano (penalty scored); Rodrigo Nestor (penalty missed)	4–5	(penalty scored) Tchê Tchê; (penalty scored) Danilo; (penalty scored) Marçal; (penalty missed) Vitinho; (penalty scored) Almada; (penalty scored) Martins

Estádio do Morumbi, São Paulo
Attendance: 61,329
Referee: Darío Herrera (Argentina)

Tied 1–1 on aggregate, Botafogo won on penalties and advanced to the semi-finals (Match F2).

19 September 2024
19:00 UTC−3

Flamengo (Brazilian Football Confederation)	0–1	(Uruguayan Football Association) Peñarol
	Report	Cabrera 13'

Estádio do Maracanã, Rio de Janeiro
Attendance: 64,396
Referee: Jesús Valenzuela (Venezuela)
26 September 2024
19:00 UTC−3

Peñarol (Uruguayan Football Association)	0–0	(Brazilian Football Confederation) Flamengo
	Report

Estadio Campeón del Siglo, Montevideo
Attendance: 38,144
Referee: Facundo Tello (Argentina)

Peñarol won 1–0 on aggregate and advanced to the semi-finals (Match F2).

17 September 2024
21:30 UTC−3

Colo-Colo (Football Federation of Chile)	1–1	(Argentine Football Association) River Plate
Palacios 61'	Report	Pezzella 43'

Estadio Monumental David Arellano, Santiago
Attendance: 40,885
Referee: Raphael Claus (Brazil)
24 September 2024
21:30 UTC−3

River Plate (Argentine Football Association)	1–0	(Football Federation of Chile) Colo-Colo
Colidio 16'	Report

Estadio Monumental, Buenos Aires
Attendance: 67,195
Referee: Andrés Matonte (Uruguay)

River Plate won 2–1 on aggregate and advanced to the semi-finals (Match F1).

== Semi-finals ==
=== Summary ===
The first legs were played on 22 and 23 October, and the second legs were played on 29 and 30 October 2024.

Team 1	Agg.	Team 2	1st leg	2nd leg
Atlético Mineiro (Brazil)	3–0	(Argentina) River Plate	3–0	0–0
Botafogo (Brazil)	6–3	(Uruguay) Peñarol	5–0	1–3

=== Matches ===
22 October 2024
21:30 UTC−3

Atlético Mineiro (Brazilian Football Confederation)	3–0	(Argentine Football Association) River Plate
Deyverson 22', 70'; Paulinho 74'	Report

Arena MRV, Belo Horizonte
Attendance: 44,870
Referee: Jesús Valenzuela (Venezuela)
29 October 2024
21:30 UTC−3

River Plate (Argentine Football Association)	0–0	(Brazilian Football Confederation) Atlético Mineiro
	Report

Estadio Monumental, Buenos Aires
Attendance: 64,454
Referee: Wilmar Roldán (Colombia)

Atlético Mineiro won 3–0 on aggregate and advanced to the final.

23 October 2024
21:30 UTC−3

Botafogo (Brazilian Football Confederation)	5–0	(Uruguayan Football Association) Peñarol
Savarino 51', 59'; Barboza 55'; Luiz Henrique 73'; Igor Jesus 79'	Report

Estádio Olímpico Nilton Santos, Rio de Janeiro
Attendance: 42,982
Referee: Andrés Rojas (Colombia)
30 October 2024
21:30 UTC−3

Peñarol (Uruguayan Football Association)	3–1	(Brazilian Football Confederation) Botafogo
Báez 31', 66'; Batista 89'	Report	Almada 88'

Estadio Centenario, Montevideo (Note: The Peñarol v Botafogo match was moved from Peñarol's regular stadium Estadio Campeón del Siglo, Montevideo to Estadio Centenario, Montevideo on advice from the Uruguayan government.)
Attendance: 33,034
Referee: Piero Maza (Chile)

Botafogo won 6–3 on aggregate and advanced to the final.

== Final ==
The final was played on 30 November 2024 at Estadio Monumental in Buenos Aires, Argentina.

30 November 2024
17:00 UTC−3

Atlético Mineiro (Brazil)	1–3	(Brazil) Botafogo
Vargas 47'	Report	Luiz Henrique 35'; Telles 44' (pen.); Júnior Santos 90+7'

Estadio Monumental, Buenos Aires
Attendance: 69,803
Referee: Facundo Tello (Argentina)
