= 2024 Copa Libertadores final =

Final match of the 65th Copa Libertadores edition

- Promotional poster of the final
- Event: 2024 Copa Libertadores
Atlético Mineiro	Botafogo
(Brazil)	(Brazil)
1	3
- Date: 30 November 2024
- Venue: Estadio Monumental, Buenos Aires
- Man of the Match: Luiz Henrique
- Referee: Facundo Tello (Argentina)
- Attendance: 69,803

The 2024 Copa Libertadores final was the final match which decided the winner of the 2024 Copa Libertadores. This was the 65th edition of the Copa Libertadores, the top-tier South American continental club football tournament organized by CONMEBOL. The match was played by Brazilian sides Atlético Mineiro and Botafogo on 30 November 2024 at the Estadio Monumental in Buenos Aires, Argentina.

Botafogo defeated Atlético Mineiro in the match by a 3–1 score to win their first Copa Libertadores title. Luiz Henrique was elected MVP of the final and of the tournament. As winners of the competition, Botafogo qualified for the 2024 FIFA Intercontinental Cup, the 2025 FIFA Club World Cup and earned the right to play against the winners of the 2024 Copa Sudamericana in the 2025 Recopa Sudamericana. They also automatically qualified for the 2025 Copa Libertadores group stage.

== Venue ==
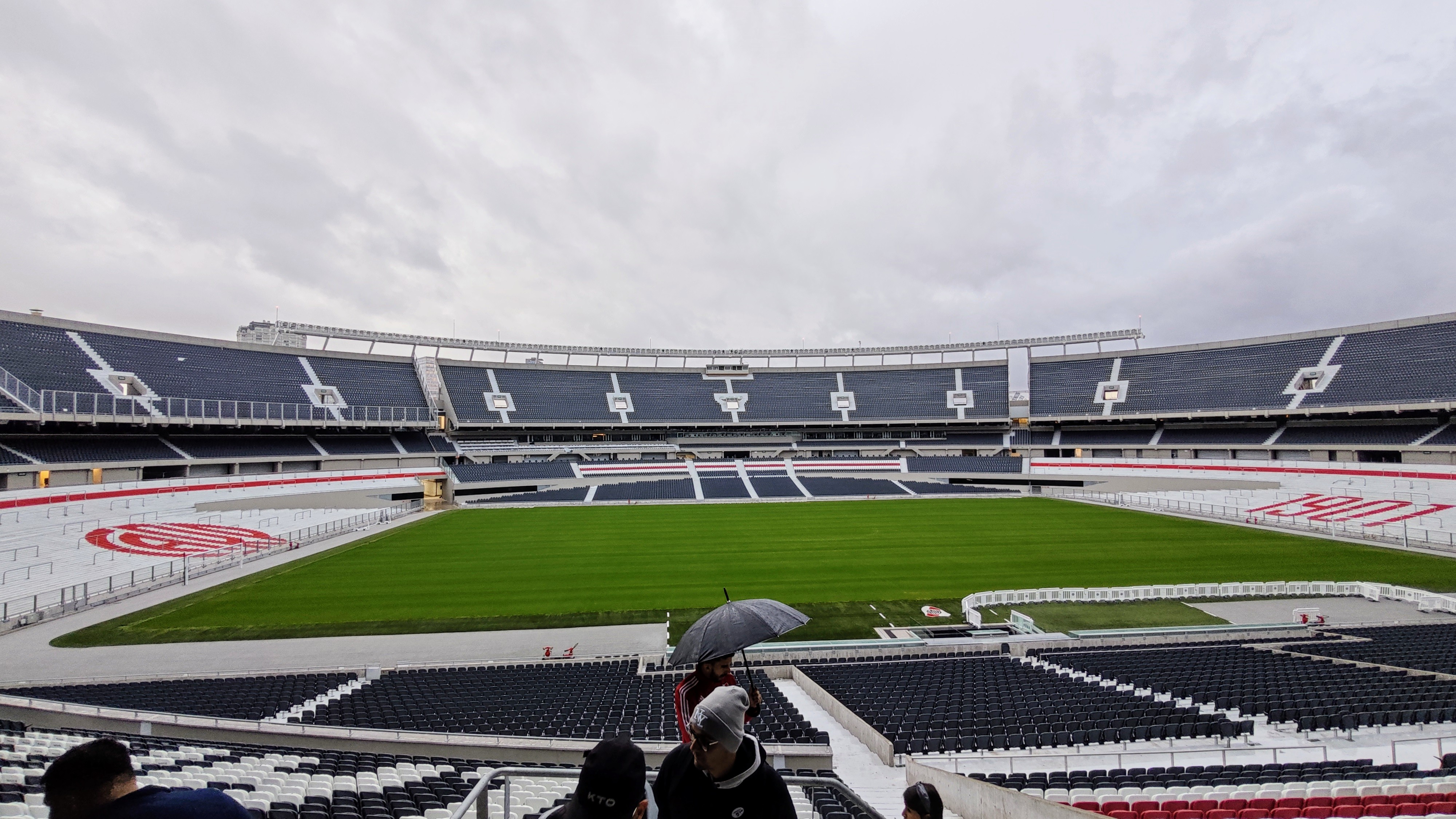
The Estadio Monumental in Buenos Aires hosted the final.

On 13 February 2024, the Argentine Football Association announced through its social media accounts that CONMEBOL had selected Buenos Aires as the host city for the final match of the 2024 Copa Libertadores, at a stadium to be confirmed. From 26 to 30 May 2024, a delegation from CONMEBOL visited three shortlisted stadiums to host the event: Estadio Monumental in Buenos Aires, Estadio Libertadores de América in Avellaneda, and Estadio Único Diego Armando Maradona in La Plata. The delegation evaluated technical aspects of the stadiums and visited potential training facilities and accommodation sites for the finalist teams.

On 4 October 2024, CONMEBOL confirmed Estadio Monumental as the venue for the final match. This was the first Copa Libertadores final hosted in Argentina since the finals have been played as single matches, as well as the eighth time that a Copa Libertadores final was played at the stadium.

== Teams ==
Team	Previous finals appearances (bold indicates winners)
(Brazil) Atlético Mineiro	1 (**2013**)
(Brazil) Botafogo	None

== Road to the final ==
Note: In all scores below, the score of the home team is given first.

(Brazil) Atlético Mineiro			Round	(Brazil) Botafogo		
Opponent	Venue	Score		Opponent	Venue	Score
Qualifying stages
Bye			Second stage	(Bolivia) Aurora (won 7–1 on aggregate)	Away	1–1
Bye			Second stage	(Bolivia) Aurora (won 7–1 on aggregate)	Home	6–0
Bye			Third stage	(Brazil) Red Bull Bragantino (won 3–2 on aggregate)	Home	2–1
Bye			Third stage	(Brazil) Red Bull Bragantino (won 3–2 on aggregate)	Away	1–1
**Group G**			Group stage	**Group D**		
(Venezuela) Caracas	Away	1–4	Group stage	(Colombia) Junior	Home	1–3
(Argentina) Rosario Central	Home	2–1	Group stage	(Ecuador) LDU Quito	Away	1–0
(Uruguay) Peñarol	Home	3–2	Group stage	(Peru) Universitario	Home	3–1
(Argentina) Rosario Central	Away	0–1	Group stage	(Ecuador) LDU Quito	Home	2–1
(Uruguay) Peñarol	Away	2–0	Group stage	(Peru) Universitario	Away	0–1
(Venezuela) Caracas	Home	4–0	Group stage	(Colombia) Junior	Away	0–0
Pos / Team / Pld / Pts; **1** / (Brazil) Atlético Mineiro / **6** / **15**; 2 / (Uruguay) Peñarol / 6 / **12**; 3 / (Argentina) Rosario Central / 6 / **7**; 4 / (Venezuela) Caracas / 6 / **1**; Source: CONMEBOL			Group stage	Pos / Team / Pld / Pts; 1 / (Colombia) Junior / 6 / **10**; **2** / (Brazil) Botafogo / **6** / **10**; 3 / (Ecuador) LDU Quito / 6 / **7**; 4 / (Peru) Universitario / 6 / **5**; Source: CONMEBOL		
**Seed 2**			Final stages	**Seed 14**		
(Argentina) San Lorenzo (won 2–1 on aggregate)	Away	1–1	Round of 16	(Brazil) Palmeiras (won 4–3 on aggregate)	Home	2–1
(Argentina) San Lorenzo (won 2–1 on aggregate)	Home	1–0	Round of 16	(Brazil) Palmeiras (won 4–3 on aggregate)	Away	2–2
(Brazil) Fluminense (won 2–1 on aggregate)	Away	1–0	Quarter-finals	(Brazil) São Paulo (tied 1–1 on aggregate, won on penalties)	Home	0–0
(Brazil) Fluminense (won 2–1 on aggregate)	Home	2–0	Quarter-finals	(Brazil) São Paulo (tied 1–1 on aggregate, won on penalties)	Away	1–1 (4–5 p)
(Argentina) River Plate (won 3–0 on aggregate)	Home	3–0	Semi-finals	(Uruguay) Peñarol (won 6–3 on aggregate)	Home	5–0
(Argentina) River Plate (won 3–0 on aggregate)	Away	0–0	Semi-finals	(Uruguay) Peñarol (won 6–3 on aggregate)	Away	3–1

== Format ==
The final was played as a single match at a pre-selected venue, with the higher-seeded team designated as the "home" team for administrative purposes. If scores were level after full time, 30 minutes of extra time would be played. If still tied after extra time, a penalty shoot-out would be used to determine the winner.

== Pre-match ==
=== Opening ceremony ===
On the opening ceremony before the kick-off, after a live music and dance performance, Djonga sang chants of Atlético Mineiro's fans and the club's anthem, and Marcelo Adnet did the same for Botafogo. The trophy of Copa Libertadores was brought to the pitch by Serbian tennis player Novak Djokovic.

== Match ==
Matías Zaracho (Atlético Mineiro) and Bastos (Botafogo) missed the final due to injuries, as well as Mateo Ponte (Botafogo), who was ruled out due to suspension.

=== First half ===
29 seconds into the match, Botafogo midfielder Gregore hit Fausto Vera on the head with the sole of his boot during a dispute for the ball in midfield, and received a straight red card. In the following minutes, Botafogo reorganized itself with ten men without its manager Artur Jorge making any substitutions, and handed the ball over to Atlético Mineiro, who only managed to pose any danger with two shots from afar by Hulk, defended by John. Afterwards, the Rio de Janeiro club loosened up, went on the attack, and in the 35th minute, a play by Thiago Almada resulted in a shot by Marlon Freitas that hit Junior Alonso in the penalty area, and its rebound reached Luiz Henrique, who finished with force and scored the first goal of the final. Less than ten minutes later, after a back pass to Atlético goalkeeper Éverson, Luiz Henrique pressed, overcame Guilherme Arana's marking and protected the ball until he reached the penalty area, when he was fouled by the goalkeeper and suffered a penalty, which was given after the referee's review using VAR. Alex Telles took a powerful cross shot with his left foot, displacing Éverson and making it 2-0 for Botafogo at the end of the first half.

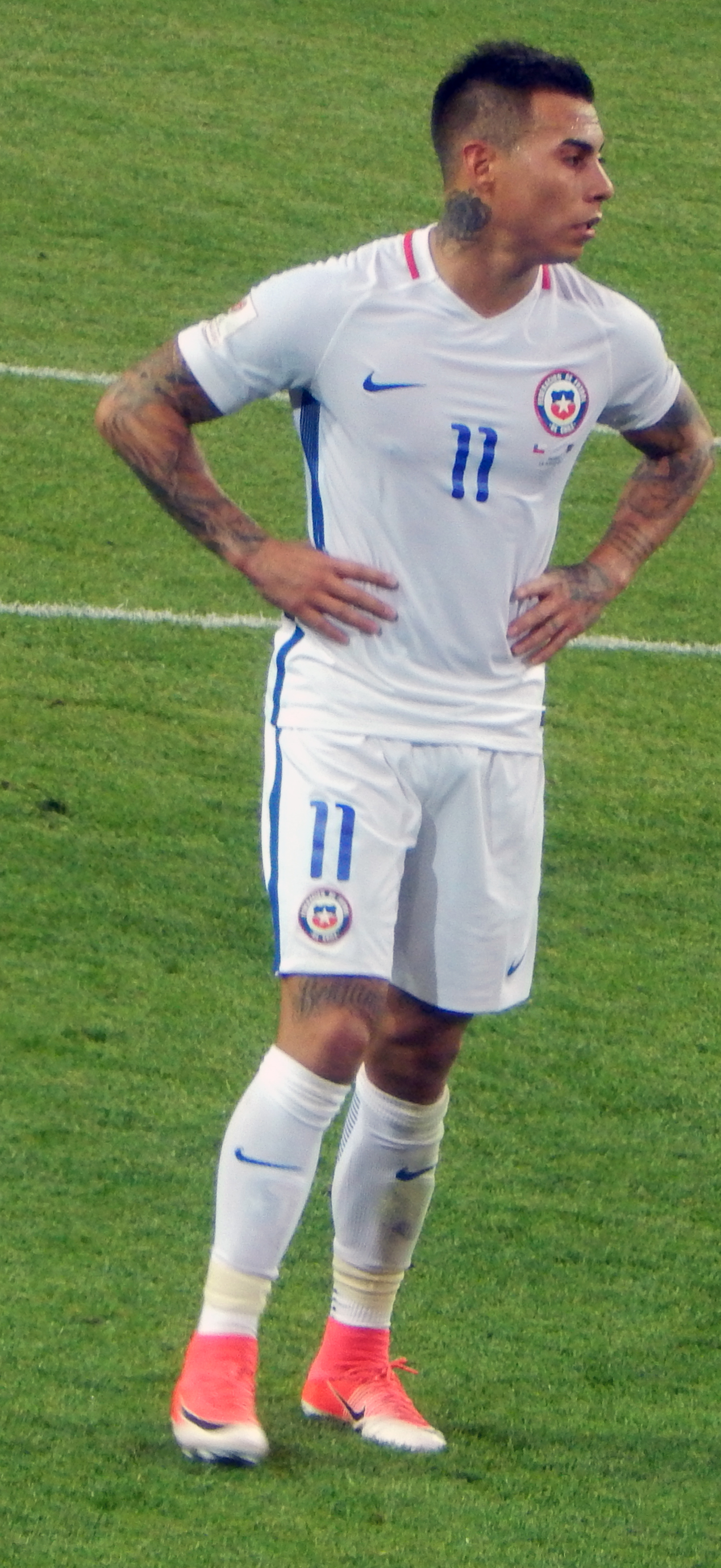
Eduardo Vargas scored for Atlético right after coming in at half-time, but later wasted two clear goal chances.

=== Second half ===
Atlético manager Gabriel Milito made substitutions at half-time and returned to the pitch with Bernard, Mariano and Eduardo Vargas, reorganizing his team's offensive structure. The changes soon took effect, when two minutes into the second half, a corner kick taken by Hulk found Vargas unmarked, and the Chilean striker headed the ball out of John's reach, scoring for the team from Minas Gerais. After the goal, Atlético insistently pressed Botafogo to seek an equalizer, but with little repertoire or effective alternatives even with an extra player. In the meanwhile, Artur Jorge reinforced the Rio de Janeiro side's marking with the entries of Danilo Barbosa and Marçal. The most dangerous plays of the Minas Gerais club came with Hulk on the right wing, and with Mariano passing to Vargas and Alan Kardec, who wasted chances in front of John. Vargas also missed another opportunity in the 88th minute, when he tried to lob the goalkeeper after a mistake by Adryelson. In the final minutes, Botafogo sought counterattacks with Júnior Santos amidst Atlético's pressure, and the strategy paid off when, in the 97th minute, he received a long kick on the right, dribbled past two Atlético players, tried to cross to Matheus Martins and got the rebound, pushing it into the empty goal and sealing both the victory of the team from Rio de Janeiro and his position as top scorer of the competition, with ten goals.

=== Details ===
30 November 2024
17:00 UTC−3

Atlético Mineiro (Brazil)	1–3	(Brazil) Botafogo
Vargas 47'	Report	Luiz Henrique 35'; Telles 44' (pen.); Júnior Santos 90+7'

Estadio Monumental, Buenos Aires
Attendance: 69,803
Referee: Facundo Tello (Argentina)

**Atlético Mineiro**	**Botafogo**

GK	22	(Brazil) Everson
CB	2	(Brazil) Lyanco	(yellow card) 45+1'	(substituted off) 46'
CB	21	(Argentina) Rodrigo Battaglia	(yellow card) 30'
CB	8	(Paraguay) Júnior Alonso
RM	7	(Brazil) Hulk (c)	(yellow card) 90+2'
CM	18	(Argentina) Fausto Vera	(yellow card) 45+2'	(substituted off) 46'
CM	23	(Ecuador) Alan Franco
LM	13	(Brazil) Guilherme Arana
AM	6	(Brazil) Gustavo Scarpa		(substituted off) 46'
AM	10	(Brazil) Paulinho
CF	9	(Brazil) Deyverson		(substituted off) 76'
Substitutes:
GK	31	(Brazil) Matheus Mendes
DF	3	(Brazil) Bruno Fuchs
DF	16	(Brazil) Igor Rabello
DF	25	(Brazil) Mariano		(substituted on) 46'
DF	26	(Argentina) Renzo Saravia
DF	44	(Brazil) Rubens
MF	5	(Brazil) Otávio
MF	17	(Brazil) Igor Gomes
MF	20	(Brazil) Bernard		(substituted on) 46'
MF	45	(Brazil) Alisson
FW	11	(Chile) Eduardo Vargas		(substituted on) 46'
FW	14	(Brazil) Alan Kardec		(substituted on) 76'
Manager:
(Argentina) Gabriel Milito

GK	12	(Brazil) John
RB	22	(Brazil) Vitinho	(yellow card) 90+4'
CB	34	(Brazil) Adryelson
CB	20	(Argentina) Alexander Barboza
LB	13	(Brazil) Alex Telles	(yellow card) 45+3'	(substituted off) 58'
DM	17	(Brazil) Marlon Freitas (c)
DM	26	(Brazil) Gregore	(red card) 2'
AM	18	(Argentina) Thiago Almada	(yellow card) 79'	(substituted off) 80'
AM	10	(Venezuela) Jefferson Savarino		(substituted off) 58'
SS	7	(Brazil) Luiz Henrique		(substituted off) 79'
CF	99	(Brazil) Igor Jesus		(substituted off) 90+3'
Substitutes:
GK	1	(Paraguay) Gatito Fernández
DF	3	(Brazil) Lucas Halter
DF	21	(Brazil) Marçal		(substituted on) 58'
DF	66	(Brazil) Cuiabano
MF	5	(Brazil) Danilo Barbosa		(substituted on) 58'
MF	6	(Brazil) Tchê Tchê
MF	28	(Brazil) Allan		(substituted on) 90+3'
MF	33	(Brazil) Eduardo
MF	70	(Paraguay) Óscar Romero
FW	9	(Brazil) Tiquinho Soares
FW	11	(Brazil) Júnior Santos	(yellow card) 90+9'	(substituted on) 80'
FW	37	(Brazil) Matheus Martins		(substituted on) 79'
Manager:
(Portugal) Artur Jorge

Assistant referees:
Ezequiel Brailovsky (Argentina)
Gabriel Chade (Argentina)
Fourth official:
Yael Falcón Pérez (Argentina)
Fifth official:
Cristian Navarro (Argentina)
Video assistant referee:
Mauro Vigliano (Argentina)
Assistant video assistant referees:
Christian Lescano (Ecuador)
Carlos Orbe (Ecuador)
Hernán Mastrángelo (Argentina)

**Match rules**
- 90 minutes.
- 30 minutes of extra time if necessary.
- Penalty shoot-out if scores still level.
- Twelve named substitutes.
- Maximum of five substitutions, with a sixth allowed in extra time.

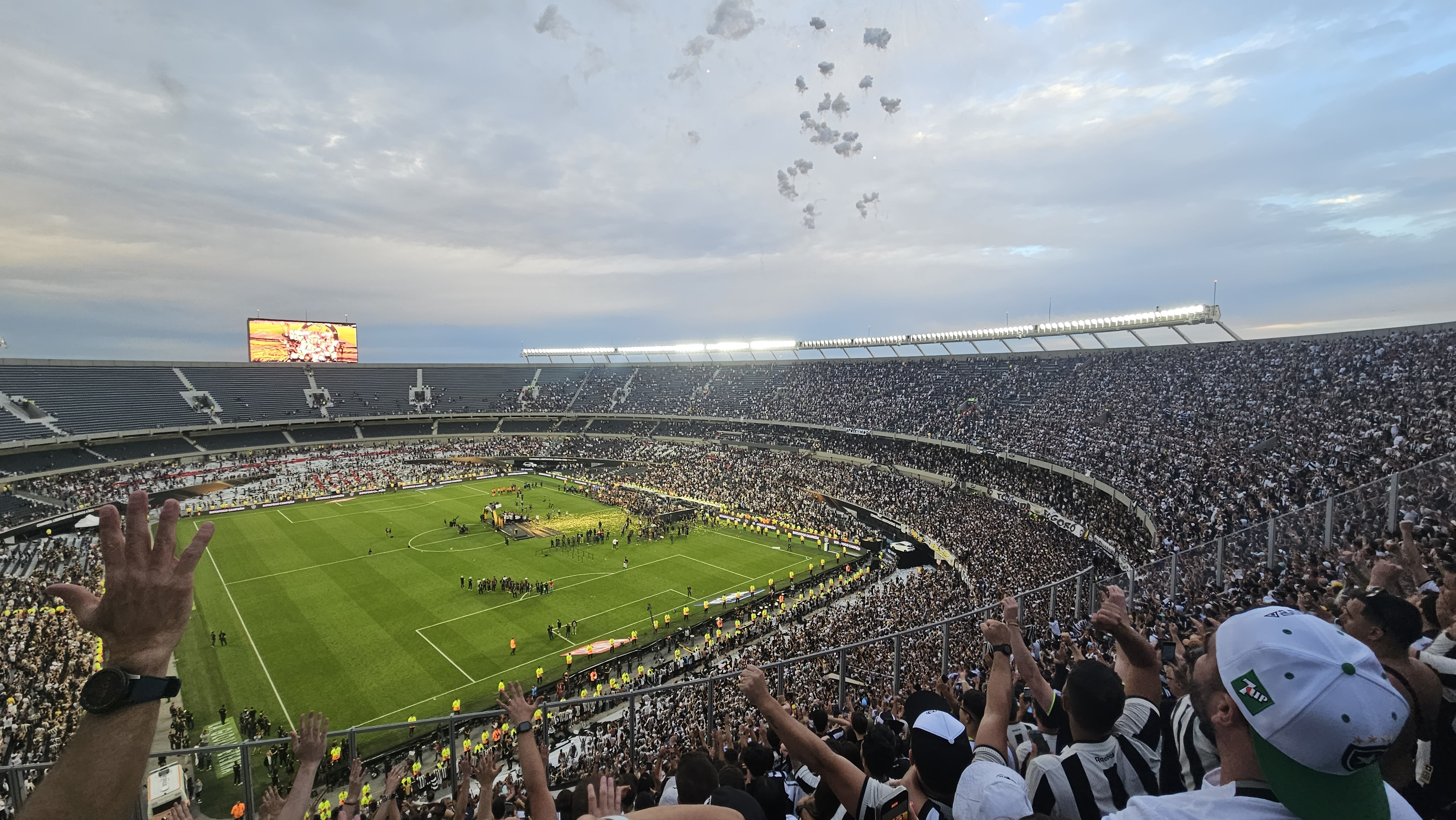
The Estadio Monumental after the final.

== See also ==
- 2024 Copa Sudamericana final
