= 2024 Copa Libertadores =

65th Copa Libertadores edition

Copa CONMEBOL Libertadores 2024
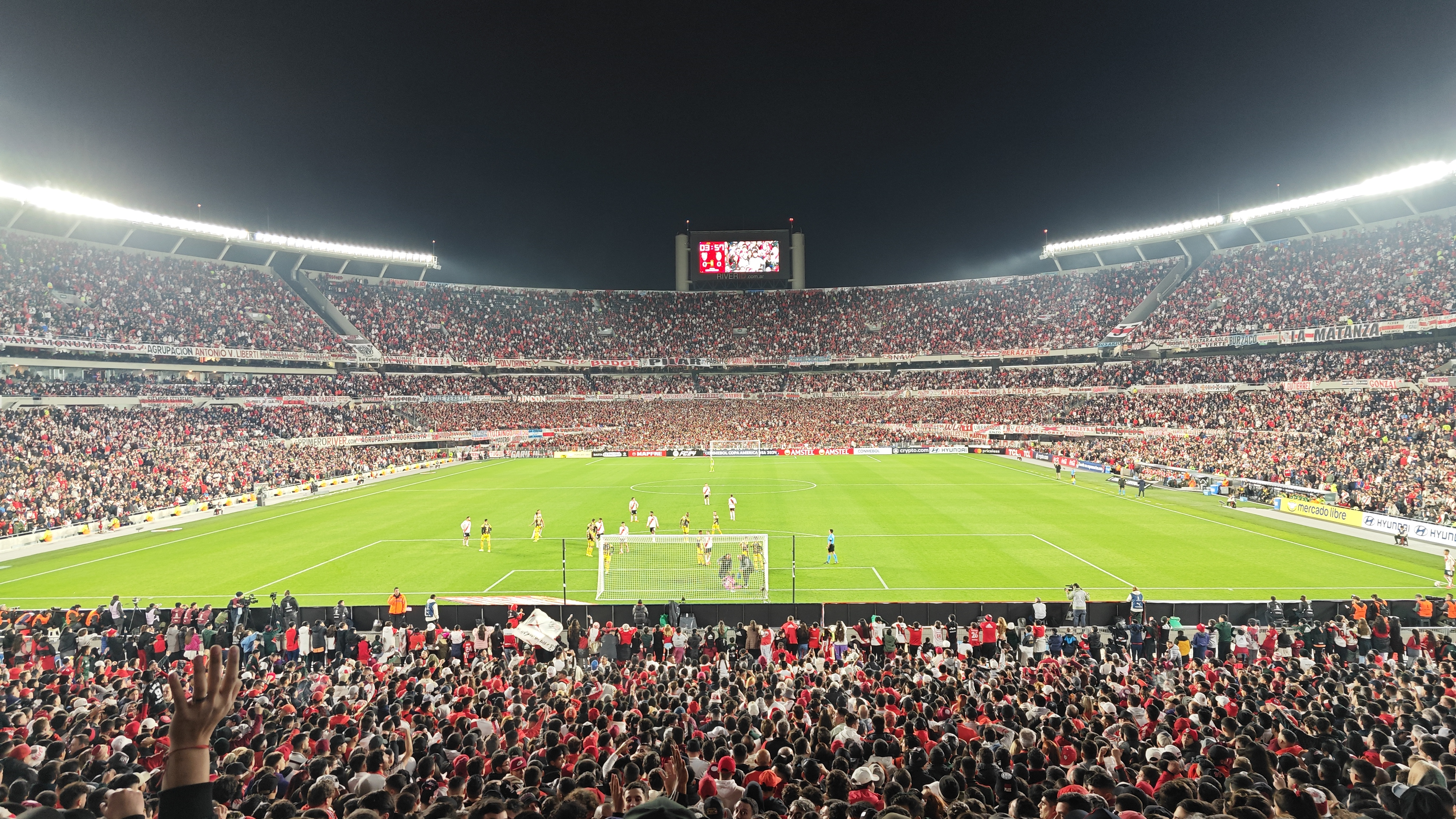
- The Estadio Monumental in Buenos Aires hosted the final

Tournament details
- Dates: 6 February – 30 November 2024
- Teams: 47 (from 10 associations)

Final positions
- Champions: (Brazil) Botafogo (1st title)
- Runners-up: (Brazil) Atlético Mineiro

Tournament statistics
- Matches played: 155
- Goals scored: 370 (2.39 per match)
- Attendance: 3,904,195 (25,188 per match)
- Top scorer: (Brazil) Júnior Santos (10 goals)
- Best player: (Brazil) Luiz Henrique

The 2024 Copa CONMEBOL Libertadores was the 65th edition of the CONMEBOL Libertadores (also referred to as the Copa Libertadores), South America's premier club football tournament organized by CONMEBOL. The competition began on 6 February and ended on 30 November 2024, with the final played at Estadio Monumental in Buenos Aires, Argentina.

Brazilian club Botafogo won their first Copa Libertadores title, defeating fellow Brazilian side Atlético Mineiro 3–1 in the final. As winners of the 2024 Copa Libertadores, Botafogo earned the right to play against the winners of the 2024 Copa Sudamericana in the 2025 Recopa Sudamericana. They also automatically qualified for the 2024 FIFA Intercontinental Cup, the 2025 FIFA Club World Cup and the 2025 Copa Libertadores group stage.

Fluminense were the defending champions, but were eliminated by Atlético Mineiro in the quarter-finals.

This edition was marred by the death of Juan Izquierdo, a Uruguayan footballer who was playing for Nacional, during a round of 16 match against São Paulo. Izquierdo collapsed on the pitch due to cardiac arrhythmia and died at the hospital five days after the incident.

== Teams ==
The following 47 teams from the 10 CONMEBOL member associations qualified for the tournament:

- Copa Libertadores champions
- Copa Sudamericana champions
- Brazil: 7 berths
- Argentina: 6 berths
- All other associations: 4 berths each

The entry stage was determined as follows:

- First stage: 6 teams
  - Teams which qualified for berth 4 from Bolivia, Ecuador, Paraguay, Peru, Uruguay and Venezuela
- Second stage: 13 teams
  - Teams which qualified for berths 6–7 from Brazil
  - Team which qualified for berth 6 from Argentina
  - Teams which qualified for berths 3–4 from Chile and Colombia
  - Teams which qualified for berth 3 from all other associations
- Group stage: 28 teams
  - Copa Libertadores champions
  - Copa Sudamericana champions
  - Teams which qualified for berths 1–5 from Argentina and Brazil
  - Teams which qualified for berths 1–2 from all other associations

Association	Team (Berth)	Entry stage	Qualification method
Argentina (6 berths)	River Plate (Argentina 1)	Group stage	2023 Liga Profesional de Fútbol champions
Argentina (6 berths)	Rosario Central (Argentina 2)	Group stage	2023 Copa de la Liga Profesional champions
Argentina (6 berths)	Estudiantes (Argentina 3)	Group stage	2023 Copa Argentina champions
Argentina (6 berths)	Talleres (Argentina 4)	Group stage	2023 Liga Profesional de Fútbol and Copa de la Liga Profesional aggregate table best team not yet qualified
Argentina (6 berths)	San Lorenzo (Argentina 5)	Group stage	2023 Liga Profesional de Fútbol and Copa de la Liga Profesional aggregate table 2nd best team not yet qualified
Argentina (6 berths)	Godoy Cruz (Argentina 6)	Second stage	2023 Liga Profesional de Fútbol and Copa de la Liga Profesional aggregate table 3rd best team not yet qualified
Bolivia (4 berths)	The Strongest (Bolivia 1)	Group stage	2023 División Profesional champions
Bolivia (4 berths)	Bolívar (Bolivia 2)	Group stage	2023 División Profesional and Copa de la División Profesional aggregate table best team not yet qualified
Bolivia (4 berths)	Always Ready (Bolivia 3)	Second stage	2023 División Profesional and Copa de la División Profesional aggregate table 2nd best team not yet qualified
Bolivia (4 berths)	Aurora (Bolivia 4)	First stage	2023 División Profesional and Copa de la División Profesional aggregate table 3rd best team not yet qualified
Brazil (7 + 1 berths)	Fluminense (Title holders)	Group stage	2023 Copa Libertadores champions
Brazil (7 + 1 berths)	São Paulo (Brazil 1)	Group stage	2023 Copa do Brasil champions
Brazil (7 + 1 berths)	Palmeiras (Brazil 2)	Group stage	2023 Campeonato Brasileiro Série A champions
Brazil (7 + 1 berths)	Grêmio (Brazil 3)	Group stage	2023 Campeonato Brasileiro Série A runners-up
Brazil (7 + 1 berths)	Atlético Mineiro (Brazil 4)	Group stage	2023 Campeonato Brasileiro Série A 3rd place
Brazil (7 + 1 berths)	Flamengo (Brazil 5)	Group stage	2023 Campeonato Brasileiro Série A 4th place
Brazil (7 + 1 berths)	Botafogo (Brazil 6)	Second stage	2023 Campeonato Brasileiro Série A 5th place
Brazil (7 + 1 berths)	Red Bull Bragantino (Brazil 7)	Second stage	2023 Campeonato Brasileiro Série A 6th place
Chile (4 berths)	Huachipato (Chile 1)	Group stage	2023 Campeonato Nacional champions
Chile (4 berths)	Cobresal (Chile 2)	Group stage	2023 Campeonato Nacional runners-up
Chile (4 berths)	Colo-Colo (Chile 3)	Second stage	2023 Campeonato Nacional 3rd place
Chile (4 berths)	Palestino (Chile 4)	Second stage	2023 Campeonato Nacional Primera División 4th place
Colombia (4 berths)	Millonarios (Colombia 1)	Group stage	2023 Apertura champions
Colombia (4 berths)	Junior (Colombia 2)	Group stage	2023 Finalización champions
Colombia (4 berths)	Águilas Doradas (Colombia 3)	Second stage	2023 Liga DIMAYOR aggregate table best team not yet qualified
Colombia (4 berths)	Atlético Nacional (Colombia 4)	Second stage	2023 Copa Colombia champions
Ecuador (4 + 1 berths)	LDU Quito (Copa Sudamericana)	Group stage	2023 Copa Sudamericana champions
Ecuador (4 + 1 berths)	Independiente del Valle (Ecuador 1)	Group stage	2023 Serie A runners-up
Ecuador (4 + 1 berths)	Barcelona (Ecuador 2)	Group stage	2023 Serie A aggregate table best team not yet qualified
Ecuador (4 + 1 berths)	El Nacional (Ecuador 3)	Second stage	2023 Serie A aggregate table 2nd best team not yet qualified
Ecuador (4 + 1 berths)	Aucas (Ecuador 4)	First stage	2023 Serie A aggregate table 3rd best team not yet qualified
Paraguay (4 berths)	Libertad (Paraguay 1)	Group stage	2023 Apertura and 2023 Clausura champions
Paraguay (4 berths)	Cerro Porteño (Paraguay 2)	Group stage	2023 División de Honor aggregate table best team not yet qualified
Paraguay (4 berths)	Sportivo Trinidense (Paraguay 3)	Second stage	2023 División de Honor aggregate table 2nd best team not yet qualified
Paraguay (4 berths)	Nacional (Paraguay 4)	First stage	2023 Copa Paraguay 3rd place
Peru (4 berths)	Universitario (Peru 1)	Group stage	2023 Liga 1 champions
Peru (4 berths)	Alianza Lima (Peru 2)	Group stage	2023 Liga 1 runners-up
Peru (4 berths)	Sporting Cristal (Peru 3)	Second stage	2023 Liga 1 3rd place
Peru (4 berths)	Melgar (Peru 4)	First stage	2023 Liga 1 4th place
Uruguay (4 berths)	Liverpool (Uruguay 1)	Group stage	2023 Campeonato Uruguayo champions
Uruguay (4 berths)	Peñarol (Uruguay 2)	Group stage	2023 Campeonato Uruguayo runners-up
Uruguay (4 berths)	Nacional (Uruguay 3)	Second stage	2023 Campeonato Uruguayo aggregate table best team not yet qualified
Uruguay (4 berths)	Defensor Sporting (Uruguay 4)	First stage	2023 Campeonato Uruguayo aggregate table 2nd best team not yet qualified
Venezuela (4 berths)	Deportivo Táchira (Venezuela 1)	Group stage	2023 Liga FUTVE champions
Venezuela (4 berths)	Caracas (Venezuela 2)	Group stage	2023 Liga FUTVE runners-up
Venezuela (4 berths)	Portuguesa (Venezuela 3)	Second stage	2023 Liga FUTVE 3rd place
Venezuela (4 berths)	Academia Puerto Cabello (Venezuela 4)	First stage	2023 Liga FUTVE 4th place

== Schedule ==
The schedule of the competition was as follows:

Schedule for 2024 Copa Libertadores
Stage	Draw date	First leg	Second leg
First stage	19 December 2023	6–8 February 2024	13–15 February 2024
Second stage	19 December 2023	20–22 February 2024	27–29 February 2024
Third stage	19 December 2023	5–7 March 2024	12–14 March 2024
Group stage	18 March 2024	Matchday 1: 2–4 April 2024; Matchday 2: 9–11 April 2024; Matchday 3: 23–25 April 2024; Matchday 4: 7–9 May 2024; Matchday 5: 14–16 May 2024; Matchday 6: 28–30 May 2024	
Round of 16	3 June 2024	13–15 August 2024	20–22 August 2024
Quarter-finals	3 June 2024	17–19 September 2024	24–26 September 2024
Semi-finals	3 June 2024	22–23 October 2024	29–30 October 2024
Final	3 June 2024	30 November 2024 at Estadio Monumental, Buenos Aires	

== Draws ==
Location of teams of the 2024 Copa Libertadores.
Brown: Group A; Red: Group B; Orange: Group C;
Yellow: Group D; Green: Group E; Blue: Group F;
Purple: Group G; Pink: Group H; White: Play-off rounds.

The draw for the qualifying stages was held on 19 December 2023, 12:00 PYST (UTC−3), at the CONMEBOL Convention Centre in Luque, Paraguay.

Teams were seeded by their CONMEBOL Clubs ranking as of 18 December 2023 (shown in parentheses), taking into account the following three factors:

1. Performance in the last 10 years, taking into account Copa Libertadores and Copa Sudamericana results in the period 2014–2023.
2. Historical coefficient, taking into account Copa Libertadores and Copa Sudamericana results in the period 1960–2013 and 2002–2013 respectively.
3. Local tournament champion, with bonus points awarded to domestic league champions of the last 10 years.

For the first stage, the six teams were drawn into three ties (E1–E3), with the teams from Pot 1 hosting the second leg.

First stage draw
Pot 1	Pot 2
(Peru) Melgar (44); (Uruguay) Defensor Sporting (66); (Paraguay) Nacional (84)	(Ecuador) Aucas (88); (Venezuela) Academia Puerto Cabello (162); (Bolivia) Aurora (243)

1. ^{†} The identity of the team Bolivia 4 was not known at the time the pots were announced and it was seeded in Pot 2.

For the second stage, the 16 teams were drawn into eight ties (C1–C8), with the teams from Pot 1 hosting the second leg. Teams from the same association could not be drawn into the same tie, excluding the three winners of the first stage, which were seeded in Pot 2 and whose identity was not known at the time of the draw, and could be drawn into the same tie with another team from the same association.

Second stage draw
Pot 1	Pot 2
(Uruguay) Nacional (5); (Colombia) Atlético Nacional (21); (Chile) Colo-Colo (26); (Peru) Sporting Cristal (34); (Brazil) Red Bull Bragantino (41); (Brazil) Botafogo (49); (Chile) Palestino (62); (Ecuador) El Nacional (68)	(Argentina) Godoy Cruz (72); (Bolivia) Always Ready (74); (Venezuela) Portuguesa (119); (Colombia) Águilas Doradas (187); (Paraguay) Sportivo Trinidense (No rank); First stage winner E1; First stage winner E2; First stage winner E3

For the third stage, the eight winners of the second stage were allocated without any draw into the following four ties (G1–G4), with the team in each tie with the higher CONMEBOL ranking hosting the second leg.

- Second stage winner C1 vs. Second stage winner C8
- Second stage winner C2 vs. Second stage winner C7
- Second stage winner C3 vs. Second stage winner C6
- Second stage winner C4 vs. Second stage winner C5

For the group stage, the 32 teams were drawn into eight groups (Groups A–H) of four containing a team from each of the four pots. Teams from the same association could not be drawn into the same group, excluding the four winners of the third stage, which were allocated to Pot 4 and could be drawn into the same group with another team from the same association.

Group stage draw
Pot 1	Pot 2	Pot 3	Pot 4
(Brazil) Fluminense (12); (Brazil) Palmeiras (1); (Argentina) River Plate (2); (Brazil) Flamengo (4); (Brazil) Grêmio (7); (Uruguay) Peñarol (8); (Brazil) São Paulo (9); (Ecuador) LDU Quito (13)	(Brazil) Atlético Mineiro (14); (Ecuador) Independiente del Valle (16); (Paraguay) Libertad (17); (Paraguay) Cerro Porteño (19); (Argentina) Estudiantes (23); (Ecuador) Barcelona (24); (Bolivia) Bolívar (27); (Colombia) Junior (31)	(Argentina) San Lorenzo (32); (Bolivia) The Strongest (38); (Peru) Universitario (42); (Venezuela) Deportivo Táchira (47); (Argentina) Rosario Central (50); (Peru) Alianza Lima (52); (Colombia) Millonarios (54); (Argentina) Talleres (58)	(Venezuela) Caracas (59); (Uruguay) Liverpool (103); (Chile) Huachipato (105); (Chile) Cobresal (154); (Brazil) Botafogo (49); (Chile) Palestino (62); (Uruguay) Nacional (5); (Chile) Colo-Colo (26)

Notes

1. ^{TH} The defending Copa Libertadores champions were automatically allocated to Group A and the position A1.
2. ^{CS} The defending Copa Sudamericana champions (normally seeded in Pot 2) were seeded in Pot 1 due to their CONMEBOL Clubs rank.
3. ^{Q3} The third stage winners were seeded in Pot 4.

The draw for the round of 16 was held on 3 June 2024, 12:00 PYT (UTC−4) in Asunción, Paraguay. For the round of 16, the 16 teams were drawn into eight ties (A–H) between a group winner (Pot 1) and a group runner-up (Pot 2), with the group winners hosting the second leg. Teams from the same association or the same group could be drawn into the same tie (Regulations Article 2.2.3.2).

== Qualifying stages ==
In the qualifying stages, each tie was played on a home-and-away two-legged basis. If tied on aggregate, extra time would not be played, and a penalty shoot-out would be used to determine the winner (Regulations Article 2.4.3). The qualifying stages were structured as follows:

- First stage (6 teams): The three winners of the first stage advanced to the second stage to join the 13 teams which were given byes to the second stage.
- Second stage (16 teams): The eight winners of the second stage advanced to the third stage.
- Third stage (8 teams): The four winners of the third stage advanced to the group stage to join the 28 direct entrants. The four teams eliminated in the third stage entered the Copa Sudamericana group stage.

=== First stage ===
Team 1	Agg.	Team 2	1st leg	2nd leg
Academia Puerto Cabello (Venezuela)	3–3 (4–2 p)	(Uruguay) Defensor Sporting	3–2	0–1
Aurora (Bolivia)	2–1	(Peru) Melgar	1–0	1–1
Aucas (Ecuador)	1–3	(Paraguay) Nacional	1–0	0–3

=== Second stage ===
Team 1	Agg.	Team 2	1st leg	2nd leg
Águilas Doradas (Colombia)	0–0 (3–4 p)	(Brazil) Red Bull Bragantino	0–0	0–0
Nacional (Paraguay)	4–0	(Colombia) Atlético Nacional	1–0	3–0
Always Ready (Bolivia)	7–4	(Peru) Sporting Cristal	6–1	1–3
Godoy Cruz (Argentina)	0–1	(Chile) Colo-Colo	0–1	0–0
Sportivo Trinidense (Paraguay)	2–1	(Ecuador) El Nacional	1–1	1–0
Academia Puerto Cabello (Venezuela)	0–4	(Uruguay) Nacional	0–2	0–2
Portuguesa (Venezuela)	2–4	(Chile) Palestino	1–2	1–2
Aurora (Bolivia)	1–7	(Brazil) Botafogo	1–1	0–6

=== Third stage ===
Team 1	Agg.	Team 2	1st leg	2nd leg
Botafogo (Brazil)	3–2	(Brazil) Red Bull Bragantino	2–1	1–1
Nacional (Paraguay)	3–3 (1–3 p)	(Chile) Palestino	0–2	3–1
Always Ready (Bolivia)	2–2 (4–5 p)	(Uruguay) Nacional	1–0	1–2
Sportivo Trinidense (Paraguay)	2–3	(Chile) Colo-Colo	1–1	1–2

== Group stage ==
In the group stage, each group was played on a home-and-away round-robin basis. The teams were ranked according to the following criteria: 1. Points (3 points for a win, 1 point for a draw, and 0 points for a loss); 2. Goal difference; 3. Goals scored; 4. Away goals scored; 5. CONMEBOL ranking (Regulations Article 2.4.2).

The winners and runners-up of each group advanced to the round of 16 of the final stages. The third-placed teams of each group entered the knockout round play-offs of the 2024 Copa Sudamericana.

=== Group A ===
Pos	Team	Pld	W	D	L	GF	GA	GD	Pts	Qualification	FLU	CCL	CCP	ALI
1	(Brazil) Fluminense	6	4	2	0	9	5	+4	14	Round of 16	—	2–1	2–1	3–2
2	(Chile) Colo-Colo	6	1	3	2	4	5	−1	6 (Note: Away goals scored: Colo-Colo 3, Cerro Porteño 2.)	Round of 16	0–1	—	1–0	0–0
3	(Paraguay) Cerro Porteño	6	1	3	2	4	5	−1	6	Copa Sudamericana	0–0	1–1	—	1–0
4	(Peru) Alianza Lima	6	0	4	2	5	7	−2	4		1–1	1–1	1–1	—

Source: CONMEBOL

=== Group B ===
Pos	Team	Pld	W	D	L	GF	GA	GD	Pts	Qualification	SPA	TAL	BSC	COB
1	(Brazil) São Paulo	6	4	1	1	10	3	+7	13	Round of 16	—	2–0	0–0	2–0
2	(Argentina) Talleres	6	4	1	1	10	6	+4	13	Round of 16	2–1	—	3–1	1–0
3	(Ecuador) Barcelona	6	1	3	2	6	9	−3	6	Copa Sudamericana	0–2	2–2	—	2–1
4	(Chile) Cobresal	6	0	1	5	3	11	−8	1		1–3	0–2	1–1	—

Source: CONMEBOL

=== Group C ===
Pos	Team	Pld	W	D	L	GF	GA	GD	Pts	Qualification	STR	GRE	HUA	EST
1	(Bolivia) The Strongest	6	3	1	2	8	6	+2	10	Round of 16	—	2–0	4–0	1–0
2	(Brazil) Grêmio	6	3	1	2	7	5	+2	10	Round of 16	4–0	—	0–2	1–1
3	(Chile) Huachipato	6	2	2	2	7	9	−2	8	Copa Sudamericana	0–0	0–1	—	1–1
4	(Argentina) Estudiantes	6	1	2	3	7	9	−2	5		2–1	0–1	3–4	—

Source: CONMEBOL

=== Group D ===
Pos	Team	Pld	W	D	L	GF	GA	GD	Pts	Qualification	JUN	BOT	LDQ	UNI
1	(Colombia) Junior	6	2	4	0	7	4	+3	10	Round of 16	—	0–0	1–1	1–1
2	(Brazil) Botafogo	6	3	1	2	7	6	+1	10	Round of 16	1–3	—	2–1	3–1
3	(Ecuador) LDU Quito	6	2	1	3	6	6	0	7	Copa Sudamericana	0–1	1–0	—	2–0
4	(Peru) Universitario	6	1	2	3	5	9	−4	5		1–1	0–1	2–1	—

Source: CONMEBOL

=== Group E ===
Pos	Team	Pld	W	D	L	GF	GA	GD	Pts	Qualification	BOL	FLA	PAL	MIL
1	(Bolivia) Bolívar	6	4	1	1	13	9	+4	13	Round of 16	—	2–1	3–1	3–2
2	(Brazil) Flamengo	6	3	1	2	11	4	+7	10	Round of 16	4–0	—	2–0	3–0
3	(Chile) Palestino	6	2	1	3	6	11	−5	7	Copa Sudamericana	0–4	1–0	—	3–1
4	(Colombia) Millonarios	6	0	3	3	6	12	−6	3		1–1	1–1	1–1	—

Source: CONMEBOL

=== Group F ===
Pos	Team	Pld	W	D	L	GF	GA	GD	Pts	Qualification	PAL	SLO	IDV	LIV
1	(Brazil) Palmeiras	6	4	2	0	14	5	+9	14	Round of 16	—	0–0	2–1	3–1
2	(Argentina) San Lorenzo	6	2	2	2	6	6	0	8	Round of 16	1–1	—	2–0	3–2
3	(Ecuador) Independiente del Valle	6	2	1	3	8	9	−1	7	Copa Sudamericana	2–3	2–0	—	2–1
4	(Uruguay) Liverpool	6	1	1	4	6	14	−8	4		0–5	1–0	1–1	—

Source: CONMEBOL

=== Group G ===
Pos	Team	Pld	W	D	L	GF	GA	GD	Pts	Qualification	CAM	PEÑ	ROS	CAR
1	(Brazil) Atlético Mineiro	6	5	0	1	14	6	+8	15	Round of 16	—	3–2	2–1	4–0
2	(Uruguay) Peñarol	6	4	0	2	12	5	+7	12	Round of 16	2–0	—	2–1	5–0
3	(Argentina) Rosario Central	6	2	1	3	8	7	+1	7	Copa Sudamericana	0–1	1–0	—	4–1
4	(Venezuela) Caracas	6	0	1	5	3	19	−16	1		1–4	0–1	1–1	—

Source: CONMEBOL

=== Group H ===
Pos	Team	Pld	W	D	L	GF	GA	GD	Pts	Qualification	RIV	NAC	LIB	TAC
1	(Argentina) River Plate	6	5	1	0	12	3	+9	16	Round of 16	—	2–0	2–0	2–0
2	(Uruguay) Nacional	6	3	1	2	8	7	+1	10	Round of 16	2–2	—	2–0	2–1
3	(Paraguay) Libertad	6	2	1	3	7	8	−1	7	Copa Sudamericana	1–2	2–1	—	3–0
4	(Venezuela) Deportivo Táchira	6	0	1	5	2	11	−9	1		0–2	0–1	1–1	—

Source: CONMEBOL

== Final stages ==
Starting from the round of 16, the teams played a single-elimination tournament with the following rules:

- In the round of 16, quarter-finals and semi-finals, each tie was played on a home-and-away two-legged basis, with the higher-seeded team hosting the second leg (Regulations Article 2.2.3.2). If tied on aggregate, extra time would not be played, and a penalty shoot-out would be used to determine the winners (Regulations Article 2.4.3).
- The final was played as a single match at a venue pre-selected by CONMEBOL, with the higher-seeded team designated as the "home" team for administrative purposes (Regulations Article 2.2.3.5). If tied after regulation, 30 minutes of extra time would be played. If still tied after extra time, a penalty shoot-out would be used to determine the winners (Regulations Article 2.4.4).

=== Qualified teams ===
The winners and runners-up of each of the eight groups in the group stage advanced to the round of 16.

Group	Winners	Runners-up
A	(Brazilian Football Confederation) Fluminense	(Football Federation of Chile) Colo-Colo
B	(Brazilian Football Confederation) São Paulo	(Argentine Football Association) Talleres
C	(Bolivian Football Federation) The Strongest	(Brazilian Football Confederation) Grêmio
D	(Colombian Football Federation) Junior	(Brazilian Football Confederation) Botafogo
E	(Bolivian Football Federation) Bolívar	(Brazilian Football Confederation) Flamengo
F	(Brazilian Football Confederation) Palmeiras	(Argentine Football Association) San Lorenzo
G	(Brazilian Football Confederation) Atlético Mineiro	(Uruguayan Football Association) Peñarol
H	(Argentine Football Association) River Plate	(Uruguayan Football Association) Nacional

=== Seeding ===
Starting from the round of 16, the teams were seeded according to their results in the group stage, with the group winners (Pot 1) seeded 1–8, and the group runners-up (Pot 2) seeded 9–16.

Seed	Grp	Team	Pld	W	D	L	GF	GA	GD	Pts	Round of 16 draw
1	H	(Argentine Football Association) River Plate	6	5	1	0	12	3	+9	16	Pot 1
2	G	(Brazilian Football Confederation) Atlético Mineiro	6	5	0	1	14	6	+8	15	Pot 1
3	F	(Brazilian Football Confederation) Palmeiras	6	4	2	0	14	5	+9	14	Pot 1
4	A	(Brazilian Football Confederation) Fluminense	6	4	2	0	9	5	+4	14	Pot 1
5	B	(Brazilian Football Confederation) São Paulo	6	4	1	1	10	3	+7	13	Pot 1
6	E	(Bolivian Football Federation) Bolívar	6	4	1	1	13	9	+4	13	Pot 1
7	D	(Colombian Football Federation) Junior	6	2	4	0	7	4	+3	10	Pot 1
8	C	(Bolivian Football Federation) The Strongest	6	3	1	2	8	6	+2	10	Pot 1
9	B	(Argentine Football Association) Talleres	6	4	1	1	10	6	+4	13	Pot 2
10	G	(Uruguayan Football Association) Peñarol	6	4	0	2	12	5	+7	12	Pot 2
11	E	(Brazilian Football Confederation) Flamengo	6	3	1	2	11	4	+7	10	Pot 2
12	C	(Brazilian Football Confederation) Grêmio	6	3	1	2	7	5	+2	10	Pot 2
13	H	(Uruguayan Football Association) Nacional	6	3	1	2	8	7	+1	10	Pot 2
14	D	(Brazilian Football Confederation) Botafogo	6	3	1	2	7	6	+1	10	Pot 2
15	F	(Argentine Football Association) San Lorenzo	6	2	2	2	6	6	0	8	Pot 2
16	A	(Football Federation of Chile) Colo-Colo	6	1	3	2	4	5	−1	6	Pot 2

Source: CONMEBOL
Rules for classification: 1) Higher position in group; 2) Points; 3) Goal difference; 4) Goals scored; 5) Away goals scored; 6) CONMEBOL ranking (Regulations Article 2.4.2).

=== Bracket ===
The bracket was decided based on the round of 16 draw, which was held on 3 June 2024.

Round of 16
12	(Brazilian Football Confederation) Grêmio	2	1	3 (2)
4	(Brazilian Football Confederation) Fluminense (p)	1	2	3 (4)
15	(Argentine Football Association) San Lorenzo	1	0	1
2	(Brazilian Football Confederation) Atlético Mineiro	1	1	2
16	(Football Federation of Chile) Colo-Colo	1	2	3
7	(Colombian Football Federation) Junior	0	1	1
9	(Argentine Football Association) Talleres	0	1	1
1	(Argentine Football Association) River Plate	1	2	3
14	(Brazilian Football Confederation) Botafogo	2	2	4
3	(Brazilian Football Confederation) Palmeiras	1	2	3
13	(Uruguayan Football Association) Nacional	0	0	0
5	(Brazilian Football Confederation) São Paulo	0	2	2
11	(Brazilian Football Confederation) Flamengo	2	0	2
6	(Bolivian Football Federation) Bolívar	0	1	1
10	(Uruguayan Football Association) Peñarol	4	0	4
8	(Bolivian Football Federation) The Strongest	0	1	1

Quarter-finals
4	(Brazilian Football Confederation) Fluminense	1	0	1
2	(Brazilian Football Confederation) Atlético Mineiro	0	2	2
16	(Football Federation of Chile) Colo-Colo	1	0	1
1	(Argentine Football Association) River Plate	1	1	2
14	(Brazilian Football Confederation) Botafogo (p)	0	1	1 (5)
5	(Brazilian Football Confederation) São Paulo	0	1	1 (4)
11	(Brazilian Football Confederation) Flamengo	0	0	0
10	(Uruguayan Football Association) Peñarol	1	0	1

Semi-finals
2	(Brazilian Football Confederation) Atlético Mineiro	3	0	3
1	(Argentine Football Association) River Plate	0	0	0
14	(Brazilian Football Confederation) Botafogo	5	1	6
10	(Uruguayan Football Association) Peñarol	0	3	3

Final
30 November – Buenos Aires
2	(Brazilian Football Confederation) Atlético Mineiro	1
14	(Brazilian Football Confederation) Botafogo	3

=== Round of 16 ===
Team 1	Agg.	Team 2	1st leg	2nd leg
San Lorenzo (Argentina)	1–2	(Brazil) Atlético Mineiro	1–1	0–1
Nacional (Uruguay)	0–2	(Brazil) São Paulo	0–0	0–2
Flamengo (Brazil)	2–1	(Bolivia) Bolívar	2–0	0–1
Colo-Colo (Chile)	3–1	(Colombia) Junior	1–0	2–1
Talleres (Argentina)	1–3	(Argentina) River Plate	0–1	1–2
Peñarol (Uruguay)	4–1	(Bolivia) The Strongest	4–0	0–1
Botafogo (Brazil)	4–3	(Brazil) Palmeiras	2–1	2–2
Grêmio (Brazil)	3–3 (2–4 p)	(Brazil) Fluminense	2–1	1–2

=== Quarter-finals ===
Team 1	Agg.	Team 2	1st leg	2nd leg
Fluminense (Brazil)	1–2	(Brazil) Atlético Mineiro	1–0	0–2
Botafogo (Brazil)	1–1 (5–4 p)	(Brazil) São Paulo	0–0	1–1
Flamengo (Brazil)	0–1	(Uruguay) Peñarol	0–1	0–0
Colo-Colo (Chile)	1–2	(Argentina) River Plate	1–1	0–1

=== Semi-finals ===
Team 1	Agg.	Team 2	1st leg	2nd leg
Atlético Mineiro (Brazil)	3–0	(Argentina) River Plate	3–0	0–0
Botafogo (Brazil)	6–3	(Uruguay) Peñarol	5–0	1–3

=== Final ===
30 November 2024
17:00 UTC−3

Atlético Mineiro (Brazil)	1–3	(Brazil) Botafogo
Vargas 47'	Report	Luiz Henrique 35'; Telles 44' (pen.); Júnior Santos 90+7'

Estadio Monumental, Buenos Aires
Attendance: 69,803
Referee: Facundo Tello (Argentina)

== Statistics ==
=== Top scorers ===
Rank	Player	Team	1Q1	1Q2	2Q1	2Q2	3Q1	3Q2	GS1	GS2	GS3	GS4	GS5	GS6	⅛F1	⅛F2	QF1	QF2	SF1	SF2	F	Total
1	(Brazil) Júnior Santos	(Brazil) Botafogo			1	4	2	1				1									1	10
2	(Brazil) Paulinho	(Brazil) Atlético Mineiro							2	1	1	1			1				1			7
3	(Uruguay) Maximiliano Silvera	(Uruguay) Peñarol								3	1		1		1							6
3	(Colombia) Miguel Borja	(Argentina) River Plate										1	2	2		1						6
5	(Brazil) Francisco da Costa	(Bolivia) Bolívar							2	1	1			1								5
5	(Argentina) Jonathan Calleri	(Brazil) São Paulo								1	1	1				1		1				5
5	(Brazil) Pedro	(Brazil) Flamengo							1	1			1	2								5
8	(Italy) Agustín Módica	(Argentina) Rosario Central									1		2	1								4
8	(Brazil) Bruno Sávio	(Bolivia) Bolívar							1	1	1					1						4
8	(Colombia) Carlos Bacca	(Colombia) Junior							2		1					1						4
8	(Brazil) Deyverson	(Brazil) Atlético Mineiro																2	2			4
8	(Paraguay) Diego Duarte	(Paraguay) Nacional		2	1			1														4
8	(Venezuela) Jefferson Savarino	(Brazil) Botafogo				1										1			2			4
8	(Uruguay) Martín Cauteruccio	(Peru) Sporting Cristal			1	3																4

Source: CONMEBOL

=== Team of the tournament ===
The CONMEBOL technical study group selected the following 11 players as the team of the tournament.

Position	Player	Team
Goalkeeper	(Brazil) John Victor	(Brazil) Botafogo
Defenders	(Argentina) Fabricio Bustos	(Argentina) River Plate
Defenders	(Argentina) Alexander Barboza	(Brazil) Botafogo
Defenders	(Argentina) Rodrigo Battaglia	(Brazil) Atlético Mineiro
Defenders	(Brazil) Alex Telles	(Brazil) Botafogo
Midfielders	(Brazil) Marlon Freitas	(Brazil) Botafogo
Midfielders	(Venezuela) Jefferson Savarino	(Brazil) Botafogo
Midfielders	(Uruguay) Leonardo Fernández	(Uruguay) Peñarol
Forwards	(Brazil) Luiz Henrique	(Brazil) Botafogo
Forwards	(Brazil) Igor Jesus	(Brazil) Botafogo
Forwards	(Argentina) Thiago Almada	(Brazil) Botafogo

== See also ==
- 2024 Copa Sudamericana
- 2024 Recopa Sudamericana
