= 2024 Copa Libertadores group stage =

Football tournament stage

The 2024 Copa Libertadores group stage was played from 2 April to 8 June 2024. A total of 32 teams competed in the group stage to decide the 16 places in the final stages of the 2024 Copa Libertadores.

== Draw ==
The draw for the group stage was held on 18 March 2024, 20:00 PYST (UTC−3), at the CONMEBOL Convention Centre in Luque, Paraguay.

Teams were seeded by their CONMEBOL Clubs ranking as of 18 December 2023 (shown in parentheses), taking into account the following three factors:

1. Performance in the last 10 years, taking into account Copa Libertadores and Copa Sudamericana results in the period 2014–2023.
2. Historical coefficient, taking into account Copa Libertadores and Copa Sudamericana results in the period 1960–2013 and 2002–2013 respectively.
3. Local tournament champion, with bonus points awarded to domestic league champions of the last 10 years.

For the group stage, the 32 teams were drawn into eight groups (Groups A–H) of four containing a team from each of the four pots. Teams from the same association could not be drawn into the same group, excluding the four winners of the third stage, which were allocated to Pot 4 and could be drawn into the same group with another team from the same association.

Group stage draw
Pot 1	Pot 2	Pot 3	Pot 4
(Brazil) Fluminense (12); (Brazil) Palmeiras (1); (Argentina) River Plate (2); (Brazil) Flamengo (4); (Brazil) Grêmio (7); (Uruguay) Peñarol (8); (Brazil) São Paulo (9); (Ecuador) LDU Quito (13)	(Brazil) Atlético Mineiro (14); (Ecuador) Independiente del Valle (16); (Paraguay) Libertad (17); (Paraguay) Cerro Porteño (19); (Argentina) Estudiantes (23); (Ecuador) Barcelona (24); (Bolivia) Bolívar (27); (Colombia) Junior (31)	(Argentina) San Lorenzo (32); (Bolivia) The Strongest (38); (Peru) Universitario (42); (Venezuela) Deportivo Táchira (47); (Argentina) Rosario Central (50); (Peru) Alianza Lima (52); (Colombia) Millonarios (54); (Argentina) Talleres (58)	(Venezuela) Caracas (59); (Uruguay) Liverpool (103); (Chile) Huachipato (105); (Chile) Cobresal (154); (Brazil) Botafogo (49); (Chile) Palestino (62); (Uruguay) Nacional (5); (Chile) Colo-Colo (26)

Notes

1. ^{TH} The defending Copa Libertadores champions were automatically allocated to Group A and the position A1.
2. ^{CS} The defending Copa Sudamericana champions (normally seeded in Pot 2) were seeded in Pot 1 due to their CONMEBOL Clubs rank.
3. ^{Q3} The third stage winners were seeded in Pot 4.

The following were the four winners of the third stage of qualifying which joined the 28 direct entrants in the group stage.

Match	Third stage winners
G1	(Brazil) Botafogo
G2	(Chile) Palestino
G3	(Uruguay) Nacional
G4	(Chile) Colo-Colo

== Format ==
In the group stage, each group was played on a home-and-away round-robin basis. The teams were ranked according to the following criteria: 1. Points (3 points for a win, 1 point for a draw, and 0 points for a loss); 2. Goal difference; 3. Goals scored; 4. Away goals scored; 5. CONMEBOL ranking (Regulations Article 2.4.2).

The winners and runners-up of each group advanced to the round of 16 of the final stages. The third-placed teams of each group entered the knockout round play-offs of the 2024 Copa Sudamericana.

== Schedule ==
The schedule of each matchday was as follows (Regulations Article 2.2.2).

Matchday	Dates	Matches
Matchday 1	2–4 April 2024	Team 4 vs. Team 2, Team 3 vs. Team 1
Matchday 2	9–11 April 2024	Team 2 vs. Team 3, Team 1 vs. Team 4
Matchday 3	23–25 April 2024	Team 2 vs. Team 1, Team 4 vs. Team 3
Matchday 4	7–9 May 2024 (Note: One match rescheduled to 4 June 2024.)	Team 3 vs. Team 2, Team 4 vs. Team 1
Matchday 5	14–16 May 2024 (Note: One match rescheduled to 8 June 2024.)	Team 1 vs. Team 2, Team 3 vs. Team 4
Matchday 6	28–30 May 2024	Team 1 vs. Team 3, Team 2 vs. Team 4

== Groups ==
=== Group A ===
Pos	Team	Pld	W	D	L	GF	GA	GD	Pts	Qualification	FLU	CCL	CCP	ALI
1	(Brazil) Fluminense	6	4	2	0	9	5	+4	14	Advance to round of 16	—	2–1	2–1	3–2
2	(Chile) Colo-Colo	6	1	3	2	4	5	−1	6 (Note: Away goals scored: Colo-Colo 3, Cerro Porteño 2.)	Advance to round of 16	0–1	—	1–0	0–0
3	(Paraguay) Cerro Porteño	6	1	3	2	4	5	−1	6	Transfer to Copa Sudamericana	0–0	1–1	—	1–0
4	(Peru) Alianza Lima	6	0	4	2	5	7	−2	4		1–1	1–1	1–1	—

Source: CONMEBOL
Notes:
3 April 2024
21:00 UTC−3

Colo-Colo (Chile)	1–0	(Paraguay) Cerro Porteño
Cepeda 90+4'	Report

Estadio Monumental David Arellano, Santiago
Attendance: 32,909
Referee: Facundo Tello (Argentina)
3 April 2024
19:30 UTC−5

Alianza Lima (Peru)	1–1	(Brazil) Fluminense
Serna 35'	Report	Marquinhos 72'

Estadio Alejandro Villanueva, Lima
Attendance: 19,779
Referee: Andrés Matonte (Uruguay)

9 April 2024
21:00 UTC−3

Fluminense (Brazil)	2–1	(Chile) Colo-Colo
Marquinhos 5'; Cano 52'	Report	Paiva 19'

Estádio do Maracanã, Rio de Janeiro
Attendance: 44,477
Referee: Jesús Valenzuela (Venezuela)
10 April 2024
18:00 UTC−4

Cerro Porteño (Paraguay)	1–0	(Peru) Alianza Lima
Carrizo 90+6'	Report

Estadio General Pablo Rojas, Asunción
Attendance: 17,624
Referee: Wilmar Roldán (Colombia)

23 April 2024
20:30 UTC−4

Colo-Colo (Chile)	0–0	(Peru) Alianza Lima
	Report

Estadio Monumental David Arellano, Santiago
Attendance: 39,886
Referee: Darío Herrera (Argentina)
25 April 2024
18:00 UTC−4

Cerro Porteño (Paraguay)	0–0	(Brazil) Fluminense
	Report

Estadio General Pablo Rojas, Asunción
Attendance: 26,365
Referee: Esteban Ostojich (Uruguay)

8 May 2024
19:00 UTC−5

Alianza Lima (Peru)	1–1	(Paraguay) Cerro Porteño
Barcos 80'	Report	Iturbe 26'

Estadio Alejandro Villanueva, Lima
Attendance: 21,681
Referee: Jesús Valenzuela (Venezuela)
9 May 2024
20:00 UTC−4

Colo-Colo (Chile)	0–1	(Brazil) Fluminense
	Report	Manoel 74'

Estadio Monumental David Arellano, Santiago
Attendance: 41,285
Referee: Wilmar Roldán (Colombia)

15 May 2024
19:00 UTC−5

Alianza Lima (Peru)	1–1	(Chile) Colo-Colo
Barcos 42'	Report	Vidal 78'

Estadio Alejandro Villanueva, Lima
Attendance: 25,949
Referee: Yael Falcón Pérez (Argentina)
16 May 2024
19:00 UTC−3

Fluminense (Brazil)	2–1	(Paraguay) Cerro Porteño
Marcelo 14'; Ganso 74'	Report	Viera 19'

Estádio do Maracanã, Rio de Janeiro
Attendance: 42,232
Referee: Darío Herrera (Argentina)

29 May 2024
21:30 UTC−3

Fluminense (Brazil)	3–2	(Peru) Alianza Lima
Keno 47'; Marcelo 52'; John Kennedy 81'	Report	Arregui 7'; Serna 50'

Estádio do Maracanã, Rio de Janeiro
Attendance: 38,404
Referee: Esteban Ostojich (Uruguay)
29 May 2024
20:30 UTC−4

Cerro Porteño (Paraguay)	1–1	(Chile) Colo-Colo
Carrizo 35'	Report	Palacios 23' (pen.)

Estadio General Pablo Rojas, Asunción
Attendance: 35,009
Referee: Wilmar Roldán (Colombia)

=== Group B ===
Pos	Team	Pld	W	D	L	GF	GA	GD	Pts	Qualification	SPA	TAL	BSC	COB
1	(Brazil) São Paulo	6	4	1	1	10	3	+7	13	Advance to round of 16	—	2–0	0–0	2–0
2	(Argentina) Talleres	6	4	1	1	10	6	+4	13	Advance to round of 16	2–1	—	3–1	1–0
3	(Ecuador) Barcelona	6	1	3	2	6	9	−3	6	Transfer to Copa Sudamericana	0–2	2–2	—	2–1
4	(Chile) Cobresal	6	0	1	5	3	11	−8	1		1–3	0–2	1–1	—

Source: CONMEBOL
2 April 2024
19:00 UTC−3

Cobresal (Chile)	1–1	(Ecuador) Barcelona
Valencia 90+1' (pen.)	Report	Fydriszewski 52' (pen.)

Estadio Zorros del Desierto, Calama (Note: Cobresal played their home matches at Estadio Zorros del Desierto, Calama instead of their regular stadium Estadio El Cobre, El Salvador which did not meet CONMEBOL requirements.)
Attendance: 1,582
Referee: Roberto Pérez (Peru)
4 April 2024
21:00 UTC−3

Talleres (Argentina)	2–1	(Brazil) São Paulo
Ruiz Rodríguez 45+6'; Botta 53'	Report	Luciano 66'

Estadio Mario Alberto Kempes, Córdoba
Attendance: 35,568
Referee: Alexis Herrera (Venezuela)

10 April 2024
21:30 UTC−3

São Paulo (Brazil)	2–0	(Chile) Cobresal
André Silva 82'; Calleri 88'	Report

Estádio do Morumbi, São Paulo
Attendance: 49,502
Referee: Carlos Ortega (Colombia)
10 April 2024
21:00 UTC−5

Barcelona (Ecuador)	2–2	(Argentina) Talleres
Díaz 28', 57' (pen.)	Report	Girotti 45'; Rodríguez 90+6'

Estadio Monumental Isidro Romero Carbo, Guayaquil
Attendance: 17,867
Referee: Esteban Ostojich (Uruguay)

25 April 2024
18:00 UTC−4

Cobresal (Chile)	0–2	(Argentina) Talleres
	Report	Mantilla 19'; Sosa 28'

Estadio Zorros del Desierto, Calama
Attendance: 2,696
Referee: Ivo Méndez (Bolivia)
25 April 2024
19:00 UTC−5

Barcelona (Ecuador)	0–2	(Brazil) São Paulo
	Report	Calleri 17'; Alisson 64'

Estadio Monumental Isidro Romero Carbo, Guayaquil
Attendance: 20,581
Referee: Juan Benítez (Paraguay)

8 May 2024
19:00 UTC−3

Talleres (Argentina)	3–1	(Ecuador) Barcelona
Catalán 12'; Botta 25'; Bou 90+4'	Report	Rojas 61'

Estadio Mario Alberto Kempes, Córdoba
Attendance: 35,567
Referee: Gustavo Tejera (Uruguay)
8 May 2024
20:30 UTC−4

Cobresal (Chile)	1–3	(Brazil) São Paulo
Coelho 23'	Report	Luciano 38'; Rodrigo Nestor 60'; Calleri 78'

Estadio Zorros del Desierto, Calama
Attendance: 3,029
Referee: Juan López (Paraguay)

14 May 2024
19:00 UTC−3

Talleres (Argentina)	1–0	(Chile) Cobresal
Girotti 82'	Report

Estadio Mario Alberto Kempes, Córdoba
Attendance: 35,586
Referee: Augusto Menéndez (Peru)
16 May 2024
21:00 UTC−3

São Paulo (Brazil)	0–0	(Ecuador) Barcelona
	Report

Estádio do Morumbi, São Paulo
Attendance: 50,516
Referee: Kevin Ortega (Peru)

29 May 2024
21:30 UTC−3

São Paulo (Brazil)	2–0	(Argentina) Talleres
Lucas Moura 45+4' (pen.); Luciano 90'	Report

Estádio do Morumbi, São Paulo
Attendance: 56,162
Referee: Jhon Ospina (Colombia)
29 May 2024
19:30 UTC−5

Barcelona (Ecuador)	2–1	(Chile) Cobresal
Fydriszewski 9'; Díaz 18'	Report	Coelho 71'

Estadio Monumental Isidro Romero Carbo, Guayaquil
Attendance: 2,247
Referee: Joel Alarcón (Peru)

=== Group C ===
Pos	Team	Pld	W	D	L	GF	GA	GD	Pts	Qualification	STR	GRE	HUA	EST
1	(Bolivia) The Strongest	6	3	1	2	8	6	+2	10	Advance to round of 16	—	2–0	4–0	1–0
2	(Brazil) Grêmio	6	3	1	2	7	5	+2	10	Advance to round of 16	4–0	—	0–2	1–1
3	(Chile) Huachipato	6	2	2	2	7	9	−2	8	Transfer to Copa Sudamericana	0–0	0–1	—	1–1
4	(Argentina) Estudiantes	6	1	2	3	7	9	−2	5		2–1	0–1	3–4	—

Source: CONMEBOL
2 April 2024
20:00 UTC−4

The Strongest (Bolivia)	2–0	(Brazil) Grêmio
Ursino 16'; Triverio 73'	Report

Estadio Hernando Siles, La Paz
Attendance: 10,782
Referee: Juan Benítez (Paraguay)
3 April 2024
19:00 UTC−3

Huachipato (Chile)	1–1	(Argentina) Estudiantes
C. Martínez 81'	Report	Correa 42'

Estadio Huachipato-CAP Acero, Talcahuano
Attendance: 4,188
Referee: Augusto Aragón (Ecuador)

9 April 2024
19:00 UTC−3

Estudiantes (Argentina)	2–1	(Bolivia) The Strongest
Carrillo 65'; Cetré 81'	Report	Triverio 21'

Estadio Jorge Luis Hirschi, La Plata
Attendance: 20,358
Referee: Nicolás Gallo (Colombia)
9 April 2024
19:00 UTC−3

Grêmio (Brazil)	0–2	(Chile) Huachipato
	Report	Loyola 13'; Montes 45+6'

Arena do Grêmio, Porto Alegre
Attendance: 35,468
Referee: Leodán González (Uruguay)

23 April 2024
19:00 UTC−3

Estudiantes (Argentina)	0–1	(Brazil) Grêmio
	Report	Nathan Fernandes 75'

Estadio Jorge Luis Hirschi, La Plata
Attendance: 22,065
Referee: Gustavo Tejera (Uruguay)
24 April 2024
18:00 UTC−4

Huachipato (Chile)	0–0	(Bolivia) The Strongest
	Report

Estadio Huachipato-CAP Acero, Talcahuano
Attendance: 3,611
Referee: Andrés Matonte (Uruguay)

9 May 2024
20:00 UTC−4

The Strongest (Bolivia)	1–0	(Argentina) Estudiantes
Ursino 13'	Report

Estadio Hernando Siles, La Paz
Attendance: 12,773
Referee: Roberto Pérez (Peru)

15 May 2024
18:00 UTC−4

The Strongest (Bolivia)	4–0	(Chile) Huachipato
Ramallo 35'; Ortega 61'; Quiroga 71'; Angulo 90+1' (pen.)	Report

Estadio Hernando Siles, La Paz
Attendance: 11,703
Referee: Gustavo Tejera (Uruguay)

29 May 2024
19:00 UTC−3

Grêmio (Brazil)	4–0	(Bolivia) The Strongest
Soteldo 14'; João Pedro 50'; Everton Galdino 67'; Gustavo Nunes 89'	Report

Estádio Couto Pereira, Curitiba (Note: Grêmio's home matches against The Strongest and Estudiantes were moved from their regular stadium Arena do Grêmio, Porto Alegre to Estádio Couto Pereira, Curitiba due to the impact of the 2024 Rio Grande do Sul floods.)
Attendance: 23,107
Referee: Andrés Matonte (Uruguay)
29 May 2024
19:00 UTC−3

Estudiantes (Argentina)	3–4	(Chile) Huachipato
Correa 12', 49'; Ascacíbar 63'	Report	Rodríguez 37'; Romero 45+1' (o.g.); M. Gutiérrez 51'; Villanueva 90+5'

Estadio Jorge Luis Hirschi, La Plata
Attendance: 18,564
Referee: Andrés Rojas (Colombia)

4 June 2024 (Note: The Huachipato v Grêmio match (originally scheduled for 8 May, 18:00 local time) and the Grêmio v Estudiantes match (originally scheduled for 15 May, 19:00 local time) were postponed to 4 and 8 June, respectively, due to the 2024 Rio Grande do Sul floods.)
20:00 UTC−4

Huachipato (Chile)	0–1	(Brazil) Grêmio
	Report	Diego Costa 6'

Estadio Huachipato-CAP Acero, Talcahuano
Attendance: 4,520
Referee: Jhon Ospina (Colombia)

8 June 2024
19:00 UTC−3

Grêmio (Brazil)	1–1	(Argentina) Estudiantes
Cristaldo 48'	Report	Méndez 83'

Estádio Couto Pereira, Curitiba
Attendance: 32,472
Referee: Esteban Ostojich (Uruguay)

=== Group D ===
Pos	Team	Pld	W	D	L	GF	GA	GD	Pts	Qualification	JUN	BOT	LDQ	UNI
1	(Colombia) Junior	6	2	4	0	7	4	+3	10	Advance to round of 16	—	0–0	1–1	1–1
2	(Brazil) Botafogo	6	3	1	2	7	6	+1	10	Advance to round of 16	1–3	—	2–1	3–1
3	(Ecuador) LDU Quito	6	2	1	3	6	6	0	7	Transfer to Copa Sudamericana	0–1	1–0	—	2–0
4	(Peru) Universitario	6	1	2	3	5	9	−4	5		1–1	0–1	2–1	—

Source: CONMEBOL
2 April 2024
21:00 UTC−5

Universitario (Peru)	2–1	(Ecuador) LDU Quito
Rivera 50', 70'	Report	Quiñónez 29'

Estadio Monumental, Lima
Attendance: 47,086
Referee: Esteban Ostojich (Uruguay)
3 April 2024
19:00 UTC−3

Botafogo (Brazil)	1–3	(Colombia) Junior
Hugo 43'	Report	Bacca 13' (pen.), 41'; Fuentes 28'

Estádio Olímpico Nilton Santos, Rio de Janeiro
Attendance: 39,039
Referee: Cristian Garay (Chile)

9 April 2024
21:00 UTC−5

Junior (Colombia)	1–1	(Peru) Universitario
Caicedo 44'	Report	Corzo 22'

Estadio Metropolitano Roberto Meléndez, Barranquilla
Attendance: 27,518
Referee: Leandro Rey Hilfer (Argentina)
11 April 2024
17:00 UTC−5

LDU Quito (Ecuador)	1–0	(Brazil) Botafogo
Alzugaray 4'	Report

Estadio Rodrigo Paz Delgado, Quito
Attendance: 16,008
Referee: Andrés Matonte (Uruguay)

23 April 2024
21:00 UTC−5

Junior (Colombia)	1–1	(Ecuador) LDU Quito
Bacca 12' (pen.)	Report	Arce 45' (pen.)

Estadio Metropolitano Roberto Meléndez, Barranquilla
Referee: Facundo Tello (Argentina)
24 April 2024
19:00 UTC−3

Botafogo (Brazil)	3–1	(Peru) Universitario
Carlos Eduardo 47', 90+2'; Luiz Henrique 57'	Report	Olivares 90+4'

Estádio Olímpico Nilton Santos, Rio de Janeiro
Attendance: 23,800
Referee: Jesús Valenzuela (Venezuela)

7 May 2024
21:00 UTC−5

Universitario (Peru)	1–1	(Colombia) Junior
Flores 24'	Report	Castrillón 5'

Estadio Monumental, Lima
Attendance: 59,000
Referee: Alexis Herrera (Venezuela)
8 May 2024
21:30 UTC−3

Botafogo (Brazil)	2–1	(Ecuador) LDU Quito
Hugo 31'; Júnior Santos 69'	Report	Estrada 45+1'

Estádio Olímpico Nilton Santos, Rio de Janeiro
Attendance: 26,464
Referee: Darío Herrera (Argentina)

14 May 2024
17:00 UTC−5

LDU Quito (Ecuador)	0–1	(Colombia) Junior
	Report	Enamorado 37'

Estadio Rodrigo Paz Delgado, Quito
Attendance: 14,541
Referee: Esteban Ostojich (Uruguay)
16 May 2024
17:00 UTC−5 (Note: The Universitario v Botafogo match, originally scheduled for 16 May 2024, 21:00 local time, was rescheduled to 17:00 local time per request from the Brazilian TV broadcaster.)

Universitario (Peru)	0–1	(Brazil) Botafogo
	Report	Jeffinho 77'

Estadio Monumental, Lima
Attendance: 53,242
Referee: Cristian Garay (Chile)

28 May 2024
17:00 UTC−5

LDU Quito (Ecuador)	2–0	(Peru) Universitario
Arce 44'; Alzugaray 67'	Report

Estadio Rodrigo Paz Delgado, Quito
Attendance: 12,340
Referee: Darío Herrera (Argentina)
28 May 2024
17:00 UTC−5

Junior (Colombia)	0–0	(Brazil) Botafogo
	Report

Estadio Metropolitano Roberto Meléndez, Barranquilla
Attendance: 16,189
Referee: Jesús Valenzuela (Venezuela)

=== Group E ===
Pos	Team	Pld	W	D	L	GF	GA	GD	Pts	Qualification	BOL	FLA	PAL	MIL
1	(Bolivia) Bolívar	6	4	1	1	13	9	+4	13	Advance to round of 16	—	2–1	3–1	3–2
2	(Brazil) Flamengo	6	3	1	2	11	4	+7	10	Advance to round of 16	4–0	—	2–0	3–0
3	(Chile) Palestino	6	2	1	3	6	11	−5	7	Transfer to Copa Sudamericana	0–4	1–0	—	3–1
4	(Colombia) Millonarios	6	0	3	3	6	12	−6	3		1–1	1–1	1–1	—

Source: CONMEBOL
2 April 2024
17:00 UTC−5

Millonarios (Colombia)	1–1	(Brazil) Flamengo
Ruiz 80'	Report	Pedro 64' (pen.)

Estadio El Campín, Bogotá
Attendance: 22,205
Referee: Darío Herrera (Argentina)
4 April 2024
21:00 UTC−3

Palestino (Chile)	0–4	(Bolivia) Bolívar
	Report	Da Costa 27' (pen.), 34'; Bruno Sávio 63'; R. Vaca 83'

Estadio El Teniente, Rancagua (Note: Palestino played their home matches at Estadio El Teniente, Rancagua and Estadio Municipal Francisco Sánchez Rumoroso, Coquimbo instead of their regular stadium Estadio Municipal de La Cisterna, Santiago which did not meet CONMEBOL requirements.)
Attendance: 3,114
Referee: Yael Falcón Pérez (Argentina)

10 April 2024
21:30 UTC−3

Flamengo (Brazil)	2–0	(Chile) Palestino
Pedro 21'; Léo Ortiz 85'	Report

Estádio do Maracanã, Rio de Janeiro
Attendance: 58,597
Referee: Facundo Tello (Argentina)
11 April 2024
18:00 UTC−4

Bolívar (Bolivia)	3–2	(Colombia) Millonarios
Jo. Sagredo 3'; Da Costa 10'; Bruno Sávio 34'	Report	L. Castro 45+1', 72' (pen.)

Estadio Hernando Siles, La Paz
Attendance: 14,485
Referee: Guillermo Guerrero (Ecuador)

24 April 2024
20:30 UTC−4

Bolívar (Bolivia)	2–1	(Brazil) Flamengo
Da Costa 2'; Bruno Sávio 62'	Report	Viña 5'

Estadio Hernando Siles, La Paz
Attendance: 22,620
Referee: Alexis Herrera (Venezuela)
25 April 2024
20:00 UTC−4

Palestino (Chile)	3–1	(Colombia) Millonarios
Chamorro 19', 42'; Véjar 75'	Report	L. Castro 32'

Estadio Municipal Francisco Sánchez Rumoroso, Coquimbo
Attendance: 1,918
Referee: Pablo Echavarría (Argentina)

7 May 2024
20:00 UTC−4

Palestino (Chile)	1–0	(Brazil) Flamengo
Cornejo 63'	Report

Estadio Municipal Francisco Sánchez Rumoroso, Coquimbo
Attendance: 4,217
Referee: Esteban Ostojich (Uruguay)
8 May 2024
21:00 UTC−5

Millonarios (Colombia)	1–1	(Bolivia) Bolívar
Llinás 43'	Report	R. Vaca 67'

Estadio El Campín, Bogotá
Attendance: 17,336
Referee: Yael Falcón Pérez (Argentina)

14 May 2024
21:00 UTC−5

Millonarios (Colombia)	1–1	(Chile) Palestino
Carvajal 40'	Report	Marabel 90+2'

Estadio El Campín, Bogotá
Attendance: 12,109
Referee: Maximiliano Ramírez (Argentina)
15 May 2024
21:30 UTC−3

Flamengo (Brazil)	4–0	(Bolivia) Bolívar
Gerson 1'; Ayrton Lucas 38'; Everton 43'; Pedro 56'	Report

Estádio do Maracanã, Rio de Janeiro
Attendance: 63,169
Referee: Andrés Matonte (Uruguay)

28 May 2024
21:00 UTC−3

Flamengo (Brazil)	3–0	(Colombia) Millonarios
Pedro 7', 44'; Vargas 25' (o.g.)	Report

Estádio do Maracanã, Rio de Janeiro
Attendance: 64,268
Referee: Facundo Tello (Argentina)
28 May 2024
20:00 UTC−4

Bolívar (Bolivia)	3–1	(Chile) Palestino
Bizama 35' (o.g.); Martínez 46' (o.g.); Da Costa 87'	Report	Chamorro 68'

Estadio Hernando Siles, La Paz
Attendance: 20,757
Referee: Andrés Merlos (Argentina)

=== Group F ===
Pos	Team	Pld	W	D	L	GF	GA	GD	Pts	Qualification	PAL	SLO	IDV	LIV
1	(Brazil) Palmeiras	6	4	2	0	14	5	+9	14	Advance to round of 16	—	0–0	2–1	3–1
2	(Argentina) San Lorenzo	6	2	2	2	6	6	0	8	Advance to round of 16	1–1	—	2–0	3–2
3	(Ecuador) Independiente del Valle	6	2	1	3	8	9	−1	7	Transfer to Copa Sudamericana	2–3	2–0	—	2–1
4	(Uruguay) Liverpool	6	1	1	4	6	14	−8	4		0–5	1–0	1–1	—

Source: CONMEBOL
3 April 2024
21:30 UTC−3

San Lorenzo (Argentina)	1–1	(Brazil) Palmeiras
Romaña 20'	Report	Piquerez 81'

Estadio Pedro Bidegain, Buenos Aires
Attendance: 20,007
Referee: Jesús Valenzuela (Venezuela)
4 April 2024
21:00 UTC−3

Liverpool (Uruguay)	1–1	(Ecuador) Independiente del Valle
L. Rodríguez 79'	Report	Ortiz 8'

Estadio Centenario, Montevideo (Note: Liverpool played their home matches at Estadio Centenario, Montevideo instead of their regular stadium Estadio Belvedere, Montevideo which did not meet CONMEBOL requirements.)
Attendance: 866
Referee: Andrés Rojas (Colombia)

10 April 2024
17:00 UTC−5

Independiente del Valle (Ecuador)	2–0	(Argentina) San Lorenzo
Sornoza 13' (pen.); Hoyos 45+1'	Report

Estadio Banco Guayaquil, Quito
Attendance: 4,007
Referee: Jhon Hinestroza (Colombia)
11 April 2024
21:00 UTC−3

Palmeiras (Brazil)	3–1	(Uruguay) Liverpool
Moreno 45+5'; López 58'; Estêvão 66'	Report	Rosso 3'

Allianz Parque, São Paulo
Attendance: 28,365
Referee: Ángel Arteaga (Venezuela)

23 April 2024
21:00 UTC−3

Liverpool (Uruguay)	1–0	(Argentina) San Lorenzo
Nicola 90+5'	Report

Estadio Centenario, Montevideo
Attendance: 3,977
Referee: Roberto Pérez (Peru)
24 April 2024
19:30 UTC−5

Independiente del Valle (Ecuador)	2–3	(Brazil) Palmeiras
Páez 12'; Hoyos 38'	Report	Endrick 45+2'; Lázaro 81'; Luis Guilherme 90+5'

Estadio Banco Guayaquil, Quito
Attendance: 6,552
Referee: Cristian Garay (Chile)

9 May 2024
19:00 UTC−3

San Lorenzo (Argentina)	2–0	(Ecuador) Independiente del Valle
Cuello 16'; Bareiro 24'	Report

Estadio Pedro Bidegain, Buenos Aires
Attendance: 17,127
Referee: Felipe González (Chile)
9 May 2024
19:00 UTC−3

Liverpool (Uruguay)	0–5	(Brazil) Palmeiras
	Report	Veiga 44', 71'; Endrick 82'; Rony 90+1'; Gómez 90+6' (pen.)

Estadio Centenario, Montevideo
Attendance: 1,848
Referee: Andrés Rojas (Colombia)

15 May 2024
21:30 UTC−3

Palmeiras (Brazil)	2–1	(Ecuador) Independiente del Valle
Ríos 36'; Gómez 45+3' (pen.)	Report	Díaz 64'

Allianz Parque, São Paulo
Attendance: 31,672
Referee: Alexis Herrera (Venezuela)
16 May 2024
21:00 UTC−3

San Lorenzo (Argentina)	3–2	(Uruguay) Liverpool
Leguizamón 5'; Cuello 45+5'; Campi 87'	Report	García 24'; L. Rodríguez 62'

Estadio Pedro Bidegain, Buenos Aires
Attendance: 17,084
Referee: Ángel Arteaga (Venezuela)

30 May 2024
19:00 UTC−3

Palmeiras (Brazil)	0–0	(Argentina) San Lorenzo
	Report

Allianz Parque, São Paulo
Attendance: 40,114
Referee: Felipe González (Chile)
30 May 2024
17:00 UTC−5

Independiente del Valle (Ecuador)	2–1	(Uruguay) Liverpool
Díaz 20', 55'	Report	González 35'

Estadio Banco Guayaquil, Quito
Attendance: 7,120
Referee: Carlos Ortega (Colombia)

=== Group G ===
Pos	Team	Pld	W	D	L	GF	GA	GD	Pts	Qualification	CAM	PEÑ	ROS	CAR
1	(Brazil) Atlético Mineiro	6	5	0	1	14	6	+8	15	Advance to round of 16	—	3–2	2–1	4–0
2	(Uruguay) Peñarol	6	4	0	2	12	5	+7	12	Advance to round of 16	2–0	—	2–1	5–0
3	(Argentina) Rosario Central	6	2	1	3	8	7	+1	7	Transfer to Copa Sudamericana	0–1	1–0	—	4–1
4	(Venezuela) Caracas	6	0	1	5	3	19	−16	1		1–4	0–1	1–1	—

Source: CONMEBOL
4 April 2024
18:00 UTC−4

Caracas (Venezuela)	1–4	(Brazil) Atlético Mineiro
Pérez 54'	Report	Bruno Fuchs 12'; Guilherme Arana 32'; Paulinho 44', 70'

Estadio Olímpico de la UCV, Caracas
Attendance: 7,344
Referee: Jhon Ospina (Colombia)
4 April 2024
19:00 UTC−3

Rosario Central (Argentina)	1–0	(Uruguay) Peñarol
Quintana 45+1'	Report

Estadio Gigante de Arroyito, Rosario
Attendance: 27,769
Referee: Wilmar Roldán (Colombia)

10 April 2024
19:00 UTC−3

Atlético Mineiro (Brazil)	2–1	(Argentina) Rosario Central
Scarpa 39'; Paulinho 77'	Report	Malcorra 74'

Arena MRV, Belo Horizonte
Attendance: 34,917
Referee: Kevin Ortega (Peru)
10 April 2024
21:00 UTC−3

Peñarol (Uruguay)	5–0	(Venezuela) Caracas
Silvera 16', 25', 64'; Méndez 32'; Darias 45'	Report

Estadio Campeón del Siglo, Montevideo
Attendance: 23,944
Referee: Felipe González (Chile)

23 April 2024
18:00 UTC−4

Caracas (Venezuela)	1–1	(Argentina) Rosario Central
Pernía 25'	Report	Módica 67'

Estadio Olímpico de la UCV, Caracas
Attendance: 4,155
Referee: Gery Vargas (Bolivia)
23 April 2024
21:00 UTC−3

Atlético Mineiro (Brazil)	3–2	(Uruguay) Peñarol
Scarpa 15', 57'; Paulinho 26'	Report	Olivera 60'; Silvera 68'

Arena MRV, Belo Horizonte
Attendance: 34,279
Referee: Andrés Rojas (Colombia)

7 May 2024
19:00 UTC−3

Rosario Central (Argentina)	0–1	(Brazil) Atlético Mineiro
	Report	Paulinho 87'

Estadio Gigante de Arroyito, Rosario
Attendance: 0 (Note: Rosario Central played their home match against Atlético Mineiro behind closed doors due to incidents in their group stage match against Peñarol.)
Referee: Piero Maza (Chile)
7 May 2024
18:00 UTC−4

Caracas (Venezuela)	0–1	(Uruguay) Peñarol
	Report	Rodríguez 26'

Estadio Olímpico de la UCV, Caracas
Attendance: 4,252
Referee: Mario Díaz de Vivar (Paraguay)

14 May 2024
19:00 UTC−3

Peñarol (Uruguay)	2–0	(Brazil) Atlético Mineiro
Hernández 70'; Silvera 76'	Report

Estadio Campeón del Siglo, Montevideo
Attendance: 29,086
Referee: Wilmar Roldán (Colombia)
16 May 2024
19:00 UTC−3

Rosario Central (Argentina)	4–1	(Venezuela) Caracas
Lovera 29'; Módica 33', 57'; Lo Celso 90+1'	Report	Echenique 85'

Estadio Gigante de Arroyito, Rosario
Attendance: 23,244
Referee: Roberto Pérez (Peru)

28 May 2024
19:00 UTC−3

Peñarol (Uruguay)	2–1	(Argentina) Rosario Central
Fernández 32', 83'	Report	Módica 66'

Estadio Campeón del Siglo, Montevideo
Attendance: 29,681
Referee: Piero Maza (Chile)
28 May 2024
19:00 UTC−3

Atlético Mineiro (Brazil)	4–0	(Venezuela) Caracas
Pedrinho 28', 61'; Alisson 40'; Hulk 90+3'	Report

Arena MRV, Belo Horizonte
Attendance: 28,455
Referee: Guillermo Guerrero (Ecuador)

=== Group H ===
Pos	Team	Pld	W	D	L	GF	GA	GD	Pts	Qualification	RIV	NAC	LIB	TAC
1	(Argentina) River Plate	6	5	1	0	12	3	+9	16	Advance to round of 16	—	2–0	2–0	2–0
2	(Uruguay) Nacional	6	3	1	2	8	7	+1	10	Advance to round of 16	2–2	—	2–0	2–1
3	(Paraguay) Libertad	6	2	1	3	7	8	−1	7	Transfer to Copa Sudamericana	1–2	2–1	—	3–0
4	(Venezuela) Deportivo Táchira	6	0	1	5	2	11	−9	1		0–2	0–1	1–1	—

Source: CONMEBOL
2 April 2024
20:00 UTC−4

Deportivo Táchira (Venezuela)	0–2	(Argentina) River Plate
	Report	Boselli 72'; Fonseca 79'

Estadio Polideportivo de Pueblo Nuevo, San Cristóbal
Attendance: 34,790
Referee: Raphael Claus (Brazil)
3 April 2024
19:00 UTC−3

Nacional (Uruguay)	2–0	(Paraguay) Libertad
Lozano 32'; Bentancourt 62'	Report

Estadio Gran Parque Central, Montevideo
Attendance: 28,055
Referee: Anderson Daronco (Brazil)

9 April 2024
20:00 UTC−4

Libertad (Paraguay)	3–0	(Venezuela) Deportivo Táchira
Sanabria 32'; Melgarejo 39'; Aguilar 78'	Report

Estadio La Huerta, Asunción
Attendance: 6,972
Referee: Andrés Rojas (Colombia)
11 April 2024
21:00 UTC−3

River Plate (Argentina)	2–0	(Uruguay) Nacional
Echeverri 15'; Colidio 90+3'	Report

Estadio Monumental, Buenos Aires
Attendance: 64,766
Referee: Cristian Garay (Chile)

24 April 2024
19:00 UTC−3

Nacional (Uruguay)	2–1	(Venezuela) Deportivo Táchira
Castro 14'; Recoba 21'	Report	Ruiz Díaz 30'

Estadio Gran Parque Central, Montevideo
Attendance: 25,954
Referee: Ramon Abatti (Brazil)
24 April 2024
20:30 UTC−4 (Note: The Libertad v River Plate match, originally scheduled for 24 April 2024, 20:00 local time, was rescheduled to 20:30 local time.)

Libertad (Paraguay)	1–2	(Argentina) River Plate
Espinoza 40'	Report	Solari 34'; Mastantuono 80'

Estadio Defensores del Chaco, Asunción (Note: Libertad played their home match against River Plate at Estadio Defensores del Chaco, Asunción instead of their regular stadium Estadio La Huerta, Asunción.)
Attendance: 18,290
Referee: Raphael Claus (Brazil)

7 May 2024
20:00 UTC−4

Deportivo Táchira (Venezuela)	1–1	(Paraguay) Libertad
J. Hernández 31'	Report	Santa Cruz 50'

Estadio Polideportivo de Pueblo Nuevo, San Cristóbal
Attendance: 8,195
Referee: Wilton Sampaio (Brazil)
7 May 2024
21:00 UTC−3

Nacional (Uruguay)	2–2	(Argentina) River Plate
Carneiro 78' (pen.), 79'	Report	Borja 8'; Colidio 30'

Estadio Gran Parque Central, Montevideo
Attendance: 32,959
Referee: Anderson Daronco (Brazil)

14 May 2024
21:30 UTC−3 (Note: The River Plate v Libertad match, originally scheduled for 14 May 2024, 21:00 local time, was rescheduled to 21:30 local time.)

River Plate (Argentina)	2–0	(Paraguay) Libertad
Borja 41', 84'	Report

Estadio Monumental, Buenos Aires
Attendance: 61,777
Referee: Piero Maza (Chile)
15 May 2024
18:00 UTC−4

Deportivo Táchira (Venezuela)	0–1	(Uruguay) Nacional
	Report	Castro 53'

Estadio Polideportivo de Pueblo Nuevo, San Cristóbal
Attendance: 7,392
Referee: Jhon Ospina (Colombia)

30 May 2024
21:00 UTC−3

River Plate (Argentina)	2–0	(Venezuela) Deportivo Táchira
Borja 51', 85'	Report

Estadio Monumental, Buenos Aires
Attendance: 63,335
Referee: Kevin Ortega (Peru)
30 May 2024
20:00 UTC−4

Libertad (Paraguay)	2–1	(Uruguay) Nacional
Ó. Cardozo 29'; Silva 41'	Report	Romero 13'

Estadio La Huerta, Asunción
Attendance: 5,948
Referee: Wilton Sampaio (Brazil)
