= Hernán Mastrángelo =

Argentine football referee (born 1981)

- Born: 4 April 1981 (age 45); Buenos Aires, Argentina

Domestic
Years	League	Role
2017–present	Argentine Primera División	Referee

International
Years	League	Role
2023–present	FIFA listed	Video assistant referee

Hernán Mastrángelo (born 4 April 1981) is an Argentine football referee who has been listed as a video assistant referee by FIFA since 2023.

== Career ==
Mastrángelo was born on 4 April 1981 in Buenos Aires, the son of Carlos Mastrángelo, a football referee. Before retiring in the late 1990s, Mastrágenlo said that he was an avid fan of Club Atlético River Plate. He also was a renowned trade unionist.

Hernán Mastrángelo began his career following the footsteps of his father. However, he became a professional referee in 2015 and debuted in Argentina's top-tier AFA Liga Profesional de Fútbol in 2017, when he was in his mid 30s. His first top-league game was a match between Club Atlético Vélez Sarsfield and Club Atlético Huracán, which ended in a 1–1 draw. Mastrángelo has overseen matches at other national tournaments, including Copa Argentina, where he has drawn criticism or controversy over his refereeing style or due to his sister recalling in an interview the family's long tradition of supporting River Plate.

Since 2023, Mastrángelo has been listed by FIFA as a video assistant referee (VAR), a position he also holds in Argentine football. Among his most prominent matches as VAR are the 2024 Copa Libertadores final and games at the 2025 FIFA Club World Cup.

In April 2026, he was selected by FIFA as a video assistant referee for the 2026 FIFA World Cup, becoming part of a large group of Argentine referees at the tournament, including Darío Herrera, Facundo Tello, Yael Falcón, and Juan Pablo Belatti.
