= Alexander Barboza =

Argentine footballer (born 1995)

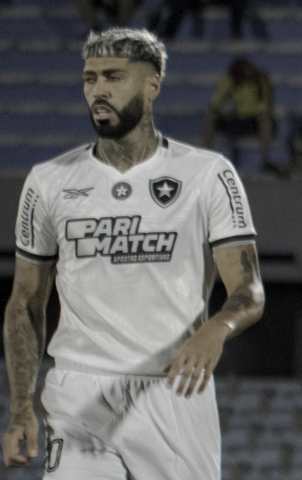
- Barboza playing for Botafogo in 2024

Personal information
- Full name: Alexander Nahuel Barboza Ullúa
- Date of birth: 16 March 1995 (age 31)
- Place of birth: Villa Celina, Buenos Aires, Argentina
- Height: 1.92 m (6 ft 4 in)
- Position: Centre-back

Team information
- Current team: Palmeiras
- Number: 2

Youth career
- 2005–2014: River Plate

Senior career*
Years	Team	Apps	(Gls)
2014–2019	River Plate	5	(0)
2015	→ Atlético de Rafaela (loan)	11	(1)
2016–2017	→ Defensa y Justicia (loan)	42	(6)
2018–2019	→ Defensa y Justicia (loan)	33	(1)
2019–2021	Independiente	18	(1)
2021–2023	Libertad	84	(7)
2024–2026	Botafogo	71	(2)
2026–	Palmeiras	2	(0)
- * Club domestic league appearances and goals as of 31 July 2026

Alexander Nahuel Barboza Ullúa (born 16 March 1995) is an Argentine professional footballer who plays as a center-back for Campeonato Brasileiro Série A club Palmeiras.

== Early and personal life ==
Barboza was born on 16 March 1995 in the neighborhood of Villa Celina in Buenos Aires to a Uruguayan father and an Argentine mother. In 2024, Barboza expressed his desire to play for the Uruguay national football team under Marcelo Bielsa. He has since applied for Uruguayan citizenship.

== Career ==
=== Independiente ===
On 4 July 2019 it was confirmed that Barboza had joined Club Atlético Independiente on a permanent transfer. The Argentine club bought 82,5% of his rights for four years.

=== Botafogo ===
On 1 January 2024 it was confirmed that Barboza had joined Botafogo on a permanent transfer. Where he has often starred in episodes of emotional instability and violence.

=== Palmeiras ===
On May 22, 2026, he became a reinforcement for Palmeiras and signed a contract until December 2028, with an option to extend it for another year.

== Honours ==
River Plate

- Copa Argentina: 2016–17

Libertad

- División de Honor: 2021 Apertura, 2022 Apertura, 2023 Apertura, 2023 Clausura
- Copa Paraguay: 2023
- Supercopa Paraguay: 2023

Botafogo

- Taça Rio: 2024
- Copa Libertadores: 2024
- Campeonato Brasileiro Série A: 2024

Individual

- Campeonato Brasileiro Série A Team of the Year: 2024
- Copa Libertadores Team of the Tournament: 2024
- South American Team of the Year: 2024
