= Luiz Henrique (footballer, born 2001) =

Brazilian footballer (born 2001)

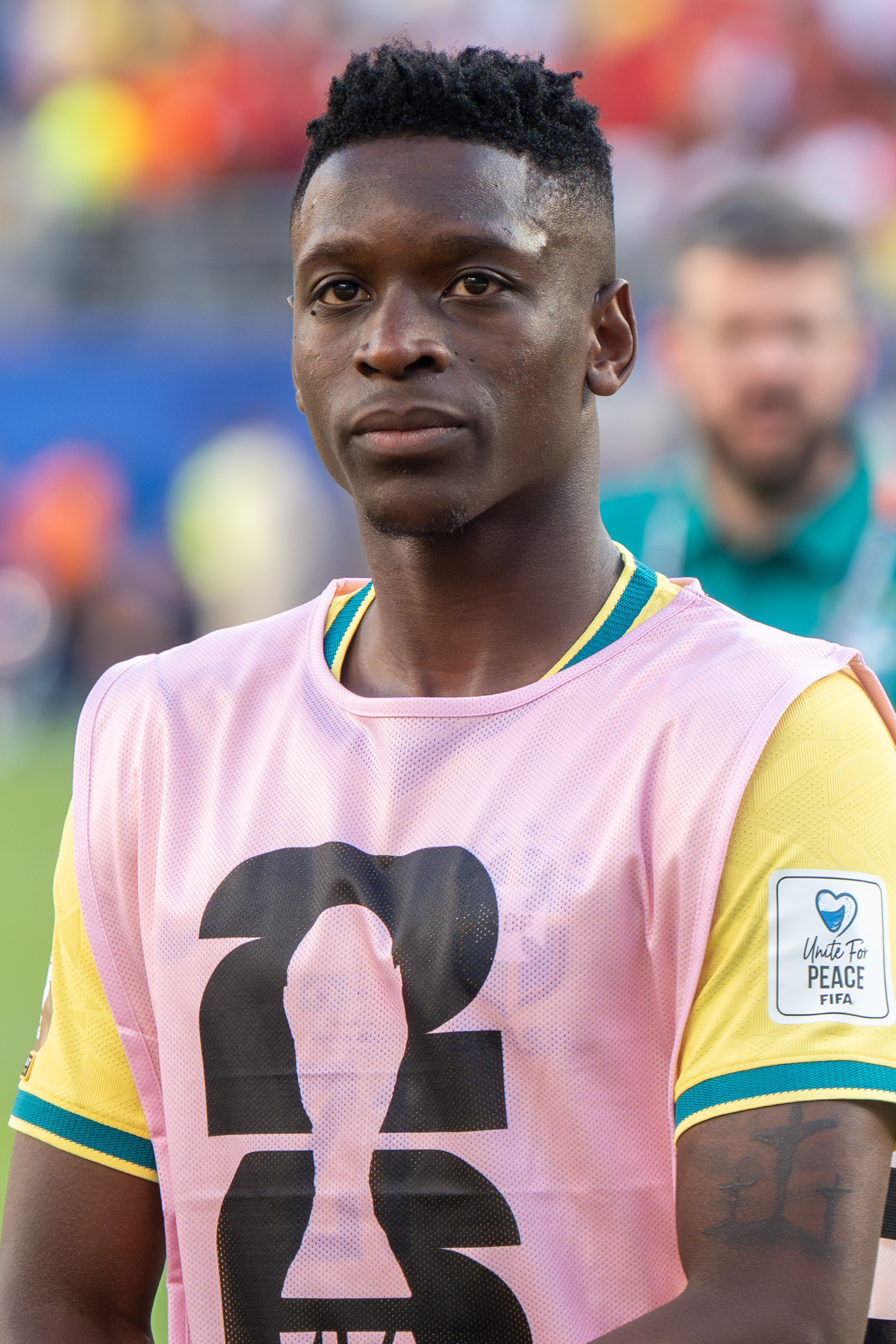
- Luiz Henrique with Brazil in 2026

Personal information
- Full name: Luiz Henrique André Rosa da Silva
- Date of birth: 2 January 2001 (age 25)
- Place of birth: Petrópolis, Rio de Janeiro, Brazil
- Height: 1.82 m (6 ft 0 in)
- Position: Right winger

Team information
- Current team: Zenit Saint Petersburg
- Number: 11

Youth career
- 2010–2020: Fluminense

Senior career*
Years	Team	Apps	(Gls)
2020–2022	Fluminense	89	(10)
2022–2024	Real Betis	47	(1)
2024–2025	Botafogo	38	(7)
2025–	Zenit Saint Petersburg	52	(12)

International career^{‡}
2020	Brazil U20	1	(0)
2024–	Brazil	16	(2)
- * Club domestic league appearances and goals as of 21 November 2026 ‡ National team caps and goals as of 13 June 2026

Luiz Henrique André Rosa da Silva (born 2 January 2001), commonly known as Luiz Henrique (Brazilian Portuguese: [luˈiz ẽˈʁiki]), is a Brazilian professional footballer who plays as a right winger for Russian Premier League club Zenit Saint Petersburg and the Brazil national team.

== Club career ==
=== Fluminense ===
Born in Petrópolis, Rio de Janeiro, Luiz Henrique joined Fluminense's youth setup at the age of 9 in 2010. He made his first team – and Série A – debut on 12 August 2020, coming on as a second-half substitute for Nenê in a 1–1 home draw against Palmeiras.

On 7 September 2020, Luiz Henrique renewed his contract until September 2025. He scored his first professional goal on 17 October, netting the opener in a 2–2 home draw against Ceará.

=== Real Betis ===
In summer 2022, Luiz Henrique moved to Real Betis, agreeing to a contract until 2028.

=== Botafogo ===
On 31 January 2024, John Textor, owner of Eagle Football and majority shareholder of Botafogo, announced the signing of Luiz Henrique, at the time the biggest signing in Brazilian football history, worth 106.6 million reals. Henrique was signed for one season.

At the State Championship, against Volta Redonda, in the second game for Botafogo, Luiz Henrique left the field in the 78th minute with a calf injury. The injury was confirmed by Botafogo on February 16, in an official statement.

Luiz Henrique returned to play for Botafogo on 31 March in the 2-0 victory over Boavista, in the second game of the Rio Cup final. The striker played the opening 45 minutes. He scored his first goal for Botafogo in a 3-1 win over Universitario in Copa Libertadores.

In the 2024 Copa Libertadores final, Luiz Henrique scored the opening goal of Botafogo's win. He was elected man of the match and of the tournament.

=== Zenit Saint Petersburg ===
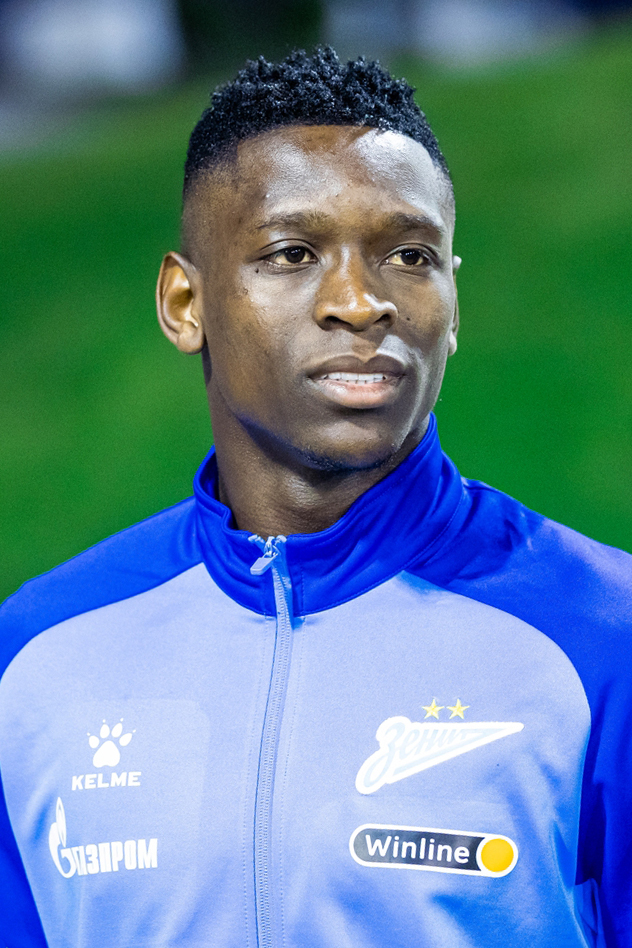
Luiz Henrique with Zenit Saint Petersburg in 2025

On 20 January 2025, Russian champions Zenit St. Petersburg announced the transfer of Luiz Henrique to Zenit, with Artur moving in the opposite direction, and Wendel also moving to Botafogo at the end of the 2024–25 Russian season. Luiz Henrique signed a contract with Zenit for four years, with an optional fifth year.

== International career ==
Luiz Henrique made his debut for the Brazil national team on 6 September 2024 in a World Cup qualifier against Ecuador at the Estádio Couto Pereira. He started the game and played 62 minutes in Brazil's 1-0 win.

In May 2026, Henrique was selected for Brazil's squad for the 2026 FIFA World Cup.

== Career statistics ==
=== Club ===
As of match played 21 November 2026

Appearances and goals by club, season and competition
Club	Season	League			State league (Note: Includes Campeonato Carioca)		National cup (Note: Includes Copa do Brasil, Copa del Rey, Russian Cup)		Continental		Other		Total	
Club	Season	Division	Apps	Goals	Apps	Goals	Apps	Goals	Apps	Goals	Apps	Goals	Apps	Goals
Fluminense	2020	Série A	26	2	0	0	2	0	—		—		28	2
Fluminense	2021	Série A	33	6	6	0	6	1	10 (Note: Appearances in Copa Libertadores)	0	—		55	7
Fluminense	2022	Série A	14	2	10	0	3	1	10 (Note: Four appearances and one goal in Copa Libertadores, six appearances and one goal in Copa Sudamericana)	2	—		37	4
Fluminense	Total		73	10	16	0	11	2	20	2	—		120	14
Betis	2022–23	La Liga	33	1	—		2	0	7 (Note: Appearances in UEFA Europa League)	2	1 (Note: Appearance in Supercopa de España)	0	43	3
Betis	2023–24	La Liga	14	0	—		2	1	5	0	—		21	1
Betis	Total		47	1	—		4	1	12	2	1	0	64	4
Botafogo	2024	Série A	35	7	3	0	4	1	12	4	1 (Note: Appearance in FIFA Intercontinental Cup)	0	55	12
Zenit Saint Petersburg	2024–25	Russian Premier League	11	2	—		3	0	—		—		14	2
Zenit Saint Petersburg	2025–26	Russian Premier League	28	6	—		6	0	—		—		34	6
Zenit Saint Petersburg	2026–27	Russian Premier League	13	4	—		3	0	—		—		16	4
Zenit Saint Petersburg	Total		52	12	—		12	0	—		—		64	12
Career total			207	30	19	0	31	4	44	8	2	0	303	42

=== International ===
As of match played 13 June 2026

Appearances and goals by national team and year
National team	Year	Apps	Goals
Brazil	2024	6	2
Brazil	2025	5	0
Brazil	2026	5	0
Total		16	2

Scores and results list Brazil's goal tally first.

List of international goals scored by Luiz Henrique
No.	Date	Venue	Cap	Opponent	Score	Result	Competition
1	10 October 2024	Estadio Nacional, Santiago, Chile	3	Chile	2–1	2–1	2026 FIFA World Cup qualification
2	15 October 2024	Arena BRB Mané Garrincha, Brasília, Brazil	4	Peru	4–0	4–0	2026 FIFA World Cup qualification

== Honours ==
Fluminense

- Campeonato Carioca: 2022

Botafogo

- Copa Libertadores de América: 2024
- Campeonato Brasileiro: 2024
- Taça Rio: 2024

Zenit Saint Petersburg

- Russian Premier League: 2025–26

Individual

- Prêmio Craque do Brasileirão: 2024
- Campeonato Brasileiro Série A Team of the Year: 2024
- Bola de Prata: 2024
- Troféu Mesa Redonda Team of the Year: 2024
- Copa Libertadores Hero of the Tournament: 2024
- Copa Libertadores Team of the Tournament: 2024
- South American Footballer of the Year: 2024
- South American Team of the Year: 2024
