= Bruno Sávio =

Brazilian footballer (born 1994)

Personal information
- Full name: Bruno Sávio da Silva
- Date of birth: 1 August 1994 (age 32)
- Place of birth: Pará de Minas, Brazil
- Height: 1.84 m (6 ft 0 in)
- Position: Forward

Team information
- Current team: Goiás
- Number: 11

Youth career
- 2013–2014: América Mineiro

Senior career*
Years	Team	Apps	(Gls)
2015–2018	América Mineiro	50	(8)
2017	→ Mirassol (loan)	13	(3)
2017	→ Cuiabá (loan)	14	(4)
2018	→ Bragantino (loan)	7	(2)
2018	→ Cuiabá (loan)	16	(5)
2019–2020	Louletano	0	(0)
2019	→ Istra 1961 (loan)	9	(3)
2019	→ Avaí (loan)	5	(1)
2020	→ Guarani (loan)	38	(3)
2021	Guarani	40	(12)
2022	Bolivar	31	(18)
2022–2023	Al Ahly	14	(1)
2023–2025	Bolìvar	25	(11)
2025	Millonarios	5	(0)
2026–	Goiás	11	(0)
- * Club domestic league appearances and goals as of 15 April 2026

Bruno Sávio da Silva (born 1 August 1994) is a Brazilian professional footballer who plays as a forward for Goiás.

== Club career ==
Born in igaratinga, Minas Gerais, Bruno Sávio joined América Mineiro's youth setup in 2013, after a trial period. On 5 August 2014, after impressing with the under-20s, he renewed his contract until 2017.

Bruno Sávio made his senior debut on 1 February 2015, coming on as a second-half substitute in a 0–0 Campeonato Mineiro away draw against Guarani. He made his Série B debut on 9 May, starting in a 1–1 home draw against Bahia.

Bruno Sávio scored his first professional goal on 3 October 2015, netting a last-minute winner in a 2–1 success at Mogi Mirim.

In January 2022, he joined Bolívar and in his debut game against Blooming on 6 February 2022, he scored a hat-trick.

In September 2022, he transferred to Egyptian club Al Ahly. On 28 October 2022, he scored his first goal for Al Ahly in a 2–0 win against Zamalek in the 2021–22 Egyptian Super Cup. Hence, he won his first title ever in his career.

== Honours ==
Al Ahly

- Egyptian Premier League: 2022–23
- Egyptian Super Cup: 2021–22
- Egypt Cup: 2021–22
- CAF Champions League: 2022–23

Club Bolívar

- Bolivian Premier League: 2022
- Tigo Cup 2023
- Bolivian Premier League: 2024

== Career statistics ==
=== Club ===
As of 9 April 2024

Club	Season	League			State League		National Cup		Continental		Other		Total	
Club	Season	Division	Apps	Goals	Apps	Goals	Apps	Goals	Apps	Goals	Apps	Goals	Apps	Goals
América Mineiro	2014	Série B	0	0	—		—		—		—		0	0
América Mineiro	2015	Série B	14	1	8 (Note: Appearance(s) in Campeonato Mineiro)	0	2	0	—		—		24	1
América Mineiro	2016	Série A	14	1	8	1	3	0	—		3 (Note: Appearance(s) in Primeira Liga)	1	28	3
América Mineiro	Total		28	2	16	1	5	0	—		3	1	52	4
Mirassol (loan)	2017	Paulista Série A1	—		13 (Note: Appearance(s) in Campeonato Paulista)	1	—		—		—		13	1
Cuiabá (loan)	2017	Série C	14	3	—		—		—		—		14	3
Cuiabá (loan)	2018	Série C	16	4	—		—		—		—		16	4
Cuiabá (loan)	Total		30	7	—		—		—		—		30	7
Bragantino (loan)	2018	Série C	—		5	0	3	0	—		—		8	0
Istra 1961	2018-19	HNL	9	0	—		—		—		—		9	0
Avaí	2019	Série A	5	0	—		—		—		—		5	0
Guarani (loan)	2020	Série B	28	3	10	0	—		—		—		38	3
Guarani	2021	Série B	32	11	8	1	—		—		—		40	12
Bolívar	2022	División de Fútbol Profesional	27	14	—		—		4 (Note: Appearance(s) in Copa Libertadores)	2	—		31	16
Al Ahly	2022-23	Egyptian Premier League	14	1	—		1	0	2 (Note: Appearance(s) in CAF Champions League)	0	1 (Note: Appearance(s) in Egyptian Super Cup)	1	18	2
Bolívar	2023	División de Fútbol Profesional	12	7	—		—		4	0	11 (Note: Appearance(s) in Copa de la División Profesional)	2	27	9
Bolívar	2024	División de Fútbol Profesional	6	1	—		—		1	1	—		7	2
Bolívar	Total		18	8	—		—		5	1	11	2	34	11
Career Total			191	46	52	3	9	0	11	3	15	4	278	56
