= Maximiliano Silvera =

Uruguayan footballer (born 1997)

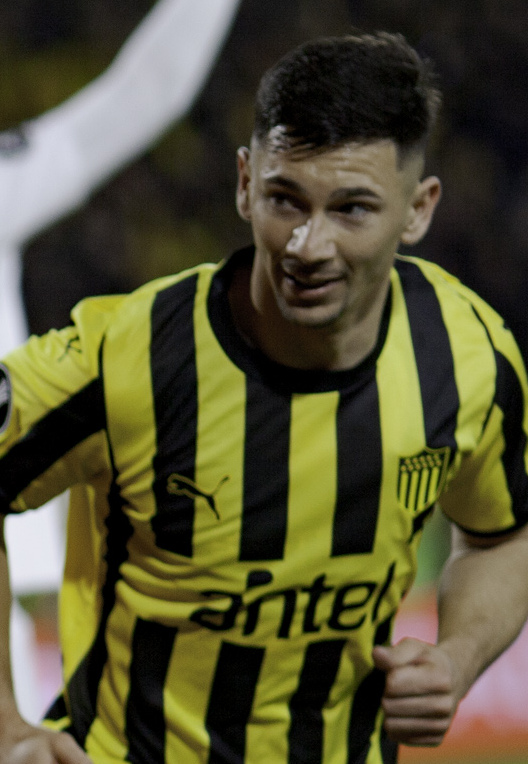
- Silvera with Peñarol in 2024

Personal information
- Full name: Maximiliano Joaquín Silvera Cabo
- Date of birth: 5 September 1997 (age 29)
- Place of birth: Pando, Uruguay
- Height: 1.76 m (5 ft 9 in)
- Position: Forward

Team information
- Current team: Nacional
- Number: 11

Youth career
- Estrella de Oro
- Peñarol
- Danubio
- Cerrito

Senior career*
| Years | Team | Apps | (Gls) |
| 2015–2023 | Cerrito | 151 | (56) |
| 2022 | → Juárez (loan) | 24 | (0) |
| 2023 | → Necaxa (loan) | 15 | (1) |
| 2023 | Santos | 12 | (1) |
| 2024–2025 | Peñarol | 64 | (21) |
| 2026– | Nacional | 11 | (2) |
- * Club domestic league appearances and goals as of 23 May 2026

Maximiliano Joaquín Silvera Cabo (born 5 September 1997) is a Uruguayan professional footballer who plays as a forward for Liga AUF Uruguaya club Nacional.

== Career ==
=== Early career ===
Born in Pando, Silvera began his career with Estrella de Oro FC. He then spent a short period at Peñarol's youth sides before joining Danubio. He left the latter club as he was not getting paid for his travel expenses, and subsequently moved to Cerrito at the age of 16.

=== Cerrito ===
Silvera made his first team debut with Cerrito on 21 March 2015, coming on as a second-half substitute in a 4–2 Segunda División home defeat against Villa Española. He featured in just one more match for the side during the season, as they suffered relegation to the Segunda División Amateur.

Silvera scored his first senior goal on 7 November 2015, netting his team's second in a 3–2 away win over Basáñez. He scored a further three times during the campaign, as they returned to the second division.

Silvera was instrumental in Cerrito's promotion to the Primera División after the conclusion of 2020 Segunda División season. With 11 goals, he was league top scorer and was chosen as the best player.

Silvera made his top tier debut on 16 May 2021, starting and scoring the opener in a 3–1 home win over River Plate Montevideo. On 17 June, he scored a hat-trick in an away win over Fénix for the same scoreline, and finished the year again as the division's top goalscorer with 21 goals; he was also chosen as the best forward and breakthrough player of the competition by newspaper El Observador.

==== Loan to Juárez ====
On 3 February 2022, Silvera moved abroad for the first time in his career and joined Liga MX side Juárez on loan until the end of the year. He made his debut for the club six days later, starting in a 3–1 home loss to Guadalajara.

In November 2022, after failing to score a goal for the club, Silvera left Juárez.

==== Loan to Necaxa ====
On 3 January 2023, Silvera was announced at fellow Mexican top tier side Necaxa on loan. He scored his first goal abroad on 11 February, netting his team's only in a 2–1 loss at Club América.

In August 2023, Silvera left Necaxa.

=== Santos ===
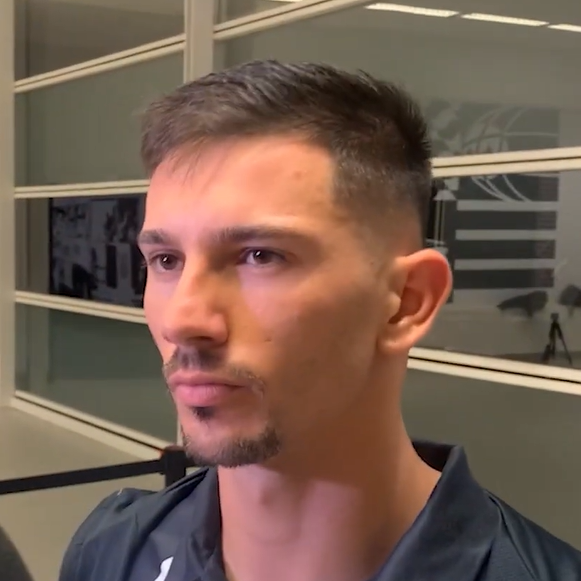
Silvera in 2023

On 30 August 2023, Silvera switched teams and countries after signing a contract with Campeonato Brasileiro Série A side Santos until the end of the year. He made his debut on 8 October, replacing Alfredo Morelos in a 2–1 away win against Palmeiras and assisting Marcos Leonardo's winning goal.

Silvera scored his first goal for Peixe on 22 October 2023, but in a 7–1 away loss to Internacional.

=== Peñarol ===
On 4 January 2024, Silvera was presented at Peñarol, reuniting with former Santos manager Diego Aguirre.

== Career statistics ==
As of 10 April 2024

Appearances and goals by club, season and competition
| Club | Season | League | | | Cup | | Continental | | Other | | Total | |
| Club | Season | Division | Apps | Goals | Apps | Goals | Apps | Goals | Apps | Goals | Apps | Goals |
|---|---|---|---|---|---|---|---|---|---|---|---|---|
| Cerrito | 2014–15 | Uruguayan Segunda División | 2 | 0 | — | | — | | — | | 2 | 0 |
| Cerrito | 2015–16 | Uruguayan Segunda División Amateur | 17 | 4 | — | | — | | — | | 17 | 4 |
| Cerrito | 2016 | Uruguayan Segunda División | 12 | 0 | — | | — | | — | | 12 | 0 |
| Cerrito | 2017 | Uruguayan Segunda División | 28 | 6 | — | | — | | 4 (Note: Appearance(s) in Segunda División play-offs.) | 1 | 32 | 7 |
| Cerrito | 2018 | Uruguayan Segunda División | 25 | 9 | — | | — | | — | | 25 | 9 |
| Cerrito | 2019 | Uruguayan Segunda División | 17 | 5 | — | | — | | 1 | 0 | 18 | 5 |
| Cerrito | 2020 | Uruguayan Segunda División | 20 | 11 | — | | — | | — | | 20 | 11 |
| Cerrito | 2021 | Uruguayan Primera División | 30 | 21 | — | | — | | — | | 30 | 21 |
| Cerrito | Total | | 151 | 56 | — | | — | | 5 | 1 | 156 | 57 |
| Juárez (loan) | 2021–22 | Liga MX | 14 | 0 | — | | — | | — | | 14 | 0 |
| Juárez (loan) | 2022–23 | Liga MX | 10 | 0 | — | | — | | — | | 10 | 0 |
| Juárez (loan) | Total | | 24 | 0 | — | | — | | — | | 24 | 0 |
| Necaxa (loan) | 2022–23 | Liga MX | 12 | 1 | — | | — | | — | | 12 | 1 |
| Necaxa (loan) | 2023–24 | Liga MX | 3 | 0 | — | | — | | 2 (Note: Appearances in Leagues Cup.) | 0 | 5 | 0 |
| Necaxa (loan) | Total | | 15 | 1 | — | | — | | 2 | 0 | 17 | 1 |
| Santos | 2023 | Série A | 12 | 1 | — | | — | | — | | 12 | 1 |
| Peñarol | 2023 | Uruguayan Primera División | — | | 2 | 0 | — | | — | | 2 | 0 |
| Peñarol | 2024 | Uruguayan Primera División | 7 | 2 | 0 | 0 | 2 (Note: Appearances in Copa Libertadores.) | 3 | — | | 9 | 5 |
| Peñarol | Total | | 7 | 2 | 2 | 0 | 2 | 3 | 0 | 0 | 11 | 5 |
| Career total | | | 209 | 60 | 2 | 0 | 2 | 3 | 7 | 1 | 220 | 64 |

== Honours ==
Cerrito

- Uruguayan Segunda División: 2020
- Uruguayan Segunda División Amateur: 2015–16

Peñarol

- Uruguayan Primera División: 2024
- Copa Uruguay: 2025

Individual

- Uruguayan Primera División team of the year: 2021, 2024
- Uruguayan Primera División top scorer: 2021
- Uruguayan Segunda División best player: 2020
- Uruguayan Segunda División top scorer: 2020
