= Facundo Tello =

Football referee

- Tello at the 2026 FIFA World Cup
- Full name: Facundo Raúl Tello Figueroa
- Born: 4 May 1982 (age 44); Bahía Blanca, Argentina

Domestic
Years	League	Role
2013–	AFA Liga Profesional de Fútbol	Referee

International
Years	League	Role
2019–	FIFA	Referee

Facundo Raúl Tello Figueroa (born 4 May 1982) is an Argentine football referee who is a listed international referee for FIFA since 2019. He has been officiating the highest division of Argentine football league since 2013. Tello has officiated many high level tournaments including the 2022 FIFA World Cup, UEFA Euro 2024, and the 2026 FIFA World Cup.

== Biography ==
Facundo Tello was born in Bahía Blanca, in the Buenos Aires Province on 4 May 1982.

== Career ==
Tello debuted in the highest category of Argentine football with only four matches in the second division, where he officiated the Godoy Cruz and Vélez Sarsfield match, on the fourteenth date of the 2013 Final Tournament.

Tello, who belongs to the Bahiense Association of Referees, made his first steps in tournaments of the Argentine Soccer Association from 2011, when he debuted in the then Argentine Tournament A.

As he was settled in the first division, Tello officiated the first summer superclassic of 2018, with the Millionaires victory 1–0. That same year, he was summoned to officiate in the return final that defined the second promotion to the 2018-2019 Super League, between San Martín de Tucumán and Sarmiento with a 5–1 victory for San Martín de Tucumán.

In 2019, Tello entered the roster of international referees for FIFA as he was appointed by Conmebol as a 4th official for the South American U-20 Championship in Chile along with his colleagues Fernando Rapallini, Ezequiel Brailosky and Gabriel Chade, becoming the first Bahia collegiate to achieve this distinction.

He was one of the appointed referees to officiate the 2021 FIFA Arab Cup, as he was summoned to officiate the match between Jordan and Morocco. Tello was one of the referees chosen for the 2022 FIFA World Cup. On 6 November 2022, Tello refereed Argentina's Champions Trophy final between Boca Juniors and Racing Club, where he brandished ten red cards (seven red cards to Boca and three to Racing). Tello was selected to the FIFA Club World Cup in 2025, and was invited back to his second FIFA World Cup in North America.

== Selected performances ==
2022 FIFA World Cup – Qatar
Date	Match	Result	Round	Venue
24 November 2022	Switzerland – Cameroon	1–0	Group stage	Al Janoub Stadium, Al Wakrah
2 December 2022	South Korea – Portugal	2–1	Group stage	Education City Stadium, Al Rayyan
10 December 2022	Morocco – Portugal	1–0	Quarter-finals	Al Thumama Stadium, Doha
2026 FIFA World Cup – North America
Date	Match	Result	Round	Venue
12 June 2026	Canada – Bosnia and Herzegovina	1–1	Group stage	BMO Field, Toronto
24 June 2026	South Africa – South Korea	1–0	Group stage	Estadio BBVA, Guadalupe
9 July 2026	France – Morocco	2-0	Quarter-finals	Gillette Stadium, Foxborough
