= 2020–21 Moreirense F.C. season =

Moreirense
2020–21 season
- Chairman: Vítor Magalhães
- Manager: Vasco Seabra
- Stadium: Parque Moreira de Cónegos
- Primeira Liga: 7th
- Taça de Portugal: Fifth round
- Top goalscorer: League: Rafael Martins; Yan (4 each); All: Óscar Estupiñán (8)
Home colours	Away colours	Third colours
- All statistics correct as of 7 March 2021.

The 2020–21 season is the 82nd season in the existence of Moreirense F.C. and the club's 7th consecutive season in the top-flight of Portuguese football. In addition to the domestic league, Moreirense participated in this season's editions of the Taça de Portugal and Taça da Liga.

== Players ==
=== First-team squad ===
As of 21 February 2021

Note: Flags indicate national team as defined under FIFA eligibility rules; some limited exceptions apply. Players may hold more than one non-FIFA nationality.

No.	Pos.	Nation	Player
1	GK	BRA	Kewin (on loan from Mirassol)
2	DF	BEL	Anthony D'Alberto
3	DF	SRB	Lazar Rosić
4	DF	VEN	Nahuel Ferraresi (on loan from Manchester City)
5	DF	POR	Abdu Conté
6	MF	POR	Fábio Pacheco
8	MF	GUI	Ibrahima Camará
10	FW	BRA	Felipe Pires
11	FW	BRA	Lucas Rodrigues
12	FW	BRA	André Luis
13	DF	BRA	Matheus Silva
14	GK	BRA	Mateus Pasinato
16	MF	GBS	Sori Mané
17	FW	BRA	Yan (on loan from Palmeiras)

No.	Pos.	Nation	Player
19	DF	CAN	Steven Vitória
21	MF	POR	Filipe Soares
22	MF	POR	David Simão (on loan from AEK Athens)
25	DF	POR	Afonso Figueiredo
26	MF	POR	Alex Soares
27	MF	POR	Pedro Nuno
29	DF	BRA	Reynaldo
33	FW	BRA	Jefferson Galego
36	GK	POR	Miguel Oliveira
72	FW	BRA	Derik Lacerda
77	FW	BRA	Walterson
81	DF	POR	Pedro Amador
88	MF	POR	Gonçalo Franco
—	FW	BRA	Rafael Martins
—	DF	SEN	Abdoulaye Ba

=== Out on loan ===
Note: Flags indicate national team as defined under FIFA eligibility rules; some limited exceptions apply. Players may hold more than one non-FIFA nationality.

No.	Pos.	Nation	Player
—	MF	GHA	Mohammed Iddriss (at Leiria)
—	FW	GHA	Malik Abubakari (at Casa Pia)

== Pre-season and friendlies ==
Win Draw Loss Fixtures

== Competitions ==
=== Overview ===
Competition	First match	Last match	Starting round	Final position	Record							
Competition	First match	Last match	Starting round	Final position	Pld	W	D	L	GF	GA	GD	Win %
Primeira Liga	20 September 2020	May 2021	Matchday 1		22	7	8	7	22	26	−4	31.82
Taça de Portugal	22 November 2020	12 January 2021	Third round	Fifth round	3	2	0	1	5	5	+0	66.67
Total					25	9	8	8	27	31	−4	36.00

Last updated: 7 March 2021
Source: Soccerway

=== Primeira Liga ===
==== League table ====
Pos	Team	Pld	W	D	L	GF	GA	GD	Pts	Qualification or relegation
6	Santa Clara	34	13	7	14	44	36	+8	46	Qualification for the Europa Conference League second qualifying round (Note: Braga qualified for the Europa League group stage by winning the 2020–21 Taça de Portugal. Since they would have qualified for the Europa Conference League third qualifying round by finishing fourth, the berth was awarded to the fifth-placed team (Paços de Ferreira), and the Europa Conference League second qualifying round berth reserved to the fifth-placed team was awarded to the sixth-placed team (Santa Clara).)
7	Vitória de Guimarães	34	12	7	15	37	44	−7	43 (Note: Vitória de Guimarães are ranked ahead of Moreirense on head-to-head points: Vitória de Guimarães 4, Moreirense 1.)	
8	Moreirense	34	10	13	11	37	43	−6	43	
9	Famalicão	34	10	10	14	40	48	−8	40 (Note: Famalicão are ranked ahead of Belenenses SAD on head-to-head points: Famalicão 4, Belenenses SAD 1.)	
10	B-SAD	34	9	13	12	25	35	−10	40	

Source: Liga Portugal
Rules for classification: 1) Points; 2) Head-to-head points; 3) Head-to-head goal difference; 4) Head-to-head away goals scored; 5) Goal difference; 6) Matches won; 7) Goals scored; 8) Play-off.

==== Results summary ====
Overall								Home						Away					
Pld	W	D	L	GF	GA	GD	Pts	W	D	L	GF	GA	GD	W	D	L	GF	GA	GD
34	10	13	11	37	43	−6	43	4	10	3	24	23	+1	6	3	8	13	20	−7

Last updated: 19 May 2021.
Source: Liga Portugal

==== Results by round ====
Round	1
Ground	
Result	
Position	

Updated to match(es) played on 7 March 2021. Source: Liga Portugal
A = Away; H = Home; W = Win; D = Draw; L = Loss

==== Matches ====
The league fixtures were announced on 28 August 2020.

26 September 2020 2	Benfica	2–0	Moreirense	Lisbon
18:30 WEST (UTC+1)	Dias 20'; Pizzi (yellow card) 30'; Almeida (yellow card) 60'; Seferovic 80'	Report		Stadium: Estádio da Luz; Attendance: 0 Referee: Nuno Almeida

2 October 2020 3	Moreirense	1–1	Boavista	Braga
19:00 WEST (UTC+1)	Rosić (yellow card) 43'; Abreu 64'	Report	Gomes 9'; García (yellow card) 40'; Seabra (yellow card) 90'; Couto (red card)	Stadium: Parque Joaquim de Almeida Freitas; Attendance: 0 Referee: Manuel Mota

24 October 2020 7	Moreirense	0–1	Paços de Ferreira	Braga
15:30 WET (UTC±00:00)	Franco (yellow card) 51'	Report	Tanque 10'	Stadium: Parque Joaquim de Almeida Freitas; Attendance: 0 Referee: Hélder Malheiro

28 November 2020 8	Sporting CP	2–1	Moreirense	Lisbon
20:30 WET (UTC±0)	Gonçalves 8', 75'; Santos (yellow card) 78'	Report	Neto 3' (o.g.); Lacerda (yellow card) 74'; Galego (yellow card) 82'	Stadium: Estádio José Alvalade; Attendance: 0 Referee: Vítor Ferreira

29 December 2020 11	Moreirense	1–0	Santa Clara	Guimarães
18:45 WET (UTC±0)	F. Soares (yellow card) 11'; Yan 72'	Report	Moghanlou (yellow card) 34'; Anderson Carvalho (yellow card) 55'; Villanueva (yellow card) 81'; F. Cardoso (yellow card) 85'; Costinha (yellow card) 88'	Stadium: Parque de Jogos Comendador Joaquim de Almeida Freitas; Attendance: 0 Referee: Iancu Vasilica

3 January 2021 12	Porto	3–0	Moreirense	Porto
21:00 WET (UTC±0)	Oliveira 22' (pen.); Corona (yellow card) 30'; Martínez (yellow card) 82', (goal) 88'; Evanilson 90+1'	Report		Stadium: Estádio do Dragão; Attendance: 0 Referee: Manuel Mota

9 January 2021 13	Moreirense	2–2	Vitória de Guimarães	Braga
19:00 WET (UTC±0)	Pires 15'; A. Soares 70'; Pacheco (yellow card) 87'; D'Alberto (yellow card) 90+2'	Report	Edwards 20'; Quaresma (yellow card) 65'; André André 67'; Fernandes (yellow card) 85'; Mumin (yellow card) 90+3'	Stadium: Parque Joaquim de Almeida Freitas; Attendance: 0 Referee: Artur Soares Dias

1 February 2021 16	Moreirense	0–4	Braga	Moreira de Cónegos
19:45 WET (UTC±0)	Yan (yellow card) 86'; Vitória (yellow card) 89'	Report	Fransérgio 6', (yellow card) 41'; Castro 17'; Silva 22'; A. Horta 87'	Stadium: Parque Joaquim de Almeida Freitas; Attendance: 0 Referee: João Pinheiro

14 February 2021 19	Moreirense	1–1	Benfica	Moreira de Cónegos
20:15 WET (UTC±0)	Yan 40' (pen.); Ba (yellow card) 58'; Pacheco (yellow card) 70'	Report	Seferovic 25'; Grimaldo (yellow card) 38'; Weigl (yellow card) 65'; Otamendi (yellow card) 73'	Stadium: Parque Joaquim de Almeida Freitas; Attendance: 0 Referee: Manuel Oliveira

19 February 2021 20	Boavista	1–0	Moreirense	Porto
20:30 WET (UTC±0)	Gomes 53'; Gustavo Sauer (yellow card) 55'; Jardim (yellow card) 73'; Santos (yellow card) 80'		Simão (yellow card) 74'; D'Alberto (yellow card) 89'	Stadium: Estádio do Bessa; Attendance: 0 Referee: Artur Soares Dias
