= 2022–23 C.D. Mafra season =

C.D. Mafra
2022–23 season
- Chairman: José Cristo
- Head coach: Ricardo Sousa (until 7 February); Rui Borges (from 10 February 2023)
- Stadium: Estádio Municipal de Mafra
- Liga Portugal 2: 6th
- Taça de Portugal: Fourth round
- Taça da Liga: Group stage

The 2022–23 season is the 58th season in the history of C.D. Mafra and their fifth consecutive season in the second division of Portuguese football. The club are participating in the Liga Portugal 2, the Taça de Portugal, and the Taça da Liga. The season covers the period from 1 July 2022 to 30 June 2023.

== Players ==
As of 24 July 2022

Note: Flags indicate national team as defined under FIFA eligibility rules; some limited exceptions apply. Players may hold more than one non-FIFA nationality.

No.	Pos.	Nation	Player
1	GK	POR	Filipe Neves
2	DF	POR	Renato Matos
3	DF	POR	Bura
4	DF	POR	Pedro Pacheco
5	DF	BRA	Pedro Barcelos
6	MF	BRA	Kaio
7	FW	BRA	Pedro Lucas
8	MF	BRA	Mattheus Oliveira
9	FW	POR	Diogo Almeida
10	MF	POR	Pité
11	FW	BRA	Lucas Rodrigues (on loan from Casa Pia)
12	GK	POR	Samu Silva (on loan from Chaves)

No.	Pos.	Nation	Player
15	DF	POR	Guilherme Ferreira
17	FW	BRA	Murilo
18	MF	POR	Rodrigo Gui
20	MF	GBS	Zidane Banjaqui
21	MF	BRA	Leandrinho
23	GK	BRA	Renan
27	DF	POR	Diga
29	DF	COL	Edwin Banguera
34	DF	POR	João Goulart
39	DF	ANG	Kevin Ibouka
45	FW	ANG	Loide Augusto
99	FW	BRA	Vitor Gabriel
—	DF	AUS	Hosine Bility

== Pre-season and friendlies ==
Win Draw Loss Fixtures

16 July 2022 Friendly	Estoril (Portugal)	1–0	(Portugal) Mafra	Estoril
10:30 WEST (UTC+1)	Goal			Stadium: Estádio António Coimbra da Mota

16 July 2022 Friendly	Benfica B (Portugal)	0–1	(Portugal) Mafra	Seixal
19:00 WEST (UTC+1)				Stadium: Benfica Campus

20 July 2022 Friendly	Mafra (Portugal)	0–1	(Portugal) Casa Pia	TBD
10:30 WEST (UTC+1)

23 July 2022 Friendly	Mafra (Portugal)	2–3	(Portugal) Farense	Mafra
17:00 WEST (UTC+1)				Stadium: Estádio Municipal de Mafra

27 July 2022 Friendly	Mafra (Portugal)	1–0	(Portugal) Vilafranquense	TBD
10:00 WEST (UTC+1)

27 July 2022 Friendly	Mafra (Portugal)	1–2	(Angola) Petro de Luanda	TBD
18:00 WEST (UTC+1)

30 July 2022 Friendly	Mafra (Portugal)	2–0	(Portugal) Vitória de Setúbal	Mafra
10:00 WEST (UTC+1)				Stadium: Estádio Municipal de Mafra

23 September 2022 Friendly	Mafra (Portugal)	4–0	(Portugal) Belenenses	Mafra
--:-- WEST (UTC+1)				Stadium: Estádio Municipal de Mafra

== Competitions ==
=== Overall record ===
Competition	First match	Last match	Starting round	Final position	Record							
Competition	First match	Last match	Starting round	Final position	Pld	W	D	L	GF	GA	GD	Win %
Liga Portugal 2	6 August 2022	28 May 2023	Matchday 1	6th	34	12	11	11	46	49	−3	35.29
Taça de Portugal	2 October 2022	8 November 2022	Second round	Fourth round	3	2	0	1	5	5	+0	66.67
Taça da Liga	25 November 2022	16 December 2022	Group stage	Group stage	3	1	2	0	5	4	+1	33.33
Total					40	15	13	12	56	58	−2	37.50

Source: [ Soccerway]

=== Liga Portugal 2 ===
==== League table ====
Pos	Team	Pld	W	D	L	GF	GA	GD	Pts
4	Académico de Viseu	34	14	11	9	51	45	+6	53
5	Porto B (I)	34	14	9	11	48	40	+8	51
6	Mafra	34	12	11	11	46	49	−3	47
7	Vilafranquense	34	12	10	12	42	36	+6	46 (Note: Vilafranquense are ahead of Feirense on head-to-head points: Vilafranquense 1–0 Feirense, Feirense 1–2 Vilafranquense.)
8	Feirense	34	11	13	10	43	37	+6	46

Updated to match(es) played on 28 May 2023. Source: Liga Portugal 2
Rules for classification: 1) Points; 2) Head-to-head points; 3) Head-to-head goal difference; 4) Head-to-head away goals scored; 5) Goal difference; 6) Matches won; 7) Goals scored; 8) Play-off.
(I) Ineligible for promotion

==== Results summary ====
Overall								Home						Away					
Pld	W	D	L	GF	GA	GD	Pts	W	D	L	GF	GA	GD	W	D	L	GF	GA	GD
34	12	11	11	46	49	−3	47	6	6	5	23	22	+1	6	5	6	23	27	−4

Source: Liga Portugal

==== Results by round ====
Round	1
Ground	
Result	
Position	

Source: Liga Portugal
A = Away; H = Home; W = Win; D = Draw; L = Loss

==== Matches ====
The league fixtures were announced on 5 July 2022.

6 August 2022 1	Oliveirense	3–1	Mafra

15 August 2022 2	Mafra	3–0	Penafiel	Mafra
				Stadium: Estádio Municipal de Mafra

21 August 2022 3	Nacional	0–2	Mafra

29 August 2022 4	Mafra	0–3	Farense	Mafra
				Stadium: Estádio Municipal de Mafra

4 September 2022 5	Feirense	0–0	Mafra

10 September 2022 6	Mafra	0–1	Porto B	Mafra
				Stadium: Estádio Municipal de Mafra

17 September 2022 7	Académico de Viseu	2–0	Mafra

9 October 2022 8	Mafra	1–1	Tondela	Mafra
				Stadium: Estádio Municipal de Mafra

18 October 2022 9	Benfica B	5–1	Mafra

23 October 2022 10	Mafra	2–2	Estrela	Mafra
				Stadium: Estádio Municipal de Mafra

29 October 2022 11	Torreense	0–1	Mafra

4 November 2022 12	Mafra	3–2	Sporting Covilhã	Mafra
				Stadium: Estádio Municipal de Mafra

14 November 2022 13	Mafra	1–1	Leixões	Mafra
				Stadium: Estádio Municipal de Mafra

23 December 2022 14	Vilafranquense	3–3	Mafra

7 January 2023 15	Mafra	0–1	B-SAD	Mafra
				Stadium: Estádio Municipal de Mafra

13 January 2023 16	Moreirense	4–2	Mafra

21 January 2023 17	Mafra	1–0	Trofense	Mafra
				Stadium: Estádio Municipal de Mafra

29 January 2023 18	Mafra	2–3	Oliveirense

5 February 2023 19	Penafiel	1–0	Mafra

13 February 2023 20	Mafra	3–3	Nacional	Mafra
				Stadium: Estádio Municipal de Mafra

19 February 2023 21	Farense	1–0	Mafra

26 February 2023 22	Mafra	1–1	Feirense	Mafra
				Stadium: Estádio Municipal de Mafra

5 March 2023 23	Porto B	1–1	Mafra	Vila Nova de Gaia
15:30				Stadium: Estádio Luís Filipe Menezes

12 March 2023 24	Mafra	2–0	Académico de Viseu	Mafra
14:00				Stadium: Estádio Municipal de Mafra

19 March 2023 25	Tondela	1–2	Mafra	Tondela
11:00				Stadium: Estádio João Cardoso

1 April 2023 26	Mafra	1–1	Benfica B	Mafra
12:45				Stadium: Estádio Municipal de Mafra

7 April 2023 27	Estrela	2–2	Mafra	Amadora
15:30				Stadium: Estádio José Gomes

15 April 2023 28	Mafra	1–0	Torreense	Mafra
15:30				Stadium: Estádio Municipal de Mafra

24 April 2023 29	Sporting Covilhã	1–2	Mafra	Covilhã
18:00				Stadium: Estádio Municipal José dos Santos Pinto

30 April 2023 30	Leixões	0–2	Mafra	Matosinhos
11:00				Stadium: Estádio do Mar

6 May 2023 31	Mafra	2–1	Vilafranquense	Mafra
11:00				Stadium: Estádio Municipal de Mafra

13 May 2023 32	B-SAD	2–2	Mafra	Oeiras
11:00				Stadium: Estádio Nacional

21 May 2023 32	Mafra	0–2	Moreirense	Mafra
14:00				Stadium: Estádio Municipal de Mafra

28 May 2023 34	Trofense	1–2	Mafra	Trofa
15:30				Stadium: Estádio do Clube Desportivo Trofense
