= 2025 Sport Club do Recife season =

Sport Recife
2025 season
- Chairman: Yuri Romão (until 12 December)
- Manager: Pepa; António Oliveira; Daniel Paulista; César Lucena (c)
- Stadium: Ilha do Retiro
- Série A: 20th (Relegated)
- Pernambucano: Champions (45th title)
- Copa do Brasil: First round
- Copa do Nordeste: Quarter-finals
- Top goalscorer: League: Derik Lacerda (6); All: Pablo (9)
- Average home league attendance: 14,330
Home colours	Away colours	Third colours

The 2025 season was Sport Recife's 121st season in the club's history. Sport returned to Série A after three seasons in Série B, but was relegated at the end of the season, finishing the national league in last place. The club also competed in the Copa do Nordeste, Copa do Brasil and Campeonato Pernambucano winning their 45th title in history.

== Squad ==
As of 19 November 2025

Note: Flags indicate national team as defined under FIFA eligibility rules; some limited exceptions apply. Players may hold more than one non-FIFA nationality.

No.	Pos.	Nation	Player
1	GK	BRA	Gabriel (on loan from Vitória)
3	DF	BRA	Kevyson (on loan from Santos)
6	DF	POR	João Silva
7	FW	POR	Gonçalo Paciência
9	FW	URU	Colo Ramírez (on loan from Newell's Old Boys)
10	MF	BRA	Lucas Lima
11	FW	BRA	Romarinho
13	DF	BRA	Aderlan
14	MF	COL	Christian Rivera
15	DF	BRA	Rafael Thyere (captain)
16	DF	BRA	Igor Cariús
17	MF	BRA	Matheusinho (on loan from Santa Clara)
18	FW	BRA	Derik Lacerda (on loan from Cuiabá)
19	MF	BRA	Hyoran (on loan from Internacional)
20	FW	ARG	Rodrigo Atencio
21	MF	BRA	Lucas Kal

No.	Pos.	Nation	Player
22	GK	BRA	Caíque França
27	MF	POR	Sérgio Oliveira
28	MF	BRA	Pedro Augusto
30	FW	BRA	Chrystian Barletta
32	DF	BRA	Hereda (on loan from CRB)
33	DF	BRA	Matheus Alexandre
36	DF	BRA	Luan Cândido (on loan from Red Bull Bragantino)
38	FW	BRA	Léo Pereira (on loan from CRB)
40	DF	BRA	Ramon Menezes
41	GK	BRA	Davi
42	GK	BRA	Adriano
46	DF	BRA	Riquelme
48	DF	BRA	Felype Gabriel
58	MF	BRA	Zé Lucas
92	FW	BRA	Pablo
99	FW	BRA	Zé Roberto

== Statistics ==
=== Overall ===
Games played	61 (14 Pernambucano, 8 Copa do Nordeste, 1 Copa do Brasil, 38 Série A)
Games won	14 (8 Pernambucano, 4 Copa do Nordeste, 0 Copa do Brasil, 2 Série A)
Games drawn	16 (3 Pernambucano, 1 Copa do Nordeste, 1 Copa do Brasil, 11 Série A)
Games lost	31 (3 Pernambucano, 3 Copa do Nordeste, 0 Copa do Brasil, 25 Série A)
Goals scored	66
Goals conceded	94
Goal difference	–28
Best result (goal difference)	5–0 (H) v Maguary – Pernambucano – 2025.02.08; 5–0 (H) v Moto Club – Copa do Nordeste – 2025.02.19
Worst result (goal difference)	0–4 (H) v Cruzeiro – Série A – 2025.05.11; 0–4 (H) v Grêmio – Série A – 2025.12.07; 1–5 (H) v Flamengo – Série A – 2025.11.15
Top scorer	Pablo (9)

Source: Sport Recife official website

=== Goalscorers ===
Place	Pos.	Nat.	No.	Name	Campeonato Pernambucano	Copa do Nordeste	Copa do Brasil	Série A	Total
1	FW	(Brazil)	92	Pablo	5	1	0	3	9
2	MF	(Brazil)	77	Lenny Lobato	5	2	0	0	7
3	FW	(Brazil)	18	Derik Lacerda	0	0	0	6	6
4	FW	(Portugal)	7	Gonçalo Paciência	5	0	0	0	5
5	MF	(Brazil)	10	Lucas Lima	1	0	0	3	4
6	MF	(Brazil)	17	Carlos Alberto	2	1	0	0	3
6	FW	(Brazil)	30	Chrystian Barletta	0	1	0	2	3
6	MF	(Brazil)	38	Léo Pereira	0	0	0	3	3
6	MF	(Argentina)	20	Rodrigo Atencio	1	2	0	0	3
6	FW	(Brazil)	91	Romarinho	1	0	0	2	3
7	MF	(Uruguay)	8	Fabricio Domínguez	1	1	0	0	2
7	MF	(Brazil)	17	Matheusinho	0	0	0	2	2
7	MF	(Portugal)	27	Sérgio Oliveira	0	1	0	1	2
8	DF	(Brazil)	44	Chico	1	0	0	0	1
8	DF	(Brazil)	70	Felipinho	1	0	0	0	1
8	MF	(Brazil)	61	Gago	1	0	0	0	1
8	FW	(Brazil)	9	Gustavo Coutinho	1	0	0	0	1
8	MF	(Brazil)	11	Gustavo Maia	0	1	0	0	1
8	DF	(Brazil)	16	Igor Cariús	0	0	0	1	1
8	DF	(Portugal)	6	João Silva	1	0	0	0	1
8	DF	(Brazil)	36	Luan Cândido	0	0	0	1	1
8	DF	(Brazil)	43	Marcelo Ajul	1	0	0	0	1
8	DF	(Brazil)	33	Matheus Alexandre	0	1	0	0	1
8	DF	(Brazil)	15	Rafael Thyere	0	0	0	1	1
8	DF	(Brazil)	40	Ramon	0	0	0	1	1
				Own goals	0	0	0	2	2
				Total	27	11	0	28	66

=== Managers performance ===
Name	From	To	P	W	D	L	GF	GA	Avg%	Ref
(Brazil) César Lucena (c)	11 January 2025	18 January 2025	3	0	3	0	3	3	33%	
(Portugal) Pepa	22 January 2025	3 May 2025	26	12	3	11	39	26	50%	
(Portugal) António Oliveira	11 May 2025	1 June 2025	4	0	1	3	1	8	8%	
(Brazil) Daniel Paulista	9 July 2025	25 October 2025	19	2	9	8	17	28	26%	
(Brazil) César Lucena (c)	1 November 2025	7 December 2025	9	0	0	9	6	29	0%	

(c) Indicates the caretaker manager

== Official Competitions ==
=== Campeonato Pernambucano ===
==== First stage ====
11 January 2025 1	Afogados da Ingazeira	1–1	Sport	Afogados da Ingazeira
18:30 (UTC-3)	Rodrigo 64'	Report	Felipinho 90'	Stadium: Estádio Municipal Valdemar Viana de Araújo; Attendance: 1,072; Referee: Tiago Nascimento

14 January 2025 2	Sport	1–1	Decisão	Recife
20:00 (UTC-3)	Gago 82'	Report	Henrique Paraíba 66'	Stadium: Estádio Adelmar da Costa Carvalho (Ilha do Retiro); Attendance: 9,302; Referee: Deborah Cecília

18 January 2025 3	Sport	1–1	Retrô	Recife
16:30 (UTC-3)	Marcelo Ajul 69'	Report	Walce 53'	Stadium: Estádio Adelmar da Costa Carvalho (Ilha do Retiro); Attendance: 9,524; Referee: José Marciano Lopes da Silva Júnior

26 January 2025 4	Central	0–1	Sport	Caruaru
16:00 (UTC-3)		Report	Lenny Lobato 38'	Stadium: Estádio Luiz José de Lacerda (Lacerdão); Attendance: 6,606; Referee: Diego Fernando Silva de Lima

29 January 2025 5	Sport	4–1	Jaguar	Recife
20:00 (UTC-3)	Lenny Lobato 5'; Paciência 17', 28'; Gustavo Coutinho 75'	Report	Pedro Maycon 45+1'	Stadium: Estádio Adelmar da Costa Carvalho (Ilha do Retiro); Attendance: 10,014; Referee: Hugo Figueiredo

1 February 2025 6	Santa Cruz	1–0	Sport	Recife
16:30 (UTC-3)	Douglas Skilo 85'	Report		Stadium: Estádio José do Rego Maciel (Arruda); Attendance: 27,506; Referee: Rodrigo Klein

8 February 2025 7	Sport	5–0	Maguary	Recife
16:30 (UTC-3)	Lenny Lobato 50', 81'; Carlos Alberto 65'; Pablo 71', 90'	Report		Stadium: Estádio Adelmar da Costa Carvalho (Ilha do Retiro); Attendance: 9,938; Referee: Nairon Pereira

15 February 2025 8	Sport	1–2	Náutico	Recife
16:30 (UTC-3)	Paciência 90+10'	Report	Otusanya 16'; Igor Pereira 90+4'	Stadium: Estádio Adelmar da Costa Carvalho (Ilha do Retiro); Attendance: 13,023; Referee: Diego Fernando

22 February 2025 9	Petrolina	1–3	Sport	Petrolina
16:30 (UTC-3)	Marcus Brito 90+2'	Report	Atencio 23'; Paciência 41'; Pablo 65'	Stadium: Estádio Paulo de Souza Coelho; Attendance: 1,023; Referee: Luiz Sobral

==== Second stage ====
2 March 2025	Sport	3–0	Decisão	Recife
16:00 (UTC-3)	Pablo 74'; Romarinho 85'; Carlos Alberto 90+5'	Report		Stadium: Estádio Adelmar da Costa Carvalho (Ilha do Retiro); Attendance: 0 Referee: Rodrigo José Pereira de Lima

==== Semi-finals ====
8 March 2025	Sport	2–0	Santa Cruz	Recife
16:30 (UTC-3)	Paciência 28'; Silva 70'	Report		Stadium: Estádio Adelmar da Costa Carvalho (Ilha do Retiro); Attendance: 18,044; Referee: Rodrigo José Pereira de Lima

15 March 2025	Santa Cruz	0–1	Sport	Recife
16:30 (UTC-3)		Report	Domínguez 67'	Stadium: Estádio José do Rego Maciel (Arruda); Attendance: 30,025; Referee: Anderson Daronco

==== Finals ====
22 March 2025	Retrô	2–3	Sport	São Lourenço da Mata
16:30 (UTC-3)	Fernandinho 48'; Radsley 51'	Report	Lenny Lobato 9'; Lucas Lima 38' (pen.); Pablo 86'	Stadium: Estádio Governador Carlos Wilson Campos (Arena Pernambuco); Attendance: 13,233; Referee: Bruno Arleu de Araújo

2 April 2025	Sport	1–2 (4–2 p)	Retrô	Recife
21:30 (UTC-3)	Chico 25'	Report	Franklin Mascote 37'; Fernandinho 72'	Stadium: Estádio Adelmar da Costa Carvalho (Ilha do Retiro); Attendance: 24,884; Referee: Paulo Cesar Zavonelli
	Penalties
	Christian Rivera (penalty scored); Chico (penalty scored); João Silva (penalty scored); Carlos Alberto (penalty scored)		(penalty scored) Júnior Fialho; (penalty missed) Lucas Grafite; (penalty scored) Radsley; (penalty missed) Diego Guerra

==== Record ====
Final Position	Points	Matches	Wins	Draws	Losses	Goals For	Goals Away	Avg%
1st	27	14	8	3	3	27	12	64%

=== Copa do Nordeste ===
==== Group stage ====
Pos	Team	Pld	W	D	L	GF	GA	GD	Pts	Qualification
1	(Bahia) Vitória	7	4	3	0	10	6	+4	15	Advance to Quarter-finals
2	(Pernambuco) Sport	7	4	0	3	11	7	+4	12	Advance to Quarter-finals
3	(Ceará) Ferroviário	7	3	1	3	8	10	−2	10	Advance to Quarter-finals
4	(Ceará) Fortaleza	7	3	0	4	11	7	+4	9	Advance to Quarter-finals
5	(Alagoas) CRB	7	2	3	2	12	10	+2	9	

Source: CBF

22 January 2025 1	Ferroviário	1–2	Sport	Fortaleza
21:30 (UTC-3)	João Vitor 65'	Report	Gustavo Maia 63'; Matheus Alexandre 90+5'	Stadium: Estádio Presidente Vargas; Attendance: 1,177; Referee: Leonilson Fernandes Trigueiro Filho

4 February 2025 2	Sport	0–2	Fortaleza	Recife
21:30 (UTC-3)		Report	Moisés 51'; Breno Lopes 90+2'	Stadium: Estádio Adelmar da Costa Carvalho (Ilha do Retiro); Attendance: 11,200; Referee: Rafael Carlos Salgueiro Lima

11 February 2025 3	Sousa	1–2	Sport	Sousa
21:30 (UTC-3)	Diego Ceará 54'	Report	Lenny Lobato 8'; Atencio 90+2'	Stadium: Estádio Governador Antônio Mariz; Attendance: 3,774; Referee: Marcelo de Lima Henrique

19 February 2025 4	Sport	5–0	Moto Club	Recife
19:00 (UTC-3)	Chrystian Barletta 28'; Atencio 45'; Pablo 54'; Domínguez 60' (pen.); Carlos Alberto 85'	Report		Stadium: Estádio Adelmar da Costa Carvalho (Ilha do Retiro); Attendance: 8,637; Referee: Márcio dos Santos Oliveira

5 March 2025 5	Sport	2–1	CRB	Recife
21:30 (UTC-3)	Lenny Lobato 30'; Oliveira 38'	Report	Anselmo Ramon 33'	Stadium: Estádio Adelmar da Costa Carvalho (Ilha do Retiro); Attendance: 8,432; Referee: Leonilson Fernandes Trigueiro Filho

19 March 2025 6	Vitória	1–0	Sport	Salvador
21:30 (UTC-3)	Janderson 45+2'	Report		Stadium: Estádio Manoel Barradas (Barradão); Attendance: 10,011; Referee: Antônio Dib Moraes de Sousa

26 March 2025 7	Sport	0–1	Altos	Recife
21:30 (UTC-3)		Report	Jonathan 15' (pen.)	Stadium: Estádio Adelmar da Costa Carvalho (Ilha do Retiro); Attendance: 6,509; Referee: José Magno Teixeira do Nascimento

==== Quarter finals ====
9 July 2025	Sport	0–0 (2–4 p)	Ceará	Recife
21:30		Report		Stadium: Estádio Adelmar da Costa Carvalho (Ilha do Retiro); Attendance: 24,705; Referee: Afro Rocha de Carvalho Filho
	Penalties
	Christian Rivera (penalty missed); Lucas Lima (penalty missed); Rodrigo Atencio (penalty scored); Rafael Thyere (penalty scored)		(penalty scored) Pedro Raul; (penalty scored) Fernando Sobral; (penalty scored) Lourenço; (penalty missed) Matheus Araújo; (penalty scored) Matheus Bahia

==== Record ====
Final Position	Points	Matches	Wins	Draws	Losses	Goals For	Goals Away	Avg%
6th	13	8	4	1	3	11	7	54%

=== Copa do Brasil ===
==== First round ====
25 February 2025	Operário Várzea-Grandense	0–0 (4–2 p)	Sport	Cuiabá
21:30 (UTC-3)		Report		Stadium: Estádio Eurico Gaspar Dutra; Attendance: 1,511; Referee: Sávio Pereira Sampaio
	Penalties
	Castanha (penalty missed); Fabricio Lusa (penalty scored); Daniel Felipe (penalty scored); Lucas Matos (penalty scored); Vitor Gottems (penalty scored)		(penalty scored) Sérgio Oliveira; (penalty missed) Gonçalo Paciência; (penalty missed) Christian Rivera; (penalty scored) João Silva

==== Record ====
Final Position	Points	Matches	Wins	Draws	Losses	Goals For	Goals Away	Avg%
61st	1	1	0	1	0	0	0	33%

=== Série A ===
Pos	Team	Pld	W	D	L	GF	GA	GD	Pts	Qualification or relegation
16	Internacional	38	11	11	16	44	57	−13	44	
17	Ceará (R)	38	11	10	17	34	40	−6	43	Relegation to Campeonato Brasileiro Série B
18	Fortaleza (R)	38	11	10	17	44	58	−14	43	Relegation to Campeonato Brasileiro Série B
19	Juventude (R)	38	9	8	21	35	69	−34	35	Relegation to Campeonato Brasileiro Série B
20	Sport (R)	38	2	11	25	28	75	−47	17	Relegation to Campeonato Brasileiro Série B

Source: CBF
Rules for classification: 1) points; 2) wins; 3) goal difference; 4) goals scored; 5) head-to-head results (only between two teams); 6) fewest red cards; 7) fewest yellow cards; 8) drawing of lots.
(R) Relegated

==== Results summary ====
Overall								Home						Away					
Pld	W	D	L	GF	GA	GD	Pts	W	D	L	GF	GA	GD	W	D	L	GF	GA	GD
38	2	11	25	28	75	−47	17	1	7	11	17	39	−22	1	4	14	11	36	−25

==== Results by round ====
Round	1	2	3	4	5	6	7	8	9	10	11	12	13	14	15	16	17	18	19	20	21	22	23	24	25	26	27	28	29	30	31	32	33	34	35	36	37	38
Ground	A	H	A	H	A	H	A	H	A	H	A	H	A	A	H	A	H	H	A	H	A	H	A	H	A	H	A	H	A	H	A	H	H	A	H	A	A	H
Result	D	L	L	L	L	D	L	L	L	D	L	L	L	L	L	D	D	D	W	D	L	L	D	W	L	D	D	D	L	L	L	L	L	L	L	L	L	L
Position	12	18	20	20	20	20	20	20	20	20	20	20	20	20	20	20	20	20	20	20	20	20	20	20	20	20	20	20	20	20	20	20	20	20	20	20	20	20

A = Away; H = Home; W = Win; D = Draw; L = Loss

==== Matches ====
29 March 2025 1	São Paulo	0–0	Sport	São Paulo
18:30 (UTC-3)	Calleri (penalty missed) , 3'	Report		Stadium: Estádio Cícero Pompeu de Toledo (Morumbi); Attendance: 37,856; Referee: Felipe Fernandes de Lima

6 April 2025 2	Sport	1–2	Palmeiras	Recife
18:30 (UTC-3)	Chrystian Barletta 38'	Report	López 33' (pen.); Piquerez 90+1' (pen.)	Stadium: Estádio Adelmar da Costa Carvalho (Ilha do Retiro); Attendance: 26,324; Referee: Bruno Arleu de Araújo (Rio de Janeiro)

12 April 2025 3	Vasco da Gama	3–1	Sport	Rio de Janeiro
21:00 (UTC-3)	Vegetti 32', 41'; Rayan 83'	Report	Hugo Moura 55' (o.g.)	Stadium: Estádio Vasco da Gama (São Januário); Attendance: 15,969; Referee: Wilton Pereira Sampaio

16 April 2025 4	Sport	0–1	Red Bull Bragantino	Recife
19:00 (UTC-3)		Report	Juninho Capixaba 13'	Stadium: Estádio Adelmar da Costa Carvalho (Ilha do Retiro); Attendance: 12,621; Referee: Paulo Cesar Zanovelli da Silva

19 April 2025 5	Corinthians	2–1	Sport	São Paulo
16:00 (UTC-3)	Depay 46', 62'	Report	Oliveira 45'	Stadium: Neo Química Arena; Attendance: 44,257; Referee: Anderson Daronco

26 April 2025 6	Sport	0–0	Fortaleza	Recife
20:00 (UTC-3)		Report		Stadium: Estádio Adelmar da Costa Carvalho (Ilha do Retiro); Attendance: 13,515; Referee: Matheus Delgado Candançan

3 May 2025 7	Fluminense	2–1	Sport	Rio de Janeiro
18:30 (UTC-3)	Serna 60'; Everaldo 90+7'	Report	Pablo 24'	Stadium: Estádio Jornalista Mário Filho (Maracanã); Attendance: 18,754; Referee: Rafael Rodrigo Klein

11 May 2025 8	Sport	0–4	Cruzeiro	Recife
16:00 (UTC-3)		Report	Igor Cariús 8' (o.g.); Kaio Jorge 18'; Matheus Pereira 45+1', 53'	Stadium: Estádio Adelmar da Costa Carvalho (Ilha do Retiro); Attendance: 16,006; Referee: Raphael Claus

17 May 2025 9	Ceará	2–0	Sport	Fortaleza
16:00 (UTC-3)	Mugni 9'; Galeano 61'	Report		Stadium: Estádio Governador Plácido Castelo (Castelão); Attendance: 32,152; Referee: Gustavo Ervino Bauermann

25 May 2025 10	Sport	1–1	Internacional	Recife
16:00 (UTC-3)	Chrystian Barletta 7'	Report	Gustavo Prado 48'	Stadium: Estádio Adelmar da Costa Carvalho (Ilha do Retiro); Attendance: 21,921; Referee: Davi de Oliveira Lacerda

1 June 2025 11	Mirassol	1–0	Sport	Mirassol
11:00 (UTC-3)	Reinaldo 34' (pen.)	Report		Stadium: Estádio José Maria de Campos Maia; Attendance: 4,102; Referee: Lucas Casagrande

14 July 2025 13	Juventude	2–0	Sport	Caxias do Sul
20:00 (UTC-3)	Gilberto 12', 49'	Report		Stadium: Estádio Alfredo Jaconi; Attendance: 6,140; Referee: Jefferson Ferreira de Moraes

20 July 2025 15	Sport	0–1	Botafogo	Recife
17:30 (UTC-3)		Report	Cuiabano 90+1'	Stadium: Estádio Adelmar da Costa Carvalho (Ilha do Retiro); Attendance: 11,609; Referee: Flavio Rodrigues de Souza

23 July 2025 16	Vitória	2–2	Sport	Salvador
21:30 (UTC-3)	Erick 54'; López 90+4'	Report	Romarinho 89', 90+9'	Stadium: Estádio Manoel Barradas (Barradão); Attendance: 11,567; Referee: Lucas Canetto Bellote

26 July 2025 17	Sport	2–2	Santos	Recife
18:30 (UTC-3)	Derik Lacerda 4'; Caballero 70' (o.g.)	Report	Gabriel Bontempo 79'; João Basso 88'	Stadium: Estádio Adelmar da Costa Carvalho (Ilha do Retiro); Attendance: 26,018; Referee: Rafael Rodrigo Klein

2 August 2025 18	Sport	0–0	Bahia	Recife
16:00 (UTC-3)		Report		Stadium: Estádio Adelmar da Costa Carvalho (Ilha do Retiro); Attendance: 16,080; Referee: Anderson Daronco

10 August 2025 19	Grêmio	0–1	Sport	Porto Alegre
20:30 (UTC-3)		Report	Matheusinho 51'	Stadium: Arena do Grêmio; Attendance: 35,087; Referee: Yuri Elino Ferreira da Cruz

16 August 2025 20	Sport	2–2	São Paulo	Recife
18:30 (UTC-3)	Lucas Lima 5'; Derik Lacerda 50'	Report	Lucas 66'; Maik 90+1'	Stadium: Estádio Adelmar da Costa Carvalho (Ilha do Retiro); Attendance: 26,104; Referee: Lucas Paulo Torezin

25 August 2025 21	Palmeiras	3–0	Sport	São Paulo
19:00 (UTC-3)	López 14', 56'; Gómez 59'	Report		Stadium: Allianz Parque; Attendance: 36,588; Referee: Paulo Cesar Zanovelli da Silva

31 August 2025 22	Sport	2–3	Vasco da Gama	Recife
20:30 (UTC-3)	Lucas Lima 25' (pen.); Ramon 74'	Report	Nuno Moreira 8'; Philippe Coutinho 43'; Vegetti 49' (pen.)	Stadium: Estádio Adelmar da Costa Carvalho (Ilha do Retiro); Attendance: 15,434; Referee: Raphael Claus

14 September 2025 23	Red Bull Bragantino	1–1	Sport	Bragança Paulista
11:00 (UTC-3)	Eduardo Sasha 57' (pen.)	Report	Derik Lacerda 90+3'	Stadium: Estádio Nabi Abi Chedid; Attendance: 3,564; Referee: Anderson Daronco

21 September 2025 24	Sport	1–0	Corinthians	Recife
17:30 (UTC-3)	Matheusinho 49'	Report		Stadium: Estádio Adelmar da Costa Carvalho (Ilha do Retiro); Attendance: 26,504; Referee: Sávio Pereira Sampaio

27 September 2025 25	Fortaleza	1–0	Sport	Fortaleza
16:00 (UTC-3)	Lucas Sasha 44'	Report		Stadium: Estádio Governador Plácido Castelo (Castelão); Attendance: 28,123; Referee: Davi de Oliveira Lacerda

1 October 2025 26	Sport	2–2	Fluminense	Recife
19:00 (UTC-3)	Lucas Lima 73'; Luan Cândido 90+7'	Report	Acosta 64'; John Kennedy 83' (pen.)	Stadium: Estádio Adelmar da Costa Carvalho (Ilha do Retiro); Attendance: 14,172; Referee: Raphael Claus

5 October 2025 27	Cruzeiro	1–1	Sport	Belo Horizonte
20:30 (UTC-3)	Gabriel Barbosa 59'	Report	Derik Lacerda 41'	Stadium: Estádio Governador Magalhães Pinto (Mineirão); Attendance: 50,969; Referee: Jefferson Ferreira de Moraes

8 October 2025 14*	Atlético Mineiro	3–1	Sport	Belo Horizonte
19:00 (UTC-3)	Vitor Hugo 9'; Guilherme Arana 38'; Rony 62'	Report	Derik Lacerda 82' (pen.)	Stadium: Arena MRV; Attendance: 25,093; Referee: Alex Gomes Stefano

15 October 2025 28	Sport	1–1	Ceará	Recife
20:00 (UTC-3)	Igor Cariús 86'	Report	Pedro Raul 82'	Stadium: Estádio Adelmar da Costa Carvalho (Ilha do Retiro); Attendance: 14,494; Referee: Savio Pereira Sampaio

19 October 2025 29	Internacional	2–0	Sport	Porto Alegre
18:30 (UTC-3)	Borré 24'; Bruno Henrique 68'	Report		Stadium: Estádio José Pinheiro Borda (Beira-Rio); Attendance: 20,781; Referee: Lucas Paulo Torezin

25 October 2025 30	Sport	1–2	Mirassol	Recife
18:30 (UTC-3)	Derik Lacerda 38'	Report	Negueba 28'; Guilherme 47'	Stadium: Estádio Adelmar da Costa Carvalho (Ilha do Retiro); Attendance: 10,656; Referee: Jefferson Ferreira de Moraes

1 November 2025 31	Flamengo	3–0	Sport	Rio de Janeiro
21:00 (UTC-3)	Bruno Henrique 51', 60' de Arrascaeta 67'	Report		Stadium: Estádio Jornalista Mário Filho (Maracanã); Attendance: 67,598; Referee: Fernando Mendes de Salles Nascimento Filho

5 November 2025 32	Sport	0–2	Juventude	Recife
19:00 (UTC-3)		Report	Gabriel Taliari 45+2'; Ênio 79'	Stadium: Estádio Adelmar da Costa Carvalho (Ilha do Retiro); Attendance: 4,919; Referee: André Luiz Skettino Policarpo Bento

8 November 2025 33	Sport	2–4	Atlético Mineiro	Recife
16:00 (UTC-3)	Léo Pereira 18', 63'	Report	Hulk 68'; Rony 70', 83'; Alexsander 81'	Stadium: Estádio Adelmar da Costa Carvalho (Ilha do Retiro); Attendance: 5,095; Referee: Matheus Delgado Candançan

15 November 2025 12*	Sport	1–5	Flamengo	São Lourenço da Mata
18:30 (UTC-3)	Pablo 15'	Report	Luiz Araújo 41'; Juninho 61'; Bruno Henrique 63'; Ayrton Lucas 71'; Douglas Telles 80'	Stadium: Estádio Governador Carlos Wilson Campos (Arena Pernambuco); Attendance: 19,706; Referee: Rafael Rodrigo Klein

18 November 2025 34	Botafogo	3–2	Sport	Rio de Janeiro
20:30 (UTC-3)	Artur 30'; Barría 58', 90+5'	Report	Léo Pereira 14'; Rafael Thyere 28'	Stadium: Estádio Olímpico Nilton Santos (Engenhão); Attendance: 12,120; Referee: Bruno Pereira Vasconcelos

23 November 2025 35	Sport	1–3	Vitória	Recife
18:30 (UTC-3)	Pablo 29'	Report	Luan Cândido 13' (o.g.); Cantalapiedra 15'; Renato Kayzer 48'	Stadium: Estádio Adelmar da Costa Carvalho (Ilha do Retiro); Attendance: 3,813; Referee: Yuri Elino Ferreira da Cruz

28 November 2025 36	Santos	3–0	Sport	Santos
21:30 (UTC-3)	Neymar 25'; Lucas Kal 36' (o.g.); João Schmidt 67'	Report		Stadium: Estádio Urbano Caldeira (Vila Belmiro); Attendance: 14,156; Referee: Felipe Fernandes de Lima

3 December 2025 37	Bahia	2–0	Sport	Salvador
20:00 (UTC-3)	Rodrigo Nestor 40'; Willian José (penalty missed) , 45+6'; Luciano Juba 54'	Report		Stadium: Casa de Apostas Arena Fonte Nova; Attendance: 39,847; Referee: Flávio Rodrigues de Souza

7 December 2025 38	Sport	0–4	Grêmio	Recife
16:00 (UTC-3)		Report	Carlos Vinícius 29', 31'; Gustavo Martins 42'; Cristaldo 48'	Stadium: Estádio Adelmar da Costa Carvalho (Ilha do Retiro); Attendance: 3,339; Referee: Edina Alves Batista

(*) Postponed matches due to changes in competition schedules

==== Record ====
Final Position	Points	Matches	Wins	Draws	Losses	Goals For	Goals Away	Avg%
20th	17	38	2	11	25	28	75	15%
