= 2012–13 Primeira Liga =

79th season of top-tier Portuguese football

Primeira Liga
- Season: 2012–13
- Dates: 17 August 2012 – 19 May 2013
- Champions: Porto; 27th title
- Relegated: Moreirense; Beira-Mar
- Champions League: Porto; Benfica; Paços de Ferreira
- Europa League: Vitória de Guimarães; Braga; Estoril
- Matches: 240
- Goals: 667 (2.78 per match)
- Best player: Jackson Martínez
- Top goalscorer: Jackson Martínez (26 goals)
- Best goalkeeper: Helton
- Biggest home win: Porto 5–0 Marítimo; Vitória de Setúbal 5–0 Moreirense; Porto 5–0 Gil Vicente; Benfica 5–0 Gil Vicente; Benfica 6–1 Rio Ave
- Biggest away win: Vitória de Setúbal 0–5 Benfica; Moreirense 0–5 Paços de Ferreira
- Highest scoring: Braga 4–4 Olhanense; Vitória de Setúbal 3–5 Rio Ave
- Longest winning run: Benfica 9 games (28 September 2012 – 6 January 2013; 17 February – 29 April 2013)
- Longest unbeaten run: Porto 30 games (19 August 2012 – 19 May 2013)
- Longest winless run: Moreirense 14 games (2 September 2012 – 27 January 2013)
- Longest losing run: Vitória de Setúbal 5 games (2 March – 7 April 2013)
- Highest attendance: 62,553; Benfica 2–0 Sporting CP (21 April 2013)
- Lowest attendance: 1,221; Paços de Ferreira 1–1 Moreirense (19 August 2012)
- Total attendance: 2,343,284
- Average attendance: 9,764

The 2012–13 Primeira Liga (also known as Liga ZON Sagres for sponsorship reasons) was the 79th season of the Primeira Liga, the top professional league for Portuguese association football clubs. It began on 19 August 2012 and concluded on 19 May 2013. Sixteen teams contested the league, fourteen of which took part in the previous season and two of which were promoted from the Liga de Honra. Porto were the defending champions and secured their third consecutive and 27th overall title, after completing their second unbeaten season in three years. Porto striker Jackson Martínez was the top scorer with 26 goals.

== Teams ==
A total of sixteen teams contested the league, fourteen of which were present in the 2011–12 Primeira Liga and two of which were promoted from the 2011–12 Liga de Honra. The two relegated teams after the 2011–12 season were Feirense and União de Leiria, which returned to the Liga de Honra after one and three years, respectively, in the top level. Replacing them in the top-flight division were 2011–12 Liga de Honra champions Estoril and runners-up Moreirense, both returning after a seven-year absence. Estoril contested their 21st season in the Primeira Liga, while Moreirense participated only for the fourth time.

=== Stadia and locations ===
Location of teams in the 2012–13 Liga ZON Sagres
Location of teams in the 2012–13 Liga ZON Sagres

Team	Home city	Stadium	Capacity	2011–12	Current spell
Académica	Coimbra	Estádio Cidade de Coimbra	30,210	13th	2002–03
Benfica	Lisbon	Estádio da Luz	65,467	2nd	1934–35
Beira-Mar	Aveiro	Estádio Municipal de Aveiro	30,127	12th	2010–11
Braga	Braga	Estádio Municipal de Braga	30,152	3rd	1974–75
Estoril	Estoril	Estádio António Coimbra da Mota	8,000	Liga de Honra, 1st	2012–13
Gil Vicente	Barcelos	Estádio Cidade de Barcelos	12,374	9th	2011–12
Marítimo	Funchal	Estádio dos Barreiros	8,922	5th	1985–86
Moreirense	Moreira de Cónegos	Parque de Jogos Comendador Joaquim de Almeida Freitas	9,000	Liga de Honra, 2nd	2012–13
Nacional	Funchal	Estádio da Madeira	5,132	7th	2002–03
Olhanense	Olhão	Estádio José Arcanjo	11,622	8th	2009–10
Paços de Ferreira	Paços de Ferreira	Estádio da Mata Real	5,255	10th	2005–06
Porto	Porto	Estádio do Dragão	50,399	Champion	1934–35
Rio Ave	Vila do Conde	Estádio dos Arcos	12,815	14th	2008–09
Sporting CP	Lisbon	Estádio José Alvalade	50,080	4th	1934–35
Vitória de Guimarães	Guimarães	Estádio D. Afonso Henriques	30,165	6th	2007–08
Vitória de Setúbal	Setúbal	Estádio do Bonfim	18,692	11th	2004–05

=== Personnel and kits ===
Note: Flags indicate national team as has been defined under FIFA eligibility rules. Players and Managers may hold more than one non-FIFA nationality.

Team	Head coach	Captain	Kit manufacturer	Shirt sponsor
Académica	(Portugal) Pedro Emanuel	(Portugal) Orlando	Nike	EFAPEL
Beira-Mar	(Portugal) Costinha	(Portugal) Hugo Vieira	Hummel	32 Group
Benfica	(Portugal) Jorge Jesus	(Brazil) Luisão	Adidas	MEO (H) / TMN (A)
Braga	(Portugal) José Peseiro	(Brazil) Alan	Macron	AXA
Estoril	(Portugal) Marco Silva	(Brazil) Vagner	Joma	Gelpeixe
Gil Vicente	(Portugal) Paulo Alves	(Portugal) Paulo Arantes	Macron	Carnes Campicarn
Marítimo	(Portugal) Pedro Martins	(Portugal) Briguel	Lacatoni	Banif
Moreirense	(Portugal) Augusto Inácio	(Portugal) Francisco Castro	Cdt	
Nacional	(Portugal) Manuel Machado	(Portugal) Moreno	Hummel	Banif
Olhanense	(Portugal) Manuel Cajuda	(Portugal) Rui Duarte	Lacatoni	Casais, SA
Paços de Ferreira	(Portugal) Paulo Fonseca	(Portugal) Filipe Anunciação	Lacatoni	Capital do Móvel
Porto	(Portugal) Vítor Pereira	(Brazil) Helton	Nike	MEO (H) / TMN (A)
Rio Ave	(Portugal) Nuno Espírito Santo	(Portugal) José Gaspar	Lacatoni	ASC ENGENHARIA E CONSTRUÇÃO
Sporting CP	(Portugal) Jesualdo Ferreira	(Portugal) Rui Patrício	Puma	TMN (H) / MEO (A)
Vitória de Guimarães	(Portugal) Rui Vitória	(Portugal) Alex	Lacatoni	Espaço Guimarães / Smile.Up / Super Bock
Vitória de Setúbal	(Portugal) José Mota	(Portugal) Ricardo Silva	Lacatoni	Kia

=== Managerial changes ===
Team	Outgoing manager	Manner of departure	Date of vacancy	Replaced by	Date of appointment	Position in table
Paços de Ferreira	(Portugal) Henrique Calisto	Resigned	12 May 2012	(Portugal) Paulo Fonseca	25 May 2012	Pre-season
Sporting CP	(Portugal) Ricardo Sá Pinto	Resigned	5 October 2012	(Portugal) Oceano	5 October 2012	7th
Nacional	(Portugal) Pedro Caixinha	Sacked	11 October 2012	(Portugal) Manuel Machado	13 October 2012	14th
Sporting CP	(Portugal) Oceano	Replaced	24 October 2012	(Belgium) Franky Vercauteren	24 October 2012	12th
Olhanense	(Portugal) Sérgio Conceição	Resigned	7 January 2013	(Portugal) Manuel Cajuda	8 January 2013	8th
Sporting CP	(Belgium) Franky Vercauteren	Resigned	7 January 2013	(Portugal) Jesualdo Ferreira	7 January 2013	12th
Moreirense	(Portugal) Jorge Casquilha	Resigned	30 January 2013	(Portugal) Augusto Inácio	30 January 2013	16th
Beira-Mar	(Portugal) Ulisses Morais	Resigned	16 February 2013	(Portugal) Costinha	18 February 2013	15th
Académica	(Portugal) Pedro Emanuel	Sacked	7 April 2013	(Portugal) Sérgio Conceição	8 April 2013	14th
Olhanense	(Portugal) Manuel Cajuda	Resigned	1 May 2013	(Portugal) Bruno Saraiva	1 May 2013	15th

== League table ==
Pos	Team	Pld	W	D	L	GF	GA	GD	Pts	Qualification or relegation
1	Porto (C)	30	24	6	0	70	14	+56	78	Qualification for the Champions League group stage
2	Benfica	30	24	5	1	77	20	+57	77	Qualification for the Champions League group stage
3	Paços de Ferreira	30	14	12	4	42	29	+13	54	Qualification for the Champions League play-off round
4	Braga	30	16	4	10	60	44	+16	52	Qualification for the Europa League play-off round
5	Estoril	30	13	6	11	47	37	+10	45	Qualification for the Europa League third qualifying round
6	Rio Ave	30	12	6	12	35	42	−7	42 (Note: Rio Ave ahead of Sporting CP on head-to-head record; Rio Ave–Sporting CP 2–1, Sporting CP–Rio Ave 0–1)	
7	Sporting CP	30	11	9	10	36	36	0	42	
8	Nacional	30	11	7	12	45	51	−6	40 (Note: Nacional ahead of Vitória de Guimarães on head-to-head record; Nacional–Vitória de Guimarães 2–1, Vitória de Guimarães–Nacional 1–3)	
9	Vitória de Guimarães	30	11	7	12	36	47	−11	40	Qualification for the Europa League group stage (Note: Vitória de Guimarães qualified for the group stage of 2013–14 UEFA Europa League after winning the 2012–13 Taça de Portugal.)
10	Marítimo	30	9	11	10	34	45	−11	38	
11	Académica	30	6	10	14	33	45	−12	28	
12	Vitória de Setúbal	30	7	5	18	30	55	−25	26	
13	Gil Vicente	30	6	7	17	31	54	−23	25 (Note: Gil Vicente ahead of Olhanense on head-to-head record; Gil Vicente–Olhanense 2–0, Olhanense–Gil Vicente 2–2)	
14	Olhanense	30	5	10	15	26	42	−16	25	
15	Moreirense (R)	30	5	9	16	30	51	−21	24	Relegation to Segunda Liga
16	Beira-Mar (R)	30	5	8	17	35	55	−20	23	Relegation to Segunda Liga

Source: LPFP (in Portuguese)
Rules for classification: 1) Points; 2) Head-to-head points; 3) Head-to-head goal difference; 4) Head-to-head away goals scored; 5) Goal difference; 6) Matches won; 7) Goals scored; 8) Play-off.
(Note: LPFP decided that only criteria 1, 5, 6 and 7 would be applied to establish the classification during the competition.)
(C) Champions; (R) Relegated

=== Positions by round ===
Team ╲ Round	1	2	3	4	5	6	7	8	9	10	11	12	13	14	15	16	17	18	19	20	21	22	23	24	25	26	27	28	29	30
Porto	11	2	2	1	2	1	2	1	1	1	2	2	2	2	2	1	1	1	1	1	2	2	2	2	2	2	2	2	1	1
Benfica	5	1	1	2	1	2	1	2	2	2	1	1	1	1	1	2	2	2	2	2	1	1	1	1	1	1	1	1	2	2
Paços de Ferreira	9	9	4	4	6	9	6	5	4	5	5	4	4	4	4	4	3	3	3	3	3	4	4	3	3	3	3	3	3	3
Braga	5	3	6	3	3	3	3	3	3	3	3	3	3	3	3	3	4	4	4	4	4	3	3	4	4	4	4	4	4	4
Estoril	15	11	11	5	5	11	14	8	6	6	6	6	7	6	7	7	8	6	8	7	7	8	5	6	5	6	5	6	5	5
Rio Ave	16	7	8	13	11	5	4	4	5	4	4	5	5	5	5	5	5	5	5	5	5	5	6	9	8	10	8	8	8	6
Sporting CP	11	12	12	7	7	12	10	13	10	8	9	10	12	8	8	9	9	10	9	11	10	10	10	8	7	9	7	7	7	7
Nacional	5	14	16	15	13	15	15	16	14	9	10	11	14	9	12	11	11	11	11	9	9	9	9	7	10	7	9	9	9	8
Vitória de Guimarães	11	15	14	9	14	7	5	6	8	7	7	7	6	7	6	6	6	8	7	8	8	6	7	10	9	5	6	5	6	9
Marítimo	2	6	5	8	12	6	9	11	12	13	8	9	10	10	9	10	10	7	6	6	6	7	8	5	6	8	10	10	10	10
Académica	3	8	9	11	4	8	8	10	13	14	15	15	11	14	10	8	7	9	10	12	12	12	12	12	13	13	13	11	11	11
Vitória de Setúbal	5	16	15	10	9	10	11	7	7	10	11	15	15	12	15	15	15	14	12	10	11	11	11	11	11	11	11	12	12	12
Gil Vicente	11	10	10	14	8	4	7	9	11	12	13	13	13	15	11	13	12	12	13	13	13	13	14	15	12	12	12	13	13	13
Olhanense	1	5	7	12	15	14	13	12	9	11	12	12	8	13	14	12	13	13	14	14	14	14	15	13	14	14	14	14	14	14
Moreirense	9	4	3	6	10	13	12	14	15	15	16	16	16	16	16	16	16	16	16	16	15	15	13	14	15	15	15	16	15	15
Beira-Mar	3	13	13	16	16	16	16	15	16	16	14	8	9	11	13	14	14	15	15	15	16	16	16	16	16	16	16	15	16	16

Leader
2013–14 UEFA Champions League Group stage
2013–14 UEFA Champions League Play-off round
2013–14 UEFA Europa League Play-off round
2013–14 UEFA Europa League Third qualifying round
Relegation to 2013–14 Segunda Liga

== Results ==
Home \ Away	ACA	BEM	BEN	BRA	ESP	GVI	MAR	MOR	NAC	OLH	PAÇ	POR	RAV	SCP	VGU	VSE
Académica		3–1	2–2	1–4	0–2	2–2	2–3	1–0	2–1	1–1	1–1	0–3	1–2	1–1	1–2	4–2
Beira-Mar	3–3		0–1	3–3	0–1	1–0	4–2	1–1	2–2	0–1	0–2	0–2	3–1	1–4	2–2	1–1
Benfica	1–0	2–1		2–2	1–1	5–0	4–1	3–1	3–0	2–0	3–0	2–2	6–1	2–0	3–0	3–0
Braga	1–0	3–1	1–2		3–0	3–1	2–0	1–0	1–3	4–4	2–3	0–2	4–1	2–3	3–2	4–1
Estoril	2–0	2–1	1–3	2–1		1–2	3–1	2–0	4–0	3–3	1–1	1–2	1–3	3–1	2–0	3–0
Gil Vicente	2–1	1–2	0–3	1–3	1–3		4–2	4–3	1–2	2–0	0–1	0–0	0–1	2–3	0–0	0–0
Marítimo	0–2	1–1	1–2	0–2	2–1	0–0		1–1	2–0	1–0	1–1	1–1	1–1	1–1	1–0	1–1
Moreirense	2–2	3–0	0–2	2–3	1–1	0–0	0–1		3–1	1–1	0–5	0–3	0–1	2–2	0–1	2–1
Nacional	2–1	2–4	2–2	3–2	1–0	0–1	1–1	1–2		3–1	3–3	1–3	1–1	1–1	2–1	2–2
Olhanense	0–0	1–0	0–2	0–1	2–1	2–2	0–0	2–2	1–2		1–2	2–3	1–0	0–2	1–2	0–1
Paços de Ferreira	1–0	1–1	1–2	2–0	1–0	3–2	2–2	1–1	1–1	0–0		0–2	2–1	1–0	2–1	2–0
Porto	2–1	4–0	2–1	3–1	2–0	5–0	5–0	1–0	1–0	1–1	2–0		2–1	2–0	4–0	2–0
Rio Ave	0–0	2–1	0–1	1–1	0–2	2–1	0–1	0–1	2–1	0–1	0–0	2–2		2–1	1–3	2–1
Sporting CP	0–0	1–0	1–3	1–0	2–2	2–1	0–1	3–2	2–1	1–0	0–1	0–0	0–1		1–1	2–1
Vitória de Guimarães	2–0	2–1	0–4	0–2	2–2	3–1	1–1	1–0	1–3	2–0	2–2	0–4	0–1	0–0		2–1
Vitória de Setúbal	0–1	1–0	0–5	0–1	1–0	1–0	2–4	5–0	0–2	1–0	0–0	0–3	3–5	2–1	2–3	

Source: LPFP (in Portuguese)
Legend: Blue = home team win; Yellow = draw; Red = away team win.

== Season statistics ==
=== Top goalscorers ===
Rank	Player	Club	Goals
1	(Colombia) Jackson Martínez	Porto	26
2	(Brazil) Lima	Benfica	20
3	(Paraguay) Óscar Cardozo	Benfica	17
4	(Netherlands) Ricky van Wolfswinkel	Sporting CP	14
5	(Cameroon) Albert Meyong	Vitória de Setúbal	13
5	(Portugal) Eder	Braga	13
5	(Portugal) Edinho	Académica	13
5	(Algeria) Nabil Ghilas	Moreirense	13
9	(Canada) Steven Vitória	Estoril	11
10	(Colombia) James Rodríguez	Porto	10
10	(Argentina) Eduardo Salvio	Benfica	10
10	(São Tomé and Príncipe) Luís Leal	Estoril	10

=== Hat-tricks ===
Player	For	Against	Result	Date
(São Tomé and Príncipe) Luís Leal	Estoril	Marítimo	3–1	24 September 2012
(Portugal) João Tomás	Rio Ave	Vitória de Setúbal	3–5	25 November 2012
(Cameroon) Albert Meyong	Vitória de Setúbal	Rio Ave	3–5	25 November 2012
(Paraguay) Óscar Cardozo	Benfica	Sporting CP	1–3	10 December 2012
(Paraguay) Óscar Cardozo	Benfica	Marítimo	4–1	15 December 2012
(Portugal) Edinho	Académica	Vitória de Setúbal	4–2	5 January 2013
(Cameroon) Albert Meyong	Vitória de Setúbal	Moreirense	5–0	13 January 2013
(Colombia) Jackson Martínez	Porto	Vitória de Guimarães	4–0	2 February 2013
(Brazil) Lima	Benfica	Rio Ave	6–1	30 March 2013
(Netherlands) Ricky van Wolfswinkel	Sporting CP	Braga	2–3	1 April 2013

== Awards ==
=== Monthly awards ===
==== SJPF Player of the Month ====
Month	Player	Club
August/September	(Colombia) James Rodríguez	Porto
October/November	(Colombia) Jackson Martínez	Porto
December/January	(Serbia) Nemanja Matić	Benfica
February	(Colombia) Jackson Martínez	Porto
March	(Brazil) Lima	Benfica
April	(Serbia) Nemanja Matić	Benfica

==== SJPF Young Player of the Month ====
Month	Player	Club
August/September	(Portugal) Miguel Lourenço	Vitória de Setúbal
October/November	(Portugal) Flávio Ferreira	Académica
December/January	(Portugal) David Simão	Marítimo
February	(Portugal) Josué	Paços de Ferreira
March	(Portugal) Tiago Ilori	Sporting CP
April	(Portugal) Amido Baldé	Vitória de Guimarães

== Attendances ==
#	Club	Average	Highest
1	Benfica	42,366	62,553
2	Porto	30,278	50,117
3	Sporting	26,521	35,114
4	Vitória SC	12,877	26,340
5	Braga	12,061	18,401
6	Académica	4,681	12,739
7	Gil Vicente	4,230	8,298
8	Beira-Mar	4,159	18,730
9	Marítimo	3,706	4,504
10	Vitória FC	3,169	10,569
11	Olhanense	2,470	9,498
12	Rio Ave	2,137	5,028
13	CD Nacional	2,090	4,327
14	Moreirense	2,083	4,139
15	Paços de Ferreira	2,055	4,928
16	Estoril	1,970	5,015

== See also ==
- List of Portuguese football transfers summer 2012
- List of Portuguese football transfers winter 2012–13
