= 2022–23 SD Ponferradina season =

SD Ponferradina
2022–23 season
- President: José Fernández Nieto
- Head coach: José Manuel Gomes (until 19 November); David Gallego (from 20 November)
- Stadium: Estadio El Toralín
- Segunda División: 19th
- Copa del Rey: First round
- Top goalscorer: League: Dani Ojeda (4); All: Dani Ojeda (4)
Home colours	Away colours	Third colours
- All statistics correct as of 5 December 2022.

The 2022–23 season is the 101st season in the history of SD Ponferradina and their fourth consecutive season in the second division. The club are participating in Segunda División and the Copa del Rey.

== Players ==
As of 20 November 2022.

Note: Flags indicate national team as defined under FIFA eligibility rules; some limited exceptions apply. Players may hold more than one non-FIFA nationality.

No.	Pos.	Nation	Player
1	GK	IRI	Amir Abedzadeh
2	DF	POR	Aldair Neves
3	DF	ESP	Adrián Diéguez
4	DF	ROU	Alex Pașcanu
5	DF	ESP	José María Amo
7	FW	ESP	Dani Ojeda
8	MF	ESP	Agus Medina
10	FW	BRA	Yuri de Souza (captain)
11	MF	NGR	Kelechi Nwakali
12	DF	BEL	Jordan Lukaku
13	GK	GEO	Georgi Makaridze

No.	Pos.	Nation	Player
14	DF	ESP	Ricard Pujol
15	DF	ESP	Adri Castellano
16	DF	ESP	Moi Delgado
17	FW	POR	Heriberto Tavares (on loan from Famalicão)
18	MF	ESP	Erik Morán
19	FW	ESP	Edu Espiau
20	FW	ESP	José Naranjo
21	DF	ESP	Ale Díez
22	DF	ESP	Paris Adot (vice-captain)
23	FW	BRA	Derik Lacerda
24	MF	GHA	Sabit Abdulai (on loan from Getafe)

== Transfers ==
=== In ===
Date	Player	From	Type	Fee	Ref
8 August 2022	(Ghana) Sabit Abdulai	Getafe	Loan		
1 September 2022	(Spain) Hugo Vallejo	Real Valladolid	Loan		

=== Out ===
Date	Player	To	Type	Fee	Ref
1 July 2022	(Spain) José Manuel Copete	Mallorca	Transfer	Free	
1 September 2022	(Spain) Juan Hernández	Burgos	Transfer	Free	

== Pre-season and friendlies ==
Win Draw Loss Fixtures

16 July 2022 Friendly	Lugo	0–2	Ponferradina
CEST (UTC+2)

24 July 2022 Friendly	Racing Ferrol	1–2	Ponferradina
CEST (UTC+2)

28 July 2022 Friendly	Ponferradina	1–2	Valladolid
CEST (UTC+2)

30 July 2022 Friendly	Sporting Gijón	1–1	Ponferradina
CEST (UTC+2)

3 August 2022 Friendly	Deportivo La Coruña	7–1	Ponferradina
CEST (UTC+2)

14 December 2022 Friendly	Ponferradina	v	Atlético Madrid
18:00 CET (UTC+1)

== Competitions ==
=== Overall record ===
Competition	First match	Last match	Starting round	Final position	Record							
Competition	First match	Last match	Starting round	Final position	Pld	W	D	L	GF	GA	GD	Win %
Segunda División	12 August 2022		Matchday 1		18	4	5	9	18	27	−9	22.22
Copa del Rey	12 November 2022		First round	First round	1	0	0	1	1	2	−1	0.00
Total					19	4	5	10	19	29	−10	21.05

Last updated: 5 December 2022
Source: Soccerway

=== Segunda División ===
==== League table ====
Pos	Team	Pld	W	D	L	GF	GA	GD	Pts	Qualification or relegation
17	Sporting Gijón	42	11	17	14	43	48	−5	50 (Note: Overall goal difference: Sporting Gijón −5, Villarreal B −6.)	
18	Villarreal B	42	13	11	18	49	55	−6	50	Not eligible for promotion
19	Ponferradina (R)	42	9	17	16	40	53	−13	44 (Note: Ponferradina finished ahead of Málaga on head-to-head goal difference: Málaga 1–0 Ponferradina, Ponferradina 2–0 Málaga.)	Relegation to Primera Federación
20	Málaga (R)	42	10	14	18	37	44	−7	44	Relegation to Primera Federación
21	Ibiza (R)	42	7	13	22	33	66	−33	34	Relegation to Primera Federación

Source: LaLiga SmartBank
Rules for classification: 1) points; 2) head-to-head points; 3) head-to-head goal difference; 4) goal difference; 5) number of goals scored
(R) Relegated
Notes:

Notes

1. Reserve teams are not eligible for promotion to the same league as the first team.

==== Results summary ====
Overall								Home						Away					
Pld	W	D	L	GF	GA	GD	Pts	W	D	L	GF	GA	GD	W	D	L	GF	GA	GD
0	0	0	0	0	0	0	0	0	0	0	0	0	0	0	0	0	0	0	0

Last updated: November 2022.
Source: LaLiga SmartBank

==== Results by round ====
Round	1
Ground	
Result	
Position	

Updated to match(es) played on November 2022. Source: LaLiga SmartBank
A = Away; H = Home; W = Win; D = Draw; L = Loss

==== Matches ====
The league fixtures were announced on 23 June 2022.

15 August 2022 1	Cartagena	2–3	Ponferradina	Cartagena
22:00 CEST (UTC+2)				Stadium: Estadio Cartagonova

22 August 2022 2	Ponferradina	2–1	Ibiza	Ponferrada
20:00 CEST (UTC+2)				Stadium: El Toralín

28 August 2022 3	Eibar	1–0	Ponferradina	Eibar
19:30 CEST (UTC+2)

3 September 2022 4	Ponferradina	1–3	Sporting Gijón	Ponferrada
18:30 CEST (UTC+2)				Stadium: El Toralín

11 September 2022 5	Ponferradina	1–2	Zaragoza	Ponferrada
18:30 CEST (UTC+2)				Stadium: El Toralín

18 September 2022 6	Albacete	0–1	Ponferradina	Albacete
21:00 CEST (UTC+2)

24 September 2022 7	Ponferradina	2–2	Tenerife	Ponferrada
18:30 CEST (UTC+2)				Stadium: El Toralín

2 October 2022 8	Alavés	3–1	Ponferradina	Vitoria-Gasteiz
16:15 CEST (UTC+2)

8 October 2022 9	Ponferradina	0–0	Granada	Ponferrada
				Stadium: El Toralín

12 October 2022 10	Villarreal B	2–2	Ponferradina	Villarreal
14:00				Stadium: Ciudad Deportiva Villarreal CF

15 October 2022 11	Ponferradina	0–1	Las Palmas	Ponferrada
				Stadium: El Toralín

23 October 2022 12	Racing Santander	1–1	Ponferradina	Santander

29 October 2022 13	Andorra	3–0	Ponferradina	Andorra la Vella
14:00				Stadium: Estadi Nacional

1 November 2022 14	Ponferradina	1–0	Huesca	Ponferrada
				Stadium: El Toralín

5 November 2022 15	Leganés	2–1	Ponferradina	Leganés

19 November 2022 16	Ponferradina	1–1	Oviedo	Ponferrada
				Stadium: El Toralín

26 November 2022 17	Málaga	1–0	Ponferradina	Málaga

5 December 2022 18	Ponferradina	1–2	Burgos	Ponferrada
				Stadium: El Toralín

8 December 2022 19	Levante	0–0	Ponferradina	Valencia

11 December 2022 20	Ponferradina	1–0	Lugo	Ponferrada
				Stadium: El Toralín

17 December 2022 21	Mirandés	2–1	Ponferradina	Miranda de Ebro

6 January 2023 22	Ponferradina	2–1	Villarreal B	Ponferrada
				Stadium: El Toralín

14 January 2023 23	Tenerife	0–0	Ponferradina	Santa Cruz de Tenerife

21 January 2023 24	Ponferradina	0–1	Eibar	Ponferrada
				Stadium: El Toralín

30 January 2023 25	Zaragoza	0–0	Ponferradina	Zaragoza

5 February 2023 26	Ponferradina	1–1	Racing Santander	Ponferrada
				Stadium: El Toralín

12 February 2023 27	Ibiza	1–1	Ponferradina	Ibiza

18 February 2023 28	Ponferradina	0–0	Levante	Ponferrada
				Stadium: El Toralín

26 February 2023 29	Las Palmas	2–0	Ponferradina	Las Palmas

5 March 2023 30	Ponferradina	0–3	Cartagena	Ponferrada
				Stadium: El Toralín

12 March 2023 31	Granada	2–2	Ponferradina	Granada

18 March 2023 32	Ponferradina	1–0	Alavés	Ponferrada
				Stadium: El Toralín

26 March 2023 33	Ponferradina	0–0	Mirandés	Ponferrada
				Stadium: El Toralín

2 April 2023 34	Lugo	0–0	Ponferradina	Lugo

9 April 2023 35	Ponferradina	0–1	Leganés	Ponferrada
				Stadium: El Toralín

15 April 2023 36	Burgos	2–2	Ponferradina	Burgos

22 April 2023 37	Ponferradina	1–4	Andorra	Ponferrada
				Stadium: El Toralín

30 April 2023 38	Oviedo	3–2	Ponferradina	Oviedo

7 May 2023 39	Ponferradina	2–0	Málaga	Ponferrada
				Stadium: El Toralín

14 May 2023 40	Huesca	1–1	Ponferradina	Huesca

20 May 2023 41	Ponferradina	1–1	Albacete	Ponferrada
				Stadium: El Toralín

28 May 2023 42	Sporting Gijón	1–4	Ponferradina	Gijón
