= Derik Lacerda =

Brazilian footballer (born 1999)

Derik
Personal information
- Full name: Derik Gean Severino Lacerda
- Date of birth: 27 September 1999 (age 27)
- Place of birth: Rio de Janeiro, Brazil
- Height: 1.91 m (6 ft 3 in)
- Position: Forward

Team information
- Current team: Kawasaki Frontale
- Number: 97

Youth career
- EC Resende

Senior career*
Years	Team	Apps	(Gls)
2018–2019	EC Resende		
2019–2020	Académica	14	(2)
2020–2022	Moreirense	41	(2)
2022–2024	Ponferradina	38	(3)
2023	→ Cuiabá (loan)	19	(1)
2024–2026	Cuiabá	63	(12)
2025	→ Sport Recife (loan)	17	(6)
2026	→ Baltika Kaliningrad (loan)	7	(2)
2026–	Kawasaki Frontale	1	(1)
- * Club domestic league appearances and goals as of 30 August 2026

Derik Gean Severino Lacerda (born 27 September 1999), known as Derik, is a Brazilian professional footballer who plays as a forward for Kawasaki Frontale.

== Club career ==
After beginning his career with Esporte Clube Resende, Derik moved to Portuguese club Académica de Coimbra in 2019. On 8 August 2020, he signed for Primeira Liga side Moreirense.

On 31 July 2022, Derik moved to Spanish Segunda División club SD Ponferradina. On 26 July of the following year, after the club's relegation, he returned to his home country after agreeing to a loan deal with Cuiabá until December.

On 18 January 2024, Derik joined Cuiabá on a permanent deal, signing a four-year contract, for a reported transfer fee of R$6.3 million (around €1.2 million).

On 18 February 2026, Derik moved to Russian club Baltika Kaliningrad on loan with an option to buy. He left Baltika after his loan expired.

== Career statistics ==
=== Club ===
As of match played 17 May 2026

Appearances and goals by club, season and competition
Club	Season	League			National cup		Continental		Other		Total	
Club	Season	Division	Apps	Goals	Apps	Goals	Apps	Goals	Apps	Goals	Apps	Goals
Académica	2019–20	LigaPro	14	2	3	0	—		—		17	2
Moreirense	2020–21	Primeira Liga	13	0	2	0	—		—		15	0
Moreirense	2021–22	Primeira Liga	28	2	2	0	—		2 (Note: Appearances in Primeira Liga relegation play-offs)	0	32	2
Moreirense	Total		41	2	4	0	0	0	2	0	47	2
Ponferradina	2022–23	Segunda División	38	3	1	0	—		—		39	3
Cuiabá (loan)	2023	Série A	19	1	0	0	—		0	0	19	1
Cuiabá	2024	Série A	27	4	3	2	7 (Note: Appearances in Copa Sudamericana)	0	13 (Note: Eleven appearances in Campeonato Mato-Grossense, two appearances in Copa Verde)	0	50	6
Cuiabá	2025	Série B	15	2	1	0	—		10 (Note: Appearances in Campeonato Mato-Grossense)	6	26	8
Cuiabá	Total		42	6	4	2	7	0	23	6	76	14
Sport Recife (loan)	2025	Série A	17	6	0	0	—		—		17	6
Baltika Kaliningrad (loan)	2025–26	Russian Premier League	7	2	0	0	—		—		7	2
Career total			178	22	12	2	7	0	25	6	222	30
