= Lucas Rodrigues (footballer, born 1999) =

Brazilian footballer (born 1999)

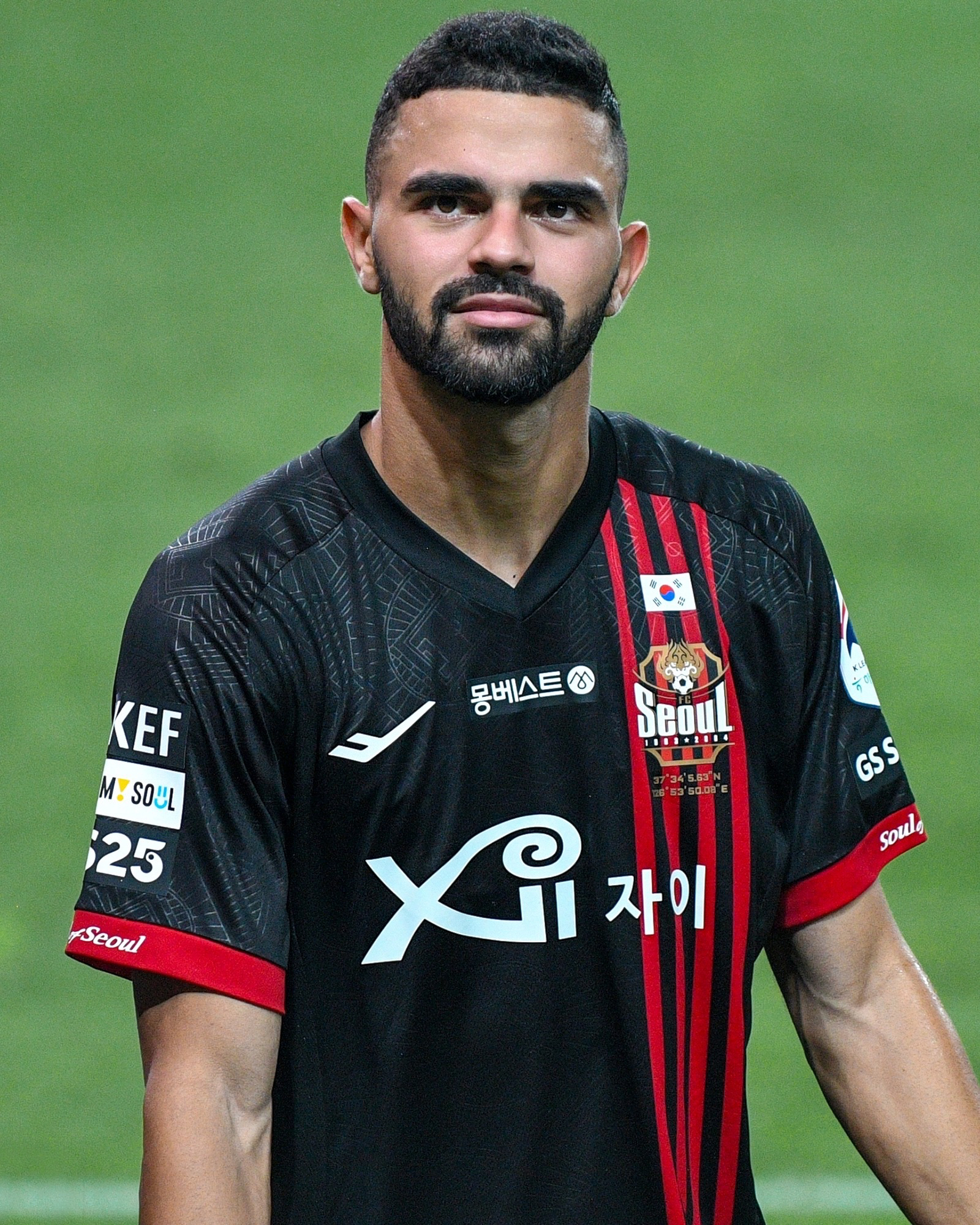
- Rodrigues in 2024

Personal information
- Full name: Lucas Rodrigues da Silva
- Date of birth: 27 August 1999 (age 27)
- Place of birth: São Paulo, Brazil
- Height: 1.84 m (6 ft 0 in)
- Position: Winger

Team information
- Current team: Vitória (on loan from FC Seoul)
- Number: 20

Youth career
- São Paulo
- Mirassol

Senior career*
Years	Team	Apps	(Gls)
2017–2018	Mirassol	10	(0)
2018–2021	Moreirense	18	(0)
2019–2020	→ Mafra (loan)	18	(4)
2021–2023	Casa Pia	7	(0)
2022–2023	→ Mafra (loan)	32	(4)
2023–2024	Marítimo	33	(12)
2024–	FC Seoul	43	(7)
2026–	→ Vitória (loan)	11	(0)
- * Club domestic league appearances and goals as of 15:06, 25 October 2026 (UTC)

Lucas Rodrigues da Silva (born 27 August 1999) is a Brazilian professional footballer who plays as a winger for Vitória, on loan from K League 1 club FC Seoul.

== Career ==
On 22 August 2018, Rodrigues signed his first professional contract with Moreirense. Rodrigues made his professional debut with Moreirense in a 2-0 Primeira Liga win over Portimonense S.C. on 29 March 2019.

On 30 August 2019 he joined Mafra on loan.

On 16 July 2021, he moved to Casa Pia.

On 24 July 2024, he joined FC Seoul.

== Career statistics ==
As of 6 December 2024

Appearances and goals by club, season and competition
Club	Season	League			State league (Note: Includes Campeonato Paulista)		National cup (Note: Includes Taça de Portugal, Copa Paulista)		League cup (Note: Includes Taça da Liga)		Total	
Club	Season	Division	Apps	Goals	Apps	Goals	Apps	Goals	Apps	Goals	Apps	Goals
Mirassol	2017	—	—		1	0	17	1	—		18	1
Mirassol	2018	Serie D	5	0	4	0	2	1	—		11	1
Mirassol	Total		5	0	5	0	19	2	0	0	29	2
Moreirense	2018–19	Primeria Liga	4	0	—		0	0	0	0	4	0
Moreirense	2019–20	Primeria Liga	0	0	—		0	0	1	0	1	0
Moreirense	2020–21	Primeria Liga	14	0	—		0	0	0	0	14	0
Moreirense	Total		18	0	0	0	0	0	1	0	19	0
Mafra (loan)	2019–20	Segunda Liga	18	4	—		2	0	0	0	20	4
Casa Pia	2021–22	Segunda Liga	7	0	—		0	0	0	0	7	0
Mafra (loan)	2022–23	Segunda Liga	32	4	—		2	1	2	0	36	5
Marítimo	2023–24	Segunda Liga	33	12	—		3	0	1	0	37	12
FC Seoul	2024	K League 1	12	2	—		0	0	—		12	2
Career total			125	22	5	0	26	3	4	0	160	25

== Honours ==
Individual

- Liga Portugal 2 Goal of the Month: October/November 2023
