= 2020 Israel State Cup final =

- Event: 2019–20 Israel State Cup
Hapoel Be'er Sheva	Maccabi Petah Tikva
2	0
- Date: 13 July 2020
- Venue: Bloomfield Stadium, Tel Aviv
- Referee: Orel Grinfeld
- Attendance: 0

The 2020 Israel State Cup final decided the winner of the 2019–20 Israel State Cup, the 84th season of Israel's main football cup. It was played on 13 July 2020 at the Bloomfield Stadium in Tel Aviv, between Maccabi Petah Tikva and Hapoel Be'er Sheva.

== Background ==
Maccabi Petah Tikva had previously played 4 Israel cup Finals, had won the competition a record 2 time. Their most recent appearance in the final was in 2001, in which they lost 3–0 to Maccabi Tel Aviv, and their most recent victory in the tournament was in 1952, beating Maccabi Tel Aviv 1–0.

Hapoel Be'er Sheva had previously played in 4 finals, winning one time. Their most recent appearance in the final was in 2015, in which they lost 6–2 to Maccabi Tel Aviv, and their most recent victory in the tournament was in 1997, beating Maccabi Tel Aviv 1–0.

== Road to the final ==
Hapoel Be'er Sheva		Round	Maccabi Petah Tikva
Opponent	Result	2019–20 Israel State Cup	Opponent	Result
		Seventh Round	Hapoel Ramat Gan	2–0
F.C. Ashdod	4–3	Eighth round	Ironi Kiryat Shmona	3–2
Maccabi Netanya	2–0	Round of 16	Hapoel Nazareth Illit	2–1
Maccabi Haifa	2–1	Quarter-finals	Beitar Jerusalem	1–1 (5–3 p.)
Hapoel Tel Aviv	1–2	Semi-finals	Bnei Yehuda	1–1 (6–5 p.)

== Match ==
=== Details ===
13 July 2020
20:45 CEST

Hapoel Be'er Sheva	2–0	Maccabi Petah Tikva
Sahar 49'; Josué 61'	Report

Bloomfield Stadium, Tel Aviv
Attendance: 0
Referee: Orel Grinfeld

GK	21	(Israel) Ohad Levita
RB	2	(Israel) Ben Bitton	(yellow card) 81'
CB	20	(Israel) Loai Taha
CB	4	(Portugal) Miguel Vitor (c)
LB	13	(Israel) Sean Goldberg
CM	29	(Portugal) David Simão	(yellow card) 76'
LM	8	(Israel) Marwan Kabha		(substituted off) 90+1'
RW	27	(Portugal) Josué		(substituted off) 90+1'
CF	15	(Israel) Tomer Yosefi		(substituted off) 67'
LF	22	(Netherlands) Elton Acolatse		(substituted off) 90+1'
LF	14	(Israel) Ben Sahar	(yellow card) 51'	(substituted off) 82'
Substitutes:
GK	1	(Lithuania) Ernestas Šetkus
DF	30	(Israel) Or Dadia		(substituted on) 67'
DF	5	(Israel) Shir Tzedek		(substituted on) 90+1'
DF	16	(Israel) Oren Biton		(substituted on) 90+1'
MF	55	(Israel) Naor Sabag		(substituted on) 90+1'
MF	19	(Israel) Netanel Askias
FW	17	(Israel) Ilay Madmon
FW	9	(Israel) Gaëtan Varenne
FW	12	(Israel) Kayes Ganem		(substituted on) 82'
Manager:
(Israel) Yossi Abuksis

GK	84	(Israel) Dor Hevron
RB	14	(Israel) Dudu Twito
CB	21	(Israel) Daniel Flesher
CB	5	(Israel) Or Blorian
LB	77	(Israel) Tomer Levy		(substituted off) 73'
DM	6	(Israel) Muhammad Sarsour		(substituted off) 53'
CM	23	(Israel) Guy Hadida (c)		(substituted off) 63'
CM	11	(Israel) Arad Bar	(yellow card) 83'
RW	99	(Israel) Lior Inbrum		(substituted off) 73'
CF	20	(Israel) Dor Hugi
LF	19	(Israel) Liel Abada		(substituted off) 73'
Substitutes:
GK	1	(Israel) Yossi Ginzburg
DF	12	(Israel) Idan Adheneny
DF	22	(Israel) Sa'ar Kalderon
DF	3	(Israel) Omer Danino	(yellow card) 76'	(substituted on) 73'
MF	7	(Israel) Ali Babayev
MF	26	(Israel) Eitan Azulay	(yellow card) 71'	(substituted on) 63'
MF	18	(Israel) Ido Davidov		(substituted on) 73'
FW	9	(Israel) Tai Baribo		(substituted on) 73'
FW	10	(Israel) Lidor Cohen		(substituted on) 53'
Manager:
(Israel) Guy Luzon
