= SJPF Young Player of the Month =

Football award

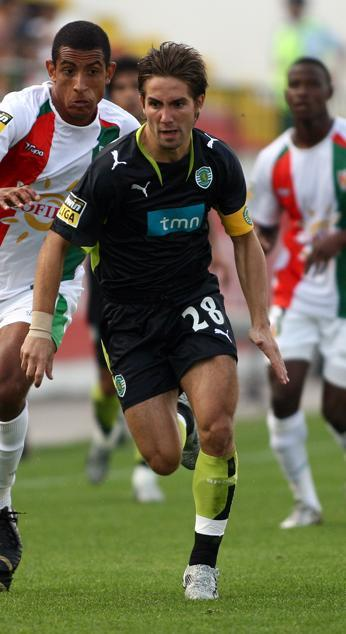
João Moutinho won the award a record of six times.

The SJPF Young Player of the Month (often called Portuguese League Young Player of the Month) is an association football award that recognizes the best Portuguese League young player each month of the season and is conceived by the SJPF (syndicate of professional football players). The award has been presented since the 2003–04 season and the recipient is based on individual scores assigned by the three national sports dailies (A Bola, Record and O Jogo). The first winner of the award was João Moutinho in October 2006. Moutinho has won the award a record six times. Only Portuguese players under age 23 are in contention to win the award.

Prior to the 2012–13 Primeira Liga season, the SJPF announced that the SJPF Primeira Liga Young Player of the Month award would be awarded to a player on a bimonthly status with one player receiving an award for two months of football that have been played. The awards would be awarded during the following periods:

- August and September (Awarded to the Player of the Month in relation to football being played between Gameweek 1 to Gameweek 5)
- October and November (Awarded to the Player of the Month in relation to football being played between Gameweek 6 to Gameweek 10)
- December and January (Awarded to the Player of the Month in relation to football being played between Gameweek 11 to Gameweek 16)
- February (Awarded to the Player of the Month in relation to football being played between Gameweek 17 to Gameweek 20)
- March (Awarded to the Player of the Month in relation to football being played between Gameweek 21 to Gameweek 24)
- April (Awarded to the Player of the Month in relation to football being played between Gameweek 25 to Gameweek 27)

== Winners ==
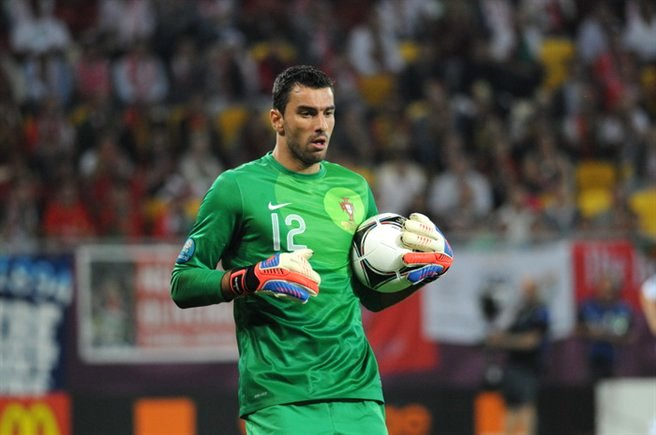
Rui Patrício won the award five times.

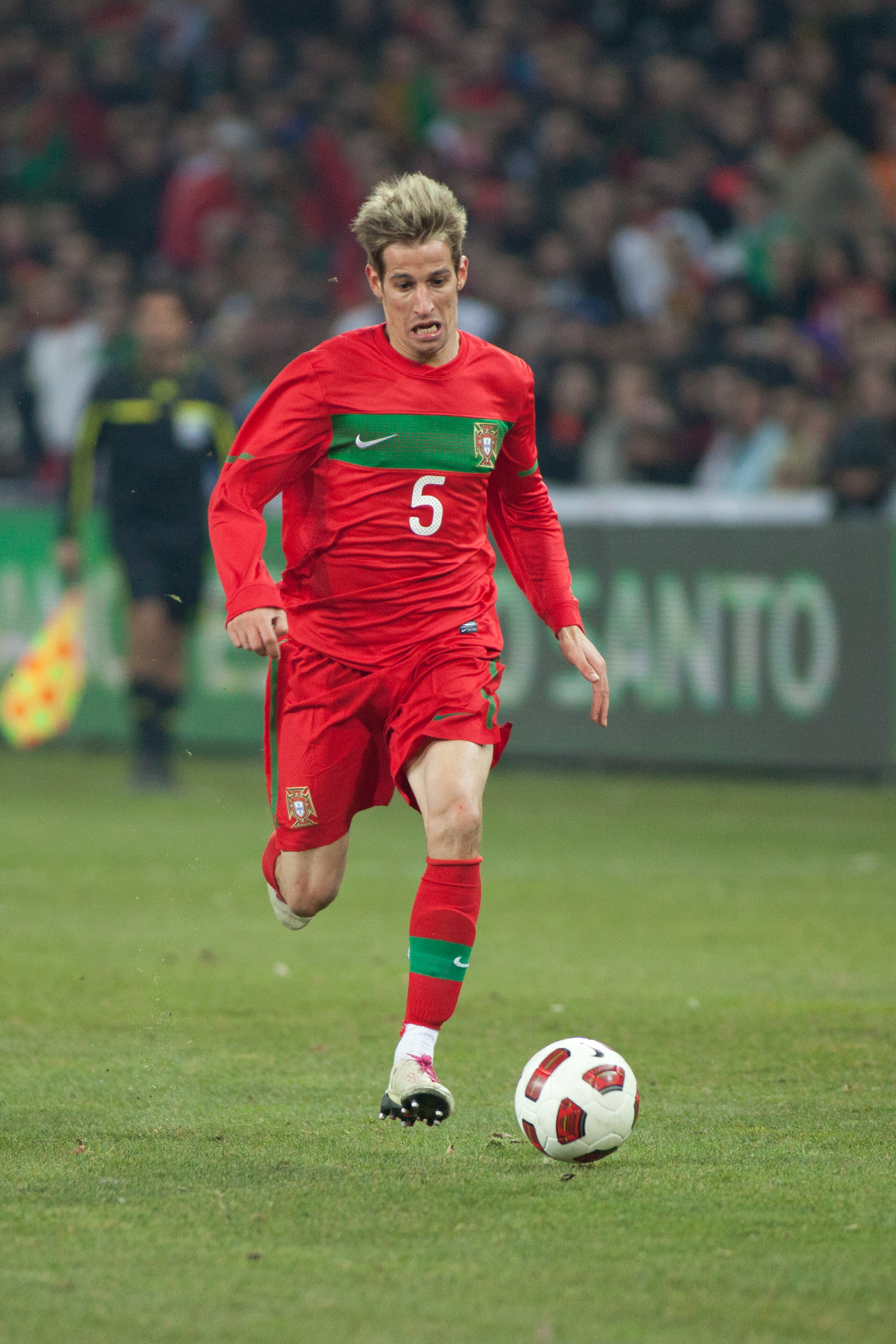
Fábio Coentrão won the award four times.

Key

| GK | Goalkeeper |
| DF | Defender |
| MF | Midfielder |
| FW | Forward |

| Month | Year (Note: Each year is linked to an article on the particular season associated with the month of that year.) | Player | Team | Position | Ref |
|---|---|---|---|---|---|
| October | 2006 | João Moutinho | Sporting CP | MF | |
| November | 2006 | João Moutinho | Sporting CP | MF | |
| December | 2006 | Ruben Amorim | Belenenses | MF | |
| January | 2007 | Silvestre Varela | Vitória de Setúbal | FW | |
| February | 2007 | Silvestre Varela | Vitória de Setúbal | FW | |
| March | 2007 | Yannick Djaló | Sporting CP | FW | |
| April | 2007 | Miguel Veloso | Sporting CP | MF | |
| May | 2007 | Nani | Sporting CP | MF | |
| September | 2007 | Paulo Machado | Leixões | MF | |
| October | 2007 | João Moutinho | Sporting CP | MF | |
| November | 2007 | João Moutinho | Sporting CP | MF | |
| December | 2007 | Tiago Gomes | Estrela da Amadora | DF | |
| January | 2008 | Rui Patrício | Sporting CP | GK | |
| February | 2008 | João Moutinho | Sporting CP | MF | |
| March | 2008 | João Moutinho | Sporting CP | MF | |
| April | 2008 | Paulo Machado | Leixões | MF | |
| September | 2008 | Miguel Vítor | Benfica | DF | |
| October | 2008 | Miguel Lopes | Rio Ave | DF | |
| November | 2008 | Miguel Lopes | Rio Ave | DF | |
| December | 2008 | Celestino | Estrela da Amadora | MF | |
| January | 2009 | Bruno Gama | Vitória de Setúbal | FW | |
| February | 2009 | Yazalde | Rio Ave | FW | |
| March | 2009 | Daniel Carriço | Sporting CP | DF | |
| April | 2009 | Rui Patrício | Sporting CP | GK | |
| May | 2009 | Bruno Gama | Vitória de Setúbal | FW | |
| September | 2009 | André Castro | Olhanense | MF | |
| October | 2009 | Fábio Coentrão | Benfica | DF | |
| November | 2009 | Fábio Faria | Rio Ave | DF | |
| December | 2009 | Fábio Faria | Rio Ave | DF | |
| January | 2010 | André Castro | Olhanense | MF | |
| February | 2010 | André Castro | Olhanense | MF | |
| March | 2010 | Fábio Coentrão | Benfica | DF | |
| April | 2010 | Fábio Coentrão | Benfica | DF | |
| September | 2010 | Fábio Coentrão | Benfica | DF | |
| October | 2010 | Daniel Candeias | Portimonense | FW | |
| November | 2010 | Rui Patrício | Sporting CP | GK | |
| December | 2010 | André Santos | Sporting CP | MF | |
| January | 2011 | Pizzi | Paços de Ferreira | MF | |
| February | 2011 | Rui Sampaio | Beira-Mar | MF | |
| March | 2011 | Rui Patrício | Sporting CP | GK | |
| April | 2011 | Rui Patrício | Sporting CP | GK | |
| September | 2011 | Wilson Eduardo | Olhanense | FW | |
| October | 2011 | Vítor Gomes | Rio Ave | MF | |
| November | 2011 | André Pinto | Olhanense | DF | |
| December | 2011 | Adrien Silva | Académica de Coimbra | MF | |
| January | 2012 | Daniel Candeias | Nacional | FW | |
| February | 2012 | Daniel Candeias | Nacional | FW | |
| March | 2012 | Salvador Agra | Olhanense | FW | |
| April | 2012 | Daniel Candeias | Nacional | FW | |
| August | 2012 | Miguel Lourenço | Vitória de Setúbal | DF | |
| September | 2012 | Miguel Lourenço | Vitória de Setúbal | DF | |
| October | 2012 | Flávio Ferreira | Académica de Coimbra | MF | |
| November | 2012 | Flávio Ferreira | Académica de Coimbra | MF | |
| December | 2012 | David Simão | Marítimo | MF | |
| January | 2013 | David Simão | Marítimo | MF | |
| February | 2013 | Josué | Paços de Ferreira | MF | |
| March | 2013 | Tiago Ilori | Sporting CP | DF | |
| April | 2013 | Amido Baldé | Vitória de Guimarães | FW | |
| August | 2013 | William Carvalho | Sporting CP | MF | |
| September | 2013 | William Carvalho | Sporting CP | MF | |
| October | 2013 | William Carvalho | Sporting CP | MF | |
| November | 2013 | William Carvalho | Sporting CP | MF | |
| December | 2013 | Paulo Oliveira | Vitória de Guimarães | DF | |
| January | 2014 | João Mário | Vitória de Setúbal | MF | |
| February | 2014 | João Mário | Vitória de Setúbal | MF | |
| March | 2014 | William Carvalho | Sporting CP | MF | |
| April | 2014 | William Carvalho | Sporting CP | MF | |
| August/September | 2016 | Gelson Martins | Sporting CP | | |
| October/November | 2016 | Gonçalo Guedes | Benfica | | |
| December | 2016 | Gelson Martins | Sporting CP | | |
| January | 2017 | André Silva | Porto | | |
| February | 2017 | Nélson Semedo | Benfica | | |
| March | 2017 | João Carvalho | Vitória de Setúbal | | |
| April | 2017 | João Carvalho | Vitória de Setúbal | | |

== Statistics ==
=== Awards won by club ===
| Club | Wins |
|---|---|
| Sporting CP | 24 |
| Vitória de Setúbal | 8 |
| Olhanense | 6 |
| Rio Ave | 6 |
| Benfica | 5 |
| Académica de Coimbra | 3 |
| Nacional | 3 |
| Estrela da Amadora | 2 |
| Leixões | 2 |
| Marítimo | 2 |
| Paços de Ferreira | 2 |
| Vitória de Guimarães | 2 |
| Beira-Mar | 1 |
| Belenenses | 1 |
| Portimonense | 1 |

=== Multiple winners ===
| Rank | Player | Wins |
|---|---|---|
| 1st | William Carvalho | 6 |
| 1st | João Moutinho | 6 |
| 2nd | Rui Patrício | 5 |
| 3rd | Daniel Candeias | 4 |
| 3rd | Fábio Coentrão | 4 |
| 5th | André Castro | 3 |
| 6th | Bruno Gama | 2 |
| 6th | David Simão | 2 |
| 6th | Fábio Faria | 2 |
| 6th | Flávio Ferreira | 2 |
| 6th | Miguel Lopes | 2 |
| 6th | Miguel Lourenço | 2 |
| 6th | Paulo Machado | 2 |
| 6th | Silvestre Varela | 2 |
| 6th | João Mário | 2 |

=== Awards won by position ===
| Position | Wins |
|---|---|
| Midfielder | 32 |
| Defender | 16 |
| Forward | 13 |
| Goalkeeper | 5 |
