= Miguel Vítor =

Portuguese-Israeli association footballer

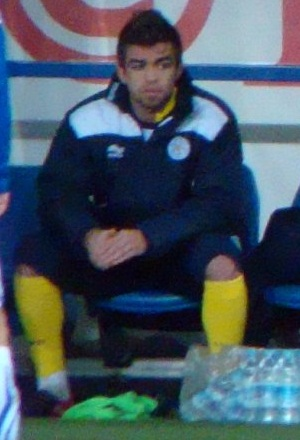
- Vítor with Leicester City in 2011

Personal information
- Full name: Miguel Ângelo Leonardo Vítor
- Date of birth: 30 June 1989 (age 37)
- Place of birth: Torres Vedras, Portugal
- Height: 1.84 m (6 ft 0 in)
- Position: Centre-back

Team information
- Current team: Hapoel Be'er Sheva
- Number: 4

Youth career
- 1997–2000: Torreense
- 2000–2007: Benfica

Senior career*
Years	Team	Apps	(Gls)
2007–2013	Benfica	24	(0)
2008	→ Aves (loan)	7	(0)
2010–2011	→ Leicester City (loan)	15	(3)
2012–2013	Benfica B	11	(3)
2013–2016	PAOK	83	(8)
2016–	Hapoel Be'er Sheva	229	(21)

International career
2006–2007	Portugal U18	8	(3)
2007–2008	Portugal U19	9	(4)
2008–2010	Portugal U21	15	(1)
2011	Portugal U23	1	(0)
2022–2024	Israel	12	(0)
- * Club domestic league appearances and goals as of 16:12, 17 November 2026 (UTC)

Miguel Ângelo Leonardo Vítor (Portuguese pronunciation: [miˈɣɛɫ ˈɐ̃ʒɨlu liuˈnaɾðu ˈvitoɾ]; Hebrew: מיגל אנז'לו לאונרדו ויטור; born 30 June 1989) is a professional footballer who plays as a centre-back for Israeli Premier League club Hapoel Be'er Sheva, where he is also captain.

He spent most of his career with Benfica (mostly as backup), PAOK and Hapoel Be'er Sheva. At the latter club, he made more than 275 competitive appearances and won several honours, including the 2016–17, 2017–18 and 2025–26 editions of the Israeli Premier League.

Born in Portugal, Vítor represented Portugal at youth level before switching his allegiance to Israel in 2022.

== Club career ==
=== Benfica ===
Vítor was born in Torres Vedras, Lisbon District. Having been promoted from S.L. Benfica's junior squad for the 2007–08 season, he made his debut for the first team in August 2007, appearing in both the Primeira Liga, against Vitória de Guimarães, and the UEFA Champions League, facing F.C. Copenhagen in the third qualifying round; this was because habitual starters Luisão and David Luiz were sidelined with injuries.

Like Romeu Ribeiro, Vítor was loaned to Liga de Honra side C.D. Aves in January 2008 until the end of the season. Subsequently, he returned to Benfica, being relatively used in his first full campaign.

In early July 2010, Vítor joined English Championship club Leicester City in a season-long loan, teaming up with compatriots Moreno and manager Paulo Sousa. He made his debut on 21 September in a 2–1 win over Portsmouth in the third round of the League Cup at Fratton Park. On 6 November he scored his first professional goal, heading from a Martyn Waghorn free kick after 18 minutes in an eventual 2–0 victory against Barnsley at Oakwell.

On 19 December 2010, Vítor suffered a pulled hamstring in a 3–0 away defeat to Ipswich Town, being sidelined for three months. He netted twice on his return, a 3–0 win at Scunthorpe United on 12 March 2011.

Vítor subsequently returned to Benfica, being completely ostracised by manager Jorge Jesus and even being demoted to the B team. After he refused to renew his contract, he left in late May 2013.

=== PAOK ===
On 24 June 2013, Vítor signed with Super League Greece club PAOK FC. He scored his first goal for his new team – also their first in the new season – on 17 August, netting through a header in a 3–0 home win against Skoda Xanthi FC.

Vítor was first choice during his spell in Thessaloniki, scoring twice in 33 games in the 2014–15 campaign to help his side finish third. On 10 June 2016, it was announced he would be released as his contract would not be renewed.

=== Hapoel Be'er Sheva ===
On 1 July 2016, free agent Vítor agreed to a three-year deal at Israeli Premier League champions Hapoel Be'er Sheva FC, for an undisclosed fee. He won the national championship in his first two seasons, totalling three goals in the process.

Vítor extended his contract in November 2017, to last until 2021. He became captain, and accompanied by compatriots David Simão and Josué Pesqueira, won the State Cup on 13 July 2020 with a 2–0 final victory over Maccabi Petah Tikva FC.

In February 2022, Vítor's link to his club was extended by another year, to June 2023.

== International career ==
=== Portugal ===
Vítor earned 33 caps for Portugal at youth levels, starting with a 2–1 win for the under-18s against Ukraine in Montemor-o-Novo on 30 November 2006; he scored the opening goal. His final appearance was his sole game for the under-23 team on 23 March 2011, a 3–2 victory over an Italian Lega Pro XI in Trapani.

=== Israel ===
In October 2021, Vítor declared his wish to naturalise himself as an Israeli citizen and to play for the national team, a decision supported by Austrian manager Willibald Ruttensteiner. Israel Football Association chairman Oren Hasson sent the player's official application to the government – the Minister of Culture and Sport Hili Tropper recommended it to the Minister of Interior Ayelet Shaked, who granted Vítor's application to become a citizen on 1 May 2022.

Vítor's naturalisation was criticised by some in Israel as motivated only by his footballing ability. His case was contrasted with that of African-American Jewish basketball player Jared Armstrong, who was refused citizenship despite his religion and was only given a temporary residency permit.

Vítor made his debut on 2 June 2022 at the age of 32 years and 11 months, starting in a 2–2 home draw against Iceland in the UEFA Nations League.

== Personal life ==
Vítor resided in Israel since 2016, having moved to the country along with his wife and three daughters.

== Career statistics ==
=== Club ===
As of match played 22 May 2022

Appearances and goals by club, season and competition
Club	Season	League			National cup		League cup		Continental		Other		Total	
Club	Season	Division	Apps	Goals	Apps	Goals	Apps	Goals	Apps	Goals	Apps	Goals	Apps	Goals
Benfica	2007–08	Primeira Liga	2	0	0	0	0	0	2 (Note: Appearances in UEFA Champions League)	0	—		4	0
Benfica	2008–09	Primeira Liga	16	0	1	0	4	0	1 (Note: Appearances in UEFA Cup)	0	—		22	0
Benfica	2009–10	Primeira Liga	2	0	1	0	0	0	3 (Note: Appearances in UEFA Europa League)	0	—		6	0
Benfica	2011–12	Primeira Liga	3	0	1	0	1	0	4	0	—		9	0
Benfica	2012–13	Primeira Liga	1	0	0	0	0	0	0	0	—		1	0
Benfica	Total		24	0	3	0	5	0	10	0	—		42	0
Aves (loan)	2007–08	Segunda Liga	7	0	1	0	0	0	—		—		8	0
Leicester City (loan)	2010–11	Championship	15	3	0	0	2	0	—		—		17	3
PAOK	2013–14	Super League Greece	24	4	4	0	—		8 (Note: Appearances in UEFA Champions League and UEFA Europa League)	1	—		36	5
PAOK	2014–15	Super League Greece	33	2	2	0	—		6	0	—		41	2
PAOK	2015–16	Super League Greece	26	2	4	0	—		8	0	—		38	2
PAOK	Total		83	8	10	0	—		22	1	—		115	9
Hapoel Be'er Sheva	2016–17	Israeli Premier League	20	2	0	0	0	0	10	1	1	0	31	3
Hapoel Be'er Sheva	2017–18	Israeli Premier League	7	1	0	0	1	0	6	1	—		14	2
Hapoel Be'er Sheva	2018–19	Israeli Premier League	9	1	1	0	0	0	0	0	—		10	1
Hapoel Be'er Sheva	2019–20	Israeli Premier League	29	3	4	1	0	0	6	0	—		39	4
Hapoel Be'er Sheva	2020–21	Israeli Premier League	26	0	0	0	1	0	7	1	—		34	1
Hapoel Be'er Sheva	2021–22	Israeli Premier League	33	5	2	1	2	0	6	0	—		39	5
Hapoel Be'er Sheva	Total		124	12	7	2	4	0	35	3	1	0	171	17
Career total			252	23	21	2	11	0	67	4	1	0	352	29

=== International ===
Appearances and goals by national team and year
National team	Year	Apps	Goals
Israel	2022	5	0
Israel	2023	6	0
Israel	2024	1	0
Total		12	0

== Honours ==
Benfica

- Primeira Liga: 2009–10
- Taça da Liga: 2008–09, 2011–12

PAOK

- Greek Football Cup runner-up: 2013–14

Hapoel Be'er Sheva

- Israeli Premier League: 2016–17, 2017–18, 2025–26
- Israel State Cup: 2019–20, 2021–22, 2024–25
- Toto Cup: 2016–17
- Israel Super Cup: 2016, 2017, 2022, 2025

Individual

- Primeira Liga Young Player of the Month: September 2008
- UEFA Europa League Team of the Week: 2016–17
- Israeli Footballer of the Year: 2017

== See also ==
- List of Israelis
