= Josué Pesqueira =

Portuguese footballer (born 1990)

Josué
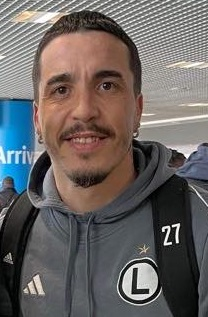
- Josué with Legia Warsaw in 2023

Personal information
- Full name: Josué Filipe Soares Pesqueira
- Date of birth: 17 September 1990 (age 36)
- Place of birth: Valongo, Portugal
- Height: 1.74 m (5 ft 9 in)
- Position: Attacking midfielder

Team information
- Current team: Coritiba
- Number: 10

Youth career
- 1999–2009: Porto
- 2005–2006: → Padroense (loan)
- 2007: → Candal (loan)

Senior career*
Years	Team	Apps	(Gls)
2009–2011	Porto	0	(0)
2009	→ Covilhã (loan)	5	(1)
2010	→ Penafiel (loan)	14	(1)
2010–2011	→ VVV (loan)	13	(0)
2011–2013	Paços Ferreira	42	(0)
2013–2017	Porto	20	(4)
2014–2016	→ Bursaspor (loan)	44	(7)
2016	→ Braga (loan)	12	(2)
2016–2017	→ Galatasaray (loan)	25	(2)
2017–2018	Osmanlıspor	9	(0)
2018–2019	Akhisarspor	20	(2)
2019–2021	Hapoel Be'er Sheva	53	(13)
2021–2024	Legia Warsaw	94	(23)
2024–	Coritiba	93	(10)

International career
2009	Portugal U19	3	(0)
2009	Portugal U20	3	(2)
2010–2012	Portugal U21	17	(3)
2013–2014	Portugal	4	(0)
- * Club domestic league appearances and goals as of 22:32, 12 November 2026 (UTC)

Josué Filipe Soares Pesqueira (born 17 September 1990), known simply as Josué, is a Portuguese professional footballer who plays as an attacking midfielder for Campeonato Brasileiro Série A club Coritiba.

He spent most of his career attached to Porto, though he was often loaned out, and also represented Paços de Ferreira and Braga in the Primeira Liga. Abroad, he played for four clubs in Turkey's Süper Lig, among them Bursaspor and Galatasaray. He also had a three-year spell at Legia Warsaw, where he won the Polish Cup and the Polish Super Cup in 2023, before joining Coritiba the following year.

Josué made his full debut for Portugal in 2013.

== Club career ==
=== Early years and Paços ===
Born in Valongo, Porto District, Josué joined FC Porto's youth system at the age of nine. He spent his first two seasons as a senior on loan, both in Portugal and abroad, representing successively S.C. Covilhã, F.C. Penafiel (both in the Segunda Liga) and VVV-Venlo (Netherlands).

In summer 2011, Josué was released by Porto with only two official appearances to his credit, both in the Taça da Liga, and signed with F.C. Paços de Ferreira. He made his Primeira Liga debut on 17 September, playing the full 90 minutes in a 1–0 away loss against C.D. Nacional. In his second year he contributed 23 league appearances – 18 starts – as the club finished a best-ever third and qualified for the UEFA Champions League, and was chosen as Best Young Player in the competition in the process.

=== Return to Porto ===
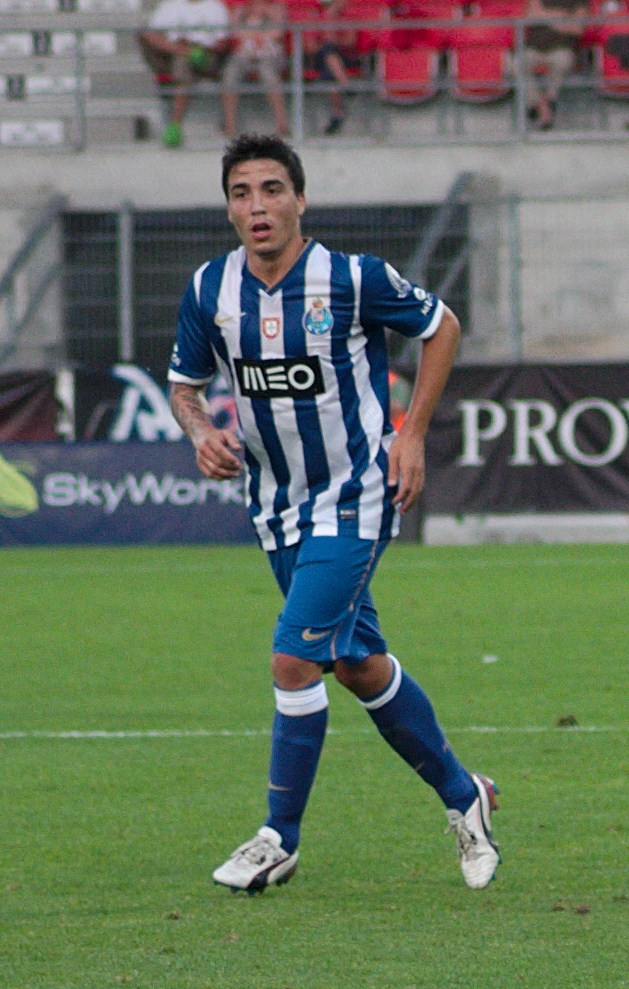
Josué with Porto in 2013

Josué agreed on a return to former side Porto on 29 May 2013, penning a four-year contract and moving alongside manager Paulo Fonseca. On 10 August he won his first club honour, coming on as a substitute in a 3–0 win over Vitória de Guimarães in the Supertaça Cândido de Oliveira, and scored his first goal for his new team a week later starting and netting through a penalty kick in a 3–1 victory at Vitória de Setúbal.

Deemed surplus to requirements at Porto as practically all Portuguese players, Josué then spent 18 months on loan at Bursaspor. He made his Süper Lig debut on 30 August 2014, coming on as a late substitute in a 0–2 home loss to Galatasaray SK, and helped the team to the final of the Turkish Cup, notably contributing a brace to a 3–2 away defeat of Samsunspor in the group phase on 24 December 2014. On 26 January 2016, he returned to his homeland and was loaned to S.C. Braga for the rest of the campaign, netting against his parent club in the decisive match of the Taça de Portugal that was won in a penalty shootout for their first such title in half a century.

On 23 August 2016, Josué returned to Turkey, joining Galatasaray on a season-long loan. He scored his first goal for the Istanbul-based team on 25 December, closing a 5–1 home win against Alanyaspor six minutes after replacing Eren Derdiyok.

=== Osmanlıspor and Akhisarspor ===
Josué left Porto in August 2017, signing a two-year contract at Osmanlıspor again in Turkey's top flight. He was released in December, and resumed his career the following July with a deal of the same length at Akhisarspor. His side finished runners-up in the Turkish Cup to former club Galatasaray, with him scoring in both legs of a 5–2 aggregate victory over Kasımpaşa S.K. in the quarter-finals. In June 2019, however, after being relegated, he severed his ties to the organisation.

=== Hapoel Be'er Sheva ===
In September 2019, Josué signed for Hapoel Be'er Sheva F.C. of the Israeli Premier League for two years, joining compatriot Miguel Vítor. Later joined by David Simão, they won the State Cup in his first season, with him scoring in the semi-finals against Bnei Yehuda Tel Aviv F.C. on 10 June and the 2–0 final win over Maccabi Petah Tikva F.C. on 13 July.

Josué and Vítor cut their salaries in half in May 2020 to stay in Israel for another year. Ten months later, he extended his stay for one more season.

=== Legia Warsaw ===
On 21 June 2021, Josué joined Polish Ekstraklasa champions Legia Warsaw on a two-year contract. He and his compatriot Yuri Ribeiro won the 2022–23 edition of the Polish Cup, defeating Raków Częstochowa 6–5 on penalties.

Josué scored 12 goals in 32 games in 2022–23 as the team from the capital city came runners-up to Raków Częstochowa, adding seven assists and being voted the league's Midfielder of the Season and also nominated for Player of the Season, which went to Kamil Grosicki. On 29 October that year, he scored a hat-trick in a 5–2 win at Jagiellonia Białystok; his performances earned him a one-year extension.

On 5 October 2023, Josué was arrested by Dutch police alongside teammate Radovan Pankov after an altercation with security staff following a match against AZ Alkmaar in the group stage of the UEFA Europa Conference League; they were released the following day without charge. On 14 December, he assisted Blaž Kramer in the reverse fixture for a 2–0 home victory, securing qualification as second. The following day, UEFA charged AZ with a €40,000 fine for failing to provide security for the Polish side at the AZ Stadium.

In May 2024, Josué was again nominated for the Ekstraklasa Midfielder of the Season award. Shortly after, he announced on Instagram that he would leave the Warsaw Stadium on 30 June when his contract expired. During his last appearance for Legia, ultras displayed a banner with the words in Portuguese: “Obrigado, capitão!” (lit. 'Thank you, Captain!'). The fans gathered at the stadium to chant his name, and when he walked off the field in the 90th minute they honoured him with a standing ovation. He assisted both goals in the 2–1 win over Zagłębie Lubin, and later approached the Żyleta stand with his daughter to thank the supporters; his departure was due to the reluctance of the board of directors, most notably sporting director Jacek Zieliński, to hand him a new deal. The decision, announced three weeks before the end of the campaign, was met with resentment from club fans, with manager Gonçalo Feio also distancing himself from it.

=== Coritiba ===
On 14 August 2024, Josué signed with Campeonato Brasileiro Série B club Coritiba Foot Ball Club. He won the national championship in his second season, being voted best player in the process; he was one of his team's top scorers at six goals, also leading the league in chances created according to the Sofascore website.

== International career ==
Josué won 26 caps for Portugal across all youth levels, including 17 for the under-21 team. He made his debut with the full side on 11 October 2013, playing 21 minutes in a 1–1 home draw with Israel for the 2014 FIFA World Cup qualifiers.

In the second leg of the play-offs against Sweden on 19 November, Josué (who was not used in the game) extended his middle finger towards the opposing fans, while celebrating his country's qualification to the World Cup after the final whistle.

== Career statistics ==
=== Club ===
As of 27 May 2024

Appearances and goals by club, season and competition
Club	Season	League			National cup (Note: Includes Taça de Portugal, KNVB Cup, Turkish Cup, Israel State Cup, Polish Cup)		League cup (Note: Includes Taça da Liga)		Continental		Other		Total	
Club	Season	Division	Apps	Goals	Apps	Goals	Apps	Goals	Apps	Goals	Apps	Goals	Apps	Goals
Porto	2008–09	Primeira Liga	0	0	0	0	2	0	0	0	—		2	0
Covilhã (loan)	2009–10	Segunda Liga	5	1	1	1	3	0	—		—		9	2
Penafiel (loan)	2009–10	Segunda Liga	14	1	0	0	0	0	—		—		14	1
VVV (loan)	2010–11	Eredivisie	13	0	1	0	—		—		—		14	0
Paços Ferreira	2011–12	Primeira Liga	19	0	2	0	2	1	—		—		23	1
Paços Ferreira	2012–13	Primeira Liga	23	0	5	1	5	4	—		—		33	5
Paços Ferreira	Total		42	0	7	1	7	5	—		—		56	6
Porto	2013–14	Primeira Liga	20	4	4	0	2	1	8 (Note: Six appearances in UEFA Champions League, two appearances in UEFA Europa League)	0	1 (Note: Appearance in Supertaça Cândido de Oliveira)	0	35	5
Bursaspor (loan)	2014–15	Süper Lig	30	7	9	2	—		—		—		39	9
Bursaspor (loan)	2015–16	Süper Lig	14	0	2	0	—		—		1 (Note: Appearances in Turkish Super Cup)	0	17	0
Bursaspor (loan)	Total		44	7	11	2	—		—		1	0	56	9
Braga (loan)	2015–16	Primeira Liga	12	2	3	1	—		5 (Note: Appearances in UEFA Europa League)	2	—		20	5
Galatasaray (loan)	2016–17	Süper Lig	25	2	8	2	—		—		—		33	4
Osmanlispor	2017–18	Süper Lig	9	0	1	0	—		—		—		10	0
Akhisarspor	2018–19	Süper Lig	20	2	4	2	—		5	0	—		29	4
Hapoel Be'er Sheva	2019–20	Israeli Premier League	28	4	4	2	—		—		—		32	6
Hapoel Be'er Sheva	2020–21	Israeli Premier League	25	9	0	0	—		9	4	—		34	13
Hapoel Be'er Sheva	Total		53	13	4	2	—		9	4	—		66	19
Legia Warsaw	2021–22	Ekstraklasa	30	2	4	1	—		10 (Note: Three appearances in UEFA Champions League, seven appearances in UEFA Europa League)	0	—		44	3
Legia Warsaw	2022–23	Ekstraklasa	32	12	5	3	—		—		—		37	15
Legia Warsaw	2023–24	Ekstraklasa	32	9	2	0	—		14 (Note: Appearances in UEFA Europa Conference League)	2	1 (Note: Appearance in Polish Super Cup)	0	49	11
Legia Warsaw	Total		94	23	11	4	—		24	2	1	0	131	28
Career total			342	55	55	15	14	6	51	8	3	0	466	84

=== International ===
Appearances and goals by national team and year
National team	Year	Apps	Goals
Portugal	2013	3	0
Portugal	2014	1	0
Total		4	0

== Honours ==
Porto

- Supertaça Cândido de Oliveira: 2013

Braga

- Taça de Portugal: 2015–16

Akhisarspor

- Turkish Super Cup: 2018

Hapoel Be'er Sheva

- Israel State Cup: 2019–20

Legia Warsaw

- Polish Cup: 2022–23
- Polish Super Cup: 2023

Coritiba

- Campeonato Brasileiro Série B: 2025

Individual

- Primeira Liga Breakthrough Player of the Year: 2012–13
- SJPF Young Player of the Month: February 2013
- Ekstraklasa Midfielder of the Season: 2022–23
- Piłka Nożna Foreigner of the Year: 2023
- Polish Union of Footballers' Ekstraklasa Team of the Season: 2023–24
- Bola de Prata: 2025 Campeonato Brasileiro Série B Best Player
