= Ibrahima Camará (footballer, born 1999) =

Guinean footballer born 1999

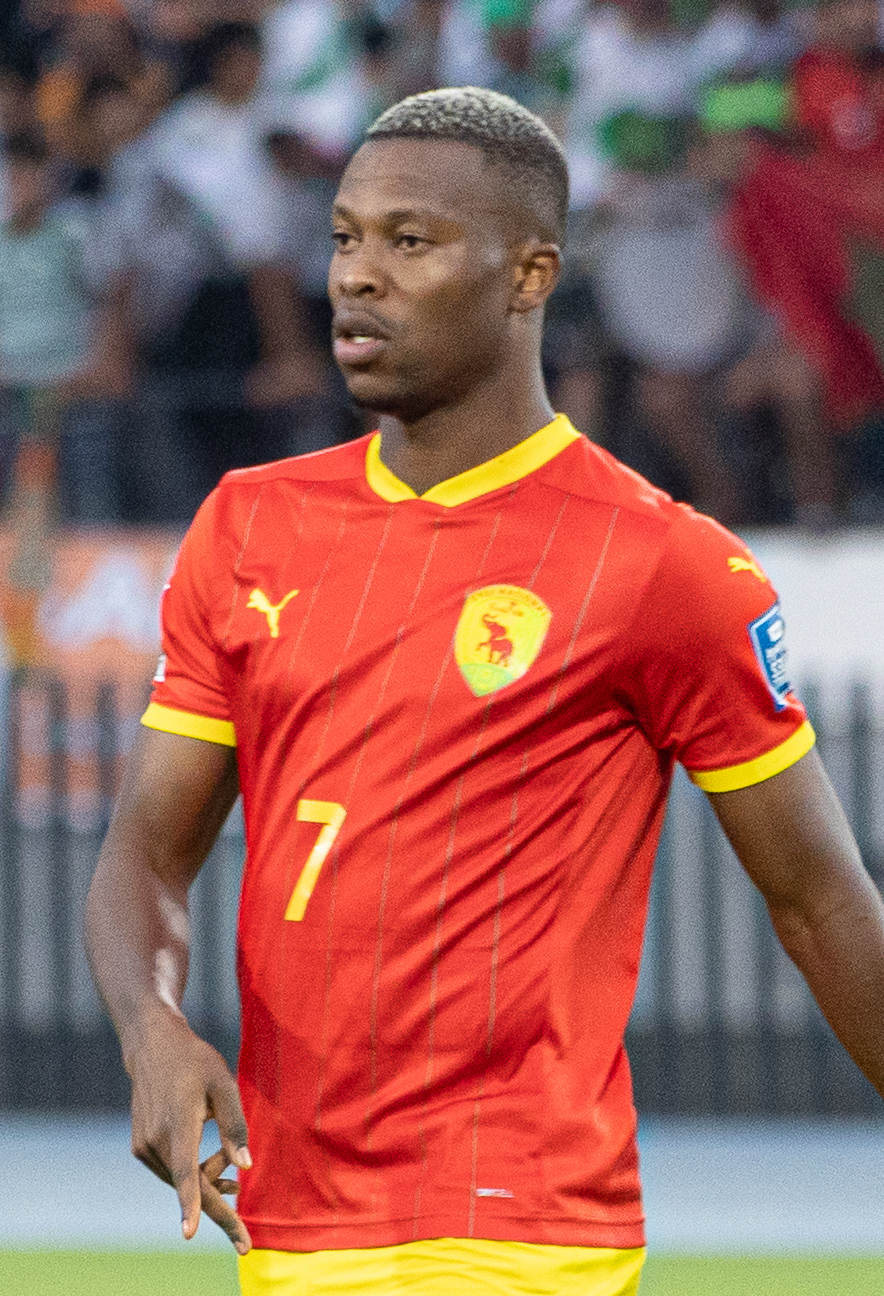
- Camará with Guinea in 2025

Personal information
- Date of birth: 25 January 1999 (age 27)
- Place of birth: Conakry, Guinea
- Height: 1.90 m (6 ft 3 in)
- Position: Defensive midfielder

Team information
- Current team: Radomiak Radom
- Number: 8

Youth career
- Universal Soccer Academy
- 2016–2018: Braga

Senior career*
Years	Team	Apps	(Gls)
2018–2019	Braga B	17	(3)
2019–2022	Moreirense	61	(0)
2022–2025	Boavista	65	(0)
2025–	Radomiak Radom	35	(1)

International career^{‡}
2019–	Guinea	8	(1)
- * Club domestic league appearances and goals as of 11:50, 31 October 2026 (UTC) ‡ National team caps and goals as of 18:54, 9 October 2025 (UTC)

Ibrahima Camará (born 25 January 1999) is a Guinean professional footballer who plays as a defensive midfielder for Ekstraklasa club Radomiak Radom and the Guinea national team.

== Club career ==
On 7 July 2018, Camará signed his first professional contract with Braga after two years in their academy. Camará made his professional debut for Braga B in a 1–0 LigaPro loss to G.D. Estoril Praia on 18 August 2018. On 1 February 2019, signed with Moreirense in the Primeira Liga.

On 30 August 2023, Camará signed a four-year contract with Boavista.

On 13 July 2025, Camará joined Polish club Radomiak Radom on a two-year contract, with a one-year option. On 1 December 2025, he was suspended by the club due to "the emergence of information requiring clarification by the competent authorities". He was reinstated by Radomiak and resumed training in January 2026.

On 24 October 2026, during an away match with Pogoń Szczecin, Camará was given a red card in the 89th minute for kicking Alessandro Pio Riccio. Shortly after walking off the pitch, he returned to the sidelines and punched Pogoń's Darko Churlinov. On 28 October, he was given a six-month suspension from all competitions and a PLN 50,000 fine by the Ekstraklasa league committee for "particularly egregious and unsportsmanlike conduct".

== International career ==
Camará debuted for the Guinea national team in a friendly 2–3 loss to Chile on 13 October 2019, and scored his side's second goal in the 80th minute.

== Personal life ==
On 1 December 2025, Camará was arrested and charged with rape, with the alleged offence taking place on 29 November. He pleaded not guilty, and was temporarily released from custody two weeks later.

== Career statistics ==
=== Club ===
As of match played 24 October 2026

Appearances and goals by club, season and competition
Club	Season	League			National cup (Note: Includes Taça de Portugal, Polish Cup)		League cup (Note: Includes Taça da Liga)		Other		Total	
Club	Season	Division	Apps	Goals	Apps	Goals	Apps	Goals	Apps	Goals	Apps	Goals
Braga B	2018–19	LigaPro	17	3	—		—		—		17	3
Moreirense	2018–19	Primeira Liga	7	0	0	0	0	0	—		7	0
Moreirense	2019–20	Primeira Liga	8	0	2	0	0	0	—		10	0
Moreirense	2020–21	Primeira Liga	16	0	1	0	—		—		17	0
Moreirense	2021–22	Primeira Liga	29	0	3	0	0	0	1 (Note: Appearance in Primeira Liga relegation play-offs)	0	33	0
Moreirense	2022–23	Liga Portugal 2	1	0	0	0	0	0	—		1	0
Moreirense	Total		61	0	6	0	0	0	1	0	68	0
Boavista	2022–23	Primeira Liga	24	0	0	0	4	0	—		28	0
Boavista	2023–24	Primeira Liga	15	0	1	0	0	0	—		16	0
Boavista	2024–25	Primeira Liga	26	0	1	0	0	0	—		27	0
Boavista	Total		65	0	2	0	4	0	—		71	0
Radomiak Radom	2025–26	Ekstraklasa	23	0	1	0	—		—		24	0
Radomiak Radom	2026–27	Ekstraklasa	12	1	1	0	—		—		13	1
Radomiak Radom	Total		35	1	2	0	—		—		37	1
Career total			178	4	10	0	4	0	1	0	193	4

=== International ===
As of match played 9 October 2025

Appearances and goals by national team and year
National team	Year	Apps	Goals
Guinea	2019	2	1
Guinea	2020	1	0
Guinea	2021	3	0
Guinea	2025	2	0
Total		8	1

Scores and results list Guinea's goal tally first, score column indicates score after each Camará goal.

List of international goals scored by Ibrahima Camará
No.	Date	Venue	Opponent	Score	Result	Competition
1	15 October 2019	Estadio José Rico Pérez, Alicante, Spain	Chile	2–2	2–3	Friendly

== Honours ==
Moreirense

- Liga Portugal 2: 2022–23
