= David Simão =

Portuguese footballer

Personal information
- Full name: David Martins Simão
- Date of birth: 15 May 1990 (age 36)
- Place of birth: Versailles, France
- Height: 1.83 m (6 ft 0 in)
- Position: Midfielder

Youth career
- 1998–2000: Abóboda
- 2000–2009: Benfica

Senior career*
Years	Team	Apps	(Gls)
2008–2013	Benfica	0	(0)
2009–2010	→ Fátima (loan)	25	(5)
2010–2011	→ Paços Ferreira (loan)	25	(0)
2012	→ Académica (loan)	11	(1)
2012–2013	→ Marítimo (loan)	26	(4)
2013–2016	Arouca	79	(11)
2016–2017	CSKA Sofia	24	(3)
2017–2019	Boavista	40	(2)
2019	Antwerp	12	(0)
2019–2021	AEK Athens	4	(0)
2020	→ Hapoel Be'er Sheva (loan)	10	(0)
2021	→ Moreirense (loan)	16	(0)
2022–2026	Arouca	114	(2)

International career
2006	Portugal U16	8	(1)
2006–2007	Portugal U17	11	(1)
2007–2008	Portugal U18	7	(2)
2008–2009	Portugal U19	8	(1)
2010	Portugal U20	5	(3)
2010–2012	Portugal U21	11	(1)
- * Club domestic league appearances and goals as of 15:29, 19 January 2026 (UTC)

David Martins Simão (born 15 May 1990) is a Portuguese professional footballer who plays as a midfielder.

Over 14 seasons, he achieved Primeira Liga totals of 311 games and 20 goals, including eight over two spells at Arouca. He also played top-flight football in Bulgaria, Belgium, Greece and Israel, winning the 2019–20 Israel State Cup with Hapoel Be'er Sheva.

== Club career ==
Born in Versailles, Yvelines, France, Simão spent most of his youth career at S.L. Benfica, having arrived at the age of 10 from Grupo Instrução Musical Desportiva Abóboda. On 19 January 2008, he was called to the first team for a Taça de Portugal tie against C.D. Feirense, courtesy of manager José Antonio Camacho, and was also picked for both UEFA Cup round-of-16 matches against Getafe CF, not being used however in any of the three fixtures.

Simão made his professional debut with C.D. Fátima, on loan, his first appearance being against C.D. Santa Clara in the 2009–10 season opener in the Segunda Liga, a 1–0 away loss. On 26 September 2009, he scored his first goal for the side, in a 1–1 away draw to Gil Vicente FC.

On 17 June 2010, Simão moved to F.C. Paços de Ferreira, still on loan. He made his Primeira Liga debut on 14 August in a 1–0 home win over Sporting CP, and only missed five league games (19 starts, 2,051 minutes of action) during the campaign as the team finished in seventh position.

Simão returned to Benfica for 2011–12 but, deemed surplus to requirements by manager Jorge Jesus, he moved to fellow top-tier Académica de Coimbra again on loan, on 17 January 2012. He scored his first goal for his new club on 26 March, netting from 40 yards in a 2–1 defeat at S.C. Braga. On 20 May, he played 69 minutes of a 1–0 victory against Sporting in the final of the Portuguese Cup, their first title in the competition in 73 years.

On 31 July 2012, Simão was loaned to C.S. Marítimo in a season-long move. He terminated his contract with Benfica late into June of the following year, and signed a three-year deal with F.C. Arouca also in the top flight.

Aged 26, Simão moved abroad for the first time in his career, joining First Professional Football League (Bulgaria) club PFC CSKA Sofia for three years. On 28 May 2017, he netted twice in The Eternal Derby to help overcome PFC Levski Sofia 3–0, but left on 31 August of that year to immediately sign with Boavista FC.

Simão moved teams and countries again in January 2019, agreeing to a contract at Royal Antwerp F.C. of the Belgian Pro League. On 22 June, he switched to the Super League Greece with AEK Athens FC, signing until 2022 for an undisclosed fee.

In February 2020, Simão was loaned to Israeli Premier League side Hapoel Be'er Sheva FC. He and compatriots Miguel Vítor and Josué Pesqueira won the Israeli State Cup on 13 July with a 2–0 final victory over Hapoel Petah Tikva FC.

Simão returned to Arouca on 10 January 2022, on a deal running until June 2023. Four years later, having made 131 appearances in his second spell and totalled 222, 14 goals and 19 assists, he left the club; previously, in March 2025, the 34-year-old had undergone surgery after fracturing his tibia.

== Personal life ==
Simão's older brother, Bruno, was also a footballer, in the defender position.

== Career statistics ==
As of match played on 27 May 2023

Appearances and goals by club, season and competition
Club	Season	League			National Cup		League Cup		Europe		Total	
Club	Season	Division	Apps	Goals	Apps	Goals	Apps	Goals	Apps	Goals	Apps	Goals
Benfica	2011–12	Primeira Liga	0	0	2	0	0	0	0	0	2	0
Fátima (loan)	2009–10	Liga de Honra	25	5	2	0	2	0	–		29	5
Paços Ferreira (loan)	2010–11	Primeira Liga	25	0	1	0	6	1	–		32	1
Académica (loan)	2011–12	Primeira Liga	11	1	1	0	0	0	–		12	1
Marítimo (loan)	2012–13	Primeira Liga	26	4	3	0	2	0	6	0	37	4
Arouca	2013–14	Primeira Liga	29	4	3	1	0	0	–		32	5
Arouca	2014–15	Primeira Liga	32	3	1	0	3	0	–		36	3
Arouca	2015–16	Primeira Liga	18	4	3	0	2	0	–		23	4
Arouca	Total		79	11	7	1	5	0	0	0	91	12
CSKA Sofia	2016–17	Bulgarian First League	22	3	0	0	–		–		22	3
CSKA Sofia	2017–18	Bulgarian First League	2	0	0	0	–		–		2	0
CSKA Sofia	Total		24	3	0	0	0	0	0	0	24	3
Boavista	2017–18	Primeira Liga	27	1	0	0	0	0	–		27	1
Boavista	2018–19	Primeira Liga	13	1	2	0	1	0	–		16	1
Boavista	Total		40	2	2	0	1	0	0	0	43	2
Antwerp	2018–19	Belgian Pro League	12	0	0	0	0	0	–		12	0
AEK Athens	2019–20	Super League Greece	4	0	0	0	0	0	3	0	7	0
AEK Athens	2020–21	Super League Greece	0	0	0	0	0	0	—		0	0
AEK Athens	Total		4	0	0	0	0	0	3	0	7	0
Hapoel Be'er Sheva (loan)	2019–20	Israeli Premier League	10	0	3	0	0	0	—		13	0
Moreirense (loan)	2020–21	Primeira Liga	16	0	0	0	0	0	—		16	0
Arouca	2021–22	Primeira Liga	15	1	0	0	0	0	—		15	1
Arouca	2022–23	Primeira Liga	31	0	3	0	5	0	—		39	0
Arouca	Total		46	1	3	0	5	0	0	0	54	1
Career total			318	27	24	1	21	1	9	0	372	29

== Honours ==
Académica

- Taça de Portugal: 2011–12

Hapoel Be'er Sheva

- Israel State Cup: 2019–20

Individual

- SJPF Young Player of the Month: December 2012, January 2013
