= Filipe Neves =

Portuguese footballer (born 2001)

Personal information
- Full name: Filipe Daniel Santos Neves
- Date of birth: 8 May 2001 (age 25)
- Place of birth: Lisbon, Portugal
- Height: 1.84 m (6 ft 1/2 in)
- Position: Goalkeeper

Team information
- Current team: Fabril Barreiro
- Number: 12

Youth career
- 2009–2012: Quinta do Conde
- 2012–2013: Futsal
- 2013–2014: Quinta do Conde
- 2014–2015: Fabril Barreiro
- 2015–2016: Alcochetense
- 2016–2017: Belenenses
- 2017–2019: Cova da Piedade
- 2019–2020: Mafra

Senior career*
Years	Team	Apps	(Gls)
2020–2022	Mafra	3	(0)
2022–	Fabril Barreiro	5	(0)
- * Club domestic league appearances and goals as of 12 February 2023

Filipe Daniel Santos Neves (born 8 May 2001) is a Portuguese professional footballer who plays for Fabril Barreiro as a goalkeeper.

== Football career ==
He made his professional debut for Mafra on 4 April 2021 in the Liga Portugal 2.
