= Anthony D'Alberto =

Congolese footballer (born 1994)

Personal information
- Full name: Anthony D'Albero
- Date of birth: 13 October 1994 (age 32)
- Place of birth: Lubumbashi, Zaire
- Height: 1.78 m (5 ft 10 in)
- Position: Right-back

Team information
- Current team: Torreense
- Number: 27

Youth career
- 2012–2014: Anderlecht
- 2014–2015: VVV-Venlo

Senior career*
| Years | Team | Apps | (Gls) |
| 2015–2018 | Braga B | 70 | (0) |
| 2018 | → Charleroi (loan) | 1 | (0) |
| 2018–2021 | Moreirense | 55 | (0) |
| 2021–2023 | AGF | 31 | (0) |
| 2023–2024 | Torreense | 12 | (0) |

International career
| 2010 | Belgium U17 | 2 | (0) |
- * Club domestic league appearances and goals as of 27 December 2025

Anthony D'Alberto (born 13 October 1994) is a professional footballer who plays as a right-back. Born in Zaire (nowadays Democratic Republic of the Congo) he also holds Belgian citizenship.

== Club career ==
He made his professional debut in the Segunda Liga for Braga B on 3 October 2015 in a game against Portimonense. He joined R. Charleroi on loan on 5 January 2018.

== Personal life ==
D'Alberto was born in Zaire, and is of Congolese, Italian, and Belgian descent.

D'Alberto was involved in a car accident alongside Junior Malanda who lost his life, but D'Alberto and one other were rushed to hospital and survived on Saturday afternoon on the 10 January 2015 around 16:00 pm in Porta Westfalica in northern Germany.
