= Lenny Lobato =

Brazilian professional footballer

Personal information
- Full name: Lenny Ivo Lobato Romanelli
- Date of birth: 3 February 2001 (age 25)
- Place of birth: Búzios, Brazil
- Height: 1.74 m (5 ft 9 in)
- Position: Winger

Team information
- Current team: Ceará
- Number: 77

Youth career
- 2017–2021: Vélez Sarsfield

Senior career*
Years	Team	Apps	(Gls)
2021–	Vélez Sarsfield	40	(2)
2024–2025	→ Sport Recife (loan)	30	(2)
2025–2026	→ Defensa y Justicia (loan)	11	(0)
2026	→ Panetolikos (loan)	16	(1)
2026–	→ Ceará (loan)	9	(1)
- * Club domestic league appearances and goals as of 18 November 2026

Lenny Ivo Lobato Romanelli (born 3 February 2001) is a Brazilian professional footballer who plays as a winger for Ceará.

== Club career ==
Lobato spent six months with Brazilian side Madureira before heading to Argentina. He initially spent time with All Boys of Primera B Nacional, though was unable to remain due to contractual issues. At the age of sixteen, Lobato joined Vélez Sarsfield; via a trial that his El Fortín-supporting uncle had set up, with the help of the latter's brother-in-law Alejandro Chiossi who worked for them. It was Lobato's second trial with Vélez, following one he had aged ten. The winger soon trained with the first-team squad on numerous occasions; under both Gabriel Heinze and Mauricio Pellegrino. In November 2020, Lobato signed his first professional contract.

Lobato was moved into Mauricio Pellegrino's senior squad for the first time on 17 February 2021, as the winger made the bench for a Copa Argentina round of sixty-four encounter with Deportivo Camioneros of Torneo Federal A. With the scoreline at 3–1 to Vélez, Lobato was substituted on in place of Cristian Tarragona for the final seven minutes of the victory at the Estadio Julio Humberto Grondona; he picked up a late yellow card.

== International career ==
Lobato is eligible to represent Argentina or Brazil at international level. He has yet to announce his allegiances for either nation, stating he would treat any call-up equally. He previously stated that he feels more Brazilian than Argentine when in Argentina, but more Argentine than Brazilian when in Brazil. In regards to club football, he said that he hopes to play in Brazilian football at some point in his career.

== Personal life ==
Lobato is the grandson of 20th century Argentine dancer and actress Nelida Lobato. His family, including parents Gabriela and Adrián, were born in Argentina, though Lobato was born in Búzios, Brazil and remained in that country until joining Vélez Sarsfield in 2017.

== Career statistics ==
As of 18 February 2021.

Appearances and goals by club, season and competition
Club	Season	League			Cup		League Cup		Continental		Other		Total	
Club	Season	Division	Apps	Goals	Apps	Goals	Apps	Goals	Apps	Goals	Apps	Goals	Apps	Goals
Vélez Sarsfield	2021 (Note: Soccerway counts Copa de la Liga Profesional appearances as league appearances.)	Primera División	0	0	1	0	—		0	0	0	0	1	0
Career total			0	0	1	0	—		0	0	0	0	1	0
