= 2024 Botafogo FR season =

Botafogo
2024 season
- President: Durcesio Mello
- Manager: Tiago Nunes (until 22 February); Fábio Matias (interim, from 23 February to 3 April); Artur Jorge (from 5 April)
- Stadium: Estádio Olímpico Nilton Santos (main); Maracanã
- Série A: 1st 3rd time
- Campeonato Carioca: Taça Guanabara 5th Taça Rio Winners
- Copa do Brasil: Round of 16
- Copa Libertadores: Winners
- FIFA Intercontinental Cup: Second round
- Top goalscorer: League: Jefferson Savarino (8); All: Júnior Santos (20)
- Highest home attendance: 64,727 vs Criciúma
- Average home league attendance: 27,412
- Biggest win: Botafogo 6–0 Aurora
- Biggest defeat: Botafogo 0–3 Cruzeiro
Home colours	Away colours	Third colours

The 2024 season was Botafogo's 120th in existence and the third consecutive year in the top flight. They played in the Série A, the Campeonato Carioca, the Copa Libertadores and the FIFA Intercontinental Cup.

== Players ==
=== First-team squad ===
As of 20 September 2024

Note: Flags indicate national team as defined under FIFA eligibility rules; some limited exceptions apply. Players may hold more than one non-FIFA nationality.

No.	Pos.	Nation	Player
1	GK	PAR	Gatito Fernández (vice-captain)
2	DF	BRA	Rafael
3	DF	BRA	Lucas Halter
4	DF	URU	Mateo Ponte
5	MF	BRA	Danilo Barbosa
6	MF	BRA	Tchê Tchê (captain)
7	FW	BRA	Luiz Henrique
9	FW	BRA	Tiquinho Soares
10	FW	VEN	Jefferson Savarino
11	FW	BRA	Júnior Santos
12	GK	BRA	John
13	DF	BRA	Alex Telles
15	DF	ANG	Bastos
16	DF	BRA	Hugo
17	MF	BRA	Marlon Freitas
20	DF	ARG	Alexander Barboza
21	DF	BRA	Marçal
22	DF	BRA	Vitinho
23	MF	ARG	Thiago Almada

No.	Pos.	Nation	Player
25	MF	BRA	Kauê
26	MF	BRA	Gregore
27	FW	BRA	Carlos Alberto
28	MF	BRA	Allan
30	GK	BRA	Lucas Barreto
33	MF	BRA	Eduardo
34	DF	BRA	Adryelson (on loan from Lyon)
37	FW	BRA	Matheus Martins
38	DF	BRA	Jefferson Maciel
47	FW	BRA	Jeffinho (on loan from Lyon)
66	DF	BRA	Cuiabano
67	FW	BRA	Yarlen
70	MF	PAR	Óscar Romero
79	FW	BRA	Fabiano
90	FW	BRA	Matheus Nascimento
91	DF	BRA	Pablo (on loan from Flamengo)
97	GK	BRA	Raul
99	FW	BRA	Igor Jesus

=== Botafogo B and Youth Academy ===
Note: Flags indicate national team as defined under FIFA eligibility rules; some limited exceptions apply. Players may hold more than one non-FIFA nationality.

No.	Pos.	Nation	Player
48	MF	BRA	Rhuan
49	FW	BRA	Sapata
63	DF	BRA	Serafim
72	DF	BRA	Luís Octávio
76	DF	BRA	Devid

No.	Pos.	Nation	Player
—	DF	USA	Esteban Espinosa
—	MF	BRA	Bernardo Valim
—	MF	BRA	JP Galvão
—	FW	TTO	Darius Lewis

=== Out on loan ===
Note: Flags indicate national team as defined under FIFA eligibility rules; some limited exceptions apply. Players may hold more than one non-FIFA nationality.

No.	Pos.	Nation	Player
—	GK	BRA	Igo Gabriel (to Confiança until 30 November 2024)
—	GK	BRA	João Fernando (to São Bento until 31 October 2024)
—	DF	BRA	Daniel Borges (to América Mineiro until 31 December 2024)
—	DF	BRA	Henrique Vermudt (to Ferroviário until 30 November 2024)
—	DF	BRA	Kawan (to Estrela da Amadora until 30 June 2025)
—	DF	ECU	Luis Segovia (to CRB until 30 November 2024)
—	DF	BRA	Philipe Sampaio (to Atlético Goianiense until 31 December 2024)
—	DF	BRA	Vitor Marinho (to ABC until 30 November 2024)
—	MF	BRA	Breno (to São Bernardo until 30 November 2024)
—	MF	URU	Diego Hernández (to León until 30 June 2025)

No.	Pos.	Nation	Player
—	MF	BRA	Luís Oyama (to Juventude until 31 December 2024)
—	MF	BRA	Newton (to Criciúma until 31 December 2024)
—	MF	BRA	Patrick de Paula (at Criciúma until 31 December 2024)
—	MF	BRA	Raí (to CRB until 30 November 2024)
—	FW	BRA	Chay (to CRB until 30 November 2024)
—	FW	BRA	Emerson Urso (to Vila Nova until 30 November 2024)
—	FW	BRA	Gustavo Sauer (to Cuiabá until 31 December 2024)
—	FW	PAR	Matías Segovia (to Al-Ain until 30 June 2025)
—	FW	URU	Valentín Adamo (to Union Española until 31 December 2024)

== Kits ==
Home	Alt. Home	Away	Third	Fourth	Home (R1-4)	Away (R1-21)	Third (R1-24)

== Transfers ==
=== In ===
Pos.	Player	Transferred from	Fee	Date	Source
FW	(Brazil) Carlos Alberto	(Brazil) América Mineiro	R$5 million	1 January 2024	
MF	(Brazil) Jeffinho	(France) Lyon	Loan	5 January 2024	
DF	(Argentina) Alexander Barboza	(Paraguay) Libertad	Free	8 January 2024	
MF	(Venezuela) Jefferson Savarino	(United States) Real Salt Lake	$2,700,000	11 January 2024	
MF	(Brazil) Luiz Henrique	(Spain) Real Betis	€16,000,000	1 February 2024	
MF	(Paraguay) Matías Segovia	(Belgium) RWD Molenbeek	Loan	1 February 2024	
DF	(Uruguay) Damián Suárez	Unattatched	Free	9 February 2024	
MF	(Brazil) Gregore	(United States) Inter Miami	€2,500,000	19 February 2024	
MF	(Paraguay) Óscar Romero	Unattached	Free	18 March 2024	
GK	(Brazil) João Fernando	(Brazil) Boavista	Loan return	16 April 2024	
DF	(Brazil) Cuiabano	(Brazil) Grêmio	€1,400,000	19 April 2024	
GK	(Brazil) Gabriel Toebe Studt	(Brazil) Avenida	Loan return	1 May 2024	
FW	(Brazil) Carlos Alberto	(Belgium) RWD Molenbeek	Loan return	30 June 2024	
MF	(Paraguay) Matías Segovia	(Belgium) RWD Molenbeek	Loan return	30 June 2024	
MF	(Brazil) Allan	(United Arab Emirates) Al Wahda	Free	10 July 2024	
FW	(Brazil) Igor Jesus	(United Arab Emirates) Shabab Al Ahli	Free	10 July 2024	
MF	(Argentina) Thiago Almada	(United States) Atlanta United FC	$21,000,000	10 July 2024	
MF	(Brazil) Matheus Martins	(Italy) Udinese	€10,000,000	30 July 2024	
MF	(France) Mohamed El Arouch	(France) Lyon	Undisclosed	21 August 2024	
DF	(Brazil) Vitinho	(England) Burnley	Undisclosed	30 August 2024	
DF	(Brazil) Adryelson	(France) Lyon	Loan	2 September 2024	
DF	(Brazil) Alex Telles	Unattached	Free	3 September 2024	

=== Out ===
Pos.	Player	Transferred to	Fee	Date	Source
FW	(Spain) Diego Costa	(Brazil) Grêmio	End of contract	1 January 2024	
GK	(Brazil) João Fernando	(Brazil) Boavista	Loan	1 January 2024	
GK	(Brazil) Gabriel Toebe Studt	(Brazil) Avenida	Loan	1 January 2024	
FW	(Brazil) Carlos Alberto	(Belgium) RWD Molenbeek	Loan	10 January 2024	
MF	(Paraguay) Matías Segovia	(United Arab Emirates) Al Ain	Loan	27 July 2024	
MF	(Uruguay) Diego Hernández	(Mexico) Club León	Loan	29 July 2024	
MF	(Nicaragua) Jacob Montes	(Belgium) RWD Molenbeek	Free	30 July 2024	
MF	(Brazil) Patrick de Paula	(Brazil) Criciúma	Loan	22 August 2024	
DF	(Brazil) Jefferson Maciel	(Portugal) Portimonense	Undisclosed	24 August 2024	
DF	(Ecuador) Luis Segovia	(Brazil) CRB	Loan	29 August 2024	
DF	(Uruguay) Damián Suárez	(Uruguay) Peñarol	Contract termination	2 September 2024	
MF	(France) Mohamed El Arouch		Released	20 September 2024	

== Competitions ==
=== Overall record ===
Competition	First match	Last match	Starting round	Final position	Record							
Competition	First match	Last match	Starting round	Final position	Pld	W	D	L	GF	GA	GD	Win %
Série A	14 April 2024	8 December 2024	Matchday 1	Winner	38	23	10	5	59	29	+30	60.53
Campeonato Carioca	17 January 2024	31 March 2024	Taça Guanabara	5th Taça Rio winners	15	10	2	3	29	13	+16	66.67
Copa do Brasil	2 May 2024	7 August 2024	Third round	Round of 16	4	2	1	1	4	3	+1	50.00
Copa Libertadores	22 February 2024	30 November 2024	Second stage	Winners	17	8	6	3	31	17	+14	47.06
FIFA Intercontinental Cup	11 December 2024		Second round	Second round	1	0	0	1	0	3	−3	0.00
Total					75	43	19	13	123	65	+58	57.33

Source: Soccerway

=== Série A ===
==== League table ====
Pos	Team	Pld	W	D	L	GF	GA	GD	Pts	Qualification or relegation
1	Botafogo (C)	38	23	10	5	59	29	+30	79	Qualification for Copa Libertadores group stage (Note: Botafogo and Flamengo qualified for the Copa Libertadores group stage by winning the 2024 Copa Libertadores and the 2024 Copa do Brasil, respectively.)
2	Palmeiras	38	22	7	9	60	33	+27	73	Qualification for Copa Libertadores group stage
3	Flamengo	38	20	10	8	61	42	+19	70	Qualification for Copa Libertadores group stage
4	Fortaleza	38	19	11	8	53	39	+14	68	Qualification for Copa Libertadores group stage
5	Internacional	38	18	11	9	53	36	+17	65	Qualification for Copa Libertadores group stage

Source: CBF
Rules for classification: 1) points; 2) wins; 3) goal difference; 4) goals scored; 5) head-to-head results (only between two teams); 6) fewest red cards; 7) fewest yellow cards; 8) drawing of lots.
(C) Champions

==== Results summary ====
Overall								Home						Away					
Pld	W	D	L	GF	GA	GD	Pts	W	D	L	GF	GA	GD	W	D	L	GF	GA	GD
38	23	10	5	59	29	+30	79	12	5	2	31	13	+18	11	5	3	28	16	+12

Source: Worldfootball

==== Results by round ====
Round	1	2	3	4	5	6	7	8	9	10	11	12	13	14	15	16	17	18	19	20	21	22	23	24	25	26	27	28	29	30	31	32	33	34	35	36	37	38
Ground	A	H	H	A	H	A	A	H	A	H	A	H	A	A	H	A	H	H	A	H	A	A	H	A	H	H	A	H	A	H	A	H	H	A	H	A	A	H
Result	L	W	W	W	L	D	W	W	W	D	L	W	D	W	W	W	W	W	D	L	W	L	W	D	W	W	W	D	W	D	W	W	D	D	D	W	W	W
Position	14	9	3	1	3	4	3	3	1	2	4	3	3	2	2	1	1	1	1	2	1	1	1	2	1	1	1	1	1	1	1	1	1	1	2	1	1	1

Updated to match(es) played on 4 December 2024. Source: Worldfootball
A = Away; H = Home; W = Win; D = Draw; L = Loss

==== Matches ====
The match schedule was released on 29 February.

14 April 2024 1	Cruzeiro	3–2	Botafogo	Belo Horizonte
17:00 UTC−3	Lucas Silva 20'; Arthur (yellow card) 31'; Zé Ivaldo (yellow card) 36'; Rafael Silva 64', (yellow card) 66'; Rafael Elias 90+1', (yellow card) 90+2'		Tiquinho 5'; Gregore (yellow card) 27'; Júnior Santos (yellow card) 36'; Barboza (red card) 72'; Danilo 83', (yellow card) 84'	Stadium: Mineirão; Attendance: 20,701; Referee: Matheus Delgado Candançan

18 April 2024 2	Botafogo	1–0	Atlético Goianiense	Rio de Janeiro
21:30 UTC−3	Halter (yellow card) 15'; Tiquinho (yellow card) 30'; Ponte 32'; Patrick (yellow card) 90'		Pedro Henrique (yellow card) 2'; Luiz Felipe (yellow card) 21'; Bruno Tubarão (yellow card) 43'; Rhaldney (yellow card) 63'	Stadium: Estádio Nilton Santos; Attendance: 8,508; Referee: Luiz Flavio de Oliveira

21 April 2024 3	Botafogo	5–1	Juventude	Rio de Janeiro
18:30 UTC−3	Júnior Santos 5'; Tiquinho 9' (pen.); Jeffinho (yellow card) 35'; Danilo 53'; Savarino 61'; Marlon Freitas (yellow card) 77'; Montes 80'; Hernández (yellow card) 90+1'		Lucas Freitas (yellow card) 8' (yellow-red card) 38'; Gabriel Inocêncio (yellow card) 18'; Gabriel (yellow card) 38'; Danilo Boza 85'	Stadium: Estádio Nilton Santos; Attendance: 13,273; Referee: Arthur Gomes Rabelo

28 April 2024 4	Flamengo	0–2	Botafogo	Rio de Janeiro
11:00 UTC−3	De la Cruz (yellow card) 59'		Savarino (yellow card) 15'; Danilo Barbosa (yellow card) 43'; Luiz Henrique 53', (yellow card) 57'; Jeffinho (yellow card) 79'; Savarino 90+3'	Stadium: Maracanã; Attendance: 53,683; Referee: Raphael Claus

5 May 2024 5	Botafogo	1–2	Bahia	Rio de Janeiro
18:30 UTC−3	Jeffinho 63'		Everaldo 45+3' (pen.); Ratão 86'	Stadium: Estádio Nilton Santos; Attendance: 22,685; Referee: Rafael Rodrigo Klein

12 May 2024 6	Fortaleza	1–1	Botafogo	Fortaleza
16:00 UTC−3	Pochettino 10'; Titi (yellow card) 24'; Hércules (yellow card) 49'; Brítez (yellow card) 90+4'; Lucero (yellow card) 90+5'		John (yellow card) 1'; Danilo 41'; Romero (yellow card) 54'; Ponte (yellow card) 60'; Cuiabano (yellow card) 74'; Hernández (yellow card) 81'; Barboza (yellow card) 88'	Stadium: Castelão; Attendance: 15,914; Referee: Wilton Sampaio

2 June 2024 7	Corinthians	0–1	Botafogo	São Paulo
21:00 UTC−3	Wesley (yellow card) 34'; Félix Torres (yellow card) 40'		Luiz Henrique (yellow card) 29'; Júnior Santos 59'; Romero (yellow card) 64'; Danilo (yellow card) 71'; Marlon Freitas (yellow card) 79'	Stadium: Neo Química Arena; Attendance: 41,281; Referee: Anderson Daronco

12 June 2024 8	Botafogo	1–0	Fluminense	Rio de Janeiro
20:00 UTC−3	Tiquinho (yellow card) 15'; Tchê Tchê (yellow card) 45+5'; Bastos 66'; Suárez (yellow card) 74'		Martinelli (yellow card) 11'; Ganso (yellow card) 45+5'; Marcelo (yellow card) 74'	Stadium: Estádio Nilton Santos; Attendance: 27,239; Referee: Flavio Rodrigues de Souza

16 June 2024 9	Grêmio	1–2	Botafogo	Cariacica
18:30 UTC−3	Gustavo Nunes 21', (yellow card) 39'; Carballo (yellow card) 78'; Everton (yellow card) 81'		Cuiabano 10'; Gregore (yellow card) 45'; Júnior Santos 57'; Suárez (yellow card) 81'; Yarlen (yellow card) 83'	Stadium: Estádio Kléber Andrade; Attendance: 15,811; Referee: Paulo Cesar Zanovelli da Silva

19 June 2024 10	Botafogo	1–1	Athletico Paranaense	Rio de Janeiro
19:00 UTC−3	Bastos 90+8'		Erick (yellow card) 42'; Mastriani 53'; Christian (yellow card) 76'; Lucas Esquivel (yellow card) 77'; Pablo (yellow card) 85'; Alex Santana (yellow card) 90'	Stadium: Estádio Nilton Santos; Attendance: 19,589; Referee: Ramon Abatti

22 June 2024 11	Criciúma	2–1	Botafogo	Criciúma
16:00 UTC−3	Barreto 10'; Tobias Figueiredo (yellow card) 43'; Claudinho (yellow card) 79'; Arthur 84'; Allano (yellow card) 90+4'; Gustavo (yellow card) 90+7'		Barboza (yellow card) 21'; Halter 55'; Gregore (yellow card) 64'; Romero (yellow card) 70'	Stadium: Estádio Heriberto Hülse; Attendance: 16,256; Referee: Luiz Flávio

26 June 2024 12	Botafogo	2–1	Red Bull Bragantino	Rio de Janeiro
19:00 UTC−3	Carlos Eduardo 21', 52'; Marçal (yellow card) 45'; Halter (yellow card) 68'		Evangelista 6'; Helinho (yellow card) 45'; Lincoln (yellow card) 52'; Pedro Henrique (yellow card) 76'	Stadium: Estádio Nilton Santos; Attendance: 13,333; Referee: Gustavo Ervino Bauermann

29 June 2024 13	Vasco da Gama	1–1	Botafogo	Rio de Janeiro
18:30 UTC−3	Victor Luis (yellow card) 34'; Hugo Moura (yellow card) 40'; João Victor (yellow card) 77'; Vegetti 84'		Bastos (yellow card) 45+1', (goal) 73'; Gatito (yellow card) 45+3'; Júnior Santos (yellow card) 59'; Patrick (yellow card) 90+4'	Stadium: São Januário; Attendance: 16,121; Referee: Ramon Abatti

3 July 2024 14	Cuiabá	1–2	Botafogo	Cuiabá
18:00 UTC−4	Empereur (yellow card) 26'; Pitta 45' (pen.); Filipe Augusto (yellow card) 54'; André Luis (yellow card) 85'; Railan (yellow card) 90'		Kauê 5'; Romero (yellow card) 72'; Ponte 75'	Stadium: Arena Pantanal; Attendance: 7,849; Referee: Paulo Cesar Zanovelli da Silva

7 July 2024 15	Botafogo	3–0	Atlético Mineiro	Rio de Janeiro
20:30 UTC−3	Luiz Henrique 13'; Bastos (yellow card) 17'; Tiquinho (yellow card) 20'; Cuiabano 79'; Savarino 90+4'		Palacios (yellow card) 17'; Rabello (red card) 24'	Stadium: Estádio Nilton Santos; Attendance: 21,582; Referee: Rafael Rodrigo Klein

11 July 2024 16	Vitória	0–1	Botafogo	Salvador
21:30 UTC−3	Muriel (yellow card) 90+6'; Janderson (yellow card) 90+10'		Carlos Eduardo (yellow card) 37', (penalty missed) 56'; Savarino 62'; Gregore (yellow card) 76'; Hernández (yellow card) 90+7'	Stadium: Barradão; Attendance: 16,549; Referee: Ramon Abatti

17 July 2024 17	Botafogo	1–0	Palmeiras	Rio de Janeiro
21:30 UTC−3	Barboza (yellow card) 4'; Tiquinho 56'; Suárez (yellow card) 73'			Stadium: Estádio Nilton Santos; Attendance: 39,570; Referee: Anderson Daronco

20 July 2024 18	Botafogo	1–0	Internacional	Rio de Janeiro
18:30 UTC−3	Cuiabano (yellow card) 33'; Luiz Henrique 38'; Suárez (yellow card) 51'; Savarino (yellow card) 78'		Rômulo (yellow card) 51'; Igor Gomes (yellow card) 78'	Stadium: Estádio Nilton Santos; Attendance: 31,344; Referee: Flavio Rodrigues de Souza

24 July 2024 19	São Paulo	2–2	Botafogo	São Paulo
19:30 UTC−3	Lucas Moura 6' (pen.), (yellow card) 51'; Rafinha (yellow card) 24'; Welington (yellow card) 45+5'; Alan Franco (yellow card) 59'; Ferreira 60'; Luciano (yellow card) 76'		Tiquinho Soares 11' (pen.); Gregore (yellow card) 39'; Marlon Freitas (yellow card) 62'; Cuiabano 22', (yellow card) 63'	Stadium: Estádio do Morumbi; Attendance: 53,244; Referee: Felipe Fernandes de Lima

27 July 2024 20	Botafogo	0–3	Cruzeiro	Rio de Janeiro
21:30 UTC−3	Marçal (yellow card) 4'; Allan (yellow card) 74'		William 13', (yellow card) 31'; Díaz 37'; Matheus Henrique (yellow card) 45+6'; Cássio (yellow card) 72'; Barreal 77'; Xavier (yellow card) 90+1'	Stadium: Estádio Nilton Santos; Attendance: 24,057; Referee: Wilton Sampaio

3 August 2024 21	Atlético Goianiense	1–4	Botafogo	Goiânia
20:00 UTC−3	Campbell 43' (pen.), (yellow card) 90+1'; Romão (yellow card) 53'; Adriano Martins (yellow card) 60'; Janderson (red card) 90+3'		Carlos Alberto 21'; Igor Jesus (yellow card) 44', (goal) 68'; Allan (yellow card) 65'; Luiz Henrique (yellow card) 79', (goal) 88' (pen.); Romero 81' (pen.); Tchê Tchê (red card) 90+3'	Stadium: Estádio Antônio Accioly; Attendance: 8,618; Referee: Felipe Fernandes De Lima

11 August 2024 22	Juventude	3–2	Botafogo	Caxias do Sul
11:00 UTC−3	Danilo Boza 9'; Davi Goes (yellow card) 14'; Erick (yellow card) 41'; Carrillo 45+4'; Marcelinho 48'; Mateus Claus (yellow card) 85'		Romero (yellow card) 29'; Barboza (yellow card) 42'; Cuiabano 69'; Marlon Freitas (yellow card) 73'; Marçal 81', (yellow card) 82'; Halter (yellow card) 90+7'	Stadium: Estádio Alfredo Jaconi; Attendance: 5,288; Referee: Flavio Rodrigues de Souza

18 August 2024 23	Botafogo	4–1	Flamengo	Rio de Janeiro
18:30 UTC−3	Ponte 3', (yellow card) 52'; Cuiabano (yellow card) 33'; Igor Jesus 54'; Barboza (yellow card) 56'; Almada (penalty missed) 67'; Matheus Martins 84', 90+4'; Savarino (yellow card) 86'		Bruno Henrique 24'; Ayrton (yellow card) 63'; Carlinhos (yellow card) 70'	Stadium: Estádio Nilton Santos; Attendance: 25,888; Referee: Bruno Arleu De Araújo

25 August 2024 24	Bahia	0–0	Botafogo	Salvador
16:00 UTC−3	Jean Lucas (yellow card) 25'; Caio Alexandre (yellow card) 35'; Marcos Felipe (yellow card) 41'; Arias (yellow card) 71'		Gregore (yellow card) 32'; Marlon Freitas (yellow card) 35'; Halter (yellow card) 54'; Marçal (yellow card) 84'	Stadium: Arena Fonte Nova; Attendance: 39,625; Referee: Ramon Abatti

31 August 2024 25	Botafogo	2–0	Fortaleza	Rio de Janeiro
21:00 UTC−3	Gregore (yellow card) 44'; Bastos (yellow card) 72'; Igor Jesus 73', 90+1'; Marçal (yellow card) 90+1'		Cardona (yellow card) 40'; Brítez (yellow card) 49'; Pedro Augusto (yellow card) 90'; Andrade (yellow card) 90+4'	Stadium: Estádio Nilton Santos; Attendance: 32,564; Referee: Flávio Rodrigues de Souza

14 September 2024 26	Botafogo	2–1	Corinthians	Rio de Janeiro
21:00 UTC−3	Luiz Henrique 39'; Almada 67'		Romero (penalty missed) 44'; Garro 63' (pen.)	Stadium: Estádio Nilton Santos; Attendance: 32,691; Referee: Anderson Daronco

21 September 2024 27	Fluminense	0–1	Botafogo	Rio de Janeiro
18:30 UTC−3	Felipe Melo (yellow card) 82'		Tchê Tchê (yellow card) 90+4'; Luiz Henrique 90+5'	Stadium: Maracanã; Attendance: 29,710; Referee: Wilton Sampaio

28 September 2024 28	Botafogo	0–0	Grêmio	Brasília
21:00 UTC−3	Bastos (yellow card) 12'; Luiz Henrique (yellow card) 87'; Igor Jesus (yellow card) 90+5'; Marlon Freitas (yellow card) 90+10'		Villasanti (yellow card) 66'; Kannemann (yellow card) 83'; Marchesín (yellow card) 87'; Monsalve (red card) 89'	Stadium: Estádio Nacional Mané Garrincha; Attendance: 30,735; Referee: Maguielson Lima Barbosa

5 October 2024 29	Athletico Paranaense	0–1	Botafogo	Curitiba
16:30 UTC−3	Madson (yellow card) 75'; Kaique Rocha (yellow card) 76'		Igor Jesus 14'; Gregore (yellow card) 43'; Danilo Barbosa (yellow card) 84'; Tiquinho (yellow card) 90'; Matheus Martins (yellow card) 90+3'	Stadium: Ligga Arena; Attendance: 22,726; Referee: Flavio Rodrigues De Souza

18 October 2024 30	Botafogo	1–1	Criciúma	Rio de Janeiro
20:00 UTC−3	Tiquinho 90+1'; Barboza (yellow card) 90+14'		Allano (yellow card) 56'; Felipe Vizeu 90+4', (yellow card) 90+5'	Stadium: Maracanã; Attendance: 64,727; Referee: Matheus Delgado Candançan

26 October 2024 31	Red Bull Bragantino	0–1	Botafogo	Bragança Paulista
19:00 UTC−3	Jadsom (yellow card) 58'		Gregore 86'; Bastos (yellow card) 90+4'	Stadium: Estádio Nabi Abi Chedid; Attendance: 7,303; Referee: Anderson Daronco

5 November 2024 32	Botafogo	3–0	Vasco da Gama	Rio de Janeiro
21:30 UTC−3	Savarino 9'; Luiz Henrique 12'; Júnior Santos 71'		João Victor (yellow card) 38' (yellow-red card) 43'; Paulo Henrique (yellow card) 76'	Stadium: Estádio Nilton Santos; Attendance: 32,007; Referee: Bruno Arleu de Araújo

9 November 2024 33	Botafogo	0–0	Cuiabá	Rio de Janeiro
16:30 UTC−3			Derik (yellow card) 45'; Denilson (yellow card) 48'; Ramon (yellow card) 51'; Bruno Alves (yellow card) 56'; Walter (yellow card) 80'; Gabriel (yellow card) 90+3'	Stadium: Estádio Nilton Santos; Attendance: 41,899; Referee: Rodrigo José Pereira de Lima

20 November 2024 34	Atlético Mineiro	0–0	Botafogo	Belo Horizonte
21:30 UTC−3	Rubens (yellow card) 37' (yellow-red card) 40'; Deyverson (yellow card) 45'; Lyanco (yellow card) 71'; Matheus Mendes (yellow card) 77'; Zaracho (yellow card) 82'; Igor Rabello (yellow card) 90+7'		Barboza (yellow card) 90+3' (yellow-red card) 90+7'; Luiz Henrique (red card) 90+10'	Stadium: Arena Independência; Attendance: 0 Referee: Luiz Flávio de Oliveira
Note: The match was moved from Arena MRV to Arena Independência due to the closure of the latter as a penalty following incidents during the Copa do Brasil final.

23 November 2024 35	Botafogo	1–1	Vitória	Rio de Janeiro
19:30 UTC−3	Gregore (yellow card) 36'; Ponte (yellow card) 68'; Wagner Leonardo 87' (o.g.); Cuiabano (yellow card) 90+3'; Tiquinho (red card) 90+7'		Alerrandro 20'; Willian Oliveira (yellow card) 63'; Patric (yellow card) 82'; Esteves (yellow card) 90+4'; Carlos Eduardo (yellow card) 90+4'	Stadium: Estádio Nilton Santos; Attendance: 35,491; Referee: Ramon Abatti

26 November 2024 36	Palmeiras	1–3	Botafogo	São Paulo
21:30 UTC−3	Rocha (red card) 70'; Mayke (yellow card) 83'; Ríos 90+3'; Gómez (yellow card) 90+6'		Gregore 19'; Telles (yellow card) 45+4'; Barboza (yellow card) 46'; John (yellow card) 58'; Almada (yellow card) 62'; Savarino 73'; Adryelson 89'	Stadium: Allianz Parque; Attendance: 31,753; Referee: Wilton Sampaio

4 December 2024 37	Internacional	0–1	Botafogo	Porto Alegre
21:30 UTC−3	Bruno Henrique (yellow card) 27'; Rochet (yellow card) 45+1'; Wesley (yellow card) 45+2'; Bernabei (yellow card) 59'; Wanderson (yellow card) 90+3'		Savarino 5'; Barboza (yellow card) 45+3'	Stadium: Estádio Beira-Rio; Attendance: 40,801; Referee: Ramon Abatti

8 December 2024 38	Botafogo	2–1	São Paulo	Rio de Janeiro
16:00 UTC−3	Savarino 37'; Gregore 90+2'		William Gomes 63'	Stadium: Estádio Nilton Santos; Attendance: 41,986; Referee: Anderson Daronco

=== Campeonato Carioca ===
==== Taça Guanabara ====
Pos	Team	Pld	W	D	L	GF	GA	GD	Pts	Qualification
3	Vasco da Gama	11	6	4	1	20	10	+10	22	Advance to semifinals
4	Fluminense	11	6	3	2	17	11	+6	21	Advance to semifinals
5	Botafogo	11	6	2	3	19	11	+8	20	Advance to Taça Rio semifinals
6	Boavista	11	5	3	3	18	21	−3	18	Advance to Taça Rio semifinals
7	Portuguesa	11	3	5	3	9	12	−3	14	Advance to Taça Rio semifinals

Source: FERJ
Rules for classification: 1) points; 2) wins; 3) goal difference; 4) goals scored; 5) head-to-head results; 6) disciplinary record; 7) random draw.

17 January 2024 1	Botafogo	1–0	Madureira	Rio de Janeiro
19:00 UTC−3	Barboza (yellow card) 23'; Jeffinho 39'; Halter (yellow card) 55'; Tchê Tchê (yellow card) 82'; Newton (yellow card) 90+2'		Arthur Lourenço (yellow card) 88'; Wagninho (yellow card) 90+3'; Fábio Matos (yellow card) 90+8'	Stadium: Estádio Nilton Santos; Attendance: 7,874; Referee: Alexandre Vargas Tavares de Jesus

20 January 2024 2	Botafogo	2–0	Bangu	Rio de Janeiro
16:00 UTC−3	Júnior Santos 3'; Jeffinho 90+7'			Stadium: Estádio Nilton Santos; Attendance: 6,474; Referee: Yuri Elino Ferreira da Cruz

24 January 2024 3	Boavista	1–0	Botafogo	Saquarema
21:30 UTC−3	Leonardo Sheldon Martins 35'			Stadium: Estádio Elcyr Resende de Mendonça; Attendance: 2,588; Referee: Alex Gomes Stefano

27 January 2024 4	Botafogo	2–0	Sampaio Corrêa	Rio de Janeiro
16:00 UTC−3	Júnior Santos 55'; Jeffinho 90+6'			Stadium: Estádio Nilton Santos; Attendance: 6,104; Referee: Lucas Coelho Santos

30 January 2024 5	Botafogo	1–1	Portuguesa RJ	Rio de Janeiro
21:30 UTC−3	Tiquinho Soares 21'		Anderson Indalêncio da Rosa 55'	Stadium: Estádio Nilton Santos; Attendance: 4,241; Referee: Bruno Mota Correia

3 February 2024 6	Botafogo	2–2	Nova Iguaçu	Gama
16:00 UTC−3	Halter 46'; Carlos Eduardo 67' (pen.)		Carlinhos 69', 89'	Stadium: Estádio Walmir Campelo Bezerra; Attendance: 5,710; Referee: Alexandre Vargas Tavares de Jesus

7 February 2024 7	Flamengo	1–0	Botafogo	Rio de Janeiro
21:30 UTC−3	Everton (yellow card) 45+3'; Pulgar (yellow card) 90+7'; Léo Pereira 90+9'		Júnior Santos (yellow card) 45+2'; Halter (yellow card) 50'; Barboza (yellow card) 73'	Stadium: Maracanã; Attendance: 46,798; Referee: Yuri Elino Ferreira da Cruz

14 February 2024 8	Volta Redonda	0–3	Botafogo	Volta Redonda
19:00 UTC−3	Danrley (yellow card) 15'; Wellington Silva (yellow card) 45+3'; Bruno Barra (yellow card) 62' (yellow-red card) 90+8'; Paulo Henrique (yellow card) 72'		Bastos 9'; Jefferson Savarino 22'; Tiquinho Soares (yellow card) 25'; Júnior Santos 90'; Janderson (red card) 90+4'; Gatito (yellow card) 90+9'	Stadium: Estádio Raulino de Oliveira; Attendance: 5,289; Referee: André Rodrigo Rocha

18 February 2024 9	Botafogo	2–4	Vasco da Gama	Rio de Janeiro
16:00 UTC−3	Carlos Eduardo 21', 88'; Danilo (yellow card) 51'; Júnior Santos 76'; Tchê Tchê (yellow card) 89'; Emerson Urso (yellow card) 90+7'		Galdames 31', (yellow card) 45'; Piton 46'; Paulo (yellow card) 64'; Vegetti 68' (pen.); Gatito 85' (o.g.); Robert Rojas (yellow card) 90+8'	Stadium: Estádio Nilton Santos; Attendance: 25,673; Referee: Wagner do Nascimento Magalhaes

24 February 2024 10	Audax Rio	0–2	Botafogo	Rio de Janeiro
16:00 UTC−3	Arlen (yellow card) 45+4'; Miticov (yellow card) 55'; Paulo Victor (yellow card) 90'		Hernández 3'; Marçal (yellow card) 44'; Janderson 48'; Gregore (yellow card) 76'; Matheus Nascimento (yellow card) 90'	Stadium: Estádio Nilton Santos; Attendance: 1,446; Referee: Bruno Mota Correia

3 March 2024 11	Fluminense	2–4	Botafogo	Rio de Janeiro
16:00 UTC−3	Lelê 26', (yellow card) 55'; John Kennedy (yellow card) 42', (goal) 86' (pen.); André (red card) 88'; Felipe Alves (yellow card) 90+11'		Marlon Freitas 3', 90' (pen.); Raí 15'; Gregore (yellow card) 42'; Halter (yellow card) 45+2'; Marçal (yellow card) 53'; Ponte (yellow card) 57'; Emerson Urso (yellow card) 78', (goal) 90+13'; Suárez (yellow card) 83'; Gatito (yellow card) 84'	Stadium: Maracanã; Attendance: 21,492; Referee: Felipe da Silva Gonçalves

==== Taca Rio ====
===== Semi-finals =====
10 March 2024 First leg	Sampaio Corrêa	1–2	Botafogo	Saquarema
16:00 UTC−3	Rafael Pernão (yellow card) 89'; Índio 90+2'; Gabriel Agú (yellow card) 90+7'	Report	Emerson Urso (yellow card) 19'; Raí (yellow card) 53'; Yarlen 82'; Bastos (yellow card) 90+3'; Kauê (yellow card) 90+7'; Sapata 90+8'	Stadium: Estádio Elcyr Resende de Mendonça; Attendance: 2,214; Referee: André Rodrigo Rocha

17 March 2024 Second leg	Botafogo	2–1 (4–2 agg.)	Sampaio Corrêa	Rio de Janeiro
18:30 UTC−3	Júnior Santos 80' (pen.); Janderson (yellow card) 84'; Savarino 90+6'	Report	Marcelo (yellow card) 20'; Octávio 22', (yellow card) 45+3'; Gabriel Agú (yellow card) 37'; Abner (yellow card) 56'; Diogo (red card) 81'; Josiel (yellow card) 90+8'	Stadium: Estádio Nilton Santos; Attendance: 5,204; Referee: Felipe da Silva Gonçalves

===== Final =====
27 March 2024 First leg	Boavista	0–4	Botafogo	Saquarema
19:30 UTC−3			Tiquinho 15', 70'; Júnior Santos 89'; Yarlen 90+1'	Stadium: Estádio Elcyr Resende de Mendonça; Attendance: 1,757; Referee: Alexandre Vargas Tavares de Jesus

31 March 2024 Second leg	Botafogo	2–0 (6–0 agg.)	Boavista	Rio de Janeiro
19:30 UTC−3	Tchê Tchê 49' (pen.); Kauê 57'			Stadium: Estádio Nilton Santos; Attendance: 6,514; Referee: Yuri Elino Ferreira da Cruz

=== Copa do Brasil ===
==== Third round ====
3 May 2024 First leg	Botafogo	1–0	Vitória	Rio de Janeiro
19:00 UTC−3	Carlos Eduardo 65'			Stadium: Estádio Nilton Santos; Referee: Luiz Flávio

23 May 2024 Second leg	Vitória	1–2 (1–3 agg.)	Botafogo	Salvador
19:00 UTC−3	Daniel Júnior 78'		Luiz Henrique 45+2'; Júnior Santos 62'	Stadium: Barradão; Referee: Rodrigo José Pereira de Lima

==== Round of 16 ====
30 July 2024 First leg	Botafogo	1–1	Bahia	Rio de Janeiro
21:30 UTC−3	Carlos Alberto 8'		Cauly 45+1'; Everaldo (yellow card) 69'	Stadium: Estádio Nilton Santos; Attendance: 19,121; Referee: Flavio Rodrigues de Souza

7 August 2024 Second leg	Bahia	1–0 (2–1 agg.)	Botafogo	Salvador
19:00 UTC−3	Caio Alexandre (yellow card) 81'; Rodríguez 87', (yellow card) 88'; Ribeiro (yellow card) 90+3'; Rafael Ratão (yellow card) 90+5'		Almada (yellow card) 17'; Gregore (red card) 45+3'; Barboza (yellow card) 77'; Bastos (yellow card) 90+4'	Stadium: Arena Fonte Nova; Referee: Rafael Rodrigo Klein

=== Copa Libertadores ===
==== Second stage ====
21 February 2024 First leg	Aurora (Bolivia)	1–1	(Brazil) Botafogo	Cochabamba, Bolivia
20:30 UTC−4	Torrico 90+6'		Tiquinho Soares (penalty missed) 22'; Júnior Santos 27'	Stadium: Estadio Félix Capriles; Referee: Cristian Garay (Chile)

28 February 2024 Second leg	Botafogo (Brazil)	6–0 (7–1 agg.)	(Bolivia) Aurora	Rio de Janeiro
21:30 UTC−3	Júnior Santos 3', 52', 69', 81'; Tiquinho Soares 15'; Savarino 45+2'			Stadium: Estádio Nilton Santos; Attendance: 21,917; Referee: Jesús Valenzuela (Venezuela)

==== Third stage ====
6 March 2024 First leg	Botafogo (Brazil)	2–1	(Brazil) Red Bull Bragantino	Rio de Janeiro
21:30 UTC−3	Júnior Santos 44', 73'	Report	Juninho Capixaba 45+2'	Stadium: Estádio Nilton Santos; Attendance: 33,433; Referee: Gustavo Tejera (Uruguay)

13 March 2024 Second leg	Red Bull Bragantino (Brazil)	1–1 (3–2 agg.)	(Brazil) Botafogo	Bragança Paulista
21:30 UTC−3	Talisson 86'	Report	Júnior Santos 76'	Stadium: Estádio Nabi Abi Chedid; Attendance: 8,300; Referee: Wilmar Roldán (Colombia)

==== Group stage ====
The draw was held on 18 March 2024.

Group D

Pos	Team	Pld	W	D	L	GF	GA	GD	Pts	Qualification	JUN	BOT	LDQ	UNI
1	(Colombia) Junior	6	2	4	0	7	4	+3	10	Advance to round of 16	—	0–0	1–1	1–1
2	(Brazil) Botafogo	6	3	1	2	7	6	+1	10	Advance to round of 16	1–3	—	2–1	3–1
3	(Ecuador) LDU Quito	6	2	1	3	6	6	0	7	Transfer to Copa Sudamericana	0–1	1–0	—	2–0
4	(Peru) Universitario	6	1	2	3	5	9	−4	5		1–1	0–1	2–1	—

Source: CONMEBOL
Rules for classification: 1) Points; 2) Goal difference; 3) Goals scored; 4) Away goals scored; 5) CONMEBOL ranking.

3 April 2024 1	Botafogo (Brazil)	1–3	(Colombia) Junior	Rio de Janeiro
19:00 UTC−3	Hugo 43'	Report	Bacca 13' (pen.), 41'; Fuentes 28'	Stadium: Estádio Nilton Santos; Attendance: 39,039; Referee: Cristian Garay (Chile)

11 April 2024 2	LDU Quito (Ecuador)	1–0	(Brazil) Botafogo	Quito, Ecuador
17:00 UTC−5	Alzugaray 4'	Report		Stadium: Estadio Rodrigo Paz Delgado; Attendance: 16,008; Referee: Andrés Matonte (Uruguay)

24 April 2024 3	Botafogo (Brazil)	3–1	(Peru) Universitario	Rio de Janeiro
19:00 UTC−3	Carlos Eduardo 47', 90+2'; Luiz Henrique 57'	Report	Olivares 90+4'	Stadium: Estádio Nilton Santos; Attendance: 23,800; Referee: Jesús Valenzuela (Venezuela)

8 May 2024 4	Botafogo (Brazil)	2–1	(Ecuador) LDU Quito	Rio de Janeiro
21:30 UTC−3	Hugo 31'; Júnior Santos 69'	Report	Estrada 45+1'	Stadium: Estádio Nilton Santos; Attendance: 26,464; Referee: Darío Herrera (Argentina)

16 May 2024 5	Universitario (Peru)	0–1	(Brazil) Botafogo	Lima, Peru
21:00 UTC−5			Jeffinho 77'	Stadium: Estadio Monumental; Attendance: 53,242; Referee: Cristian Garay (Chile)

28 May 2024 6	Junior (Colombia)	0–0	(Brazil) Botafogo	Barranquilla, Colombia
17:00 UTC−5				Stadium: Estadio Metropolitano Roberto Meléndez; Attendance: 16,189; Referee: Jesús Valenzuela (Venezuela)

==== Final stages ====
===== Round of 16 =====
14 August 2024 First leg	Botafogo (Brazil)	2–1	(Brazil) Palmeiras	Rio de Janeiro
21:30 UTC−3	Luiz Henrique 22'; Igor Jesus 39', (yellow card) 49'; Cuiabano (yellow card) 64'; Tiquinho Soares (yellow card) 90'		López (yellow card) 29'; Maurício 33'; Veiga (yellow card) 37'; Estêvão Willian (yellow card) 90'	Stadium: Estádio Nilton Santos; Attendance: 38,848; Referee: Esteban Ostojich (Uruguay)

21 August 2024 Second leg	Palmeiras (Brazil)	2–2 (3–4 agg.)	(Brazil) Botafogo	São Paulo
21:30 UTC−3	Ríos (yellow card) 35'; López 86'; Rony 90'		Barboza (yellow card) 35'; Gregore (yellow card) 45+3'; Igor Jesus 56'; Savarino 64'; John (yellow card) 81'; Ponte (yellow card) 89'; Tchê Tchê (yellow card) 90+10'	Stadium: Allianz Parque; Attendance: 40,269; Referee: Facundo Tello (Argentina)

===== Quarter-finals =====
18 September 2024 First leg	Botafogo (Brazil)	0–0	(Brazil) São Paulo	Rio de Janeiro
21:30 UTC−3	Luiz Henrique (yellow card) 30'; Bastos (yellow card) 72'		Rafinha (yellow card) 82'; Arboleda (yellow card) 90+4'	Stadium: Estádio Nilton Santos; Attendance: 40,089; Referee: Esteban Ostojich (Uruguay)

25 September 2024 Second leg	São Paulo (Brazil)	1–1 (1–1 agg.) (4–5 p)	(Brazil) Botafogo	São Paulo
21:30 UTC−3	Moura (penalty missed) 45+5'; Bobadilla (yellow card) 53'; Nestor (yellow card) 79'; Calleri 87'; Rafinha (yellow card) 90+2' (yellow-red card) 90+2'; Igor Vinícius (yellow card) 90+7'		Almada 15'; Barboza (yellow card) 45+2'; John (yellow card) 49'; Fernández (red card) 90+2'; Marçal (yellow card) 90+2'	Stadium: Estádio do Morumbi; Attendance: 61,329; Referee: Darío Herrera (Argentina)
	Penalties
	Calleri (penalty missed); Luiz Gustavo (penalty scored); Moura (penalty scored); Igor Vinícius (penalty scored); Luciano (penalty scored); Nestor (penalty missed)		(penalty scored) Tchê Tchê; (penalty scored) Danilo; (penalty scored) Marçal; (penalty missed) Vitinho; (penalty scored) Almada; (penalty scored) Matheus Martins

===== Semi-finals =====
23 October 2024 First leg	Botafogo (Brazil)	5–0	(Uruguay) Peñarol	Rio de Janeiro
21:45 UTC−3	Luiz Henrique (yellow card) 13', (goal) 73'; Igor Jesus (yellow card) 36', (goal) 79'; Savarino 51', 59'; Barboza 55'; Gregore (yellow card) 61'		Pérez Casada (yellow card) 36'	Stadium: Estádio Nilton Santos; Attendance: 42,982; Referee: Andrés Rojas (Colombia)
Note: The start of the match was pushed back by 15 minutes because the Peñarol team arrived at the stadium late.

30 October 2024 Second leg	Peñarol (Uruguay)	3–1 (3–6 agg.)	(Brazil) Botafogo	Montevideo, Uruguay
21:30 UTC−3	Báez 31', 66'; Aguerre (red card) 45+5'; Sosa (yellow card) 86'; Batista 89'		Bastos (yellow card) 28'; Matheus Martins (yellow card) 45+4'; Vitinho (yellow card) 49'; Ponte (yellow card) 69' (yellow-red card) 69'; Almada (yellow card) 71', (goal) 88'	Stadium: Estadio Centenario; Attendance: 33,034; Referee: Piero Maza (Chile)
Note: The match was moved from the Estadio Campeón del Siglo due to safety concerns.

===== Final =====
30 November 2024 Final	Atlético Mineiro (Brazil)	1–3	(Brazil) Botafogo	Buenos Aires, Argentina
17:00 UTC−3	Battaglia (yellow card) 30'; Lyanco (yellow card) 45+1'; Vera (yellow card) 45+2'; Vargas 47'; Hulk (yellow card) 90+2'		Gregore (red card) 2'; Luiz Henrique 35'; Telles 44' (pen.), (yellow card) 45+3'; Almada (yellow card) 79'; Vitinho (yellow card) 90+4'; Júnior Santos 90+7', (yellow card) 90+9'	Stadium: Estadio Monumental; Attendance: 69,803; Referee: Facundo Tello (Argentina)

=== FIFA Intercontinental Cup ===
==== Second round ====
FIFA Derby of the Americas

11 December 2024 Second round	Botafogo (Brazil)	0–3	(Mexico) Pachuca	Doha, Qatar
20:00 UTC+3		Report	Idrissi 50'; Deossa 66'; Rondón 80'	Stadium: Stadium 974; Attendance: 12,257; Referee: Danny Makkelie (Netherlands)

== Statistics ==
=== Goalscorers ===
As of 8 December 2024

Position	Players	Série A	Campeonato Carioca	Copa do Brasil	Copa Libertadores	Total
FW	(Brazil) Júnior Santos	4	5	1	10	20
MF	(Venezuela) Jefferson Savarino	8	2	0	4	14
FW	(Brazil) Luiz Henrique	7	0	1	4	12
MF	(Brazil) Tiquinho Soares	5	3	0	1	9
MF	(Brazil) Carlos Eduardo	2	3	1	2	8
FW	(Brazil) Igor Jesus	5	0	0	3	8
FW	(Brazil) Jeffinho	1	3	0	1	5
DF	(Angola) Bastos	3	1	0	0	4
DF	(Brazil) Cuiabano	4	0	0	0	4
MF	(Argentina) Thiago Almada	1	0	0	2	3
MF	(Brazil) Danilo Barbosa	3	0	0	0	3
MF	(Brazil) Gregore	3	0	0	0	3
DF	(Uruguay) Mateo Ponte	3	0	0	0	3
MF	(Brazil) Carlos Alberto	1	0	1	0	2
DF	(Brazil) Hugo	0	0	0	2	2
MF	(Brazil) Kauê	1	1	0	0	2
MF	(Brazil) Marlon Freitas	0	2	0	0	2
MF	(Brazil) Matheus Martins	2	0	0	0	2
DF	(Brazil) Lucas Halter	1	1	0	0	2
FW	(Brazil) Yarlen	0	2	0	0	2
DF	(Brazil) Adryelson	1	0	0	0	1
DF	(Argentina) Alexander Barboza	0	0	0	1	1
FW	(Brazil) Emerson Urso	0	1	0	0	1
FW	(Uruguay) Diego Hernández	0	1	0	0	1
FW	(Brazil) Janderson	0	1	0	0	1
DF	(Brazil) Fernando Marçal	0	1	0	0	1
MF	(Nicaragua) Jacob Montes	1	0	0	0	1
MF	(Brazil) Raí	0	1	0	0	1
FW	(Paraguay) Óscar Romero	1	0	0	0	1
FW	(Brazil) Sapata	0	1	0	0	1
DF	(Brazil) Alex Telles	0	0	0	1	1
MF	(Brazil) Tchê Tchê	0	1	0	0	1
