= Yarlen =

Brazilian footballer

Personal information
- Full name: Yarlen Faustino Augusto
- Date of birth: 20 February 2006 (age 20)
- Place of birth: Rio de Janeiro, Brazil
- Height: 1.78 m (5 ft 10 in)
- Position: Winger

Team information
- Current team: Athletic (on loan from Botafogo)

Youth career
- Olaria
- 2021–2023: Botafogo

Senior career*
Years	Team	Apps	(Gls)
2024–	Botafogo	16	(2)
2025–2026	→ Tondela (loan)	11	(0)
2026	→ América Mineiro (loan)	6	(1)
2026–	→ Athletic (loan)	7	(0)
- * Club domestic league appearances and goals as of 18 November 2026

Yarlen Faustino Augusto (born 20 February 2006), simply known as Yarlen, is a Brazilian professional footballer who plays as a winger for Campeonato Brasileiro Série B club Athletic, on loan from Botafogo.

== Career ==
Born in Rio de Janeiro, Yarlen joined Botafogo's youth setup in 2021, from Olaria. He made his first team debut on 3 March 2024, coming on as a late substitute for Kauê in a 4–2 Campeonato Carioca away win over Fluminense; by doing so, he became the first player born in 2006 to appear for the club in an official match.

Yarlen scored his first senior goal on 10 March 2024, netting the opener in a 2–1 away win over Sampaio Corrêa-RJ. On 7 May, he renewed his contract with Fogão until December 2028.

Yarlen made his Série A debut on 1 June 2024, replacing Júnior Santos late into a 1–0 away win over Corinthians.

On 28 July 2025, Yarlen was sent on loan to Primeira Liga club Tondela, with an option to buy. After scoring 1 goal in 14 appearances for the Portuguese club, he returned to Brazil, joining Série B side América Mineiro on loan until the end of the 2026 season.

== Career statistics ==
As of 17 June 2024

Club	Season	League			State league		Cup		Continental		Other		Total	
Club	Season	Division	Apps	Goals	Apps	Goals	Apps	Goals	Apps	Goals	Apps	Goals	Apps	Goals
Botafogo	2024	Série A	3	0	3	2	0	0	2 (Note: Appearance(s) in Copa Libertadores)	0	—		8	2
Career total			3	0	3	2	0	0	2	0	0	0	8	2

== Honours ==
Botafogo

- Copa Libertadores : 2024
- Campeonato Brasileiro Série A: 2024
