= 2022 Botafogo FR season =

Botafogo
2022 season
- Manager: Luís Castro (from 29 March)
- Stadium: Estádio Nilton Santos
- Série A: 11th
- Campeonato Carioca: Semi-finals
- Copa do Brasil: Round of 16
Home colours	Away colours	Third colours

The 2022 season was Botafogo's 118th in existence and the first one back in the top flight. They were playing in the Série A and the Campeonato Carioca.

== Squad ==
Note: Flags indicate national team as defined under FIFA eligibility rules; some limited exceptions apply. Players may hold more than one non-FIFA nationality.

No.	Pos.	Nation	Player
1	GK	PAR	Gatito Fernández (vice-captain)
2	DF	ARG	Renzo Saravia
3	DF	ARG	Joel Carli (captain)
4	DF	BRA	Kanu
5	MF	BRA	Danilo
6	MF	BRA	Tchê Tchê
7	DF	BRA	Rafael
8	MF	BRA	Patrick de Paula
9	FW	BRA	Tiquinho
10	FW	BRA	Gustavo Sauer
11	FW	BRA	Diego Gonçalves (on loan from Mirassol)
12	GK	BRA	Lucas Perri
14	MF	BRA	Gabriel (on loan from Benfica)
15	DF	ARG	Víctor Cuesta (on loan from Internacional)
16	DF	BRA	Hugo
18	MF	BRA	Lucas Fernandes (on loan from Portimonense)
20	DF	BRA	Daniel Borges

No.	Pos.	Nation	Player
21	DF	BRA	Marçal
22	GK	BRA	Douglas Borges
23	MF	BRA	Romildo Del Piage
29	FW	BRA	Victor Sá
30	DF	BRA	Carlinhos
32	MF	USA	Jacob Montes
33	MF	BRA	Carlos Eduardo
34	DF	BRA	Diego Loureiro
37	FW	BRA	Júnior Santos (on loan from Sanfrecce Hiroshima)
40	DF	BRA	Lucas Mezenga
43	MF	BRA	Lucas Piazon (on loan from Braga)
47	MF	BRA	Jeffinho
52	GK	BRA	Igo Gabriel (on loan from CSA)
62	MF	BRA	Kayque (on loan from Nova Iguaçu)
90	FW	BRA	Matheus Nascimento
94	DF	BRA	Philipe Sampaio
99	FW	BRA	Luis Henrique (on loan from Marseille)

== Transfers ==
=== In ===
Pos.	Player	Transferred from	Fee	Date	Source
MF	(Brazil) Jeffinho	(Brazil) Resende	Loan	13 April 2022	
MF	(Brazil) Tiquinho Soares	(Greece) Olympiacos	€1,000,000	12 August 2022	
MF	(Brazil) Danilo Barbosa	(France) Nice	Undisclosed	12 August 2022	
MF	(Brazil) Jeffinho	(Brazil) Resende	€300,000	26 August 2022	

=== Out ===
Pos.	Player	Transferred to	Fee	Date	Source
MF	(Brazil) Jeffinho	(Brazil) Resende	Loan return	25 August 2022	

== Competitions ==
=== Overall record ===
Competition	First match	Last match	Starting round	Final position	Record							
Competition	First match	Last match	Starting round	Final position	Pld	W	D	L	GF	GA	GD	Win %
Série A	10 April 2022	13 November 2022	Matchday 1	11th	38	15	8	15	41	43	−2	39.47
Campeonato Carioca	25 January 2022	27 March 2022	Taça Guanabara	Semi-finals	13	7	2	4	26	18	+8	53.85
Copa do Brasil	20 April 2022	14 July 2022	Third round	Round of 16	4	2	0	2	6	5	+1	50.00
Total					55	24	10	21	73	66	+7	43.64

Source: Competitions

=== Série A ===
==== League table ====
Pos	Team	Pld	W	D	L	GF	GA	GD	Pts	Qualification or relegation
9	São Paulo	38	13	15	10	55	42	+13	54	Qualification for Copa Sudamericana group stage
10	América Mineiro	38	15	8	15	40	40	0	53	Qualification for Copa Sudamericana group stage
11	Botafogo	38	15	8	15	41	43	−2	53	Qualification for Copa Sudamericana group stage
12	Santos	38	12	11	15	44	41	+3	47	Qualification for Copa Sudamericana group stage
13	Goiás	38	11	13	14	40	53	−13	46	Qualification for Copa Sudamericana group stage

Source: CBF
Rules for classification: 1) points; 2) wins; 3) goal difference; 4) goals scored; 5) head-to-head results (only between two teams); 6) fewest red cards; 7) fewest yellow cards; 8) drawing of lots.

==== Results summary ====
Overall								Home						Away					
Pld	W	D	L	GF	GA	GD	Pts	W	D	L	GF	GA	GD	W	D	L	GF	GA	GD
38	15	8	15	41	43	−2	53	6	4	9	18	19	−1	9	4	6	23	24	−1

==== Results by round ====
Round	1	2	3	4	5	6	7	8	9	10	11	12	13	14	15	16
Ground	H	A	A	H	A	H	A	A	H	A	H	H	A	H	A	A
Result	L	W	D	D	W	W	D	L	L	L	L	W	W	L	W	L
Position	17	10	13	14	7	3	4	6	10	15	17	14	7	10	9	10

A = Away; H = Home; W = Win; D = Draw; L = Loss

==== Matches ====
The first round dates was announced on 30 March 2022.

10 April 2022 1	Botafogo	1–3	Corinthians	Rio de Janeiro
16:00 UTC−3				Stadium: Estádio Nilton Santos

17 April 2022 2	Ceará	1–3	Botafogo	Fortaleza
19:00 UTC−3				Stadium: Castelão

24 April 2022 3	Atlético Goianiense	1–1	Botafogo	Goiânia
18:30 UTC−3				Stadium: Estádio Antônio Accioly

1 May 2022 4	Botafogo	1–1	Juventude	Rio de Janeiro
16:00 UTC−3				Stadium: Estádio Nilton Santos

8 May 2022 5	Flamengo	0–1	Botafogo	Rio de Janeiro
11:00 UTC−3				Stadium: Maracanã Stadium

15 May 2022 6	Botafogo	3–1	Fortaleza	Rio de Janeiro
18:00 UTC−3				Stadium: Estádio Nilton Santos

22 May 2022 7	América Mineiro	1–1	Botafogo	Belo Horizonte
				Stadium: Mineirão

29 May 2022 8	Coritiba	1–0	Botafogo	Curitiba
				Stadium: Estádio Couto Pereira

7 June 2022 9	Botafogo	1–2	Goiás	Rio de Janeiro
16:00 UTC−3				Stadium: Estádio Nilton Santos

10 June 2022 10	Palmeiras	4–0	Botafogo	São Paulo

13 June 2022 11	Botafogo	0–1	Avaí	Rio de Janeiro
16:00 UTC−3				Stadium: Estádio Nilton Santos

16 June 2022 12	Botafogo	1–0	São Paulo	Rio de Janeiro
16:00 UTC−3				Stadium: Estádio Nilton Santos

19 June 2022 13	Internacional	2–3	Botafogo	Porto Alegre
				Stadium: Estádio Beira-Rio

26 June 2022 14	Botafogo	0–1	Fluminense	Rio de Janeiro
16:00 UTC−3				Stadium: Estádio Nilton Santos

5 July 2022 15	Red Bull Bragantino	0–1	Botafogo	Bragança Paulista
				Stadium: Estádio Nabi Abi Chedid

11 July 2022 16	Cuiabá	2–0	Botafogo	Cuiabá
				Stadium: Arena Pantanal

17 July 2022 17	Botafogo	0–1	Atlético Mineiro	Rio de Janeiro
16:00 UTC−3				Stadium: Estádio Nilton Santos

21 July 2022 18	Santos	2–0	Botafogo	Santos
				Stadium: Vila Belmiro

24 July 2022 19	Botafogo	2–0	Athletico Paranaense	Rio de Janeiro
16:00 UTC−3				Stadium: Estádio Nilton Santos

31 July 2022 20	Corinthians	1–0	Botafogo	São Paulo
				Stadium: Neo Quimica Arena

6 August 2022 21	Botafogo	1–1	Ceará	Rio de Janeiro
16:00 UTC−3				Stadium: Estádio Nilton Santos

14 August 2022 22	Botafogo	0–0	Atlético Goianiense	Rio de Janeiro
16:00 UTC−3				Stadium: Estádio Nilton Santos

21 August 2022 23	Juventude	2–2	Botafogo	Caxias do Sul
				Stadium: Estádio Alfredo Jaconi

28 August 2022 24	Botafogo	0–1	Flamengo	Rio de Janeiro
16:00 UTC−3				Stadium: Estádio Nilton Santos

4 September 2022 25	Fortaleza	1–3	Botafogo	Fortaleza
				Stadium: Castelão

11 September 2022 26	Botafogo	0–0	América Mineiro	Rio de Janeiro
16:00 UTC−3				Stadium: Estádio Nilton Santos

18 September 2022 27	Botafogo	2–0	Coritiba	Rio de Janeiro
16:00 UTC−3				Stadium: Estádio Nilton Santos

29 September 2022 28	Goiás	0–1	Botafogo
11:00 UTC−3

4 October 2022 29	Botafogo	1–3	Palmeiras	Rio de Janeiro
16:00 UTC−3				Stadium: Estádio Nilton Santos

7 October 2022 30	Avaí	1–2	Botafogo
11:00 UTC−3

10 October 2022 31	São Paulo	0–1	Botafogo
11:00 UTC−3

16 October 2022 32	Botafogo	0–1	Internacional	Rio de Janeiro
16:00 UTC−3				Stadium: Estádio Nilton Santos

23 October 2022 33	Fluminense	2–2	Botafogo	Rio de Janeiro
11:00 UTC−3

26 October 2022 34	Botafogo	2–1	Red Bull Bragantino	Rio de Janeiro
16:00 UTC−3	Gabriel Pires 18'; Danilo Neves 71'		Luan Cândido 62'	Stadium: Estádio Nilton Santos; Attendance: 11,093; Referee: Dyorgines José Padovani de Andrade

1 November 2022 35	Botafogo	0–2	Cuiabá	Rio de Janeiro
19:00 UTC−3			André Luis 41'; Deyverson 52'	Stadium: Estádio Nilton Santos; Attendance: 16,365; Referee: Jean Pierre Gonçalves Lima

7 November 2022 36	Atlético Mineiro	0–2	Botafogo	Belo Horizonte
20:00 UTC−3			Victor Sá 76'; Tiquinho Soares 84'	Stadium: Mineirão; Attendance: 31,160; Referee: Leandro Vuaden

10 November 2022 37	Botafogo	3–0	Santos	Rio de Janeiro
20:00 UTC−3	Lucas Fernandes 10', 53'; Tiquinho Soares 70'		Eduardo (red card) 90+3'	Stadium: Estádio Nilton Santos; Attendance: 28,130; Referee: Bráulio da Silva Machado

13 November 2022 38	Athletico Paranaense	3–0	Botafogo	Curitiba
16:00 UTC−3	Adryelson 52' (o.g.); Vitor Roque 62'; Erick 90+4'			Stadium: Arena da Baixada; Attendance: 19,336; Referee: Anderson Daronco

=== Campeonato Carioca ===
26 January 2022 1	Boavista	1–1	Botafogo

30 January 2022 2	Botafogo	2–0	Bangu

3 February 2022 3	Botafogo	4–2	Madureira

8 February 2022 4	Botafogo	2–0	Nova Iguaçu

11 February 2022 5	Fluminense	2–1	Botafogo

14 February 2022 6	Vasco da Gama	0–1	Botafogo

17 February 2022 7	Botafogo	2–1	Resende

24 February 2022 8	Botafogo	1–3	Flamengo

27 February 2022 9	Portuguesa	5–3	Botafogo

7 March 2022 10	Botafogo	5–0	Volta Redonda

13 March 2022 11	Audax Rio	2–2	Botafogo

==== Semi-finals ====
22 March 2022 First leg	Botafogo	0–1	Fluminense	Rio de Janeiro
				Stadium: Estádio Nilton Santos; Referee: Grazianni Maciel Rocha

27 March 2022 Second leg	Fluminense	1–2	Botafogo	Rio de Janeiro
				Stadium: Maracanã; Referee: Paulo Moreira

=== Copa do Brasil ===
==== Third round ====
20 April 2022 First leg	Ceilândia	0–3	Botafogo	Brasília
21:30 UTC−3		Report		Stadium: Estádio Nacional Mané Garrincha; Attendance: 28,110; Referee: Bráulio da Silva Machado

12 May 2022 Second leg	Botafogo	3–0 (6–0 agg.)	Ceilândia	Rio de Janeiro
21:30 UTC−3				Stadium: Estádio Nilton Santos; Attendance: 18,648; Referee: Ricardo Marques Ribeiro

==== Round of 16 ====
30 June 2022 First leg	América Mineiro	3–0	Botafogo	Belo Horizonte
19:00 UTC−3		Report		Stadium: Arena Independência; Attendance: 3,861; Referee: Jean Pierre Gonçalves Lima

14 July 2022 Second leg	Botafogo	0–2 (0–5 agg.)	América Mineiro	Rio de Janeiro
21:00 UTC−3		Report		Stadium: Estádio Nilton Santos; Attendance: 13,862; Referee: Bráulio da Silva Machado
