= Júnior Santos =

Júnior Santos may refer to:

- Junior dos Santos (born 1984), Brazilian mixed martial artist
- Júnior Santos (footballer, born 1985), Natanael de Sousa Santos Júnior, Brazilian football attacking midfielder
- Júnior Santos (footballer, born 1994), José Antonio dos Santos Júnior, Brazilian football forward
