= Kayque =

Brazilian footballer (born 2000)

Personal information
- Full name: Kayque Luiz Pereira
- Date of birth: 12 July 2000 (age 26)
- Place of birth: Rio de Janeiro, Brazil
- Height: 1.76 m (5 ft 9 in)
- Position: Midfielder

Youth career
- 2011–2020: Nova Iguaçu
- 2020–2021: → Botafogo (loan)

Senior career*
Years	Team	Apps	(Gls)
2020–2022	Nova Iguaçu	6	(0)
2020–2022	→ Botafogo (loan)	12	(0)
2022–2024	Botafogo	18	(1)
2023–2024	→ RWD Molenbeek (loan)	0	(0)
2024	→ Guarani (loan)	5	(0)
2024–2025	Spartak Subotica	28	(0)
2025	Baniyas	2	(0)
- * Club domestic league appearances and goals as of 15 June 2025

Kayque Luiz Pereira (born 12 July 2000), simply known as Kayque, is a Brazilian professional footballer who plays as a midfielder.

== Club career ==
=== Nova Iguaçu ===
Kayque was born in Rio de Janeiro, and began his career with Nova Iguaçu at the age of eleven. He made his first team debut with the club on 11 January 2020, coming on as a second-half substitute in a 4–0 Campeonato Carioca home routing over America-RJ.

=== Botafogo ===
On 5 September 2020, after five more first team appearances for Nova Iguaçu, Kayque joined Botafogo on loan until the following February, and was initially assigned to the under-20 squad. He made his first team – and Série A – debut for Bota on 2 February 2021, replacing Cesinha in a 1–1 away draw against Palmeiras.

Kayque had his loan extended until the end of 2021, but suffered a thigh injury which kept him sidelined between the months of April and July. On 14 January 2022, his loan was again extended for another six months.

On 29 June 2022, Botafogo announced a permanent deal with Kayque until 2025.

==== RWD Molenbeek (loan) ====
On 6 September 2023, Botafogo sent Kayque on a season-long loan to recently-promoted to Belgian Pro League club RWD Molenbeek.

== Career statistics ==
As of 21 March 2024

Club	Season	League			State league		Cup		Continental		Total	
Club	Season	Division	Apps	Goals	Apps	Goals	Apps	Goals	Apps	Goals	Apps	Goals
Nova Iguaçu	2019	—			6 (Note: Appearance(s) in Campeonato Carioca)	0	—		—		6	0
Botafogo (loan)	2020	Série A	5	0	—		0	0	—		5	0
Botafogo (loan)	2021	Série B	2	0	5	0	0	0	—		7	0
Botafogo	2022	Série A	6	1	9	0	2	0	—		17	1
Botafogo	2023	Série A	2	0	0	0	0	0	0	0	2	0
Botafogo	2024	Série A	0	0	1	0	0	0	0	0	2	0
Botafogo	Total		15	1	15	0	2	0	0	0	32	1
RWDM (loan)	2023–24	Belgian Pro League	0	0	—		0	0	—		0	0
Guarani (loan)	2024	Série B	0	0	—		—		—		0	0
Career total			15	1	21	0	2	0	0	0	38	1

== Honours ==
Botafogo

- Campeonato Brasileiro Série B: 2021
