= Gregore =

Brazilian footballer (born 1994)

Personal information
- Full name: Gregore de Magalhães Silva Favero
- Date of birth: 2 March 1994 (age 32)
- Place of birth: Juiz de Fora, Brazil
- Height: 1.81 m (5 ft 11 in)
- Position: Defensive midfielder

Team information
- Current team: Al-Rayyan
- Number: 40

Youth career
- Sport Juiz de Fora
- Tupi
- Tupynambás
- Joseense

Senior career*
Years	Team	Apps	(Gls)
2012–2015	São José dos Campos	43	(1)
2015–2018	São Carlos	23	(5)
2016–2017	→ Santos (loan)	0	(0)
2018	→ Bahia (loan)	16	(0)
2018–2021	Bahia	110	(0)
2021–2024	Inter Miami	65	(0)
2024–2025	Botafogo	45	(3)
2025–	Al-Rayyan	0	(0)
- * Club domestic league appearances and goals as of 02:43, 9 December 2024 (UTC)

Gregore de Magalhães Silva Favero (born 2 March 1994), simply known as Gregore, is a Brazilian professional footballer who plays as a defensive midfielder for Al-Rayyan.

== Club career ==
=== Early career ===
Born in Juiz de Fora, Minas Gerais, Gregore was a Joseense youth graduate. He made his senior debut for the club on 14 March 2013, starting in a 1–0 home win against Batatais for the Campeonato Paulista Série A3 championship, and remained at the club when it changed its name to São José dos Campos FC.

In May 2015 Gregore moved to São Carlos. He was an undisputed starter for the side, who achieved promotion from Campeonato Paulista Segunda Divisão as champions.

=== Santos ===
On 17 December 2015 Gregore was loaned to Santos, initially assigned to the B-team. On 11 May 2016 he made his professional debut, coming on as a second-half substitute for Fernando Medeiros in a 3–0 away win against Galvez, for the year's Copa do Brasil.

=== Bahia ===
On 11 January 2018, Gregore was loaned to fellow Série A team Bahia, for one year. He made his top tier debut on 15 April, starting in a 2–0 away loss against Internacional.

On 25 May 2018, Gregore renewed his contract until 2021 after having 50% of his economic rights bought by Bahia. He ended the campaign as an undisputed starter, featuring in 35 matches. He also led the campaign in tackling, making him one of the best defensive midfielders of the season.

During the 2019 season, Gregore kept his great performances, leading the campaign in tackling once more. On 20 August, Bahia bought more 40% of Gregore's economic rights, in order to own 90% in total, with his contract expiring at the final of the 2021 season.

=== Inter Miami ===
On 24 February 2021, Gregore joined Major League Soccer club Inter Miami. In November, he was named as the Inter Miami most valuable player of the 2021 season. He also led the number of tackles (55) among all teams of the MLS Regular Season.

On 11 March 2023 in a game against New York City FC, Gregore suffered a Lisfranc injury and was ruled out for six months. Four days later on the 15th, he underwent surgery to repair his foot. On 16 October 2023, Gregore signed a 2-year extension with Inter Miami.

=== Botafogo ===
On 19 February 2024, Inter Miami CF announced that it had transferred midfielder Gregore to Brazilian Serie A side Botafogo.

On 30 November, Gregore was sent off two minutes into the 2024 Copa Libertadores final.

His strong performances for Botafogo put Gregore on the Brazilian national team's radar. In an interview with Charla Podcast in July 2025, Rodrigo Caetano, director of national teams for the CBF, admitted that the midfielder was being monitored to join the group led by Italian coach Carlo Ancelotti.

In July 2025, Gregore finally received an official proposal from Al-Rayyan, from Qatar, then led by coach Artur Jorge — multi-champion with Botafogo in 2024.

=== Al-Rayyan ===
On 20 July 2025, Gregore signed with Qatar Stars League side Al-Rayyan.

== Career statistics ==
As of 8 December 2024

Club	Season	League			State league (Note: Includes Campeonato Paulista, Campeonato Baiano, Campeonato Carioca)		National cup (Note: Includes Copa do Brasil, U.S. Open Cup)		Continental		Other		Total	
Club	Season	Division	Apps	Goals	Apps	Goals	Apps	Goals	Apps	Goals	Apps	Goals	Apps	Goals
São José dos Campos	2013	Paulista A3	—		8	0	—		—		6 (Note: Appearances in Copa Paulista)	0	14	0
São José dos Campos	2014	Paulista A3	—		19	1	—		—		—		19	1
São José dos Campos	2015	Paulista A3	—		16	0	—		—		—		16	0
São José dos Campos	Total		—		43	1	—		—		6	0	49	1
São Carlos	2015	Paulista 2ª Divisão	—		23	5	—		—		—		23	5
Santos	2016	Série A	0	0	—		1	0	—		5	0	6	0
Santos	2017	Série A	0	0	—		0	0	—		18	0	18	0
Santos	Total		0	0	—		1	0	—		23	0	24	0
Bahia	2018	Série A	35	0	10	0	4	0	5 (Note: Appearances in Copa Sudamericana)	0	9 (Note: Appearances in Copa do Nordeste)	0	63	0
Bahia	2019	Série A	34	0	3	0	8	0	2	0	4	0	51	0
Bahia	2020	Série A	33	0	2	0	1	0	7	2	10	0	53	2
Bahia	Total		111	0	15	0	13	0	14	2	23	0	167	2
Inter Miami	2021	MLS	29	0	—		—		—		—		29	0
Inter Miami	2022	MLS	31	0	—		2	0	—		—		31	0
Inter Miami	2023	MLS	5	0	—		—		—		—		5	0
Inter Miami	Total		65	0	—		2	0	—		—		67	0
Botafogo	2024	Série A	33	3	3	0	4	0	15 (Note: Appearances in Copa Libertadores)	0	—		55	3
Career total			209	3	86	6	18	0	29	2	52	0	357	11

== Honours ==
São Carlos

- Campeonato Paulista Segunda Divisão: 2015

Bahia

- Campeonato Baiano: 2018, 2019, 2020

Botafogo

- Série A: 2024
- Copa Libertadores: 2024
- Taça Rio: 2024
