= John Victor (Brazilian footballer) =

Brazilian footballer (born 1996)

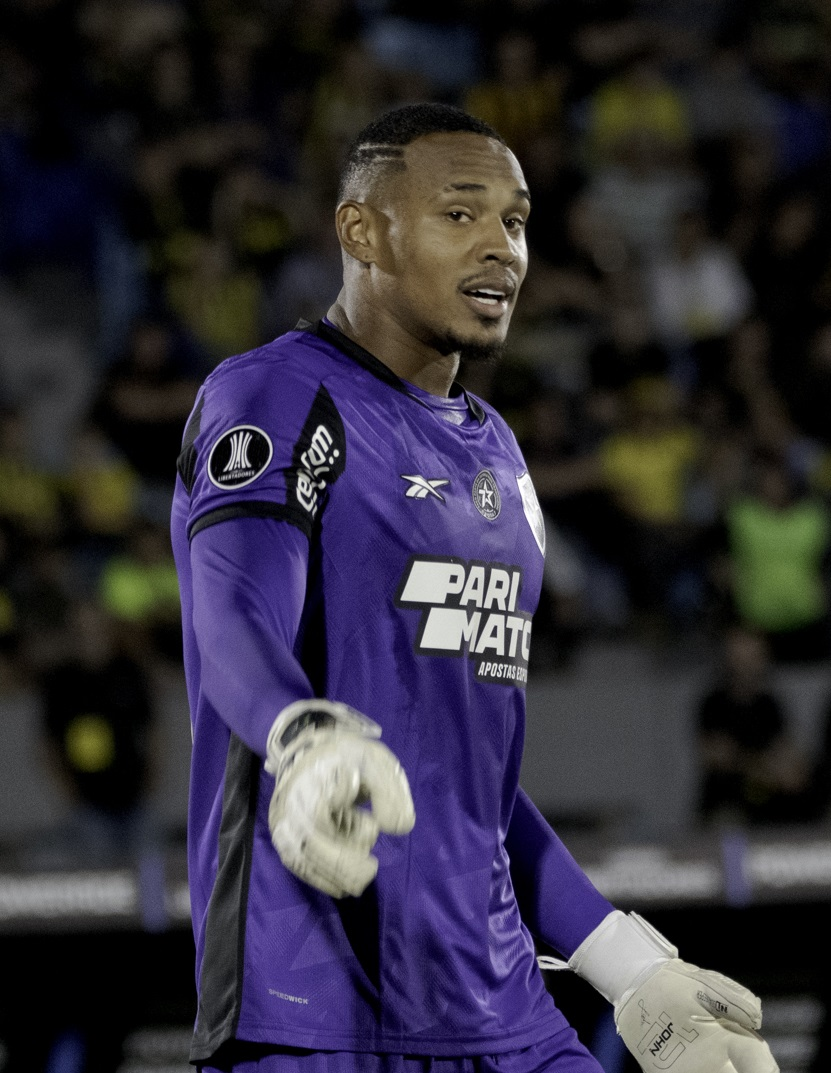
- John playing for Botafogo in 2024

Personal information
- Full name: John Victor Maciel Furtado
- Date of birth: 13 February 1996 (age 30)
- Place of birth: Diadema, São Paulo, Brazil
- Height: 1.97 m (6 ft 6 in)
- Position: Goalkeeper

Team information
- Current team: Nottingham Forest
- Number: 12

Youth career
- 2007–2011: São Paulo
- 2011–2016: Santos

Senior career*
Years	Team	Apps	(Gls)
2016–2024	Santos	19	(0)
2019	→ Portuguesa Santista (loan)	17	(0)
2023	→ Internacional (loan)	10	(0)
2023	→ Valladolid (loan)	11	(0)
2024–2025	Botafogo	57	(0)
2025–	Nottingham Forest	5	(0)

International career
2013	Brazil U17	1	(0)
- * Club domestic league appearances and goals as of 3 January 2026

John Victor Maciel Furtado (born 13 February 1996), known as John Victor or simply John (Brazilian Portuguese: [ˈdʒõw̃]), is a Brazilian professional footballer who plays as a goalkeeper for Premier League club Nottingham Forest.

== Club career ==
=== Santos ===
==== Beginnings ====
Born in Diadema, São Paulo, John joined Santos' youth setup in February 2011 at the age of 15, after starting out at São Paulo. In 2015, with the departure of Aranha, he was called up to train with the first team in some occasions.

On 20 January 2016, John renewed his contract with the Peixe until 2021, being definitely promoted to the main squad as a third choice behind Vanderlei and Vladimir. He made his unofficial first team debut on 8 October, playing 25 minutes in a 1–1 friendly draw against Benfica.

==== Loan to Portuguesa Santista ====
On 11 December 2018, John was loaned to Portuguesa Santista for the 2019 season. He was an undisputed starter during the 2019 Campeonato Paulista Série A2, before returning to his parent club.

==== Breakthrough ====
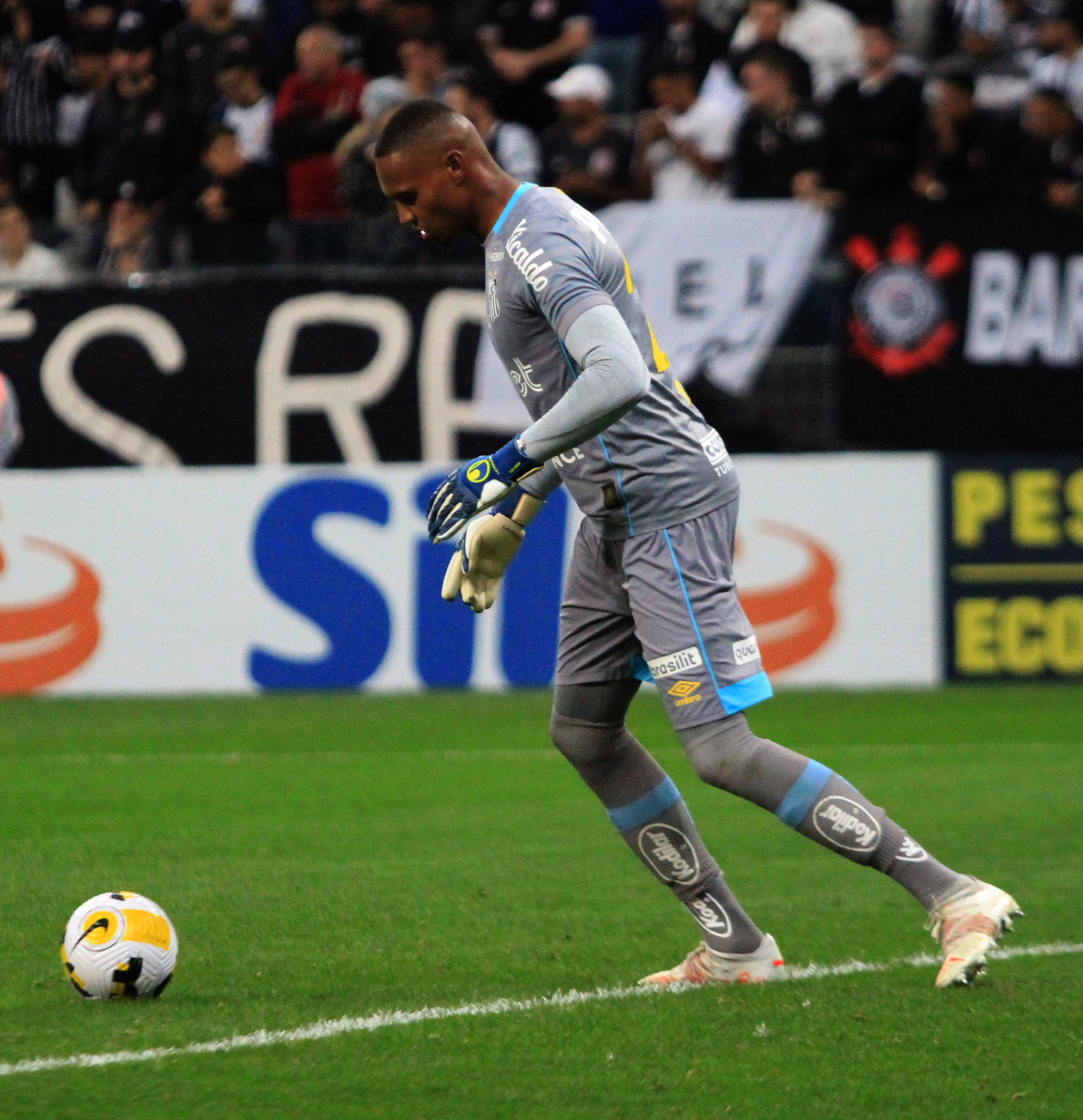
John Victor playing for Santos in 2022

On 13 December 2019, John further extended his contract with Santos until December 2023. Initially a fourth-choice behind Everson, Vladimir and João Paulo at the start of the 2020 campaign, he became a second-choice after Everson left and Vladimir was sidelined due to an injury.

John made his official – and Série A – debut for Santos on 14 November 2020, starting and keeping a clean sheet in a 2–0 home win against Internacional. He made his Copa Libertadores debut ten days later, playing the full 90 minutes and making several key stops in a 2–1 away success over LDU Quito.

On 8 January 2021, John and teammate Wagner Leonardo tested positive for COVID-19. Upon returning, he was chosen as the starter in the 2020 Copa Libertadores final, and shared the starting spot with João Paulo during the following months of the year before suffering a knee injury in August.

After being fully recovered, John spent the 2022 campaign as a backup to undisputed starter João Paulo, playing in just two matches during the year.

==== Loan to Internacional ====
On 18 January 2023, Santos announced the loan of John to fellow top tier club Internacional until the end of the year; he also renewed his contract with his parent club until the end of 2025.

==== Loan to Valladolid ====
On 20 August 2023, John was officially announced by Real Valladolid in the Spanish Segunda División, on loan for one year with a buyout clause. An initial backup to Jordi Masip, he was a starter between the months of September and October before returning to the bench.

=== Botafogo ===
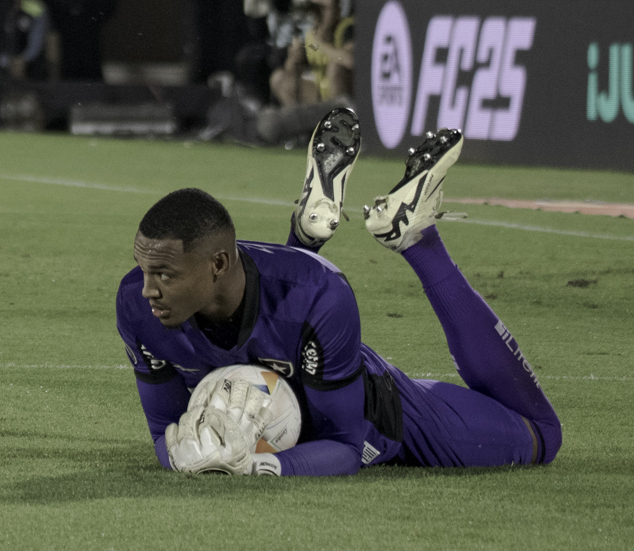
John playing for Botafogo in 2024

On 4 January 2024, Santos announced the transfer of John to Botafogo, with the player signing a four-year deal for a rumoured fee of € 1.5 million for 85% of his federative rights. At the presentation press conference, the goalkeeper rejected comparisons with Lucas Perri, Botafogo's goalkeeper in 2023.

In February, John suffered a muscle injury in the match against Nova Iguaçu, in the Campeonato Carioca, and was replaced by Gatito Fernández. The goalkeeper had already missed the start of Glorioso's campaign in the Campeonato Carioca due to a muscle injury. John has a recent history of this type of injury in his career.

Recovered from the muscle problem that took him out of time for around two months, John was reported in Botafogo's debut in the Libertadores group stage, in the match against Junior Barranquilla, 3 April 2024, at the Nilton Santos Stadium.

=== Nottingham Forest ===
In August 2025, days after failing to complete his transfer to West Ham United, Botafogo agreed to sell him to Nottingham Forest, where John would meet his former club teammates, Jair Cunha and Igor Jesus. He made his club debut on 17 September, in an EFL Cup match against Swansea City, which ended in a 3–2 loss. He made his league debut on 14 December in a 3–0 win over Tottenham Hotspur replacing the injured Matz Sels.

== Career statistics ==
As of match played 3 January 2026

Appearances and goals by club, season and competition
Club	Season	League			State league (Note: Includes Campeonato Paulista, Campeonato Gaúcho, Campeonato Carioca)		National cup (Note: Includes Copa do Brasil, Copa del Rey)		League cup (Note: Includes EFL Cup)		Continental		Other		Total	
Club	Season	Division	Apps	Goals	Apps	Goals	Apps	Goals	Apps	Goals	Apps	Goals	Apps	Goals	Apps	Goals
Santos	2020	Série A	9	0	0	0	0	0	—		6 (Note: Appearances in Copa Libertadores)	0	—		15	0
Santos	2021	Série A	4	0	5	0	2	0	—		0	0	—		11	0
Santos	2022	Série A	1	0	0	0	0	0	—		1 (Note: Appearance in Copa Sudamericana)	0	—		2	0
Santos	Total		14	0	5	0	2	0	—		7	0	—		28	0
Portuguesa Santista (loan)	2019	Paulista A2	—		17	0	—		—		—		—		17	0
Internacional (loan)	2023	Série A	9	0	1	0	1	0	—		3	0	—		14	0
Valladolid (loan)	2023–24	Segunda División	11	0	—		1	0	—		—		—		12	0
Botafogo	2024	Série A	34	0	2	0	4	0	—		10	0	1 (Note: Appearance in FIFA Intercontinental Cup)	0	51	0
Botafogo	2025	Série A	17	0	4	0	2	0	—		8	0	7 (Note: One appearance in Supercopa do Brasil, two appearances in Recopa Sudamericana, four appearances in FIFA Club World Cup)	0	38	0
Botafogo	Total		51	0	6	0	6	0	—		18	0	8	0	89	0
Nottingham Forest	2025–26	Premier League	5	0	—		0	0	1	0	3 (Note: Appearances in UEFA Europa League)	0	—		9	0
Career total			90	0	29	0	10	0	1	0	31	0	8	0	169	0

== Honours ==
Santos

- Campeonato Paulista: 2016

Botafogo

- Série A: 2024
- Copa Libertadores: 2024
- Taça Rio: 2024

Individual

- Campeonato Brasileiro Série A Team of the Year: 2024
- Bola de Prata: 2024
- Copa Libertadores Team of the Tournament: 2024
- South American Team of the Year: 2024
