= Jeffinho =

Brazilian footballer

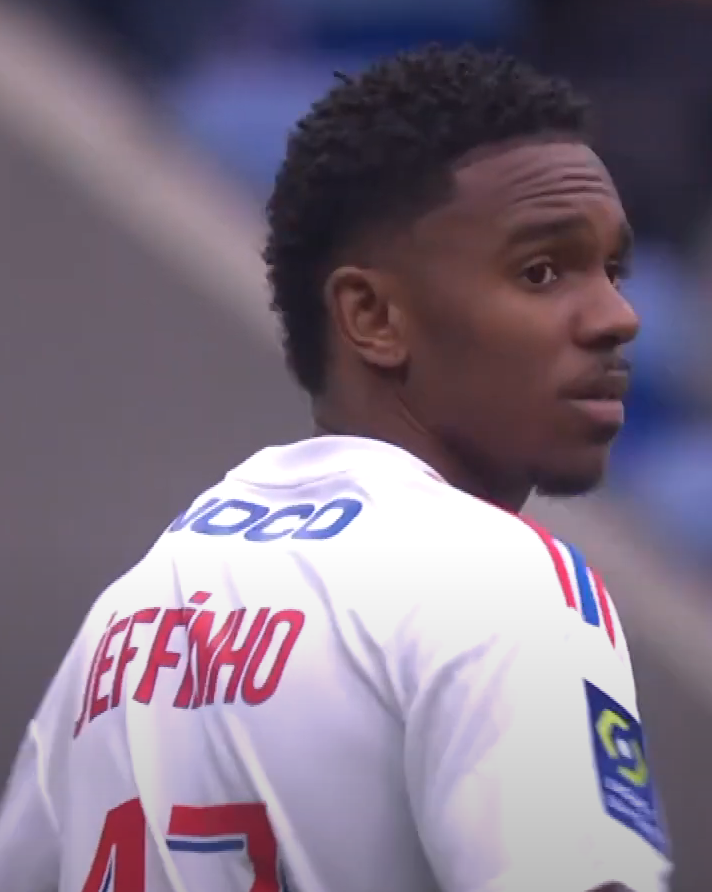
- Jeffinho with Lyon in 2023

Personal information
- Full name: Jefferson Ruan Pereira dos Santos
- Date of birth: 30 December 1999 (age 26)
- Place of birth: Volta Redonda, Brazil
- Height: 1.76 m (5 ft 9 in)
- Position: Winger

Team information
- Current team: Liaoning Tieren (on loan from Botafogo)
- Number: 47

Youth career
- Resende

Senior career*
| Years | Team | Apps | (Gls) |
| 2020–2022 | Resende | 25 | (5) |
| 2021 | → Gama (loan) | 5 | (0) |
| 2022 | → Botafogo (loan) | 10 | (1) |
| 2022–2023 | Botafogo | 14 | (1) |
| 2023–2024 | Lyon | 19 | (2) |
| 2024 | → Botafogo (loan) | 14 | (4) |
| 2025– | Botafogo | 20 | (2) |
| 2026– | → Liaoning Tieren (loan) | 28 | (12) |
- * Club domestic league appearances and goals as of 8 November 2026

Jefferson Ruan Pereira dos Santos (born 30 December 1999), commonly known as Jeffinho, is a Brazilian professional footballer who plays as a winger for Chinese Super League club Liaoning Tieren, on loan from Botafogo.

== Career ==
=== Resende ===
Jeffinho began his career at Resende after playing youth football for Pelé Academia, which had a partnership with the club. He made his first team debut on 28 June 2020, coming on as a second-half substitute and scoring his team's second in a 2–0 Campeonato Carioca away win over Madureira.

Jeffinho continued to feature sparingly for Resende before moving to Gama on loan for the 2021 Série D. Back to his parent club, he impressed during the 2022 Carioca.

=== Botafogo ===
On 12 April 2022, Jeffinho moved to Botafogo on loan; initially assigned to the B-team, Jeffinho was called up to the first team squad of Bota by manager Luís Castro in June 2022. He made his main squad – and Série A – debut on 19 June, replacing Renzo Saravia late into a 3–2 away success over Internacional.

On 26 August 2022, Jeffinho signed a permanent three-year contract with Bota.

=== Lyon ===
On 31 January 2023, Jeffinho joined Ligue 1 club Lyon for a fee of €10 million, signing a contract until June 2027 with the French club.

On 28 February 2023, for his first start with Lyon, he scored his first goal, during a quarter-final of the Coupe de France against Grenoble.

On 3 June 2023, Jeffinho scored his first Ligue 1 goal in a game against Nice.

=== Return to Botafogo ===
On 5 January 2024, Lyon sent Jeffinho back to Botafogo on loan until the end of 2024. On 31 December 2024, his move to Botafogo was made permanent for a reported transfer fee of €5.3 million.

==== Loan to China ====
On 12 January 2026, as reports emerged that Jeffinho was considered surplus to requirements to Botafogo ahead of the 2026 season, he was sent on loan to Chinese Super League club Liaoning Tieren until the end of the campaign.

== Career statistics ==
As of match played 8 November 2026

Appearances and goals by club, season and competition
| Club | Season | League | | | State league (Note: Includes Campeonato Carioca) | | National cup (Note: Includes Copa do Brasil, Coupe de France) | | Continental | | Other | | Total | |
| Club | Season | Division | Apps | Goals | Apps | Goals | Apps | Goals | Apps | Goals | Apps | Goals | Apps | Goals |
|---|---|---|---|---|---|---|---|---|---|---|---|---|---|---|
| Resende | 2020 | Carioca | — | | 2 | 1 | — | | — | | — | | 2 | 1 |
| Resende | 2021 | Carioca | — | | 9 | 2 | — | | — | | — | | 9 | 2 |
| Resende | 2022 | Carioca | — | | 14 | 2 | — | | — | | — | | 14 | 2 |
| Resende | Total | | — | | 25 | 5 | — | | — | | — | | 25 | 5 |
| Gama (loan) | 2021 | Série D | 5 | 0 | — | | — | | — | | — | | 5 | 0 |
| Botafogo | 2022 | Série A | 24 | 2 | — | | 2 | 0 | — | | — | | 26 | 2 |
| Lyon | 2022–23 | Ligue 1 | 9 | 1 | — | | 1 | 1 | — | | — | | 10 | 2 |
| Lyon | 2023–24 | Ligue 1 | 10 | 1 | — | | 0 | 0 | — | | — | | 10 | 1 |
| Lyon | Total | | 19 | 2 | — | | 1 | 1 | — | | — | | 20 | 3 |
| Botafogo (loan) | 2024 | Série A | 7 | 1 | 7 | 3 | 1 | 0 | 4 (Note: Appearances in Copa Libertadores) | 1 | — | | 19 | 5 |
| Botafogo | 2025 | Série A | 17 | 2 | 3 | 0 | 2 | 0 | 3 | 0 | 1 (Note: Appearance in Recopa Sudamericana) | 0 | 26 | 2 |
| Botafogo | Botafogo total | | 24 | 3 | 10 | 3 | 3 | 0 | 7 | 1 | 1 | 0 | 45 | 7 |
| Liaoning Tieren (loan) | 2026 | Chinese Super League | 28 | 12 | — | | 0 | 0 | — | | — | | 28 | 12 |
| Career total | | | 100 | 19 | 35 | 8 | 6 | 1 | 7 | 1 | 1 | 0 | 149 | 29 |

== 2Honours ==
Botafogo

- Série A: 2024
- Copa Libertadores: 2024
- Taça Rio: 2024
