= Mateo Ponte =

Uruguayan footballer (born 2003)

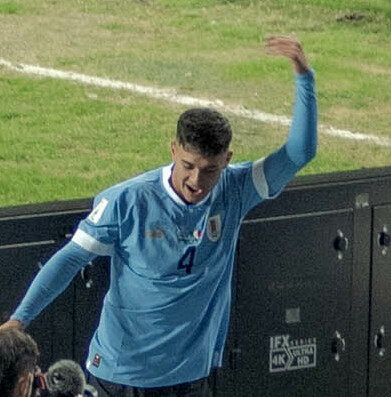
- Ponte with Uruguay U20 in 2023

Personal information
- Full name: Mateo Ponte Costa
- Date of birth: 24 May 2003 (age 23)
- Place of birth: Montevideo, Uruguay
- Height: 1.83 m (6 ft 0 in)
- Position: Right-back

Team information
- Current team: Botafogo
- Number: 4

Youth career
- Danubio

Senior career*
Years	Team	Apps	(Gls)
2021–2023	Danubio	22	(1)
2023–	Botafogo	67	(5)

International career
2021–2023	Uruguay U20	36	(3)
2024	Uruguay U23	6	(0)
Medal record
Men's football
Representing Uruguay
FIFA U-20 World Cup
Winner	2023 Argentina
South American U-20 Championship
Runner-up	2023 Colombia
- * Club domestic league appearances and goals as of 12 September 2026

Mateo Ponte Costa (born 24 May 2003) is a Uruguayan professional footballer who plays as a right-back for Campeonato Brasileiro Série A club Botafogo.

== Club career ==
=== Danubio ===
A youth academy graduate of Danubio, Ponte made his professional debut on 4 February 2021 in a 4–0 league win against River Plate Montevideo.

=== Botafogo ===
On 2 August 2023, Ponte signed a three-and-a-half-year contract with Campeonato Brasileiro Série A side Botafogo.

In August, Mateo Ponte debuted with the Botafogo shirt in the 3–0 victory over Bahia, at the Nilton Santos Stadium, in the 21st round of the Brazilian Championship.

In July 2025, Mateo Ponte received a $4 million offer from Al Jazira of the United Arab Emirates to leave Botafogo. Adapted, a multiple-champion, and identified with the club, the right-back declined the offer to remain with the team.

In September 2025, Botafogo announced the renewal of Mateo Ponte's contract until July 2028.

== International career ==
Ponte is a current Uruguayan youth international. He was a part of the Uruguayan side that won the 2023 FIFA U-20 World Cup in Argentina.

In June 2023, Ponte received his first call-up to the senior team for friendlies against Nicaragua and Cuba. In January 2024, he was named in Uruguay's squad for the 2024 CONMEBOL Pre-Olympic Tournament.

== Career statistics ==
As of 8 December 2024

Appearances and goals by club, season and competition
Club	Season	League			State league		National cup (Note: Includes Copa Uruguay, Copa do Brasil)		Continental		Total	
Club	Season	Division	Apps	Goals	Apps	Goals	Apps	Goals	Apps	Goals	Apps	Goals
Danubio	2020	UPD	10	0	—		—		—		10	0
Danubio	2021	USD	3	0	—		—		—		3	0
Danubio	2022	UPD	1	0	—		1	0	—		2	0
Danubio	2023	UPD	8	1	—		0	0	0	0	8	1
Danubio	Total		22	1	0	0	1	0	0	0	23	1
Botafogo	2023	Série A	1	0	—		—		1 (Note: Appearance in Copa Sudamericana)	0	2	0
Botafogo	2024	Série A	17	3	6 (Note: Appearances in Campeonato Carioca)	0	3	0	13 (Note: Appearances in Copa Libertadores)	0	39	3
Botafogo	Total		18	3	6	0	3	0	14	0	41	3
Career total			40	4	6	0	4	0	14	0	64	4

== Honours ==
Botafogo

- Copa Libertadores: 2024
- Campeonato Brasileiro Série A: 2024

Uruguay U20

- FIFA U-20 World Cup: 2023
- South American U-20 Championship runner-up: 2023
