= Lucas Halter =

Brazilian footballer (born 2000)

- Halter with Houston Dynamo FC in 2026

Personal information
- Full name: Lucas Halter
- Date of birth: 2 May 2000 (age 26)
- Place of birth: Salto, São Paulo, Brazil
- Height: 1.87 m (6 ft 2 in)
- Position: Centre-back

Team information
- Current team: Houston Dynamo
- Number: 5

Youth career
- 2011–2015: Primavera
- 2016: Trieste
- 2016–2019: Athletico Paranaense

Senior career*
Years	Team	Apps	(Gls)
2019–2023	Athletico Paranaense	50	(4)
2022–2023	→ Goiás (loan)	57	(5)
2024–2026	Botafogo	29	(2)
2025	→ Vitória (loan)	37	(5)
2026–	Houston Dynamo	21	(1)

International career^{‡}
2017	Brazil U17	15	(1)
- * Club domestic league appearances and goals as of 2 November 2026 ‡ National team caps and goals as of 18:02, 17 June 2019 (UTC)

Lucas Halter (born 2 May 2000) is a Brazilian professional footballer who plays as a centre-back for Houston Dynamo.

== Club career ==
=== Early career ===
Born in Salto, São Paulo, Halter played for local futsal sides aside from playing for the youth categories of Primavera. In 2016, he was invited to join Trieste, but spent a short period at the club before joining Atlético Paranaense.

=== Athletico Paranaense ===
On 15 June 2018, Halter renewed his contract with Atlético until 2021. He made his first team debut the following 27 January, coming on as a late substitute for Robson Bambu in a 2–0 Campeonato Paranaense away win over Rio Branco-PR.

Halter scored his first senior goal on 10 March 2019, netting his team's fourth in a 8–2 home routing of Toledo. He made his Série A debut on 19 May, starting in a 2–0 home loss to Corinthians, and further extended his link until 2024 on 12 November.

Mainly a backup option during the following years, Halters suffered an Achilles tendon rupture in May 2021, being sidelined for the remainder of the year.

==== Loan to Goiás ====
On 18 July 2022, Halter was loaned to fellow top tier Goiás until the end of the year. After becoming a starter in the last rounds of the year, his loan was extended for a further season in December.

A regular starter for the Esmeraldino during the 2023 campaign, Halter returned to Athletico in December, after his parent club rejected an offer from Goiás in August.

=== Botafogo ===
On 7 January 2024, Botafogo announced the signing Halter on a four-year deal, for a rumoured fee of US$ 2 million. Initially a starter, he lost his starting spot in June, and fell down the pecking order after the arrivals of Bastos and Adryelson.

=== Houston Dynamo ===
On 12 January 2025, Halter signed with Major League Soccer side Houston Dynamo until the end of their 2029-30 season for an undisclosed transfer fee.

== Career statistics ==
=== Club ===
As of 6 January 2025.

Club	Season	League			State League		Cup		Continental		Other		Total	
Club	Season	Division	Apps	Goals	Apps	Goals	Apps	Goals	Apps	Goals	Apps	Goals	Apps	Goals
Athletico Paranaense	2019	Série A	9	0	11	2	4	0	0	0	1 (Note: Appearance(s) in J.League Cup / Copa Sudamericana Championship)	0	25	2
Athletico Paranaense	2020	Série A	9	0	8	2	0	0	2 (Note: Appearance(s) in Copa Libertadores)	0	1 (Note: Appearance(s) in Supercopa do Brasil)	0	20	2
Athletico Paranaense	2021	Série A	0	0	7	0	0	0	0	0	—		7	0
Athletico Paranaense	2022	Série A	2	0	4	0	1	0	2	0	—		9	0
Athletico Paranaense	Total		20	0	30	4	5	0	4	0	2	0	61	4
Goiás	2022	Série A	15	0	—		—		—		—		15	0
Goiás	2023	Série A	30	3	12	2	2	0	6 (Note: Appearance(s) in Copa Sudamericana)	0	4 (Note: Appearance(s) in Copa Verde)	1	54	6
Goiás	Total		45	3	12	2	2	0	6	0	4	1	69	6
Botafogo	2024	Série A	17	1	11	1	2	0	9	0	0	0	39	2
Career total			82	4	53	7	9	0	19	0	6	1	169	12

== Honours ==
Atlético Paranaense

- Campeonato Paranaense: 2019, 2020
- J.League Cup / Copa Sudamericana Championship: 2019
- Copa do Brasil: 2019

Goiás

- Copa Verde: 2023

Botafogo

- Copa Libertadores: 2024
- Campeonato Brasileiro Série A: 2024
