= Emerson Urso =

Brazilian footballer

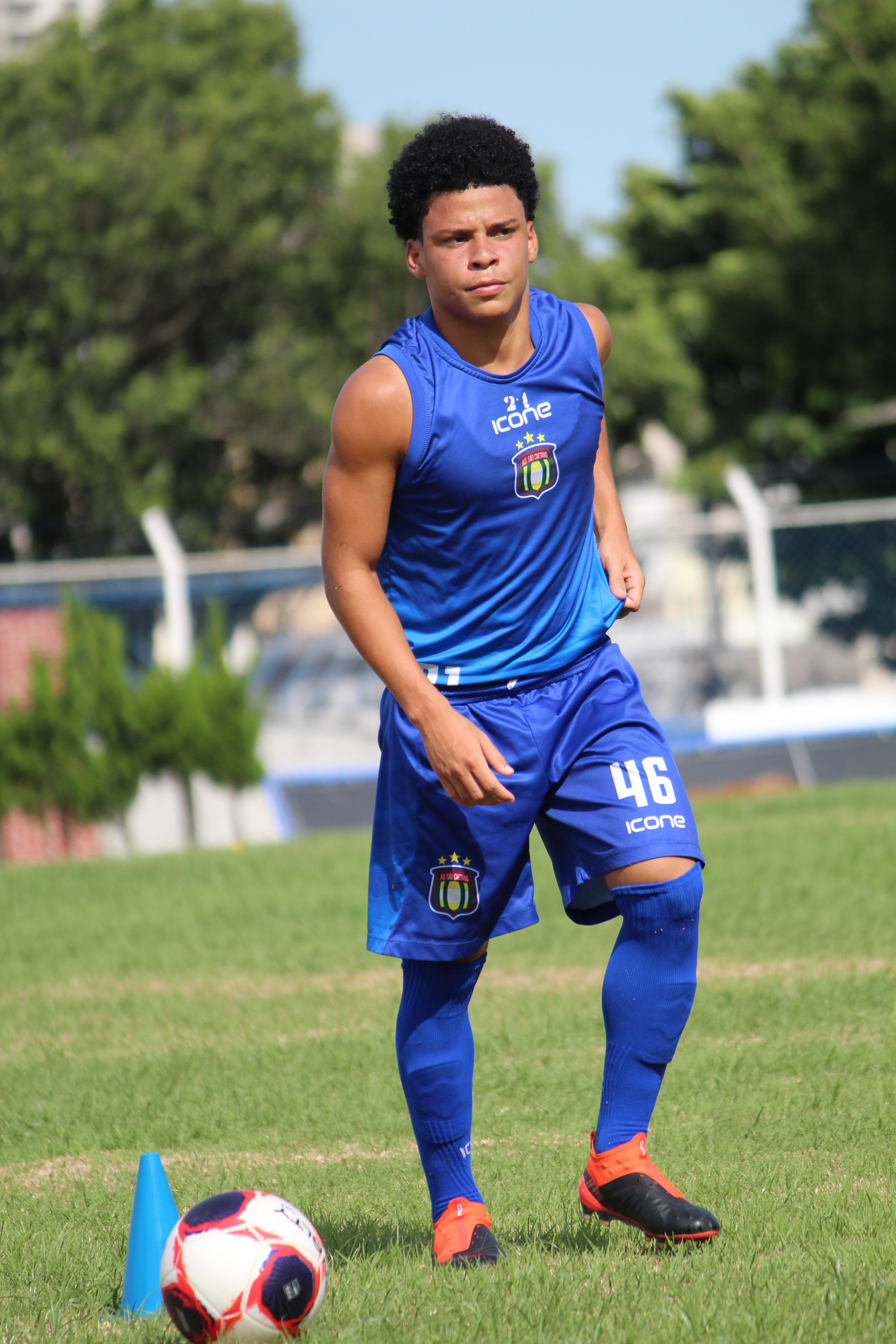
- Emerson Urso with São Caetano in 2021

Personal information
- Full name: Emerson Lima Freitas
- Date of birth: 13 May 2001 (age 25)
- Place of birth: Duque de Caxias, Brazil
- Height: 1.69 m (5 ft 7 in)
- Position: Forward

Team information
- Current team: Vila Nova
- Number: 70

Youth career
- São Caetano
- 2021: → Vasco da Gama (loan)
- 2021–2022: → Corinthians (loan)

Senior career*
Years	Team	Apps	(Gls)
2020–2023	São Caetano	19	(0)
2022	→ Santo André (loan)	5	(0)
2023	→ Audax Rio (loan)	14	(3)
2023	→ Resende (loan)	11	(2)
2023	→ Ituano (loan)	12	(0)
2024	Botafogo	5	(1)
2024	→ Vila Nova (loan)	23	(3)
2025–	Vila Nova	23	(4)
- * Club domestic league appearances and goals as of 14 April 2026

Emerson Lima Freitas (born 13 May 2001), known as Emerson Urso, is a Brazilian footballer who plays as a forward for Vila Nova.

== Career ==
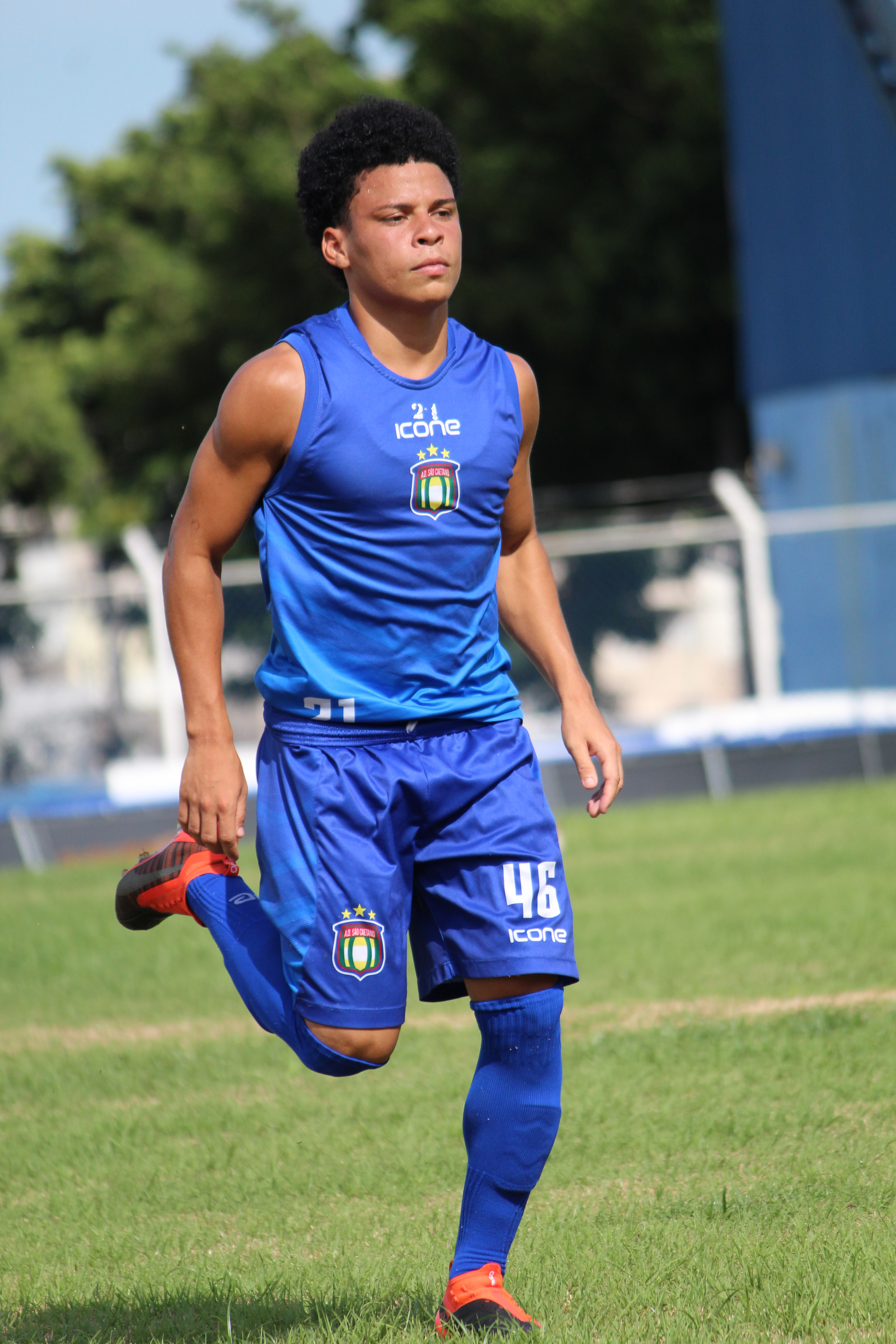
Emerson Urso with São Caetano in 2021

Born in Duque de Caxias, Rio de Janeiro, Emerson Urso represented São Caetano as a youth. After making his first team debut in the 2020 season, he was loaned to Vasco da Gama on 19 May 2021, being assigned to the under-20 squad.

On 28 September 2021, Emerson Urso moved to Corinthians also in a temporary deal, being also a member of the under-20 team. The following 1 February, he was announced at Santo André on loan until the end of the 2022 Campeonato Paulista.

After returning to São Caetano for the 2022 Copa Paulista, Emerson Urso was named as a part of the Audax Rio squad for the upcoming season in December. After being regularly used, he was announced at Resende on 2 May 2023.

On 2 August 2023, Emerson Urso agreed to a pre-contract with Botafogo, but was loaned out to Série B side Ituano for the remainder of the year.

== Career statistics ==
As of 2 December 2024.

Club	Season	League			State League		Cup		Continental		Other		Total	
Club	Season	Division	Apps	Goals	Apps	Goals	Apps	Goals	Apps	Goals	Apps	Goals	Apps	Goals
São Caetano	2020	Série D	9	0	2	0	—		—		—		11	0
São Caetano	2021	Paulista	—		8	0	—		—		—		8	0
São Caetano	2022	Paulista A2	—		—		—		—		14 (Note: Appearance(s) in Copa Paulista)	2	14	2
São Caetano	Total		9	0	10	0	—		—		14	2	33	2
Santo André (loan)	2022	Série D	0	0	5	0	—		—		—		5	0
Audax Rio (loan)	2023	Carioca	—		14	3	—		—		—		14	3
Resende (loan)	2023	Série D	11	2	—		—		—		—		11	2
Ituano (loan)	2023	Série B	12	0	—		—		—		—		12	0
Botafogo	2024	Série A	0	0	5	1	0	0	0	0	—		5	1
Vila Nova (loan)	2024	Série B	23	3	—		—		—		—		23	3
Career total			55	8	34	4	0	0	0	0	14	2	103	14
