= Danilo Barbosa =

Brazilian footballer (born 1996)

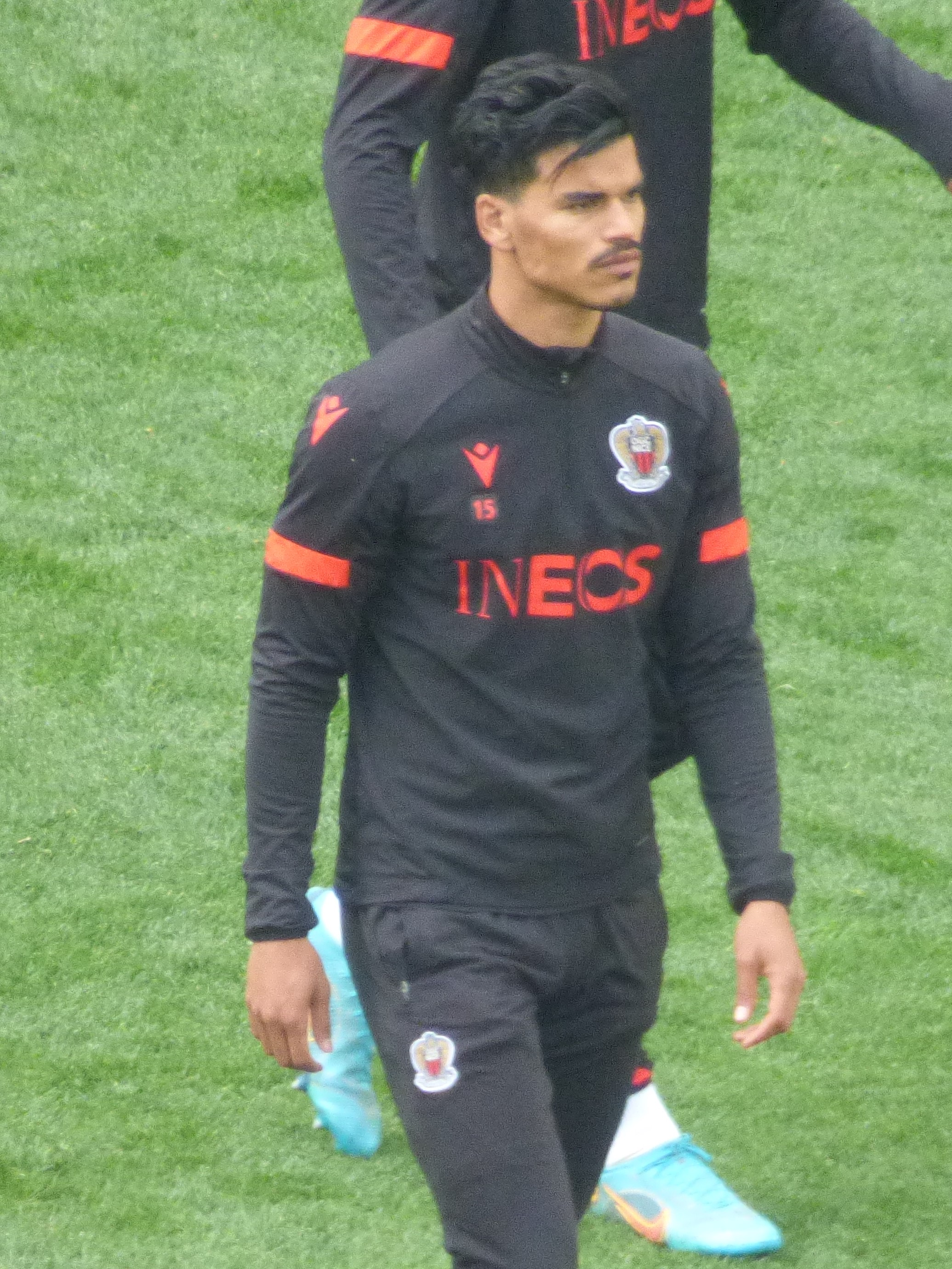
- Danilo Barbosa with Nice in 2022

Personal information
- Full name: Danilo Barbosa da Silva
- Date of birth: 28 February 1996 (age 30)
- Place of birth: Simões Filho, Brazil
- Height: 1.83 m (6 ft 0 in)
- Position: Defensive midfielder

Team information
- Current team: Grêmio
- Number: 15

Youth career
- Vitória
- 2011–2013: Vasco da Gama

Senior career*
Years	Team	Apps	(Gls)
2014	Vasco da Gama	6	(0)
2014–2018	Braga	74	(6)
2015−2016	→ Valencia (loan)	19	(0)
2016–2017	→ Benfica (loan)	2	(0)
2017	→ Standard Liège (loan)	6	(0)
2018–2022	Nice	43	(0)
2021	→ Palmeiras (loan)	23	(0)
2022–2025	Botafogo	60	(7)
2025–2026	Al-Ula	21	(2)
2026–	Grêmio	0	(0)

International career^{‡}
2011	Brazil U15		
2013	Brazil U17	5	(0)
2015	Brazil U20	8	(1)
2014	Brazil U23	5	(0)
- * Club domestic league appearances and goals as of 22:46, 11 February 2026 (UTC) ‡ National team caps and goals as of 15 November 2014

Danilo Barbosa da Silva (born 28 February 1996), known as Danilo Barbosa or simply Danilo, is a Brazilian professional footballer who plays as a defensive midfielder for Campeonato Brasileiro Série A club Grêmio.

== Club career ==
=== Vasco da Gama ===
Born in Simões Filho, Bahia, Danilo Barbosa joined Vasco da Gama's youth setup in 2011, after starting it out at Vitória. On 26 September 2013, before even making his debut as a senior, he was sold to Gestifute for a €4.5 million fee and was assigned to S.C. Braga, with the move only being effective in July 2014.

Danilo Barbosa was promoted to the cruzmaltino's main squad in January 2014, and made his senior debut on 2 February, coming on as a late substitute for Edmílson in a 1–0 home win against Botafogo for the Campeonato Carioca championship. On 19 April he made his Série B debut, starting in a 1–1 home draw against América Mineiro.

=== Braga ===
On 3 July 2014, Danilo Barbosa joined Braga. He made his debut for the club on 20 September, playing the full 90 minutes in a 1–1 Primeira Liga away draw against C.D. Nacional. On 26 October, he was sent off in a 2–1 win over S.L. Benfica at the Estádio Municipal de Braga. Danilo scored his first professional goal on 3 January 2015, netting the first in a 1–2 away loss against C.S. Marítimo; he added another on the 18th, in a 3–1 success at Vitória de Setúbal. An undisputed starter when available, his performances attracted the interest of other clubs.

==== Loan to Valencia ====
On 15 July 2015, Danilo Barbosa signed for La Liga side Valencia CF on loan, with an option to buy at the end of the season. He made his debut on 22 August in the first game of the campaign, playing the entirety of a goalless draw at Rayo Vallecano.

==== Loan to Benfica ====
On 28 July 2016, Danilo joined defending champions Benfica on a season-long loan deal. Danilo missed the Supertaça match since Benfica could not register the player at FPF for him to be available in time. He made his first game for them on 14 October against 1º de Dezembro, scoring the opening goal in a 2–1 win.

==== Loan to Standard Liège ====
After only five appearances with two starts, both in the Taça de Portugal, Danilo's loan spell at Benfica was cut short and he moved to Standard Liège for the remainder of the season, again loaned by Braga. In the Belgian club, he played six games, starting two.

=== Nice ===
For 2017–18 and after two seasons on loan, Danilo returned to Braga, helping them finish fourth in the Primeira Liga, before signing with French club Nice on 10 June 2018.

=== Botafogo ===
On 12 August 2022, Danilo signed a contract with Botafogo until the end of 2025.

=== Al-Ula ===
On 2 August 2025, Danilo joined Saudi First Division League club Al-Ula.

== International career ==
Danilo Barbosa represented Brazil in multiple youth levels. After representing the under-15s in 2011 South American Under-15 Football Championship and the under-17s in 2013 FIFA U-17 World Cup, he was called up to the under-20s ahead of 2015 FIFA U-20 World Cup.

Danilo Barbosa started in all matches of the latter tournament, acting as captain. He scored his team's first through a header in a 2–1 win against Hungary, and was also awarded the competition's Silver Ball, with his side finishing second.

== Career statistics ==
As of 7 December 2023.

Appearances and goals by club, season and competition
Club	Season	League			State League		Cup		League Cup		Continental		Other		Total	
Club	Season	Division	Apps	Goals	Apps	Goals	Apps	Goals	Apps	Goals	Apps	Goals	Apps	Goals	Apps	Goals
Vasco da Gama	2014	Série A	3	0	3	0	3	0	—		—		—		9	0
Braga	2014–15	Primeira Liga	23	2	—		4	0	1	0	—		—		28	2
Braga	2017–18	Primeira Liga	31	4	—		1	0	4	0	10	0	—		49	0
Braga	Total		54	6	—		5	0	5	0	10	0	—		77	2
Valencia (loan)	2015–16	La Liga	19	0	—		6	0	—		9	0	—		34	0
Benfica (loan)	2016–17	Primeira Liga	2	0	—		3	1	0	0	0	0	0	0	5	1
Standard Liège (loan)	2016–17	Belgian First Division A	6	0	—		—		—		—		0	0	6	0
Nice	2018–19	Ligue 1	22	0	—		0	0	2	0	—		—		24	2
Nice	2019–20	Ligue 1	16	0	—		3	1	1	0	—		—		20	1
Nice	2020–21	Ligue 1	4	0	—		0	0	—		1	0	—		5	0
Nice	2021–22	Ligue 1	1	0	—		0	0	—		—		—		1	0
Nice	Total		43	0	—		3	1	3	0	1	0	—		50	1
Palmeiras (loan)	2021	Série A	15	0	8	0	0	0	—		7	1	0	0	30	1
Botafogo	2022	Série A	6	0	—		—		—		—		—		6	0
Botafogo	2023	Série A	23	3	8	0	3	1	—		8	0	—		42	4
Botafogo	Total		29	3	8	0	3	1	—		8	0	—		48	4
Career total			171	9	19	0	23	3	8	0	35	1	0	0	256	13

== Honours ==
Braga

- Taça de Portugal runner-up: 2014–15

Benfica

- Primeira Liga: 2016–17
- Taça de Portugal: 2016–17
- Supertaça Cândido de Oliveira: 2016

Palmeiras

- Copa Libertadores: 2021

Brazil U17

- Toulon Tournament: 2013

Botafogo

- Taça Rio: 2023, 2024
- Copa Libertadores: 2024
- Campeonato Brasileiro Série A: 2024

Brazil U20

- FIFA U-20 World Cup: Runner-up 2015

Individual

- FIFA U-20 World Cup Silver Ball: 2015
