= Carlos Alberto (footballer, born 2002) =

Brazilian footballer

Personal information
- Full name: Carlos Alberto Gomes da Silva Filho
- Date of birth: 14 April 2002 (age 24)
- Place of birth: João Pessoa, Brazil
- Height: 1.79 m (5 ft 10 in)
- Position: Winger

Team information
- Current team: Kalba (on loan from Sport)
- Number: 99

Youth career
- 2018–2020: América Mineiro

Senior career*
Years	Team	Apps	(Gls)
2020–2023	América Mineiro	25	(2)
2023	→ Botafogo (loan)	26	(3)
2024	Botafogo	9	(1)
2024	→ RWD Molenbeek (loan)	14	(3)
2025–	Sport	17	(2)
2025	→ Cuiabá (loan)	23	(5)
2026–	→ Kalba (loan)	0	(0)

International career
2020	Brazil U20	3	(0)
- * Club domestic league appearances and goals as of 17 December 2025

Carlos Alberto Gomes da Silva Filho (born 14 April 2002), known as Carlos Alberto, is a Brazilian professional footballer who plays as a winger for UAE Pro League club Kalba, on loan from Brazilian Serie A club Sport.

== Club career ==
Carlos Alberto made his professional debut for América Mineiro on the 18 February 2020, coming on as a substitute against Coimbra in a Campeonato Mineiro 2–0 away win.

== International career ==
Carlos Alberto was selected by André Jardine with Brazil under-20 in Octobre 2020 for a quadrangular tournament. He played 3 games in December, against Bolivia, Peru and Chile, eventually winning the tournament.

== Honours ==
Botafogo

- Copa Libertadores: 2024
- Campeonato Brasileiro Série A: 2024
