= Danrley =

Brazilian footballer (born 2001)

Personal information
- Full name: Danrley Ulisses Paulo Dubois Feitosa
- Date of birth: 22 March 2001 (age 25)
- Place of birth: Nova Iguaçu, Brazil
- Height: 1.80 m (5 ft 11 in)
- Position: Midfielder

Team information
- Current team: Floresta (on loan from Volta Redonda)
- Number: 8

Youth career
- Real-RS
- 2019–2021: Ponte Preta
- 2021: → Palmeiras (loan)

Senior career*
Years	Team	Apps	(Gls)
2020–2023	Ponte Preta	13	(0)
2022–2023	→ Volta Redonda (loan)	20	(0)
2023–	Volta Redonda	13	(0)
2024–2025	→ Cianorte (loan)	32	(2)
2026–	→ Floresta (loan)	31	(0)
- * Club domestic league appearances and goals as of 9 November 2026

Danrley Ulisses Paulo Dubois Feitosa (born 22 March 2001), simply known as Danrley, is a Brazilian footballer who plays as a midfielder for Floresta, on loan from Volta Redonda.

== Club career ==
Born in Nova Iguaçu, Rio de Janeiro, Danrley joined Ponte Preta's youth setup in 2019, from Real Sport Clube. In December 2019, he was promoted to the former's first team for the 2020 Campeonato Paulista.

Danrley made his first team debut on 30 January 2020, coming on as a second-half substitute for João Paulo in a 2–1 home win against Corinthians. On 20 February of the following year, after featuring sparingly, he was loaned to Palmeiras until December, and returned to the youth setup.

== Career statistics ==
As of 27 February 2021.

Club	Season	League			State League		Cup		Continental		Other		Total	
Club	Season	Division	Apps	Goals	Apps	Goals	Apps	Goals	Apps	Goals	Apps	Goals	Apps	Goals
Ponte Preta	2020	Série B	5	0	8	0	5	0	—		—		18	0
Volta Redonda (loan)	2022	Série C	8	0	6	0	—		—		—		14	0
Career total			13	0	14	5	0	0	0	0	0	0	32	0
