= Hugo (footballer, born 2001) =

Brazilian footballer

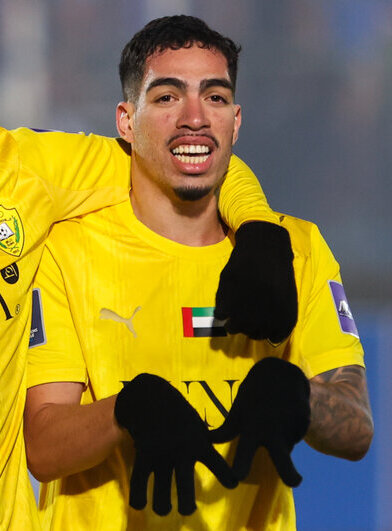
- Hugo playing for Al Wasl in 2025

Personal information
- Full name: Hugo Gonçalves Ferreira Neto
- Date of birth: 20 September 2001 (age 25)
- Place of birth: Cabedelo, Brazil
- Height: 1.75 m (5 ft 9 in)
- Position: Left back

Team information
- Current team: Al Wasl
- Number: 16

Youth career
- Corinthians
- 2019–2021: Botafogo

Senior career*
Years	Team	Apps	(Gls)
2020–2025	Botafogo	86	(1)
2025	→ Vitória (loan)	11	(1)
2025–	Al Wasl	2	(0)
- * Club domestic league appearances and goals as of 24 March 2025

Hugo Gonçalves Ferreira Neto (born 20 September 2001), simply known as Hugo, is a Brazilian footballer who plays as a left back for Al Wasl.

== Club career ==
Born in Cabedelo, Paraíba, Hugo joined Botafogo's youth setup in 2019, from Corinthians. He made his first team – and Série A – debut on 20 September 2020, coming on as a late substitute for Victor Luis in a 0–0 home draw against Santos.

On 12 November 2021, Hugo renewed his contract with Bota until 2024.

== Career statistics ==
As of 23 April 2024.

Club	Season	League			State League		Cup		Continental		Other		Total	
Club	Season	Division	Apps	Goals	Apps	Goals	Apps	Goals	Apps	Goals	Apps	Goals	Apps	Goals
Botafogo	2020	Série A	7	0	0	0	0	0	—		—		7	0
Botafogo	2021	Série B	10	0	2	0	0	0	—		—		12	0
Botafogo	2022	Série A	16	1	5	0	3	0	—		—		24	1
Botafogo	2023	Série A	22	0	9	0	3	0	6 (Note: Appearance(s) in Copa Sudamericana)	1	—		38	1
Botafogo	2024	Série A	3	0	12	0	0	0	6 (Note: Appearance(s) in Copa Libertadores)	1	—		21	1
Career total			58	1	28	0	6	0	12	2	0	0	104	3

== Honours ==
Botafogo

- Campeonato Brasileiro Série B: 2021
- Taça Rio: 2023, 2024
- Copa Libertadores: 2024
- Campeonato Brasileiro Série A: 2024
