= Júnior Santos (footballer, born 1994) =

Brazilian footballer

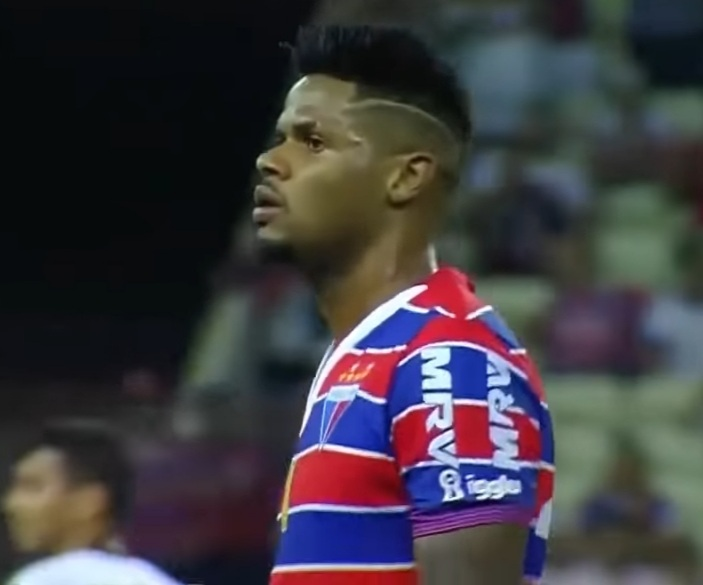
- Santos in 2019

Personal information
- Full name: José Antonio dos Santos Júnior
- Date of birth: 11 October 1994 (age 32)
- Place of birth: Conceição do Jacuípe, Brazil
- Height: 1.88 m (6 ft 2 in)
- Position: Forward

Team information
- Current team: Botafogo (on loan from Atlético Mineiro)
- Number: 7

Senior career*
Years	Team	Apps	(Gls)
2017	Osvaldo Cruz	17	(5)
2018	Ituano	11	(4)
2018	→ Ponte Preta (loan)	38	(9)
2019	Fortaleza	16	(2)
2019–2020	Kashiwa Reysol	9	(0)
2020	→ Yokohama F. Marinos (loan)	22	(13)
2021–2022	Sanfrecce Hiroshima	57	(9)
2022	→ Botafogo (loan)	15	(1)
2023	Fortaleza	4	(0)
2023–2024	Botafogo	73	(16)
2025–	Atlético Mineiro	20	(2)
2026–	→ Botafogo (loan)	6	(1)
- * Club domestic league appearances and goals as of 7 April 2026

José Antonio dos Santos Júnior (born 11 October 1994), known as Júnior Santos, is a Brazilian professional footballer who plays as a forward for Botafogo, on loan from Atlético Mineiro.

== Career ==
=== Early career ===
Born in Conceição do Jacuípe, Bahia, Júnior Santos worked as a bricklayer until age 20, when he moved to the state capital of Salvador and played amateur football. Three years later, a prophecy in church foretold his future as a travelling professional footballer.

After a friend invited him for trials at Osvaldo Cruz almost 2,000 kilometres away in São Paulo, Júnior Santos impressed scouts, signed permanently and made his senior debut on 8 August 2017 by starting in a 1–1 away draw against Presidente Prudente FC in the Campeonato Paulista Segunda Divisão.

On 25 June 2017, he netted his first two goals in a 2–2 home draw against José Bonifácio, ending the season with five goals in 20 appearances as Osvaldo Cruz was knocked out in the quarterfinals.

=== Ituano ===
On 11 January 2018, Júnior Santos was presented at Ituano. He made his debut for the club on 3 February 2018, coming on as a second-half substitute in a 1–1 Campeonato Paulista home draw against Ponte Preta.

Júnior Santos scored his first professional goal on 26 February 2018, netting the game's only in a home defeat of Red Bull Brasil. He finished the tournament with four goals in 11 appearances.

==== Loan to Ponte Preta ====
On 8 April 2018, Júnior Santos was loaned to Série B side Ponte Preta until the end of the year, with a buyout clause. On his debut for the club four days later, he scored the last in a 3–0 home win against Náutico for the year's Copa do Brasil.

=== Fortaleza ===
On 19 December 2018, Júnior Santos moved to Série A club Fortaleza on a three-year contract, after the club bought 50% of his economic rights. He was a part of the team that won both the Campeonato Cearense and the Copa do Nordeste, being the joint top-scorer in the latter competition with eight goals.

Júnior Santos made his top tier debut on 28 April 2019, starting in a 4–0 away loss to Palmeiras.

=== Kashiwa Reysol ===
On 26 June 2019, Júnior Santos moved abroad for the first time in his career, after signing for J2 League side Kashiwa Reysol. He achieved promotion as champions in his first year, but only featured in eight matches.

==== Loan to Yokohama F. Marinos ====
On 11 August 2020, after being rarely used, Júnior Santos was loaned to Yokohama F. Marinos for the remainder of the year. He scored 13 times for the club in only 22 league matches, being their top goalscorer during the season.

=== Sanfrecce Hiroshima ===
In January 2022, Júnior Santos signed a permanent deal with Sanfrecce Hiroshima.

==== Loan to Botafogo ====
On 18 August 2022, Júnior Santos was presented at Botafogo, after agreeing to a loan deal until the end of the year. Despite being regularly used, he left the club in December, after Sanfrecce refused a new loan deal.

=== Fortaleza return ===
On 20 January 2023, Júnior Santos returned to Fortaleza on a three-year contract, after the club paid US$700,000 for his economic rights.

=== Botafogo return ===
On 31 March 2023, Fortaleza announced the transfer of Júnior Santos to Botafogo, with his new club taking over Fortaleza's debt with Sanfrecce plus a US$200,000 fee. He became an immediate first-choice for the Fogão, scoring four times in a 6–0 Copa Libertadores home routing of Aurora on 28 February 2024. Botafogo went on to win the Libertadores itself.

=== Atlético Mineiro ===
On 24 January 2025, Júnior Santos joined Atlético Mineiro on a four-year deal.

==== Second Botafogo return on loan ====
On 6 March 2026, Júnior Santos returned to Botafogo on a season-long loan.

== Career statistics ==
As of 15 December 2025

Appearances and goals by club, season and competition
Club	Season	League			State league (Note: Includes Campeonato Paulista, Campeonato Cearense, Campeonato Carioca, Campeonato Mineiro)		National cup (Note: Includes Copa do Brasil, Emperor's Cup)		Continental		Other		Total	
Club	Season	Division	Apps	Goals	Apps	Goals	Apps	Goals	Apps	Goals	Apps	Goals	Apps	Goals
Osvaldo Cruz	2017	Paulista 2ª Divisão	—		17	5	—		—		—		17	5
Ituano	2018	Paulista	—		11	4	0	0	—		—		11	4
Ponte Preta (loan)	2018	Série B	34	8	—		4	1	—		—		38	9
Fortaleza (loan)	2019	Série A	6	0	10	2	2	0	—		9 (Note: Appearance(s) in Copa do Nordeste)	8	27	10
Kashiwa Reysol	2019	J2 League	8	0	—		1	0	—		0	0	9	0
Kashiwa Reysol	2020	J1 League	1	0	—		0	0	—		0	0	1	0
Kashiwa Reysol	Total		9	0	—		1	0	—		0	0	10	0
Yokohama F. Marinos (loan)	2020	J1 League	22	13	—		0	0	0	0	1 (Note: Appearance(s) in J.League Cup)	0	23	13
Sanfrecce Hiroshima	2021	J1 League	35	7	—		1	0	—		6	0	42	7
Sanfrecce Hiroshima	2022	J1 League	22	2	—		3	0	—		7	6	32	8
Sanfrecce Hiroshima	Total		57	9	—		4	0	—		13	6	74	15
Botafogo (loan)	2022	Série A	15	1	—		—		—		—		15	1
Fortaleza	2023	Série A	0	0	4	0	0	0	2 (Note: Appearance(s) in Copa Libertadores)	0	2	0	8	0
Botafogo	2023	Série A	37	7	—		3	0	10 (Note: Appearance(s) in Copa Sudamericana)	0	—		50	7
Botafogo	2024	Série A	24	4	12	5	2	1	11	10	1 (Note: Appearance(s) in FIFA Intercontinental Cup)	0	50	20
Botafogo	Total		61	11	12	5	5	1	21	10	1	0	100	27
Atlético Mineiro	2025	Série A	16	2	4	0	2	0	6	0	—		28	2
Career total			220	44	58	16	18	2	29	10	26	14	351	86

== Honours ==
Fortaleza

- Campeonato Cearense: 2019
- Copa do Nordeste: 2019

Kashiwa Reysol

- J2 League: 2019

Botafogo

- Taça Rio: 2024
- Copa Libertadores: 2024
- Campeonato Brasileiro Série A: 2024

Atlético Mineiro

- Campeonato Mineiro: 2025

Individual

- Copa do Nordeste Team of the Tournament: 2019
- Copa do Nordeste Top scorer: 2019
- J.League Cup Top scorer: 2022
- Copa Libertadores Top scorer: 2024
