= Kauê (footballer, born October 2004) =

Brazilian footballer

Personal information
- Full name: Kauê Rodrigues Pessanha
- Date of birth: 22 October 2004 (age 22)
- Place of birth: Quissamã, Brazil
- Height: 1.73 m (5 ft 8 in)
- Position: Midfielder

Team information
- Current team: Porto B
- Number: 56

Youth career
- 2017–2024: Botafogo

Senior career*
Years	Team	Apps	(Gls)
2024–2025	Botafogo	24	(4)
2025–	Porto B	27	(2)

International career^{‡}
2019	Brazil U15	1	(0)
2023	Brazil U20	1	(0)
- * Club domestic league appearances and goals as of 19 June 2026 ‡ National team caps and goals as of 13:04, 2 December 2025 (UTC)

Kauê Rodrigues Pessanha (born 22 October 2004) is a Brazilian professional footballer who plays as a midfielder for Liga Portugal 2 club FC Porto B.

== Club career ==
Kauê joined the academy of Botafogo in 2017, rising through the club's youth teams and playing under-20 football while still only 16. He signed his first professional contract in April 2022, before training with the first team in September of the same year.

Having impressed in first team training, he was reported to have been integrated permanently ahead of the 2023 season.

On 30 July 2025, Kauê moved to Portugal, joining Porto's reserve team, competing in Liga Portugal 2, on a five-year contract.

== International career ==
Valim was first called up to the Brazil under-20 team in May 2022.

== Honours ==
Botafogo

- Copa Libertadores: 2024
- Campeonato Brasileiro Série A: 2024
