= 2026 Esporte Clube Juventude season =

Esporte Clube Juventude
2026 season
- President: Fábio Pizzamiglio
- Manager: Maurício Barbieri
- Stadium: Estádio Alfredo Jaconi
- Série B: 3rd
- Campeonato Gaúcho: Semi-finals
- Copa do Brasil: Round of 16
- Copa Sul-Sudeste: Group stage
- Top goalscorer: Raí (7)
- Biggest win: Juventude 5–0 Guaporé
Home colours	Away colours	Third colours

In the 2026 season, Esporte Clube Juventude competes in the Campeonato Brasileiro Série B, the Campeonato Gaúcho, the Copa do Brasil, and the Copa Sul-Sudeste. The club was relegated to the second division after two seasons in the top division.

== Transfers ==
=== In ===
Pos.	Player	Transferred from	Fee	Date	Source
GK	(Brazil) Pedro Rocha	(Brazil) Ponte Preta		13 December 2025	
DF	(Brazil) Messias	(Brazil) Santos	Free	24 December 2025	
MF	(Brazil) Raí	(Brazil) Botafogo	Free	24 December 2025	
MF	(Brazil) Patryck	(Brazil) São Paulo FC	Loan	26 December 2025	
MF	(Brazil) Ray Breno	(Brazil) Vasco da Gama	Loan	26 December 2025	
FW	(Brazil) Alisson Safira	(Portugal) Santa Clara	Undisclosed	26 December 2025	
MF	(Brazil) Léo Índio	(Brazil) Ponte Preta		1 January 2026	
MF	(Brazil) Raí Ramos	(Brazil) Grêmio Novorizontino		1 January 2026	
FW	(Uruguay) Manuel Castro	(Uruguay) Liverpool	Free	7 January 2026	
MF	(Brazil) Lucas Mineiro	(Brazil) Cuiabá	Loan	8 January 2026	
DF	(Senegal) Iba Ly	(Brazil) São Paulo	Loan	8 January 2026	
DF	(Brazil) Marcos Paulo	(Brazil) Nova Iguaçu	Undisclosed	8 January 2026	
FW	(Portugal) Marcos Paulo	(Brazil) Boavista	Undisclosed	13 January 2026	
MF	(Brazil) Pablo Roberto	(Brazil) Fortaleza	Loan	16 January 2026	
DF	(Brazil) Gabriel Barbosa Pinheiro	(Brazil) Volta Redonda	Loan	21 January 2026	
MF	(Brazil) Davi Góes	(Brazil) Palmeiras U20	Loan return	27 January 2026	
MF	(Brazil) Nathan Santos	(Brazil) Santos	Loan	30 January 2026	
FW	(Brazil) Fábio Lima	(Bulgaria) Levski Sofia	Free	23 February 2026	
FW	(Brazil) Alan Kardec	Unattached		27 February 2026	
DF	(Brazil) Wadson	(Brazil) Anapolina	Loan	7 March 2026	
DF	(Brazil) Titi	(Brazil) Goiás	Free	13 March 2026	
MF	(Brazil) Luan Martins Gonçalves	(Brazil) Primavera	Loan	16 March 2026	
MF	(Brazil) Allanzinho	(Brazil) Fortaleza	Loan	18 March 2026	
MF	(Brazil) Diogo Barbosa	(Brazil) Fortaleza	Free	8 April 2026	
FW	(Brazil) Lucas Alves	(Brazil) Figueirense		3 July 2026	
FW	(Paraguay) Luis Amarilla	(Paraguay) Cerro Porteño	Loan	29 July 2026	
MF	(Brazil) Gabriel Pires	(Brazil) Mirassol	Free	30 July 2026	
FW	(Brazil) Juan Christian	(Latvia) Riga FC	Loan	5 September 2026	
FW	(Brazil) Ênio	(Brazil) Chapecoense	Loan return	9 September 2026	

=== Out ===
Pos.	Player	Transferred to	Fee	Date	Source
DF	(Brazil) Natã	(Brazil) Atlético Goianiense	Loan	30 December 2025	
MF	(Brazil) Edison Negueba	(Brazil) Maringá	Loan return	31 December 2025	
DF	(Brazil) Ewerthon	(Brazil) Sport Recife	Loan return	31 December 2025	
DF	(Brazil) Luan Freitas	(Brazil) Fluminense	Loan return	31 December 2025	
MF	(Brazil) Marcelo Hermes	(Brazil) Criciúma	Loan return	31 December 2025	
MF	(Brazil) Peixoto	(Brazil) Rio Claro	Loan return	31 December 2025	
MF	(Argentina) Juan Sforza	(Brazil) Vasco da Gama	Loan return	31 December 2025	
DF	(Venezuela) Wilker Ángel			1 January 2026	
MF	(Brazil) Caíque	(Brazil) Vitória	Free	1 January 2026	
GK	(Uruguay) Gastón Guruceaga	(Brazil) Náutico	Free	1 January 2026	
DF	(Brazil) Reginaldo	(Brazil) Náutico	Free	1 January 2026	
MF	(Brazil) Jadson	(Brazil) Athletico Paranaense	Undisclosed	3 January 2026	
MF	(Colombia) Daniel Giraldo	(Colombia) Deportivo Cali	Free	9 January 2026	
FW	(Brazil) Ênio	(Brazil) Chapecoense	Loan	10 January 2026	
FW	(Brazil) Nenê	(Brazil) Botafogo da Paraíba	Free	10 January 2026	
DF	(Brazil) Igor Formiga	(Brazil) Mirassol	Undisclosed	16 January 2026	
FW	(Brazil) Gilberto	(Brazil) Londrina	Free	16 January 2026	
FW	(Brazil) Rafael Bilú	(Brazil) Avaí	Free	30 January 2026	
FW	(Brazil) Giovanny	(China) Yanbian Longding	Free	5 February 2026	
MF	(Brazil) Guilherme Luiz Teixeira	(Hungary) Zalaegerszegi TE	Undisclosed	13 February 2026	
FW	(Brazil) Marlon Santos Teodoro	(Hungary) Zalaegerszegi TE FC II	Undisclosed	15 February 2026	
FW	(Brazil) Matheus Babi	(South Korea) Suwon FC	Free	20 February 2026	
MF	(Brazil) Abner	(Latvia) Riga FC	Loan	12 March 2026	
MF	(Brazil) Lucas Fernandes	(Brazil) São Bernardo	Undisclosed	12 March 2026	
FW	(Brazil) Juan Christian	(Latvia) Riga FC	Undisclosed	13 March 2026	
FW	(Brazil) Gabriel Taliari	(Brazil) Remo	R$ 4 million	18 March 2026	
FW	(Brazil) Emerson Galego	(Brazil) Figueirense	Loan	27 March 2026	
MF	(Brazil) Léo Índio	(Brazil) Ponte Preta	Contract terminated	25 June 2026	
MF	(Brazil) João Trevisol	(Brazil) APAFUT	Loan	4 August 2026	
FW	(Brazil) Ênio	(Saudi Arabia) Al-Jabalain	Loan	12 September 2026	

== Overall record ==
Competition	First match	Last match	Starting round	Final position	Record							
Competition	First match	Last match	Starting round	Final position	Pld	W	D	L	GF	GA	GD	Win %
Campeonato Brasileiro Série B	22 March 2026		Matchday 1		38	20	11	7	51	26	+25	52.63
Campeonato Gaúcho	10 January 2026	22 February 2026	Qualifying phase	Semi-finals	9	4	5	0	13	7	+6	44.44
Copa do Brasil	5 March 2026	4 August 2026	Second round	Round of 16	7	3	2	2	12	4	+8	42.86
Copa Sul-Sudeste	25 March 2026	6 May 2026	Group stage	Group stage	6	1	1	4	4	9	−5	16.67
Total					60	28	19	13	80	46	+34	46.67

Last updated: 11 October 2026
Source: Competitions

== Série B ==
Pos	Team	Pld	W	D	L	GF	GA	GD	Pts	Promotion or relegation
1	Novorizontino (C, P)	38	21	10	7	67	32	+35	73	Promotion to 2027 Campeonato Brasileiro Série A
2	Juventude (P)	38	20	11	7	51	26	+25	71	Promotion to 2027 Campeonato Brasileiro Série A
3	Vila Nova	38	19	9	10	53	39	+14	66	Advance to the promotion play-offs
4	Fortaleza	38	17	14	7	45	33	+12	65	Advance to the promotion play-offs
5	Criciúma	38	18	8	12	38	32	+6	62	Advance to the promotion play-offs

Source: CBF
Rules for classification: 1) points; 2) wins; 3) goal difference; 4) goals scored; 5) head-to-head results (only between 2 teams); 6) fewest red cards; 7) fewest yellow cards; 8) drawing of lots.
(C) Champions; (P) Promoted

Overall								Home						Away					
Pld	W	D	L	GF	GA	GD	Pts	W	D	L	GF	GA	GD	W	D	L	GF	GA	GD
33	17	9	7	39	23	+16	60	10	5	2	24	8	+16	7	4	5	15	15	0

Round	1	2	3	4	5	6	7	8	9	10	11	12	13	14	15	16	17	18	19	20	21	22	23	24	25	26	27	28	29	30	31	32	33	34
Ground	A	H	A	H	A	H	A	H	A	H	H	A	H	A	H	A	H	H	A	H	A	H	A	H	A	H	A	H	A	A	H	A	H	A
Result	L	D	L	W	W	W	D	D	D	L	W	L	W	W	W	D	W	W	L	W	W	D	W	W	D	D	W	L	L	W	W	W	D	
Position	19	17	19	15	11	5	7	9	10	12	10	11	8	6	5	6	5	2	4	2	2	2	2	1	1	1	1	2	4	2	2	1	3	

A = Away; H = Home; W = Win; D = Draw; L = Loss

22 March 2026 1	Avaí	2–0	Juventude
16:00 UTC−3	Avenatti 37'; França 75'

31 March 2026 2	Juventude	0–0	Novorizontino
18:30 UTC−3

4 April 2026 3	Fortaleza	2–1	Juventude
16:00 UTC−3	Maílton 18' (pen.); Luan Martins 45+2' (o.g.)		Alan Kardec 50'

11 April 2026 4	Juventude	2–0	Goiás
16:00 UTC−3	Luiz Felipe 39' (o.g.); Alan Kardec 60'		Rodrigo Soares (red card) 43'; García (red card) 55'

18 April 2026 5	CRB	0–1	Juventude
20:45 UTC−3	Hereda (red card) 64'		Allanzinho 40'

25 April 2026 6	Juventude	1–0	Londrina
21:00 UTC−3	M. Paulo 45'

3 May 2026 7	Atlético Goianiense	0–0	Juventude
18:30 UTC−3	Igor Henrique (red card) 85'

9 May 2026 8	Juventude	0–0	Criciúma
21:15 UTC−3

17 May 2026 9	Athletic	1–1	Juventude
16:00 UTC−3	Vera 28'		Raí 90+3'

23 May 2026 10	Juventude	0–1	Sport
20:30 UTC−3			Iury Castilho 82'

29 May 2026 11	Juventude	3–0	América Mineiro
21:00 UTC−3	Raí 8'; Safira 67'; Wadson 90+2'

5 June 2026 12	Operário Ferroviário	2–1	Juventude
20:00 UTC−3	Pablo 42'; Boschilia 90+5' (pen.)		Raí 50'

14 June 2026 13	Juventude	3–0	Ponte Preta
11:00 UTC−3	M. Paulo 14', 30'; Fábio Lima 53'		Palacios (yellow card) 41' (yellow-red card) 65'

21 June 2026 14	São Bernardo	0–1	Juventude
17:00 UTC−3			Safira 66'

28 June 2026 15	Juventude	2–0	Ceará
16:00 UTC−3	Safira 26'; Gabriel Pinheiro 34'

5 July 2026 16	Náutico	0–0	Juventude
20:30 UTC−3

10 July 2026 17	Juventude	1–0	Vila Nova
19:00 UTC−3	Messias 45'

17 July 2026 18	Juventude	2–0	Cuiabá
19:00 UTC−3	Safira 32'; Raí 71'

23 July 2026 19	Botafogo-SP	4–2	Juventude
21:30 UTC−3	Vilar 16'; Wesley Pinheiro 32', 58'; Arthur Caíke 49'		Patryck 55'; Pablo Roberto 70'

28 July 2026 20	Juventude	1–0	Avaí
19:30 UTC−3	Lucas Alves 90+3'

9 August 2026 21	Novorizontino	0–1	Juventude
16:00 UTC−3			Raí 54'

15 August 2026 22	Juventude	0–0	Fortaleza
18:30 UTC−3

18 August 2026 23	Goiás	0–1	Juventude
21:35 UTC−3			Fábio Lima 88'

25 August 2026 24	Juventude	2–1	CRB
19:30 UTC−3	Safira 67' (pen.); Alan Kardec 80'		Thiaguinho 45+1'

1 September 2026 25	Londrina	0–0	Juventude
19:30 UTC−3

5 September 2026 26	Juventude	2–2	Atlético Goianiense
18:00 UTC−3	Safira 36'; Mandaca 45'		Gustavo Coutinho 18'; João Pedro 88'

8 September 2026 27	Criciúma	0–2	Juventude
21:00 UTC−3			Alan Kardec 65'; Ma. Paulo 76'

13 September 2026 28	Juventude	0–2	Athletic
18:00 UTC−3			Aponzá 70' (pen.); Kauan Lindes 90+7'

19 September 2026 29	Sport	2–1	Juventude
16:30 UTC−3

28 September 2026 30	América Mineiro	0–1	Juventude
19:30 UTC−3

2 October 2026 31	Juventude	3–0	Operário Ferroviário
20:45 UTC−3

6 October 2026 32	Ponte Preta	0–2	Juventude
20:35 UTC−3

11 October 2026 33	Juventude	2–2	São Bernardo
16:00 UTC−3

17 October 2026 34	Ceará	v	Juventude	Fortaleza
16:30 UTC−3				Stadium: Arena Castelão; Referee: Kleber Ariel Gonçalves Silva

== Campeonato Gaúcho ==
=== Qualifying phase ===
Round	1	2	3	4	5	6
Ground	H	A	A	H	H	A
Result	D	D	W	W	W	D
Position	2	3	2	2	2	2

A = Away; H = Home; W = Win; D = Draw; L = Loss

10 January 2026 1	Juventude	1–1	Ypiranga
16:00 UTC−3

14 January 2026 2	Novo Hamburgo	1–1	Juventude
19:00 UTC−3

17 January 2026 3	Inter de Santa Maria	0–1	Juventude
16:30 UTC−3

22 January 2026 4	Juventude	1–0	Caxias
19:00 UTC−3

25 January 2026 5	Juventude	3–0	Monsoon
18:00 UTC−3

31 January 2026 6	Grêmio	1–1	Juventude
16:30 UTC−3

=== Knockout stage ===
9 February 2026 Quarter-finals	Juventude	3–2	São José
20:00 UTC−3

15 February 2026 Semi-finals; First leg	Grêmio	1–1	Juventude
17:30 UTC−3

22 February 2026 Semi-finals; Second leg	Juventude	1–1 (1–4 p)	Grêmio
18:00 UTC−3

== Copa do Brasil ==
5 March 2026 Second round	Juventude (Rio Grande do Sul)	5–0	(Rondônia) Guaporé
21:30 UTC−3

12 March 2026 Third round	Tuna Luso (Pará)	1–1 (1–4 p)	(Rio Grande do Sul) Juventude
21:30 UTC−3

19 March 2026 Fourth round	Juventude (Rio Grande do Sul)	3–0	(Pará) Águia de Marabá
19:30 UTC−3

=== Fifth round ===
21 April 2026 First leg	São Paulo (São Paulo (state))	1–0	(Rio Grande do Sul) Juventude
19:15 UTC−3

13 May 2026 Second leg	Juventude (Rio Grande do Sul)	3–1 (3–2 agg.)	(São Paulo (state)) São Paulo
19:00 UTC−3

=== Round of 16 ===
1 August 2026 First leg	Atlético Mineiro (Minas Gerais)	0–0	(Rio Grande do Sul) Juventude
19:30 UTC−3

4 August 2026 Second leg	Juventude (Rio Grande do Sul)	0–1 (0–1 agg.)	(Minas Gerais) Atlético Mineiro
19:30 UTC−3

== Copa Sul-Sudeste ==
Round	1	2	3	4	5	6
Ground	A	H	A	H	A	H
Result	L	L	L	D	L	W
Position						

A = Away; H = Home; W = Win; D = Draw; L = Loss

25 March 2026 1	Sampaio Corrêa (Rio de Janeiro (state))	2–0	(Rio Grande do Sul) Juventude
18:00 UTC−3

28 March 2026 2	Juventude (Rio Grande do Sul)	0–2	(São Paulo (state)) Novorizontino
20:30 UTC−3

8 April 2026 3	Caxias (Rio Grande do Sul)	1–0	(Rio Grande do Sul) Juventude
18:00 UTC−3

15 April 2026 4	Juventude (Rio Grande do Sul)	0–0	(Santa Catarina (state)) Chapecoense
21:15 UTC−3

30 April 2026 5	Cianorte (Paraná (state))	3–2	(Rio Grande do Sul) Juventude
20:00 UTC−3

6 May 2026 6	Juventude (Rio Grande do Sul)	2–1	(Minas Gerais) Tombense
21:30 UTC−3
