= 2025 Botafogo FR season =

Botafogo
2025 season
- SAF Owner: John Textor (100%)
- President: Durcesio Mello
- Manager: Renato Paiva (28 February–29 June); Davide Ancelotti (from 9 July)
- Stadium: Estádio Nilton Santos
- Campeonato Brasileiro Série A: 6th
- Campeonato Carioca: 9th
- Copa do Brasil: Quarter-finals
- Supercopa do Brasil: Runner-up
- Copa Libertadores: Round of 16
- Recopa Sudamericana: Runner-up
- FIFA Club World Cup: Round of 16
- Average home league attendance: 16,905
Home colours	Away colours	Third colours

The 2025 season was the 101st year of competition for Botafogo de Futebol e Regatas, a Brazilian football club based in Rio de Janeiro. The team competed in the Série A, Campeonato Carioca, Copa do Brasil, Copa Libertadores, Recopa Sudamericana, and, for the first time, the Supercopa do Brasil and FIFA Club World Cup. Botafogo were the reigning champions of the Copa Libertadores.

== Squad ==
=== First team squad ===
As of 27 July 2025.

Note: Flags indicate national team as defined under FIFA eligibility rules; some limited exceptions apply. Players may hold more than one non-FIFA nationality.

No.	Pos.	Nation	Player
1	GK	BRA	Raul
2	DF	BRA	Vitinho
4	DF	URU	Mateo Ponte
5	MF	BRA	Danilo Barbosa
6	MF	BRA	Patrick de Paula
7	FW	BRA	Artur
8	MF	ARG	Álvaro Montoro
9	FW	BRA	Rwan Cruz
10	MF	VEN	Jefferson Savarino
11	FW	BRA	Matheus Martins
12	GK	BRA	John
13	DF	BRA	Alex Telles
14	MF	COL	Jordan Barrera
15	DF	ANG	Bastos
16	FW	BRA	Nathan Fernandes
17	MF	BRA	Marlon Freitas (captain)
18	MF	BRA	Kauê
19	FW	BRA	Kayke
20	DF	ARG	Alexander Barboza

No.	Pos.	Nation	Player
21	DF	BRA	Marçal
23	MF	URU	Santiago Rodríguez
24	GK	BRA	Léo Linck
25	MF	BRA	Allan
28	MF	BRA	Newton
30	FW	ARG	Joaquín Correa
31	DF	BRA	Kaio Pantaleão
35	MF	BRA	Danilo
39	FW	URU	Gonzalo Mastriani (on loan from Athletico-PR)
40	GK	ECU	Cristhian Loor
42	GK	BRA	Cristiano
47	FW	BRA	Jeffinho
57	DF	BRA	David Ricardo
63	DF	BRA	Serafim
66	DF	BRA	Cuiabano
67	FW	BRA	Yarlen
69	FW	BRA	Rafael Lobato
77	MF	BRA	Kauan Lindes
98	FW	BRA	Arthur Cabral

=== Transfers In ===
Pos.	Player	Transferred from	Fee	Date	Source
MF	(Brazil) Luís Oyama	(Brazil) Juventude	Loan return	31 December 2024	
DF	(Ecuador) Luis Segovia	(Brazil) CRB	Loan return	31 December 2024	
MF	(Brazil) Patrick de Paula	(Brazil) Criciúma	Loan return	31 December 2024	
MF	(Brazil) Raí	(Brazil) CRB	Loan return	31 December 2024	
MF	(Brazil) Breno	(Brazil) São Bernardo	Loan return	31 December 2024	
MF	(Brazil) Emerson Urso	(Brazil) Vila Nova	Loan return	31 December 2024	
MF	(Brazil) Chay	(Brazil) CRB	Loan return	31 December 2024	
MF	(Uruguay) Diego Hernández	(Mexico) León	Loan return	31 December 2024	
DF	(Brazil) Philipe Sampaio	(Brazil) Atlético Goianiense	Loan return	31 December 2024	
DF	(Brazil) Daniel Borges	(Brazil) América Mineiro	Loan return	31 December 2024	
FW	(Uruguay) Valentín Adamo	(Chile) Unión Española	Loan return	31 December 2024	
MF	(Brazil) Newton	(Brazil) Criciúma	Loan return	31 December 2024	
MF	(Brazil) Gustavo Sauer	(Brazil) Cuiabá	Loan return	31 December 2024	
MF	(Brazil) Jeffinho	(France) Lyon	€5,300,000	3 January 2025	
FW	(Brazil) Artur	(Russia) Zenit Saint Petersburg	€10,000,000	19 January 2025	
GK	(Brazil) Léo Linck	(Brazil) Athletico Paranaense	€1,700,000	29 January 2025	
DF	(Brazil) Jair	(Brazil) Santos	€10,000,000	10 February 2025	
FW	(Brazil) Nathan Fernandes	(Brazil) Grêmio	Undisclosed	14 February 2025	
MF	(Uruguay) Santiago Rodríguez	(United States) New York City FC	Undisclosed	22 February 2025	
DF	(Brazil) Marçal	Unattached	Free	26 March 2025	
FW	(Uruguay) Gonzalo Mastriani	(Brazil) Athletico Paranaense	Loan	31 March 2025	
MF	(Brazil) Raí	(Brazil) Boavista	Loan return	10 April 2025	
MF	(Argentina) Álvaro Montoro	(Argentina) Vélez Sarsfield	US€9,000,000	3 June 2025	
DF	(Brazil) Kaio Fernando	(Russia) Krasnodar	€2,000,000	5 June 2025	
GK	(Ecuador) Cristhian Loor	(Ecuador) Independiente del Valle	Undisclosed	7 June 2025	
FW	(Brazil) Arthur Cabral	(Portugal) Benfica	€15,000,000	8 June 2025	
FW	(Argentina) Joaquín Correa	(Italy) Inter Milan	Free	10 June 2025	
MF	(Paraguay) Matías Segovia	(United Arab Emirates) Al Ain	Loan return	30 June 2025	
MF	(Argentina) Thiago Almada	(France) Olympique Lyonnais	Loan return	30 June 2025	
MF	(Colombia) Jordan Barrera	(Colombia) Junior Barranquilla	US$4,000,000	17 July 2025	
MF	(Brazil) Danilo	(England) Nottingham Forest	€22,000,000	18 July 2025	
GK	(Brazil) Neto	(England) Bournemouth	Undisclosed	8 August 2025	
FW	(Spain) Chris Ramos	(Spain) Cádiz	Loan	15 August 2025	
DF	(Brazil) Gabriel Bahia	(Brazil) Volta Redonda	Loan	26 August 2025	

=== Transfers Out ===
Pos.	Player	Transferred to	Fee	Date	Source
DF	(Brazil) Pablo	(Brazil) Flamengo	End of loan	31 December 2024	
MF	(Paraguay) Óscar Romero	(Brazil) Internacional	Released	31 December 2024	
GK	(Brazil) Gabriel Toebe Studt	(Brazil) Avenida		31 December 2024	
MF	(Brazil) Emerson Urso	(Brazil) Vila Nova	Released	31 December 2024	
MF	(Brazil) Chay	(Brazil) Volta Redonda	Released	31 December 2024	
DF	(Brazil) Rafael	Retired	End of contract	31 December 2024	
DF	(Brazil) Marçal		End of contract	31 December 2024	
GK	(Paraguay) Gatito Fernández	(Paraguay) Cerro Porteño	End of contract	31 December 2024	
MF	(Brazil) Tchê Tchê	(Brazil) Vasco da Gama	End of contract	31 December 2024	
MF	(Brazil) Eduardo	(Brazil) Cruzeiro	End of contract	31 December 2024	
DF	(Brazil) Daniel Borges	(Brazil) Mirassol	Free	3 January 2025	
DF	(Brazil) Hugo	(Brazil) Vitória	Loan	7 January 2025	
MF	(Brazil) Raí	(Brazil) Boavista	Loan	10 January 2025	
MF	(Argentina) Thiago Almada	(France) Olympique Lyonnais	Loan	15 January 2025	
MF	(Brazil) Luiz Henrique	(Russia) Zenit Saint Petersburg	€33,000,000	20 January 2025	
FW	(Brazil) Tiquinho Soares	(Brazil) Santos	Undisclosed	24 January 2025	
FW	(Uruguay) Valentín Adamo	(Uruguay) Boston River	Loan	30 January 2025	
FW	(Brazil) Matheus Nascimento	(United States) LA Galaxy	Loan	19 February 2025	
MF	(Brazil) Raí	(Brazil) Volta Redonda	Loan	11 April 2025	
DF	(Brazil) Hugo	(United Arab Emirates) Al Wasl	Undisclosed	1 July 2025	
FW	(Brazil) Igor Jesus	(England) Nottingham Forest	£10,000,000	5 July 2025	
DF	(Brazil) Jair	(England) Nottingham Forest	€12,000,000	11 July 2025	
MF	(Argentina) Thiago Almada	(Spain) Atlético Madrid	€21,000,000	17 July 2025	
MF	(Uruguay) Diego Hernández	(Brazil) Remo	Loan	22 July 2025	
FW	(Brazil) Elias Manoel	(Portugal) Santa Clara	Loan	26 July 2025	
MF	(Brazil) Yarlen	(Portugal) Tondela	Loan	28 July 2025	
MF	(Brazil) Patrick de Paula	(Portugal) Estoril	Loan	29 July 2025	
MF	(Paraguay) Matías Segovia	(Belgium) RWDM Brussels	Loan	30 July 2025	
FW	(Brazil) Rwan Cruz	(United States) Real Salt Lake	Loan	1 August 2025	
MF	(Brazil) Danilo Barbosa	(Saudi Arabia) Al-Ula	Undisclosed	2 August 2025	
FW	(Brazil) Kayke	(Brazil) Fortaleza	Loan	29 August 2025	
GK	(Brazil) John	(England) Nottingham Forest	€9,000,000	31 August 2025	
DF	(Brazil) Cuiabano	(England) Nottingham Forest	€6,000,000	1 September 2025	

== Friendlies ==
22 March 2025 Friendly	Botafogo (Brazil)	3–1	(Brazil) Novorizontino

== Competitions ==
=== Overall record ===
Competition	First match	Last match	Starting round	Final position	Record							
Competition	First match	Last match	Starting round	Final position	Pld	W	D	L	GF	GA	GD	Win %
Campeonato Brasileiro Série A	30 March 2025	7 December 2025	Matchday 1	6th	38	17	12	9	58	38	+20	44.74
Campeonato Carioca	11 January 2025	23 February 2025	Taça Guanabara	9th	11	4	1	6	11	12	−1	36.36
Copa do Brasil	30 April 2025	11 September 2025	Third round	Quarter-finals	6	3	2	1	9	3	+6	50.00
Supercopa do Brasil	2 February 2025		Final	Runner-up	1	0	0	1	1	3	−2	0.00
Copa Libertadores	2 April 2025	21 August 2025	Group stage	Round of 16	8	5	0	3	9	7	+2	62.50
Recopa Sudamericana	20 February 2025	27 February 2025	Final	Runner-up	2	0	0	2	0	4	−4	0.00
FIFA Club World Cup	15 June 2025	28 June 2025	Group stage	Round of 16	4	2	0	2	3	3	+0	50.00
Total					70	31	15	24	91	70	+21	44.29

Source: Competitions

=== Campeonato Brasileiro Série A ===
==== League table ====
Pos	Team	Pld	W	D	L	GF	GA	GD	Pts	Qualification or relegation
4	Mirassol	38	18	13	7	63	39	+24	67	Qualification for Copa Libertadores group stage (Note: Flamengo qualified for the Copa Libertadores group stage by winning the 2025 Copa Libertadores.)
5	Fluminense	38	19	7	12	50	39	+11	64	Qualification for Copa Libertadores group stage
6	Botafogo	38	17	12	9	58	38	+20	63	Qualification for Copa Libertadores second stage
7	Bahia	38	17	9	12	50	47	+3	60	Qualification for Copa Libertadores second stage
8	São Paulo	38	14	9	15	43	47	−4	51	Qualification for Copa Sudamericana group stage

Source: CBF
Rules for classification: 1) points; 2) wins; 3) goal difference; 4) goals scored; 5) head-to-head results (only between two teams); 6) fewest red cards; 7) fewest yellow cards; 8) drawing of lots.

==== Matches ====
30 March 2025 1	Palmeiras	0–0	Botafogo	São Paulo
16:00 UTC−3		Report		Stadium: Allianz Parque; Attendance: 30,347; Referee: Ramon Abatti Abel (Santa Catarina)

5 April 2025 2	Botafogo	2–0	Juventude	Rio de Janeiro
21:00 UTC−3	Igor Jesus 24'; Ponte 62'	Report		Stadium: Estádio Olímpico Nilton Santos; Referee: Rodrigo José Pereira de Lima

12 April 2025 3	Red Bull Bragantino	1–0	Botafogo	Bragança Paulista
17:00 UTC−3	Sasha 5'	Report		Stadium: Estádio Nabi Abi Chedid

17 April 2025 4	Botafogo	2–2	São Paulo	Rio de Janeiro
19:00 UTC−3	Savarino 24'; Igor Jesus 84'	Report	Ferreira 21'; André Silva 45+13'	Stadium: Estádio Nilton Santos; Referee: Davi de Oliveira Lacerda

20 April 2025 5	Atlético Mineiro	1–0	Botafogo	Belo Horizonte
16:00 UTC−3	Cuello 48'	Report		Stadium: Mineirão; Referee: Ramon Abatti Abel

26 April 2025 6	Botafogo	2–0	Fluminense	Rio de Janeiro
21:00 UTC−3	Vitinho 37'; Savarino 90+5'	Report		Stadium: Estádio Nilton Santos

3 May 2025 7	Bahia	1–0	Botafogo	Salvador
21:00 (UTC-3)	Cauly 39'	Report		Stadium: Arena Fonte Nova

11 May 2025 8	Botafogo	4–0	Internacional	Rio de Janeiro
20:00	Igor Jesus 9'; Artur 44'; Cuiabano 54'; Alex Telles 69'	Report		Stadium: Nilton Santos; Attendance: 7,800; Referee: Matheus Delgado Candançan

18 May 2025 9	Flamengo	0–0	Botafogo	Rio de Janeiro
18:30 UTC−3		Report		Stadium: Maracanã; Attendance: 54,238; Referee: Bruno Arleu de Araújo

1 June 2025 11	Santos	0–1	Botafogo	Santos
16:00 UTC-03:00		Report	86' Artur	Stadium: Vila Belmiro; Attendance: 13,787; Referee: Davi de Oliveira Lacerda

4 June 2025 10	Botafogo	3–2	Ceará	Rio de Janeiro
20:00 UTC-03:00	Mastriani 45'; Alex Telles 72' (pen.); Marlon Freitas 87'	Report	Pedro Raul 57', 87'	Stadium: Nilton Santos; Attendance: 22,800; Referee: Edina Alves Batista
Note: The match, originally scheduled for 24 May, was postponed owing to security concerns.

12 July 2025 13	Vasco da Gama	0–2	Botafogo	Brasília
18:30 UTC−3		Report	Cabral 48'; Fernandes 78'	Stadium: Estádio Nacional Mané Garrincha; Attendance: 31,468; Referee: Anderson Daronco

16 July 2025 14	Botafogo	0–0	Vitória	Rio de Janeiro
21:30 UTC-03:00		Report		Stadium: Nilton Santos; Attendance: 19,733; Referee: Lucas Casagrande

20 July 2025 15	Sport	0–1	Botafogo	Recife
17:30 UTC−3			Cuiabano 90+1'	Stadium: Estádio Ilha do Retiro; Attendance: 11,609; Referee: Flavio Rodrigues de Souza

26 July 2025 17	Botafogo	1–1	Corinthians	Rio de Janeiro
21:30 UTC-03:00	Cabral 24'	Report	Depay 83'	Stadium: Nilton Santos; Referee: Rodrigo José Pereira de Lima

3 August 2025 18	Botafogo	0–2	Cruzeiro	Rio de Janeiro
16:00 UTC−3		Report	Christian 23'; Matheus Pereira 41'	Stadium: Nilton Santos; Attendance: 35,126; Referee: Matheus Delgado Candançan

9 August 2025 19	Fortaleza	0–5	Botafogo	Fortaleza
20:30 (UTC-3)		Report	Marçal 14', 48'; Cabral 45+5'; David Ricardo 53'; Matheus Martins 90+3'	Stadium: Estádio Governador Plácido Castelo (Castelão)

17 August 2025 20	Botafogo	0–1	Palmeiras	Rio de Janeiro
20:30 UTC−3		Report	Felipe Anderson 45'	Stadium: Nilton Santos; Attendance: 16,469; Referee: Davi de Oliveira Lacerda

24 August 2025 21	Juventude	1–3	Botafogo	Caxias do Sul
18:30 UTC−3	Batalla 30'	Report	Alex Telles 39' (pen.); Ramos 83', 90+2'	Stadium: Estádio Alfredo Jaconi; Referee: Flavio Rodrigues de Souza

30 August 2025 22	Botafogo	4–1	Red Bull Bragantino	Rio de Janeiro
18:30 UTC−3	Danilo 6'; Newton 33'; Savarino 45+2'; Montoro 90+2'	Report	Jhon Jhon 15'	Stadium: Nilton Santos; Attendance: 13,168

14 September 2025 23	São Paulo	1–0	Botafogo	São Paulo
17:30 UTC−3	Dinenno 7'	Report		Stadium: Morumbi; Attendance: 38,713; Referee: Wilton Pereira Sampaio

17 September 2025 12	Botafogo	3–3	Mirassol	Rio de Janeiro
19:30 UTC−3	Savarino 12'; Ramos 31'; Montoro 40'	Report	Chico 46'; Jemmes 58'; Lucas Ramon 61'	Stadium: Estádio Nilton Santos; Attendance: 6,724

20 September 2025 24	Botafogo	1–0	Atlético Mineiro	Rio de Janeiro
18:30 UTC−3	Santiago Rodríguez 48'	Report		Stadium: Estádio Nilton Santos; Attendance: 11,816; Referee: Flávio Rodrigues de Souza

24 September 2025 16	Grêmio	1–1	Botafogo	Porto Alegre
19:30 UTC−3	Volpi 90' (pen.)	Report	Cuiabano 53'	Stadium: Arena do Grêmio; Attendance: 18,551; Referee: Lucas Paulo Torezin

28 September 2025 25	Fluminense	2–0	Botafogo	Rio de Janeiro
16:00 UTC−3	Cano 33'; Lucas Lima 89'	Report		Stadium: Maracanã

1 October 2025 26	Botafogo	2–1	Bahia	Rio de Janeiro
21:30 (UTC-3)	Rodríguez 27'; Jeffinho 46'	Report	Rodrigo Nestor 55'	Stadium: Estádio Nilton Santos (Engenhão)

4 October 2025 27	Internacional	2–0	Botafogo	Porto Alegre
18:30	Alan Patrick 9'; Vitinho 50'	Report		Stadium: Beira-Rio; Attendance: 20,805; Referee: Flávio Rodrigues de Souza

15 October 2025 28	Botafogo	0–3	Flamengo	Rio de Janeiro
19:30 UTC−3		Report	Pedro 40'; L. Araújo 70'; Plata 80'	Stadium: Nilton Santos; Attendance: 22,635; Referee: Alex Gomes Stefano

19 October 2025 29	Ceará	0–2	Botafogo	Fortaleza
18:30		Report	Ramos 39'; Jeffinho 78'	Stadium: Castelão; Attendance: 30,021; Referee: Davi de Oliveira Lacerda

26 October 2025 30	Botafogo	2–2	Santos	Rio de Janeiro
16:00 UTC-03:00	Correa 1', 39'	Report	Souza 26'; Barreal 70' (pen.)	Stadium: Estádio Nilton Santos; Attendance: 20,533; Referee: Rodrigo José Pereira de Lima

1 November 2025 31	Mirassol	0–0	Botafogo	Mirassol
18:00		Report		Stadium: Estádio José Maria de Campos Maia; Attendance: 5,145

5 November 2025 32	Botafogo	3–0	Vasco da Gama	Rio de Janeiro
19:30 UTC-03:00	Alex Telles 45+2' (pen.); Artur 72'; Jardim 77' (o.g.)	Report		Stadium: Estádio Nilton Santos

9 November 2025 33	Vitória	0–0	Botafogo	Salvador
19:00 (UTC-3)		Report		Stadium: Estádio Manoel Barradas (Barradão); Attendance: 28,264; Referee: Anderson Daronco

18 November 2025 34	Botafogo	3–2	Sport	Rio de Janeiro
20:30 (UTC-3)	Artur 30'; Barría 58', 90+5'	Report	Léo Pereira 14'; Rafael Thyere 28'	Stadium: Estádio Olímpico Nilton Santos (Engenhão); Attendance: 12,120; Referee: Bruno Pereira Vasconcelos

22 November 2025 35	Botafogo	3–2	Grêmio	Rio de Janeiro
19:30 UTC−3	Cuiabano 15'; Artur 19'; Marçal 83'	Report	André 49'; Carlos Vinícius 90'	Stadium: Estádio Nilton Santos; Attendance: 16,755; Referee: Felipe Fernandes de Lima

30 November 2025 36	Corinthians	2–2	Botafogo	São Paulo
16:00 UTC−3	Raniele 7'; Gustavo Henrique 82'	Report	Cuiabano 60'; Barrera 66'	Stadium: Neo Química Arena; Attendance: 37,959; Referee: Jonathan Benkenstein Pinheiro

4 December 2025 37	Cruzeiro	2–2	Botafogo	Belo Horizonte
19:30 UTC−3	Christian 15'; Matheus Pereira 50'	Report	Marçal 57'; Alex Telles 90+5' (pen.)	Stadium: Mineirão; Attendance: 34,649; Referee: Anderson Daronco

7 December 2025 38	Botafogo	4–2	Fortaleza	Rio de Janeiro
16:00 (UTC-3)	Montoro 45+5'; Arthur Cabral 48'; Marçal 84'; Ponte 90+5'	Report	Breno Lopes 17'; Bareiro 56' (pen.)	Stadium: Estádio Olímpico Nilton Santos (Engenhão); Attendance: 26,032

=== Campeonato Carioca ===
==== Taça Guanabara ====
===== Taça Guanabara table =====
Pos	Team	Pld	W	D	L	GF	GA	GD	Pts	Qualification
7	Madureira	11	4	3	4	11	8	+3	15	Advance to Taça Rio semi-finals
8	Boavista	11	2	8	1	10	8	+2	14	Advance to Taça Rio semi-finals
9	Botafogo	11	4	1	6	11	12	−1	13	
10	Maricá	11	3	3	5	11	17	−6	12	
11	Portuguesa	11	3	1	7	12	24	−12	10	

Source: FERJ
Rules for classification: 1) points; 2) wins; 3) goal difference; 4) goals scored; 5) head-to-head results; 6) disciplinary record; 7) random draw.

===== Results by round =====
Round	1	2	3	4
Ground	H	H	A	H
Result	L	W	L	
Position	9			

A = Away; H = Home; W = Win; D = Draw; L = Loss

===== Matches =====
11 January 2025 1	Botafogo	1–2	Maricá	Rio de Janeiro
16:00 UTC−3				Stadium: Estádio Nilton Santos; Referee: Bruno Mota Correia

14 January 2025 2	Botafogo	2–0	Portuguesa	Rio de Janeiro
19:30 UTC−3				Stadium: Estádio Nilton Santos

18 January 2025 3	Sampaio Corrêa	2–1	Botafogo	Saquarema
16:30 UTC−3	Rafael de Souza Rodolfo 32'; Guilherme dos Santos Souza 74'; Ryan Silva de Andrade Viana Toledo (red card) 88'; Zé Carlos (red card) 90+8'		Vinicius Lima Serafim 88'	Stadium: Estádio Lourival Gomes de Almeida; Referee: Lucas Neves Borja de Almeida

22 January 2025 4	Botafogo	1–2	Volta Redonda	Rio de Janeiro
21:30 UTC−3				Stadium: Estádio Nilton Santos

26 January 2025 5	Botafogo	2–0	Bangu	Rio de Janeiro
17:00 UTC−3				Stadium: Estádio Nilton Santos

29 January 2025 6	Botafogo	2–1	Fluminense	Rio de Janeiro
21:30 UTC−3				Stadium: Estádio Nilton Santos

6 February 2025 8	Nova Iguaçu	0–1	Botafogo	Rio de Janeiro
20:45 UTC−3				Stadium: Estádio Moça Bonita

9 February 2025 9	Botafogo	0–2	Madureira	Rio de Janeiro
15:00 UTC−3				Stadium: Estádio Nilton Santos

12 February 2025 7 Clássico da Rivalidade	Flamengo	1–0	Botafogo	Rio de Janeiro
21:30 UTC−3	Ortiz 55'	Report		Stadium: Maracanã; Attendance: 33,465; Referee: Bruno Mota Correia

15 February 2025 10	Boavista	1–1	Botafogo	Rio de Janeiro
18:00 UTC−3				Stadium: Estadio Elcyr Resende de Mendonca

23 February 2025 11	Vasco da Gama	1–0	Botafogo	Rio de Janeiro
17:30 UTC−3				Stadium: São Januário

=== Copa do Brasil ===
==== Third round ====
30 April 2025 First leg	Botafogo	4–0	Capital	Rio de Janeiro
19:00 UTC−3	Alex Telles 11' (pen.); Igor Jesus 72' (pen.); Artur 75'; Rwan 90'	Report		Stadium: Estádio Nilton Santos; Referee: Lucas Casagrande

22 May 2025 Second leg	Capital	1–0 (1–4 agg.)	Botafogo	Brasília
21:30 UTC−3	Rodriguinho 30'	Report		Stadium: Estádio Nacional Mané Garrincha; Referee: Bruno Pereira Vasconcelos

==== Round of 16 ====
29 July 2025 First leg	Botafogo	2–0	Red Bull Bragantino	Rio de Janeiro
19:00 UTC−3	Montoro 16'; Barboza 32'	Report		Stadium: Estádio Nilton Santos; Referee: Anderson Daronco

6 August 2025 Second leg	Red Bull Bragantino	0–1 (0–3 agg.)	Botafogo	Bragança Paulista
19:00 UTC−3		Report	Savarino 54'	Stadium: Cícero de Souza Marques; Attendance: 3,876; Referee: Rodrigo José Pereira de Lima

==== Quarter-finals ====
27 August 2025 First leg	Vasco da Gama	1–1	Botafogo	Rio de Janeiro
21:30	Jair 17'	Report	Arthur Cabral 8'	Stadium: São Januário; Attendance: 20,358; Referee: Anderson Daronco

11 September 2025 Second leg	Botafogo	1–1 (2–2 agg.) (3–5 p)	Vasco da Gama	Rio de Janeiro
21:30	Alex Telles 42' (pen.)	Report	Nuno Moreira 20'	Stadium: Nilton Santos; Attendance: 40,649; Referee: Rodrigo José Pereira de Lima (Pernambuco)
	Penalties
	Alex Telles (penalty missed); Marlon Freitas (penalty scored); Matheus Martins (penalty scored); Savarino (penalty scored)		(penalty scored) Vegetti; (penalty scored) Rayan; (penalty scored) Rodríguez; (penalty scored) Matheus França; (penalty scored) Robert Renan

=== Supercopa do Brasil ===
2 February 2025 Final	Botafogo	1–3	Flamengo	Belém
16:00 UTC−3	Patrick de Paula 87'	Report	Bruno Henrique 13' (pen.), 20'; Luiz Araújo 83'	Stadium: Mangueirão; Attendance: 44,952; Referee: Ramon Abatti Abel (Santa Catarina)

=== Copa Libertadores ===
==== Group Stage ====
Pos	Team	Pld	W	D	L	GF	GA	GD	Pts	Qualification	EST	BOT	UCH	CBO
1	(Argentina) Estudiantes	6	4	0	2	11	5	+6	12	Advance to round of 16	—	1–0	1–2	2–0
2	(Brazil) Botafogo	6	4	0	2	8	5	+3	12	Advance to round of 16	3–2	—	1–0	2–0
3	Universidad de Chile	6	3	1	2	8	6	+2	10	Transfer to Copa Sudamericana	0–3	1–0	—	4–0
4	(Venezuela) Carabobo	6	0	1	5	2	13	−11	1		0–2	1–2	1–1	—

Source: CONMEBOL

2 April 2025 1	Universidad de Chile	1–0	(Brazil) Botafogo	Santiago, Chile
21:30 UTC−3	Di Yorio 59'	Report		Stadium: Estadio Nacional Julio Martínez Prádanos; Attendance: 43,316; Referee: Esteban Ostojich (Uruguay)

8 April 2025 2	Botafogo (Brazil)	2–0	(Venezuela) Carabobo	Rio de Janeiro, Brazil
19:00 UTC−3	Patrick 88'; Martins 90+8'	Report		Stadium: Estádio Olímpico Nilton Santos; Referee: Guillermo Guerrero (Ecuador)

23 April 2025 3	Estudiantes (Argentina)	1–0	(Brazil) Botafogo	La Plata, Argentina
21:30 UTC−3	Carrillo 38'	Report		Stadium: Estadio Jorge Luis Hirschi; Referee: Gustavo Tejera (Uruguay)

6 May 2025 4	Carabobo (Venezuela)	1–2	(Brazil) Botafogo	Valencia, Venezuela
18:00 UTC−4	Aponte 76'	Report	Vitinho 22'; Cuiabano 90+1'	Stadium: Estadio Misael Delgado; Referee: Carlos Benítez (Paraguay)

14 May 2025 5	Botafogo (Brazil)	3–2	(Argentina) Estudiantes	Rio de Janeiro, Brazil
21:30 UTC−3	Rwan 42'; Igor Jesus 52'; Artur 85'	Report	Palacios 64' (pen.), 77'	Stadium: Estádio Olímpico Nilton Santos; Referee: Juan Benítez (Paraguay)

27 May 2025 6	Botafogo (Brazil)	1–0	Universidad de Chile	Rio de Janeiro, Brazil
21:30 UTC−3	Igor Jesus 38'	Report		Stadium: Estádio Olímpico Nilton Santos; Referee: Andrés Rojas (Colombia)

==== Final stages ====
The draw for the round of 16 will be held on 2 June 2025, 12:00 PYT (UTC−3) at the CONMEBOL headquarters in Luque, Paraguay.

==== Round of 16 ====
14 August 2025 First leg	Botafogo (Brazil)	1–0	(Ecuador) LDU Quito	Rio de Janeiro, Brazil
19:00 UTC−3	Artur 1'	Report		Stadium: Estádio Olímpico Nilton Santos; Attendance: 37,131; Referee: Wilmar Roldán (Colombia)

21 August 2025 Second leg	LDU Quito (Ecuador)	2–0 (2–1 agg.)	(Brazil) Botafogo	Quito, Ecuador
17:00 UTC−5	Villamíl 7'; Alzugaray 60' (pen.)	Report		Stadium: Estadio Rodrigo Paz Delgado; Attendance: 32,854; Referee: Facundo Tello (Argentina)

=== Recopa Sudamericana ===
20 February 2025 First leg	Racing Club (Argentina)	2–0	(Brazil) Botafogo	Avellaneda, Argentina
21:30 UTC−3	Vietto 31' (pen.); Martínez 63'	Report		Stadium: El Cilindro; Referee: Felipe González (Chile)

27 February 2025 Second leg	Botafogo (Brazil)	0–2	(Argentina) Racing Club	Rio de Janeiro
21:30 UTC−3		Report	Zaracho 50'; Zuculini 69'	Stadium: Estádio Nilton Santos; Referee: Jesús Valenzuela (Venezuela)

=== FIFA Club World Cup ===
==== Group stage ====
Pos	Team	Pld	W	D	L	GF	GA	GD	Pts	Qualification
1	(France) Paris Saint-Germain	3	2	0	1	6	1	+5	6 (Note: Tied on head-to-head points (3). Head-to-head goal difference: Paris Saint-Germain +3, Botafogo 0, Atlético Madrid –3.)	Advance to knockout stage
2	(Brazil) Botafogo	3	2	0	1	3	2	+1	6	Advance to knockout stage
3	(Spain) Atlético Madrid	3	2	0	1	4	5	−1	6	
4	(United States) Seattle Sounders FC	3	0	0	3	2	7	−5	0	

Source: FIFA
Notes:

15 June 2025 1	Botafogo (Brazil)	2–1	(United States) Seattle Sounders FC	Seattle, United States
19:00 UTC−7	Cunha 28'; Igor Jesus 44'; Barboza (yellow card) 61'; Correa (yellow card) 64'	Report	Nouhou (yellow card) 36'; C. Roldan 75'; Ragen (yellow card) 87'	Stadium: Lumen Field; Attendance: 30,151; Referee: Glenn Nyberg (Sweden)

19 June 2025 2	Paris Saint-Germain (France)	0–1	(Brazil) Botafogo	Pasadena, United States
18:00 UTC−7		Report	Igor Jesus 36'; Gregore (yellow card) 57'; Cuiabano (yellow card) 89'	Stadium: Rose Bowl; Attendance: 53,699; Referee: Drew Fischer (Canada)

23 June 2025 3	Atlético Madrid (Spain)	1–0	(Brazil) Botafogo	Pasadena, United States
12:00 UTC−7	Griezmann 87'	Report	Gregore (yellow card) 90+5'	Stadium: Rose Bowl; Attendance: 22,992; Referee: César Ramos (Mexico)

==== Knockout stage ====
28 June 2025 Round of 16	Palmeiras (Brazil)	1–0 (a.e.t.)	(Brazil) Botafogo	Philadelphia, United States
12:00 UTC−4	Gómez (yellow card) 40' (yellow-red card) 116'; Piquerez (yellow card) 86'; Paulinho 100'; Estêvão (yellow card) 105'; Moreno (yellow card) 120+1'; Weverton (yellow card) 120+5'	Report	Barboza (yellow card) 3'; Alex Telles (yellow card) 35'; Artur (yellow card) 65'; Newton (yellow card) 90+4'; Marçal (yellow card) 104'; Montoro (yellow card) 105+3'	Stadium: Lincoln Financial Field; Attendance: 33,657; Referee: François Letexier (France)
