= Gabriel Pinheiro =

Brazilian footballer

- Pinheiro in 2022

Personal information
- Full name: Gabriel Barbosa Pinheiro
- Date of birth: 19 April 1997 (age 29)
- Place of birth: Cachoeiro de Itapemirim, Brazil
- Height: 1.87 m (6 ft 2 in)
- Position: Centre-back

Team information
- Current team: Juventude (on loan from Volta Redonda)
- Number: 97

Youth career
- 2013–2014: Duque de Caxias
- 2015–2017: Americano

Senior career*
Years	Team	Apps	(Gls)
2017–2020	Americano	40	(2)
2020–2021	Boa Esporte	23	(0)
2022–2025	Nova Iguaçu	78	(2)
2024	→ Brusque (loan)	5	(0)
2025–	Volta Redonda	25	(2)
2026–	→ Juventude (loan)	29	(1)
- * Club domestic league appearances and goals as of 17 November 2026

Gabriel Barbosa Pinheiro (born 19 April 1997), known as Gabriel Pinheiro, is a Brazilian footballer who plays as a centre-back for Juventude, on loan from Volta Redonda.

== Career ==
Born in Cachoeiro de Itapemirim, Espírito Santo, Pinheiro began playing football in his hometown before joining Duque de Caxias in 2013. He left the club in the following year, and spent the most of 2015 back in Cachoeiro before entering Americano's youth categories late in that year.

After making his senior debut with Americano in 2017, Pinheiro was regularly used before signing for Boa Esporte on 29 August 2020. Ahead of the 2022 season, he moved to Nova Iguaçu.

On 29 August 2024, after being the captain of Nova Iguaçu as the club reached the finals of the Campeonato Carioca, Pinheiro was loaned to Série B side Brusque until the end of the year. On 8 April 2025, he agreed to a permanent deal with Volta Redonda.

In December 2025, Pinheiro agreed to a loan deal with Portuguesa, but asked to leave the club before the start of the season, after having an offer from Juventude. On 21 January 2026, he was announced at the latter club on a one-year loan deal.

== Career statistics ==
As of 5 November 2026

Club	Season	League			State League		Cup		Continental		Other		Total	
Club	Season	Division	Apps	Goals	Apps	Goals	Apps	Goals	Apps	Goals	Apps	Goals	Apps	Goals
Americano	2017	Carioca Série B	—		0	0	—		—		1 (Note: Appearance(s) in Copa Rio)	0	1	0
Americano	2018	Série D	1	0	10	0	—		—		9	1	20	1
Americano	2019	Carioca	—		15	1	—		—		2	0	17	1
Americano	2020	Carioca	—		14	1	—		—		—		14	1
Americano	Total		1	0	39	2	—		—		12	1	52	3
Boa Esporte	2020	Série C	4	0	—		—		—		—		4	0
Boa Esporte	2021	Série D	13	0	6	0	—		—		—		19	0
Boa Esporte	Total		17	0	6	0	—		—		—		23	0
Nova Iguaçu	2022	Série D	12	1	14	0	1	0	—		—		27	1
Nova Iguaçu	2023	Série D	0	0	10	0	2	0	—		—		12	0
Nova Iguaçu	2024	Série D	17	0	14	1	2	1	—		—		33	2
Nova Iguaçu	2025	Série D	—		11	0	1	2	—		—		12	2
Nova Iguaçu	Total		29	1	49	1	6	3	—		—		84	5
Brusque (loan)	2024	Série B	5	0	—		—		—		—		5	0
Volta Redonda	2025	Série B	25	2	—		—		—		—		25	2
Juventude (loan)	2026	Série B	23	1	5	0	6	1	—		2 (Note: Appearance(s) in Copa Sul-Sudeste)	0	36	2
Career total			100	4	99	3	12	4	0	0	14	1	225	8
