= Gabriel Bahia =

Brazilian footballer (born 1998)

Personal information
- Full name: Gabriel Henrique Feitosa da Silva
- Date of birth: 24 November 1998 (age 27)
- Place of birth: Juazeiro, Brazil
- Height: 1.90 m (6 ft 3 in)
- Position: Centre-back

Team information
- Current team: Novorizontino (on loan from Volta Redonda)
- Number: 26

Youth career
- Vitória
- Juazeirense
- 2018: → XV de Piracicaba (loan)

Senior career*
Years	Team	Apps	(Gls)
2018–2020	Juazeirense	0	(0)
2018	→ Andradina (loan)	7	(1)
2019	→ Andradina (loan)	16	(2)
2020	→ Bandeirante (loan)	14	(1)
2021–2024	Bandeirante	36	(2)
2021	→ Matonense (loan)	15	(1)
2023–2024	→ Volta Redonda (loan)	13	(1)
2025–	Volta Redonda	27	(3)
2025	→ Botafogo (loan)	4	(0)
2026–	→ Novorizontino (loan)	21	(0)
- * Club domestic league appearances and goals as of 17 November 2026

Gabriel Henrique Feitosa da Silva (born 24 November 1998), known as Gabriel Bahia, is a Brazilian footballer who plays as a centre-back for Novorizontino, on loan from Volta Redonda.

== Career ==
Born in Juazeiro, in the state of Bahia (which originated his nickname), he played for the youth sides of Vitória and Juazeirense. He was loaned to XV de Piracicaba, but only played for the under-20 team, and made his senior debut at Andradina, also on loan.

Gabriel Bahia was announced back at Andradina in February 2019, and moved to Bandeirante also in a temporary deal in September 2020. He joined the latter club in a permanent deal the following January, after achieving promotion to the Campeonato Paulista Série A3, but was loaned to Matonense in July.

Gabriel Bahia also helped Matonense to achieve promotion before returning to BEC, and renewed his contract with the club on 15 December 2022, after establishing himself as an undisputed starter. On 4 April 2023, he was announced at Série C side Volta Redonda on loan.

Despite struggling with injuries, Gabriel Bahia became a starter in the 2024 Série C, helping Voltaço to achieve promotion to the Série B. On 18 December of that year, he signed a permanent two-year deal with the club.

On 26 August 2025, Série A side Botafogo announced the signing of Gabriel Bahia on loan until March 2026. He made his debut in the category on 28 September, starting in a 2–0 away loss to Fluminense.

== Career statistics ==
As of 9 December 2025

Club	Season	League			State League		Cup		Continental		Other		Total	
Club	Season	Division	Apps	Goals	Apps	Goals	Apps	Goals	Apps	Goals	Apps	Goals	Apps	Goals
Juazeirense	2018	Série C	—		0	0	—		—		—		0	0
Andradina (loan)	2018	Paulista 2ª Divisão	—		7	1	—		—		—		7	1
Andradina (loan)	2019	Paulista 2ª Divisão	—		16	2	—		—		—		16	2
Bandeirante	2020	Paulista 2ª Divisão	—		14	1	—		—		—		14	1
Bandeirante	2021	Paulista A3	—		12	2	—		—		—		12	2
Bandeirante	2022	Paulista A3	—		12	0	—		—		—		12	0
Bandeirante	2023	Paulista A3	—		12	0	—		—		—		12	0
Bandeirante	Total		—		50	3	—		—		—		50	3
Matonense (loan)	2021	Paulista 2ª Divisão	—		15	1	—		—		—		15	1
Volta Redonda	2023	Série C	3	0	—		2	1	—		—		5	1
Volta Redonda	2024	Série C	10	1	0	0	0	0	—		3 (Note: Appearance(s) in Copa Rio)	0	13	1
Volta Redonda	2025	Série B	17	2	10	0	—		—		—		27	2
Volta Redonda	Total		30	3	10	0	2	1	—		3	0	45	4
Botafogo (loan)	2025	Série A	4	0	—		0	0	—		—		4	0
Career total			34	3	98	7	2	1	0	0	3	0	137	11
