= 2026–27 Kawasaki Frontale season =

Kawasaki Frontale
2026–27 season
- Owner: Fujitsu
- Chairman: Yoshihiro Warashina
- Stadium: Kawasaki Todoroki Stadium; Kawasaki, Kanagawa
| Home colours | Away colours |

The 2026–27 season is Kawasaki Frontale's 31th season in history.

== Players ==
| No. | Name | Nationality | Date of birth (age) | Previous club | Contract since | Contract end |
Goalkeepers
| 1 | Louis Yamaguchi | (Japan) (France) | 28 May 1998 (age 28) | (Japan) FC Machida Zelvia | 2024 | 2025 |
| 21 | Yuki Hayasaka | (Japan) | 22 May 1999 (age 27) | (Japan) Iwaki FC | 2022 | |
| 33 | Lee Keun-hyeong | (South Korea) | 22 May 2006 (age 20) | (South Korea) Boin High School | 2025 | 2027 |
| 49 | Svend Brodersen | (Germany) | 22 March 1997 (age 29) | (Japan) Fagiano Okayama | 2026 | 2027 |
Defenders
| 2 | Yuto Matsunagane | (Japan) | 14 September 2004 (age 22) | (Japan) Fukushima United | | |
| 3 | Hiroto Taniguchi | (Japan) | 30 September 1999 (age 27) | (Japan) Tokyo Verdy | 2026 | 2027 |
| 4 | Pedro Romano | (Brazil) | 26 November 2000 (age 25) | (Brazil) Vila Nova | | |
| 5 | Asahi Sasaki | (Japan) | 26 January 2000 (age 26) | (Japan) Ryutsu Keizai University | 2022 | |
| 13 | Sota Miura | (Japan) | 7 September 2000 (age 26) | (Japan) Ventforet Kofu | 2024 | |
| 22 | Filip Uremović | (Croatia) | 11 February 1997 (age 29) | (Croatia) Hajduk Split | 2025 | 2028 |
| 28 | Yuichi Maruyama | (Japan) | 16 June 1989 (age 37) | (Japan) Nagoya Grampus | 2024 | |
| 29 | Reon Yamahara | (Japan) | 8 June 1999 (age 27) | (Japan) Shimizu S-Pulse | 2026 | 2027 |
| 30 | Hiroto Noda | (Japan) | 5 April 2006 (age 20) | (Japan) Shizuoka Gakuen School | 2025 | |
| 31 | Noriharu Kan | (Japan) (China) | 11 April 2007 (age 19) | Youth Team | | |
| 32 | Shunsuke Hayashi | (Japan) | 29 May 2007 (age 19) | Youth Team | | |
| 35 | Tetsuya Takahashi | (Japan) | 15 January 2005 (age 21) | (Japan) Kansai University | | |
| 39 | Asuto Fujita | (Japan) | 22 November 2008 (age 17) | Youth Team | | |
Midfielders
| 6 | Yuki Yamamoto | (Japan) | 6 November 1997 (age 29) | (Japan) Gamba Osaka | 2024 | |
| 8 | Kento Tachibanada | (Japan) | 29 May 1998 (age 28) | (Japan) Toin University of Yokohama | 2020 | 2027 |
| 10 | Ryota Oshima | (Japan) | 23 January 1993 (age 33) | (Japan) J.League U-22 Selection | 2011 | |
| 14 | Yasuto Wakizaka | (Japan) | 11 June 1995 (age 31) | (Japan) Hannan University | 2018 | |
| 16 | Yuto Ozeki | (Japan) | 6 February 2005 (age 21) | (Japan) Fukushima United | | |
| 19 | So Kawahara | (Japan) | 13 March 1998 (age 28) | (Japan) Sagan Tosu | 2024 | |
| 25 | Shuto Yamaichi | (Japan) | 20 January 2004 (age 22) | (Japan) Waseda University | 2026 | |
| 26 | Kota Yui | (Japan) | 10 June 2005 (age 21) | (Japan) Fukushima United | | |
| 34 | Ryuki Osa | (Japan) | 13 October 2007 (age 19) | (Japan) Shohei High School | | |
| 37 | Hiroto Ogawa | (Japan) | 9 December 2008 (age 17) | Youth Team | | |
| 41 | Akihiro Ienaga | (Japan) | 13 June 1986 (age 40) | (Japan) Omiya Ardija | 2017 | |
Forwards
| 9 | Lazar Romanić | (Serbia) | 25 March 1998 (age 28) | (Serbia) Vojvodina | 2025 | |
| 11 | Yu Kobayashi | (Japan) | 23 September 1987 (age 39) | (Japan) Mito HollyHock | 2008 | |
| 17 | Tatsuya Ito | (Japan) | 26 June 1997 (age 29) | (Germany) 1. FC Magdeburg | 2025 | |
| 18 | Kazuya Konno | (Japan) | 11 July 1997 (age 29) | (Japan) Avispa Fukuoka | 2026 | 2027 |
| 20 | Kyosuke Mochiyama | (Japan) | 18 August 2003 (age 23) | (Japan) Chuo University | 2025 | |
| 23 | Marcinho | (Brazil) | 16 May 1995 (age 31) | (China) Chongqing Lifan | 2021 | |
| 24 | Ten Miyagi | (Japan) | 2 June 2001 (age 25) | (Japan) Montedio Yamagata | 2020 | |
| 36 | Rin Homma | (Japan) | 3 August 2004 (age 22) | (Japan) Kokushikan University | | |
| 93 | Kayke Queiroz | (Brazil) | 19 June 2006 (age 20) | (Brazil) Botafogo (Loan) | 2026 | 2027 |
| 97 | Derik Lacerda | (Brazil) | 27 September 1999 (age 27) | (Brazil) Cuiabá | 2026 | 2027 |
Players who left on loan/mid-season
| 15 | Toya Myogan (M) | (Japan) | 29 June 2004 (age 22) | (Japan) Vegalta Sendai | | |
| 27 | Ryota Kamihashi (D) | (Japan) | 16 June 2002 (age 24) | (Japan) Waseda University | 2025 | |
| 28 | Patrick Verhon | (Brazil) | 8 September 2004 (age 22) | (Japan) Oita Trinita | 2024 | |
| 38 | Soma Kanda (F) | (Japan) | 29 December 2005 (age 20) | (Japan) Shizuoka Gakuen High School | 2025 | 2027 |
| | Kaito Tsuchiya (D) | (Japan) | 12 May 2006 (age 20) | (Japan) Fukushima United | 2022 | 2028 |
Players who left permanently in mid-season
| | Takatora Einaga (F) | (Japan) | 7 April 2003 (age 23) | (Belgium) Beerschot | | |

Kawasaki Frontale U-18

As of 29 April 2026

Below are list of U-18 team players belong to Kawasaki Frontale academy that competing in 2026 Prince Takamado U-18 Premier League, the top-flight league for U-18 team of football clubs and senior high school football teams in the country. Only registered players for the competition will be displayed.

Note: Flags indicate national team as defined under FIFA eligibility rules; some limited exceptions apply. Players may hold more than one non-FIFA nationality.

| No. | Pos. | Nation | Player |
|---|---|---|---|
| 1 | GK | JPN | Kantaro Iwata |
| 2 | DF | JPN | Yohei Yamakawa |
| 3 | DF | JPN | Asuto Fujita (vice-captain) * |
| 4 | MF | JPN | Louis Imahiro (vice-captain) |
| 5 | DF | JPN | Kosuke Nagasaki (vice-captain) |
| 6 | MF | JPN | Shuto Oda |
| 7 | DF | JPN | Shota Ogawa |
| 8 | MF | JPN | Hiroto Ogawa (vice-captain) * |
| 9 | FW | JPN | Kyu Kawamura |
| 10 | MF | JPN | Katsuyoshi Kinoshita (captain) |
| 11 | FW | JPN | Neo Hirose |
| 13 | FW | JPN | Eita Mikami |
| 14 | MF | JPN | Quan Tianhai |
| 15 | DF | JPN | Kyo Kikuchi |
| 16 | GK | JPN | Kanta Okamoto |
| 17 | MF | JPN | Kazato Kimura |
| 18 | DF | JPN | Takuma Sasakura |
| 19 | GK | JPN | Ryuto Ueki |
| 20 | MF | JPN | Kō Kato |
| 21 | GK | JPN | Futo Komura |
| 22 | FW | JPN | Seiyo Sogo |
| 23 | MF | JPN | Hiruzu Sakai |

| No. | Pos. | Nation | Player |
|---|---|---|---|
| 24 | DF | JPN | Yuta Kawanishi |
| 25 | FW | JPN | Koga Nishikawa |
| 26 | DF | JPN | Haru Tsushima |
| 27 | MF | JPN | Hayato Takeuchi |
| 28 | DF | JPN | Sho Inomata |
| 29 | DF | JPN | Tokito Noda |
| 30 | DF | JPN | Ryuto Yoshida |
| 31 | DF | JPN | Taichi Watanabe |
| 32 | MF | JPN | Takuma Watanabe |
| 33 | GK | JPN | Kaoru Aoki |
| 34 | MF | JPN | Taiga Nakano |
| 35 | MF | JPN | Rei Hamano |
| 36 | MF | JPN | Towa Sakanishi |
| 37 | MF | JPN | Eito Natsume |
| 38 | MF | JPN | Mizuki Arai |
| 39 | MF | JPN | Fuya Mochizuki |
| 40 | FW | JPN | Ryusei Doi |
| 41 | MF | JPN | Kojiro Hatsune |
| 42 | FW | JPN | Sho Kawakami |
| 43 | FW | JPN | Rintaro Hayashi |
| 44 | DF | JPN | Koshiro Ueno |
| 45 | MF | JPN | Eito Yoshizawa |

Players marked with * (Asterisk) set to become full-time members of the first team beginning January 2027. As of 7 August 2026, they are registered as type 2 players.

== Management and staff ==
Club officials for 2026–27 season.

| Position | Name |
|---|---|
| Manager | (Japan) Shigetoshi Hasebe |
| Assistant manager | (Japan) Yasuhiro Nagahashi |
| Coaches | (Japan) Yuki Yoshida (Japan) Masashi Oguro (Japan) Hideki Sahara (Japan) Kazuno Nakashima |
| Goalkeeper coach | (Japan) Tomoaki Ishino |
| Strength and Conditioning Coach | (Japan) Sotaro Higuchi (Poland) Wojciech Ignatiuk |
| Assistant S&C coach | (Japan) Keisuke Matsumoto |
| Analyst | (India) Shlok Asher |
| Trainer | (Japan) Yoji Hirahara (Japan) Tomohisa Seki (Japan) Katsuhiro Suzuki (Japan) Naoya Kinoshima |
| Physiotherapist | (Japan) Hiroshi Nishimura (Japan) Ryota Kudo |
| Interpreter | (Japan) Kazuya Nakayama (Japan) Hiroto Furukawa (South Korea) Kim Myong-ho |
| Roupeiro | (Japan) Hiroyuki Ito |
| Side manager | (Japan) Takashi Seto (Japan) Akito Kobayashi |
| Scouting | (Japan) Tatsuru Mukojima |
| Doctor | (Japan) Hiroshi Iwaso (Japan) Hidetaka Goto (Japan) Yutaro Ishida (Japan) Ryota Kuzuhara (Japan) Eisaburo Honda (Japan) Kensuke Kimura |

== Friendly & Pre-season ==
Win Draw Loss

=== Tour of Hokkaido (12 - 25 July) ===
| 16 July 1 | Kawasaki Frontale | – | Vanraure Hachinohe | Hokkaido |
| | | | | Stadium: Higashi-Onuma Multipurpose Ground |

== Transfers ==
=== In ===
Pre-season

| Date | Position | Player | Transferred from | Ref |
Permanent Transfer
| 31 May 2026 | DF | (Colombia) César Haydar | (Colombia) Atlético Nacional | End of loan |
| 31 May 2026 | DF | (Japan) Kaito Tsuchiya | (Japan) Fukushima United | End of loan |
| 31 May 2026 | FW | (Japan) Takatora Einaga | (Japan) Fukushima United | End of loan |
| 31 May 2026 | FW | (Brazil) Patrick Verhon | (Japan) Oita Trinita | End of loan |
| 8 June 2026 | DF | (Japan) Tetsuya Takahashi | (Japan) Kansai University | Free |
| 1 July 2026 | DF | (Brazil) Pedro Romano | (Brazil) Vila Nova | Undisclosed |
| 1 July 2026 | FW | (Brazil) Kayke | (Brazil) Botafogo | Season loan |
| 29 July 2026 | FW | (Brazil) Derik Lacerda | (Brazil) Cuiabá | Free |
| 16 August 2026 | FW | (Japan) Takatora Einaga | (Japan) Fukushima United | End of loan (Note: Takatora Einaga returns as he will be transferring overseas.) |
| June 2026 | FW | (Japan) Shōgo Taniguchi | (Belgium) Sint-Truidense | Undisclosed |
Loan Transfer

Mid-season

| Date | Position | Player | Transferred from | Ref |
Permanent Transfer
| 1 January 2027 | DF | (Japan) Asuka Fujita | Youth Team | Promoted |
| 1 January 2027 | MF | (Japan) Hiroto Ogawa | Youth Team | Promoted |
Loan Transfer

=== Out ===
Pre-season

| Date | Position | Player | Transferred to | Ref |
Permanent Transfer
| 24 June 2026 | FW | (Brazil) Erison | (Japan) JEF United Chiba | Undisclosed |
| 10 July 2026 | DF | (Colombia) César Haydar | (Colombia) Atlético Nacional | Undisclosed |
| August 2026 | FW | (Japan) Takatora Einaga | (Belgium) K Beerschot VA | Free |
Loan Transfer
| 20 June 2026 | DF | (Japan) Kaito Tsuchiya | (Japan) Fukushima United | Season loan |
| 20 June 2026 | FW | (Japan) Takatora Einaga | (Japan) Fukushima United | Season loan |
| 25 June 2026 | DF | (Japan) Ryota Kamihashi | (Japan) Giravanz Kitakyushu | Season loan |
| 25 June 2026 | MF | (Japan) Toya Myogan | (Japan) Tochigi SC | Season loan |
| 28 June 2026 | FW | (Japan) Soma Kanda | (Japan) Tokyo Verdy | Season loan |
| 1 July 2026 | FW | (Brazil) Patrick Verhon | (Japan) Oita Trinita | Season loan |

== Competitions ==
=== J1 League ===
The matches were unveiled on 13 June.

| Pos | Team | Pld | W | D | L | GF | GA | GD | Pts |
|---|---|---|---|---|---|---|---|---|---|
| 6 | Kashima Antlers | 14 | 7 | 2 | 5 | 29 | 24 | +5 | 23 |
| 7 | Yokohama F. Marinos | 14 | 5 | 7 | 2 | 21 | 15 | +6 | 22 |
| 8 | Kawasaki Frontale | 14 | 6 | 4 | 4 | 28 | 24 | +4 | 22 |
| 9 | Urawa Red Diamonds | 14 | 7 | 1 | 6 | 23 | 29 | −6 | 22 |
| 10 | Fagiano Okayama | 14 | 5 | 2 | 7 | 16 | 22 | −6 | 17 |

Updated to match(es) played on 8 November 2026. Source: JLeague.jp,
Rules for classification: 1) Points; 2) Goal difference; 3) Goals scored; 4) Head-to-head points; 5) Head-to-head goal difference; 6) Head-to-head goals scored; 7) Fewer disciplinary points.

==== Matches ====
| 9 August 1 | Tokyo Verdy | 1–1 | Kawasaki Frontale | Chōfu |
| | Shuhei Mizoguchi 46' | Report | Lazar Romanić 90+6'; Tatsuya Ito (yellow card) 68' | Stadium: Ajinomoto Stadium; Attendance: 27,452; Referee: Takafumi Mikuriya |

| 15 August 2 | Kawasaki Frontale | 2–2 | Kyoto Sanga | Kawasaki |
| | Lazar Romanić 43'; Marcinho 63'; Yuto Ozeki (yellow card) 80' | Report | Shinnosuke Fukuda 54'; Rafael Elias 58'; Alex Souza (yellow card) 9'; Weverton (yellow card) 49' | Stadium: Kawasaki Todoroki Stadium; Attendance: 22,660; Referee: Futoshi Nakamura |

| 22 August 3 | Sanfrecce Hiroshima | 1–1 | Kawasaki Frontale | Hiroshima |
| | Mutsuki Kato 29' (yellow card) 45'; Tsukasa Shiotani (yellow card) 15' | Report | Yuki Yamamoto 59'; Lazar Romanić (yellow card) 72' | Stadium: Edion Peace Wing Hiroshima; Attendance: 27,057; Referee: Yuzo Sutani |

| 29 August 4 | Kawasaki Frontale | 4–2 | JEF United Chiba | Kawasaki |
| | Derik Lacerda 10'; Tatsuya Ito 37' (yellow card) 14'; Marcinho 43'; Yasuto Wakizaka 45+3'; Rin Homma (yellow card) 88' | Report | Kazuki Tanaka 26', 38'; Masaru Hidaka (yellow card) 24'; Erison (yellow card) 34'; Matheus Indio (yellow card) 58'; Hinata Kida (yellow card) 90+2' | Stadium: Kawasaki Todoroki Stadium; Attendance: 22,919; Referee: Florian Exner (Germany) |

| 2 September 5 | Machida Zelvia | 2–1 | Kawasaki Frontale | Tokyo |
| | Kōki Ogawa 75', 81' | Report | Yasuto Wakizaka 59' | Stadium: Machida GION Stadium; Attendance: 9,021; Referee: Fu Ming (China) |

| 6 September 6 | Kawasaki Frontale | 3–1 | Shimizu S-Pulse | Tokyo |
| | Kyosuke Mochiyama 1'; Marcinho 77', 90' (yellow card) 72' | Report | Oh Se-Hun 68' (pen.); Tomoya Fujii (yellow card) 27'; Jelani Reshaun Sumiyoshi (red card) 40'; Mateus Brunetti (yellow card) 79'; Yuji Takahashi (yellow card) 83' | Stadium: Japan National Stadium; Attendance: 37,784; Referee: Jumpei Iida |

| 12 September 7 | Mito HollyHock | 0–1 | Kawasaki Frontale | Mito |
| | Taishi Semba (yellow card) 88' | Report | Marcinho 59'; Filip Uremovic (yellow card) 79'; Pedro Romano (yellow card) 87' | Stadium: K's denki Stadium Mito; Attendance: 9,956; Referee: Ryo Tanimoto |

| 19 September 8 | Kawasaki Frontale | 3–3 | Kashima Antlers | Kawasaki |
| | Marcinho 45+3'; Tatsuya Ito 54'; Pedro Romano 90+7' (yellow card) 90+7'; Yuki Yamamoto (yellow card) 37'; Derik Lacerda (yellow card) 43' | Report | Léo Ceará 44', 67'; Yuta Matsumura 84'; Toru Oniki (yellow card) 27'; Kento Misao (yellow card) 60' | Stadium: Kawasaki Todoroki Stadium; Attendance: 22,734; Referee: Futoshi Nakamura |

| 11 October 9 | Kawasaki Frontale | 1–2 | Nagoya Grampus | Kawasaki |
| | Yasuto Wakizaka 4'; Reon Yamahara (yellow card) 41' | Report | Haruya Fujii 2'; Yuya Yamagishi 74'; Kensuke Nagai (yellow card) 11'; Yuki Nogami (yellow card) 57' | Stadium: Kawasaki Todoroki Stadium; Attendance: 22,333; Referee: Yuzo Sutani |

| 17 October 10 | Cerezo Osaka | 2–4 | Kawasaki Frontale | Osaka |
| | Lucas Fernandes 43' (pen.); Yōta Komi 48'; Ayumu Ohata (red card) 19'; Jackson Irvine (yellow card) 53'; Pablo Sabbag (yellow card) 65' | Report | Pedro Romano 10' (yellow card) 37'; Kento Tachibanada 45+3'; Yasuto Wakizaka 74'; Yuto Ozeki 89' | Stadium: Yodoko Sakura Stadium; Attendance: 20,649; Referee: Masuya Ueda |

| 21 October 11 | Kawasaki Frontale | 2–1 | Vissel Kobe | Kawasaki |
| | Marcinho 61'; Tatsuya Ito 71'; Asahi Sasaki (yellow card) 53' | Report | Yuya Osako 73'; Yoshinori Muto (yellow card) 79' | Stadium: Kawasaki Todoroki Stadium; Attendance: 20,737; Referee: Futoshi Nakamura |

| 25 October 12 | Kawasaki Frontale | 2–1 | Fagiano Okayama | Kawasaki |
| | Derik Lacerda 12' (yellow card) 59'; Marcinho 51' | Report | Oberdan 75'; Yoshitake Suzuki (yellow card) 27'; Lucao (yellow card) 47' | Stadium: Kawasaki Todoroki Stadium; Attendance: 19,586; Referee: Keigo Sendachi |

| 1 November 13 | Yokohama F. Marinos | 4–2 | Kawasaki Frontale | Yokohama |
| | Daiya Tono 12'; Tomoki Kondo 28'; Kaina Tanimura 42'; Jeison Quiñónes 56'; Hiroki Iikura (yellow card) 17'; Ryo Miyaichi (yellow card) 69'; Taisei Inoue (yellow card) 72' | Report | Filip Uremovic 33' (yellow card) 75'; Yuto Ozeki 90+3' | Stadium: Nissan Stadium; Attendance: 40,738; Referee: Daichi Shiino |

| 7 November 14 | Kashiwa Reysol | 2–1 | Kawasaki Frontale | Chiba |
| | Hinata Yamauchi 40', 52' | Report | Pedro Romano 44'; Kento Tachibanada (yellow card) 50' | Stadium: Sankyo Frontier Kashiwa Stadium; Attendance: 13,827; Referee: Yusuke Ohashi |

| 21 November 15 | Kawasaki Frontale | 1–0 | Avispa Fukuoka | Kawasaki |
| | Tatsuya Ito 60'; Yasuto Wakizaka (yellow card) 52'; Shuto Yamaichi (yellow card) 90+3' | Report | Shu Morooka (yellow card) 34'; Tomoya Miki (yellow card) 63' | Stadium: Kawasaki Todoroki Stadium; Attendance: 20,063; Referee: Hayato Shimizu |

| 25 November 16 | V-Varen Nagasaki | – | Kawasaki Frontale | Nagasaki |
| | | Report | | Stadium: Peace Stadium Connected by SoftBank |

| 29 November 17 (Rescheduled) | Kawasaki Frontale | – | Gamba Osaka | Kawasaki |
| | | Report | | Stadium: Kawasaki Todoroki Stadium |

| 4 December 18 | FC Tokyo | – | Kawasaki Frontale | Tokyo |
| | | Report | | Stadium: Japan National Stadium |

| 13 December 19 | Urawa Red Diamonds | – | Kawasaki Frontale | Saitama |
| | | Report | | Stadium: Saitama Stadium 2002 |

| 19 December 20 | Kawasaki Frontale | – | Kashiwa Reysol | Kawasaki |
| | | Report | | Stadium: Kawasaki Todoroki Stadium |

| 13 February 21 | Vissel Kobe | – | Kawasaki Frontale | Kobe |
| | | | | Stadium: Noevir Stadium Kobe |

| 20 February 22 | JEF United Chiba | – | Kawasaki Frontale | Chiba |
| | | | | Stadium: Fukuda Denshi Arena |

| 27 February 23 | Kawasaki Frontale | – | Machida Zelvia | Tokyo |
| | | | | Stadium: Japan National Stadium |

| 6 March 24 | Kawasaki Frontale | – | Urawa Red Diamonds | Kawasaki |
| | | | | Stadium: Kawasaki Todoroki Stadium |

| 10 March 25 | Shimizu S-Pulse | – | Kawasaki Frontale | Shizuoka |
| | | | | Stadium: IAI Stadium Nihondaira |

| 3 March 26 (Rescheduled) | Kyoto Sanga | – | Kawasaki Frontale | Kyoto |
| | | | | Stadium: Sanga Stadium by Kyocera |

| 20 March 27 | Kawasaki Frontale | – | FC Tokyo | Kawasaki |
| | | | | Stadium: Kawasaki Todoroki Stadium |

| 3 April 28 | Gamba Osaka | – | Kawasaki Frontale | Osaka |
| | | | | Stadium: Suita City Football Stadium |

| 10 April 29 | Kawasaki Frontale | – | V-Varen Nagasaki | Kawasaki |
| | | | | Stadium: Kawasaki Todoroki Stadium |

| 17 April 30 | Kawasaki Frontale | – | Tokyo Verdy | Kawasaki |
| | | | | Stadium: Kawasaki Todoroki Stadium |

| 24 April 31 | Nagoya Grampus | – | Kawasaki Frontale | Toyota |
| | | | | Stadium: Toyota Stadium |

| 29 April 32 | Kawasaki Frontale | – | Mito HollyHock | Kawasaki |
| | | | | Stadium: Kawasaki Todoroki Stadium |

| 3 May 33 | Fagiano Okayama | – | Kawasaki Frontale | Okayama |
| | | | | Stadium: City Light Stadium |

| 9 May 34 | Kashima Antlers | – | Kawasaki Frontale | Tokyo |
| | | | | Stadium: Japan National Stadium |

| 15 May 35 | Kawasaki Frontale | – | Yokohama F. Marinos | Kawasaki |
| | | | | Stadium: Kawasaki Todoroki Stadium |

| 22 May 36 | Kawasaki Frontale | – | Cerezo Osaka | Kawasaki |
| | | | | Stadium: Kawasaki Todoroki Stadium |

| 29 May 37 | Avispa Fukuoka | – | Kawasaki Frontale | Fukuoka |
| | | | | Stadium: Best Denki Stadium |

| 6 June 38 | Kawasaki Frontale | – | Sanfrecce Hiroshima | Kawasaki |
| | | | | Stadium: Kawasaki Todoroki Stadium |

=== Emperor's Cup ===
| 26 August 2026 Rd 2 | Kawasaki Frontale | 3–1 | Tochigi SC | Kawasaki |
| | Yuto Ozeki 45', 56'; Kazuya Konno 50'; Deriki Lacerda (yellow card) 16' | Report | Kenneth Otabor 29' (yellow card) 77'; Kaito Abe (yellow card) 42' | Stadium: Kawasaki Todoroki Stadium; Attendance: 7,596; Referee: Yoshito Nakagawa |

| 7 October 2026 Rd 3 | Tegevajaro Miyazaki | 0–2 | Kawasaki Frontale | Miyazaki |
| | Eisuke Wantanabe (yellow card) 16' | Report | Marcinho 12'; Sota Miura 50'; Filip Uremovic (yellow card) 33'; Kyosuke Mochiyama (yellow card) 72' | Stadium: Ichigo Miyazaki Shintomi Football Stadium; Attendance: 3,356; Referee: Koji Takasaki |

| 9 December 2026 Rd of 16 | Kawasaki Frontale | – | Yokohama F.Marinos | Kawasaki |
| | | | | Stadium: Kawasaki Todoroki Stadium |

=== J.League Cup ===
| 29 September Rd 2 | Roasso Kumamoto | 0–1 | Kawasaki Frontale | Kumamoto |
| | Ora Ishihara (yellow card) 68'; Naoya Mishina (yellow card) 85' | Report | Filip Uremovic 58'; Reon Yamahara (yellow card) 84' | Stadium: Egao Kenkō Stadium; Attendance: 6,682; Referee: Koei Koya |

| 14 October Rd 3 | Júbilo Iwata | 0–4 | Kawasaki Frontale | Shizuoka |
| | Kensuke Fujiwara (yellow card) 40'; Daiki Kaneko (yellow card) 71' | Report | Yuichi Maruyama 18'; So Kawahara 50' (yellow card) 38'; Pedro Romano 72'; Shuto Yamaichi 84' | Stadium: Yamaha Stadium; Attendance: 4,656; Referee: Koichiro Fukushima |

| 28 October Rd 4 | Sagan Tosu | 0–2 | Kawasaki Frontale | Tosu |
| | Noriyoshi Sakai (yellow card) 75' | Report | Shuto Yamaichi 65'; Marcinho (yellow card) 86'; Yuto Matsunagane (yellow card) 64' | Stadium: Ekimae Real Estate Stadium; Attendance: 5,366; Referee: Takuya Kobayashi |

| 11 November Prime Rd QF Leg 1 | Kawasaki Frontale | 1–2 | Kashiwa Reysol | Kawasaki |
| | Tatsuya Itō 47'; Kyosuke Mochiyama (yellow card) 83'; So Kawahara (yellow card) 90+3' | Report | Hiromu Mitsumaru 84'; Tojiro Kubo 87'; Yusei Yamanouchi (yellow card) 56'; Sachiro Toshima (yellow card) 79'; Yoshio Koizumi (yellow card) 81'; Mao Hosaya (yellow card) 90+3' | Stadium: Kawasaki Todoroki Stadium; Attendance: 11,072; Referee: Akihiko Ikeuchi |

| 15 November Prime Rd QF Leg 2 | Kashiwa Reysol | 5–4 | Kawasaki Frontale | Chiba |
| | Tojiro Kubo 45+2', 64'; Shōta Fujio 54'; Hinata Yamauchi 60'; Yusuke Segawa 72' | Report | Hiroto Taniguchi 9'; Tatsuya Itō 26'; Yasuto Wakizaka 30'; Shuto Yamaichi 82'; Filip Uremović (yellow card) 26'; Yuki Yamamoto (yellow card) 35'; Yusei Yamanouchi (yellow card) 56'; Sota Miura (yellow card) 88'; Asahi Sasaki (yellow card) 90+1' | Stadium: Sankyo Frontier Kashiwa Stadium; Attendance: 9,189; Referee: Atsushi Kamimura |

Kashiwa Reysol won 7–5 on aggregate.

== Team statistics ==
=== Appearances and goals ===
As of 21 Nov 2026

| No. | Pos. | Player | J1 League | | Emperor's Cup | | J.League Cup | | Total | |
| No. | Pos. | Player | Apps | Goals | Apps | Goals | Apps | Goals | Apps | Goals |
|---|---|---|---|---|---|---|---|---|---|---|
| 1 | GK | (Japan) (France) Louis Yamaguchi | 0 | 0 | 1 | 0 | 4 | 0 | 5 | 0 |
| 2 | DF | (Japan) Yuto Matsunagane | 0+1 | 0 | 1 | 0 | 2 | 0 | 4 | 0 |
| 3 | DF | (Japan) Hiroto Taniguchi | 8 | 0 | 0 | 0 | 1 | 0 | 9 | 0 |
| 4 | DF | (Brazil) Pedro Romano | 14 | 3 | 0+1 | 0 | 0+3 | 1 | 18 | 4 |
| 5 | DF | (Japan) Asahi Sasaki | 9+6 | 0 | 1 | 0 | 2+1 | 0 | 19 | 0 |
| 6 | MF | (Japan) Yuki Yamamoto | 13+2 | 1 | 1 | 0 | 2 | 0 | 18 | 1 |
| 8 | MF | (Japan) Kento Tachibanada | 15 | 1 | 1 | 0 | 0+2 | 0 | 18 | 1 |
| 9 | FW | (Serbia) Lazar Romanić | 3+1 | 2 | 0+1 | 0 | 0 | 0 | 5 | 2 |
| 10 | MF | (Japan) Ryota Oshima | 0 | 0 | 0 | 0 | 0 | 0 | 0 | 0 |
| 11 | DF | (Japan) Yu Kobayashi | 0+4 | 0 | 0 | 0 | 1+1 | 0 | 6 | 0 |
| 13 | MF | (Japan) Sota Miura | 10+4 | 0 | 2 | 1 | 2+1 | 0 | 19 | 1 |
| 14 | MF | (Japan) Yasuto Wakizaka | 14+1 | 4 | 1 | 0 | 1+2 | 0 | 19 | 4 |
| 16 | MF | (Japan) Yuto Ozeki | 2+11 | 2 | 1 | 2 | 2 | 0 | 16 | 4 |
| 17 | FW | (Japan) Tatsuya Ito | 14+1 | 4 | 1+1 | 0 | 2 | 1 | 19 | 5 |
| 18 | FW | (Japan) Kazuya Konno | 2+2 | 0 | 1 | 1 | 0 | 0 | 5 | 1 |
| 19 | DF | (Japan) So Kawahara | 1+11 | 0 | 1 | 0 | 4 | 1 | 17 | 1 |
| 20 | FW | (Japan) Kyosuke Mochiyama | 5+4 | 1 | 1+1 | 0 | 2+2 | 0 | 15 | 1 |
| 21 | GK | (Japan) Yuki Hayasaka | 0 | 0 | 0 | 0 | 0 | 0 | 0 | 0 |
| 22 | DF | (Croatia) Filip Uremović | 5+4 | 1 | 2 | 0 | 2 | 1 | 13 | 2 |
| 23 | FW | (Brazil) Marcinho | 12+3 | 8 | 2 | 1 | 1+3 | 1 | 21 | 10 |
| 24 | FW | (Japan) Ten Miyagi | 0+2 | 0 | 0 | 0 | 0 | 0 | 2 | 0 |
| 25 | MF | (Japan) Shuto Yamaichi | 2+5 | 0 | 0+2 | 0 | 3+1 | 2 | 13 | 2 |
| 26 | MF | (Japan) Kota Yui | 0 | 0 | 0 | 0 | 2 | 0 | 2 | 0 |
| 28 | DF | (Japan) Yuichi Maruyama | 3+3 | 0 | 2 | 0 | 3 | 1 | 11 | 1 |
| 29 | DF | (Japan) Reon Yamahara | 11+2 | 0 | 0+1 | 0 | 3 | 0 | 17 | 0 |
| 30 | DF | (Japan) Hiroto Noda | 0 | 0 | 0 | 0 | 0 | 0 | 0 | 0 |
| 31 | DF | (China) (Japan) Noriharu Kan | 0 | 0 | 0+1 | 0 | 0 | 0 | 1 | 0 |
| 32 | DF | (Japan) Shunsuke Hayashi | 0 | 0 | 0 | 0 | 0 | 0 | 0 | 0 |
| 33 | GK | (South Korea) Lee Geun-hyeong | 0 | 0 | 0 | 0 | 0 | 0 | 0 | 0 |
| 34 | MF | (Japan) Ryuki Osa | 0+3 | 0 | 0+1 | 0 | 2+1 | 0 | 7 | 0 |
| 35 | DF | (Japan) Tetsuya Takahashi | 0 | 0 | 0 | 0 | 1 | 0 | 1 | 0 |
| 36 | FW | (Japan) Rin Homma | 0+3 | 0 | 0 | 0 | 0 | 0 | 3 | 0 |
| 38 | FW | (Japan) Soma Kanda | 0 | 0 | 0 | 0 | 0 | 0 | 0 | 0 |
| 41 | MF | (Japan) Akihiro Ienaga | 0+2 | 0 | 0+1 | 0 | 0+1 | 0 | 4 | 0 |
| 49 | GK | (Germany) Svend Brodersen | 15 | 0 | 1 | 0 | 0 | 0 | 16 | 0 |
| 93 | FW | (Brazil) Kayke | 0 | 0 | 0 | 0 | 1+1 | 0 | 2 | 0 |
| 97 | FW | (Brazil) Derik Lacerda | 7+3 | 2 | 2 | 0 | 1 | 0 | 13 | 2 |
