= Álvaro Montoro =

Argentine footballer (born 2007)

Personal information
- Date of birth: 17 April 2007 (age 19)
- Place of birth: Concepción, Tucumán, Argentina
- Height: 1.70 m (5 ft 7 in)
- Position: Attacking midfielder

Team information
- Current team: Botafogo
- Number: 10

Youth career
- Concepción
- Liniers
- 2017–2024: Vélez Sarsfield

Senior career*
Years	Team	Apps	(Gls)
2024–2025	Vélez Sarsfield	27	(0)
2025–	Botafogo	46	(5)

International career^{‡}
2022	Argentina U17		
2024–	Argentina U20	5	(0)
Medal record
Men's football
Representing Argentina
FIFA U-20 World Cup
Runner-up	2025 Chile
- * Club domestic league appearances and goals as of 22:22, 19 September 2026 (UTC) ‡ National team caps and goals as of 16:22, 26 March 2026 (UTC)

Álvaro Montoro (born 17 April 2007) is an Argentine professional footballer who plays as an attacking midfielder for Brazilian club Botafogo.

== Early life ==
Montoro was born in the Barrio Independencia, Concepción, Tucumán. His brother, Francisco, is also a footballer and currently also plays in the academy of Vélez Sarsfield.

== Club career ==
=== Vélez Sarsfield ===
Montoro started his career with Concepción Fútbol Club, before moving to Argentina's capital, Buenos Aires, at the age of eight. In Buenos Aires, he first played for Liniers, before joining Vélez Sarsfield in 2017.

=== Botafogo ===
On 3 June 2025, Montoro was announced as Botafogo's new signing, marking his first experience in Brazilian football. He scored his first goal for the club on 29 July, in a 2–0 Copa do Brasil win over against Red Bull Bragantino, at the Estádio Nilton Santos.

In July 2025, Montoro his third goal for Botafogo in a 3–3 draw with Mirassol.

== International career ==
Montoro was called up to the Argentina under-17 team in June 2022.

In September 2025, Montoro was called up by the under-20 team to compete in the 2025 FIFA U-20 World Cup. Initially unavailable to the competition as Botafogo did not intend to release the midfielder, he was allowed to play shortly after.

In the round of 16 of the U-20 World Cup, in a match against Nigeria, Montoro fractured his collarbone and left the competition. After the injury was confirmed, the midfielder underwent surgery in Buenos Aires under the supervision of Botafogo doctors.

== Career statistics ==
As of match played 19 September 2026

Appearances and goals by club, season and competition
Club	Season	League			National cup (Note: Includes Copa Argentina, Copa do Brasil)		Continental		Other		Total	
Club	Season	Division	Apps	Goals	Apps	Goals	Apps	Goals	Apps	Goals	Apps	Goals
Vélez Sarsfield	2024	Primera División	15	0	2	0	—		1 (Note: Appearance in Trofeo de Campeones de la Liga Profesional)	0	18	0
Vélez Sarsfield	2025	Primera División	12	0	2	0	5 (Note: Appearances in Copa Libertadores)	3	—		19	3
Vélez Sarsfield	Total		27	0	4	0	5	3	1	0	37	3
Botafogo	2025	Série A	16	3	2	1	2	0	3 (Note: Appearances in FIFA Club World Cup)	0	23	4
Botafogo	2026	Série A	25	1	2	0	9 (Note: Four appearances in Copa Libertadores, six appearances and one goal in Copa Sudamericana)	1	5 (Note: Appearances in Campeonato Carioca)	1	41	3
Botafogo	Total		41	4	4	1	11	1	8	1	64	7
Career total			68	4	8	1	16	4	9	1	101	10

== Honours ==
Vélez Sarsfield

- Argentine Primera División: 2024
