= Kauan Lindes =

Brazilian footballer (born 2002)

Personal information
- Full name: Kauan Gabriel Cordeiro Lindes
- Date of birth: 28 November 2003 (age 22)
- Place of birth: Conchal, Brazil
- Height: 1.80 m (5 ft 11 in)
- Position: Attacking midfielder

Team information
- Current team: Athletic (on loan from Botafogo)

Youth career
- 2018–2019: Itapirense
- 2020: Jabaquara
- 2022: Guaçuano
- 2022–2024: Coimbra

Senior career*
Years	Team	Apps	(Gls)
2024	Coimbra	0	(0)
2024	→ Villa Nova (loan)	2	(0)
2024	→ Botafogo (loan)	0	(0)
2025–	Botafogo	6	(0)
2025	→ Athletic (loan)	8	(0)
2026–	→ Athletic (loan)	18	(3)
- * Club domestic league appearances and goals as of 18 November 2026

Kauan Gabriel Cordeiro Lindes (born 28 November 2003), known as Kauan Lindes, is a Brazilian footballer who plays as an attacking midfielder for Athletic, on loan from Botafogo.

== Career ==
Born in Conchal, São Paulo, Kauan Lindes played for the youth sides of Itapirense and Jabaquara before being released by the latter amidst the COVID-19 pandemic. After more than a year without a club, he went on to play an amateur match in the countryside of São Paulo, and impressed enough to earn himself a contract at Guaçuano.

In 2022, Kauan Lindes moved to Coimbra for the under-20 squad. After playing in the 2024 Copa São Paulo de Futebol Júnior, he was loaned to Villa Nova on 17 January of that year.

On 18 April 2024, after two matches for Villa Nova, Kauan Lindes joined Botafogo on loan, initially for the under-23 team. On 11 January of the following year, he signed a permanent five-year contract with the club, after they paid R$ 1 million for 80% of his economic rights.

After playing in the 2025 Campeonato Carioca, Kauan Lindes made his Série A debut on 11 May 2025, coming on as a second-half substitute for Cuiabano in a 4–0 home routing of Internacional.

== Career statistics ==
As of 13 May 2025

Club	Season	League			State League		Cup		Continental		Other		Total	
Club	Season	Division	Apps	Goals	Apps	Goals	Apps	Goals	Apps	Goals	Apps	Goals	Apps	Goals
Villa Nova	2024	Mineiro	—		2	0	0	0	—		—		2	0
Botafogo	2025	Série A	1	0	5	0	0	0	0	0	0	0	6	0
Career total			1	0	7	0	0	0	0	0	0	0	8	0
