= 2025 Volta Redonda FC season =

Volta Redonda FC
2025 season
- Manager: Rogério Corrêa
- Stadium: Estádio Raulino de Oliveira
- Série B: Pre-season
- Campeonato Carioca: 7th
- Average home league attendance: 1,522
Home colours
- All statistics correct as of 15 January 2025.

The 2025 season is the 49th competitive season for Volta Redonda Futebol Clube. The team will take part in the Campeonato Brasileiro Série B after earning promotion and the Campeonato Carioca.

== Squad ==
=== Transfers In ===
Pos.	Player	Transferred from	Fee	Date	Source
DF	(Brazil) Jhonny	(Brazil) Fluminense	Loan	20 February 2025	
MF	(Brazil) Raí	(Brazil) Botafogo	Loan	11 April 2025	
MF	(Brazil) Dener	(Brazil) Remo	Loan	11 April 2025	

=== Transfers Out ===
Pos.	Player	Transferred to	Fee	Date	Source
FW	(Brazil) Ítalo	(South Korea) Seoul E-Land FC	Loan	9 January 2025	

== Competitions ==
=== Overall record ===
Competition	First match	Last match	Starting round	Final position	Record							
Competition	First match	Last match	Starting round	Final position	Pld	W	D	L	GF	GA	GD	Win %
Série B	5 April 2025	22 November 2025	Matchday 1		19	5	6	8	14	21	−7	26.32
Campeonato Carioca	12 January 2025		Taca Guanabara	Semi-Final	13	6	3	4	13	16	−3	46.15
Total					32	11	9	12	27	37	−10	34.38

Last updated: 29 July 2025
Source: Competitions

=== Série B ===
==== League table ====
Pos	Team	Pld	W	D	L	GF	GA	GD	Pts	Promotion or relegation
16	Botafogo-SP	38	10	12	16	32	52	−20	42	
17	Ferroviária (R)	38	8	16	14	43	52	−9	40	Relegation to 2026 Campeonato Brasileiro Série C
18	Amazonas (R)	38	8	12	18	38	55	−17	36	Relegation to 2026 Campeonato Brasileiro Série C
19	Volta Redonda (R)	38	8	12	18	26	43	−17	36	Relegation to 2026 Campeonato Brasileiro Série C
20	Paysandu (R)	38	5	13	20	36	52	−16	28	Relegation to 2026 Campeonato Brasileiro Série C

Source: CBF
Rules for classification: 1) points; 2) wins; 3) goal difference; 4) goals scored; 5) head-to-head results (only between 2 teams); 6) fewest red cards; 7) fewest yellow cards; 8) drawing of lots.
(R) Relegated

==== Matches ====
7 April 2025 1	Volta Redonda	0–1	Cuiabá	Volta Redonda
				Stadium: Estádio Raulino de Oliveira

13 April 2025 2	Novorizontino	1–0	Volta Redonda

18 April 2025 3	CRB	1–0	Volta Redonda

23 April 2025 4	Volta Redonda	0–0	Ferroviária	Volta Redonda
				Stadium: Estádio Raulino de Oliveira

27 April 2025 5	Athletic Club	2–1	Volta Redonda

4 May 2025 6	Volta Redonda	1–0	Paysandu	Volta Redonda
				Stadium: Estádio Raulino de Oliveira

11 May 2025 7	Criciúma	0–0	Volta Redonda	Criciúma

20 May 2025 8	Volta Redonda	1–1	Amazonas	Volta Redonda
				Stadium: Estádio Raulino de Oliveira

24 May 2025 9	Remo	v	Volta Redonda	Belém
18:00 UTC−3

27 July 2025 19	Volta Redonda	2–1	Vila Nova

4 August 2025 20	Cuiabá	2–0	Volta Redonda

9 August 2025 21	Volta Redonda	0–0	Novorizontino

18 August 2025 22	Volta Redonda	0–1	CRB

=== Campeonato Carioca ===
==== Results by round ====
Round	1	2	3	4
Ground	A	H	A	A
Result	L	W	W	
Position				

Updated to match(es) played on 19 January 2025. Source:
A = Away; H = Home; W = Win; D = Draw; L = Loss

12 January 2025 1	Madureira	2–0	Volta Redonda	Madureira
16:00 UTC−3	Renato 62'; Marquinho Carioca 90+5'			Stadium: Estádio Conselheiro Galvão; Referee: Bruno Arleu de Araújo

15 January 2025 2	Volta Redonda	1–0	Fluminense	Volta Redonda
21:30 UTC−3	Mirandinha 87'		Manoel (yellow card) 37' (yellow-red card) 64'	Stadium: Estádio Raulino de Oliveira; Referee: Alex Gomes Stefano

19 January 2025 3	Bangu	0–1	Volta Redonda
20:00 UTC−3			Heliardo 68'

22 January 2025 4	Botafogo	v	Volta Redonda	Rio de Janeiro
21:30 UTC−3
