= Yuto Ozeki =

Japanese footballer

Yuto Ozeki 大関 友翔
Personal information
- Date of birth: 6 February 2005 (age 21)
- Place of birth: Asao-ku, Kawasaki, Kanagawa, Japan
- Height: 1.78 m (5 ft 10 in)
- Position: Midfielder

Team information
- Current team: Kawasaki Frontale
- Number: 16

Youth career
- Shinpukuji FC
- –2019: FC Tama
- 2020–2022: Kawasaki Frontale

Senior career*
| Years | Team | Apps | (Gls) |
| 2023– | Kawasaki Frontale | 36 | (2) |
| 2024–2025 | → Fukushima United (loan) | 33 | (8) |

International career^{‡}
| 2023 | Japan U18 | 3 | (1) |
| 2024 | Japan U19 | 3 | (0) |
| 2024– | Japan U20 | 15 | (2) |
| 2025– | Japan | 2 | (0) |
| 2026 | Japan U23 | 9 | (4) |
Medal record
Men's football
Representing Japan
AFC U-23 Asian Cup
| Gold medal – first place | 2026 Saudi Arabia |
Asian Games
| Silver medal – second place | 2026 Aichi–Nagoya |
- * Club domestic league appearances and goals as of 12 September 2026 ‡ National team caps and goals as of 3 October 2026 (UTC)

Yuto Ozeki (大関 友翔, Ōzeki Yūto; born 6 February 2005) is a Japanese professional footballer who plays as a midfielder for Kawasaki Frontale and the Japan national team.

== Club career ==
Ozeki is a youth product of Shinpukuji FC, FC Tama and Kawasaki Frontale. He was announced to be promoted to Kawasaki Frontale 28 June 2022 for the 2023 season. He made his senior and professional debut with Kawasaki Frontale in a 2–2 AFC Champions League Elite tie with Ulsan HD on 12 December 2023. He joined Fukushima United on loan in the J3 League for the 2024 season. On 27 December 2024, it was announced that he would be returning to Kawasaki Frontale's first team squad in January 2025.

== International career ==
Ozeki was called up to the Japan U20s for the 2025 AFC U-20 Asian Cup. He again was called up to the U20s for the 2025 Maurice Revello Tournament.

Ozeki was called up to the senior Japan national team for the 2025 EAFF E-1 Football Championship. He debuted with Japan that tournament in a 6–1 win over Hong Kong on 8 July 2025.

== Style of play ==
Ozeki is a technically refined midfielder capable of dictating the tempo of the game from central positions. Highly regarded for his vision, precise passing range, and ball control under pressure, he can operate as either a central playmaker or an attacking midfielder.

=== Club ===
As of match played 12 September 2026

Appearances and goals by club, season and competition
| Club | Season | League | | | National Cup | | League Cup | | Continental | | Other | | Total | |
| Club | Season | Division | Apps | Goals | Apps | Goals | Apps | Goals | Apps | Goals | Apps | Goals | Apps | Goals |
|---|---|---|---|---|---|---|---|---|---|---|---|---|---|---|
| Kawasaki Frontale | 2023 | J1 League | 0 | 0 | 0 | 0 | 0 | 0 | 1 (Note: Appearances in AFC Champions League Elite) | 0 | — | | 1 | 0 |
| Kawasaki Frontale | 2025 | J1 League | 25 | 2 | 1 | 0 | 1 | 0 | 4 | 0 | — | | 31 | 2 |
| Kawasaki Frontale | 2026 | J1 (100) | 5 | 0 | — | | — | | — | | — | | 5 | 0 |
| Kawasaki Frontale | 2026–27 | J1 League | 6 | 0 | 1 | 2 | 0 | 0 | 0 | 0 | — | | 7 | 2 |
| Kawasaki Frontale | Total | | 36 | 2 | 2 | 2 | 1 | 0 | 4 | 0 | — | | 43 | 4 |
| Fukushima United (loan) | 2024–25 | J3 League | 32 | 8 | 1 | 0 | 1 | 0 | — | | 1 (Note: Appearance in promotion play-offs) | 0 | 35 | 8 |
| Career total | | | 68 | 10 | 3 | 2 | 2 | 0 | 5 | 0 | 1 | 0 | 79 | 12 |

=== International ===
As of match played 12 July 2025

Appearances and goals by national team and year
| National team | Year | Apps | Goals |
|---|---|---|---|
| Japan | 2025 | 2 | 0 |
| Total | | 2 | 0 |

== Honours ==
Kawasaki Frontale

- Emperor's Cup: 2023

Japan

- EAFF Championship: 2025

Japan U23

- AFC U-23 Asian Cup: 2026

Individual

- 2024 J3 League Team of the Season
