= Du Fernandes =

Brazilian footballer (born 2001)

Personal information
- Full name: Eduardo Fernandes Gomes Júnior
- Date of birth: 11 June 2001 (age 25)
- Place of birth: São José do Rio Preto, Brazil
- Height: 1.79 m (5 ft 10 in)
- Position: Midfielder

Team information
- Current team: Volta Redonda
- Number: 23

Youth career
- 2016–2022: Mirassol

Senior career*
| Years | Team | Apps | (Gls) |
| 2020–2023 | Mirassol | 45 | (1) |
| 2023 | → Botafogo-PB (loan) | 6 | (1) |
| 2023 | → Aparecidense (loan) | 9 | (1) |
| 2024 | Aparecidense | 31 | (4) |
| 2024–2025 | Vila Nova | 8 | (1) |
| 2025– | Volta Redonda | 2 | (0) |
- * Club domestic league appearances and goals as of 11 November 2026

Eduardo Fernandes Gomes Júnior (born 11 June 2001), known as Du Fernandes or just Eduardo, is a Brazilian footballer who plays as a midfielder for Volta Redonda.

== Club career ==
Born in São José do Rio Preto, São Paulo, Du Fernandes joined Mirassol' youth setup in 2016, aged 15, after starting it out at a futsal team in his hometown. After impressing with the under-20s, he was promoted to the first team in July 2020, and made his professional team debut on 23 July, starting in a 0–0 Campeonato Paulista away draw against Água Santa.

After the arrival of head coach Eduardo Baptista, Du Fernandes became a regular starter in the 2020 Série D, helping in the side's first-ever promotion as champions.

== Career statistics ==
As of 28 December 2023

| Club | Season | League | | | State League | | Cup | | Continental | | Other | | Total | |
| Club | Season | Division | Apps | Goals | Apps | Goals | Apps | Goals | Apps | Goals | Apps | Goals | Apps | Goals |
|---|---|---|---|---|---|---|---|---|---|---|---|---|---|---|
| Mirassol | 2020 | Série D | 21 | 0 | 4 | 0 | — | | — | | — | | 25 | 0 |
| Mirassol | 2021 | Série C | 2 | 0 | 4 | 0 | 0 | 0 | — | | — | | 6 | 0 |
| Mirassol | 2022 | Série C | 8 | 0 | 6 | 1 | 0 | 0 | — | | — | | 14 | 1 |
| Mirassol | Total | | 31 | 0 | 14 | 1 | 0 | 0 | — | | — | | 45 | 1 |
| Botafogo-PB (loan) | 2023 | Série C | 0 | 0 | 6 | 1 | 0 | 0 | — | | 0 | 0 | 6 | 1 |
| Aparecidense | 2023 | Série C | 9 | 1 | — | | — | | — | | — | | 9 | 1 |
| Aparecidense | 2024 | Série C | 0 | 0 | 0 | 0 | 0 | 0 | — | | — | | 0 | 0 |
| Aparecidense | Total | | 9 | 1 | 0 | 0 | 0 | 0 | — | | — | | 9 | 1 |
| Career total | | | 40 | 1 | 20 | 2 | 0 | 0 | 0 | 0 | 0 | 0 | 60 | 3 |
