= Marlon Santos (footballer, born 2005) =

Brazilian footballer

Marlon
Personal information
- Full name: Marlon Santos Teodoro
- Date of birth: 11 January 2005 (age 21)
- Place of birth: Viçosa, Brazil
- Height: 1.75 m (5 ft 9 in)
- Position: Forward

Team information
- Current team: Juventude
- Number: 98

Youth career
- Palestra Estrelas
- VEL
- Ubaense
- 2022: Inter de Minas
- 2023–: Juventude

Senior career*
Years	Team	Apps	(Gls)
2024–	Juventude	1	(0)
2024	→ Brasil de Farroupilha (loan)	3	(0)
- * Club domestic league appearances and goals as of 15:16, 8 August 2025 (UTC)

Marlon Santos Teodoro (born 11 January 2005), known as Marlon Santos or just Marlon, is a Brazilian footballer who plays as a forward for Juventude.

== Career ==
Born in Viçosa, Minas Gerais, Marlon began his career with hometown side Associação Palestra Estrelas at the age of six. He subsequently played for local sides Viçosa Esporte e Lazer, Associação Esportiva Ubaense and Inter de Minas before joining the youth sides of Juventude in 2022.

On 2 February 2024, Marlon signed his first professional contract with Juventude. In May, he was loaned to Brasil de Farroupilha for the year's Campeonato Gaúcho Série A2, and returned to his parent club in July after three appearances.

Marlon played for the under-20 side of Ju, and made his first team – and Série A – debut on 4 August 2025, coming on as a late substitute for Ênio in a 3–1 away loss to Santos.

== Career statistics ==
As of 5 August 2025

Club	Season	League			State League		Cup		Continental		Other		Total	
Club	Season	Division	Apps	Goals	Apps	Goals	Apps	Goals	Apps	Goals	Apps	Goals	Apps	Goals
Juventude	2024	Série A	0	0	0	0	—		—		1 (Note: Appearance(s) in Copa FGF)	0	1	0
Juventude	2025	Série A	1	0	0	0	0	0	—		—		1	0
Juventude	Total		1	0	0	0	0	0	—		1	0	2	0
Brasil de Farroupilha (loan)	2024	Gaúcho Série A2	—		3	0	—		—		—		3	0
Career total			1	0	3	0	0	0	0	0	1	0	5	0
