= Cuiabano =

Brazilian footballer (born 2003)

Personal information
- Full name: Luis Eduardo Soares da Silva
- Date of birth: 16 February 2003 (age 23)
- Place of birth: Cuiabá, Brazil
- Height: 1.79 m (5 ft 10 in)
- Position: Left-back

Team information
- Current team: Vasco da Gama (on loan from Nottingham Forest)
- Number: 66

Youth career
- 2014–2023: Grêmio

Senior career*
Years	Team	Apps	(Gls)
2023–2024	Grêmio	15	(1)
2024–2025	Botafogo	42	(6)
2025–	Nottingham Forest	0	(0)
2025	→ Botafogo (loan)	17	(3)
2026–	→ Vasco da Gama (loan)	16	(2)
- * Club domestic league appearances and goals as of 20:40, 27 August 2026 (UTC)

Luis Eduardo Soares da Silva (born 16 February 2003), commonly known as Cuiabano, is a Brazilian professional footballer who plays as a left-back for Vasco da Gama, on loan from Nottingham Forest.

== Career ==
=== Grêmio ===
Born in Cuiabá, Mato Grosso, Cuiabano joined Grêmio's youth sides in 2014, aged 11. On 15 July 2022, amidst interest from Major League Soccer sides Orlando City and Charlotte FC, he renewed his contract until December 2024.

Cuiabano made his first team debut on 18 February 2023, starting in a 0–0 Campeonato Gaúcho away draw against São Luiz. His first Série A appearance occurred on 21 May, as he came on as a second-half substitute for fellow youth graduate Bitello in a 3–1 home win over rivals Internacional.

=== Botafogo ===
On 20 April 2024, Botafogo announced the signing of Cuiabano on a contract until the end of 2027.

During the 2025 season, Cuiabano played a key role in the Alvinegro squad. He made 47 appearances, recording six goals and five assists—numbers that reflect the left-back's offensive evolution and the confidence he gained throughout the year. Deployed with more freedom to attack, the player stood out for his intensity, his ability to join the final third, and his versatility.

=== Nottingham Forest ===
On 1 September 2025, Cuiabano signed with Premier League club Nottingham Forest on a four-year contract. On 4 September, he rejoined Botafogo on loan for the remainder of the 2025 season.

== Career statistics ==
As of 9 November 2025

Appearances and goals by club, season and competition
Club	Season	League			State league (Note: Includes Campeonato Gaúcho, Campeonato Carioca)		National cup (Note: Includes Copa do Brasil, FA Cup)		Continental		Other		Total	
Club	Season	Division	Apps	Goals	Apps	Goals	Apps	Goals	Apps	Goals	Apps	Goals	Apps	Goals
Grêmio	2023	Série A	11	1	1	0	2	1	—		—		14	2
Grêmio	2024	Série A	2	0	1	0	—		1 (Note: Appearance(s) in Copa Libertadores)	0	—		4	0
Grêmio	Total		13	1	2	0	2	1	1	0	—		18	2
Botafogo	2024	Série A	23	4	—		4	0	2	0	1 (Note: Appearance in FIFA Intercontinental Cup)	0	30	4
Botafogo	2025	Série A	13	2	6	0	2	0	4	1	5 (Note: One appearance in Recopa Sudamericana; Four appearances in FIFA Club World Cup)	0	30	3
Botafogo	Total		36	6	6	0	6	0	6	1	6	0	60	7
Nottingham Forest	2025–26	Premier League	0	0	—		0	0	—		—		0	0
Botafogo (loan)	2025	Série A	14	2	—		0	0	—		—		14	2
Career total			63	9	8	0	8	1	7	1	6	0	92	11

== Honours ==
Grêmio

- Recopa Gaúcha: 2023
- Campeonato Gaúcho: 2024

Botafogo

- Copa Libertadores: 2024
- Campeonato Brasileiro Série A: 2024
