= Juan Christian =

Brazilian footballer (born 2001)

Personal information
- Full name: Juan Christian Pereira Coelho
- Date of birth: 10 March 2001 (age 25)
- Place of birth: São Bernardo do Campo, Brazil
- Height: 1.77 m (5 ft 10 in)
- Position: Forward

Team information
- Current team: Juventude (on loan from Riga)
- Number: 70

Youth career
- 2017–2018: São Bernardo
- 2019: Club Athletico Paranaense

Senior career*
Years	Team	Apps	(Gls)
2020–2023	Azuriz	21	(1)
2021	→ Grêmio (loan)	0	(0)
2022	→ Al Hamriyah (loan)	9	(3)
2022–2023	→ Cruzeiro (loan)	6	(0)
2023–2024	Vila Nova	45	(6)
2024–2025	Alanyaspor	5	(0)
2025–2026	Cuiabá	38	(6)
2026	Juventude	7	(2)
2026–	Riga	17	(2)
2026–	→ Juventude (loan)	8	(1)
- * Club domestic league appearances and goals as of 17 November 2026

Juan Christian Pereira Coelho (born 10 March 2001), known as Juan Christian, is a Brazilian professional footballer who plays as a forward for Juventude, on loan from Latvian Higher League club Riga.

== Club career ==
=== Grêmio ===
Born in São Bernardo do Campo, Brazil, Juan Coelho joined Grêmio's Academy on loan from Azuriz at the age of 20 in 2021.

=== Cuiabá ===
On 24 February 2025, Juan Christian returned to Brazil and signed with Cuiabá until the end of 2027.

== Career statistics ==
=== Club ===
As of 2 June 2021.

Appearances and goals by club, season and competition
Club	Season	League			National Cup		Continental		Other		Total	
Club	Season	Division	Apps	Goals	Apps	Goals	Apps	Goals	Apps	Goals	Apps	Goals
Azuriz	2020	State	—		—		—		10 (Note: Appearance(s) in Campeonato Paranaense 2ª Divisão.)	0	10	0
Azuriz	2021	State	—		—		—		11 (Note: Appearance(s) in Campeonato Paranaense.)	1	11	1
Azuriz	Total		0	0	0	0	0	0	21	1	21	1
Grêmio (loan)	2021	Série A	—		—		—		—		0	0
Grêmio (loan)	Total		0	0	0	0	0	0	0	0	0	0
Career total			0	0	0	0	0	0	21	1	21	1

== Honours ==
Azuriz

- Campeonato Paranaense 2ª Divisão: 2020
