= Cristhian Loor =

Ecuadorian footballer (born 2006)

Personal information
- Full name: Cristhian Joel Loor Santamaría
- Date of birth: 9 March 2006 (age 20)
- Place of birth: La Concordia, Ecuador
- Height: 1.88 m (6 ft 2 in)
- Position: Goalkeeper

Team information
- Current team: Botafogo
- Number: 40

Youth career
- 2023–2025: Independiente del Valle

Senior career*
Years	Team	Apps	(Gls)
2023–2024	Independiente del Valle	0	(0)
2024	→ Independiente Juniors (loan)	1	(0)
2025–	Botafogo	0	(0)

International career^{‡}
2023	Ecuador U17	13	(0)
2023–	Ecuador U20	3	(0)
2024–	Ecuador U23	0	(0)
- * Club domestic league appearances and goals as of 9 April 2024 ‡ National team caps and goals as of 5 August 2025

Cristhian Joel Loor Santamaría (born 9 March 2006) is an Ecuadorian professional footballer who plays as a goalkeeper for Campeonato Brasileiro Série A club Botafogo.

== Club career ==
=== Independiente del Valle ===
Loor was promoted to the first team of Independiente del Valle after participating in the 2025 South American U-20 Championship with Ecuador. Though he did not make any senior appearances, he was registered in professional competitions and was part of the squad that won the 2023 Recopa Sudamericana.

=== Botafogo ===
On 7 June 2025, Loor was officially announced as a new signing by Botafogo, joining on a contract valid until the end of 2028.

== International career ==
=== Youth ===
Loor was Ecuador's starting goalkeeper at the 2023 South American U-17 Championship, where the team finished runners-up.

He was later included in the squads for the 2023 FIFA U-20 World Cup and the 2024 CONMEBOL Pre-Olympic Tournament for the U23 team.

On 5 January 2025, he was called up again for the 2025 South American U-20 Championship in Venezuela.

== Career statistics ==
As of match played 9 April 2024

Appearances and goals by club, season and competition
Club	Season	League			Cup		Continental		State League		Other		Total	
Club	Season	Division	Apps	Goals	Apps	Goals	Apps	Goals	Apps	Goals	Apps	Goals	Apps	Goals
Independiente Juniors	2024	Ecuadorian Serie B	1	0	0	0	0	0	0	0	0	0	1	0
Career total			1	0	0	0	0	0	0	0	0	0	1	0

== Honours ==
Independiente del Valle

- Recopa Sudamericana: 2023
