= Raí (footballer, born 2002) =

Brazilian footballer

Personal information
- Full name: Raí da Silva Pessanha
- Date of birth: 21 April 2002 (age 24)
- Place of birth: Rio de Janeiro, Brazil
- Height: 1.74 m (5 ft 9 in)
- Position: Midfielder

Team information
- Current team: Juventude
- Number: 75

Youth career
- 2015–2022: Botafogo

Senior career*
Years	Team	Apps	(Gls)
2022–2025	Botafogo	24	(3)
2024	→ CRB (loan)	7	(0)
2025	→ Boavista SC (loan)	10	(1)
2025	→ Volta Redonda (loan)	31	(1)
2026–	Juventude	37	(10)
- * Club domestic league appearances and goals as of 16 November 2026

Raí da Silva Pessanha (born 21 April 2002), simply known as Raí, is a Brazilian footballer who plays as a midfielder for Juventude.

== Club career ==
Born in the neighborhood of Maré, Rio de Janeiro, Raí joined Botafogo in 2015, aged 13. After impressing with the under-20s in the 2022 Copa São Paulo de Futebol Júnior, he made his first team debut on 30 January of that year, coming on as a late substitute for Breno in a 2–0 Campeonato Carioca home win over Bangu.

Raí scored his first senior goal on 3 February 2022, scoring his team's fourth in a 4–2 home win over Madureira.

== Career statistics ==
As of 21 March 2023.

Club	Season	League			State League		Cup		Continental		Other		Total	
Club	Season	Division	Apps	Goals	Apps	Goals	Apps	Goals	Apps	Goals	Apps	Goals	Apps	Goals
Botafogo	2022	Série A	0	0	9	1	0	0	—		—		9	1
Botafogo	2023	Série A	0	0	4	0	0	0	0	0	—		4	0
Career total			0	0	13	1	0	0	0	0	0	0	13	1
