= Kayke (footballer, born 2006) =

Brazilian footballer

Personal information
- Full name: Kayke Gouvêa Queiroz
- Date of birth: 19 June 2006 (age 20)
- Place of birth: Itaperuna, Brazil
- Height: 1.78 m (5 ft 10 in)
- Position: Forward

Team information
- Current team: Kawasaki Frontale (on loan from Botafogo)
- Number: 93

Youth career
- 2019–: Botafogo

Senior career*
Years	Team	Apps	(Gls)
2025–	Botafogo	11	(3)
2025–2026	→ Fortaleza (loan)	11	(1)
2026–	→ Kawasaki Frontale (loan)	0	(0)
- * Club domestic league appearances and goals as of 7 November 2025

Kayke Gouvêa Queiroz (born 19 June 2006), simply known as Kayke, is a Brazilian professional footballer who plays as forward for Kawasaki Frontale, on loan from Botafogo.

== Career ==
Kayke arrived at Botafogo FR in the under-13 category in 2019, carrying out his entire development process in the club's youth sectors. In 2025 he was promoted to the main team at just 18 years old, playing in the last minutes of the defeat against Maricá FC on 11 January. Kayke scored his first goal as a professional three days after, in the match against Portuguesa.

In August 2025, Kayke was loaned to Fortaleza, with a contract until June 2026.

== Honours ==
Botafogo

- Copa Libertadores: 2024

Botafogo U20

- Torneio Otávio Pinto Guimarães: 2024
- Dallas Cup: 2025
