= Volta Redonda FC =

Brazilian association football club based in Volta Redonda, Rio de Janeiro, Brazil

Volta Redonda
- Full name: Volta Redonda Futebol Clube
- Nicknames: Voltaço; Esquadrão de Aço (Steel Squadron)
- Founded: 9 February 1976; 50 years ago
- Ground: Estádio Raulino de Oliveira
- Capacity: 20,255
- President: Flávio Horta
- Head coach: Neto Colucci
- League: Campeonato Brasileiro Série C Campeonato Carioca
- 2025 2025: Série B, 19th of 20 (relegated); Carioca, 3rd of 12
Home colors	Away colors	Third colors

Volta Redonda Futebol Clube, commonly referred to as Volta Redonda, is a Brazilian professional club based in Volta Redonda, Rio de Janeiro.

Founded on 9 February 1976. It will compete in the Campeonato Brasileiro Série C, the third tier of Brazilian football, in 2026. It will also compete in the Campeonato Carioca, the top flight of the Rio de Janeiro state football league.

The club has spent a majority of its history in the second and third tiers of Brazilian football, with their most important title being the 2024 Serie C.

== History ==
=== Foundation ===
In 1975, the only professional team of the city of Volta Redonda was Clube de Regatas do Flamengo of Volta Redonda (not be confused with Clube de Regatas do Flamengo of Rio de Janeiro city), commonly known as Flamenguinho, and Guarani Esporte Clube. In the same year, the states of Rio de Janeiro and Guanabara fused. Because of the fusion of the two states, the Federação Carioca de Futebol ("Carioca Football Federation", Rio de Janeiro city football federation) and Federação Fluminense de Desportos ("Fluminense Sporting Federation", federation of the interior cities of today's Rio de Janeiro state) also fused.

At a meeting between the president of Companhia Siderúrgica Nacional (CSN), Volta Redonda city mayor Nelson Gonçalves, Doctor Guanayr and Admiral Heleno Nunes (president of CBD, Confederação Brasileira de Desportos), Doctor Guanayr defended the idea that Flamenguinho should represent the city in Campeonato Carioca, but Admiral Heleno Nunes decided that a new club should be created with the name Volta Redonda Futebol Clube and the team colors should be the same colors of Volta Redonda Municipality: black, yellow and white.

On 9 February 1976, Volta Redonda Futebol Clube was officially founded, and their first season was in the 1976 Série A, where they finished 35th out of 54 teams.

The club won their first Copa Rio in 1994, winning the following edition as well. In 1995, the club finished runner-up in Serie C, losing the finals to XV de Novembro (Piracicaba). From 1996 to 1998 the club participated in Serie B, until being relegated to the 1999 Serie C.

=== 2005 Campeonato Carioca ===
In 2005, the club won the Taça Guanabara (the first turn of Campeonato Carioca), after defeating strong teams such as Vasco da Gama. This title qualified the team to play in the finals of Campeonato Carioca, against the winners of Taça Rio (the second turn of Campeonato Carioca), Fluminense. In the first match, Volta Redonda beat Fluminense by 4–3, needing only a draw in the second match to win the competition. However, the second match ended 3–1 to Fluminense, and Fluminense won the title 6–5 on aggregate.

=== 2006 Copa do Brasil ===
In 2006, Volta Redonda reached the quarterfinals of Copa do Brasil. In the first stage, the club beat América Mineiro. In the second stage, Volta Redonda defeated first division club Atlético Paranaense. In the third stage, 15 de Novembro of Campo Bom was beaten by Volta Redonda. On 4 May, at Estádio São Januário, Volta Redonda was defeated by Vasco da Gama 2–1 and eliminated of the competition where Vasco was later a finalist. In the first leg, played on 27 April, Volta Redonda and Vasco drew 0–0, concluding their best Copa do Brasil campaign.

=== 2016 Campeonato Brasileiro Série D ===
In 2016, Volta Redonda rose with one of the most impressive campaigns in the Série D, beating Fluminense de Feira twice and finishing undefeated, thus gaining access to the 2017 Série C. In the finals, they beat CSA 4–0.

In 2022, Volta Redonda won the Copa Rio for the first time in 15 years, gaining access to the 2023 Copa do Brasil.

In 2024, Volta Redonda began the year poorly, finishing 10th out of 12 in the Campeonato Carioca. However, the team had an excellent campaign in the league and secured prompotion to the Série B on 29 September after a 26-year absence.

== Stadium ==
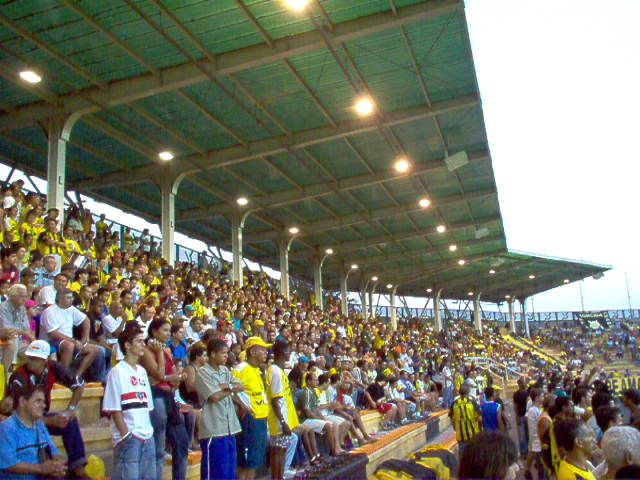
Estádio Raulino de Oliveira

Volta Redonda's stadium is the Estádio Raulino de Oliveira. The stadium has a maximum capacity of 20,255 people.

== Rivalries ==
Matches between Volta Redonda and Barra Mansa, its biggest rival, are called the Clássico do Sul Fluminense (Rio de Janeiro's South derby).

== Players ==
=== Current squad ===
As of 1 September 2026

Note: Flags indicate national team as defined under FIFA eligibility rules; some limited exceptions apply. Players may hold more than one non-FIFA nationality.

No.	Pos.	Nation	Player
1	GK	BRA	Avelino
2	DF	BRA	Wellington Silva
3	DF	BRA	Lucas Adell
4	DF	BRA	Fabrício
5	MF	BRA	Bruno Barra
6	DF	BRA	Jean Victor
7	FW	BRA	Marquinhos
8	MF	BRA	Dener
9	FW	COL	Yamilo Zuniga
10	MF	BRA	Luciano Naninho
11	MF	BRA	Bernardo Carvalho
12	GK	BRA	Heitor Silva
13	DF	BRA	Alan Ferreira
14	FW	BRA	Matheus Régis

No.	Pos.	Nation	Player
15	DF	BRA	Lucas Rocha
16	MF	BRA	Du Fernandes
17	MF	BRA	Wagninho
19	FW	BRA	Andrey (on loan from Nova Iguaçu)
20	DF	BRA	Juninho
21	MF	BRA	Henrique Silva
22	FW	BRA	Levi (on loan from Rio Branco)
23	FW	BRA	Wendel
25	MF	BRA	Juliano Fabro
28	FW	BRA	Rafael Furtado
29	MF	BRA	Caetano
30	MF	BRA	Juninho Ramos
45	GK	BRA	Deivity

=== Other players under contract ===
Note: Flags indicate national team as defined under FIFA eligibility rules; some limited exceptions apply. Players may hold more than one non-FIFA nationality.

No.	Pos.	Nation	Player
—	GK	BRA	Antônio Carlos (on loan from Fluminense U20)
—	GK	BRA	Guilherme Nunes
—	MF	BRA	Patrick

No.	Pos.	Nation	Player
—	MF	BRA	Matheus Pedro (on loan from Fluminense U20)
—	MF	BRA	Maxsuel (on loan from Fluminense U20)
—	FW	BRA	Heliardo

=== Out on loan ===
Note: Flags indicate national team as defined under FIFA eligibility rules; some limited exceptions apply. Players may hold more than one non-FIFA nationality.

No.	Pos.	Nation	Player
3	DF	BRA	Gabriel Pinheiro (at Juventude until 31 December 2026)
14	DF	BRA	Rafael Castro (at CSA until 31 December 2026)
27	FW	BRA	Ygor Catatau (at CRB until 31 December 2026)

No.	Pos.	Nation	Player
31	MF	BRA	Adsson (at Piauí until 31 December 2026)
37	DF	BRA	Gabriel Bahia (at Grêmio Novorizontino until 31 December 2026)

== Honours ==
=== Official tournaments ===
National
Competitions	Titles	Seasons
Campeonato Brasileiro Série C	1	2024
Campeonato Brasileiro Série D	1	2016
State
Competitions	Titles	Seasons
Copa Rio	5	1994, 1995, 1999, 2007, 2022
Campeonato Carioca Série A2	4	1987, 1990, 2004, 2022

- record

=== Others tournaments ===
==== State ====
- Taça Guanabara (1): 2005
- Taça Rio (1): 2016
- Taça Independência (1): 2020
- Campeonato do Interior Copa Rio stage (2): 1994, 1995
- Taça Santos Dumont (1): 2022

=== Runners-up ===
- Campeonato Brasileiro Série C (1): 1995
- Campeonato Carioca (1): 2005

=== Women's Football ===
- Campeonato Carioca de Futebol Feminino (1): 2009
