= 2016 Sport Club Corinthians Paulista season =

Corinthians
2016 season
- President: Roberto de Andrade
- Manager: Tite (until June 15); Fábio Carille (caretaker, June 15 – 19); Cristóvão Borges (June 19 – September 17); Fábio Carille (interim, September 17 – October 14); Oswaldo de Oliveira (from October 14)
- Stadium: Arena Corinthians
- Série A: 7th
- Copa do Brasil: Quarter-finals
- Campeonato Paulista: Semi-finals
- Copa Libertadores: Round of 16
- Top goalscorer: League: Guilherme; Marlone (6 each); All: Ángel Romero (13)
- Highest home attendance: 43,596 vs Nacional (4 May 2016)
- Lowest home attendance: 17,371 vs Atlético Mineiro (5 October 2016)
- Average home league attendance: 29,109
Home colors	Away colors	Third colors

The 2016 season was the 107th season in the history of Sport Club Corinthians Paulista.

== Background ==
=== Kit ===
- Home (May 2016 onward): White shirt, black shorts and white socks;
- Away (2016): Black shirt, white shorts and black socks;
- Third (September 2016 onward): Purple/blue shirt, blue shorts and blue socks.

=== Previous kits ===
- Home (Until May 2016): White shirt, black shorts and white socks.
- Third (Until September 2016): Orange shirt, orange shorts and orange socks.

=== Squad ===
As of 20 November 2016

Note: Flags indicate national team as defined under FIFA eligibility rules; some limited exceptions apply. Players may hold more than one non-FIFA nationality.

No.	Pos.	Nation	Player
1	GK	BRA	Matheus Vidotto
3	DF	BRA	Yago
4	DF	PAR	Fabián Balbuena
6	DF	BRA	Uendel
8	MF	BRA	Marlone
9	FW	BRA	Gustavo
10	MF	BRA	Guilherme
11	FW	PAR	Ángel Romero
12	GK	BRA	Cássio
13	DF	BRA	Guilherme Arana
14	DF	BRA	Léo Santos
15	DF	BRA	Vilson
16	MF	BRA	Cristian
17	MF	BRA	Giovanni Augusto
18	FW	BRA	Léo Jabá
19	FW	BRA	Rildo (on loan from Ponte Preta)
20	MF	BRA	Danilo

No.	Pos.	Nation	Player
21	MF	BRA	Jean
22	MF	BRA	Marciel
23	DF	BRA	Fagner
25	FW	BRA	Carlinhos
26	MF	BRA	Rodriguinho
27	GK	BRA	Walter
28	FW	BRA	Isaac (on loan from Botafogo-SP)
29	MF	BRA	Camacho
30	FW	BRA	Lucca
31	MF	BRA	Marquinhos Gabriel
32	DF	BRA	Léo Príncipe
33	MF	BRA	Warian
34	DF	BRA	Pedro Henrique
35	MF	BRA	Guilherme Mantuan
36	FW	BRA	Bruno Paulo
40	GK	BRA	Caíque França
—	DF	BRA	Vinícius Del'Amore

=== Managerial changes ===
On 15 June, Tite accepted an invitation to become Brazil's manager. Assistant manager Fábio Carille assumed the role as a caretaker until 19 June, managing the club against Fluminense and Botafogo. On the same day, Corinthians announced Cristóvão Borges as the new manager.

On 17 September, Borges was fired after losing a home match against Corinthians's biggest rival Palmeiras, which ended a 34-match unbeaten run at Arena Corinthians. On the same day, Carille was announced as interim manager. This time, until the end of the season. However, on 14 October it was announced that former two-time manager Oswaldo de Oliveira signed as the new head coach.

Manager	Signed from	Date of signing	Date of departure	Signed with	Source
(Brazil) Tite	Free agent	15 December 2014	15 June 2016	Brazil	
(Brazil) Fábio Carille	Technical staff (caretaker)	15 June 2016	19 June 2016	–	
(Brazil) Cristóvão Borges	Free agent	19 June 2016	17 September 2016	–	
(Brazil) Fábio Carille	Technical staff (interim)	17 September 2016	14 October 2016	–	
(Brazil) Oswaldo de Oliveira	(Brazil) Sport Recife	14 October 2016	–	–	

=== Transfers ===
==== Transfers in ====
#	Position:	Player	Transferred from	Fee	Date	Team	Source
29	MF	(Brazil) Alan Mineiro	(Brazil) Ferroviária	Undisclosed (~R$ 1,000,000)	9 December 2015	First team	
8	MF	(Brazil) Marlone	(Brazil) Penapolense	Undisclosed	21 December 2015	First team	
42	GK	(Brazil) Douglas	(Brazil) Capivariano	Undisclosed	6 January 2016	First team	
10	MF	(Brazil) Guilherme	(Turkey) Antalyaspor	€1,300,000 (~R$ 5,700,000)	19 January 2016	First team	
17	MF	(Brazil) Giovanni Augusto	(Brazil) Atlético Mineiro	Undisclosed	4 February 2016	First team	
9	FW	(Brazil) André	(Brazil) Atlético Mineiro	Undisclosed	5 February 2016	First team	
4	DF	(Paraguay) Fabián Balbuena	(Paraguay) Libertad	US$1,500,000 (~R$ 5,800,000)	15 February 2016	First team	
31	MF	(Brazil) Marquinhos Gabriel	(Saudi Arabia) Al Nassr	US$3,000,000 (~R$ 10,000,000)	18 April 2016	First team	
30	FW	(Brazil) Lucca	(Brazil) Criciúma	Undisclosed (~R$ 4,500,000)	10 May 2016	First team	
29	MF	(Brazil) Camacho	(Brazil) Osasco Audax	Free transfer (End of contract)	23 May 2016	First team	
36	FW	(Brazil) Bruno Paulo	(Brazil) Osasco Audax	Free transfer (End of contract)	24 May 2016	First team	
15	DF	(Brazil) Vilson	(Brazil) SEV Hortolândia	R$500,000	7 July 2016	First team	
9	FW	(Brazil) Gustavo	(Brazil) Criciúma	R$3,500,000	25 August 2016	First team	
21	MF	(Brazil) Jean	(Brazil) Paraná	R$400,000	25 August 2016	First team	

==== Loans in ====
#	Position	Player	Loaned from	Date	Loan expires	Team	Source
15	DF	(Brazil) Vilson	(Brazil) SEV Hortolândia	13 January 2016	31 December 2016 (Signed definitely on 7 July 2016)	First team	
5	MF	(Brazil) Willians	(Brazil) Cruzeiro	19 January 2016	31 December 2016 (Canceled on 20 November 2016)	First team	

==== Transfers out ====
#	Position	Player	Transferred to	Fee	Date	Team	Source
10	MF	(Brazil) Jádson	(China) Tianjin Quanjian	€5,000,000 (~R$21,200,000)	18 December 2015	First team	
2	DF	(Brazil) Edu Dracena	(Brazil) Palmeiras	Free Transfer (Rescinded contract)	22 December 2015	First team	
	MF	(Brazil) Vitor Júnior	(Saudi Arabia) Al-Qadisiyah	Free Transfer (End of contract)	31 December 2015	First team	
8	MF	(Brazil) Renato Augusto	(China) Beijing Guoan	€8,000,000 (~R$34,600,000)	6 January 2016	First team	
	FW	(Brazil) Paulo Victor	(Ukraine) Zorya Luhansk	Free Transfer (End of contract)	6 January 2016	First team	
5	MF	(Brazil) Ralf	(China) Beijing Guoan	€1,000,000 (~R$4,400,000)	7 January 2016	First team	
99	FW	(Brazil) Vágner Love	(France) Monaco	€1,000,000 (~R$4,400,000)	7 January 2016	First team	
4	DF	(Brazil) Gil	(China) Shandong Luneng	€10,000,000 (~R$43,000,000)	21 January 2016	First team	
21	FW	(Brazil) Malcom	(France) Bordeaux	€5,000,000 (~R$22,000,000)	31 January 2016	First team	
	FW	(Colombia) Brayan Riascos	Free agent	End of contract	20 April 2016	First team	
21	MF	(Brazil) Matheus Pereira	(Italy) Juventus	€2,500,000 (~R$9,300,000)	18 May 2016	First team	
2	DF	(Brazil) Edílson	(Brazil) Grêmio	R$1,000,000	19 May 2016	First team	
	GK	(Brazil) Renan	Free agent	End of contract	6 June 2016	First team	
	MF	(Brazil) Giovanni	Free agent	End of contract	10 June 2016	First team	
28	DF	(Brazil) Felipe	(Portugal) Porto	€6,200,000 (~R$24,000,000)	15 June 2016	First team	
	FW	(Brazil) Gustavo Tocantins	(Portugal) Estoril	Free Transfer (End of contract)	July 2016	First team	
	FW	(Brazil) Alexandre Pato	(Spain) Villarreal	Undisclosed (€3,000,000 ~R$10,800,000)	26 July 2016	First team	
9	FW	(Brazil) André	(Portugal) Sporting CP	Undisclosed (€1,000,000 ~R$3,600,000)	25 August 2016	First team	
25	MF	(Brazil) Bruno Henrique	(Italy) Palermo	Undisclosed (€3,300,000 ~R$11,880,000)	29 August 2016	First team	
7	MF	(Brazil) Elias	(Portugal) Sporting CP	€2,500,000 (~R$9,000,000)	31 August 2016	First team	

==== Loans out ====
#	Position	Player	Loaned to	Date	Loan expires	Team	Source
29	DF	(Brazil) Rodrigo Sam	(Brazil) Tigres do Brasil	December 2015	30 April 2016	First team	
	MF	(Brazil) PC	(United States) Fort Lauderdale Strikers	6 January 2016	Undisclosed	Academy	
	MF	(Brazil) Giovanni	(Brazil) Tigres do Brasil	7 January 2016	30 April 2016	First team	
	FW	(Brazil) Léo	(Brazil) Mogi Mirim	8 January 2016	30 April 2016	First team	
	DF	(Brazil) Rafael Castro	(Brazil) Chapecoense	13 January 2016	31 December 2016 (Canceled on 22 April 2016)	Academy	
22	MF	(Brazil) Marciel	(Brazil) Cruzeiro	19 January 2016	31 December 2016 (Returned on 12 September 2016)	First team	
	FW	(Brazil) Alexandre Pato	(England) Chelsea	29 January 2016	30 June 2016	First team	
	DF	(Brazil) Léo Príncipe	(Brazil) Oeste	3 February 2016	31 December 2016 (Returned on 15 May 2016)	Academy	
15	DF	(Brazil) Moisés	(Brazil) Bahia	13 February 2016	31 December 2016	First team	
14	MF	(Paraguay) Gustavo Viera	(Paraguay) Rubio Ñu	13 February 2016	31 December 2016	First team	
	FW	(Brazil) Gabriel Vasconcelos	(Brazil) America-RJ	16 February 2016	30 April 2016	First team	
	FW	(Brazil) Gustavo Tocantins	(Brazil) Portuguesa	24 February 2016	1 June 2016	First team	
92	FW	(Colombia) Stiven Mendoza	(United States) New York City	8 March 2016	31 December 2016	First team	
42	GK	(Brazil) Douglas	(Brazil) Grêmio	29 March 2016	31 December 2016 (Canceled on 15 September 2016)	First team	
	FW	(Brazil) Léo	(Brazil) Oeste	22 April 2016	31 December 2016	First team	
	DF	(Brazil) Rafael Castro	(Brazil) Oeste	22 April 2016	31 December 2016 (Canceled unknown)	Academy	
	DF	(Brazil) Rodrigo Sam	(Brazil) Bragantino	5 May 2016	31 December 2016	First team	
29	MF	(Brazil) Alan Mineiro	(Brazil) América-MG	24 May 2016	31 December 2016 (Canceled on 29 August 2016)	First team	
	DF	(Brazil) Guilherme Andrade	(Brazil) Bragantino	27 May 2016	31 December 2016	First team	
	FW	(Brazil) Gabriel Vasconcelos	(Brazil) Joinville	2 June 2016	31 December 2016 (Returned on 4 August 2016)	First team	
31	FW	(Brazil) Claudinho	(Brazil) Bragantino	3 June 2016	31 December 2016	First team	
22	MF	(Brazil) Maycon	(Brazil) Ponte Preta	14 July 2016	31 December 2016	First team	
18	FW	(Brazil) Luciano	(Spain) Leganés	24 August 2016	30 June 2017	First team	
	MF	(Brazil) Alan Mineiro	(Brazil) Bragantino	29 August 2016	31 December 2016	First team	
	DF	(Brazil) Rafael Castro	(Brazil) Ferroviária	Unknown	31 December 2016	Academy	

== Squad statistics ==
No.	Pos.	Name	Campeonato Paulista		Copa Libertadores		Campeonato Brasileiro		Copa do Brasil		Total		Discipline	
No.	Pos.	Name	Apps	Goals	Apps	Goals	Apps	Goals	Apps	Goals	Apps	Goals	Yellow card	Red card
1	GK	(Brazil) Matheus Vidotto	2	0	0	0	0	0	0	0	2	0	0	0
2	DF	(Brazil) Edílson	5 (2)	1	1 (2)	0	0	0	0	0	6 (4)	1	1	1
3	DF	(Brazil) Yago	12	1	7	0	14 (1)	0	3	0	36 (1)	1	7	1
4	DF	(Paraguay) Fabián Balbuena	6	2	1 (1)	0	29	0	4	0	40 (1)	2	7	1
5	MF	(Brazil) Willians	6 (3)	0	1 (3)	0	5 (6)	0	0 (3)	0	12 (15)	0	3	0
6	DF	(Brazil) Uendel	12	1	7	0	33	2	2	0	54	3	2	0
7	MF	(Brazil) Elias	6	0	4 (1)	2	8 (2)	1	0	0	18 (3)	3	5	0
8	MF	(Brazil) Marlone	1 (4)	0	1 (1)	2	15 (9)	6	3 (1)	0	20 (15)	8	1	0
9	FW	(Brazil) André	9 (3)	4	5 (1)	1	6 (5)	1	0	0	20 (9)	6	6	1
9	FW	(Brazil) Gustavo	0	0	0	0	4 (5)	0	0	0	4 (5)	0	1	0
10	MF	(Brazil) Guilherme	10 (1)	1	4	1	16 (10)	6	2	0	32 (11)	8	7	1
11	FW	(Paraguay) Ángel Romero	9 (8)	5	2 (4)	2	23 (4)	5	3	1	37 (16)	13	6	0
12	GK	(Brazil) Cássio	13	0	8	0	19 (2)	0	2	0	42 (2)	0	2	0
13	DF	(Brazil) Guilherme Arana	5 (1)	0	1	1	6 (4)	0	2	0	14 (5)	1	3	0
14	DF	(Brazil) Léo Santos	0	0	0	0	1	0	0	0	1	0	0	0
15	DF	(Brazil) Vilson	4	0	1	0	14	1	0	0	19	1	6	0
16	MF	(Brazil) Cristian	0 (1)	0	0 (1)	0	12 (2)	0	1 (1)	0	13 (5)	0	3	0
17	MF	(Brazil) Giovanni Augusto	8 (3)	2	5 (1)	1	27 (5)	3	3 (1)	0	43 (10)	6	7	1
18	FW	(Brazil) Luciano	4 (3)	0	2	0	10 (5)	1	0	0	16 (8)	1	4	0
18	FW	(Brazil) Léo Jabá	0	0	0	0	0 (2)	0	0	0	0 (2)	0	0	0
19	FW	(Brazil) Rildo	0	0	0	0	0 (7)	1	0 (2)	1	0 (9)	2	0	0
20	MF	(Brazil) Danilo	9 (5)	1	1 (3)	0	1 (5)	1	0	0	11 (13)	2	0	0
21	MF	(Brazil) Jean	0	0	0	0	0 (2)	0	0	0	0 (2)	0	0	0
22	MF	(Brazil) Maycon	6 (4)	1	2 (1)	0	0 (2)	0	0	0	8 (7)	1	0	0
22	MF	(Brazil) Marciel	0	0	0	0	1 (2)	0	0	0	1 (2)	0	1	0
23	DF	(Brazil) Fagner	12 (1)	2	7	0	33	1	3	0	55 (1)	3	12	1
25	MF	(Brazil) Bruno Henrique	12	0	7	0	21	4	0	0	40	4	5	0
25	FW	(Brazil) Carlinhos	0	0	0	0	0	0	0	0	0	0	0	0
26	MF	(Brazil) Rodriguinho	8 (2)	3	6	0	26 (3)	4	4	3	44 (5)	10	12	1
27	GK	(Brazil) Walter	2	0	0	0	19	0	2	0	23	0	1	0
28	DF	(Brazil) Felipe	12	2	7	0	7	0	0	0	26	2	5	0
28	FW	(Brazil) Isaac	0	0	0	0	0	0	0	0	0	0	0	0
29	MF	(Brazil) Alan Mineiro	3 (5)	2	1 (2)	0	0	0	0	0	4 (7)	2	1	0
29	MF	(Brazil) Camacho	0	0	0	0	13 (4)	1	4	0	17 (4)	1	1	0
30	FW	(Brazil) Lucca	11 (3)	4	7	2	7 (14)	3	0 (4)	0	25 (21)	9	7	0
31	FW	(Brazil) Claudinho	0 (1)	0	0	0	0	0	0	0	0 (1)	0	0	0
31	MF	(Brazil) Marquinhos Gabriel	0	0	0 (1)	1	32 (2)	5	4	0	36 (3)	6	3	0
32	DF	(Brazil) Léo Príncipe	0	0	0	0	5 (1)	1	1	0	6 (1)	1	2	1
33	MF	(Brazil) Warian	0	0	0	0	0	0	0	0	0	0	0	0
34	DF	(Brazil) Pedro Henrique	0	0	0	0	11 (2)	0	1	0	12 (2)	0	4	0
35	MF	(Brazil) Guilherme Mantuan	0	0	0	0	0	0	0	0	0	0	0	0
36	FW	(Brazil) Bruno Paulo	0	0	0	0	0	0	0	0	0	0	0	0
40	GK	(Brazil) Caíque França	0	0	0	0	0 (1)	0	0	0	0 (1)	0	0	0
-	DF	(Brazil) Vinícius Del'Amore	0	0	0	0	0	0	0	0	0	0	0	0

== Overview ==
Competition	First match	Last match	Starting round	Final position	Record							
Competition	First match	Last match	Starting round	Final position	Pld	W	D	L	GF	GA	GD	Win %
Série A	15 May 2016	11 December 2016	Matchday 1	7th	38	15	10	13	48	42	+6	39.47
Copa do Brasil	31 August 2016	19 October 2016	Round of 16	Quarter-Finals	4	2	1	1	6	6	+0	50.00
Campeonato Paulista	31 January 2016	23 April 2016	Matchday 1	Semi-Finals	17	12	3	2	32	10	+22	70.59
Copa Libertadores	17 February 2016	4 May 2016	Group stage	Round of 16	8	4	3	1	15	6	+9	50.00
Total					67	33	17	17	101	64	+37	49.25

Source: Competitions

== Pre-season and friendlies ==
17 January 2016 Florida Cup	Atlético Mineiro (Brazil)	1–0	(Brazil) Corinthians	Boca Raton, United States
14:00 UTC−05:00	Hyuri 57'	Report		Stadium: FAU Stadium; Referee: Marcos Cesar de Oliveira Filho

20 January 2016 Florida Cup	Corinthians (Brazil)	3–2	(Ukraine) Shakhtar Donetsk	Orlando, United States
19:45 UTC−05:00	Danilo 12'; Romero 35', 43'	Report	Taison 22'; Kovalenko 80'	Stadium: ESPN Wide World of Sports Complex; Referee: Guido Gonzales Jr.

23 January 2016 Friendly	Fort Lauderdale Strikers (United States)	0–0	(Brazil) Corinthians	Fort Lauderdale, United States
15:00 UTC−05:00		Report		Stadium: Lockhart Stadium; Attendance: 2,151; Referee: Marcos Cesar de Oliveira Filho

Last updated: 23 January 2016

== Campeonato Paulista ==
For the 2016 Campeonato Paulista, the 20 teams are divided in four groups of 5 teams (A, B, C, D). They will face all teams, except those that are in their own group, with the top two teams from each group qualifying for the quarterfinals. The six overall worst teams will be relegated.

=== Statistics ===
Group D
Pos	Team	Pld	W	D	L	GF	GA	GD	Pts	Qualification or relegation
1	Corinthians (Q)	15	11	2	2	26	8	+18	35	Advance to the quarter-finals
2	Red Bull Brasil (Q)	15	7	1	7	24	22	+2	22	Advance to the quarter-finals
3	Água Santa (R)	15	4	4	7	17	29	−12	16	Relegated
4	Mogi Mirim (R)	15	4	3	8	12	23	−11	15	Relegated
5	Rio Claro (R)	15	2	3	10	9	26	−17	9	Relegated

(Q) Qualified for the phase indicated; (R) Relegated

=== First stage ===
31 January 2016 1	Corinthians	1–0	XV de Piracicaba	São Paulo
17:00 UTC−03:00	Romero 90+1'	Report		Stadium: Arena Corinthians; Attendance: 31,309; Referee: Flávio Rodrigues de Souza

4 February 2016 2	Osasco Audax	0–1	Corinthians	Osasco
19:30 UTC−03:00		Report	Uendel 12'	Stadium: Estádio José Liberatti; Attendance: 6,399; Referee: Thiago Duarte Peixoto

11 February 2016 3	Corinthians	2–1	Capivariano	São Paulo
21:00 UTC−03:00	Romero 2'; Guilherme 46'	Report	Marllon 29'	Stadium: Arena Corinthians; Attendance: 23,397; Referee: Marcelo Aparecido Ribeiro de Souza

14 February 2016 4	Corinthians	2–0	São Paulo	São Paulo
17:00 UTC−03:00	Lucca 23'; Yago 85'	Report		Stadium: Arena Corinthians; Attendance: 36,788; Referee: Luiz Flávio de Oliveira

21 February 2016 5	Ferroviária	2–2	Corinthians	Araraquara
19:30 UTC−03:00	Juninho 28', 58'	Report	Lucca 50' (pen.); Giovanni Augusto 82'	Stadium: Arena da Fonte Luminosa; Attendance: 9,273; Referee: Flávio Rodrigues de Souza

24 February 2016 6	São Bento	1–1	Corinthians	Sorocaba
21:45 UTC−03:00	Rossi 21'	Report	André 88'	Stadium: Estádio Walter Ribeiro; Attendance: 8,156; Referee: Vinicius Gonçalves Dias Araújo

27 February 2016 7	Corinthians	1–0	Oeste	São Paulo
21:00 UTC−03:00	Rodriguinho 90'	Report		Stadium: Arena Corinthians; Attendance: 28,949; Referee: José Claudio Rocha Filho

6 March 2016 8	Santos	2–0	Corinthians	Santos
16:00 UTC−03:00	Ricardo Oliveira 8', 85'	Report		Stadium: Vila Belmiro; Attendance: 9,635; Referee: Flávio Rodrigues de Souza

13 March 2016 9	Botafogo	0–3	Corinthians	Ribeirão Preto
16:00 UTC−03:00		Report	Felipe 17'; Danilo 48'; Maycon 65'	Stadium: Estádio Santa Cruz; Attendance: 11,091; Referee: Rodrigo Guarizo Ferreira do Amaral

19 March 2016 10	Corinthians	4–0	Linense	São Paulo
16:00 UTC−03:00	Romero 7', 68'; Balbuena 14'; Edílson 56'	Report		Stadium: Arena Corinthians; Attendance: 31,334; Referee: Salim Fende Chavez

23 March 2016 11	São Bernardo	0–3	Corinthians	São Bernardo do Campo
21:00 UTC−03:00		Report	Rodriguinho 48', 54'; Lucca 74'	Stadium: Estádio Primeiro de Maio; Attendance: 7,263; Referee: Vinicius Gonçalves Dias Araújo

26 March 2016 12	Corinthians	1–0	Ituano	São Paulo
21:00 UTC−03:00	Felipe 87'	Report		Stadium: Arena Corinthians; Attendance: 28,753; Referee: Norberto Luciano Santos da Silveira

30 March 2016 13	Corinthians	2–1	Ponte Preta	São Paulo
21:45 UTC−03:00	Romero 26'; Balbuena 82'	Report	Felipe Azevedo 30'	Stadium: Arena Corinthians; Attendance: 22,401; Referee: Alessandro Darcie

3 April 2016 14	Palmeiras	1–0	Corinthians	São Paulo
16:00 UTC−03:00	Dudu 26'	Report		Stadium: Estádio do Pacaembu; Attendance: 22,663; Referee: Flávio Rodrigues de Souza

10 April 2016 15	Corinthians	3–0	Novorizontino	São Paulo
16:00 UTC−03:00	Fagner 40', 47'; Alan Mineiro 88'	Report		Stadium: Arena Corinthians; Attendance: 30,687; Referee: Douglas Marques das Flores

=== Knockout stages ===
16 April 2016 Quarter-finals	Corinthians	4–0	Red Bull Brasil	São Paulo
16:20 UTC−03:00	Giovanni Augusto 16'; André 39'; Alan Mineiro 56'; Lucca 68'	Report		Stadium: Arena Corinthians; Attendance: 37,340; Referee: Luiz Flávio de Oliveira

23 April 2016 Semi-finals	Corinthians	2–2 (1–4 p)	Osasco Audax	São Paulo
18:30 UTC−03:00	André 51', 78'	Report	Bruno Paulo 25'; Tchê Tchê 70'	Stadium: Arena Corinthians; Attendance: 41,626; Referee: Thiago Duarte Ribeiro
	Penalties
	André (penalty scored); Fagner (penalty missed); Rodriguinho (penalty missed)		(penalty scored) Velicka; (penalty scored) Tchê Tchê; (penalty scored) Ytalo; (penalty scored) Camacho

== Copa Libertadores ==
=== Second stage ===
Pos	Team	Pld	W	D	L	GF	GA	GD	Pts	Qualification
1	(Brazil) Corinthians (A)	6	4	1	1	13	4	+9	13	Final stages
2	(Paraguay) Cerro Porteño (A)	6	3	1	2	6	7	−1	10	Final stages
3	(Colombia) Santa Fe	6	2	2	2	6	4	+2	8	
4	(Chile) Cobresal	6	1	0	5	4	14	−10	3	

Source: CONMEBOL
Rules for classification: 1) points; 2) goal difference; 3) goals scored; 4) away goals scored; 5) drawing of lots.
(A) Advanced to the round of 16

17 February 2016 1	Cobresal (Chile)	0–1	(Brazil) Corinthians	El Salvador, Chile
20:45 UTC−3		Report	Escalona 90' (o.g.)	Stadium: Estadio El Cobre; Attendance: 3,167; Referee: Andrés Cunha (Uruguay)

2 March 2016 2	Corinthians (Brazil)	1–0	(Colombia) Santa Fe	São Paulo, Brazil
21:45 UTC−3	Guilherme 64'	Report		Stadium: Arena Corinthians; Attendance: 39,246; Referee: Mauro Vigliano (Argentina)

9 March 2016 3	Cerro Porteño (Paraguay)	3–2	(Brazil) Corinthians	Asunción, Paraguay
19:30 UTC−3	Beltrán 48', 81'; Díaz 75'	Report	André 12'; Giovanni Augusto 87' (pen.)	Stadium: Estadio Defensores del Chaco; Attendance: 13,431; Referee: Diego Haro (Peru)

16 March 2016 4	Corinthians (Brazil)	2–0	(Paraguay) Cerro Porteño	São Paulo, Brazil
21:45 UTC−3	Lucca 22'; Mareco 60' (o.g.)	Report		Stadium: Arena Corinthians; Attendance: 42,858; Referee: Patricio Loustau (Argentina)

6 April 2016 5	Santa Fe (Colombia)	1–1	(Brazil) Corinthians	Bogotá, Colombia
19:45 UTC−5	Otero 45+2'	Report	Elias 57'	Stadium: Estadio El Campín; Attendance: 21,983; Referee: Néstor Pitana (Argentina)

20 April 2016 6	Corinthians (Brazil)	6–0	(Chile) Cobresal	São Paulo, Brazil
21:45 UTC−3	Marlone 9', 39'; Romero 13', 77'; Arana 45'; Elias 75'	Report		Stadium: Arena Corinthians; Attendance: 42,090; Referee: Carlos Orbe (Ecuador)

=== Knockout stages ===
27 April 2016 Round of 16	Nacional (Uruguay)	0–0	(Brazil) Corinthians	Montevideo, Uruguay
21:45 UTC−3		Report		Stadium: Gran Parque Central; Referee: Patricio Loustau (Argentina)

4 May 2016 Round of 16	Corinthians (Brazil)	2–2	(Uruguay) Nacional	São Paulo, Brazil
21:45 UTC−3	Lucca 15'; Marquinhos Gabriel 90+4' (pen.)	Report	López 5'; Romero 57'	Stadium: Arena Corinthians; Attendance: 43,596; Referee: Néstor Pitana (Argentina)

Tied 2–2 on aggregate, Nacional won on away goals.

== Campeonato Brasileiro ==
Pos	Team	Pld	W	D	L	GF	GA	GD	Pts	Qualification or relegation
5	Botafogo	38	17	8	13	43	39	+4	59	Qualification for 2017 Copa Libertadores first stage
6	Atlético Paranaense	38	17	6	15	38	32	+6	57	Qualification for 2017 Copa Libertadores first stage
7	Corinthians	38	15	10	13	48	42	+6	55	Qualification for 2017 Copa Sudamericana
8	Ponte Preta	38	15	8	15	48	52	−4	53	Qualification for 2017 Copa Sudamericana
9	Grêmio	38	14	11	13	41	44	−3	53	Qualification for 2017 Copa Libertadores group stage

Source: CBF
Rules for classification: 1) points; 2) wins; 3) goal difference; 4) goals scored; 5) head-to-head results; 6) least red cards received; 7) least yellow cards received; 8) draw.

=== Results ===
15 May 2016 1	Corinthians	0–0	Grêmio	São Paulo
16:00 UTC−03:00		Report		Stadium: Arena Corinthians; Attendance: 31,905; Referee: Wilton Pereira Sampaio

22 May 2016 2	Vitória	3–2	Corinthians	Salvador
16:00 UTC−03:00	Leandro Domingues 29'; Marinho 56'; Kieza 64'	Report	Uendel 25'; Fagner 38'	Stadium: Barradão; Attendance: 12,417; Referee: Heber Roberto Lopes

26 May 2016 3	Corinthians	3–0	Ponte Preta	São Paulo
11:00 UTC−03:00	Kadu 14' (o.g.); Bruno Henrique 21'; Guilherme 79'	Report		Stadium: Arena Corinthians; Attendance: 35,857; Referee: Elmo Alves Resende Cunha

29 May 2016 4	Sport Recife	0–2	Corinthians	Recife
11:00 UTC−03:00		Report	Lucca 69'; Marquinhos Gabriel 78'	Stadium: Ilha do Retiro; Attendance: 16,331; Referee: Wagner Reway

1 June 2016 5	Corinthians	1–0	Santos	São Paulo
21:00 UTC−03:00	Giovanni Augusto 81'	Report		Stadium: Arena Corinthians; Attendance: 30,452; Referee: Leandro Vuaden

4 June 2016 6	Corinthians	2–1	Coritiba	São Paulo
20:30 UTC−03:00	André 90'; Uendel 90+5'	Report	Negueba 45+2'	Stadium: Arena Corinthians; Attendance: 27,206; Referee: Anderson Daronco

12 June 2016 7	Palmeiras	1–0	Corinthians	São Paulo
16:00 UTC−03:00	Cleiton Xavier 47'	Report		Stadium: Allianz Parque; Attendance: 39,935; Referee: Raphael Claus

16 June 2016 8	Fluminense	1–0	Corinthians	Brasília
20:00 UTC−03:00	Cícero 61'	Report		Stadium: Estádio Nacional Mané Garrincha; Attendance: 21,148; Referee: Ricardo Marques Ribeiro

19 June 2016 9	Corinthians	3–1	Botafogo	São Paulo
16:00 UTC−03:00	Bruno Henrique 23', 88'; Marquinhos Gabriel 52'	Report	Leandrinho 27'	Stadium: Arena Corinthians; Attendance: 35,024; Referee: Rodolpho Toski Marques

22 June 2016 10	Atlético Mineiro	2–1	Corinthians	Belo Horizonte
21:45 UTC−03:00	Fred 66'; Cazares 82'	Report	Lucca 89'	Stadium: Mineirão; Attendance: 34,426; Referee: Wilton Pereira Sampaio

25 June 2016 11	Corinthians	2–1	Santa Cruz	São Paulo
21:00 UTC−03:00	Luciano 26'; Romero 36'	Report	Grafite 52'	Stadium: Arena Corinthians; Attendance: 25,760; Referee: Wagner do Nascimento Magalhães

29 June 2016 12	América-MG	0–2	Corinthians	Belo Horizonte
21:45 UTC−03:00		Report	Romero 9'; Marquinhos Gabriel 74' (pen.)	Stadium: Estádio Independência; Attendance: 1,788; Referee: Wagner Reway

3 July 2016 13	Corinthians	4–0	Flamengo	São Paulo
16:00 UTC−03:00	Romero 59', 88'; Guilherme 77'; Rildo 79'	Report		Stadium: Arena Corinthians; Attendance: 32,960; Referee: Heber Roberto Lopes

9 July 2016 14	Chapecoense	0–2	Corinthians	Chapecó
16:30 UTC−03:00		Report	Rodriguinho 59'; Marquinhos Gabriel 90+1'	Stadium: Arena Condá; Attendance: 11,615; Referee: Ricardo Marques Ribeiro

17 July 2016 15	Corinthians	1–1	São Paulo	São Paulo
16:00 UTC−03:00	Bruno Henrique 21'	Report	Cueva 15' (pen.)	Stadium: Arena Corinthians; Attendance: 42,410; Referee: Péricles Bassols

23 July 2016 16	Corinthians	1–1	Figueirense	São Paulo
16:00 UTC−03:00	Danilo 83'	Report	Dodô 58'	Stadium: Arena Corinthians; Attendance: 38,769; Referee: Marielson Alves Silva

31 July 2016 17	Internacional	0–1	Corinthians	Porto Alegre
16:00 UTC−03:00		Report	Elias 41'	Stadium: Estádio Beira-Rio; Attendance: 34,222; Referee: Elmo Alves Resende Cunha

3 August 2016 18	Atlético Paranaense	2–0	Corinthians	Curitiba
21:45 UTC−03:00	Walter 76', 86'	Report		Stadium: Arena da Baixada; Attendance: 27,982; Referee: Anderson Daronco

8 August 2016 19	Corinthians	1–1	Cruzeiro	São Paulo
21:00 UTC−03:00	Giovanni Augusto 1'	Report	Ábila 65'	Stadium: Estádio do Pacaembu (Note: Corinthians played their home match against Cruzeiro at Estádio do Pacaembu due to Arena Corinthians being used as a venue in the 2016 Summer Olympics.); Attendance: 34,860; Referee: Dewson Fernando Freitas

14 August 2016 20	Grêmio	3–0	Corinthians	Porto Alegre
11:00 UTC−03:00	Pedro Rocha 16'; Everton 48'; Bolaños 61'	Report		Stadium: Arena do Grêmio; Attendance: 50,184; Referee: Braulio da Silva Machado

22 August 2016 21	Corinthians	2–1	Vitória	São Paulo
20:00 UTC−03:00	Marlone 50'; Marquinhos Gabriel 71'	Report	Yago 42' (o.g.)	Stadium: Arena Corinthians; Attendance: 20,473; Referee: Bruno Arleu de Araújo

27 August 2016 22	Ponte Preta	2–0	Corinthians	Campinas
16:00 UTC−03:00	Roger 35'; Clayson 50'	Report		Stadium: Estádio Moisés Lucarelli; Attendance: 8,529; Referee: Luiz Flávio de Oliveira

8 September 2016 23	Corinthians	3–0	Sport Recife	São Paulo
19:30 UTC−03:00	Rodriguinho 46'; Léo Príncipe 53'; Vilson 61'	Report		Stadium: Arena Corinthians; Attendance: 24,577; Referee: João Batista de Arruda

11 September 2016 24	Santos	2–1	Corinthians	Santos
16:00 UTC−03:00	Vitor Bueno 70' (pen.); Renato 85'	Report	Marlone 36'	Stadium: Vila Belmiro; Attendance: 8,610; Referee: Raphael Claus

14 September 2016 25	Coritiba	1–1	Corinthians	Curitiba
21:45 UTC−03:00	Leandro 27' (pen.)	Report	Marlone 14'	Stadium: Estádio Couto Pereira; Attendance: 12,803; Referee: Grazianni Maciel Rocha

17 September 2016 26	Corinthians	0–2	Palmeiras	São Paulo
16:00 UTC−03:00		Report	Moisés 4'; Mina 76'	Stadium: Arena Corinthians; Attendance: 40,173; Referee: Heber Roberto Lopes

25 September 2016 27	Corinthians	0–1	Fluminense	São Paulo
16:00 UTC−03:00		Report	Cícero 90+4'	Stadium: Arena Corinthians; Attendance: 19,183; Referee: Anderson Daronco

1 October 2016 28	Botafogo	2–0	Corinthians	Rio de Janeiro
16:30 UTC−03:00	Neílton 23'; Diogo Barbosa 38'	Report		Stadium: Arena Botafogo; Attendance: 9,123; Referee: Caio Max Augusto Vieira

5 October 2016 29	Corinthians	0–0	Atlético Mineiro	São Paulo
21:00 UTC−03:00		Report		Stadium: Arena Corinthians; Attendance: 17,371; Referee: Rodolpho Toski Marques

12 October 2016 30	Santa Cruz	2–4	Corinthians	Cuiabá
20:45 UTC−04:00	Grafite 29'; Keno 80'	Report	Guilherme 37', 54'; Marlone 47'; Lucca 90+1'	Stadium: Arena Pantanal; Attendance: 7,947; Referee: Grazianni Maciel Rocha

16 October 2016 31	Corinthians	2–0	América-MG	São Paulo
18:30 UTC−03:00	Romero 16'; Rodriguinho 38'	Report		Stadium: Arena Corinthians; Attendance: 25,965; Referee: Dewson Fernando Freitas da Silva

23 October 2016 32	Flamengo	2–2	Corinthians	Rio de Janeiro
17:00 UTC−03:00	Guerrero 14', 58'	Report	Guilherme 5'; Rodriguinho 45+1'	Stadium: Estádio do Maracanã; Attendance: 65,743; Referee: Anderson Daronco

29 October 2016 33	Corinthians	1–1	Chapecoense	São Paulo
16:30 UTC−03:00	Giovanni Augusto 74' (pen.)	Report	Bruno Rangel 83' (pen.)	Stadium: Arena Corinthians; Attendance: 25,399; Referee: Jean Pierre Gonçalves Lima

5 November 2016 34	São Paulo	4–0	Corinthians	São Paulo
19:30 UTC−03:00	Cueva 13' (pen.); David Neres 60'; Chávez 66'; Luiz Araújo 90+2'	Report		Stadium: Estádio do Morumbi; Attendance: 53,781; Referee: Claudio Francisco Lima e Silva

16 November 2016 35	Figueirense	1–1	Corinthians	Florianópolis
21:45 UTC−03:00	Rafael Moura 90+2'	Report	Camacho 43'	Stadium: Estádio Orlando Scarpelli; Attendance: 5,746; Referee: Anderson Daronco

21 November 2016 36	Corinthians	1–0	Internacional	São Paulo
20:00 UTC−03:00	Marlone 54' (pen.)	Report		Stadium: Arena Corinthians; Attendance: 19,769; Referee: Rodolpho Toski Marques

26 November 2016 37	Corinthians	0–0	Atlético Paranaense	São Paulo
21:00 UTC−03:00		Report		Stadium: Arena Corinthians; Attendance: 24,956; Referee: Leandro Vuaden

11 December 2016 38	Cruzeiro	3–2	Corinthians	Belo Horizonte
17:00 UTC−03:00 (Note: The game was originally scheduled for 4 December, but the last round of the league was postponed a week due to the LaMia Flight 2933 crash involving Chapecoense.)	De Arrascaeta 23'; Ezequiel 56'; Robinho 58'	Report	Guilherme 7'; Marlone 54'	Stadium: Mineirão; Referee: Wagner Reway

== Copa do Brasil ==
Due to being qualified to the 2016 Copa Libertadores, Corinthians entered the competition on the round of 16, in August.

=== Knockout stages ===
31 August 2016 Round of 16	Fluminense	1–1	Corinthians	Mesquita
21:45 UTC−03:00	Marquinho 36'	Report	Rodriguinho 62'	Stadium: Estádio Giulite Coutinho; Attendance: 7,420; Referee: Elmo Alves Resende Cunha

21 September 2016 Round of 16	Corinthians	1–0	Fluminense	São Paulo
21:45 UTC−03:00	Rodriguinho 68'	Report		Stadium: Arena Corinthians; Attendance: 20,999; Referee: Rodolpho Toski Marques

Corinthians won 2–1 on aggregate.

28 September 2016 Quarter-finals	Corinthians	2–1	Cruzeiro	São Paulo
21:45 UTC−03:00	Léo 46' (o.g.); Romero 53'	Report	Robinho 77'	Stadium: Arena Corinthians; Attendance: 19,180; Referee: Eduardo Tomaz de Aquino Valadão

19 October 2016 Quarter-finals	Cruzeiro	4–2	Corinthians	Belo Horizonte
21:45 UTC−03:00	Ábila 13', 58' (pen.); Bruno Rodrigo 62'; De Arrascaeta 82'	Report	Rodriguinho 34'; Rildo 85'	Stadium: Mineirão; Attendance: 35,069; Referee: Wilton Pereira Sampaio

Cruzeiro won 5–4 on aggregate.

== See also ==
- List of Sport Club Corinthians Paulista seasons
