= 2015 Sport Club Corinthians Paulista season =

Corinthians
2015 season
- President: Mário Gobbi (until February 8); Roberto de Andrade (from February 9)
- Manager: Tite
- Stadium: Arena Corinthians
- Série A: Winners
- Copa do Brasil: Round of 16
- Campeonato Paulista: Semi-finals
- Copa Libertadores: Round of 16
- Top goalscorer: League: Vágner Love (14); All: Jádson; Vágner Love (16 each)
- Highest home attendance: 45,469 vs São Paulo (22 November 2015)
- Lowest home attendance: 23,780 vs São Bernardo (11 March 2015)
- Average home league attendance: 34,414
| Home colors | Away colors | Third colors |

The 2015 season was the 106th season in the history of Sport Club Corinthians Paulista.

== Background ==
=== Kit ===
- Home (September 2015 onward): White shirt, black shorts and white socks;
- Away (November 2015 onward): Black shirt, white shorts and black socks;
- Third (September 2015 onward): Orange shirt, orange shorts and orange socks.

=== Previous kits ===
- Home (Until September 2015): White shirt, black shorts and white socks.
- Away (Until November 2015): Black shirt, white shorts and black socks;

=== Squad ===
As of 15 September 2015

Note: Flags indicate national team as defined under FIFA eligibility rules; some limited exceptions apply. Players may hold more than one non-FIFA nationality.

| No. | Pos. | Nation | Player |
|---|---|---|---|
| 1 | GK | BRA | Caíque França |
| 2 | DF | BRA | Edu Dracena |
| 3 | DF | BRA | Yago |
| 4 | DF | BRA | Gil |
| 5 | MF | BRA | Ralf |
| 6 | DF | BRA | Uendel |
| 7 | MF | BRA | Elias |
| 8 | MF | BRA | Renato Augusto |
| 9 | FW | BRA | Lincom (on loan from Bragantino) |
| 10 | MF | BRA | Jádson |
| 11 | FW | PAR | Ángel Romero |
| 12 | GK | BRA | Cássio |
| 13 | DF | BRA | Guilherme Arana |
| 14 | MF | PAR | Gustavo Viera |
| 15 | MF | BRA | Matheus Vargas |
| 16 | MF | BRA | Cristian |
| 18 | FW | BRA | Luciano |

| No. | Pos. | Nation | Player |
|---|---|---|---|
| 19 | MF | BRA | Matheus Pereira |
| 20 | MF | BRA | Danilo |
| 21 | FW | BRA | Malcom |
| 22 | MF | BRA | Marciel |
| 23 | DF | BRA | Fagner |
| 25 | MF | BRA | Bruno Henrique |
| 26 | MF | BRA | Rodriguinho |
| 27 | GK | BRA | Walter |
| 28 | DF | BRA | Felipe |
| 29 | DF | BRA | Rodrigo Sam |
| 30 | FW | BRA | Lucca (on loan from Criciúma) |
| 31 | FW | BRA | Rildo (on loan from Ponte Preta) |
| 32 | GK | BRA | Matheus Vidotto |
| 33 | DF | BRA | Edílson |
| 34 | DF | BRA | Pedro Henrique |
| 99 | FW | BRA | Vágner Love |

=== Transfers ===
==== Transfers in ====
| # | Position: | Player | Transferred from | Fee | Date | Team | Source |
|---|---|---|---|---|---|---|---|
| 30 | FW | (Colombia) Stiven Mendoza | (India) Chennaiyin | Free transfer (End of contract) | 19 December 2014 | First team | |
| 16 | MF | (Brazil) Cristian | Free agent | Free transfer | 3 January 2015 | First team | |
| 2 | DF | (Brazil) Edílson | Free agent | Free transfer | 5 January 2015 | First team | |
| 17 | DF | (Brazil) Edu Dracena | (Brazil) Santos | Free transfer | 22 January 2015 | First team | |
| 29 | FW | (Brazil) Vágner Love | (China) Shandong Luneng | Free transfer | 8 February 2015 | First team | |
| | DF | (Brazil) Moisés | (Brazil) Madureira | Undisclosed | 15 May 2015 | First team | |
| 17 | FW | (Brazil) Claudinho | (Brazil) Santos | Free transfer (End of contract) | 15 July 2015 | Academy | |
| | MF | (Brazil) Ameixa | (Brazil) Remo | Undisclosed | 24 July 2015 | Academy | |

==== Loans in ====
| # | Position | Player | Loaned from | Date | Loan expires | Team | Source |
|---|---|---|---|---|---|---|---|
| | FW | (Brazil) João Vitor | (Brazil) Bragantino | 21 June 2015 | 31 January 2016 | Academy | |
| 33 | FW | (Brazil) Rildo | (Brazil) Ponte Preta | 3 July 2015 | 31 December 2016 | First team | |
| | FW | (Brazil) Isaac | (Brazil) Botafogo-SP | 18 August 2015 | 31 December 2016 | Academy | |
| 9 | FW | (Brazil) Lincom | (Brazil) Bragantino | 14 September 2015 | 31 December 2015 | First team | |
| 30 | FW | (Brazil) Lucca | (Brazil) Criciúma | 15 September 2015 | 31 May 2016 | First team | |

==== Transfers out ====
| # | Position | Player | Transferred to | Fee | Date | Team | Source |
|---|---|---|---|---|---|---|---|
| 1 | GK | (Brazil) Júlio César | (Brazil) Náutico | Free transfer (End of contract) | 16 December 2014 | First team | |
| | MF | (Brazil) Douglas | (Brazil) Grêmio | Free transfer (Released) | 17 December 2014 | First team | |
| 22 | GK | (Brazil) Danilo Fernandes | (Brazil) Sport Recife | Free transfer (End of contract) | 5 January 2015 | First team | |
| 14 | MF | (Uruguay) Nicolás Lodeiro | (Argentina) Boca Juniors | R$7,500,000 | 5 February 2015 | First team | |
| 9 | FW | (Peru) Paolo Guerrero | (Brazil) Flamengo | Free transfer (End of contract/Released) | 27 May 2015 | First team | |
| 11 | FW | (Qatar) Emerson Sheik | (Brazil) Flamengo | Free transfer (End of contract/Released) | 12 June 2015 | First team | |
| 6 | DF | (Brazil) Fábio Santos | (Mexico) Cruz Azul | Undisclosed (~R$ 1,550,000) | 18 June 2015 | First team | |
| 40 | MF | (Brazil) Petros | (Spain) Real Betis | R$5,520,000 | 22 June 2015 | First team | |
| 15 | MF | (Brazil) Matheus Cassini | (Italy) Palermo | R$5,100,000 | 29 June 2015 | First team | |

==== Loans out ====
| # | Position | Player | Loaned to | Date | Loan expires | Team | Source |
|---|---|---|---|---|---|---|---|
| | MF | (Brazil) Giovanni | (Brazil) São Bento | 7 January 2015 | 30 April 2015 | Academy | |
| | DF | (Brazil) Antônio Carlos | (Brazil) Avaí | 8 January 2015 | 31 December 2015 | First team | |
| | MF | (Brazil) Willian Arão | (Brazil) Botafogo | 10 January 2015 | 31 December 2015 | First team | |
| | GK | (Brazil) Renan | (Brazil) Caxias | 16 January 2015 | 31 December 2015 (Returned on 24 October 2015) | First team | |
| | DF | (Brazil) Igor | (Brazil) Linense | 21 January 2015 | 30 April 2015 | First team | |
| 34 | DF | (Brazil) Pedro Henrique | (Brazil) Bragantino | 22 April 2015 | 31 December 2015 (Returned in August 2015) | First team | |
| | MF | (Brazil) Zé Paulo | (Brazil) Bragantino | 27 April 2015 | 31 December 2015 (Returned on 3 July 2015) | First team | |
| | FW | (Brazil) Gustavo Tocantins | (Brazil) Bragantino | 27 April 2015 | 31 December 2015 (Returned on 12 June 2015) | First team | |
| | FW | (Colombia) Brayan Riascos | (Brazil) Bragantino | 27 April 2015 | 31 December 2015 | Academy | |
| | MF | (Brazil) Giovanni | (Brazil) Atlético Paranaense | 6 May 2015 | 31 December 2015 | First team | |
| 15 | DF | (Brazil) Guilherme Arana | (Brazil) Atlético Paranaense | 7 May 2015 | 31 December 2015 (Returned on 26 June 2015) | First team | |
| | DF | (Brazil) Moisés | (Brazil) Bragantino | 15 May 2015 | 31 December 2015 | First team | |
| | DF | (Brazil) Denner | (Brazil) Red Bull Brasil | 2 July 2015 | 31 December 2015 | First team | |
| | MF | (Brazil) Zé Paulo | (Portugal) Rio Ave | 18 July 2015 | 30 June 2016 | First team | |
| | MF | (Brazil) Vitor Júnior | (Thailand) Siam Navy | 22 July 2015 | 31 December 2015 | First team | |
| | DF | (Brazil) Guilherme Andrade | (Brazil) Ceará | 5 August 2015 | 30 November 2015 | First team | |
| 30 | FW | (Colombia) Stiven Mendoza | (India) Chennaiyin | 31 August 2015 | 31 December 2015 | First team | |
| | GK | (Brazil) Renan | (Brazil) Tigres do Brasil | 9 November 2015 | 30 April 2016 | First team | |
| | DF | (Brazil) Igor | (Brazil) Tigres do Brasil | 9 November 2015 | 30 April 2016 | First team | |

== Squad statistics ==
| No. | Pos. | Name | Campeonato Paulista | | Copa Libertadores | | Campeonato Brasileiro | | Copa do Brasil | | Total | | Discipline | |
| No. | Pos. | Name | Apps | Goals | Apps | Goals | Apps | Goals | Apps | Goals | Apps | Goals | Yellow card | Red card |
|---|---|---|---|---|---|---|---|---|---|---|---|---|---|---|
| 1 | GK | (Brazil) Caíque França | 0 | 0 | 0 | 0 | 0 | 0 | 0 | 0 | 0 | 0 | 0 | 0 |
| 2 | DF | (Brazil) Edu Dracena | 9 (2) | 0 | 1 (3) | 0 | 15 (1) | 2 | 0 (1) | 0 | 25 (7) | 2 | 3 | 0 |
| 3 | DF | (Brazil) Yago | 8 | 1 | 0 | 0 | 4 (4) | 0 | 0 | 0 | 12 (4) | 1 | 2 | 0 |
| 4 | DF | (Brazil) Gil | 8 | 0 | 10 | 0 | 34 | 2 | 2 | 0 | 54 | 2 | 10 | 1 |
| 5 | MF | (Brazil) Ralf (c) | 10 (4) | 0 | 10 | 0 | 21 (10) | 1 | 1 | 0 | 42 (14) | 1 | 4 | 0 |
| 6 | DF | (Brazil) Fábio Santos | 4 | 2 | 4 | 0 | 6 | 1 | 0 | 0 | 14 | 3 | 2 | 2 |
| 6 | DF | (Brazil) Uendel | 8 | 0 | 6 | 0 | 19 | 2 | 2 | 0 | 35 | 2 | 2 | 0 |
| 7 | MF | (Brazil) Elias | 6 (1) | 0 | 10 | 4 | 23 (1) | 5 | 1 | 0 | 40 (2) | 9 | 8 | 0 |
| 8 | MF | (Brazil) Renato Augusto | 6 (1) | 2 | 10 | 0 | 30 | 5 | 2 | 0 | 48 (1) | 7 | 3 | 0 |
| 9 | FW | (Peru) Paolo Guerrero | 10 (1) | 6 | 5 | 4 | 2 | 0 | 0 | 0 | 17 (1) | 10 | 2 | 1 |
| 9 | FW | (Brazil) Lincom | 0 | 0 | 0 | 0 | 0 (3) | 0 | 0 | 0 | 0 (3) | 0 | 0 | 0 |
| 10 | MF | (Brazil) Jádson | 9 (3) | 1 | 10 | 2 | 34 | 13 | 1 | 0 | 54 (3) | 16 | 10 | 1 |
| 11 | FW | (Qatar) Emerson Sheik | 7 | 2 | 7 | 1 | 0 (3) | 0 | 0 | 0 | 14 (3) | 3 | 5 | 1 |
| 11 | FW | (Paraguay) Ángel Romero | 0 (4) | 0 | 0 | 0 | 6 (6) | 3 | 0 (1) | 1 | 6 (11) | 4 | 0 | 0 |
| 12 | GK | (Brazil) Cássio | 13 | 0 | 10 | 0 | 35 | 0 | 2 | 0 | 60 | 0 | 4 | 1 |
| 13 | DF | (Brazil) Guilherme Arana | 0 | 0 | 0 | 0 | 10 (2) | 1 | 0 | 0 | 10 (2) | 1 | 2 | 0 |
| 14 | MF | (Paraguay) Gustavo Viera | 0 | 0 | 0 | 0 | 0 | 0 | 0 | 0 | 0 | 0 | 0 | 0 |
| 15 | MF | (Brazil) Matheus Vargas | 0 | 0 | 0 | 0 | 0 | 0 | 0 | 0 | 0 | 0 | 0 | 0 |
| 16 | MF | (Brazil) Cristian | 9 (2) | 1 | 0 (1) | 0 | 5 (8) | 1 | 0 (1) | 0 | 14 (12) | 2 | 3 | 0 |
| 18 | FW | (Brazil) Luciano | 4 (5) | 1 | 1 (1) | 0 | 4 (2) | 5 | 1 | 0 | 10 (8) | 6 | 1 | 0 |
| 19 | MF | (Brazil) Matheus Pereira | 0 | 0 | 0 | 0 | 0 (1) | 0 | 1 | 0 | 1 (1) | 0 | 0 | 0 |
| 20 | MF | (Brazil) Danilo | 6 (5) | 3 | 3 (5) | 0 | 3 (26) | 0 | 0 (1) | 0 | 12 (37) | 3 | 3 | 0 |
| 21 | FW | (Brazil) Malcom | 6 (4) | 3 | 1 (2) | 0 | 29 (2) | 5 | 2 | 0 | 38 (8) | 8 | 2 | 0 |
| 22 | MF | (Brazil) Marciel | 0 | 0 | 0 | 0 | 3 (1) | 1 | 0 | 0 | 3 (1) | 1 | 0 | 0 |
| 23 | DF | (Brazil) Fagner | 9 (2) | 1 | 10 | 1 | 26 | 0 | 1 | 0 | 46 (2) | 2 | 13 | 1 |
| 25 | MF | (Brazil) Bruno Henrique | 6 (4) | 1 | 0 (5) | 0 | 19 (3) | 1 | 2 | 0 | 27 (12) | 2 | 6 | 0 |
| 26 | MF | (Brazil) Rodriguinho | 0 | 0 | 0 | 0 | 6 (6) | 2 | 0 | 0 | 6 (6) | 2 | 1 | 0 |
| 27 | GK | (Brazil) Walter | 4 (1) | 0 | 0 | 0 | 3 (1) | 0 | 0 | 0 | 7 (2) | 0 | 0 | 0 |
| 28 | DF | (Brazil) Felipe | 10 (1) | 1 | 9 | 2 | 26 | 1 | 2 | 0 | 47 (1) | 4 | 14 | 1 |
| 29 | DF | (Brazil) Rodrigo Sam | 1 | 0 | 0 | 0 | 0 | 0 | 0 | 0 | 1 | 0 | 1 | 0 |
| 30 | FW | (Colombia) Stiven Mendoza | 7 (1) | 2 | 1 (5) | 0 | 6 (4) | 1 | 0 (1) | 0 | 14 (11) | 3 | 1 | 1 |
| 30 | FW | (Brazil) Lucca | 0 | 0 | 0 | 0 | 2 (8) | 3 | 0 | 0 | 2 (8) | 3 | 2 | 0 |
| 31 | FW | (Brazil) Rildo | 0 | 0 | 0 | 0 | 2 (10) | 0 | 0 | 0 | 2 (10) | 0 | 0 | 0 |
| 32 | GK | (Brazil) Matheus Vidotto | 0 | 0 | 0 | 0 | 0 | 0 | 0 | 0 | 0 | 0 | 0 | 0 |
| 33 | DF | (Brazil) Edílson | 8 (1) | 0 | 0 (1) | 0 | 12 (6) | 0 | 1 | 0 | 21 (8) | 0 | 9 | 0 |
| 34 | DF | (Brazil) Pedro Henrique | 0 | 0 | 0 | 0 | 0 | 0 | 0 | 0 | 0 | 0 | 0 | 0 |
| 40 | MF | (Brazil) Petros | 10 (3) | 2 | 0 (3) | 0 | 4 (4) | 0 | 0 | 0 | 14 (10) | 2 | 2 | 0 |
| 99 | FW | (Brazil) Vágner Love | 8 (6) | 2 | 2 (1) | 0 | 28 (3) | 14 | 1 (1) | 0 | 39 (11) | 16 | 4 | 0 |

== Overview ==
| Competition | First match | Last match | Starting round | Final position | Record | | | | | | | |
| Competition | First match | Last match | Starting round | Final position | Pld | W | D | L | GF | GA | GD | Win % |
|---|---|---|---|---|---|---|---|---|---|---|---|---|
| Série A | 10 May 2015 | 6 December 2015 | Matchday 1 | Winners | 38 | 24 | 9 | 5 | 71 | 31 | +40 | 63.16 |
| Copa do Brasil | 19 August 2015 | 26 August 2015 | Round of 16 | Round of 16 | 2 | 0 | 0 | 2 | 1 | 4 | −3 | 0.00 |
| Campeonato Paulista | 1 February 2015 | 19 April 2015 | Matchday 1 | Semi-Finals | 17 | 12 | 5 | 0 | 31 | 12 | +19 | 70.59 |
| Copa Libertadores | 4 February 2015 | 13 May 2015 | First stage | Round of 16 | 10 | 5 | 2 | 3 | 14 | 7 | +7 | 50.00 |
| Total | | | | | 67 | 41 | 16 | 10 | 117 | 54 | +63 | 61.19 |

Source: Competitions

== Pre-season and friendlies ==
| 15 January 2015 Florida Cup | Corinthians (Brazil) | 0–1 | (Germany) 1. FC Köln | Orlando, Florida, United States |
| 19:30 UTC−05:00 | | Report | Peszko 13' | Stadium: ESPN Wide World of Sports Complex; Attendance: 3,500 |

| 17 January 2015 Florida Cup | Corinthians (Brazil) | 2–1 | (Germany) Bayer Leverkusen | Jacksonville, Florida, United States |
| 13:00 UTC−05:00 | Guerrero 28', 58' | Report | Yurchenko 13' | Stadium: EverBank Field; Attendance: 7,242 |

| 24 January 2015 Friendly | Corinthians (Brazil) | 3–0 | (England) Corinthian-Casuals | São Paulo, Brazil |
| 17:00 UTC−03:00 | Danilo 78'; Luciano 90', 90+5' | Report | | Stadium: Arena Corinthians; Attendance: 25,847; Referee: Ilbert Estevam da Silva |

| 22 July 2015 Friendly | ABC (Brazil) | 0–1 | (Brazil) Corinthians | Natal, Brazil |
| 19:30 UTC−03:00 | | Report | Rodriguinho 42' (pen.) | Stadium: Frasqueirão; Referee: Zandick Gondim Alves Júnior |

Last updated: 22 July 2015

== Campeonato Paulista ==
For the 2015 Campeonato Paulista, the 20 teams are divided in four groups of 5 teams (A, B, C, D). They will face all teams, except those that are in their own group, with the top two teams from each group qualifying for the quarter-finals, where they will face each other. The top teams from each group will host the match. The best campaign also guarantees the home advantage for the semi-final as well as hosting the second leg of the finals.

=== Statistics ===
Group B
| Pos | Team | Pld | W | D | L | GF | GA | GD | Pts | Qualification |
|---|---|---|---|---|---|---|---|---|---|---|
| 1 | Corinthians (A) | 15 | 11 | 4 | 0 | 28 | 10 | +18 | 37 | Advance to the quarter-finals |
| 2 | Ponte Preta (A) | 15 | 8 | 3 | 4 | 22 | 17 | +5 | 27 | Advance to the quarter-finals |
| 3 | Audax | 15 | 6 | 4 | 5 | 23 | 19 | +4 | 22 | |
| 4 | São Bento | 15 | 4 | 9 | 2 | 17 | 13 | +4 | 21 | |
| 5 | Rio Claro | 15 | 4 | 4 | 7 | 11 | 16 | −5 | 16 | |

(A) Advance to a further round

=== First stage ===
| 1 February 2015 1 | Corinthians | 3–0 | Marília | São Paulo |
| 17:00 UTC−03:00 | Renato Augusto 11'; Fagner 56'; Guerrero 59' | Report | | Stadium: Arena Corinthians; Attendance: 25,896; Referee: Douglas Marques das Flores |

| 8 February 2015 2 | Palmeiras | 0–1 | Corinthians | São Paulo |
| 17:00 UTC−03:00 | | Report | Danilo 32' | Stadium: Allianz Parque; Attendance: 28,869; Referee: Raphael Claus |

| 14 February 2015 3 | Corinthians | 2–1 | Botafogo | São Paulo |
| 17:00 UTC−03:00 | Fábio Santos 42' (pen.), 90+4' (pen.) | Report | Rodrigo 46' | Stadium: Arena Corinthians; Attendance: 27,296; Referee: Marcelo Prieto Alfieri |

| 22 February 2015 4 | Ituano | 1–1 | Corinthians | Itu |
| 16:00 UTC−03:00 | Jheimy 67' | Report | Cristian 60' (pen.) | Stadium: Estádio Novelli Júnior; Attendance: 11,271; Referee: Marcio Henrique de Gois |

| 25 February 2015 5 | Linense | 0–2 | Corinthians | Lins |
| 19:30 UTC−03:00 | | Report | Mendoza 13'; Petros 64' | Stadium: Estádio Gilberto Siqueira Lopes; Attendance: 8,135; Referee: Luiz Vanderlei Martinucho |

| 1 March 2015 6 | Corinthians | 3–0 | Mogi Mirim | São Paulo |
| 16:00 UTC−03:00 | Jádson 58'; Luciano 76'; Guerrero 88' | Report | | Stadium: Arena Corinthians; Attendance: 29,688; Referee: Guilherme Ceretta de Lima |

| 8 March 2015 7 | São Paulo | 0–1 | Corinthians | São Paulo |
| 16:00 UTC−03:00 | | Report | Danilo 11' | Stadium: Estádio do Morumbi; Attendance: 18,720; Referee: Leandro Bizzio Marinho |

| 11 March 2015 8 | Corinthians | 1–0 | São Bernardo | São Paulo |
| 22:00 UTC−03:00 | Malcom 31' | Report | | Stadium: Arena Corinthians; Attendance: 23,780; Referee: Leonardo Ferreira Lima |

| 14 March 2015 9 | Corinthians | 0–0 | Red Bull Brasil | São Paulo |
| 16:00 UTC−03:00 | | Report | | Stadium: Arena Corinthians; Attendance: 31,764; Referee: Luiz Vanderlei Martinucho |

| 22 March 2015 10 | Capivariano | 2–3 | Corinthians | Capivari |
| 16:00 UTC−03:00 | Kleiton Domingues 57'; Fernando Lombardi 83' | Report | Emerson 42'; Guerrero 44', 65' | Stadium: Arena Capivari; Referee: Guilherme Ceretta de Lima |

| 24 March 2015 11 | Corinthians | 2–0 | Portuguesa | São Paulo |
| 19:30 UTC−03:00 | Malcom 27', 63' | Report | | Stadium: Arena Corinthians; Attendance: 25,269; Referee: Luiz Flávio de Oliveira |

| 26 March 2015 12 | Corinthians | 5–3 | Penapolense | São Paulo |
| 19:30 UTC−03:00 | Guerrero 9', 52'; Yago 11'; Emerson 26'; Petros 30' | Report | Crislan 74', 78'; Luís Gustavo 89' | Stadium: Arena Corinthians; Attendance: 27,175; Referee: Adriano de Assis Miranda |

| 29 March 2015 13 | Bragantino | 0–1 | Corinthians | Bragança Paulista |
| 16:00 UTC−03:00 | | Report | Vágner Love 10' | Stadium: Estádio Nabi Abi Chedid; Attendance: 6,612; Referee: Thiago Duarte Peixoto |

| 5 April 2015 14 | Corinthians | 1–1 | Santos | São Paulo |
| 16:00 UTC−03:00 | Felipe 41' | Report | Ricardo Oliveira 58' | Stadium: Arena Corinthians; Attendance: 32,566; Referee: Vinicius Gonçalves Dias Araújo |

| 8 April 2015 15 | XV de Piracicaba | 2–2 | Corinthians | Piracicaba |
| 22:00 UTC−03:00 | Roni 25'; Paulinho 81' | Report | Bruno Henrique 30'; Vágner Love 34' | Stadium: Estádio Barão da Serra Negra; Attendance: 14,153; Referee: Leonardo Ferreira Lima |

=== Knockout stages ===
| 11 April 2015 Quarter-finals | Corinthians | 1–0 | Ponte Preta | São Paulo |
| 16:20 UTC−03:00 | Renato Augusto 55' | Report | | Stadium: Arena Corinthians; Attendance: 32,869; Referee: Flávio Rodrigues de Souza |

| 19 April 2015 Semi-finals | Corinthians | 2–2 (5–6 p) | Palmeiras | São Paulo |
| 16:00 UTC−03:00 | Danilo 33'; Mendoza 44' | Report | Victor Ramos 13'; Rafael Marques 74' | Stadium: Arena Corinthians; Attendance: 39,055; Referee: Thiago Duarte Peixoto |
| | Penalties |
| | Fábio Santos (penalty scored); Renato Augusto (penalty scored); Fagner (penalty scored); Ralf (penalty scored); Elias (penalty missed); Gil (penalty scored); Petros (penalty missed) | | (penalty missed) Robinho; (penalty scored) Rafael Marques; (penalty scored) Victor Ramos; (penalty scored) Cleiton Xavier; (penalty scored) Dudu; (penalty scored) Kelvin; (penalty scored) Jackson |

== Copa Libertadores ==
=== First stage ===
| 4 February 2015 First stage | Corinthians (Brazil) | 4–0 | (Colombia) Once Caldas | São Paulo, Brazil |
| 22:00 UTC−2 | Emerson 1'; Felipe 54'; Elias 69'; Fagner 78' | Report | | Stadium: Arena Corinthians; Attendance: 36,236; Referee: Patricio Loustau (Argentina) |

| 11 February 2015 First stage | Once Caldas (Colombia) | 1–1 | (Brazil) Corinthians | Manizales, Colombia |
| 19:00 UTC−5 | Arango 57' | Report | Elias 14' | Stadium: Estadio Palogrande; Referee: Darío Ubriaco (Uruguay) |

Corinthians advanced to second stage (Group 2).

=== Second stage ===
| Pos | Team | Pld | W | D | L | GF | GA | GD | Pts | Qualification |
|---|---|---|---|---|---|---|---|---|---|---|
| 1 | (Brazil) Corinthians | 6 | 4 | 1 | 1 | 9 | 3 | +6 | 13 | Advance to final stages |
| 2 | (Brazil) São Paulo | 6 | 4 | 0 | 2 | 9 | 4 | +5 | 12 | Advance to final stages |
| 3 | (Argentina) San Lorenzo | 6 | 2 | 1 | 3 | 3 | 4 | −1 | 7 | |
| 4 | (Uruguay) Danubio | 6 | 1 | 0 | 5 | 4 | 14 | −10 | 3 | |

Source: CONMEBOL
Rules for classification: Second stage tiebreakers

| 18 February 2015 1 | Corinthians (Brazil) | 2–0 | (Brazil) São Paulo | São Paulo, Brazil |
| 22:00 UTC−2 | Elias 11'; Jádson 67' | Report | | Stadium: Arena Corinthians; Attendance: 39,026; Referee: Ricardo Marques Ribeiro (Brazil) |

| 4 March 2015 2 | San Lorenzo (Argentina) | 0–1 | (Brazil) Corinthians | Buenos Aires, Argentina |
| 22:00 UTC−3 | | Report | Elias 65' | Stadium: Estadio Pedro Bidegain; Attendance: 0 (Note: San Lorenzo played their home match against Corinthians behind closed doors as they were punished for previous crowd disturbances at the 2014 Copa Libertadores Finals.); Referee: Carlos Vera (Ecuador) |

| 17 March 2015 3 | Danubio (Uruguay) | 1–2 | (Brazil) Corinthians | Montevideo, Uruguay |
| 19:30 UTC−3 | Barreto 90+3' | Report | Guerrero 69'; Felipe 79' | Stadium: Estadio Luis Franzini; Referee: Julio Bascuñán (Chile) |

| 1 April 2015 4 | Corinthians (Brazil) | 4–0 | (Uruguay) Danubio | São Paulo, Brazil |
| 22:00 UTC−3 | Jádson 26'; Guerrero 32', 46', 67' | Report | | Stadium: Arena Corinthians; Attendance: 38,928; Referee: Diego Haro (Peru) |

| 16 April 2015 5 | Corinthians (Brazil) | 0–0 | (Argentina) San Lorenzo | São Paulo, Brazil |
| 22:00 UTC−3 | | Report | | Stadium: Arena Corinthians; Attendance: 41,107; Referee: Víctor Carrillo (Peru) |

| 22 April 2015 6 | São Paulo (Brazil) | 2–0 | (Brazil) Corinthians | São Paulo, Brazil |
| 22:00 UTC−3 | Luís Fabiano 31'; Michel Bastos 39' | Report | | Stadium: Estádio do Morumbi; Attendance: 38,782; Referee: Sandro Ricci (Brazil) |

=== Knockout stages ===
| 6 May 2015 Round of 16 | Guaraní (Paraguay) | 2–0 | (Brazil) Corinthians | Asunción, Paraguay |
| 18:45 UTC−4 | Santander 60'; Contrera 81' | Report | | Stadium: Estadio Defensores del Chaco; Attendance: 8,725; Referee: Daniel Fedorczuk (Uruguay) |

| 13 May 2015 Round of 16 | Corinthians (Brazil) | 0–1 | (Paraguay) Guaraní | São Paulo, Brazil |
| 22:00 UTC−3 | | Report | Fernández 90+1' | Stadium: Arena Corinthians; Attendance: 40,239; Referee: Enrique Osses (Chile) |

Guaraní advanced to the quarterfinals.

== Campeonato Brasileiro ==
| Pos | Team | Pld | W | D | L | GF | GA | GD | Pts | Qualification or relegation |
|---|---|---|---|---|---|---|---|---|---|---|
| 1 | Corinthians (C) | 38 | 24 | 9 | 5 | 71 | 31 | +40 | 81 | 2016 Copa Libertadores second stage (Note: Palmeiras has a berth guaranteed to the second stage as the 2015 Copa do Brasil champions.) |
| 2 | Atlético Mineiro | 38 | 21 | 6 | 11 | 65 | 47 | +18 | 69 | 2016 Copa Libertadores second stage |
| 3 | Grêmio | 38 | 20 | 8 | 10 | 52 | 32 | +20 | 68 | 2016 Copa Libertadores second stage |
| 4 | São Paulo | 38 | 18 | 8 | 12 | 53 | 47 | +6 | 62 | 2016 Copa Libertadores first stage |
| 5 | Internacional | 38 | 17 | 9 | 12 | 39 | 38 | +1 | 60 | 2016 Copa do Brasil round of 16 (Note: Since a Brazilian team didn't win the 2015 Copa Libertadores, an additional berth to the 2016 Copa do Brasil round of 16 will be given to the best team not qualified to the 2016 Copa Libertadores, the fifth-placed Internacional.) |

Source: Soccerway.com
Rules for classification: 1) points; 2) wins; 3) goal difference; 4) goals scored; 5) head-to-head results; 6) least red cards received; 7) least yellow cards received; 8) draw.
(C) Champions

=== Results ===
| 10 May 2015 1 | Cruzeiro | 0–1 | Corinthians | Cuiabá |
| 15:00 UTC−04:00 | | Report | Romero 82' | Stadium: Arena Pantanal (Note: Cruzeiro played their home match against Corinthians at a neutral venue due to a suspension imposed by the STJD regarding crowd disturbances in their home match against Atlético Mineiro at the 2014 Campeonato Brasileiro Série A); Attendance: 11,773; Referee: Anderson Daronco |

| 16 May 2015 2 | Corinthians | 1–0 | Chapecoense | Araraquara |
| 21:00 UTC−03:00 | Fábio Santos 27' | Report | | Stadium: Estádio Fonte Luminosa (Note: Corinthians played their home match against Chapecoense at a neutral venue due to a suspension imposed by the STJD regarding crowd disturbances in their home match against Grêmio at the 2014 Campeonato Brasileiro Série A); Attendance: 10,144; Referee: Marcelo de Lima Henrique |

| 24 May 2015 3 | Fluminense | 0–0 | Corinthians | Rio de Janeiro |
| 16:00 UTC−03:00 | | Report | | Stadium: Estádio Jornalista Mário Filho (Maracanã); Attendance: 17,419; Referee: Héber Roberto Lopes |

| 31 May 2015 4 | Corinthians | 0–2 | Palmeiras | São Paulo |
| 16:00 UTC−03:00 | | Report | Rafael Marques 24'; Zé Roberto 45+1' | Stadium: Arena Corinthians; Attendance: 29,479; Referee: Vinícius Gonçalves Dias Araújo |

| 3 June 2015 5 | Grêmio | 3–1 | Corinthians | Porto Alegre |
| 22:00 UTC−03:00 | Giuliano 2'; Marcelo Oliveira 4'; Luan 38' | Report | Mendoza 22' | Stadium: Arena do Grêmio; Attendance: 20,231; Referee: Wilton Pereira Sampaio |

| 6 June 2015 6 | Joinville | 0–1 | Corinthians | Joinville |
| 22:00 UTC−03:00 | | Report | Jádson 31' | Stadium: Arena Joinville; Attendance: 14,131; Referee: Dewson Fernando Freitas da Silva |

| 13 June 2015 7 | Corinthians | 2–1 | Internacional | São Paulo |
| 16:30 UTC−03:00 | Jádson 50'; Vágner Love 66' | Report | Nilmar 40' | Stadium: Arena Corinthians; Attendance: 27,270; Referee: Marcelo de Lima Henrique |

| 20 June 2015 8 | Santos | 1–0 | Corinthians | Santos |
| 16:30 UTC−03:00 | Ricardo Oliveira 9' | Report | | Stadium: Estádio Urbano Caldeira (Vila Belmiro); Attendance: 7,674; Referee: Luiz Flávio de Oliveira |

| 27 June 2015 9 | Corinthians | 2–1 | Figueirense | São Paulo |
| 21:00 UTC−03:00 | Vágner Love 54'; Jádson 64' (pen.) | Report | Thiago Santana 73' | Stadium: Arena Corinthians; Attendance: 25,063; Referee: Igor Júnio Benevenuto |

| 2 July 2015 10 | Corinthians | 2–0 | Ponte Preta | São Paulo |
| 19:30 UTC−03:00 | Jádson 40'; Vágner Love 90+5' | Report | | Stadium: Arena Corinthians; Attendance: 26,951; Referee: Thiago Duarte Peixoto |

| 5 July 2015 11 | Goiás | 0–0 | Corinthians | Goiânia |
| 16:00 UTC−03:00 | | Report | | Stadium: Estádio Serra Dourada; Attendance: 9,438; Referee: Héber Roberto Lopes |

| 9 July 2015 12 | Corinthians | 2–0 | Atlético Paranaense | São Paulo |
| 19:30 UTC−03:00 | Elias 33'; Jádson 76' | Report | | Stadium: Arena Corinthians; Attendance: 32,737; Referee: Ricardo Marques Ribeiro |

| 12 July 2015 13 | Flamengo | 0–3 | Corinthians | Rio de Janeiro |
| 16:00 UTC−03:00 | | Report | Elias 25'; Uendel 45+3'; Jádson 62' | Stadium: Estádio Jornalista Mário Filho (Maracanã); Attendance: 29,872; Referee: Leandro Vuaden |

| 18 July 2015 14 | Corinthians | 1–0 | Atlético Mineiro | São Paulo |
| 21:00 UTC−03:00 | Malcom 41' | Report | | Stadium: Arena Corinthians; Attendance: 36,577; Referee: Anderson Daronco |

| 26 July 2015 15 | Coritiba | 1–1 | Corinthians | Curitiba |
| 16:00 UTC−03:00 | Evandro 90+1' | Report | Felipe 40' | Stadium: Estádio Couto Pereira; Attendance: 20,467; Referee: Pablo dos Santos Alves |

| 29 July 2015 16 | Corinthians | 3–0 | Vasco da Gama | São Paulo |
| 21:00 UTC−03:00 | Renato Augusto 46'; Gil 60'; Elias 76' | Report | | Stadium: Arena Corinthians; Attendance: 30,340; Referee: Leandro Vuaden |

| 9 August 2015 17 | São Paulo | 1–1 | Corinthians | São Paulo |
| 16:00 UTC−03:00 | Luís Fabiano 47' | Report | Luciano 21' | Stadium: Estádio do Morumbi; Attendance: 31,384; Referee: Leandro Vuaden |

| 12 August 2015 18 | Corinthians | 4–3 | Sport Recife | São Paulo |
| 21:00 UTC−03:00 | Luciano 12', 45+1'; Samuel Xavier 59' (o.g.); Jádson 86' (pen.) | Report | André 16'; Hernane 71', 76' | Stadium: Arena Corinthians; Attendance: 31,283; Referee: Luiz Flávio de Oliveira |

| 16 August 2015 19 | Avaí | 1–2 | Corinthians | Florianópolis |
| 16:00 UTC−03:00 | André Lima 14' | Report | Luciano 45+2', 86' | Stadium: Estádio da Ressacada; Attendance: 11,389; Referee: Anderson Daronco |

| 23 August 2015 20 | Corinthians | 3–0 | Cruzeiro | São Paulo |
| 16:00 UTC−03:00 | Vágner Love 14', 47'; Jádson 44' | Report | | Stadium: Arena Corinthians; Attendance: 41,380; Referee: Péricles Bassols |

| 30 August 2015 21 | Chapecoense | 1–3 | Corinthians | Chapecó |
| 16:00 UTC−03:00 | Bruno Rangel 45+2' | Report | Elias 9'; Vágner Love 13'; Jádson 89' (pen.) | Stadium: Arena Condá; Attendance: 13,322; Referee: Wilton Pereira Sampaio |

| 2 September 2015 22 | Corinthians | 2–0 | Fluminense | São Paulo |
| 22:00 UTC−03:00 | Marciel 4'; Ralf 70' | Report | | Stadium: Arena Corinthians; Attendance: 29,777; Referee: Sandro Ricci |

| 6 September 2015 23 | Palmeiras | 3–3 | Corinthians | São Paulo |
| 16:00 UTC−03:00 | Lucas 18'; Robinho 26'; Dudu 41' | Report | Arana 24'; Amaral 37' (o.g.); Vágner Love 78' | Stadium: Allianz Parque; Attendance: 35,707; Referee: Raphael Claus |

| 9 September 2015 24 | Corinthians | 1–1 | Grêmio | São Paulo |
| 22:00 UTC−03:00 | Renato Augusto 65' | Report | Bobô 58' | Stadium: Arena Corinthians; Attendance: 30,470; Referee: André Luiz de Freitas Castro |

| 13 September 2015 25 | Corinthians | 3–0 | Joinville | São Paulo |
| 11:00 UTC−03:00 | Malcom 38'; Uendel 57'; Vágner Love 88' | Report | | Stadium: Arena Corinthians; Attendance: 42,075; Referee: Wilton Pereira Sampaio |

| 16 September 2015 26 | Internacional | 2–1 | Corinthians | Porto Alegre |
| 22:00 UTC−03:00 | Réver 27'; Valdívia 73' | Report | Malcom 18' | Stadium: Estádio Beira-Rio; Attendance: 19,083; Referee: Jaílson Macedo Freitas |

| 20 September 2015 27 | Corinthians | 2–0 | Santos | São Paulo |
| 11:00 UTC−03:00 | Jádson 85' (pen.), 88' | Report | | Stadium: Arena Corinthians; Attendance: 42,058; Referee: Flávio Rodrigues Guerra |

| 27 September 2015 28 | Figueirense | 1–3 | Corinthians | Florianópolis |
| 16:00 UTC−03:00 | Leandro Silva 90' | Report | Elias 14'; Gil 66'; Renato Augusto 82' | Stadium: Estádio Orlando Scarpelli; Attendance: 9,967; Referee: Marcelo de Lima Henrique |

| 4 October 2015 29 | Ponte Preta | 2–2 | Corinthians | Campinas |
| 16:00 UTC−03:00 | Elton 61'; Felipe Azevedo 63' | Report | Jádson 42'; Rodriguinho 84' | Stadium: Estádio Moisés Lucarelli; Attendance: 10,211; Referee: Flávio Rodrigues de Souza |

| 15 October 2015 30 | Corinthians | 3–0 | Goiás | São Paulo |
| 19:30 UTC−03:00 | Edu Dracena 15'; Malcom 26'; Rodriguinho 87' | Report | | Stadium: Arena Corinthians; Attendance: 41,179; Referee: Wagner Reway |

| 18 October 2015 31 | Atlético Paranaense | 1–4 | Corinthians | Curitiba |
| 16:00 UTC−03:00 | Bruno Mota 55' | Report | Renato Augusto 16', 45'; Vágner Love 28', 61' | Stadium: Arena da Baixada; Attendance: 26,051; Referee: Elmo Alves Resende da Cunha |

| 25 October 2015 32 | Corinthians | 1–0 | Flamengo | São Paulo |
| 17:00 UTC−03:00 | Vágner Love 45+2' | Report | | Stadium: Arena Corinthians; Attendance: 43,942; Referee: Wilton Pereira Sampaio |

| 1 November 2015 33 | Atlético Mineiro | 0–3 | Corinthians | Belo Horizonte |
| 17:00 UTC−03:00 | | Report | Malcom 67'; Vágner Love 74'; Lucca 84' | Stadium: Estádio Independência; Attendance: 21,798; Referee: Héber Roberto Lopes |

| 7 November 2015 34 | Corinthians | 2–1 | Coritiba | São Paulo |
| 19:30 UTC−03:00 | Jádson 15' (pen.); Lucca 87' | Report | Negueba 46' | Stadium: Arena Corinthians; Attendance: 44,015; Referee: Dewson Fernando Freitas da Silva |

| 19 November 2015 35 | Vasco da Gama | 1–1 | Corinthians | Rio de Janeiro |
| 22:00 UTC−03:00 | Júlio César 71' | Report | Vágner Love 81' | Stadium: Estádio São Januário; Attendance: 17,325; Referee: Anderson Daronco |

| 22 November 2015 36 | Corinthians | 6–1 | São Paulo | São Paulo |
| 17:00 UTC−03:00 | Bruno Henrique 26'; Romero 28', 63'; Edu Dracena 45'; Lucca 60'; Cristian 75' (pen.) | Report | Carlinhos 69' | Stadium: Arena Corinthians; Attendance: 45,469; Referee: Péricles Bassols |

| 29 November 2015 37 | Sport Recife | 2–0 | Corinthians | São Lourenço da Mata |
| 17:00 UTC−03:00 | Matheus Ferraz 23'; André 90' | Report | | Stadium: Itaipava Arena Pernambuco; Attendance: 19,048; Referee: Ricardo Marques Ribeiro |

| 6 December 2015 38 | Corinthians | 1–1 | Avaí | São Paulo |
| 17:00 UTC−03:00 | Vágner Love 77' | Report | Claudinei 56' | Stadium: Arena Corinthians; Attendance: 43,652; Referee: Leandro Vuaden |

== Copa do Brasil ==
Due to being qualified to the 2015 Copa Libertadores, Corinthians entered the competition on the Round of 16.

=== Knockout stages ===
| 19 August 2015 Round of 16 | Santos | 2–0 | Corinthians | Santos |
| 22:00 UTC−03:00 | Gabriel 31'; Marquinhos Gabriel 78' | Report | | Stadium: Estádio Urbano Caldeira (Vila Belmiro); Attendance: 10,383; Referee: Wilton Pereira Sampaio |

| 26 August 2015 Round of 16 | Corinthians | 1–2 | Santos | São Paulo |
| 22:00 UTC−03:00 | Romero 72' | Report | Gabriel 14'; Ricardo Oliveira 64' | Stadium: Arena Corinthians; Attendance: 37,831; Referee: Ricardo Marques Ribeiro |

Santos advanced to the quarterfinals.

== See also ==
- List of Sport Club Corinthians Paulista seasons
