= Lucca (footballer, born 1990) =

Brazilian footballer

Personal information
- Full name: Lucca Borges de Brito
- Date of birth: 14 February 1990 (age 36)
- Place of birth: Alto Parnaíba, Brazil
- Height: 1.78 m (5 ft 10 in)
- Positions: Forward; winger

Team information
- Current team: Guarani
- Number: 9

Youth career
- 1998–2007: Palmas

Senior career*
Years	Team	Apps	(Gls)
2007–2009	Palmas	?	(18)
2009	Ituiutaba	0	(0)
2009–2016	Criciúma	123	(41)
2010–2011	→ Chapecoense (loan)	5	(1)
2013–2014	→ Cruzeiro (loan)	9	(0)
2015–2016	→ Corinthians (loan)	24	(7)
2016–2020	Corinthians	29	(8)
2017	→ Ponte Preta (loan)	55	(20)
2018	→ Internacional (loan)	15	(1)
2018–2019	→ Al-Rayyan (loan)	15	(7)
2019	→ Bahia (loan)	17	(0)
2020	→ Al-Khor (loan)	11	(5)
2020	Al-Khor	1	(0)
2020–2022	Fluminense	48	(6)
2022	Ponte Preta	38	(21)
2023–2024	Lamphun Warriors	14	(4)
2024–2025	Novorizontino	49	(7)
2026–	Guarani	22	(2)
- * Club domestic league appearances and goals as of 10 November 2026

Lucca Borges de Brito (born 14 February 1990), simply known as Lucca, is a Brazilian professional footballer who plays as a forward or a winger for Guarani.

== Club career ==
On 15 September 2015, he was loaned to Corinthians until the end of May 2016. He was signed definitively on 10 May 2016 for an undisclosed fee (rumored to be around R$4,5 million).

== Career statistics ==
As of 5 November 2021.

Club	Season	League			State League		Cup		Continental		Other		Total	
Club	Season	Division	Apps	Goals	Apps	Goals	Apps	Goals	Apps	Goals	Apps	Goals	Apps	Goals
Criciúma	2010	Série C	3	0	0	0	0	0	—		—		3	0
Criciúma	2011	Série B	2	0	9	2	0	0	—		—		11	2
Criciúma	2012	Série B	26	11	14	8	3	0	—		—		43	19
Criciúma	2014	Série A	26	13	13	2	2	0	2 (Note: Appearance(s) in Copa Sudamericana)	1	—		43	15
Criciúma	2015	Série B	20	4	10	1	3	3	—		—		33	7
Criciúma	Subtotal		77	28	46	13	8	3	2	1	0	0	133	45
Chapecoense (loan)	2011	Série C	5	1	—		—		—		—		5	1
Cruzeiro (loan)	2013	Série A	9	0	0	0	2	2	—		—		11	2
Corinthians (loan)	2015	Série A	10	3	—		—		—		—		10	3
Corinthians (loan)	2016	Série A	21	3	14	4	1	0	7 (Note: Appearance(s) in Copa Libertadores)	2	—		43	9
Corinthians (loan)	2018	Série A	0	0	8	0	0	0	1	0	—		9	0
Corinthians (loan)	Subtotal		31	6	22	4	1	0	8	2	0	0	62	11
Ponte Preta (loan)	2017	Série A	37	13	18	7	2	1	4	3	—		61	24
Internacional (loan)	2018	Série A	15	1	—		—		—		—		15	1
Al-Rayyan (loan)	2018–19	Qatar Stars League	15	7	—		5	5	7 (Note: Appearance(s) in AFC Champions League)	1	—		27	13
Bahia (loan)	2019	Série A	17	0	—		—		—		—		17	0
Al-Khor (loan)	2019–20	Qatar Stars League	11	5	—		1	0	—		1 (Note: Appearance(s) in Relegation play-off)	0	13	5
Al-Khor	2020–21	Qatar Stars League	1	0	—		0	0	—		—		1	0
Fluminense	2020	Série A	18	3	—		—		—		—		18	3
Fluminense	2021	Série A	17	3	8	0	2	0	4	0	—		31	3
Fluminense	Subtotal		35	6	8	0	2	0	4	0	—		49	6
Subtotal			253	67	94	24	19	9	25	7	1	0	383	107

== Honours ==
Palmas

- Campeonato Tocantinense: 2007

Cruzeiro

- Campeonato Brasileiro Série A: 2013

Corinthians

- Campeonato Brasileiro Série A: 2015
- Campeonato Paulista: 2018
