= Yago (footballer, born 1992) =

Brazilian footballer

Personal information
- Full name: Yago Fernando da Silva
- Date of birth: 29 August 1992 (age 34)
- Place of birth: São Paulo, Brazil
- Height: 1.85 m (6 ft 1 in)
- Position: Centre back

Youth career
- 2006–2011: Portuguesa
- 2011–2013: Corinthians

Senior career*
Years	Team	Apps	(Gls)
2012–2021	Corinthians	54	(2)
2012	→ Marília (loan)	4	(0)
2013–2014	→ Bragantino (loan)	50	(3)
2017	→ Ponte Preta (loan)	26	(1)
2018	→ Botafogo (loan)	5	(0)
2019	→ Goiás (loan)	38	(2)
2021	Náutico	17	(1)
- * Club domestic league appearances and goals as of 28 October 2021

Yago Fernando da Silva, known as Yago (born 29 August 1992), is a Brazilian professional footballer who plays as a centre back.

== Career ==
=== Youth and loans ===
Yago was part of Portuguesa's youth squad before moving over to Corinthians. He was loaned to Marília in 2012 and made his professional debut with the team. He returned to Corinthians in 2013 and was part of the squad that won the 2013 Campeonato Paulista. He was eventually loaned again, this time to Bragantino, where he played in the Brasileirão Série B of the same year, as well as the 2014 Campeonato Paulista, 2014 Brasileirão Série B and 2014 Copa do Brasil.

=== Corinthians ===
Yago returned to Corinthians in January, 2015, and was part of the main squad for the 2015 Campeonato Paulista and 2015 Copa Libertadores. He played a total of 8 games during the Campeonato Paulista, all of them as a part of the starting team as Corinthians mixed its players during the competition. He scored his first goal against Penapolense on 26 March in a 5–3 victory at Arena Corinthians.

== Career statistics ==
As of 11 April 2017.

Club	Season	League			State League		Cup		Continental		Other		Total	
Club	Season	Division	Apps	Goals	Apps	Goals	Apps	Goals	Apps	Goals	Apps	Goals	Apps	Goals
Marília	2012	Paulista A3	—		4	0	—		—		—		4	0
Corinthians	2013	Série A	0	0	1	0	0	0	0	0	—		1	0
Corinthians	2015	Série A	8	0	8	1	0	0	0	0	—		16	1
Corinthians	2016	Série A	15	0	12	1	3	0	7 (Note: Appearance(s) in Copa Libertadores)	0	—		37	1
Corinthians	Total		23	0	21	2	3	0	7	0	0	0	54	2
Bragantino	2013	Série B	10	0	—		0	0	—		—		10	0
Bragantino	2014	Série B	22	2	14	1	4	0	—		—		40	3
Bragantino	Total		32	2	14	1	4	0	0	0	0	0	50	3
Ponte Preta	2017	Série A	—		12	1	1	0	1	0	—		14	1
Career total			55	2	51	4	8	0	8	0	0	0	122	6

== Honours ==
Corinthians

- Campeonato Paulista: 2013
- Campeonato Brasileiro Série A: 2015

Botafogo

- Campeonato Carioca: 2018

Náutico

- Campeonato Pernambucano: 2021
