= Bruno Henrique (footballer, born 1989) =

Brazilian footballer

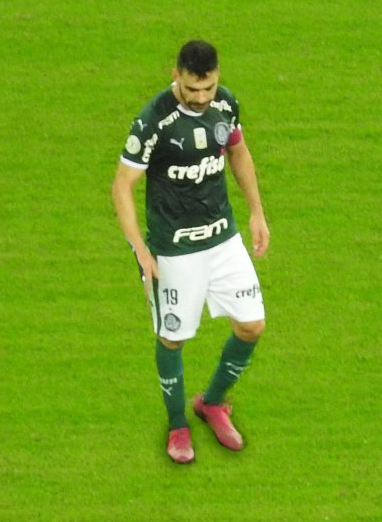
- Bruno Henrique playing for Palmeiras in 2019

Personal information
- Full name: Bruno Henrique Corsini
- Date of birth: 21 October 1989 (age 37)
- Place of birth: Apucarana, Brazil
- Height: 1.80 m (5 ft 11 in)
- Position: Central midfielder

Team information
- Current team: Internacional
- Number: 8

Youth career
- 2000–2001: Paraná
- 2003: Atlético Paranaense
- –2009: Iraty

Senior career*
Years	Team	Apps	(Gls)
2009–2011	Iraty	46	(9)
2010	→ Atlético Mineiro (loan)	0	(0)
2011	→ Londrina (loan)	21	(4)
2012–2013	Londrina	45	(4)
2013	→ Portuguesa (loan)	29	(4)
2014–2016	Corinthians	98	(7)
2016–2017	Palermo	33	(1)
2017–2020	Palmeiras	134	(23)
2020–2023	Al-Ittihad	72	(4)
2023–	Internacional	122	(10)
- * Club domestic league appearances and goals as of 8 April 2026

Bruno Henrique Corsini, simply known as Bruno Henrique (born 21 October 1989), is a Brazilian professional footballer who plays as a central midfielder for Internacional.

== Career ==
=== Iraty ===
Born in Apucarana, Paraná, Bruno Henrique started his career with Iraty, being promoted to the senior squad for the 2009 season. He made his first team debut on 15 February 2009, coming on as a substitute in a 1–0 Campeonato Paranaense home win over Paraná.

A backup option in his first season, Bruno Henrique became a regular starter for the club in 2010, and scored his first senior goal on 18 July of that year, netting Iraty's winner in a 2–1 Série D home success over Pelotas. In September 2010, he moved on loan to Atlético Mineiro, but only featured for the under-23 team before returning to his parent club.

On 30 January 2011, Bruno Henrique scored a brace in Iraty's 3–0 away win over Cascavel CR, and finished the year's Paranaense with seven goals.

=== Londrina ===
In 2011, Bruno Henrique signed with Londrina on loan, being a part of the club's Campeonato Paranaense Série Prata winning campaign as a starter. He signed a permanent deal for the 2012 campaign, and remained a first-choice for the side in the following years, impressing during the 2013 Campeonato Paranaense.

==== Loan to Portuguesa ====
On 12 July 2013, Bruno Henrique signed a six-month deal with Série A side Portuguesa. He top tier debut nine days later, starting in a 2–1 away loss against Goiás.

Bruno Henrique scored his first top flight goal on 1 August 2013, netting the opener in a 1–1 home draw against Criciúma. An immediate first-choice at Lusa, he was linked to São Paulo and Corinthians due to his performances.

=== Corinthians ===
On 9 January 2014, Londrina announced the transfer of Bruno Henrique to Corinthians, as the club agreed to pay R$ 1.5 million for 50% of his economic rights, with Londrina retaining 40% and the player keeping the remaining 10%. He was only presented by his new club on 11 February, and made his debut for Timão five days later, starting in a 1–1 home draw against rivals Palmeiras in the Campeonato Paulista.

Bruno Henrique scored his first goal for Corinthians on 1 November 2014, netting a last-minute equalizer in a 2–2 home draw against Coritiba. On 25 July of the following year, after establishing himself as a starter under Tite, he received a pay rise.

On 19 June 2016, Bruno Henrique scored a brace in a 3–1 home win over Botafogo.

=== Palermo ===
On 29 August 2016, Bruno Henrique moved abroad and signed a four-year contract with Palermo in the Italian Serie A, for a rumoured fee of € 3.3 million. He made his debut abroad on 10 September, replacing Mato Jajalo in a 3–0 home loss against Napoli.

Bruno Henrique scored his first goal for Palermo on 28 May 2017, netting his team's second in a 2–1 home win over Empoli, as his side were already relegated.

=== Palmeiras ===
On 15 June 2017, Bruno Henrique returned to his home country and signed a contract with Palmeiras until 2020. He made his debut for the club on 1 July, starting in a 1–0 home win over Grêmio.

Bruno Henrique scored his first goal for Verdão on 23 July 2017, netting the opener in a 2–0 away success over Sport Recife. On 1 February 2019, he renewed his link with the club until the end of 2023.

=== Al-Ittihad ===
In October 2020, Bruno Henrique was sold to Saudi club Al-Ittihad.

== Career statistics ==
As of 10 December 2023

Club	Season	League			State League		National Cup		Continental		Other		Total	
Club	Season	Division	Apps	Goals	Apps	Goals	Apps	Goals	Apps	Goals	Apps	Goals	Apps	Goals
Iraty	2009	Paranaense	—		2 (Note: Appearances in Campeonato Paranaense)	0	—		—		—		2	0
Iraty	2010	Série D	7	2	17	0	—		—		—		24	2
Iraty	2011	Paranaense	—		20	7	2	0	—		—		22	7
Iraty	Total		7	2	39	7	2	0	—		—		48	9
Londrina	2011	Paranaense Série Prata	—		21 (Note: Appearances in Campeonato Paranaense Série Prata)	4	—		—		—		21	4
Londrina	2012	Paranaense	—		21	2	—		—		—		21	2
Londrina	2013	Série D	1	0	23	2	—		—		—		24	2
Londrina	Total		1	0	65	8	0	0	—		—		66	8
Portuguesa	2013	Série A	29	4	—		—		—		—		29	4
Corinthians	2014	Série A	25	1	8 (Note: Appearances in Campeonato Paulista)	0	5	0	—		—		38	1
Corinthians	2015	Série A	22	1	10	1	2	0	5 (Note: Appearances in Copa Libertadores)	0	—		39	2
Corinthians	2016	Série A	21	4	12	0	0	0	7	0	—		40	4
Corinthians	Total		68	6	30	1	7	0	12	0	—		117	7
Palermo	2016–17	Serie A	33	1	—		0	0	—		—		33	1
Palmeiras	2017	Série A	15	2	—		—		2	0	—		17	2
Palmeiras	2018	Série A	33	9	14	2	6	0	10	3	—		63	14
Palmeiras	2019	Série A	34	10	14	0	0	0	5	0	—		53	10
Palmeiras	2020	Série A	13	0	12	0	0	0	5	0	—		30	0
Palmeiras	Total		94	21	40	2	6	0	22	3	—		163	26
Al-Ittihad	2020–21	SPL	17	1	—		0	0	1 (Note: Appearance in Arab Club Champions Cup)	0	—		18	1
Al-Ittihad	2021–22	SPL	30	1	—		3	1	1	1	—		34	3
Al-Ittihad	2022–23	SPL	26	2	—		1	0	—		2 (Note: Appearance in Saudi Super Cup)	0	29	2
Al-Ittihad	Total		73	4	—		4	1	2	1	2	0	81	6
Internacional	2023	Série A	20	2	—		—		5	0	—		25	2
Career total			324	40	160	18	19	1	35	3	2	0	543	61

== Honours ==
Londrina

- Campeonato Paranaense Série Prata: 2011

Corinthians

- Campeonato Brasileiro Série A: 2015

Palmeiras

- Campeonato Brasileiro Série A: 2018
- Campeonato Paulista: 2020
- Copa do Brasil: 2020
- Copa Libertadores: 2020

Al-Ittihad

- Saudi Professional League: 2022–23
- Saudi Super Cup: 2022

Internacional

- Campeonato Gaúcho: 2025
- Recopa Gaúcha: 2026

Individual

- Troféu Mesa Redonda Best Player: 2018
- Bola de Prata: 2018
- Campeonato Brasileiro Série A Team of the Year: 2018
