= Rildo (footballer, born 1989) =

Brazilian footballer

Personal information
- Full name: Rildo de Andrade Felicissimo
- Date of birth: 20 March 1989 (age 37)
- Place of birth: São Paulo, Brazil
- Height: 1.80 m (5 ft 11 in)
- Position: Forward

Senior career*
Years	Team	Apps	(Gls)
2009	Fernandópolis	10	(1)
2010	Ferroviária	16	(1)
2011–2012	Vitória	38	(3)
2012–2017	Ponte Preta	68	(6)
2014	→ Santos (loan)	35	(2)
2015–2016	→ Corinthians (loan)	19	(1)
2017	→ Coritiba (loan)	38	(6)
2018–2019	Vasco da Gama	15	(1)
2019	Chapecoense	9	(2)
2019	Daegu FC	11	(0)
2020	Avaí	20	(4)
2021	Paysandu	13	(3)
2022	São Caetano	9	(0)
2023	Taubaté	5	(0)
Total		306	(30)
- * Club domestic league appearances and goals

Rildo de Andrade Felicissimo (born 20 March 1989), simply known as Rildo, is a Brazilian retired footballer who played as a forward.

== Club career ==
Born in São Paulo, Rildo played amateur football in his home city until joining Fernandópolis in 2009, helping the club in Campeonato Paulista Segunda Divisão. In the following year, he moved to Ferroviária, but was rarely used.

In January 2011, Rildo signed with Vitória. On 30 July he was sent off in a 0–1 home loss against Boa Esporte, after trying to kick the referee.

On 6 June 2012, Rildo signed with Ponte Preta, for a R$300,000 fee. He made his Série A debut on the 24th, in a 2–1 away win over Botafogo. He scored his first top flight goal on 10 October, in a 2–1 home win over Náutico.

On 31 January 2014, Rildo joined Santos in a one-year loan deal. He appeared in 22 league matches for the club, scoring one goal, but Peixe opted to not sign him permanently.

On 3 July 2015, Rildo joined fellow top level club Corinthians in a loan deal until December 2016.

On 1 January 2017, Rildo signed with Coritiba. In March 2019, after a period with Vasco da Gama, he moved to Chapecoense.

Rildo subsequently played for Daegu FC, Avaí, Paysandu, São Caetano, and Taubaté, before retiring in 2023.

== Career statistics ==
Club	Season	League			State League		Cup		Continental		Other		Total	
Club	Season	Division	Apps	Goals	Apps	Goals	Apps	Goals	Apps	Goals	Apps	Goals	Apps	Goals
Fernandópolis	2009	Paulista 2ª Divisão	—		10	1	—		—		—		10	1
Ferroviária	2010	Paulista A3	—		16	1	—		—		3 (Note: Appearance(s) in Copa Paulista)	0	19	1
Vitória	2011	Série B	11	1	15	2	2	0	—		—		28	3
Vitória	2012	Série B	2	0	10	0	3	0	—		—		15	0
Vitória	Subtotal		13	1	25	2	5	0	—		—		43	3
Ponte Preta	2012	Série A	23	1	—		—		—		—		23	1
Ponte Preta	2013	Série A	28	2	8	0	3	2	7 (Note: Appearance(s) in Copa Sudamericana)	0	—		46	4
Ponte Preta	2015	Série A	2	1	7	2	1	1	—		—		10	4
Ponte Preta	Subtotal		53	4	15	2	4	3	7	0	—		79	9
Santos (loan)	2014	Série A	22	1	13	1	6	2	—		—		41	4
Corinthians (loan)	2015	Série A	12	0	—		—		—		—		12	0
Corinthians (loan)	2016	Série A	7	1	0	0	2	1	0	0	—		9	2
Corinthians (loan)	Subtotal		19	1	0	0	2	1	—		—		21	2
Coritiba	2017	Série A	34	6	4	0	1	0	—		—		39	6
Vasco da Gama	2018	Série A	5	0	9	1	—		7 (Note: Appearance(s) in Copa Libertadores)	2	—		21	3
Vasco da Gama	2019	Série A	0	0	1	0	0	0	—		—		1	0
Vasco da Gama	Subtotal		5	0	10	1	0	0	7	2	—		22	3
Chapecoense	2019	Série A	4	2	5	0	1	1	—		—		10	3
Daegu FC	2019	K League 1	11	0	—		—		—		—		11	0
Avaí	2020	Série B	11	2	9	2	1	0	—		—		21	4
Paysandu	2021	Série C	13	3	—		—		—		—		13	3
São Caetano	2022	Paulista A2	—		9	0	—		—		—		9	0
Taubaté	2023	Paulista A2	—		5	0	—		—		—		5	0
Career total			185	20	121	10	20	7	14	2	3	0	343	39

== Honours ==
Corinthians

- Campeonato Brasileiro Série A: 2015

Coritiba

- Campeonato Paranaense: 2017
