= Felipe (footballer, born 1989) =

Brazilian footballer

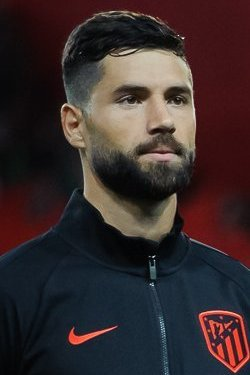
- Felipe with Atlético Madrid in 2019

Personal information
- Full name: Felipe Augusto de Almeida Monteiro
- Date of birth: 16 May 1989 (age 37)
- Place of birth: São Paulo, Brazil
- Height: 1.90 m (6 ft 3 in)
- Position: Centre-back

Youth career
- 2007–2008: Valtra

Senior career*
Years	Team	Apps	(Gls)
2009–2011	União Mogi	0	(0)
2011	→ Bragantino (loan)	34	(1)
2012–2016	Corinthians	88	(5)
2016–2019	Porto	93	(6)
2019–2023	Atlético Madrid	87	(3)
2023–2024	Nottingham Forest	23	(0)
Total		325	(15)

International career
2018–2020	Brazil	2	(0)
Medal record
Men's football
Representing Brazil
Copa América
Runner-up	2021 Brazil
- * Club domestic league appearances and goals

Felipe Augusto de Almeida Monteiro (born 16 May 1989), known simply as Felipe or Felipe Monteiro, is a Brazilian former professional footballer who played as a centre-back.

Felipe began his career with União Mogi and was loaned to Bragantino before joining Corinthians in 2012. He played 109 times for the club, winning honours including the 2012 FIFA Club World Cup and the 2015 Campeonato Brasileiro Série A. In 2016, he joined Porto, where he won a Primeira Liga title in 2018. The following year, he signed for Atlético Madrid, and won La Liga in 2021. In January 2023, he joined Nottingham Forest of the Premier League, retiring 18 months later.

He played two games for Brazil in 2018 and 2020, and was part of their squad that came runners-up at the 2021 Copa América.

== Club career ==
=== Early career ===
Born in São Paulo and raised in Mogi das Cruzes, Felipe trialled at Sport Club Corinthians Paulista at the age of 14 but was released. He then worked for his mother-in-law, delivering mushrooms to restaurants, while playing for Valtra, a tractor company works team partnered with União Futebol Clube. He turned professional there, and debuted in the Campeonato Paulista Série A2 in 2009. After playing two friendlies against Clube Atlético Bragantino of the Campeonato Brasileiro Série B in 2011, he signed for them on loan. He then won the attention of Corinthians.

=== Corinthians ===
With only 88 minutes of football to his name in his first year for Corinthians, he was a surprise inclusion for the squad chosen by manager Tite for the 2012 FIFA Club World Cup in Japan. He was unused as his club won the title against Chelsea.

In the 2015 Campeonato Brasileiro Série A, Felipe played 26 games as Corinthians won the national title. He scored his first goal in the competition on 26 July in a 1–1 draw at Coritiba Foot Ball Club, and on 9 August he was sent off in a game of the same result at city rivals São Paulo FC.

=== Porto ===
On 15 June 2016, Felipe moved abroad for the first time, signing a five-year deal at FC Porto. He made his debut on 12 August as they began their season with a 3–1 win at Rio Ave FC. On 23 August, he opened the scoring in a 3–0 win at A.S. Roma in the UEFA Champions League playoff to put Porto into the group stages 4–1 on aggregate, and five days later he scored a first league goal to open a 2–1 loss at rivals Sporting CP.

In 2017–18, Porto won the league and Felipe was one of five club players named in the Team of the Year, alongside his fellow defenders Alex Telles and Ricardo Pereira. On 3 January he headed the winner at C.D. Feirense (2–1) then was sent off for a second yellow card.

On 2 April 2019, Felipe was sent off in a 1–1 draw at S.C. Braga, though his team advanced to the 2019 Taça de Portugal Final 4–1 on aggregate. Due to his accumulation of yellow cards over the season, he missed the next two league matches. In the final on 25 May at the Estádio Nacional, he scored in added time at the end of extra time to secure a 2–2 draw with Sporting, but the Lisbon team won on penalties.

=== Atlético Madrid ===
On 27 May 2019, Felipe signed for Atlético Madrid for a fee of €20 million. The Colchoneros were seeking to boost their defence after the recent losses of Diego Godín, Juanfran and Lucas Hernandez. He scored his first goal for the club in 2–0 UEFA Champions League last matchday win against FC Lokomotiv Moscow on 11 December, qualifying his team to the knockout phase.

In 25 games for his first domestic season, Felipe scored once to win a 2–1 home game against Levante UD, with all goals scored by the 18th minute. His form dropped as the 2019–20 season concluded after a three-month COVID-19 lockdown, and the following season he fought for a place in the central defence alongside José María Giménez, Stefan Savić and Mario Hermoso, nonetheless being the most played of the four as the team won the league.

In 2021–22, Felipe was sent off three times in all competitions, including twice in the Champions League. In a group game against Liverpool, he was dismissed with a straight red for a foul on Sadio Mané, while in the quarter-finals against another English team Manchester City he got two yellows for fouls on Phil Foden, prompting a melee.

=== Nottingham Forest ===
Felipe joined Premier League side Nottingham Forest on an 18-month deal on deadline day, 31 January 2023. He made his debut 11 days later in a 2–0 loss at Fulham, as a seventh-minute substitute for the injured Scott McKenna; he made five clearances and as many interceptions, and was called "combative" and "assured" in a match report by The Athletic.

Felipe left Forest at the end of the 2023–24 season, retiring from football in the process.

== International career ==
Felipe was called up to Brazil's squad by coach Dunga for the 2018 FIFA World Cup qualifier against Paraguay in March 2016, to replace the suspended David Luiz. He made his debut for the national team on 11 September 2018, in a 5–0 friendly win against El Salvador at FedExField in the United States. His Porto teammate Éder Militão debuted in the same game.

Felipe's second game came on 9 October 2020 in a 5–0 rout of Bolivia at his former club ground of Arena Corinthians, as a 71st-minute substitute for Thiago Silva in the first game of 2022 FIFA World Cup qualification. He was included in the squad for the 2021 Copa América on home soil, but left the team, which finished runners-up, due to a right knee sprain.

== Personal life ==
Felipe was naturalised as a Spanish citizen in April 2022, which freed up a space for a non-European Union player at Atlético Madrid.

== Career statistics ==
=== Club ===
As of match played 30 March 2024

Appearances and goals by club, season and competition
Club	Season	League			National Cup (Note: Includes Copa do Brasil, Taça de Portugal, Copa del Rey and FA Cup)		League Cup (Note: Includes Taça da Liga and EFL Cup)		Continental		Other		Total	
Club	Season	Division	Apps	Goals	Apps	Goals	Apps	Goals	Apps	Goals	Apps	Goals	Apps	Goals
Bragantino (loan)	2011	Série B	33	1	0	0	—		—		1 (Note: Appearance(s) in Campeonato Paulista)	0	34	1
Corinthians	2012	Série A	3	0	0	0	—		0	0	1	0	4	0
Corinthians	2013	Série A	6	0	1	0	—		1 (Note: Appearance(s) in Copa Libertadores)	0	6	1	14	1
Corinthians	2014	Série A	11	0	2	1	—		—		5	0	18	1
Corinthians	2015	Série A	26	1	2	0	—		9	2	11	1	48	4
Corinthians	2016	Série A	7	0	0	0	—		7	0	12	2	25	2
Corinthians	Total		53	1	5	1	—		17	2	35	4	109	8
Porto	2016–17	Primeira Liga	32	2	1	0	2	0	10 (Note: Appearance(s) in UEFA Champions League)	1	—		45	3
Porto	2017–18	Primeira Liga	30	3	4	0	3	0	7	1	—		44	4
Porto	2018–19	Primeira Liga	31	1	7	2	4	0	10	1	1 (Note: Appearance in Supertaça Cândido de Oliveira)	0	53	4
Porto	Total		93	6	12	2	9	0	27	3	1	0	142	11
Atlético Madrid	2019–20	La Liga	25	1	1	0	—		8	1	2 (Note: Appearance(s) in Supercopa de España)	0	36	2
Atlético Madrid	2020–21	La Liga	31	0	2	0	—		5	0	—		38	0
Atlético Madrid	2021–22	La Liga	26	2	2	0	—		7	0	0	0	35	2
Atlético Madrid	2022–23	La Liga	5	0	2	0	—		1	0	—		8	0
Atlético Madrid	Total		87	3	7	0	—		21	1	2	0	117	4
Nottingham Forest	2022–23	Premier League	16	0	—		0	0	—		—		16	0
Nottingham Forest	2023–24	Premier League	7	0	—		2	0	—		—		9	0
Nottingham Forest	Total		23	0	—		2	0	—		—		25	0
Career total			289	11	24	3	11	0	65	6	39	4	428	24

=== International ===
As of match played 9 October 2020

National team	Year	Apps	Goals
Brazil	2018	1	0
Brazil	2020	1	0
Total		2	0

== Honours ==
Corinthians

- Campeonato Brasileiro Série A: 2015
- Campeonato Paulista: 2013
- Recopa Sudamericana: 2013
- FIFA Club World Cup: 2012

Porto

- Primeira Liga: 2017–18
- Supertaça Cândido de Oliveira: 2018

Atletico Madrid

- La Liga: 2020–21

Individual

- Campeonato Paulista Team of the Year: 2016
- SJPF Primeira Liga Team of the Year: 2017
- Primeira Liga Team of the Year: 2018
