= Uendel =

Brazilian footballer

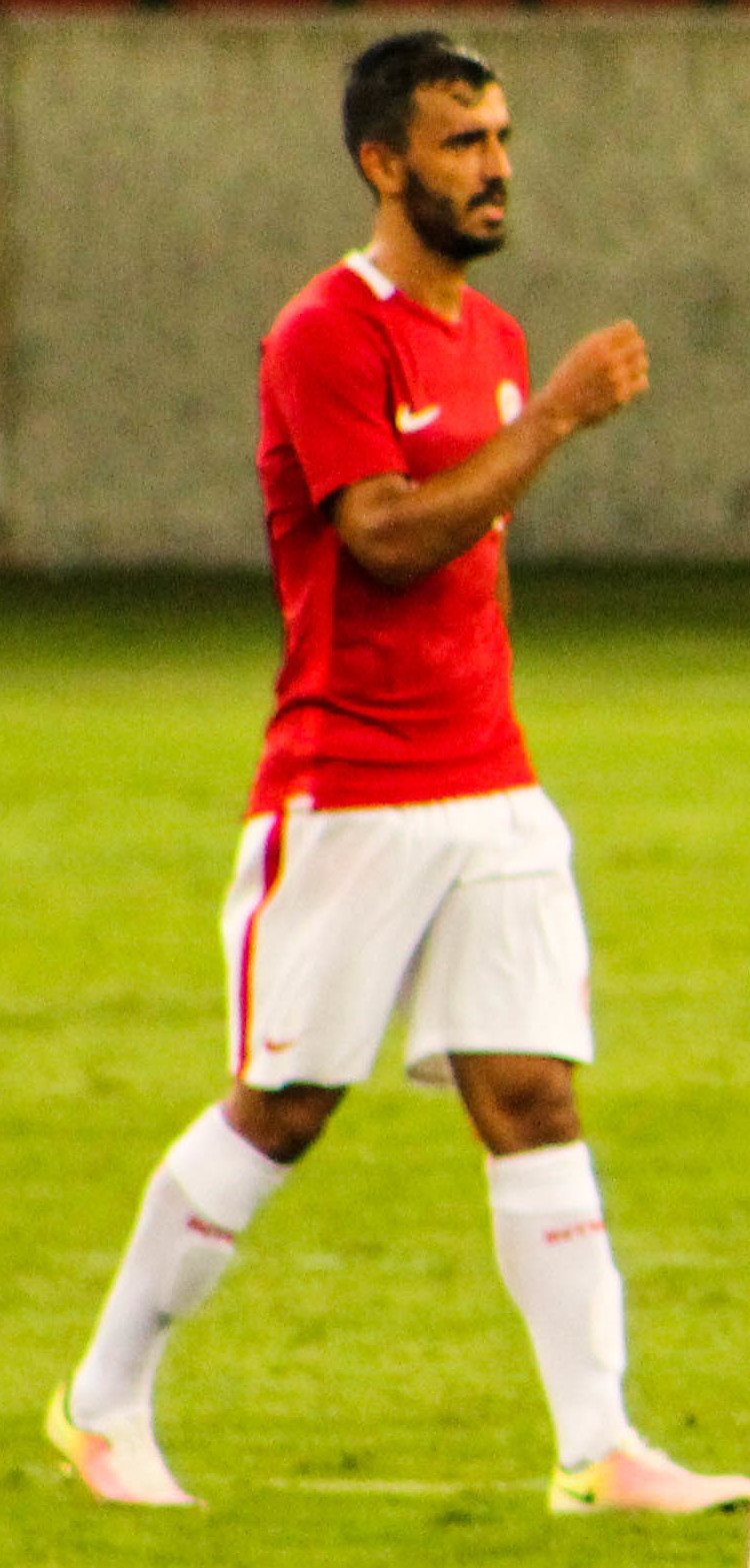
- Uendel playing for Internacional in 2017

Personal information
- Full name: Uendel Pereira Gonçalves
- Date of birth: 8 October 1988 (age 38)
- Place of birth: Araranguá, Brazil
- Height: 1.79 m (5 ft 10 1/2 in)
- Position: Left back

Youth career
- Criciúma

Senior career*
Years	Team	Apps	(Gls)
2005–2008	Criciúma	47	(5)
2008–2009	Fluminense	3	(0)
2009	→ Avaí (loan)	37	(2)
2010	Avaí	19	(0)
2010–2012	Grêmio	0	(0)
2010	→ Flamengo (loan)	0	(0)
2011–2012	→ Ponte Preta (loan)	71	(9)
2013	Ponte Preta	51	(2)
2014–2016	Corinthians	91	(6)
2017–2021	Internacional	101	(1)
2021–2023	Cuiabá	70	(1)
- * Club domestic league appearances and goals as of 18:53, 24 February 2023 (UTC)

Uendel Pereira Gonçalves (born 8 October 1988), simply known as Uendel, is a former Brazilian professional footballer who played as left back.

== Career ==
Born in Araranguá, Uendel began his career in the youth team of Criciúma, in 2007 he ascended to the professional squad and was one of the highlights of the Santa Catarina State League and calling Fluminense's attention.

At the time spent in Rio he didn't have many opportunities and because of that he signed with Avaí. He won the State League and had a great campaign in the 2009 Brazilian Serie A, taking the place in the first team leaving Eltinho as his substitute.

After playing only one match in the Brazilian Série A he signed with Grêmio, but with little space in the club, Uendel moved to Flamengo on loan until the end of 2011.

On 14 March 2021, Uendel left Internacional and signed for Cuiabá, newly promoted to the top tier.

== Career statistics ==
As of 24 February 2023

Club	Season	League			State League		Cup		Continental		Other		Total	
Club	Season	Division	Apps	Goals	Apps	Goals	Apps	Goals	Apps	Goals	Apps	Goals	Apps	Goals
Criciúma	2005	Série B	1	0	0	0	—		—		—		1	0
Criciúma	2006	Série C	1	0	2	0	—		—		—		3	0
Criciúma	2007	Série B	17	0	4	1	—		—		—		21	1
Criciúma	2008	Série B	0	0	22	4	5	1	—		—		27	5
Criciúma	Total		19	0	28	5	5	1	—		—		52	6
Fluminense	2008	Série A	3	0	—		—		—		—		3	0
Avaí	2009	Série A	18	0	19	2	—		—		—		37	2
Avaí	2010	Série A	1	0	18	0	5	0	—		—		24	0
Avaí	Total		19	0	37	2	5	0	—		—		61	2
Ponte Preta	2011	Série B	27	4	5	0	—		—		—		32	4
Ponte Preta	2012	Série A	21	1	18	4	4	1	—		—		43	6
Ponte Preta	2013	Série A	32	2	19	0	1	0	9 (Note: Appearance(s) in Copa Sudamericana)	2	—		61	4
Ponte Preta	Total		80	7	42	4	5	1	9	2	—		136	14
Corinthians	2014	Série A	6	0	13	1	2	0	—		—		21	1
Corinthians	2015	Série A	19	2	8	0	2	0	6 (Note: Appearance(s) in Copa Libertadores)	0	—		35	2
Corinthians	2016	Série A	33	2	12	1	2	0	7	0	—		54	3
Corinthians	Total		58	4	33	2	6	0	13	0	—		110	6
Internacional	2017	Série B	35	1	16	0	7	0	—		2 (Note: Appearance(s) in Primeira Liga)	0	60	1
Internacional	2018	Série A	3	0	3	0	1	0	—		—		7	0
Internacional	2019	Série A	20	0	7	0	7	0	4	0	—		38	0
Internacional	2020	Série A	14	0	3	0	2	0	7	0	—		26	0
Internacional	Total		72	1	29	0	17	0	11	0	2	0	131	1
Cuiabá	2021	Série A	35	0	9	0	1	0	—		—		45	0
Cuiabá	2022	Série A	16	1	10	0	3	0	1	0	—		30	1
Cuiabá	2023	Série A	0	0	0	0	0	0	—		—		0	0
Cuiabá	Total		51	1	19	0	4	0	1	0	—		75	1
Career total			302	13	188	13	42	2	34	2	2	0	568	30

== Honours ==
Avaí

- Campeonato Catarinense: 2009, 2010

Corinthians

- Campeonato Brasileiro Série A: 2015

Cuiabá

- Campeonato Mato-Grossense: 2021

=== Individual ===
- Campeonato Catarinense Best XI: 2010
