= Alan Mineiro =

Brazilian footballer (born 1987)

Personal information
- Full name: Alan Cássio da Cruz
- Date of birth: 29 September 1987 (age 39)
- Place of birth: Três Corações, Brazil
- Height: 1.76 m (5 ft 9 in)
- Position: Attacking midfielder

Senior career*
Years	Team	Apps	(Gls)
2007	Rio Branco-PR	22	(4)
2008	São Bernardo	29	(6)
2009	Guaraní	28	(0)
2010	Olé Brasil	15	(1)
2011	Águia Negra	7	(1)
2011–2013	Paulista	51	(11)
2012	→ Albirex Niigata (loan)	25	(4)
2014–2015	Ferroviária	17	(3)
2014	→ Boa Esporte (loan)	2	(0)
2014	→ Icasa (loan)	4	(0)
2015	→ Bragantino (loan)	35	(12)
2016–2016	Corinthians	9	(1)
2016	→ América-MG (loan)	11	(0)
2016	→ Bragantino (loan)	13	(3)
2017	→ Ferroviária (loan)	0	(0)
2017	Vila Nova	35	(11)
2018	Fortaleza	11	(0)
2018–2021	Vila Nova	121	(34)
- * Club domestic league appearances and goals as of 30 May 2018

Alan Cássio da Cruz (born 29 September 1987), known as Alan Mineiro, is a Brazilian footballer who plays as an attacking midfielder.

He is known for being a skilled dribbler and a free kick specialist.

== Club statistics ==
As of match played 28 April 2016.

Club	Season	National League			State League		Cup		Continental		Other		Total	
Club	Season	Division	Apps	Goals	Apps	Goals	Apps	Goals	Apps	Goals	Apps	Goals	Apps	Goals
São Bernardo	2008	Paulista Série A3	—		10	0	—		—		—		10	0
Guaraní	2009	División Profesional	28	0	—		—		—		—		28	0
Olé Brasil	2010	Paulista 2ª Divisão	—		23	1	—		—		—		23	1
Paulista	2011	Paulista	—		—		—		—		27 (Note: Appearance(s) in Copa Paulista)	7	27	7
Paulista	2013	Paulista	—		5	0	—		—		12	3	17	3
Paulista	Total		0	0	5	0	0	0	0	0	39	10	44	10
Albirex Niigata (loan)	2012	J1 League	22	3	—		3	1	—		—		25	4
Ferroviária	2014	Paulista A2	—		18	8	—		—		3	0	21	8
Ferroviária	2015	Paulista A2	—		16	8	—		—		—		16	8
Ferroviária	Total		0	0	34	16	0	0	0	0	3	0	37	16
Boa Esporte (loan)	2014	Série B	2	0	—		0	0	—		—		2	0
Icasa (loan)	2014	Série B	4	0	—		—		—		—		4	0
Bragantino (loan)	2015	Série B	35	12	—		0	0	—		—		35	12
Corinthians	2016	Série A	0	0	8	2	1	0	2 (Note: Appearance(s) in Copa Libertadores)	0	—		11	2
Career total			91	15	80	19	3	1	2	0	42	10	219	45
