= Lincom =

Brazilian footballer (born 1984)

Personal information
- Full name: Orlando Francisco Pires Júnior
- Date of birth: 17 February 1984 (age 42)
- Place of birth: Camapuã, Brazil
- Height: 1.93 m (6 ft 4 in)
- Position: Striker

Youth career
- Bandeirante-SP
- Lemense
- Internacional

Senior career*
Years	Team	Apps	(Gls)
2003	Lemense		
2004	Portuguesa Santista		
2004–2005	Araçatuba		
2006	Sertãozinho		
2007	Westerlo	3	(0)
2007–2008	CRAC		
2008–2009	Rio Branco-SP	?	(20)
2009	Sport	3	(0)
2010	Ituano	10	(3)
2010–2011	Criciúma	13	(3)
2011–2016	Bragantino	110	(45)
2014	→ Chongqing Lifan (loan)	7	(0)
2015	→ Penapolense (loan)	1	(0)
2015	→ Corinthians (loan)	3	(0)
2017	São Caetano	18	(6)
2017	Brasil de Pelotas	29	(8)
2018	Santo André	12	(2)
2018	Vila Nova	2	(0)
- * Club domestic league appearances and goals

Orlando Francisco Pires Júnior (born 17 February 1984), commonly known as Lincom, is a Brazilian former footballer.

== Club career ==
Born in Camapuã, Mato Grosso do Sul, Lincom moved to Birigui, São Paulo at the age of two. After graduating with Internacional, he made his debuts as a senior with Lemense, a club he already represented as a youth, in 2003.

After representing Portuguesa Santista, Araçatuba and Sertãozinho, Lincom moved to Belgian Pro League side Westerlo in January 2007. He made his debut in the category on 17 March, coming on as a late substitute for Patrick Ogunsoto in a 1–0 home win against Mouscron.

Lincom appeared rarely and subsequently returned to Brazil in the 2007 summer, with CRAC. In 2009, while at Rio Branco, he scored 20 goals in Campeonato Paulista Série A2, and subsequently moved to Série A club Sport Recife.

Lincom made his debut in the main category of Brazilian football on 16 August 2009, playing the last 18 minutes in a 1–2 home loss against São Paulo. On 17 November, after appearing in only three matches, he rescinded his contract and moved to Ituano.

Lincom subsequently moved to Criciúma, scoring three goals as his side achieved promotion to Série B. On 4 July 2011 he moved to Bragantino, also in the second division.

Lincom scored 20 goals during the year's Série B, being the second best goalscorer in the category. He continued to appear regularly for Massa Bruta until March 2014, when he was loaned to Chinese side Chongqing Lifan.

Lincom returned to Bragantino in July, and appeared regularly until the end of the year. After a short spell at Penapolense, he was loaned to Corinthians until the end of 2015, still owned by Braga.

Lincom left Bragantino at the end of the 2016 season, citing delays in wages being paid. He subsequently joined São Caetano for the 2017 Campeonato Paulista Série A2 season, and helped them win the title. He moved on for the second half of the season, joining Brasil de Pelotas on 29 May 2017, three games into the 2017 Campeonato Brasileiro Série B season.

== Honours ==
Corinthians

- Campeonato Brasileiro Série A: 2015

São Caetano

- Campeonato Paulista Série A2: 2017
