= Rodrigo Sam =

Brazilian footballer (born 1995)

Personal information
- Full name: Rodrigo Eduardo da Silva
- Date of birth: 24 July 1995 (age 31)
- Place of birth: Marília, Brazil
- Height: 1.85 m (6 ft 1 in)
- Position: Centre back

Team information
- Current team: Juventude
- Number: 34

Youth career
- 2010–2012: Stadium BR
- 2012–2014: Marília
- 2014–2015: Corinthians

Senior career*
Years	Team	Apps	(Gls)
2014	Marília	18	(0)
2014–2018	Corinthians	1	(0)
2016	→ Tigres do Brasil (loan)	9	(1)
2016	→ Bragantino (loan)	12	(0)
2017	→ Água Santa (loan)	18	(1)
2017	→ Oeste (loan)	5	(0)
2018	→ Ituano (loan)	5	(0)
2018	→ Boa Esporte (loan)	1	(0)
2018	→ Novorizontino (loan)	0	(0)
2019	Água Santa	14	(1)
2019	Nacional-SP	0	(0)
2020	Marcílio Dias	1	(0)
2020–2023	Água Santa	37	(3)
2021	→ Oeste (loan)	6	(0)
2021	→ XV de Piracicaba (loan)	0	(0)
2022	→ Mirassol (loan)	23	(4)
2023	Mirassol	23	(0)
2024–	Juventude	81	(5)
- * Club domestic league appearances and goals as of 16 November 2026

Rodrigo Eduardo da Silva (born 24 July 1995), known as Rodrigo Sam, is a Brazilian professional footballer who plays as centre back for Juventude.

== Career ==
In 2010, Rodrigo joined a project based in his hometown to discover young talents called Stadium BR. The club is a company that focus only on youth squads. He nearly moved to PTSC in Londrina, before signing with Marília in 2012. Rodrigo made his professional debut for Marília at the Campeonato Paulista A2 in 2014, being an important part in the Marília team that gained the access to division A1 of the same tournament. After the tournament ended, he signed with Corinthians, but was moved directly to their youth squad. He won the 2014 U20 Campeonato Paulista, 2014 U20 Campeonato Brasileiro and the 2015 Copa São Paulo de Futebol Júnior. He was promoted to Corinthians main squad in February 2015, right after the end of Copa São Paulo de Futebol Júnior.

Rodrigo was part of the main squad for the 2015 Campeonato Paulista and 2015 Copa Libertadores. He made his debut for Corinthians in an away match against XV de Piracicaba at the first stage of the 2015 Campeonato Paulista.

== Career statistics ==
As of 22 February 2024

Club	Season	League			State League		Cup		Continental		Other		Total	
Club	Season	Division	Apps	Goals	Apps	Goals	Apps	Goals	Apps	Goals	Apps	Goals	Apps	Goals
Marília	2014	Paulista A2	—		18	0	—		—		—		18	0
Corinthians	2015	Série A	0	0	1	0	0	0	0	0	—		1	0
Tigres do Brasil (loan)	2016	Carioca	—		9	1	—		—		—		9	1
Bragantino (loan)	2016	Série B	12	0	—		1	0	—		10 (Note: Appearance(s) in Copa Paulista)	0	23	0
Água Santa (loan)	2017	Paulista A2	—		18	1	—		—		—		18	1
Oeste (loan)	2017	Série B	5	0	—		—		—		—		5	0
Ituano (loan)	2018	Paulista	—		5	0	0	0	—		—		5	0
Boa Esporte (loan)	2018	Série B	1	0	—		—		—		—		1	0
Novorizontino (loan)	2018	Série D	—		—		—		—		15	1	15	1
Água Santa	2019	Paulista A2	—		14	1	—		—		—		14	1
Nacional-SP	2019	Paulista A2	—		—		—		—		10	0	10	0
Marcílio Dias	2020	Série D	0	0	1	0	—		—		—		1	0
Água Santa	2020	Paulista	—		1	0	—		—		10	1	11	1
Água Santa	2021	Paulista A2	—		14	2	—		—		—		14	2
Água Santa	2022	Paulista	—		11	1	—		—		—		11	1
Água Santa	2023	Paulista	—		11	0	—		—		—		11	0
Água Santa	Total		—		37	3	—		—		10	1	47	4
Oeste (loan)	2021	Série C	6	0	—		—		—		—		6	0
XV de Piracicaba (loan)	2021	Paulista A2	—		—		—		—		6	0	6	0
Mirassol (loan)	2022	Série C	23	4	—		—		—		—		23	4
Mirassol	2023	Série B	23	0	—		—		—		—		23	0
Juventude	2024	Série A	0	0	3	0	0	0	—		—		3	0
Career total			70	4	106	6	1	0	0	0	51	2	228	12

== Honours ==
Corinthians

- Campeonato Brasileiro Série A: 2015

Água Santa

- Campeonato Paulista Série A2: 2021
