= Léo Príncipe =

Brazilian association football player

Personal information
- Full name: Leonardo Peixoto Príncipe
- Date of birth: 13 August 1996 (age 30)
- Place of birth: Rio de Janeiro, Brazil
- Height: 1.73 m (5 ft 8 in)
- Position: Right-back

Team information
- Current team: Amazonas

Youth career
- 2009–2010: CFZ
- 2011–2012: Vasco da Gama
- 2013: Flamengo
- 2014–2015: Corinthians

Senior career*
Years	Team	Apps	(Gls)
2016–2019	Corinthians	16	(1)
2016	→ Oeste (loan)	8	(0)
2018	→ Le Havre II (loan)	6	(0)
2019	→ Guarani (loan)	10	(0)
2019	→ Paraná (loan)	7	(0)
2020	CRB	1	(0)
2021	São José	6	(0)
2022	Krumovgrad		
2022–2023	Primorje	22	(2)
2023	Amazonas	1	(0)
2024	Pouso Alegre	7	(0)
2025	Sobradinho	7	(1)
2026–	ASA	10	(0)
- * Club domestic league appearances and goals as of 19 November 2026

Leonardo Peixoto Príncipe (born 13 August 1996), known as Léo Príncipe, is a Brazilian professional footballer who plays as a right-back for Amazonas.

== career ==
=== Early career ===
Born in Rio de Janeiro, Príncipe started his career when he was 13 years old at CFZ, a club originally created by former Brazilian football legend Zico. He departed the club and spent two years at Vasco da Gama, then another year at Flamengo. After that, he joined Corinthians and won the 2014 U20 Campeonato Paulista, 2014 U20 Campeonato Brasileiro and the 2015 Copa São Paulo de Futebol Júnior, also being a runner up at the 2014 and 2016 editions.

=== Oeste (loan) ===
Príncipe was loaned to Oeste on 3 February for the remaining of the year as part of the squad for the 2016 Campeonato Paulista and 2016 Campeonato Brasileiro Série B.

He made his professional debut as part of the starting team against Corinthians on 21 February. He participated in seven games during the team's campaign at the Campeonato Paulista and also on the debut at the Série B. He was called back by Corinthians on 15 May.

After six months on loan with Le Havre in France, he signed in January 2019 with Guarani again on loan for one year.

In 2022, he had a stint with Bulgarian team Krumovgrad, which at the time played in the country's third league.

== Honours ==
Corinthians

- Campeonato Brasileiro Série A: 2017
- Campeonato Paulista: 2017
