= Guilherme Mantuan =

Brazilian footballer (born 1997)

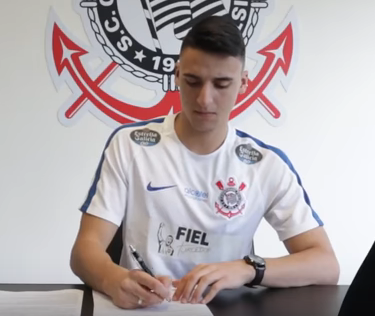
- Mantuan in 2015

Personal information
- Full name: Guilherme Mantuan
- Date of birth: 2 August 1997 (age 29)
- Place of birth: São Paulo, Brazil
- Height: 1.76 m (5 ft 9 in)
- Positions: Midfielder; right-back

Team information
- Current team: Nove Hamburgo

Youth career
- 2004–2016: Corinthians

Senior career*
| Years | Team | Apps | (Gls) |
| 2017–2020 | Corinthians | 15 | (0) |
| 2019 | → Ponte Preta (loan) | 1 | (0) |
| 2020 | → Oeste (loan) | 2 | (0) |
| 2020–2021 | Gil Vicente | 0 | (0) |
| 2022–2024 | Botafogo–SP | 28 | (0) |
| 2024 | Amazonas | 0 | (0) |
| 2024–2025 | Botafogo-PB | 2 | (0) |
| 2025–2026 | SER Caxias | 10 | (1) |
| 2026– | Nove Hamburgo | 0 | (0) |
- * Club domestic league appearances and goals as of 10:41, 9 August 2026 (UTC)

Guilherme Mantuan (born 2 August 1997) is a Brazilian professional footballer who plays forNove Hamburgo.

He is the older brother of Gustavo Mantuan.

== Club career ==
Born in São Paulo, Mantuan arrived at the academy of Corinthians in 2004 and initially played for the futsal team. In September 2016, he was promoted to the first team and signed a contract till the end of 2018. He captained the junior team which won the São Paulo Junior Football Cup in 2017.

On 30 June 2017, Mantuan signed a contract extension which would keep him at the club till the end of 2020. He made his first team debut on 3 December, coming as a substitute for Pedrinho in a 1–0 defeat against Sport Recife.

On 18 December 2018, Mantuan was loaned out to Ponte Preta for the upcoming season.

== Career statistics ==
As of match played 9 September 2018

Appearances and goals by club, season and competition
| Club | Season | League | | | State League | | National Cup | | Continental | | Total | |
| Club | Season | Division | Apps | Goals | Apps | Goals | Apps | Goals | Apps | Goals | Apps | Goals |
|---|---|---|---|---|---|---|---|---|---|---|---|---|
| Corinthians | 2017 | Série A | 1 | 0 | 0 | 0 | 0 | 0 | 0 | 0 | 1 | 0 |
| Corinthians | 2018 | Série A | 14 | 0 | 5 | 0 | 1 | 0 | 3 (Note: Appearance in Copa Libertadores) | 0 | 23 | 0 |
| Career total | | | 15 | 0 | 5 | 0 | 1 | 0 | 3 | 0 | 24 | 0 |

== Honours ==
Corinthians

- Campeonato Brasileiro Série A: 2017
- Campeonato Paulista: 2018
