= Matheus Vidotto =

Brazilian footballer

Personal information
- Full name: Matheus Caldeira Vidotto de Oliveira
- Date of birth: 10 April 1993 (age 33)
- Place of birth: São Paulo, Brazil
- Height: 1.90 m (6 ft 3 in)
- Position: Goalkeeper

Team information
- Current team: Tokyo Verdy
- Number: 1

Youth career
- 2004–2013: Corinthians

Senior career*
Years	Team	Apps	(Gls)
2012–2018	Corinthians	2	(0)
2019	Figueirense	10	(0)
2020–	Tokyo Verdy	217	(0)
- * Club domestic league appearances and goals as of 8 August 2026

Matheus Caldeira Vidotto de Oliveira (born 10 April 1993) is a Brazilian footballer who currently plays for Tokyo Verdy.

== Career ==
=== Early life ===
Matheus began playing for Corinthians' academy at the age of eleven and had a very successful campaign. He won the 2012 Copa São Paulo de Futebol Júnior. He also had to deal with three surgeries due to Wolff–Parkinson–White syndrome.

=== Corinthians ===
Matheus was moved to the first team in 2012, but only made his professional debut on 22 July 2015, as he entered in the second half of Corinthians' 1–0 victory against ABC at Frasqueirão stadium in Natal. His official debut took place on 24 February 2016 as he started in a 2016 Campeonato Paulista match against São Bento.

=== Figuirense ===
Matheus joined to Figuirense for 2019 season. He left the club in 2019 after a season at Figuirense.

=== Tokyo Verdy ===
On 15 January 2020, Matheus abroad to Japan and announcement officially transfer to J2 club, Tokyo Verdy for ahead of 2020 season. Although he was late in the early part of the season due to a breakdown, he contributed to the buildup with his good foot skills and grabbed a position in the 4th round. As a result, he played in 37 games this year.

== International career ==
In April 2013, Matheus was called up by Luiz Felipe Scolari for a friendly against Bolivia, despite never playing professionally before. He was an unused substitute.

== Career statistics ==
As of matches played on 22 September 2024.

Club	Season	League			State League (Note: Includes Campeonato Paulista, Campeonato Catarinense)		National cup (Note: Includes Copa do Brasil, Emperor's Cup)		Continental		Other		Total	
Club	Season	Division	Apps	Goals	Apps	Goals	Apps	Goals	Apps	Goals	Apps	Goals	Apps	Goals
Corinthians	2013	Série A	0	0	0	0	0	0	0	0	—		0	0
Corinthians	2014	Série A	0	0	0	0	0	0	—		—		0	0
Corinthians	2015	Série A	0	0	0	0	0	0	0	0	—		0	0
Corinthians	2016	Série A	0	0	2	0	0	0	0	0	—		2	0
Corinthians	2017	Série A	0	0	0	0	0	0	0	0	—		0	0
Corinthians	Total		0	0	2	0	0	0	0	0	0	0	2	0
Figueirense	2019	Série B	10	0	0	0	0	0	—		—		10	0
Tokyo Verdy	2020	J2 League	37	0	—		0	0	—		—		37	0
Tokyo Verdy	2021	J2 League	34	0	—		0	0	—		—		34	0
Tokyo Verdy	2022	J2 League	20	0	—		3	0	—		—		23	0
Tokyo Verdy	2023	J2 League	42	0	—		1	0	—		2 (Note: Appearance(s) in Promotion play-offs)	0	45	0
Tokyo Verdy	2024	J1 League	31	0	—		1	0	—		0	0	32	0
Tokyo Verdy	Total		164	0	0	0	5	0	0	0	2	0	171	0
Career total			174	0	2	0	5	0	0	0	2	0	183	0

== Honours ==
Corinthians

- Campeonato Brasileiro Série A: 2015, 2017
