= Renan (footballer, born December 1990) =

Brazilian footballer

Personal information
- Full name: Renan Soares Reuter
- Date of birth: 12 December 1990 (age 35)
- Place of birth: São João Batista, Brazil
- Height: 1.92 m (6 ft 3 1/2 in)
- Position: Goalkeeper

Youth career
- 2007–2009: Avaí

Senior career*
Years	Team	Apps	(Gls)
2009–2011	Avaí	27	(0)
2011–2016	Corinthians	3	(0)
2012	→ Vitória (loan)	1	(0)
2012–2013	→ Estoril (loan)	2	(0)
2013	→ Guarani (loan)	0	(0)
2014	→ Botafogo-SP (loan)	0	(0)
2014	→ Bragantino (loan)	17	(0)
2015	→ Caxias (loan)	0	(0)
2015–2016	→ Tigres do Brasil (loan)	0	(0)
- * Club domestic league appearances and goals

Renan Soares Reuter, better known as Renan, (born 12 December 1990 in São João Batista) is a Brazilian football goalkeeper who last played for Tigres do Brasil, on loan from Corinthians.

== Club career ==
Renan began his professional career in Avaí, where he won the state championship. He was chosen as the first goalkeeper when his teammate Zé Carlos was injured, so he took the goalkeeper position at the beginning of 2010 Brazilian Série A.

Renan signed a five-year contract with Corinthians on 3 June 2011.

== International career ==
On July 26, 2010, he was called up for the first time to the Brazil national team. It was the first time that a footballer playing at a club from the Santa Catarina state received a call-up for the national team.

== Honours ==
Avaí

- Campeonato Catarinense: 2010

== Career statistics ==
Club performance
Club	Season	Brasileirão Série A		Brasileirão Série B		Copa do Brasil		Libertadores		Copa Sudamericana		State League		Friendly		Total
Club	Season	App	Goals	App	Goals	App	Goals	App	Goals	App	Goals	App	Goals	App	Goals	App	Goals
Avaí	2010	24	0	0	0	0	0	0	0	1	0	2	0	0	0	27	0
Avaí	2011	0	0	0	0	6	0	0	0	0	0	0	0	0	0	6	0
Corinthians	2011	3	0	0	0	0	0	0	0	0	0	0	0	1	0	4	0
Vitória	2012	0	0	1	0	5	0	0	0	0	0	12	0	0	0	18	0
Estoril Praia	2012-2013	0	0	0	0	0	0	0	0	0	0	0	0	0	0	0	0
Total		27	0	1	0	11	0	0	0	1	0	14	0	1	0	55	0
