= Caíque França =

Brazilian footballer (born 1995)

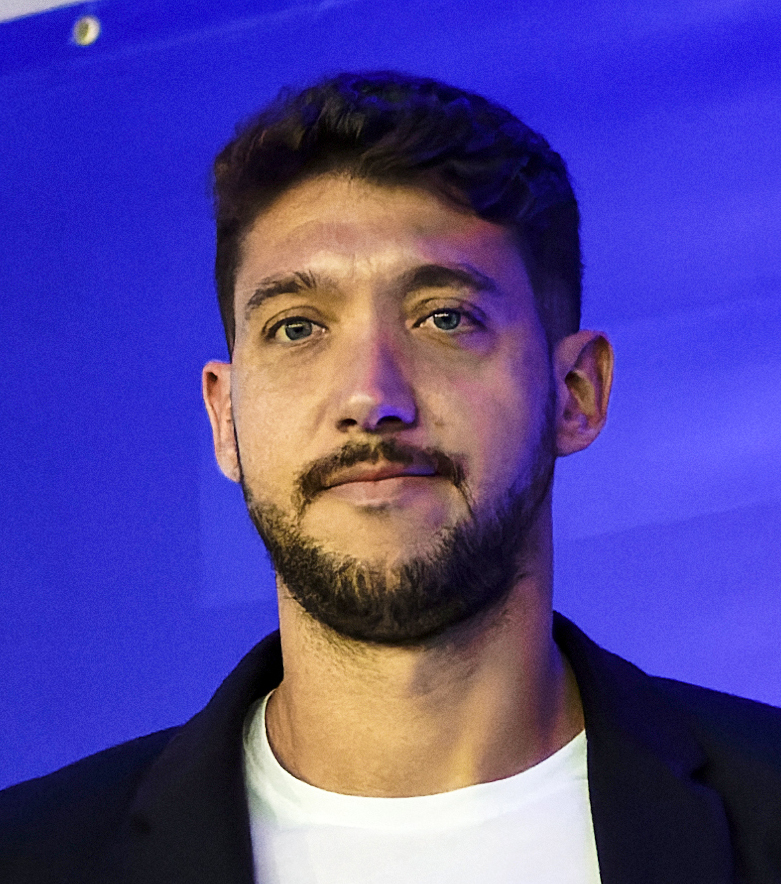

Personal information
- Full name: Caíque França Godoy
- Date of birth: 3 June 1995 (age 31)
- Place of birth: São Paulo, Brazil
- Height: 1.86 m (6 ft 1 in)
- Position: Goalkeeper

Team information
- Current team: Ceará (on loan from Guarani)
- Number: 23

Youth career
- 2003–2016: Corinthians

Senior career*
Years	Team	Apps	(Gls)
2016–2021	Corinthians	6	(0)
2020–2021	→ Oeste (loan)	28	(0)
2022–2023	Ponte Preta	71	(0)
2024–2025	Sport Recife	69	(0)
2026–	Guarani	26	(0)
2026–	→ Ceará (loan)	1	(0)
- * Club domestic league appearances and goals as of 18 November 2026

Caíque França Godoy (born 3 June 1995) is a Brazilian footballer who plays as goalkeeper for Ceará, on loan from Guarani.

== Professional career ==
Caíque made his professional debut for Corinthians in a 3-1 Campeonato Brasileiro Série A win over Botafogo on 19 June 2016. He would be given a cap again in an 8 November 2017 0–1 win over Atlético Paranaense, coming in as a substitute for an injured Walter, who was himself replacing first goalkeeper Cássio, who was with Brazil at the time. With Cássio out for Brazil and Walter injured, Caíque was Corinthians' goalkeeper for two more matches of the 2017 Campeonato Brasileiro Série A.

== Career statistics ==
As of match played 5 February 2025

Appearances and goals by club, season and competition
Club	Season	League			State league		Copa do Brasil		Continental		Other		Total	
Club	Season	Division	Apps	Goals	Apps	Goals	Apps	Goals	Apps	Goals	Apps	Goals	Apps	Goals
Corinthians	2013	Série A	0	0	0	0	0	0	0	0	—		0	0
Corinthians	2015	Série A	0	0	0	0	0	0	0	0	—		0	0
Corinthians	2016	Série A	1	0	0	0	0	0	0	0	—		1	0
Corinthians	2017	Série A	3	0	1 (Note: Appearance(s) in Campeonato Paulista Série A1)	0	0	0	0	0	—		4	0
Corinthians	2018	Série A	0	0	0	0	0	0	0	0	—		0	0
Corinthians	2019	Série A	1	0	0	0	0	0	0	0	—		1	0
Corinthians	2020	Série A	0	0	0	0	0	0	0	0	—		0	0
Corinthians	2021	Série A	0	0	0	0	0	0	0	0	—		0	0
Corinthians	Total		5	0	1	0	0	0	0	0	0	0	6	0
Oeste (loan)	2020	Série B	20	0	8	0	0	0	—		—		28	0
Ponte Preta	2022	Série B	35	0	0	0	0	0	—		—		35	0
Ponte Preta	2023	Série B	36	0	20 (Note: Appearance(s) in Campeonato Paulista Série A2)	0	2	0	—		—		58	0
Ponte Preta	Total		71	0	20	0	2	0	0	0	0	0	93	0
Sport Recife	2024	Série B	37	0	9 (Note: Appearance(s) in Campeonato Pernambucano)	0	4	0	—		9 (Note: Appearance(s) in Copa do Nordeste)	0	59	0
Sport Recife	2025	Série A	0	0	2	0	0	0	—		2	0	4	0
Sport Recife	Total		37	0	11	0	4	0	0	0	11	0	63	0
Career total			133	0	40	0	6	0	0	0	11	0	190	0

== Honours ==
Corinthians

- Campeonato Brasileiro Série A: 2017
- Campeonato Paulista: 2017, 2018, 2019

Ponte Preta

- Campeonato Paulista Série A2: 2023

Sport Recife

- Campeonato Pernambucano: 2024
