= Ricardo Marques =

Ricardo Marques may refer to:

- Ricardo Marques (referee)
- Ricardo Marques (politician)
