= 2020 Sport Club Corinthians Paulista season =

Corinthians
2020 season
- President: Andrés Sánchez (until 3 January 2021); Duílio Monteiro Alves (from 4 January 2021)
- Manager: Tiago Nunes (until 11 September); Dyego Coelho (interim, 11 September – 11 October); Vágner Mancini (from 12 October)
- Stadium: Neo Química Arena (Named Arena Corinthians until 1 September)
- Série A: 12th
- Copa do Brasil: Round of 16
- Campeonato Paulista: Runners-up
- Copa Libertadores: Second stage
- Top goalscorer: League: Jô (6); All: Jô (8)
- Highest home attendance: 40,935 vs Santos (2 February 2020)
- Lowest home attendance: 17,401 vs Santo André (26 February 2020)
Home colors	Away colors	Third colors

The 2020 season was the 111th season in the history of Sport Club Corinthians Paulista. The season was largerly affected by the COVID-19 pandemic, as it had a major pause between March and July, and the majority of games were played behind closed doors. It covered the period from January 2020 to 25 February 2021.

== Background ==
=== Kits ===
- Home (July 2020 onward): White shirt, black shorts and white socks;
- Away (July 2020 onward): Black with white stripes shirt, white shorts and black socks;
- Third (October 2020 onward): Brown and blue shirt, brown shorts and brown socks.

=== Previous Kits ===
- Home (Until June 2020): White shirt with black stripes, black shorts and white socks;
- Away (Until July 2020): Black shirt, white shorts and black socks;
- Third (Until September 2020): Black and white shirt, black shorts and black socks.

=== COVID-19 pandemic ===
On 25 February 2020, the first case of COVID-19 was confirmed in Brazil. No decision was made regarding sports events at first, but after the disease started spreading quickly, it was announced on March 13 that some of the 2020 Campeonato Paulista matches would take place behind closed doors. Eventually on March 16, after the Confederação Brasileira de Futebol had decided to postpone their tournaments indefinitely, the Federação Paulista de Futebol also decided to suspend the Campeonato Paulista for the time being.

It was announced on 26 March that the clubs decided to grant 20 days of vacation from 1 April until 20 April for their players. That period was extended for another 10 days on April 15. Corinthians announced on 30 April that 25% of the players' salary and 70% of the staff's salary would be reduced amid the pandemic. On 23 June, the club made a return to non-contact training, with social distancing rules still in place, while a full-return only began on 1 July. During return tests, 24 players tested positive (13 of them already recovered) and 34 people from the staff as well (with 29 of them recovered).

On 8 July, it was announced that the Campeonato Paulista would return on 22 July, while the 2020 Campeonato Brasileiro Série A would begin on 8 August. The season is now expected to end on 24 February 2021.

=== Arena Corinthians' naming rights ===
On 1 September (Corinthians' 110th anniversary), a special event live from the stadium was held to announce the Arena's new name. It was officially renamed Neo Química Arena, part of a 20-year partnership with Hypera Pharma, Brazil's largest pharmaceutical company. Neo Química is Hypera's generic drugs division, which already served as Corinthians' main sponsor during the 2010 and 2011 seasons. The full contract is expected to be around R$300–320 million.

=== Presidential election ===
On 28 November, the election to decide Corinthians' new president for the 2021–2023 term was held featuring only associates of the social club, meaning that less than three thousand people would decide the winner. Duílio Monteiro Alves (who was Sanchez's football director until September) defeated former president Mário Gobbi Filho and August Melo with only 1081 votes (38 percent of the total).

Duílio assumed office on 4 January 2021, bringing back former president Roberto de Andrade as the new football director and Alessandro Nunes (captain of the 2012 Copa Libertadores and 2012 FIFA Club World Cup titles) as football manager.

=== Sponsorship ===
On January 23, 2021, Corinthians announced that Banco BMG would not remain as the main sponsor, but rather move to a different spot in the uniform. Two days later, it was announced that Neo Química will be the new main sponsor for the next five seasons.

== Squad ==
As of 25 February 2021

Note: Flags indicate national team as defined under FIFA eligibility rules; some limited exceptions apply. Players may hold more than one non-FIFA nationality.

No.	Pos.	Nation	Player
2	DF	BRA	Michel Macedo
3	DF	BRA	Jemerson
4	DF	BRA	Gil
5	MF	BRA	Gabriel
6	DF	BRA	Lucas Piton
7	FW	BRA	Luan
8	MF	BRA	Ramiro
10	MF	ECU	Juan Cazares
11	MF	VEN	Rómulo Otero (on loan from Atlético Mineiro)
12	GK	BRA	Cássio (captain)
13	DF	BRA	Léo Santos
14	DF	URU	Bruno Méndez
15	MF	BRA	Éderson
17	FW	BRA	Cauê
18	FW	BRA	Léo Natel
19	FW	BRA	Gustavo Silva
20	MF	BRA	Camacho
21	MF	CHI	Ángelo Araos
22	MF	BRA	Mateus Vital

No.	Pos.	Nation	Player
23	DF	BRA	Fagner
24	MF	COL	Víctor Cantillo (on loan from Atlético Junior)
25	DF	BRA	Marllon
26	DF	BRA	Fábio Santos
27	GK	BRA	Walter
28	FW	BRA	Jonathan Cafú
29	MF	BRA	Roni
31	MF	BRA	Gustavo Mantuan
32	GK	BRA	Matheus Donelli
33	FW	BRA	Matheus Davó
34	DF	BRA	Raul Gustavo
35	DF	BRA	Danilo Avelar
36	MF	BRA	Ruan (on loan from Metropolitano)
37	FW	BRA	Everaldo
38	MF	BRA	Gabriel Pereira
39	MF	BRA	Xavier
40	GK	BRA	Guilherme Castellani
77	FW	BRA	Jô

== Managerial changes ==
On September 11, 2020, Tiago Nunes was fired after losing a home match a day earlier to Palmeiras. Despite being hired on November 7, 2019, he only took charge at the beginning of this season. The club announced that Dyego Coelho, former player and current U20 manager, would take over as caretaker.

On October 12, 2020, Coelho was removed from his interim position and Corinthians announced Vágner Mancini, who was then-Atlético Goianiense manager, as their new head coach.

Manager	Signed from	Date of signing	Date of departure	Signed with	Source
(Brazil) Tiago Nunes	(Brazil) Athletico Paranaense	7 November 2019	11 September 2020	—	
(Brazil) Dyego Coelho	Corinthians U20 head coach (interim)	11 September 2020	11 October 2020	—	
(Brazil) Vágner Mancini	(Brazil) Atlético Goianiense	12 October 2020	—	—	

== Transfers ==
=== Transfers in ===
#	Position:	Player	Transferred from	Fee	Date	Team	Source
7	FW	(Brazil) Luan	(Brazil) Grêmio	€5,000,000 (~R$22,000,000)	14 December 2019	First team	
18	MF	(Brazil) Matheus Jesus	(Portugal) Estoril	Undisclosed (Note: Matheus Jesus was already on loan with an obligation to buy from May 2019 until December 2019.)	1 January 2020	First team	
33	FW	(Brazil) Matheus Davó	(Brazil) Guarani	Undisclosed	12 January 2020	First team	
15	MF	(Brazil) Éderson	(Brazil) Cruzeiro	Free transfer (Rescinded contract)	21 February 2020	First team	
77	FW	(Brazil) Jô	(Japan) Nagoya Grampus	Free transfer (Rescinded contract)	17 June 2020	First team	
18	FW	(Brazil) Léo Natel	(Brazil) São Paulo	Free transfer (End of contract)	16 July 2020	First team	
10	MF	(Ecuador) Juan Cazares	(Brazil) Atlético Mineiro	Free transfer (Rescinded contract)	26 September 2020	First team	
	DF	(Brazil) Reginaldo	(Brazil) ABC	Undisclosed	2 October 2020	Academy	
26	DF	(Brazil) Fábio Santos	(Brazil) Atlético Mineiro	Free transfer (Rescinded contract)	19 October 2020	First team	
	FW	(Brazil) Diogo Vitor	Free agent	Free transfer	29 October 2020	Under-23s	
3	DF	(Brazil) Jemerson	(France) Monaco	Undisclosed (~R$4,500,000)	5 November 2020	First team	
28	FW	(Brazil) Jonathan Cafú	(France) Bordeaux	Free transfer (Rescinded contract)	9 November 2020	First team	

=== Loans in ===
#	Position	Player	Loaned from	Date	Loan expires	Team	Source
	FW	(Paraguay) Jorge Colmán	(Paraguay) Olimpia	4 January 2020	31 December 2020	Under-23s	
16	DF	(Brazil) Sidcley	(Ukraine) Dynamo Kyiv	8 January 2020	31 December 2020	First team	
24	MF	(Colombia) Víctor Cantillo	(Colombia) Atlético Junior	9 January 2020	30 June 2021 (Note: Loan with an obligation to buy.)	First team	
11	FW	(Colombia) Yony González	(Portugal) Benfica	11 February 2020	31 August 2020 (Note: Loan with an obligation to buy after a pre-established number of games.) (Cancelled on 14 July 2020)	First team	
11	MF	(Venezuela) Rómulo Otero	(Brazil) Atlético Mineiro	24 August 2020	30 June 2021	First team	

=== Transfers out ===
#	Position	Player	Transferred to	Fee	Date	Team	Source
	DF	(Brazil) Vinicius Del'Amore	(Brazil) Votuporanguense	Free transfer (Rescinded contract)	19 November 2019	First team	
	DF	(Brazil) Léo Príncipe	(Brazil) CRB	Free transfer (End of contract)	12 December 2019	First team	
11	MF	(Brazil) Júnior Urso	(United States) Orlando City	Undisclosed (~R$3,500,000)	26 December 2019	First team	
	MF	(Brazil) Paulo Roberto	(Brazil) Mirassol	Free transfer (End of contract)	1 January 2020	First team	
	FW	(Brazil) Gabriel Vasconcelos	(Canada) York9	Free transfer (End of contract)	1 January 2020	First team	
	MF	(Brazil) Giovanni Augusto	(Brazil) Coritiba	Free transfer (End of contract)	1 January 2020	First team	
	MF	(Brazil) Marlone	(South Korea) Suwon FC	Free transfer (End of contract)	1 January 2020	First team	
	MF	(Brazil) Fellipe Bastos	(Brazil) Vasco da Gama	Free transfer (End of contract)	1 January 2020	First team	
	MF	(Brazil) Guilherme	Free agent	End of contract	1 January 2020	First team	
	MF	(Brazil) Rodrigo Figueiredo	Free agent	End of contract	1 January 2020	First team	
25	FW	(Brazil) Clayson	(Brazil) Bahia	R$4,000,000	6 January 2020	First team	
	MF	(Brazil) Ralf	Free agent	Rescinded contract	22 January 2020	First team	
	MF	(Brazil) Jádson	Free agent	Rescinded contract	28 February 2020	First team	
10	MF	(Brazil) Pedrinho	(Portugal) Benfica	€18,000,000 (~R$118,000,000) (Note: Deal was originally set in €20,000,000. However in August 19, it was announced that Corinthians and Benfica reached a new deal due to Yony González's loan cancellation. The new price was set in €18,000,000.)	11 March 2020 (Note: Deal originally would be effective after Corinthians' participation in the 2020 Campeonato Paulista ended. Pedrinho was officially presented in August.)	First team	
	DF	(Brazil) Rael	(Brazil) Oeste	Free transfer (End of contract)	1 April 2020	Academy	
	DF	(Brazil) Guilherme Romão	(Brazil) Botafogo (SP)	End of contract	18 April 2020	First team	
9	FW	(Brazil) Vágner Love	(Kazakhstan) Kairat	Free transfer (Rescinded contract)	5 June 2020	First team	
	FW	(Brazil) André Luis	(South Korea) Daejeon Hana Citizen	U$2,200,000 (~R$11,100,000)	12 June 2020	First team	
	FW	(Brazil) Lucca	(Qatar) Al-Khor	Free transfer (Rescinded contract)	2 July 2020	First team	
34	DF	(Brazil) Pedro Henrique	(Brazil) Athletico Paranaense	€1,000,000 (~R$6,100,000)	20 July 2020	First team	
	FW	(Brazil) Gustavo	(South Korea) Jeonbuk Hyundai Motors	U$2,500,000 (~R$13,700,000)	22 July 2020	First team	
30	DF	(Brazil) Carlos Augusto	(Italy) Monza	€4,000,000 (~R$25,700,000)	28 August 2020	First team	
	MF	(Brazil) Guilherme Mantuan	(Portugal) Gil Vicente	Free transfer (Rescinded contract)	8 September 2020	First team	
	MF	(Brazil) Jean	(Portugal) Marítimo	Free transfer (Rescinded contract)	22 September 2020	First team	
	FW	(Brazil) Maxwell	(Brazil) Sport Recife	Free transfer (Rescinded contract)	3 December 2020	Under-23s	
17	FW	(Argentina) Mauro Boselli	(Paraguay) Cerro Porteño	Free transfer (End of contract)	24 December 2020	First team	
	MW	(Brazil) Renê Júnior	Free agent	Free transfer (End of contract)	1 January 2021	First team	
	FW	(Brazil) Carlinhos	Free agent	Free transfer (End of contract)	1 January 2021	First team	
	MF	(Brazil) Marciel	Free agent	Free transfer (End of contract)	1 January 2021	First team	
	FW	(Brazil) Luidy	(Brazil) CRB	Free transfer (End of contract)	1 January 2021	First team	
	FW	(Brazil) Diogo Vitor	Free agent	Free transfer (Rescinded contract)	26 January 2021	Under-23s	

=== Loans out ===
#	Position	Player	Loaned to	Date	Loan expires	Team	Source
	DF	(Brazil) João Victor	(Brazil) Inter de Limeira	18 November 2019	30 April 2020	Academy	
	MF	(Brazil) Rafael Bilú	(Brazil) CSA	13 December 2019	31 January 2021	First team	
	MF	(Brazil) Fessin	(Brazil) Bahia	16 December 2019	28 February 2021	Academy	
	DF	(Brazil) Guilherme Romão	(Brazil) Botafogo (SP)	17 December 2019	18 April 2020	First team	
1	GK	(Brazil) Caíque França	(Brazil) Oeste	17 December 2019	31 January 2021	First team	
	MF	(Brazil) Rafinha	(Brazil) Penapolense	17 December 2019	30 April 2020	Academy	
	FW	(Brazil) Carlinhos	(Brazil) Marcílio Dias	18 December 2019	30 April 2020	First team	
	DF	(Brazil) Matheus Alexandre	(Brazil) Ponte Preta	19 December 2019	31 December 2020	First team	
	DF	(Brazil) Rael	(Brazil) Oeste	20 December 2019	1 April 2020	Academy	
	MF	(Brazil) Marciel	(Brazil) Juventude	26 December 2019	31 December 2020	First team	
	MF	(Brazil) Thiaguinho	(Brazil) Botafogo	27 December 2019	31 December 2020 (Cancelled on 4 March 2020)	First team	
	FW	(Brazil) Lucca	(Qatar) Al-Khor	29 December 2019	31 July 2020 (Rescinded contract on 2 July 2020)	First team	
	MF	(Brazil) Marquinhos	(Brazil) Sport Recife	1 January 2020	28 February 2021	First team	
18	MF	(Brazil) Matheus Jesus	(Brazil) Red Bull Bragantino	3 January 2020	28 February 2021 (Note: Loan with an obligation to buy after a pre-established number of games (30).)	First team	
	DF	(Brazil) Igor Formiga	(Brazil) Coimbra	3 January 2020	30 April 2020	Academy	
	MF	(Brazil) Guilherme Mantuan	(Brazil) Oeste	6 January 2020	31 December 2020 (Cancelled on 25 August 2020)	First team	
	MF	(Brazil) Fabrício Oya	(Brazil) Oeste	6 January 2020	31 December 2020	First team	
	FW	(Brazil) Gustavo Silva	(Brazil) Paraná	6 January 2020	31 December 2020 (Cancelled on 13 August 2020)	First team	
	FW	(Brazil) Luidy	(Brazil) CRB	6 January 2020	31 December 2020	First team	
	FW	(Brazil) Matheus Matias	(Brazil) Oeste	6 January 2020	31 December 2020 (Cancelled on 23 July 2020)	First team	
7	MF	(Ecuador) Junior Sornoza	(Ecuador) LDU Quito	6 January 2020	31 December 2020	First team	
	DF	(Brazil) Caetano	(Brazil) Coritiba	7 January 2020	31 December 2020 (Cancelled on 16 July 2020)	First team	
8	MF	(Brazil) Renê Júnior	(Brazil) Coritiba	8 January 2020	31 December 2020 (Cancelled on 26 August 2020)	First team	
	FW	(Brazil) André Luis	(South Korea) Daejeon Hana Citizen	19 January 2020	31 December 2020 (Signed definitely on 12 June 2020)	First team	
	MF	(Brazil) Jean	(Brazil) Vitória	22 January 2020	31 December 2020 (Cancelled on 16 September 2020)	First team	
19	FW	(Brazil) Gustavo	(Brazil) Internacional	18 February 2020	31 December 2020 (Cancelled on 30 June 2020)	First team	
29	FW	(Brazil) Madson	(Brazil) Fortaleza	19 February 2020	31 December 2020 (Cancelled on 31 August 2020)	First team	
40	GK	(Brazil) Filipe	(Brazil) Paraná	20 February 2020	31 January 2021	First team	
	FW	(Brazil) Hugo Borges	(Bolivia) Jorge Wilstermann	1 March 2020	30 June 2020	Under-23s	
13	DF	(Brazil) Marllon	(Brazil) Cruzeiro	6 March 2020	31 December 2020 (Cancelled on 8 October 2020)	First team	
	MF	(Brazil) Thiaguinho	(Brazil) CRB	17 March 2020	20 November 2020	First team	
	DF	(Brazil) João Victor	(Brazil) Atlético Goianiense	27 June 2020	28 February 2021	Academy	
	DF	(Brazil) Raul Gustavo	(Brazil) Inter de Limeira	8 July 2020	31 December 2020 (Cancelled on 7 September 2020)	Academy	
	FW	(Brazil) Carlinhos	(Brazil) Atibaia	9 July 2020	31 December 2020	First team	
	DF	(Brazil) Caetano	(Brazil) Oeste	16 July 2020	31 January 2021	First team	
25	MF	(Brazil) Richard	(Brazil) Athletico Paranaense	20 July 2020	31 December 2021	First team	
	MF	(Brazil) Rafinha	(Brazil) Oeste	22 July 2020	31 December 2020 (Cancelled on 6 October 2020)	Academy	
	FW	(Brazil) Matheus Matias	(Brazil) São Bernardo	23 July 2020	23 October 2020	First team	
	FW	(Brazil) Nathan	(Spain) Racing de Ferrol	10 August 2020	30 June 2021	Under-23s	
31	MF	(Brazil) Janderson	(Brazil) Atlético Goianiense	19 August 2020	28 February 2021	First team	
	FW	(Brazil) Madson	(Brazil) Oeste	8 September 2020	31 January 2021	First team	
	FW	(Brazil) Matheus Matias	(Brazil) Paraná	23 October 2020	31 January 2021	First team	
	MF	(Ecuador) Junior Sornoza	(Mexico) Tijuana	5 January 2021	31 December 2021	First team	

== Squad statistics ==
No.	Pos.	Name	Campeonato Paulista		Copa Libertadores		Campeonato Brasileiro		Copa do Brasil		Total		Discipline	
No.	Pos.	Name	Apps	Goals	Apps	Goals	Apps	Goals	Apps	Goals	Apps	Goals	Yellow card	Red card
2	DF	(Brazil) Michel Macedo	1 (2)	0	0	0	5 (2)	0	0	0	6 (4)	0	1	0
3	DF	(Brazil) Jemerson	0	0	0	0	7	0	0	0	7	0	0	0
4	DF	(Brazil) Gil	15	2	2	0	36	2	2	0	55	4	7	0
5	MF	(Brazil) Gabriel	9 (2)	0	0	0	24 (4)	2	0 (1)	0	33 (7)	2	9	1
6	DF	(Brazil) Lucas Piton	6 (2)	0	0 (2)	0	15 (5)	0	2	0	23 (9)	0	2	0
7	FW	(Brazil) Luan	15 (1)	2	2	1	11 (11)	2	0 (2)	0	28 (14)	5	3	0
8	MF	(Brazil) Ramiro	9	1	0	0	20 (11)	1	2	0	31 (11)	2	10	0
9	FW	(Brazil) Vágner Love	3 (3)	1	1	0	0	0	0	0	4 (3)	1	1	0
10	MF	(Brazil) Pedrinho	1 (2)	0	1	0	0	0	0	0	2 (2)	0	2	1
10	MF	(Ecuador) Juan Cazares	0	0	0	0	10 (10)	2	2	0	12 (10)	2	1	0
11	FW	(Colombia) Yony González	4	0	0	0	0	0	0	0	4	0	1	0
11	MF	(Venezuela) Rómulo Otero	0	0	0	0	18 (6)	2	0	0	18 (6)	2	8	1
12	GK	(Brazil) Cássio	15	0	2	0	35	0	2	0	54	0	4	1
13	DF	(Brazil) Léo Santos	0	0	0	0	0	0	0	0	0	0	0	0
14	DF	(Uruguay) Bruno Méndez	1 (1)	0	0	0	14 (2)	0	0	0	15 (3)	0	4	1
15	MF	(Brazil) Éderson	4 (3)	3	0	0	8 (8)	0	2	0	14 (11)	3	1	0
16	DF	(Brazil) Sidcley	2 (5)	0	2	0	5 (4)	0	0 (1)	0	9 (10)	0	0	0
17	FW	(Argentina) Mauro Boselli	10 (1)	5	2	1	1 (7)	0	0 (1)	0	13 (9)	6	0	0
17	FW	(Brazil) Cauê	0	0	0	0	0	0	0	0	0	0	0	0
18	FW	(Brazil) Léo Natel	0 (2)	0	0	0	14 (17)	4	0 (2)	0	14 (21)	4	3	0
19	FW	(Brazil) Gustavo	1 (1)	0	0 (1)	0	0	0	0	0	1 (2)	0	0	0
19	FW	(Brazil) Gustavo Silva	0	0	0	0	16 (11)	5	0	0	16 (11)	5	1	0
20	MF	(Brazil) Camacho	9 (1)	0	2	0	4 (16)	0	0	0	15 (17)	0	8	1
21	MF	(Chile) Ángelo Araos	0 (6)	0	0	0	12 (3)	1	0	0	12 (9)	1	3	0
22	MF	(Brazil) Mateus Vital	5 (6)	0	0 (1)	0	14 (11)	4	2	0	21 (18)	4	5	0
23	DF	(Brazil) Fagner	15 (1)	0	2	0	32	2	2	1	51 (1)	3	10	1
24	MF	(Colombia) Víctor Cantillo	7 (3)	0	2	0	21 (4)	0	0 (2)	0	30 (9)	0	9	0
25	MF	(Brazil) Richard	3	0	0	0	0	0	0	0	3	0	1	0
25	DF	(Brazil) Marllon	0	0	0	0	7 (4)	0	2	0	9 (4)	0	1	1
26	DF	(Brazil) Fábio Santos	0	0	0	0	20	3	0	0	20	3	3	0
27	GK	(Brazil) Walter	1	0	0	0	3 (1)	0	0	0	4 (1)	0	2	0
28	FW	(Brazil) Jonathan Cafú	0	0	0	0	1 (2)	0	0	0	1 (2)	0	0	0
29	FW	(Brazil) Madson	1 (1)	0	0 (1)	0	0	0	0	0	1 (2)	0	0	0
29	MF	(Brazil) Roni	0	0	0	0	7 (2)	1	0	0	7 (2)	1	4	0
30	DF	(Brazil) Carlos Augusto	8	0	0	0	0	0	0	0	8	0	1	0
31	MF	(Brazil) Janderson	5 (5)	1	1 (1)	0	0 (1)	0	0	0	6 (7)	1	2	1
31	MF	(Brazil) Gustavo Mantuan	0	0	0	0	3 (4)	1	0	0	3 (4)	1	0	0
32	GK	(Brazil) Matheus Donelli	0	0	0	0	0	0	0	0	0	0	0	0
33	FW	(Brazil) Matheus Davó	0 (2)	0	0	0	4	2	1	0	5 (2)	2	1	0
34	DF	(Brazil) Pedro Henrique	10	0	2	0	0	0	0	0	12	0	0	0
34	DF	(Brazil) Raul Gustavo	0	0	0	0	0 (1)	0	0	0	0 (1)	0	0	0
35	DF	(Brazil) Danilo Avelar	6	1	0	0	13	2	0	0	19	3	7	1
36	MF	(Brazil) Ruan	0	0	0	0	1 (3)	0	0	0	1 (3)	0	0	0
37	FW	(Brazil) Everaldo	6 (5)	1	1	0	4 (9)	2	1 (1)	0	12 (15)	3	5	0
38	MF	(Brazil) Gabriel Pereira	0	0	0	0	0 (10)	0	0	0	0 (10)	0	2	0
39	MF	(Brazil) Xavier	0	0	0	0	9 (9)	0	2	0	11 (9)	0	5	0
40	GK	(Brazil) Guilherme Castellani	0	0	0	0	0	0	0	0	0	0	0	0
77	FW	(Brazil) Jô	4	2	0	0	24 (6)	6	0	0	28 (6)	8	2	1

== Overview ==
Competition	First match	Last match	Starting round	Final position	Record							
Competition	First match	Last match	Starting round	Final position	Pld	W	D	L	GF	GA	GD	Win %
Série A	12 August 2020	25 February 2021	Matchday 1	12th	38	13	12	13	45	45	+0	34.21
Copa do Brasil	28 October 2020	4 November 2020	Round of 16	Round of 16	2	0	1	1	1	2	−1	0.00
Campeonato Paulista	23 January 2020	8 August 2020	Matchday 1	Runners-up	16	6	7	3	19	11	+8	37.50
Copa Libertadores	5 February 2020	12 February 2020	Second stage	Second stage	2	1	0	1	2	2	+0	50.00
Total					58	20	20	18	67	60	+7	34.48

Source: Competitions

== Pre-season and friendlies ==
=== Florida Cup ===
15 January 2020 Florida Cup	Corinthians (Brazil)	2–1	(United States) New York City FC	Orlando, United States
18:00 UTC−5	Luan 10', 29'	Report	Méndez 74' (o.g.)	Stadium: Exploria Stadium; Referee: JJ Bilinski

18 January 2020 Florida Cup	Atlético Nacional (Colombia)	2–1	(Brazil) Corinthians	Orlando, United States
17:30 UTC−5	Torres 43'; Gómez 82'	Report	Ramiro 6'	Stadium: Exploria Stadium; Referee: Matthew Miscannon

== Campeonato Paulista ==
For the 2020 Campeonato Paulista, the 16 teams were divided in four groups of 4 teams (A, B, C, D). They faced all teams, except those that are in their own group, with the top two teams from each group qualifying for the quarterfinals. The two overall worst teams were relegated. The tournament returned to a previous format in which the quarter-finals and semi-finals were held in one-match playoffs.

Group D
Pos	Team	Pld	W	D	L	GF	GA	GD	Pts	Qualification or relegation
1	Red Bull Bragantino	12	7	2	3	18	9	+9	23	Knockout stage
2	Corinthians	12	4	5	3	15	10	+5	17	Knockout stage
3	Guarani	12	4	4	4	16	14	+2	16	
4	Ferroviária	12	3	6	3	13	9	+4	15	

Source: Soccerway

=== First stage ===
23 January 2020 1	Corinthians	4–1	Botafogo	São Paulo
21:30 UTC−3	Boselli 11', 59', 83'; Luan 54' (pen.)	Report	Ronald 81'	Stadium: Arena Corinthians; Attendance: 24,804; Referee: Luiz Flávio de Oliveira

26 January 2020 2	Mirassol	1–1	Corinthians	Mirassol
19:00 UTC−3	Camilo 74'	Report	Ramiro 11'	Stadium: Estádio Municipal José Maria de Campos Maia; Attendance: 11,951; Referee: Vinícius Gonçalves Dias Araújo

30 January 2020 3	Ponte Preta	2–1	Corinthians	Campinas
21:30 UTC−3	Bruno Reis 39'; Roger 40'	Report	Boselli 51'	Stadium: Estádio Moisés Lucarelli; Attendance: 4,338; Referee: Thiago Duarte Peixoto

2 February 2020 4	Corinthians	2–0	Santos	São Paulo
11:00 UTC−3	Everaldo 1'; Janderson 46'	Report		Stadium: Arena Corinthians; Attendance: 40,935; Referee: Luiz Flávio de Oliveira

9 February 2020 5	Corinthians	0–1	Inter de Limeira	São Paulo
16:00 UTC−3		Report	Tcharlles 41'	Stadium: Arena Corinthians; Attendance: 27,995; Referee: Raphael Claus

15 February 2020 6	São Paulo	0–0	Corinthians	São Paulo
19:00 UTC−3		Report		Stadium: Estádio do Morumbi; Attendance: 44,208; Referee: Douglas Marques das Flores

22 February 2020 7	Água Santa	2–1	Corinthians	Diadema
15:00 UTC−3	Luan Dias 31'; Robinho 90'	Report	Vágner Love 7'	Stadium: Arena Inamar; Attendance: 3,058; Referee: Flávio Rodrigues de Souza

26 February 2020 8	Corinthians	1–1	Santo André	São Paulo
21:30 UTC−3	Boselli 90+1'	Report	Ronaldo 27'	Stadium: Arena Corinthians; Attendance: 17,401; Referee: Salim Fende Chavez
Note: This match was originally expected to take place on 29 February, but was anticipated due to broadcast requests.

7 March 2020 9	Novorizontino	1–1	Corinthians	Novo Horizonte
19:00 UTC−3	Jenison 23'	Report	Gil 19'	Stadium: Estádio Dr. Jorge Ismael de Biasi; Attendance: 6,706; Referee: Vinícius Gonçalves Dias Araújo

15 March 2020 10	Corinthians	1–1	Ituano	São Paulo
16:00 UTC−3	Luan 45+1'	Report	Breno Lopes 14'	Stadium: Arena Corinthians; Attendance: 0 Referee: Flávio Rodrigues de Souza
Note: Corinthians played this match behind closed doors due to a pandemic of COVID-19 in Brazil.

22 July 2020 11	Corinthians	1–0	Palmeiras	São Paulo
21:30 UTC−3	Gil 14'	Report		Stadium: Arena Corinthians; Attendance: 0 Referee: Raphael Claus
Note: The match was originally scheduled for 22 March, but it was indefinitely postponed on 16 March due to the COVID-19 pandemic in Brazil. It was played behind closed doors.

26 July 2020 12	Oeste	0–2	Corinthians	Barueri
16:00 UTC−3		Report	Avelar 45+2'; Éderson 90'	Stadium: Arena Barueri; Attendance: 0 Referee: Luiz Flávio de Oliveira
Note: The match was originally scheduled for 1 April, but it was indefinitely postponed on 16 March due to the COVID-19 pandemic in Brazil. It was played behind closed doors.

=== Knockout stages ===
30 July 2020 Quarter-finals	Red Bull Bragantino	0–2	Corinthians	São Paulo
19:00 UTC−3		Report	Éderson 1'; Jô 64'	Stadium: Estádio do Morumbi (Note: Red Bull Bragantino played their home match at Estádio do Morumbi, São Paulo instead of their regular stadium Estádio Nabi Abi Chedid, Bragança Paulista due to restrictions related to the COVID-19 pandemic in Brazil.); Attendance: 0 Referee: Raphael Claus
Note: It was played behind closed doors due to the COVID-19 pandemic in Brazil.

2 August 2020 Semi-finals	Corinthians	1–0	Mirassol	São Paulo
16:00 UTC−3	Éderson 71'	Report		Stadium: Arena Corinthians; Attendance: 0 Referee: Vinícius Gonçalves Dias Araújo
Note: It was played behind closed doors due to the COVID-19 pandemic in Brazil.

5 August 2020 Finals	Corinthians	0–0	Palmeiras	São Paulo
21:30 UTC−3		Report		Stadium: Arena Corinthians; Attendance: 0 Referee: Raphael Claus
Note: It was played behind closed doors due to the COVID-19 pandemic in Brazil.

8 August 2020 Finals	Palmeiras	1–1 (1–1 agg.) (4–3 p)	Corinthians	São Paulo
16:30 UTC−3	Luiz Adriano 48'	Report	Jô 90+6' (pen.)	Stadium: Allianz Parque; Attendance: 0 Referee: Luiz Flávio de Oliveira
	Penalties
	Bruno Henrique (penalty missed); Raphael Veiga (penalty scored); Gustavo Scarpa (penalty scored); Lucas Lima (penalty scored); Patrick de Paula (penalty scored)		(penalty missed) Michel Macedo; (penalty scored) Avelar; (penalty missed) Cantillo; (penalty scored) Sidcley; (penalty scored) Jô
Note: It was played behind closed doors due to the COVID-19 pandemic in Brazil.

== Copa Libertadores ==
=== Qualifying stages ===
5 February 2020 Second stage	Guaraní (Paraguay)	1–0	(Brazil) Corinthians	Asunción, Paraguay
21:30 UTC−3	Morel 7'	Report		Stadium: Estadio General Pablo Rojas (Note: Guaraní played their home match at Estadio General Pablo Rojas, Asunción instead of their regular stadium Estadio Rogelio Livieres, Asunción as it did not meet CONMEBOL requirements.); Referee: Alexis Herrera (Venezuela)

12 February 2020 Second stage	Corinthians (Brazil)	2–1 (2–2a agg.)	(Paraguay) Guaraní	São Paulo, Brazil
21:30 UTC−3	Luan 9'; Boselli 32'	Report	F. Fernández 53'	Stadium: Arena Corinthians; Attendance: 40,598; Referee: Néstor Pitana (Argentina)

== Campeonato Brasileiro ==
Pos	Team	Pld	W	D	L	GF	GA	GD	Pts	Qualification or relegation
10	Red Bull Bragantino	38	13	14	11	50	40	+10	53	Qualification for Copa Sudamericana group stage
11	Ceará	38	14	10	14	54	51	+3	52	Qualification for Copa Sudamericana group stage
12	Corinthians	38	13	12	13	45	45	0	51	Qualification for Copa Sudamericana group stage
13	Atlético Goianiense	38	12	14	12	40	45	−5	50	Qualification for Copa Sudamericana group stage
14	Bahia	38	12	8	18	48	59	−11	44	Qualification for Copa Sudamericana group stage

Source: CBF
Rules for classification: 1) points; 2) wins; 3) goal difference; 4) goals scored; 5) head-to-head results (only between 2 teams); 6) fewest red cards; 7) fewest yellow cards; 8) draw.

=== Results ===
12 August 2020 2	Atlético Mineiro	3–2	Corinthians	Belo Horizonte
19:15 UTC−3	Hyoran 51', 55'; Nathan 60'	Report	Jô 11'; Araos 29'	Stadium: Mineirão; Attendance: 0 Referee: Wagner Nascimento de Magalhães
Note: It was played behind closed doors due to the COVID-19 pandemic in Brazil.

15 August 2020 3	Grêmio	0–0	Corinthians	Porto Alegre
19:00 UTC−3		Report		Stadium: Arena do Grêmio; Attendance: 0 Referee: Bruno Arleu de Araújo
Note: It was played behind closed doors due to the COVID-19 pandemic in Brazil.

19 August 2020 4	Corinthians	3–1	Coritiba	São Paulo
21:30 UTC−3	Léo Natel 37'; Jô 48'; Gustavo Silva 86'	Report	Sassá 42'	Stadium: Arena Corinthians; Attendance: 0 Referee: Bráulio da Silva Machado
Note: It was played behind closed doors due to the COVID-19 pandemic in Brazil.

26 August 2020 5	Corinthians	1–1	Fortaleza	São Paulo
21:30 UTC−3	Luan 75'	Report	Romarinho 61'	Stadium: Arena Corinthians; Attendance: 0 Referee: Rodolpho Toski
Note: This match was originally expected to take place on 22 August, but was rescheduled due to broadcast requests. It was played behind closed doors due to the COVID-19 pandemic in Brazil.

30 August 2020 6	São Paulo	2–1	Corinthians	São Paulo
11:00 UTC−3	Hernanes 13'; Brenner 90+1'	Report	Ramiro 35'	Stadium: Estádio do Morumbi; Attendance: 0 Referee: Flávio Rodrigues de Souza
Note: It was played behind closed doors due to the COVID-19 pandemic in Brazil.

2 September 2020 7	Goiás	1–2	Corinthians	Goiânia
19:15 UTC−3	Vinícius Lopes 64'	Report	Fábio Sanches 27' (o.g.); Avelar 90'	Stadium: Estádio da Serrinha; Attendance: 0 Referee: José Mendonça da Silva Júnior
Note: It was played behind closed doors due to the COVID-19 pandemic in Brazil.

5 September 2020 8	Corinthians	2–2	Botafogo	São Paulo
19:00 UTC−3	Fagner 11' (pen.); Jô 90+2'	Report	Bruno Nazário 21'; Kalou 74'	Stadium: Neo Química Arena; Attendance: 0 Referee: Rafael Traci
Note: It was played behind closed doors due to the COVID-19 pandemic in Brazil.

10 September 2020 9	Corinthians	0–2	Palmeiras	São Paulo
19:15 UTC−3		Report	Luiz Adriano 42' (pen.); Gabriel Veron 64'	Stadium: Neo Química Arena; Attendance: 0 Referee: Leandro Vuaden
Note: It was played behind closed doors due to the COVID-19 pandemic in Brazil.

13 September 2020 10	Fluminense	2–1	Corinthians	Rio de Janeiro
16:00 UTC−3	Nenê 7', 88' (pen.)	Report	Mateus Vital 90+4'	Stadium: Maracanã; Attendance: 0 Referee: Bráulio da Silva Machado
Note: It was played behind closed doors due to the COVID-19 pandemic in Brazil.

16 September 2020 11	Corinthians	3–2	Bahia	São Paulo
21:30 UTC−3	Otero 16'; Roni 33'; Gil 60'		Nino Paraíba 35'; Saldanha 88'	Stadium: Neo Química Arena; Attendance: 0 Referee: Wagner Nascimento de Magalhães
Note: It was played behind closed doors due to the COVID-19 pandemic in Brazil.

23 September 2020 12	Sport Recife	1–0	Corinthians	Recife
21:30 UTC−3	Iago Maidana 36' (pen.)	Report		Stadium: Ilha do Retiro; Attendance: 0 Referee: Wilton Sampaio
Note: It was played behind closed doors due to the COVID-19 pandemic in Brazil.

30 September 2020 1	Corinthians	0−0	Atlético Goianiense	São Paulo
21:30 UTC−3		Report		Stadium: Neo Química Arena; Attendance: 0 Referee: Paulo Roberto Alves Júnior
Note: This match was originally scheduled for 9 August, but it was postponed due to the second leg of the 2020 Campeonato Paulista Finals being played the day before. It was played behind closed doors due to the COVID-19 pandemic in Brazil.

3 October 2020 13	Red Bull Bragantino	0−0	Corinthians	Bragança Paulista
21:00 UTC−3		Report		Stadium: Estádio Nabi Abi Chedid; Attendance: 0 Referee: Edina Alves Batista
Note: It was played behind closed doors due to the COVID-19 pandemic in Brazil.

7 October 2020 14	Corinthians	1−1	Santos	São Paulo
19:00 UTC−3	Avelar 45'	Report	Madson 10'	Stadium: Neo Química Arena; Attendance: 0 Referee: Marcelo de Lima Henrique
Note: It was played behind closed doors due to the COVID-19 pandemic in Brazil.

11 October 2020 15	Ceará	2−1	Corinthians	Fortaleza
20:30 UTC−3	Gil 33' (o.g.); Fernando Sobral 90' (pen.)	Report	Léo Natel 14'	Stadium: Arena Castelão; Attendance: 0 Referee: Anderson Daronco
Note: It was played behind closed doors due to the COVID-19 pandemic in Brazil.

14 October 2020 16	Athletico Paranaense	0−1	Corinthians	Curitiba
21:30 UTC−3		Report	Everaldo 90+4'	Stadium: Arena da Baixada; Attendance: 0 Referee: Savio Pereira Sampaio
Note: It was played behind closed doors due to the COVID-19 pandemic in Brazil.

18 October 2020 17	Corinthians	1−5	Flamengo	São Paulo
16:00 UTC−3	Gil 63'	Report	Éverton Ribeiro 31'; Vitinho 51'; Natan 57'; Bruno Henrique 71'; Diego 85'	Stadium: Neo Química Arena; Attendance: 0 Referee: Leandro Vuaden
Note: It was played behind closed doors due to the COVID-19 pandemic in Brazil.

21 October 2020 18	Vasco da Gama	1−2	Corinthians	Rio de Janeiro
21:30 UTC−3	Ribamar 71'	Report	Mantuan 22'; Everaldo 89'	Stadium: Estádio São Januário; Attendance: 0 Referee: Caio Max Augusto Vieira
Note: It was played behind closed doors due to the COVID-19 pandemic in Brazil.

31 October 2020 19	Corinthians	1−0	Internacional	São Paulo
19:00 UTC−3	Davó 32'	Report		Stadium: Neo Química Arena; Attendance: 0 Referee: Paulo Roberto Alves Júnior
Note: It was played behind closed doors due to the COVID-19 pandemic in Brazil.

7 November 2020 20	Atlético Goianiense	1−1	Corinthians	Goiânia
21:00 UTC−3	Oliveira 41'	Report	Fábio Santos 56' (pen.)	Stadium: Estádio Olímpico Pedro Ludovico; Attendance: 0 Referee: Jean Pierre Gonçalves Lima
Note: It was played behind closed doors due to the COVID-19 pandemic in Brazil.

14 November 2020 21	Corinthians	1−2	Atlético Mineiro	São Paulo
19:00 UTC−3	Davó 5'	Report	Arana 60'; Marrony 82'	Stadium: Neo Química Arena; Attendance: 0 Referee: Rodrigo D'Alonso Ferreira
Note: It was played behind closed doors due to the COVID-19 pandemic in Brazil.

22 November 2020 22	Corinthians	0−0	Grêmio	São Paulo
20:30 UTC−3		Report		Stadium: Neo Química Arena; Attendance: 0 Referee: Caio Max Augusto Vieira
Note: It was played behind closed doors due to the COVID-19 pandemic in Brazil.

25 November 2020 23	Coritiba	0−1	Corinthians	Curitiba
21:30 UTC−3		Report	Fábio Santos 20' (pen.)	Stadium: Estádio Couto Pereira; Attendance: 0 Referee: Leandro Vuaden
Note: It was played behind closed doors due to the COVID-19 pandemic in Brazil.

2 December 2020 24	Fortaleza	0−0	Corinthians	Fortaleza
21:30 UTC−3		Report		Stadium: Arena Castelão; Attendance: 0 Referee: Bráulio da Silva Machado
Note: It was played behind closed doors due to the COVID-19 pandemic in Brazil.

13 December 2020 25	Corinthians	1−0	São Paulo	São Paulo
18:15 UTC−3	Otero 24'	Report		Stadium: Neo Química Arena; Attendance: 0 Referee: Raphael Claus
Note: It was played behind closed doors due to the COVID-19 pandemic in Brazil.

21 December 2020 26	Corinthians	2−1	Goiás	São Paulo
20:00 UTC−3	Gustavo Silva 13'; Jô 50'	Report	Fernandão 3'	Stadium: Neo Química Arena; Attendance: 0 Referee: Bruno Arleu de Araújo
Note: It was played behind closed doors due to the COVID-19 pandemic in Brazil.

27 December 2020 27	Botafogo	0−2	Corinthians	Rio de Janeiro
16:00 UTC−3		Report	Cazares 33'; Mateus Vital 90+4'	Stadium: Estádio Olímpico Nilton Santos; Attendance: 0 Referee: Héber Roberto Lopes
Note: It was played behind closed doors due to the COVID-19 pandemic in Brazil.

13 January 2021 29	Corinthians	5−0	Fluminense	São Paulo
21:30 UTC−3	Jô 25'; Cazares 54'; Fagner 60'; Mateus Vital 66'; Luan 89'	Report		Stadium: Neo Química Arena; Attendance: 0 Referee: Rafael Traci
Note: It was played behind closed doors due to the COVID-19 pandemic in Brazil.

18 January 2021 28	Palmeiras	4−0	Corinthians	São Paulo
19:00 UTC−3	Raphael Veiga 33', 47'; Luiz Adriano 44', 65'	Report		Stadium: Allianz Parque; Attendance: 0 Referee: Jean Pierre Gonçalves Lima
Note: This match was originally scheduled for 6 January, but it was postponed due to Palmeiras's participation in the semifinals of the 2020 Copa Libertadores. It was played behind closed doors due to the COVID-19 pandemic in Brazil.

21 January 2021 31	Corinthians	3−0	Sport Recife	São Paulo
21:00 UTC−3	Gustavo Silva 33'; Mateus Vital 46'; Jô 79'	Report		Stadium: Neo Química Arena; Attendance: 0 Referee: Anderson Daronco
Note: It was played behind closed doors due to the COVID-19 pandemic in Brazil.

25 January 2021 32	Corinthians	0−2	Red Bull Bragantino	São Paulo
20:00 UTC−3		Report	Helinho 1'; Claudinho 41'	Stadium: Neo Química Arena; Attendance: 0 Referee: Bruno Arleu de Araújo
Note: It was played behind closed doors due to the COVID-19 pandemic in Brazil.

28 January 2021 30	Bahia	2−1	Corinthians	Salvador
19:00 UTC−3	Gilberto 30'; Ramírez 45+3'	Report	Gabriel 70'	Stadium: Itaipava Arena Fonte Nova; Attendance: 0 Referee: Ricardo Marques
Note: This match was originally scheduled for 17 January, but it was postponed due to schedule adjustments. It was played behind closed doors due to the COVID-19 pandemic in Brazil.

3 February 2021 34	Corinthians	2−1	Ceará	São Paulo
21:30 UTC−3	Fábio Santos 20' (pen.); Léo Natel 27'	Report	Fabinho 15'	Stadium: Neo Química Arena; Attendance: 0 Referee: Héber Roberto Lopes
Note: It was played behind closed doors due to the COVID-19 pandemic in Brazil.

10 February 2021 35	Corinthians	3−3	Athletico Paranaense	São Paulo
21:30 UTC−3	Gustavo Silva 2', 55'; Gabriel 17'	Report	Abner 13'; Canesin 33'; Vitinho 72'	Stadium: Neo Química Arena; Attendance: 0 Referee: Jean Pierre Gonçalves Lima
Note: This match was originally scheduled for 7 February, but it was postponed due to broadcast requests. It was played behind closed doors due to the COVID-19 pandemic in Brazil.

14 February 2021 36	Flamengo	2–1	Corinthians	Rio de Janeiro
16:00 UTC−3	Willian Arão 9'; Gabriel 54'	Report	Léo Natel 19'	Stadium: Maracanã; Attendance: 0 Referee: Rafael Traci
Note: It was played behind closed doors due to the COVID-19 pandemic in Brazil.

17 February 2021 33	Santos	1–0	Corinthians	Santos
19:00 UTC−3	Marcos Leonardo 54'	Report		Stadium: Vila Belmiro; Attendance: 0 Referee: Vinícius Gonçalves Dias Araújo
Note: This match was originally scheduled for 31 January, but it was postponed due to Santos' participation in the 2020 Copa Libertadores Final. It was played behind closed doors due to the COVID-19 pandemic in Brazil.

21 February 2021 37	Corinthians	0–0	Vasco da Gama	São Paulo
16:00 UTC−3		Report		Stadium: Neo Química Arena; Attendance: 0 Referee: Anderson Daronco
Note: It was played behind closed doors due to the COVID-19 pandemic in Brazil.

25 February 2021 38	Internacional	0–0	Corinthians	Porto Alegre
21:30 UTC−3		Report		Stadium: Estádio Beira-Rio; Attendance: 0 Referee: Wilton Sampaio
Note: It was played behind closed doors due to the COVID-19 pandemic in Brazil.

== Copa do Brasil ==
Due to being qualified for the 2020 Copa Libertadores, Corinthians entered the competition at the round of 16.

=== Knockout stages ===
28 October 2020 Round of 16	Corinthians	0−1	América Mineiro	São Paulo
21:30 UTC−3		Report	Marcelo Toscano 88'	Stadium: Neo Química Arena; Attendance: 0 Referee: Rodrigo D'Alonso Ferreira
Note: It was played behind closed doors due to the COVID-19 pandemic in Brazil.

4 November 2020 Round of 16	América Mineiro	1–1 (2–1 agg.)	Corinthians	Belo Horizonte
21:30 UTC−3	Rodolfo 83' (pen.)	Report	Fagner 59' (pen.)	Stadium: Estádio Independência; Attendance: 0 Referee: Wagner Nascimento de Magalhães
Note: It was played behind closed doors due to the COVID-19 pandemic in Brazil.

== See also ==
- List of Sport Club Corinthians Paulista seasons
