= 2021 Sport Club Corinthians Paulista season =

Corinthians 2021 football season

Corinthians
2021 season
- President: Duílio Monteiro Alves
- Manager: Vágner Mancini (until 16 May); Fernando Lázaro (caretaker, 17 May – 22 May); Sylvinho (from 23 May)
- Stadium: Neo Química Arena
- Série A: 5th
- Copa do Brasil: Third round
- Campeonato Paulista: Semi-finals
- Copa Sudamericana: Group stage
- Top goalscorer: League: Jô; Róger Guedes (7 each); All: Jô (10)
- Highest home attendance: 44,187 vs Grêmio (5 December 2021)
- Lowest home attendance: 10,624 vs Bahia (5 October 2021)
Home colors	Away colors	Third colors

The 2021 season was the 112th season in the history of Sport Club Corinthians Paulista. The season covered the period from 26 February 2021 to December 2021. The effects of the COVID-19 pandemic and its major impact in the 2020 season were still felt on this season, as there was no pre-season and the first game took place just three days after the last season's match. The majority of games were still played behind closed doors.

== Background ==
=== Kit ===
- Home (June 2021 onward): White shirt, black shorts and white socks;
- Away (May 2021 onward): Black with white stripes shirt, white shorts and black socks;
- Third (September 2021 onward): Purple shirt, purple shorts and purple socks.

=== Previous Kits ===
- Home (Until June 2021): White shirt, black shorts and white socks;
- Away (Until May 2021): Black with white stripes shirt, white shorts and black socks;
- Third (Until September 2021): Brown and blue shirt, brown shorts and brown socks.

=== COVID-19 pandemic ===
On October 5, Corinthians played their first match with fans in the stadium since February 25, 2020, as Neo Química Arena featured a 30% stadium capacity. Matches are expected to feature a 50% stadium capacity as of October 15 and full capacity in November.

== Squad ==
As of 1 December 2021

Note: Flags indicate national team as defined under FIFA eligibility rules; some limited exceptions apply. Players may hold more than one non-FIFA nationality.

No.	Pos.	Nation	Player
1	GK	BRA	Caíque França
2	DF	BRA	João Pedro (on loan from Porto)
4	DF	BRA	Gil
5	MF	BRA	Gabriel
6	DF	BRA	Lucas Piton
7	FW	BRA	Luan
8	MF	BRA	Renato Augusto
10	FW	BRA	Willian
11	MF	BRA	Giuliano
12	GK	BRA	Cássio (captain)
13	DF	BRA	Léo Santos
17	FW	BRA	Cauê (on loan from Novorizontino)
19	FW	BRA	Gustavo Silva
20	MF	BRA	Marquinhos
22	GK	BRA	Carlos Miguel
23	DF	BRA	Fagner
24	MF	COL	Víctor Cantillo

No.	Pos.	Nation	Player
25	FW	BRA	Felipe Augusto
26	DF	BRA	Fábio Santos
28	MF	BRA	Adson
29	MF	BRA	Roni
31	MF	BRA	Gustavo Mantuan
32	GK	BRA	Matheus Donelli
33	DF	BRA	João Victor
34	DF	BRA	Raul Gustavo
35	DF	BRA	Danilo Avelar
36	MF	BRA	Ruan (on loan from Metropolitano)
37	MF	BRA	Du Queiroz
38	MF	BRA	Gabriel Pereira
39	MF	BRA	Xavier
43	MF	BRA	Vitinho
44	MF	BRA	Luis Mandaca
77	FW	BRA	Jô
123	FW	BRA	Róger Guedes

== Managerial changes ==
On May 16, Vágner Mancini was fired after losing the 2021 Campeonato Paulista semi-finals to Palmeiras at Neo Química Arena. The club decided that three club professionals would take over training duties while a new manager was expected to be chosen: head of performance analysis Fernando Lázaro, fitness coach Flávio de Oliveira and head scout Mauro da Silva. Lázaro served as caretaker for the last two matches at the 2021 Copa Sudamericana against Sport Huancayo and River Plate.

On May 23, former club player Sylvinho was announced as the club's new manager until December 2022. He is expected to make his debut at the first match of the 2021 Campeonato Brasileiro Série A.

Manager	Signed from	Date of signing	Date of departure	Signed with	Source
(Brazil) Vágner Mancini	(Brazil) Atlético Goianiense	12 October 2020	16 May 2021	—	
(Brazil) Fernando Lázaro	Head of performance analysis (caretaker)	17 May 2021	22 May 2021	—	
(Brazil) Sylvinho	Free agent	23 May 2021	—	—	

== Transfers ==
=== Transfers in ===
#	Position:	Player	Transferred from	Fee	Date	Team	Source
	FW	(Brazil) André Luis	(China) Shanghai Shenhua	Transfer cancelled (Note: André Luis was transferred to Korean club Daejeon Hana Citizen in June 2020 after originally being loaned. They were not able to fulfill the original deal and Chinese club Shanghai Shenhua opted to take the debt as means to sign the player and loaned him back to Daejeon until the end of 2020. After Shanghai didn't honor the payment as well, Corinthians requested André's return and filled a indemnity action within FIFA.)	9 February 2021	First team	
	FW	(Brazil) John Kléber	(Brazil) Ponte Preta	Free transfer (Rescinded contract) (Note: John Kléber was already on loan since 2019.)	23 February 2021	Under-23s	
44	MF	(Brazil) Luis Mandaca	(Brazil) CSP	R$800,000 (Note: Luis Mandaca was already on loan since September 2020 until February 2022.)	25 March 2021	Academy	
24	MF	(Colombia) Víctor Cantillo	(Colombia) Atlético Junior	U$2,900,000 (~R$15,000,000) (Note: Víctor Cantillo was already on loan since January 2020 with an obligation to buy in June 2021.)	29 June 2021	First team	
11	MF	(Brazil) Giuliano	(Turkey) İstanbul Başakşehir	Free transfer (Rescinded contract)	16 July 2021	First team	
8	MF	(Brazil) Renato Augusto	(China) Beijing Guoan	Free transfer (Rescinded contract)	22 July 2021	First team	
123	FW	(Brazil) Róger Guedes	(China) Shandong Taishan	Free transfer (Rescinded contract)	27 August 2021	First team	
22	GK	(Brazil) Carlos Miguel	(Brazil) Internacional	Free transfer (Rescinded contract)	27 August 2021	First team	
10	FW	(Brazil) Willian	(England) Arsenal	Free transfer (Rescinded contract)	30 August 2021	First team	
	MF	(Brazil) Richard	(Brazil) Athletico Paranaense	Loan cancelled (Note: Richard was loaned to Athletico Paranaense in July 2020 until December 2021.)	28 October 2021	First team	

=== Loans in ===
#	Position	Player	Loaned from	Date	Loan expires	Team	Source
36	MF	(Brazil) Ruan	(Brazil) Metropolitano	2 March 2021	30 June 2022 (Note: Loan extension, as Ruan was already on loan until July 2021.)	First team	
	FW	(Brazil) Anderson Chaves	(Brazil) Vila Nova	5 March 2021	31 March 2022	Academy	
	MF	(Brazil) Vitor	(Brazil) Globo	15 March 2021	31 December 2022	Academy	
	DF	(Brazil) Carlão	(Brazil) Náutico	24 March 2021	31 December 2021 (Cancelled on 11 June 2021)	Academy	
	MF	(Brazil) Matheus Melo	(Brazil) Linense	9 June 2021	31 December 2021	Under-23s	
	MF	(Brazil) Winicius Maia	(Brazil) Aparecidense	9 June 2021	31 December 2021	Under-23s	
	FW	(Brazil) Luan Henrique	(Brazil) Linense	9 June 2021	31 December 2021	Academy	
	GK	(Brazil) Wesley Borges	(Brazil) Ituano	9 June 2021	31 December 2022	Academy	
2	DF	(Brazil) João Pedro	(Portugal) Porto	31 August 2021	30 June 2022	First team	

=== Transfers out ===
#	Position	Player	Transferred to	Fee	Date	Team	Source
25	DF	(Brazil) Marllon	(Brazil) Cuiabá	Free transfer (Rescinded contract)	7 March 2021	First team	
	DF	(Brazil) Yago	(Brazil) Náutico	Free transfer (Rescinded contract)	11 March 2021	First team	
	MF	(Brazil) Fabrício Oya	(Belarus) Torpedo-BelAZ Zhodino	Free transfer (Rescinded contract)	15 March 2021	First team	
10	MF	(Ecuador) Juan Cazares	(Brazil) Fluminense	Free transfer (Rescinded contract)	14 April 2021	First team	
20	MF	(Brazil) Camacho	(Brazil) Santos	Free transfer (Rescinded contract)	15 June 2021	First team	
11	MF	(Venezuela) Rómulo Otero	Free agent (Note: Rómulo Otero was loaned from Atlético Mineiro in August 2020 until the end of his contract.)	End of loan	1 July 2021	First team	
3	DF	(Brazil) Jemerson	Free agent	End of contract	1 July 2021	First team	
	DF	(Brazil) Lucas Pires	(Brazil) Santos	Free transfer (End of contract)	10 July 2021	Academy	
27	FW	(Brazil) Antony	(Brazil) Joinville	End of loan	15 July 2021	Academy	
21	MF	(Chile) Ángelo Araos	(Mexico) Necaxa	Undisclosed (U$1,000,000 ~R$5,700,000)	1 December 2021	First team	

=== Loans out ===
#	Position	Player	Loaned to	Date	Loan expires	Team	Source
	DF	(Brazil) Matheus Alexandre	(Brazil) Inter de Limeira	4 January 2021	31 May 2021	First team	
	MF	(Brazil) Thiaguinho	(Brazil) Inter de Limeira	4 January 2021	31 May 2021	First team	
	DF	(Brazil) Caetano	(Brazil) São Caetano	2 February 2021	31 May 2021	First team	
	FW	(Brazil) Rafael Bilú	(Brazil) Mirassol	16 February 2021	31 May 2021	First team	
	MF	(Brazil) Warian	(Brazil) São Caetano	23 February 2021	31 May 2021	Under-23s	
	FW	(Brazil) Gabriel Lima	(Brazil) Metropolitano	24 February 2021	31 May 2021	Under-23s	
	DF	(Brazil) Kevin Emmel	(Brazil) Metropolitano	24 February 2021	31 May 2021	Academy	
	MF	(Brazil) Janderson	(Brazil) Atlético Goianiense	26 February 2021	31 December 2021	First team	
33	FW	(Brazil) Matheus Davó	(Brazil) Guarani	28 February 2021	31 December 2021 (Cancelled on 31 July 2021)	First team	
15	MF	(Brazil) Éderson	(Brazil) Fortaleza	1 March 2021	31 December 2021	First team	
27	GK	(Brazil) Walter	(Brazil) Cuiabá	2 March 2021	31 December 2021	First team	
28	FW	(Brazil) Jonathan Cafú	(Brazil) Cuiabá	5 March 2021	31 December 2021	First team	
	FW	(Brazil) Madson	(Brazil) Santa Cruz	5 March 2021	31 December 2021 (Cancelled on 31 August 2021)	First team	
	MF	(Brazil) Marquinhos	(Brazil) Sport Recife	10 March 2021	31 December 2021 (Cancelled on 25 June 2021)	First team	
	FW	(Brazil) André Luis	(Brazil) Atlético Goianiense	22 March 2021	31 December 2021	First team	
	MF	(Brazil) Matheus Jesus	(Brazil) Juventude	30 March 2021	31 December 2021 (Cancelled on 22 September 2021)	First team	
2	DF	(Brazil) Michel Macedo	(Brazil) Juventude	22 April 2021	31 December 2021	First team	
37	FW	(Brazil) Everaldo	(Brazil) Sport Recife	24 April 2021	31 December 2021	First team	
	MF	(Brazil) Fessin	(Brazil) Ponte Preta	2 June 2021	31 December 2021	First team	
	DF	(Brazil) Caetano	(Brazil) CRB	2 June 2021	31 December 2021	First team	
8	MF	(Brazil) Ramiro	(United Arab Emirates) Al-Wasl	1 July 2021	30 June 2022	First team	
14	DF	(Uruguay) Bruno Méndez	(Brazil) Internacional	1 July 2021	30 June 2022	First team	
	MF	(Ecuador) Junior Sornoza	(Ecuador) Independiente del Valle	10 July 2021 (Note: Junior Sornoza was already on loan to Mexican club Tijuana since January 2021 until the end of this season. The deal was cancelled before he was loaned to Independiente del Valle)	31 December 2022	First team	
	FW	(Brazil) Matheus Davó	(United States) Philadelphia Union	11 August 2021	31 December 2021	First team	
	FW	(Brazil) Nathan	(Spain) Racing de Ferrol	21 August 2021	30 June 2022	Under-23s	
22	MF	(Brazil) Mateus Vital	(Greece) Panathinaikos	29 August 2021	30 June 2022	First team	
18	FW	(Brazil) Léo Natel	(Cyprus) APOEL	31 August 2021	30 June 2022	First team	
	FW	(Brazil) Madson	(Portugal) Estrela da Amadora	1 September 2021	30 June 2022	First team	
30	FW	(Brazil) Rodrigo Varanda	(Brazil) São Bernardo	11 September 2021	30 May 2022 (Cancelled on 18 November 2021)	First team	
	FW	(Brazil) Rafael Bilú	(Brazil) Juventude	24 September 2021	31 December 2021	First team	
27	DF	(Brazil) Matheus Alexandre	(Brazil) Coritiba	27 September 2021	31 December 2021	First team	
	MF	(Brazil) Matheus Jesus	(Brazil) Náutico	30 September 2021	31 December 2021	First team	

== Squad statistics ==
No.	Pos.	Name	Campeonato Paulista		Copa Sudamericana		Campeonato Brasileiro		Copa do Brasil		Total		Discipline	
No.	Pos.	Name	Apps	Goals	Apps	Goals	Apps	Goals	Apps	Goals	Apps	Goals	Yellow card	Red card
1	GK	(Brazil) Caíque França	0	0	0	0	0	0	0	0	0	0	0	0
2	DF	(Brazil) João Pedro	0	0	0	0	0 (1)	0	0	0	0 (1)	0	0	0
4	DF	(Brazil) Gil	8 (2)	0	4 (1)	1	37	0	4	0	53 (3)	1	7	0
5	MF	(Brazil) Gabriel	9	0	2	0	29 (2)	2	3 (1)	0	43 (3)	2	10	1
6	DF	(Brazil) Lucas Piton	8	1	2 (1)	0	6 (1)	0	2 (1)	0	18 (3)	1	0	0
7	FW	(Brazil) Luan	7 (2)	1	4	3	6 (12)	0	2	0	19 (14)	4	4	0
8	MF	(Brazil) Renato Augusto	0	0	0	0	16 (5)	4	0	0	16 (5)	4	2	0
10	FW	(Brazil) Willian	0	0	0	0	6 (3)	0	0	0	6 (3)	0	0	0
11	MF	(Brazil) Giuliano	0	0	0	0	21	3	0	0	21	3	1	0
12	GK	(Brazil) Cássio	11	0	6	0	37	0	4	0	58	0	3	0
13	DF	(Brazil) Léo Santos	0 (3)	0	0	0	0	0	0	0	0 (3)	0	0	0
16	MF	(Brazil) Matheus Araújo	0 (1)	0	0	0	0	0	0	0	0 (1)	0	0	0
17	FW	(Brazil) Cauê	6 (2)	1	1 (3)	1	0 (1)	0	0 (1)	0	7 (7)	2	2	0
19	FW	(Brazil) Gustavo Silva	5 (4)	2	2 (2)	2	21 (16)	2	3	0	30 (22)	6	2	0
20	MF	(Brazil) Marquinhos	0	0	0	0	0 (10)	0	0	0	0 (10)	0	1	0
22	GK	(Brazil) Carlos Miguel	0	0	0	0	0	0	0	0	0	0	0	0
23	DF	(Brazil) Fagner	6	1	3	0	36	0	3	0	48	1	10	2
24	MF	(Colombia) Víctor Cantillo	4 (2)	0	1 (2)	0	18 (3)	2	1	0	24 (7)	2	6	1
25	FW	(Brazil) Felipe Augusto	0 (1)	0	0	0	0 (3)	0	0	0	0 (4)	0	0	0
26	DF	(Brazil) Fábio Santos	4 (1)	2	4 (1)	0	32	3	2	0	42 (2)	5	7	0
28	MF	(Brazil) Adson	0 (4)	0	1 (2)	0	6 (10)	3	0 (1)	0	7 (17)	3	0	0
29	MF	(Brazil) Roni	4 (4)	0	2 (1)	0	14 (7)	3	1 (1)	0	21 (13)	3	7	0
31	MF	(Brazil) Gustavo Mantuan	0	0	0	0	0 (2)	0	0	0	0 (2)	0	0	0
32	GK	(Brazil) Matheus Donelli	3	0	0 (1)	0	1	0	0	0	4 (1)	0	1	0
33	DF	(Brazil) João Victor	7 (1)	0	3	0	36	0	1	0	47 (1)	0	6	1
34	DF	(Brazil) Raul Gustavo	6	2	3	0	3	0	1	0	13	2	6	0
35	DF	(Brazil) Danilo Avelar	0	0	0	0	0	0	0	0	0	0	0	0
36	MF	(Brazil) Ruan	0	0	0	0	0	0	0	0	0	0	0	0
37	MF	(Brazil) Du Queiroz	0	0	0	0	10 (6)	0	0	0	10 (6)	0	1	0
38	MF	(Brazil) Gabriel Pereira	2 (5)	0	0 (3)	0	17 (4)	2	0 (1)	0	19 (13)	2	2	0
39	MF	(Brazil) Xavier	3 (1)	0	2	0	2 (14)	0	0	0	7 (15)	0	1	1
43	MF	(Brazil) Vitinho	2 (1)	0	0 (3)	0	7 (15)	1	0	0	9 (19)	1	1	0
44	MF	(Brazil) Luis Mandaca	2	1	1	0	0	0	0	0	3	1	0	0
77	FW	(Brazil) Jô	6 (4)	2	4 (2)	1	24 (7)	7	3 (2)	0	37 (15)	10	1	0
123	FW	(Brazil) Róger Guedes	0	0	0	0	19	7	0	0	19	7	3	0
Players transferred out during the season
3	DF	(Brazil) Jemerson	11	2	1	0	0	0	2	1	14	3	1	0
8	MF	(Brazil) Ramiro	7 (2)	0	2 (2)	2	2 (4)	0	2 (2)	1	13 (10)	3	7	0
10	MF	(Ecuador) Juan Cazares	1 (2)	0	0	0	0	0	1 (1)	0	2 (3)	0	0	0
11	MF	(Venezuela) Rómulo Otero	7 (4)	1	3 (1)	0	0	0	2	1	12 (5)	2	4	0
14	DF	(Uruguay) Bruno Méndez	7 (1)	1	4	0	0	0	1 (2)	0	12 (3)	1	3	0
18	FW	(Brazil) Léo Natel	3 (6)	0	2 (2)	0	0 (3)	0	0 (3)	0	5 (14)	0	1	0
20	MF	(Brazil) Camacho	3 (2)	1	4 (1)	0	1 (1)	0	1 (1)	0	9 (5)	1	4	0
21	MF	(Chile) Ángelo Araos	0 (3)	0	2	0	2 (9)	0	2	0	6 (12)	0	3	0
22	MF	(Brazil) Mateus Vital	5 (3)	2	3 (1)	2	10 (6)	0	2 (1)	1	20 (11)	5	1	0
27	FW	(Brazil) Antony	1 (2)	0	0	0	0	0	0	0	1 (2)	0	1	0
27	DF	(Brazil) Matheus Alexandre	0	0	0	0	0	0	0	0	0	0	0	0
30	MF	(Brazil) Rodrigo Varanda	7 (1)	1	0	0	0	0	2	0	9 (1)	1	1	0

== Overview ==
Competition	First match	Last match	Starting round	Final position	Record							
Competition	First match	Last match	Starting round	Final position	Pld	W	D	L	GF	GA	GD	Win %
Série A	30 May 2021	9 December 2021	Matchday 1	5th	38	15	12	11	40	36	+4	39.47
Copa do Brasil	17 March 2021	9 June 2021	First round	Third round	4	1	2	1	4	3	+1	25.00
Campeonato Paulista	28 February 2021	16 May 2021	Matchday 1	Semi-finals	14	8	4	2	21	12	+9	57.14
Copa Sudamericana	22 April 2021	26 May 2021	Group stage	Group stage	6	3	1	2	12	6	+6	50.00
Total					62	27	19	16	77	57	+20	43.55

Source: Competitions

== Campeonato Paulista ==
For the 2021 Campeonato Paulista, the 16 teams are divided in four groups of 4 teams (A, B, C, D). They faced all teams, except those that were in their own group, with the top two teams from each group qualifying for the quarterfinals. The two overall worst teams were relegated.

=== First stage ===
Pos	Team	Pld	W	D	L	GF	GA	GD	Pts	Qualification or relegation
1	Corinthians	12	7	4	1	17	9	+8	25	Knockout stage
2	Inter de Limeira	12	6	0	6	8	12	−4	18	Knockout stage
3	Botafogo	12	2	6	4	10	15	−5	12	Troféu do Interior
4	Santo André	12	3	4	5	9	13	−4	13	Troféu do Interior

Source: Soccerway

28 February 2021 1	Red Bull Bragantino	0–0	Corinthians	Bragança Paulista
18:00 UTC−3		Report		Stadium: Estádio Nabi Abi Chedid; Attendance: 0 Referee: Thiago Luis Scarascati
Note: It was played behind closed doors due to the COVID-19 pandemic in Brazil.

3 March 2021 2	Corinthians	2–2	Palmeiras	São Paulo
19:00 UTC−3	Mateus Vital 35'; Varanda 47'	Report	Lucas Lima 4'; Gabriel Silva 25'	Stadium: Neo Química Arena; Attendance: 0 Referee: Edina Alves Batista
Note: It was played behind closed doors due to the COVID-19 pandemic in Brazil.

7 March 2021 3	Corinthians	2–1	Ponte Preta	São Paulo
11:00 UTC−3	Mateus Vital 45'; Jô 77'	Report	João Veras 30'	Stadium: Neo Química Arena; Attendance: 0 Referee: Raphael Claus
Note: It was played behind closed doors due to the COVID-19 pandemic in Brazil.

14 March 2021 4	São Caetano	0–1	Corinthians	São Caetano do Sul
19:00 UTC−3		Report	Méndez 41'	Stadium: Estádio Anacleto Campanella; Attendance: 0 Referee: Douglas Marques das Flores
Note: It was played behind closed doors due to the COVID-19 pandemic in Brazil.

23 March 2021 5	Mirassol	0–1	Corinthians	Volta Redonda (Rio de Janeiro)
21:00 UTC−3		Report	Gustavo Silva 20'	Stadium: Estádio Raulino de Oliveira (Note: Mirassol played their home match at Estádio Raulino de Oliveira, Volta Redonda, Rio de Janeiro instead of their regular stadium Estádio Municipal José Maria de Campos Maia, Mirassol due to São Paulo's government two-week lockdown measures related to the COVID-19 pandemic in Brazil.); Attendance: 0 Referee: Vinícius Gonçalves Dias Araújo
Note: The match was originally expected to take place on 22 March, but was anticipated a day due to broadcast requests. It was then indefinitely postponed on March 18 due to São Paulo's government lockdown measures. The FPF announced on March 22 that the game was rescheduled for the following day. It was played behind closed doors due to the COVID-19 pandemic in Brazil.

11 April 2021 11	Guarani	0–1	Corinthians	Campinas
20:00 UTC−3		Report	Cauê 72'	Stadium: Estádio Brinco de Ouro; Attendance: 0 Referee: Luiz Flávio de Oliveira
Note: The match was originally scheduled for 18 April, but it was anticipated by FPF on 9 April. It was played behind closed doors due to the COVID-19 pandemic in Brazil.

13 April 2021 9	Ferroviária	2–1	Corinthians	Araraquara
20:00 UTC−3	Higor Meritão 73'; Xandão 88'	Report	Camacho 42'	Stadium: Arena da Fonte Luminosa; Attendance: 0 Referee: Thiago Luis Scarascati
Note: The match was originally scheduled for 4 April, but it was indefinitely postponed on 26 March due to São Paulo's government lockdown measures. FPF rescheduled the game on 9 April. It was played behind closed doors due to the COVID-19 pandemic in Brazil.

16 April 2021 7	Corinthians	1–1	São Bento	São Paulo
20:00 UTC−3	Fábio Santos 76' (pen.)	Report	Gabriel 7'	Stadium: Neo Química Arena; Attendance: 0 Referee: Thiago Duarte Peixoto
Note: The match was originally scheduled for 28 March, but it was indefinitely postponed on 22 March due to São Paulo's government lockdown measures. FPF rescheduled the game on 9 April. It was played behind closed doors due to the COVID-19 pandemic in Brazil.

18 April 2021 6	Corinthians	2–0	Ituano	São Paulo
22:00 UTC−3	Otero 45+3'; Jô 63'	Report		Stadium: Neo Química Arena; Attendance: 0 Referee: Edina Alves Batista
Note: The match was originally scheduled for 24 March, but it was indefinitely postponed on 22 March due to São Paulo's government lockdown measures. FPF rescheduled the game on 13 April. It was played behind closed doors due to the COVID-19 pandemic in Brazil.

25 April 2021 8	Santos	0–2	Corinthians	Santos
20:00 UTC−3		Report	Raul Gustavo 38'; Piton 45'	Stadium: Vila Belmiro; Attendance: 0 Referee: Salim Fende Chaves
Note: The match was originally scheduled for 31 March, but it was indefinitely postponed on 26 March due to São Paulo's government lockdown measures. FPF rescheduled the game on 14 April. It was played behind closed doors due to the COVID-19 pandemic in Brazil.

2 May 2021 10	Corinthians	2–2	São Paulo	São Paulo
22:15 UTC−3	Luan 40'; Gustavo Silva 84'	Report	Miranda 14'; Luciano 90+5' (pen.)	Stadium: Neo Química Arena; Attendance: 0 Referee: Flávio Rodrigues de Souza
Note: The match was originally scheduled for 11 April, but it was indefinitely postponed on 26 March due to São Paulo's government lockdown measures. FPF rescheduled the game on 14 April. It was played behind closed doors due to the COVID-19 pandemic in Brazil.

9 May 2021 12	Corinthians	2–1	Novorizontino	São Paulo
16:00 UTC−3	Fábio Santos 38' (pen.); Mandaca 62'	Report	Douglas Baggio 60' (pen.)	Stadium: Neo Química Arena; Attendance: 0 Referee: Luiz Flávio de Oliveira
Note: The match was originally scheduled for 25 April, but it was rescheduled by FPF on 14 April due to the previous adjustments. It was played behind closed doors due to the COVID-19 pandemic in Brazil.

=== Knockout stages ===
11 May 2021 Quarter-finals	Corinthians	4–1	Inter de Limeira	São Paulo
16:00 UTC−3	Fagner 9'; Jemerson 58', 77'; Raul Gustavo 90+2'	Report	Thalisson Kelven 63'	Stadium: Neo Química Arena; Attendance: 0 Referee: Douglas Marques das Flores
Note: It was played behind closed doors due to the COVID-19 pandemic in Brazil.

16 May 2021 Semi-finals	Corinthians	0–2	Palmeiras	São Paulo
16:00 UTC−3		Report	Victor Luis 11'; Luiz Adriano 75'	Stadium: Neo Química Arena; Attendance: 0 Referee: Flávio Rodrigues de Souza
Note: It was played behind closed doors due to the COVID-19 pandemic in Brazil.

== Copa Sudamericana ==
=== Group stage ===
Pos	Team	Pld	W	D	L	GF	GA	GD	Pts	Qualification	PEÑ	COR	RIV	SHU
1	(Uruguay) Peñarol	6	4	1	1	15	3	+12	13	Round of 16	—	4–0	3–0	5–1
2	(Brazil) Corinthians	6	3	1	2	12	6	+6	10		0–2	—	4–0	5–0
3	(Paraguay) River Plate	6	3	1	2	6	10	−4	10		2–1	0–0	—	2–1
4	(Peru) Sport Huancayo	6	0	1	5	3	17	−14	1		0–0	0–3	1–2	—

Source: CONMEBOL
Rules for classification: 1) Points; 2) Goal difference; 3) Goals scored; 4) Away goals scored; 5) CONMEBOL ranking.

22 April 2021 1	River Plate (Paraguay)	0–0	(Brazil) Corinthians	Asunción, Paraguay
20:30 UTC−4		Report		Stadium: Estadio Defensores del Chaco (Note: River Plate played their home match at Estadio Defensores del Chaco, Asunción instead of their regular stadium Estadio River Plate, Asunción which did not meet CONMEBOL requirements.); Attendance: 0 Referee: Darío Herrera (Argentina)
Note: It was played behind closed doors due to the COVID-19 pandemic in South America.

29 April 2021 2	Corinthians (Brazil)	0–2	(Uruguay) Peñarol	São Paulo, Brazil
19:15 UTC−3		Report	González 13'; Terans 56'	Stadium: Neo Química Arena; Attendance: 0 Referee: Facundo Tello (Argentina) (Note: Referee Wilmar Roldán from Colombia, who was originally assigned to the Corinthians v Peñarol match was replaced by Facundo Tello from Argentina.)
Note: It was played behind closed doors due to the COVID-19 pandemic in South America.

6 May 2021 3	Sport Huancayo (Peru)	0–3	(Brazil) Corinthians	Lima, Peru
19:30 UTC−5		Report	Luan 4', 75'; Cauê 30'	Stadium: National Stadium (Note: Sport Huancayo played their home match at National Stadium, Lima instead of their regular stadium Estadio Huancayo, Huancayo.); Attendance: 0 Referee: Jhon Ospina (Colombia)
Note: It was played behind closed doors due to the COVID-19 pandemic in South America.

13 May 2021 4	Peñarol (Uruguay)	4–0	(Brazil) Corinthians	Montevideo, Uruguay
21:30 UTC−3	Álvarez Martínez 5', 14', 69'; Canobbio 53'	Report		Stadium: Estadio Campeón del Siglo; Attendance: 0 Referee: Néstor Pitana (Argentina)
Note: It was played behind closed doors due to the COVID-19 pandemic in South America.

20 May 2021 5	Corinthians (Brazil)	5–0	(Peru) Sport Huancayo	São Paulo, Brazil
21:30 UTC−3	Gustavo Silva 5', 68'; Mateus Vital 34'; Gil 55'; Luan 79'	Report		Stadium: Neo Química Arena; Attendance: 0 Referee: Ángelo Hermosilla (Chile)
Note: It was played behind closed doors due to the COVID-19 pandemic in South America.

26 May 2021 6	Corinthians (Brazil)	4–0	(Paraguay) River Plate	São Paulo, Brazil
21:30 UTC−3	Ramiro 21', 58'; Jô 28'; Mateus Vital 33'	Report		Stadium: Neo Química Arena; Attendance: 0 Referee: José Argote (Venezuela)
Note: It was played behind closed doors due to the COVID-19 pandemic in South America.

== Campeonato Brasileiro ==
Pos	Team	Pld	W	D	L	GF	GA	GD	Pts	Qualification or relegation
3	Palmeiras	38	20	6	12	58	43	+15	66	Qualification for Copa Libertadores group stage (Note: Palmeiras qualified for the Copa Libertadores group stage by winning the 2021 Copa Libertadores.)
4	Fortaleza	38	17	7	14	44	45	−1	58	Qualification for Copa Libertadores group stage
5	Corinthians	38	15	12	11	40	36	+4	57	Qualification for Copa Libertadores group stage
6	Red Bull Bragantino	38	14	14	10	55	46	+9	56	Qualification for Copa Libertadores group stage
7	Fluminense	38	15	9	14	38	38	0	54	Qualification for Copa Libertadores second stage

Source: CBF
Rules for classification: 1) points; 2) wins; 3) goal difference; 4) goals scored; 5) head-to-head results (only between two teams); 6) fewest red cards; 7) fewest yellow cards; 8) drawing of lots.

=== Results ===
30 May 2021 1	Corinthians	0–1	Atlético Goianiense	São Paulo
18:15 UTC−3		Report	Zé Roberto 44'	Stadium: Neo Química Arena; Attendance: 0 Referee: Felipe Fernandes de Lima
Note: It was played behind closed doors due to the COVID-19 pandemic in Brazil.

6 June 2021 2	América Mineiro	0–1	Corinthians	Belo Horizonte
16:00 UTC−3		Report	Fábio Santos 29' (pen.)	Stadium: Estádio Independência; Attendance: 0 Referee: Marcelo de Lima Henrique
Note: It was played behind closed doors due to the COVID-19 pandemic in Brazil.

12 June 2021 3	Palmeiras	1–1	Corinthians	São Paulo
19:00 UTC−3	Raphael Veiga 3'	Report	Gabriel 54'	Stadium: Allianz Parque; Attendance: 0 Referee: Flávio Rodrigues de Souza
Note: It was played behind closed doors due to the COVID-19 pandemic in Brazil.

16 June 2021 4	Corinthians	1–2	Red Bull Bragantino	São Paulo
20:30 UTC−3	Roni 18'	Report	Aderlan 51'; Eric Ramires 84'	Stadium: Neo Química Arena; Attendance: 0 Referee: Thiago Luis Scarascati
Note: It was played behind closed doors due to the COVID-19 pandemic in Brazil.

20 June 2021 5	Bahia	0–0	Corinthians	Salvador
16:00 UTC−3		Report		Stadium: Estádio de Pituaçu (Note: Bahia played their home match at Estádio de Pituaçu, Salvador instead of their regular stadium Itaipava Arena Fonte Nova, Salvador.); Attendance: 0 Referee: Bruno Arleu de Araújo
Note: It was played behind closed doors due to the COVID-19 pandemic in Brazil.

24 June 2021 6	Corinthians	2–1	Sport Recife	São Paulo
19:00 UTC−3	Maidana 45+3' (o.g.); Jô 51'	Report	Tréllez 81'	Stadium: Neo Química Arena; Attendance: 0 Referee: Paulo Roberto Alves Júnior
Note: It was played behind closed doors due to the COVID-19 pandemic in Brazil.

27 June 2021 7	Fluminense	1–1	Corinthians	Rio de Janeiro
16:00 UTC−3	Cazares 69'	Report	Jô 36' (pen.)	Stadium: Estádio São Januário (Note: Fluminense played their home match at Estádio São Januário, Rio de Janeiro instead of their regular stadium Maracanã, Rio de Janeiro which was being used at the 2021 Copa América.); Attendance: 0 Referee: Sávio Pereira Sampaio
Note: It was played behind closed doors due to the COVID-19 pandemic in Brazil.

30 June 2021 8	Corinthians	0–0	São Paulo	São Paulo
21:30 UTC−3		Report		Stadium: Neo Química Arena; Attendance: 0 Referee: Leandro Vuaden
Note: It was played behind closed doors due to the COVID-19 pandemic in Brazil.

3 July 2021 9	Corinthians	1–1	Internacional	São Paulo
21:00 UTC−3	Jô 79'	Report	Edenílson 39' (pen.)	Stadium: Neo Química Arena; Attendance: 0 Referee: Marcelo de Lima Henrique
Note: It was played behind closed doors due to the COVID-19 pandemic in Brazil.

8 July 2021 10	Chapecoense	0–1	Corinthians	Chapecó
21:00 UTC−3		Report	Jô 59'	Stadium: Arena Condá; Attendance: 0 Referee: Ricardo Marques Ribeiro
Note: This match was originally scheduled to take place on 7 July, but it was postponed due to broadcast requests. It was played behind closed doors due to the COVID-19 pandemic in Brazil.

11 July 2021 11	Fortaleza	1–0	Corinthians	Fortaleza
20:30 UTC−3	Robson 19'	Report		Stadium: Arena Castelão; Attendance: 0 Referee: Caio Max Augusto Vieira
Note: It was played behind closed doors due to the COVID-19 pandemic in Brazil.

17 July 2021 12	Corinthians	1–2	Atlético Mineiro	São Paulo
19:00 UTC−3	Gustavo Silva 38'	Report	Hulk 64', 86'	Stadium: Neo Química Arena; Attendance: 0 Referee: Jean Pierre Gonçalves Lima
Note: It was played behind closed doors due to the COVID-19 pandemic in Brazil.

26 July 2021 13	Cuiabá	1–2	Corinthians	Cuiabá
19:00 UTC−4	Rafael Elias 70'	Report	Roni 27'; Adson 37'	Stadium: Arena Pantanal; Attendance: 0 Referee: Ramon Abatti Abel
Note: It was played behind closed doors due to the COVID-19 pandemic in Brazil.

1 August 2021 14	Corinthians	1–3	Flamengo	São Paulo
16:00 UTC−3	Vitinho 88'	Report	Éverton Ribeiro 6'; Gustavo Henrique 39'; Bruno Henrique 43'	Stadium: Neo Química Arena; Attendance: 0 Referee: Leandro Vuaden
Note: It was played behind closed doors due to the COVID-19 pandemic in Brazil.

8 August 2021 15	Santos	0–0	Corinthians	Santos
16:00 UTC−3		Report		Stadium: Vila Belmiro; Attendance: 0 Referee: Flávio Rodrigues de Souza
Note: This match was originally scheduled to take place on 7 August, but it was postponed due to broadcast requests. It was played behind closed doors due to the COVID-19 pandemic in Brazil.

15 August 2021 16	Corinthians	3–1	Ceará	São Paulo
16:00 UTC−3	Adson 16', 29'; Renato Augusto 67'	Report	Rick 69'	Stadium: Neo Química Arena; Attendance: 0 Referee: Rodolpho Toski Marques
Note: It was played behind closed doors due to the COVID-19 pandemic in Brazil.

22 August 2021 17	Athletico Paranaense	0–1	Corinthians	Curitiba
16:00 UTC−3		Report	Roni 54'	Stadium: Arena da Baixada; Attendance: 0 Referee: Wilton Pereira Sampaio
Note: It was played behind closed doors due to the COVID-19 pandemic in Brazil.

28 August 2021 18	Grêmio	0–1	Corinthians	Porto Alegre
21:00 UTC−3		Report	Jô 79'	Stadium: Arena do Grêmio; Attendance: 0 Referee: Ricardo Marques Ribeiro
Note: It was played behind closed doors due to the COVID-19 pandemic in Brazil.

7 September 2021 19	Corinthians	1–1	Juventude	São Paulo
21:30 UTC−3	Róger Guedes 85'	Report	Ricardo Bueno 32'	Stadium: Neo Química Arena; Attendance: 0 Referee: Ramon Abatti Abel
Note: This match was originally scheduled to take place on 5 September, but it was postponed due to a 2022 FIFA World Cup qualification match between Brazil and Argentina scheduled for Corinthians' stadium on the same date. It was played behind closed doors due to the COVID-19 pandemic in Brazil.

12 September 2021 20	Atlético Goianiense	1–1	Corinthians	Goiânia
18:15 UTC−3	Zé Roberto 89'	Report	Gabriel Pereira 60'	Stadium: Estádio Antônio Accioly; Attendance: 0 Referee: Antônio Dib Moraes de Sousa
Note: It was played behind closed doors due to the COVID-19 pandemic in Brazil.

19 September 2021 21	Corinthians	1–1	América Mineiro	São Paulo
18:15 UTC−3	Giuliano 17'	Report	Marlon 7'	Stadium: Neo Química Arena; Attendance: 0 Referee: Savio Pereira Sampaio
Note: It was played behind closed doors due to the COVID-19 pandemic in Brazil.

25 September 2021 22	Corinthians	2–1	Palmeiras	São Paulo
19:00 UTC−3	Róger Guedes 20', 84'	Report	Gabriel Menino 45+2'	Stadium: Neo Química Arena; Attendance: 0 Referee: Raphael Claus
Note: It was played behind closed doors due to the COVID-19 pandemic in Brazil.

2 October 2021 23	Red Bull Bragantino	2–2	Corinthians	Bragança Paulista
19:00 UTC−3	Luan Cândido 56'; Hurtado 84'	Report	Renato Augusto 90'; Gustavo Silva 90+6'	Stadium: Estádio Nabi Abi Chedid; Attendance: 0 Referee: Flávio Rodrigues de Souza
Note: It was played behind closed doors due to the COVID-19 pandemic in Brazil.

5 October 2021 24	Corinthians	3–1	Bahia	São Paulo
21:30 UTC−3	Róger Guedes 45+4' (pen.); Cantillo 52'; Jô 69'	Report	Gilberto 33' (pen.)	Stadium: Neo Química Arena; Attendance: 10,624; Referee: Denis da Silva Ribeiro Serafim
Note: It was played with a 30% stadium capacity due to the COVID-19 pandemic in Brazil.

10 October 2021 25	Sport Recife	1–0	Corinthians	São Lourenço da Mata
16:00 UTC−3	Paulinho Moccelin 81'	Report		Stadium: Arena de Pernambuco (Note: Sport Recife played their home match at Arena de Pernambuco, São Lourenço da Mata instead of their regular stadium Ilha do Retiro, Recife.); Attendance: 2,489; Referee: Sávio Pereira Sampaio
Note: It was played with a limited stadium capacity due to the COVID-19 pandemic in Brazil.

13 October 2021 26	Corinthians	1–0	Fluminense	São Paulo
21:00 UTC−3	Gabriel Pereira 69'	Report		Stadium: Neo Química Arena; Attendance: 12,045; Referee: Marielson Alves da Silva
Note: It was played with a 30% stadium capacity due to the COVID-19 pandemic in Brazil.

18 October 2021 27	São Paulo	1–0	Corinthians	São Paulo
20:00 UTC−3	Calleri 7'	Report		Stadium: Estádio do Morumbi; Attendance: 23,874; Referee: Leandro Vuaden
Note: It was played with a 50% stadium capacity due to the COVID-19 pandemic in Brazil.

24 October 2021 28	Internacional	2–2	Corinthians	Porto Alegre
16:00 UTC−3	Rodrigo Lindoso 9'; Gustavo Maia 90+3'	Report	Giuliano 61'; Fábio Santos 67' (pen.)	Stadium: Estádio Beira-Rio; Attendance: 13,216; Referee: Bruno Arleu de Araújo
Note: It was played with a limited stadium capacity due to the COVID-19 pandemic in Brazil.

1 November 2021 29	Corinthians	1–0	Chapecoense	São Paulo
21:30 UTC−3	Róger Guedes 90+8'	Report		Stadium: Neo Química Arena; Attendance: 39,897; Referee: Paulo César Zanovelli
Note: This match was originally scheduled to take place on 31 October, but it was postponed due to a Corinthians request, as it would be the first match with a full stadium capacity since the beginning of the COVID-19 pandemic in Brazil.

6 November 2021 30	Corinthians	1–0	Fortaleza	São Paulo
17:00 UTC−3	Cantillo 87'	Report		Stadium: Neo Química Arena; Attendance: 36,219; Referee: Ramon Abatti Abel

10 November 2021 31	Atlético Mineiro	3–0	Corinthians	Belo Horizonte
19:00 UTC−3	Diego Costa 14'; Keno 51'; Hulk 90+5'	Report		Stadium: Mineirão; Attendance: 58,714; Referee: Bráulio da Silva Machado

13 November 2021 32	Corinthians	3–2	Cuiabá	São Paulo
21:00 UTC−3	Giuliano 3'; Renato Augusto 51'; Róger Guedes 57'	Report	Pepê 45+2'; Paulão 78'	Stadium: Neo Química Arena; Attendance: 38,616; Referee: Rodolpho Toski Marques

17 November 2021 33	Flamengo	1–0	Corinthians	Rio de Janeiro
21:30 UTC−3	Bruno Henrique 90+4'	Report		Stadium: Maracanã; Attendance: 48,981; Referee: Anderson Daronco

21 November 2021 34	Corinthians	2–0	Santos	São Paulo
16:00 UTC−3	Jô 47'; Gabriel 85'	Report		Stadium: Neo Química Arena; Attendance: 43,583; Referee: Leandro Vuaden

25 November 2021 35	Ceará	2–1	Corinthians	Fortaleza
20:00 UTC−3	Vina 47'; González 87'	Report	Róger Guedes 84'	Stadium: Arena Castelão; Attendance: 35,693; Referee: Paulo Roberto Alves Júnior

28 November 2021 36	Corinthians	1–0	Athletico Paranaense	São Paulo
16:00 UTC−3	Fábio Santos 65' (pen.)	Report		Stadium: Neo Química Arena; Attendance: 37,492; Referee: Paulo César Zanovelli

5 December 2021 37	Corinthians	1–1	Grêmio	São Paulo
16:00 UTC−3	Renato Augusto 86'	Report	Diego Souza 39'	Stadium: Neo Química Arena; Attendance: 44,187; Referee: Bruno Arleu de Araújo

9 December 2021 38	Juventude	1–0	Corinthians	Caxias do Sul
21:30 UTC−3	Chico 83' (pen.)	Report		Stadium: Estádio Alfredo Jaconi; Attendance: 18,413; Referee: Rodolpho Toski Marques

== Copa do Brasil ==
=== Preliminary stages ===
17 March 2021 First round	Salgueiro	0–3	Corinthians	Salgueiro
21:30 UTC−3		Report	Jemerson 4'; Ramiro 56'; Mateus Vital 90+3'	Stadium: Estádio Cornélio de Barros; Attendance: 0 Referee: Jean Pierre Gonçalves Lima
Note: It was played behind closed doors due to the COVID-19 pandemic in Brazil.

26 March 2021 Second round	Corinthians	1–1 (5–3 p)	Retrô	Saquarema (Rio de Janeiro)
21:30 UTC−3	Otero 18'	Report	Mayco Félix 82'	Stadium: Estádio Elcyr Resende de Mendonça (Note: Corinthians played their home match at Estádio Elcyr Resende de Mendonça, Saquarema, Rio de Janeiro instead of their regular stadium Neo Química Arena, São Paulo due to São Paulo's government two-week lockdown measures related to the COVID-19 pandemic in Brazil. The game was initially relocated to Estádio Raulino de Oliveira, Volta Redonda, Rio de Janeiro, before the city's mayor opted against it.); Attendance: 0 Referee: Felipe Fernandes de Lima
	Penalties
	Fábio Santos (penalty scored); Jô (penalty scored); Léo Natel (penalty scored); Ramiro (penalty scored); Fagner (penalty scored)		(penalty missed) Gelson; (penalty scored) Neílson; (penalty scored) Guilherme; (penalty scored) Thallyson
Note: It was played behind closed doors due to the COVID-19 pandemic in Brazil.

2 June 2021 Third round	Corinthians	0–2	Atlético Goianiense	São Paulo
21:30 UTC−3		Report	Ronald 10'; João Paulo 20'	Stadium: Neo Química Arena; Attendance: 0 Referee: Bráulio da Silva Machado
Note: It was played behind closed doors due to the COVID-19 pandemic in Brazil.

9 June 2021 Third round	Atlético Goianiense	0–0 (2–0 agg.)	Corinthians	Goiânia
21:30 UTC−3		Report		Stadium: Estádio Antônio Accioly; Attendance: 0 Referee: Caio Max Augusto Vieira
Note: It was played behind closed doors due to the COVID-19 pandemic in Brazil.

== See also ==
- List of Sport Club Corinthians Paulista seasons
