= Mateus Vital =

Brazilian footballer

Personal information
- Full name: Mateus da Silva Vital Assumpção
- Date of birth: 12 February 1998 (age 28)
- Place of birth: Rio de Janeiro, Brazil
- Height: 1.75 m (5 ft 9 in)
- Position: Attacking midfielder

Team information
- Current team: Shanghai Port
- Number: 10

Youth career
- 2003–2015: Vasco da Gama

Senior career*
Years	Team	Apps	(Gls)
2015–2017	Vasco da Gama	36	(2)
2017–2022	Corinthians	161	(10)
2021–2022	→ Panathinaikos (loan)	33	(1)
2023–2024	Cruzeiro	62	(3)
2025–	Shanghai Port	60	(7)

International career
2012–2013	Brazil U15		
2014–2015	Brazil U17		
2019	Brazil U23	4	(2)
- * Club domestic league appearances and goals as of 19 November 2026

Mateus da Silva Vital Assumpção (born 12 February 1998), known as Mateus Vital, is a Brazilian professional footballer who plays as an attacking midfielder for Shanghai Port. He is a former Brazil U23 member.

== Career ==
=== Corinthians ===
Vital started his career in CR Vasco da Gama and was sold to Corinthians for €2 million in 2018. In 2018, Corinthians won its 29th Paulista Championship. Vital was a vital member in the victorious campaign scoring in the penalty shootout against São Paulo FC in the second leg of the semi-final and bagging an assist in the second leg of the final against arch-rivals Palmeiras.

=== Loan to Panathinaikos ===
On 25 August 2021, Corinthians announced an agreement with Panathinaikos for the one-year loan of the 23-year-old midfielder, with a purchase option that was estimated by Brazilian media to reach €4 million for 50% of Vital's rights. Vital made an impressive debut for the club but he wasn't able to maintain his good form and he eventually lost his place in the starting 11.

=== Shanghai Port ===
On 27 January 2025, Vital signed Chinese Super League club Shanghai Port.

== Career statistics ==
As of match played 29 May 2026

Appearances and goals by club, season and competition
Club	Season	League			State League		National cup		Continental		Other		Total	
Club	Season	Division	Apps	Goals	Apps	Goals	Apps	Goals	Apps	Goals	Apps	Goals	Apps	Goals
Vasco da Gama	2015	Série A	1	0	—		—		—		—		1	0
Vasco da Gama	2016	Série B	1	0	4	0	0	0	—		—		5	0
Vasco da Gama	2017	Série A	30	2	—		—		—		—		30	2
Vasco da Gama	Total		32	2	4	0	0	0	—		—		36	2
Corinthians	2018	Série A	33	2	10	0	8	0	7	0	—		58	2
Corinthians	2019	Série A	31	2	11	0	3	1	6	0	—		52	3
Corinthians	2020	Série A	25	4	11	0	2	0	1	0	2	0	41	4
Corinthians	2021	Série A	16	0	8	2	3	1	4	2	—		31	5
Corinthians	2022	Série A	16	0	—		4	0	—		—		20	0
Corinthians	Total		121	8	40	2	20	2	18	2	2	0	203	14
Panathinaikos (loan)	2021–22	Super League Greece	33	1	—		7	2	—		—		40	3
Cruzeiro	2023	Série A	32	0	5	1	3	0	—		—		40	1
Cruzeiro	2024	Série A	19	1	6	1	0	0	6	0	—		31	2
Cruzeiro	Total		51	1	11	2	3	0	6	0	—		71	3
Shanghai Port	2025	Chinese Super League	30	5	—		1	0	10	1	1	0	42	6
Shanghai Port	2026	Chinese Super League	15	2	—		0	0	2	0	1	0	18	2
Shanghai Port	Total		45	7	—		1	0	12	1	2	0	60	8
Career total			282	19	55	4	29	4	36	3	4	0	406	30

== Honours ==
Corinthians

- Campeonato Paulista: 2018, 2019

Panathinaikos

- Greek Cup: 2021–22

Shanghai Port

- Chinese Super League: 2025
