= Léo Santos =

Brazilian footballer (born 1998)

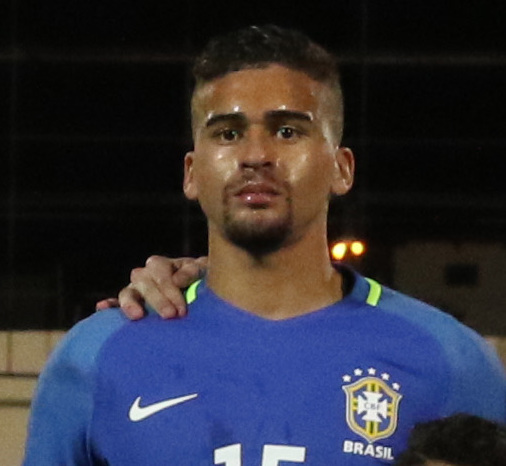
- Santos in 2017

Personal information
- Full name: Leonardo Rodrigues dos Santos
- Date of birth: 9 December 1998 (age 27)
- Place of birth: São Paulo, Brazil
- Height: 1.86 m (6 ft 1 in)
- Position: Centre-back

Team information
- Current team: Nacional
- Number: 34

Youth career
- 2003–2016: Corinthians

Senior career*
Years	Team	Apps	(Gls)
2016–2023	Corinthians	32	(1)
2019	→ Fluminense (loan)	6	(0)
2022	→ Ponte Preta (loan)	15	(0)
2023	→ Ferroviária (loan)	10	(0)
2023	→ Ceará (loan)	19	(2)
2024	Guarani	24	(1)
2024–	Nacional	47	(4)

International career^{‡}
2015–2016	Brazil U17	7	(0)
2016–2017	Brazil U20	5	(0)
- * Club domestic league appearances and goals as of 25 May 2026 ‡ National team caps and goals as of 21 May 2023

Leonardo Rodrigues dos Santos (born 9 December 1998), known as Léo Santos, is a Brazilian professional footballer who plays as a centre-back for and captains Primeira Liga club Nacional.

== Club career ==
=== Early career ===
Born in São Paulo, Santos started his career when he was 10 years old at Corinthians. He was part of the 2016 Copa São Paulo de Futebol Júnior squad that ended up as runner up.

=== Corinthians ===
He made his professional debut as part of the starting team against Figueirense on 16 November 2016.

=== Nacional ===
On 27 August 2024, Santos signed a three-season contract with Nacional in Portugal.

== International career ==
Santos was part of the winning squad of the 2015 South American Under-17 Football Championship. He was also called for the 2015 FIFA U-17 World Cup, despite being an unused substitute in all matches.

== Career statistics ==
As of 26 October 2021

Appearances and goals by club, season and competition
Club	Season	League			State League		National cup		Continental		Other		Total	
Club	Season	Division	Apps	Goals	Apps	Goals	Apps	Goals	Apps	Goals	Apps	Goals	Apps	Goals
Corinthians	2016	Série A	1	0	0	0	0	0	—		—		1	0
Corinthians	2017	Série A	2	0	1	1	0	0	0	0	—		3	1
Corinthians	2018	Série A	22	0	0	0	4	0	2 (Note: Appearance(s) in Copa Libertadores)	0	—		28	0
Corinthians	2019	Série A	0	0	3	0	0	0	0	0	—		3	0
Corinthians	2020	Série A	0	0	0	0	0	0	0	0	—		0	0
Corinthians	2021	Série A	0	0	3	0	0	0	0	0	—		3	0
Corinthians	Total		25	0	7	1	4	0	2	0	—		38	1
Fluminense (loan)	2019	Série A	0	0	6	0	0	0	—		—		6	0
Career total			25	0	13	1	4	0	2	0	0	0	44	1

== Honours ==
Corinthians

- Campeonato Brasileiro Série A: 2017
- Campeonato Paulista: 2017, 2018, 2019

Brazil

- South American Under-17 Football Championship: 2015
