= Lucas Piton =

Professional footballer

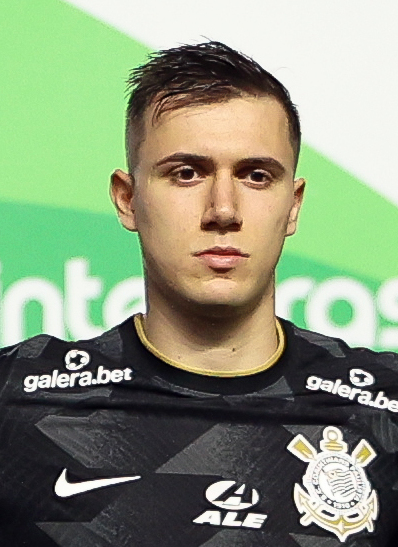

Personal information
- Full name: Lucas Piton Crivellaro
- Date of birth: 9 October 2000 (age 26)
- Place of birth: Jundiaí, Brazil
- Height: 1.75 m (5 ft 9 in)
- Position: Left back

Team information
- Current team: Vasco da Gama
- Number: 6

Youth career
- 2011–2019: Corinthians

Senior career*
Years	Team	Apps	(Gls)
2019–2022	Corinthians	81	(2)
2023–	Vasco da Gama	145	(5)
- * Club domestic league appearances and goals as of 8 April 2026

Lucas Piton Crivellaro (born 9 October 2000) is a professional footballer who plays as a left back for Vasco da Gama.

== Club career ==
On 28 December 2022, Piton was announced as a Vasco da Gama player ahead of the 2023 season, signing a four-year contract. He was officially presented on 6 January 2023. On his debut, he assisted Nenê for the opening goal in a 2–0 win against Portuguesa, earning comparisons from Vasco fans to former winger Felipe Maestro.

== International career ==
On 24 May 2023, Piton was called up to the Italy national team, being included in Roberto Mancini's provisional list to the 2023 UEFA Nations League semifinal against Spain.

== Career statistics ==
=== Club ===
As of 3 March 2026

Club	Season	League			State league		Cup (Note: Includes Copa do Brasil)		Continental		Other		Total	
Club	Season	Division	Apps	Goals	Apps	Goals	Apps	Goals	Apps	Goals	Apps	Goals	Apps	Goals
Corinthians	2019	Série A	1	0	0	0	0	0	—		—		1	0
Corinthians	2020	Série A	20	0	8 (Note: Appearances in the Campeonato Paulista)	0	2	0	2 (Note: Appearance(s) in Copa Libertadores)	0	—		32	0
Corinthians	2021	Série A	7	0	8	1	3	0	1 (Note: Appearance(s) in Copa Sudamericana)	0	—		16	1
Corinthians	2022	Série A	28	1	9	0	7	0	8	0	—		16	1
Corinthians	Total		56	1	25	1	12	0	11	0	0	0	104	2
Vasco da Gama	2023	Série A	37	0	10 (Note: Appearances in the Campeonato Carioca)	1	2	0	—		—		49	1
Vasco da Gama	2024	Série A	32	1	10	2	10	3	—		—		52	6
Vasco da Gama	2025	Série A	30	1	10	0	8	0	7	0	—		55	1
Vasco da Gama	2026	Série A	4	0	8	0	0	0	0	0	—		12	0
Vasco da Gama	Total		103	2	38	3	20	3	7	0	0	0	168	8
Career total			159	3	63	4	32	3	18	0	0	0	272	10
