= Roni (footballer, born 1999) =

Brazilian footballer

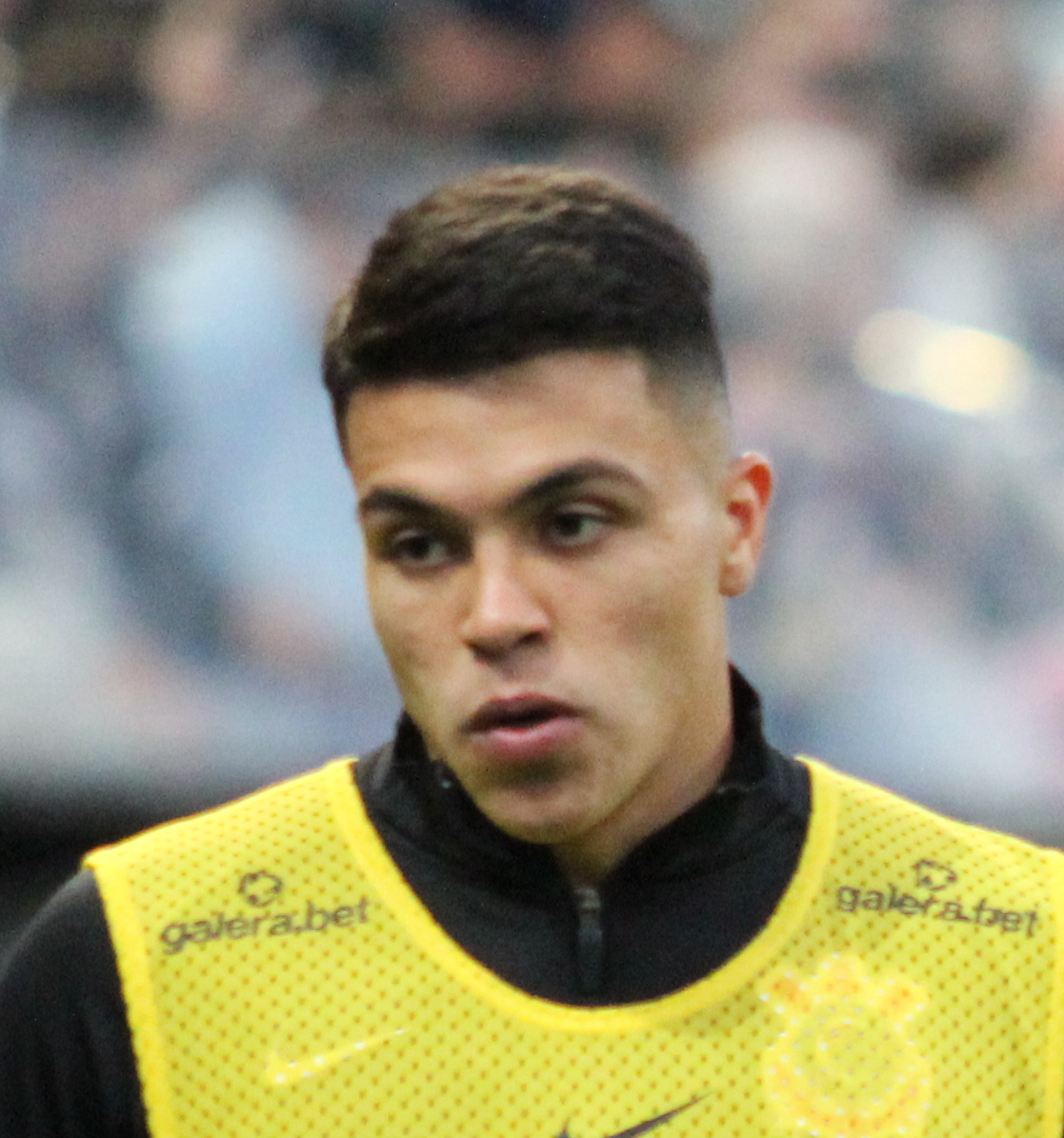
- Roni in 2022

Personal information
- Full name: Roni Medeiros de Moura
- Date of birth: 15 April 1999 (age 27)
- Place of birth: São Paulo, Brazil
- Height: 1.74 m (5 ft 9 in)
- Position: Midfielder

Team information
- Current team: AVS
- Number: 70

Youth career
- 2004–2020: Corinthians

Senior career*
Years	Team	Apps	(Gls)
2020–2024	Corinthians	87	(4)
2024	→ Atlético Goianiense (loan)	32	(2)
2025–2026	Mirassol	16	(0)
2026–	AVS	16	(2)
- * Club domestic league appearances and goals as of 25 May 2026

Roni Medeiros de Moura (born 15 April 1999), simply known as Roni, is a Brazilian professional footballer who plays as a midfielder for Liga Portugal 2 club AVS.

== Club career ==
=== Brazil ===
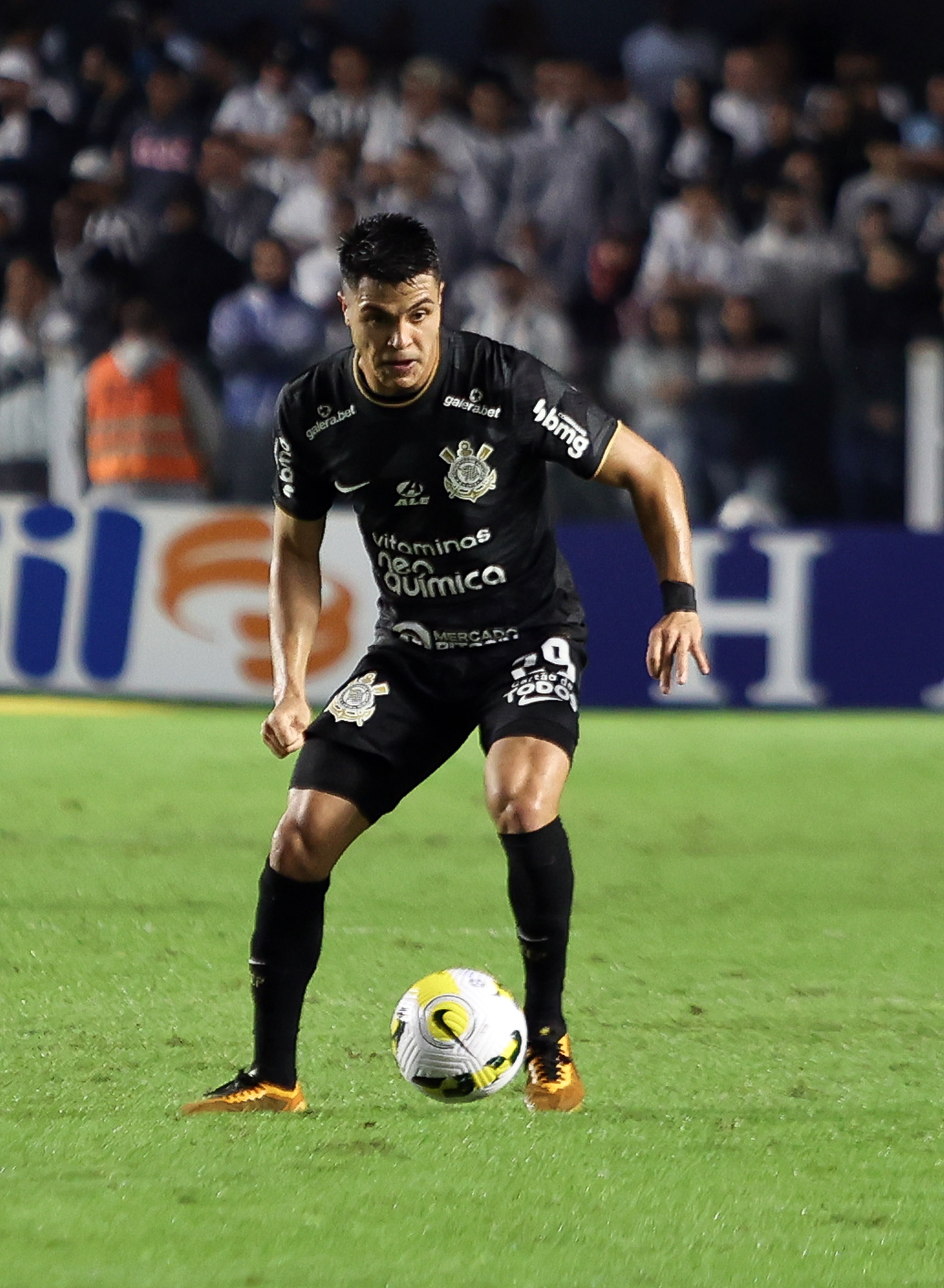
Roni in action for Corinthians in 2022

Roni started his career when he was 5 years old at Corinthians. He was part of the 2017 Copa São Paulo de Futebol Júnior squad that ended up as champion.

Coming through the youth system, Roni made his professional debut for Corinthians in a 2020 Campeonato Brasileiro Série A home match against Bahia on 16 September 2020, also scoring his first goal in the 3–2 win.

In January 2024, Roni was loaned to fellow Série A side Atlético Goianiense until the end of the season. At the end of that season, he was sold to recently-promoted Série A club Mirassol.

=== AVS ===
On 6 January 2026, Roni moved to Portugal, joining Primeira Liga club AVS on a contract until June 2028.

== Career statistics ==
=== Club ===
As of 23 March 2023

Appearances and goals by club, season and competition
Club	Season	League			State League (Note: Includes Campeonato Paulista)		National Cup (Note: Includes Copa do Brasil)		Continental		Other		Total	
Club	Season	Division	Apps	Goals	Apps	Goals	Apps	Goals	Apps	Goals	Apps	Goals	Apps	Goals
Corinthians	2020	Série A	9	1	0	0	0	0	0	0	—		9	1
Corinthians	2021	Série A	21	3	8	0	2	0	3 (Note: Appearance(s) in Copa Sudamericana)	0	—		34	3
Corinthians	2022	Série A	19	0	4	0	4	0	5 (Note: Appearance(s) in Copa Libertadores)	0	—		32	0
Corinthians	2023	Série A	0	0	11	0	0	0	0	0	—		11	0
Career total			49	4	23	0	6	0	8	0	0	0	86	4
