= Xavier (footballer, born 2000) =

Brazilian footballer

Personal information
- Full name: João Vitor Xavier de Almeida
- Date of birth: 2 March 2000 (age 26)
- Place of birth: Mococa, Brazil
- Height: 1.79 m (5 ft 10 in)
- Position: Midfielder

Team information
- Current team: Portimonense (on loan from Azuriz)
- Number: 15

Youth career
- –2017: Portuguesa Santista
- 2017–2019: Ponte Preta
- 2019–2020: Corinthians

Senior career*
Years	Team	Apps	(Gls)
2018–2019	Ponte Preta	3	(0)
2020–2023	Corinthians	43	(0)
2023	Avaí	17	(0)
2024–	Azuriz	31	(3)
2024	→ Ituano (loan)	11	(0)
2025–	→ Portimonense (loan)	22	(1)
- * Club domestic league appearances and goals as of 20 June 2026

João Vitor Xavier de Almeida (born 2 March 2000), commonly known as Xavier, is a Brazilian footballer who plays as a midfielder for Liga Portugal 2 club Portimonense on loan from Azuriz.

== Club career ==
Born in Mococa, São Paulo, Xavier joined Ponte Preta's youth setup in 2017, from Portuguesa Santista. He made his first team debut for Ponte on 6 March 2018, starting in a 0–1 Campeonato Paulista home loss against Bragantino.

On 21 January 2019, Xavier joined Corinthians on a four-year contract. He made his debut for the club on 17 September of the following year, starting in a 3–2 home win against Bahia for the Série A championship.

On 8 July 2025, Xavier moved to Portimonense in Portugal on loan with an option to buy, with an additional three-year contract in place if the option is exercised.

== Career statistics ==
As of 27 October 2021

Club	Season	League			State League		Cup		Continental		Other		Total	
Club	Season	Division	Apps	Goals	Apps	Goals	Apps	Goals	Apps	Goals	Apps	Goals	Apps	Goals
Ponte Preta	2018	Série B	0	0	3	0	0	0	—		—		3	0
Corinthians	2020	Série A	18	0	—		2	0	—		—		20	0
Corinthians	2021	Série A	12	0	3	0	0	0	2 (Note: Appearance(s) in Copa Sudamericana)	0	—		17	0
Corinthians	Total		30	0	3	0	2	0	2	0	—		37	0
Career total			30	0	6	0	2	0	2	0	0	0	40	0
