= Víctor Cantillo =

Colombian footballer (born 1993)

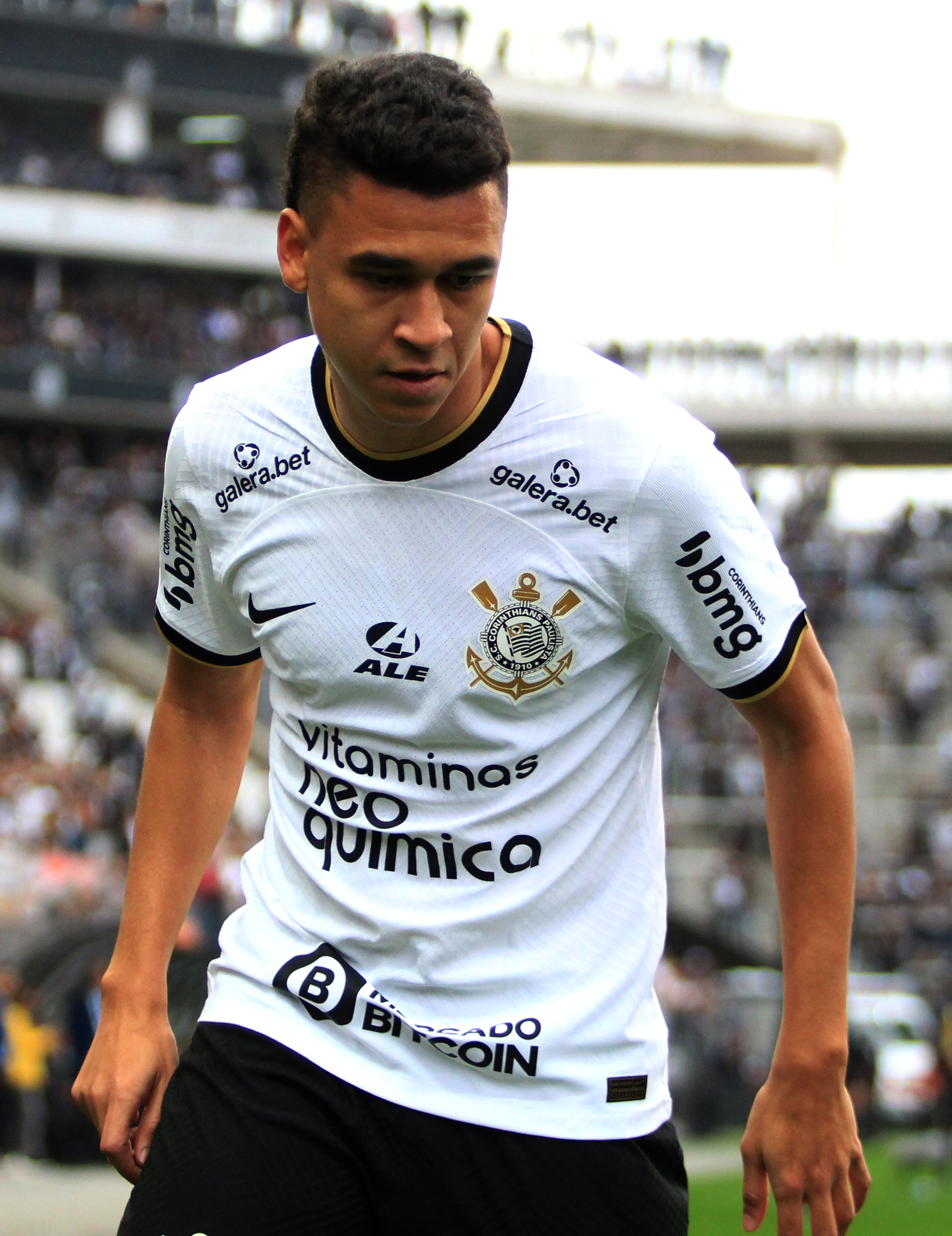
- Cantillo playing for Corinthians in 2022

Personal information
- Full name: Víctor Danilo Cantillo Jiménez
- Date of birth: 15 October 1993 (age 33)
- Place of birth: Río Frío, Colombia
- Height: 1.80 m (5 ft 11 in)
- Position: Defensive midfielder

Youth career
- Belén San Bernardo
- Atlético Nacional

Senior career*
Years	Team	Apps	(Gls)
2013–2017	Atlético Nacional	10	(0)
2014	→ Atlético Cali (loan)	14	(0)
2014–2016	→ Leones (loan)	87	(1)
2017	→ Deportivo Pasto (loan)	23	(0)
2017–2021	Junior	129	(4)
2020–2021	→ Corinthians (loan)	48	(0)
2021–2023	Corinthians	45	(2)
2024–2025	Junior	40	(0)
2025	Huracán	2	(0)
2025–2026	Remo	8	(0)

International career^{‡}
2021–	Colombia	2	(0)
- * Club domestic league appearances and goals as of 15 December 2025 ‡ National team caps and goals as of 2 February 2022

Víctor Danilo Cantillo Jiménez (born 15 October 1993) is a Colombian footballer who plays as a defensive midfielder

== Club career ==
Cantillo was born in Río Frío, Zona Bananera, Magdalena, and joined Atlético Nacional's youth setup in 2009, after representing CD Molino Viejo and CSyD Belén San Bernardo. He made his first team debut on 24 April 2013, starting in a 2–0 Copa Colombia away win against Rionegro Águilas.

Cantillo made his Categoría Primera A debut on 26 July 2013, playing the full 90 minutes in a 3–2 win at Atlético Huila. Rarely used during the season, he subsequently served loans at Categoría Primera B sides Atlético FC and Leones; with the latter side he scored his first senior goal, netting the equalizer in a 2–2 away draw against América de Cali on 26 September 2014.

On 7 January 2017, Cantillo joined Deportivo Pasto in the top tier, with a buyout clause. On 4 July, after impressing with the side, he signed for Junior from Pasto for a rumoured US$ 1.2 million fee, as the latter side exercised his buyout clause.

An immediate starter, Cantillo became a key unit for the side, winning the national cup and reaching the semifinals of the Copa Sudamericana; he also attracted interest from Udinese after the season ended.

On 9 January 2020, Cantillo joined Corinthians until 2023. He will be loaned until June 2021, when an obligation to buy clause will be activated.

== International career ==
On 16 March 2018, Cantillo was called up by national team manager José Pekerman for friendlies against France and Australia.

He made his debut on 16 November 2021 in a World Cup qualifier against Paraguay.

== Career statistics ==
=== Club ===
As of 23 March 2023

Club	Season	League			Cup		Continental		State League		Other		Total	
Club	Season	Division	Apps	Goals	Apps	Goals	Apps	Goals	Apps	Goals	Apps	Goals	Apps	Goals
Atlético Nacional	2013	Categoría Primera A	5	0	5	0	0	0	—		—		10	0
Atlético Cali (loan)	2014	Categoría Primera B	14	0	—		—		—		—		14	0
Leones (loan)	2014	Categoría Primera B	20	1	4	0	—		—		—		24	1
Leones (loan)	2015	Categoría Primera B	32	0	2	0	—		—		—		34	0
Leones (loan)	2016	Categoría Primera B	35	0	5	0	—		—		—		40	0
Leones (loan)	Subtotal		87	1	11	0	—		—		—		98	1
Deportivo Pasto (loan)	2017	Categoría Primera A	22	0	1	0	—		—		—		23	0
Atlético Junior	2017	Categoría Primera A	12	0	7	0	6 (Note: Appearance(s) in Copa Sudamericana)	0	—		—		25	0
Atlético Junior	2018	Categoría Primera A	24	1	2	0	18 (Note: Ten appearances in Copa Libertadores, eight appearances in Copa Sudamericana)	0	—		—		44	1
Atlético Junior	2019	Categoría Primera A	49	3	3	0	6 (Note: Appearance(s) in Copa Libertadores)	0	—		2 (Note: Appearance(s) in Superliga Colombiana)	0	60	3
Atlético Junior	Subtotal		85	4	12	0	30	0	—		2	0	129	4
Corinthians	2020	Série A	25	0	2	0	2	0	10 (Note: Appearance(s) in Campeonato Paulista)	0	—		39	0
Corinthians	2021	Série A	21	2	1	0	3	0	6	0	—		31	2
Corinthians	2022	Série A	19	0	4	0	4	0	7	0	—		34	0
Corinthians	2023	Série A	0	0	0	0	0	0	4	0	—		4	0
Corinthians	Subtotal		65	2	7	0	9	0	27	0	—		108	2
Total			278	7	36	0	39	0	27	0	2	0	382	7

=== International ===
As of 23 March 2023

Colombia
Year	Apps	Goals
2021	1	0
2022	1	0
Total	2	0
