= Gustavo Silva (footballer, born 1997) =

Brazilian footballer

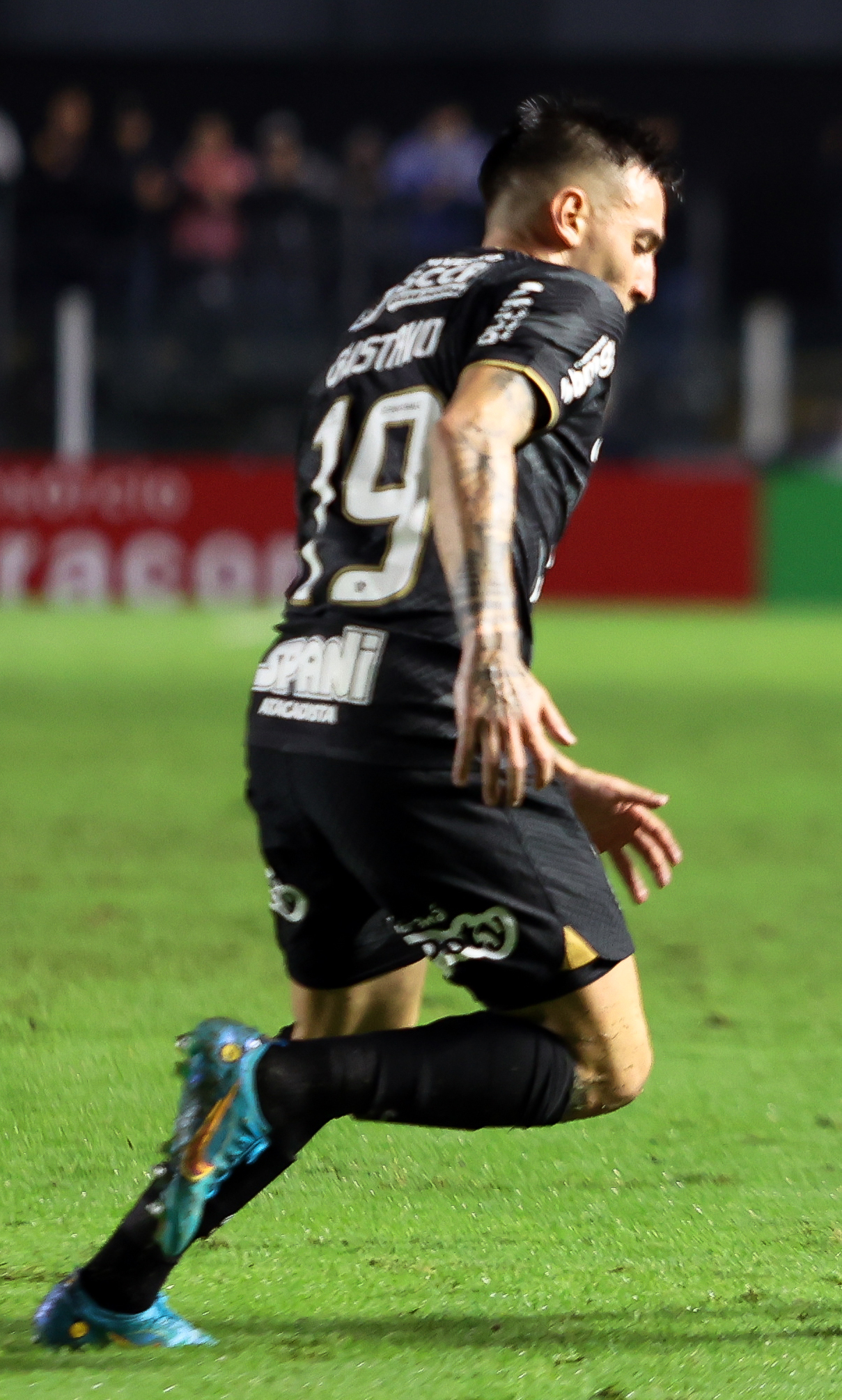
- Gustavo Silva playing for Corinthians in 2022

Personal information
- Full name: Gustavo Henric da Silva
- Date of birth: 7 September 1997 (age 29)
- Place of birth: Campo Largo, Brazil
- Height: 1.68 m (5 ft 6 in)
- Position: Forward

Team information
- Current team: Júbilo Iwata
- Number: 16

Youth career
- 2006–2018: Coritiba

Senior career*
Years	Team	Apps	(Gls)
2019–2024	Corinthians	135	(16)
2019	→ Vila Nova (loan)	7	(0)
2019	→ Oeste (loan)	3	(0)
2020	→ Paraná (loan)	13	(1)
2024–2025	Vitória	34	(3)
2025–	Júbilo Iwata	10	(3)
- * Club domestic league appearances and goals as of 1 January 2026

Gustavo Henric da Silva (born 7 September 1997), known as Gustavo Silva or Gustavo Mosquito, is a Brazilian professional footballer who plays for J2 League club Júbilo Iwata as a forward.

== Club career ==
Born at Campo Largo, Paraná, Silva joined the youth setup of Coritiba at the age of nine. On 2 May 2016, his contract was extended until September 2018. In 2017 Campeonato Brasileiro Sub-20, he scored 9 goals and became the top scorer of the season.

Ahead of the 2018 season, Silva was promoted to the senior team. On 8 October 2018, he signed with Corinthians until 2022. On 20 January 2019, he made his professional debut, coming on as a substitute in a 1–1 draw against São Caetano, in Paulista A1.

== Personal life ==
Upon joining Corinthians, Silva dropped his nickname "Mosquito". He said that he would like to be called as Gustavo or Gustavo Silva.

== Career statistics ==
As of 23 March 2023

Appearances and goals by club, season and competition
Club	Season	League			State League		National Cup		Continental		Other		Total	
Club	Season	Division	Apps	Goals	Apps	Goals	Apps	Goals	Apps	Goals	Apps	Goals	Apps	Goals
Corinthians	2019	Série A	0	0	5	0	0	0	0	0	—		5	0
Corinthians	2020	Série A	27	5	—		—		0	0	—		27	5
Corinthians	2021	Série A	37	2	9	2	3	0	4 (Note: Appearance(s) in Copa Sudamericana)	2	—		53	6
Corinthians	2022	Série A	22	3	13	2	8	0	7 (Note: Appearance(s) in Copa Libertadores)	0	—		50	5
Corinthians	2023	Série A	0	0	0	0	0	0	0	0	—		0	0
Corinthians	Total		86	10	27	4	11	0	11	2	—		135	16
Vila Nova (loan)	2019	Série B	6	0	—		1	0	—		—		7	0
Oeste (loan)	2019	Série B	3	0	—		—		—		—		3	0
Paraná (loan)	2020	Série B	2	1	9	0	2	0	—		—		13	1
Career total			97	11	36	4	13	0	11	0	0	0	158	17

== Honours ==
Corinthians

- Campeonato Paulista: 2019
