= Matheus Alexandre =

Brazilian footballer

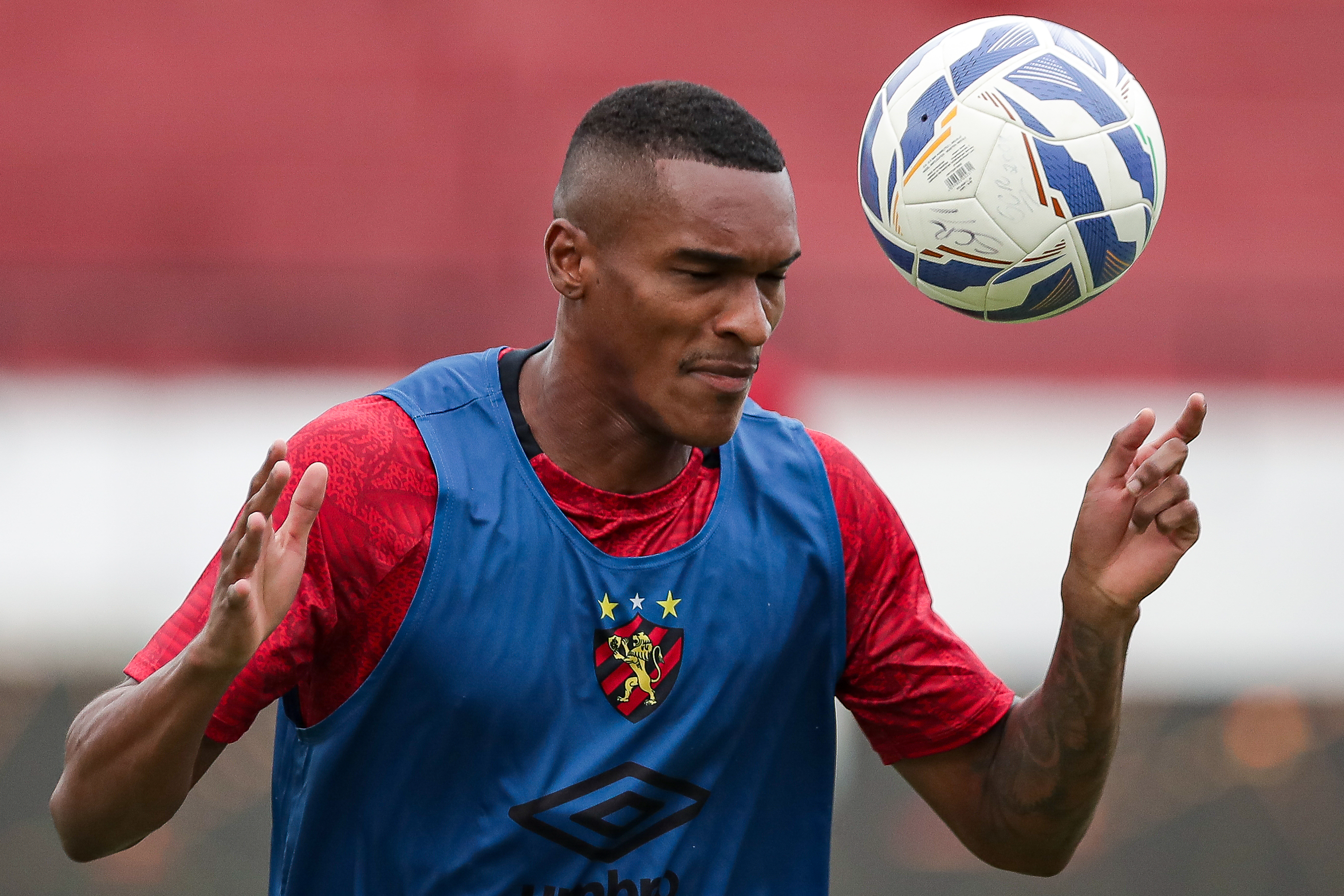

Personal information
- Full name: Matheus Alexandre Anastácio de Souza
- Date of birth: 7 April 1999 (age 27)
- Place of birth: Marília, Brazil
- Height: 1.88 m (6 ft 2 in)
- Position: Right-back

Team information
- Current team: Remo (on loan from Sport Recife)
- Number: 2

Youth career
- 2014–2018: Marília
- 2018–2019: Ponte Preta
- 2019–2021: Corinthians
- 2019–2020: → Ponte Preta (loan)

Senior career*
Years	Team	Apps	(Gls)
2018	Marília	13	(0)
2018–2019	Ponte Preta	3	(0)
2019–2022	Corinthians	0	(0)
2019–2020	→ Ponte Preta (loan)	4	(0)
2021	→ Inter de Limeira (loan)	8	(0)
2021–2022	→ Coritiba (loan)	36	(0)
2023–2025	Cuiabá	102	(3)
2025–	Sport Recife	34	(0)
2026–	→ Remo (loan)	1	(0)
- * Club domestic league appearances and goals as of 9 April 2026

Matheus Alexandre Anastácio de Souza (born 7 April 1999), known as Matheus Alexandre, is a Brazilian footballer who plays for Remo, on loan from Sport Recife. Mainly a right-back, he also can play as a defensive midfielder.

== Career ==
=== Early career ===
Born in Marília, São Paulo, Matheus Alexandre began his career with hometown side Marília AC. After impressing in the 2018 Copa São Paulo de Futebol Júnior, he was promoted to the first team, and made his senior debut on 17 January of that year, coming on as a second-half substitute in a 2–2 Campeonato Paulista Série A3 home draw against Barretos.

Regularly used as a defensive midfielder as the club suffered relegation, Matheus Alexandre moved to Ponte Preta shortly after, returning to youth football.

=== Corinthians and loans ===
On 17 April 2019, after three first-team matches with Ponte, Matheus Alexandre was transferred to Corinthians for a rumoured fee of R$ 800,000; he remained on loan at Ponte Preta until the end of the year. On 20 December, despite being rarely used, his loan was renewed for a further year.

Matheus Alexandre featured in just one match for Ponte during the 2020 season, before being assigned to an under-23 squad for the year's Copa Paulista in October. On 4 January 2021, he moved to Inter de Limeira also in a temporary deal.

Regularly used in the 2021 Campeonato Paulista, Matheus Alexandre missed the quarterfinals match after not being allowed to play against his parent club. He returned to Timão in June of that year, but failed to make an appearance for the club before moving out on loan to Coritiba on 23 September.

Despite acting mainly as a backup to Natanael, Matheus Alexandre's loan was extended for a further year in December 2021. He then became a starter during part of the 2022 campaign, but left in November after his loan was about to expire.

=== Cuiabá ===
On 30 December 2022, Matheus Alexandre agreed to a three-year contract with Cuiabá also in the top tier, with Corinthians and Ponte Preta also retaining a part of the player's economic rights. He immediately became a first-choice at his new side, and scored his first professional goal on 1 April 2023, netting his team's fourth in a 5–0 Campeonato Mato-Grossense home routing of Luverdense.

== Career statistics ==
As of 1 January 2025

Club	Season	League			State League		Cup		Continental		Other		Total	
Club	Season	Division	Apps	Goals	Apps	Goals	Apps	Goals	Apps	Goals	Apps	Goals	Apps	Goals
Marília	2018	Paulista A3	—		13	0	—		—		—		13	0
Ponte Preta	2018	Série B	0	0	—		—		—		—		0	0
Corinthians	2019	Série A	0	0	0	0	0	0	0	0	—		0	0
Corinthians	2021	Série A	0	0	—		0	0	0	0	—		0	0
Corinthians	Total		0	0	0	0	0	0	0	0	—		0	0
Ponte Preta (loan)	2019	Série B	3	0	3	0	—		—		—		6	0
Ponte Preta (loan)	2020	Série B	0	0	1	0	0	0	—		7 (Note: Appearance(s) in Copa Paulista)	1	8	1
Ponte Preta (loan)	Total		3	0	4	0	0	0	—		7	1	14	1
Inter de Limeira (loan)	2021	Paulista	—		8	0	—		—		—		8	0
Coritiba (loan)	2021	Série B	3	0	—		—		—		—		3	0
Coritiba (loan)	2022	Série A	21	0	12	0	2	0	—		—		35	0
Coritiba (loan)	Total		24	0	12	0	2	0	—		—		38	0
Cuiabá	2023	Série A	35	1	10	1	1	0	—		5 (Note: Appearance(s) in Copa Verde)	0	51	2
Cuiabá	2024	Série A	31	1	8	0	4	0	5 (Note: Appearance(s) in Copa Sudamericana)	0	3	0	51	1
Cuiabá	Total		66	2	18	0	5	0	5	0	8	0	102	3
Career total			93	2	55	1	7	0	5	0	15	1	175	4

== Honours ==
Cuiabá

- Campeonato Mato-Grossense: 2023, 2024
