= Marquinhos (footballer, born January 1997) =

Brazilian footballer

Personal information
- Full name: Marcos Vinícius Sousa Natividade
- Date of birth: 26 January 1997 (age 29)
- Place of birth: Benevides, Brazil
- Height: 1.74 m (5 ft 9 in)
- Position: Winger

Team information
- Current team: APOEL
- Number: 10

Youth career
- Castanhal
- 2011: Santos
- 2011–2013: Castanhal
- 2013: Noroeste
- 2014: Portuguesa
- 2014–2017: Corinthians
- 2015–2016: → Flamengo-SP (loan)

Senior career*
Years	Team	Apps	(Gls)
2018–2021	Corinthians	10	(0)
2018	→ Bangu (loan)	4	(0)
2018	→ Bragantino (loan)	16	(2)
2019	→ Ponte Preta (loan)	25	(2)
2020–2021	→ Sport Recife (loan)	32	(3)
2021	→ Sport Recife (loan)	5	(0)
2022	Cuiabá	15	(1)
2022–	APOEL	115	(26)
- * Club domestic league appearances and goals as of 10 November 2026

Marcos Vinícius Sousa Natividade (born 26 January 1997), known as Marquinhos, is a Brazilian professional footballer who plays as a winger for Cypriot First Division club APOEL.

== Club career ==
Born in Benevides, Pará, Marquinhos began his career with local side Castanhal. He then enjoyed youth spells at Santos, Noroeste and Portuguesa before joining Corinthians in 2014. Initially having little playing time, he was loaned to Flamengo-SP before returning in 2017 and establishing himself with the under-20s.

On 2 March 2018, after finishing his formation, Marquinhos was loaned to Bangu for the 2018 Campeonato Carioca. He made his debut for the club the following day, starting in a 1–1 home draw against Portuguesa-RJ.

Rarely used at Bangu, Marquinhos moved to Bragantino in the Série C on 1 May 2018, also in a temporary deal. He became a regular starter for the club, helping in their promotion to Série B before returning to Timão for the 2019 campaign.

On 13 May 2019, Marquinhos was loaned to Ponte Preta until December. The following 1 January, after playing regularly, he agreed to a one-year loan deal with Sport Recife in the Série A; he also renewed his contract with his parent club until December 2022.

Marquinhos made his top tier debut on 8 August 2020, starting in a 3–2 home win against Ceará. He scored his first goal in the category on 6 September, netting the winner in a 2–1 home success over Goiás.

== Career statistics ==
As of 23 November 2020

Club	Season	League			State League		Cup		Continental		Other		Total	
Club	Season	Division	Apps	Goals	Apps	Goals	Apps	Goals	Apps	Goals	Apps	Goals	Apps	Goals
Corinthians	2018	Série A	0	0	—		—		—		—		0	0
Corinthians	2019	Série A	0	0	0	0	0	0	—		—		0	0
Corinthians	2020	Série A	0	0	—		—		—		—		0	0
Corinthians	Total		0	0	0	0	0	0	—		—		0	0
Bangu (loan)	2018	Carioca	—		4	0	—		—		—		4	0
Bragantino (loan)	2018	Série C	16	2	—		—		—		4 (Note: Appearance (s) in Copa Paulista)	0	20	2
Ponte Preta (loan)	2019	Série B	25	2	—		—		—		—		25	2
Sport Recife (loan)	2020	Série A	19	2	8	2	1	0	—		7 (Note: Appearance (s) in Copa do Nordeste)	2	35	6
Career total			60	6	12	2	1	0	0	0	11	2	84	10

== Honours ==
APOEL

- Cypriot First Division: 2023–24
