= Fabrício Oya =

Brazilian footballer (born 1999)

Personal information
- Full name: Fabrício Keiske Rodrigues Oya
- Date of birth: 23 July 1999 (age 27)
- Place of birth: Campinas, Brazil
- Height: 1.74 m (5 ft 9 in)
- Position: Midfielder

Team information
- Current team: Confiança

Youth career
- 2015–2019: Corinthians

Senior career*
Years	Team	Apps	(Gls)
2019–2021	Corinthians	1	(0)
2019	→ São Bento (loan)	9	(1)
2020	→ Oeste (loan)	18	(0)
2021–2022	Torpedo-BelAZ Zhodino	14	(1)
2022	→ Azuriz (loan)	13	(1)
2023–2024	Azuriz	18	(1)
2023	→ Caxias (loan)	6	(0)
2024	Primavera	0	(0)
2025	Santo André	15	(0)
2025	Itabaiana	15	(1)
2026–	Confiança	18	(0)

International career^{‡}
2017	Brazil U20	3	(0)
- * Club domestic league appearances and goals as of 11 November 2026 ‡ National team caps and goals as of 18:02, 16 June 2019 (UTC)

Fabrício Keiske Rodrigues Oya (born 23 July 1999), commonly known as Fabrício Oya, is a Brazilian footballer who currently plays as a midfielder for Confiança.

== Career ==
Oya was included in The Guardian's "Next Generation 2016".

== Personal life ==
Born in Brazil, Oya is of Japanese descent.

=== Club statistics ===
As of 19 January 2021.

Club	Season	League			State League		Cup		Other		Total	
Club	Season	Division	Apps	Goals	Apps	Goals	Apps	Goals	Apps	Goals	Apps	Goals
Corinthians	2019	Série A	0	0	1 (Note: Appearances in the Campeonato Paulista)	0	0	0	0	0	1	0
Corinthians	2020	Série A	0	0	0	0	0	0	0	0	0	0
Corinthians	2021	Série A	0	0	0	0	0	0	0	0	0	0
Corinthians	Total		0	0	1	0	0	0	0	0	1	0
São Bento (loan)	2019	Série B	9	1	0	0	0	0	0	0	9	1
Oeste (loan)	2020	Série B	13	0	5	0	1 (Note: Appearances in the Copa do Brasil)	0	0	0	19	0
Career total			22	1	6	0	1	0	0	0	29	1
