= Cauê (footballer, born 2002) =

Brazilian footballer

Personal information
- Full name: Cauê Vinícius dos Santos
- Date of birth: 16 November 2002 (age 23)
- Place of birth: Ituverava, Brazil
- Height: 1.84 m (6 ft 0 in)
- Position: Striker

Team information
- Current team: Criciúma
- Number: 88

Youth career
- 2016–2019: Novorizontino
- 2019–2022: → Corinthians (loan)

Senior career*
Years	Team	Apps	(Gls)
2019–2022	Novorizontino	1	(0)
2020–2022	→ Corinthians (loan)	9	(1)
2022–2025	Lommel	41	(15)
2023–2024	→ Benfica B (loan)	28	(7)
2024–2025	→ Gil Vicente (loan)	15	(1)
2025	→ Casa Pia (loan)	12	(1)
2025–	Criciúma	1	(0)

International career^{‡}
2020	Brazil U20	3	(2)
- * Club domestic league appearances and goals as of 7 September 2025 ‡ National team caps and goals as of 30 August 2023

Cauê Vinicius dos Santos (born 16 November 2002), known simply as Cauê, is a Brazilian professional footballer who plays as a striker for Criciúma.

== Club career ==
Born in Ituverava, Cauê started playing football in the local club Novorizontino. Cauê made his professional debut for Novorizontino on 21 March 2019 in the Campeonato Paulista.

He later signed for Corinthians. He became part-time with the professional squad in September 2020.

In January 2022, Cauê joined Belgian First Division B side Lommel on a five-year deal.

On 30 August 2023, Portuguese club Benfica announced that Cauê had joined their B team on a season-long loan from Lommel.
