= Rafael Bilú =

Brazilian association football player

Personal information
- Full name: Rafael Bilú Mudesto
- Date of birth: 21 April 1999 (age 27)
- Place of birth: São Paulo, Brazil
- Height: 1.74 m (5 ft 8 1/2 in)
- Position: Winger

Team information
- Current team: Ratchaburi

Youth career
- 2012–2018: Corinthians

Senior career*
Years	Team	Apps	(Gls)
2018–2021	Corinthians	1	(0)
2019	→ América Mineiro (loan)	10	(1)
2020–2021	→ CSA (loan)	31	(4)
2021	→ Mirassol (loan)	1	(0)
2021	→ Juventude (loan)	5	(0)
2022	Criciúma	21	(1)
2023–2024	Cruzeiro	11	(0)
2024	CRB	15	(0)
2025	Guarani	16	(3)
2025	Juventude	15	(1)
2026	Avaí	5	(1)
2026–	Ratchaburi	0	(0)
- * Club domestic league appearances and goals as of 15 April 2026

Rafael Bilú Mudesto (born 21 April 1999), known as Rafael Bilú, is a Brazilian footballer who plays as a winger for Thai League 1 club Ratchaburi.

== Career ==
Rafael Bilú came through the youth ranks at Corinthians. He represented the club in both 2018 and 2019 editions of Copa São Paulo de Futebol Júnior. On 25 November 2018, he made his senior debut in the Campeonato Brasileiro Série A game against Chapecoense, coming on as a late substitute in the 0–0 draw.

On 22 May 2019, he moved on loan to América Mineiro until the end of the 2019 season.
