= 2019 Sport Club Corinthians Paulista season =

Corinthians
2019 season
- President: Andrés Sánchez
- Manager: Fábio Carille (until November 3); Dyego Coelho (interim, from November 4)
- Stadium: Arena Corinthians
- Série A: 8th
- Copa do Brasil: Round of 16
- Campeonato Paulista: Winners
- Copa Sudamericana: Semi-finals
- Top goalscorer: League: Mauro Boselli (7); All: Gustavo (14)
- Highest home attendance: 46,903 vs São Paulo (21 April)
- Lowest home attendance: 17,701 vs Avaí (27 November)
- Average home league attendance: 33,115
Home colors	Away colors	Third colors

The 2019 season was the 110th season in the history of Sport Club Corinthians Paulista.

== Background ==
=== Sponsorship ===
On January 17, Corinthians announced Banco BMG as their new main sponsor.

=== Kit ===
- Home (May 2019 onward): White shirt, black shorts and white socks;
- Away (May 2019 onward): Black shirt, white shorts and black socks;
- Third (September 2019 onward): Black and white shirt, black shorts and black socks.

=== Previous Kits ===
- Home (Until April 2019): White shirt, black shorts and white socks.
- Away (Until May 2019): Black shirt, white shorts and black socks;
- Third (Until August 2019): Black and gold shirt, black shorts and black socks.

=== Squad ===
As of 3 October 2019

Note: Flags indicate national team as defined under FIFA eligibility rules; some limited exceptions apply. Players may hold more than one non-FIFA nationality.

No.	Pos.	Nation	Player
1	GK	BRA	Caíque França
2	DF	BRA	Michel Macedo
4	DF	BRA	Manoel (on loan from Cruzeiro)
5	MF	BRA	Gabriel
6	DF	BRA	Carlos Augusto
7	MF	ECU	Junior Sornoza
8	MF	BRA	Renê Júnior
9	FW	BRA	Vágner Love
10	MF	BRA	Jádson
11	MF	BRA	Júnior Urso
12	GK	BRA	Cássio
13	DF	BRA	Marllon
14	DF	URU	Bruno Méndez
15	MF	BRA	Ralf
17	FW	ARG	Mauro Boselli

No.	Pos.	Nation	Player
18	MF	BRA	Matheus Jesus (on loan from Estoril)
19	FW	BRA	Gustavo
20	MF	BRA	Régis (on loan from Bahia)
22	MF	BRA	Mateus Vital
23	DF	BRA	Fagner
25	FW	BRA	Clayson
26	DF	BRA	Gil
27	GK	BRA	Walter
28	MF	BRA	Ramiro
31	MF	BRA	Janderson
35	DF	BRA	Danilo Avelar
36	DF	BRA	Lucas Piton
37	FW	BRA	Everaldo
38	MF	BRA	Pedrinho
40	GK	BRA	Filipe

=== Managerial changes ===
On December 3, one day after the 2018 season ended, it was announced that Jair Ventura was fired from the club. Four days later Fábio Carille was announced as the new manager, just seven months after he left to train Saudi club Al-Wehda.

On November 3, 2019, Carille was fired after a loss to Flamengo. The club announced the following day that Dyego Coelho, former player and current U20 manager, would take over as interim until the end of the season.

On November 7, it was announced that Athletico Paranaense's manager Tiago Nunes will be the head coach for the next season.

Manager	Signed from	Date of signing	Date of departure	Signed with	Source
(Brazil) Jair Ventura	Free agent	6 September 2018	3 December 2018	–	
(Brazil) Fábio Carille	(Saudi Arabia) Al-Wehda	7 December 2018	3 November 2019	–	
(Brazil) Dyego Coelho	Corinthians U20 head coach (interim)	4 November 2019	–	–	
(Brazil) Tiago Nunes	(Brazil) Athletico Paranaense	7 November 2019 (Note: Tiago Nunes will become the head coach for the 2020 season.)	–	–	

=== Transfers ===
==== Transfers in ====
#	Position:	Player	Transferred from	Fee	Date	Team	Source
2	DF	(Brazil) Michel Macedo	Free agent	Free transfer	8 October 2018	First team	
32	FW	(Brazil) Gustavo Silva	(Brazil) Coritiba	Free transfer (End of contract)	8 October 2018	First team	
29	FW	(Brazil) André Luis	(Brazil) Cianorte	Undisclosed	6 December 2018	First team	
26	MF	(Brazil) Richard	(Brazil) Fluminense	Undisclosed	10 December 2018	First team	
28	MF	(Brazil) Ramiro	(Brazil) Grêmio	Undisclosed	13 December 2018	First team	
17	FW	(Argentina) Mauro Boselli	(Mexico) León	Free transfer (Rescinded contract)	4 January 2019	First team	
7	MF	(Ecuador) Junior Sornoza	(Brazil) Fluminense	R$10,000,000	8 January 2019	First team	
9	FW	(Brazil) Vágner Love	(Turkey) Beşiktaş	Free transfer (Rescinded contract)	25 January 2019	First team	
30	MF	(Brazil) Júnior Urso	(China) Guangzhou R&F	Free transfer (Rescinded contract)	4 February 2019	First team	
14	DF	(Uruguay) Bruno Méndez	(Uruguay) Montevideo Wanderers	U$3,500,000 (~R$13,000,000)	28 February 2019	First team	
20	MF	(Brazil) Thiaguinho	(Brazil) Nacional-SP	Undisclosed (Note: Thiaguinho was already on loan since April 2018 until May 2019.)	3 April 2019	First team	
	DF	(Brazil) Matheus Alexandre	(Brazil) Ponte Preta	R$800,000	26 April 2019	First team	
37	FW	(Brazil) Everaldo	(Brazil) Velo Clube	R$2,500,000	22 May 2019	First team	
26	DF	(Brazil) Gil	(China) Shandong Luneng	Free transfer (Rescinded contract)	3 July 2019	First team	
35	DF	(Brazil) Danilo Avelar	(Italy) Torino	€1,500,000 (~R$6,500,000) (Note: Danilo Avelar was already on loan since June 2018 until July 2019.)	18 July 2019	First team	
	MF	(Colombia) Juan David Torres	(Argentina) Banfield	Undisclosed	22 July 2019	Academy	
16	MF	(Chile) Ángelo Araos	Universidad de Chile	~R$20,600,000 (Note: Ángelo Araos was already on loan since July 2018 until July 2019 with an obligation to buy.)	8 August 2019	First team	

==== Loans in ====
#	Position	Player	Loaned from	Date	Loan expires	Team	Source
4	DF	(Brazil) Manoel	(Brazil) Cruzeiro	16 January 2019	31 December 2019	First team	
	FW	(Paraguay) Hugo Sandoval	(Paraguay) 3 de Febrero	13 February 2019	31 December 2019	Academy	
18	MF	(Brazil) Régis	(Brazil) Bahia	1 March 2019	31 December 2019	First team	
18	MF	(Brazil) Matheus Jesus	(Portugal) Estoril	9 May 2019	31 December 2019 (Note: Loan with an obligation to buy.)	First team	

==== Transfers out ====
#	Position	Player	Transferred to	Fee	Date	Team	Source
47	FW	(Qatar) Emerson Sheik	Retired		3 December 2018	First team	
	DF	(Brazil) Rodrigo Sam	(Brazil) Água Santa	Free transfer (End of contract)	17 December 2018	First team	
20	MF	(Brazil) Danilo	(Brazil) Vila Nova	Free transfer (End of contract)	24 December 2018	First team	
	FW	(Turkey) Colin Kazim-Richards	(Mexico) Veracruz	Free transfer (End of contract)	26 December 2018	First team	
37	DF	(Brazil) Vilson	Retired		1 January 2019	First team	
	GK	(Brazil) Matheus Vidotto	(Brazil) Figueirense	Free transfer (End of contract)	1 January 2019	First team	
7	FW	(Brazil) Jonathas	(Germany) Hannover 96	Loan canceled	15 January 2019	First team	
	MF	(Brazil) Marquinhos Gabriel	(Brazil) Cruzeiro	Free transfer (Rescinded contract)	18 January 2019	First team	
	DF	(Brazil) Moisés	(Brazil) Bahia	R$2,000,000	18 January 2019	First team	
9	FW	(Brazil) Roger	(Brazil) Ceará	Free transfer (Rescinded contract)	18 January 2019	First team	
	DF	(Brazil) Franklin	(Croatia) NK Lokomotiva	Free transfer (End of contract)	11 February 2019	Academy	
	MF	(Brazil) Serginho	(United States) Orlando City	Undisclosed	12 February 2019	Academy	
	DF	(Brazil) Juninho Capixaba	(Brazil) Grêmio	Undisclosed (~R$4,000,000)	16 May 2019	First Team	
21	FW	(Paraguay) Sergio Díaz	(Spain) Real Madrid	Loan canceled	21 June 2019	First team	
	MF	(Brazil) Douglas	(Greece) PAOK	€3,000,000 (~R$13,000,000)	1 July 2019	First team	
	MF	(Brazil) Renan Areias	Free agent	End of contract	1 July 2019	Academy	
11	FW	(Paraguay) Ángel Romero	(Argentina) San Lorenzo	Free transfer (End of contract)	14 July 2019	First team	
	FW	(Brazil) Junior Dutra	Free agent	Rescinded contract	16 July 2019	First team	
	FW	(Brazil) Bruno Paulo	(Brazil) Brasil de Pelotas	Free transfer (End of contract)	1 August 2019	First team	
3	DF	(Brazil) Henrique	(United Arab Emirates) Al-Ittihad Kalba	Free transfer (Rescinded contract)	15 August 2019	First team	

==== Loans out ====
#	Position	Player	Loaned to	Date	Loan expires	Team	Source
29	FW	(Brazil) Matheus Matias	(Brazil) Ceará	11 December 2018	31 December 2019 (Canceled on 10 April 2019)	First team	
	DF	(Brazil) Guilherme Romão	(Brazil) São Bento	13 December 2018	31 December 2019	First team	
	MF	(Brazil) Marciel	(Brazil) Oeste	18 December 2018	31 December 2019 (Canceled on 15 May 2019)	First team	
28	MF	(Brazil) Paulo Roberto	(Brazil) Fortaleza	18 December 2018	31 December 2019	First team	
2	MF	(Brazil) Guilherme Mantuan	(Brazil) Ponte Preta	18 December 2018	31 December 2019 (Canceled on 20 September 2019)	First team	
	DF	(Brazil) Yago	(Brazil) Goiás	20 December 2018	31 December 2019	First team	
32	MF	(Brazil) Rodrigo Figueiredo	(Brazil) Joinville	21 December 2018	30 April 2019	First team	
	FW	(Brazil) Carlinhos	(Brazil) Novorizontino	22 December 2018	31 December 2019	First team	
	FW	(Brazil) Gabriel Vasconcelos	(Brazil) Oeste	26 December 2018	31 December 2019	First team	
1	GK	(Brazil) Caíque França	(Brazil) Oeste	26 December 2018	30 April 2019 (Canceled on 15 January 2019)	First team	
	FW	(Brazil) Luidy	(Brazil) Londrina	28 December 2018	31 December 2019 (Canceled on 27 May 2019)	First team	
	MF	(Brazil) Fellipe Bastos	(Brazil) Vasco da Gama	2 January 2019	31 December 2019	First team	
	MF	(Brazil) Camacho	(Brazil) Athletico Paranaense	3 January 2019	31 December 2019	First team	
	MF	(Brazil) Marlone	(Brazil) Goiás	3 January 2019	31 December 2019	First team	
	MF	(Brazil) Guilherme	(Brazil) Bahia	3 January 2019	31 December 2019 (Canceled on 1 May 2019)	First team	
	MF	(Brazil) Jean	(Brazil) Botafogo	5 January 2019	31 December 2019	First team	
	DF	(Brazil) Vinicius Del'Amore	(Brazil) Oeste	8 January 2019	30 April 2019	First team	
	DF	(Brazil) Léo Príncipe	(Brazil) Guarani	11 January 2019	31 December 2019 (Canceled on 2 July 2019)	First team	
	FW	(Brazil) Junior Dutra	(United Arab Emirates) Al-Nasr	11 January 2019	30 June 2019	First team	
	FW	(Brazil) Bruno Paulo	(Brazil) Brasil de Pelotas	17 January 2019	31 July 2019	First team	
30	MF	(Brazil) Douglas	(Brazil) Bahia	20 January 2019	31 December 2019 (Canceled on 1 July 2019)	First team	
	MF	(Brazil) Warian	(Brazil) CRB	05 February 2019	31 December 2019 (Canceled on 27 May 2019)	First team	
14	DF	(Brazil) Léo Santos	(Brazil) Fluminense	27 February 2019	31 December 2019 (Canceled on 1 August 2019)	First team	
	MF	(Brazil) Giovanni Augusto	(Brazil) Goiás	12 March 2019	31 December 2019	First team	
	DF	(Brazil) Matheus Alexandre	(Brazil) Ponte Preta	27 April 2019	31 December 2019	First team	
	FW	(Brazil) Matheus Matias	(Brazil) Avaí	30 April 2019	31 December 2019	First team	
32	MF	(Brazil) Gustavo Silva	(Brazil) Vila Nova	1 May 2019	31 December 2019 (Canceled on 29 July 2019)	First team	
	MF	(Brazil) Guilherme	(Brazil) Fluminense	1 May 2019	31 December 2019	First team	
20	MF	(Brazil) Thiaguinho	(Brazil) Oeste	6 May 2019	31 December 2019	First team	
29	FW	(Brazil) André Luis	(Brazil) Fortaleza	8 May 2019	31 December 2019	First team	
33	MF	(Brazil) Marquinhos	(Brazil) Ponte Preta	13 May 2019	31 December 2019	First team	
	MF	(Brazil) Marciel	(Brazil) Vitória	15 May 2019	31 December 2019	First team	
	MF	(Brazil) Rafael Bilú	(Brazil) América Mineiro	22 May 2019	31 December 2019	Academy	
39	MF	(Brazil) Fabrício Oya	(Brazil) São Bento	22 May 2019	31 December 2019 (Canceled on 24 October 2019)	First team	
26	MF	(Brazil) Richard	(Brazil) Vasco da Gama	20 June 2019	31 December 2019	First team	
34	DF	(Brazil) Pedro Henrique	(Brazil) Athletico Paranaense	29 June 2019	31 December 2019	First team	
	DF	(Brazil) Léo Príncipe	(Brazil) Paraná	2 July 2019	31 December 2019	First team	
	DF	(Brazil) Caetano	(Brazil) Oeste	3 July 2019	31 December 2019	Academy	
13	DF	(Brazil) Marllon	(Brazil) Bahia	5 July 2019	31 December 2019 (Canceled on 12 September 2019)	First team	
	FW	(Brazil) Lucca	(Brazil) Bahia	19 July 2019	31 July 2020	First team	
16	MF	(Chile) Ángelo Araos	(Brazil) Ponte Preta	3 October 2019	31 December 2019	First team	

== Squad statistics ==
No.	Pos.	Name	Campeonato Paulista		Copa Sudamericana		Campeonato Brasileiro		Copa do Brasil		Total		Discipline	
No.	Pos.	Name	Apps	Goals	Apps	Goals	Apps	Goals	Apps	Goals	Apps	Goals	Yellow card	Red card
1	GK	(Brazil) Caíque França	0	0	0	0	0 (1)	0	0	0	0 (1)	0	0	0
2	DF	(Brazil) Michel Macedo	5	0	0 (1)	0	9 (1)	1	2 (1)	0	16 (3)	1	3	1
3	DF	(Brazil) Henrique	14	1	5	0	5	0	7	1	31	2	5	0
4	DF	(Brazil) Manoel	11	2	8	0	31	1	6	0	56	3	2	0
5	MF	(Brazil) Gabriel	1	0	5	0	16 (1)	0	0	0	22 (1)	0	7	0
6	DF	(Brazil) Carlos Augusto	2	0	2	0	13 (2)	1	2	0	19 (2)	1	2	0
7	MF	(Ecuador) Junior Sornoza	11 (1)	0	5 (1)	1	17 (3)	0	8	0	41 (5)	1	7	0
8	MF	(Brazil) Renê Júnior	0	0	0	0	0 (1)	0	0	0	0 (1)	0	0	0
9	FW	(Brazil) Vágner Love	7 (6)	1	9 (1)	4	18 (10)	5	6 (2)	1	40 (19)	11	7	0
10	MF	(Brazil) Jádson	7 (3)	0	3 (2)	0	6 (12)	0	3 (2)	1	19 (19)	1	4	0
11	MF	(Brazil) Júnior Urso	10	1	6 (2)	1	26 (1)	3	4 (1)	2	46 (4)	7	6	0
12	GK	(Brazil) Cássio	18	0	10	0	32	0	7	0	67	0	8	1
13	DF	(Brazil) Marllon	6	0	1	0	4	0	2	0	13	0	1	0
14	DF	(Brazil) Léo Santos	3	0	0	0	0	0	0	0	3	0	0	0
14	DF	(Uruguay) Bruno Méndez	0	0	0	0	5 (1)	0	0	0	5 (1)	0	3	0
15	MF	(Brazil) Ralf	13	0	5	0	22 (1)	1	7 (1)	0	47 (2)	1	1	0
16	MF	(Chile) Ángelo Araos	2	0	0	0	0	0	0	0	2	0	0	0
17	FW	(Argentina) Mauro Boselli	7 (4)	1	1 (3)	1	16 (6)	7	4 (4)	1	28 (17)	10	5	0
18	MF	(Brazil) Matheus Jesus	0	0	1 (2)	0	2 (4)	0	0	0	3 (6)	0	1	0
19	FW	(Brazil) Gustavo	10 (5)	4	2 (6)	2	9 (16)	5	3 (1)	3	24 (28)	14	2	0
20	MF	(Brazil) Thiaguinho	2	0	0	0	0	0	0	0	2	0	1	0
20	MF	(Brazil) Régis	0	0	0 (1)	0	0 (5)	0	0 (1)	0	0 (7)	0	0	0
21	FW	(Paraguay) Sergio Díaz	0	0	0 (1)	0	0	0	0 (1)	0	0 (2)	0	0	0
22	MF	(Brazil) Mateus Vital	5 (6)	0	4 (2)	0	21 (10)	2	1 (2)	1	31 (20)	3	3	0
23	DF	(Brazil) Fagner	12 (1)	0	10	0	28 (2)	1	6	0	56 (3)	1	17	0
25	FW	(Brazil) Clayson	10 (3)	2	8 (2)	2	22 (10)	3	6 (1)	0	46 (16)	7	13	0
26	MF	(Brazil) Richard	4 (5)	0	0 (2)	0	1 (2)	0	1 (1)	0	6 (10)	0	0	0
26	DF	(Brazil) Gil	0	0	6	0	29	1	0	0	35	1	6	0
27	GK	(Brazil) Walter	0 (1)	0	0	0	6	0	1 (1)	0	7 (2)	0	0	0
28	MF	(Brazil) Ramiro	9 (1)	0	4 (1)	0	13 (5)	0	3 (2)	0	29 (9)	0	6	0
29	FW	(Brazil) André Luis	2 (1)	0	0	0	1	0	0	0	3 (1)	0	0	0
31	MF	(Brazil) Janderson	0	0	0 (1)	0	10 (10)	2	0	0	10 (11)	2	0	0
32	FW	(Brazil) Gustavo Silva	1 (4)	0	0	0	0	0	0	0	1 (4)	0	0	0
34	DF	(Brazil) Pedro Henrique	4 (1)	0	0	0	3	0	1	0	8 (1)	0	1	0
35	DF	(Brazil) Danilo Avelar	15 (1)	4	8	0	25	2	6	1	54 (1)	7	12	0
36	DF	(Brazil) Lucas Piton	0	0	0	0	0 (1)	0	0	0	0 (1)	0	0	0
37	FW	(Brazil) Everaldo	0	0	0	0	3 (6)	1	0	0	3 (6)	1	1	0
38	MF	(Brazil) Pedrinho	8 (9)	0	7 (1)	2	25 (2)	5	2 (2)	0	42 (14)	7	5	0
39	MF	(Brazil) Fabricio Oya	0 (1)	0	0	0	0	0	0	0	0 (1)	0	0	0
40	GK	(Brazil) Filipe	0	0	0	0	0	0	0	0	0	0	0	0

== Overview ==
Competition	First match	Last match	Starting round	Final position	Record							
Competition	First match	Last match	Starting round	Final position	Pld	W	D	L	GF	GA	GD	Win %
Série A	28 April 2019	8 December 2019	Matchday 1	8th	38	14	14	10	42	34	+8	36.84
Copa do Brasil	7 February 2019	4 June 2019	First stage	Round of 16	8	3	1	4	11	9	+2	37.50
Campeonato Paulista	20 January 2019	21 April 2019	Matchday 1	Winners	18	8	6	4	16	13	+3	44.44
Copa Sudamericana	14 February 2019	25 September 2019	First stage	Semi-final	10	4	5	1	13	8	+5	40.00
Total					74	29	26	19	82	64	+18	39.19

Source: Competitions

== Pre-season and friendlies ==
13 January 2011 Friendly	Corinthians	1–1	Santos	São Paulo
17:30 UTC−3	Gustavo 4'	Report	Pedro Henrique 24' (o.g.)	Stadium: Arena Corinthians; Attendance: 33,173; Referee: Vinicius Furlan

29 June 2019 Friendly	Botafogo	2–1	Corinthians	Ribeirão Preto
20:00 UTC−3	Naylhor 54'; Erick 90+2'	Report	Boselli 66'	Stadium: Estádio Santa Cruz; Referee: Vinícius Gonçalves Dias Araújo

4 July 2019 Friendly	Vila Nova	1–2	Corinthians	Goiânia
21:30 UTC−3	Richard 52'	Report	Vágner Love 38'; Régis 90+1'	Stadium: Estádio Serra Dourada; Referee: Breno Vieira Souza

7 July 2019 Friendly	Londrina	2–1	Corinthians	Maringá
11:00 UTC−3	Higor Leite 30'; Paulinho Moccelin 44'	Report	Régis 64'	Stadium: Estádio Willie Davids; Referee: Nilo Neves de Souza Júnior

Last updated: 5 July 2019

== Campeonato Paulista ==
For the 2019 Campeonato Paulista, the 16 teams are divided in four groups of 4 teams (A, B, C, D). They will face all teams, except those that are in their own group, with the top two teams from each group qualifying for the quarterfinals. The two overall worst teams will be relegated.

Group C
Pos	Team	Pld	W	D	L	GF	GA	GD	Pts	Qualification or relegation
1	Corinthians	12	6	3	3	10	8	+2	21	Knockout stage
2	Ferroviária	12	4	6	2	12	9	+3	18	Knockout stage
3	Mirassol	12	2	5	5	9	18	−9	11	
4	Bragantino	12	2	4	6	11	21	−10	10	

Source: Soccerway

=== First stage ===
20 January 2019 1	Corinthians	1–1	São Caetano	São Paulo
17:00 UTC−3	Henrique 90+4'	Report	Rafael Marques 28' (pen.)	Stadium: Arena Corinthians; Attendance: 31,279; Referee: Flávio Rodrigues de Souza

23 January 2019 2	Guarani	2–1	Corinthians	Campinas
19:15 UTC−3	Diego Cardoso 37'; Rondinelly 41'	Report	Gustavo 8'	Stadium: Estádio Brinco de Ouro; Attendance: 7,252; Referee: Vinícius Gonçalves Dias Araújo

26 January 2019 3	Corinthians	1–0	Ponte Preta	São Paulo
19:00 UTC−3	Gustavo 77'	Report		Stadium: Arena Corinthians; Attendance: 25,865; Referee: Salim Fende Chavez

30 January 2019 4	Corinthians	0–2	Red Bull Brasil	São Paulo
19:15 UTC−3		Report	Ytalo 74'; Bruno Tubarão 90+3'	Stadium: Arena Corinthians; Attendance: 23,841; Referee: Vinicius Furlan

2 February 2019 5	Palmeiras	0–1	Corinthians	São Paulo
17:00 UTC−3		Report	Avelar 7'	Stadium: Allianz Parque; Attendance: 38,550; Referee: Luiz Flávio de Oliveira

10 February 2019 6	Novorizontino	1–0	Corinthians	Novo Horizonte
17:00 UTC−3	Murilo Henrique 84'	Report		Stadium: Estádio Dr. Jorge Ismael de Biasi; Attendance: 7,452; Referee: José Cláudio Rocha Filho

17 February 2019 7	Corinthians	2–1	São Paulo	São Paulo
19:00 UTC−3	Manoel 42'; Gustavo 72'	Report	Pablo 56'	Stadium: Arena Corinthians; Attendance: 42,580; Referee: Lucas Canetto Bellote

24 February 2019 8	Botafogo	0–1	Corinthians	Ribeirão Preto
19:00 UTC−3		Report	Boselli 82'	Stadium: Estádio Santa Cruz; Attendance: 6,821; Referee: Raphael Claus

2 March 2019 9	São Bento	1–1	Corinthians	Sorocaba
16:30 UTC−3	Paulo Henrique 60'	Report	Clayson 38'	Stadium: Estádio Walter Ribeiro; Attendance: 9,221; Referee: Luiz Flávio de Oliveira

10 March 2019 10	Corinthians	0–0	Santos	São Paulo
16:00 UTC−3		Report		Stadium: Arena Corinthians; Attendance: 41,737; Referee: Douglas Marques das Flores

17 March 2019 11	Corinthians	1–0	Oeste	São Paulo
16:00 UTC−3	Avelar 60'	Report		Stadium: Arena Corinthians; Attendance: 38,571; Referee: Lucas Canetto Bellote

20 March 2019 12	Ituano	0–1	Corinthians	Itu
21:30 UTC−3		Report	Avelar 78'	Stadium: Estádio Novelli Júnior; Attendance: 7,146; Referee: Salim Fende Chavez

=== Knockout stages ===
24 March 2019 Quarter-finals	Ferroviária	1–1	Corinthians	Araraquara
19:00 UTC−3	Diogo Mateus 54'	Report	Gustavo 87'	Stadium: Arena da Fonte Luminosa; Attendance: 12,998; Referee: Vinicius Furlan

27 March 2019 Quarter-finals	Corinthians	1–1 (2–2 agg.) (4–3 p)	Ferroviária	São Paulo
21:30 UTC−3	Júnior Urso 33'	Report	Thiago Santos 59'	Stadium: Arena Corinthians; Attendance: 34,488; Referee: Luiz Flávio de Oliveira
	Penalties
	Gustavo (penalty scored); Clayson (penalty scored); Avelar (penalty missed); Boselli (penalty scored); Pedrinho (penalty scored)		(penalty missed) Tony; (penalty missed) Thiago Santos; (penalty scored) Uilliam; (penalty scored) Higor Meritão; (penalty scored) Tadeu

31 March 2019 Semi-finals	Corinthians	2–1	Santos	São Paulo
16:00 UTC−3	Manoel 3'; Clayson 31'	Report	González 7'	Stadium: Arena Corinthians; Attendance: 40,249; Referee: Vinícius Gonçalves Dias Araújo

8 April 2019 Semi-finals	Santos	1–0 (2–2 agg.) (6–7 p)	Corinthians	São Paulo
20:00 UTC−3	Gustavo Henrique 85'	Report		Stadium: Estádio do Pacaembu (Note: Santos played this match at Estádio do Pacaembu, São Paulo, instead of their regular stadium Vila Belmiro, Santos.); Attendance: 38,542; Referee: Raphael Claus
	Penalties
	Rodrygo (penalty scored); Kaio Jorge (penalty missed); Soteldo (penalty scored); Sánchez (penalty scored); González (penalty scored); Diego Pituca (penalty scored); Alison (penalty scored); Victor Ferraz (penalty missed)		(penalty missed) Boselli; (penalty scored) Vágner Love; (penalty scored) Ramiro; (penalty scored) Júnior Urso; (penalty scored) Fagner; (penalty scored) Sornoza; (penalty scored) Avelar; (penalty scored) Henrique

14 April 2019 Finals	São Paulo	0–0	Corinthians	São Paulo
16:00 UTC−3		Report		Stadium: Estádio do Morumbi; Attendance: 58,713; Referee: Luiz Flávio de Oliveira

21 April 2019 Finals	Corinthians	2–1 (2–1 agg.)	São Paulo	São Paulo
16:00 UTC−3	Avelar 30'; Vágner Love 88'	Report	Antony 45+2'	Stadium: Arena Corinthians; Attendance: 46,903; Referee: Raphael Claus

== Sudamericana ==
=== Elimination stages ===
14 February 2019 First stage	Corinthians (Brazil)	1–1	(Argentina) Racing	São Paulo, Brazil
21:30 UTC−2 (Note: The Corinthians v Racing match was originally scheduled for 14 February 2019, 19:15 local time, but was re-scheduled to 21:30 local time.)	Gustavo 88'	Report	Ríos 22'	Stadium: Arena Corinthians; Attendance: 24,237; Referee: Víctor Carrillo (Peru)

27 February 2019 First stage	Racing (Argentina)	1–1 (2–2 agg.) (4–5 p)	(Brazil) Corinthians	Avellaneda, Argentina
21:30 UTC−3	Cristaldo 41'	Report	Vágner Love 50'	Stadium: Estadio Presidente Juan Domingo Perón; Referee: Wilmar Roldán (Colombia)
	Penalties
	Cvitanich (penalty scored); Domínguez (penalty missed); Cristaldo (penalty missed); Fernández (penalty scored); Pillud (penalty scored); Soto (penalty scored); Solari (penalty missed)		(penalty scored) Gustavo; (penalty scored) Mateus Vital; (penalty missed) Sornoza; (penalty scored) Vágner Love; (penalty missed) Avelar; (penalty scored) Richard; (penalty scored) Fagner

23 May 2019 Second stage	Corinthians (Brazil)	2–0	(Venezuela) Deportivo Lara	São Paulo, Brazil
19:15 UTC−3	Vágner Love 59'; Gustavo 71'	Report		Stadium: Arena Corinthians; Attendance: 28,080; Referee: Cristian Garay (Chile)

30 May 2019 Second stage	Deportivo Lara (Venezuela)	0–2 (0–4 agg.)	(Brazil) Corinthians	Cabudare, Venezuela
16:00 UTC−4		Report	Júnior Urso 32'; Sornoza 54'	Stadium: Estadio Metropolitano de Cabudare; Attendance: 3,352; Referee: Wilmar Roldán (Colombia)

=== Final stages ===
25 July 2019 Round of 16	Corinthians (Brazil)	2–0	(Uruguay) Montevideo Wanderers	São Paulo, Brazil
21:30 UTC−3	Clayson 19'; Pedrinho 85'	Report		Stadium: Arena Corinthians; Attendance: 33,204; Referee: José Argote (Venezuela)

1 August 2019 Round of 16	Montevideo Wanderers (Uruguay)	1–2 (1–4 agg.)	(Brazil) Corinthians	Montevideo, Uruguay
21:30 UTC−3	Bravo 49'	Report	Vágner Love 46', 60'	Stadium: Estadio Gran Parque Central (Note: Montevideo Wanderers played this match at Estadio Gran Parque Central, instead of their regular stadium Parque Alfredo Víctor Viera.); Referee: Éber Aquino (Paraguay)

22 August 2019 Quarter-finals	Corinthians (Brazil)	0–0	(Brazil) Fluminense	São Paulo, Brazil
21:30 UTC−3		Report		Stadium: Arena Corinthians; Attendance: 37,550; Referee: Andrés Rojas (Colombia)

29 August 2019 Quarter-finals	Fluminense (Brazil)	1–1 (1–1a agg.)	(Brazil) Corinthians	Rio de Janeiro, Brazil
21:30 UTC−3	Pablo Dyego 83'	Report	Pedrinho 54'	Stadium: Maracanã; Attendance: 57,703; Referee: Diego Haro (Peru)

18 September 2019 Semi-finals	Corinthians (Brazil)	0–2	(Ecuador) Independiente del Valle	São Paulo, Brazil
21:30 UTC−3		Report	Torres 45+2', 68'	Stadium: Arena Corinthians; Attendance: 37,419; Referee: Leodán González (Uruguay)

25 September 2019 Semi-finals	Independiente del Valle (Ecuador)	2–2 (4–2 agg.)	(Brazil) Corinthians	Quito, Ecuador
19:30 UTC−5	Sánchez 67'; Cabeza 90'	Report	Boselli 28'; Clayson 86' (pen.)	Stadium: Estadio Olímpico Atahualpa (Note: Independiente del Valle play their home matches at Estadio Olímpico Atahualpa, Quito, instead of their regular stadium Estadio Rumiñahui, Sangolquí.); Referee: Piero Maza (Chile)

== Campeonato Brasileiro ==
Pos	Team	Pld	W	D	L	GF	GA	GD	Pts	Qualification or relegation
6	São Paulo	38	17	12	9	39	30	+9	63	Qualification for Copa Libertadores group stage (Note: Flamengo qualified for the Copa Libertadores group stage by winning the 2019 Copa Libertadores. Athletico Paranaense qualified for the Copa Libertadores group stage by winning the 2019 Copa do Brasil.)
7	Internacional	38	16	9	13	44	39	+5	57	Qualification for Copa Libertadores second stage
8	Corinthians	38	14	14	10	42	34	+8	56	Qualification for Copa Libertadores second stage
9	Fortaleza	38	15	8	15	50	49	+1	53	Qualification for Copa Sudamericana first stage
10	Goiás	38	15	7	16	46	64	−18	52	Qualification for Copa Sudamericana first stage

Source: CBF
Rules for classification: 1) points; 2) wins; 3) goal difference; 4) goals scored; 5) head-to-head results; 6) least red cards received; 7) least yellow cards received; 8) draw.

=== Results ===
28 April 2019 1	Bahia	3–2	Corinthians	Salvador
16:00 UTC−3	Arthur Caíke 45+3'; Artur 75'; Rogério 83'	Report	Pedrinho 45+1'; Clayson 90+4'	Stadium: Itaipava Arena Fonte Nova; Attendance: 29,294; Referee: Wilton Pereira Sampaio

1 May 2019 2	Corinthians	1–0	Chapecoense	São Paulo
16:00 UTC−3	Carlos Augusto 54'	Report		Stadium: Arena Corinthians; Attendance: 30,668; Referee: Ricardo Marques Ribeiro

4 May 2019 3	Vasco da Gama	1–1	Corinthians	Manaus
19:00 UTC−3	López 38' (pen.)	Report	Mateus Vital 16'	Stadium: Arena da Amazônia (Note: Vasco da Gama played this match at Arena da Amazônia, Manaus, instead of their regular stadium Estádio São Januário, Rio de Janeiro.); Attendance: 25,779; Referee: Rodrigo D'Alonso Ferreira

11 May 2019 4	Corinthians	0–0	Grêmio	São Paulo
19:00 UTC−3		Report		Stadium: Arena Corinthians; Attendance: 36,624; Referee: Marcelo de Lima Henrique

19 May 2019 5	Athletico Paranaense	0–2	Corinthians	Curitiba
16:00 UTC−3		Report	Vágner Love 13'; Pedrinho 86'	Stadium: Arena da Baixada; Attendance: 19,409; Referee: Wagner Nascimento Magalhães

26 May 2019 6	Corinthians	1–0	São Paulo	São Paulo
19:00 UTC−3	Pedrinho 6'	Report		Stadium: Arena Corinthians; Attendance: 39,670; Referee: Flávio Rodrigues de Souza

8 June 2019 8	Cruzeiro	0–0	Corinthians	Belo Horizonte
19:00 UTC−3		Report		Stadium: Mineirão; Attendance: 21,370; Referee: Marcelo de Lima Henrique

12 June 2019 9	Santos	1–0	Corinthians	Santos
21:30 UTC−3	Eduardo Sasha 58'	Report		Stadium: Vila Belmiro; Attendance: 11,831; Referee: Wagner Nascimento de Magalhães

14 July 2019 10	Corinthians	1–0	CSA	São Paulo
16:00 UTC−3	Vágner Love 77'	Report		Stadium: Arena Corinthians; Attendance: 34,238; Referee: Wagner Reway

21 July 2019 11	Corinthians	1–1	Flamengo	São Paulo
16:00 UTC−3	Clayson 61' (pen.)	Report	Gabriel 90'	Stadium: Arena Corinthians; Attendance: 35,039; Referee: Leandro Vuaden

28 July 2019 12	Fortaleza	1–3	Corinthians	Fortaleza
19:00 UTC−3	Manoel 39' (o.g.)	Report	Boselli 66'; Pedrinho 70'; Avelar 80'	Stadium: Arena Castelão; Referee: Wilton Pereira Sampaio

4 August 2019 13	Corinthians	1–1	Palmeiras	São Paulo
19:00 UTC−3	Manoel 12'	Report	Felipe Melo 47'	Stadium: Arena Corinthians; Attendance: 43,045; Referee: Anderson Daronco

7 August 2019 (Note: This match was originally expected to take place on 1 June, but was postponed due to Corinthians' participation at the 2019 Copa Sudamericana and 2019 Copa do Brasil.) 7	Corinthians	2–0	Goiás	São Paulo
19:15 UTC−3	Júnior Urso 24'; Boselli 86' (pen.)	Report		Stadium: Arena Corinthians; Attendance: 34,790; Referee: Bruno Arleu de Araújo

11 August 2019 14	Internacional	0–0	Corinthians	Porto Alegre
11:00 UTC−3		Report		Stadium: Estádio Beira-Rio; Attendance: 36,166; Referee: Caio Max Augusto Vieira

17 August 2019 15	Corinthians	2–0	Botafogo	São Paulo
17:00 UTC−3	Boselli 41'; Everaldo 55'	Report		Stadium: Arena Corinthians; Attendance: 39,122; Referee: Rafael Traci

25 August 2019 16	Avaí	1–1	Corinthians	Florianópolis
19:00 UTC−3	Franco 59'	Report	Vágner Love 76'	Stadium: Estádio da Ressacada; Attendance: 9,753; Referee: Ricardo Marques Ribeiro

1 September 2019 17	Corinthians	1–0	Atlético Mineiro	São Paulo
19:00 UTC−3	Gustavo 88'	Report		Stadium: Arena Corinthians; Attendance: 32,205; Referee: Wilton Pereira Sampaio

7 September 2019 18	Corinthians	2–2	Ceará	São Paulo
11:00 UTC−3	João Lucas 22' (o.g.); Vágner Love 36'	Report	Thiago Galhardo 58'; Leandro Carvalho 90+1'	Stadium: Arena Corinthians; Attendance: 43,449; Referee: Paulo Roberto Alves Júnior

15 September 2019 19	Fluminense	1–0	Corinthians	Brasília
16:00 UTC−3	Ganso 39'	Report		Stadium: Estádio Nacional Mané Garrincha (Note: Fluminense played this match at Estádio Nacional Mané Garrincha, Brasília, instead of their regular stadium Maracanã, Rio de Janeiro.); Attendance: 15,733; Referee: Jean Pierre Gonçalves Lima

21 September 2019 20	Corinthians	2–1	Bahia	São Paulo
19:00 UTC−3	Vágner Love 43' (pen.); Clayson 74'	Report	Gilberto 63' (pen.)	Stadium: Arena Corinthians; Attendance: 29,811; Referee: Dewson Fernando Freitas da Silva

29 September 2019 22	Corinthians	1–0	Vasco da Gama	São Paulo
11:00 UTC−3	Ralf 58'	Report		Stadium: Arena Corinthians; Attendance: 37,360; Referee: Ricardo Marques Ribeiro

2 October 2019 (Note: This match was originally expected to take place on 25 September, but was postponed due to Corinthians' participation at the 2019 Copa Sudamericana.) 21	Chapecoense	0–1	Corinthians	Chapecó
19:15 UTC−3		Report	Avelar 62'	Stadium: Arena Condá; Attendance: 5,036; Referee: Daniel Nobre Bins

5 October 2019 23	Grêmio	0–0	Corinthians	Porto Alegre
19:00 UTC−3		Report		Stadium: Arena do Grêmio; Attendance: 16,542; Referee: Bruno Arleu de Araújo

10 October 2019 24	Corinthians	2–2	Athletico Paranaense	São Paulo
19:15 UTC−3	Gil 15'; Boselli 45+2'	Report	Léo Cittadini 23'; Erick 31'	Stadium: Arena Corinthians; Attendance: 22,964; Referee: André Luiz de Freitas Castro

13 October 2019 25	São Paulo	1–0	Corinthians	São Paulo
18:00 UTC−3	Reinaldo 65' (pen.)	Report		Stadium: Estádio do Morumbi; Attendance: 37,561; Referee: Rodolpho Toski Marques

16 October 2019 26	Goiás	2–2	Corinthians	Goiânia
21:30 UTC−3	Michael 36'; Barcia 70'	Report	Janderson 10'; Gustavo 90+6' (pen.)	Stadium: Estádio Serra Dourada; Attendance: 15,029; Referee: Wagner Nascimento Magalhães

19 October 2019 27	Corinthians	1–2	Cruzeiro	São Paulo
19:00 UTC−3	Fagner 33'	Report	Fred 37' (pen.); Éderson 70'	Stadium: Arena Corinthians; Attendance: 31,882; Referee: Bruno Arleu de Araújo

26 October 2019 28	Corinthians	0–0	Santos	São Paulo
17:00 UTC−3		Report		Stadium: Arena Corinthians; Attendance: 32,416; Referee: Luiz Flávio de Oliveira

30 October 2019 29	CSA	2–1	Corinthians	Maceió
21:30 UTC−3	Apodi 24'; Ricardo Bueno 79'	Report	Pedrinho 44'	Stadium: Estádio Rei Pelé; Attendance: 15,428; Referee: Rafael Traci

3 November 2019 30	Flamengo	4–1	Corinthians	Rio de Janeiro
16:00 UTC−3	Bruno Henrique 45' (pen.), 45+1', 46'; Vitinho 66'	Report	Mateus Vital 51'	Stadium: Maracanã; Attendance: 64,985; Referee: Jean Pierre Gonçalves Lima

6 November 2019 31	Corinthians	3–2	Fortaleza	São Paulo
19:30 UTC−3	Boselli 36', 71'; Júnior Urso 47'	Report	Romarinho 33'; Kieza 51'	Stadium: Arena Corinthians; Attendance: 22,453; Referee: Caio Max Augusto Vieira

9 November 2019 32	Palmeiras	1–1	Corinthians	São Paulo
19:00 UTC−3	Bruno Henrique 90+3'	Report	Michel Macedo 90+1'	Stadium: Estádio do Pacaembu (Note: Palmeiras played this match at Estádio do Pacaembu, São Paulo, instead of their regular stadium Allianz Parque, São Paulo.); Attendance: 36,290; Referee: Vinícius Gonçalves Dias Araújo

17 November 2019 33	Corinthians	0–0	Internacional	São Paulo
18:00 UTC−3		Report		Stadium: Arena Corinthians; Attendance: 29,423; Referee: Marcelo de Lima Henrique

24 November 2019 34	Botafogo	1–0	Corinthians	Rio de Janeiro
18:00 UTC−3	Diego Souza 18'	Report		Stadium: Estádio Olímpico Nilton Santos; Attendance: 22,548; Referee: André Luiz de Freitas Castro

27 November 2019 35	Corinthians	3–0	Avaí	São Paulo
21:30 UTC−3	Gustavo 21'; Júnior Urso 51'; Boselli 86'	Report		Stadium: Arena Corinthians; Attendance: 17,701; Referee: Wagner Nascimento Magalhães

1 December 2019 36	Atlético Mineiro	2–1	Corinthians	Belo Horizonte
18:00 UTC−3	Cazares 18'; Fábio Santos 73' (pen.)	Report	Janderson 19'	Stadium: Estádio Independência; Attendance: 18,062; Referee: Paulo Roberto Alves Júnior

4 December 2019 37	Ceará	0–1	Corinthians	Fortaleza
19:30 UTC−3		Report	Gustavo 81'	Stadium: Arena Castelão; Attendance: 49,200; Referee: Rafael Traci

8 December 2019 38	Corinthians	1–2	Fluminense	São Paulo
16:00 UTC−3	Gustavo 62'	Report	Evanilson 7', 27'	Stadium: Arena Corinthians; Attendance: 36,316; Referee: Rodrigo D'Alonso Ferreira

== Copa do Brasil ==
=== Preliminary stages ===
7 February 2019 First stage	Ferroviário	2–2	Corinthians	Londrina
21:00 UTC−3	Edson Cariús 14', 54'	Report	Gustavo 19', 55'	Stadium: Estádio do Café (Note: Ferroviário played this match at Estádio do Café, Londrina, instead of Arena Castelão, Fortaleza or their regular stadium Estádio Elzir Cabral, Fortaleza.); Attendance: 19,316; Referee: Paulo Roberto Alves Júnior

20 February 2019 Second stage	Corinthians	4–2	Avenida	São Paulo
21:30 UTC−3	Henrique 45+1'; Avelar 76'; Júnior Urso 87'; Gustavo 90+1'	Report	Flávio Torres 3'; Tito 9'	Stadium: Arena Corinthians; Attendance: 21,402; Referee: Caio Max Augusto Vieira

13 March 2019 Third stage	Ceará	1–3	Corinthians	Fortaleza
21:50 UTC−3 (Note: The Ceará v Corinthians match was originally scheduled for 13 March 2019, 21:30 local time, but was delayed to 21:50 local time due to heavy rain.)	Juninho 21' (pen.)	Report	Júnior Urso 8'; Vágner Love 63'; Jádson 71'	Stadium: Arena Castelão; Attendance: 26,199; Referee: Leandro Vuaden

3 April 2019 Third stage	Corinthians	0–1 (3–2 agg.)	Ceará	São Paulo
21:30 UTC−3		Report	Roger 87'	Stadium: Arena Corinthians; Attendance: 34,911; Referee: Rafael Traci

17 April 2019 Fourth stage	Chapecoense	1–0	Corinthians	Chapecó
21:30 UTC−3	Aylon 33'	Report		Stadium: Arena Condá; Attendance: 7,758; Referee: Bruno Arleu de Araújo

24 April 2019 Fourth stage	Corinthians	2–0 (2–1 agg.)	Chapecoense	São Paulo
21:30 UTC−3	Boselli 15'; Mateus Vital 69'	Report		Stadium: Arena Corinthians; Attendance: 33,864; Referee: Daniel Nobre Bins

=== Knockout stages ===
15 May 2019 Round of 16	Corinthians	0–1	Flamengo	São Paulo
21:30 UTC−3		Report	Willian Arão 78'	Stadium: Arena Corinthians; Attendance: 30,693; Referee: Anderson Daronco

4 June 2019 Round of 16	Flamengo	1–0 (2–0 agg.)	Corinthians	Rio de Janeiro
21:30 UTC−3	Rodrigo Caio 87'	Report		Stadium: Maracanã; Attendance: 60,171; Referee: Leandro Vuaden

== See also ==
- List of Sport Club Corinthians Paulista seasons
