= Uillian Correia =

Brazilian footballer (born 1989)

Personal information
- Full name: Uillian Correia Granemann
- Date of birth: 27 September 1989 (age 37)
- Place of birth: Fátima do Sul, Brazil
- Height: 1.84 m (6 ft 1/2 in)
- Position: Midfielder

Team information
- Current team: Oeste

Youth career
- 2006–2009: Atlético Paranaense

Senior career*
Years	Team	Apps	(Gls)
2010	Rio Branco-PR	9	(0)
2010	Cuiabá	0	(0)
2011	Santa Cruz-RS	14	(0)
2011	Pelotas	0	(0)
2012	Santa Cruz-RS	13	(1)
2012–2013	Paços Ferreira	0	(0)
2013	→ Feirense (loan)	3	(0)
2014	Sampaio Corrêa	43	(5)
2015	Ceará	29	(2)
2015–2017	Cruzeiro	1	(0)
2016	→ Santa Cruz (loan)	34	(0)
2017	→ Vitória (loan)	44	(4)
2018–2019	Vitória	16	(1)
2018	→ Coritiba (loan)	15	(0)
2019	→ Red Bull Brasil (loan)	14	(1)
2019–2021	Red Bull Bragantino	52	(2)
2021–2022	Cuiabá	30	(1)
2022	Ferroviária	11	(0)
2022	CRB	19	(0)
2023	Inter de Limeira	11	(0)
2023	Santa Cruz-RS	10	(0)
2024–	Oeste	3	(0)
- * Club domestic league appearances and goals as of 23:01, 3 May 2022 (UTC)

Uillian Correia Granemann (born 27 September 1989), known as Uillian Correia or simply Uillian, is a Brazilian footballer who plays as a midfielder for Oeste.

== Club career ==
Born in Fátima do Sul, Mato Grosso do Sul, Uillian Correia was an Atlético Paranaense youth graduate. He made his debuts as a senior with Rio Branco-PR in 2010, and subsequently represented Santa Cruz-RS and Pelotas.

On 24 April 2012 Uillian Correia moved abroad, signing a three-year deal with Primeira Liga side F.C. Paços de Ferreira. On 23 January of the following year, after making no league appearances for the side, he was loaned to C.D. Feirense in Segunda Liga until June.

On 31 January 2014 Uillian Correia signed for Sampaio Corrêa. An undisputed starter, he appeared in 34 matches and scored two goals for the club.

On 13 January 2015 Uillian Correia joined Ceará, after agreeing to a three-year contract. On 28 August he moved to Série A team Cruzeiro, for a R$ 1.5 million fee. With lack of opportunity at Cruzeiro, he was loaned out to Santa Cruz in March 2016, as part of a deal which saw Raniel move in the opposite direction. He was loaned out again the following season to Vitória. In December 2017 he terminated his contract with Cruzeiro and made his move to Vitória permanent by signing a two-year deal.

Despite being captain of Vitória for the 2017 Campeonato Brasileiro Série A campaign, and playing 28 matches in the first half of 2018, Uillian Correia was loaned to Coritiba in June 2018, with the deal lasting until December but with the option to extend should Coritiba win promotion. He returned to Vitória, now in Série B for 2019, but was not in the plans of the manager, and had too high a salary, so he was loaned to Red Bull Brasil, initially for the 2019 Campeonato Paulista, but with an option to extend to the end of the year. He became part of the Red Bull Bragantino squad when Red Bull Brasil merged with Clube Atlético Bragantino in April 2019.

== Honours ==
Sampaio Corrêa

- Campeonato Maranhense: 2014

Ceará

- Copa do Nordeste: 2015

Santa Cruz

- Copa do Nordeste: 2016
- Campeonato Pernambucano: 2016

Vitória

- Campeonato Baiano: 2017

Red Bull Bragantino

- Campeonato Brasileiro Série B: 2019

Cuiabá

- Campeonato Mato-Grossense: 2021
