= Ángelo Araos =

Chilean footballer (born 1997)

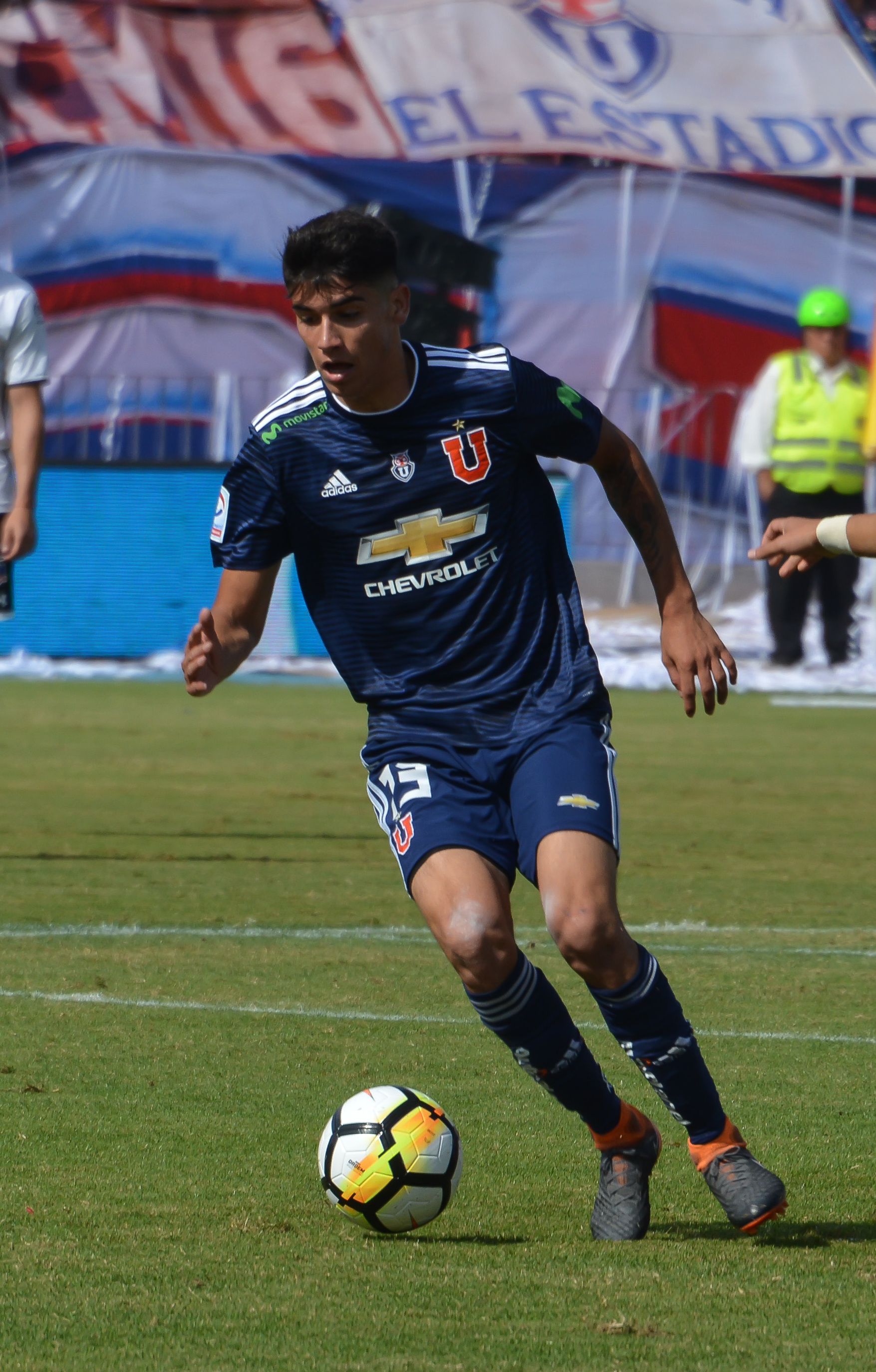
- Araos with Universidad de Chile in 2018

Personal information
- Full name: Ángelo Giovanni Araos Llanos
- Date of birth: 6 January 1997 (age 29)
- Place of birth: Antofagasta, Chile
- Height: 1.80 m (5 ft 11 in)
- Position: Attacking midfielder

Team information
- Current team: Unión Española
- Number: 19

Youth career
- 2015–2016: Deportes Antofagasta

Senior career*
Years	Team	Apps	(Gls)
2016–2017	Deportes Antofagasta	40	(2)
2018–2019	Universidad de Chile	14	(1)
2018–2019	→ Corinthians (loan)	17	(0)
2019–2021	Corinthians	35	(1)
2019	→ Ponte Preta (loan)	9	(1)
2022–2023	Necaxa	32	(2)
2023	→ Atlético Goianiense (loan)	2	(0)
2024–2025	Atlético Goianiense	8	(0)
2025–2026	Puebla	9	(1)
2026–	Unión Española	0	(0)

International career^{‡}
2017	Chile U20	1	(0)
2019–2020	Chile U23	9	(2)
2018–	Chile	1	(0)
- * Club domestic league appearances and goals as of 5 August 2026 ‡ National team caps and goals as of 9 September 2019

Ángelo Giovanni Araos Llanos (born 6 January 1997) is a Chilean professional footballer who plays as an attacking midfielder for Primera B club Unión Española.

== Club career ==
=== Corinthians ===
On July 31, 2018, Corinthians signed a one-year loan agreement with Araos with an automatic purchase clause of US$4 million at the end of the loan.

==== Ponte Preta (loan) ====
On 2 October 2019 Ponte Preta signed Araos on loan until the end of 2019 season.

=== Atlético Goianiense ===
After a stint on loan from Mexican club Necaxa in 2023, he renewed his contract with Atlético Goianiense on a two-year deal.

=== Puebla ===
In August 2025, Araos ended his contract with Atlético Goianiense and signed with Liga MX club Puebla.

=== Unión Española ===
Back to Chile, Araos signed with Unión Española in the Liga de Ascenso on 5 August 2026.

== International career ==
Araos made an appearance for Chile at under-20 level in the 2017 South American Championship. At under-23 level, Araos represented Chile in both the 2019 Toulon Tournament and the 2020 Pre-Olympic Tournament, in addition to a friendly match versus Brazil U23 on 9 September 2019.

At senior level, he made his debut in a friendly match versus Poland on 8 June 2018.

== Career statistics ==
=== Club ===
As of 26 October 2021

Club	Season	League			Cup		Continental		Other		Total	
Club	Season	Division	Apps	Goals	Apps	Goals	Apps	Goals	Apps	Goals	Apps	Goals
Deportes Antofagasta	2016–17	Chilean Primera División	11	0	—		—		—		11	0
Deportes Antofagasta	2017	Chilean Primera División	29	2	7	0	—		—		36	2
Deportes Antofagasta	Total		40	2	7	0	—		—		47	2
Universidad de Chile	2018	Chilean Primera División	14	1	5	3	5 (Note: Appearances in Copa Libertadores)	1	—		24	5
Corinthians (loan)	2018	Série A	15	0	1	0	—		—		16	0
Corinthians (loan)	2019	Série A	0	0	0	0	0	0	2 (Note: Appearances in Campeonato Paulista)	0	2	0
Corinthians (loan)	Total		15	0	1	0	0	0	2	0	18	0
Corinthians	2019	Série A	0	0	—		—		—		0	0
Corinthians	2020	Série A	15	1	0	0	—		6	0	21	1
Corinthians	2021	Série A	11	0	2	0	2 (Note: Appearances in Copa Sudamericana)	0	3	0	18	2
Corinthians	Total		26	1	2	0	2	0	9	0	39	1
Ponte Preta (loan)	2019	Série B	9	1	—		—		—		9	1
Career total			104	5	15	3	7	1	11	0	137	9

=== International ===
As of 13 November 2019

Chile senior team
Year	Apps	Goals
2018	1	0
Total	1	0

== Honours ==
Corinthians

- Campeonato Paulista: 2019
