= Diogo Mateus =

Diogo Mateus may refer to:

- Diogo Mateus (rugby union) (born 1990), Portuguese rugby union player
- Diogo Mateus (footballer) (born 1993), Brazilian footballer
