= Richard (footballer, born 1994) =

Brazilian footballer

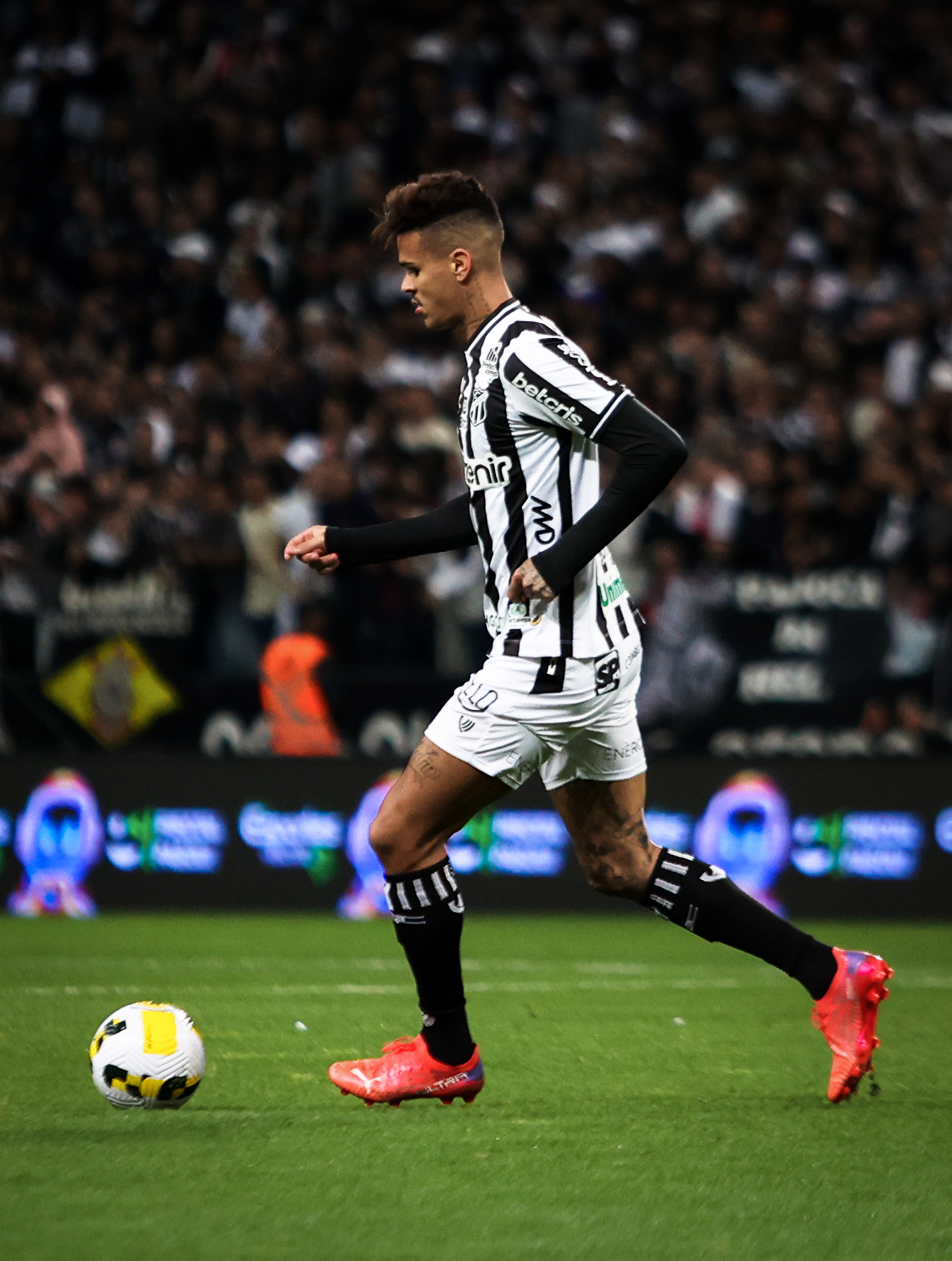
- Richard with Ceará in 2022

Personal information
- Full name: Richard Candido Coelho
- Date of birth: 18 February 1994 (age 32)
- Place of birth: Campinas, Brazil
- Height: 1.91 m (6 ft 3 in)
- Position: Defensive midfielder

Team information
- Current team: Coritiba
- Number: 25

Youth career
- Monte Azul
- 2012–2014: Comercial-SP

Senior career*
Years	Team	Apps	(Gls)
2013–2015	Comercial-SP	0	(0)
2016	Atlético Sorocaba	8	(0)
2017–2018	Atibaia	14	(1)
2017–2018	→ Fluminense (loan)	10	(0)
2018	Fluminense	57	(4)
2019–2021	Corinthians	19	(0)
2019	→ Vasco da Gama (loan)	25	(0)
2020–2021	→ Athletico Paranaense (loan)	71	(2)
2022–2023	Ceará	45	(0)
2023	→ Cruzeiro (loan)	6	(1)
2023–2025	Alanyaspor	66	(2)
2025–2026	Internacional	7	(0)
2026–	Coritiba	1	(0)
- * Club domestic league appearances and goals as of 15 September 2025

Richard Candido Coelho (born 18 February 1994), simply known as Richard, is a Brazilian professional footballer who plays as a defensive midfielder for Coritiba.

== Club career ==
=== Early career ===
Born in Campinas, São Paulo but raised in São Sebastião do Paraíso, Minas Gerais, Richard began his career with Monte Azul and finished his formation with Comercial-SP. He made his first team debut with the latter on 16 August 2013, coming on as a late substitute in a 2–2 away draw against XV de Piracicaba, for the year's Copa Paulista; it was his only appearance for the club.

After leaving Comercial, Richard represented Atlético Sorocaba and Atibaia, featuring sparingly for both sides.

=== Fluminense ===
On 17 August 2017, Richard was presented at Série A side Fluminense on loan, after a recommendation from the club's scouting area. He made his top tier debut on 17 September, starting in a 1–3 away loss against Atlético Paranaense.

On 8 February 2018, Richard signed a permanent four-year contract with Flu. He scored his first goal for the club on 15 April, netting the equalizer in a 1–2 loss at Corinthians.

=== Corinthians ===
On 10 December 2018, Richard moved to Corinthians on a four-year deal. Unable to establish himself as a regular starter, he was loaned to Vasco da Gama on 20 June 2019, until December.

Back to Timão for the 2020 campaign, Richard again featured rarely before moving to Athletico Paranaense on 20 July, on a 18-month loan deal for a €500,000 fee.

== Career statistics ==
As of 3 December 2021

Club	Season	League			State League		Cup		Continental		Other		Total	
Club	Season	Division	Apps	Goals	Apps	Goals	Apps	Goals	Apps	Goals	Apps	Goals	Apps	Goals
Comercial-SP	2013	Paulista A2	—		0	0	—		—		1 (Note: Appearance(s) in Copa Paulista)	0	1	0
Comercial-SP	2014	Paulista	—		0	0	—		—		0	0	0	0
Comercial-SP	2015	Paulista A2	—		0	0	—		—		0	0	0	0
Comercial-SP	Total		—		0	0	—		—		1	0	1	0
Atlético Sorocaba	2016	Paulista A2	—		8	0	—		—		—		8	0
Atibaia	2017	Paulista A3	—		11	1	—		—		3	0	14	1
Fluminense	2017	Série A	8	0	—		—		2 (Note: Appearance(s) in Copa Sudamericana)	0	0	0	10	0
Fluminense	2018	Série A	34	3	9	0	4	0	10	1	—		57	4
Fluminense	Total		42	3	9	0	4	0	12	1	0	0	67	4
Corinthians	2019	Série A	3	0	9	0	2	0	2	0	—		16	0
Corinthians	2020	Série A	0	0	3	0	0	0	0	0	—		3	0
Corinthians	Total		3	0	12	0	2	0	2	0	—		19	0
Vasco da Gama (loan)	2019	Série A	25	0	—		—		—		—		25	0
Athletico Paranaense (loan)	2020	Serie A	28	0	—		2	0	3 (Note: Appearance(s) in Copa Libertadores)	1	—		33	1
Athletico Paranaense (loan)	2021	Serie A	20	1	1	0	6	0	11	0	—		38	1
Athletico Paranaense (loan)	Total		48	1	1	0	8	0	14	1	—		71	2
Career total			118	4	41	1	14	0	28	2	4	0	205	7

== Honours ==
Corinthians

- Campeonato Paulista: 2019

Athletico Paranaense

- Copa Sudamericana: 2021
