= 2017 Campeonato Baiano =

Campeonato Baiano 1º Divisão
- Season: 2017
- Dates: Start date: 29 January 2017
- Teams: 11
- Champions: Vitória
- Relegated: Flamengo de Guanambi; Galícia
- Top goalscorer: André Lima (Vitória); Marclei (Bahia de Feira) (7 goals each)
- Biggest home win: Bahia 6–0 Bahia de Feira (February 8); Bahia 6–0 Fluminense de Feira (April 5)
- Highest scoring: Bahia de Feira 5-4 Galícia (March 5)
- Highest attendance: 32,762 (Bahia 1-2 Vitória
- Lowest attendance: 127 (Galícia 1-2 Jacuipense
- Average attendance: 3673

The 2017 Campeonato Baiano is the 113th edition of Bahia's top football league. Vitória won the tournament for the 29th time and second straight time against Bahia, on away goals, after a 1–1 draw on aggregate.

== Format ==
First Round

- The eleven teams each play each other once, for a total of 10 games.
- The top four teams go on to the Semi-Finals.
- The bottom two teams are relegated to the Campeonato Baiano 2° Divisão.

Final Rounds

- The four advancing teams are paired according to their record:
- 1st vs. 4th
- 2nd vs. 3rd
- The matches are played over two legs, on aggregate.
- The better of the two playing teams hosts the second leg.
- The two winners go on to the final, also decided over two legs.
- The better team, over both the first round and the Semi-Finals, hosts the second leg.

Qualification

- The top three teams not already playing in Série A, Série B, or Série C, or already assured qualification to Série D qualify for the 2018 Campeonato Brasileiro Série D
- The winner and runner-up, and fourth place qualify for the 2018 Copa do Brasil.
- The winner, runner-up, and third place qualify for the 2018 Copa do Nordeste.

== Teams ==
Club	Home city	2016 result
Atlântico	Lauro de Freitas	1st (2° Divisão)
Bahia	Salvador	2nd
Bahia de Feira	Feira de Santana	8th
Flamengo de Guanambi	Guanambi	7th
Fluminense de Feira	Feira de Santana	4th
Galícia	Salvador	5th
Jacobina	Jacobina	6th
Jaciupense	Riachão do Jacuípe	10th
Juazeirense	Juazeiro	3rd
Vitória	Salvador	1st
Vitória da Conquista	Vitória da Conquista	9th

== First round ==
Pos	Team	Pld	W	D	L	GF	GA	GD	Pts	Qualification or relegation
1	Vitória	10	10	0	0	27	4	+23	30	Advance to Semi-Finals
2	Bahia	10	6	3	1	19	4	+15	21	Advance to Semi-Finals
3	Fluminense de Feira	10	6	2	2	16	13	+3	20	Advance to Semi-Finals
4	Vitória da Conquista	10	4	3	3	13	6	+7	15	Advance to Semi-Finals
5	Jaciupense	10	4	3	3	9	9	0	15	
6	Bahia de Feira	10	4	1	5	13	21	−8	13	
7	Juazeirense	10	3	3	4	12	11	+1	12	
8	Jacobina	10	2	3	5	9	14	−5	9	
9	Atlântico	10	2	3	5	11	18	−7	9	
10	Flamengo de Guanambi	10	1	4	5	7	16	−9	7	Relegated to Campeonato Baiano 2° Divisão
11	Galícia	10	0	1	9	7	27	−20	1	Relegated to Campeonato Baiano 2° Divisão

== Final rounds ==
Semifinals
4	Vitória da Conquista	1	0	1
1	Vitória	1	5	6
3	Fluminense de Feira	0	0	0
2	Bahia	3	1	4

Finals
1	Vitória	1	0	1
2	Bahia	1	0	1

=== Semi-finals ===
16 April 2017
16:00 UTC–4

Vitória da Conquista	1-1	Vitória
Tidinho 70'	Report	90+4' André Lima

Estádio Lomanto Júnior, Vitória da Conquista
Attendance: 3619
Referee: Diego Pombo Lopez

23 April 2017
16:00 UTC–4

Vitória	5-0	Vitória da Conquista
David 13'; Cleiton Xavier 31' (pen.); Paulinho 46'; Uillian Correia 63'; Geferson 87'	Report

Barradão, Salvador
Attendance: 5354
Referee: Johnn Herbert Alves Bispo

Vitória win 6–1 on Aggregate.

16 April 2017
18:30 UTC–4

Fluminense de Feira	0-3	Bahia
Rafhael (yellow card) 73' (red card)	Report	33' Hernane; 37' Renê Júnior; 45' Régis; (red card) 87' Régis

Estádio Joia da Princesa, Feira de Santana
Attendance: 4471
Referee: Emerson Ricardo de Almeida Andrade

22 April 2017
16:00 UTC–4

Bahia	1-0	Fluminense de Feira
Hernane 32'	Report	(red card) 28' Edson

Itaipava Arena Fonte Nova, Salvador
Attendance: 6799
Referee: Ricarle Gustavo Gonçalves Batista

Bahia win 4–0 on Aggregate.

=== Final ===
3 May 2017
16:00 UTC–4

Bahia	1-1	Vitória
Tiago Pagnussat 34'	Report	Pablo Armero 78' (o.g.)

Itaipava Arena Fonte Nova, Salvador
Attendance: 24465
Referee: Raphael Claus
7 May 2017
16:00 UTC–4

Vitória	0-0	Bahia
	Report

Barradão, Salvador
Attendance: 30288
Referee: Marielson Alves Silva

Vitória win 1–1 on away goals

Campeonato Baiano
2017 champion

29th title

Fluminense de Feira, Vitória da Conquista, and Jaciupense qualify for the Série D.
Vitória, Bahia, and Vitória da Conquista qualify for the 2018 Copa do Brasil.
Vitória, Bahia, and Fluminense de Feira qualify for the 2018 Copa do Nordeste.

== Topscorers ==
Rank	Player	Club	Goals
1.	(Brazil) André Lima	Vitória	7
1.	(Brazil) Marclei	Bahia de Feira	7
2.	(Brazil) Kieza	Vitória	5
2.	(Brazil) Gustavo	Bahia	
3.	(Brazil) Diego Rosa	Bahia	4
3.	(Brazil) Deon	Flamengo de Guanambi	4
3.	(Brazil) Todinho	Vitória da Conquista	4
3.	(Brazil) Vitinho	Jacobina	4
4.	(Brazil) Cleiton Xavier	Vitória	3
4.	(Chile) Pineda	Vitória	3
4.	(Brazil) Robert	Juazeirense	3
4.	(Brazil) Diego Aragão	Vitória da Conquista	3
4.	(Brazil) João Neto	Fluminense de Feira	3
4.	(Brazil) Paulinho	Vitória	3
4.	(Brazil) Ebinho	Fluminense de Feira	3
4.	(Brazil) Marcelo Pano	Jacobina	3
