= 2018 Copa do Nordeste =

Tournament details
- Country: Brazil
- Dates: 15 August 2017–7 July 2018
- Teams: 20

Final positions
- Champions: Sampaio Corrêa
- Runners-up: Bahia
- 2019 Copa do Brasil: Sampaio Corrêa

Tournament statistics
- Matches played: 70
- Goals scored: 163 (2.33 per match)
- Top goal scorer(s): Arthur Cabral; Yago (5 goals each)

Awards
- Best player: Andrey

The 2018 Copa do Nordeste was the 15th edition of the main football tournament featuring teams from the Brazilian Northeast Region. The competition featured 20 clubs, with Bahia and Pernambuco having three seeds each, and Ceará, Rio Grande do Norte, Sergipe, Alagoas, Paraíba, Maranhão and Piauí with two seeds each.

Sampaio Corrêa defeated the defending champions Bahia 1–0 on aggregate to win their first Copa do Nordeste title. As champions, Sampaio Corrêa qualified for the Round of 16 of the 2019 Copa do Brasil.

== Format changes ==
In the 2018 season there was a qualifying stage. In the qualifying stage, a total of 8 teams competed in a single-elimination tournament where the four winners advanced to the group stage. The group stage had only 4 groups. 12 teams gained direct entries into the group stage while the other four berths were decided through the qualifying stage.

== Teams ==
The entry stage was determined as follows:

- Group stage: 12 teams
  - Teams which qualified for berths 1–2 from Bahia, Ceará and Pernambuco
  - Teams which qualified for berth 1 from Alagoas, Maranhão, Paraíba, Piauí, Rio Grande do Norte and Sergipe
- Qualifying stage: 8 teams
  - Teams which qualified for berth 3 from Bahia and Pernambuco
  - Teams which qualified for berth 2 from Alagoas, Maranhão, Paraíba, Piauí, Rio Grande do Norte and Sergipe

Association	Team (Berth)	Entry stage	Qualification method
(Alagoas) Alagoas; 2 berths	CRB (Alagoas 1)	Group stage	2017 Campeonato Alagoano champions
(Alagoas) Alagoas; 2 berths	CSA (Alagoas 2)	Qualifying stage	2017 Campeonato Alagoano runners-up
(Bahia) Bahia; 3 berths	Vitória (Bahia 1)	Group stage	2017 Campeonato Baiano champions
(Bahia) Bahia; 3 berths	Bahia (Bahia 2)	Group stage	2017 Campeonato Baiano runners-up
(Bahia) Bahia; 3 berths	Fluminense de Feira (Bahia 3)	Qualifying stage	2017 Campeonato Baiano 3rd place
(Ceará) Ceará; 2 berths	Ceará (Ceará 1)	Group stage	2017 Campeonato Cearense champions
(Ceará) Ceará; 2 berths	Ferroviário (Ceará 2)	Group stage	2017 Campeonato Cearense runners-up
(Maranhão) Maranhão; 2 berths	Sampaio Corrêa (Maranhão 1)	Group stage	2017 Campeonato Maranhense champions
(Maranhão) Maranhão; 2 berths	Cordino (Maranhão 2)	Qualifying stage	2017 Campeonato Maranhense runners-up
(Paraíba) Paraíba; 2 berths	Botafogo-PB (Paraíba 1)	Group stage	2017 Campeonato Paraibano champions
(Paraíba) Paraíba; 2 berths	Treze (Paraíba 2)	Qualifying stage	2017 Campeonato Paraibano runners-up
Pernambuco^{[a]} 3 berths	Salgueiro (Pernambuco 1)	Group stage	2017 Campeonato Pernambucano runners-up
Pernambuco^{[a]} 3 berths	Santa Cruz (Pernambuco 2)	Group stage	2017 Campeonato Pernambucano 3rd place
Pernambuco^{[a]} 3 berths	Náutico (Pernambuco 3)	Qualifying stage	2017 Campeonato Pernambucano 4th place
(Piauí) Piauí; 2 berths	Altos (Piauí 1)	Group stage	2017 Campeonato Piauiense champions
(Piauí) Piauí; 2 berths	Parnahyba (Piauí 2)	Qualifying stage	2017 Campeonato Piauiense runners-up
(Rio Grande do Norte) Rio Grande do Norte; 2 berths	ABC (Rio Grande do Norte 1)	Group stage	2017 Campeonato Potiguar champions
(Rio Grande do Norte) Rio Grande do Norte; 2 berths	Globo (Rio Grande do Norte 2)	Qualifying stage	2017 Campeonato Potiguar runners-up
(Sergipe) Sergipe; 2 berths	Confiança (Sergipe 1)	Group stage	2017 Campeonato Sergipano champions
(Sergipe) Sergipe; 2 berths	Itabaiana (Sergipe 2)	Qualifying stage	2017 Campeonato Sergipano runners-up

^{a} The Campeonato Pernambucano champions, Sport declined to participate in the Copa do Nordeste. They were replaced by Santa Cruz in the group stage. Náutico (4th place) entered the qualifying stage.

== Schedule ==
The schedule of the competition was as follows.

Qualifying Stage
Match	First leg	Second leg
Parnahyba v CSA	15 August 2017	22 August 2017
Fluminense de Feira v Globo	16 August 2017	24 August 2017
Cordino v Treze	4 January 2018	11 January 2018
Itabaiana v Náutico	8 January 2018	13 January 2018
Group Stage
Round 1:	16–18 January 2018	
Round 2:	30 January–8 February 2018	
Round 3:	10–22 February 2018	
Round 4:	10–12 March 2018	
Round 5:	20–22 March 2018	
Round 6:	27–29 March 2018	
Final Stages
Stage	First leg	Second leg
Quarter-finals	26 April–16 May 2018	3–24 May 2018
Semi-finals	19–21 June 2018	26–28 June 2018
Finals	4 July 2018	7 July 2018

== Draws ==
The draw for the qualifying stage was held on 3 July 2017, 11:00, at the CBF headquarters in Rio de Janeiro.

Teams were seeded by their 2017 CBF ranking (shown in parentheses). The eight teams were drawn into four ties, with the Pot A teams hosting the second leg.

Qualifying stage draw
Pot A	Pot B
(Pernambuco) Náutico^{[1]} (29); (Paraíba) Treze (69); (Rio Grande do Norte) Globo (77); (Alagoas) CSA (90)	(Piauí) Parnahyba (100); (Sergipe) Itabaiana (117); (Bahia) Fluminense de Feira (131); (Maranhão) Cordino (no rank)

^{1} Pernambuco 3 was Santa Cruz at the time of the draw. After the draw, they were promoted to the group stage, being replaced by Náutico in the qualifying stage.

The draw for the group stage was held on 6 September 2017, 21:00, at the Auditório da Federação das Indústrias do Estado do Maranhão (FIEMA) in São Luís.

For the group stage, the 16 teams were drawn into four groups (Groups 1–4) of four containing a team from each of the four pots. Teams were seeded by their 2017 CBF ranking (shown in parentheses) excluding the winners of the qualifying stage, which were allocated to Pot 4.

Group stage draw
Pot 1	Pot 2	Pot 3	Pot 4
(Bahia) Vitória (20); Bahia (21); Ceará (23); (Pernambuco) Santa Cruz (26)	(Rio Grande do Norte) ABC (31); (Maranhão) Sampaio Corrêa (36); (Alagoas) CRB (37); (Paraíba) Botafogo-PB (46)	(Pernambuco) Salgueiro (49); (Sergipe) Confiança (56); (Piauí) Altos (136); (Ceará) Ferroviário (no rank)	(Pernambuco) Náutico^{[2]} (29); (Paraíba) Treze^{[2]} (69); (Rio Grande do Norte) Globo (77); (Alagoas) CSA (90)

^{2} The identity of Treze v Cordino and Náutico v Itabaiana winners were not known at the time of the draw.

== Qualifying stage ==
In the qualifying stage, each tie was played on a home-and-away two-legged basis. If tied on aggregate, the away goals rule would be used. If still tied, extra time would not be played, and the penalty shoot-out would be used to determine the winner (Regulations Article 12).

=== Matches ===
Team 1	Agg.	Team 2	1st leg	2nd leg
Cordino (Maranhão)	1–2	(Paraíba) Treze	1–1	0–1
Itabaiana (Sergipe)	0–0 (4–5 p)	(Pernambuco) Náutico	0–0	0–0
Parnahyba (Piauí)	0–5	(Alagoas) CSA	0–1	0–4
Fluminense de Feira (Bahia)	1–3	(Rio Grande do Norte) Globo	1–1	0–2

== Group stage ==
In the group stage, each group was played on a home-and-away round-robin basis. The teams were ranked according to points (3 points for a win, 1 point for a draw, and 0 points for a loss). If tied on points, the following criteria would be used to determine the ranking: 1. Wins; 2. Goal difference; 3. Goals scored; 4. Head-to-head (if the tie was only between two teams). If tie on aggregate, the away goals rule would be used (except if both teams shared the same stadium); 5. Fewest red cards; 6. Fewest yellow cards; 7. Draw in the headquarters of the Brazilian Football Confederation (Regulations Article 10).

The winners and runners-up of each group advanced to the quarter-finals of the knockout stages.

=== Group A ===
Pos	Team	Pld	W	D	L	GF	GA	GD	Pts	Qualification	SAN	CRB	CON	TRE
1	(Pernambuco) Santa Cruz	6	3	3	0	11	4	+7	12	Quarter-finals		2–1	4–1	3–0
2	(Alagoas) CRB	6	3	2	1	10	7	+3	11	Quarter-finals	1–1		3–1	2–1
3	(Sergipe) Confiança	6	1	2	3	8	13	−5	5		1–1	1–1		2–1
4	(Paraíba) Treze	6	1	1	4	6	11	−5	4		0–0	1–2	3–2	

Source: CBF

=== Group B ===
Pos	Team	Pld	W	D	L	GF	GA	GD	Pts	Qualification	VIT	ABC	GLO	FER
1	(Bahia) Vitória	6	4	1	1	17	10	+7	13	Quarter-finals		3–3	3–1	4–1
2	(Rio Grande do Norte) ABC	6	4	1	1	15	8	+7	13	Quarter-finals	3–1		2–0	3–1
3	(Rio Grande do Norte) Globo	6	2	1	3	5	8	−3	7		1–2	2–1		1–0
4	(Ceará) Ferroviário	6	0	1	5	4	15	−11	1		1–4	1–3	0–0	

Source: CBF

=== Group C ===
Pos	Team	Pld	W	D	L	GF	GA	GD	Pts	Qualification	BAH	BOT	NAU	ALT
1	Bahia	6	4	0	2	11	5	+6	12	Quarter-finals		0–1	2–1	5–2
2	(Paraíba) Botafogo-PB	6	3	1	2	4	4	0	10	Quarter-finals	0–2		2–1	1–0
3	(Pernambuco) Náutico	6	2	2	2	8	8	0	8		1–0	1–0		2–2
4	(Piauí) Altos	6	0	3	3	6	12	−6	3		0–2	0–0	2–2	

Source: CBF

=== Group D ===
Pos	Team	Pld	W	D	L	GF	GA	GD	Pts	Qualification	CEA	SAM	CSA	SAL
1	Ceará	6	4	1	1	12	3	+9	13	Quarter-finals		2–1	1–0	6–0
2	(Maranhão) Sampaio Corrêa	6	2	3	1	7	3	+4	9	Quarter-finals	1–0		0–0	4–0
3	(Alagoas) CSA	6	0	5	1	3	4	−1	5		1–1	1–1		1–1
4	(Pernambuco) Salgueiro	6	0	3	3	1	13	−12	3		0–2	0–0	0–0	

Source: CBF

== Final stages ==
Starting from the quarter-finals, the teams played a single-elimination tournament with the following rules:

- Each tie would be played on a home-and-away two-legged basis, with the higher-seeded team hosting the second leg (Regulations Article 14.a and 15).
- If tied on aggregate, the away goals rule would be used (except if both teams shared the same stadium). If still tied, extra time would not be played, and the penalty shoot-out would be used to determine the winner (Regulations Article 12).

=== Seeding ===
The draw for the quarter-finals was held on 2 April 2018, 12:00, at the CBF headquarters in Rio de Janeiro. The 8 qualified teams were drawn into four ties between a group winner (Pot 1) and a group runner-up (Pot 2), with the group winners hosting the second leg.

Pot 1	Pot 2
(Pernambuco) Santa Cruz; (Bahia) Vitória; Bahia; Ceará	(Alagoas) CRB; (Rio Grande do Norte) ABC; (Paraíba) Botafogo-PB; (Maranhão) Sampaio Corrêa

Starting from the semi-finals, the teams would be seeded according to their performance in the tournament. The teams would be ranked according to overall points. If tied on overall points, the following criteria would be used to determine the ranking: 1. Overall wins; 2. Overall goal difference; 3. Draw in the headquarters of the Brazilian Football Confederation (Regulations Article 15).

=== Bracket ===
Quarter-finals
(Maranhão) Sampaio Corrêa	3	0	3
(Bahia) Vitória	0	0	0
(Rio Grande do Norte) ABC	1	4	5
(Pernambuco) Santa Cruz	0	1	1
(Alagoas) CRB	3	0	3
Ceará (a)	3	0	3
(Paraíba) Botafogo-PB	1	0	1
Bahia	2	0	2

Semi-finals
(Maranhão) Sampaio Corrêa	1	1	2
(Rio Grande do Norte) ABC	0	1	1
Ceará	0	0	0
Bahia	1	0	1

Final
(Maranhão) Sampaio Corrêa	1	0	1
Bahia	0	0	0

=== Quarter-finals ===
Team 1	Agg.	Team 2	1st leg	2nd leg
ABC (Rio Grande do Norte)	5–1	(Pernambuco) Santa Cruz	1–0	4–1
Sampaio Corrêa (Maranhão)	3–0	(Bahia) Vitória	3–0	0–0
CRB (Alagoas)	3–3 (a)	Ceará	3–3	0–0
Botafogo-PB (Paraíba)	1–2	Bahia	1–2	0–0

1 May 2018
21:45

ABC (Rio Grande do Norte)	1–0	(Pernambuco) Santa Cruz
Leandrão 37'	Report

Frasqueirão, Natal
Attendance: 2,172
Referee: Luiz César de Oliveira Magalhães (Ceará)

22 May 2018
19:00

Santa Cruz (Pernambuco)	1–4	(Rio Grande do Norte) ABC
Héricles 84'	Report	Higor Leite 7'; Marcos Júnior 21'; Felipe Guedes 36'; Matheus Carvalho 69'

Estádio do Arruda, Recife
Attendance: 7,950
Referee: Denis da Silva Ribeiro Serafim (Alagoas)

ABC won 5–1 on aggregate and advanced to the semi-finals.

16 May 2018
19:15

Sampaio Corrêa (Maranhão)	3–0	(Bahia) Vitória
Bruninho 32'; Maracás 52'; Alyson 75'	Report

Castelão, São Luís
Attendance: 6,728
Referee: Nielson Nogueira Dias (Pernambuco)

24 May 2018
19:00

Vitória (Bahia)	0–0	(Maranhão) Sampaio Corrêa
	Report

Barradão, Salvador
Attendance: 7,304
Referee: Pablo Ramon Gonçalves Pinheiro (Rio Grande do Norte)

Sampaio Corrêa won 3–0 on aggregate and advanced to the semi-finals.

10 May 2018
21:45

CRB (Alagoas)	3–3	Ceará
Neto Baiano 4', 43', 68'	Report	Naldo 45+1'; Pio 45+2'; Arthur Cabral 89'

Estádio Rei Pelé, Maceió
Attendance: 6,838
Referee: Antônio Dib Moraes de Sousa (Piauí)

23 May 2018
19:00

Ceará	0–0	(Alagoas) CRB
	Report

Castelão, Fortaleza
Attendance: 8,587
Referee: Mayron Frederico dos Reis Novaes (Maranhão)

Tied 3–3 on aggregate, Ceará won on away goals and advanced to the semi-finals.

26 April 2018
21:45

Botafogo-PB (Paraíba)	1–2	Bahia
Marcos Aurélio 49'	Report	Marco Antônio 45'; Régis 74'

Almeidão, João Pessoa
Attendance: 2,952
Referee: Péricles Bassols Pegado Cortez (Pernambuco)

3 May 2018
21:45

Bahia	0–0	(Paraíba) Botafogo-PB
	Report

Estádio de Pituaçu, Salvador
Attendance: 6,992
Referee: Nielson Nogueira Dias (Pernambuco)

Bahia won 2–1 on aggregate and advanced to the semi-finals.

=== Semi-finals ===
Pos	Team	Pld	W	D	L	GF	GA	GD	Pts	Host
1	(Rio Grande do Norte) ABC	8	6	1	1	20	9	+11	19	2nd leg
4	(Maranhão) Sampaio Corrêa	8	3	4	1	10	3	+7	13	1st leg
2	Bahia	8	5	1	2	13	6	+7	16	2nd leg
3	Ceará	8	4	3	1	15	6	+9	15	1st leg

Source: CBF

Team 1	Agg.	Team 2	1st leg	2nd leg
Sampaio Corrêa (Maranhão)	2–1	(Rio Grande do Norte) ABC	1–0	1–1
Ceará	0–1	Bahia	0–1	0–0

19 June 2018
21:45

Sampaio Corrêa (Maranhão)	1–0	(Rio Grande do Norte) ABC
Uilliam 59' (pen.)	Report

Castelão, São Luís
Attendance: 4,826
Referee: Anderson Daronco (Rio Grande do Sul)

28 June 2018
21:45

ABC (Rio Grande do Norte)	1–1	(Maranhão) Sampaio Corrêa
Erivélton 83'	Report	Fernando Sobral 79' (pen.)

Frasqueirão, Natal
Attendance: 3,387
Referee: Péricles Bassols Pegado Cortez (Pernambuco)

Sampaio Corrêa won 2–1 on aggregate and advanced to the finals.

21 June 2018
21:45

Ceará	0–1	Bahia
	Report	Élber 61'

Castelão, Fortaleza
Attendance: 13,894
Referee: Ricardo Marques (Minas Gerais)

26 June 2018
21:45

Bahia	0–0	Ceará
	Report

Arena Fonte Nova, Salvador
Attendance: 16,052
Referee: Denis da Silva Ribeiro Serafim (Alagoas)

Bahia won 1–0 on aggregate and advanced to the finals.

=== Finals ===
Pos	Team	Pld	W	D	L	GF	GA	GD	Pts	Host
1	Bahia	10	6	2	2	14	6	+8	20	2nd leg
2	(Maranhão) Sampaio Corrêa	10	4	5	1	12	4	+8	17	1st leg

Source: CBF

Team 1	Agg.	Team 2	1st leg	2nd leg
Sampaio Corrêa (Maranhão)	1–0	Bahia	1–0	0–0

4 July 2018
21:45

Sampaio Corrêa (Maranhão)	1–0	Bahia
Uilliam 1'	Report

Castelão, São Luís
Attendance: 18,021
Referee: Luiz César de Oliveira Magalhães (Ceará)

7 July 2018
17:45

Bahia	0–0	(Maranhão) Sampaio Corrêa
	Report

Arena Fonte Nova, Salvador
Attendance: 45,378
Referee: Pablo Ramon Gonçalves Pinheiro (Rio Grande do Norte)

2018 Copa do Nordeste
Champions

Sampaio Corrêa
1st title

== Top goalscorers ==
Rank	Player	Team	Goals
1	(Brazil) Arthur Cabral	Ceará	5
1	(Brazil) Yago	(Bahia) Vitória	5
3	(Brazil) Edigar Junio	Bahia	4
3	(Brazil) Matheus Matias	(Rio Grande do Norte) ABC	4
3	(Brazil) Neto Baiano	(Alagoas) CRB	4
3	(Brazil) Uilliam	(Maranhão) Sampaio Corrêa	4
7	(Brazil) Edson Ratinho	(Alagoas) CRB	3
7	(Brazil) Héricles	(Pernambuco) Santa Cruz	3
7	(Brazil) Higor Leite	(Rio Grande do Norte) ABC	3
7	(Brazil) Neilton	(Bahia) Vitória	3
7	(Brazil) Robinho	(Pernambuco) Santa Cruz	3

Source:CBF

== 2018 Copa do Nordeste team ==
The 2018 Copa do Nordeste team was a squad consisting of the eleven most impressive players at the tournament.

Pos.	Player	Team
GK	(Brazil) Andrey ^{a}	(Maranhão) Sampaio Corrêa
DF	(Brazil) Nino Paraíba	Bahia
DF	(Brazil) Joécio	(Maranhão) Sampaio Corrêa
DF	(Brazil) Maracás	(Maranhão) Sampaio Corrêa
DF	(Brazil) Alyson	(Maranhão) Sampaio Corrêa
MF	(Brazil) Fernando Sobral	(Maranhão) Sampaio Corrêa
MF	(Brazil) Régis	Bahia
MF	(Brazil) João Paulo	(Maranhão) Sampaio Corrêa
MF	(Brazil) Marlon	(Maranhão) Sampaio Corrêa
FW	(Brazil) Arthur Cabral ^{b}	Ceará
FW	(Brazil) Uilliam	(Maranhão) Sampaio Corrêa
Head coach	(Brazil) Roberto Fonseca	(Maranhão) Sampaio Corrêa

a. Best player
b. Top scorer (shared with Yago)

Head coach
(Brazil) Roberto Fonseca
