= 2019 Campeonato Paulista knockout stage =

The knockout stage of the 2019 Campeonato Paulista began on 23 March with the quarter-finals concluded on 21 April 2019 with the final. A total of eight teams competed in the knockout stage.

== Round and draw dates ==
All draws were held at Federação Paulista de Futebol headquarters in São Paulo, Brazil.

Round	Draw date	First leg	Second leg
Quarter-finals	21 March 2019	23–24 March 2019	26–27 March 2019
Semi-finals	28 March 2019	30–31 March 2019	7–8 April 2019
Finals	–	14 April 2019	21 April 2019

== Format ==
Each tie was played over two legs, with the team with the better ranking in the general table playing the second leg at home. The quarter-finals were played between the winners and runners-up of each group. In the semi-finals, the best ranked team faced the team with the worst remaining ranking, while the second-placed team face the team with the third- best ranking.

== Qualified teams ==
Group	Winners	Runners-up
A	Red Bull Brasil	Santos
B	Palmeiras	Novorizontino
C	Corinthians	Ferroviária
D	Ituano	São Paulo

== Bracket ==
Quarterfinals
A1	Red Bull Brasil	0	0	0
A2	Santos	2	0	2
C1	Corinthians (p)	1	1	2 (4)
C2	Ferroviária	1	1	2 (3)
B1	Palmeiras	1	5	6
B2	Novorizontino	1	0	1
D1	Ituano	1	0	1
D2	São Paulo	2	1	3

Semifinals
A2	Santos	1	1	2 (6)
C1	Corinthians (p)	2	0	2 (7)
B1	Palmeiras	0	0	0 (4)
D2	São Paulo (p)	0	0	0 (5)

Finals
D2	São Paulo	0	1	1
C1	Corinthians	0	2	2

== Quarterfinals ==
Team 1	Agg.	Team 2	1st leg	2nd leg
Red Bull Brasil	0–2	Santos	0–2	0–0
Palmeiras	6–1	Novorizontino	1–1	5–0
Corinthians	2–2 (4–3 p)	Ferroviária	1–1	1–1
Ituano	1–3	São Paulo	1–2	0–1

=== Quarterfinal A ===
March 23, 2019
19:30 UTC−03:00

Santos	2–0	Red Bull Brasil
Sánchez 11'; Diego Pituca 79'	Report

Pacaembu Stadium, São Paulo
Attendance: 20,615
Referee: Douglas Marques das Flores

March 26, 2019
20:00 UTC−03:00

Red Bull Brasil	0–0	Santos
	Report

Estádio Moisés Lucarelli, Campinas
Attendance: 9,396
Referee: Leandro Bizzio Marinho

=== Quarterfinal B ===
March 23, 2019
17:00 UTC−03:00

Novorizontino	1–1	Palmeiras
Cleo Silva 38'	Report	Arthur 67'

Estádio Dr. Jorge Ismael de Biasi, Novo Horizonte
Attendance: 4,925
Referee: Raphael Claus

March 26, 2019
21:00 UTC−03:00

Palmeiras	5–0	Novorizontino
Felipe Melo 6'; Ricardo Goulart 10'; Gustavo Scarpa 51' (pen.), 77'; Dudu 61' (pen.)	Report

Pacaembu Stadium, São Paulo
Attendance: 26,706
Referee: Vinicius Gonçalves Dias Araujo

=== Quarterfinal C ===
March 24, 2019
19:00 UTC−03:00

Ferroviária	1–1	Corinthians
Diogo Mateus 54'	Report	Gustavo 88'

Estádio Fonte Luminosa, Araraquara
Attendance: 12,998
Referee: Vinicius Furlan

March 27, 2019
21:30 UTC−03:00

Corinthians	1–1	Ferroviária
Júnior Urso 34'	Report	Thiago Santos 60'
Penalties
Gustavo (penalty scored); Clayson (penalty scored); Danilo Avelar (penalty missed); Boselli (penalty scored); Pedrinho (penalty scored)	4–3	(penalty missed) Tony; (penalty missed) Thiago Santos; (penalty scored) Uilliam; (penalty scored) Higor Meritão; (penalty scored) Tadeu

Arena Corinthians, São Paulo
Attendance: 34,488
Referee: Luiz Flavio De Oliveira

=== Quarterfinal D ===
March 24, 2019
16:00 UTC−03:00

São Paulo	2–1	Ituano
Igor Gomes 33', 61'	Report	Morato 83'

Estádio do Morumbi, São Paulo
Attendance: 18,573
Referee: José Cláudio Rocha Filho

March 27, 2019
19:15 UTC−03:00

Ituano	0–1	São Paulo
	Report	Liziero 72'

Estádio Novelli Júnior, Itu
Attendance: 9,028
Referee: Flavio Rodrigues De Souza

== Semifinals ==
Team 1	Agg.	Team 2	1st leg	2nd leg
Santos	2–2 (6–7 p)	Corinthians	1–2	1–0
Palmeiras	0–0 (4–5 p)	São Paulo	0–0	0–0

=== Semifinal A ===
March 31, 2019
16:00 UTC−03:00

Corinthians	2–1	Santos
Manoel 4'; Clayson 32'	Report	González 8'

Arena Corinthians, São Paulo
Attendance: 39,919
Referee: Vinícius Gonçalves Dias Araújo

April 8, 2019
20:00 UTC−03:00

Santos	1–0	Corinthians
Gustavo Henrique 85'	Report
Penalties
Rodrygo (penalty scored); Kaio Jorge (penalty missed); Soteldo (penalty scored); Sánchez (penalty scored); González (penalty scored); Diego Pituca (penalty scored); Alison (penalty scored); Victor Ferraz (penalty missed)	6–7	(penalty missed) Boselli; (penalty scored) Vágner Love; (penalty scored) Ramiro; (penalty scored) Júnior Urso; (penalty scored) Fagner; (penalty scored) Sornoza; (penalty scored) Avelar; (penalty scored) Henrique

Pacaembu Stadium, São Paulo
Attendance: 38,542
Referee: Raphael Claus

=== Semifinal B ===
March 30, 2019
18:00 UTC−03:00

São Paulo	0–0	Palmeiras
	Report

Estádio do Morumbi, São Paulo
Attendance: 43,202
Referee: Vinicius Furlan

April 7, 2019
16:00 UTC−03:00

Palmeiras	0–0	São Paulo
	Report
Penalties
Bruno Henrique (penalty scored); Gómez (penalty scored); Goulart (penalty missed); Luan (penalty scored); Diogo Barbosa (penalty scored); Zé Rafael (penalty missed)	4–5	(penalty scored) Nenê; (penalty scored) Everton Felipe; (penalty scored) Hudson; (penalty scored) Carneiro; (penalty missed) Volpi; (penalty scored) Bruno Alves

Allianz Parque, São Paulo
Attendance: 39,751
Referee: Flavio Rodrigues de Souza

== Finals ==
Team 1	Agg.	Team 2	1st leg	2nd leg
São Paulo	1–2	Corinthians	0–0	1–2

=== First leg ===
14 April 2019
16:00 UTC−03:00

São Paulo	0−0	Corinthians
	Report

Estádio do Morumbi, São Paulo
Attendance: 58,713
Referee: Luiz Flávio de Oliveira

=== Second leg ===
21 April 2019
16:00 UTC−03:00

Corinthians	2–1	São Paulo
Avelar 30'; Vágner Love 88'	Report	Antony 45+2'

Arena Corinthians, São Paulo
Attendance: 46,481
Referee: Raphael Claus
