= Fernando Sobral =

Brazilian footballer (born 1994)

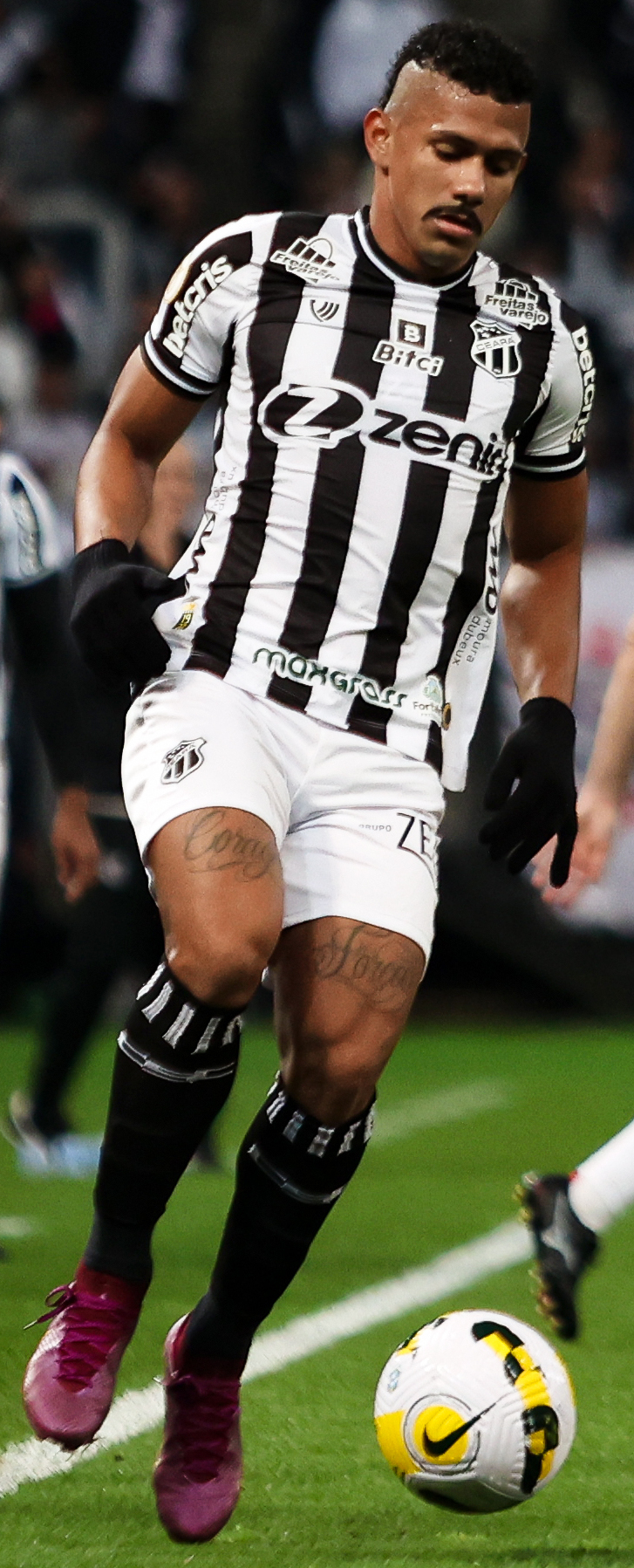
- Sobral with Ceará in 2022

Personal information
- Full name: Fernando Pereira do Nascimento
- Date of birth: 17 December 1994 (age 31)
- Place of birth: Rio de Janeiro, Brazil
- Height: 1.78 m (5 ft 10 in)
- Position: Midfielder

Team information
- Current team: Sport Recife
- Number: 88

Youth career
- Guarany de Sobral

Senior career*
Years	Team	Apps	(Gls)
2012–2013	Guarany de Sobral	37	(0)
2014–2016	Horizonte	25	(3)
2014	→ Icasa (loan)	4	(0)
2015	→ Guarany de Sobral (loan)	14	(4)
2015	→ Atlético Goianiense (loan)	1	(0)
2015	→ Floresta (loan)	14	(3)
2016	→ Fluminense de Feira (loan)	12	(2)
2017	Fluminense de Feira	12	(2)
2017–2018	Sampaio Corrêa	49	(6)
2019–2022	Ceará	121	(5)
2023–2026	Cuiabá	66	(3)
2025	→ Ceará (loan)	38	(2)
2026	→ Coritiba (loan)	12	(0)
2026–	Sport Recife	8	(0)
- * Club domestic league appearances and goals as of 16 November 2026

Fernando Pereira do Nascimento (born 17 December 1994), known as Fernando Sobral, is a Brazilian footballer who plays for Sport Recife as a midfielder.

== Club career ==
=== Early career ===
Born in Rio de Janeiro, Sobral was a Guarany de Sobral youth graduate. He made his first team debut on 26 July 2012, coming on as a second-half substitute in a 3–0 Copa Fares Lopes home win against Ferroviário.

Sobral scored his first senior goal on 17 October 2013, netting the opener in a 1–1 away draw against the same opponent, also for the state cup. For the 2014 season, he joined Horizonte and was an undisputed starter during the Campeonato Cearense.

In the middle of 2014, Sobral was loaned to Série B side Icasa until the end of the year. He made his professional debut on 13 September, starting in a 1–1 home draw against Joinville; he contributed rarely as his side suffered relegation.

Ahead of the 2015 campaign, Sobral returned to hometown club Guarany, being again first-choice. On 20 March of that year he moved to Atlético Goianiense also in a temporary deal, but featured in only one match for the club.

On 22 January 2016, after a short stint at Floresta, Sobral signed for Fluminense de Feira, still owned by Horizonte. He returned to his parent club for the remainder of the season, but rejoined Flu in January 2017.

=== Sampaio Corrêa ===
On 8 May 2017, Sobral was announced at Sampaio Corrêa in the Série C. An immediate starter, he contributed with three goals as his side achieved promotion to the second division.

Sobral was also an undisputed first-choice during the 2018 campaign, winning the year's Copa do Nordeste.

=== Ceará ===
On 22 December 2018, Sobral agreed to a contract with Série A side Ceará. He made his top tier debut the following 28 April, replacing Ricardinho in a 4–0 home routing of CSA.

=== Cuiabá ===
On 8 December 2022, after Ceará's relegation, Sobral signed a four-year contract with Cuiabá in the top tier.

== Career statistics ==
As of 26 February 2023.

Club	Season	League			State League		Cup		Continental		Other		Total	
Club	Season	Division	Apps	Goals	Apps	Goals	Apps	Goals	Apps	Goals	Apps	Goals	Apps	Goals
Guarany de Sobral	2012	Série C	3	0	—		—		—		4 (Note: Appearance(s) in Copa Fares Lopes)	0	7	0
Guarany de Sobral	2013	Série D	5	0	29	0	—		—		7	2	41	2
Guarany de Sobral	Total		8	0	29	0	0	0	0	0	11	2	48	2
Horizonte	2014	Cearense	—		25	3	2	0	—		—		27	3
Horizonte	2016	Cearense Série B	—		0	0	—		—		10	0	10	0
Horizonte	Total		0	0	25	3	2	0	0	0	10	0	37	3
Icasa (loan)	2014	Série B	4	0	—		—		—		0	0	4	0
Guarany de Sobral (loan)	2015	Cearense	—		14	4	—		—		—		14	4
Atlético Goianiense (loan)	2015	Série B	0	0	1	0	0	0	—		—		1	0
Floresta (loan)	2015	Cearense Série C	—		14	3	—		—		—		14	3
Fluminense de Feira (loan)	2016	Série D	0	0	12	2	—		—		—		12	2
Fluminense de Feira	2017	Série D	0	0	12	2	—		—		—		12	2
Sampaio Corrêa	2017	Série C	12	3	—		—		—		—		12	3
Sampaio Corrêa	2018	Série B	32	3	5	0	4	0	—		13 (Note: 12 appearances and two goals in 2018 Copa do Nordeste, one appearance in 2019 Pré-Copa do Nordeste)	2	54	5
Sampaio Corrêa	Total		44	6	5	0	4	0	0	0	13	2	66	8
Ceará	2019	Série A	13	0	5	0	2	0	—		4 (Note: Appearance(s) in Copa do Nordeste)	1	24	1
Ceará	2020	Série A	34	2	5	0	9	1	—		7	1	55	4
Ceará	2021	Série A	36	0	5	2	2	0	4 (Note: Appearance(s) in Copa Sudamericana)	0	5	0	52	2
Ceará	2022	Série A	23	1	0	0	3	0	6	0	4	0	36	1
Ceará	Total		106	3	15	2	16	1	10	0	20	2	167	8
Cuiabá	2023	Série A	0	0	8	2	0	0	—		—		8	2
Career total			162	9	135	18	22	1	10	0	54	6	383	34

== Honours ==
Icasa

- Copa Fares Lopes: 2014

Sampaio Corrêa

- Copa do Nordeste: 2018

Ceará

- Copa do Nordeste: 2020
- Campeonato Cearense: 2025

Cuiabá

- Campeonato Mato-Grossense: 2023, 2024
