= Vila Olímpica Elzir Cabral =

Multi-use stadium in Fortaleza, Brazil

Coordinates: 03°42′31″S 38°35′18″W

- Fortim do Ferrão
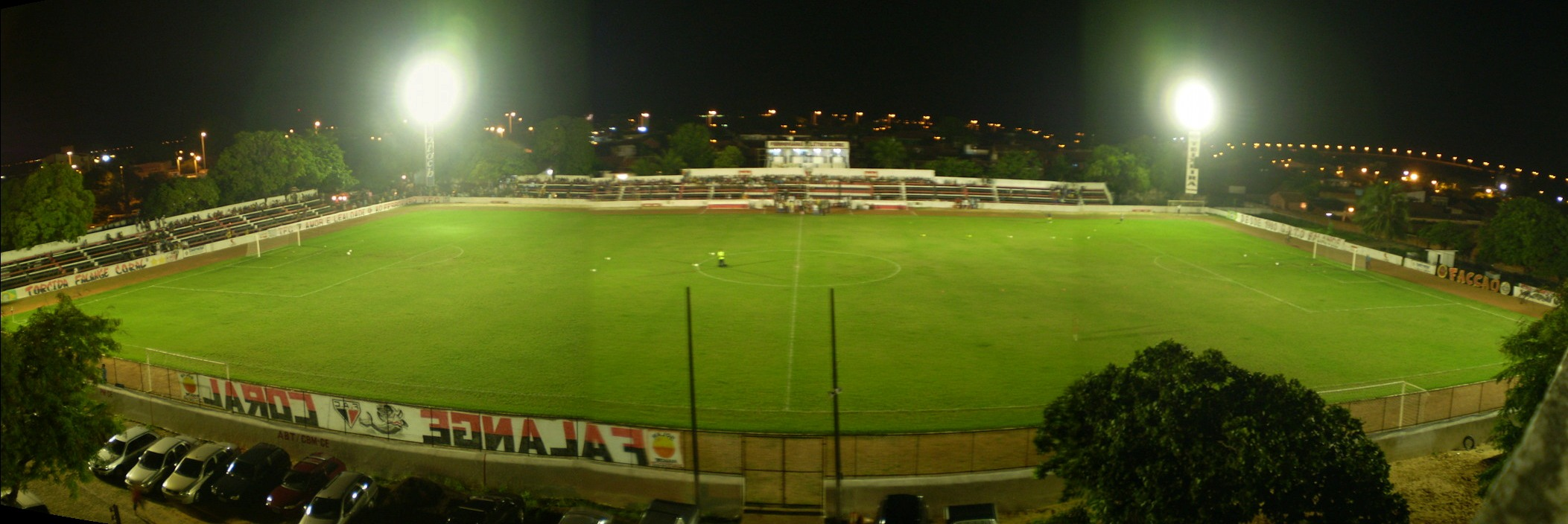
- Interactive map of Vila Olímpica Elzir Cabral
- Location: Fortaleza, Brazil
- Owner: Ferroviário Atlético Clube
- Capacity: 8,000
- Surface: Grass

Construction
- Opened: March 19, 1989

Tenant
- Ferroviário Atlético Clube

Vila Olímpica Elzir Cabral, also known as Fortim do Ferrão (Ferrão's Fort) or just Elzir Cabral, is a multi-use stadium located in Fortaleza, Brazil. It is used mostly for football matches and hosts the home matches of Ferroviário Atlético Clube, which own the stadium. The stadium has a maximum capacity of 8,000 people and was built in 1989.

The stadium is the first private stadium in Ceará state recognized by the Brazilian Football Confederation as being able to host official matches and competitions. It is named after Elzir Cabral, who was Ferroviário's president and bought the land which the stadium was built.

== History ==
The stadium was built during the 1960s and the 1970s, after a groundplot was acquired by Ferroviário's board of directors.

The stadium was inaugurated on March 19, 1989, when Ferroviário beat Guarani 6–0. The stadium's attendance record currently stands at 4,679, set on that match.
