= Régis (footballer, born 1992) =

Brazilian footballer

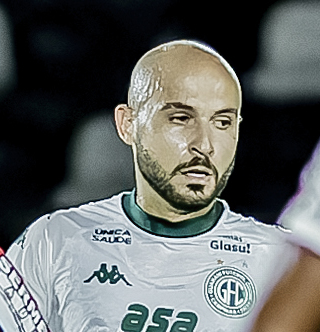
- Régis in 2024

Personal information
- Full name: Régis Augusto Salmazzo
- Date of birth: 30 November 1992 (age 33)
- Place of birth: Jales, Brazil
- Height: 1.70 m (5 ft 7 in)
- Position: Attacking midfielder

Youth career
- 2004–2012: São Paulo

Senior career*
Years	Team	Apps	(Gls)
2013–2014	São Paulo	2	(0)
2013	→ Paulista (loan)	6	(0)
2013	→ America-RN (loan)	10	(5)
2014	→ Chapecoense (loan)	16	(8)
2014–2016	Sport Recife	62	(9)
2016	→ Palmeiras (loan)	4	(0)
2016	→ Bahia (loan)	26	(4)
2017–2020	Bahia	92	(19)
2018–2019	→ Al-Wehda (loan)	0	(0)
2019	→ Corinthians (loan)	7	(0)
2020	→ Cruzeiro (loan)	29	(3)
2021	Guarani	36	(9)
2022–2023	Coritiba	42	(1)
2023–2024	Guarani	35	(2)
2024–2025	Goiás	27	(1)
2025	Remo	17	(1)
- * Club domestic league appearances and goals as of 15 December 2025

Régis Augusto Salmazzo (born 30 November 1992), simply known as Régis, is a Brazilian professional footballer who plays as an attacking midfielder.

== Club career ==
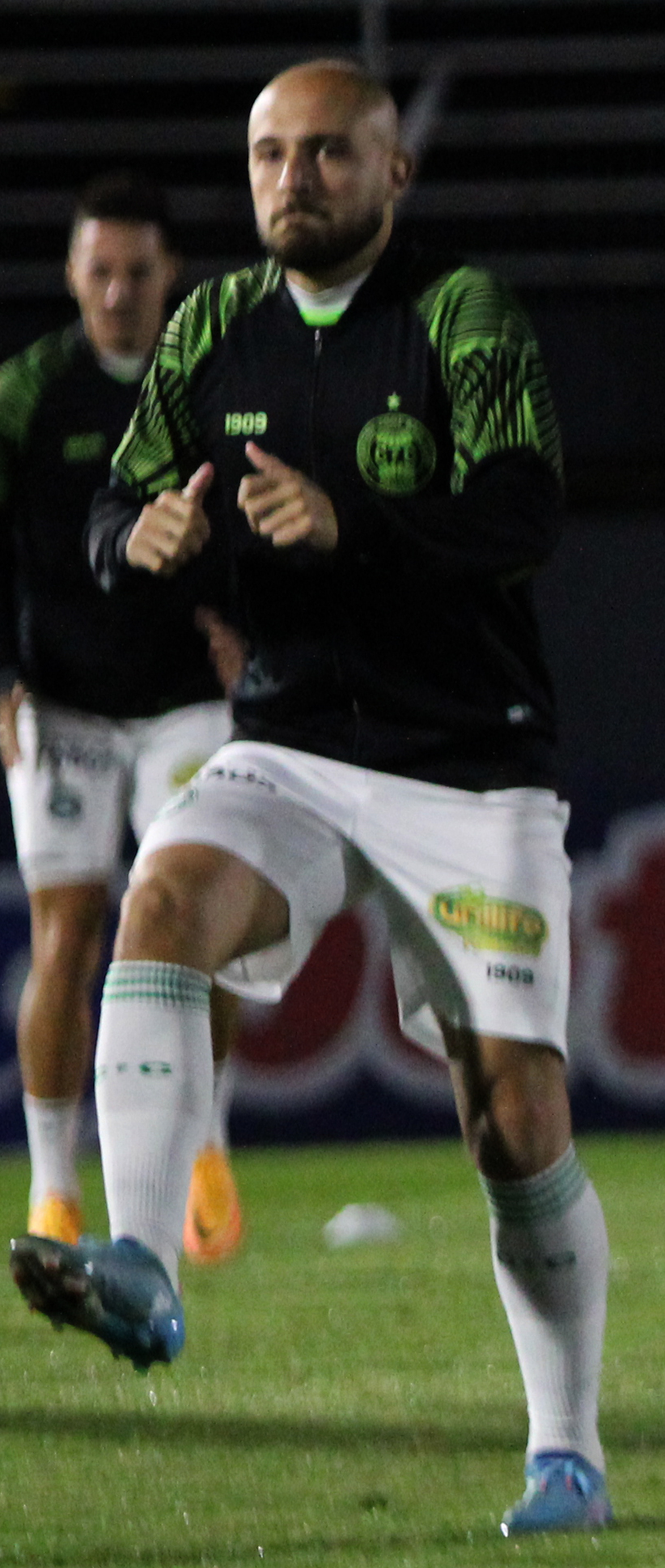
Régis with Coritiba in 2022

=== São Paulo and loans ===
Born in Jales, São Paulo, Régis was a São Paulo youth graduate. He was loaned to Paulista ahead of the 2013 season, and made his senior debut on 20 January of that year by coming on as a substitute in a 1–1 Campeonato Paulista home draw against Corinthians.

On 27 September 2013 Régis was loaned to América-RN, in the Série B. He scored his first professional goal on 12 November, netting the first in a 2–2 home draw against América Mineiro, and contributed with five goals in ten appearances before returning to Tricolor.

=== Chapecoense / Sport Recife ===
On 23 January 2014, Régis was sold to an investment fund, being assigned to Chapecoense for six months. On 2 July, however, after being the top goalscorer of the year's Campeonato Catarinense, he signed a four-year deal with Sport.

Régis scored his first Série A goal on 17 August 2014, netting the equalizer in a 1–1 home draw against Atlético Paranaense. He started to feature more regularly the following year, mainly as a substitute to Diego Souza and Marlone.

On 18 December 2015, Régis signed a one-year loan deal with Palmeiras, who overcame Santos for his signature.

=== Bahia ===
Régis was rarely used at Verdão, and moved to Bahia the following 24 May, on an 18-month loan deal. He signed a permanent contract with the club in 2018, and in March 2019, after a temporary deal at Al-Wehda, he joined Corinthians on loan until December.

== Career statistics ==
As of 27 November 2019

Club	Season	League			State League		Cup		Continental		Other		Total	
Club	Season	Division	Apps	Goals	Apps	Goals	Apps	Goals	Apps	Goals	Apps	Goals	Apps	Goals
Paulista	2013	Paulista	—		6	0	—		—		—		6	0
América-RN	2013	Série B	10	5	—		—		—		—		10	5
Chapecoense	2014	Série A	5	0	9	8	1	0	—		—		15	8
Sport	2014	Série A	6	1	—		—		0	0	—		6	1
Sport	2015	Série A	26	3	12	1	6	3	3 (Note: Appearance(s) in Copa Sudamericana)	0	10 (Note: Appearance(s) in Copa do Nordeste)	1	57	8
Sport	Subtotal		32	4	12	1	6	3	3	0	10	1	63	9
Palmeiras (loan)	2016	Série A	0	0	4	0	0	0	0	0	—		4	0
Bahia (loan)	2016	Série B	26	4	—		—		—		—		26	4
Bahia (loan)	2017	Série A	29	4	7	2	2	1	—		11	6	49	13
Bahia	2018	Série A	18	3	8	1	4	0	4	1	9	1	43	6
Bahia	Subtotal		73	11	15	3	6	1	4	1	20	7	118	23
Al-Wehda (loan)	2018–19	Saudi Professional League	0	0	—		—		—		—		0	0
Corinthians (loan)	2019	Série A	5	0	0	0	1	0	1	0	—		7	0
Total			125	20	46	12	14	4	8	1	30	8	223	45

== Honours ==
Bahia

- Copa do Nordeste: 2017
- Campeonato Baiano: 2018

Corinthians

- Campeonato Paulista: 2019

Coritiba

- Campeonato Paranaense: 2022
