= Diogo Mateus (footballer) =

Brazilian footballer (born 1993)

Personal information
- Full name: Diogo Mateus de Almeida Maciel
- Date of birth: February 13, 1993 (age 33)
- Place of birth: São Paulo, Brazil
- Height: 1.73 m (5 ft 8 in)
- Position: Right back

Team information
- Current team: Botafogo-PB
- Number: 2

Youth career
- 2009–2013: Internacional

Senior career*
Years	Team	Apps	(Gls)
2014	Internacional	10	(0)
2012–2013	→ Porto B (loan)	12	(0)
2013–2014	→ Portimonense (loan)	1	(0)
2015–2017	Vitória	44	(2)
2016	→ Ponte Preta (loan)	0	(0)
2017	Criciúma	25	(1)
2018–2021	Ferroviária	29	(2)
2018	→ CRB (loan)	27	(0)
2019	→ Coritiba (loan)	29	(0)
2020	→ Kawasaki Frontale (loan)	3	(0)
2021–2024	Guarani	113	(8)
2025–2026	Operário Ferroviário	32	(0)
2026	→ Capivariano (loan)	7	(0)
2026–	Botafogo-PB	18	(0)
- * Club domestic league appearances and goals as of 8 November 2026

Diogo Mateus de Almeida Maciel (born February 13, 1993) is a Brazilian footballer who plays as a right back for Botafogo-PB.

== Career ==
Diogo Mateus came through the youth ranks with Internacional. During the 2012–13 seasons, whilst with the Under-23 side, he had a loan spell with Porto B, making his senior debut on 18 August 2012 against União Madeira. He stayed in Portugal with Portimonense, signing a loan deal for the 2013–14 season, however this was not a success, and he played in only one game before returning to Brazil prematurely in December.

In 2014 he was made part of the squad for 2014 Campeonato Brasileiro Série A, and made his top-flight debut against Botafogo on 27 April. In May 2015 he joined Vitória on loan. He became first choice in his position as the team won promotion from 2015 Campeonato Brasileiro Série B. He was unable to agree a deal beyond the end of his loan spell with the club, and signed instead for Ponte Preta in March 2016. However, he could not break into the first team, and by August 2016 he had returned to Vitória, on loan until the end of the season. He returned to Ponte Preta, but was not registered for the 2017 edition of Campeonato Paulista, and in February he signed for Criciúma, with a desire to achieve another promotion from Série B.

In December 2017 he signed for Ferroviária for 2018 Campeonato Paulista. At the end of the campaign he renewed his contract with the club, but was not registered for their Série D campaign, being loaned instead to CRB in April for their 2018 Campeonato Brasileiro Série B campaign. In April 2019, after spending the 2019 Campeonato Paulista campaign with Ferroviária, he signed another loan agreement with Coritiba.

== Career statistics ==
As of 10 October 2020

Club	Season	League			State League		Cup		Continental		Other		Total	
Club	Season	Division	Apps	Goals	Apps	Goals	Apps	Goals	Apps	Goals	Apps	Goals	Apps	Goals
Porto B (loan)	2012–13	Segunda Liga	15	0	—		—		—		—		15	0
Portimonense (loan)	2013–14	Segunda Liga	1 (Note: Reliable sources differ on this Portimonense appearance. Soccerway does not show it, but it is cited in the section above. Sources which Wikipedia does not see as reliable, such as Transfermarkt, suggest it may have been the game against Covilhã on 6 April 2014.)	0	—		—		—		—		1	0
Internacional	2014	Série A	7	0	2	0	1	0	—		—		10	0
Vitória (loan)	2015	Série B	29	2	—		1	0	—		—		30	2
Vitória (loan)	2016	Série A	15	0	—		—		2 (Note: Appearances in 2016 Copa Sudamericana.)	0	—		17	0
Criciúma	2017	Série B	25	1	9	0	2	0	—		1 (Note: Appearance in 2017 Primeira Liga.)	0	37	1
Ferroviária	2018	Paulista	—		7	1	—		—		—		7	1
Ferroviária	2019	Paulista	—		13	1	—		—		—		13	1
Ferroviária	Total		—		20	2	—		—		—		20	2
CRB (loan)	2018	Série B	23	0	—		0	0	—		4 (Note: 2 appearances in 2018 Copa do Nordeste and 2 appearances in 2019 Pré-Copa do Nordeste.)	0	27	0
Coritiba (loan)	2019	Série B	7	0	—		—		—		—		7	0
Kawasaki Frontale (loan)	2020	J1 League	3	0	0	0	0	0	—		—		3	0
Career total			125	3	31	2	4	0	2	0	5	0	167	5

== Honours ==
=== Club ===
- J1 League: 2020
