= 2019 Campeonato Paulista =

Campeonato Paulista - Série A1
- Season: 2019
- Dates: 19 January – 21 April
- Teams: 16
- Champions: Corinthians
- Relegated: São Caetano; São Bento
- Matches: 121
- Goals: 260 (2.15 per match)
- Top goalscorer: Jean Mota (7 goals)
- Biggest home win: Palmeiras 5–0 Novorizontino
- Biggest away win: São Bento 0–4 Santos
- Highest scoring: São Caetano 4–4 Bragantino (8 goals)
- Longest winning run: 4 games Santos (1st round - 4th round); Red Bull Brasil (9th round - 12th round)
- Longest unbeaten run: 11 games Palmeiras (6th round - 16th round)
- Longest winless run: 11 games São Bento (1st round - 11th round)
- Longest losing run: 5 games Bragantino (9th round - 13th round)

The 2019 Campeonato Paulista de Futebol Profissional da Primeira Divisão - Série A1 was the 118th season of São Paulo's top professional football league. Corinthians became the champion.

== Format ==
- In the first stage the sixteen teams were drawn, with seeding, into four groups of four teams each, with each team playing once against the twelve clubs from the other three groups. After each team had played twelve matches, the top two teams of each group qualified for the quarter-final stage.
- After the completion of the first stage, the two clubs with the lowest number of points, regardless of the group, were relegated to the Campeonato Paulista Série A2.
- Quarter-finals, semi-finals and finals were played in a two-legged home and away fixture, with the best placed first stage team playing the second leg at home.
- In case of a draw in any knockout stage match, the winner was decided via a penalty shoot-out.
- The two highest-placed teams not otherwise qualified qualified for the 2020 Copa do Brasil.
- The top three highest-placed teams in the general table at the end of the competition who were not playing in any level of the national Brazilian football league system qualified for the 2020 Campeonato Brasileiro Série D. The clubs eligible for promotion were Red Bull Brasil, São Caetano, Novorizontino, Ferroviária, Mirassol, and Ituano.

=== Tiebreakers ===
The teams were ranked according to points (3 points for a win, 1 point for a draw, 0 points for a loss). If two or more teams were equal on points on completion of the group matches, the following criteria were applied to determine the rankings:

1. Higher number of wins;
2. Superior goal difference;
3. Higher number of goals scored;
4. Fewest red cards received;
5. Fewest yellow cards received;
6. Draw in the headquarters of the FPF.

== Teams ==
Club	Home city	Manager	2018 result
Botafogo-SP	Ribeirão Preto	Roberto Cavalo	8th
Bragantino	Bragança Paulista	Marcelo Veiga	6th
Corinthians	São Paulo (Tatuapé)	Fábio Carille	1st
Ferroviária	Araraquara	Vinicius Munhoz	11th
Guarani	Campinas	Osmar Loss	1st (Série A2)
Ituano	Itu	Vinícius Bergantin	10th
Mirassol	Mirassol	Moisés Egert	14th
Novorizontino	Novo Horizonte	Roberto Fonseca	5th
Oeste	Itápolis	Renan Freitas	2nd (Série A2)
Palmeiras	São Paulo (Perdizes)	Felipão	2nd
Ponte Preta	Campinas	Jorginho	13th
Red Bull Brasil	Campinas	Antônio Carlos Zago	12th
Santos	Santos	Jorge Sampaoli	4th
São Bento	Sorocaba	Silas	9th
São Caetano	São Caetano do Sul	Pintado	7th
São Paulo	São Paulo (Morumbi)	Vágner Mancini	3rd

Source: Regulamento do Paulistão 2019

== First stage ==
=== Group A ===
Pos	Team	Pld	W	D	L	GF	GA	GD	Pts	Qualification or relegation
1	Red Bull Brasil	12	8	3	1	19	10	+9	27	Knockout stage
2	Santos	12	7	2	3	19	13	+6	23	Knockout stage
3	Ponte Preta	12	5	4	3	13	7	+6	19	
4	São Caetano (R)	12	1	5	6	12	21	−9	8	Relegation to Série A2

Source: Soccerway
(R) Relegated

=== Group B ===
Pos	Team	Pld	W	D	L	GF	GA	GD	Pts	Qualification or relegation
1	Palmeiras	12	7	4	1	13	5	+8	25	Knockout stage
2	Novorizontino	12	5	5	2	10	9	+1	20	Knockout stage
3	Guarani	12	4	2	6	13	18	−5	14	
4	São Bento (R)	12	1	4	7	8	18	−10	7	Relegation to Série A2

Source: Soccerway
(R) Relegated

=== Group C ===
Pos	Team	Pld	W	D	L	GF	GA	GD	Pts	Qualification or relegation
1	Corinthians	12	6	3	3	10	8	+2	21	Knockout stage
2	Ferroviária	12	4	6	2	12	9	+3	18	Knockout stage
3	Mirassol	12	2	5	5	9	18	−9	11	
4	Bragantino	12	2	4	6	11	21	−10	10	

Source: Soccerway

=== Group D ===
Pos	Team	Pld	W	D	L	GF	GA	GD	Pts	Qualification or relegation
1	Ituano	12	5	2	5	19	12	+7	17	Knockout stage
2	São Paulo	12	4	3	5	13	10	+3	15	Knockout stage
3	Oeste	12	3	4	5	13	14	−1	13	
4	Botafogo–SP	12	3	2	7	14	15	−1	11	

Source: Soccerway

== Knockout stage ==
=== Bracket ===
Quarterfinals
A1	Red Bull Brasil	0	0	0
A2	Santos	2	0	2
C1	Corinthians	1	1	2 (4)
C2	Ferroviária	1	1	2 (3)
B1	Palmeiras	1	5	6
B2	Novorizontino	1	0	1
D1	Ituano	1	0	1
D2	São Paulo	2	1	3

Semifinals
A2	Santos	1	1	2 (6)
C1	Corinthians	2	0	2 (7)
B1	Palmeiras	0	0	0 (4)
D2	São Paulo	0	0	0 (5)

Finals
C1	Corinthians	0	2	2
D2	São Paulo	0	1	1

== Campeonato do Interior ==
Quarterfinals
10	Guarani	0	2	2
13	Mirassol	2	2	4
9	Ponte Preta	1	1	2
14	Bragantino	0	1	1
11	Oeste	1	3	4 (4)
12	Botafogo–SP	1	3	4 (3)

Semifinals
1	Red Bull Brasil	1	3	4
13	Mirassol	0	1	1
9	Ponte Preta	2	2	4
11	Oeste	2	0	2

Finals
1	Red Bull Brasil	0 (3)
9	Ponte Preta	0 (1)

== Overall table ==
Pos	Team	Pld	W	D	L	GF	GA	GD	Pts	Qualification or relegation
1	Corinthians (C)	16	7	5	4	14	12	+2	26	Finalists
2	São Paulo	16	6	5	5	16	11	+5	23	Finalists
3	Palmeiras	16	8	7	1	19	6	+13	31	Eliminated in the semifinals
4	Santos	16	9	3	4	23	15	+8	30	Eliminated in the semifinals
5	Red Bull Brasil	14	8	4	2	19	12	+7	28	Eliminated in the quarterfinals
6	Novorizontino (B)	14	5	6	3	11	15	−4	21	Eliminated in the quarterfinals
7	Ferroviária (B)	14	4	8	2	14	11	+3	20	Eliminated in the quarterfinals
8	Ituano	14	5	2	7	20	15	+5	17	Eliminated in the quarterfinals
9	Ponte Preta	12	5	4	3	13	7	+6	19	
10	Guarani	12	4	2	6	13	18	−5	14	
11	Oeste	12	3	4	5	13	14	−1	13	
12	Botafogo-SP	12	3	2	7	14	15	−1	11	
13	Mirassol (B)	12	2	5	5	9	18	−9	11	
14	Bragantino	12	2	4	6	11	21	−10	10	
15	São Caetano (R)	12	1	5	6	12	21	−9	8	Relegation to Série A2
16	São Bento (R)	12	1	4	7	8	18	−10	7	Relegation to Série A2

Source: Soccerway
Rules for classification: 1st points; 2nd wins; 3rd goal difference; 4th goals scored; 5th head-to-head results; 6th least red cards received; 7th least yellow cards received; 8th draw.
(B) Qualification for the Campeonato Brasileiro Série D; (C) Champions; (R) Relegated

== Awards ==
=== Team of the Year ===
Pos.	Player	Club
GK	(Brazil) Cássio	Corinthians
DF	(Brazil) Victor Ferraz	Santos
DF	(Brazil) Gustavo Henrique	Santos
DF	(Brazil) Bruno Alves	São Paulo
DF	(Brazil) Danilo Avelar	Corinthians
MF	(Brazil) Júnior Urso	Corinthians
MF	(Brazil) Diego Pituca	Santos
MF	(Brazil) Jean Mota	Santos
FW	(Brazil) Gabriel Martinelli	Ituano
FW	(Brazil) Gustavo	Corinthians
FW	(Brazil) Dudu	Palmeiras
Manager	(Brazil) Antônio Carlos Zago	Red Bull Brasil

Player of the Year

The Player of the Year was awarded to Jean Mota of Santos.

Young Player of the Year

The Young Player of the Year was awarded to Gabriel Martinelli of Ituano.

Countryside Best Player of the Year

The Countryside Best Player of the Year was awarded to Gabriel Martinelli of Ituano.

Top Scorer of the Season

The top scorer of the season was Jean Mota, who scored seven goals for Santos.

== Top scorers ==
Rank	Player	Club	Goals
1	(Brazil) Diego Cardoso	Guarani	7
1	(Brazil) Jean Mota	Santos	7
1	(Brazil) Rafael Costa	Botafogo-SP	7
1	(Brazil) Ytalo	Red Bull Brasil	7
5	(Brazil) Gabriel Martinelli	Ituano	6
5	(Brazil) Matheus Jesus	Oeste	6
5	(Brazil) Morato	Ituano	6
8	(Paraguay) Derlis González	Santos	5
8	(Brazil) Thalles	Ponte Preta	5
