= 2018 Sport Club Corinthians Paulista season =

Corinthians
2018 season
- President: Roberto de Andrade (until February 2); Andrés Sánchez (from February 3)
- Manager: Fábio Carille (until May 22); Osmar Loss (May 22 – September 5); Jair Ventura (from September 6)
- Stadium: Arena Corinthians
- Série A: 13th
- Copa do Brasil: Runners-up
- Campeonato Paulista: Winners
- Copa Libertadores: Round of 16
- Top goalscorer: League: Ángel Romero (6); All: Jádson (15)
- Highest home attendance: 46,571 vs Cruzeiro (17 October)
- Lowest home attendance: 14,762 vs São Bento (14 February)
- Average home league attendance: 31,612
Home colors	Away colors	Third colors

The 2018 season was the 109th season in the history of Sport Club Corinthians Paulista.

== Background ==
=== Kits ===
- Home (May 2018 onward): White shirt, black shorts and white socks;
- Away (May 2018 onward): Black shirt, white shorts and black socks;
- Third (October 2018 onward): Black and gold shirt, black shorts and black socks.

=== Previous Kits ===
- Home (Until April 2018): White shirt, black shorts and white socks.
- Away (Until April 2018): Black shirt, white shorts and black socks.
- Third (Until September 2018): Dark grey shirt, dark grey shorts and dark grey socks.

=== Squad ===
As of 22 August 2018

Note: Flags indicate national team as defined under FIFA eligibility rules; some limited exceptions apply. Players may hold more than one non-FIFA nationality.

No.	Pos.	Nation	Player
1	GK	BRA	Caíque França
2	MF	BRA	Guilherme Mantuan
3	DF	BRA	Henrique
5	MF	BRA	Gabriel
7	FW	BRA	Jonathas (on loan from Hannover 96)
8	MF	BRA	Renê Júnior
9	FW	BRA	Roger
10	MF	BRA	Jádson
11	FW	PAR	Ángel Romero
12	GK	BRA	Cássio (captain)
13	DF	BRA	Marllon
14	DF	BRA	Léo Santos
15	MF	BRA	Ralf
16	MF	CHI	Ángelo Araos (on loan from Universidad de Chile)
17	MF	BRA	Thiaguinho (on loan from Nacional-SP)
20	MF	BRA	Danilo

No.	Pos.	Nation	Player
21	FW	PAR	Sergio Díaz (on loan from Real Madrid)
22	MF	BRA	Mateus Vital
23	DF	BRA	Fagner
25	FW	BRA	Clayson
27	GK	BRA	Walter
28	MF	BRA	Paulo Roberto
29	FW	BRA	Matheus Matias
30	MF	BRA	Douglas
32	MF	BRA	Rodrigo Figueiredo
33	DF	BRA	Carlos Augusto
34	DF	BRA	Pedro Henrique
35	DF	BRA	Danilo Avelar (on loan from Torino)
37	DF	BRA	Vilson
38	MF	BRA	Pedrinho
40	GK	BRA	Filipe
47	FW	QAT	Emerson Sheik

=== Managerial changes ===
On May 22, Fábio Carille accepted an offer from Saudi club Al-Wehda to become their manager. Assistant manager Osmar Loss then assumed as the new manager.

On September 5, Loss was dismissed after losing an away match against Ceará. It was announced that he would remain in the technical staff as an assistant coach. The next day, Jair Ventura was announced as the new manager.

Manager	Signed from	Date of signing	Date of departure	Signed with	Source
(Brazil) Fábio Carille	Assistant coach	22 December 2016	22 May 2018	(Saudi Arabia) Al-Wehda	
(Brazil) Osmar Loss	Assistant coach	22 May 2018	5 September 2018	Technical staff (assistant coach)	
(Brazil) Jair Ventura	Free agent	6 September 2018	–	–	

=== Transfers ===
==== Transfers in ====
#	Position:	Player	Transferred from	Fee	Date	Team	Source
19	FW	(Brazil) Júnior Dutra	(Brazil) Avaí	Free Transfer (End of contract)	7 December 2017	First team	
39	MF	(Brazil) Renê Júnior	(Brazil) Ponte Preta	Free Transfer (End of contract)	4 January 2018	First team	
6	DF	(Brazil) Juninho Capixaba	(Brazil) Bahia	R$6,000,000 (also traded for Douglas)	5 January 2018	First team	
22	MF	(Brazil) Mateus Vital	(Brazil) Vasco da Gama	R$8,000,000	16 January 2018	First team	
47	FW	(Qatar) Emerson Sheik	Free agent	Free Transfer	19 January 2018	First team	
3	DF	(Brazil) Henrique	(Brazil) Fluminense	Free Transfer (Rescinded contract)	26 January 2018	First team	
15	MF	(Brazil) Ralf	Free agent	Free Transfer	17 February 2018	First team	
13	DF	(Brazil) Marllon	(Brazil) Cianorte	R$1,000,000	19 February 2018	First team	
29	FW	(Brazil) Matheus Matias	(Brazil) ABC	Undisclosed	21 February 2018	First team	
9	FW	(Brazil) Roger	(Brazil) Internacional	Free Transfer (Rescinded contract)	20 April 2018	First team	
19	MF	(Brazil) Fessin	(Brazil) ABC	R$2,000,000	11 May 2018	Academy	
30	MF	(Brazil) Douglas	(Brazil) Fluminense	R$7,000,000	19 July 2018	First team	

==== Loans in ====
#	Position	Player	Loaned from	Date	Loan expires	Team	Source
16	DF	(Brazil) Sidcley	(Brazil) Atlético Paranaense	23 February 2018	31 December 2018 (Canceled on 6 July 2018)	First team	
17	MF	(Brazil) Thiaguinho	(Brazil) Nacional-SP	24 April 2018	31 May 2019	First team	
39	FW	(Brazil) Bruno Xavier	(Brazil) Nacional-SP	24 April 2018	31 May 2019 (Canceled on 7 August 2018)	First team	
35	DF	(Brazil) Danilo Avelar	(Italy) Torino	26 June 2018	30 June 2019	First team	
7	FW	(Brazil) Jonathas	(Germany) Hannover 96	5 July 2018	30 June 2019	First team	
21	FW	(Paraguay) Sergio Díaz	(Spain) Real Madrid	30 July 2018	31 December 2019	First team	
16	MF	(Chile) Ángelo Araos	Universidad de Chile	30 July 2018	30 June 2019 (Note: Loan with an obligation to buy: U$4,000,000 (~R$17,100,000).)	First team	

==== Transfers out ====
#	Position	Player	Transferred to	Fee	Date	Team	Source
13	DF	(Brazil) Guilherme Arana	(Spain) Sevilla	Undisclosed (€12,000,000 ~R$46,500,000)	1 December 2017	First team	
	FW	(Brazil) Luciano	(Greece) Panathinaikos	Free Transfer (End of contract)	1 January 2018	First team	
	MF	(Brazil) Cristian	Free agent	Free Transfer (End of contract)	1 January 2018	First team	
7	FW	(Brazil) Jô	(Japan) Nagoya Grampus	U$10,000,000 (~R$32,000,000)	3 January 2018	First team	
	GK	(Brazil) Douglas	(Brazil) Bahia	Free Transfer (Part of a trade involving Juninho Capixaba)	5 January 2018	First team	
	MF	(Brazil) Alan Mineiro	(Brazil) Fortaleza	Free Transfer (Rescinded contract)	5 January 2018	First team	
	FW	(Colombia) Stiven Mendoza	(France) Amiens	€1,000,000 (~R$3,500,000)	8 January 2018	First team	
8	MF	(Brazil) Maycon	(Ukraine) Shakhtar Donetsk	€6,600,000 (~R$27,600,000)	17 June 2018	First team	
	MF	(Paraguay) Gustavo Viera	(Paraguay) Independiente F.B.C.	Free Transfer (Rescinded contract)	25 June 2018	First team	
4	DF	(Paraguay) Fabián Balbuena	(England) West Ham United	€4,000,000 (~R$18,000,000)	14 July 2018	First team	
26	MF	(Brazil) Rodriguinho	(Egypt) Pyramids FC	U$6,000,000 (~R$22,600,000)	21 July 2018	First team	

==== Loans out ====
#	Position	Player	Loaned to	Date	Loan expires	Team	Source
	DF	(Brazil) Rodrigo Sam	(Brazil) Ituano	8 December 2017	30 April 2018	First team	
	FW	(Brazil) Gustavo	(Brazil) Fortaleza	13 December 2017	31 December 2018	First team	
	DF	(Brazil) Vinicius Del'Amore	(Brazil) Londrina	28 December 2017	31 December 2018 (Canceled on 7 August 2018)	First team	
	MF	(Brazil) Marlone	(Brazil) Sport Recife	28 December 2017	31 December 2018	First team	
22	MF	(Brazil) Marciel	(Brazil) Ponte Preta	29 December 2017	31 December 2018 (Canceled on 14 July 2018)	First team	
	FW	(Brazil) Luidy	(Brazil) Ceará	29 December 2017	31 December 2018 (Canceled on 18 August 2018)	First team	
	FW	(Brazil) Gabriel Vasconcelos	(Brazil) Ponte Preta	12 January 2018	31 December 2018 (Canceled on 26 July 2018)	First team	
32	MF	(Brazil) Rodrigo Figueiredo	(Brazil) Londrina	19 January 2018	31 December 2018 (Canceled on 17 April 2018)	First team	
21	MF	(Brazil) Fellipe Bastos	(Brazil) Sport Recife	4 February 2018	31 December 2018	First team	
17	MF	(Brazil) Giovanni Augusto	(Brazil) Vasco da Gama	12 February 2018	31 December 2018	First team	
36	DF	(Brazil) Moisés	(Brazil) Botafogo	20 February 2018	31 December 2018	First team	
13	DF	(Brazil) Guilherme Romão	(Brazil) Oeste	22 February 2018	31 December 2018	First team	
35	FW	(Brazil) Carlinhos	(Brazil) Oeste	22 February 2018	31 December 2018	First team	
33	DF	(Brazil) Yago	(Brazil) Botafogo	23 February 2018	31 December 2018	First team	
29	MF	(Brazil) Camacho	(Brazil) Atlético Paranaense	23 February 2018	31 December 2018	First team	
	MF	(Brazil) Marquinhos	(Brazil) Bangu	2 March 2018	30 April 2018	Academy	
	MF	(Brazil) Warian	(Brazil) Atlético Goianiense	20 March 2018	31 December 2018	First team	
	MF	(Brazil) Jean	(Brazil) Botafogo	13 April 2018	31 December 2018	First team	
30	FW	(Brazil) Lucca	(Brazil) Internacional	19 April 2018	31 July 2019 (Canceled on 13 September 2018)	First team	
	FW	(Brazil) Bruno Paulo	(Brazil) CRB	26 April 2018	31 December 2018	First team	
	MF	(Brazil) Marquinhos	(Brazil) Bragantino	1 May 2018	31 December 2018	Academy	
	DF	(Brazil) Rodrigo Sam	(Brazil) Boa Esporte	May 2018	31 December 2018 (Canceled in July 2018)	First team	
	DF	(Brazil) Marcelo Deverlan	(Italy) Fiorentina	21 May 2018	30 June 2019	Academy	
35	DF	(Brazil) Léo Príncipe	(France) Le Havre	25 June 2018	31 July 2019	First team	
	MF	(Brazil) Renan Areias	(Brazil) Red Bull Brasil	25 June 2018	30 June 2019	Academy	
18	FW	(Turkey) Colin Kazim-Richards	(Mexico) Lobos BUAP	13 July 2018	31 December 2018	First Team	
	MF	(Brazil) Marciel	(Brazil) Oeste	15 July 2018	31 December 2018	First team	
19	FW	(Brazil) Júnior Dutra	(Brazil) Fluminense	18 July 2018	31 December 2018	First Team	
6	DF	(Brazil) Juninho Capixaba	(Brazil) Grêmio	24 July 2018	31 May 2019	First Team	
	FW	(Brazil) Gabriel Vasconcelos	(Brazil) São Bento	26 July 2018	31 December 2018	First team	
	DF	(Brazil) Rodrigo Sam	(Brazil) Novorizontino	9 August 2018	31 December 2018	First team	
	FW	(Brazil) Luidy	(Brazil) São Bento	20 August 2018	30 April 2019	First team	
31	MF	(Brazil) Marquinhos Gabriel	(United Arab Emirates) Al-Nasr	22 August 2018	31 July 2019	First team	
	FW	(Brazil) Lucca	(Qatar) Al-Rayyan	13 September 2018	31 July 2019	First team	

== Squad statistics ==
No.	Pos.	Name	Campeonato Paulista		Copa Libertadores		Campeonato Brasileiro		Copa do Brasil		Total		Discipline	
No.	Pos.	Name	Apps	Goals	Apps	Goals	Apps	Goals	Apps	Goals	Apps	Goals	Yellow card	Red card
1	GK	(Brazil) Caíque França	0	0	0	0	0	0	0	0	0	0	1	0
2	MF	(Brazil) Guilherme Mantuan	3 (2)	0	3	0	13 (1)	0	1	0	20 (3)	0	2	0
3	DF	(Brazil) Henrique	12	1	8	0	35	2	8	0	63	3	10	0
4	DF	(Paraguay) Fabián Balbuena	15	3	6	0	8	0	2	0	31	3	4	0
5	MF	(Brazil) Gabriel	14 (1)	1	6	0	23 (2)	1	6 (2)	0	49 (5)	2	15	1
6	DF	(Brazil) Juninho Capixaba	7	0	0	0	1 (1)	0	0	0	8 (1)	0	2	0
7	FW	(Brazil) Jonathas	0	0	0	0	3 (4)	1	1 (1)	0	4 (5)	1	0	0
8	MF	(Brazil) Maycon	11 (3)	1	6	0	8 (2)	0	2	1	27 (5)	2	5	0
8	MF	(Brazil) Renê Júnior	3	1	1	0	4	0	0	0	8	1	2	0
9	FW	(Brazil) Roger	0	0	1	1	13 (8)	4	0	0	14 (8)	5	3	0
10	MF	(Brazil) Jádson	10 (1)	3	7	6	23 (2)	4	8	2	48 (3)	15	5	0
11	FW	(Paraguay) Ángel Romero	12 (3)	1	8	1	27	6	8	3	55 (3)	11	13	1
12	GK	(Brazil) Cássio	18	0	7	0	27	0	8	0	60	0	7	0
13	DF	(Brazil) Guilherme Romão	1 (1)	0	0	0	0	0	0	0	1 (1)	0	2	1
13	DF	(Brazil) Marllon	0	0	0	0	3	0	0	0	3	0	0	0
14	DF	(Brazil) Léo Santos	0	0	0 (2)	0	20 (2)	0	4	0	24 (4)	0	3	0
15	MF	(Brazil) Ralf	4	0	2	0	18 (1)	1	5 (1)	0	29 (2)	1	8	0
16	DF	(Brazil) Sidcley	7	1	5	1	11	1	2	0	25	3	1	0
16	MF	(Chile) Ángelo Araos	0	0	0	0	6 (9)	0	0 (4)	0	6 (13)	0	5	2
17	MF	(Brazil) Thiaguinho	0	0	0	0	5 (4)	0	0	0	5 (4)	0	1	0
18	FW	(Turkey) Colin Kazim-Richards	3 (1)	0	0	0	0 (1)	0	0	0	3 (2)	0	0	0
19	FW	(Brazil) Júnior Dutra	7 (5)	1	0 (5)	2	1 (4)	0	0	0	8 (14)	3	4	0
20	MF	(Brazil) Danilo	0 (5)	0	0	0	6 (7)	2	0	0	6 (12)	2	0	0
21	FW	(Paraguay) Sergio Díaz	0	0	0	0	1 (1)	0	0	0	1 (1)	0	0	0
22	MF	(Brazil) Mateus Vital	7 (3)	0	2 (5)	0	18 (15)	2	3 (5)	0	30 (28)	2	0	0
23	DF	(Brazil) Fagner	15	0	5	0	20	0	7	0	47	0	12	0
25	FW	(Brazil) Clayson	13 (2)	2	4	0	12 (11)	1	5 (1)	0	34 (14)	3	8	1
26	MF	(Brazil) Rodriguinho	15	4	5	0	11	5	2	0	33	9	4	0
27	GK	(Brazil) Walter	0	0	1	0	11 (1)	0	0	0	12 (1)	0	0	0
28	MF	(Brazil) Paulo Roberto	0	0	0 (1)	0	4 (2)	0	0 (2)	0	4 (5)	0	1	0
29	MF	(Brazil) Camacho	1 (3)	0	0	0	0	0	0	0	1 (3)	0	2	0
29	FW	(Brazil) Matheus Matias	0	0	0	0	0 (2)	0	0	0	0 (2)	0	0	0
30	FW	(Brazil) Lucca	3 (5)	0	0 (1)	0	0	0	0	0	3 (6)	0	1	0
30	MF	(Brazil) Douglas	0	0	2	0	14 (1)	1	4	0	20 (1)	1	9	1
31	MF	(Brazil) Marquinhos Gabriel	2 (3)	0	0 (3)	0	4 (8)	1	0 (1)	0	6 (15)	1	3	0
31	MF	(Brazil) Rafael Bilú	0	0	0	0	0 (1)	0	0	0	0 (1)	0	0	0
32	MF	(Brazil) Rodrigo Figueiredo	0	0	0	0	0 (1)	0	0	0	0 (1)	0	0	0
33	DF	(Brazil) Carlos Augusto	0	0	0 (1)	0	7	0	0	0	7 (1)	0	1	0
34	DF	(Brazil) Pedro Henrique	9	1	2	0	12	0	2	0	25	1	6	0
35	DF	(Brazil) Danilo Avelar	0	0	2	0	19	1	6	1	27	2	2	1
37	DF	(Brazil) Vilson	0	0	0	0	0	0	0	0	0	0	0	0
38	MF	(Brazil) Pedrinho	0 (7)	1	4 (2)	0	27 (8)	1	2 (3)	1	33 (20)	3	4	0
40	GK	(Brazil) Filipe	0	0	0	0	0	0	0	0	0	0	0	0
47	FW	(Qatar) Emerson Sheik	5 (6)	1	1 (4)	1	3 (14)	0	2 (4)	0	11 (28)	2	6	1

== Overview ==
Competition	First match	Last match	Starting round	Final position	Record							
Competition	First match	Last match	Starting round	Final position	Pld	W	D	L	GF	GA	GD	Win %
Série A	15 April 2018	2 December 2018	Matchday 1	13th	38	11	11	16	34	35	−1	28.95
Copa do Brasil	7 February 2018	17 October 2018	Round of 16	Runners-up	8	4	2	2	8	5	+3	50.00
Campeonato Paulista	17 January 2018	8 April 2018	Matchday 1	Winners	18	10	2	6	23	13	+10	55.56
Copa Libertadores	28 February 2018	29 August 2018	Group stage	Round of 16	8	4	1	3	13	7	+6	50.00
Total					72	29	16	27	78	60	+18	40.28

Source: Competitions

== Pre-season and friendlies ==
=== Florida Cup ===
10 January 2018 Florida Cup	Corinthians (Brazil)	1–1 (5–4 p)	(Netherlands) PSV Eindhoven	Orlando, United States
16:00 UTC−5	Rodriguinho 23'	Report	Lammers 90+3'	Stadium: Orlando City Stadium; Referee: Jonathan Bilinski
	Penalties
	Júnior Dutra (penalty scored); Fellipe Bastos (penalty scored); Maycon (penalty scored); Camacho (penalty scored); Giovanni Augusto (penalty scored)		(penalty scored) Maher; (penalty scored) Schwaab; (penalty missed) Lammers; (penalty scored) Arias; (penalty scored) Malen

13 January 2018 Florida Cup	Rangers (Scotland)	4–2	(Brazil) Corinthians	Orlando, United States
16:00 UTC−5	Morelos 62', 76'; Halliday 70'; Tavernier 81'	Report	Rodriguinho 30'; Kazim-Richards 39'	Stadium: Spectrum Stadium; Referee: Jonathan Bilinski

=== Friendlies ===
4 July 2018 Friendly	Cruzeiro (Brazil)	0–2	(Brazil) Corinthians	Belo Horizonte, Brazil
20:00 UTC−3		Report	Romero 13'; Pedro Henrique 74'	Stadium: Mineirão; Attendance: 11,364; Referee: Emerson Almeida Ferreira

8 July 2018 Friendly	Corinthians (Brazil)	2–1	(Brazil) Grêmio	São Paulo, Brazil
11:00 UTC−3	Matheus Matias 67'; Marquinhos Gabriel 71'	Report	Léo Moura 4'	Stadium: Arena Corinthians; Attendance: 27,549; Referee: Bruno Salgado Rizo

11 July 2018 Friendly	Corinthians (Brazil)	2–2	(Brazil) Cruzeiro	São Paulo, Brazil
20:00 UTC−3	Paulo Roberto 37'; Pedrinho 83'	Report	Henrique 15'; Rafael Sóbis 23'	Stadium: Arena Corinthians; Attendance: 37,091; Referee: Lucas Canetto Bellote

Last updated: 12 July 2018

== Campeonato Paulista ==
For the 2018 Campeonato Paulista, the 16 teams are divided in four groups of 4 teams (A, B, C, D). They will face all teams, except those that are in their own group, with the top two teams from each group qualifying for the quarterfinals. The two overall worst teams will be relegated.

=== Statistics ===
Group A
Pos	Team	Pld	W	D	L	GF	GA	GD	Pts	Qualification
1	Corinthians	12	7	2	3	17	8	+9	23	knockout stage
2	Bragantino	12	4	5	3	9	8	+1	17	knockout stage
3	Ituano	12	4	5	3	13	13	0	17	
4	Linense	12	2	4	6	13	20	−7	10	

Source: Soccerway

=== First stage ===
17 January 2018 1	Corinthians	0–1	Ponte Preta	São Paulo
21:50 UTC−3		Report	Felipe Saraiva 68'	Stadium: Estádio do Pacaembu (Note: Corinthians played these home matches at Estádio do Pacaembu due to Arena Corinthians' pitch being changed.); Attendance: 21,112; Referee: Raphael Claus

21 January 2018 2	São Caetano	0–4	Corinthians	São Paulo
19:30 UTC−3		Report	Jádson 16', 74'; Júnior Dutra 62'; Romero 86'	Stadium: Estádio do Pacaembu (Note: São Caetano played this match at Estádio do Pacaembu, São Paulo, instead of their regular stadium Estádio Anacleto Campanella, São Caetano do Sul.); Attendance: 8,030; Referee: Flávio Rodrigues de Souza

24 January 2018 3	Corinthians	2–1	Ferroviária	São Paulo
19:30 UTC−3	Balbuena 47'; Clayson 82'	Report	Léo Castro 18'	Stadium: Estádio do Pacaembu; Attendance: 21,334; Referee: Adriano de Assis Miranda

27 January 2018 4	Corinthians	2–1	São Paulo	São Paulo
17:00 UTC−3	Jádson 1'; Balbuena 32'	Report	Brenner 25'	Stadium: Estádio do Pacaembu; Attendance: 34,358; Referee: Marcelo Aparecido de Souza

4 February 2018 5	Novorizontino	0–1	Corinthians	Novo Horizonte
19:30 UTC−3		Report	Pedro Henrique 40'	Stadium: Estádio Dr. Jorge Ismael de Biasi; Attendance: 8,914; Referee: Vinicius Gonçalves Dias Araújo

9 February 2018 6	Santo André	2–1	Corinthians	Santo André
19:00 UTC−3	Tinga 52'; Lincom 80'	Report	Rodriguinho 38'	Stadium: Estádio Bruno José Daniel; Attendance: 9,702; Referee: Salim Fende Chavez

14 February 2018 7	Corinthians	0–1	São Bento	São Paulo
21:45 UTC−3		Report	João Paulo 23'	Stadium: Arena Corinthians; Attendance: 14,762; Referee: Flávio Rodrigues de Souza

19 February 2018 8	Red Bull Brasil	1–1	Corinthians	Campinas
20:00 UTC−3	Juninho Capixaba 68' (o.g.)	Report	Tiago Alves 52' (o.g.)	Stadium: Estádio Moisés Lucarelli; Attendance: 7,439; Referee: Vinicius Furlan

24 February 2018 9	Corinthians	2–0	Palmeiras	São Paulo
17:00 UTC−3	Rodriguinho 39'; Clayson 77' (pen.)	Report		Stadium: Arena Corinthians; Attendance: 42,448; Referee: Raphael Claus

4 March 2018 10	Santos	1–1	Corinthians	São Paulo
17:00 UTC−3	Diogo Vitor 86'	Report	Renê Júnior 19'	Stadium: Estádio do Pacaembu (Note: Santos played these matches at Estádio do Pacaembu, São Paulo, instead of their regular stadium Vila Belmiro, Santos.); Attendance: 37,431; Referee: Luiz Flávio de Oliveira

7 March 2018 11	Corinthians	1–0	Mirassol	São Paulo
21:45 UTC−3	Emerson Sheik 87'	Report		Stadium: Arena Corinthians; Attendance: 15,388; Referee: Vinícius Gonçalves Dias Araújo

11 March 2018 12	Botafogo	0–2	Corinthians	Ribeirão Preto
17:00 UTC−3		Report	Henrique 49'; Gabriel 84'	Stadium: Estádio Santa Cruz; Attendance: 12,298; Referee: Flávio Rodrigues de Souza

=== Knockout stages ===
18 March 2018 Quarter-finals	Bragantino	3–2	Corinthians	São Paulo
16:00 UTC−3	Matheus Peixoto 45+2'; Vitinho 70'; Italo 76'	Report	Balbuena 65'; Pedrinho 87'	Stadium: Estádio do Pacaembu (Note: Bragantino played this match at Estádio do Pacaembu, São Paulo, instead of their regular stadium Estádio Nabi Abi Chedid, Bragança Paulista.); Attendance: 15,525; Referee: Leandro Bizzio Marinho

22 March 2018 Quarter-finals	Corinthians	2–0 (4–3 agg.)	Bragantino	São Paulo
20:00 UTC−3	Sidcley 29'; Maycon 44'	Report		Stadium: Arena Corinthians; Attendance: 32,939; Referee: Vinicius Gonçalves Dias Araújo

25 March 2018 Semi-finals	São Paulo	1–0	Corinthians	São Paulo
16:00 UTC−3	Nenê 45+2'	Report		Stadium: Estádio do Morumbi; Attendance: 42,830; Referee: Raphael Claus

28 March 2018 Semi-finals	Corinthians	1–0 (1–1 agg.) (5–4 p)	São Paulo	São Paulo
21:45 UTC−3	Rodriguinho 90+2'	Report		Stadium: Arena Corinthians; Attendance: 43,367; Referee: Vinícius Gonçalves Dias Araújo
	Penalties
	Mateus Vital (penalty scored); Rodriguinho (penalty missed); Clayson (penalty scored); Pedrinho (penalty scored); Maycon (penalty scored); Danilo (penalty scored)		(penalty missed) Diego Souza; (penalty scored) Lucas Fernandes; (penalty scored) Bruno Alves; (penalty scored) Reinaldo; (penalty scored) Éder Militão; (penalty missed) Liziero

31 March 2018 Finals	Corinthians	0–1	Palmeiras	São Paulo
16:30 UTC−3		Report	Borja 6'	Stadium: Arena Corinthians; Attendance: 43,905; Referee: Leandro Bizzio Marinho

8 April 2018 Finals	Palmeiras	0–1 (1–1 agg.) (3–4 p)	Corinthians	São Paulo
16:00 UTC−3		Report	Rodriguinho 1'	Stadium: Allianz Parque; Attendance: 41,227; Referee: Marcelo Aparecido Ribeiro de Souza
	Penalties
	Dudu (penalty missed); Victor Luis (penalty scored); Lucas Lima (penalty missed); Marcos Rocha (penalty scored); Moisés (penalty scored)		(penalty scored) Danilo; (penalty scored) Romero; (penalty scored) Lucca; (penalty missed) Fagner; (penalty scored) Maycon

== Libertadores ==
=== Group stage ===
Pos	Team	Pld	W	D	L	GF	GA	GD	Pts	Qualification	COR	IND	MIL	LAR
1	(Brazil) Corinthians	6	3	1	2	11	5	+6	10	Round of 16	—	1–2	0–1	2–0
2	(Argentina) Independiente	6	3	1	2	6	4	+2	10	Round of 16	0–1	—	1–0	2–0
3	(Colombia) Millonarios	6	2	2	2	7	4	+3	8	Copa Sudamericana	0–0	1–1	—	4–0
4	(Venezuela) Deportivo Lara	6	2	0	4	5	16	−11	6		2–7	1–0	2–1	—

Source: CONMEBOL
Rules for classification: Group stage tiebreakers

28 February 2018 1	Millonarios (Colombia)	0–0	(Brazil) Corinthians	Bogotá, Colombia
19:45 UTC−5		Report		Stadium: Estadio El Campín; Attendance: 25,061; Referee: Roddy Zambrano (Ecuador)

14 March 2018 2	Corinthians (Brazil)	2–0	(Venezuela) Deportivo Lara	São Paulo, Brazil
21:45 UTC−3	Emerson Sheik 64'; Pernía 76' (o.g.)	Report		Stadium: Arena Corinthians; Attendance: 31,767; Referee: Raúl Orosco (Bolivia)

18 April 2018 3	Independiente (Argentina)	0–1	(Brazil) Corinthians	Avellaneda, Argentina
21:45 UTC−3		Report	Jádson 80'	Stadium: Estadio Libertadores de América; Attendance: 40,325; Referee: Daniel Fedorczuk (Uruguay)

2 May 2018 4	Corinthians (Brazil)	1–2	(Argentina) Independiente	São Paulo, Brazil
21:45 UTC−3	Jádson 31'	Report	Benítez 1'; Romero 24' (o.g.)	Stadium: Arena Corinthians; Attendance: 36,508; Referee: Víctor Carrillo (Peru)

17 May 2018 5	Deportivo Lara (Venezuela)	2–7	(Brazil) Corinthians	Cabudare, Venezuela
20:30 UTC−4	Reyes 45'; Hernández 76'	Report	Jádson 10', 31' (pen.), 51'; Sidcley 69'; Romero 85'; Júnior Dutra 90+9', 90+11'	Stadium: Estadio Metropolitano de Cabudare; Attendance: 25,820; Referee: Andrés Cunha (Uruguay)

24 May 2018 6	Corinthians (Brazil)	0–1	(Colombia) Millonarios	São Paulo, Brazil
21:30 UTC−3		Report	Carrillo 72'	Stadium: Arena Corinthians; Attendance: 30,551; Referee: Diego Haro (Peru)

=== Knockout stages ===
8 August 2018 Round of 16	Colo-Colo (Chile)	1–0	(Brazil) Corinthians	Santiago, Chile
20:45 UTC−4	Carmona 37'	Report		Stadium: Estadio Monumental David Arellano; Referee: Wilmar Roldán (Colombia)

29 August 2018 Round of 16	Corinthians (Brazil)	2–1 (2–2a agg.)	(Chile) Colo-Colo	São Paulo, Brazil
21:45 UTC−3	Jádson 16' (pen.); Roger 63'	Report	Barrios 31'	Stadium: Arena Corinthians; Attendance: 38,429; Referee: Néstor Pitana (Argentina)

== Campeonato Brasileiro ==
Pos	Team	Pld	W	D	L	GF	GA	GD	Pts	Qualification or relegation
11	Bahia	38	12	12	14	39	41	−2	48	Qualification for Copa Sudamericana first stage
12	Fluminense	38	12	9	17	32	46	−14	45	Qualification for Copa Sudamericana first stage
13	Corinthians	38	11	11	16	34	35	−1	44	Qualification for Copa Sudamericana first stage
14	Chapecoense	38	11	11	16	34	50	−16	44	Qualification for Copa Sudamericana first stage
15	Ceará	38	10	14	14	32	38	−6	44	

Source: CBF
Rules for classification: 1) points; 2) wins; 3) goal difference; 4) goals scored; 5) head-to-head results; 6) least red cards received; 7) least yellow cards received; 8) draw.

=== Results ===
15 April 2018 1	Corinthians	2–1	Fluminense	São Paulo
16:00 UTC−3	Rodriguinho 45', 85'	Report	Richard 48'	Stadium: Arena Corinthians; Attendance: 29,063; Referee: Anderson Daronco

22 April 2018 2	Paraná	0–4	Corinthians	Curitiba
11:00 UTC−3		Report	Rodriguinho 25'; Sidcley 26'; Clayson 79'; Gabriel 85'	Stadium: Vila Capanema; Attendance: 16,772; Referee: Péricles Bassols

29 April 2018 3	Atlético Mineiro	1–0	Corinthians	Belo Horizonte
16:00 UTC−3	Róger Guedes 86'	Report		Stadium: Estádio Independência; Attendance: 19,825; Referee: Dewson Fernando Freitas da Silva

6 May 2018 4	Corinthians	1–1	Ceará	São Paulo
11:00 UTC−3	Henrique 39'	Report	Wescley 8'	Stadium: Arena Corinthians; Attendance: 40,570; Referee: Savio Pereira Sampaio

13 May 2018 5	Corinthians	1–0	Palmeiras	São Paulo
16:00 UTC−3	Rodriguinho 37'	Report		Stadium: Arena Corinthians; Attendance: 35,246; Referee: Anderson Daronco

20 May 2018 6	Sport Recife	1–1	Corinthians	São Lourenço da Mata
16:00 UTC−3	Carlos Henrique 63'	Report	Roger 54'	Stadium: Itaipava Arena Pernambuco; Attendance: 28,942; Referee: Wilton Pereira Sampaio

27 May 2018 7	Internacional	2–1	Corinthians	Porto Alegre
16:00 UTC−3	Leandro Damião 63'; Rossi 90+1'	Report	Mateus Vital 4'	Stadium: Estádio Beira-Rio; Attendance: 30,791; Referee: Péricles Bassols

31 May 2018 8	Corinthians	1–0	América Mineiro	São Paulo
18:00 UTC−3	Jádson 49'	Report		Stadium: Arena Corinthians; Attendance: 35,141; Referee: Grazianni Maciel Rocha

3 June 2018 9	Flamengo	1–0	Corinthians	Rio de Janeiro
16:00 UTC−3	Felipe Vizeu 79'	Report		Stadium: Maracanã; Attendance: 49,222; Referee: Anderson Daronco

6 June 2018 10	Corinthians	1–1	Santos	São Paulo
21:00 UTC−3	Roger 51'	Report	Victor Ferraz 74'	Stadium: Arena Corinthians; Attendance: 27,848; Referee: Ricardo Marques Ribeiro

9 June 2018 11	Corinthians	0–0	Vitória	São Paulo
21:00 UTC−3		Report		Stadium: Arena Corinthians; Attendance: 27,990; Referee: Péricles Bassols

13 June 2018 12	Bahia	1–0	Corinthians	Salvador
21:45 UTC−3	Mena 90'	Report		Stadium: Itaipava Arena Fonte Nova; Attendance: 15,041; Referee: Leandro Vuaden

18 July 2018 13	Corinthians	2–0	Botafogo	São Paulo
21:45 UTC−3	Rodriguinho 3'; Romero 75'	Report		Stadium: Arena Corinthians; Attendance: 20,073; Referee: Rodrigo D'Alonso Ferreira

21 July 2018 14	São Paulo	3–1	Corinthians	São Paulo
21:00 UTC−3	Anderson Martins 55'; Reinaldo 69', 81'	Report	Jonathas 90'	Stadium: Estádio do Morumbi; Attendance: 58,624; Referee: Marcelo de Lima Henrique

25 July 2018 15	Corinthians	2–0	Cruzeiro	São Paulo
21:45 UTC−3	Romero 61', 79'	Report		Stadium: Arena Corinthians; Attendance: 21,307; Referee: Paulo Roberto Alves Junior

29 July 2018 16	Vasco da Gama	1–4	Corinthians	Brasília
11:00 UTC−3	Yago Pikachu 45' (pen.)	Report	Romero 48', 56', 90+2'; Jádson 78' (pen.)	Stadium: Estádio Nacional Mané Garrincha (Note: Vasco da Gama played this match at Estádio Nacional Mané Garrincha, Brasília, instead of their regular stadium Estádio São Januário, Rio de Janeiro.); Attendance: 33,516; Referee: Dewson Fernando Freitas da Silva

4 August 2018 17	Corinthians	0–0	Atlético Paranaense	São Paulo
21:00 UTC−3		Report		Stadium: Arena Corinthians; Attendance: 28,662; Referee: Péricles Bassols

12 August 2018 18	Chapecoense	2–1	Corinthians	Chapecó
16:00 UTC−3	Torres 69'; Doffo 90+4'	Report	Marquinhos Gabriel 5'	Stadium: Arena Condá; Attendance: 10,070; Referee: Grazianni Maciel Rocha

18 August 2018 19	Corinthians	0–1	Grêmio	São Paulo
19:00 UTC−3		Report	Éverton 54'	Stadium: Arena Corinthians; Attendance: 32,848; Referee: Wagner Reway

22 August 2018 20	Fluminense	1–0	Corinthians	Rio de Janeiro
21:45 UTC−3	Gum 17'	Report		Stadium: Maracanã; Attendance: 8,444; Referee: Ricardo Marques Ribeiro

25 August 2018 21	Corinthians	1–0	Paraná	São Paulo
19:00 UTC−3	Henrique 35'	Report		Stadium: Arena Corinthians; Attendance: 28,375; Referee: André Luis de Freitas Castro

1 September 2018 22	Corinthians	1–1	Atlético Mineiro	São Paulo
21:00 UTC−3	Pedrinho 19'	Report	Fábio Santos 35' (pen.)	Stadium: Arena Corinthians; Attendance: 29,609; Referee: Wagner Nascimento Magalhães

5 September 2018 23	Ceará	2–1	Corinthians	Fortaleza
20:00 UTC−3	Éverson 18'; Avelar 56' (o.g.)	Report	Roger 71'	Stadium: Arena Castelão; Attendance: 39,785; Referee: Rodolpho Toski

9 September 2018 24	Palmeiras	1–0	Corinthians	São Paulo
16:00 UTC−3	Deyverson 56'	Report		Stadium: Allianz Parque; Attendance: 38,568; Referee: Jean Pierre Gonçalves Lima

16 September 2018 25	Corinthians	2–1	Sport Recife	São Paulo
19:00 UTC−3	Jádson 58'; Avelar 88'	Report	Hernane 21' (pen.)	Stadium: Arena Corinthians; Attendance: 21,112; Referee: Rodrigo D'Alonso Ferreira

23 September 2018 26	Corinthians	1–1	Internacional	São Paulo
16:00 UTC−3	Douglas 49'	Report	Leandro Damião 44'	Stadium: Arena Corinthians; Attendance: 27,199; Referee: Eduardo Tomaz Aquino Valadão

29 September 2018 27	América Mineiro	0–0	Corinthians	Belo Horizonte
19:00 UTC−3		Report		Stadium: Estádio Independência; Attendance: 21,112; Referee: Marcelo de Lima Henrique

5 October 2018 28	Corinthians	0–3	Flamengo	São Paulo
21:00 UTC−3		Report	Lucas Paquetá 59', 65'; Renê 90+1'	Stadium: Arena Corinthians; Attendance: 41,943; Referee: Paulo Roberto Alves Júnior

13 October 2018 29	Santos	1–0	Corinthians	São Paulo
19:00 UTC−3	Gabriel 20'	Report		Stadium: Estádio do Pacaembu; Attendance: 26,428; Referee: Péricles Bassols

21 October 2018 30	Vitória	2–2	Corinthians	Salvador
16:00 UTC−3	Rhayner 8'; Neílton 90+2'	Report	Jádson 30'; Roger 90'	Stadium: Barradão; Attendance: 18,663; Referee: Rafael Traci

27 October 2018 31	Corinthians	2–1	Bahia	São Paulo
19:00 UTC−3	Danilo 46', 88'	Report	Clayton 84' (pen.)	Stadium: Arena Corinthians; Attendance: 35,577; Referee: Péricles Bassols

4 November 2018 32	Botafogo	1–0	Corinthians	Rio de Janeiro
17:00 UTC−3	Rodrigo Lindoso 27'	Report		Stadium: Estádio Olímpico Nilton Santos; Attendance: 21,463; Referee: Leandro Vuaden

10 November 2018 33	Corinthians	1–1	São Paulo	São Paulo
17:00 UTC−3	Ralf 71'	Report	Brenner 80'	Stadium: Arena Corinthians; Attendance: 43,122; Referee: Rodolpho Toski

14 November 2018 34	Cruzeiro	1–0	Corinthians	Belo Horizonte
21:45 UTC−3	David 13'	Report		Stadium: Mineirão; Attendance: 15,520; Referee: Jean Pierre Gonçalves Lima

17 November 2018 35	Corinthians	1–0	Vasco da Gama	São Paulo
19:00 UTC−3	Mateus Vital 49'	Report		Stadium: Arena Corinthians; Attendance: 38,835; Referee: Wilton Pereira Sampaio

21 November 2018 36	Atlético Paranaense	1–0	Corinthians	Curitiba
21:45 UTC−3	Léo Pereira 51'	Report		Stadium: Arena da Baixada; Attendance: 16,332; Referee: Marcelo de Lima Henrique

25 November 2018 37	Corinthians	0–0	Chapecoense	São Paulo
19:00 UTC−3		Report		Stadium: Arena Corinthians; Attendance: 36,110; Referee: Paulo Roberto Alves Junior

2 December 2018 38	Grêmio	1–0	Corinthians	Porto Alegre
17:00 UTC−3	Jael 11'	Report		Stadium: Arena do Grêmio; Attendance: 41,330; Referee: Ricardo Marques Ribeiro

== Copa do Brasil ==
Due to being qualified to the 2018 Copa Libertadores, Corinthians entered the competition on the round of 16.

=== Knockout stages ===
25 April 2018 Round of 16	Vitória	0–0	Corinthians	Salvador
19:30 UTC−3		Report		Stadium: Barradão; Attendance: 11,738; Referee: Bráulio da Silva Machado

9 May 2018 Round of 16	Corinthians	3–1 (3–1 agg.)	Vitória	São Paulo
19:30 UTC−3	Maycon 38'; Romero 58', 65'	Report	André Lima 76'	Stadium: Arena Corinthians; Attendance: 29,840; Referee: Sandro Meira Ricci

1 August 2018 Quarter-finals	Corinthians	1–0	Chapecoense	São Paulo
21:45 UTC−3	Romero 5'	Report		Stadium: Arena Corinthians; Attendance: 23,879; Referee: Wagner Nascimento Magalhães

15 August 2018 Quarter-finals	Chapecoense	0–1 (0–2 agg.)	Corinthians	Chapecó
21:45 UTC−3		Report	Jádson 83'	Stadium: Arena Condá; Attendance: 11,438; Referee: Leandro Vuaden

12 September 2018 Semi-finals	Flamengo	0–0	Corinthians	Rio de Janeiro
21:45 UTC−3		Report		Stadium: Maracanã; Attendance: 53,303; Referee: Bráulio da Silva Machado

26 September 2018 Semi-finals	Corinthians	2–1 (2–1 agg.)	Flamengo	São Paulo
21:45 UTC−3	Avelar 13'; Pedrinho 68'	Report	Henrique 17' (o.g.)	Stadium: Arena Corinthians; Attendance: 44,606; Referee: Ricardo Marques Ribeiro

10 October 2018 Finals	Cruzeiro	1–0	Corinthians	Belo Horizonte
21:45 UTC−3	Thiago Neves 45'	Report		Stadium: Mineirão; Attendance: 53,368; Referee: Anderson Daronco

17 October 2018 Finals	Corinthians	1–2 (1–3 agg.)	Cruzeiro	São Paulo
21:45 UTC−3	Jádson 54' (pen.)	Report	Robinho 27'; De Arrascaeta 81'	Stadium: Arena Corinthians; Attendance: 46,571; Referee: Wagner do Nascimento Magalhães

== See also ==
- List of Sport Club Corinthians Paulista seasons
