= 2017 Sport Club Corinthians Paulista season =

Corinthians
2017 season
- President: Roberto de Andrade
- Manager: Fábio Carille
- Stadium: Arena Corinthians
- Série A: Winners
- Copa do Brasil: Fourth round
- Campeonato Paulista: Winners
- Copa Sudamericana: Round of 16
- Top goalscorer: League: Jô (18); All: Jô (25)
- Highest home attendance: 46,662 vs Ponte Preta (7 May 2017)
- Lowest home attendance: 11,935 vs Novorizontino (15 February 2017)
- Average home league attendance: 40,317
| Home colors | Away colors | Third colors |

The 2017 season was the 108th season in the history of Sport Club Corinthians Paulista.

== Background ==
=== Kits ===
- Home (April 2017 onward): White shirt, black shorts and white socks;
- Away (April 2017 onward): Black shirt, white shorts and black socks;
- Third (September 2017 onward): Dark grey shirt, dark grey shorts and dark grey socks.

=== Previous kits ===
- Home (Until April 2017): White shirt, black shorts and white socks.
- Away (Until April 2017): Black shirt, white shorts and black socks.
- Third (Until September 2017): Purple/blue shirt, blue shorts and blue socks.

=== Squad ===
As of 4 September 2017

Note: Flags indicate national team as defined under FIFA eligibility rules; some limited exceptions apply. Players may hold more than one non-FIFA nationality.

| No. | Pos. | Nation | Player |
|---|---|---|---|
| 1 | GK | BRA | Matheus Vidotto |
| 2 | DF | BRA | Léo Príncipe |
| 3 | DF | BRA | Pablo (on loan from Bordeaux) |
| 4 | DF | PAR | Fabián Balbuena |
| 5 | MF | BRA | Gabriel |
| 6 | DF | BRA | Moisés |
| 7 | FW | BRA | Jô |
| 8 | MF | BRA | Maycon |
| 10 | MF | BRA | Jádson |
| 11 | FW | PAR | Ángel Romero |
| 12 | GK | BRA | Cássio |
| 13 | DF | BRA | Guilherme Arana |
| 14 | DF | BRA | Léo Santos |
| 15 | DF | BRA | Vilson |
| 16 | MF | BRA | Guilherme Mantuan |
| 17 | MF | BRA | Giovanni Augusto |
| 18 | FW | TUR | Colin Kazim-Richards |

| No. | Pos. | Nation | Player |
|---|---|---|---|
| 20 | MF | BRA | Danilo |
| 21 | MF | BRA | Fellipe Bastos |
| 22 | MF | BRA | Marciel |
| 23 | DF | BRA | Fagner |
| 25 | FW | BRA | Clayson |
| 26 | MF | BRA | Rodriguinho |
| 27 | GK | BRA | Walter |
| 28 | MF | BRA | Paulo Roberto |
| 29 | MF | BRA | Camacho |
| 31 | MF | BRA | Marquinhos Gabriel |
| 32 | MF | BRA | Rodrigo Figueiredo |
| 33 | MF | BRA | Warian |
| 34 | DF | BRA | Pedro Henrique |
| 35 | FW | BRA | Carlinhos |
| 38 | MF | BRA | Pedrinho |
| 40 | GK | BRA | Caíque França |

=== Managerial changes ===
On December 15, four days after the 2016 season ended, it was announced that Oswaldo de Oliveira was fired from the club. A week later, assistant manager Fábio Carille was announced as full-time manager for this season.

| Manager | Signed from | Date of signing | Date of departure | Signed with | Source |
|---|---|---|---|---|---|
| (Brazil) Oswaldo de Oliveira | (Brazil) Sport Recife | 14 October 2016 | 15 December 2016 | – | |
| (Brazil) Fábio Carille | Technical staff | 22 December 2016 | – | – | |

=== Transfers ===
==== Transfers in ====
| # | Position: | Player | Transferred from | Fee | Date | Team | Source |
|---|---|---|---|---|---|---|---|
| 7 | FW | (Brazil) Jô | (China) Jiangsu Suning | Free Transfer (Rescinded contract) | 31 October 2016 | First team | |
| 18 | FW | (Turkey) Colin Kazim-Richards | (Brazil) Coritiba | Undisclosed (~R$1,000,000) | 6 January 2017 | First team | |
| 5 | MF | (Brazil) Gabriel | (Brazil) Monte Azul | Undisclosed (R$6,700,000) | 13 January 2017 | First team | |
| 25 | FW | (Brazil) Luidy | (Brazil) CRB | Undisclosed (~R$1,200,000) | 14 January 2017 | First team | |
| 35 | MF | (Brazil) Fellipe Bastos | (United Arab Emirates) Al Ain | Free Transfer (Rescinded contract) | 14 January 2017 | First team | |
| 77 | MF | (Brazil) Jádson | (China) Tianjin Quanjian | Free Transfer (Rescinded contract) | 6 February 2017 | First team | |
| 25 | FW | (Brazil) Clayson | (Brazil) Ponte Preta | R$3,500,000 (also traded for Léo Artur and Claudinho) | 18 May 2017 | First team | |
| 28 | MF | (Brazil) Paulo Roberto | (Brazil) Osasco Audax | Undisclosed | 29 August 2017 | First team | |

==== Loans in ====
| # | Position | Player | Loaned from | Date | Loan expires | Team | Source |
|---|---|---|---|---|---|---|---|
| 28 | MF | (Brazil) Paulo Roberto | (Brazil) Osasco Audax | 14 January 2017 | 31 December 2017 (Signed definitely on 29 August 2017) | First team | |
| 3 | DF | (Brazil) Pablo | (France) Bordeaux | 23 January 2017 | 31 December 2017 | First team | |
| 9 | FW | (Brazil) Clayton | (Brazil) Atlético Mineiro | 27 March 2017 | 31 December 2017 (Canceled on 23 August 2017) | First team | |

==== Transfers out ====
| # | Position | Player | Transferred to | Fee | Date | Team | Source |
|---|---|---|---|---|---|---|---|
| | MF | (Brazil) Dawhan | (Brazil) CSA | Free Transfer (End of contract) | 31 December 2016 | Academy | |
| 6 | DF | (Brazil) Uendel | (Brazil) Internacional | Undisclosed | 17 January 2017 | First team | |
| | FW | (Brazil) Léo Artur | (Brazil) Ponte Preta | Free Transfer (Part of a trade involving Clayson) | 18 May 2017 | First team | |
| | FW | (Brazil) Claudinho | (Brazil) Ponte Preta | Free Transfer (Part of a trade involving Clayson) | 18 May 2017 | First team | |
| 30 | FW | (Brazil) Léo Jabá | (Russia) Akhmat Grozny | €2,000,000 (~R$7,500,000) | 5 July 2017 | First team | |

==== Loans out ====
| # | Position | Player | Loaned to | Date | Loan expires | Team | Source |
|---|---|---|---|---|---|---|---|
| | DF | (Brazil) Rodrigo Sam | (Brazil) Água Santa | 13 December 2016 | 30 April 2017 | First team | |
| | MF | (Brazil) Alan Mineiro | (Brazil) Ferroviária | 2 January 2017 | 30 April 2017 | First team | |
| 9 | FW | (Brazil) Gustavo | (Brazil) Bahia | 6 January 2017 | 31 December 2017 (Canceled on 7 July 2017) | First team | |
| | GK | (Brazil) Douglas | (Brazil) Avaí | 6 January 2017 | 31 December 2017 | First team | |
| | FW | (Brazil) Claudinho | (Brazil) Santo André | 10 January 2017 | 30 April 2017 | First team | |
| 30 | FW | (Brazil) Lucca | (Brazil) Ponte Preta | 17 January 2017 | 31 December 2017 | First team | |
| | FW | (Brazil) Léo Artur | (Brazil) Osasco Audax | 24 January 2017 | 13 April 2017 | First team | |
| 3 | DF | (Brazil) Yago | (Brazil) Ponte Preta | 1 February 2017 | 31 December 2017 | First team | |
| 21 | MF | (Brazil) Jean | (Brazil) Vasco da Gama | 1 February 2017 | 31 December 2017 | First team | |
| | DF | (Brazil) Vinícius Del'Amore | (Brazil) Fortaleza | 9 February 2017 | 31 December 2017 | Academy | |
| 8 | MF | (Brazil) Marlone | (Brazil) Atlético Mineiro | 23 March 2017 | 31 December 2017 | First team | |
| 25 | FW | (Brazil) Luidy | (Brazil) Figueirense | 19 April 2017 | 31 December 2017 | First team | |
| 10 | MF | (Brazil) Guilherme | (Brazil) Atlético Paranaense | 26 April 2017 | 31 December 2018 | First team | |
| | MF | (Brazil) Alan Mineiro | (Brazil) Vila Nova | 29 April 2017 | 31 December 2017 | First team | |
| | DF | (Brazil) Guilherme Romão | (Brazil) Oeste | 22 May 2017 | 31 December 2017 | Academy | |
| 36 | FW | (Brazil) Bruno Paulo | (Brazil) Santa Cruz | 28 May 2017 | 31 December 2017 | First team | |
| | FW | (Brazil) Gabriel Vasconcelos | (Brazil) Oeste | 30 May 2017 | 31 December 2017 | First team | |
| | DF | (Brazil) Rodrigo Sam | (Brazil) Oeste | 31 May 2017 | 31 December 2017 | First team | |
| | FW | (Colombia) Stiven Mendoza | (Brazil) Bahia | 5 June 2017 | 31 December 2017 | First team | |
| | FW | (Brazil) Gustavo | (Brazil) Goiás | 10 July 2017 | 31 December 2017 | First team | |
| | FW | (Brazil) Luciano | (Greece) Panathinaikos | 17 July 2017 | 31 December 2017 | First team | |
| 16 | MF | (Brazil) Cristian | (Brazil) Grêmio | 4 September 2017 | 31 December 2017 | First team | |

== Squad statistics ==
| No. | Pos. | Name | Campeonato Paulista | | Copa Sudamericana | | Campeonato Brasileiro | | Copa do Brasil | | Total | | Discipline | |
| No. | Pos. | Name | Apps | Goals | Apps | Goals | Apps | Goals | Apps | Goals | Apps | Goals | Yellow card | Red card |
|---|---|---|---|---|---|---|---|---|---|---|---|---|---|---|
| 1 | GK | (Brazil) Matheus Vidotto | 0 | 0 | 0 | 0 | 0 | 0 | 0 | 0 | 0 | 0 | 0 | 0 |
| 2 | DF | (Brazil) Léo Príncipe | 5 | 0 | 3 | 0 | 4 (1) | 0 | 0 | 0 | 12 (1) | 0 | 2 | 0 |
| 3 | DF | (Brazil) Pablo | 16 | 2 | 4 | 0 | 24 | 0 | 6 | 0 | 50 | 2 | 7 | 0 |
| 4 | DF | (Paraguay) Fabián Balbuena | 15 | 0 | 6 | 2 | 33 | 4 | 5 | 0 | 59 | 6 | 9 | 0 |
| 5 | MF | (Brazil) Gabriel | 16 | 0 | 6 | 0 | 33 | 1 | 6 | 1 | 61 | 2 | 18 | 1 |
| 6 | DF | (Brazil) Moisés | 4 (4) | 0 | 1 | 0 | 3 (1) | 0 | 0 | 0 | 8 (5) | 0 | 2 | 0 |
| 7 | FW | (Brazil) Jô | 16 (1) | 6 | 4 (1) | 0 | 34 | 18 | 4 (1) | 1 | 58 (3) | 25 | 9 | 1 |
| 8 | MF | (Brazil) Marlone | 4 (2) | 0 | 0 | 0 | 0 | 0 | 1 (2) | 0 | 5 (4) | 0 | 0 | 0 |
| 8 | MF | (Brazil) Maycon | 12 (1) | 2 | 4 | 1 | 32 (4) | 1 | 5 | 1 | 53 (5) | 5 | 6 | 0 |
| 9 | FW | (Brazil) Clayton | 0 (5) | 0 | 1 (3) | 0 | 0 (3) | 2 | 1 (1) | 0 | 2 (12) | 2 | 0 | 0 |
| 10 | MF | (Brazil) Guilherme | 1 (2) | 0 | 0 | 0 | 0 | 0 | 0 (1) | 0 | 1 (3) | 0 | 0 | 0 |
| 10 | MF | (Brazil) Jádson | 11 | 2 | 4 | 2 | 25 (4) | 6 | 3 (1) | 0 | 43 (5) | 10 | 8 | 0 |
| 11 | FW | (Paraguay) Ángel Romero | 10 (5) | 2 | 5 | 0 | 28 (1) | 3 | 5 | 1 | 49 (6) | 6 | 14 | 0 |
| 12 | GK | (Brazil) Cássio | 17 | 0 | 6 | 0 | 35 | 0 | 6 | 0 | 64 | 0 | 3 | 0 |
| 13 | DF | (Brazil) Guilherme Arana | 14 | 0 | 3 | 0 | 32 | 2 | 5 | 0 | 54 | 2 | 7 | 0 |
| 14 | DF | (Brazil) Léo Santos | 0 (1) | 1 | 0 | 0 | 1 (1) | 0 | 0 | 0 | 1 (2) | 1 | 0 | 0 |
| 15 | DF | (Brazil) Vilson | 0 | 0 | 0 | 0 | 0 | 0 | 0 | 0 | 0 | 0 | 0 | 0 |
| 16 | MF | (Brazil) Guilherme Mantuan | 0 | 0 | 0 | 0 | 0 (1) | 0 | 0 | 0 | 0 (1) | 0 | 0 | 0 |
| 17 | MF | (Brazil) Giovanni Augusto | 1 (1) | 0 | 1 (3) | 0 | 3 (8) | 1 | 1 (3) | 0 | 6 (15) | 1 | 3 | 0 |
| 18 | FW | (Turkey) Colin Kazim-Richards | 3 (5) | 1 | 2 (1) | 0 | 4 (10) | 1 | 1 (2) | 0 | 10 (18) | 2 | 2 | 0 |
| 20 | MF | (Brazil) Danilo | 0 | 0 | 0 | 0 | 0 (2) | 0 | 0 | 0 | 0 (2) | 0 | 0 | 0 |
| 21 | MF | (Brazil) Fellipe Bastos | 4 (3) | 0 | 0 (2) | 0 | 2 (5) | 0 | 2 | 0 | 8 (10) | 0 | 3 | 0 |
| 22 | MF | (Brazil) Marciel | 0 (3) | 0 | 2 | 0 | 3 | 0 | 1 | 0 | 6 (3) | 0 | 1 | 0 |
| 23 | DF | (Brazil) Fagner | 13 | 0 | 3 | 0 | 31 | 0 | 6 | 0 | 53 | 0 | 13 | 0 |
| 25 | FW | (Brazil) Clayson | 0 | 0 | 0 | 0 | 12 (17) | 4 | 0 | 0 | 12 (17) | 4 | 6 | 0 |
| 26 | MF | (Brazil) Rodriguinho | 13 (1) | 4 | 3 (1) | 2 | 30 | 3 | 5 | 2 | 53 (2) | 11 | 11 | 1 |
| 27 | GK | (Brazil) Walter | 0 | 0 | 0 | 0 | 1 | 0 | 0 | 0 | 1 | 0 | 0 | 0 |
| 28 | MF | (Brazil) Paulo Roberto | 2 (2) | 0 | 0 (1) | 0 | 4 (4) | 0 | 0 | 0 | 6 (7) | 0 | 1 | 0 |
| 29 | MF | (Brazil) Camacho | 5 (5) | 0 | 2 (4) | 0 | 9 (18) | 0 | 0 (2) | 0 | 16 (29) | 0 | 3 | 0 |
| 30 | FW | (Brazil) Léo Jabá | 6 (7) | 1 | 0 | 0 | 0 (1) | 0 | 1 (2) | 0 | 7 (10) | 1 | 2 | 0 |
| 31 | MF | (Brazil) Marquinhos Gabriel | 1 (2) | 0 | 3 | 0 | 10 (15) | 3 | 1 (2) | 0 | 15 (19) | 3 | 7 | 0 |
| 32 | MF | (Brazil) Rodrigo Figueiredo | 0 | 0 | 0 | 0 | 1 (1) | 0 | 0 | 0 | 1 (1) | 0 | 0 | 0 |
| 33 | MF | (Brazil) Warian | 0 | 0 | 0 | 0 | 0 | 0 | 0 | 0 | 0 | 0 | 0 | 0 |
| 34 | DF | (Brazil) Pedro Henrique | 5 | 1 | 2 | 0 | 19 (3) | 1 | 1 | 0 | 27 (3) | 2 | 1 | 0 |
| 35 | FW | (Brazil) Carlinhos | 0 | 0 | 0 | 0 | 0 (1) | 0 | 0 | 0 | 0 (1) | 0 | 0 | 0 |
| 38 | MF | (Brazil) Pedrinho | 3 (3) | 0 | 0 (2) | 1 | 1 (11) | 0 | 0 | 0 | 4 (16) | 1 | 0 | 0 |
| 40 | GK | (Brazil) Caíque França | 1 | 0 | 0 | 0 | 2 (1) | 0 | 0 | 0 | 3 (1) | 0 | 0 | 0 |

== Overview ==
| Competition | First match | Last match | Starting round | Final position | Record | | | | | | | |
| Competition | First match | Last match | Starting round | Final position | Pld | W | D | L | GF | GA | GD | Win % |
|---|---|---|---|---|---|---|---|---|---|---|---|---|
| Série A | 13 May 2017 | 3 December 2017 | Matchday 1 | Winners | 38 | 21 | 9 | 8 | 50 | 30 | +20 | 55.26 |
| Copa do Brasil | 8 February 2017 | 19 April 2017 | First stage | Fourth stage | 6 | 2 | 4 | 0 | 6 | 2 | +4 | 33.33 |
| Campeonato Paulista | 4 February 2017 | 7 May 2017 | Matchday 1 | Winners | 18 | 10 | 6 | 2 | 22 | 11 | +11 | 55.56 |
| Copa Sudamericana | 5 April 2017 | 20 September 2017 | First stage | Round of 16 | 6 | 3 | 3 | 0 | 8 | 3 | +5 | 50.00 |
| Total | | | | | 68 | 36 | 22 | 10 | 86 | 46 | +40 | 52.94 |

Source: Competitions

== Pre-season and friendlies ==
=== Florida Cup ===
| 18 January 2017 Semifinal | Vasco da Gama (Brazil) | 1–4 | (Brazil) Corinthians | Orlando, United States |
| 19:00 UTC−05:00 | Éder Luís 24' | Report | Camacho 20'; Marlone 45'; Kazim-Richards 81'; Marquinhos Gabriel 89' | Stadium: Bright House Networks Stadium; Referee: Esteban Rosano |

| 21 January 2017 Final | Corinthians (Brazil) | 0–0 (3–4 p) | (Brazil) São Paulo | Orlando, United States |
| 18:00 UTC−05:00 | | Report | | Stadium: Bright House Networks Stadium; Referee: Jonathan Weiner |
| | Penalties |
| | Fellipe Bastos (penalty missed); Giovanni Augusto (penalty scored); Marciel (penalty missed); Paulo Roberto (penalty scored); Marlone (penalty scored) | | (penalty scored) João Schmidt; (penalty scored) Cícero; (penalty missed) Araruna; (penalty scored) Júnior Tavares; (penalty scored) Gilberto |

=== Friendlies ===
| 1 February 2017 Friendly | Corinthians (Brazil) | 1–0 | (Brazil) Ferroviária | São Paulo, Brazil |
| 21:45 UTC−02:00 | Marquinhos Gabriel 90+4' | Report | | Stadium: Arena Corinthians; Attendance: 22,231; Referee: Leandro Bizzio Marinho |

Last updated: 1 February 2017

== Campeonato Paulista ==
For the 2017 Campeonato Paulista, the 16 teams are divided in four groups of 4 teams (A, B, C, D). They will face all teams, except those that are in their own group, with the top two teams from each group qualifying for the quarterfinals. The two overall worst teams will be relegated.

=== Statistics ===
Group A
| Pos | Team | Pld | W | D | L | GF | GA | GD | Pts | Qualification |
|---|---|---|---|---|---|---|---|---|---|---|
| 1 | Corinthians | 12 | 7 | 3 | 2 | 14 | 9 | +5 | 24 | knockout stage |
| 2 | Botafogo-SP | 12 | 4 | 5 | 3 | 13 | 10 | +3 | 17 | knockout stage |
| 3 | Ituano | 12 | 3 | 5 | 4 | 11 | 12 | −1 | 14 | |
| 4 | São Bernardo | 12 | 3 | 1 | 8 | 10 | 17 | −7 | 10 | |

Source: Soccerway

=== First stage ===
| 4 February 2017 1 | São Bento | 0–1 | Corinthians | Sorocaba |
| 17:00 UTC−02:00 | | Report | Jô 54' (pen.) | Stadium: Estádio Walter Ribeiro; Attendance: 6,007; Referee: Raphael Claus |

| 11 February 2017 2 | Corinthians | 0–2 | Santo André | São Paulo |
| 21:00 UTC−02:00 | | Report | Edmílson 11'; Claudinho 67' | Stadium: Arena Corinthians; Attendance: 18,271; Referee: Salim Fende Chavez |

| 15 February 2017 3 | Corinthians | 1–0 | Novorizontino | São Paulo |
| 19:30 UTC−02:00 | Pablo 27' | Report | | Stadium: Arena Corinthians; Attendance: 11,935; Referee: Flávio Rodrigues de Souza |

| 18 February 2017 4 | Osasco Audax | 0–1 | Corinthians | Osasco |
| 17:00 UTC−02:00 | | Report | Kazim-Richards 29' | Stadium: Estádio José Liberatti; Attendance: 6,630; Referee: José Cláudio Rocha Filho |

| 22 February 2017 5 | Corinthians | 1–0 | Palmeiras | São Paulo |
| 21:45 UTC−03:00 | Jô 87' | Report | | Stadium: Arena Corinthians; Attendance: 31,101; Referee: Thiago Duarte Peixoto |

| 25 February 2017 6 | Mirassol | 2–3 | Corinthians | Mirassol |
| 19:30 UTC−03:00 | Zé Roberto 28'; Xuxa 81' | Report | Pablo 38'; Maycon 43'; Pedro Henrique 83' | Stadium: Estádio Municipal José Maria de Campos Maia; Attendance: 8,961; Referee: Vinícius Furlan |

| 4 March 2017 7 | Corinthians | 1–0 | Santos | São Paulo |
| 18:30 UTC−03:00 | Jô 46' | Report | | Stadium: Arena Corinthians; Attendance: 36,378; Referee: Leandro Bizzio Marinho |

| 12 March 2017 8 | Ponte Preta | 1–1 | Corinthians | Campinas |
| 16:00 UTC−03:00 | Lucca 35' | Report | Léo Santos 76' | Stadium: Estádio Moisés Lucarelli; Attendance: 10,740; Referee: Vinícius Gonçalves Dias Araújo |

| 19 March 2017 9 | Ferroviária | 1–0 | Corinthians | Araraquara |
| 16:00 UTC−03:00 | Alan Mineiro 49' | Report | | Stadium: Arena da Fonte Luminosa; Referee: Raphael Claus |

| 23 March 2017 10 | Corinthians | 1–1 | Red Bull Brasil | São Paulo |
| 17:00 UTC−03:00 | Maycon 72' | Report | Guilherme Lazaroni 90+1' | Stadium: Arena Corinthians; Attendance: 17,095; Referee: Salim Fende Chavez |

| 26 March 2017 11 | São Paulo | 1–1 | Corinthians | São Paulo |
| 17:00 UTC−03:00 | Maicon 49' | Report | Jô 63' | Stadium: Estádio do Morumbi; Attendance: 51,869; Referee: Vinícius Furlan |

| 29 March 2017 12 | Corinthians | 3–1 | Linense | São Paulo |
| 21:45 UTC−03:00 | Léo Jabá 10'; Jádson 38'; Romero 66' | Report | Thiago Humberto 75' | Stadium: Arena Corinthians; Attendance: 12,369; Referee: José Cláudio Rocha Filho |

=== Knockout stages ===
| 1 April 2017 Quarter-finals | Botafogo | 0–0 | Corinthians | Ribeirão Preto |
| 18:30 UTC−03:00 | | Report | | Stadium: Estádio Santa Cruz; Referee: Flávio Rodrigues de Souza |

| 9 April 2017 Quarter-finals | Corinthians | 1–0 (1–0 agg.) | Botafogo | São Paulo |
| 16:00 UTC−03:00 | Rodriguinho 37' | Report | | Stadium: Arena Corinthians; Attendance: 33,847; Referee: Marcelo Aparecido Ribeiro de Souza |

| 16 April 2017 Semi-finals | São Paulo | 0–2 | Corinthians | São Paulo |
| 19:00 UTC−03:00 | | Report | Jô 20'; Rodriguinho 45+2' | Stadium: Estádio do Morumbi; Attendance: 45,366; Referee: Luis Flávio de Oliveira |

| 23 April 2017 Semi-finals | Corinthians | 1–1 (3–1 agg.) | São Paulo | São Paulo |
| 16:00 UTC−03:00 | Jô 45+1' | Report | Pratto 83' | Stadium: Arena Corinthians; Attendance: 43,394; Referee: Flávio Rodrigues de Souza |

| 30 April 2017 Finals | Ponte Preta | 0–3 | Corinthians | Campinas |
| 16:00 UTC−03:00 | | Report | Rodriguinho 13', 79'; Jádson 58' | Stadium: Estádio Moisés Lucarelli; Attendance: 17,322; Referee: Raphael Claus |

| 7 May 2017 Finals | Corinthians | 1–1 (4–1 agg.) | Ponte Preta | São Paulo |
| 16:00 UTC−03:00 | Romero 62' | Report | Marllon 85' | Stadium: Arena Corinthians; Attendance: 46,662; Referee: Leandro Bizzio Marinho |

== Copa Sudamericana ==
=== Elimination stages ===
| 5 April 2017 First stage | Corinthians (Brazil) | 2–0 | Universidad de Chile | São Paulo, Brazil |
| 21:45 UTC−03:00 | Rodriguinho 40'; Jádson 68' | Report | | Stadium: Arena Corinthians; Attendance: 22,957; Referee: Darío Herrera (Argentina) |

| 10 May 2017 First stage | Universidad de Chile | 1–2 (1–4 agg.) | (Brazil) Corinthians | Santiago, Chile |
| 21:45 UTC−03:00 | Mora 64' | Report | Rodriguinho 36'; Jádson 55' | Stadium: Estadio Nacional; Referee: Daniel Fedorczuk (Uruguay) |

| 28 June 2017 Second stage | Patriotas (Colombia) | 1–1 | (Brazil) Corinthians | Tunja, Colombia |
| 19:45 UTC−05:00 | Gómez 30' | Report | Balbuena 90+2' | Stadium: Estadio La Independencia; Referee: Mario Díaz de Vivar (Paraguay) |

| 26 July 2017 Second stage | Corinthians (Brazil) | 2–0 (3–1 agg.) | (Colombia) Patriotas | São Paulo, Brazil |
| 21:45 UTC−03:00 | Balbuena 27'; Pedrinho 90' | Report | | Stadium: Arena Corinthians; Attendance: 34,808; Referee: Roberto Tobar (Chile) |

=== Final stages ===
| 13 September 2017 Round of 16 | Corinthians (Brazil) | 1–1 | (Argentina) Racing | São Paulo, Brazil |
| 21:45 UTC−3 | Maycon 29' | Report | Triverio 74' | Stadium: Arena Corinthians; Attendance: 25,776; Referee: Éber Aquino (Paraguay) |

| 20 September 2017 Round of 16 | Racing (Argentina) | 0–0 (1–1 agg.) | (Brazil) Corinthians | Avellaneda, Argentina |
| 21:45 UTC−3 | | Report | | Stadium: Estadio Presidente Juan Domingo Perón; Referee: Leodán González (Uruguay) |

== Campeonato Brasileiro ==
| Pos | Team | Pld | W | D | L | GF | GA | GD | Pts | Qualification or relegation |
|---|---|---|---|---|---|---|---|---|---|---|
| 1 | Corinthians (C) | 38 | 21 | 9 | 8 | 50 | 30 | +20 | 72 | Qualification for Copa Libertadores group stage |
| 2 | Palmeiras | 38 | 19 | 6 | 13 | 61 | 45 | +16 | 63 | Qualification for Copa Libertadores group stage |
| 3 | Santos | 38 | 17 | 12 | 9 | 42 | 32 | +10 | 63 | Qualification for Copa Libertadores group stage |
| 4 | Grêmio | 38 | 18 | 8 | 12 | 55 | 36 | +19 | 62 | Qualification for Copa Libertadores group stage |
| 5 | Cruzeiro | 38 | 15 | 12 | 11 | 47 | 39 | +8 | 57 | Qualification for Copa Libertadores group stage |

Source: CBF
Rules for classification: 1) points; 2) wins; 3) goal difference; 4) goals scored; 5) head-to-head results; 6) least red cards received; 7) least yellow cards received; 8) draw.
(C) Champions

=== Results ===
| 13 May 2017 1 | Corinthians | 1–1 | Chapecoense | São Paulo |
| 19:00 UTC−03:00 | Jô 22' | Report | Wellington Paulista 55' | Stadium: Arena Corinthians; Attendance: 31,724; Referee: Elmo Alves Resende Cunha |

| 21 May 2017 2 | Vitória | 0–1 | Corinthians | Salvador |
| 16:00 UTC−03:00 | | Report | Jô 75' | Stadium: Itaipava Arena Fonte Nova; Attendance: 16,615; Referee: Péricles Bassols |

| 28 May 2017 3 | Atlético Goianense | 0–1 | Corinthians | Goiânia |
| 16:00 UTC−03:00 | | Report | Rodriguinho 26' | Stadium: Estádio Serra Dourada; Attendance: 13,712; Referee: Paulo Henrique Vollkopf |

| 3 June 2017 4 | Corinthians | 2–0 | Santos | São Paulo |
| 19:00 UTC−03:00 | Romero 69'; Jô 74' | Report | | Stadium: Arena Corinthians; Attendance: 40,436; Referee: Anderson Daronco |

| 7 June 2017 5 | Vasco da Gama | 2–5 | Corinthians | Rio de Janeiro |
| 21:45 UTC−03:00 | Luís Fabiano 46', 47' | Report | Marquinhos Gabriel 3'; Jô 38'; Maycon 57'; Clayton 83', 90+1' | Stadium: Estádio São Januário; Attendance: 16,288; Referee: Wagner Reway |

| 11 June 2017 6 | Corinthians | 3–2 | São Paulo | São Paulo |
| 16:00 UTC−03:00 | Romero 6'; Gabriel 49'; Jádson 62' (pen.) | Report | Gilberto 17'; Wellington Nem 83' | Stadium: Arena Corinthians; Attendance: 42,925; Referee: Ricardo Marques Ribeiro |

| 14 June 2017 7 | Corinthians | 1–0 | Cruzeiro | São Paulo |
| 21:45 UTC−03:00 | Balbuena 42' | Report | | Stadium: Arena Corinthians; Attendance: 30,774; Referee: Leandro Vuaden |

| 18 June 2017 8 | Coritiba | 0–0 | Corinthians | Curitiba |
| 11:00 UTC−03:00 | | Report | | Stadium: Estádio Couto Pereira; Attendance: 25,182; Referee: Marcelo de Lima Henrique |

| 22 June 2017 9 | Corinthians | 3–0 | Bahia | São Paulo |
| 19:30 UTC−03:00 | Jô 25'; Balbuena 79'; Marquinhos Gabriel 90+2' | Report | | Stadium: Arena Corinthians; Attendance: 34,494; Referee: Dewson Fernando Freitas |

| 25 June 2017 10 | Grêmio | 0–1 | Corinthians | Porto Alegre |
| 16:00 UTC−03:00 | | Report | Jádson 51' | Stadium: Arena do Grêmio; Attendance: 54,022; Referee: Wilton Pereira Sampaio |

| 2 July 2017 11 | Corinthians | 1–0 | Botafogo | São Paulo |
| 16:00 UTC−03:00 | Jô 78' | Report | | Stadium: Arena Corinthians; Attendance: 40,658; Referee: Rodolpho Toski Marques |

| 8 July 2017 12 | Corinthians | 2–0 | Ponte Preta | São Paulo |
| 19:00 UTC−03:00 | Jádson 45+1'; Jô 46' | Report | | Stadium: Arena Corinthians; Attendance: 33,124; Referee: Ricardo Marques Ribeiro |

| 12 July 2017 13 | Palmeiras | 0–2 | Corinthians | São Paulo |
| 21:45 UTC−03:00 | | Report | Jádson 22' (pen.); Arana 64' | Stadium: Allianz Parque; Attendance: 39,091; Referee: Leandro Vuaden |

| 15 July 2017 14 | Corinthians | 2–2 | Atlético Paranaense | São Paulo |
| 19:00 UTC−03:00 | Jô 44', 50' | Report | Jonathan 37'; Otávio 81' | Stadium: Arena Corinthians; Attendance: 41,458; Referee: Sandro Meira Ricci |

| 19 July 2017 15 | Avaí | 0–0 | Corinthians | Florianópolis |
| 21:00 UTC−03:00 | | Report | | Stadium: Estádio da Ressacada; Attendance: 10,926; Referee: Wilton Pereira Sampaio |

| 23 July 2017 16 | Fluminense | 0–1 | Corinthians | Rio de Janeiro |
| 16:00 UTC−03:00 | | Report | Balbuena 49' | Stadium: Estádio do Maracanã; Attendance: 23,863; Referee: Rafael Traci |

| 30 July 2017 17 | Corinthians | 1–1 | Flamengo | São Paulo |
| 16:00 UTC−03:00 | Jô 21' | Report | Réver 70' | Stadium: Arena Corinthians; Attendance: 45,110; Referee: Ricardo Marques Ribeiro |

| 2 August 2017 18 | Atlético Mineiro | 0–2 | Corinthians | Belo Horizonte |
| 21:00 UTC−03:00 | | Report | Jô 31'; Rodriguinho 81' | Stadium: Mineirão; Attendance: 45,259; Referee: Anderson Daronco |

| 5 August 2017 19 | Corinthians | 3–1 | Sport Recife | São Paulo |
| 19:00 UTC−03:00 | Arana 8'; Rodriguinho 46'; Pedro Henrique 65' | Report | Thallyson 82' | Stadium: Arena Corinthians; Attendance: 41,522; Referee: Wagner Reway |

| 19 August 2017 21 | Corinthians | 0–1 | Vitória | São Paulo |
| 16:00 UTC−03:00 | | Report | Tréllez 11' | Stadium: Arena Corinthians; Attendance: 42,326; Referee: Eduardo Tomaz Valadão |

| 23 August 2017 (Note: Due to Chapecoense's participation at the 2017 Joan Gamper Trophy and 2017 Suruga Bank Championship the match was postponed to August 23.) 20 | Chapecoense | 0–1 | Corinthians | Chapecó |
| 19:30 UTC−03:00 | | Report | Jô 89' | Stadium: Arena Condá; Attendance: 15,830; Referee: Paulo Roberto Alves Júnior |

| 26 August 2017 22 | Corinthians | 0–1 | Atlético Goianense | São Paulo |
| 19:00 UTC−03:00 | | Report | Gilvan 47' | Stadium: Arena Corinthians; Attendance: 40,811; Referee: Péricles Bassols |

| 10 September 2017 23 | Santos | 2–0 | Corinthians | Santos |
| 16:00 UTC−03:00 | Lucas Lima 57'; Ricardo Oliveira 90+2' | Report | | Stadium: Vila Belmiro; Attendance: 12,567; Referee: Raphael Claus |

| 17 September 2017 24 | Corinthians | 1–0 | Vasco da Gama | São Paulo |
| 16:00 UTC−03:00 | Jô 73' | Report | | Stadium: Arena Corinthians; Attendance: 41,593; Referee: Elmo Alves Resende Cunha |

| 24 September 2017 25 | São Paulo | 1–1 | Corinthians | São Paulo |
| 11:00 UTC−03:00 | Petros 27' | Report | Clayson 77' | Stadium: Estádio do Morumbi; Attendance: 61,142; Referee: Wagner do Nascimento Magalhães |

| 1 October 2017 26 | Cruzeiro | 1–1 | Corinthians | Belo Horizonte |
| 16:00 UTC−03:00 | Rafinha 19' | Report | Clayson 84' (pen.) | Stadium: Mineirão; Attendance: 29,556; Referee: Rodolpho Toski Marques |

| 11 October 2017 27 | Corinthians | 3–1 | Coritiba | São Paulo |
| 21:00 UTC−03:00 | Jô 9'; Clayson 78', 88' | Report | Henrique Almeida 39' | Stadium: Arena Corinthians; Attendance: 36,698; Referee: Claudio Francisco Lima e Silva |

| 15 October 2017 28 | Bahia | 2–0 | Corinthians | Salvador |
| 18:00 UTC−03:00 | Vinícius 71'; Régis 90+3' | Report | | Stadium: Itaipava Arena Fonte Nova; Attendance: 23,413; Referee: Ricardo Marques Ribeiro |

| 18 October 2017 29 | Corinthians | 0–0 | Grêmio | São Paulo |
| 21:00 UTC−02:00 | | Report | | Stadium: Arena Corinthians; Attendance: 40,299; Referee: Héber Roberto Lopes |

| 23 October 2017 30 | Botafogo | 2–1 | Corinthians | Rio de Janeiro |
| 20:00 UTC−02:00 | Brenner 53'; Igor Rabello 75' | Report | Jô 59' | Stadium: Estádio Nilton Santos; Attendance: 8,466; Referee: Rodrigo Raposo |

| 29 October 2017 31 | Ponte Preta | 1–0 | Corinthians | Campinas |
| 17:00 UTC−02:00 | Lucca 39' | Report | | Stadium: Estádio Moisés Lucarelli; Attendance: 13,121; Referee: Marcelo Aparecido de Souza |

| 5 November 2017 32 | Corinthians | 3–2 | Palmeiras | São Paulo |
| 17:00 UTC−02:00 | Romero 27'; Balbuena 29'; Jô 37' (pen.) | Report | Mina 34'; Moisés 67' | Stadium: Arena Corinthians; Attendance: 46,493; Referee: Anderson Daronco |

| 8 November 2017 33 | Atlético Paranaense | 0–1 | Corinthians | Curitiba |
| 21:00 UTC−02:00 | | Report | Giovanni Augusto 76' | Stadium: Arena da Baixada; Attendance: 19,394; Referee: Wagner do Nascimento Magalhães |

| 11 November 2017 34 | Corinthians | 1–0 | Avaí | São Paulo |
| 19:00 UTC−02:00 | Kazim-Richards 48' | Report | | Stadium: Arena Corinthians; Attendance: 43,013; Referee: Dewson Fernando Freitas da Silva |

| 15 November 2017 35 | Corinthians | 3–1 | Fluminense | São Paulo |
| 21:45 UTC−02:00 | Jô 46', 48'; Jádson 84' | Report | Henrique 1' | Stadium: Arena Corinthians; Attendance: 46,189; Referee: Bráulio da Silva Machado |

| 19 November 2017 36 | Flamengo | 3–0 | Corinthians | Rio de Janeiro |
| 17:00 UTC−02:00 | Mancuello 21'; Diego 32' (pen.); Felipe Vizeu 45' | Report | | Stadium: Ilha do Urubu; Attendance: 13,491; Referee: Wagner Reway |

| 26 November 2017 37 | Corinthians | 2–2 | Atlético Mineiro | São Paulo |
| 17:00 UTC−02:00 | Jádson 35'; Marquinhos Gabriel 57' | Report | Otero 28'; Fred 64' | Stadium: Arena Corinthians; Attendance: 46,369; Referee: Wagner do Nascimento Magalhães |

| 3 December 2017 38 | Sport Recife | 1–0 | Corinthians | Recife |
| 16:00 UTC−03:00 | André 55' | Report | | Stadium: Ilha do Retiro; Attendance: 29,977; Referee: Ricardo Marques Ribeiro |

== Copa do Brasil ==
=== Preliminary stages ===
| 8 February 2017 First round | Caldense | 0–1 | Corinthians | Poços de Caldas |
| 21:45 UTC−02:00 | | Report | Rodriguinho 39' | Stadium: Estádio Dr. Ronaldo Junqueira; Attendance: 7,536; Referee: Bruno Arleu de Araújo |

| 1 March 2017 Second round | Brusque | 0–0 (4–5 p) | Corinthians | Brusque |
| 21:45 UTC−03:00 | | Report | | Stadium: Estádio Augusto Bauer; Attendance: 4,070; Referee: Péricles Bassols |
| | Penalties |
| | Jonatas Belusso (penalty scored); Willian (penalty scored); Eliomar (penalty scored); Ricardo Lobo (penalty scored); João Carlos (penalty missed); Carlos Alberto (penalty missed) | | (penalty missed) Jádson; (penalty scored) Giovanni Augusto; (penalty scored) Maycon; (penalty scored) Fagner; (penalty scored) Jô; (penalty scored) Romero |

| 9 March 2017 Third round | Luverdense | 0–2 | Corinthians | Cuiabá |
| 20:30 UTC−04:00 | | Report | Rodriguinho 20'; Gabriel 24' | Stadium: Arena Pantanal; Attendance: 13,248; Referee: Leonardo Garcia Cavaleiro |

| 16 March 2017 Third round | Corinthians | 1–1 (3–1 agg.) | Luverdense | São Paulo |
| 19:30 UTC−03:00 | Jô 29' | Report | Ricardo 71' | Stadium: Arena Corinthians; Attendance: 25,311; Referee: Paulo Henrique Schleich Volkopf |

| 12 April 2017 Fourth round | Internacional | 1–1 | Corinthians | Porto Alegre |
| 21:45 UTC−03:00 | Rodrigo Dourado 56' | Report | Romero 52' | Stadium: Estádio Beira-Rio; Attendance: 37,259; Referee: Wagner do Nascimento Magalhães |

| 19 April 2017 Fourth round | Corinthians | 1–1 (2–2 agg.) (3–4 p) | Internacional | São Paulo |
| 21:45 UTC−03:00 | Maycon 7' | Report | Fagner 71' (o.g.) | Stadium: Arena Corinthians; Attendance: 32,691; Referee: Marcelo de Lima Henrique |
| | Penalties |
| | Jádson (penalty scored); Maycon (penalty missed); Jô (penalty scored); Marquinhos Gabriel (penalty missed); Fagner (penalty scored); Arana (penalty missed) | | (penalty scored) Brenner; (penalty missed) William; (penalty scored) Valdívia; (penalty scored) Cuesta; (penalty missed) Léo Ortiz; (penalty scored) Diego |

== See also ==
- List of Sport Club Corinthians Paulista seasons
