= Guilherme Romão =

Brazilian footballer (born 1997)

Personal information
- Full name: Guilherme Kennedy Romão
- Date of birth: 7 October 1997 (age 29)
- Place of birth: Marília, Brazil
- Height: 1.79 m (5 ft 10 in)
- Position: Left-back

Team information
- Current team: Santa Clara (on loan from Atlético Goianiense)
- Number: 5

Youth career
- 2012–2015: Marília
- 2013: → Osvaldo Cruz (loan)
- 2015–2017: Corinthians

Senior career*
Years	Team	Apps	(Gls)
2017–2020	Corinthians	2	(0)
2017	→ Oeste (loan)	23	(0)
2018	→ Oeste (loan)	13	(0)
2019	→ São Bento (loan)	26	(2)
2020	Botafogo-SP	33	(1)
2021–2024	CRB	111	(3)
2024	→ Atlético Goianiense (loan)	47	(3)
2024–	Atlético Goianiense	48	(3)
2026–	→ Santa Clara (loan)	19	(0)
- * Club domestic league appearances and goals as of 20:02, 20 September 2026 (UTC)

Guilerme Kennedy Romão (born 7 October 1997) is a Brazilian professional footballer who plays as a left-back for Santa Clara, on loan from Atlético Goianiense.

== Club career ==
Born in Marília, São Paulo, Romão joined Corinthians' youth setup in 2015, from hometown club Marília. On 28 April 2017, he renewed his contract until 2020.

On 22 May 2017, Romão was loaned to Série B club Oeste until the end of the season. He made his professional debut four days later, coming on as a half-time substitute for Daniel Borges in a 1–1 away draw against Boa Esporte.

Romão finished the campaign with 23 appearances, as his side narrowly missed out promotion; he subsequently returned to his parent club, being included in the first team squad.

On 31 January 2026, Romão moved abroad for the first time in his career, joining Portuguese Primeira Liga club Santa Clara, on loan from Atlético Goianiense until the end of the season, with an optional buy-clause.

== Career statistics ==
As of 20 September 2026

Club	Season	League			State league		Cup		Continental		Other		Total	
Club	Season	Division	Apps	Goals	Apps	Goals	Apps	Goals	Apps	Goals	Apps	Goals	Apps	Goals
Corinthians	2017	Série A	0	0	0	0	0	0	0	0	—		0	0
Corinthians	2018	Série A	0	0	2	0	0	0	0	0	—		2	0
Corinthians	Total		0	0	2	0	0	0	0	0	—		2	0
Oeste (loan)	2017	Série B	23	0	—		—		—		—		23	0
Oeste (loan)	2018	Série B	13	0	—		—		—		—		13	0
São Bento (loan)	2019	Série B	20	2	6	0	—		—		—		26	2
Botafogo-SP	2020	Série B	31	1	2	0	—		—		—		33	1
CRB	2021	Série B	35	0	7	2	6	1	—		9 (Note: Appearances in Copa do Nordeste)	0	57	3
CRB	2022	Série B	26	0	9	0	1	0	—		9	0	45	0
CRB	2023	Série B	24	1	10	0	4	0	—		8	0	46	1
CRB	Total		85	1	26	2	11	1	—		26	0	148	4
Atlético Goianiense (loan)	2024	Série A	32	1	15	2	6	0	—		—		53!!3	
Atlético Goianiense	2025	Série B	30	2	13	0	2	0	—		—		45	2
Atlético Goianiense	2026	Série B	0	0	5	1	0	0	—		—		5	1
Atlético Goianiense	Total		30	2	18	1	2	0	—		—		50	3
Santa Clara (loan)	2025–26	Primeira Liga	12	0	—		—		—		—		12	0
Santa Clara (loan)	2026–27	Primeira Liga	7	0	—		0	0	—		0	0	7	0
Santa Clara (loan)	Total		19	0	—		0	0	—		0	0	19	0
Career total			253	7	69	5	19	1	0	0	26	0	367	13

== Honours ==
Corinthians

- Campeonato Paulista: 2018
