= Clayson (footballer) =

Brazilian footballer (born 1995)

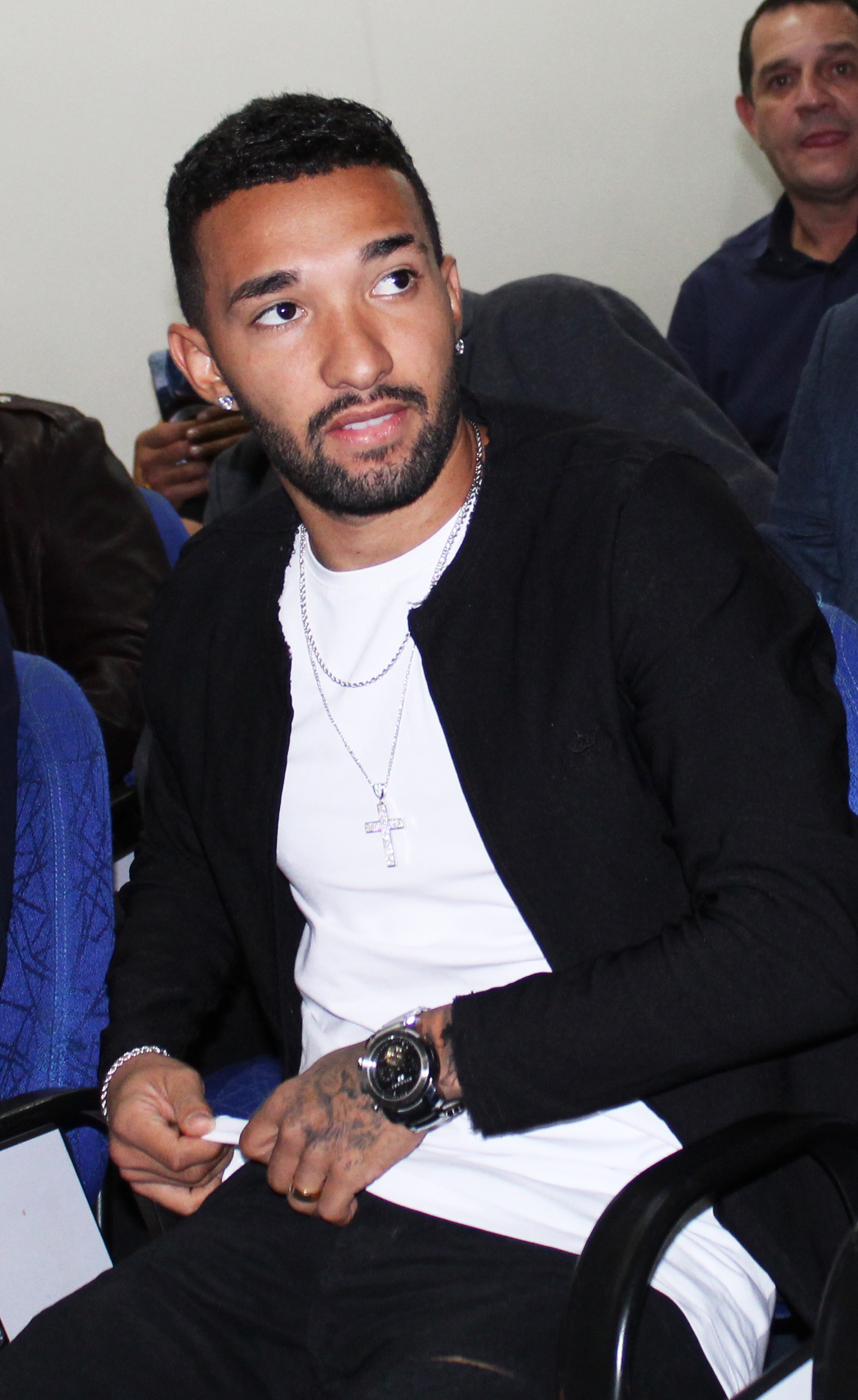

Personal information
- Full name: Clayson Henrique da Silva Vieira
- Date of birth: 19 March 1995 (age 31)
- Place of birth: Botucatu, Brazil
- Height: 1.66 m (5 ft 5 1/2 in)
- Position: Winger

Team information
- Current team: Sport Recife
- Number: 25

Youth career
- AA Botucatuense
- 2011–2012: União São João
- 2012: → Grêmio (loan)
- 2013–2014: Ituano

Senior career*
Years	Team	Apps	(Gls)
2012	União São João	3	(1)
2013–2015	Ituano	28	(2)
2015	→ Ponte Preta (loan)	12	(0)
2016–2017	Ponte Preta	62	(6)
2017–2019	Corinthians	112	(12)
2020–2022	Bahia	23	(3)
2021–2022	→ Cuiabá (loan)	32	(3)
2022	Al-Faisaly	8	(1)
2022–2023	V-Varen Nagasaki	25	(4)
2023–2024	Cuiabá	56	(12)
2025	Mirassol	6	(0)
2025	Coritiba	22	(0)
2026–	Sport Recife	24	(1)
- * Club domestic league appearances and goals as of 16 November 2026

Clayson Henrique da Silva Vieira (born 19 March 1995), simply known as Clayson, is a Brazilian footballer who plays as a left winger for Sport Recife.

== Club career ==
=== Early career ===
Born in Botucatu, São Paulo, Clayson made his senior debuts for União São João in 2012, aged only 16. After scoring one goal in three appearances, he was loaned to Grêmio, returning to youth setup.

=== Ituano ===
On 18 February 2013 Clayson joined Ituano, making his debut for the club on 24 March, coming on as a second-half substitute in a 1–2 home loss against Oeste for the Campeonato Paulista championship. He scored his first professional goal on 15 March 2015, netting his side's only in a 1–2 loss at Grêmio Osasco Audax.

=== Ponte Preta ===
On 28 August 2015, Clayson signed for Série A club Ponte Preta, on loan until the end of the year. He made his debut in the category on 2 September, replacing Biro-Biro in a 1–2 home loss against Cruzeiro.

On 18 November 2015, Ponte bought Clayson outright, with his new five-year contract being effective the following January. He established himself as a starter for the club during the season, and scored his first top tier goal on 3 June 2016 by netting the second in a 2–1 away win against América Mineiro.

=== Corinthians ===
In June 2017, Clayson joined Corinthians, where he was part of the squad that won the 2017 Campeonato Brasileiro Série A.

=== Bahia ===
In 2020 he joined Bahia. He was loaned out to Cuiaba for the 2021 season.

=== Al-Faisaly ===
On 30 January 2022, Clayson joined Saudi Arabian club Al-Faisaly.

=== V-Varen Nagasaki ===
On 11 July 2022, Clayson joined Japanese club V-Varen Nagasaki.

=== Cuiaba ===
In June 2023 Cuiaba bought Clayson. On 6 August 2023, he scored in a 3–0 victory against Flamengo.

== Career statistics ==
As of 25 October 2021

Club	Season	League			State League		Cup		Continental		Other		Total	
Club	Season	Division	Apps	Goals	Apps	Goals	Apps	Goals	Apps	Goals	Apps	Goals	Apps	Goals
União São João	2012	Paulista A2	—		3	1	—		—		—		3	1
Ituano	2013	Paulista	—		5	0	—		—		18 (Note: Appearance(s) in Copa Paulista)	2	23	2
Ituano	2014	Série D	7	0	2	0	—		—		—		9	0
Ituano	2015	Paulista	—		14	2	7	2	—		5	0	26	4
Ituano	Subtotal		7	0	21	2	7	2	—		23	2	58	6
Ponte Preta	2015	Série A	12	0	—		—		—		—		12	0
Ponte Preta	2016	Série A	32	3	12	0	7	0	—		—		51	3
Ponte Preta	2017	Série A	1	2	17	1	1	0	2 (Note: Appearance(s) in Copa Sudamericana)	0	—		21	3
Ponte Preta	Subtotal		45	5	29	1	8	0	2	0	—		84	6
Corinthians	2017	Série A	29	4	—		—		—		—		29	4
Corinthians	2018	Série A	23	1	15	2	6	0	4 (Note: Appearance(s) in Copa Libertadores)	0	—		48	3
Corinthians	2019	Série A	32	3	13	2	7	0	10	2	—		62	7
Corinthians	Subtotal		84	8	28	4	13	0	14	2	—		139	14
Bahia	2020	Série A	21	3	2	0	1	0	6	0	12 (Note: Appearance(s) in Copa do Nordeste)	0	42	3
Cuiabá (loan)	2021	Série A	25	2	7	1	1	0	—		0	0	33	3
Career total			182	17	90	9	30	2	22	2	35	2	359	33

== Honours ==
Ituano

- Campeonato Paulista: 2014

Corinthians

- Campeonato Brasileiro Série A: 2017
- Campeonato Paulista: 2018, 2019

Bahia

- Campeonato Baiano: 2020

Cuiabá

- Campeonato Mato-Grossense: 2021, 2024

Coritiba

- Campeonato Brasileiro Série B: 2025

Sport Recife

- Campeonato Pernambucano: 2026

=== Individual ===
- Campeonato Paulista Best Young Player: 2017
