= Matheus Matias =

Brazilian footballer

Personal information
- Full name: Matheus Matias Ferreira
- Date of birth: 26 June 1998 (age 28)
- Place of birth: Natal, Brazil
- Height: 1.87 m (6 ft 2 in)
- Position: Striker

Team information
- Current team: ASA

Youth career
- 2017: ABC

Senior career*
Years	Team	Apps	(Gls)
2017–2018	ABC	20	(12)
2018–2022	Corinthians	2	(0)
2019	→ Ceará (loan)	6	(2)
2019	→ Avaí (loan)	12	(3)
2020	→ Oeste (loan)	1	(0)
2020	→ São Bernardo (loan)	4	(0)
2020	→ Paraná (loan)	4	(0)
2022	→ Ponte Preta (loan)	0	(0)
2023	Gimhae FC	4	(0)
2023–	ASA	0	(0)
- * Club domestic league appearances and goals as of 22:18, 17 June 2019 (UTC)

Matheus Matias Ferreira (born 26 June 1998), known as Matheus Matias or simply Matheus, is a Brazilian footballer who plays for ASA as a striker.

== Club career ==
=== ABC ===
Born in Natal, Rio Grande do Norte, Matheus only played futsal and seven-a-side football before being approved on a trial at ABC in 2017. Initially assigned to the youth setup, he impressed during a friendly in September and was promoted to the first team by manager Itamar Schülle.

Matheus made his professional debut on 14 October 2017, coming on as a half-time substitute in a 1–0 Série B home win against Boa Esporte. His first goal came fourteen days later, as he scored the first in a 3–0 home defeat of Londrina.

Matheus finished the campaign with two goals in ten appearances, as his side suffered relegation. The following 24 January, he scored a hat-trick in a 7–0 away routing of Baraúnas for the Campeonato Potiguar championship.

=== Corinthians ===
On 21 February 2018, after scoring ten goals in ten matches, Matheus signed a five-year contract with Série A side Corinthians. He made his debut for the club on 9 June, replacing Roger late into a 0–0 home draw against Vitória for the Série A championship.

== Career statistics ==
As of 24 November 2019

Club	Season	League			State League		Cup		Continental		Other		Total	
Club	Season	Division	Apps	Goals	Apps	Goals	Apps	Goals	Apps	Goals	Apps	Goals	Apps	Goals
ABC	2017	Série B	10	2	—		—		—		—		10	2
ABC	2018	Série C	0	0	6	6	1	0	—		3 (Note: Appearance(s) in Copa do Nordeste)	4	10	10
ABC	Total		10	2	6	6	1	0	—		3	4	20	12
Corinthians	2018	Série A	2	0	0	0	—		—		—		2	0
Ceará (loan)	2019	Série A	0	0	3	2	0	0	—		2	0	5	2
Avaí (loan)	2019	Série A	2	0	—		—		—		—		2	0
Career total			14	2	9	8	1	0	0	0	6	5	29	15

== Honours ==
ABC

- Campeonato Potiguar: 2018

Corinthians

- Campeonato Paulista: 2018
