= Walter (footballer, born 1987) =

Brazilian footballer

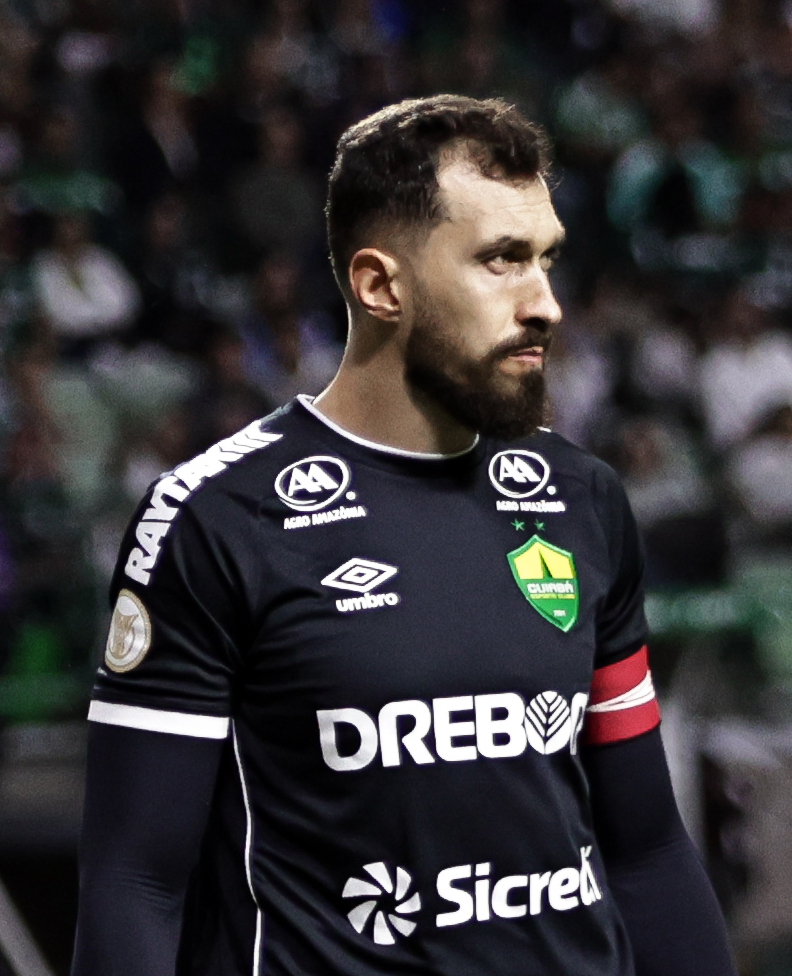
- Walter with Cuiabá in 2022

Personal information
- Full name: Walter Leandro Capeloza Artune
- Date of birth: 18 November 1987 (age 38)
- Place of birth: Jaú, Brazil
- Height: 1.88 m (6 ft 2 in)
- Position: Goalkeeper

Team information
- Current team: Mirassol
- Number: 22

Youth career
- XV de Jaú

Senior career*
Years	Team	Apps	(Gls)
2005	XV de Jaú		
2006–2010	Iraty	17	(0)
2007	→ Rio Branco-PR (loan)	20	(0)
2009	→ Londrina (loan)	10	(0)
2011	Corinthians Paranaense	21	(0)
2011	Caxias	2	(0)
2011	Novo Hamburgo	0	(0)
2012	XV de Jaú	19	(0)
2012	Noroeste	0	(0)
2013	União Barbarense	0	(0)
2013–2021	Corinthians	67	(0)
2021	→ Cuiabá (loan)	34	(0)
2022–2024	Cuiabá	99	(0)
2025–	Mirassol	47	(0)
- * Club domestic league appearances and goals as of 9 April 2026

Walter Leandro Capeloza Artune (born 18 November 1987), simply known as Walter, is a Brazilian professional footballer who plays as a goalkeeper for Mirassol.

== Career statistics ==
As of 26 February 2023.

Club	Season	National League			State League		Cup		Continental		Other		Total	
Club	Season	Division	Apps	Goals	Apps	Goals	Apps	Goals	Apps	Goals	Apps	Goals	Apps	Goals
Iraty	2006	Paranaense	—		0	0	3	0	—		—		3	0
Iraty	2008	Paranaense	—		0	0	—		—		—		0	0
Iraty	2009	Paranaense	—		3	0	—		—		—		3	0
Iraty	2010	Série D	6	0	8	0	—		—		—		14	0
Iraty	Total		6	0	11	0	3	0	—		—		20	0
Rio Branco-PR (loan)	2007	Paranaense	—		20	0	2	0	—		—		22	0
Londrina (loan)	2009	Série D	10	0	—		—		—		—		10	0
Corinthians Paranaense	2011	Paranaense	—		21	0	—		—		—		21	0
Caxias	2011	Série C	2	0	—		—		—		—		2	0
Novo Hamburgo	2011	Gaúcho	—		0	0	—		—		1 (Note: Appearance(s) in Copa FGF)	0	1	0
XV de Jaú	2012	Paulista Série A3	—		19	0	—		—		—		19	0
Noroeste	2012	Paulista Série A2	—		0	0	—		—		24 (Note: Appearance(s) in Copa Paulista)	0	24	0
União Barbarense	2013	Paulista	—		18	0	—		—		—		18	0
Corinthians	2013	Série A	8	0	—		1	0	—		—		9	0
Corinthians	2014	Série A	4	0	7	0	0	0	—		—		11	0
Corinthians	2015	Série A	4	0	5	0	0	0	0	0	—		9	0
Corinthians	2016	Série A	19	0	2	0	0	0	0	0	—		21	0
Corinthians	2017	Série A	1	0	0	0	0	0	0	0	—		1	0
Corinthians	2018	Série A	12	0	0	0	0	0	1 (Note: Appearance(s) in Copa Libertadores)	0	—		13	0
Corinthians	2019	Série A	6	0	1	0	2	0	0	0	—		9	0
Corinthians	2020	Série A	4	0	1	0	0	0	0	0	—		5	0
Corinthians	Total		52	0	15	0	3	0	1	0	0	0	71	0
Cuiabá (loan)	2021	Série A	34	0	10	0	2	0	—		0	0	46	0
Cuiabá (loan)	2022	Série A	28	0	12	0	4	0	3 (Note: Appearance(s) in Copa Sudamericana)	0	—		47	0
Cuiabá (loan)	2023	Série A	0	0	4	0	1	0	—		—		5	0
Cuiabá (loan)	Total		62	0	26	0	7	0	3	0	0	0	98	0
Career total			138	0	131	0	15	0	4	0	25	0	313	0

== Honours ==
Corinthians

- Campeonato Brasileiro Série A: 2015, 2017
- Campeonato Paulista: 2017, 2018, 2019

Cuiabá

- Campeonato Mato-Grossense: 2021, 2022, 2023, 2024
