= Pedro Henrique (footballer, born 1995) =

Brazilian footballer

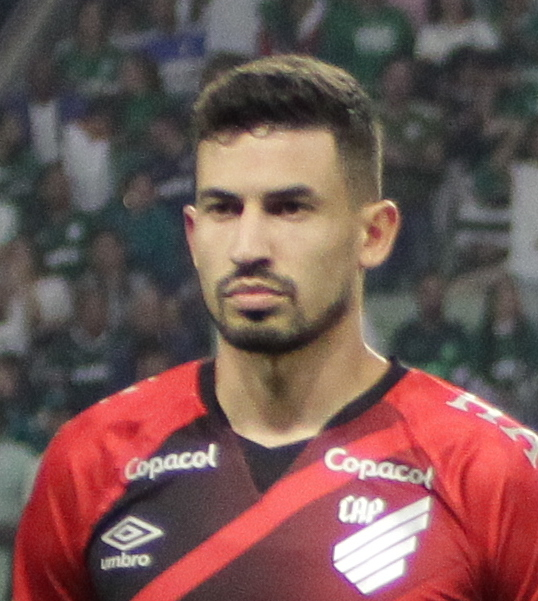

Personal information
- Full name: Pedro Henrique Ribeiro Gonçalves
- Date of birth: 2 October 1995 (age 31)
- Place of birth: Lauro Müller, Brazil
- Height: 1.88 m (6 ft 2 in)
- Position: Centre back

Team information
- Current team: Al-Ettifaq
- Number: 5

Youth career
- 2012–2015: Corinthians
- 2013: → Flamengo-SP (loan)

Senior career*
Years	Team	Apps	(Gls)
2015–2020	Corinthians	79	(3)
2015	→ Bragantino (loan)	4	(0)
2019	→ Athletico Paranaense (loan)	13	(0)
2020–2024	Athletico Paranaense	115	(2)
2024–2026	RB Bragantino	83	(3)
2026–	Al-Ettifaq	4	(0)
- * Club domestic league appearances and goals as of 30 October 2026

Pedro Henrique Ribeiro Gonçalves (born 2 October 1995), known as Pedro Henrique, is a Brazilian professional footballer who plays as a centre back for Al-Ettifaq.

== Career ==
=== Early life ===
Pedro began playing for Corinthians' academy in 2012. He was briefly loaned in 2013 for Flamengo-SP and played that year's Copa São Paulo de Futebol Júnior. During his tenure in Corinthians' youth squads, he won the 2014 and 2015 U20 Campeonato Paulista, 2014 U20 Campeonato Brasileiro and the 2015 Copa São Paulo de Futebol Júnior.

=== Corinthians ===
Pedro was elevated to the professional team in February 2014, but did not take part in any of the season matches, only participating in training sessions and as an unused substitute. In January 2015, he made his debut entering during the half time in a friendly against 1. FC Köln at the team's pre-season in Florida, United States. He was eventually loaned to Bragantino for the 2015 Campeonato Brasileiro Série B, playing four games with the club before returning to Corinthians. He was part of the squad that won the 2015 Campeonato Brasileiro Série A.

His official debut for Corinthians took place on 4 June 2016 as he started in a comeback 2–1 victory against Coritiba at Arena Corinthians.

=== Athletico Paranaense ===
On 21 July 2020, Pedro Henrique signed for Athletico Paranaense for a reported €1 million transfer fee. He signed a contract until the end of the 2024 season.

== Career statistics ==
As of 28 February 2023

Club	Season	League			State League		Cup		Continental		Other		Total	
Club	Season	Division	Apps	Goals	Apps	Goals	Apps	Goals	Apps	Goals	Apps	Goals	Apps	Goals
Corinthians	2015	Série A	0	0	—		—		—		—		0	0
Corinthians	2016	Série A	13	0	0	0	1	0	—		—		14	0
Corinthians	2017	Série A	22	1	5	1	1	0	2 (Note: Appearance(s) in Copa Sudamericana)	0	—		30	2
Corinthians	2018	Série A	12	0	9	1	2	0	2 (Note: Appearance(s) in Copa Libertadores)	0	—		25	1
Corinthians	2019	Série A	3	0	5	0	1	0	—		—		9	0
Corinthians	2020	Série A	0	0	10	0	0	0	2	0	—		12	0
Corinthians	Subtotal		50	1	29	2	5	0	6	0	—		90	3
Bragantino (loan)	2015	Série B	4	0	—		—		—		—		4	0
Athletico Paranaense (loan)	2019	Série A	11	0	—		—		2	0	1 (Note: Appearance(s) in J.League Cup / Copa Sudamericana Championship)	0	14	0
Athletico Paranaense	2020	Série A	30	0	0	0	1	0	5	1	—		36	1
Athletico Paranaense	2021	Série A	28	1	1	0	10	1	13	0	—		52	2
Athletico Paranaense	2022	Série A	28	0	5	0	5	0	12	0	2 (Note: Appearance(s) in Recopa Sudamericana)	0	52	0
Athletico Paranaense	2023	Série A	0	0	7	0	0	0	0	0	—		7	0
Athletico Paranaense	Subtotal		86	1	13	0	16	1	30	1	2	0	147	3
Career total			151	2	42	2	22	1	38	1	3	0	255	6

== Honours ==
Corinthians

- Campeonato Brasileiro Série A: 2015, 2017
- Campeonato Paulista: 2017, 2018, 2019

Athletico Paranaense

- J.League Cup / Copa Sudamericana Championship: 2019
- Copa Sudamericana: 2021
- Campeonato Paranaense: 2023
