= Vinicius Del'Amore =

Brazilian footballer

Personal information
- Full name: Vinicius García Del'Amore
- Date of birth: 5 January 1997 (age 29)
- Place of birth: São Bernardo do Campo, Brazil
- Height: 1.88 m (6 ft 2 in)
- Position: Defender

Team information
- Current team: Retrô

Youth career
- 2009–2012: Corinthians
- 2011–2015: Palmeiras
- 2016–2019: Corinthians

Senior career*
Years	Team	Apps	(Gls)
2017–2020	Corinthians	0	(0)
2017	→ Fortaleza (loan)	7	(0)
2018	→ Londrina (loan)	4	(0)
2019	→ Oeste (loan)	0	(0)
2020	Votuporanguense	0	(0)
2020	→ Anapolina (loan)	6	(0)
2021	Retrô	9	(0)
2022	Altos	4	(0)
- * Club domestic league appearances and goals as of 13 August 2022

Vinicius García Del'Amore (born 5 January 1997) is a Brazilian footballer who plays for Altos as a defender.

== Club career ==
Born in São Bernardo do Campo, Del'Amore joined the youth academy of Corinthians at the age of 11. Although, he later switched to Palmeiras, he returned to his former club after four years in 2015. In February 2017, he was promoted to the senior team and signed a contract till December 2019. Subsequently, he was loaned out to Fortaleza for the 2017 season. On 16 March, he made his debut for the club in a 3–2 victory against Tiradentes in Campeonato Cearense.

On 28 December 2017, Del'Amore joined Londrina, again on loan.

== Club statistics ==
As of match played on 25 March 2018

Club	Season	League			Cup		State League		Total	
Club	Season	Division	Apps	Goals	Apps	Goals	Apps	Goals	Apps	Goals
Fortaleza (loan)	2017	Série C	0	0	1	0	2	0	3	0
Londrina (loan)	2018	Série B	0	0	1	0	3	0	4	0
Career total			0	0	2	0	5	0	7	0
