= Luidy Viegas =

Brazilian footballer

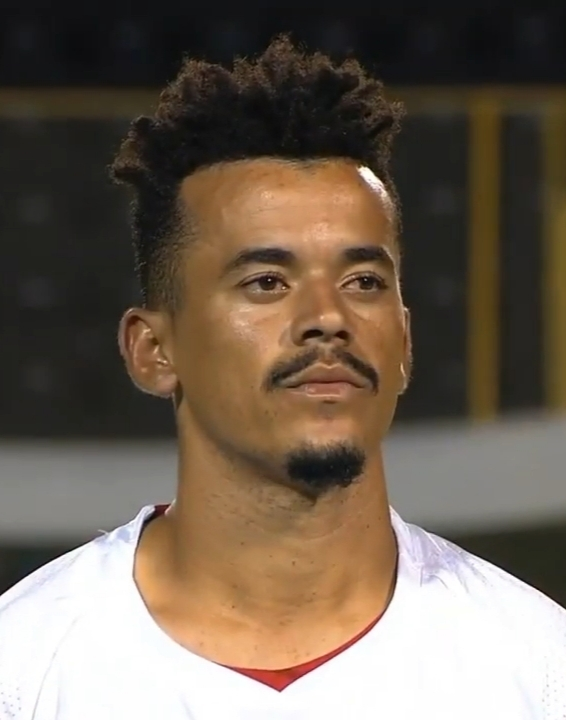
- Luidy Viegas

Personal information
- Date of birth: 21 July 1996 (age 30)
- Place of birth: União dos Palmares, Brazil
- Height: 1.67 m (5 ft 5 1/2 in)
- Position: Winger

Team information
- Current team: Operário-PR

Senior career*
Years	Team	Apps	(Gls)
2014	Caçador	9	(2)
2015	Murici	5	(1)
2016	CRB	55	(9)
2017–2020	Corinthians	0	(0)
2017	→ Figueirense (loan)	24	(3)
2018	→ Ceará (loan)	16	(1)
2018	→ São Bento (loan)	8	(0)
2019	→ Londrina (loan)	32	(3)
2020	→ CRB (loan)	49	(5)
2021	CRB	20	(0)
2021	Confiança	17	(1)
2022	Vitória	29	(3)
2023–	Operário-PR	30	(1)
- * Club domestic league appearances and goals as of 8 October 2023

Luidy Viegas (born 21 July 1996), also known as just Luidy, is a Brazilian footballer who plays as a winger for Operário-PR.

== Career ==
=== CRB ===
At the age of 20 years, Luidy Viegas made his debut for CRB in the derby against CSA the 6th round of the Campeonato Alagoano draw 1 to 1. During his second game he scored his first goal as a professional. He also scored a goal in the victory by 3–1 in the derby against ASA. In the next game, he secured another goal in the rout of the Seven September 4 to 1 since being highly praised by alagoana media. In the first leg of semifinal against Coruripe Luidy had his best performance with the CRB shirt until then, which made a goal and gave pass to the goal of Lúcio Maranhão in regatiana victory by 2 to 0. After winning the state title by the CRB he was elected the revelation of the competition. Made another important goal in the win over Ivinhema the first phase of the Copa do Brasil match in which the CRB won 2-0 and secured their qualification for the next phase.

In the first round of Série B, he scored the winning goal over Londrina by 1 to 0. In the third round, Viegas scored a goal that secured the draw against Oeste away from home for 1 to 1. He also scored during a fourth round competition, helping the CRB to win his second win, the first at home. His great start in Série B began to draw attention of many first division clubs like Santos.

Despite fluctuating at times, Luidy Viegas continued to perform well in Serie B and proved to be a key part of the good CRB campaign in the competition. On August 30, he stood out again against the West, scoring twice in the Galo's 3–1 victory over Estádio Rei Pelé for the 22nd round of the Série B.

He finished the season with nine goals scored and was traded with Corinthians for next season.

=== Corinthians ===
Luidy Viegas was introduced to Corinthians in January 2017, joining the cast that traveled to the United States for the Florida Cup. Although he was hired as a promise, he had no chance to debut for his new club before being loaned to Figueirense in early April.

=== Figueirense (loan) ===
On April 19, Corinthians loaned player Luidy Viegas to Figueirense until the end of 2017, where he will play for Serie B. On July 11, he met up with the club that revealed him, the CRB, in a match valid for the 13th round of the 2017 Campeonato Brasileiro Série B, in which the Alagoan club won the Figueirense by 2x1 at the Estádio Rei Pelé in Maceió. With this bad result the Santa Catarina club remained in the relegation zone. At the end of the competition, the club managed to escape from the relegation. Luidy scored 3 goals in 24 games.

== Honours ==
CRB

- Campeonato Alagoano: 2016
