= Rodrigo Figueiredo =

Brazilian footballer

Personal information
- Full name: Rodrigo Figueiredo de Carvalho
- Date of birth: 27 March 1996 (age 30)
- Place of birth: São Paulo, Brazil
- Height: 1.79 m (5 ft 10 1/2 in)
- Position: Midfielder

Youth career
- –2013: Red Bull Brasil
- 2013–2016: Corinthians

Senior career*
Years	Team	Apps	(Gls)
2016–2019	Corinthians	3	(0)
2018	→ Londrina (loan)	0	(0)
2019	→ Joinville (loan)	0	(0)
2021	Levadiakos	1	(0)
2022	Pouso Alegre	0	(0)
2022	Guarany	1	(0)
2022–2023	Singida United		
2023–2024	Al Rams		
- * Club domestic league appearances and goals as of 21 April 2021

Rodrigo Figueiredo de Carvalho (born 27 March 1996) is a Brazilian professional footballer who plays as a midfielder.

== Club career ==
Born in São Paulo, Figueiredo started his youth career with the academy of Red Bull Brasil, and joined the Corinthians academy in 2013. While at the junior team, he won the Copa São Paulo de Futebol Júnior and the Campeonato Paulista under-20.

Figueiredo was promoted to the senior squad at the end of 2016. On 5 June 2017, he signed a contract extension which would keep him at the club at till December 2019.

On 19 November 2017, Figueiredo made his senior professional debut for the club in a 3–0 defeat against Flamengo.
