= Paulo Roberto (footballer, born 1987) =

Brazilian footballer

Personal information
- Full name: Paulo Roberto da Silva
- Date of birth: 6 March 1987 (age 39)
- Place of birth: Lavras, Brazil
- Height: 1.76 m (5 ft 9 in)
- Position: Midfielder

Team information
- Current team: Paysandu

Youth career
- 2006–2007: Juventus

Senior career*
Years	Team	Apps	(Gls)
2007	Juventus	0	(0)
2008	Brasil de Farroupilha	0	(0)
2009–2017	Osasco Audax	0	(0)
2010	→ Guarani (loan)	34	(2)
2011	→ Atlético Paranaense (loan)	1	(0)
2013	→ Ponte Preta (loan)	3	(0)
2013–2015	→ Figueirense (loan)	63	(1)
2016	→ Bahia (loan)	6	(0)
2016	→ Sport Recife (loan)	14	(0)
2017	→ Corinthians (loan)	8	(0)
2017–2019	Corinthians	6	(0)
2019	→ Fortaleza (loan)	4	(0)
2020	Mirassol	0	(0)
2021	Santo André	0	(0)
2021–	Paysandu	0	(0)
- * Club domestic league appearances and goals as of 5 January 2017

Paulo Roberto da Silva (born 6 March 1987), known as Paulo Roberto, is a Brazilian professional footballer who plays as a midfielder for Paysandu.

== Career ==
Born in Lavras, Minas Gerais, Paulo Roberto made his senior debuts with Juventus in 2007, aged 20. In 2009, after a short stint at Brasil de Farroupilha, he joined Grêmio Osasco Audax.

In April 2010, Paulo Roberto was loaned to Série A club Guarani, until December. He made his debut in the category on 9 May, starting in a 1–0 home win against Goiás.

On 15 September 2010 Paulo Roberto scored his first goal in the main category of Brazilian football, netting his team's second in a 2–4 away loss against Cruzeiro. He finished the season with 34 appearances and two goals, as his side suffered relegation.

In May 2011 Paulo Roberto moved to Atlético Paranaense, also on loan. After appearing in only one match he returned to Audax, winning promotion from Campeonato Paulista Série A2.

On 28 April 2013 Paulo Roberto joined Ponte Preta in a permanent deal. On 27 September, after failing to impress at Macaca, he was loaned to Figueirense.

In December 2013, after Figueira's promotion to the top level, Paulo Ricardo signed permanently for the club.

== Honours ==
Figueirense

- Campeonato Catarinense: 2014, 2015

Corinthians

- Campeonato Brasileiro Série A: 2017
- Campeonato Paulista: 2017, 2018

Fortaleza

- Campeonato Cearense: 2019
- Copa do Nordeste: 2019
