= 2024 SE Palmeiras season =

Palmeiras
2024 season
- President: Leila Pereira
- Coach: Abel Ferreira
- Stadium: Allianz Parque
- Série A: 2nd
- Campeonato Paulista: Winners
- Copa Libertadores: Round of 16
- Copa do Brasil: Round of 16
- Supercopa do Brasil: Runners-up
- Top goalscorer: League: Estêvão (13 goals); All: José Manuel López (22 goals)
- Highest home attendance: 41,446 (vs. Santos – 7 April 2024)
- Lowest home attendance: 8,879 (vs. Ituano – 8 February 2024)
- Average home league attendance: 31,455
Home colors	Away colors	Third colors
- All statistics correct as of 8 December 2024.

The 2024 season was the 110th in Sociedade Esportiva Palmeiras' existence. This season Palmeiras participated in the Campeonato Paulista, Supercopa do Brasil, Copa Libertadores, Copa do Brasil and Série A.

== Squad information ==
Note: Flags indicate national team as defined under FIFA eligibility rules; some limited exceptions apply. Players may hold more than one non-FIFA nationality.

No.	Pos.	Nation	Player
1	GK	BRA	Mateus
2	DF	BRA	Marcos Rocha
4	DF	ARG	Agustín Giay
5	MF	ARG	Aníbal Moreno
6	DF	BRA	Vanderlan
7	FW	BRA	Dudu
8	MF	BRA	Zé Rafael
9	MF	BRA	Felipe Anderson
10	FW	BRA	Rony
11	FW	BRA	Bruno Rodrigues
12	DF	BRA	Mayke
14	GK	BRA	Marcelo Lomba
15	DF	PAR	Gustavo Gómez (captain)
16	DF	BRA	Caio Paulista
17	FW	BRA	Lázaro

No.	Pos.	Nation	Player
18	MF	BRA	Maurício
20	MF	BRA	Rômulo
21	GK	BRA	Weverton (vice-captain)
22	DF	URU	Joaquín Piquerez
23	MF	BRA	Raphael Veiga
25	MF	BRA	Gabriel Menino
26	DF	BRA	Murilo
27	MF	COL	Richard Ríos
33	DF	BRA	Michel
34	DF	BRA	Naves
35	MF	BRA	Fabinho
41	MF	BRA	Estêvão
42	FW	ARG	José Manuel López
44	DF	BRA	Vitor Reis

=== Transfers ===
==== Transfers in ====
Pos.	Player	Transferred from	Fee/notes	Date	Source
MF	(Argentina) Aníbal Moreno	(Argentina) Racing	Sign	15 November 2023	
FW	(Brazil) Bruno Rodrigues	(Brazil) Cruzeiro	Sign	19 December 2023	
DF	(Brazil) Caio Paulista	(Brazil) Fluminense	R$18,300,000	5 January 2024	
MF	(Brazil) Estêvão	Youth system	Promoted to the first team	20 January 2024	
FW	(Brazil) Lázaro	(Spain) Almería	Loan	7 February 2024	
MF	(Brazil) Rômulo	(Brazil) Novorizontino	Sign	20 February 2024. Will join the team after the Campeonato Paulista.	
MF	(Brazil) Felipe Anderson	(Italy) Lazio	Sign	15 April 2024. Will join the team in July 2024.	
DF	(Brazil) Vitor Reis	Youth system	Promoted to the first team	26 June 2024	
MF	(Brazil) Maurício	(Brazil) Internacional	R$62,100,000	27 June 2024	
DF	(Argentina) Agustín Giay	(Argentina) San Lorenzo	R$40,700,000	28 June 2024	

==== Transfers out ====
Pos.	Player	Transferred to	Fee/notes	Date	Source
MF	(Brazil) Jailson	(Spain) Celta	End of contract	15 December 2023	
DF	(Brazil) Jorge	(Brazil) Santos	Loan	27 December 2023	
FW	(Brazil) Artur	(Russia) Zenit	€15,000,000	8 January 2024	
FW	(Brazil) Kevin	(Ukraine) Shakhtar Donetsk	€12,000,000	19 January 2024	
MF	(Colombia) Eduard Atuesta	(United States) Los Angeles FC	Loan	8 February 2024	
FW	(Brazil) Breno Lopes	(Brazil) Fortaleza	Loan	18 April 2024	
FW	(Brazil) Endrick	(Spain) Real Madrid	€72,000,000	Deal officially signed on 15 December 2022. Will join the team on 21 July 2024.	
MF	(Brazil) Luis Guilherme	(England) West Ham	€23,000,000	14 June 2024	
DF	(Brazil) Luan	(Mexico) Toluca	US$3,500,000	21 June 2024	
MF	(Brazil) Jhon Jhon	(Brazil) Red Bull Bragantino	≈US$4,500,000	15 July 2024	
DF	(Brazil) Gustavo Garcia	(Portugal) Nacional	Loan	15 July 2024	

== Competitions ==
=== Overview ===
Competition	First match	Last match	Starting round	Final position	Record							
Competition	First match	Last match	Starting round	Final position	Pld	W	D	L	GF	GA	GD	Win %
Série A	14 April 2024	8 December 2024	Matchday 1	2nd	38	22	7	9	60	33	+27	57.89
Copa do Brasil	2 May 2024	7 August 2024	Third round	Round of 16	4	2	1	1	3	3	+0	50.00
Campeonato Paulista	21 January 2024	7 April 2024	Matchday 1	Winners	16	11	4	1	28	11	+17	68.75
Copa Libertadores	3 April 2024	21 August 2024	Group stage	Round of 16	8	4	3	1	17	9	+8	50.00
Supercopa do Brasil	4 February 2024		Final	Runners-up	1	0	1	0	0	0	+0	0.00
Total					67	39	16	12	108	56	+52	58.21

Source: Competitions

=== Campeonato Paulista ===
Palmeiras was drawn into Group B. The Federação Paulista de Futebol released a "basic" schedule on 7 December 2023. And on 26 December 2023 the full schedule was released.

==== First stage ====
Pos	Team	Pld	W	D	L	GF	GA	GD	Pts	Qualification
1	Palmeiras	12	8	4	0	20	9	+11	28	Knockout stage
2	Ponte Preta	12	4	5	3	15	11	+4	17	Knockout stage
3	Água Santa	12	4	3	5	8	11	−3	15	
4	Guarani	12	2	4	6	10	14	−4	10	

Source: Soccerway

21 January 2024 1	Novorizontino	1–1	Palmeiras	Novo Horizonte
16:00 UTC−3	Danilo Barcelos (yellow card) 35'; Jenison (yellow card) 90+2'; Willian Farias 90+6'	Report	Raphael Veiga 62'	Stadium: Doutor Jorge Ismael de Biasi; Attendance: 10,569; Referee: Matheus Delgado Candançan

24 January 2024 2	Palmeiras	3–2	Inter de Limeira	São Paulo
21:35 UTC−3	Raphael Veiga 20' (pen.), 42'; Luis Guilherme (yellow card) 45+4'; Rony 88'	Report	Juninho 4', 67' (pen.), (yellow card) 27'; Maurício (yellow card) 45+2' (yellow-red card) 90+2'; Zé Mário (yellow card) 58'; Diego Jussani (yellow card) 62'	Stadium: Allianz Parque; Attendance: 27,228; Referee: João Vitor Gobi

28 January 2024 3	Palmeiras	2–1	Santos	São Paulo
18:00 UTC−3	Raphael Veiga 49'; López 62'	Report	Rincón (yellow card) 31'; Otero 69'	Stadium: Allianz Parque; Attendance: 40,379; Referee: Raphael Claus

31 January 2024 4	Red Bull Bragantino	0–1	Palmeiras	Bragança Paulista
19:30 UTC−3	Juninho Capixaba (yellow card) 83'	Report	Fabinho (yellow card) 29'; Gabriel Menino (yellow card) 82'; López 89'; Gustavo Garcia (yellow card) 90+3'	Stadium: Nabi Abi Chedid; Attendance: 6,589; Referee: Matheus Delgado Candançan

8 February 2024 6	Palmeiras	2–0	Ituano	Barueri
21:00 UTC−3	López 37'; Rony 86'	Report	José Aldo (yellow card) 17'; Léo Oliveira (yellow card) 22'	Stadium: Arena Barueri; Attendance: 8,879; Referee: Vinicius Gonçalves Dias Araújo
Note: Originally this match would be played at Allianz Parque, however, due to poor conditions on the pitch, the match was moved to Arena Barueri in Barueri.

12 February 2024 7	Santo André	1–1	Palmeiras	Santo André
19:00 UTC−3	Walce (yellow card) 52'; Afonso (yellow card) 81'; Lohan 89'	Report	López 47'; Zé Rafael (yellow card) 64'	Stadium: Bruno José Daniel; Attendance: 10,659; Referee: Lucas Canetto Bellote

15 February 2024 8	São Bernardo	0–1	Palmeiras	São Bernardo do Campo
19:30 UTC−3	Lucas Lima (yellow card) 24'; Pedro Carrerete (yellow card) 53'; Hélder (yellow card) 62'; Wesley Dias (yellow card) 69'; Rafael Forster (yellow card) 79'	Report	Vanderlan (yellow card) 71'; López 87'; Jhon Jhon (yellow card) 90+2'	Stadium: Primeiro de Maio; Attendance: 6,176; Referee: Luiz Flávio de Oliveira

18 February 2024 9	Palmeiras	2–2	Corinthians	Barueri
18:00 UTC−3	Gómez (yellow card) 11'; Endrick (yellow card) 25', (goal) 44'; López 68', (yellow card) 69'	Report	Romero (yellow card) 5'; Gustavo Henrique (yellow card) 43'; Yuri Alberto 87'; Cássio (red card) 90'; Garro 90+10'	Stadium: Arena Barueri; Attendance: 29,647; Referee: Raphael Claus
Note: Originally this match would be played at Allianz Parque, however, due to poor conditions on the pitch, the match was moved to Arena Barueri in Barueri.

24 February 2024 10	Palmeiras	3–1	Mirassol	Barueri
18:00 UTC−3	Moreno 25', (yellow card) 69'; Endrick (yellow card) 52'; Raphael Veiga 60' (pen.); Luan (yellow card) 89'; Breno Lopes 90'	Report	Rodrigo Ferreira 15'	Stadium: Arena Barueri; Attendance: 11,774; Referee: Edina Alves Batista
Note: Originally this match would be played at Allianz Parque, however, due to poor conditions on the pitch, the match was moved to Arena Barueri in Barueri.

28 February 2024 5	Portuguesa	0–2	Palmeiras	São Paulo
19:30 UTC−3	Gustavo Talles (yellow card) 21'; Everton Maceió (yellow card) 35'; Victor Andrade (red card) 61'; Eduardo Diniz (yellow card) 68'; Patrick (yellow card) 69'	Report	López 67'; Gabriel Menino 90+3'	Stadium: Canindé; Attendance: 11,652; Referee: Thiago Luis Scarascati
Note: Match postponed from the original date due to Palmeiras participation in the 2024 Supercopa do Brasil.

3 March 2024 11	São Paulo	1–1	Palmeiras	São Paulo
20:00 UTC−3	Alisson 25'; Pablo Maia (yellow card) 34'; Rafael (yellow card) 56'	Report	Raphael Veiga (yellow card) 15', (goal) 58' (pen.); Ríos (yellow card) 27'; Zé Rafael (yellow card) 75'; Gabriel Menino (yellow card) 82'	Stadium: Morumbi; Attendance: 55,030; Referee: Matheus Delgado Candançan

9 March 2024 12	Palmeiras	1–0	Botafogo	Barueri
18:00 UTC−3	Lázaro (yellow card) 15'; Moreno (yellow card) 56'; Rony 68'	Report	Jean (yellow card) 13'; Matheus Costa (red card) 37'; Fillipe Soutto (yellow card) 53'	Stadium: Arena Barueri; Attendance: 11,598; Referee: João Vitor Gobi
Note: Originally this match would be played at Allianz Parque, however, due to poor conditions on the pitch, the match was moved to Arena Barueri in Barueri.

==== Quarter-final ====
16 March 2024	Palmeiras	5–1	Ponte Preta	Barueri
18:00 UTC−3	López 3', 19', 70'; Murilo 38'; Raphael Veiga (yellow card) 47'; Piquerez 66'; Luan (yellow card) 75'; Gabriel Menino (yellow card) 88'; Estêvão (yellow card) 90+3'	Report	Iago Dias (yellow card) 22'; Mateus Silva (yellow card) 25'; Ramon (yellow card) 45+2'; Igor Inocêncio (yellow card) 53'; Renato 90'	Stadium: Arena Barueri; Attendance: 18,119; Referee: Luiz Flávio de Oliveira

==== Semi-final ====
28 March 2024	Palmeiras	1–0	Novorizontino	São Paulo
21:35 UTC−3	Endrick 53'; Ríos (yellow card) 90+5'	Report	Luisão (yellow card) 35'; Fabrício Daniel (yellow card) 90+6'	Stadium: Allianz Parque; Attendance: 40,448; Referee: Edina Alves Batista

==== Finals ====
31 March 2024 First leg	Santos	1–0	Palmeiras	Santos
18:00 UTC−3	Otero 48'; João Schmidt (yellow card) 52'; Morelos (yellow card) 90+1'; Aderlan (yellow card) 90+4'	Report	Zé Rafael (yellow card) 65'; Estêvão (yellow card) 90+2'	Stadium: Vila Belmiro; Attendance: 15,946; Referee: Flávio Rodrigues de Souza

7 April 2024 Second leg	Palmeiras	2–0 (2–1 agg.)	Santos	São Paulo
18:00 UTC−3	Endrick (yellow card) 21'; Raphael Veiga 33' (pen.); Zé Rafael (yellow card) 41'; Moreno 67'; Mayke (yellow card) 90+2'	Report	Aderlan (yellow card) 58'; Gil (yellow card) 60'; Morelos (yellow card) 61'	Stadium: Allianz Parque; Attendance: 41,446; Referee: Raphael Claus

=== Copa Libertadores ===
==== Group stage ====
The draw for the group stage was held on 18 March 2024. The full schedule was announced on 19 March 2024.

Pos	Team	Pld	W	D	L	GF	GA	GD	Pts	Qualification
1	(Brazil) Palmeiras	6	4	2	0	14	5	+9	14	Advance to round of 16
2	(Argentina) San Lorenzo	6	2	2	2	6	6	0	8	Advance to round of 16
3	(Ecuador) Independiente del Valle	6	2	1	3	8	9	−1	7	Transfer to Copa Sudamericana
4	(Uruguay) Liverpool	6	1	1	4	6	14	−8	4	

Source: CONMEBOL
Rules for classification: 1) Points; 2) Goal difference; 3) Goals scored; 4) Away goals scored; 5) CONMEBOL ranking.

3 April 2024 1	San Lorenzo (Argentina)	1–1	(Brazil) Palmeiras	Buenos Aires, Argentina
21:30 UTC−3	Romaña 20', (yellow card) 86'; Barrios (yellow card) 33'; Ferreira (yellow card) 56'; Bareiro (yellow card) 58'; Giay (yellow card) 80'; Perruzzi (yellow card) 90+1'	Report	Vanderlan (yellow card) 51'; Breno Lopes (yellow card) 57'; Naves (yellow card) 64'; Piquerez 81'; Ríos (yellow card) 90+2'	Stadium: Estadio Pedro Bidegain; Attendance: 20,007; Referee: Jesús Valenzuela (Venezuela)

11 April 2024 2	Palmeiras (Brazil)	3–1	(Uruguay) Liverpool	São Paulo, Brazil
21:00 UTC−3	López (yellow card) 21', (goal) 58'; Moreno (yellow card) 31', (goal) 45+5'; Estêvão 66'	Report	Rosso 3'; Samudio (yellow card) 14'; García (yellow card) 45'; Cayetano (yellow card) 45+1'; Ocampo (yellow card) 45+6'; I. Rodríguez (yellow card) 72'	Stadium: Allianz Parque; Attendance: 28,365; Referee: Ángel Arteaga (Venezuela)

24 April 2024 3	Independiente del Valle (Ecuador)	2–3	(Brazil) Palmeiras	Quito, Ecuador
21:30 UTC−3	Páez 12'; Hoyos (yellow card) 16', (goal) 38'; Ortiz (yellow card) 74'; Caicedo (yellow card) 76'	Report	Endrick 45+2'; Vanderlan (yellow card) 80'; Lázaro 81'; Ríos (yellow card) 90+1'; Luis Guilherme 90+5'	Stadium: Estadio Banco Guayaquil; Attendance: 6,552; Referee: Cristian Garay (Chile)

9 May 2024 4	Liverpool (Uruguay)	0–5	(Brazil) Palmeiras	Montevideo, Uruguay
19:00 UTC−3	González (yellow card) 89'	Report	Raphael Veiga 44', 71'; Gabriel Menino (yellow card) 49'; Endrick 82', (yellow card) 85'; Rony 90+1'; Gómez 90+6' (pen.)	Stadium: Estadio Centenario; Attendance: 1,848; Referee: Andrés Rojas (Colombia)
Note: Liverpool play their home matches at Estadio Centenario, Montevideo instead of their regular stadium Estadio Belvedere, Montevideo which did not meet CONMEBOL requirements

15 May 2024 5	Palmeiras (Brazil)	2–1	(Ecuador) Independiente del Valle	São Paulo, Brazil
21:30 UTC−3	Ríos 36'; Gómez 45+3' (pen.)	Report	Caicedo (yellow card) 30'; Landázuri (yellow card) 44'; Díaz 64'	Stadium: Allianz Parque; Attendance: 31,672; Referee: Alexis Herrera (Venezuela)

30 May 2024 6	Palmeiras (Brazil)	0–0	(Argentina) San Lorenzo	São Paulo, Brazil
19:00 UTC−3	Ríos (yellow card) 65'	Report	Cuello (yellow card) 16'; Romaña (yellow card) 76'; Braida (yellow card) 90'	Stadium: Allianz Parque; Attendance: 40,113; Referee: Felipe González (Chile)

==== Round of 16 ====
The draw for the round of 16 was held on 3 June 2024.

14 August 2024 First leg	Botafogo (Brazil)	2–1	(Brazil) Palmeiras	Rio de Janeiro, Brazil
21:30 UTC−3	Luiz Henrique 22'; Igor Jesus 39', (yellow card) 49'; Cuiabano (yellow card) 64'; Tiquinho Soares (yellow card) 90'	Report	López (yellow card) 29'; Maurício 33'; Raphael Veiga (yellow card) 37'; Estêvão (yellow card) 90'	Stadium: Nilton Santos; Attendance: 38,848; Referee: Esteban Ostojich (Uruguay)

21 August 2024 Second leg	Palmeiras (Brazil)	2–2 (3–4 agg.)	(Brazil) Botafogo	São Paulo, Brazil
21:30 UTC−3	Ríos (yellow card) 35'; López 86'; Rony 90'	Report	Barboza (yellow card) 35'; Gregore (yellow card) 45+3'; Igor Jesus 56'; Savarino 64'; John (yellow card) 81'; Ponte (yellow card) 89'; Tchê Tchê (yellow card) 90+10'	Stadium: Allianz Parque; Attendance: 40,269; Referee: Facundo Tello (Argentina)

=== Série A ===
==== Standings ====
Pos	Team	Pld	W	D	L	GF	GA	GD	Pts	Qualification or relegation
1	Botafogo (C)	38	23	10	5	59	29	+30	79	Qualification for Copa Libertadores group stage (Note: Botafogo and Flamengo qualified for the Copa Libertadores group stage by winning the 2024 Copa Libertadores and the 2024 Copa do Brasil, respectively.)
2	Palmeiras	38	22	7	9	60	33	+27	73	Qualification for Copa Libertadores group stage
3	Flamengo	38	20	10	8	61	42	+19	70	Qualification for Copa Libertadores group stage
4	Fortaleza	38	19	11	8	53	39	+14	68	Qualification for Copa Libertadores group stage
5	Internacional	38	18	11	9	53	36	+17	65	Qualification for Copa Libertadores group stage

Source: CBF
Rules for classification: 1) points; 2) wins; 3) goal difference; 4) goals scored; 5) head-to-head results (only between two teams); 6) fewest red cards; 7) fewest yellow cards; 8) drawing of lots.
(C) Champions

==== Results by round ====
Round	1	2	3	4	5	6	7	8	9	10	11	12	13	14	15	16	17	18	19	20	21	22	23	24	25	26	27	28	29	30	31	32	33	34	35	36	37	38
Ground	A	H	H	A	A	H	A	H	A	H	H	A	H	A	H	H	A	H	A	H	A	A	H	H	A	H	A	H	A	A	H	A	H	A	A	H	A	H
Result	W	L	D	D	W	L	W	W	W	W	W	L	W	D	W	W	L	W	L	L	D	D	W	W	W	W	W	W	D	W	D	L	W	W	W	L	W	L
Position	7	12	11	12	6	9	7	6	5	3	2	4	2	3	3	2	2	2	3	3	4	4	3	3	3	2	2	2	2	2	2	2	2	2	1	2	2	2
Points	3	3	4	5	8	8	11	14	17	20	23	23	26	27	30	33	33	36	36	36	37	38	41	44	47	50	53	56	57	60	61	61	64	67	70	70	73	73

Source: Soccerway
A = Away; H = Home; W = Win; D = Draw; L = Loss; P = Postponed

==== Matches ====
The full schedule was announced on 29 February 2024.

14 April 2024 1	Vitória	0–1	Palmeiras	Salvador
18:30 UTC−3	Alerrandro (yellow card) 15'; Lucas Esteves (yellow card) 45+1'; Camutanga (yellow card) 53'	Report	Ríos (yellow card) 17', (goal) 20'; Endrick (yellow card) 45+1'; Gabriel Menino (yellow card) 57'; Mayke (yellow card) 85'; López (yellow card) 90+3'	Stadium: Barradão; Attendance: 30,644; Referee: Bráulio da Silva Machado (Santa Catarina)

17 April 2024 2	Palmeiras	0–1	Internacional	Barueri
20:00 UTC−3	López (yellow card) 58'; Moreno (yellow card) 59'	Report	Borré (yellow card) 43'; Wesley 45', (yellow card) 66'; Mercado (yellow card) 53'; Renê (yellow card) 81'	Stadium: Arena Barueri; Attendance: 13,464; Referee: Lucas Paulo Torezin (Paraná)
Note: Match moved to the Arena Barueri due to the a concert scheduled for the same date in the Allianz Parque.

21 April 2024 3	Palmeiras	0–0	Flamengo	São Paulo
16:00 UTC−3	Mayke (yellow card) 21'; Murilo (yellow card) 42'; Weverton (yellow card) 45+3'; Gómez (yellow card) 69'; Rony (yellow card) 84'	Report	Allan (yellow card) 15'; Léo Pereira (yellow card) 35'; Bruno Henrique (yellow card) 45+3'; Pulgar (yellow card) 70'	Stadium: Allianz Parque; Attendance: 29,956; Referee: Rodrigo José Pereira de Lima (Pernambuco)

29 April 2024 4	São Paulo	0–0	Palmeiras	São Paulo
20:00 UTC−3	Diego Costa (yellow card) 29'; Igor Vinícius (yellow card) 43'; Calleri (yellow card) 59'; Araújo (yellow card) 69'	Report	Gómez (yellow card) 40'; Endrick (yellow card) 45'; Murilo (yellow card) 59'	Stadium: Morumbi; Attendance: 55,694; Referee: Wilton Pereira Sampaio (Goiás)

5 May 2024 5	Cuiabá	0–2	Palmeiras	Cuiabá
18:30 UTC−3	Derik Lacerda (yellow card) 43'; Matheus Alexandre (yellow card) 90+7'	Report	Lázaro 45+1'; Murilo (yellow card) 50'; Estêvão 71' (pen.); Gabriel Menino (yellow card) 75'; Zé Rafael (yellow card) 90+4'	Stadium: Arena Pantanal; Attendance: 10,493; Referee: Bruno Arleu de Araújo (Rio de Janeiro)

12 May 2024 6	Palmeiras	0–2	Athletico Paranaense	Barueri
16:00 UTC−3	Mayke (yellow card) 34'; Endrick (yellow card) 45+8'; López (yellow card) 66'; Raphael Veiga (yellow card) 80'	Report	Pablo (yellow card) 26', (goal) 45+9'; Esquivel (yellow card) 45+8' (yellow-red card) 67'; Godoy (yellow card) 46'; Gamarra (yellow card) 56'; Gómez 59' (o.g.); Fernandinho (yellow card) 80'	Stadium: Arena Barueri; Attendance: 12,108; Referee: Bráulio da Silva Machado (Santa Catarina)
Note: Match moved to the Arena Barueri due to the a concert scheduled for the same date in the Allianz Parque.

2 June 2024 7	Criciúma	1–2	Palmeiras	Criciúma
16:00 UTC−3	Matheusinho (yellow card) 19', (goal) 69'; Barreto (yellow card) 33'; Higor Meritão (yellow card) 62'; Rodrigo (yellow card) 64'; Gustavo (yellow card) 88'; Ronald (yellow card) 90+4'; Allano (yellow card) 90+6'	Report	Gómez 67' (pen.), (yellow card) 90+6'; Lázaro 90+2'; Zé Rafael (yellow card) 90+4'; Caio Paulista (yellow card) 90+4'	Stadium: Helibelto Hülse; Attendance: 19,027; Referee: Rafael Rodrigo Klein (Rio Grande do Sul)
Note: Originally to be played on 19 May 2024, this match was postponed and rescheduled due to the 2024 Rio Grande do Sul floods.

13 June 2024 8	Palmeiras	2–0	Vasco	São Paulo
21:30 UTC−3	Piquerez 26'; Rony 56', (yellow card) 72'	Report	Sforza (yellow card) 51'; Victor Luis (yellow card) 90+3'	Stadium: Allianz Parque; Attendance: 37,641; Referee: Ramon Abatti Abel (Santa Catarina)
Note: Originally to be played on 26 May 2024, this match was postponed and rescheduled due to the 2024 Rio Grande do Sul floods.

17 June 2024 9	Atlético Mineiro	0–4	Palmeiras	Belo Horizonte
20:30 UTC−3	Igor Rabello (yellow card) 22'; Hulk (yellow card) 31' (yellow-red card) 31'; Gustavo Scarpa (yellow card) 36'; Zaracho (yellow card) 73'; Paulinho (red card) 90+7'	Report	Moreno 25', (yellow card) 51'; Piquerez (yellow card) 45+2', (goal) 60' (pen.); Estêvão 61', (yellow card) 61'; López 90+5'	Stadium: Arena MRV; Attendance: 31,448; Referee: Rodrigo José Pereira de Lima (Pernambuco)
Note: Originally to be played on 2 June 2024, this match was rescheduled due to the 2024 Rio Grande do Sul floods.

20 June 2024 10	Palmeiras	2–1	Red Bull Bragantino	São Paulo
21:30 UTC−3	Raphael Veiga 21'; Rony 55'	Report	Eric Ramires (yellow card) 37'; Matheus Fernandes 49'; Vitinho (yellow card) 70'	Stadium: Allianz Parque; Attendance: 29,119; Referee: Anderson Daronco (Rio Grande do Sul)

23 June 2024 11	Palmeiras	3–1	Juventude	São Paulo
18:30 UTC−3	López 49', (yellow card) 57'; Estêvão 75'; Mayke 83'; Piquerez (yellow card) 86'	Report	Gabriel (yellow card) 45+2'; Erick Farias 64'; Jadson (yellow card) 87'; Zé Marcos (yellow card) 87'	Stadium: Allianz Parque; Attendance: 38,258; Referee: Davi de Oliveira Lacerda (Espírito Santo)

26 June 2024 12	Fortaleza	3–0	Palmeiras	Fortaleza
21:30 UTC−3	Lucero 9', 48'; Pedro Augusto (yellow card) 12'; Brítez (yellow card) 66'; Bruno Pacheco 69'	Report	Rony (yellow card) 46'; Moreno (yellow card) 57'	Stadium: Arena Castelão; Attendance: 28,631; Referee: Alex Gomes Stefano (Rio de Janeiro)

1 July 2024 13	Palmeiras	2–0	Corinthians	São Paulo
20:00 UTC−3	Fabinho (yellow card) 36', (goal) 53'; Zé Rafael (yellow card) 43'; Raphael Veiga (red card) 63'; Vitor Reis 57'; Gabriel Menino (yellow card) 70'	Report	Raniele (yellow card) 33'; Garro (yellow card) 63'; Breno Bidon (yellow card) 86'; Gustavo Henrique (yellow card) 90+3'	Stadium: Allianz Parque; Attendance: 41,175; Referee: Anderson Daronco (Rio Grande do Sul)

4 July 2024 14	Grêmio	2–2	Palmeiras	Caxias do Sul
19:00 UTC−3	Pavón 2'; Cristaldo 70' (pen.); Rodrigo Ely (yellow card) 71'; Natã (yellow card) 82'	Report	Vitor Reis (yellow card) 37'; Naves (yellow card) 41'; Moreno (yellow card) 54'; López 74'; Estêvão 77'	Stadium: Centenário; Attendance: 15,597; Referee: Marcelo de Lima Henrique (Ceará)

7 July 2024 15	Palmeiras	2–0	Bahia	São Paulo
18:30 UTC−3	Estêvão 45+3'; Rony 61', (yellow card) 62'	Report	Kanu (yellow card) 18'	Stadium: Allianz Parque; Attendance: 40,198; Referee: Jonathan Benkenstein Pinheiro (Rio Grande do Sul)

11 July 2024 16	Palmeiras	3–1	Atlético Goianiense	São Paulo
19:30 UTC−3	López 6'; Estêvão (yellow card) 38'; Gabriel Menino (yellow card) 45+2'; Raphael Veiga 51'; Alix 53' (o.g.)	Report	Shaylon 9'; Baralhas (yellow card) 49'; Max (yellow card) 80'	Stadium: Allianz Parque; Attendance: 26,897; Referee: Wagner do Nascimento Magalhães (Rio de Janeiro)

17 July 2024 17	Botafogo	1–0	Palmeiras	Rio de Janeiro
21:30 UTC−3	Barboza (yellow card) 4'; Tiquinho Soares 56'; Suárez (yellow card) 73'	Report		Stadium: Nilton Santos; Attendance: 39,570; Referee: Anderson Daronco (Rio Grande do Sul)

20 July 2024 18	Palmeiras	2–0	Cruzeiro	São Paulo
21:00 UTC−3	López 36', (yellow card) 59'; Raphael Veiga (yellow card) 61'; Zé Rafael (yellow card) 69'; Maurício (yellow card) 77'; Gabriel Menino 90+2'	Report	Barreal (yellow card) 38'; Romero (yellow card) 45+4'; Matheus Pereira (yellow card) 69'; João Marcelo (yellow card) 90+4'	Stadium: Allianz Parque; Attendance: 40,465; Referee: Davi de Oliveira Lacerda (Espírito Santo)

24 July 2024 19	Fluminense	1–0	Palmeiras	Rio de Janeiro
21:30 UTC−3	Thiago Santos (yellow card) 19'; Ganso (yellow card) 42'; Arias 87'	Report	Gómez (yellow card) 31'; Raphael Veiga (yellow card) 43'; Zé Rafael (yellow card) 57'	Stadium: Maracanã; Attendance: 51,375; Referee: Wilton Pereira Sampaio (Goiás)

27 July 2024 20	Palmeiras	0–2	Vitória	São Paulo
19:00 UTC−3	Gabriel Menino (yellow card) 50'; López (yellow card) 90'	Report	Muriel (yellow card) 28'; Lucas Esteves (yellow card) 36'; Osvaldo (yellow card) 51', (goal) 52'; Edu (yellow card) 73'; Janderson (yellow card) 80'; Matheuzinho 83'; José Breno (red card) 90+2'; Everaldo (yellow card) 90+4'	Stadium: Allianz Parque; Attendance: 39,609; Referee: Caio Max Augusto Vieira (Rio Grande do Norte)

4 August 2024 21	Internacional	1–1	Palmeiras	Porto Alegre
17:00 UTC−3	Bruno Henrique 31'; Gabriel Carvalho (yellow card) 45+1'; Borré (yellow card) 45+5'	Report	Rony 88'	Stadium: Beira-Rio; Attendance: 30,668; Referee: Wagner do Nascimento Magalhães (Rio de Janeiro)

11 August 2024 22	Flamengo	1–1	Palmeiras	Rio de Janeiro
16:00 UTC−3	Pulgar (yellow card) 22'; De Arrascaeta 69'	Report	Moreno (yellow card) 15'; Murilo (yellow card) 42' (yellow-red card) 90+3'; Gómez (yellow card) 51'; Luighi 86'	Stadium: Maracanã; Attendance: 55,051; Referee: Wilton Pereira Sampaio (Goiás)

18 August 2024 23	Palmeiras	2–1	São Paulo	São Paulo
16:00 UTC−3	Vitor Reis (yellow card) 45+2'; López 52', 90+12', (yellow card) 90+14'; Gómez (yellow card) 59'; Marcos Rocha (yellow card) 90+2'	Report	Sabino (yellow card) 43'; Luciano 72', (yellow card) 74' (yellow-red card) 90+6'	Stadium: Allianz Parque; Attendance: 35,791; Referee: Raphael Claus (São Paulo)

24 August 2024 24	Palmeiras	5–0	Cuiabá	Campinas
18:30 UTC−3	Murilo 15'; Estêvão 27' (pen.), 32'; Maurício 45+2'; Ríos (yellow card) 53'; Felipe Anderson 56'	Report	Clayson (yellow card) 84'	Stadium: Brinco de Ouro; Attendance: 16,566; Referee: Alex Gomes Stefano (Rio de Janeiro)
Note: Match moved to the Estádio Brinco de Ouro due to the a concert scheduled for the same date in the Allianz Parque.

1 September 2024 25	Athletico Paranaense	0–2	Palmeiras	Curitiba
18:30 UTC−3	Christian (yellow card) 31'; Canobbio (yellow card) 45+1'	Report	Maurício 8'; Marcos Rocha (yellow card) 48'; Estêvão 58'	Stadium: Ligga Arena; Attendance: 28,334; Referee: Bráulio da Silva Machado (Santa Catarina)

15 September 2024 26	Palmeiras	5–0	Criciúma	São Paulo
16:00 UTC−3	López 1'; Felipe Anderson 15'; Tobias Figueiredo 18' (o.g.); Estêvão 52'; Caio Paulista (red card) 67'; Raphael Veiga 77'	Report	Walisson Maia (yellow card) 60'; Tobias Figueiredo (yellow card) 63'	Stadium: Allianz Parque; Attendance: 40,035; Referee: Alex Gomes Stefano (Rio de Janeiro)

22 September 2024 27	Vasco	0–1	Palmeiras	Brasília
16:00 UTC−3	Vegetti (yellow card) 68'	Report	López 26'; Ríos (yellow card) 75'; Zé Rafael (yellow card) 90+6'; Weverton (yellow card) 90+7'	Stadium: Mané Garrincha; Attendance: 62,186; Referee: Rafael Rodrigo Klein (Rio Grande do Sul)

28 September 2024 28	Palmeiras	2–1	Atlético Mineiro	Campinas
18:30 UTC−3	Fabinho (yellow card) 25'; Raphael Veiga 45+2' (pen.), 86' (pen.); Murilo (yellow card) 45+6'	Report	Rubens (yellow card) 26'; Igor Gomes (yellow card) 45'; Hulk 68'	Stadium: Brinco de Ouro; Attendance: 16,040; Referee: Bruno Arleu de Araújo (Rio de Janeiro)

5 October 2024 29	Red Bull Bragantino	0–0	Palmeiras	Bragança Paulista
16:30 UTC−3	Jadsom (yellow card) 45+3'; Ivan Cavaleiro (yellow card) 65'; Eduardo Sasha (yellow card) 90+5'; Cleiton (yellow card) 90+8'; Lucas Cunha (red card) 90+13'	Report	Giay (yellow card) 28'; Ríos (yellow card) 41'; Gabriel Menino (yellow card) 90+10' (red card) 90+13'	Stadium: Nabi Abi Chedid; Attendance: 9,980; Referee: Bráulio da Silva Machado (Santa Catarina)
Note: Lucas Cunha and Gabriel Menino were sent off after the match ended.

20 October 2024 30	Juventude	3–5	Palmeiras	Caxias do Sul
20:00 UTC−3	Danilo Boza 35'; Ronaldo 49'; Edson Carioca 67'; Jadson (yellow card) 79'; Jean Carlos (yellow card) 90+4'	Report	Estêvão 22'; Marcos Rocha (yellow card) 30'; Raphael Veiga 43', 50', 90'; Moreno (yellow card) 52'; Ríos 63', (yellow card) 73'; Gómez (yellow card) 72'; Mayke (yellow card) 74'	Stadium: Alfredo Jaconi; Attendance: 10,102; Referee: Alex Gomes Stefano (Rio de Janeiro)

26 October 2024 31	Palmeiras	2–2	Fortaleza	São Paulo
16:30 UTC−3	Mayke (yellow card) 18'; Raphael Veiga 29' (pen.); Estêvão 57' (pen.)	Report	Mancuso (yellow card) 24'; Hércules 38'; Moisés 62'; Titi (yellow card) 72'; Lucero (yellow card) 76'; Pedro Augusto (yellow card) 90+3'; Brítez (yellow card) 90+7'	Stadium: Allianz Parque; Attendance: 40,321; Referee: Ramon Abatti Abel (Santa Catarina)

4 November 2024 32	Corinthians	2–0	Palmeiras	São Paulo
20:00 UTC−3	Hugo (yellow card) 37'; Garro 41'; Yuri Alberto 56'; Matheuzinho (yellow card) 60'	Report	Moreno (yellow card) 67'; Gabriel Menino (yellow card) 81'; Marcos Rocha (yellow card) 90+1'	Stadium: Neo Química Arena; Attendance: 46,473; Referee: Wilton Pereira Sampaio (Goiás)

8 November 2024 33	Palmeiras	1–0	Grêmio	São Paulo
21:30 UTC−3	Murilo (yellow card) 16'; Gómez (yellow card) 32'; Estêvão 73', (yellow card) 74'; Ríos (yellow card) 86'; Mayke (yellow card) 88'	Report	Jemerson (yellow card) 26'; Villasanti (yellow card) 28'; Monsalve (yellow card) 90+3'	Stadium: Allianz Parque; Attendance: 33,670; Referee: Marcelo de Lima Henrique (Ceará)

20 November 2024 34	Bahia	1–2	Palmeiras	Salvador
18:00 UTC−3	Rodríguez 27'; Gilberto (yellow card) 74'	Report	Raphael Veiga 41'; Marcos Rocha (yellow card) 71'; López 89'	Stadium: Arena Fonte Nova; Attendance: 35,993; Referee: Wagner do Nascimento Magalhães (Rio de Janeiro)

23 November 2024 35	Atlético Goianiense	0–1	Palmeiras	Goiânia
19:30 UTC−3	Gabriel Baralhas (yellow card) 4'; Luiz Fernando (yellow card) 39'; Roni (yellow card) 64'	Report	Raphael Veiga 20'; Zé Rafael (yellow card) 89'; López (yellow card) 90+5'	Stadium: Antônio Accioly; Attendance: 11,216; Referee: Jonathan Benkenstein Pinheiro (Rio Grande do Sul)

26 November 2024 36	Palmeiras	1–3	Botafogo	São Paulo
21:30 UTC−3	Marcos Rocha (red card) 70'; Mayke (yellow card) 83'; Ríos 90+3'; Gómez (yellow card) 90+6'	Report	Gregore 19'; Alex Telles (yellow card) 45+4'; Barboza (yellow card) 46'; John (yellow card) 58'; Almada (yellow card) 62'; Savarino 73'; Adryelson 89'	Stadium: Allianz Parque; Attendance: 31,753; Referee: Wilton Pereira Sampaio (Goiás)

4 December 2024 37	Cruzeiro	1–2	Palmeiras	Belo Horizonte
21:30 UTC−3	Matheus Pereira 52'; Marlon (yellow card) 56'; Zé Ivaldo (yellow card) 68'; Anderson (yellow card) 71'	Report	Maurício 61'; Vitor Reis (yellow card) 85'; Estêvão 90'	Stadium: Mineirão; Attendance: 0 Referee: Anderson Daronco (Rio Grande do Sul)
Note: This match was played behind closed doors due to security reasons regarding incidents involving organized supporters from both teams.

8 December 2024 38	Palmeiras	0–1	Fluminense	São Paulo
16:00 UTC−3	Marcos Rocha (yellow card) 85'; Estêvão (yellow card) 90+3'	Report	Lima (yellow card) 7'; Serna 37'; Cano (yellow card) 41'; Fábio (yellow card) 83'; Kauã Elias (yellow card) 90+4'; Martinelli (yellow card) 90+7'	Stadium: Allianz Parque; Attendance: 34,571; Referee: Ramon Abatti Abel (Santa Catarina)

=== Copa do Brasil ===
==== Third round ====
The draw for the third round was held on 17 April 2024. The order of the matches were announced later on the same day.

2 May 2024 First leg	Palmeiras (São Paulo (state))	2–1	(São Paulo (state)) Botafogo	São Paulo
21:30 UTC−3	Mayke (yellow card) 34'; Rony 57'; Estêvão (yellow card) 90+7', (goal) 90+8'	Report	Gustavo Bochecha (yellow card) 41'; Lucas Dias (yellow card) 45'; Alex Sandro (yellow card) 59'; Patrick Brey 90'; Douglas Baggio (yellow card) 90+8'	Stadium: Allianz Parque; Attendance: 33,010; Referee: Bruno Pereira Vasconcelos (Bahia)

23 May 2024 Second leg	Botafogo (São Paulo (state))	0–0 (1–2 agg.)	(São Paulo (state)) Palmeiras	Ribeirão Preto
19:00 UTC−3	Schappo (yellow card) 30'; Lucas Dias (yellow card) 87'	Report	Ríos (yellow card) 17'; Zé Rafael (yellow card) 38'; Piquerez (yellow card) 90'	Stadium: Estádio Santa Cruz; Attendance: 18,036; Referee: Anderson Daronco (Rio Grande do Sul)

==== Round of 16 ====
The draw for the round of 16 was held on 18 July 2024. The order of the matches were announced later on the same day.

31 July 2024 First leg	Flamengo (Rio de Janeiro (state))	2–0	(São Paulo (state)) Palmeiras	Rio de Janeiro
20:00 UTC−3	Pulgar (yellow card) 33'; Pedro 57'; Luiz Araújo 73'	Report	Raphael Veiga (yellow card) 34'; Gómez (yellow card) 42'; Vitor Reis (yellow card) 80'; Lázaro (yellow card) 82'	Stadium: Maracanã; Attendance: 59,502; Referee: Bráulio da Silva Machado (Santa Catarina)

7 August 2024 Second leg	Palmeiras (São Paulo (state))	1–0 (1–2 agg.)	(Rio de Janeiro (state)) Flamengo	São Paulo
20:00 UTC−3	Vitor Reis 7'	Report	Allan (yellow card) 45+2'; Pedro (yellow card) 62'; David Luiz (yellow card) 77'	Stadium: Allianz Parque; Attendance: 38,463; Referee: Anderson Daronco (Rio Grande do Sul)

=== Supercopa do Brasil ===
Palmeiras qualified for the 2024 Supercopa do Brasil by winning the 2023 Campeonato Brasileiro Série A.

4 February 2024	Palmeiras (São Paulo (state))	0–0 (2–4 p)	(São Paulo (state)) São Paulo	Belo Horizonte
16:00 UTC−3	Raphael Veiga (yellow card) 15'; Zé Rafael (yellow card) 23'; López (yellow card) 32'; Marcos Rocha (yellow card) 90+1'; Luis Guilherme (yellow card) 90+5'	Report	Luciano (yellow card) 2'; Pablo Maia (yellow card) 64'; Welington (yellow card) 73'; Erick (yellow card) 90+2'	Stadium: Mineirão; Attendance: 42,741; Referee: Bráulio da Silva Machado (Santa Catarina)
	Penalties
	Raphael Veiga (penalty scored); Gabriel Menino (penalty scored); Murilo (penalty missed); Piquerez (penalty missed)		(penalty scored) Calleri; (penalty scored) Galoppo; (penalty scored) Pablo Maia; (penalty scored) Araújo

== Statistics ==
=== Overall statistics ===
Games played	67 (16 Campeonato Paulista, 8 Copa Libertadores, 38 Série A, 4 Copa do Brasil, 1 Supercopa do Brasil)
Games won	39 (11 Campeonato Paulista, 4 Copa Libertadores, 22 Série A, 2 Copa do Brasil, 0 Supercopa do Brasil)
Games drawn	16 (4 Campeonato Paulista, 3 Copa Libertadores, 7 Série A, 1 Copa do Brasil, 1 Supercopa do Brasil)
Games lost	12 (1 Campeonato Paulista, 1 Copa Libertadores, 9 Série A, 1 Copa do Brasil, 0 Supercopa do Brasil)
Goals scored	108
Goals conceded	56
Goal difference	+52 (+17 Campeonato Paulista, +8 Copa Libertadores, +27 Série A, 0 Copa do Brasil, 0 Supercopa do Brasil)
Clean sheets	28
Most clean sheets	Weverton (25)
Best result	5–0 (vs. Liverpool, Copa Libertadores – May 9); 5–0 (vs. Cuiabá, Série A – August 24); 5–0 (vs. Criciúma, Série A – September 15)
Worst result	0–3 (vs. Fortaleza, Série A – June 26)
Yellow cards	148
Red cards	5
Top scorer	López (22 goals)

=== Goalscorers ===
In italic players who left the team in mid-season.

Place	Position	Nationality	Number	Name	Campeonato Paulista	Copa Libertadores	Série A	Copa do Brasil	Supercopa do Brasil	Total
1	FW	(Argentina)	42	López	10	2	10	0	0	22
2	MF	(Brazil)	23	Raphael Veiga	7	2	11	0	0	20
3	FW	(Brazil)	41	Estêvão	0	1	13	1	0	15
4	FW	(Brazil)	10	Rony	3	2	4	1	0	10
5	FW	(Brazil)	9	Endrick	2	2	0	0	0	4
5	MF	(Argentina)	5	Moreno	2	1	1	0	0	4
5	DF	(Uruguay)	22	Piquerez	1	1	2	0	0	4
5	MF	(Colombia)	27	Ríos	0	1	3	0	0	4
5	MF	(Brazil)	18	Maurício	0	1	3	0	0	4
6	FW	(Brazil)	17	Lázaro	0	1	2	0	0	3
6	DF	(Paraguay)	15	Gómez	0	2	1	0	0	3
7	MF	(Brazil)	25	Gabriel Menino	1	0	1	0	0	2
7	DF	(Brazil)	44	Vitor Reis	0	0	1	1	0	2
7	MF	(Brazil)	9	Felipe Anderson	0	0	2	0	0	2
8	FW	(Brazil)	19	Breno Lopes	1	0	0	0	0	1
8	MF	(Brazil)	31	Luis Guilherme	0	1	0	0	0	1
8	DF	(Brazil)	12	Mayke	0	0	1	0	0	1
8	MF	(Brazil)	35	Fabinho	0	0	1	0	0	1
8	FW	(Brazil)	57	Luighi	0	0	1	0	0	1
8	DF	(Brazil)	26	Murilo	0	0	1	0	0	1
