= Luis Guilherme =

Brazilian footballer (born 2006)

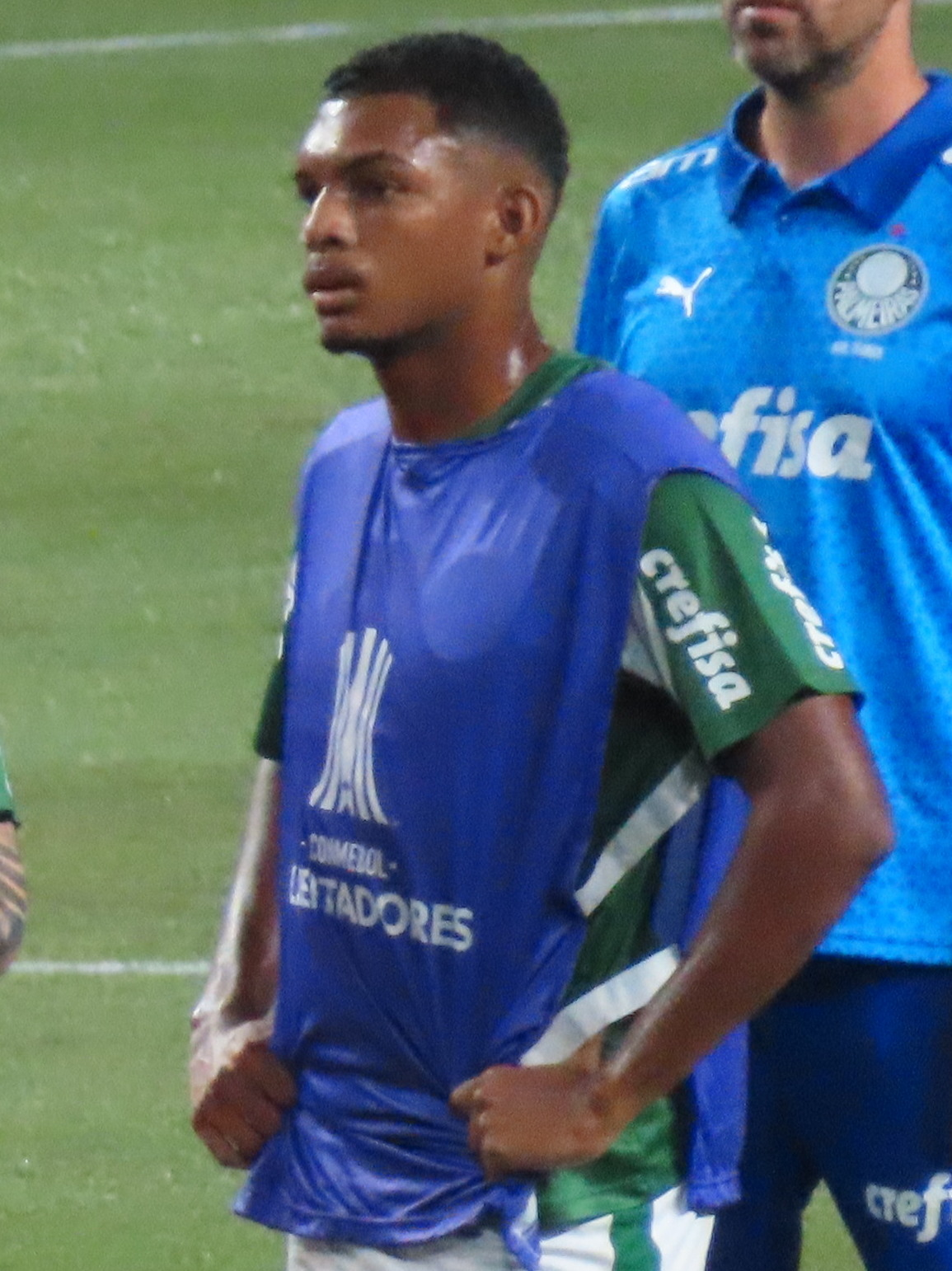
- Luis Guilherme with Palmeiras in 2024

Personal information
- Full name: Luis Guilherme Lira dos Santos
- Date of birth: 9 February 2006 (age 20)
- Place of birth: Aracaju, Brazil
- Height: 1.75 m (5 ft 9 in)
- Position: Winger

Team information
- Current team: Sporting CP
- Number: 31

Youth career
- 2017–2023: Palmeiras

Senior career*
Years	Team	Apps	(Gls)
2023–2024	Palmeiras	30	(0)
2024–2026	West Ham United	17	(0)
2026–	Sporting CP	21	(1)

International career^{‡}
2022	Brazil U17	4	(3)
2023–	Brazil U20	6	(0)
Medal record
Men's football
Representing Brazil
South American U-20 Championship
Winner	2023 Colombia
- * Club domestic league appearances and goals as of 30 October 2026 ‡ National team caps and goals as of 21:04, 1 January 2026 (UTC)

Luis Guilherme Lira dos Santos (born 9 February 2006) is a Brazilian professional footballer who plays as a winger for Primeira Liga club Sporting CP.

== Club career ==
=== Palmeiras ===
Born in Aracaju, Sergipe, Luis Guilherme played in numerous soccer schools in his hometown before joining Palmeiras in 2017. He signed his first professional contract with the club in June 2022. In January 2022, Luis Guilherme was part of the squad that won the 2022 Copa São Paulo de Futebol Júnior for the first time. He renewed his contract in November 2023, with an increased salary and a release clause of €55 million.

Luis Guilherme made his first team debut on 12 April 2023, coming on as a second-half substitute for José Manuel López in a 4–2 home win over Tombense, for the year's Copa do Brasil. On 24 April 2024, he scored his first goal for Palmeiras, in the 96th minute, securing a 3–2 away win over Independiente del Valle during the 2024 Copa Libertadores group stage.

=== West Ham United ===
In June 2024, he underwent a medical with English Premier League club West Ham United with a view to a transfer. On 13 June 2024, the club announced that they had agreed the signing of Guilherme on a five-year contract, the transfer being finalised the following day when the transfer window opened. He made his West Ham debut on 5 October coming on as an 85th minute substitute for Mohammed Kudus in a 4–1 Premier League win against Ipswich Town.

=== Sporting CP ===
On 4 January 2026, Luis Guilherme moved to Primeira Liga club Sporting CP on a contract until June 2030, with his release clause set at €80 million. According to reports, the Portuguese side paid the Hammers an initial €14 million, which could rise to €17 million with add-ons. He made his debut two days later, coming on as a substitute for the final minutes of the Taça da Liga semi-final, as Sporting CP suffered two late goals to lose 2–1 against Vitória de Guimarães.

== International career ==
He was called up to the Brazil U17 for the 2022 Montaigu Tournament, where he scored three goals in four games and helped Brazil win the tournament after 38 years. Luis Guilherme was later called up to the Brazil U20 for the 2023 South American U-20 Championship, being the youngest player of the Brazil U20 squad in the 21st century. Luis Guilherme played in five matches, totalling 191 minutes, contributing to Brazil's first U20 South American Championship title in 12 years and securing a spot in the FIFA U-20 World Cup after an eight-year absence.

== Style of play ==
A technical winger with good on-field decision making, Luis Guilherme is renowned for his pace, clocking a top speed of 36.4 km/h in the 2022 Copa do Brasil Sub-17 final against Vasco da Gama. He lists Argentine legend Lionel Messi and Rivaldo as inspirations to him. On 11 October 2023, he was named by English newspaper The Guardian as one of the best players born in 2006 worldwide, alongside Palmeiras teammates Endrick and Vitor Reis.

== Career statistics ==
As of match played 30 October 2026

Appearances and goals by club, season and competition
Club	Season	League			State league (Note: Includes Campeonato Paulista)		National cup (Note: Includes Copa do Brasil, FA Cup)		League cup (Note: Includes Taça da Liga)		Continental		Other		Total	
Club	Season	Division	Apps	Goals	Apps	Goals	Apps	Goals	Apps	Goals	Apps	Goals	Apps	Goals	Apps	Goals
Palmeiras	2023	Série A	19	0	—		5	0	—		3 (Note: Appearances in Copa Libertadores)	0	—		27	0
Palmeiras	2024	Série A	5	0	6	0	1	0	—		5	1	1 (Note: Appearance in Supercopa do Brasil)	0	18	1
Palmeiras	Total		24	0	6	0	6	0	—		8	1	1	0	45	1
West Ham United	2024–25	Premier League	12	0	—		1	0	0	0	—		—		13	0
West Ham United	2025–26	Premier League	5	0	—		—		0	0	—		—		5	0
West Ham United	Total		17	0	—		1	0	0	0	—		—		18	0
Sporting CP	2025–26	Primeira Liga	13	1	—		4	1	1	0	1 (Note: Appearances in UEFA Champions League)	0	—		19	2
Sporting CP	2026–27	Primeira Liga	8	0	—		0	0	0	0	3	0	—		11	0
Sporting CP	Total		21	1	—		4	1	1	0	4	0	—		30	2
Career total			62	1	6	0	11	1	1	0	12	1	1	0	93	3

== Honours ==
Palmeiras

- Campeonato Brasileiro Série A: 2023
- Campeonato Paulista: 2024
- Supercopa do Brasil runner-up: 2024

Brazil U20

- U-20 South American Championship: 2023
