= Vitor Reis =

Brazilian footballer (born 2006)

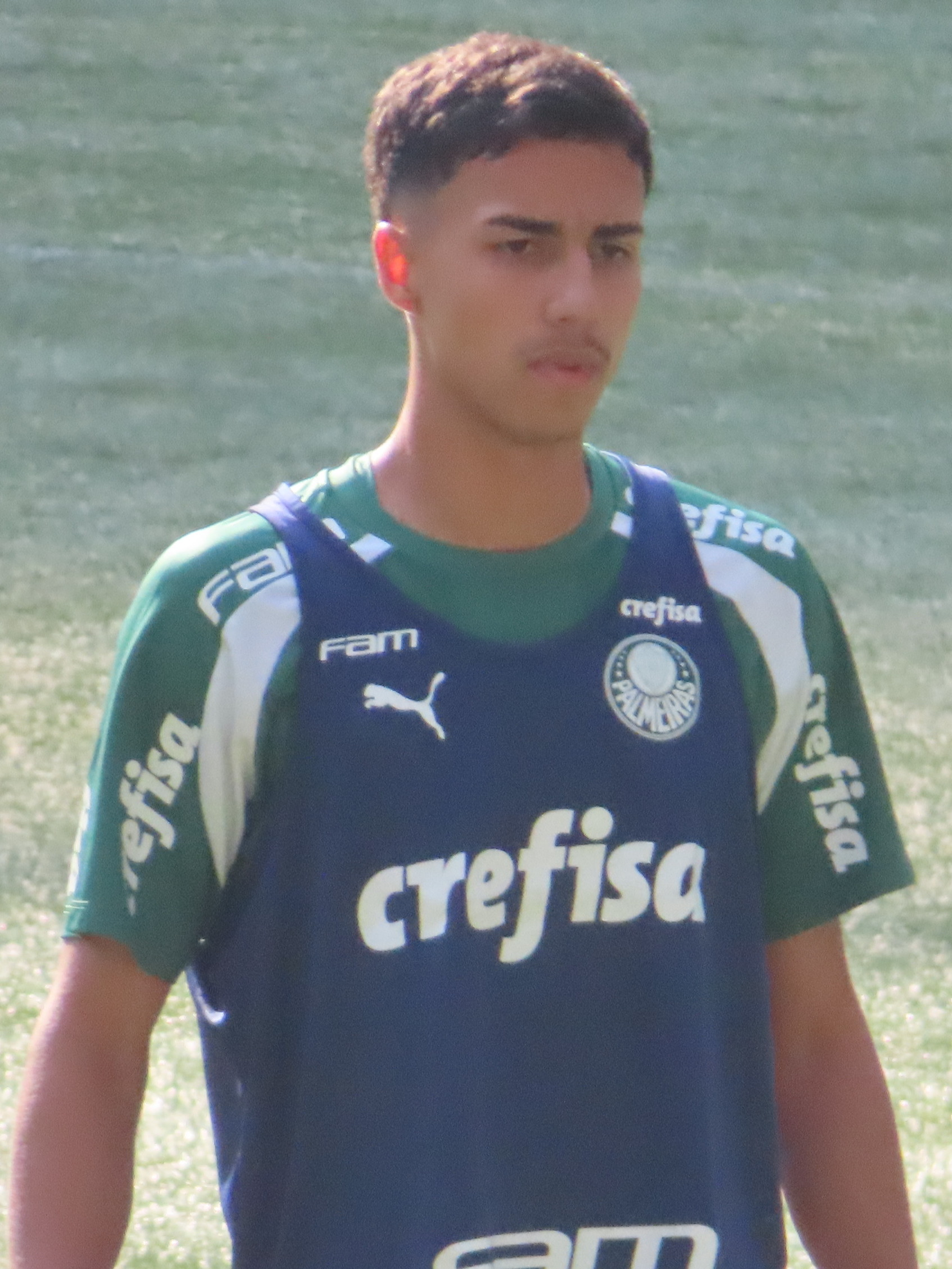
- Vitor Reis warming up for Palmeiras in 2024

Personal information
- Full name: Vitor de Oliveira Nunes dos Reis
- Date of birth: 12 January 2006 (age 20)
- Place of birth: Santana, São José dos Campos, São Paulo, Brazil
- Height: 1.86 m (6 ft 1 in)
- Position: Centre-back

Team information
- Current team: Manchester City
- Number: 22

Youth career
- R10 Academy
- 2016–2024: Palmeiras

Senior career*
Years	Team	Apps	(Gls)
2024–2025	Palmeiras	18	(1)
2025–	Manchester City	2	(0)
2025–2026	→ Girona (loan)	36	(1)

International career^{‡}
2022	Brazil U16	1	(0)
2022–2023	Brazil U17	9	(1)
2026–	Brazil	3	(0)
- * Club domestic league appearances and goals as of 23:44, 28 August 2026 (UTC) ‡ National team caps and goals as of 25 September 2026

Vitor de Oliveira Nunes dos Reis (born 12 January 2006) is a Brazilian professional footballer who plays as a centre-back for Premier League club Manchester City and the Brazil national team.

== Club career ==
=== Palmeiras ===
Born in Santana, São José dos Campos, in the Brazilian state of São Paulo, Reis began his career at the R10 Academy in São José dos Campos – an academy run by Robinho – before joining the academy of professional side Palmeiras in 2016 at the age of ten.

Reis established himself as a key player for Palmeiras' youth teams, often captaining the sides he played in, and played in the final of the 2022 edition of the Copa do Brasil Sub-17. However, during the game he collided with a Vasco da Gama player and suffered a concussion as a result, needing to be taken to hospital after regaining consciousness on the pitch. Following the game, Reis thanked fans on social media, stating that he was fine after the incident. He signed his first professional contract with Palmeiras towards the end of the 2022 season, penning a deal through 2025.

On 11 October 2023, Reis was named by English newspaper The Guardian as one of the best players born in 2006 worldwide, alongside former Palmeiras teammates Endrick and Luis Guilherme. He played for the under-20 squad in the 2024 Copa São Paulo de Futebol Júnior before starting to train with the first team in May of that year.

Reis made his first team – and Série A – debut on 26 June 2024, coming on as a second-half substitute for Murilo in a 3–0 away loss to Fortaleza. He scored his first senior goal on 1 July, netting his side's second in a 2–0 home win over rivals Corinthians; it was also the first start of his senior career. He subsequently established himself as a starter, contributing with a further goal in 22 appearances during the year.

=== Manchester City ===
On 21 January 2025, Reis joined Premier League club Manchester City on a four-and-a-half-year deal for a fee worth £29.6 million. On 8 February, Reis made his debut for the club in a 2–1 FA Cup fourth round away win over EFL League One side Leyton Orient. He was substituted off for fellow January signing Abdukodir Khusanov at half-time. On 2 April, Reis made his league debut for City in a 2–0 home victory against Leicester City, coming on as a substitute for Joško Gvardiol in the 92nd minute.

==== Loan to Girona ====
On 8 August 2025, Reis joined La Liga club Girona on a season-long loan deal.

After a start that saw him pick up the first red card of his career in a 0-4 loss to Levante on 20 September 2025, Reis enjoyed a run of form in January 2026 that saw him win the La Liga U23 Player of the Month award. During this month, he scored his first goal for the club, a 95th minute equaliser against Getafe, on 26 January 2026, before returning to the City fold ahead of the 2026/27 season.

== International career ==
Reis has represented Brazil at under-16 level, featuring at the 2022 Montaigu Tournament. He was called up to the under-17 squad in October 2022 for friendlies against Chile and Paraguay the following month.

Reis was called up for Brazil for the first time for a friendly against Croatia in March 2026. However he did not leave the bench and was also left out of the 26-player list for the 2026 FIFA World Cup, despite making the cut for the preliminary list.

In October 2026, Reis made his debut on a away 1–1 friendly draw against Australia during the new expanded FIFA International Match Date.

== Career statistics ==
As of match played 28 October 2026

Appearances and goals by club, season and competition
Club	Season	League			State league		National cup (Note: Includes Copa do Brasil, FA Cup, Copa del Rey)		League cup (Note: Includes EFL Cup)		Continental		Other		Total	
Club	Season	Division	Apps	Goals	Apps	Goals	Apps	Goals	Apps	Goals	Apps	Goals	Apps	Goals	Apps	Goals
Palmeiras	2024	Série A	18	1	0	0	2	1	—		2 (Note: Appearances in Copa Libertadores)	0	0	0	22	2
Manchester City	2024–25	Premier League	1	0	—		2	0	—		0	0	1 (Note: Appearance in FIFA Club World Cup)	0	4	0
Manchester City	2026–27	Premier League	1	0	—		0	0	2	1	1 (Note: Appearance in UEFA Champions League)	0	0	0	4	1
Manchester City	Total		2	0	—		2	0	2	0	1	0	1	0	8	1
Girona (loan)	2025–26	La Liga	36	1	—		2	0	—		—		—		38	1
Career total			56	2	0	0	6	1	2	1	3	0	1	0	68	4

== Honours ==
Manchester City

- FA Cup runner-up: 2024–25

Individual

- Troféu Mesa Redonda Team of the Year: 2024
- La Liga U23 Player of the Month: January 2026
