= Troféu Mesa Redonda =

Troféu Mesa Redonda (English: Round Table Trophy) is an award held by TV Gazeta and Fundação Cásper Líbero to honor the best players of each season of Brazilian football.

== History ==
Held for the first time in 2004, the award aims in the same way as the Bola de Prata, a traditional award from Revista Placar, but focusing on the performance of athletes throughout the all tournaments in the season, not just in the Campeonato Brasileiro Série A.

== Rules ==
The trophy is awarded in a first stage by voting open to the public on the internet, with the three players with the most votes by position (goalkeepers, midfielders, etc.) sent to a second stage, where sports journalists from the Mesa Redonda program and other notables choose the final winners.

== Team of the Year ==
Players marked bold won the "Best Player award" in that respective year.

| Season | Category | | | |
| Season | Goalkeeper | Defenders | Midfielders | Forwards |
|---|---|---|---|---|
| 2004 | (Brazil) Rogério Ceni (São Paulo) | (Brazil) Cicinho (São Paulo) (Uruguay) Diego Lugano (São Paulo) (Brazil) Dininho (São Caetano) (Brazil) Léo (Santos) | (Brazil) Mineiro (São Caetano) (Brazil) Fabinho (Corinthians) (Brazil) Ricardinho (Santos) (Brazil) Jádson (Atlético Paranaense) | (Brazil) Robinho (Santos) (Brazil) Washington (Atlético Paranaense) |
| 2005 | (Brazil) Rogério Ceni (São Paulo) | (Brazil) Eduardo Ratinho (Corinthians) (Uruguay) Diego Lugano (São Paulo) (Paraguay) Carlos Gamarra (Palmeiras) (Brazil) Gustavo Nery (Corinthians) | (Brazil) Mineiro (São Paulo) (Brazil) Tinga (Internacional) (Federal Republic of Yugoslavia) Dejan Petković (Fluminense) (Brazil) Roger (Corinthians) | (Argentina) Carlos Tevez (Corinthians) (Brazil) Rafael Sóbis (Internacional) |
| 2006 | (Brazil) Rogério Ceni (São Paulo) | (Brazil) Souza (São Paulo) (Brazil) Fabiano Eller (Internacional) (Brazil) Miranda (São Paulo) (Brazil) Júnior (São Paulo) | (Brazil) Mineiro (São Paulo) (Brazil) Lucas Leiva (Grêmio) (Brazil) Zé Roberto (Santos) (Brazil) Morais (Vasco da Gama) | (Brazil) Fernandão (Internacional) (Brazil) Aloísio (São Paulo) |
| 2007 | (Brazil) Rogério Ceni (São Paulo) | (Brazil) Leonardo Moura (Flamengo) (Brazil) Breno (São Paulo) (Brazil) Miranda (São Paulo) (Brazil) Kléber (Santos) | (Brazil) Richarlyson (São Paulo) (Brazil) Hernanes (São Paulo) (Chile) Jorge Valdivia (Palmeiras) (Brazil) Thiago Neves (Fluminense) | (Brazil) Dodô (Botafogo) (Brazil) Finazzi (Corinthians) |
| 2008 | (Brazil) Marcos (Palmeiras) | (Brazil) Leonardo Moura (Flamengo) (Brazil) Fábio Luciano (Flamengo) (Brazil) Miranda (São Paulo) (Brazil) Leandro (Palmeiras) | (Brazil) Ramires (Cruzeiro) (Brazil) Hernanes (São Paulo) (Brazil) Jorge Wagner (São Paulo) (Brazil) Wágner (Cruzeiro) | (Brazil) Borges (São Paulo) (Brazil) Kléber Gladiador (Palmeiras) |
| 2009 | (Brazil) Marcos (Palmeiras) | (Brazil) Leonardo Moura (Flamengo) (Brazil) Danilo (Palmeiras) (Brazil) Miranda (São Paulo) (Brazil) Júlio César (Goiás) | (Brazil) Pierre (Palmeiras) (Brazil) Hernanes (São Paulo) (Brazil) Cleiton Xavier (Palmeiras) (Serbia) Dejan Petković (Flamengo) | (Brazil) Adriano (Flamengo) (Brazil) Fred (Fluminense) |
| 2010 | (Brazil) Júlio César (Corinthians) | (Brazil) Mariano (Fluminense) (Brazil) Chicão (Corinthians) (Brazil) Leandro Euzébio (Fluminense) (Brazil) Roberto Carlos (Corinthians) | (Brazil) Marcos Assunção (Palmeiras) (Brazil) Elias (Corinthians) (Argentina) Walter Montillo (Cruzeiro) (Argentina) Darío Conca (Fluminense) | (Brazil) Neymar (Santos) (Brazil) Jonas (Grêmio) |
| 2011 | (Brazil) Júlio César (Corinthians) | (Brazil) Fagner (Vasco da Gama) (Brazil) Dedé (Vasco da Gama) (Brazil) Leandro Castán (Corinthians) (Brazil) Cortez (Botafogo) | (Brazil) Ralf (Corinthians) (Brazil) Paulinho (Corinthians) (Brazil) Alex (Corinthians) (Brazil) Thiago Neves (Flamengo) | (Brazil) Neymar (Santos) (Brazil) Leandro Damião (Internacional) |
| 2012 | (Brazil) Diego Cavalieri (Fluminense) | (Brazil) Marcos Rocha (Atlético Mineiro) (Brazil) Dedé (Vasco da Gama) (Brazil) Gilberto Silva (Atlético Mineiro) (Brazil) Carlinhos (Fluminense) | (Brazil) Jean (Fluminense) (Brazil) Paulinho (Corinthians) (Brazil) Ronaldinho (Atlético Mineiro) (Brazil) Lucas Moura (São Paulo) | (Brazil) Neymar (Santos) (Brazil) Fred (Fluminense) |
| 2013 | (Brazil) Jefferson (Botafogo) | (Brazil) Luis Ricardo (Portuguesa) (Brazil) Dedé (Cruzeiro) (Brazil) Paulo André (Corinthians) (Brazil) Alex Telles (Grêmio) | (Brazil) Nílton (Cruzeiro) (Brazil) Elias (Flamengo) (Brazil) Éverton Ribeiro (Cruzeiro) (Brazil) Paulo Baier (Atlético Paranaense) | (Brazil) Willian (Cruzeiro) (Brazil) Hernane (Flamengo) |
| 2014 | (Brazil) Marcelo Grohe (Grêmio) | (Brazil) Marcos Rocha (Atlético Mineiro) (Brazil) Dedé (Cruzeiro) (Brazil) Gil (Corinthians) (Brazil) Egídio (Cruzeiro) | (Brazil) Souza (São Paulo) (Brazil) Éverton Ribeiro (Cruzeiro) (Brazil) Kaká (São Paulo) | (Brazil) Ricardo Goulart (Cruzeiro) (Peru) Paolo Guerrero (Corinthians) (Argentina) Hernán Barcos (Grêmio) |
| 2015 | (Brazil) Cássio (Corinthians) | (Brazil) Lucas (Palmeiras) (Brazil) Gil (Corinthians) (Brazil) Jemerson (Atlético Mineiro) (Brazil) Douglas Santos (Atlético Mineiro) | (Brazil) Elias (Corinthians) (Brazil) Lucas Lima (Santos) (Brazil) Renato Augusto (Corinthians) (Brazil) Jádson (Corinthians) | (Brazil) Luan (Grêmio) (Brazil) Ricardo Oliveira (Santos) |
| 2016 | (Brazil) Alex Muralha (Flamengo) | (Brazil) Fagner (Corinthians) (Colombia) Yerry Mina (Palmeiras) (Brazil) Pedro Geromel (Grêmio) (Brazil) Zeca (Santos) (Brazil) Jorge (Flamengo) | (Brazil) Willian Arão (Flamengo) (Brazil) Tchê Tchê (Palmeiras) (Brazil) Moisés (Palmeiras) (Brazil) Lucas Lima (Santos) (Brazil) Camilo (Botafogo) | (Brazil) Gabriel Jesus (Palmeiras) (Brazil) Ricardo Oliveira (Santos) |
| 2017 | (Brazil) Cássio (Corinthians) | (Brazil) Fagner (Corinthians) (Paraguay) Fabián Balbuena (Corinthians) (Brazil) Pablo (Corinthians) (Brazil) Diego Barbosa (Cruzeiro) | (Brazil) Bruno Silva (Cruzeiro) (Brazil) Gabriel (Corinthians) (Brazil) Moisés (Palmeiras) (Brazil) Hernanes (São Paulo) | (Brazil) Bruno Henrique (Santos) (Brazil) Jô (Corinthians) |
| 2018 | (Brazil) Vanderlei (Santos) | (Brazil) Rodinei (Flamengo) (Brazil) Dedé (Cruzeiro) (Brazil) Pedro Geromel (Grêmio) (Brazil) Reinaldo (São Paulo) | (Brazil) Felipe Melo (Palmeiras) (Brazil) Bruno Henrique (Palmeiras) (Brazil) Lucas Lima (Palmeiras) (Brazil) Lucas Paquetá (Flamengo) | (Brazil) Gabriel Barbosa (Santos) (Brazil) Dudu (Palmeiras) |
| 2019 | (Brazil) Weverton (Palmeiras) | (Brazil) Marcos Rocha (Palmeiras) (Brazil) Lucas Veríssimo (Santos) (Brazil) Bruno Alves (São Paulo) (Brazil) Reinaldo (São Paulo) | (Brazil) Willian Arão (Flamengo) (Brazil) Gerson (Flamengo) (Brazil) Éverton Ribeiro (Flamengo) | (Brazil) Bruno Henrique (Flamengo) (Brazil) Michael (Goiás) (Brazil) Gabriel Barbosa (Flamengo) |
| 2020 | (Brazil) Weverton (Palmeiras) | (Brazil) Fagner (Corinthians) (Brazil) Lucas Veríssimo (Santos) (Paraguay) Gustavo Gómez (Palmeiras) (Brazil) Guilherme Arana (Atlético Mineiro) | (Brazil) Edenilson (Internacional) (Uruguay) Giorgian de Arrascaeta (Flamengo) (Brazil) Claudinho (Red Bull Bragantino) | (Brazil) Marinho (Santos) (Venezuela) Yeferson Soteldo (Santos) (Brazil) Thiago Galhardo (Internacional) |
| 2021 | (Brazil) Weverton (Palmeiras) | (Brazil) Yago Pikachu (Fortaleza) (Paraguay) Júnior Alonso (Atlético Mineiro) (Brazil) Léo Ortiz (Red Bull Bragantino) (Brazil) Guilherme Arana (Atlético Mineiro) | (Brazil) Willian Arão (Flamengo) (Brazil) Raphael Veiga (Palmeiras) (Argentina) Nacho Fernández (Atlético Mineiro) | (Brazil) Arthur (Red Bull Bragantino) (Brazil) Hulk (Atlético Mineiro) (Brazil) Bruno Henrique (Flamengo) |
| 2022 | (Brazil) Cássio (Corinthians) | (Brazil) Rodinei (Flamengo) (Brazil) David Luiz (Flamengo) (Brazil) Pedro Henrique (Athletico Paranaense) (Uruguay) Joaquín Piquerez (Palmeiras) | (Brazil) André (Fluminense) (Brazil) Zé Rafael (Palmeiras) (Uruguay) Giorgian de Arrascaeta (Flamengo) (Brazil) Gustavo Scarpa (Palmeiras) | (Brazil) Pedro (Flamengo) (Brazil) Rony (Palmeiras) |
| 2023 | (Brazil) Everson (Atlético Mineiro) | (Brazil) Rafinha (São Paulo) (Brazil) Murilo (Palmeiras) (Brazil) Lucas Beraldo (São Paulo) (Uruguay) Joaquín Piquerez (Palmeiras) | (Brazil) Tchê Tchê (Botafogo) (Paraguay) Mathías Villasanti (Grêmio) (Brazil) Raphael Veiga (Palmeiras) (Brazil) Lucas Moura (São Paulo) | (Uruguay) Luis Suárez (Grêmio) (Brazil) Endrick (Palmeiras) |
| 2024 | (Brazil) Hugo Souza (Corinthians) | (Brazil) William (Cruzeiro) (Brazil) Vitor Reis (Palmeiras) (Argentina) Alan Franco (São Paulo) (Brazil) Alex Telles (Botafogo) | (Brazil) Thiago Maia (Internacional) (Brazil) Raphael Veiga (Palmeiras) (Brazil) Alan Patrick (Internacional) | (Brazil) Estêvão (Palmeiras) (Brazil) Yuri Alberto (Corinthians) (Brazil) Luiz Henrique (Botafogo) |
| 2025 | (Brazil) Hugo Souza (Corinthians) | (Brazil) Matheuzinho (Corinthians) (Paraguay) Gustavo Gómez (Palmeiras) (Brazil) Léo Ortiz (Flamengo) (Brazil) Reinaldo (Mirassol) | (Brazil) Andreas Pereira (Palmeiras) (Brazil) Matheus Pereira (Cruzeiro) (Uruguay) Giorgian de Arrascaeta (Flamengo) | (Argentina) Flaco López (Palmeiras) (Brazil) Vitor Roque (Palmeiras) (Brazil) Kaio Jorge (Cruzeiro) |

== Other awards ==
| Season | Category | | |
| Season | Best Manager | Revelação (Breakthrough Player) | Best Foreign Player |
|---|---|---|---|
| 2004 | (Brazil) Vanderlei Luxemburgo (Santos) | (Brazil) Jádson (Atlético Paranaense) | —N/a |
| 2005 | (Brazil) Émerson Leão (Palmeiras) | (Brazil) Rafael Sóbis (Internacional) | —N/a |
| 2006 | (Brazil) Muricy Ramalho (São Paulo) | (Brazil) Diego Cavalieri (Palmeiras) | —N/a |
| 2007 | (Brazil) Muricy Ramalho (São Paulo) | (Brazil) Felipe (Corinthians) | —N/a |
| 2008 | (Brazil) Muricy Ramalho (São Paulo) | (Brazil) Keirrison (Coritiba) | —N/a |
| 2009 | (Brazil) Silas (Avaí) | (Brazil) Giuliano (Internacional) | —N/a |
| 2010 | (Brazil) Muricy Ramalho (Fluminense) | (Brazil) Bruno César (Corinthians) | —N/a |
| 2011 | (Brazil) Tite (Corinthians) | (Brazil) William Morais† (Corinthians) | —N/a |
| 2012 | (Brazil) Abel Braga (Fluminense) | (Brazil) Bernard (Atlético Mineiro) | —N/a |
| 2013 | (Brazil) Vágner Mancini (Atlético Paranaense) | (Brazil) Marcelo Cirino (Atlético Paranaense) | —N/a |
| 2014 | (Brazil) Marcelo Oliveira (Cruzeiro) | (Brazil) Gabriel Barbosa (Santos) | —N/a |
| 2015 | (Brazil) Tite (Corinthians) | (Brazil) Gabriel Jesus (Palmeiras) | —N/a |
| 2016 | (Brazil) Cuca (Palmeiras) | (Brazil) Vitor Bueno (Santos) | —N/a |
| 2017 | (Brazil) Fábio Carille (Corinthians) | (Brazil) Clayson (Corinthians) | —N/a |
| 2018 | (Brazil) Luiz Felipe Scolari (Palmeiras) | (Brazil) Rodrygo (Santos) | —N/a |
| 2019 | (Portugal) Jorge Jesus (Flamengo) | (Brazil) Talles Magno (Vasco da Gama) | —N/a |
| 2020 | (Portugal) Abel Ferreira (Palmeiras) | (Brazil) Gabriel Menino (Palmeiras) | —N/a |
| 2021 | (Brazil) Cuca (Atlético Mineiro) | (Brazil) João Victor (Corinthians) | —N/a |
| 2022 | (Brazil) Dorival Júnior (Flamengo) | (Brazil) Endrick (Palmeiras) | —N/a |
| 2023 | (Brazil) Dorival Júnior (São Paulo) | (Brazil) Gabriel Moscardo (Corinthians) | —N/a |
| 2024 | (Portugal) Artur Jorge (Botafogo) | (Brazil) Estêvão (Palmeiras) | (Argentina) Rodrigo Garro (Corinthians) |
| 2025 | Filipe Luís (Flamengo) (Italy) Carlo Ancelotti (Brazil national team) | (Brazil) Gui Negão (Corinthians) | (Uruguay) Giorgian de Arrascaeta (Flamengo) |

== See also ==
- Prêmio Craque do Brasileirão
- Bola de Ouro
