= Raphael Veiga =

Brazilian footballer (born 1995)

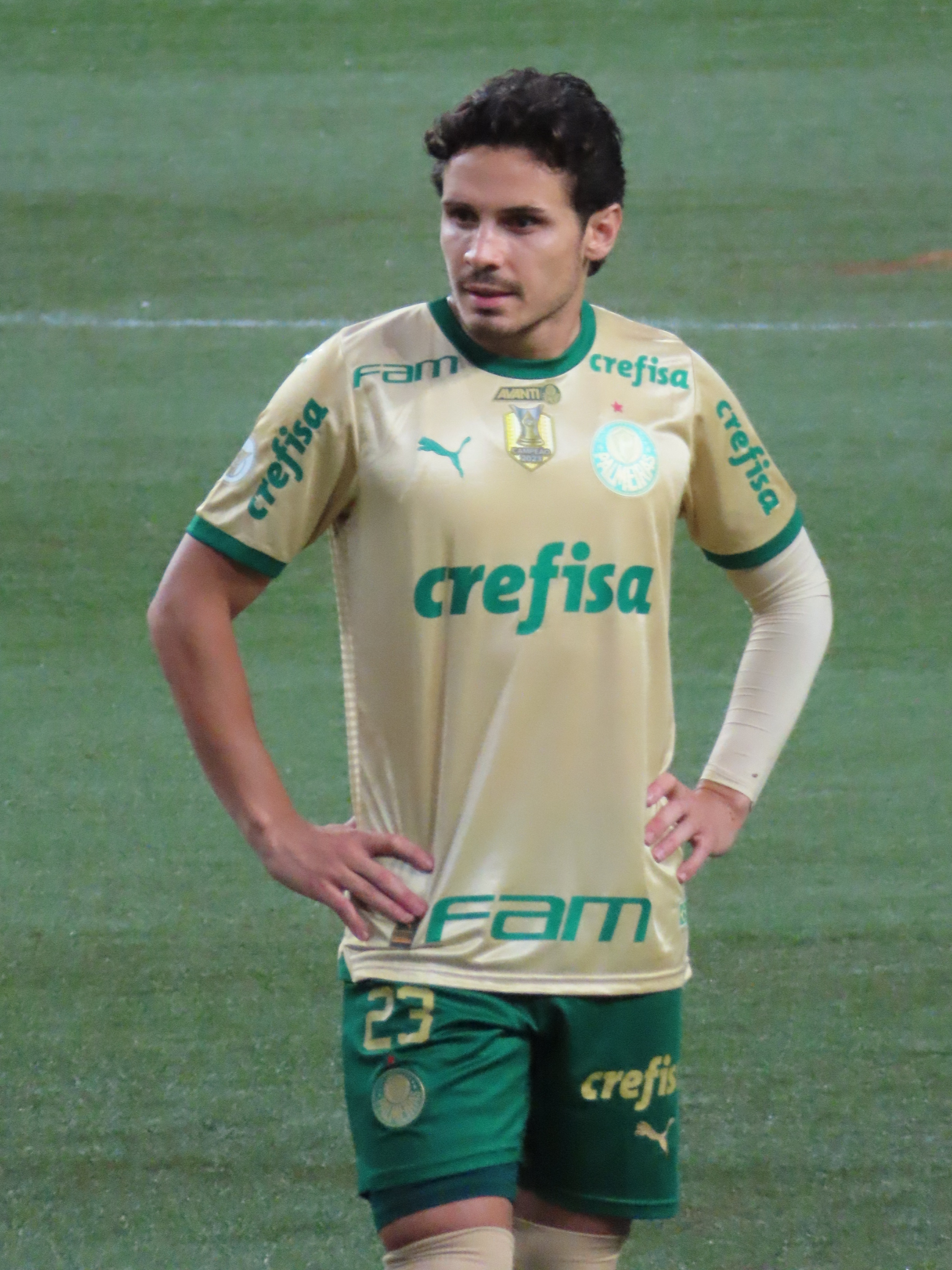
- Veiga with Palmeiras in 2024

Personal information
- Full name: Raphael Cavalcante Veiga
- Date of birth: 19 June 1995 (age 31)
- Place of birth: São Paulo, Brazil
- Height: 1.76 m (5 ft 9 in)
- Position: Attacking midfielder

Team information
- Current team: América (on loan from Palmeiras)
- Number: 23

Youth career
- 2004–2006: Corinthians
- 2007: Fundação Mercedes-Benz
- 2008: São Paulo
- 2008–2009: Portuguesa
- 2010–2013: Audax
- 2013–2016: Coritiba

Senior career*
| Years | Team | Apps | (Gls) |
| 2016 | Coritiba | 24 | (3) |
| 2017– | Palmeiras | 384 | (109) |
| 2018 | → Atlético Paranaense (loan) | 48 | (9) |
| 2026– | → América (loan) | 20 | (3) |

International career^{‡}
| 2023 | Brazil | 6 | (0) |
- * Club domestic league appearances and goals as of 5 March 2026 ‡ National team caps and goals as of 21 November 2023

Raphael Cavalcante Veiga (born 19 June 1995) is a Brazilian professional footballer who plays as an attacking midfielder for Liga MX club América, on loan from Brazilian Série A and Campeonato Paulista club Palmeiras.

== Club career ==
=== Coritiba ===
Born in São Paulo, Veiga represented Portuguesa and Audax as a youth before joining Coritiba in September 2013. He spent two years in the youth setup before being promoted to the main squad in February 2016.

Veiga made his professional debut on 10 March 2016, coming on as a second-half substitute for Thiago Lopes in a 3–0 Primeira Liga home win against Avaí. He made his Série A debut on 23 July, starting in a 1–0 away win against Santa Cruz.

Veiga scored his first goal as a senior on 3 August 2016, in a 1–3 loss at Vitória.

=== Palmeiras ===
In December 2016, Veiga was transferred to Palmeiras, signing a five-year contract. He made his debut for the club the following month in a friendly match against Chapecoense. In his first season, Veiga played in 22 matches and scored two goals.

==== Loan to Atlético Paranaense ====
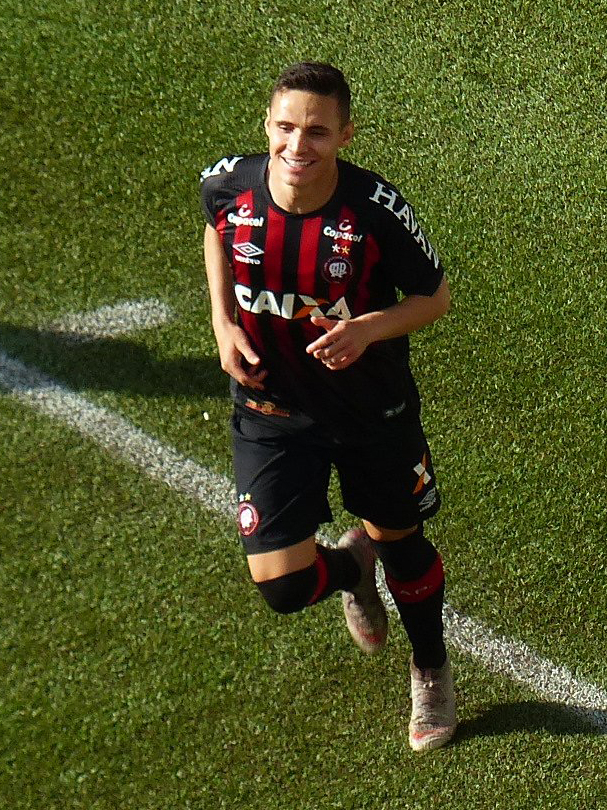
Veiga in action for Atlético Paranaense in 2018

On 2 January 2018, after being sparingly used by Verdão, Veiga moved to Atlético Paranaense on a one-year loan deal. While on loan, he became a regular starter, and scored seven goals as the club finished seventh; he was also an important unit in the 2018 Copa Sudamericana, as Furacão ended up champions.

==== Breakthrough ====
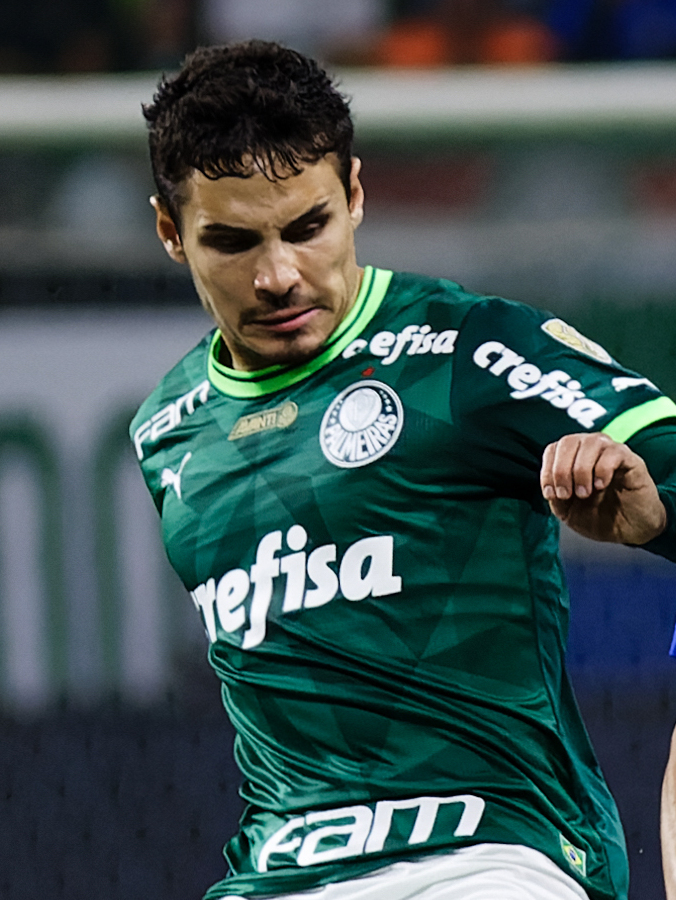
Veiga playing for Palmeiras in 2023

Upon his return to Palmeiras, he initially struggled for playing time. His fortunes shifted dramatically in 2020 under managers Vanderlei Luxemburgo and Abel Ferreira, he became a key goal scorer in decisive matches and an integral figure in the club's trophy-laden campaign, which culminated in Copa Libertadores glory.

Between 2021 and 2022, Veiga delivered standout performances in major finals, such as the Copa Libertadores against Flamengo, the FIFA Club World Cup against Chelsea, and the Recopa Sudamericana against Athletico Paranaense. He also became the club’s top scorer in the Libertadores and captained the team for the first time. A serious ankle injury in 2022 temporarily interrupted his progress, but he returned in 2023 to play a central role in further triumphs, including the Supercopa do Brasil.

In 2024, Veiga reached significant milestones: surpassing 100 career goals, becoming Palmeiras’ leading scorer of the 21st century alongside Dudu, and completing 300 appearances for the club. Later that year, he scored his 100th goal for Palmeiras.

The 2025 season brought challenges, with a dip in form and more time spent as a substitute. Despite this, he contributed decisive goals in the Copa Libertadores semifinal against LDU, helping the team overturn a first-leg deficit and advance to the final.

==== Loan to América ====
In February 2026, Veiga joined Club América in Mexico's top division on a one-year loan. In October, he suffered an injury that ruled him out for the remainder of the tournament, effectively bringing his time in Mexico to an end.

== International career ==
Veiga received his first call-up to the Brazil national team in March 2023 for a friendly match away against Morocco. Veiga was subbed on in the 65th minute in a 2–1 loss.

Veiga was called up again in June 2023, where he was used as a sub in both of the Seleção's matches during that international break, during a 4-1 against Guinea and a 4-2 loss against Senegal, both being friendly matches.

In September 2023, Veiga was included in Brazil's squad for their matches against Bolivia and Peru in the CONMEBOL 2026 World Cup qualifying matches. He was an unused sub during Brazil's 5-1 victory over Bolivia, but was subbed on in stoppage time in their match against Peru, which Brazil won 1-0.

== Career statistics ==
=== Club ===
As of match played on 21 August 2026

| Club | Season | League | | | State league (Note: Includes Campeonato Paranaense, Campeonato Paulista) | | Copa do Brasil | | Continental | | Other | | Total | |
| Club | Season | Division | Apps | Goals | Apps | Goals | Apps | Goals | Apps | Goals | Apps | Goals | Apps | Goals |
|---|---|---|---|---|---|---|---|---|---|---|---|---|---|---|
| Coritiba | 2016 | Série A | 19 | 3 | 0 | 0 | 1 | 0 | — | | 1 (Note: Appearance in Primeira Liga) | 0 | 21 | 3 |
| Palmeiras | 2017 | Série A | 11 | 0 | 7 | 1 | 1 | 0 | 1 (Note: Appearance(s) in Copa Libertadores) | 0 | — | | 20 | 1 |
| Palmeiras | 2019 | Série A | 19 | 3 | 4 | 1 | 1 | 0 | 6 | 1 | — | | 30 | 5 |
| Palmeiras | 2020 | Série A | 26 | 11 | 9 | 1 | 8 | 4 | 10 | 2 | 2 (Note: Appearances in FIFA Club World Cup) | 0 | 55 | 18 |
| Palmeiras | 2021 | Série A | 31 | 10 | 4 | 0 | 2 | 0 | 12 | 5 | 3 (Note: One appearance and two goals in Supercopa do Brasil, two appearances and one goal in Recopa Sudamericana) | 3 | 52 | 18 |
| Palmeiras | 2022 | Série A | 19 | 3 | 13 | 7 | 3 | 2 | 9 | 6 | 4 | 3 | 48 | 21 |
| Palmeiras | 2023 | Série A | 31 | 9 | 14 | 3 | 4 | 1 | 10 | 3 | 1 (Note: Appearance in Supercopa do Brasil) | 2 | 60 | 18 |
| Palmeiras | 2024 | Série A | 34 | 11 | 12 | 7 | 4 | 0 | 7 | 2 | 1 | 0 | 58 | 20 |
| Palmeiras | 2025 | Série A | 25 | 2 | 14 | 2 | 1 | 0 | 9 | 3 | 4 | 0 | 53 | 7 |
| Palmeiras | 2026 | Série A | 0 | 0 | 3 | 0 | 0 | 0 | 0 | 0 | 0 | 0 | 3 | 0 |
| Palmeiras | Total | | 196 | 49 | 80 | 22 | 24 | 7 | 64 | 22 | 20 | 9 | 384 | 109 |
| Atlético Paranaense (loan) | 2018 | Série A | 31 | 7 | — | | 7 | 0 | 10 (Note: Appearance(s) in Copa Sudamericana) | 2 | — | | 48 | 9 |
| América (loan) | 2025–26 | Liga MX | 15 | 2 | — | | — | | 5 (Note: Appearance(s) in CONCACAF Champions Cup) | 1 | — | | 20 | 3 |
| América (loan) | 2026–27 | Liga MX | 5 | 1 | — | | — | | 0 | 0 | 3 (Note: Appearances in Leagues Cup) | 0 | 8 | 1 |
| América (loan) | Total | | 20 | 3 | — | | — | | 5 | 1 | 3 | 0 | 28 | 4 |
| Career total | | | 266 | 62 | 80 | 22 | 32 | 7 | 79 | 25 | 24 | 9 | 481 | 125 |

== Honours ==
=== Club ===
Palmeiras

- Copa Libertadores: 2020, 2021
- Campeonato Brasileiro Série A: 2022, 2023
- Copa do Brasil: 2020
- Campeonato Paulista: 2020, 2022, 2023, 2024, 2026
- Recopa Sudamericana: 2022
- Supercopa do Brasil: 2023

Atlético Paranaense

- Copa Sudamericana: 2018

=== Individual ===
- Copa do Brasil Golden Ball: 2020
- Copa do Brasil Team of the final: 2020
- Copa Libertadores Team of the Year: 2021
- Campeonato Brasileiro Série A Team of the Year: 2021
- Troféu Mesa Redonda Team of the Year: 2021, 2023, 2024
- Bola de Prata: 2021, 2023
- South American Team of the Year: 2021
- Man of the Match the 2021 FIFA Club World Cup: Palmeiras 2x0 Al Ahly
- Campeonato Paulista Team of the Year: 2022, 2023
- Man of the Match the Supercopa do Brasil: 2023
- Campeonato Paulista Best Player: 2023
