= 2024 Campeonato Paulista =

Campeonato Paulista - Série A1
- Season: 2024
- Dates: 20 January – 7 April 2024
- Champions: Palmeiras
- Relegated: Ituano; Santo André
- Copa do Brasil: Red Bull Bragantino; Novorizontino; Inter de Limeira; Ponte Preta; Portuguesa
- Série D: Inter de Limeira; Portuguesa; Água Santa
- Matches: 104
- Goals: 230 (2.21 per match)
- Top goalscorer: José Manuel López (10 goals)

The 2024 Campeonato Paulista de Futebol Profissional da Primeira Divisão - Série A1 was the 123rd season of São Paulo's top professional football league. The competition was played from 20 January to 7 April 2024.

== Format ==
- In the first stage the sixteen seeded teams were drawn into four groups of four teams each, with each team playing once against the twelve clubs from the other three groups. After each team has played twelve matches, the top two teams of each group qualified for the quarter-final stage.
- After the completion of the first stage, the two clubs with the lowest number of points, regardless of the group, were relegated to the Campeonato Paulista Série A2.
- Quarter-finals and semi-finals were played in a single match, with the best placed team playing at home.
- The finals were played in a two-legged home and away fixture, with the best placed team playing the second leg at home.
- In case of a draw in any knockout stage, the match was decided by a penalty shoot-out.
- The two highest-placed teams not otherwise qualified qualified for the 2025 Copa do Brasil.
- The top three highest-placed teams in the general table at the end of the competition who are not playing in any level of the national Brazilian football league system qualified for the 2025 Campeonato Brasileiro Série D.

=== Tiebreakers ===
The teams are ranked according to points (3 points for a win, 1 point for a draw, 0 points for a loss). If two or more teams are equal on points on completion of the group matches, the following criteria are applied to determine the rankings:

1. Higher number of wins;
2. Superior goal difference;
3. Higher number of goals scored;
4. Fewest red cards received;
5. Fewest yellow cards received;
6. Draw in the headquarters of the FPF.

== TV partners ==
The broadcasting rights of the 2024 Campeonato Paulista were acquired by Record TV for the third consecutive year, with their streaming app Play Plus also transmitting the matches live. Aside of that, the streaming platforms HBO Max and Estádio TNT Sports (owned by TNT) and the Paulistão official YouTube channel and app (Paulistão Play) also broadcast the matches live.

== Teams ==
Location of teams in 2024 Campeonato Paulista

Club	Home city	Head coach	2023 result
Água Santa	Diadema	(Brazil) Bruno Pivetti	2nd
Botafogo	Ribeirão Preto	(Portugal) Paulo Gomes	8th
Corinthians	São Paulo (Itaquera)	(Portugal) António Oliveira	7th
Guarani	Campinas	(Brazil) Claudinei Oliveira	10th
Internacional de Limeira	Limeira	(Brazil) Júnior Rocha	13th
Ituano	Itu	(Brazil) Alberto Valentim	4th
Mirassol	Mirassol	(Brazil) Mozart	9th
Novorizontino	Novo Horizonte	(Brazil) Eduardo Baptista	2nd (Série A2)
Palmeiras	São Paulo (Barra Funda)	(Portugal) Abel Ferreira	1st
Ponte Preta	Campinas	(Brazil) João Brigatti	1st (Série A2)
Portuguesa	São Paulo (Pari)	(Brazil) Pintado	14th
Red Bull Bragantino	Bragança Paulista	(Portugal) Pedro Caixinha	3rd
Santo André	Santo André	(Brazil) Márcio Fernandes	11th
Santos	Santos	(Brazil) Fábio Carille	12th
São Bernardo	São Bernardo do Campo	(Brazil) Márcio Zanardi	5th
São Paulo	São Paulo (Morumbi)	(Brazil) Thiago Carpini	6th

== First stage ==
=== Group A ===
Pos	Team	Pld	W	D	L	GF	GA	GD	Pts	Qualification
1	Santos	12	8	1	3	18	10	+8	25	Knockout stage
2	Portuguesa	12	3	1	8	8	17	−9	10	Knockout stage
3	Santo André (R)	12	1	5	6	8	17	−9	8	Relegation to Série A2
4	Ituano (R)	12	1	3	8	5	19	−14	6	Relegation to Série A2

Source: Soccerway
(R) Relegated

=== Group B ===
Pos	Team	Pld	W	D	L	GF	GA	GD	Pts	Qualification
1	Palmeiras	12	8	4	0	20	9	+11	28	Knockout stage
2	Ponte Preta	12	4	5	3	15	11	+4	17	Knockout stage
3	Água Santa	12	4	3	5	8	11	−3	15	
4	Guarani	12	2	4	6	10	14	−4	10	

Source: Soccerway

=== Group C ===
Pos	Team	Pld	W	D	L	GF	GA	GD	Pts	Qualification
1	Red Bull Bragantino	12	6	3	3	13	9	+4	21	Knockout stage
2	Inter de Limeira	12	5	2	5	17	15	+2	17	Knockout stage
3	Corinthians	12	4	2	6	14	14	0	14	
4	Mirassol	12	3	5	4	17	17	0	14	

Source: Soccerway

=== Group D ===
Pos	Team	Pld	W	D	L	GF	GA	GD	Pts	Qualification
1	São Paulo	12	6	4	2	20	12	+8	22	Knockout stage
2	Novorizontino	12	6	4	2	16	10	+6	22	Knockout stage
3	São Bernardo	12	6	3	3	14	9	+5	21	
4	Botafogo-SP	12	3	3	6	8	16	−8	12	

Source: Soccerway

== Knockout stage ==
The knockout stage of the 2024 Campeonato Paulista began on 16 March 2024 with the quarter-finals and ended on 7 April 2024 with the final. A total of eight teams will compete in the knockout stage.

=== Round dates ===
Round	First leg	Second leg
Quarter-finals	16–17 March 2024	–
Semi-finals	27–28 March 2024	–
Finals	31 March 2024	7 April 2024

=== Format ===
The quarter-finals will be played in a single match at the stadium of the better-ranked team in the first phase. If the match ends in a draw, the tie will be decided via a penalty shoot-out. The semi-finals will be played with the same format as the quarter-finals. The finals will be played over two legs, with the team having the better record in matches from the previous stages hosting the second leg.

=== Qualified teams ===
Group	Winners	Runners-up
A	Santos	Portuguesa
B	Palmeiras	Ponte Preta
C	Red Bull Bragantino	Inter de Limeira
D	São Paulo	Novorizontino

=== Bracket ===
Quarterfinals
B1	Palmeiras	5
B2	Ponte Preta	1
D1	São Paulo	1 (4)
D2	Novorizontino	1 (5)
A1	Santos	0 (4)
A2	Portuguesa	0 (2)
C1	Red Bull Bragantino	3
C2	Inter de Limeira	0

Semifinals
B1	Palmeiras	1
D2	Novorizontino	0
A1	Santos	3
C1	Red Bull Bragantino	1

Finals
B1	Palmeiras	0	2	2
A1	Santos	1	0	1

=== Quarter-finals ===
Team 1	Score	Team 2
Palmeiras	5−1	Ponte Preta
Red Bull Bragantino	3−0	Inter de Limeira
São Paulo	1−1 (4–5 p)	Novorizontino
Santos	0−0 (4–2 p)	Portuguesa

16 March 2024
18:00 UTC-03:00

Palmeiras	5–1	Ponte Preta
López 3', 19', 70'; Murilo 38'; Piquerez 66'	Report	Renato 90'

Arena Barueri, Barueri
Attendance: 18,119
Referee: Luiz Flávio de Oliveira

17 March 2024
16:00 UTC-03:00

Red Bull Bragantino	3–0	Inter de Limeira
Thiago Borbas 40', 58'; Vitinho 61'	Report

Estádio Nabi Abi Chedid, Bragança Paulista
Attendance: 5,386
Referee: Edina Alves Batista

17 March 2024
18:00 UTC-03:00

São Paulo	1–1	Novorizontino
Ferreira 23'	Report	Rômulo 12'
Penalties
Lucas Moura (penalty scored); Luciano (penalty scored); Pablo Maia (penalty scored); Michel Araújo (penalty missed); Igor Vinícius (penalty scored); Diego Costa (penalty missed)	4–5	(penalty missed) Lucca; (penalty scored) Danilo Barcelos; (penalty scored) Fabrício Daniel; (penalty scored) Chico; (penalty scored) Marlon; (penalty scored) Renato Palm

Morumbi, São Paulo
Attendance: 55,197
Referee: Flávio Rodrigues de Souza

17 March 2024
20:15 UTC-03:00

Santos	0–0	Portuguesa
	Report
Penalties
Giuliano (penalty scored); Guilherme (penalty scored); Rincón (penalty scored); Jair (penalty scored)	4–2	(penalty scored) Eduardo Diniz; (penalty missed) Felipe Marques; (penalty missed) Quintana; (penalty scored) Luccas Paraizo

Vila Belmiro, Santos
Attendance: 13,882
Referee: Raphael Claus

=== Semi-finals ===
Team 1	Score	Team 2
Santos	3–1	Red Bull Bragantino
Palmeiras	1–0	Novorizontino

27 March 2024
20:30 UTC-03:00

Santos	3–1	Red Bull Bragantino
Joaquim 8'; Guilherme 45+1'; Giuliano 63'	Report	Eduardo Sasha 51'

Neo Química Arena, São Paulo
Attendance: 44,804
Referee: Matheus Delgado Candançan

28 March 2024
21:35 UTC-03:00

Palmeiras	1–0	Novorizontino
Endrick 53'	Report

Allianz Parque, São Paulo
Attendance: 40,448
Referee: Edina Alves Batista

=== Finals ===
Team 1	Agg.	Team 2	1st leg	2nd leg
Palmeiras	2–1	Santos	0–1	2–0

==== First leg ====
31 March 2024
18:00 UTC-03:00

Santos	1–0	Palmeiras
Otero 48'	Report

Vila Belmiro, Santos
Attendance: 15,946
Referee: Flávio Rodrigues de Souza

Santos	Palmeiras

GK	1	(Brazil) João Paulo
RB	4	(Brazil) JP Chermont		(substituted off) 83'
CB	6	(Brazil) Joaquim
CB	2	(Brazil) Gil
LB	3	(Brazil) Felipe Jonatan
DM	5	(Brazil) João Schmidt	(yellow card) 52'	(substituted off) 83'
DM	8	(Brazil) Diego Pituca (c)
AM	10	(Brazil) Giuliano		(substituted off) 70'
RW	7	(Venezuela) Rómulo Otero		(substituted off) 70'
ST	9	(Argentina) Julio Furch		(substituted off) 37'
LW	11	(Brazil) Guiherme
Substitutes:
GK	12	(Brazil) Gabriel Brazão
DF	13	(Brazil) Messias
DF	14	(Brazil) Jair
DF	15	(Brazil) Aderlan	(yellow card) 90+3'	(substituted on) 83'
MF	16	(Brazil) Nonato
DF	17	(Brazil) Dodô
MF	18	(Venezuela) Tomás Rincón		(substituted on) 83'
MF	19	(Ecuador) Juan Cazares		(substituted on) 70'
FW	20	(Colombia) Alfredo Morelos	(yellow card) 90+1'	(substituted on) 37'
MF	21	(Brazil) Hyan
FW	22	(Brazil) Pedrinho		(substituted on) 70'
FW	23	(Brazil) Weslley Patati
Head coach:
(Brazil) Fábio Carille

GK	21	(Brazil) Weverton
CB	2	(Brazil) Marcos Rocha (c)
CB	13	(Brazil) Luan
CB	26	(Brazil) Murilo
RWB	12	(Brazil) Mayke		(substituted off) 85'
DM	5	(Argentina) Aníbal Moreno
DM	8	(Brazil) Zé Rafael	(yellow card) 61'	(substituted off) 65'
LWB	22	(Uruguay) Joaquín Piquerez		(substituted off) 74'
AM	23	(Brazil) Raphael Veiga
ST	9	(Brazil) Endrick		(substituted off) 65'
ST	42	(Argentina) Flaco López		(substituted off) 65'
Substitutes:
GK	14	(Brazil) Marcelo Lomba
DF	6	(Brazil) Vanderlan		(substituted on) 74'
FW	10	(Brazil) Rony		(substituted on) 65'
DF	15	(Paraguay) Gustavo Gómez
FW	16	(Brazil) Caio Paulista
MF	17	(Brazil) Lázaro		(substituted on) 65'
FW	19	(Brazil) Breno Lopes
MF	25	(Brazil) Gabriel Menino
MF	27	(Colombia) Richard Ríos		(substituted on) 65'
FW	31	(Brazil) Luis Guilherme
DF	34	(Brazil) Kaiky Naves
FW	41	(Brazil) Estêvão	(yellow card) 90+2'	(substituted on) 85'
Head coach:
(Portugal) Abel Ferreira

Man of the match:
Rómulo Otero (Santos)
Assistant referees:
Marcelo Carvalho Van Gasse
Fabrini Bevilaqua Costa
Fourth official:
Lucas Canetto Bellote
Video assistant referee:
Daiane Muniz dos Santos
Assistant video assistant referees:
José Claudio Rocha Filho
Adriano de Assis Miranda

Match rules

- 90 minutes
- Twelve named substitutes
- Maximum of five substitutions

==== Second leg ====
7 April 2024
18:00 UTC-03:00

Palmeiras	2–0	Santos
Raphael Veiga 33' (pen.); Moreno 67'	Report

Allianz Parque, São Paulo
Attendance: 41,446
Referee: Raphael Claus

Palmeiras	Santos

GK	21	(Brazil) Weverton
RB	12	(Brazil) Mayke	(yellow card) 90+2'
CB	15	(Paraguay) Gustavo Gómez (c)		(substituted off) 71'
CB	26	(Brazil) Murilo
LB	22	(Uruguay) Joaquín Piquerez
DM	5	(Argentina) Aníbal Moreno
DM	8	(Brazil) Zé Rafael	(yellow card) 41'	(substituted off) 46'
AM	23	(Brazil) Raphael Veiga
RW	9	(Brazil) Endrick		(substituted off) 71'
ST	42	(Argentina) Flaco López		(substituted off) 83'
LW	17	(Brazil) Lázaro		(substituted off) 65'
Substitutes:
GK	14	(Brazil) Marcelo Lomba
DF	2	(Brazil) Marcos Rocha		(substituted on) 71'
DF	6	(Brazil) Vanderlan
FW	10	(Brazil) Rony		(substituted on) 83'
DF	13	(Brazil) Luan		(substituted on) 71'
FW	16	(Brazil) Caio Paulista
FW	19	(Brazil) Breno Lopes
MF	25	(Brazil) Gabriel Menino
MF	27	(Colombia) Richard Ríos		(substituted on) 46'
FW	31	(Brazil) Luis Guilherme		(substituted on) 65'
MF	35	(Brazil) Fabinho
FW	41	(Brazil) Estêvão
Head coach:
(Portugal) Abel Ferreira

GK	1	(Brazil) João Paulo
RB	4	(Brazil) Aderlan	(yellow card) 58'	(substituted off) 65'
CB	6	(Brazil) Joaquim
CB	2	(Brazil) Gil	(yellow card) 60'
LB	3	(Brazil) Felipe Jonatan		(substituted off) 64'
DM	5	(Brazil) João Schmidt
DM	8	(Brazil) Diego Pituca (c)		(substituted off) 86'
AM	10	(Brazil) Giuliano
RW	7	(Venezuela) Rómulo Otero		(substituted off) 74'
ST	9	(Colombia) Alfredo Morelos	(yellow card) 61'	(substituted off) 64'
LW	11	(Brazil) Guiherme
Substitutes:
GK	12	(Brazil) Diógenes
GK	21	(Brazil) Gabriel Brazão
DF	13	(Brazil) Messias
DF	14	(Brazil) Jair
DF	15	(Brazil) JP Chermont		(substituted on) 65'
MF	16	(Brazil) Nonato
DF	17	(Brazil) Hayner		(substituted on) 64'
MF	18	(Venezuela) Tomás Rincón
MF	19	(Ecuador) Juan Cazares
FW	20	(Argentina) Julio Furch		(substituted on) 64'
FW	22	(Brazil) Pedrinho		(substituted on) 74'
FW	23	(Brazil) Weslley Patati		(substituted on) 86'
Head coach:
(Brazil) Fábio Carille

Man of the match:
Endrick (Palmeiras)
Assistant referees:
Danilo Ricardo Simon Manis
Neuza Ines Back
Fourth official:
Edina Alves Batista
Video assistant referee:
Rodrigo Guarizo Ferreira do Amaral
Assistant video assistant referees:
Marcio Henrique de Gois
Vitor Carmona Metestaine

Match rules

- 90 minutes
- Twelve named substitutes
- Maximum of five substitutions

== Overall table ==
Pos	Team	Pld	W	D	L	GF	GA	GD	Pts	Qualification or relegation
1	Palmeiras (C)	16	11	4	1	28	11	+17	37	Finalists
2	Santos	16	10	2	4	22	13	+9	32	Finalists
3	Red Bull Bragantino	14	7	3	4	17	12	+5	24	Eliminated in the Semi-finals
4	Novorizontino	14	6	5	3	17	12	+5	23	Eliminated in the Semi-finals
5	São Paulo	13	6	5	2	21	13	+8	23	Eliminated in the Quarter-finals
6	Inter de Limeira	13	5	2	6	17	18	−1	17	Eliminated in the Quarter-finals
7	Ponte Preta	13	4	5	4	16	16	0	17	Eliminated in the Quarter-finals
8	Portuguesa	13	3	2	8	8	17	−9	11	Eliminated in the Quarter-finals
9	São Bernardo	12	6	3	3	14	9	+5	21	
10	Água Santa	12	4	3	5	8	11	−3	15	
11	Corinthians	12	4	2	6	14	14	0	14	
12	Mirassol	12	3	5	4	17	17	0	14	
13	Botafogo	12	3	3	6	8	16	−8	12	
14	Guarani	12	2	4	6	10	14	−4	10	
15	Santo André (R)	12	1	5	6	8	17	−9	8	Relegation to Série A2
16	Ituano (R)	12	1	3	8	5	19	−14	6	Relegation to Série A2

Source: ge
Rules for classification: 1st points; 2nd wins; 3rd goal difference; 4th goals scored; 5th head-to-head results; 6th least red cards received; 7th least yellow cards received; 8th draw.
(C) Champions; (R) Relegated

== Awards ==
=== Team of the Year ===
Pos.	Player	Club
GK	(Brazil) João Paulo	Santos
DF	(Brazil) Hayner	Santos
DF	(Brazil) Joaquim	Santos
DF	(Brazil) Murilo	Palmeiras
DF	(Brazil) Juninho Capixaba	Red Bull Bragantino
MF	(Brazil) João Schmidt	Santos
MF	(Brazil) Diego Pituca	Santos
MF	(Brazil) Rômulo	Novorizontino
FW	(Brazil) Endrick	Palmeiras
FW	(Argentina) José Manuel López	Palmeiras
FW	(Brazil) Guilherme	Santos
Head coach	(Portugal) Abel Ferreira	Palmeiras

Player of the Year

The Player of the Year was awarded to Endrick of Palmeiras.

Breakthrough Player of the Year

The Breakthrough Player of the Year was awarded to Rômulo of Novorizontino.

== Top scorers ==
Rank	Player	Team	Goals
1	(Argentina) José Manuel López	Palmeiras	10
2	(Brazil) Dellatorre	Mirassol	7
2	(Brazil) Raphael Veiga	Palmeiras	7
4	(Brazil) Eduardo Sasha	Red Bull Bragantino	5
4	(Brazil) Yuri Alberto	Corinthians	5
