= José Manuel López (footballer) =

Argentine footballer (born 2000)

Flaco Lopez
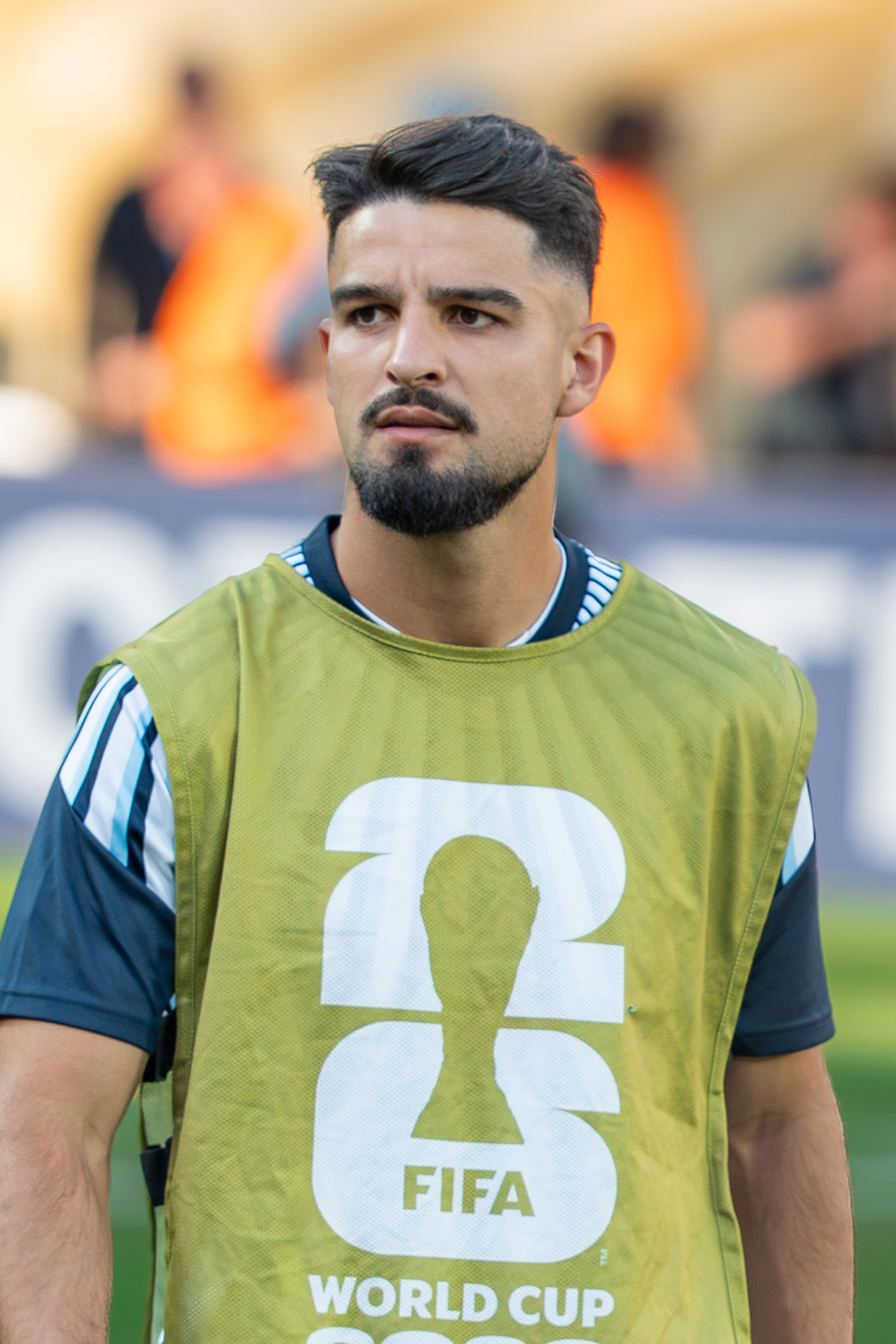
- López with Argentina in 2026

Personal information
- Full name: José Manuel Alberto López
- Date of birth: 6 December 2000 (age 25)
- Place of birth: San Lorenzo, Argentina
- Height: 1.90 m (6 ft 3 in)
- Position: Striker

Team information
- Current team: Palmeiras
- Number: 42

Youth career
- Club El Progreso
- Boca Juniors
- 2010–2017: Independiente
- 2017–2019: Lanús

Senior career*
Years	Team	Apps	(Gls)
2019–2022	Lanús	37	(18)
2022–	Palmeiras	176	(60)

International career^{‡}
2025–	Argentina	8	(1)
Medal record
Men's football
Representing Argentina
FIFA World Cup
Runner-up	2026 Canada–Mexico–US
- * Club domestic league appearances and goals as of 5 November 2026 ‡ National team caps and goals as of 30 September 2026

José Manuel Alberto López (born 6 December 2000), also known as Flaco López, is an Argentine professional footballer who plays as a striker for Campeonato Brasileiro Série A club Palmeiras and the Argentina national team.

== Club career ==
López started his career at the age of seven with Club El Progreso in Saladas. Six months later, soon before a trial in front of their scouts, the player was signed by Boca Juniors. At the age of nine, López joined Independiente; remaining until 2016, he notably trained with Ariel Holan's first-team squad at one point. 2017 saw López head to Lanús, initially featuring at youth level before being called up mid-season ahead of the 2018–19 Primera División resumption. However, in that period, López was loaned to Liga Tresarroyense side Colegiales de Tres Arroyos in 2019. He finished his stint there as the club's top scorer.

López was promoted into Luis Zubeldía's senior squad in late-2020, appearing on the substitute's bench for Copa de la Liga Profesional encounters with Aldosivi and Defensa y Justicia. López, in the aforementioned competition, made his professional debut on 3 January 2021 during a draw on the road against Patronato, after he was substituted on in place of Gonzalo Torres with twenty-five minutes left. On his second appearance, López scored his first goal during a win over Rosario Central on 9 January.

== International career ==
In August 2025, López received his first call-up for the senior Argentina side by manager Lionel Scaloni for the matches against Venezuela and Ecuador on September 4 and September 9 respectively. He made his debut for the national team on 14 October when he started in a 6–0 friendly win over Puerto Rico.

On 27 May 2026, López was selected in the 26-man squad for the 2026 FIFA World Cup.

== Career statistics ==
=== Club ===
As of match played 8 November 2026

Appearances and goals by club, season and competition
Club	Season	League			State league (Note: Includes Campeonato Paulista)		National cup (Note: Includes Copa Argentina, Copa do Brasil)		South america		Other		Total	
Club	Season	Division	Apps	Goals	Apps	Goals	Apps	Goals	Apps	Goals	Apps	Goals	Apps	Goals
Lanús	2020–21	Argentine Primera División	2	1	—		1	0	—		—		3	1
Lanús	2021	Argentine Primera División	32	13	—		0	0	5 (Note: Appearances in Copa Sudamericana)	1	—		37	14
Lanús	2022	Argentine Primera División	13	4	—		1	3	5	0	—		19	7
Lanús	Total		37	18	—		2	3	10	1	—		59	22
Palmeiras	2022	Série A	12	2	—		0	0	2 (Note: Appearances in Copa Libertadores)	0	—		14	2
Palmeiras	2023	Série A	22	5	6	1	5	1	7	1	0	0	40	8
Palmeiras	2024	Série A	35	10	15	10	2	0	8	2	1 (Note: Appearance in Supercopa do Brasil)	0	61	22
Palmeiras	2025	Série A	33	12	12	4	3	1	12	7	4 (Note: Appearances in FIFA Club World Cup)	1	64	25
Palmeiras	2026	Série A	31	10	11	6	7	4	12	4	—		61	24
Palmeiras	Total		132	39	44	21	17	6	41	14	5	1	240	81
Career total			169	57	44	21	19	9	51	15	5	1	299	103

=== International ===
As of match played 30 September 2026

Appearances and goals by national team and year
National team	Year	Apps	Goals
Argentina	2025	2	0
Argentina	2026	6	1
Total		8	1

As of match played 30 September 2026
Scores and results list Argentina's goal tally first, score column indicates score after each López goal.

List of international goals scored by José Manuel López
No.	Date	Venue	Opponent	Score	Result	Competition
1	30 September 2026	Estadio Mario Alberto Kempes, Córdoba, Argentina	Bolivia	4–0	4–0	Friendly

== Honours ==
Palmeiras

- Campeonato Brasileiro Série A: 2022, 2023
- Supercopa do Brasil: 2023
- Campeonato Paulista: 2023, 2024, 2026
- Copa Libertadores runner-up: 2025

Argentina

- FIFA World Cup runner-up: 2026

Individual

- Campeonato Paulista Top scorer: 2024 (10 goals)
- Campeonato Paulista Team of the Year: 2024, 2026
- Troféu Mesa Redonda Team of the Year: 2025
- Copa Libertadores Team of the year: 2025
- Copa Libertadores Top Scorer: 2025 (7 goals)
- South America Team of the Year: 2025
- Campeonato Paulista Best Player: 2026
