= Fabinho (footballer, born 2002) =

Brazilian footballer

Personal information
- Full name: Fábio Silva de Freitas
- Date of birth: 9 April 2002 (age 24)
- Place of birth: Natal, Brazil
- Height: 1.78 m (5 ft 10 in)
- Position: Defensive midfielder

Team information
- Current team: Red Bull Bragantino
- Number: 5

Youth career
- –2021: Palmeiras

Senior career*
| Years | Team | Apps | (Gls) |
| 2021–2025 | Palmeiras | 78 | (1) |
| 2025– | Red Bull Bragantino | 37 | (0) |

International career^{‡}
| 2018 | Brazil U16 | 4 | (1) |
| 2018–2019 | Brazil U17 | 8 | (0) |
- * Club domestic league appearances and goals as of 7 April 2026 ‡ National team caps and goals as of 25 October 2021

Fábio Silva de Freitas (born 9 April 2002), commonly known as Fabinho, is a Brazilian professional footballer who plays as a defensive midfielder for Campeonato Brasileiro Série A club Bragantino.

== Career statistics ==
=== Club ===
As of 7 December 2021.

| Club | Season | League | | | State League | | Cup | | Continental | | Other | | Total | |
| Club | Season | Division | Apps | Goals | Apps | Goals | Apps | Goals | Apps | Goals | Apps | Goals | Apps | Goals |
|---|---|---|---|---|---|---|---|---|---|---|---|---|---|---|
| Palmeiras | 2021 | Série A | 2 | 0 | 8 (Note: Appearances in the Campeonato Paulista) | 0 | 0 | 0 | 0 | 0 | 0 | 0 | 10 | 0 |
| Career total | | | 2 | 0 | 8 | 0 | 0 | 0 | 0 | 0 | 0 | 0 | 10 | 0 |

== Honours ==
Palmeiras

- Copa Libertadores: 2021
- Campeonato Brasileiro Série A: 2022, 2023
- Campeonato Paulista: 2023, 2024
