= Endrick =

Brazilian footballer (born 2006)

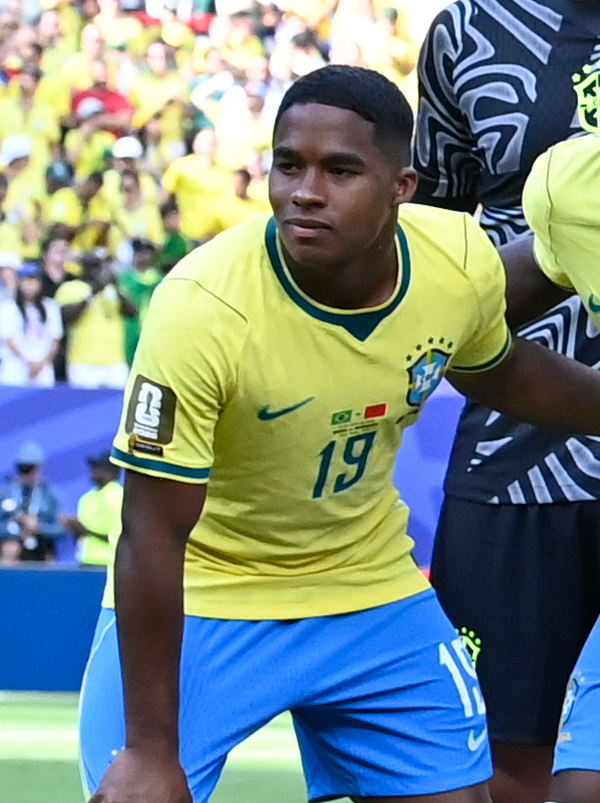
- Endrick with Brazil in 2026

Personal information
- Full name: Endrick Felipe Moreira de Sousa Pessoa
- Date of birth: 21 July 2006 (age 20)
- Place of birth: Taguatinga, Federal District, Brazil
- Height: 1.73 m (5 ft 8 in)
- Position: Striker

Team information
- Current team: Real Madrid
- Number: 9

Youth career
- 2016–2022: Palmeiras

Senior career*
Years	Team	Apps	(Gls)
2022–2024	Palmeiras	60	(15)
2024–	Real Madrid	28	(1)
2026	→ Lyon (loan)	16	(5)

International career^{‡}
2022	Brazil U17	4	(5)
2024–	Brazil U23	7	(2)
2023–	Brazil	26	(5)
- * Club domestic league appearances and goals as of 22:08, 21 November 2026 (UTC) ‡ National team caps and goals as of 12:33, 17 November 2026 (UTC)

Endrick Felipe Moreira de Sousa Pessoa (born 21 July 2006), known mononymously as Endrick (Brazilian Portuguese: [ˈẽ(j̃)dɾik(i)]), is a Brazilian professional footballer who plays as a striker for La Liga club Real Madrid and the Brazil national team.

Endrick progressed through the youth system of Palmeiras and made his senior debut for the club in 2022, becoming the youngest player to appear for their first team. He helped Palmeiras win consecutive Série A titles and established himself as one of Brazil's most highly rated young forwards before joining Real Madrid in 2024.

Endrick represented Brazil at youth level before making his senior debut for Brazil in 2023. He scored his first senior international goal against England at Wembley Stadium and later represented Brazil at the 2024 Copa América and 2026 FIFA World Cup.

== Early life ==
Endrick was born in Taguatinga, Federal District, and has one brother and two sisters. His father, Douglas de Sousa Silva Ramos, pursued a career in professional football and left his family when Endrick was eleven years old to play for several small clubs in Brasília. His mother was unemployed and homeless during that time, forcing Endrick and his siblings to reside in an orphanage in São Paulo until his father returned after six months. Both his parents worked at a cafe on the city's underground train station before his father received employment by Palmeiras as a janitor.

Endrick started playing football at the age of four, and his father published his goals on YouTube to attract interested parties among the big Brazilian clubs. Endrick vowed to become a professional footballer to help his family after his parents were unable to feed him. At the age of eight, he trained in a Real Madrid camp with his friends at Águas Claras; he grew up supporting Real Madrid and idolised Cristiano Ronaldo. He was also inspired by other Brazilians who played for Madrid such as Ronaldo, Vinícius Jr., Rodrygo and Éder Militão.

== Club career ==
=== Palmeiras ===
After nearly signing for São Paulo, Endrick joined the Palmeiras youth team at the age of 11. In the next five years, he would score 165 goals in 169 games for Palmeiras youth teams. Endrick participated in the 2022 Copa São Paulo de Futebol Júnior, where he scored eight goals in seven matches and was voted Player of the Tournament by supporters, after leading Palmeiras to their first title. Following the tournament, he caught the attention of international media and several major European clubs.

Endrick made his senior professional debut on 6 October 2022, coming on as a second-half substitute in Palmeiras' 4–0 league win over Coritiba. At the age of 16 years, two months and 16 days, he became the youngest player to appear for the Palmeiras first team. He scored his first two goals on 25 October, in a 3–1 win over Athletico Paranaense, becoming the second youngest goalscorer in the history of Brazil's Série A. Endrick then achieved his first trophy with the first team, winning the league with three games in hand following a 4–0 home win over Fortaleza on 2 November. He scored his third goal in seven appearances during the match as Palmeiras secured an eleventh league title in club history. At the end of the season, Endrick was voted the most promising player in the Série A.

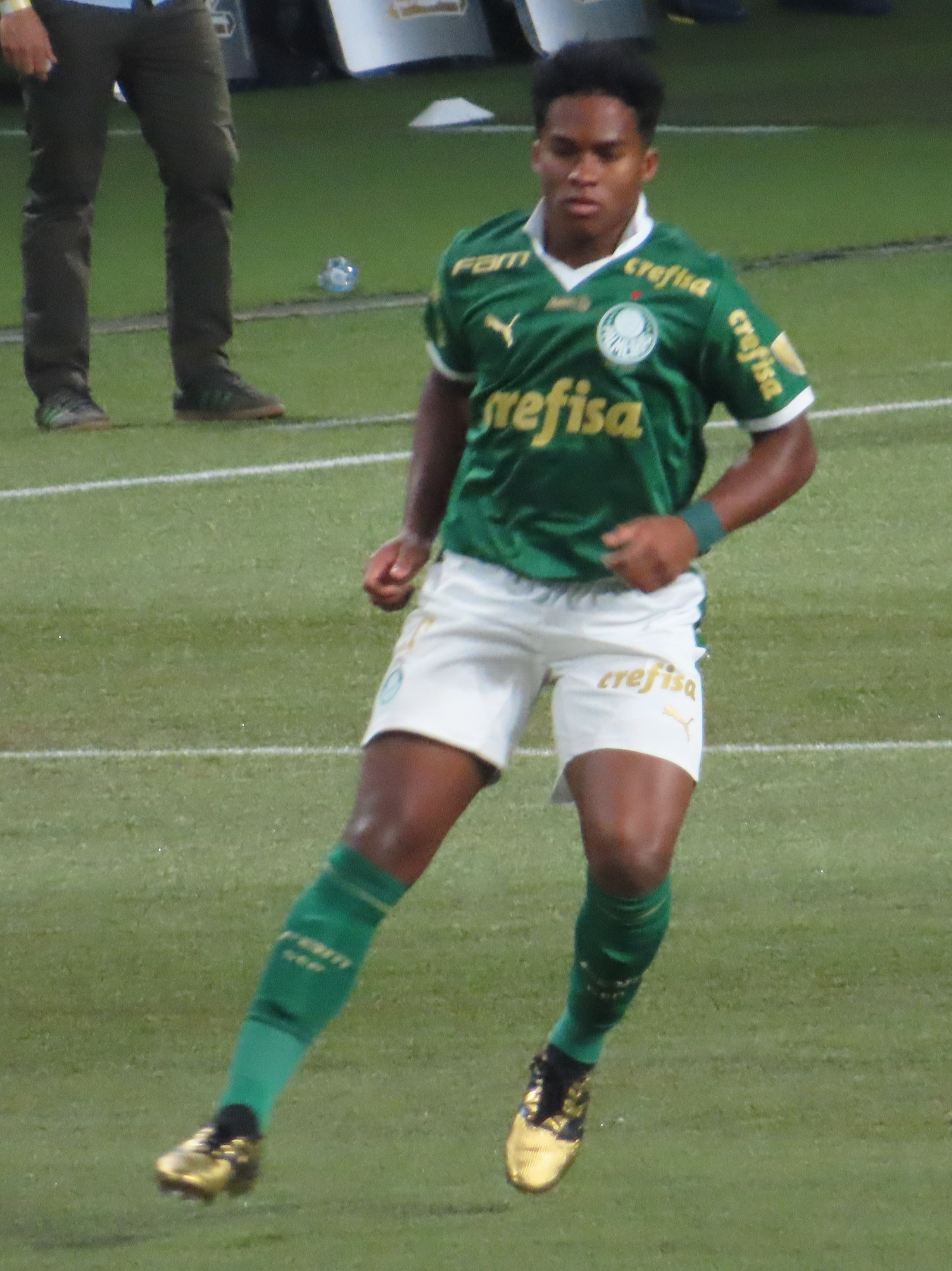
Endrick playing for Palmeiras in 2024

On 11 October 2023, Endrick was named by English newspaper The Guardian as one of the best talents born in 2006 worldwide. After experiencing an extensive goal-drought throughout the season, Endrick scored two goals and added an assist on 1 November in a 3–4 comeback win against Botafogo at the Estádio Olímpico Nilton Santos. The game was 3–0 at the end of the first half. Endrick scored early in the second half and was shown on screen telling his teammates "just pass me the ball", a phrase he'd later apologize for. With the win, Palmeiras moved three points behind Botafogo, who were then first in the table. Palmeiras won their second consecutive league title, after Endrick scored a goal in a 1–1 draw to Cruzeiro on 6 December, two points above second-place Grêmio. He finished the season with eleven goals, the second highest scored in a Serie A season by an under-18 player behind Ronaldo.

On 16 May 2024, Endrick was forced to leave the field on a stretcher due to an apparent right leg injury during Palmeiras' clash against Independiente del Valle in a Copa Libertadores group stage match, and he was subject to further medical tests.

=== Real Madrid ===
On 15 December 2022, La Liga club Real Madrid announced that they had reached an agreement with Palmeiras, Endrick, and his family to sign him in July 2024, when he turned 18. The official signing fee was undisclosed by the clubs, but was reported as an extendable three-year deal for a fixed amount of €60 million plus €12 million in taxes. However, some other sources reported the fee was fixed at €35 million, with the remaining €25 million subject to achieving specific sporting objectives.

On 19 July 2024, Real Madrid had confirmed a six-year deal with Endrick. He was unveiled as a new player on 27 July at the Santiago Bernabéu. On 25 August, Endrick made his debut in a 3–0 home win against Real Valladolid in La Liga, scoring the third goal after his introduction as a substitute in the 86th-minute. He also became the youngest foreigner to score for the club in La Liga's history (aged 18 years and 35 days) surpassing Raphaël Varane, who scored against Rayo Vallecano aged 18 years and 152 days. On 17 September, Endrick scored on his UEFA Champions League debut when he scored the final goal in 3–1 win against VfB Stuttgart in the league phase, becoming the youngest player to score for Real Madrid in the competition and also becoming the youngest Brazilian footballer to score in the competition, aged 18 years and 58 days.

On 2 April 2025, Endrick became the first player since Cristiano Ronaldo in the 2012–13 season to score five goals in a single Copa del Rey campaign for Real Madrid, later finishing as the tournament's joint second top scorer. He opened the scoring in the semi-final first leg against Real Sociedad and added his fifth with a trademark chipped finish in the return leg, helping Madrid reach the final.

On 21 May 2025, Real Madrid’s medical services diagnosed Endrick with a right hamstring-tendon injury that would keep him out for at least two months, ruling him out of the FIFA Club World Cup. In August 2025, he acquired the number 9 shirt ahead of the 2025–26 season, his new number being vacated by Kylian Mbappé changing to the number 10. On 1 November 2025, he made his first appearance under new manager Xabi Alonso, in a 4–0 win against Valencia.

==== Loan to Lyon ====
On 23 December 2025, Endrick joined Ligue 1 club Lyon on a six-month loan deal. Lyon paid a loan fee of €1 million plus half of his wages. On 11 January 2026, he made his debut, scoring a goal in a 2–1 away win over Lille in the Coupe de France. On 25 January, he scored his first goals in the league, a hat-trick in a 5–2 win over Metz.

== International career ==
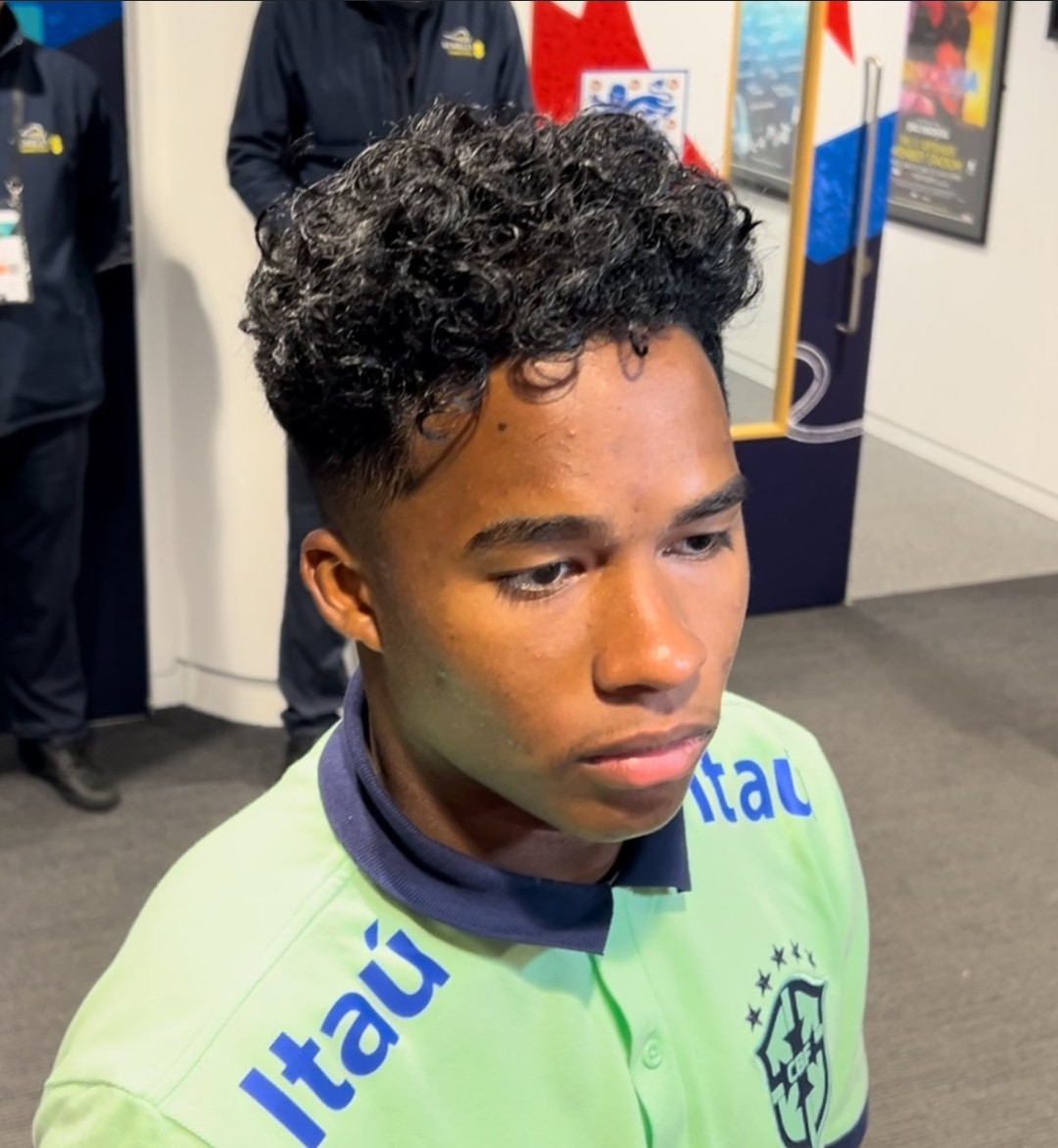
Endrick with the Brazil national team in 2024

=== Youth career ===
On 18 March 2022, Endrick was called up to the Brazilian national under-17 team to compete in the 2022 edition of the Montaigu Tournament in France. With five goals in four matches, including one against Argentina in the final, Endrick finished as the top scorer and was named best player of the tournament, as Brazil won their first Montaigu Tournament title since 1984.

Endrick was initially included in Brazil's under-20 squad for the 2023 South American Youth Championship in Colombia. However, as his club Palmeiras elected not to release him, he would ultimately not be a part of Brazil's title-winning team; Palmeiras did not want Endrick to miss the start of their pre-season, which overlapped with the tournament's January and February timeframe.

Endrick was selected for the Brazil national under-23 team in 2024. The team failed to qualify for 2024 Summer Olympics in Paris, France, with him scoring twice in seven matches in Olympic qualifying.

=== Senior career ===
Endrick was selected for the Brazil national team for the first time on 6 November 2023, to participate in the 2026 World Cup qualifiers against Colombia and Argentina. He became the youngest male player to secure a senior call-up since Ronaldo in 1994. On his debut against Colombia, he became the fourth all-time youngest player, and youngest in 57 years, to make his debut for Brazil. His side fell to a 2–1 defeat at the Estadio Metropolitano Roberto Meléndez as Colombia achieved their first qualifier victory over Brazil in their history.

Endrick scored his first goal for Brazil in a friendly against England at Wembley Stadium on 23 March 2024, making him the youngest player to score for club or country at the ground. He scored his second goal for his nation three days later in a 3–3 draw to Spain. On 10 May, he was called up for Brazil to participate in the 2024 Copa América. After three sub appearances in the group stage, he made his first start for Brazil, replacing Vinícius Júnior who was suspended, in a quarter-final defeat to Uruguay. Endrick completed one pass during the match, from kick-off, as his side lost 4–2 in the penalty shoot-out.

On 18 May 2026, Endrick was named to Brazil's 26-man squad for the 2026 FIFA World Cup. He made his first World Cup appearance on 19 June 2026 against Haiti at Philadelphia Stadium in a group stage match, replacing Matheus Cunha as a substitute.

== Personal life ==
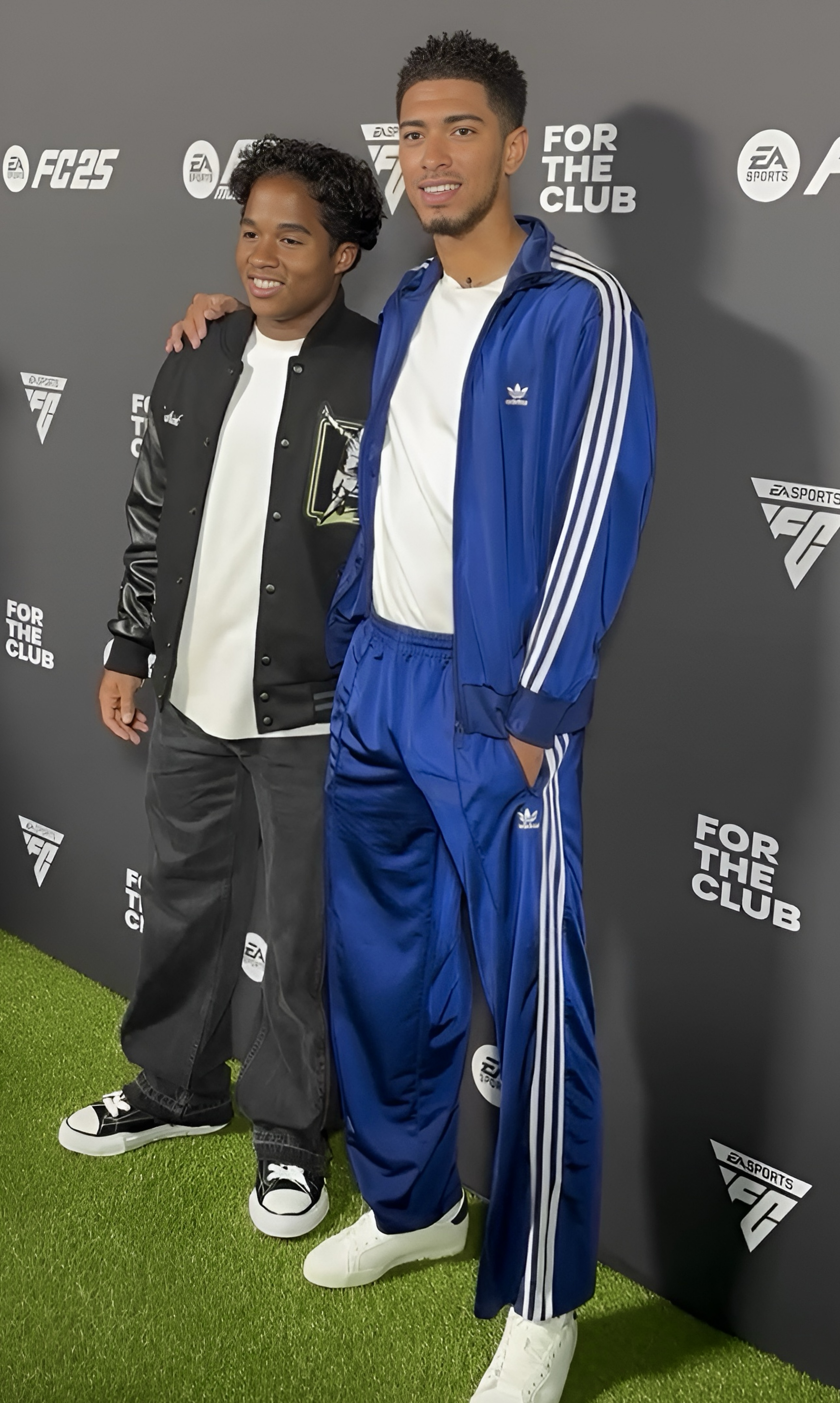
Endrick with his teammate Jude Bellingham during the EA Sports FC 25 launch event in September 2024

After scoring the winning goal for Brazil over England on 23 March 2024, Endrick revealed that he idolised the late English forward Bobby Charlton. Brazil and Real Madrid forward Rodrygo revealed on 8 September 2024 that his teammates began calling Endrick "Bobby" as a form of banter after he revealed his admiration for Charlton.

In September 2024, Endrick married model and influencer Gabriely Miranda. On 10 April 2026, they announced that they are expecting their first child, a baby boy who will be named Kendrick.

In November 2024, he became a Baptist Christian and was baptized at Lagoinha Baptist Church in Madrid.

== Style of play ==
A left-footed forward with a good shot, Endrick is considered one of Brazil's best football prospects, and has drawn comparisons with legendary Brazilian strikers Ronaldo, Pelé, and Romário. Endrick has rejected comparisons of his ability to Brazilian legends and particularly towards Pelé. When asked to describe his style of play, Endrick said, "I'll always fight. I'll be persistent and try until the last minute I'm in the game. I never give up, I pressure defenders, I run more than anyone else on the pitch." His father has stated that the footballer has been inspired by Portuguese forward Cristiano Ronaldo.

== Career statistics ==
=== Club ===
As of match played 21 November 2026

Appearances and goals by club, season and competition
Club	Season	League			State league (Note: Includes Campeonato Paulista)		National cup (Note: Includes Copa do Brasil, Copa del Rey, Coupe de France)		Continental		Other		Total	
Club	Season	Division	Apps	Goals	Apps	Goals	Apps	Goals	Apps	Goals	Apps	Goals	Apps	Goals
Palmeiras	2022	Série A	7	3	0	0	0	0	0	0	0	0	7	3
Palmeiras	2023	Série A	31	11	13	2	3	0	5 (Note: Appearances in Copa Libertadores)	1	1 (Note: Appearance in Supercopa do Brasil)	0	53	14
Palmeiras	2024	Série A	6	0	9	2	2	0	5	2	0	0	22	4
Palmeiras	Total		44	14	22	4	5	0	10	3	1	0	82	21
Real Madrid	2024–25	La Liga	22	1	—		6	5	9 (Note: Appearance(s) in UEFA Champions League)	1	0	0	37	7
Real Madrid	2025–26	La Liga	1	0	—		1	0	1	0	—		3	0
Real Madrid	2026–27	La Liga	5	0	—		0	0	3	1	0	0	8	1
Real Madrid	Total		28	1	—		7	5	13	2	0	0	48	8
Lyon (loan)	2025–26	Ligue 1	16	5	—		3	2	2 (Note: Appearances in UEFA Europa League)	1	—		21	8
Career total			87	20	22	4	15	7	25	6	1	0	150	35

=== International ===
As of match played 17 November 2026

Appearances and goals by national team and year
National team	Year	Apps	Goals
Brazil	2023	2	0
Brazil	2024	11	3
Brazil	2025	1	0
Brazil	2026	12	2
Total		26	5

Scores and results list Brazil's goal tally first, score column indicates score after each Endrick goal.

List of international goals scored by Endrick
No.	Date	Venue	Cap	Opponent	Score	Result	Competition
1	23 March 2024	Wembley Stadium, London, England	3	England	1–0	1–0	Friendly
2	26 March 2024	Santiago Bernabéu, Madrid, Spain	4	Spain	2–2	3–3	Friendly
3	8 June 2024	Kyle Field, College Station, United States	5	Mexico	3–2	3–2	Friendly
4	6 June 2026	Huntington Bank Field, Cleveland, United States	17	Egypt	2–1	2–1	Friendly
5	17 November 2026	National Stadium, Kallang, Singapore	26	Singapore	4–0	7–0	Friendly

== Honours ==
Palmeiras

- Campeonato Brasileiro Série A: 2022, 2023
- Supercopa do Brasil: 2023
- Campeonato Paulista: 2023, 2024

Real Madrid

- UEFA Super Cup: 2024
- FIFA Intercontinental Cup: 2024

Individual

- Copa São Paulo de Futebol Júnior Player of the Tournament: 2022
- Campeonato Brasileiro Série A Best Newcomer: 2022
- Samba Gold Best Brazilian under-20 player of the year: 2022
- IFFHS Men's World Youth (U20) Team: 2023
- Troféu Mesa Redonda Best Left Winger: 2023
- Campeonato Paulista Best Player: 2024
- Campeonato Paulista Team of the Year: 2024
- UNFP Ligue 1 Player of the Month: December 2025/January 2026
