= 2023 SE Palmeiras season =

Palmeiras
2023 season
- President: Leila Pereira
- Coach: Abel Ferreira
- Stadium: Allianz Parque
- Série A: 1st
- Campeonato Paulista: Winners
- Copa Libertadores: Semi-finals
- Copa do Brasil: Quarter-finals
- Supercopa do Brasil: Winners
- Top goalscorer: League: Endrick (11 goals); All: Raphael Veiga (18 goals)
- Highest home attendance: 49,241 (vs. Santos – 4 February 2023)
- Lowest home attendance: 17,049 (vs. Santos – 8 October 2023)
- Average home league attendance: 33,167
| Home colors | Away colors | Third colors |

The 2023 season was the 109th in Sociedade Esportiva Palmeiras' existence. This season Palmeiras participated in the Campeonato Paulista, Copa Libertadores, Copa do Brasil, Série A and the Supercopa do Brasil.

== Squad information ==
As of 28 July 2023.

Note: Flags indicate national team as defined under FIFA eligibility rules; some limited exceptions apply. Players may hold more than one non-FIFA nationality.

| No. | Pos. | Nation | Player |
|---|---|---|---|
| 2 | DF | BRA | Marcos Rocha |
| 7 | FW | BRA | Dudu |
| 8 | MF | BRA | Zé Rafael |
| 9 | FW | BRA | Endrick |
| 10 | FW | BRA | Rony |
| 12 | DF | BRA | Mayke |
| 13 | DF | BRA | Luan |
| 14 | FW | BRA | Artur |
| 15 | DF | PAR | Gustavo Gómez (captain) |
| 18 | FW | ARG | José Manuel López |
| 19 | FW | BRA | Breno Lopes |
| 20 | MF | COL | Eduard Atuesta |
| 21 | GK | BRA | Weverton (vice-captain) |
| 22 | DF | URU | Joaquín Piquerez |

| No. | Pos. | Nation | Player |
|---|---|---|---|
| 23 | MF | BRA | Raphael Veiga |
| 25 | MF | BRA | Gabriel Menino |
| 26 | DF | BRA | Murilo |
| 27 | MF | COL | Richard Ríos |
| 30 | MF | BRA | Jailson |
| 31 | MF | BRA | Luis Guilherme |
| 32 | DF | BRA | Gustavo Garcia |
| 34 | DF | BRA | Naves |
| 35 | MF | BRA | Fabinho |
| 36 | DF | BRA | Vanderlan |
| 37 | DF | BRA | Kevin |
| 40 | MF | BRA | Jhon Jhon |
| 42 | GK | BRA | Marcelo Lomba |
| — | GK | BRA | Mateus |

=== Transfers ===
==== Transfers in ====
| Pos. | Player | Transferred from | Fee/notes | Date | Source |
|---|---|---|---|---|---|
| FW | (Brazil) Giovani | Youth team | | 2 January 2023 | |
| MF | (Brazil) Jhon Jhon | Youth team | | 2 January 2023 | |
| DF | (Brazil) Gustavo Garcia | Youth team | | 2 January 2023 | |
| DF | (Brazil) Vanderlan | Youth team | | 2 January 2023 | |
| DF | (Brazil) Naves | Youth team | | 2 January 2023 | |
| MF | (Brazil) Fabinho | Youth team | | 2 January 2023 | |
| FW | (Brazil) Endrick | Youth team | | 2 January 2023 | |
| MF | (Colombia) Richard Ríos | (Brazil) Guarani | Sign. | 28 March 2023 | |
| FW | (Brazil) Artur | (Brazil) Red Bull Bragantino | Sign. | 31 March 2023 | |
| FW | (Brazil) Kevin | Youth team | | 12 July 2023 | |
| MF | (Brazil) Luis Guilherme | Youth team | | 26 July 2023 | |

==== Transfers out ====
| Pos. | Player | Transferred to | Fee/notes | Date | Source |
|---|---|---|---|---|---|
| MF | (Brazil) Gustavo Scarpa | (England) Nottingham Forest | End of contract. Will join the team in January 2023. | 10 July 2022 | |
| DF | (Brazil) Jorge | (Brazil) Fluminense | Loan. | 22 December 2022 | |
| FW | (Brazil) Wesley | (Brazil) Cruzeiro | Sign. | 27 December 2022 | |
| MF | (Brazil) Danilo | (England) Nottingham Forest | Sign. | 16 January 2023 | |
| FW | (Uruguay) Miguel Merentiel | (Argentina) Boca Juniors | Loan. | 2 February 2023 | |
| DF | (Chile) Benjamín Kuscevic | (Brazil) Coritiba | Sign. | 10 February 2023 | |
| FW | (Brazil) Giovani | (Qatar) Al Sadd | €9,000,000 | 27 June 2023 | |
| MF | (Brazil) Bruno Tabata | Qatar SC | Loan. | 7 July 2023 | |
| FW | (Brazil) Rafael Navarro | (United States) Colorado Rapids | Loan. | 7 July 2023 | |
| GK | (Brazil) Vinícius | (Portugal) Portimonense | Sign. | 18 July 2023 | |

== Competitions ==
=== Overview ===
| Competition | First match | Last match | Starting round | Final position | Record | | | | | | | |
| Competition | First match | Last match | Starting round | Final position | Pld | W | D | L | GF | GA | GD | Win % |
|---|---|---|---|---|---|---|---|---|---|---|---|---|
| Série A | 15 April 2023 | 6 December 2023 | Matchday 1 | Winners | 38 | 20 | 10 | 8 | 64 | 33 | +31 | 52.63 |
| Copa do Brasil | 12 April 2023 | 13 July 2023 | Third round | Quarter-finals | 6 | 2 | 1 | 3 | 9 | 7 | +2 | 33.33 |
| Campeonato Paulista | 14 January 2023 | 9 April 2023 | Matchday 1 | Winners | 16 | 11 | 4 | 1 | 25 | 7 | +18 | 68.75 |
| Copa Libertadores | 5 April 2023 | 5 October 2023 | Group stage | Semi-finals | 12 | 7 | 4 | 1 | 22 | 7 | +15 | 58.33 |
| Supercopa do Brasil | 28 January 2023 | | Final | Winners | 1 | 1 | 0 | 0 | 4 | 3 | +1 | 100.00 |
| Total | | | | | 73 | 41 | 19 | 13 | 124 | 57 | +67 | 56.16 |

Source: Competitions

=== Campeonato Paulista ===
Palmeiras was drawn into Group D.

==== First stage ====
| Pos | Team | Pld | W | D | L | GF | GA | GD | Pts | Qualification or relegation |
|---|---|---|---|---|---|---|---|---|---|---|
| 1 | Palmeiras | 12 | 8 | 4 | 0 | 18 | 5 | +13 | 28 | Knockout stage |
| 2 | São Bernardo | 12 | 8 | 2 | 2 | 21 | 9 | +12 | 26 | Knockout stage |
| 3 | Santo André | 12 | 4 | 2 | 6 | 9 | 14 | −5 | 14 | |
| 4 | Portuguesa | 12 | 2 | 4 | 6 | 10 | 18 | −8 | 10 | |

Source: Soccerway

| 14 January 2023 1 | Palmeiras | 0–0 | São Bento | São Paulo |
| 18:30 UTC−3 | Dudu (yellow card) 3' | Report | Jatobá (yellow card) 38'; Lucas Lima (yellow card) 44'; Bruno Aguiar (yellow card) 53'; Ivan (yellow card) 86' | Stadium: Allianz Parque; Attendance: 39,164; Referee: Flávio Rodrigues de Souza |

| 19 January 2023 2 | Botafogo-SP | 0–1 | Palmeiras | Ribeirão Preto |
| 21:30 UTC−3 | Lucas Lourenço (yellow card) 90+1' | Report | Raphael Veiga 25'; Endrick (yellow card) 45+2'; Gómez (yellow card) 57' | Stadium: Santa Cruz; Attendance: 19,395; Referee: Luiz Flávio de Oliveira |

| 22 January 2023 3 | Palmeiras | 0–0 | São Paulo | São Paulo |
| 16:00 UTC−3 | Dudu (yellow card) 81'; Breno Lopes (yellow card) 90+6' | Report | Rafael (yellow card) 32' | Stadium: Allianz Parque; Attendance: 40,196; Referee: Edina Alves Batista |

| 25 January 2023 4 | Ituano | 1–3 | Palmeiras | Itu |
| 19:30 UTC−3 | José Aldo (yellow card) 37'; Eduardo Person 52'; Felipe Saraiva (yellow card) 78'; Bernardo Schappo (yellow card) 82' | Report | Rafael Navarro 30'; López (yellow card) 63'; Lucas Siqueira 73' (o.g.); Bruno Tabata 82' (pen.); Vanderlan (yellow card) 85' | Stadium: Novelli Júnior; Attendance: 10,169; Referee: Thiago Luis Scarascati |

| 1 February 2023 5 | Mirassol | 0–2 | Palmeiras | Mirassol |
| 21:35 UTC−3 | Zé Roberto (yellow card) 70'; Flávio (yellow card) 82' | Report | Jailson (yellow card) 14'; Breno Lopes 67'; Atuesta (yellow card) 76', (goal) 90+3' | Stadium: José Maria de Campos Maia; Attendance: 10,161; Referee: Salim Fende Chavez |

| 4 February 2023 6 | Palmeiras | 3–1 | Santos | São Paulo |
| 18:30 UTC−3 | Murilo 22'; Rony 45+6'; Gabriel Menino (yellow card) 53'; Marcos Rocha (yellow card) 56'; Giovani 71'; Zé Rafael (yellow card) 77' | Report | Dodi (yellow card) 45+4'; Camacho (yellow card) 81'; Eduardo Bauermann 90+4' | Stadium: Morumbi; Attendance: 49,241; Referee: Vinícius Gonçalves Dias Araújo |

| 9 February 2023 7 | Palmeiras | 2–0 | Inter de Limeira | São Paulo |
| 19:30 UTC−3 | Raphael Veiga 18' (pen.); Piquerez 35' | Report | Eliandro (yellow card) 85' | Stadium: Allianz Parque; Attendance: 31,855; Referee: Edina Alves Batista |

| 12 February 2023 8 | Água Santa | 0–1 | Palmeiras | Diadema |
| 11:00 UTC−3 | Joílson (yellow card) 43'; Thiaguinho (yellow card) 76'; Rodrigo Sam (yellow card) 80'; Lelê (yellow card) 90' | Report | Rony 47'; Murilo (yellow card) 80' | Stadium: Distrital do Inamar; Attendance: 5,768; Referee: João Vitor Gobi |

| 16 February 2023 9 | Corinthians | 2–2 | Palmeiras | São Paulo |
| 21:30 UTC−3 | Róger Guedes 9', (yellow card) 84'; Gil 78' | Report | Rony 43', 53'; Gabriel Menino (yellow card) 64'; Jailson (yellow card) 90+3' | Stadium: Neo Química Arena; Attendance: 45,528; Referee: Raphael Claus |

| 22 February 2023 10 | Palmeiras | 2–0 | Red Bull Bragantino | São Paulo |
| 21:35 UTC−3 | Rony 13', (yellow card) 79'; Endrick (yellow card) 36'; Weverton (yellow card) 37'; Breno Lopes 90+3' | Report | Matheus Fernandes (yellow card) 61'; Gustavinho (yellow card) 84' | Stadium: Allianz Parque; Attendance: 33,352; Referee: Douglas Marques das Flores |

| 26 February 2023 11 | Palmeiras | 2–1 | Ferroviária | São Paulo |
| 18:30 UTC−3 | Gabriel Menino 42'; Raphael Veiga 61' | Report | Léo Santos (yellow card) 77'; Matheus Lucas 90+2' | Stadium: Allianz Parque; Attendance: 28,699; Referee: Vinícius Gonçalves Dias Araújo |

| 5 March 2023 12 | Guarani | 0–0 | Palmeiras | Campinas |
| 16:00 UTC−3 | Bruno José (yellow card) 5' | Report | Piquerez (yellow card) 34'; Zé Rafael (yellow card) 54' | Stadium: Brinco de Ouro; Attendance: 12,593; Referee: Thiago Luis Scarascati |

==== Quarter-final ====
| 11 March 2023 | Palmeiras | 1–0 | São Bernardo | São Paulo |
| 19:00 UTC−3 | Rony 42'; Zé Rafael (yellow card) 45+1'; Raphael Veiga (yellow card) 63' | Report | Alex Alves (yellow card) 13'; Rafael Vaz (yellow card) 29'; Rodrigo Souza (yellow card) 39'; Chrystian Barletta (yellow card) 45+2'; Jeferson (yellow card) 53' | Stadium: Allianz Parque; Attendance: 39,258; Referee: Edina Alves Batista |

==== Semi-final ====
| 19 March 2023 | Palmeiras | 1–0 | Ituano | São Paulo |
| 16:00 UTC−3 | Murilo (yellow card) 5', (goal) 58' | Report | Claudinho (yellow card) 64' | Stadium: Allianz Parque; Attendance: 40,664; Referee: Flávio Rodrigues de Souza |

==== Finals ====
| 2 April 2023 First leg | Água Santa | 2–1 | Palmeiras | Barueri |
| 16:00 UTC−3 | Marcondes (yellow card) 32'; Didi (yellow card) 35'; Bruno Mezenga 44', 90+2', (yellow card) 61'; Igor Henrique (yellow card) 57'; Reginaldo (yellow card) 90+7' | Report | Endrick 53'; Gabriel Menino (yellow card) 63' | Stadium: Arena Barueri; Attendance: 22,896; Referee: Edina Alves Batista |

| 9 April 2023 Second leg | Palmeiras | 4–0 (5–2 agg.) | Água Santa | São Paulo |
| 16:00 UTC−3 | Gabriel Menino 15', 27', (yellow card) 28'; Endrick 34'; Dudu (yellow card) 39'; Murilo (yellow card) 70'; López 73', (yellow card) 90+1'; Vanderlan (yellow card) 78'; Zé Rafael (yellow card) 81' | Report | Bruno Mezenga (yellow card) 12'; Marcondes (yellow card) 14'; Kady (yellow card) 29'; Luan Dias (yellow card) 40'; Villian (red card) 40'; Júnior Todinho (yellow card) 78' | Stadium: Allianz Parque; Attendance: 41,444; Referee: Raphael Claus |

=== Copa Libertadores ===
==== Group stage ====
The draw for the group stage was held on 27 March 2023, 20:00 PYST (UTC−4), at the CONMEBOL Convention Centre in Luque, Paraguay.

| Pos | Team | Pld | W | D | L | GF | GA | GD | Pts | Qualification |
|---|---|---|---|---|---|---|---|---|---|---|
| 1 | (Brazil) Palmeiras | 6 | 5 | 0 | 1 | 16 | 6 | +10 | 15 | Advance to round of 16 |
| 2 | (Bolivia) Bolívar | 6 | 4 | 0 | 2 | 11 | 7 | +4 | 12 | Advance to round of 16 |
| 3 | (Ecuador) Barcelona | 6 | 1 | 1 | 4 | 7 | 12 | −5 | 4 | Transfer to Copa Sudamericana |
| 4 | (Paraguay) Cerro Porteño | 6 | 1 | 1 | 4 | 5 | 14 | −9 | 4 | |

Source: CONMEBOL
Rules for classification: 1) Points; 2) Goal difference; 3) Goals scored; 4) Away goals scored; 5) CONMEBOL ranking.

| 5 April 2023 1 | Bolívar (Bolivia) | 3–1 | (Brazil) Palmeiras | La Paz, Bolivia |
| 21:30 UTC−3 | Hervías 20'; Sagredo (yellow card) 33' (yellow-red card) 52'; Bejarano 45+1'; Uzeda 89'; Villamil (yellow card) 90+4' | Report | López 13'; Jailson (yellow card) 35' (yellow-red card) 44'; Luan (yellow card) 36' | Stadium: Estadio Hernando Siles; Referee: Alexis Herrera (Venezuela) |

| 20 April 2023 2 | Palmeiras (Brazil) | 2–1 | (Paraguay) Cerro Porteño | São Paulo, Brazil |
| 21:00 UTC−3 | Marcos Rocha (yellow card) 53'; Gómez 64'; Rafael Navarro 76'; Artur (yellow card) 79' | Report | Bobadilla 5'; Piris Da Motta (yellow card) 27'; Churín (yellow card) 31'; Aquino (yellow card) 45+4' | Stadium: Morumbi; Attendance: 42,340; Referee: Fernando Rapallini (Argentina) |

| 3 May 2023 3 | Barcelona (Ecuador) | 0–2 | (Brazil) Palmeiras | Guayaquil, Ecuador |
| 21:30 UTC−3 | Pineida (yellow card) 36'; Rodríguez (yellow card) 80' | Report | Rony (yellow card) 20'; Luan (yellow card) 33'; Raphael Veiga 45+3' (pen.), (yellow card) 45+5'; Gómez 47' | Stadium: Estadio Monumental Isidro Romero Carbo; Attendance: 17,726; Referee: Andrés Rojas (Colombia) |

| 24 May 2023 4 | Cerro Porteño (Paraguay) | 0–3 | (Brazil) Palmeiras | Asunción, Paraguay |
| 19:00 UTC−3 | Báez (red card) 15'; Piris Da Motta (yellow card) 33'; Lucena (yellow card) 77' | Report | Artur 25', 58'; Piquerez (yellow card) 39'; Gómez (yellow card) 56'; Rony 68'; Ríos (red card) 77' | Stadium: Estadio General Pablo Rojas; Attendance: 23,492; Referee: Andrés Matonte (Uruguay) |

| 7 June 2023 5 | Palmeiras (Brazil) | 4–2 | (Ecuador) Barcelona | São Paulo, Brazil |
| 21:30 UTC−3 | Gómez 46', (yellow card) 80'; Piquerez 58'; Artur 70'; Endrick 86' | Report | Fydriszewski 33', 38'; Díaz (yellow card) 53' | Stadium: Allianz Parque; Attendance: 33,602; Referee: Andrés Rojas (Colombia) |

| 29 June 2023 6 | Palmeiras (Brazil) | 4–0 | (Bolivia) Bolívar | São Paulo, Brazil |
| 21:00 UTC−3 | Rony 24'; Artur 34', 85'; Piquerez 76' | Report | Villamil (yellow card) 41' | Stadium: Allianz Parque; Attendance: 33,250; Referee: Jesús Valenzuela (Venezuela) |

==== Round of 16 ====
The draw for the round of 16 was held on 5 July 2023, 12:00 PYST (UTC−4), at the CONMEBOL Convention Centre in Luque, Paraguay.

| 2 August 2023 First leg | Atlético Mineiro (Brazil) | 0–1 | (Brazil) Palmeiras | Belo Horizonte, Brazil |
| 21:30 UTC−3 | Arana (yellow card) 77' | Report | Raphael Veiga 29'; Gabriel Menino (yellow card) 62'; Jhon Jhon (yellow card) 68' | Stadium: Mineirão; Attendance: 52,587; Referee: Facundo Tello (Argentina) |

| 9 August 2023 Second leg | Palmeiras (Brazil) | 0–0 (1–0 agg.) | (Brazil) Atlético Mineiro | São Paulo, Brazil |
| 21:30 UTC−3 | Gabriel Menino (yellow card) 1'; Rony (yellow card) 60'; Gómez (yellow card) 82'; Murilo (yellow card) 88'; Endrick (red card) 90+4' | Report | Saravia (yellow card) 77'; Edenílson (yellow card) 89' | Stadium: Allianz Parque; Attendance: 40,527; Referee: Fernando Rapallini (Argentina) |

==== Quarter-finals ====
| 23 August 2023 First leg | Deportivo Pereira (Colombia) | 0–4 | (Brazil) Palmeiras | Pereira, Colombia |
| 21:30 UTC−3 | Vásquez (yellow card) 49'; Quintero (yellow card) 68' | Report | Raphael Veiga 23' (pen.); Marcos Rocha 31'; Mayke 34'; Gabriel Menino (yellow card) 70'; Rony 82'; Fabinho (yellow card) 90+1' | Stadium: Estadio Hernán Ramírez Villegas; Attendance: 22,789; Referee: Facundo Tello (Argentina) |

| 30 August 2023 Second leg | Palmeiras (Brazil) | 0–0 (4–0 agg.) | (Colombia) Deportivo Pereira | São Paulo, Brazil |
| 21:30 UTC−3 | | Report | Murillo (yellow card) 38'; Bocanegra (yellow card) 40'; Quintero (yellow card) 73' (yellow-red card) 76' | Stadium: Allianz Parque; Attendance: 37,785; Referee: Cristian Garay (Chile) |

==== Semi-finals ====
| 28 September 2023 First leg | Boca Juniors (Argentina) | 0–0 | (Brazil) Palmeiras | Buenos Aires, Argentina |
| 21:30 UTC−3 | Advíncula (yellow card) 31'; Benedetto (yellow card) 57' | Report | Zé Rafael (yellow card) 23' | Stadium: La Bombonera; Attendance: 53,615; Referee: Wilmar Roldán (Colombia) |

| 5 October 2023 Second leg | Palmeiras (Brazil) | 1–1 (1–1 agg.) (2–4 p) | (Argentina) Boca Juniors | São Paulo, Brazil |
| 21:30 UTC−3 | Rony (yellow card) 15'; Gómez (yellow card) 40'; Raphael Veiga (yellow card) 43'; Piquerez 73'; Endrick (yellow card) 83' | Report | Cavani 23'; Rojo (yellow card) 51' (yellow-red card) 66'; Fabra (yellow card) 69'; Figal (yellow card) 75'; E. Fernández (yellow card) 76'; Medina (yellow card) 90'; Romero (yellow card) 90+3' | Stadium: Allianz Parque; Attendance: 40,398; Referee: Andrés Matonte (Uruguay) |
| | Penalties |
| | Raphael Veiga (penalty missed); Gómez (penalty missed); Kevin (penalty scored); Piquerez (penalty scored) | | (penalty missed) Cavani; (penalty scored) Valdez; (penalty scored) Valentini; (penalty scored) Figal; (penalty scored) G. Fernández |

=== Série A ===
==== Standings ====
| Pos | Team | Pld | W | D | L | GF | GA | GD | Pts | Qualification or relegation |
|---|---|---|---|---|---|---|---|---|---|---|
| 1 | Palmeiras (C) | 38 | 20 | 10 | 8 | 64 | 33 | +31 | 70 | Qualification for Copa Libertadores group stage |
| 2 | Grêmio | 38 | 21 | 5 | 12 | 63 | 56 | +7 | 68 | Qualification for Copa Libertadores group stage |
| 3 | Atlético Mineiro | 38 | 19 | 9 | 10 | 52 | 32 | +20 | 66 | Qualification for Copa Libertadores group stage |
| 4 | Flamengo | 38 | 19 | 9 | 10 | 56 | 42 | +14 | 66 | Qualification for Copa Libertadores group stage |
| 5 | Botafogo | 38 | 18 | 10 | 10 | 58 | 37 | +21 | 64 | Qualification for Copa Libertadores second stage |

Source: CBF
Rules for classification: 1) points; 2) wins; 3) goal difference; 4) goals scored; 5) head-to-head results (only between two teams); 6) fewest red cards; 7) fewest yellow cards; 8) drawing of lots.
(C) Champions

==== Result by round ====
| Round | 1 | 2 | 3 | 4 | 5 | 6 | 7 | 8 | 9 | 10 | 11 | 12 | 13 | 14 | 15 | 16 | 17 | 18 | 19 | 20 | 21 | 22 | 23 | 24 | 25 | 26 | 27 | 28 | 29 | 30 | 31 | 32 | 33 | 34 | 35 | 36 | 37 | 38 |
|---|---|---|---|---|---|---|---|---|---|---|---|---|---|---|---|---|---|---|---|---|---|---|---|---|---|---|---|---|---|---|---|---|---|---|---|---|---|---|
| Ground | H | A | H | A | H | H | A | A | H | A | A | H | A | H | A | H | A | A | H | A | H | A | H | A | A | H | H | A | H | H | A | H | A | H | A | H | H | A |
| Result | W | D | W | W | W | D | D | D | W | W | L | L | D | D | D | W | W | L | W | W | W | D | W | L | L | L | L | W | W | W | W | W | L | W | D | W | W | D |
| Position | 7 | 4 | 3 | 2 | 2 | 2 | 2 | 2 | 2 | 2 | 2 | 4 | 4 | 5 | 6 | 4 | 3 | 4 | 2 | 2 | 2 | 2 | 2 | 2 | 4 | 4 | 5 | 4 | 3 | 2 | 2 | 2 | 3 | 1 | 1 | 1 | 1 | 1 |

Source: CBF

==== Matches ====
The full schedule was announced on 14 February 2023.

| 15 April 2023 1 | Palmeiras | 2–1 | Cuiabá | São Paulo |
| 16:00 UTC−3 | Endrick 5'; López (yellow card) 37', (goal) 65'; Jhon Jhon (yellow card) 66' | Report | Deyverson (yellow card) 7'; Jonathan Cafú (yellow card) 45+4'; Raniele 45+7'; Mateusinho (yellow card) 48'; Filipe Augusto (yellow card) 52' (yellow-red card) 57' | Stadium: Allianz Parque; Attendance: 35,835; Referee: Paulo César Zanovelli da Silva (Minas Gerais) |

| 23 April 2023 2 | Vasco | 2–2 | Palmeiras | Rio de Janeiro |
| 16:00 UTC−3 | Jair (yellow card) 7'; Lucas Piton (yellow card) 11'; Pedro Raul 29', (yellow card) 57'; Gabriel Pec 40', (yellow card) 85' | Report | Zé Rafael (yellow card) 16'; Gabriel Menino (yellow card) 33'; Rafael Navarro 45+1'; Artur 62'; Murilo (yellow card) 90' | Stadium: Maracanã; Attendance: 56,451; Referee: Rafael Rodrigo Klein (Rio Grande do Sul) |

| 29 April 2023 3 | Palmeiras | 2–1 | Corinthians | São Paulo |
| 18:30 UTC−3 | Murilo 16'; Raphael Veiga 36'; Piquerez (yellow card) 39'; Mayke (yellow card) 55'; Rafael Navarro (yellow card) 72' | Report | Róger Guedes (yellow card) 21'; Giuliano (yellow card) 72'; Piquerez 76' (o.g.); Du Queiroz (yellow card) 77' | Stadium: Allianz Parque; Attendance: 41,457; Referee: Wilton Pereira Sampaio (Goiás) |

| 7 May 2023 4 | Goiás | 0–5 | Palmeiras | Goiânia |
| 18:30 UTC−3 | Bruno Melo (yellow card) 14'; Lucas Halter (red card) 41'; Dieguinho (yellow card) 69' | Report | Artur 10'; Mayke (yellow card) 25'; Raphael Veiga (yellow card) 45+5', (goal) 78'; Sidimar 48' (o.g.); Piquerez (yellow card) 66'; Zé Rafael (yellow card) 68'; Gómez (yellow card) 71'; Endrick (yellow card) 76', (goal) 83'; Dudu 90' | Stadium: Serrinha; Attendance: 13,789; Referee: Wagner do Nascimento Magalhães (Rio de Janeiro) |

| 10 May 2023 5 | Palmeiras | 4–1 | Grêmio | São Paulo |
| 21:30 UTC−3 | Raphael Veiga 23', 56' (pen.); Zé Rafael (yellow card) 27'; Mayke 68'; Luan 73'; Piquerez (yellow card) 82' | Report | Villasanti (yellow card) 29'; Bitello 45+2'; Gabriel Grando (yellow card) 51'; Bruno Uvini (yellow card) 55'; Kannemann (yellow card) 61' | Stadium: Allianz Parque; Attendance: 37,532; Referee: Bráulio da Silva Machado (Santa Catarina) |

| 13 May 2023 6 | Palmeiras | 1–1 | Red Bull Bragantino | São Paulo |
| 18:30 UTC−3 | Artur 65'; Gómez (yellow card) 89' | Report | Juninho Capixaba (yellow card) 17', (goal) 71'; Eric Ramires (yellow card) 42'; Cleiton (yellow card) 83'; Alerrandro (yellow card) 86' | Stadium: Allianz Parque; Attendance: 39,488; Referee: Sávio Pereira Sampaio (Distrito Federal) |

| 20 May 2023 7 | Santos | 0–0 | Palmeiras | Santos |
| 21:00 UTC−3 | Ângelo (yellow card) 21'; Dodi (yellow card) 76'; Daniel Ruiz (yellow card) 88' | Report | Raphael Veiga (yellow card) 15'; Mayke (yellow card) 33' | Stadium: Vila Belmiro; Attendance: 12,641; Referee: Raphael Claus (São Paulo) |

| 28 May 2023 8 | Atlético Mineiro | 1–1 | Palmeiras | Belo Horizonte |
| 18:30 UTC−3 | Nathan Silva (yellow card) 24'; Pavón (yellow card) 40', (goal) 45'; Zaracho (yellow card) 44' | Report | Gabriel Menino (yellow card) 15'; Raphael Veiga (yellow card) 45+2'; Dudu 52'; Vanderlan (yellow card) 90+6' | Stadium: Mineirão; Attendance: 53,236; Referee: Bráulio da Silva Machado (Santa Catarina) |

| 4 June 2023 9 | Palmeiras | 3–1 | Coritiba | São Paulo |
| 18:30 UTC−3 | Artur 30'; Rony 34', 73'; Zé Rafael (yellow card) 51'; Luan (yellow card) 90+1'; Gómez (yellow card) 90+1'; Jhon Jhon (yellow card) 90+6' | Report | Bruno Viana (yellow card) 37'; Kuscevic (yellow card) 56'; Alef Manga 83'; Andrey (yellow card) 90+5'; Henrique (yellow card) 90+6'; Júnior Urso (yellow card) 90+6' | Stadium: Allianz Parque; Attendance: 32,570; Referee: Felipe Fernandes de Lima (Minas Gerais) |

| 11 June 2023 10 | São Paulo | 0–2 | Palmeiras | São Paulo |
| 16:00 UTC−3 | David (yellow card) 89'; Rodriguinho (yellow card) 90'; Pablo Maia (yellow card) 90+3' (yellow-red card) 90+4' | Report | Gabriel Menino 11'; Endrick 78'; Artur (yellow card) 89' | Stadium: Morumbi; Attendance: 56,871; Referee: Raphael Claus (São Paulo) |

| 21 June 2023 11 | Bahia | 1–0 | Palmeiras | Salvador |
| 21:30 UTC−3 | Vinícius Mingotti (yellow card) 14'; Ademir (yellow card) 44'; Kayky (yellow card) 75'; Thaciano 90+3'; Everaldo (yellow card) 90+7' | Report | Endrick (yellow card) 9'; Gabriel Menino (yellow card) 74'; Breno Lopes (yellow card) 87' | Stadium: Arena Fonte Nova; Attendance: 31,013; Referee: Wilton Pereira Sampaio (Goiás) |

| 25 June 2023 12 | Palmeiras | 0–1 | Botafogo | São Paulo |
| 16:00 UTC−3 | | Report | Tiquinho Soares 28'; Tchê Tchê (yellow card) 31'; Danilo Barbosa (yellow card) 61'; Matheus Nascimento (yellow card) 90+6' | Stadium: Allianz Parque; Attendance: 38,877; Referee: Anderson Daronco (Rio Grande do Sul) |

| 2 July 2023 13 | Athletico Paranaense | 2–2 | Palmeiras | Curitiba |
| 16:00 UTC−3 | Zé Ivaldo (yellow card) 4'; Vitor Bueno 67' (pen.), (yellow card) 74'; Vitor Roque 72', (yellow card) 81'; Madson (yellow card) 85' | Report | Endrick 22'; Gustavo Garcia (yellow card) 45+4' (yellow-red card) 66'; Gabriel Menino 57' | Stadium: Arena da Baixada; Attendance: 33,118; Referee: Jean Pierre Gonçalves Lima (Rio Grande do Sul) |

| 8 July 2023 14 | Palmeiras | 1–1 | Flamengo | São Paulo |
| 21:00 UTC−3 | Dudu 24'; Mayke (yellow card) 35'; Ríos (yellow card) 76' | Report | Victor Hugo (yellow card) 33'; Ayrton Lucas (yellow card) 55'; Fabrício Bruno (yellow card) 73'; De Arrascaeta 81' | Stadium: Allianz Parque; Attendance: 40,229; Referee: Ramon Abatti Abel (Santa Catarina) |

| 16 July 2023 15 | Internacional | 0–0 | Palmeiras | Porto Alegre |
| 18:30 UTC−3 | Vitão (yellow card) 25' | Report | Gabriel Menino (yellow card) 32'; López (yellow card) 38'; Gómez (yellow card) 82' | Stadium: Beira-Rio; Attendance: 41,823; Referee: Rodrigo José Pereira de Lima (Pernambuco) |

| 22 July 2023 16 | Palmeiras | 3–1 | Fortaleza | São Paulo |
| 16:00 UTC−3 | Ríos 8'; Raphael Veiga 76'; Piquerez (yellow card) 79'; Zé Rafael (yellow card) 81'; Weverton (yellow card) 83'; Breno Lopes 90+6' | Report | Marcelo Benevenuto (yellow card) 6'; Titi (yellow card) 9'; Lucero 45' (pen.); Lucas Sasha (yellow card) 75'; Zé Welison (yellow card) 78'; Brítez (yellow card) 82'; Romero (yellow card) 85' | Stadium: Allianz Parque; Attendance: 39,699; Referee: Rafael Rodrigo Klein (Rio Grande do Sul) |

| 30 July 2023 17 | América Mineiro | 1–4 | Palmeiras | Belo Horizonte |
| 16:00 UTC−3 | Paulinho Bóia (yellow card) 16'; Nicolas 38'; Juninho (yellow card) 76' | Report | Murilo 18'; Rony 26', 59'; Gómez (yellow card) 37'; Artur 53' | Stadium: Independência; Attendance: 5,928; Referee: Bráulio da Silva Machado (Santa Catarina) |

| 5 August 2023 18 | Fluminense | 2–1 | Palmeiras | Rio de Janeiro |
| 21:00 UTC−3 | Jhon Arias 15' (pen.); John Kennedy (yellow card) 32', (goal) 59'; Lima (yellow card) 49'; Matheus Martinelli (yellow card) 83'; Lelê (yellow card) 87' (yellow-red card) 89'; Felipe Melo (yellow card) 90+5' | Report | Vanderlan (yellow card) 22'; Weverton (yellow card) 89'; Gómez 90+6' | Stadium: Maracanã; Attendance: 31,037; Referee: Ramon Abatti Abel (Santa Catarina) |

| 14 August 2023 19 | Palmeiras | 1–0 | Cruzeiro | São Paulo |
| 19:00 UTC−3 | Gómez (yellow card) 35'; Vanderlan (yellow card) 90'; López 90+6' | Report | Matheus Jussa (yellow card) 64'; Gilberto (yellow card) 81'; Palacios (yellow card) 90+5' | Stadium: Allianz Parque; Attendance: 38,555; Referee: Wagner do Nascimento Magalhães (Rio de Janeiro) |

| 19 August 2023 20 | Cuiabá | 0–2 | Palmeiras | Cuiabá |
| 18:30 UTC−3 | Alan Empereur (yellow card) 37'; Marllon (yellow card) 74' | Report | Piquerez (yellow card) 18'; Raphael Veiga 31', (yellow card) 31'; Luan (yellow card) 38'; Murilo (yellow card) 44'; Jhon Jhon (yellow card) 58'; Zé Rafael (yellow card) 65'; Ríos 66' | Stadium: Arena Pantanal; Attendance: 19,115; Referee: André Luiz Skettino Policarpo Bento (Minas Gerais) |

| 27 August 2023 21 | Palmeiras | 1–0 | Vasco | São Paulo |
| 18:30 UTC−3 | Ríos (yellow card) 56'; Raphael Veiga 65'; Luan (yellow card) 90+7' | Report | Robson Bambu (yellow card) 48'; Zé Gabriel (yellow card) 64' | Stadium: Allianz Parque; Attendance: 40,292; Referee: Wilton Pereira Sampaio (Goiás) |

| 3 September 2023 22 | Corinthians | 0–0 | Palmeiras | São Paulo |
| 16:00 UTC−3 | Maycon (red card) 90+6'; Lucas Veríssimo (yellow card) 90+8' | Report | Zé Rafael (yellow card) 84'; Gómez (yellow card) 90+2'; Murilo (yellow card) 90+3' (yellow-red card) 90+3' | Stadium: Neo Química Arena; Attendance: 44,371; Referee: Anderson Daronco (Rio Grande do Sul) |

| 15 September 2023 23 | Palmeiras | 1–0 | Goiás | São Paulo |
| 21:30 UTC−3 | López (yellow card) 30'; Kevin (yellow card) 67'; Rony (yellow card) 81'; Breno Lopes 90+6' | Report | Willian Oliveira (yellow card) 8'; Raphael Guzzo (yellow card) 72' (yellow-red card) 75' | Stadium: Allianz Parque; Attendance: 38,146; Referee: Sávio Pereira Sampaio (Distrito Federal) |

| 21 September 2023 24 | Grêmio | 1–0 | Palmeiras | Porto Alegre |
| 21:30 UTC−3 | João Pedro 9'; Rodrigo Ely (yellow card) 34'; João Pedro Galvão (yellow card) 45+6'; Villasanti (yellow card) 59' (yellow-red card) 86'; Gabriel Grando (yellow card) 90+9' | Report | Marcos Rocha (yellow card) 45+3'; Mayke (yellow card) 63'; Gabriel Menino (yellow card) 72' | Stadium: Arena do Grêmio; Attendance: 29,057; Referee: Bruno Arleu de Araújo (Rio de Janeiro) |

| 1 October 2023 25 | Red Bull Bragantino | 2–1 | Palmeiras | Bragança Paulista |
| 18:30 UTC−3 | Eduardo Sasha 61' (pen.); Aderlan (yellow card) 75'; Lucas Evangelista (yellow card) 76'; Eric Ramires 90'; Cleiton (yellow card) 90+3'; Borbas (yellow card) 90+7' | Report | Endrick 15'; Vanderlan (yellow card) 43'; Luan (yellow card) 90+7' | Stadium: Nabi Abi Chedid; Attendance: 9,093; Referee: Wagner do Nascimento Magalhães (Rio de Janeiro) |

| 8 October 2023 26 | Palmeiras | 1–2 | Santos | Barueri |
| 16:00 UTC−3 | Zé Rafael (yellow card) 14', (goal) 43'; Ríos (yellow card) 90+5' | Report | Rincón (yellow card) 41', (goal) 45+1'; Morelos (yellow card) 42'; Marcos Leonardo 70'; Camacho (yellow card) 73' | Stadium: Arena Barueri; Attendance: 17,049; Referee: Flávio Rodrigues de Souza (São Paulo) |
Note: Match moved to the Arena Barueri due to The Weeknd concert in the Allianz Parque.

| 19 October 2023 27 | Palmeiras | 0–2 | Atlético Mineiro | São Paulo |
| 19:00 UTC−3 | Kevin (yellow card) 20'; Rony (yellow card) 45+6'; Jhon Jhon (yellow card) 55'; Gómez (yellow card) 69'; Endrick (yellow card) 90'; Fabinho (yellow card) 90+8' | Report | Hulk 2'; Alan Franco (yellow card) 57'; Zaracho (yellow card) 70'; Rubens (yellow card) 74'; Paulinho 76' | Stadium: Allianz Parque; Attendance: 27,718; Referee: Bruno Arleu de Araújo (Rio de Janeiro) |

| 22 October 2023 28 | Coritiba | 0–2 | Palmeiras | Curitiba |
| 18:30 UTC−3 | Natanael (yellow card) 90+3' | Report | Gómez 33'; Ríos (yellow card) 35'; Piquerez 45+3' | Stadium: Couto Pereira; Attendance: 21,638; Referee: Rafael Rodrigo Klein (Rio Grande do Sul) |

| 25 October 2023 29 | Palmeiras | 5–0 | São Paulo | São Paulo |
| 20:00 UTC−3 | Breno Lopes 16', 26'; Zé Rafael (yellow card) 21'; Endrick (yellow card) 44'; Piquerez 45+7' (pen.), 87'; Raphael Veiga (yellow card) 45+10'; Marcos Rocha 84' | Report | Beraldo (yellow card) 25'; Rafinha (yellow card) 45+2' (yellow-red card) 61'; Wellington Rato (yellow card) 79' | Stadium: Allianz Parque; Attendance: 32,618; Referee: Raphael Claus (São Paulo) |

| 28 October 2023 30 | Palmeiras | 1–0 | Bahia | São Paulo |
| 19:00 UTC−3 | Raphael Veiga 38'; Fabinho (yellow card) 50' | Report | Acevedo (yellow card) 9' (yellow-red card) 90'; Kanu (yellow card) 45+3'; Everaldo (yellow card) 77' | Stadium: Allianz Parque; Attendance: 33,747; Referee: Rodrigo José Pereira de Lima (Pernambuco) |

| 1 November 2023 31 | Botafogo | 3–4 | Palmeiras | Rio de Janeiro |
| 21:30 UTC−3 | Carlos Eduardo 21'; Tchê Tchê 30', (yellow card) 80'; Cuesta (yellow card) 33'; Júnior Santos 36'; Tiquinho Soares (yellow card) 69'; Adryelson (red card) 76'; Marçal (yellow card) 83'; Marlon Freitas (yellow card) 90+7'; Di Plácido (yellow card) 90+9' | Report | Mayke (yellow card) 11'; Endrick 49', 84'; Rony (yellow card) 80'; Gómez (yellow card) 80'; Artur (yellow card) 88'; López 89'; Murilo 90+9', (yellow card) 90+10' | Stadium: Nilton Santos; Attendance: 34,913; Referee: Bráulio da Silva Machado (Santa Catarina) |

| 4 November 2023 32 | Palmeiras | 1–0 | Athletico Paranaense | Barueri |
| 21:30 UTC−3 | Endrick 6'; Luan (yellow card) 14'; Zé Rafael (yellow card) 78'; Jhon Jhon (yellow card) 90+4' | Report | Esquivel (yellow card) 15'; Thiago Heleno (yellow card) 37'; Cacá (yellow card) 51'; Christian (yellow card) 90+2' | Stadium: Arena Barueri; Attendance: 17,301; Referee: Wilton Pereira Sampaio (Goiás) |
Note: Match moved to the Arena Barueri due to the a concert scheduled for the same date in the Allianz Parque.

| 8 November 2023 33 | Flamengo | 3–0 | Palmeiras | Rio de Janeiro |
| 21:30 UTC−3 | Pedro (yellow card) 16', (goal) 18', 64'; De Arrascaeta 29' | Report | Gómez (red card) 48'; Vanderlan (yellow card) 89' | Stadium: Maracanã; Attendance: 64,590; Referee: Rodrigo José Pereira de Lima (Pernambuco) |

| 11 November 2023 34 | Palmeiras | 3–0 | Internacional | Barueri |
| 21:00 UTC−3 | Murilo (yellow card) 36'; Zé Rafael 38'; Endrick 59'; Rony 88' | Report | Aránguiz (yellow card) 14'; Dalbert (yellow card) 33'; Alan Patrick (yellow card) 68' | Stadium: Arena Barueri; Attendance: 19,358; Referee: Paulo César Zanovelli da Silva (Minas Gerais) |
Note: Match moved to the Arena Barueri due to the Roger Waters concert in the Allianz Parque.

| 26 November 2023 35 | Fortaleza | 2–2 | Palmeiras | Fortaleza |
| 18:30 UTC−3 | Bruno Pacheco (yellow card) 14'; Thiago Galhardo 20'; Calebe 70'; Marinho (yellow card) 90+7' | Report | Gómez (red card) 59'; Raphael Veiga 66'; Mayke (yellow card) 74'; Gustavo Garcia (yellow card) 75'; Zé Rafael 77' | Stadium: Arena Castelão; Attendance: 40,382; Referee: André Luiz Skettino Policarpo Bento (Minas Gerais) |

| 29 November 2023 36 | Palmeiras | 4–0 | América Mineiro | São Paulo |
| 21:30 UTC−3 | Endrick 2'; Naves (yellow card) 32'; Éder 40' (o.g.); Ríos (yellow card) 55'; López 88', 90+2' | Report | Júlio (yellow card) 15'; Éder (yellow card) 36' | Stadium: Allianz Parque; Attendance: 29,717; Referee: Wilton Pereira Sampaio (Goiás) |

| 3 December 2023 37 | Palmeiras | 1–0 | Fluminense | São Paulo |
| 16:00 UTC−3 | Gómez (yellow card) 18'; Breno Lopes 30' | Report | Lima (yellow card) 32'; Justen (red card) 55'; Lelê (yellow card) 75' | Stadium: Allianz Parque; Attendance: 29,986; Referee: Bráulio da Silva Machado (Santa Catarina) |

| 6 December 2023 38 | Cruzeiro | 1–1 | Palmeiras | Belo Horizonte |
| 21:30 UTC−3 | Lucas Silva (yellow card) 72'; Nikão 80' | Report | Endrick 21'; Ríos (yellow card) 64' | Stadium: Mineirão; Attendance: 44,190; Referee: Anderson Daronco (Rio Grande do Sul) |

=== Copa do Brasil ===
==== Third round ====
The draw for the third round was held on 29 March 2023. The order of the matches were announced later on the same day.

| 12 April 2023 First leg | Palmeiras (São Paulo (state)) | 4–2 | (Minas Gerais) Tombense | São Paulo |
| 20:00 UTC−3 | Gabriel Menino 37'; López 41'; Gómez 88' (pen.); Rafael Navarro 90+7' | Report | Matheus Frizzo 10'; Jáderson (yellow card) 32'; Roger Carvalho (yellow card) 40'; Daniel Amorim (yellow card) 45+7'; Bruno Silva (yellow card) 56'; Marcelinho 90' | Stadium: Allianz Parque; Attendance: 33,603; Referee: Bruno Arleu de Araújo (Rio de Janeiro) |

| 26 April 2023 Second leg | Tombense (Minas Gerais) | 1–1 (3–5 agg.) | (São Paulo (state)) Palmeiras | Uberlândia |
| 20:00 UTC−3 | Alex Sandro 86'; Elton (yellow card) 90' | Report | Breno Lopes 13' | Stadium: Parque do Sabiá; Attendance: 22,888; Referee: Ramon Abatti Abel (Santa Catarina) |

==== Round of 16 ====
The draw for the round of 16 was held on 2 May 2023. The order of the matches were announced later on the same day.

| 17 May 2023 First leg | Palmeiras (São Paulo (state)) | 3–0 | (Ceará) Fortaleza | São Paulo |
| 19:00 UTC−3 | Raphael Veiga 11' (pen.); Bruno Tabata 18'; Ríos 88' | Report | Yago Pikachu (yellow card) 15'; Tinga (yellow card) 87' | Stadium: Allianz Parque; Attendance: 32,254; Referee: Wagner do Nascimento Magalhães (Rio de Janeiro) |

| 31 May 2023 Second leg | Fortaleza (Ceará) | 1–0 (1–3 agg.) | (São Paulo (state)) Palmeiras | Fortaleza |
| 19:00 UTC−3 | Thiago Galhardo (yellow card) 25'; Lucero 73' | Report | Rony (yellow card) 38'; Piquerez (yellow card) 57'; Rafael Navarro (yellow card) 75'; Weverton (yellow card) 87' | Stadium: Arena Castelão; Attendance: 43,271; Referee: Sávio Pereira Sampaio (Distrito Federal) |

==== Quarter-finals ====
The draw for the quarter-finals was held on 6 June 2023. The order of the matches were announced later on the same day.

| 5 July 2023 First leg | São Paulo (São Paulo (state)) | 1–0 | (São Paulo (state)) Palmeiras | São Paulo |
| 19:30 UTC−3 | Gabriel Neves (yellow card) 44'; Pablo Maia (yellow card) 44'; Rafinha 82'; David (yellow card) 90+3'; Wellington Rato (yellow card) 90+4' | Report | Mayke (yellow card) 87'; Gómez (yellow card) 90+2' | Stadium: Morumbi; Attendance: 54,593; Referee: Bráulio da Silva Machado (Santa Catarina) |

| 13 July 2023 Second leg | Palmeiras (São Paulo (state)) | 1–2 (1–3 agg.) | (São Paulo (state)) São Paulo | São Paulo |
| 20:00 UTC−3 | Piquerez 34'; Mayke (yellow card) 42' | Report | Alisson (yellow card) 7'; Luciano (yellow card) 23'; Caio Paulista 49', (yellow card) 85'; Luan (yellow card) 88'; David 89' | Stadium: Allianz Parque; Attendance: 41,451; Referee: Anderson Daronco (Rio Grande do Sul) |

=== Supercopa do Brasil ===
Palmeiras qualified for the 2023 Supercopa do Brasil by winning the 2022 Campeonato Brasileiro Série A.

| 28 January 2023 | Palmeiras (São Paulo (state)) | 4–3 | (Rio de Janeiro (state)) Flamengo | Brasília |
| 16:30 UTC−3 | Raphael Veiga 38', 58' (pen.); Gabriel Menino 45+4', 74', (yellow card) 45+7' | Report | Gabriel 26' (pen.), 51', (yellow card) 27'; David Luiz (yellow card) 37'; Pedro 61', (yellow card) 90+9'; Éverton Ribeiro (yellow card) 90+6'; Marinho (yellow card) 90+7' | Stadium: Estádio Nacional Mané Garrincha; Attendance: 56,095; Referee: Wilton Pereira Sampaio (Goiás) |

== Statistics ==
=== Overall statistics ===
| Games played | 73 (16 Campeonato Paulista, 12 Copa Libertadores, 38 Série A, 6 Copa do Brasil, 1 Supercopa do Brasil) |
| Games won | 41 (11 Campeonato Paulista, 7 Copa Libertadores, 20 Série A, 2 Copa do Brasil, 1 Supercopa do Brasil) |
| Games drawn | 19 (4 Campeonato Paulista, 4 Copa Libertadores, 10 Série A, 1 Copa do Brasil, 0 Supercopa do Brasil) |
| Games lost | 13 (1 Campeonato Paulista, 1 Copa Libertadores, 8 Série A, 3 Copa do Brasil, 0 Supercopa do Brasil) |
| Goals scored | 124 |
| Goals conceded | 57 |
| Goal difference | +67 (+18 Campeonato Paulista, +15 Copa Libertadores, +31 Série A, +2 Copa do Brasil, +1 Supercopa do Brasil) |
| Clean sheets | 36 |
| Most clean sheets | Weverton (35) |
| Best result | 5–0 (vs. Goiás, Série A – May 7); 5–0 (vs. São Paulo, Série A – October 25) |
| Worst result | 0–3 (vs. Flamengo, Série A – November 8) |
| Yellow cards | 156 |
| Red cards | 7 |
| Top scorer | Raphael Veiga (18 goals) |

=== Goalscorers ===
In italic players who left the team in mid-season.

| Place | Position | Nationality | Number | Name | Campeonato Paulista | Copa Libertadores | Série A | Copa do Brasil | Supercopa do Brasil | Total |
|---|---|---|---|---|---|---|---|---|---|---|
| 1 | MF | (Brazil) | 23 | Raphael Veiga | 3 | 3 | 9 | 1 | 2 | 18 |
| 2 | FW | (Brazil) | 10 | Rony | 6 | 3 | 5 | 0 | 0 | 14 |
| 2 | FW | (Brazil) | 16 | Endrick | 2 | 1 | 11 | 0 | 0 | 14 |
| 3 | FW | (Brazil) | 14 | Artur | 0 | 5 | 5 | 0 | 0 | 10 |
| 4 | MF | (Brazil) | 25 | Gabriel Menino | 3 | 0 | 2 | 1 | 2 | 8 |
| 4 | DF | (Uruguay) | 22 | Piquerez | 1 | 3 | 3 | 1 | 0 | 8 |
| 4 | FW | (Argentina) | 18 | López | 1 | 1 | 5 | 1 | 0 | 8 |
| 4 | FW | (Brazil) | 19 | Breno Lopes | 2 | 0 | 5 | 1 | 0 | 8 |
| 5 | DF | (Paraguay) | 15 | Gómez | 0 | 3 | 2 | 1 | 0 | 6 |
| 6 | DF | (Brazil) | 26 | Murilo | 2 | 0 | 3 | 0 | 0 | 5 |
| 7 | FW | (Brazil) | 29 | Rafael Navarro | 1 | 1 | 1 | 1 | 0 | 4 |
| 8 | FW | (Brazil) | 7 | Dudu | 0 | 0 | 3 | 0 | 0 | 3 |
| 8 | MF | (Colombia) | 27 | Ríos | 0 | 0 | 2 | 1 | 0 | 3 |
| 8 | MF | (Brazil) | 8 | Zé Rafael | 0 | 0 | 3 | 0 | 0 | 3 |
| 9 | MF | (Brazil) | 11 | Bruno Tabata | 1 | 0 | 0 | 1 | 0 | 2 |
| 9 | DF | (Brazil) | 12 | Mayke | 0 | 1 | 1 | 0 | 0 | 2 |
| 9 | DF | (Brazil) | 2 | Marcos Rocha | 0 | 1 | 1 | 0 | 0 | 2 |
| 10 | MF | (Colombia) | 20 | Atuesta | 1 | 0 | 0 | 0 | 0 | 1 |
| 10 | FW | (Brazil) | 17 | Giovani | 1 | 0 | 0 | 0 | 0 | 1 |
| 10 | DF | (Brazil) | 13 | Luan | 0 | 0 | 1 | 0 | 0 | 1 |
