= Rony (footballer) =

Brazilian footballer (born 1995)

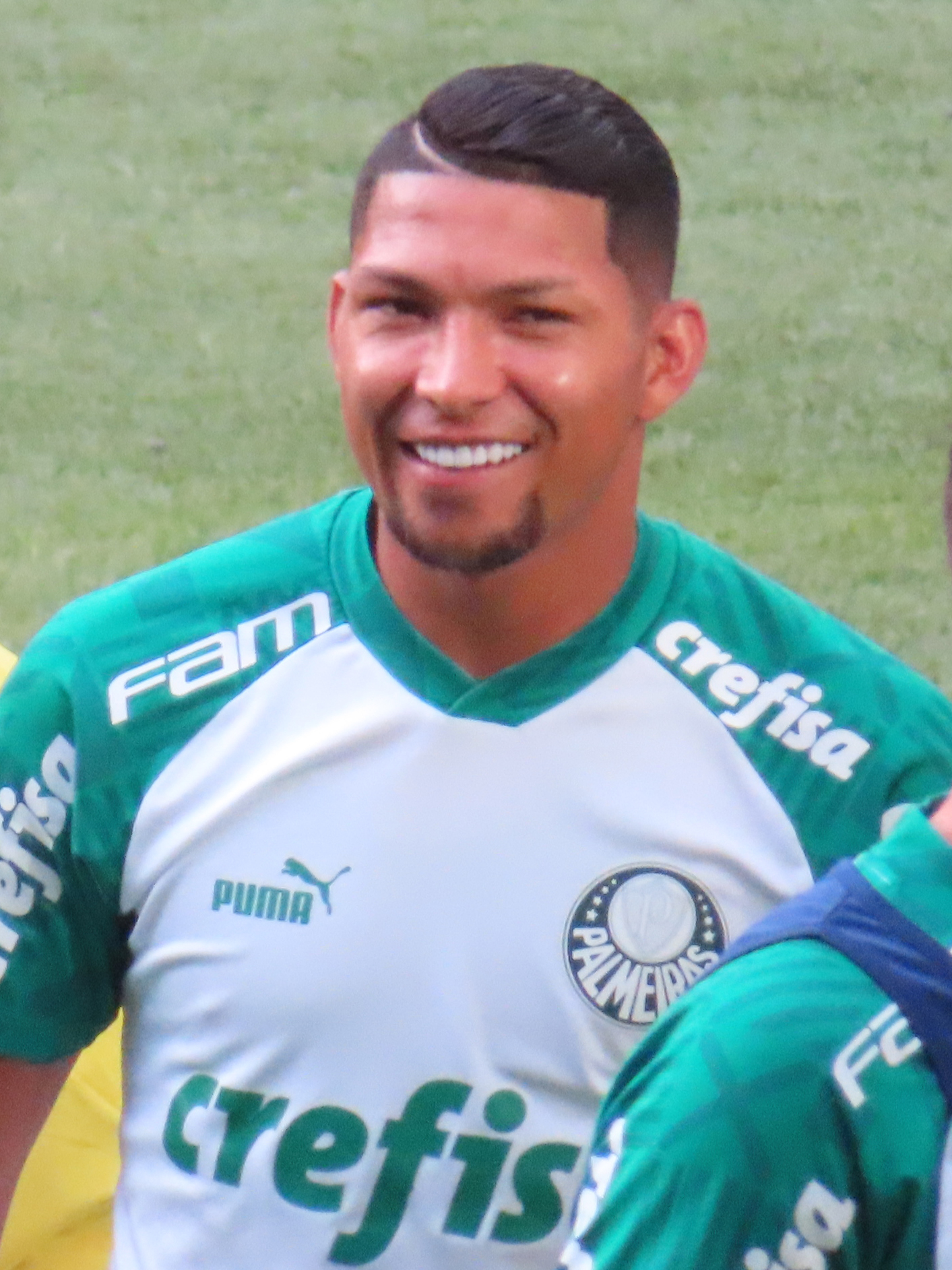
- Rony in 2024

Personal information
- Full name: Ronielson da Silva Barbosa
- Date of birth: 11 May 1995 (age 31)
- Place of birth: Magalhães Barata, Brazil
- Height: 1.67 m (5 ft 5 1/2 in)
- Position: Forward

Team information
- Current team: Santos
- Number: 33

Youth career
- Remo
- 2015: Cruzeiro

Senior career*
Years	Team	Apps	(Gls)
2014–2015	Remo	24	(4)
2015–2018	Cruzeiro	0	(0)
2016	→ Náutico (loan)	49	(14)
2017	→ Albirex Niigata (loan)	32	(7)
2018–2020	Athletico Paranaense	45	(9)
2020–2025	Palmeiras	204	(44)
2025–2026	Atlético Mineiro	42	(9)
2026–	Santos	34	(2)

International career^{‡}
2023	Brazil	3	(0)
- * Club domestic league appearances and goals as of 17:33, 19 November 2026 (UTC) ‡ National team caps and goals as of 20 June 2023

Ronielson da Silva Barbosa (born 11 May 1995), commonly known as Rony, is a Brazilian footballer who plays for Santos. Mainly a forward, he can also play as a winger.

== Club career ==
=== Remo ===
Born in Vila Quadros, the rural part of the city of Magalhães Barata, in the state of Pará, Rony began his career with the youth sides of Remo. Released by the club in 2013, his contract was still registered in the BID (CBF's registration system), which led to the club recalling him to play in the 2014 Copa São Paulo de Futebol Júnior; at that time, he was working as a motorcycle courier.

Rony was promoted to the first team of Remo after the Copinha, and made his senior debut on 26 March 2024; after coming on as a substitute for Leandrão, he scored the equalizer in a 1–1 Campeonato Paraense home draw against São Francisco-PA. He would feature regularly in the year, scoring two further goals in the 2014 Campeonato Paraense as the club lifted the trophy.

=== Cruzeiro and loan to Náutico ===
On 22 April 2015, Rony moved to Cruzeiro on a three-year contract, for a rumoured fee of R$ 321,000. He only featured for the under-20 side, before being loaned out to Náutico on 7 January 2016.

Rony established himself as a first-choice at Timbu, and scored 11 goals in the 2016 Série B.

=== Albirex Niigata ===
On 9 January 2017, Albirex Niigata announced that they had signed Rony from Cruzeiro, for a fee of around R$ 4 million. He made his debut abroad on 25 February, starting in a 1–1 away draw against Sanfrecce Hiroshima, and scored his first goal on 18 March, in a draw at Yokohama F. Marinos for the same scoreline.

==== Contract disputes with Cruzeiro ====
On 11 January 2018, Rony was announced at Botafogo, after agreeing to a two-year deal. Three days later, Albirex notified Cruzeiro demanding the return of Rony or the transfer of a US$ 10 million fee on compensation; the deal later collapsed, and he terminated his contract with Cruzeiro on 2 April.

In April 2018, Rony negotiated with Corinthians, but Albirex notified the player of abandonment and the deal also collapsed. He was only given clearance by FIFA to negotiate in May.

=== Athletico Paranaense ===
On 31 August 2018, after spending nearly two months training at the club, Atlético Paranaense received FIFA clearance to sign Rony. He made his club debut two days later, replacing Marcinho and scoring his team's second in a 2–0 home win over Bahia.

Rony established himself as a starter for Furacão during the 2019 campaign, heping the club to win their first-ever Copa do Brasil title. On 19 January 2020, after refusing a renewal offer, he was separated from the first team squad.

=== Palmeiras ===
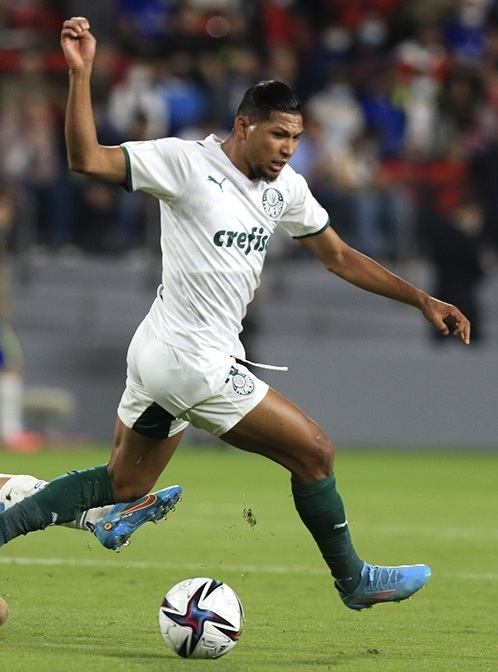
Rony with Palmeiras at the 2021 FIFA Club World Cup

On 21 February 2020, Rony joined Palmeiras on a deal until 2024. He made his debut for the club eight days later, replacing Luiz Adriano in a 0–0 Campeonato Paulista away draw against Santos.

Rony only scored his first goal for Verdão on 1 October 2020, netting the club's fifth in a 5–0 home routing of Bolívar, in the 2020 Copa Libertadores. He was an important unit in the club's title in the competition, scoring a further four goals and providing eight assists (including one to Breno Lopes' goal in the final against Santos).

On 26 June 2021, already established as a starter, Rony renewed his contract with Palmeiras for a further year. In April 2022, after scoring against Emelec, he reached 13 goals for the club in the Libertadores, becoming their top scorer in the competition.

On 12 October 2022, Rony renewed his link with Palmeiras until 2026; he also received a pay rise.

=== Atlético Mineiro ===
On 14 February 2025, Rony joined Atlético Mineiro on a deal running until December 2027. In July, he went to court against the club to rescind his link after alleging unpaid wages, but withdrew the action shortly after, after reaching an agreement with the club.

=== Santos ===
On 30 January 2026, Rony joined Santos on a three-year contract for a rumoured fee of € 3 million. He became the fourth former Palmeiras player to join the club within a year, joining former teammates Zé Rafael, Mayke and Gabriel Menino.

Rony made his club debut on 31 January 2026, replacing Miguel Terceros in the first half of a 2–0 away loss to São Paulo, and scored his first goal eight days later, netting the winner in a 2–1 away success over Noroeste.

== International career ==
On 3 March 2023, Rony was called for the first time for the Brazil national team by interim head coach Ramon Menezes to play in a friendly match against Morocco on 25 March 2023. He made his full international debut on 25 March, starting in the 2–1 loss at the Ibn Batouta Stadium in Tangier, Algeria.

== Career statistics ==
=== Club ===
As of 19 November 2026

Appearances and goals by club, season and competition
Club	Season	League			State League		Cup		Continental		Other		Total	
Club	Season	Division	Apps	Goals	Apps	Goals	Apps	Goals	Apps	Goals	Apps	Goals	Apps	Goals
Remo	2014	Série D	10	1	10	3	—		—		—		20	4
Remo	2015	Série D	0	0	4	0	2	0	—		5 (Note: Appearance(s) in Copa Verde)	2	11	2
Remo	Total		10	1	14	3	2	0	—		5	2	31	6
Náutico	2016	Série B	35	11	14	3	2	0	—		0	0	51	14
Albirex Niigata	2017	J1 League	32	7	—		2	1	—		2 (Note: Appearance(s) in J.League Cup)	0	36	8
Athletico Paranaense	2018	Série A	15	3	—		—		8 (Note: Appearance(s) in Copa Sudamericana)	1	—		23	4
Athletico Paranaense	2019	Série A	30	6	—		8	2	8 (Note: Appearance(s) in Copa Libertadores)	0	3 (Note: Two appearances in Recopa Sudamericana, one appearance and one goal in J.League Cup / Copa Sudamericana Championship)	1	49	9
Athletico Paranaense	2020	Série A	—		—		—		—		1 (Note: Appearance(s) in Supercopa do Brasil)	0	1	0
Athletico Paranaense	Total		45	9	—		8	2	16	1	4	1	73	13
Palmeiras	2020	Série A	23	5	9	0	7	1	11	5	2 (Note: Appearance(s) in FIFA Club World Cup)	0	52	11
Palmeiras	2021	Série A	25	4	6	1	2	0	10	6	5 (Note: One appearance in Supercopa do Brasil, two appearances and one goal in Recopa Sudamericana, two appearances in FIFA Club World Cup)	1	48	12
Palmeiras	2022	Série A	33	12	13	4	3	0	10	7	2 (Note: Appearance(s) in Recopa Sudamericana)	0	61	23
Palmeiras	2023	Série A	30	5	14	6	4	0	10	3	1	0	59	14
Palmeiras	2024	Série A	35	4	15	3	4	1	8	2	1	0	63	10
Palmeiras	2025	Série A	—		1	0	—		—		—		1	0
Palmeiras	Total		146	39	58	5	20	2	49	23	11	1	284	70
Atlético Mineiro	2025	Série A	35	6	4	2	8	3	15	2	—		62	13
Atlético Mineiro	2026	Série A	0	0	3	1	—		—		—		3	1
Atlético Mineiro	Total		35	6	7	3	8	3	15	2	—		65	14
Santos	2026	Série A	30	1	4	1	5	1	9	2	—		48	5
Career total			333	74	97	15	47	9	89	28	22	4	588	130

=== International ===
As of 5 December 2024

Appearances and goals by national team and year
National team	Year	Apps	Goals
Brazil	2023	3	0
Total		3	0

== Honours ==
=== Club ===
Remo

- Campeonato Paraense: 2014, 2015

Athletico Paranaense

- Copa do Brasil: 2019
- Copa Sudamericana: 2018
- J.League Cup / Copa Sudamericana Championship: 2019

Palmeiras

- Copa do Brasil: 2020
- Campeonato Paulista: 2020, 2022, 2023, 2024
- Copa Libertadores: 2020, 2021
- Recopa Sudamericana: 2022
- Campeonato Brasileiro: 2022, 2023
- Supercopa do Brasil: 2023
- FIFA Club World Cup Runner Up: 2021

Atlético Mineiro

- Campeonato Mineiro: 2025

=== Individual ===
- Copa Libertadores Dream Team: 2020, 2021
- Copa do Brasil Team of the Final: 2019, 2020
- South American Team of the Year: 2020
- Best Forward in Brazil: 2022
- Campeonato Paulista Team of the Year: 2021, 2023
