= Vanderlan =

Brazilian footballer (born 2002)

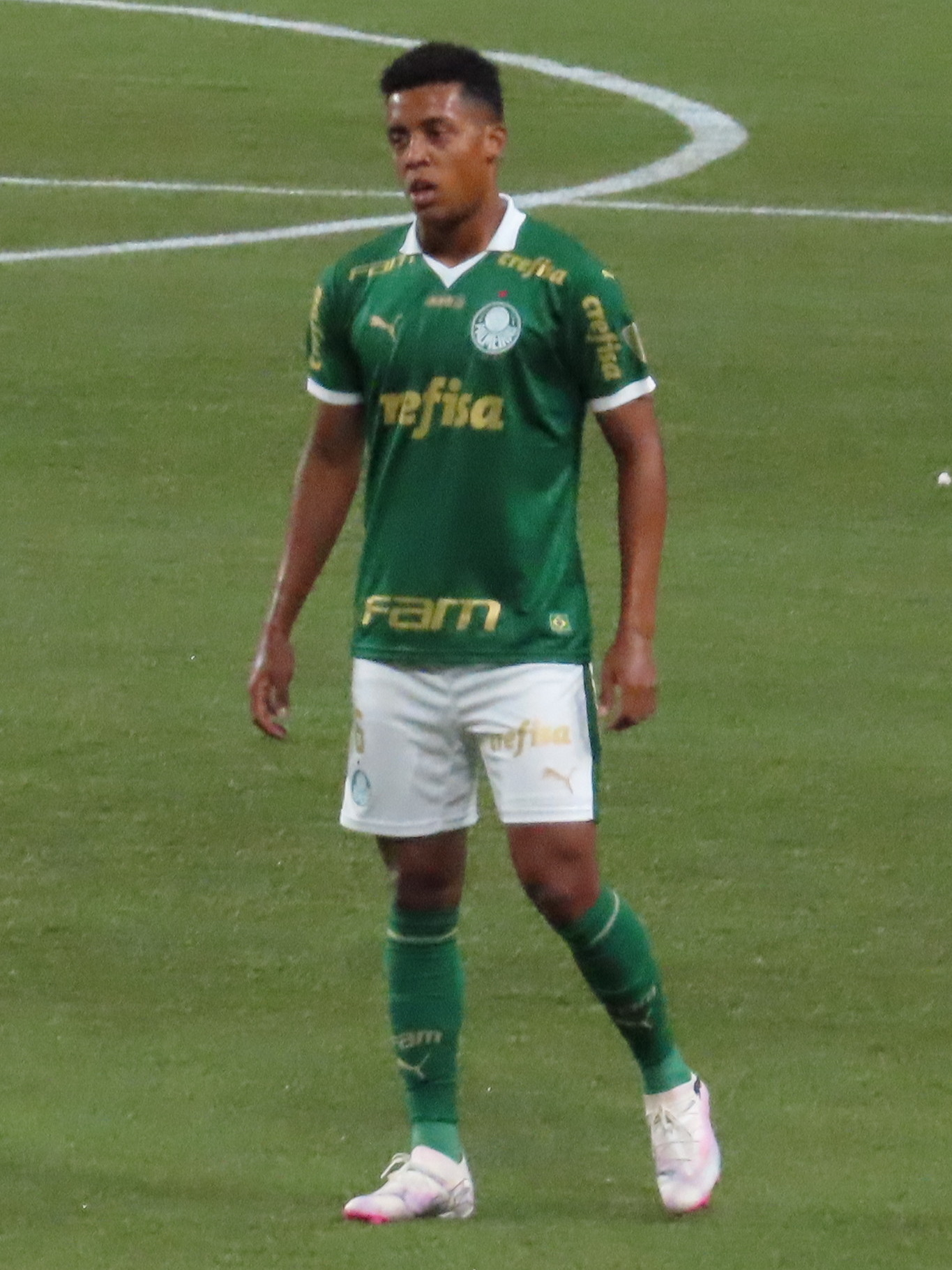

Personal information
- Full name: Vanderlan Barbosa da Silva
- Date of birth: 7 September 2002 (age 24)
- Place of birth: Brumado, Brazil
- Height: 1.83 m (6 ft 0 in)
- Position: Left back

Team information
- Current team: RB Bragantino
- Number: 12

Youth career
- 2015–2017: Jacuipense
- 2017–2022: Palmeiras

Senior career*
Years	Team	Apps	(Gls)
2020–2025	Palmeiras	86	(1)
2025–	RB Bragantino	14	(0)
- * Club domestic league appearances and goals as of 7 April 2026

Vanderlan Barbosa da Silva (born 7 September 2002), simply known as Vanderlan, is a Brazilian footballer who currently plays as a left back for RB Bragantino.

== Club career ==
Born in Brumado, Bahia, Vanderlan joined Palmeiras' youth setup in 2017. In January 2021, he signed his first professional contract with the club, until 2024.

Vanderlan made his first team – and Série A – debut on 26 January 2021, coming on as a second-half substitute for Lucas Lima in a 1–1 home draw against Vasco da Gama.

== Career statistics ==
As of 25 November 2024.

Club	Season	League			State League		Cup		Continental		Other		Total	
Club	Season	Division	Apps	Goals	Apps	Goals	Apps	Goals	Apps	Goals	Apps	Goals	Apps	Goals
Palmeiras	2020	Série A	2	0	0	0	0	0	0	0	—		2	0
Palmeiras	2021	Série A	3	0	3	0	0	0	1 (Note: Appearance(s) in Copa Libertadores)	0	0	0	7	0
Palmeiras	2022	Série A	13	1	1	0	0	0	2	0	0	0	16	1
Palmeiras	2023	Série A	14	0	2	0	0	0	0	0	0	0	16	0
Career total			32	1	6	0	0	0	3	0	0	0	41	1

== Honours ==
Palmeiras

- Copa Libertadores: 2020, 2021
- Recopa Sudamericana: 2022
- Campeonato Paulista: 2022, 2023, 2024
- Campeonato Brasileiro Série A: 2022, 2023
- Supercopa do Brasil: 2023
