= Marcos Rocha =

Brazilian footballer (born 1988)

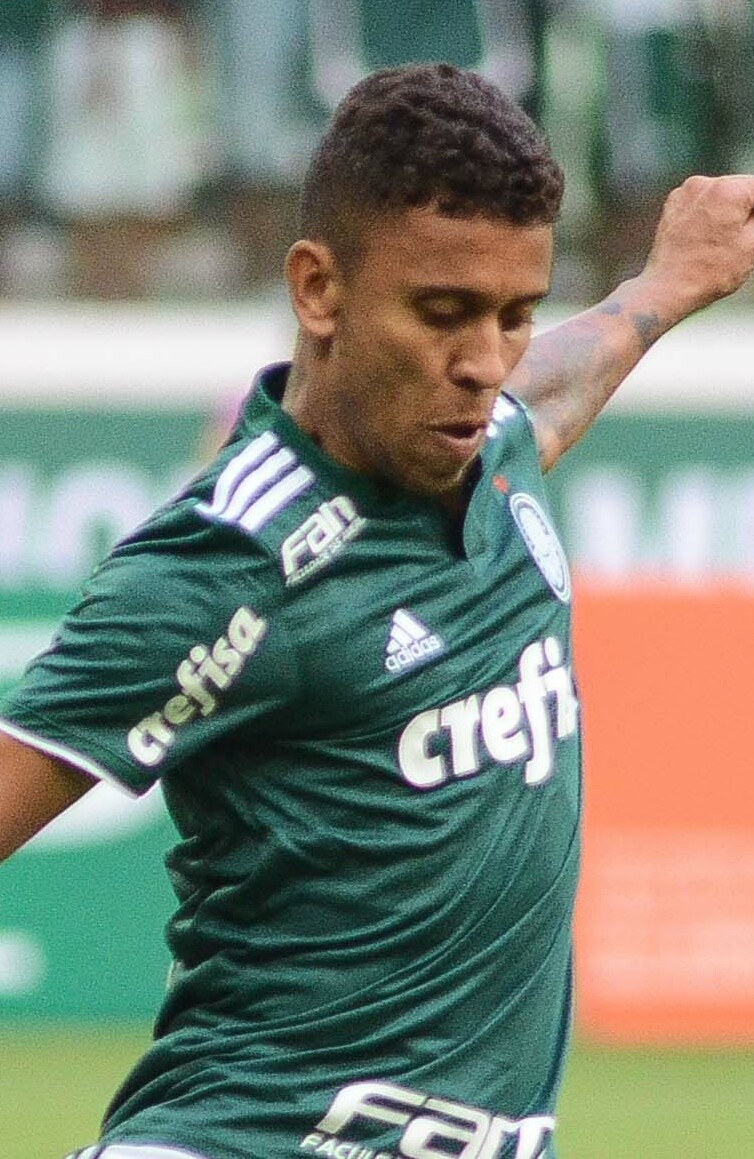
- Marcos Rocha playing for Palmeiras in 2018

Personal information
- Full name: Marcos Luis Rocha Aquino
- Date of birth: 11 December 1988 (age 37)
- Place of birth: Sete Lagoas, Brazil
- Height: 1.76 m (5 ft 9 in)
- Position: Right-back

Team information
- Current team: Grêmio
- Number: 14

Youth career
- 2005: Bela Vista
- 2005–2008: Atlético Mineiro

Senior career*
Years	Team	Apps	(Gls)
2008–2019	Atlético Mineiro	227	(10)
2008	→ Uberlândia (loan)	9	(0)
2008	→ CRB (loan)	27	(3)
2010	→ Ponte Preta (loan)	9	(0)
2010–2011	→ América Mineiro (loan)	68	(5)
2018	→ Palmeiras (loan)	34	(1)
2019–2025	Palmeiras	221	(6)
2025–	Grêmio	19	(0)

International career^{‡}
2013	Brazil	2	(0)
- * Club domestic league appearances and goals as of 7 April 2026 ‡ National team caps and goals as of 07:59, 24 February 2023 (UTC)

Marcos Luis Rocha Aquino (born 11 December 1988) is a Brazilian professional footballer who plays as a right-back for Campeonato Brasileiro Série A club Grêmio.

== Club career ==
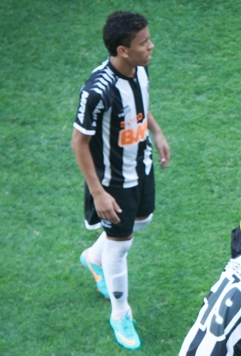
Marcos Rocha with Atlético Mineiro in 2012

Born in Sete Lagoas, Minas Gerais, Marcos Rocha joined Atlético Mineiro's youth setup in 2005, from hometown's Bela Vista FC. He was promoted to the main squad in 2008, but made his senior debuts while on loan at Uberlândia EC.

Marcos Rocha made his professional debuts late in the year, representing CRB also in a temporary deal. He returned to Atlético in January 2009, mainly as a backup to Sheslon; after the latter's injury he made his debut for Galo, starting in a 3–0 away win against Social on 7 February 2009, for the Campeonato Mineiro championship.

Marcos Rocha made his Série A debut on 16 May 2009, replacing Jonílson in the 82nd minute of a 2–1 home win against Grêmio. He appeared in ten matches during the campaign, scoring once (against Avaí on 20 August).

On 25 February 2010, Marcos Rocha was loaned to Ponte Preta. After appearing sparingly he moved to América Mineiro, featuring regularly over the course of nearly two years.

On 30 November 2011, it was confirmed that Marcos Rocha would return to Atlético. He was immediately elected as first-choice, and was among the squad which won the state league twice, the Copa Libertadores in 2013, and the Recopa Sudamericana and Copa do Brasil in 2014.

On 10 January 2019, Marcos Rocha signed a four-year contract with Palmeiras.

== Career statistics ==
=== Club ===
As of 28 May 2024

Appearances and goals by club, season and competition
Club	Season	League			State League		National cup		Continental		Other		Total	
Club	Season	Division	Apps	Goals	Apps	Goals	Apps	Goals	Apps	Goals	Apps	Goals	Apps	Goals
Atlético Mineiro	2009	Série A	10	1	9	0	2	1	1 (Note: Appearance(s) in Copa Sudamericana)	0	—		22	2
Atlético Mineiro	2012	Série A	34	1	13	2	4	0	—		—		51	3
Atlético Mineiro	2013	Série A	29	2	13	1	2	2	13 (Note: Appearance(s) in Copa Libertadores)	0	2 (Note: Appearance(s) in FIFA Club World Cup)	0	59	5
Atlético Mineiro	2014	Série A	20	0	8	0	6	0	6	0	2 (Note: Appearance(s) in Recopa Sudamericana)	0	42	0
Atlético Mineiro	2015	Série A	22	2	8	1	2	0	3	0	—		35	3
Atlético Mineiro	2016	Série A	15	0	10	0	3	0	10	0	1 (Note: Appearance(s) in Primeira Liga)	0	39	0
Atlético Mineiro	2017	Série A	21	0	14	0	3	0	7	0	4	0	49	0
Atlético Mineiro	2010	Série B	28	3	—		—		—		—		28	3
Atlético Mineiro	2011	Série A	30	2	10	0	—		—		—		40	2
Atlético Mineiro	Total		209	11	85	4	22	3	40	0	9	0	365	18
CRB (loan)	2008	Série B	27	3	—		—		—		—		27	3
Ponte Preta (loan)	2010	Série A	0	0	9	0	3	0	—		—		12	0
Palmeiras (loan)	2018	Série A	20	1	14	0	5	0	3	0	—		42	1
Palmeiras	2019	Série A	30	2	7	0	2	0	7	1	—		46	3
Palmeiras	2020	Série A	22	0	12	2	6	0	9	0	1	0	50	2
Palmeiras	2021	Série A	22	0	1	0	1	0	10	1	4 (Note: Two appearances in Recopa Sudamericana, one appearance in Supercopa do Brasil)	0	38	1
Palmeiras	2022	Série A	28	0	10	0	4	0	8	0	2 (Note: Two appearances in Recopa Sudamericana, one appearance in Supercopa do Brasil)	0	52	0
Palmeiras	2023	Série A	20	1	13	0	3	0	6	1	1	0	43	2
Palmeiras	2024	Série A	28	0	14	0	2	0	6	0	1	0	51	0
Palmeiras	2025	Série A	0	0	11	0	0	0	0	0	0	0	11	0
Palmeiras	Total		150	3	68	2	18	0	46	3	9	0	291	8
Career total			406	18	176	6	48	3	89	3	18	0	737	30

=== International ===
As of 6 December 2021

Appearances and goals by national team and year
National team	Year	Apps	Goals
Brazil	2013	2	0
Total		2	0

== Honours ==
Atlético Mineiro

- Campeonato Mineiro: 2012, 2013, 2015, 2017
- Copa Libertadores: 2013
- Recopa Sudamericana: 2014
- Copa do Brasil: 2014

Palmeiras

- Campeonato Brasileiro Série A: 2018, 2022, 2023
- Campeonato Paulista: 2020, 2022, 2023, 2024
- Copa Libertadores: 2020, 2021
- Recopa Sudamericana: 2022
- Copa do Brasil: 2020
- Supercopa do Brasil: 2023

Grêmio

- Campeonato Gaúcho: 2026

Individual

- Bola de Prata: 2012, 2014, 2022
- Troféu Guara: 2010, 2011, 2012, 2013, 2014, 2015 e 2016
- Troféu Globo Minas: 2013, 2015, 2016 e 2017
- Campeonato Mineiro Team of the year: 2010, 2011, 2016 e 2017
- Best Right-back in Brazil: 2014, 2019
- Campeonato Brasileiro Série A Team of the Year: 2012, 2013, 2014, 2015, 2022
- South American Team of the Year: 2013
- Campeonato Paulista Team of the Year: 2018
