= Joaquín Piquerez =

Uruguayan footballer (born 1998)

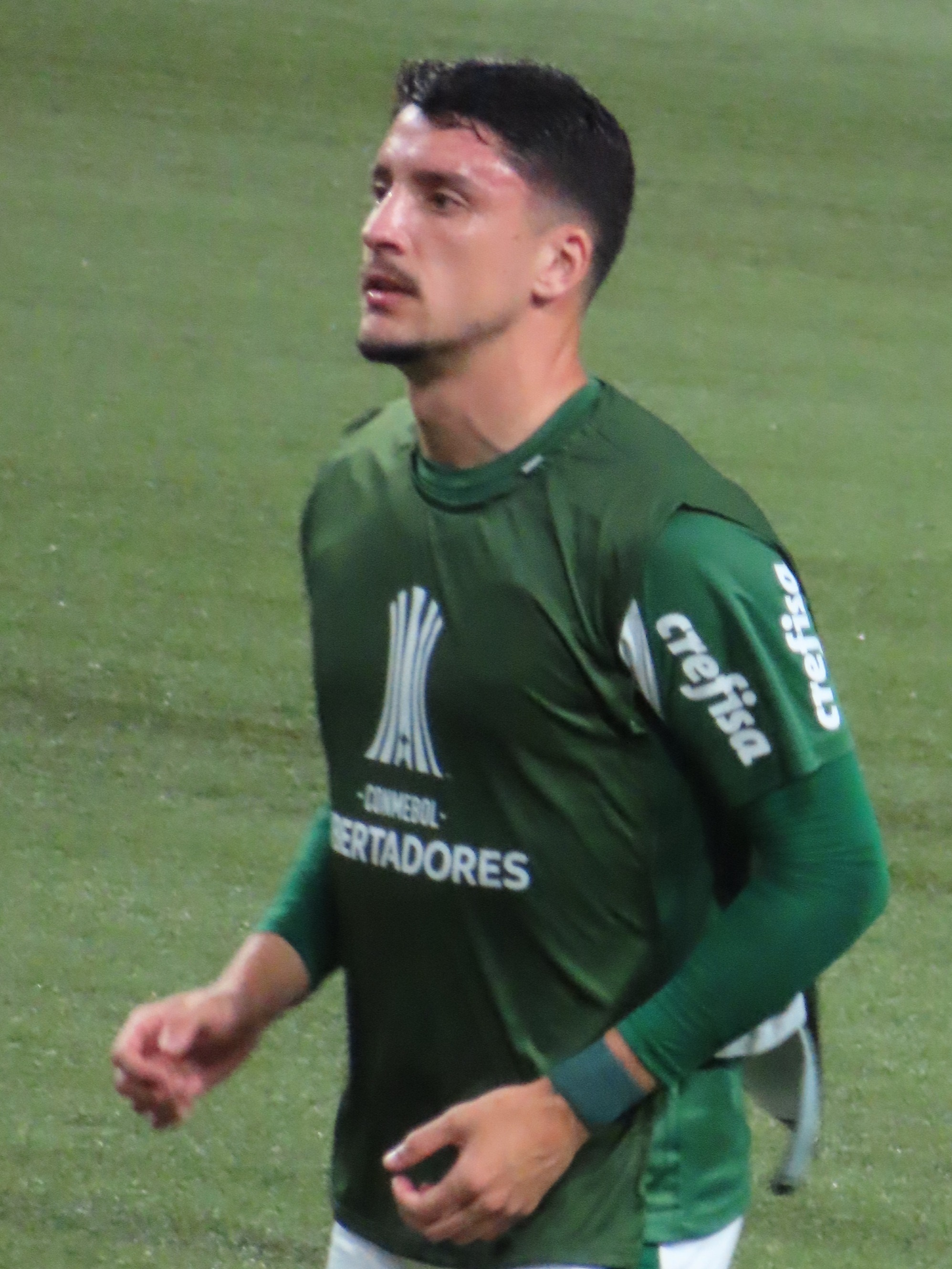
- Piquerez with Palmeiras in 2024

Personal information
- Full name: Joaquín Piquerez Moreira
- Date of birth: 24 August 1998 (age 28)
- Place of birth: Montevideo, Uruguay
- Height: 1.85 m (6 ft 1 in)
- Position: Left-back

Team information
- Current team: Palmeiras
- Number: 22

Youth career
- Defensor Sporting

Senior career*
Years	Team	Apps	(Gls)
2017–2019	Defensor Sporting	25	(0)
2019–2020	River Plate Montevideo	20	(2)
2020–2021	Peñarol	37	(0)
2021–	Palmeiras	186	(11)

International career^{‡}
2014–2015	Uruguay U17	17	(0)
2019	Uruguay U22	4	(0)
2020	Uruguay U23	9	(0)
2021–	Uruguay	23	(0)
- * Club domestic league appearances and goals as of 28 October 2026 ‡ National team caps and goals as of 14 November 2026

Joaquín Piquerez Moreira (born 24 August 1998) is a Uruguayan professional footballer who plays as a left-back for Campeonato Brasileiro Série A club Palmeiras and the Uruguay national team.

== Club career ==
=== Defensor Sporting ===
Piquerez played in the youth ranks of the club Defensor Sporting, with which he debuted in the Uruguayan First Division on March 19, 2017 with Eduardo Acevedo as coach in a match against River Plate that ended in a 1–0 victory. In May, he won the Apertura tournament.

=== River Plate ===
Piquerez joined River Plate Montevideo, signing a two-year contract. He made his debut for his new club on July 14, in a 0–0 draw with Progreso in the Torneo Intermedio. In August, in the same tournament, Piquerez scored his first goal for River Plate in a 1–1 draw against Nacional. River Plate reached the final of the Torneo Intermedio in September, where they drew 2–2 with Liverpool, with Piquerez scoring River's first goal. However, Liverpool won 5–4 on penalties, and River Plate finished as runners-up.

=== Peñarol ===
In January 2020, Peñarol officially announced the signing of Piquerez. The club paid River Plate €300,000 (just under R$1.5 million at the time) for the transfer, and the left-back signed a three-year contract. Piquerez joined the Peñarol squad on February 12 and made his debut in a 1–2 loss to Defensor Sporting, for the Uruguayan Championship.

=== Palmeiras ===
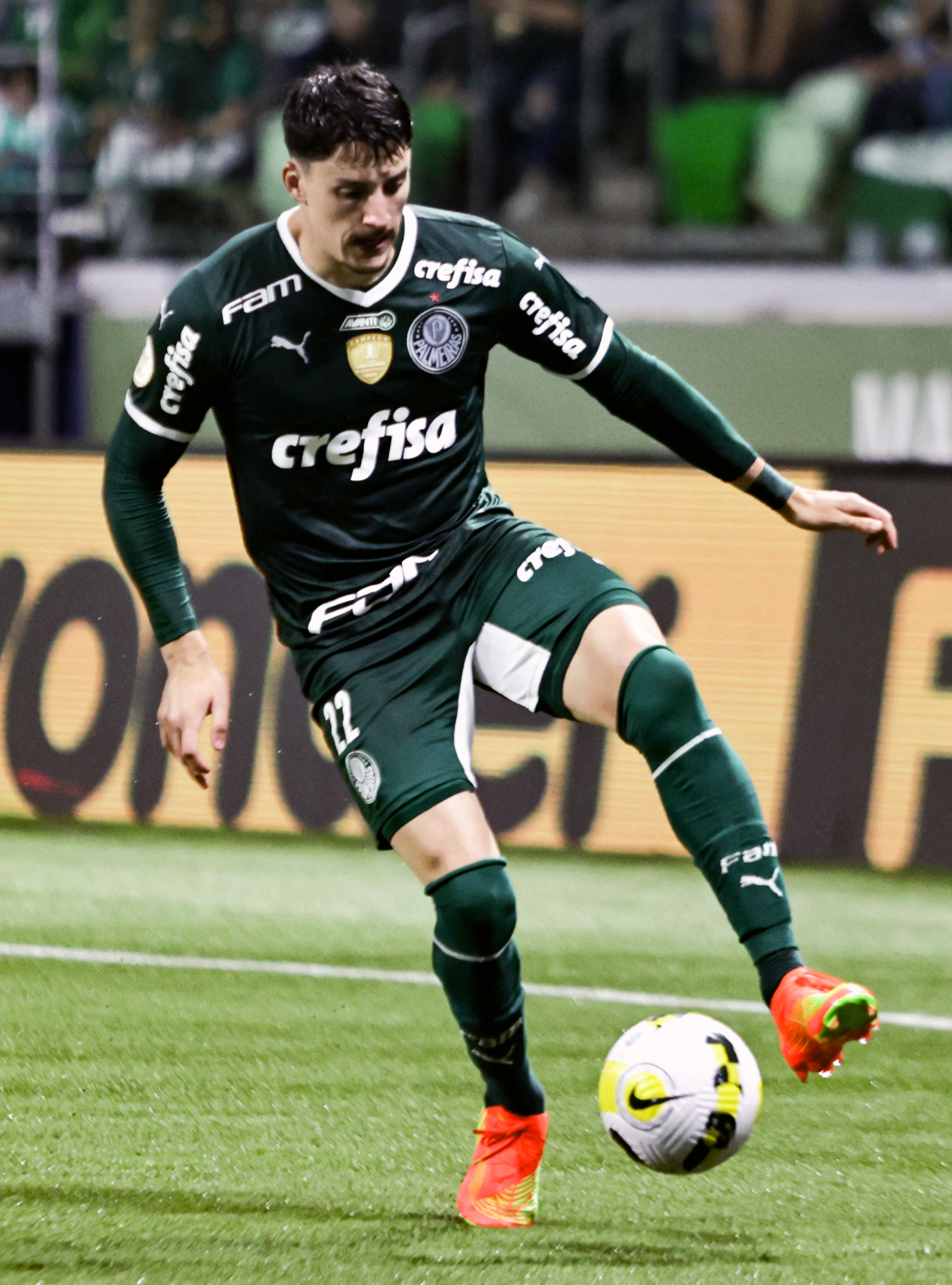
Piquerez for Palmeiras in 2022

On 31 July 2021, Brazilian club Palmeiras announced the signing of Piquerez on a permanent deal until 31 December 2025. In November, Piquerez won his first title with Palmeiras. He started in the Copa Libertadores de 2021 final against Flamengo, which Palmeiras won 2–1.

In the 2022 season, Piquerez established himself as team absolute starter. At the beginning of the year, he won the 2022 Recopa Sudamericana and the 2022 Campeonato Paulista. Three months later, in July, he scored his first goal for Palmeiras, opening the scoring in the second leg of the round of 16, against São Paulo, for the Copa do Brasil. In the same match, the full-back completed 100 appearances for Palmeiras for Palmeiras. In November, Piquerez won the Campeonato Brasileiro Série A 2022 and was named to Campeonato Brasileiro Série A Team of the Year. That following season, he won the 2023 Campeonato Paulista and the 2023 Campeonato Brasileiro Série A, being again a pillar of the team.

== International career ==
Piquerez has represented Uruguay at various youth levels. He was part of national team squads at the 2015 South American U-17 Championship and the 2019 Pan American Games. In December 2019, he was called up to under-23 team for the 2020 CONMEBOL Pre-Olympic Tournament.

Piquerez received his first call-up to the Uruguay national team on 28 May 2021 for FIFA World Cup qualification matches. However, he got injured the following day and was replaced by Camilo Cándido. He made his senior team debut on 2 September 2021 in a 1–1 draw against Peru. On 31 May 2026, he was named in Uruguay's 26-man squad for the 2026 FIFA World Cup.

== Career statistics ==
=== Club ===
As of match played 20 September 2025

Appearances and goals by club, season and competition
Club	Season	League			Paulista		Copa do Brasil		Continental		Other		Total	
Club	Season	Division	Apps	Goals	Apps	Goals	Apps	Goals	Apps	Goals	Apps	Goals	Apps	Goals
Palmeiras	2021	Série A	12	0	—		—		4 (Note: Appearances in Copa Libertadores)	0	2 (Note: Appearances in FIFA Club World Cup)	0	18	0
Palmeiras	2022	Série A	26	0	11	0	3	1	8	0	2 (Note: Appearances in Recopa Sudamericana)	0	50	1
Palmeiras	2023	Série A	29	3	13	1	5	1	10	3	1 (Note: Appearances in Supercopa do Brasil)	0	58	8
Palmeiras	2024	Série A	16	2	14	1	2	0	6	1	1	0	39	4
Palmeiras	2025	Série A	26	3	8	0	4	0	8	1	0	0	46	4
Career total			109	8	46	2	14	2	38	5	6	0	211	17

=== International ===
As of match played 13 November 2026

Appearances and goals by national team and year
National team	Year	Apps	Goals
Uruguay	2021	7	0
Uruguay	2023	6	0
Uruguay	2025	5	0
Uruguay	2026	5	0
Total		23	0

== Honours ==
=== Club ===
Palmeiras

- Série A: 2022, 2023
- Supercopa do Brasil: 2023
- Copa Libertadores: 2021
- Recopa Sudamericana: 2022
- Campeonato Paulista: 2022, 2023, 2024, 2026

=== Individual ===
- Uruguayan Primera División Team of the Year (bench): 2020
- Bola de Prata: 2022
- Campeonato Brasileiro Série A Team of the Year: 2022
- Best Left back in Brazil: 2022, 2023
- Copa Libertadores Team of the Tournament: 2023
- South America Team of the Year: 2023
