= Artur (footballer, born 1998) =

Brazilian footballer

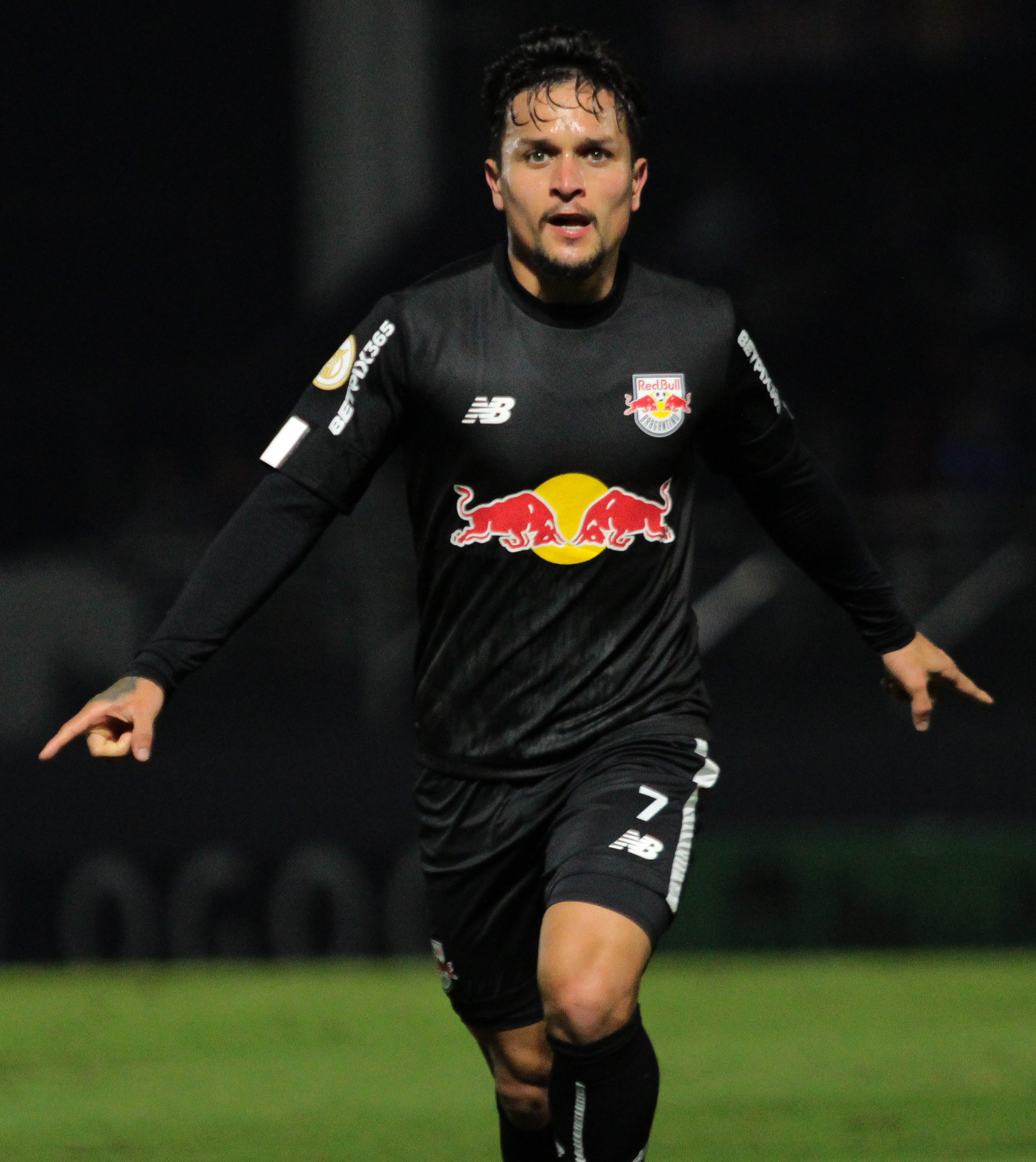

Personal information
- Full name: Artur Victor Guimarães
- Date of birth: 15 February 1998 (age 28)
- Place of birth: Fortaleza, Brazil
- Height: 1.63 m (5 ft 4 in)
- Position: Winger

Team information
- Current team: São Paulo (on loan from Botafogo)
- Number: 37

Youth career
- 2011–2015: Ceará
- 2015: → Palmeiras (loan)
- 2016: Palmeiras

Senior career*
Years	Team	Apps	(Gls)
2016–2019	Palmeiras	6	(0)
2017	→ Novorizontino (loan)	5	(0)
2017	→ Londrina (loan)	36	(8)
2019	→ Bahia (loan)	39	(8)
2020–2023	Red Bull Bragantino	145	(29)
2023	Palmeiras	37	(5)
2024–2025	Zenit Saint Petersburg	22	(4)
2025–	Botafogo	30	(5)
2026–	→ São Paulo (loan)	2	(0)

International career^{‡}
2016	Brazil U17		
2016–2018	Brazil U20	4	(0)
2019	Brazil U23	3	(0)
- * Club domestic league appearances and goals as of 6 April 2026 ‡ National team caps and goals as of 2 July 2024

Artur Victor Guimarães (born 15 February 1998), simply known as Artur, is a Brazilian professional footballer who plays as a winger for São Paulo on loan from Botafogo.

== Club career ==
=== Palmeiras ===
Born in Fortaleza, Ceará, Artur moved to Campo Maior, Piauí at the age of three, but returned to his hometown ten years later. He immediately joined Ceará's youth setup, and moved to Palmeiras in 2015. On 21 October 2016, he signed a new five-year contract with the latter club.

Artur made his first team – and Série A – debut on 11 December 2016, coming on as a late substitute for goalscorer Alecsandro in a 2–1 away win over Vitória, as his side was already champions.

=== Londrina ===
He was loaned to Londrina in the Série B.

=== Return to Palmeiras ===
Back to Palmeiras for the 2018 campaign, Artur renewed his contract until 2021 on 8 January 2018, and was assigned to the main squad. However, he featured rarely during the season, and moved on loan to Bahia on 4 January 2019.

=== Red Bull Bragantino ===
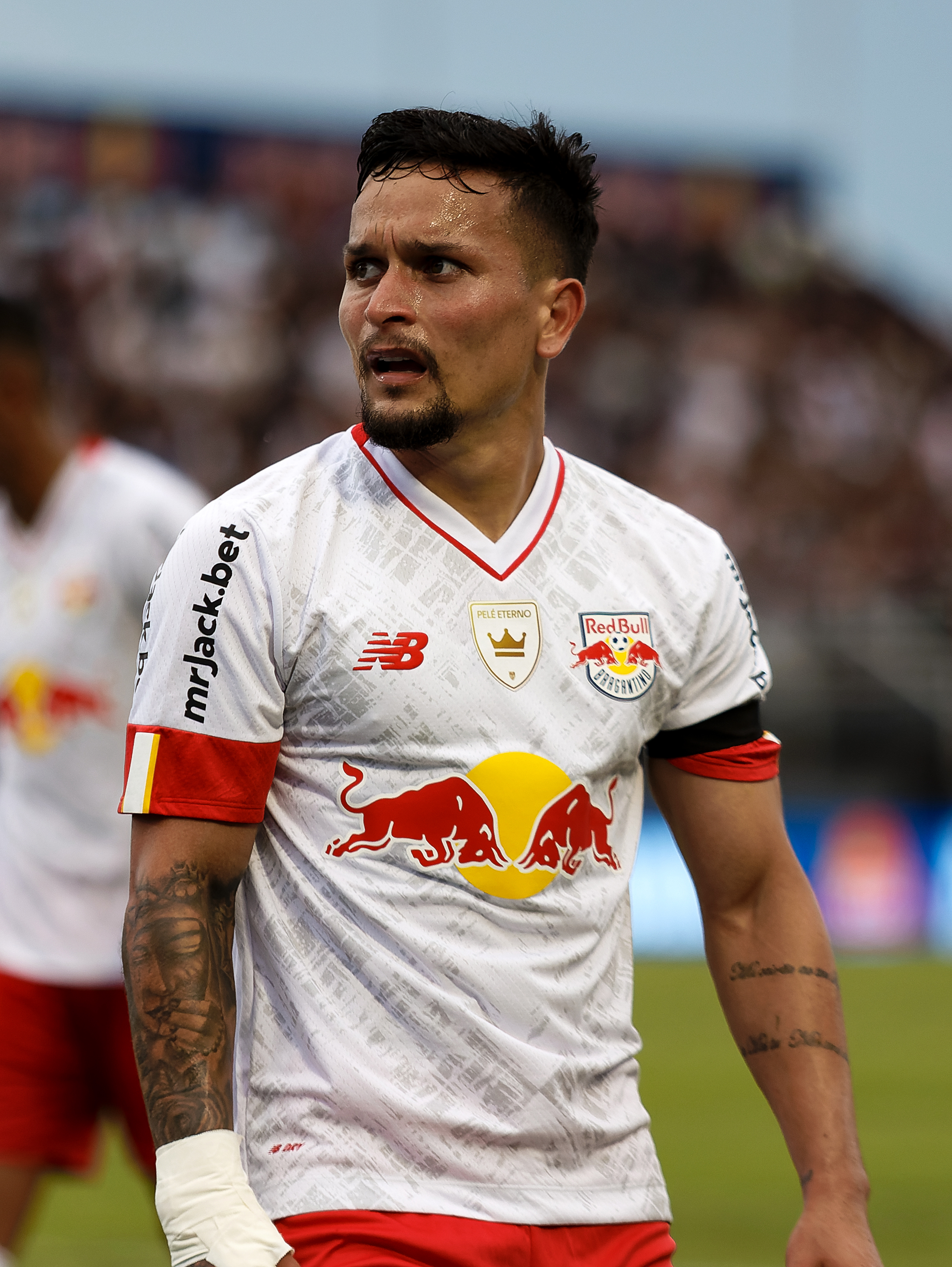
Artur with Red Bull Bragantino in 2023

On 8 January 2020, Artur was announced at Red Bull Bragantino on a five-year deal, for a club record R$ 25 million fee. He made his league debut for the club against Santos on 23 January 2020. He scored his first goal for the club against Oeste on 15 February 2020, scoring in the 25th minute.

On 22 September 2021, he scored from the penalty spot in Red Bull Bragantino's 2–0 win over Club Libertad in the first leg of their Copa Sudamericana semi-final tie. He repeated the feat in the second leg a week later, securing a 5–1 aggregate win, and a spot in the final of a major international competition for the first time in Bragantino history.

=== Second spell at Palmeiras ===
On 31 March 2023, Artur moved back to Palmeiras, for a reported transfer fee of €8 million (R$45 million), signing a contract until December 2027.

Artur made his league debut for Palmeiras against Cuiabá on 15 April 2023. He scored his first goal for the club against Vasco da Gama on 23 April 2023, scoring in the 62nd minute.

He scored 10 goals in 43 competitions for Verdão, and earned his third Série A medal as Palmeiras were crowned champions.

=== Zenit Saint Petersburg ===
On 8 January 2024, Artur signed a three-and-a-half-year contract with Russian Premier League club Zenit Saint Petersburg, with an option for a further year. Palmeiras received a reported €15 million transfer fee.

On 13 April 2024, Artur came on as a half-time substitute and scored a winning goal in a key 2–1 Zenit comeback victory over second-placed Krasnodar, which increased Zenit's lead over Krasnodar to 4 points.

On the last match day of the 2023–24 season, Artur came on as a substitute in the 74th minute of a game against Rostov and scored the winning goal in a 2–1 comeback victory that secured the sixth consecutive title for Zenit.

=== Botafogo ===
On 20 January 2025, Russian champions Zenit St. Petersburg announced the transfer of Luiz Henrique to Zenit, with Artur moving in the opposite direction, following by Wendel also moving to Botafogo at the end of the 2024–25 Russian season.

==== Loan to São Paulo ====
On 27 March 2026, on the last day of the transfer window, São Paulo made a deal of loan with Botafogo.

== International career ==
After representing Brazil at under-20 and under-23 levels, Artur was called up to the full side in September 2021, for two FIFA World Cup qualifying matches against Argentina and Peru.

== Career statistics ==
As of match played 1 December 2024

Appearances and goals by club, season and competition
Club	Season	League			State league (Note: Includes Campeonato Paulista, Campeonato Baiano)		National cup (Note: Includes Copa do Brasil, Russian Cup)		Continental		Other		Total	
Club	Season	Division	Apps	Goals	Apps	Goals	Apps	Goals	Apps	Goals	Apps	Goals	Apps	Goals
Palmeiras	2016	Série A	1	0	0	0	0	0	0	0	—		1	0
Palmeiras	2018	Série A	5	0	0	0	2	0	0	0	—		7	0
Palmeiras	Total		6	0	0	0	2	0	0	0	—		8	0
Novorizontino (loan)	2017	—			5	0	—		—		—		5	0
Londrina (loan)	2017	Série B	36	8	0	0	0	0	—		3 (Note: Appearances in Primeira Liga)	0	39	8
Bahia (loan)	2019	Série A	32	7	7	1	9	1	2 (Note: Appearances in Copa Sudamericana)	0	7 (Note: Appearances in Copa do Nordeste)	1	57	10
Red Bull Bragantino	2020	Série A	33	1	12	3	2	0	—		—		47	4
Red Bull Bragantino	2021	Série A	30	12	11	0	4	2	13	7	—		58	21
Red Bull Bragantino	2022	Série A	33	6	12	4	1	0	3 (Note: Appearances in Copa Libertadores)	0	—		49	10
Red Bull Bragantino	2023	Série A	0	0	14	3	2	0	—		—		16	3
Red Bull Bragantino	Total		96	19	49	10	9	2	16	7	—		170	38
Palmeiras	2023	Série A	31	5	0	0	0	0	12	5	0	0	43	10
Zenit Saint Petersburg	2023–24	Russian Premier League	11	3	—		6	0	—		0	0	17	3
Zenit Saint Petersburg	2024–25	Russian Premier League	11	1	—		7	3	—		1 (Note: Appearance in Russian Super Cup)	0	19	4
Zenit Saint Petersburg	Total		22	4	—		13	3	—		1	0	36	7
Career total			223	43	61	11	33	6	30	12	11	1	358	73

== Honours ==
Palmeiras

- Campeonato Brasileiro Série A: 2016, 2018, 2023

Londrina

- Primeira Liga: 2017

Bahia

- Campeonato Baiano: 2019

Zenit Saint Petersburg

- Russian Premier League: 2023–24
- Russian Cup: 2023–24
- Russian Super Cup: 2024

Individual

- Best Forward in Brazil: 2021
