= Sheslon =

Brazilian footballer

Personal information
- Full name: Sheslon Lucas Lima Sant'Ana
- Date of birth: January 4, 1987 (age 39)
- Place of birth: Barão de Cocais, Brazil
- Height: 1.84 m (6 ft 0 in)
- Position: Right back

Team information
- Current team: Boa

Youth career
- 2006: Atlético Mineiro

Senior career*
Years	Team	Apps	(Gls)
2007–2012	Atlético Mineiro		
2007	→ Democrata GV-MG (Loan)		
2010–2011	→ América Mineiro (Loan)	9	(0)
2012	→ Boavista-RJ (Loan)		
2013–	Boa		
- * Club domestic league appearances and goals

Sheslon Lucas Lima Sant'Ana or simply Sheslon (born January 4, 1987, in Barão de Cocais), is a Brazilian right back. Aposentado.

== Contract ==
- 10 February 2005 to 6 February 2010
