= Didi (footballer, born 1991) =

Brazilian footballer

Personal information
- Full name: Vinicius José Ignácio
- Date of birth: 25 May 1991 (age 35)
- Place of birth: Sao Vicente, Brazil
- Height: 1.84 m (6 ft 0 in)
- Position: Centre-back

Youth career
- 2008–2010: Paulista

Senior career*
| Years | Team | Apps | (Gls) |
| 2010 | Paulista | 0 | (0) |
| 2011–2012 | Palmeiras B | 22 | (2) |
| 2013 | São Bernardo | 1 | (0) |
| 2013 | CRAC | 13 | (0) |
| 2014–2015 | Audax | 24 | (1) |
| 2014 | → Guaratinguetá (loan) | 10 | (0) |
| 2016–2018 | Adanaspor | 76 | (1) |
| 2019–2020 | Botafogo-SP | 28 | (3) |
| 2020 | Guarani | 26 | (1) |
| 2021 | Ferroviária | 5 | (0) |
| 2021 | Juventude | 13 | (0) |
| 2022 | Ferroviária | 12 | (0) |
| 2022 | Bahia | 9 | (0) |
| 2023 | Água Santa | 15 | (1) |
| 2023 | Avaí | 6 | (0) |
- * Club domestic league appearances and goals

Vinicius José Ignácio (born 25 May 1991), commonly known as Didi, is a Brazilian former footballer who plays as a centre-back.

== Career ==
=== Palmeiras B ===
Didi made his league debut against União São João on 7 March 2012.

=== São Bernardo ===
Didi made his league debut against Mirassol on 16 March 2013.

=== CRAC ===
Didi made his league debut against Vila Nova on 14 July 2013.

=== Osasco Audax ===
Didi made his league debut against Paulista on 18 January 2014. He scored his first goal for the club against RB Bragantino on 19 February 2014, scoring in the 53rd minute.

=== Guaratinguetá ===
Didi made his league debut against Duque de Caxias on 18 May 2014.

=== Adanaspor ===
Didi made his league debut against Şanlıurfaspor on 16 August 2015. He scored his first goal for the club against Gaziantep on 12 February 2018, scoring in the 74th minute.

=== Botafogo-SP ===
Didi made his league debut against Atlético Goianiense on 24 July 2019. He scored his first goal for the club against São Bento on 13 September 2019.

=== Guarani ===
Didi scored on his league debut against Cruzeiro on 12 August 2020, scoring in the 73rd minute.

=== First spell at Ferroviária ===
Didi made his league debut against RB Bragantino on 26 April 2021.

=== Juventude ===
Didi made his league debut against Sport Recife on 21 June 2021.

=== Second spell at Ferroviária ===
Didi made his league debut against Corinthians on 26 January 2022.

=== Bahia ===
Didi made his league debut against Náutico on 16 April 2022.

=== Água Santa ===
Didi scored on his league debut against Ferroviária on 15 January 2023, scoring in the 68th minute.

=== Avaí ===
Didi made his league debut against Mirassol on 22 April 2023.

== Honours ==
=== Individual ===
- Campeonato Paulista Team of the year: 2023
