= Zé Rafael =

Brazilian footballer (born 1993)

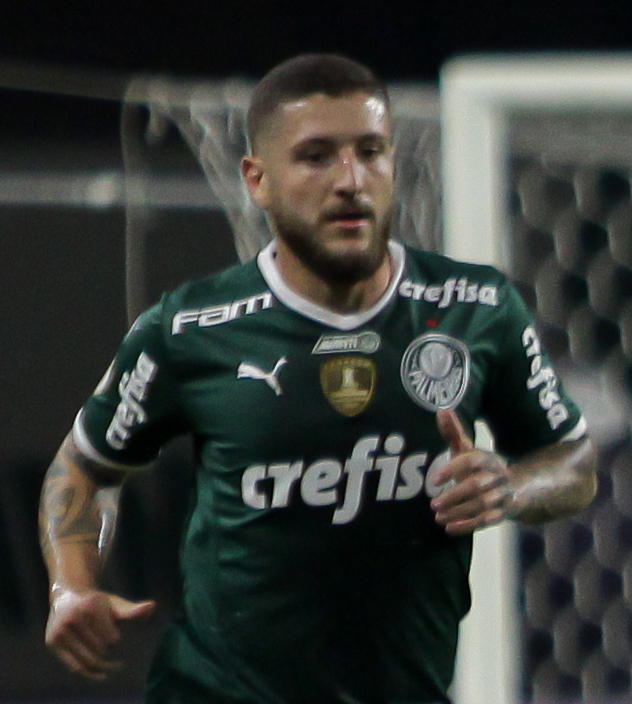
- Zé Rafael with Palmeiras in 2022

Personal information
- Full name: José Rafael Vivian
- Date of birth: 16 June 1993 (age 33)
- Place of birth: Ponta Grossa, Brazil
- Height: 1.75 m (5 ft 9 in)
- Position: Defensive midfielder

Team information
- Current team: Alverca
- Number: 93

Youth career
- 2009–2012: Coritiba

Senior career*
Years	Team	Apps	(Gls)
2012–2016	Coritiba	22	(0)
2014	→ Novo Hamburgo (loan)	6	(3)
2015	→ Londrina (loan)	16	(2)
2016	→ Londrina (loan)	42	(8)
2017–2018	Bahia	91	(11)
2019–2025	Palmeiras	227	(17)
2025–2026	Santos	37	(2)
2026–	Alverca	0	(0)
- * Club domestic league appearances and goals as of 5 September 2026

José Rafael Vivian (born 16 June 1993), known as Zé Rafael, is a Brazilian professional footballer who plays as a defensive midfielder for Primeira Liga club Alverca.

== Club career ==
=== Coritiba ===
Born in Ponta Grossa, Paraná, Zé Rafael joined Coritiba's youth setup in 2009, aged 16, as an attacking midfielder. He made his first team debut on 29 April 2012, coming on as a half-time substitute for Rafael Silva in a 3–1 Campeonato Paranaense away win against Roma.

Zé Rafael was definitely promoted to the first team ahead of the 2013 season, and made his Série A debut on 11 August of that year by replacing Lincoln in a 1–0 loss at Vasco da Gama. On 12 February 2014, after appearing sparingly, he was loaned to Novo Hamburgo until the end of the 2014 Campeonato Gaúcho.

Zé Rafael scored his first senior goal on 27 February 2014, netting the first in a 2–1 home win against Passo Fundo. Upon returning, he only featured rarely before joining Londrina on loan on 5 May 2015, with Paulinho moving in the opposite direction.

Zé Rafael became a regular starter at the Tubarão, helping in their promotion to Série B with two goals. He subsequently returned to Coxa, but after failing to make an appearance, he requested to leave and returned to Londrina on 11 February 2016, on loan until December.

Zé Rafael was an undisputed starter during the second division, scoring four goals in 32 appearances as his side finished sixth, three points away from another promotion; highlights included a brace in a 2–1 away win against Vila Nova.

=== Bahia ===
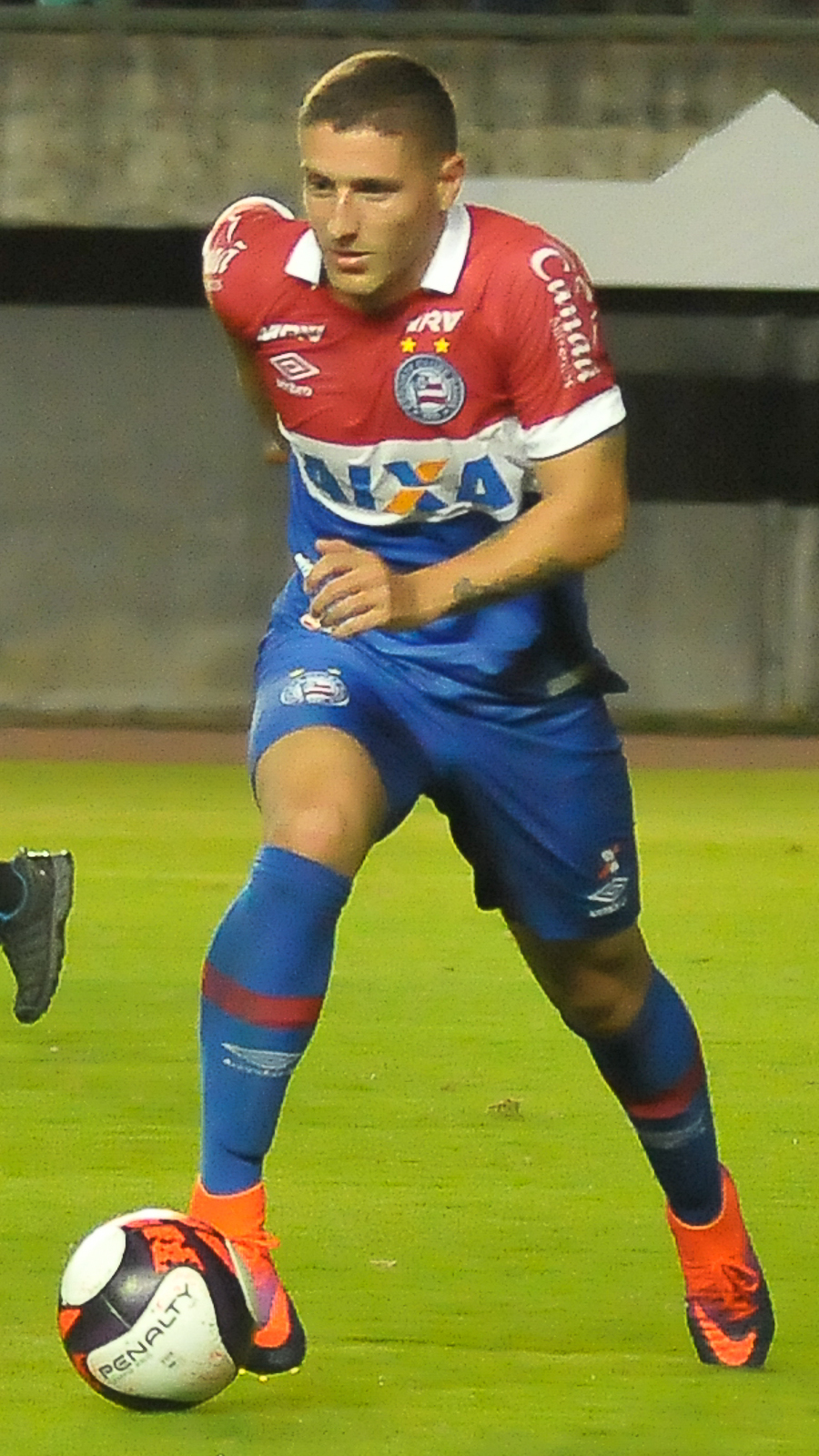
Zé Rafael with Bahia in 2017

On 6 January 2017, Zé Rafael signed a three-year deal with Bahia, in the first division. He immediately became a starter for the new side, winning the 2017 Copa do Nordeste.

Zé Rafael scored his first top tier goal on 14 May 2017, netting the equalizer in a 6–2 home routing of Atlético Paranaense. He only missed two league matches in his first season, both due to suspension, and also won the 2018 Campeonato Baiano.

=== Palmeiras ===
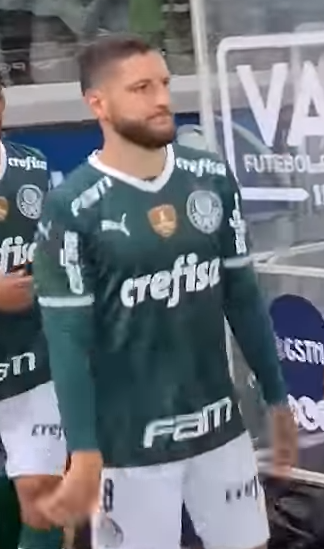
Zé Rafael with Palmeiras in 2022

Zé Rafael signed a five-year deal with Palmeiras on 29 November 2018; the signing cost R$ 14.5 million for Palmeiras and became the biggest sale in Bahia's history. After the arrival of Vanderlei Luxemburgo as coach, he was moved back to a defensive midfielder position.

Established as a regular starter, Zé Rafael won two Copa Libertadores titles with Verdão, being a first-choice in both campaigns. He renewed his contract until 2025 on 6 January 2023, and further extended his link for another year exactly one year later.

After the arrival of new signing Aníbal Moreno and the proeminence of Richard Ríos, Zé Rafael played most of the 2024 Campeonato Paulista as a left midfielder. He reached 300 matches for the club in July of that year, but struggled with injuries throughout the season, subsequently losing his starting spot.

=== Santos ===
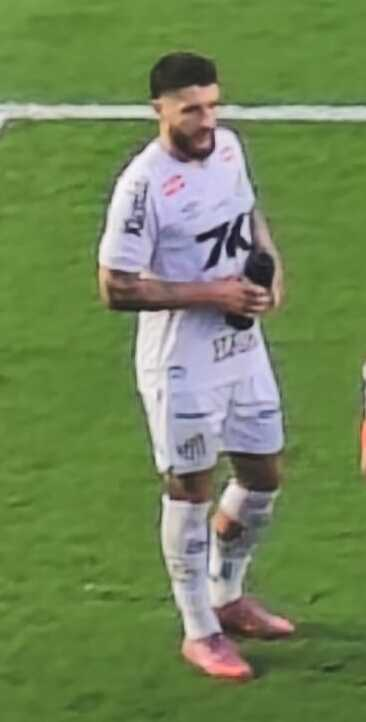
Zé Rafael playing for Santos in 2025

On 26 February 2025, Santos announced the signing of Zé Rafael on a three-year contract. After nursing a back injury, he made his debut for the club on 12 May, replacing Tomás Rincón late into a 0–0 draw against Ceará at the Allianz Parque, stadium of his former side Palmeiras.

Zé Rafael scored his first goal for Peixe on 16 October 2025, netting the opener in a 3–1 home win over rivals Corinthians. In the following season, however, he lost space due to injuries and was subsequently separated from the squad in July 2026. On 3 August of that year, he officially terminated his link with the club.

=== Alverca ===
On 24 August 2026, Zé Rafael moved to Europe for the first time and signed with Alverca in Portugal.

== Career statistics ==
As of 4 May 2026

Club	Season	League			State League		Cup		Continental		Other		Total	
Club	Season	Division	Apps	Goals	Apps	Goals	Apps	Goals	Apps	Goals	Apps	Goals	Apps	Goals
Coritiba	2012	Série A	0	0	1	0	0	0	—		—		1	0
Coritiba	2013	Série A	7	0	5	0	2	0	2 (Note: Appearance(s) in Copa Sudamericana)	0	—		16	0
Coritiba	2014	Série A	3	0	5	0	—		—		—		8	0
Coritiba	2015	Série A	0	0	1	0	0	0	—		—		1	0
Coritiba	2016	Série A	0	0	0	0	0	0	—		0	0	0	0
Coritiba	Subtotal		10	0	12	0	2	0	2	0	0	0	26	0
Novo Hamburgo (loan)	2014	Gaúcho	—		6	3	4	0	—		—		10	3
Londrina (loan)	2015	Série C	16	2	—		—		—		—		16	2
Londrina (loan)	2016	Série B	32	4	10	4	1	0	—		—		43	8
Londrina (loan)	Subtotal		48	6	10	4	2	0	—		—		59	10
Bahia	2017	Série A	36	3	10	1	2	0	—		12 (Note: Appearance(s) in Copa do Nordeste)	1	60	5
Bahia	2018	Série A	33	4	12	3	4	1	8	3	11	2	68	13
Bahia	Subtotal		69	7	22	4	6	1	8	3	23	3	128	18
Palmeiras	2019	Série A	27	5	4	0	3	2	4 (Note: Appearance(s) in Copa Libertadores)	0	—		38	7
Palmeiras	2020	Série A	26	2	16	1	7	0	12	2	1 (Note: Appearance(s) in FIFA Club World Cup)	0	62	5
Palmeiras	2021	Série A	26	1	8	0	2	0	10	2	4 (Note: One appearance in Supercopa do Brasil, one appearance in Recopa Sudamericana, two appearances in FIFA Club World Cup)	0	50	3
Palmeiras	2022	Série A	33	3	11	2	4	0	11	1	2 (Note: Appearance(s) in Recopa Sudamericana)	1	61	7
Palmeiras	2023	Série A	31	3	14	0	4	0	10	0	1 (Note: Appearance(s) in Supercopa do Brasil)	0	60	3
Palmeiras	2024	Série A	18	0	13	0	2	0	3	0	1	0	37	0
Palmeiras	Subtotal		161	14	66	3	22	2	50	5	9	1	308	25
Santos	2025	Série A	27	1	—		1	0	—		—		28	1
Santos	2026	Série A	5	1	5	0	1	0	1	0	—		12	1
Santos	Subtotal		32	2	5	0	2	0	1	0	—		40	2
Career total			320	29	121	14	38	3	61	8	30	4	570	58

== Honours ==
=== Club ===
Coritiba

- Campeonato Paranaense: 2012, 2013

Bahia

- Copa do Nordeste: 2017
- Campeonato Baiano: 2018

Palmeiras

- Campeonato Paulista: 2020, 2022, 2023, 2024
- Copa do Brasil: 2020
- Copa Libertadores: 2020, 2021
- Recopa Sudamericana: 2022
- Campeonato Brasileiro Série A: 2022, 2023
- Supercopa do Brasil: 2023
- FIFA Club World Cup Runner Up: 2021

=== Individual ===
- Bola de Prata: 2022
- Best Central Midfielder in Brazil: 2022
- Campeonato Paulista Team of the Year: 2023
