= 2022 Recopa Sudamericana =

CONMEBOL Recopa Sudamericana 2022
Athletico Paranaense	Palmeiras
(Brazil)	(Brazil)
2	4
- on aggregate

First leg
Athletico Paranaense	Palmeiras
2	2
- Date: 23 February 2022
- Venue: Arena da Baixada, Curitiba
- Referee: Facundo Tello (Argentina)
- Attendance: 25,072

Second leg
Palmeiras	Athletico Paranaense
2	0
- Date: 2 March 2022
- Venue: Allianz Parque, São Paulo
- Referee: Jesús Valenzuela (Venezuela)
- Attendance: 30,065

The 2022 CONMEBOL Recopa Sudamericana (Portuguese: CONMEBOL Recopa Sul-Americana de 2022) was the 30th edition of the CONMEBOL Recopa Sudamericana (also referred to as the Recopa Sudamericana), the football competition organized by CONMEBOL between the winners of the previous season's two major South American club tournaments, the Copa Libertadores and the Copa Sudamericana.

The competition was contested in two-legged home-and-away format between Brazilian teams Palmeiras, the 2021 Copa Libertadores champions, and Athletico Paranaense, the 2021 Copa Sudamericana champions. The first leg was hosted by Athletico Paranaense on 23 February 2022 at Arena da Baixada in Curitiba, while the second leg was hosted by Palmeiras on 2 March 2022 at Allianz Parque in São Paulo.

Palmeiras defeated Athletico Paranaense 4–2 on aggregate to win their first Recopa Sudamericana title.

== Teams ==
Team	Qualification	Previous appearances (bold indicates winners)
(Brazil) Palmeiras	2021 Copa Libertadores champions	1 (2021)
(Brazil) Athletico Paranaense	2021 Copa Sudamericana champions	1 (2019)

== Format ==
The Recopa Sudamericana is played on a home-and-away two-legged basis, with the Copa Libertadores champions hosting the second leg. If tied on aggregate, the away goals rule would not be used, and 30 minutes of extra time would be played. If still tied after extra time, the penalty shoot-out would be used to determine the winners (Regulations Article 17).

== Matches ==
Kawan, Matheus Babi, Matheus Felipe, Pedro Rocha and Reinaldo (Athletico Paranaense) and Gabriel Menino and Luan (Palmeiras) were ruled out of the matches due to injuries. Vitor Bueno (Athletico Paranaense) was not available due to suspension.

Pablo (Athletico Paranaense) and Gustavo Scarpa (Palmeiras) were ruled out of the first leg due to injuries. Julimar (Athletico Paranaense) and Gustavo Gómez (Palmeiras) did not play the first leg after testing COVID-19 positive. Marcinho (Athletico Paranaense), who conceded the penalty in stoppage time during the first leg, was excluded of the team by the president Mario Celso Petraglia and was ruled out of the second leg.

=== First leg ===
23 February 2022
21:30 UTC−3

Athletico Paranaense (Brazil)	2–2	(Brazil) Palmeiras
Terans 19'; Marlos 76'	Report	Jailson 28'; Raphael Veiga 90+7' (pen.)

Arena da Baixada, Curitiba
Attendance: 25,072
Referee: Facundo Tello (Argentina)

**Athletico Paranaense**	**Palmeiras**

GK	1	(Brazil) Santos
RB	5	(Brazil) Marcinho
CB	34	(Brazil) Pedro Henrique
CB	44	(Brazil) Thiago Heleno (c)	(yellow card) 70'
LB	16	(Brazil) Abner Vinícius		(substituted off) 89'
RM	6	(Brazil) Matheus Fernandes
CM	17	(Brazil) Hugo Moura		(substituted off) 71'
CM	26	(Brazil) Erick	(yellow card) 73'	(substituted off) 89'
LM	35	(Brazil) Rômulo
CF	18	(Brazil) Léo Cittadini
CF	20	(Uruguay) David Terans		(substituted off) 67'
Substitutes:
GK	24	(Brazil) Bento
DF	13	(Brazil) Khellven
DF	22	(Colombia) Nicolás Hernández	(yellow card) 90+6'	(substituted on) 89'
DF	27	(Brazil) Zé Ivaldo		(substituted on) 89'
DF	48	(Brazil) Pedrinho
MF	10	(Ukraine) Marlos		(substituted on) 67'
MF	39	(Brazil) Christian		(substituted on) 71'
FW	11	(Brazil) Carlos Eduardo
FW	21	(Brazil) Davi Araújo
FW	37	(Brazil) Bissoli
FW	41	(Brazil) Jajá
FW	50	(Ecuador) John Mercado
Manager:
(Brazil) Alberto Valentim

GK	21	(Brazil) Weverton
RB	2	(Brazil) Marcos Rocha (c)
CB	4	(Chile) Benjamín Kuscevic
CB	26	(Brazil) Murilo
LB	22	(Uruguay) Joaquín Piquerez
CM	20	(Colombia) Eduard Atuesta	(substituted off) 57'
CM	30	(Brazil) Jaílson	(substituted off) 71'
CM	28	(Brazil) Danilo
RF	7	(Brazil) Dudu	(substituted off) 71'
CF	23	(Brazil) Raphael Veiga
LF	10	(Brazil) Rony	(substituted off) 83'
Substitutes:
GK	42	(Brazil) Marcelo Lomba
DF	3	(Brazil) Renan
DF	6	(Brazil) Jorge
DF	12	(Brazil) Mayke
MF	5	(Brazil) Patrick de Paula
MF	8	(Brazil) Zé Rafael	(substituted on) 71'
FW	11	(Brazil) Wesley	(substituted on) 57'
FW	16	(Brazil) Deyverson
FW	17	(Brazil) Giovani
FW	19	(Brazil) Breno Lopes
FW	27	(Brazil) Gabriel Veron	(substituted on) 71'
FW	29	(Brazil) Rafael Navarro	(substituted on) 83'
Manager:
(Portugal) Abel Ferreira

Assistant referees:
Ezequiel Brailovsky (Argentina)
Maximiliano Del Yesso (Argentina)
Fourth official:
Laura Fortunato (Argentina)
Fifth official:
Mariana de Almeida (Argentina)
Video assistant referee:
Patricio Loustau (Argentina)
Assistant video assistant referees:
Juan Pablo Belatti (Argentina)
Juan Lara (Chile)

Match rules:

- 90 minutes.
- Twelve named substitutes, of which up to five may be used.

=== Second leg ===
2 March 2022
21:30 UTC−3

Palmeiras (Brazil)	2–0	(Brazil) Athletico Paranaense
Zé Rafael 50'; Danilo 88'	Report

Allianz Parque, São Paulo
Attendance: 30,065
Referee: Jesús Valenzuela (Venezuela)

**Palmeiras**	**Athletico Paranaense**

GK	21	(Brazil) Weverton
RB	2	(Brazil) Marcos Rocha
CB	15	(Paraguay) Gustavo Gómez (c)
CB	26	(Brazil) Murilo
LB	22	(Uruguay) Joaquín Piquerez
CM	23	(Brazil) Raphael Veiga		(substituted off) 87'
CM	28	(Brazil) Danilo
CM	8	(Brazil) Zé Rafael		(substituted off) 70'
RF	7	(Brazil) Dudu		(substituted off) 87'
CF	10	(Brazil) Rony
LF	27	(Brazil) Gabriel Veron		(substituted off) 46'
Substitutes:
GK	42	(Brazil) Marcelo Lomba
DF	4	(Chile) Benjamín Kuscevic
DF	6	(Brazil) Jorge
DF	12	(Brazil) Mayke		(substituted on) 87'
MF	5	(Brazil) Patrick de Paula
MF	14	(Brazil) Gustavo Scarpa
MF	20	(Colombia) Eduard Atuesta		(substituted on) 87'
MF	30	(Brazil) Jaílson		(substituted on) 70'
FW	11	(Brazil) Wesley		(substituted on) 46'
FW	16	(Brazil) Deyverson
FW	19	(Brazil) Breno Lopes
FW	29	(Brazil) Rafael Navarro
Manager:
(Portugal) Abel Ferreira			(yellow card) 63' (red card) 90+1'

GK	1	(Brazil) Santos
RB	13	(Brazil) Khellven	(substituted off) 85'
CB	34	(Brazil) Pedro Henrique
CB	44	(Brazil) Thiago Heleno (c)
LB	16	(Brazil) Abner Vinícius
CM	6	(Brazil) Matheus Fernandes	(substituted off) 74'
CM	17	(Brazil) Hugo Moura	(substituted off) 86'
CM	26	(Brazil) Erick
RF	18	(Brazil) Léo Cittadini	(substituted off) 62'
CF	7	(Brazil) Pablo
LF	20	(Uruguay) David Terans	(substituted off) 62'
Substitutes:
GK	24	(Brazil) Bento
DF	22	(Colombia) Nicolás Hernández
DF	27	(Brazil) Zé Ivaldo
DF	48	(Brazil) Pedrinho
MF	10	(Ukraine) Marlos	(substituted on) 62'
MF	30	(Ecuador) Bryan García
MF	39	(Brazil) Christian	(substituted on) 85'
FW	11	(Brazil) Carlos Eduardo
FW	21	(Brazil) Davi Araújo
FW	29	(Brazil) Julimar	(substituted on) 74'
FW	35	(Brazil) Rômulo	(substituted on) 86'
FW	50	(Ecuador) John Mercado	(substituted on) 62'
Manager:
(Brazil) Alberto Valentim

Assistant referees:
Jorge Urrego (Venezuela)
Tulio Moreno (Venezuela)
Fourth official:
Alexis Herrera (Venezuela)
Fifth official:
Lubin Torrealba (Venezuela)
Video assistant referee:
Germán Delfino (Argentina)
Assistant video assistant referees:
Nicolás Tarán (Uruguay)
Julio Bascuñán (Chile)

Match rules:

- 90 minutes.
- 30 minutes of extra time if tied on aggregate (away goals rule not applied).
- Penalty shoot-out if still tied on aggregate after extra time.
- Twelve named substitutes.
- Maximum of five substitutions, with a sixth allowed in extra time.
