= 2023 Supercopa do Brasil =

6th Supercopa do Brasil, annual football match

Palmeiras	Flamengo
(São Paulo (state))	(Rio de Janeiro (state))
4	3
- Date: 28 January 2023
- Venue: Arena BRB Mané Garrincha, Brasília
- Man of the Match: Raphael Veiga (Palmeiras)
- Referee: Wilton Sampaio (Goiás)
- Attendance: 67,422

The 2023 Supercopa do Brasil (officially the Supercopa Betano do Brasil 2023 for sponsorship reasons) was the sixth edition of Supercopa do Brasil, an annual football match played between the champions of the Campeonato Brasileiro Série A and Copa do Brasil.

The match was played on 28 January 2023 between Palmeiras and Flamengo, who qualified after winning the 2022 Campeonato Brasileiro Série A and the 2022 Copa do Brasil, respectively. On 11 January 2023, the CBF announced that the match would be hosted at Arena BRB Mané Garrincha in Brasília.

Palmeiras won the match 4–3 to claim their first ever title in the tournament.

== Qualified teams ==
Team	Qualification	Previous appearances (bold indicates winners)
(São Paulo (state)) Palmeiras	2022 Campeonato Brasileiro Série A champions	1 (2021)
(Rio de Janeiro (state)) Flamengo	2022 Copa do Brasil champions	4 (1991, **2020**, **2021**, 2022)

== Match ==
=== Details ===
28 January 2023
16:30 UTC–3

Palmeiras (São Paulo (state))	4–3	(Rio de Janeiro (state)) Flamengo
Raphael Veiga 37', 58' (pen.); Gabriel Menino 45+4', 73'	Report	Gabriel Barbosa 25' (pen.), 51'; Pedro 60'

Arena BRB Mané Garrincha, Brasília
Attendance: 67,422
Referee: Wilton Sampaio (Goiás)

**Palmeiras**	**Flamengo**

GK	21	(Brazil) Weverton
DF	2	(Brazil) Marcos Rocha
DF	15	(Paraguay) Gustavo Gómez (c)
DF	26	(Brazil) Murilo
DF	22	(Uruguay) Joaquín Piquerez
MF	25	(Brazil) Gabriel Menino	(yellow card) 45+6'	(substituted off) 78'
MF	8	(Brazil) Zé Rafael		(substituted off) 87'
MF	23	(Brazil) Raphael Veiga
FW	7	(Brazil) Dudu		(substituted off) 87'
FW	10	(Brazil) Rony		(substituted off) 87'
FW	16	(Brazil) Endrick		(substituted off) 63'
Substitutes:
GK	42	(Brazil) Marcelo Lomba
DF	4	(Chile) Benjamín Kuscevic
DF	6	(Brazil) Vanderlan
DF	12	(Brazil) Mayke		(substituted in) 63'
DF	13	(Brazil) Luan		(substituted in) 87'
MF	11	(Brazil) Bruno Tabata
MF	20	(Colombia) Eduard Atuesta
MF	30	(Brazil) Jailson		(substituted in) 78'
FW	17	(Brazil) Giovani
FW	18	(Argentina) José Manuel López
FW	19	(Brazil) Breno Lopes		(substituted in) 87'
FW	29	(Brazil) Rafael Navarro		(substituted in) 87'
Manager:
(Portugal) Abel Ferreira				(yellow card) 44' (red card) 90+5'

GK	1	(Brazil) Santos
DF	2	(Uruguay) Guillermo Varela		(substituted off) 76'
DF	23	(Brazil) David Luiz	(yellow card) 37'
DF	4	(Brazil) Léo Pereira
DF	6	(Brazil) Ayrton Lucas		(substituted off) 88'
MF	8	(Brazil) Thiago Maia
MF	20	(Brazil) Gerson		(substituted off) 79'
MF	7	(Brazil) Éverton Ribeiro (c)	(yellow card) 90+6'
MF	14	(Uruguay) Giorgian de Arrascaeta		(substituted off) 76'
FW	10	(Brazil) Gabriel Barbosa	(yellow card) 26'
FW	9	(Brazil) Pedro	(yellow card) 90+8'
Substitutes:
GK	25	(Brazil) Matheus Cunha
DF	3	(Brazil) Rodrigo Caio
DF	15	(Brazil) Fabrício Bruno
DF	16	(Brazil) Filipe Luís
DF	30	(Brazil) Pablo
DF	34	(Brazil) Matheuzinho		(substituted in) 76'
MF	5	(Chile) Erick Pulgar
MF	32	(Chile) Arturo Vidal		(substituted in) 79'
MF	42	(Brazil) Matheus França		(substituted in) 88'
FW	11	(Brazil) Everton		(substituted in) 76'
FW	31	(Brazil) Marinho	(yellow card) 90+6'
FW	46	(Brazil) Mateusão
Manager:
(Portugal) Vítor Pereira

Man of the Match:
(Brazil) Raphael Veiga (Palmeiras)
Assistant referees:
Bruno Boschilia (Paraná)
Bruno Raphael Pires (Goiás)
Fourth official:
Sávio Sampaio (Distrito Federal)
Fifth official:
Leila Naiara Moreira da Cruz (Distrito Federal)
Video assistant referee:
Rodrigo D'Alonso Ferreira (Santa Catarina)
Assistant video assistant referees:
Helton Nunes (Santa Catarina)
Rafael Traci (Santa Catarina)

**Match rules**

- 90 minutes.
- Penalty shoot-out if scores still level.
- Twelve named substitutes.
- Maximum of five substitutions.
