= Breno Lopes (footballer, born 1996) =

Brazilian footballer

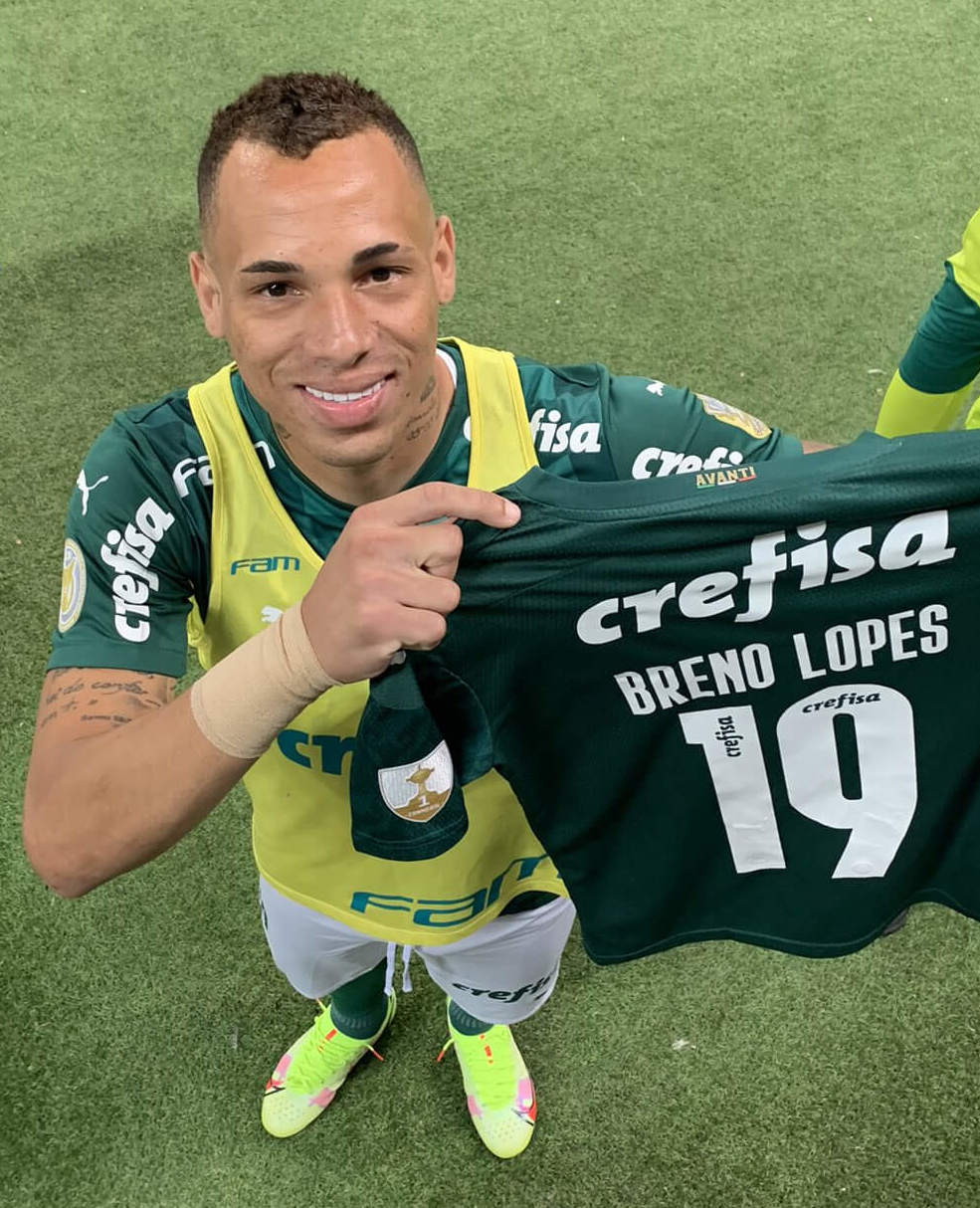

Personal information
- Full name: Breno Henrique Vasconcelos Lopes
- Date of birth: 24 January 1996 (age 30)
- Place of birth: Belo Horizonte, Brazil
- Height: 1.78 m (5 ft 10 in)
- Position: Forward

Team information
- Current team: Coritiba
- Number: 77

Youth career
- 2007–2013: Cruzeiro
- 2014: São José-RS
- 2015: Cerâmica
- 2015–2016: Joinville

Senior career*
Years	Team	Apps	(Gls)
2016–2018	Joinville	52	(5)
2016	→ Juventus Jaraguá (loan)	7	(1)
2019–2020	Juventude	50	(16)
2019	→ Figueirense (loan)	12	(2)
2020	→ Athletico Paranaense (loan)	5	(1)
2020–2024	Palmeiras	128	(20)
2024–2025	Fortaleza	70	(12)
2026–	Coritiba	13	(3)
- * Club domestic league appearances and goals as of 7 April 2026

Breno Henrique Vasconcelos Lopes (born 24 January 1996), known as Breno Lopes or simply Breno, is a Brazilian footballer who plays as a forward for Coritiba.

== Club career ==
=== Early career ===
Born in Belo Horizonte, Minas Gerais, Breno Lopes joined Cruzeiro's youth setup at the age of 11, but was released four years later. He subsequently represented São José-RS, Cerâmica and Joinville, where he finished his formation.

=== Joinville ===
Breno Lopes made his first team debut for Joinville on 6 March 2016, coming on as a second-half substitute for Welinton Júnior in a 2–1 Campeonato Catarinense home win against Guarani de Palhoça. In June, after featuring rarely, he joined Juventus de Jaraguá on loan for the Catarinense Série B, and scored his first senior goal on his debut for the club on 24 July, a 1–1 away draw against Porto-SC.

Upon returning in January 2017, Breno Lopes started to feature regularly for JEC. In December 2018, after the club was relegated to the Série D, he took a legal action against the club due to unpaid wages, and subsequently terminated his contract.

=== Juventude ===
On 22 January 2019, Breno Lopes was presented at Série C side Juventude; Joinville also retained 50% of his economic rights. On 4 October, after helping the club achieve promotion to the Série B, he was loaned to Figueirense until the end of the campaign; subsequently, a loan to Athletico Paranaense for the 2020 Campeonato Paranaense was also agreed.

On 29 April 2020, Breno Lopes left Furacão as his loan contract expired, and returned to Juventude, where he impressed during the year's second division.

=== Palmeiras ===
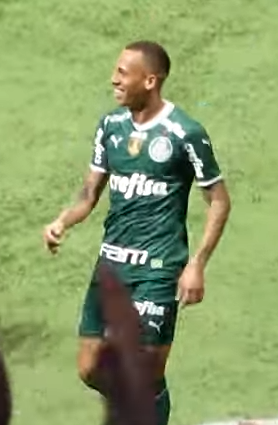
Breno Lopes with Palmeiras in 2022

On 10 November 2020, Juventude announced the transfer of Breno Lopes to Palmeiras in the top tier. He made his debut in the main category five days later, replacing Willian in a 2–0 home success over Fluminense. On 30 January 2021, he scored the winning goal for Palmeiras in a 1–0 win over Santos in the 2020 Copa Libertadores Final, nine minutes into stoppage time.

== Career statistics ==
As of 6 December 2021.

Club	Season	League			State League		Cup		Continental		Other		Total	
Club	Season	Division	Apps	Goals	Apps	Goals	Apps	Goals	Apps	Goals	Apps	Goals	Apps	Goals
Joinville	2016	Série B	0	0	4	0	0	0	—		—		4	0
Joinville	2017	Série C	9	1	13	1	5	1	—		1 (Note: Appearance(s) in Primeira Liga)	0	28	3
Joinville	2018	Série C	16	2	10	1	1	0	—		—		27	3
Joinville	Total		25	3	27	2	6	1	—		1	0	59	6
Juventus Jaraguá (loan)	2016	Catarinense Série B	—		7	1	—		—		—		7	1
Juventude	2019	Série C	17	4	11	1	8	1	—		—		36	6
Juventude	2020	Série B	19	9	3	2	4	0	—		—		26	11
Juventude	Total		36	13	14	3	12	1	—		—		62	17
Figueirense (loan)	2019	Série B	12	2	—		—		—		—		12	2
Athletico Paranaense (loan)	2020	Série A	0	0	5	1	0	0	—		0	0	5	1
Palmeiras	2020	Série A	18	2	—		—		5 (Note: Appearance(s) in Copa Libertadores)	1	—		23	3
Palmeiras	2021	Série A	22	7	3	1	1	0	3	0	3 (Note: One appearance in Supercopa do Brasil, two appearances in Recopa Sudamericana)	0	32	8
Palmeiras	Total		40	9	3	1	1	0	8	1	3	0	55	11
Career total			113	27	56	8	19	2	8	1	4	0	200	38

== Honours ==
Athletico Paranaense

- Campeonato Paranaense: 2020

Palmeiras

- Copa Libertadores: 2020, 2021
- Recopa Sudamericana: 2022
- Campeonato Paulista: 2022, 2023, 2024
- Campeonato Brasileiro: 2022, 2023
- Supercopa do Brasil: 2023
- FIFA Club World Cup Runner Up: 2021
