= 2022 Club Universitario de Deportes season =

Universitario de Deportes
2022 season
- Chairman: Jean Ferrari
- Manager: Álvaro Guiterrez; Carlos Compagnucci
- Stadium: Estadio Monumental "U"
- Liga 1: 5th
- Copa Libertadores: Second stage
Home colours	Away colours	Third colours

The 2022 season was Universitario de Deportes' 98th season in the Peruvian Primera División and 33rd in the Copa Libertadores. The club started with Álvaro Gutiérrez as coach, after bad results, the Uruguayan was dismissed and Carlos Compagnucci would arrive in his replacement.

== Players ==
Note: Flags indicate national team as defined under FIFA eligibility rules; some limited exceptions apply. Players may hold more than one non-FIFA nationality.

No.	Pos.	Nation	Player
1	GK	PER	José Carvallo (Captain)
2	MF	PER	Alfonso Barco
3	DF	PER	Leonardo Rugel
4	DF	URU	Federico Alonso
7	FW	PER	Alexander Succar
8	DF	PER	Nelinho Quina
10	MF	PER	Hernán Novick
11	FW	URU	Luis Urruti
12	GK	PER	Aamet Calderón
14	DF	PER	Brayan Velarde
15	MF	PER	José Zevallos
16	DF	PER	Iván Santillán

No.	Pos.	Nation	Player
18	FW	PER	Tiago Cantoro
19	FW	PAN	Alberto Quintero
21	GK	PER	Diego Romero
23	MF	PER	Jorge Murrugarra
25	MF	PER	Gerson Barreto
26	MF	PER	Jorge Tandazo
25	DF	PER	Nelson Cabanillas
29	DF	PER	Aldo Corzo
30	DF	PER	Piero Guzmán
36	MF	PER	Piero Quispe
44	FW	PER	Rodrigo Vilca
51	MF	ARG	Claudio Yacob
73	MF	PER	Jordan Guivin
99	FW	PER	Andy Polo

== Transfers ==
=== In ===
==== Summer ====
Pos.	Player	From	Fee	Source
DF	Roberto Villamarín	Ayacucho FC	Free	
MF	Alfonso Barco	CD Universidad de San Martín de Porres	Free	
MF	Ángel Cayetano	Cerro Largo	Free	
MF	Rodrigo Vilca	Newcastle United U23	Loan	
FW	Andy Polo	Portland Timbers	Free	
FW	Joao Villamarín	Sport Boys	Free	

==== Winter ====
Pos.	Player	From	Fee	Source
MF	Jordan Guivin	Celaya FC	Loan	
MF	Claudio Yacob	Rosario Central	Free	

=== Out ===
==== Summer ====
Pos.	Player	From	Fee	Source
DF	Werner Schuler	Univ. Técnica de Cajamarca	Free	
FW	Enzo Gutiérrez	Manta F.C.	Free	
FW	Anthony Osorio	Atlético Grau	Free	

==== Winter ====
Pos.	Player	From	Fee	Source
DF	Roberto Villamarín	Carlos A. Mannucci	Free	
MF	Ángel Cayetano	Deportivo Maldonado	Free	
MF	Armando Alfageme	Asoc. Deportiva Tarma	Loan	
MF	Rafael Guarderas	Alianza Atlético Sullana	Loan	
FW	Joao Villamarín	Atlético Grau	Loan	
FW	Alex Valera	Al-Fateh	Undisclosed	

== Friendlies ==
Match won	Match drawn	Match lost

Universitario de Deportes	1:3	Deportivo Municipal
Quintero		Rodriguez; Renato Espinosa

Universitario de Deportes	0:0	Deportivo Municipal

Universitario de Deportes	0:1	Cantolao
		Rodrigo Pastorini

Universitario de Deportes	1:1	Cantolao

Univ. de San Martín	0:4	Universitario de Deportes
		Succar; Zevallos; Autogol

Universitario de Deportes	2:0	Sport Boys
Cayetano; Villamarín

Universitario de Deportes	2:1	Sport Boys
Cayetano; Cantoro

Inter Miami	4:0	Universitario de Deportes
Cabanillas 19'; Ian Fray 43'; Harvey Neville 54'; Ethan Hardin 72'

Universitario de Deportes	2:3	Aucas
Cayetano 4'; Succar 7'		Víctor Figueroa 12' 22'; Nicolás Silva 86'

== Competitions ==
=== Overall ===
Competition	Started round	Final position / round	First match	Last match
Liga 1	Matchday 1	5th	6 Feb	28 Oct
Copa Libertadores	Second stage	Second stage	23 Feb	2 Mar

=== Liga 1 ===
==== Torneo Apertura ====
Pos	Team	Pld	W	D	L	GF	GA	GD	Pts
8	Alianza Atlético	18	9	3	6	26	27	−1	30
9	Universitario	18	8	4	6	24	19	+5	28
10	Deportivo Municipal	18	7	4	7	30	36	−6	25

===== Matches =====
Match won	Match drawn	Match lost

Kick off times are in UTC-5.

Universitario beat Cantolao 3–0 in the first match of Liga1. Cantolao played with nine players from the 59th minute and that, somehow, made things easier for Universitario to open with victory this season.

1	Cantolao	0:3	Universitario de Deportes
		Report	Quina 71'; Valera 73'; Villamarín 76'

At the Monumental stadium, the 'U' won 3–0 against San Martín with two goals from Nelinho Quina. The Uruguayan Álvaro Gutiérrez debuted with victory as the club's coach.

2	Universitario de Deportes	3:0	Univ. de San Martín
	Quina 18' 85'; Valera 71'	Report

After two consecutive victories, Universitario suffered defeat in the heat of Lambayeque, losing 2–1 to Carlos Stein. Universitario started better in the match, where not only was the heat hitting hard, but the tall grass prevented them from developing a better game. Universitario never gave up, but the 0–0 would remain in the first half.

In the second half, Federico Alonso put Universitario ahead, then the Colombian Mena took advantage of a rebound and scored the tie. In the final minutes, both teams were very tired, but Carlos Stein took advantage of a mistake by defender Quina and scored the second goal.

3	Carlos Stein	2:1	Universitario de Deportes
	Mena 67'; Quina 90+2'	Report	Alonso 59'

At home, the Universitario de Deportes team defeated César Vallejo by a score of 3–0. At 15 minutes Ángel Cayetano scored the first goal, Valera took advantage of a rebound left by the goalkeeper and with a shot he made it 2–0 at 37 minutes, at 72 minutes Nelinho Quina from the penalty spot would score 3–0.

4	Universitario de Deportes	3:0	Universidad César Vallejo
	Cayetano 15'; Valera 38'; Quina 73'	Report

After an early elimination from the Copa Libertadores, Universitario faced Municipal. In a new edition of the modern classic, Deportivo Municipal defeated Universitario 2–1.

5	Deportivo Municipal	2:1	Universitario de Deportes
	Bazán 34'; Rodríguez 57'	Report	Quintero 70'

In the sixth match, Universitario drew 1–1 at home against Cienciano. Piero Guzmán scored for Universitario, but Fernando Guerrero equalized in the second half for the cusqueños. This result allowed Universitario to add 10 points and stay in fourth place.

6	Universitario de Deportes	1:1	Cienciano
	Guzmán 5'	Report	Guerrero 47'

Deportivo Binacional defeated Universitario de Deportes 1–0, after an own goal by Quina. Universitario was six points away from first place. With the defeat, the club adds 3 games without winning.

7	Deportivo Binacional	1:0	Universitario de Deportes
	Quina 44'	Report

Stepping on the accelerator in the second half, Universitario beat ADT 2–1 with two goals from Alex Valera. ADT played with 10 players from the 44th minute of the first half, Universitario won, reached 13 points and was in sixth place.

8	Universitario de Deportes	2:1	ADT
	Valera 50' 71'	Report	Rengifo 16'

Universitario achieved a great away victory against Ayacucho FC, winning 2–1. Ayacucho opened the scoring with a goal from Quina, but Universitario prevailed after an error by goalkeeper Espinoza and a goal from Andy Polo in the final minutes.

9	Ayacucho FC	1:2	Universitario de Deportes
	Quina 40'	Report	Espinoza 88'; Polo 90+1'

In a Clásico Alianza Lima beat Universitario 4–1 at the Monumental. Two goals from Jairo Concha, one from Arley Rodríguez and another from Hernán Barcos were the goals for Alianza Lima.

With the partnership of Lavandeira, Benítez and Concha, Alianza Lima became

Alianza Lima won the Clásico by 3 goals with the score ending 4-1 in the 30th minute of the game Jairo Concha received a pass from Lavandeira and scored the second goal. Universitario, with the team in the lead Pablo Míguez, who while trying to intercept a cross from Santillán, ended up scoring his own goal. Alianza Lima, after scored the third goal, it was from Arley Rodríguez, after a pass from Édgar Benítez. But another goal would come, this time from Hernán Barcos, who in the 79th minute of the game closed a win for Alianza at the Monumental.

10	Universitario de Deportes	1:4	Alianza Lima
	Míguez 61'	Report	Concha 26' 30'; Arley Rodríguez 69'; Barcos 80'

11	Universitario de Deportes	1:1	Sport Boys
	Valera 49'	Report	Alarcón 59'

12	Atlético Grau	0:1	Universitario de Deportes
		Report	Valera 90+6'

13	Universitario de Deportes	3:1	Alianza Atlético
	Quina 28'; Valera 41' 83'	Report	Aguirre 23'

14	Carlos Manucci	0:0	Universitario de Deportes
		Report

15	Universitario de Deportes	1:1	Sporting Cristal
	Zevallos 29'	Report	Chávez 35'

16	FBC Melgar	2:0	Universitario de Deportes
	Iberico 39'; Quevedo 90+8'	Report

17	Sport Huancayo	2:0	Universitario de Deportes
	Benites 32'; Perlaza 87'

18	Universitario de Deportes	1:0	UTC
	Valera 56'

==== Torneo Clausura ====
Pos	Team	Pld	W	D	L	GF	GA	GD	Pts
3	Atlético Grau	18	11	4	3	30	19	+11	37
4	Universitario	18	9	6	3	26	10	+16	33
5	Melgar	18	10	3	5	31	18	+13	33

===== Matches =====
Match won	Match drawn	Match lost

Kick off times are in UTC-5.

19	Universitario de Deportes	1:1	Cantolao
	Valera 2'		Pastorini 4'

20	Univ. de San Martín	0:4	Universitario de Deportes
			Valera 45+1'; Alonso 68'; Guivin 71'; Succar 86'

21	Universitario de Deportes	2:0	Carlos Stein
	Novick 73'; Vilca 90+5'

22	Universidad César Vallejo	1:0	Universitario de Deportes
	Vélez 14'

23	Universitario de Deportes	0:1	Deportivo Municipal
			Ovelar 3'

24	Cienciano	1:0	Universitario de Deportes
	Beltrán 45+2'

25	Universitario de Deportes	2:0	Binacional
	Succar 28' 48'

26	ADT	1:1	Universitario de Deportes
	Serna 87'		Guivin 15'

27	Universitario de Deportes	2:1	Ayacucho FC
	Alonso 30'; Succar 75'		Salazar 26'

Alianza Lima	0:2	Universitario de Deportes
		Rugel 54'; Succar 80'

Sport Boys	0:1	Universitario de Deportes
		Cantoro 90+6'

Universitario de Deportes	2:0	Atlético Grau
Quintero 40'; Novick 62'

Alianza Atlético	2:2	Universitario de Deportes
Fernández 12'; Jeremy Canela 47'		Quintero 55'; Corzo 75'

Universitario de Deportes	3:0	Carlos Mannucci
Novick 10'; Guzmán 32'; Quispe 71'

Universitario de Deportes	0:0	Sporting Cristal

Universitario de Deportes	1:1	FBC Melgar
Quintero 17'		Pérez 16'

Universitario de Deportes	2:0	Sport Huancayo
Quispe 22' 41'

UTC	1:1	Universitario de Deportes
Arakaki 58'		Larios 32'

=== Copa Libertadores ===
Second round

At the Monumental Stadium in Guayaquil, Universitario de Deportes lost 2–0 against Barcelona SC. The Ecuadorian club defeated Universitario with goals from Erick Castillo and Carlos Garcés.

23 February 2022	Barcelona (Ecuador)	2–0	(Peru) Universitario	Estadio Monumental Isidro Romero Carbo, Guayaquil
19:30 UTC−5	E. Castillo 60'; Garcés 80'	Report		Attendance: 32,842; Referee: José Argote (Venezuela)

In the second leg, Barcelona beat Universitario 1–0 and, added to the 2–0 win in the first leg, advanced in the tournament. While Universitario said goodbye to international competitions.

2 March 2022	Universitario (Peru)	0–1	(Ecuador) Barcelona	Estadio Nacional, Lima
19:30 UTC−5		Report	Martínez 66'	Attendance: 30,701; Referee: Andrés Matonte (Uruguay)
