= 2021 SE Palmeiras season =

Palmeiras
2021 season
- President: Maurício Galiotte
- Coach: Abel Ferreira
- Stadium: Allianz Parque
- Série A: 3rd
- Campeonato Paulista: Runners-up
- Copa Libertadores: Winners
- Copa do Brasil: Third round
- Recopa Sudamericana: Runners-up
- Supercopa do Brasil: Runners-up
- FIFA Club World Cup: Runners-up
- Top goalscorer: League: Raphael Veiga (10 goals); All: Raphael Veiga (20 goals)
- Highest home attendance: 35,570
- Lowest home attendance: 5,304
- Average home league attendance: 15,877
Home colors	Away colors	Third colors

The 2021 season was the 107th in Sociedade Esportiva Palmeiras' existence. This season Palmeiras participated in the Campeonato Paulista, Copa Libertadores, Copa do Brasil, Série A, Recopa Sudamericana, Supercopa do Brasil and FIFA Club World Cup.

== Squad information ==
As of At the end of the season

Note: Flags indicate national team as defined under FIFA eligibility rules; some limited exceptions apply. Players may hold more than one non-FIFA nationality.

No.	Pos.	Nation	Player
1	GK	BRA	Vinícius
2	DF	BRA	Marcos Rocha
3	DF	BRA	Renan
4	DF	CHI	Benjamín Kuscevic
5	MF	BRA	Patrick de Paula
6	DF	BRA	Jorge
7	FW	BRA	Rony
8	MF	BRA	Zé Rafael
9	FW	BRA	Luan Silva (on loan from Vitória)
10	FW	BRA	Luiz Adriano
11	FW	BRA	Wesley
12	DF	BRA	Mayke
13	DF	BRA	Luan
14	MF	BRA	Gustavo Scarpa

No.	Pos.	Nation	Player
15	DF	PAR	Gustavo Gómez (captain)
16	FW	BRA	Deyverson
18	MF	BRA	Danilo Barbosa
19	FW	BRA	Breno Lopes
21	GK	BRA	Weverton
22	DF	URU	Joaquín Piquerez
23	MF	BRA	Raphael Veiga
25	MF	BRA	Gabriel Menino
26	DF	BRA	Victor Luis
27	FW	BRA	Gabriel Veron
28	MF	BRA	Danilo
38	MF	BRA	Matheus Fernandes
43	FW	BRA	Dudu

=== Transfers ===
==== Transfers in ====
Pos.	Player	Transferred from	Fee/notes	Date	Source
DF	(Brazil) Victor Luis	(Brazil) Botafogo	Loan return.	23 February 2021	
MF	(Brazil) Danilo Barbosa	(France) Nice	Loan.	23 March 2021	
DF	(Brazil) Juninho	(Brazil) Bahia	Loan Return.	13 June 2021	
FW	(Brazil) Deyverson	(Spain) Alavés	Loan return.	16 June 2021	
FW	(Brazil) Dudu	(Qatar) Al-Duhail	Loan return.	2 July 2021	
DF	(Brazil) Pedrão	(Portugal) Nacional	Loan return.	2 July 2021	
MF	(Colombia) Iván Angulo	(Brazil) Cruzeiro	Loan Return.	2 July 2021	
MF	(Brazil) Matheus Fernandes	(Spain) Barcelona	Free transfer.	9 July 2021	
MF	(Brazil) Jorge	(France) Monaco	Sign.	23 July 2021	
FW	(Colombia) Miguel Borja	(Colombia) Junior	Loan return.	27 July 2021	
MF	(Uruguay) Joaquín Piquerez	(Uruguay) Peñarol	Sign.	31 July 2021	
FW	(Colombia) Miguel Borja	(Brazil) Grêmio	Loan Return.	23 December 2021	

==== Transfers out ====
Pos.	Player	Transferred to	Fee/notes	Date	Source
DF	(Brazil) Emerson Santos	(Japan) Kashiwa Reysol	R$9,000,000	23 March 2021	
FW	(Brazil) Rafael Elias	(Brazil) Cuiabá	Loan.	27 May 2021	
DF	(Brazil) Juninho	(Denmark) Midtjylland	R$5,000,000	13 July 2021	
DF	(Brazil) Alan Empereur	(Italy) Verona	Loan return.	17 June 2021	
DF	(Brazil) Pedrão	(Portugal) Portimonense	Loan.	26 July 2021	
MF	(Colombia) Iván Angulo	(Portugal) Portimonense	Loan.	26 July 2021	
DF	(Brazil) Lucas Esteves	(United States) Colorado Rapids	Loan with option to buy.	1 August 2021	
FW	(Colombia) Miguel Borja	(Brazil) Grêmio	Loan.	5 August 2021	
DF	(Uruguay) Matías Viña	(Italy) Roma	€13,000,000	8 August 2021	
FW	(Brazil) Lucas Lima	(Brazil) Fortaleza	Loan.	25 August 2021	
MF	(Brazil) Felipe Melo	(Brazil) Fluminense	Released.	4 December 2021	
GK	(Brazil) Jailson	(Brazil) Cruzeiro	Released.	4 December 2021	
FW	(Brazil) Willian	(Brazil) Fluminense	Sign.	21 December 2021	
FW	(Colombia) Miguel Borja	(Colombia) Junior Barranquilla	Sign.	23 December 2021	

== Competitions ==
=== Overview ===
Competition	First match	Last match	Starting round	Final position	Record							
Competition	First match	Last match	Starting round	Final position	Pld	W	D	L	GF	GA	GD	Win %
Série A	30 May 2021	9 December 2021	Matchday 1	3rd	38	20	6	12	58	43	+15	52.63
Copa do Brasil	3 June 2021	9 June 2021	Third round	Third round	2	1	0	1	1	1	+0	50.00
Campeonato Paulista	3 March 2021	23 May 2021	Matchday 1	Runners-up	16	8	4	4	21	12	+9	50.00
Copa Libertadores	21 April 2021	27 November 2021	Group stage	Winners	13	9	3	1	29	10	+19	69.23
Recopa Sudamericana	7 April 2021	14 April 2021	Final	Runners-up	2	1	0	1	3	3	+0	50.00
Supercopa do Brasil	11 April 2021		Final	Runners-up	1	0	1	0	2	2	+0	0.00
FIFA Club World Cup	8 February 2022	12 February 2022	Semi-finals	Runners-up	2	1	0	1	3	2	+1	50.00
Total					74	40	14	20	117	73	+44	54.05

Source: Competitions

=== Campeonato Paulista ===
Palmeiras was drawn into Group C.

==== First stage ====
Pos	Team	Pld	W	D	L	GF	GA	GD	Pts	Qualification or relegation
1	Red Bull Bragantino	12	6	5	1	15	7	+8	23	Knockout stage
2	Palmeiras	12	6	3	3	18	10	+8	21	Knockout stage
3	Novorizontino	12	5	4	3	17	12	+5	19	Troféu do Interior
4	Ituano	12	4	1	7	10	14	−4	13	Troféu do Interior

Source: Soccerway

3 March 2021 2	Corinthians	2–2	Palmeiras	São Paulo
19:00 UTC−3	Mateus Vital 36'; Rodrigo 47'; Otero (yellow card) 62'; Xavier (yellow card) 82'	Report	Lucas Lima 5'; Gabriel Silva 25'; Fabinho (yellow card) 89'; Renan (yellow card) 90+1'	Stadium: Neo Química Arena; Attendance: 0 Referee: Edina Alves Batista

11 March 2021 1	Palmeiras	3–0	São Caetano	São Paulo
19:00 UTC−3	Tony 12' (o.g.); Breno Lopes 37'; Lucas Lima 41'	Report	Caetano (yellow card) 15'; Luiz Silva (yellow card) 39'	Stadium: Allianz Parque; Attendance: 0 Referee: Thiago Duarte Peixoto
Note: Match postponed to March 11 due to the Palmeiras involvement in the 2020 Copa do Brasil Finals.

14 March 2021 4	Palmeiras	2–0	Ferroviária	São Paulo
16:00 UTC−3	Patrick de Paula (yellow card) 17'; Danilo 54', (yellow card) 59'; Rafael Elias 90+3'	Report		Stadium: Allianz Parque; Attendance: 0 Referee: Flávio Rodrigues de Souza

24 March 2021 3	São Bento	1–1	Palmeiras	Volta Redonda, Rio de Janeiro
22:00 UTC−3	Diego Tavares 29'; Julinho (yellow card) 32'; Fábio Bahia (yellow card) 60'	Report	Weverton (red card) 24'; Gómez 40' (pen.); Danilo (yellow card) 44'; Gabriel Silva (yellow card) 90+2'	Stadium: Estádio Raulino de Oliveira; Attendance: 0 Referee: Salim Fende Chavez
Note: Originally this match would be played at the Estádio Municipal Walter Ribeiro in Sorocaba but it was moved to the Estádio Independência in Belo Horizonte, Minas Gerais due to São Paulo government not allowing the match to take place due the COVID-19 pandemic. However, one day after, the Minas Gerais government also not allowed the match to take place citing as well the COVID-19 pandemic. On March 23, 2021 it was confirmed that the match will be played in the Estádio Raulino de Oliveira in Volta Redonda, Rio de Janeiro.

16 April 2021 5	Palmeiras	0–1	São Paulo	São Paulo
22:00 UTC−3	Felipe Melo (yellow card) 59'; Fabinho (yellow card) 73'	Report	Pablo 62'; Rodrigo Nestor (yellow card) 83'	Stadium: Allianz Parque; Attendance: 0 Referee: Raphael Claus

18 April 2021 6	Botafogo	0–0	Palmeiras	Ribeirão Preto
20:00 UTC−3	Victor Ramos (yellow card) 78'; Rodrigo Ferreira (yellow card) 79'; Kaio Magno (yellow card) 90+3'	Report	Lucas Esteves (yellow card) 55'; Gabriel Silva (yellow card) 59'; Williams (yellow card) 85'	Stadium: Estádio Santa Cruz; Attendance: 0 Referee: Luiz Flávio de Oliveira

23 April 2021 7	Guarani	1–2	Palmeiras	Campinas
20:00 UTC−3	Andrigo 14'; Rodrigo Andrade (yellow card) 45+4'; Matheus Bidu (yellow card) 59'	Report	Renan (yellow card) 42'; Mateus Ludke 45+2' (o.g.); Willian 70'	Stadium: Estádio Brinco de Ouro; Attendance: 0 Referee: Vinícius Gonçalves Dias Araújo

25 April 2021 8	Palmeiras	1–2	Mirassol	São Paulo
20:00 UTC−3	Williams 90+5'	Report	Fabrício Daniel 29'; Neto Moura (yellow card) 45+1' (yellow-red card) 60'; Diego Gonçalves 48'; Alex Muralha (yellow card) 68'	Stadium: Allianz Parque; Attendance: 0 Referee: Douglas Marques das Flores

29 April 2021 9	Palmeiras	0–1	Inter de Limeira	São Paulo
22:00 UTC−3	Zé Rafael (yellow card) 10'; Giovani (yellow card) 57'	Report	Deivid (yellow card) 13'; Roger (yellow card) 68'; Bruno Xavier 90+4'	Stadium: Allianz Parque; Attendance: 0 Referee: Raphael Claus

2 May 2021 10	Santo André	0–1	Palmeiras	São Paulo
20:00 UTC−3	Caio Rangel (yellow card) 64'	Report	Gustavo Scarpa 21'; Viña (yellow card) 29'; Henri (yellow card) 45+1'; Jailson (yellow card) 90+4'	Stadium: Estádio do Canindé; Attendance: 0 Referee: Thiago Luis Scarascati

6 May 2021 11	Palmeiras	3–2	Santos	São Paulo
21:00 UTC−3	Viña 8'; Willian 23'; Zé Rafael (yellow card) 37'; Empereur (yellow card) 53'; Lucas Esteves 78'	Report	Kaio Jorge 14', 53' (pen.); Gabriel Pirani (yellow card) 60'; Jean Mota (yellow card) 63'; Lucas Braga (yellow card) 80'; Kaiky (yellow card) 82'	Stadium: Allianz Parque; Attendance: 0 Referee: Luiz Flávio de Oliveira

9 May 2021 12	Ponte Preta	0–3	Palmeiras	Campinas
16:00 UTC−3		Report	Gustavo Scarpa 35'; Willian 45+3'; Wesley 46'	Stadium: Estádio Moisés Lucarelli; Attendance: 0 Referee: Flávio Rodrigues de Souza

==== Quarter-final ====
14 May 2021	Red Bull Bragantino	0–1	Palmeiras	Bragança Paulista
19:30 UTC−3	Lucas Evangelista (yellow card) 45+1'; Ligger (yellow card) 46'	Report	Viña (yellow card) 41'; Rony 78'	Stadium: Nabi Abi Chedid; Attendance: 0 Referee: Raphael Claus

==== Semi-final ====
16 May 2021	Corinthians	0–2	Palmeiras	São Paulo
16:00 UTC−3	Ramiro (yellow card) 33'; Gabriel (yellow card) 50'; Otero (yellow card) 63'; Raul Bicalho (yellow card) 90+1'; João Victor (red card) 90+6'; Luan (yellow card) 90+6'	Report	Victor Luis 13'; Luiz Adriano 76'; Luan (yellow card) 90+1'; Weverton (yellow card) 90+4'; Zé Rafael (red card) 90+6'	Stadium: Neo Química Arena; Attendance: 0 Referee: Flávio Rodrigues de Souza

==== Finals ====
20 May 2021 First leg	Palmeiras	0–0	São Paulo	São Paulo
22:00 UTC−3	Rony (yellow card) 28'	Report	Miranda (yellow card) 80'	Stadium: Allianz Parque; Attendance: 0 Referee: Flávio Rodrigues de Souza

23 May 2021 Second leg	São Paulo	2–0 (2–0 agg.)	Palmeiras	São Paulo
16:00 UTC−3	Liziero (yellow card) 10'; Igor Gomes (yellow card) 25'; Luan 36'; Bruno Alves (yellow card) 68'; Luciano 77'	Report	Renan (yellow card) 32'; Lucas Lima (yellow card) 34'; Wesley (yellow card) 70'	Stadium: Morumbi; Attendance: 0 Referee: Raphael Claus

=== Copa Libertadores ===
==== Group stage ====
The draw for the group stage was held on 9 April 2021, 12:00 PYST (UTC−4), at the CONMEBOL Convention Centre in Luque, Paraguay.

Pos	Team	Pld	W	D	L	GF	GA	GD	Pts	Qualification
1	(Brazil) Palmeiras	6	5	0	1	20	7	+13	15	Round of 16
2	(Argentina) Defensa y Justicia	6	2	3	1	11	8	+3	9	Round of 16
3	(Ecuador) Independiente del Valle	6	1	2	3	8	11	−3	5	Copa Sudamericana
4	(Peru) Universitario	6	1	1	4	6	19	−13	4	

Source: CONMEBOL
Rules for classification: 1) Points; 2) Goal difference; 3) Goals scored; 4) Away goals scored; 5) CONMEBOL ranking.

21 April 2021 1	Universitario (Peru)	2–3	(Brazil) Palmeiras	Lima, Peru
21:00 UTC−3	Quintero (yellow card) 22'; Valverde (yellow card) 35'; Gutiérrez 65', 68' (pen.); Alonso (yellow card) 78'; Barreto (yellow card) 84'; Urruti (yellow card) 88'	Report	Danilo 20', (yellow card) 82'; Empereur (yellow card) 28' (yellow-red card) 64'; Raphael Veiga 52'; Patrick de Paula (yellow card) 66'; Renan (yellow card) 72', (goal) 90+5'; Felipe Melo (yellow card) 77'	Stadium: Estadio Monumental; Attendance: 0 Referee: Christian Ferreyra (Uruguay)

27 April 2021 2	Palmeiras (Brazil)	5–0	(Ecuador) Independiente del Valle	São Paulo, Brazil
21:30 UTC−3	Rony 11', 74'; Luiz Adriano 20'; Patrick de Paula (yellow card) 64', (goal) 65'; Danilo Barbosa 81'	Report	Segovia (yellow card) 9'; García (yellow card) 25'	Stadium: Allianz Parque; Attendance: 0 Referee: Roberto Tobar (Chile)

4 May 2021 3	Defensa y Justicia (Argentina)	1–2	(Brazil) Palmeiras	Florencio Varela, Argentina
21:30 UTC−3	Hachen (yellow card) 19'; Bou (yellow card) 36'; Loaiza (yellow card) 43'; Brítez (yellow card) 53'; Tripichio 68'; J. Rodríguez (yellow card) 83'	Report	Rony 47', 56'; Victor Luis (yellow card) 54'	Stadium: Estadio Norberto Tomaghello; Attendance: 0 Referee: Wilmar Roldán (Colombia)

11 May 2021 4	Independiente del Valle (Ecuador)	0–1	(Brazil) Palmeiras	Quito, Ecuador
21:30 UTC−3	Landázuri (yellow card) 29'; Vite (yellow card) 39'; Ramírez (yellow card) 42'	Report	Patrick de Paula (yellow card) 28'; Felipe Melo (yellow card) 33'; Raphael Veiga 43' (pen.)	Stadium: Estadio Rodrigo Paz Delgado; Attendance: 0 Referee: Jesús Valenzuela (Venezuela)

18 May 2021 5	Palmeiras (Brazil)	3–4	(Argentina) Defensa y Justicia	São Paulo, Brazil
19:15 UTC−3	Zé Rafael 11'; Willian 35'; Gustavo Scarpa (yellow card) 71', (goal) 75'; Luan (yellow card) 78'; Vanderlan (yellow card) 82' (yellow-red card) 90'	Report	Bou 9', 27'; Rodríguez (yellow card) 41', (goal) 52'; Frías (yellow card) 45+2'; Tripichio (yellow card) 54'; Brítez (yellow card) 79'; Romero 90+4', (yellow card) 90+6'	Stadium: Allianz Parque; Attendance: 0 Referee: Andrés Cunha (Uruguay)

27 May 2021 6	Palmeiras (Brazil)	6–0	(Peru) Universitario	São Paulo, Brazil
19:00 UTC−3	Viña 42'; Zé Rafael 45+2'; Gómez 55'; Willian 60'; Rony 77', 90'; Gustavo Scarpa (yellow card) 82'	Report	Rugel (yellow card) 13'; Quintero (red card) 17'; Alonso (yellow card) 78'; Zevallos (yellow card) 79'	Stadium: Allianz Parque; Attendance: 0 Referee: Cristián Garay (Chile)

==== Round of 16 ====
The draw for the round of 16 was held on 1 June 2021, 12:00 PYST (UTC−4), at the CONMEBOL Convention Centre in Luque, Paraguay.

14 July 2021 First leg	Universidad Católica (Chile)	0–1	(Brazil) Palmeiras	Santiago, Chile
19:15 UTC−3	Zampedri (yellow card) 42'; Parot (yellow card) 64'; Lanaro (yellow card) 81'	Report	Raphael Veiga 42' (pen.); Marcos Rocha (yellow card) 60'; Viña (yellow card) 65'; Wesley (yellow card) 74'	Stadium: San Carlos de Apoquindo; Attendance: 0 Referee: Andrés Matonte (Uruguay)

21 July 2021 Second leg	Palmeiras (Brazil)	1–0 (2–0 agg.)	(Chile) Universidad Católica	São Paulo, Brazil
19:15 UTC−3	Marcos Rocha (yellow card) 33', (goal) 36'; Felipe Melo (yellow card) 40'; Dudu (yellow card) 75'; Renan (yellow card) 80'; Weverton (yellow card) 86'	Report	Parot (yellow card) 30'; Zampedri (yellow card) 90+5'	Stadium: Allianz Parque; Attendance: 0 Referee: Alexis Herrera (Venezuela)

==== Quarter-finals ====
10 August 2021 First leg	São Paulo (Brazil)	1–1	(Brazil) Palmeiras	São Paulo, Brazil
21:30 UTC−3	Dani Alves (yellow card) 51'; Luan 54'	Report	Renan (yellow card) 47'; Patrick de Paula 74'	Stadium: Morumbi; Attendance: 0 Referee: Néstor Pitana (Argentina)

17 August 2021 Second leg	Palmeiras (Brazil)	3–0 (4–1 agg.)	(Brazil) São Paulo	São Paulo, Brazil
21:30 UTC−3	Raphael Veiga 10'; Dudu 67'; Patrick de Paula 78'	Report	Arboleda (yellow card) 41'; Dani Alves (yellow card) 71'; Vitor Bueno (red card) 82'	Stadium: Allianz Parque; Attendance: 0 Referee: Wilmar Roldán (Colombia)

==== Semi-finals ====
21 September 2021 First leg	Palmeiras (Brazil)	0–0	(Brazil) Atlético Mineiro	São Paulo, Brazil
21:30 UTC−3	Zé Rafael (yellow card) 81'	Report	Zaracho (yellow card) 23'	Stadium: Allianz Parque; Attendance: 0 Referee: Patricio Loustau (Argentina)

28 September 2021 Second leg	Atlético Mineiro (Brazil)	1–1 (1–1 a agg.)	(Brazil) Palmeiras	Belo Horizonte, Brazil
21:30 UTC−3	Nathan Silva (yellow card) 28'; Vargas 52'	Report	Marcos Rocha (yellow card) 64'; Dudu 68'; Luan (yellow card) 69'; Felipe Melo (yellow card) 88'	Stadium: Mineirão; Attendance: 18,350; Referee: Wilmar Roldán (Colombia)

==== Final ====
27 November 2021	Palmeiras (Brazil)	2–1 (a.e.t.)	(Brazil) Flamengo	Montevideo, Uruguay
17:00 UTC−3	Raphael Veiga 5'; Piquerez (yellow card) 67'; Gómez (yellow card) 74'; Deyverson 95'; Felipe Melo (yellow card) 120+1'	Report	Rodrigo Caio (yellow card) 65'; Gabriel 72', (yellow card) 74'; de Arrascaeta (yellow card) 78'	Stadium: Estadio Centenario; Attendance: 55,023; Referee: Néstor Pitana (Argentina)

=== Série A ===
==== Standings ====
Pos	Team	Pld	W	D	L	GF	GA	GD	Pts	Qualification or relegation
1	Atlético Mineiro (C)	38	26	6	6	67	34	+33	84	Qualification for Copa Libertadores group stage (Note: Palmeiras qualified for the Copa Libertadores group stage by winning the 2021 Copa Libertadores.)
2	Flamengo	38	21	8	9	69	36	+33	71	Qualification for Copa Libertadores group stage
3	Palmeiras	38	20	6	12	58	43	+15	66	Qualification for Copa Libertadores group stage
4	Fortaleza	38	17	7	14	44	45	−1	58	Qualification for Copa Libertadores group stage
5	Corinthians	38	15	12	11	40	36	+4	57	Qualification for Copa Libertadores group stage

Source: CBF
Rules for classification: 1) points; 2) wins; 3) goal difference; 4) goals scored; 5) head-to-head results (only between two teams); 6) fewest red cards; 7) fewest yellow cards; 8) drawing of lots.
(C) Champions

==== Result by round ====
Round	1	2	3	4	5	6	7	8	9	10	11	12	13	14	15	16	17	18	19	20	21	22	23	24	25	26	27	28	29	30	31	32	33	34	35	36	37	38
Ground	L	W	D	W	W	L	W	W	W	W	W	W	W	D	L	L	L	W	W	L	W	L	D	L	L	D	W	W	W	W	W	L	L	L	D	W	D	W
Position	17	7	9	6	4	5	3	3	3	1	1	1	1	1	2	2	2	2	3	2	2	2	2	3	3	5	4	2	2	2	2	3	3	3	3	3	3	3

Source: CBF
P = Postponed

==== Matches ====
30 May 2021 1	Flamengo	1–0	Palmeiras	Rio de Janeiro
16:00 UTC−3	Pedro 75'; Rodrigo Caio (yellow card) 82'	Report	Viña (yellow card) 54'; Patrick de Paula (yellow card) 58'; Wesley (yellow card) 73'	Stadium: Maracanã; Attendance: 0 Referee: Anderson Daronco (Rio Grande do Sul)

6 June 2021 2	Palmeiras	3–1	Chapecoense	São Paulo
18:15 UTC−3	Wesley 7', 42', (yellow card) 71'; Luiz Adriano 15'; Raphael Veiga (yellow card) 90+3'	Report	Busanello 55'	Stadium: Allianz Parque; Attendance: 0 Referee: Leo Simão Holanda (Ceará)

12 June 2021 3	Palmeiras	1–1	Corinthians	São Paulo
19:00 UTC−3	Raphael Veiga 3'; Renan (yellow card) 50'; Wesley (yellow card) 68'; Felipe Melo (yellow card) 90+1'	Report	Gabriel 55'	Stadium: Allianz Parque; Attendance: 0 Referee: Flávio Rodrigues de Souza (São Paulo)

16 June 2021 4	Juventude	0–3	Palmeiras	Caxias do Sul
21:30 UTC−3		Report	Marcos Rocha (yellow card) 32'; Gabriel Menino (yellow card) 39'; William Matheus 53' (o.g.); Deyverson 63'; Breno Lopes 87', (yellow card) 90'	Stadium: Estádio Alfredo Jaconi; Attendance: 0 Referee: Marielson Alves Silva (Bahia)

20 June 2021 5	Palmeiras	2–1	América Mineiro	São Paulo
11:00 UTC−3	Patrick de Paula (yellow card) 22'; Renan (yellow card) 26'; Willian 39', 90+6'; Jailson (yellow card) 71'	Report	Geovane 38', (yellow card) 84'; Ramon (yellow card) 67'; Alê (yellow card) 79'; Sabino (yellow card) 79'	Stadium: Allianz Parque; Attendance: 0 Referee: Jefferson Ferreira de Moraes (Goiás)

23 June 2021 6	Red Bull Bragantino	3–1	Palmeiras	Bragança Paulista
19:00 UTC−3	Ytalo 10', 45', 88', (yellow card) 73'; Cleiton (yellow card) 45+2'; Aderlan (yellow card) 49'	Report	Marcos Rocha (yellow card) 35'; Breno Lopes 66'; Gustavo Scarpa (yellow card) 80'; Mayke (yellow card) 90+3'	Stadium: Nabi Abi Chedid; Attendance: 0 Referee: Luiz Flávio de Oliveira (São Paulo)

27 June 2021 7	Palmeiras	3–2	Bahia	São Paulo
20:00 UTC−3	Gustavo Scarpa 7'; Danilo (yellow card) 11'; Kuscevic (yellow card) 70'; Raphael Veiga 78'; Breno Lopes 90+2', (yellow card) 90+3'	Report	Luiz Otávio 12'; Rossi (yellow card) 16'; Matheus Bahia (yellow card) 56'; Patrick de Lucca (yellow card) 67'; Thaciano (yellow card) 69'; Maycon Douglas 74'	Stadium: Allianz Parque; Attendance: 0 Referee: Denis Ribeiro Serafim (Alagoas)

30 June 2021 8	Internacional	1–2	Palmeiras	Porto Alegre
19:00 UTC−3	Caio Vidal (yellow card) 45+2'; Rodrigo Dourado (yellow card) 61'; Edenílson 65' (pen.); Cuesta (yellow card) 90+4'	Report	Deyverson 9'; Kuscevic (red card) 62'; Danilo 89'; Patrick de Paula (yellow card) 89'	Stadium: Estádio Beira-Rio; Attendance: 0 Referee: Paulo Roberto Alves Júnior (Paraná)

4 July 2021 9	Sport	0–1	Palmeiras	Recife
16:00 UTC−3	Zé Welison (yellow card) 14'; Paulinho (yellow card) 90+4'	Report	Marcos Rocha (yellow card) 10'; Gustavo Scarpa 38'	Stadium: Ilha do Retiro; Attendance: 0 Referee: Caio Max Augusto Vieira (Rio Grande do Norte)

7 July 2021 10	Palmeiras	2–0	Grêmio	São Paulo
19:00 UTC−3	Raphael Veiga 1'; Gabriel Menino (yellow card) 9', (goal) 17'; Danilo (yellow card) 41'	Report	Matheus Henrique (yellow card) 34'; Vanderson (yellow card) 38'	Stadium: Allianz Parque; Attendance: 0 Referee: Felipe Fernandes de Lima (Minas Gerais)

10 July 2021 11	Palmeiras	3–2	Santos	São Paulo
16:30 UTC−3	Gómez 19'; Breno Lopes 22'; Jailson (yellow card) 77'; Willian 83'	Report	Jean Mota (yellow card) 15'; Camacho (yellow card) 42'; Carlos Sánchez 69' (pen.); Marinho (yellow card) 82', (goal) 90+2' (pen.); Kaiky (yellow card) 87'; Moraes (yellow card) 90+3'; Marcos Guilherme (yellow card) 90+7'	Stadium: Allianz Parque; Attendance: 0 Referee: Bráulio da Silva Machado (Santa Catarina)

18 July 2021 12	Atlético Goianiense	0–3	Palmeiras	Goiânia
16:00 UTC−3	Zé Roberto (yellow card) 64'; Éder (yellow card) 88'	Report	Éder 59' (o.g.); Wesley (yellow card) 66'; Gustavo Scarpa 90+1'; Breno Lopes 90+6'	Stadium: Estádio Antônio Accioly; Attendance: 0 Referee: Denis Ribeiro Serafim (Alagoas)

24 July 2021 13	Palmeiras	1–0	Fluminense	São Paulo
19:00 UTC−3	Manoel 54' (o.g.); Felipe Melo (yellow card) 75'	Report	Fred (yellow card) 28'; Manoel (yellow card) 75'	Stadium: Allianz Parque; Attendance: 0 Referee: Sávio Pereira Sampaio (Distrito Federal)

31 July 2021 14	São Paulo	0–0	Palmeiras	São Paulo
19:00 UTC−3	Gabriel Sara (yellow card) 62'; Rodrigo Nestor (yellow card) 79'; Miranda (yellow card) 90+4'; Rigoni (red card) 90+5'	Report	Breno Lopes (yellow card) 77'; Felipe Melo (yellow card) 78'; Danilo (yellow card) 81'	Stadium: Morumbi; Attendance: 0 Referee: Luiz Flávio de Oliveira (São Paulo)

7 August 2021 15	Palmeiras	2–3	Fortaleza	São Paulo
21:00 UTC−3	Titi 12' (o.g.); Renan (yellow card) 21'; Willian 34'; Zé Rafael (yellow card) 45'; Gómez (yellow card) 57'; Victor Luis (yellow card) 78' (yellow-red card) 90'; Patrick de Paula (yellow card) 83'	Report	Marcelo Benevenuto 18'; Robson 25'; Felipe (yellow card) 36' (yellow-red card) 70'; Igor Torres 90+5', (yellow card) 90+5'	Stadium: Allianz Parque; Attendance: 0 Referee: Wilton Pereira Sampaio (Goiás)

14 August 2021 16	Atlético Mineiro	2–0	Palmeiras	Belo Horizonte
19:00 UTC−3	Savarino 45+3', 62'; Fernández (yellow card) 51'	Report	Patrick de Paula (yellow card) (yellow-red card) 15'	Stadium: Mineirão; Attendance: 0 Referee: Bruno Arleu De Araújo (Rio de Janeiro)

22 August 2021 17	Palmeiras	0–2	Cuiabá	São Paulo
11:00 UTC−3	Deyverson (yellow card) 90+5'	Report	Clayson 2'; Pepê (yellow card) 18'; Uillian Correia 90+4'	Stadium: Allianz Parque; Attendance: 0 Referee: Anderson Daronco (Rio Grande do Sul)

28 August 2021 18	Palmeiras	2–1	Athletico Paranaense	São Paulo
21:00 UTC−3	Luan 22'; Zé Rafael (yellow card) 69'; Rony 71'; Deyverson (yellow card) 82'; Felipe Melo (yellow card) 88'	Report	Bissoli 66'	Stadium: Allianz Parque; Attendance: 0 Referee: Leandro Vuaden (Rio Grande do Sul)

12 September 2021 20	Palmeiras	1–3	Flamengo	São Paulo
16:00 UTC−3	Wesley 15'; Zé Rafael (red card) 90+6'	Report	Michael 17', 81'; Pedro (yellow card) 26', (goal) 57'; Vitinho (yellow card) 84'	Stadium: Allianz Parque; Attendance: 0 Referee: Wilton Pereira Sampaio (Goiás)

18 September 2021 21	Chapecoense	0–2	Palmeiras	Chapecó
17:00 UTC−3	Anderson Leite (yellow card) 41'; Bruno Silva (yellow card) 64'	Report	Patrick de Paula (yellow card) 4'; Raphael Veiga 10'; Luiz Adriano 28'; Felipe Melo (yellow card) 59'	Stadium: Arena Condá; Attendance: 0 Referee: Paulo Roberto Alves Júnior (Paraná)

25 September 2021 22	Corinhtians	2–1	Palmeiras	São Paulo
19:00 UTC−3	Róger Guedes 20', 84'; Fagner (yellow card) 34'	Report	Patrick de Paula (yellow card) 32'; Gabriel Menino 45+2'	Stadium: Neo Química Arena; Attendance: 0 Referee: Raphael Claus (São Paulo)

3 October 2021 23	Palmeiras	1–1	Juventude	São Paulo
18:15 UTC−3	Danilo 29'; Dudu (yellow card) 73'	Report	Guilherme Castilho 6'; Jadson (yellow card) 78'	Stadium: Allianz Parque; Attendance: 0 Referee: Marcelo de Lima Henrique (Rio de Janeiro)

6 October 2021 24	América Mineiro	2–1	Palmeiras	Belo Horizonte
21:30 UTC−3	Eduardo Bauermann (yellow card) 49'; Patric 73', (yellow card) 85'; Ademir 90+3' (pen.)	Report	Gabriel Menino (yellow card) 15'; Rony 29'; Jorge (yellow card) 60'; Felipe Melo (yellow card) 90+2'	Stadium: Estádio Independência; Referee: Leandro Vuaden (Rio Grande do Sul)

9 October 2021 25	Palmeiras	2–4	Red Bull Bragantino	São Paulo
21:00 UTC−3	Dudu 43'; Raphael Veiga 62' (pen.); Gabriel Veron (yellow card) 72'	Report	Ytalo 13'; Cuello 34'; Artur 36', 76'; Aderlan (yellow card) 48'; Fabrício Bruno (yellow card) 62'	Stadium: Allianz Parque; Attendance: 8,884; Referee: Rafael Traci (Paraná)

12 October 2021 26	Bahia	0–0	Palmeiras	Salvador
21:30 UTC−3	Ramírez (yellow card) 41'; Daniel (yellow card) 64'; Ronaldo (yellow card) 84'; Mugni (yellow card) 89'	Report	Kuscevic (yellow card) 45+2'; Rony (yellow card) 67'; Wesley (red card) 83'	Stadium: Arena Fonte Nova; Attendance: 4,509; Referee: Ramon Abatti (Santa Catarina)

17 October 2021 27	Palmeiras	1–0	Internacional	São Paulo
16:00 UTC−3	Felipe Melo (yellow card) 14'; Raphael Veiga 52' (pen.); Rony (yellow card) 75'; Gustavo Scarpa (yellow card) 90+2'	Report	Patrick (yellow card) 16'; Cuesta (yellow card) 37'; Edenílson (red card) 50'; Mercado (yellow card) 54'; Heitor (yellow card) 90+4'	Stadium: Allianz Parque; Attendance: 11,111; Referee: Bráulio da Silva Machado (Santa Catarina)

20 October 2021 19	Ceará	1–2	Palmeiras	Fortaleza
19:00 UTC−3	Igor (yellow card) 59'; Vina (yellow card) 78'; Erick (yellow card) 80'; Cléber 89'; Luiz Otávio (yellow card) 90'	Report	Zé Rafael 45+4', (yellow card) 81'; Deyverson 72'; Weverton (yellow card) 90+5'	Stadium: Arena Castelão; Attendance: 6,204; Referee: André Luiz de Freitas Castro (Goiás)
Note: Match originally was to be disputed in 5 September 2021 but it was postponed due clubs that have athletes called up for the Brazil national team.

25 October 2021 28	Palmeiras	2–1	Sport	São Paulo
21:30 UTC−3	Luiz Adriano 53'; Felipe Melo 81'; Gómez (yellow card) 85'	Report	Barcia 4'; Marcão (yellow card) 36'; Sabino (yellow card) 43'; José Welison (yellow card) 74'	Stadium: Allianz Parque; Attendance: 13,367; Referee: Wagner do Nascimento Magalhães (Rio de Janeiro)

31 October 2021 29	Grêmio	1–3	Palmeiras	Porto Alegre
16:00 UTC−3	Diego Souza 12'; Kannemann (yellow card) 27'; Jean Pyerre (yellow card) 39'; Thiago Santos (yellow card) 64'; Alisson (yellow card) 69'	Report	Raphael Veiga 45+1' (pen.), 45+5'; Felipe Melo (yellow card) 62'; Luan (yellow card) 90+1'; Breno Lopes 90+4'	Stadium: Arena do Grêmio; Attendance: 14,207; Referee: Sávio Pereira Sampaio (Distrito Federal)

7 November 2021 30	Santos	0–2	Palmeiras	Santos
16:00 UTC−3	Raniel (yellow card) 3'; Madson (yellow card) 65'; Felipe Jonatan (yellow card) 78'	Report	Gómez (yellow card) 25'; Zé Rafael (yellow card) 31'; Rony 44'; Raphael Veiga 72'	Stadium: Vila Belmiro; Attendance: 13,165; Referee: Raphael Claus (São Paulo)

10 November 2021 31	Palmeiras	4–0	Atlético Goianiense	São Paulo
20:30 UTC−3	Raphael Veiga 14'; Rony 32'; Danilo (yellow card) 45'; Gustavo Scarpa 64' (pen.); Breno Lopes 90'	Report	Éder (yellow card) 52'; Janderson (yellow card) 68'; Oliveira (yellow card) 82'	Stadium: Allianz Parque; Attendance: 19,165; Referee: Anderson Daronco (Rio Grande do Sul)

14 November 2021 32	Fluminense	2–1	Palmeiras	Rio de Janeiro
18:15 UTC−3	Fred (yellow card) 45+2', (red card) 90+7'; Yago Felipe 46', 88'; Samuel Xavier (yellow card) 90+4'; Gabriel Teixeira (yellow card) 90+6'; David Braz (yellow card) 90+7'	Report	Dudu 28', (yellow card) 45+4' (yellow-red card) 90+4'; Victor Luis (yellow card) 36'; Felipe Melo (yellow card) 60'; Luan (yellow card) 67'; Weverton (yellow card) 90+4'; Deyverson (yellow card) 90+7'	Stadium: Maracanã; Attendance: 7,969; Referee: Caio Max Augusto Vieira (Rio Grande do Norte)

17 November 2021 33	Palmeiras	0–2	São Paulo	São Paulo
20:30 UTC−3	Patrick de Paula (yellow card) 42'	Report	Gabriel Sara 24'; Vitor Bueno (yellow card) 57'; Luciano 61'; Éder (yellow card) 82'	Stadium: Allianz Parque; Attendance: 35,570; Referee: Marcelo de Lima Henrique (Rio de Janeiro)

20 November 2021 34	Fortaleza	1–0	Palmeiras	Fortaleza
19:00 UTC−3	David (yellow card) 5'; Marcelo Benevenuto (yellow card) 13'; Robson 39'; Jussa (yellow card) 50'	Report	Zé Rafael (yellow card) 45+3'; Gómez (yellow card) 90+2'	Stadium: Arena Castelão; Attendance: 18,139; Referee: Ramon Abatti (Santa Catarina)

23 November 2021 35	Palmeiras	2–2	Atlético Mineiro	São Paulo
21:30 UTC−3	Marcos Rocha (yellow card) 18'; Wesley 28'; Gabriel Menino (yellow card) 38'; Renan (yellow card) 39'; Deyverson 57', (yellow card) 58'	Report	Zaracho 36'; Diego Costa (yellow card) 39'; Fernández (yellow card) 45+4'; Alonso (yellow card) 54'; Hulk 61'	Stadium: Allianz Parque; Attendance: 17,744; Referee: Anderson Daronco (Rio Grande do Sul)

30 November 2021 36	Cuiabá	1–3	Palmeiras	Cuiabá
22:00 UTC−3	Rafael Gava (yellow card) 25'; Empereur 37', (yellow card) 89'; Uendel (yellow card) 45+3'; Pepê (yellow card) 64'	Report	Gabriel Silva 4'; Giovani 30'; Gabriel Veron 90+1', (yellow card) 44' (yellow-red card) 90+1'; Gustavo Garcia (yellow card) 61'	Stadium: Arena Pantanal; Attendance: 26,612; Referee: Paulo Roberto Alves Júnior (Paraná)

6 December 2021 37	Athletico Paranaense	0–0	Palmeiras	Curitiba
19:00 UTC−3	Fernando Canesin (yellow card) 75'	Report	Matheus Fernandes (yellow card) 45+3'	Stadium: Arena da Baixada; Attendance: 19,308; Referee: Wagner do Nascimento Magalhães (Rio de Janeiro)

9 December 2021 38	Palmeiras	1–0	Ceará	Barueri
21:30 UTC−3	Kevin 42'; Vitinho (yellow card) 55'; Gabriel Silva (yellow card) 76'	Report		Stadium: Arena Barueri; Attendance: 5,304; Referee: Sávio Pereira Sampaio (Distrito Federal)

=== Copa do Brasil ===
==== Third round ====
The draw for the third round was held on 23 April 2021 at CBF headquarters in Rio de Janeiro.

3 June 2021 First leg	CRB (Alagoas)	0–1	(São Paulo (state)) Palmeiras	Maceió
21:30 UTC−3		Report	Luan (yellow card) 10'; Willian 42'; Patrick de Paula (yellow card) 64'	Stadium: Estádio Rei Pelé; Attendance: 0 Referee: Ramon Abatti Abel (Santa Catarina)

9 June 2021 Second leg	Palmeiras (São Paulo (state))	0–1 (1–1 agg.) (3–4 p)	(Alagoas) CRB	São Paulo
19:00 UTC−3	Luan (yellow card) 69'	Report	Ewandro 6', (yellow card) 63'; Gum (yellow card) 51'; Frazan (yellow card) 71'	Stadium: Allianz Parque; Attendance: 0 Referee: Antônio Dib Moraes de Sousa (Piauí)
	Penalties
	Willian (penalty scored); Gustavo Scarpa (penalty scored); Lucas Lima (penalty missed); Breno Lopes (penalty missed); Luiz Adriano (penalty missed); Victor Luis (penalty scored); Marcos Rocha (penalty missed)		(penalty scored) Diego Torres; (penalty missed) Guilherme Romão; (penalty scored) Hyuri; (penalty missed) Reginaldo; (penalty missed) Dudu; (penalty scored) Jatobá; (penalty scored) Diogo Silva

=== Recopa Sudamericana ===
Palmeiras qualified for the 2021 Recopa Sudamericana by winning the 2020 Copa Libertadores.

7 April 2021 First leg	Defensa y Justicia (Argentina)	1–2	(Brazil) Palmeiras	Florencio Varela, Argentina
21:30 UTC−3	Benítez (yellow card) 26'; Meza (yellow card) 54'; Romero 58'; Rodríguez (yellow card) 90+6'; Frías (yellow card) 90+6'	Report	Rony 16'; Luan (yellow card) 32'; Lucas Lima (yellow card) 35'; Gustavo Scarpa 75', (yellow card) 88'; Patrick de Paula (yellow card) 79'; Viña (yellow card) 84'	Stadium: Estadio Norberto Tomaghello; Attendance: 0 Referee: Andrés Rojas (Colombia)

14 April 2021 Second leg	Palmeiras (Brazil)	1–2 (a.e.t.) (3–3 agg.) (3–4 p)	(Argentina) Defensa y Justicia	Brasília, Brazil
21:30 UTC−3	Raphael Veiga 23' (pen.); Wesley (yellow card) 59'; Viña (red card) 68'; Patrick de Paula (yellow card) 82'; Marcos Rocha (yellow card) 90+1'; Rony (yellow card) 110'	Report	Romero 30', (red card) 98'; Loaiza (yellow card) 63'; Benítez (yellow card) 84', (goal) 90+3'; Frías (yellow card) 100'	Stadium: Estádio Nacional Mané Garrincha; Attendance: 0 Referee: Leodán Gonzalez (Uruguay)
	Penalties
	Gabriel Menino (penalty scored); Luiz Adriano (penalty missed); Gustavo Gómez (penalty scored); Rony (penalty scored); Weverton (penalty missed)		(penalty scored) Frías; (penalty scored) Merentiel; (penalty scored) Isnaldo; (penalty scored) Fernández

=== Supercopa do Brasil ===
Palmeiras qualified for the 2021 Supercopa do Brasil by winning the 2020 Copa do Brasil.

11 April 2021	Flamengo (Rio de Janeiro (state))	2–2 (6–5 p)	(São Paulo (state)) Palmeiras	Brasília
11:00 UTC−3	Gabriel 23'; Isla (yellow card) 42'; De Arrascaeta 45+4'; Rodrigo Caio (yellow card) 72'; Willian Arão (yellow card) 77'	Report	Raphael Veiga 2', 74' (pen.); Felipe Melo (yellow card) 10'; Wesley (yellow card) 12'; Luan (yellow card) 54'; Mayke (yellow card) 81'	Stadium: Estádio Nacional Mané Garrincha; Attendance: 0 Referee: Leandro Vuaden (Rio Grande do Sul)
	Penalties
	De Arrascaeta (penalty scored); Filipe Luís (penalty missed); Matheuzinho (penalty missed); Vitinho (penalty scored); Gabriel (penalty scored); Gomes (penalty scored); Pepê (penalty missed); Michael (penalty scored); Rodrigo Caio (penalty scored)		(penalty scored) Raphael Veiga; (penalty scored) Gómez; (penalty scored) Gustavo Scarpa; (penalty missed) Luan; (penalty missed) Danilo; (penalty scored) Viña; (penalty missed) Gabriel Menino; (penalty scored) Gabriel Veron; (penalty missed) Mayke

=== FIFA Club World Cup ===
Palmeiras qualified for the 2021 FIFA Club World Cup by winning the 2021 Copa Libertadores.

==== Semi-final ====
8 February 2022	Palmeiras (Brazil)	2–0	(Egypt) Al Ahly	Abu Dhabi, United Arab Emirates
20:30 UTC+4	Raphael Veiga 39'; Dudu 49'	Report	Ashraf (red card) 81'; Afsha (yellow card) 90+1'	Stadium: Al Nahyan Stadium; Attendance: 11,902; Referee: Clément Turpin (France)

==== Final ====
12 February 2022	Chelsea (England)	2–1 (a.e.t.)	(Brazil) Palmeiras	Abu Dhabi, United Arab Emirates
20:30 UTC+4	Lukaku 54'; Havertz 117' (pen.), (yellow card) 118'	Report	Raphael Veiga 64' (pen.); Wesley (yellow card) 105'; Luan (yellow card) 115', (red card) 120+6'; Atuesta (yellow card) 116'	Stadium: Mohammed bin Zayed Stadium; Attendance: 32,871; Referee: Chris Beath (Australia)

== Statistics ==
=== Overall statistics ===
Games played	74 (16 Campeonato Paulista, 13 Copa Libertadores, 38 Série A, 2 Copa do Brasil, 2 Recopa Sudamericana, 1 Supercopa do Brasil, 2 FIFA Club World Cup)
Games won	40 (8 Campeonato Paulista, 9 Copa Libertadores, 20 Série A, 1 Copa do Brasil, 1 Recopa Sudamericana, 0 Supercopa do Brasil, 1 FIFA Club World Cup)
Games drawn	14 (4 Campeonato Paulista, 3 Copa Libertadores, 6 Série A, 0 Copa do Brasil, 0 Recopa Sudamericana, 1 Supercopa do Brasil, 0 FIFA Club World Cup)
Games lost	20 (4 Campeonato Paulista, 1 Copa Libertadores, 11 Série A, 1 Copa do Brasil, 1 Recopa Sudamericana, 0 Supercopa do Brasil, 1 FIFA Club World Cup)
Goals scored	117
Goals conceded	73
Goal difference	+44 (+9 Campeonato Paulista, +19 Copa Libertadores, +15 Série A, 0 Copa do Brasil, 0 Recopa Sudamericana, 0 Supercopa do Brasil, +1 FIFA Club World Cup)
Clean sheets	30
Most clean sheets	Weverton (19)
Best result	6–0 (vs. Universitario, Copa Libertadores – May 27)
Worst result	0–2 (vs. São Paulo, Campeonato Paulista – May 23); 1–3 (vs. Red Bull Bragantino, Campeonato Brasileiro – June 23); 0–2 (vs. Atlético Mineiro, Campeonato Brasileiro – August 14); 0–2 (vs. Cuiabá, Campeonato Brasileiro – August 22); 1–3 (vs. Flamengo, Campeonato Brasileiro – September 12); 2–4 (vs. Red Bull Bragantino, Campeonato Brasileiro – October 9); 0–2 (vs. São Paulo, Campeonato Brasileiro – November 17)
Yellow cards	159
Red cards	13
Top scorer	Raphael Veiga (20 goals)

=== Goalscorers ===
In italic players who left the team in mid-season.

Place	Position	Nationality	Number	Name	Campeonato Paulista	Copa Libertadores	Série A	Copa do Brasil	Recopa Sudamericana	Supercopa do Brasil	FIFA Club World Cup	Total
1	MF	(Brazil)	23	Raphael Veiga	0	5	10	0	1	2	2	20
2	FW	(Brazil)	7	Rony	1	6	4	0	1	0	0	12
3	FW	(Brazil)	29	Willian	3	2	4	1	0	0	0	10
4	MF	(Brazil)	14	Gustavo Scarpa	2	1	4	0	1	0	0	8
4	FW	(Brazil)	19	Breno Lopes	1	0	7	0	0	0	0	8
5	FW	(Brazil)	10	Luiz Adriano	1	1	3	0	0	0	0	5
5	FW	(Brazil)	11	Wesley	1	0	4	0	0	0	0	5
5	FW	(Brazil)	16/9	Deyverson	0	1	4	0	0	0	0	5
5	FW	(Brazil)	43	Dudu	0	2	2	0	0	0	1	5
6	MF	(Brazil)	28	Danilo	1	1	2	0	0	0	0	4
7	DF	(Paraguay)	15	Gustavo Gómez	1	1	1	0	0	0	0	3
7	MF	(Brazil)	5	Patrick de Paula	0	3	0	0	0	0	0	3
7	MF	(Brazil)	8	Zé Rafael	0	2	1	0	0	0	0	3
8	MF	(Brazil)	20	Lucas Lima	2	0	0	0	0	0	0	2
8	DF	(Uruguay)	17	Matías Viña	1	1	0	0	0	0	0	2
8	MF	(Brazil)	25	Gabriel Menino	0	0	2	0	0	0	0	2
8	FW	(Brazil)	49	Gabriel Silva	1	0	1	0	0	0	0	2
9	FW	(Brazil)	37	Rafael Elias	1	0	0	0	0	0	0	1
9	DF	(Brazil)	3	Renan	0	1	0	0	0	0	0	1
9	FW	(Panama)	48	Williams	1	0	0	0	0	0	0	1
9	MF	(Brazil)	18	Danilo Barbosa	0	1	0	0	0	0	0	1
9	DF	(Brazil)	6	Lucas Esteves	1	0	0	0	0	0	0	1
9	DF	(Brazil)	26	Victor Luis	1	0	0	0	0	0	0	1
9	DF	(Brazil)	2	Marcos Rocha	0	1	0	0	0	0	0	1
9	DF	(Brazil)	13	Luan	0	0	1	0	0	0	0	1
9	MF	(Brazil)	30	Felipe Melo	0	0	1	0	0	0	0	1
9	FW	(Brazil)	41	Giovanni	0	0	1	0	0	0	0	1
9	FW	(Brazil)	27	Gabriel Veron	0	0	1	0	0	0	0	1
9	FW	(Brazil)	36	Kevin	0	0	1	0	0	0	0	1
