= 2015 Copa Sudamericana elimination stages =

The 2015 Copa Sudamericana elimination stages were played from August 11 to September 17, 2015. A total of 46 teams competed in the elimination stages to decide 15 of the 16 places in the final stages of the 2015 Copa Sudamericana.

== Draw ==
The draw of the tournament was held on July 16, 2015, 20:00 UTC−4, at the Salón Joao Havelange of the CONMEBOL Convention Centre in Luque, Paraguay.

For the first stage, the 32 teams were divided into two zones:

- South Zone: The 16 teams from Bolivia, Chile, Paraguay, and Uruguay were drawn into eight ties.
- North Zone: The 16 teams from Colombia, Ecuador, Peru, and Venezuela were drawn into eight ties.

Teams which qualified for berths 1 were drawn against teams which qualified for berths 4, and teams which qualified for berths 2 were drawn against teams which qualified for berths 3, with the former hosting the second leg in both cases. Teams from the same association could not be drawn into the same tie.

Pots for the first stage draw
Zone	Berths 1	Berths 2	Berths 3	Berths 4
South Zone	(Bolivia) Real Potosí; (Chile) Universidad de Concepción; (Paraguay) Libertad; (Uruguay) Nacional	(Bolivia) Bolívar; (Chile) Huachipato; (Paraguay) Sportivo Luqueño; (Uruguay) Danubio	(Bolivia) Aurora; (Chile) Universidad Católica; (Paraguay) Olimpia; (Uruguay) Defensor Sporting	(Bolivia) Oriente Petrolero; (Chile) Santiago Wanderers; (Paraguay) Nacional; (Uruguay) Juventud
North Zone	(Colombia) Deportes Tolima; (Ecuador) Emelec; (Peru) Melgar; (Venezuela) Deportivo La Guaira	(Colombia) Santa Fe; (Ecuador) LDU Quito; (Peru) Unión Comercio; (Venezuela) Deportivo Anzoátegui	(Colombia) Águilas Doradas; (Ecuador) LDU Loja; (Peru) Universitario; (Venezuela) Zamora	(Colombia) Junior; (Ecuador) Universidad Católica; (Peru) León de Huánuco; (Venezuela) Carabobo

For the second stage, the 30 teams, including the 16 winners of the first stage (eight from South Zone, eight from North Zone), whose identity was not known at the time of the draw, and the 14 teams which entered the second stage, were divided into three sections:

- Winners of the first stage: The 16 winners of the first stage were drawn into eight ties, with the order of legs decided by draw. Teams from the same association could be drawn into the same tie.
- Brazil: The eight teams from Brazil were drawn into four ties. Teams which qualified for berths 1–4 were drawn against teams which qualified for berths 5–8, with the former hosting the second leg.
- Argentina: The six teams from Argentina were drawn into three ties. Teams which qualified for berths 1–3 were drawn against teams which qualified for berths 4–6, with the former hosting the second leg.

Pots for the second stage draw
Winners of the first stage	Brazil		Argentina	
Winners of the first stage	Seeded	Unseeded	Seeded	Unseeded
Winner G1; Winner G2; Winner G3; Winner G4; Winner G5; Winner G6; Winner G7; Winner G8; Winner G9; Winner G10; Winner G11; Winner G12; Winner G13; Winner G14; Winner G15; Winner G16	1. (Brazil) Atlético Paranaense; 2. (Brazil) Sport Recife; 3. (Brazil) Goiás; 4. (Brazil) Chapecoense	5. (Brazil) Joinville; 6. (Brazil) Ponte Preta; 7. (Brazil) Bahia; 8. (Brazil) Brasília	1. (Argentina) Huracán; 2. (Argentina) Lanús; 3. (Argentina) Independiente	4. (Argentina) Tigre; 5. (Argentina) Arsenal; 6. (Argentina) Belgrano

== Format ==
In the elimination stages (first stage and second stage), each tie was played on a home-and-away two-legged basis. If tied on aggregate, the away goals rule was used. If still tied, the penalty shoot-out was used to determine the winner (no extra time was played). The 15 winners of the second stage (eight from winners of the first stage, four from Brazil, three from Argentina) advanced to the round of 16 to join the defending champions (River Plate).

== First stage ==
The first legs were played on August 11–13, and the second legs were played on August 18–20, 2015.

Team 1	Agg.	Team 2	1st leg	2nd leg
South Zone
Juventud (Uruguay)	4–3	(Bolivia) Real Potosí	4–1	0–2
Oriente Petrolero (Bolivia)	0–3	(Uruguay) Nacional	0–3	0–0
Santiago Wanderers (Chile)	1–2	(Paraguay) Libertad	0–0	1–2
Nacional (Paraguay)	5–2	(Chile) Universidad de Concepción	2–1	3–1
Defensor Sporting (Uruguay)	3–2	(Bolivia) Bolívar	3–0	0–2
Universidad Católica (Chile)	3–1	(Uruguay) Danubio	1–0	2–1
Olimpia (Paraguay)	4–0	(Chile) Huachipato	2–0	2–0
Aurora (Bolivia)	2–7	(Paraguay) Sportivo Luqueño	1–2	1–5
North Zone
Carabobo (Venezuela)	0–0 (1–3 p)	(Colombia) Deportes Tolima	0–0	0–0
Universidad Católica (Ecuador)	1–2	(Venezuela) Deportivo La Guaira	1–1	0–1
León de Huánuco (Peru)	1–6	(Ecuador) Emelec	1–3	0–3
Junior (Colombia)	5–4	(Peru) Melgar	5–0	0–4
Universitario (Peru)	6–2	(Venezuela) Deportivo Anzoátegui	3–1	3–1
Zamora (Venezuela)	1–3	(Ecuador) LDU Quito	1–1	0–2
Águilas Doradas (Colombia)	3–1	(Peru) Unión Comercio	2–0	1–1
LDU Loja (Ecuador)	0–3	(Colombia) Santa Fe	0–0	0–3

=== Match G1 ===
August 13, 2015
18:30 UTC−3

Juventud (Uruguay)	4–1	(Bolivia) Real Potosí
Mirabaje 20', 66', 68'; Duffard 54'	Report	Loaiza 90+3' (pen.)

Estadio Luis Franzini, Montevideo
Referee: Darío Herrera (Argentina)

August 20, 2015
15:00 UTC−4

Real Potosí (Bolivia)	2–0	(Uruguay) Juventud
Toco 27'; Álvarez 60'	Report

Estadio Víctor Agustín Ugarte, Potosí
Referee: Julio Bascuñán (Chile)

Juventud won 4–3 on aggregate and advanced to the second stage (Match O14).

=== Match G2 ===
August 11, 2015
20:15 UTC−4

Oriente Petrolero (Bolivia)	0–3	(Uruguay) Nacional
	Report	Aja 36'; Barcia 45+1'; Raldes 70' (o.g.)

Estadio Ramón Tahuichi Aguilera, Santa Cruz
Referee: Patricio Loustau (Argentina)

August 20, 2015
21:00 UTC−3

Nacional (Uruguay)	0–0	(Bolivia) Oriente Petrolero
	Report

Estadio Gran Parque Central, Montevideo
Referee: José Argote (Venezuela)

Nacional won 3–0 on aggregate and advanced to the second stage (Match O3).

=== Match G3 ===
August 12, 2015
18:45 UTC−3

Santiago Wanderers (Chile)	0–0	(Paraguay) Libertad
	Report

Estadio Elías Figueroa Brander, Valparaíso
Referee: Wilton Sampaio (Brazil)

August 18, 2015
20:00 UTC−4

Libertad (Paraguay)	2–1	(Chile) Santiago Wanderers
Aquino 5' (pen.); López 46' (pen.)	Report	Fernández 27'

Estadio Dr. Nicolás Léoz, Asunción
Referee: Adrián Vélez (Colombia)

Libertad won 2–1 on aggregate and advanced to the second stage (Match O9).

=== Match G4 ===
August 13, 2015
17:45 UTC−4

Nacional (Paraguay)	2–1	(Chile) Universidad de Concepción
Rodrigo Teixeira 64'; Colmán 88'	Report	Vargas 10'

Estadio Defensores del Chaco, Asunción
Referee: Fernando Rapallini (Argentina)

August 20, 2015
18:30 UTC−3

Universidad de Concepción (Chile)	1–3	(Paraguay) Nacional
Manríquez 86' (pen.)	Report	Riveros 33'; Montenegro 77'; Argüello 90+2'

Estadio Municipal Germán Becker, Temuco
Referee: Hernando Buitrago (Colombia)

Nacional won 5–2 on aggregate and advanced to the second stage (Match O1).

=== Match G5 ===
August 12, 2015
21:00 UTC−3

Defensor Sporting (Uruguay)	3–0	(Bolivia) Bolívar
Rabuñal 25'; Olivera 55'; Lozano 76'	Report

Estadio Luis Franzini, Montevideo
Referee: Julio Quintana (Paraguay)

August 18, 2015
17:30 UTC−4

Bolívar (Bolivia)	2–0	(Uruguay) Defensor Sporting
Ferreira 61', 81'	Report

Estadio Hernando Siles, La Paz
Referee: Anderson Daronco (Brazil)

Defensor Sporting won 3–2 on aggregate and advanced to the second stage (Match O2).

=== Match G6 ===
August 11, 2015
19:00 UTC−3

Universidad Católica (Chile)	1–0	(Uruguay) Danubio
Gutiérrez 84'	Report

Estadio San Carlos de Apoquindo, Santiago
Referee: Raúl Orosco (Bolivia)

August 19, 2015
21:00 UTC−3

Danubio (Uruguay)	1–2	(Chile) Universidad Católica
Olivera 49'	Report	De los Santos 17' (o.g.); González 81'

Estadio Luis Franzini, Montevideo
Referee: Roddy Zambrano (Ecuador)

Universidad Católica won 3–1 on aggregate and advanced to the second stage (Match O9).

=== Match G7 ===
August 12, 2015
20:00 UTC−4

Olimpia (Paraguay)	2–0	(Chile) Huachipato
Núñez 51'; Silva 66'	Report

Estadio Defensores del Chaco, Asunción
Referee: Héber Lopes (Brazil)

August 19, 2015
18:30 UTC−3

Huachipato (Chile)	0–2	(Paraguay) Olimpia
	Report	Núñez 22', 43'

Estadio CAP, Talcahuano
Referee: Andrés Cunha (Uruguay)

Olimpia won 4–0 on aggregate and advanced to the second stage (Match O6).

=== Match G8 ===
August 13, 2015
20:00 UTC−4

Aurora (Bolivia)	1–2	(Paraguay) Sportivo Luqueño
Borda 51'	Report	Delgado 45+2' (o.g.); Leguizamón 75' (pen.)

Estadio Félix Capriles, Cochabamba
Referee: Jorge Osorio (Chile)

August 19, 2015
20:00 UTC−4

Sportivo Luqueño (Paraguay)	5–1	(Bolivia) Aurora
Mendieta 6'; Ortiz 31'; Di Vanni 55', 88'; Ávalos 58' (o.g.)	Report	Banguera 77'

Estadio Feliciano Cáceres, Luque
Referee: Péricles Cortez (Brazil)

Sportivo Luqueño won 7–2 on aggregate and advanced to the second stage (Match O4).

=== Match G9 ===
August 11, 2015
19:30 UTC−4:30

Carabobo (Venezuela)	0–0	(Colombia) Deportes Tolima
	Report

Estadio Misael Delgado, Valencia
Referee: Carlos Orbe (Ecuador)

August 19, 2015
19:00 UTC−5

Deportes Tolima (Colombia)	0–0	(Venezuela) Carabobo
	Report
Penalties
Bonilla (penalty missed); Rivas (penalty scored); Ibargüen (penalty scored); Uribe (penalty scored)	3–1	(penalty missed) Jiménez; (penalty missed) Bareiro; (penalty missed) Suárez; (penalty scored) Ocanto

Estadio Metropolitano de Techo, Bogotá
Referee: Oscar Maldonado (Bolivia)

Tied 0–0 on aggregate, Deportes Tolima won on penalties and advanced to the second stage (Match O13).

=== Match G10 ===
August 11, 2015
16:45 UTC−5

Universidad Católica (Ecuador)	1–1	(Venezuela) Deportivo La Guaira
Martínez 23' (pen.)	Report	Benítez 82'

Estadio Olímpico Atahualpa, Quito
Referee: Wilson Lamouroux (Colombia)

August 18, 2015
19:30 UTC−4:30

Deportivo La Guaira (Venezuela)	1–0	(Ecuador) Universidad Católica
Pérez Greco 41'	Report

Estadio Olímpico, Caracas
Referee: Miguel Santiváñez (Peru)

Deportivo La Guaira won 2–1 on aggregate and advanced to the second stage (Match O4).

=== Match G11 ===
August 13, 2015
14:15 UTC−5

León de Huánuco (Peru)	1–3	(Ecuador) Emelec
Olivi 87'	Report	Bolaños 42', 56', 67'

Estadio Heraclio Tapia, Huánuco
Referee: Roberto Tobar (Chile)

August 20, 2015
19:00 UTC−5

Emelec (Ecuador)	3–0	(Peru) León de Huánuco
Giménez 27'; Herrera 64'; Escalada 79'	Report

Estadio Christian Benítez, Guayaquil
Referee: Carlos Amarilla (Paraguay)

Emelec won 6–1 on aggregate and advanced to the second stage (Match O14).

=== Match G12 ===
August 12, 2015
21:15 UTC−5

Junior (Colombia)	5–0	(Peru) Melgar
Barrera 22'; Pérez 28'; Ovelar 32'; Hernández 35'; Ortega 88'	Report

Estadio Metropolitano Roberto Meléndez, Barranquilla
Referee: Fernando Falce (Uruguay)

August 18, 2015
16:30 UTC−5

Melgar (Peru)	4–0	(Colombia) Junior
Cuesta 4', 45'; Quina 74'; Acasiete 82'	Report

Estadio Monumental Virgen de Chapi, Arequipa
Referee: Patricio Polic (Chile)

Junior won 5–4 on aggregate and advanced to the second stage (Match O13).

=== Match G13 ===
August 11, 2015
21:15 UTC−5

Universitario (Peru)	3–1	(Venezuela) Deportivo Anzoátegui
Giménez 12'; Romero 28'; Alemanno 56'	Report	Aguilar 59'

Estadio Nacional, Lima
Referee: Ulises Mereles (Paraguay)

August 20, 2015
17:00 UTC−4:30

Deportivo Anzoátegui (Venezuela)	1–3	(Peru) Universitario
Aguilar 61'	Report	Dulanto 5'; Ruidíaz 76'; Alemanno 88'

Estadio José Antonio Anzoátegui, Barcelona
Referee: Diego Lara (Ecuador)

Universitario won 6–2 on aggregate and advanced to the second stage (Match O2).

=== Match G14 ===
August 13, 2015
19:15 UTC−4:30

Zamora (Venezuela)	1–1	(Ecuador) LDU Quito
Soteldo 28'	Report	Morales 53'

Estadio Agustín Tovar, Barinas
Referee: Henry Gambetta (Peru)

August 19, 2015
16:30 UTC−5

LDU Quito (Ecuador)	2–0	(Venezuela) Zamora
Morales 19'; Reasco 90+2'	Report

Estadio de Liga Deportiva Universitaria, Quito
Referee: Gery Vargas (Bolivia)

LDU Quito won 3–1 on aggregate and advanced to the second stage (Match O1).

=== Match G15 ===
August 13, 2015
21:00 UTC−5

Águilas Doradas (Colombia)	2–0	(Peru) Unión Comercio
Palomino 70'; Rodríguez 80'	Report

Estadio Atanasio Girardot, Medellín
Referee: Jesús Valenzuela (Venezuela)

August 20, 2015
14:00 UTC−5

Unión Comercio (Peru)	1–1	(Colombia) Águilas Doradas
Villamarín 90+1'	Report	Palomino 72'

Estadio Alberto Gallardo, Lima
Referee: Juan Soto (Venezuela)

Águilas Doradas won 3–1 on aggregate and advanced to the second stage (Match O6).

=== Match G16 ===
August 12, 2015
16:45 UTC−5

LDU Loja (Ecuador)	0–0	(Colombia) Santa Fe
	Report

Estadio Federativo Reina del Cisne, Loja
Referee: Raphael Claus (Brazil)

August 20, 2015
19:00 UTC−5

Santa Fe (Colombia)	3–0	(Ecuador) LDU Loja
Morelo 33' (pen.), 61', 70' (pen.)	Report

Estadio El Campín, Bogotá
Referee: Enrique Cáceres (Paraguay)

Santa Fe won 3–0 on aggregate and advanced to the second stage (Match O3).

== Second stage ==
The first legs were played on August 18–20 and 26–27, and the second legs were played on August 25–27 and September 15–17, 2015.

Team 1	Agg.	Team 2	1st leg	2nd leg
LDU Quito (Ecuador)	2–0	(Paraguay) Nacional	1–0	1–0
Defensor Sporting (Uruguay)	4–0	(Peru) Universitario	3–0	1–0
Nacional (Uruguay)	1–2	(Colombia) Santa Fe	0–2	1–0
Deportivo La Guaira (Venezuela)	1–5	(Paraguay) Sportivo Luqueño	1–1	0–4
Brasília (Brazil)	2–0	(Brazil) Goiás	0–0	2–0
Olimpia (Paraguay)	3–2	(Colombia) Águilas Doradas	1–1	2–1
Tigre (Argentina)	2–6	(Argentina) Huracán	2–5	0–1
Ponte Preta (Brazil)	1–4	(Brazil) Chapecoense	1–1	0–3
Universidad Católica (Chile)	2–4	(Paraguay) Libertad	2–3	0–1
Bahia (Brazil)	2–4	(Brazil) Sport Recife	1–0	1–4
Arsenal (Argentina)	1–2	(Argentina) Independiente	1–1	0–1
Joinville (Brazil)	0–3	(Brazil) Atlético Paranaense	0–2	0–1
Deportes Tolima (Colombia)	2–1	(Colombia) Junior	0–1	2–0
Emelec (Ecuador)	0–0 (3–2 p)	(Uruguay) Juventud	0–0	0–0
Belgrano (Argentina)	2–6	(Argentina) Lanús	1–1	1–5

=== Match O1 ===
August 26, 2015
16:45 UTC−5

LDU Quito (Ecuador)	1–0	(Paraguay) Nacional
Matamoros 39'	Report

Estadio de Liga Deportiva Universitaria, Quito
Referee: Víctor Carrillo (Peru)

September 16, 2015
18:00 UTC−4

Nacional (Paraguay)	0–1	(Ecuador) LDU Quito
	Report	Cavallaro 84' (pen.)

Estadio Defensores del Chaco, Asunción
Referee: Luiz Flávio de Oliveira (Brazil)

LDU Quito won 2–0 on aggregate and advanced to the round of 16 (Match A).

=== Match O2 ===
August 26, 2015
16:30 UTC−3

Defensor Sporting (Uruguay)	3–0	(Peru) Universitario
Acuña 69', 88'; Lozano 75'	Report

Estadio Luis Franzini, Montevideo
Referee: Enrique Osses (Chile)

September 15, 2015
19:30 UTC−5

Universitario (Peru)	0–1	(Uruguay) Defensor Sporting
	Report	Castro 4'

Estadio Monumental, Lima
Referee: Omar Ponce (Ecuador)

Defensor Sporting won 4–0 on aggregate and advanced to the round of 16 (Match B).

=== Match O3 ===
August 27, 2015
19:00 UTC−3

Nacional (Uruguay)	0–2	(Colombia) Santa Fe
	Report	Morelo 63'; Seijas 74'

Estadio Gran Parque Central, Montevideo
Referee: Raúl Orosco (Bolivia)

September 16, 2015
19:00 UTC−5

Santa Fe (Colombia)	0–1	(Uruguay) Nacional
	Report	Romero 68'

Estadio El Campín, Bogotá
Referee: Mauro Vigliano (Argentina)

Santa Fe won 2–1 on aggregate and advanced to the round of 16 (Match C).

=== Match O4 ===
August 27, 2015
17:00 UTC−4:30

Deportivo La Guaira (Venezuela)	1–1	(Paraguay) Sportivo Luqueño
Arrieta 23'	Report	Di Vanni 29'

Estadio Olímpico, Caracas
Referee: Diego Ceballos (Argentina)

September 15, 2015
18:00 UTC−4

Sportivo Luqueño (Paraguay)	4–0	(Venezuela) Deportivo La Guaira
Ortega 7', 85'; Leguizamón 25' (pen.); Ruiz 54'	Report

Estadio Feliciano Cáceres, Luque
Referee: Jonhatan Fuentes (Uruguay)

Sportivo Luqueño won 5–1 on aggregate and advanced to the round of 16 (Match D).

=== Match O5 ===
August 18, 2015
21:15 UTC−3

Brasília (Brazil)	0–0	(Brazil) Goiás
	Report

Estádio Bezerrão, Gama
Referee: Luis Sánchez (Colombia)

August 25, 2015
21:15 UTC−3

Goiás (Brazil)	0–2	(Brazil) Brasília
	Report	André Oliveira 50'; Bruno Morais 54'

Estádio Serra Dourada, Goiânia
Referee: Mario Díaz de Vivar (Paraguay)

Brasília won 2–0 on aggregate and advanced to the round of 16 (Match E).

=== Match O6 ===
August 26, 2015
20:15 UTC−4

Olimpia (Paraguay)	1–1	(Colombia) Águilas Doradas
Núñez 52'	Report	Páez 86'

Estadio Defensores del Chaco, Asunción
Referee: Diego Haro (Peru)

September 15, 2015
19:00 UTC−5

Águilas Doradas (Colombia)	1–2	(Paraguay) Olimpia
Páez 19'	Report	Núñez 3'; Torres 13'

Estadio Atanasio Girardot, Medellín
Referee: Roddy Zambrano (Ecuador)

Olimpia won 3–2 on aggregate and advanced to the round of 16 (Match F).

=== Match O7 ===
August 26, 2015
21:00 UTC−3

Tigre (Argentina)	2–5	(Argentina) Huracán
Wilchez 78'; Luna 80'	Report	Bogado 11' (pen.); Espinoza 21', 44', 59'; Ábila 58'

Estadio José Dellagiovanna, Victoria
Referee: Jonhatan Fuentes (Uruguay)

September 16, 2015
18:30 UTC−3

Huracán (Argentina)	1–0	(Argentina) Tigre
Mancinelli 58'	Report

Estadio Tomás Adolfo Ducó, Buenos Aires
Referee: Jesús Valenzuela (Venezuela)

Huracán won 6–2 on aggregate and advanced to the round of 16 (Match G).

=== Match O8 ===
August 19, 2015
22:00 UTC−3

Ponte Preta (Brazil)	1–1	(Brazil) Chapecoense
Leandrinho 88'	Report	Wagner 56'

Estádio Moisés Lucarelli, Campinas
Referee: Silvio Trucco (Argentina)

August 26, 2015
22:00 UTC−3

Chapecoense (Brazil)	3–0	(Brazil) Ponte Preta
Roger 45' (pen.); Tiago Luís 61'; Bruno Silva 75'	Report

Arena Condá, Chapecó
Referee: Mauro Vigliano (Argentina)

Chapecoense won 4–1 on aggregate and advanced to the round of 16 (Match H).

=== Match O9 ===
August 27, 2015
20:45 UTC−3

Universidad Católica (Chile)	2–3	(Paraguay) Libertad
González 8'; Llanos 31'	Report	Aquino 51' (pen.); Ortiz 54'; Recalde 86'

Estadio San Carlos de Apoquindo, Santiago
Referee: Darío Ubriaco (Uruguay)

September 17, 2015
20:00 UTC−4

Libertad (Paraguay)	1–0	(Chile) Universidad Católica
López 16'	Report

Estadio Dr. Nicolás Léoz, Asunción
Referee: Wilmar Roldán (Colombia)

Libertad won 4–2 on aggregate and advanced to the round of 16 (Match H).

=== Match O10 ===
August 19, 2015
22:00 UTC−3

Bahia (Brazil)	1–0	(Brazil) Sport Recife
Biancucchi 24'	Report

Itaipava Arena Fonte Nova, Salvador
Referee: Germán Delfino (Argentina)

August 26, 2015
22:00 UTC−3

Sport Recife (Brazil)	4–1	(Brazil) Bahia
Rithely 51'; Hernane 78', 90+4'; Élber 85'	Report	Biancucchi 73'

Estádio Ilha do Retiro, Recife
Referee: Roberto Tobar (Chile)

Sport Recife won 4–2 on aggregate and advanced to the round of 16 (Match G).

=== Match O11 ===
August 26, 2015
19:00 UTC−3

Arsenal (Argentina)	1–1	(Argentina) Independiente
Lértora 31'	Report	Vitale 69'

Estadio Julio Humberto Grondona, Sarandí
Referee: Leandro Vuaden (Brazil)

September 16, 2015
21:30 UTC−3

Independiente (Argentina)	1–0	(Argentina) Arsenal
Albertengo 86'	Report

Estadio Libertadores de América, Avellaneda
Referee: Andrés Cunha (Uruguay)

Independiente won 2–1 on aggregate and advanced to the round of 16 (Match F).

=== Match O12 ===
August 20, 2015
21:15 UTC−3

Joinville (Brazil)	0–2	(Brazil) Atlético Paranaense
	Report	Walter 42'; Douglas Coutinho 69'

Arena Joinville, Joinville
Referee: Christian Ferreyra (Uruguay)

August 27, 2015
21:15 UTC−3

Atlético Paranaense (Brazil)	1–0	(Brazil) Joinville
Nikão 24'	Report

Arena da Baixada, Curitiba
Referee: Wilson Lamouroux (Colombia)

Atlético Paranaense won 3–0 on aggregate and advanced to the round of 16 (Match E).

=== Match O13 ===
August 26, 2015
21:15 UTC−5

Deportes Tolima (Colombia)	0–1	(Colombia) Junior
	Report	Hernández 72' (pen.)

Estadio Metropolitano de Techo, Bogotá
Referee: Gery Vargas (Bolivia)

September 17, 2015
16:30 UTC−5

Junior (Colombia)	0–2	(Colombia) Deportes Tolima
	Report	Estrada 22'; Delgado 45+1'

Estadio Metropolitano Roberto Meléndez, Barranquilla
Referee: Raphael Claus (Brazil)

Deportes Tolima won 2–1 on aggregate and advanced to the round of 16 (Match D).

=== Match O14 ===
August 27, 2015
21:00 UTC−5

Emelec (Ecuador)	0–0	(Uruguay) Juventud
	Report

Estadio Christian Benítez, Guayaquil
Referee: Néstor Pitana (Argentina)

September 17, 2015
18:30 UTC−3

Juventud (Uruguay)	0–0	(Ecuador) Emelec
	Report
Penalties
Carini (penalty missed); Mirabaje (penalty scored); Romero (penalty missed); Varela (penalty scored); Reyes (penalty missed)	2–3	(penalty scored) Bolaños; (penalty scored) Guagua; (penalty missed) Mina; (penalty scored) Gaibor

Estadio Luis Franzini, Montevideo
Referee: Enrique Cáceres (Paraguay)

Tied 0–0 on aggregate, Emelec won on penalties and advanced to the round of 16 (Match C).

=== Match O15 ===
August 27, 2015
21:15 UTC−3

Belgrano (Argentina)	1–1	(Argentina) Lanús
Márquez 1'	Report	Gómez 88'

Estadio Mario Alberto Kempes, Córdoba
Referee: Sandro Ricci (Brazil)

September 17, 2015
21:00 UTC−3

Lanús (Argentina)	5–1	(Argentina) Belgrano
Aguirre 3' (pen.); Braghieri 39'; Farré 59' (o.g.); Almirón 77'; Di Renzo 90'	Report	Velázquez 68'

Estadio Ciudad de Lanús, Lanús
Referee: Antonio Arias (Paraguay)

Lanús won 6–2 on aggregate and advanced to the round of 16 (Match B).
