= 2015 Copa Sudamericana final stages =

The 2015 Copa Sudamericana final stages were played from September 22 to December 9, 2015. A total of 16 teams competed in the final stages to decide the champions of the 2015 Copa Sudamericana.

== Qualified teams ==
The 15 winners of the second stage (eight from winners of the first stage, four from Brazil, three from Argentina) and the defending champions qualified for the final stages.

Winners of the second stage			Defending champions
Winners of the first stage	Brazil	Argentina	Defending champions
Winner O6: (Paraguay) Olimpia; Winner O3: (Colombia) Santa Fe; Winner O1: (Ecuador) LDU Quito; Winner O13: (Colombia) Deportes Tolima; Winner O9: (Paraguay) Libertad; Winner O2: (Uruguay) Defensor Sporting; Winner O14: (Ecuador) Emelec; Winner O4: (Paraguay) Sportivo Luqueño	Winner O5: (Brazil) Brasília; Winner O10: (Brazil) Sport Recife; Winner O8: (Brazil) Chapecoense; Winner O12: (Brazil) Atlético Paranaense	Winner O15: (Argentina) Lanús; Winner O11: (Argentina) Independiente; Winner O7: (Argentina) Huracán	Winner O16: (Argentina) River Plate

== Seeding ==
The qualified teams were seeded in the final stages according to the draw of the tournament, which was held on July 16, 2015, 20:00 UTC−4, at the Salón Joao Havelange of the CONMEBOL Convention Centre in Luque, Paraguay, with each team assigned a "seed" 1–16 by draw.

Seed	Team	Round of 16
1	(Ecuador) LDU Quito	Match A
2	(Uruguay) Defensor Sporting	Match B
3	(Colombia) Santa Fe	Match C
4	(Paraguay) Sportivo Luqueño	Match D
5	(Brazil) Brasília	Match E
6	(Paraguay) Olimpia	Match F
7	(Argentina) Huracán	Match G
8	(Brazil) Chapecoense	Match H
9	(Paraguay) Libertad	Match H
10	(Brazil) Sport Recife	Match G
11	(Argentina) Independiente	Match F
12	(Brazil) Atlético Paranaense	Match E
13	(Colombia) Deportes Tolima	Match D
14	(Ecuador) Emelec	Match C
15	(Argentina) Lanús	Match B
16	(Argentina) River Plate	Match A

== Format ==
In the final stages, the 16 teams played a single-elimination tournament, with the following rules:

- Each tie was played on a home-and-away two-legged basis, with the higher-seeded team hosting the second leg.
- In the round of 16, quarterfinals, and semifinals, if tied on aggregate, the away goals rule would be used. If still tied, the penalty shoot-out would be used to determine the winner (no extra time would be played).
- In the finals, if tied on aggregate, the away goals rule would not be used, and 30 minutes of extra time would be played. If still tied after extra time, the penalty shoot-out would be used to determine the winner.
- If there were two semifinalists from the same association, they would have to play each other.

== Bracket ==
The bracket of the knockout stages was determined by the seeding as follows:

- Round of 16:
  - Match A: Seed 1 vs. Seed 16
  - Match B: Seed 2 vs. Seed 15
  - Match C: Seed 3 vs. Seed 14
  - Match D: Seed 4 vs. Seed 13
  - Match E: Seed 5 vs. Seed 12
  - Match F: Seed 6 vs. Seed 11
  - Match G: Seed 7 vs. Seed 10
  - Match H: Seed 8 vs. Seed 9
- Quarterfinals:
  - Match S1: Winner A vs. Winner H
  - Match S2: Winner B vs. Winner G
  - Match S3: Winner C vs. Winner F
  - Match S4: Winner D vs. Winner E
- Semifinals: (if there were two semifinalists from the same association, they would have to play each other)
  - Match F1: Winner S1 vs. Winner S4
  - Match F2: Winner S2 vs. Winner S3
- Finals: Winner F1 vs. Winner F2

Round of 16
16	(Argentina) River Plate	2	0	2
1	(Ecuador) LDU Quito	0	1	1
9	(Paraguay) Libertad	1	1	2 (3)
8	(Brazil) Chapecoense (p)	1	1	2 (5)
10	(Brazil) Sport Recife	1	0	1
7	(Argentina) Huracán	1	3	4
15	(Argentina) Lanús	0	0	0 (3)
2	(Uruguay) Defensor Sporting (p)	0	0	0 (5)
12	(Brazil) Atlético Paranaense	1	0	1
5	(Brazil) Brasília	0	0	0
13	(Colombia) Deportes Tolima	1	0	1
4	(Paraguay) Sportivo Luqueño	1	1	2
11	(Argentina) Independiente	1	0	1
6	(Paraguay) Olimpia	0	0	0
14	(Ecuador) Emelec	2	0	2
3	(Colombia) Santa Fe (a)	1	1	2

Quarterfinals
16	(Argentina) River Plate	3	1	4
8	(Brazil) Chapecoense	1	2	3
7	(Argentina) Huracán	1	0	1
2	(Uruguay) Defensor Sporting	0	0	0
12	(Brazil) Atlético Paranaense	1	0	1
4	(Paraguay) Sportivo Luqueño	0	2	2
11	(Argentina) Independiente	0	1	1
3	(Colombia) Santa Fe	1	1	2

Semifinals
16	(Argentina) River Plate	0	2	2
7	(Argentina) Huracán	1	2	3
4	(Paraguay) Sportivo Luqueño	1	0	1
3	(Colombia) Santa Fe (a)	1	0	1

Finals
7	(Argentina) Huracán	0	0	0 (1)
3	(Colombia) Santa Fe (p)	0	0	0 (3)

== Round of 16 ==
The first legs were played on September 22–24, and the second legs were played on September 29–30 and October 1, 2015.

Team 1	Agg.	Team 2	1st leg	2nd leg
River Plate (Argentina)	2–1	(Ecuador) LDU Quito	2–0	0–1
Lanús (Argentina)	0–0 (3–5 p)	(Uruguay) Defensor Sporting	0–0	0–0
Emelec (Ecuador)	2–2 (a)	(Colombia) Santa Fe	2–1	0–1
Deportes Tolima (Colombia)	1–2	(Paraguay) Sportivo Luqueño	1–1	0–1
Atlético Paranaense (Brazil)	1–0	(Brazil) Brasília	1–0	0–0
Independiente (Argentina)	1–0	(Paraguay) Olimpia	1–0	0–0
Sport Recife (Brazil)	1–4	(Argentina) Huracán	1–1	0–3
Libertad (Paraguay)	2–2 (3–5 p)	(Brazil) Chapecoense	1–1	1–1

=== Match A ===
September 23, 2015
19:00 UTC−3

River Plate (Argentina)	2–0	(Ecuador) LDU Quito
Alario 26'; Mora 75'	Report

Estadio Antonio Vespucio Liberti, Buenos Aires
Referee: Christian Ferreyra (Uruguay)

September 30, 2015
17:45 UTC−5

LDU Quito (Ecuador)	1–0	(Argentina) River Plate
Mina 53'	Report

Estadio de Liga Deportiva Universitaria, Quito
Referee: Wilmar Roldán (Colombia)

River Plate won 2–1 on aggregate and advanced to the quarterfinals (Match S1).

=== Match B ===
September 24, 2015
21:00 UTC−3

Lanús (Argentina)	0–0	(Uruguay) Defensor Sporting
	Report

Estadio Ciudad de Lanús, Lanús
Referee: José Argote (Venezuela)

October 1, 2015
21:00 UTC−3

Defensor Sporting (Uruguay)	0–0	(Argentina) Lanús
	Report
Penalties
Scotti (penalty scored); Rodríguez (penalty scored); Lozano (penalty scored); Cardaccio (penalty scored); Gómez (penalty scored)	5–3	(penalty missed) Aguirre; (penalty scored) Martínez; (penalty scored) Velázquez; (penalty scored) Leto

Estadio Luis Franzini, Montevideo
Referee: Enrique Osses (Chile)

Tied 0–0 on aggregate, Defensor Sporting won on penalties and advanced to the quarterfinals (Match S2).

=== Match C ===
September 23, 2015
17:00 UTC−5

Emelec (Ecuador)	2–1	(Colombia) Santa Fe
Bolaños 82', 88' (pen.)	Report	Roa 45'

Estadio Jocay, Manta
Referee: Ricardo Marques (Brazil)

September 29, 2015
19:00 UTC−5

Santa Fe (Colombia)	1–0	(Ecuador) Emelec
Morelo 45+1'	Report

Estadio El Campín, Bogotá
Referee: Darío Ubriaco (Uruguay)

Tied 2–2 on aggregate, Santa Fe won on away goals and advanced to the quarterfinals (Match S3).

=== Match D ===
September 22, 2015
19:00 UTC−5

Deportes Tolima (Colombia)	1–1	(Paraguay) Sportivo Luqueño
Estrada 15'	Report	Ortega 69'

Estadio Metropolitano de Techo, Bogotá
Referee: Germán Delfino (Argentina)

September 29, 2015
18:00 UTC−4

Sportivo Luqueño (Paraguay)	1–0	(Colombia) Deportes Tolima
Miño 76'	Report

Estadio Feliciano Cáceres, Luque
Referee: Julio Bascuñán (Chile)

Sportivo Luqueño won 2–1 on aggregate and advanced to the quarterfinals (Match S4).

=== Match E ===
September 23, 2015
22:00 UTC−3

Atlético Paranaense (Brazil)	1–0	(Brazil) Brasília
Hernández 62'	Report

Arena da Baixada, Curitiba
Referee: Gery Vargas (Bolivia)

September 30, 2015
22:00 UTC−3

Brasília (Brazil)	0–0	(Brazil) Atlético Paranaense
	Report

Estádio Nacional Mané Garrincha, Brasília
Referee: Silvio Trucco (Argentina)

Atlético Paranaense won 1–0 on aggregate and advanced to the quarterfinals (Match S4).

=== Match F ===
September 23, 2015
21:15 UTC−3

Independiente (Argentina)	1–0	(Paraguay) Olimpia
Trejo 42'	Report

Estadio Libertadores de América, Avellaneda
Referee: Héber Lopes (Brazil)

September 30, 2015
20:00 UTC−4

Olimpia (Paraguay)	0–0	(Argentina) Independiente
	Report

Estadio Defensores del Chaco, Asunción
Referee: Daniel Fedorczuk (Uruguay)

Independiente won 1–0 on aggregate and advanced to the quarterfinals (Match S3).

=== Match G ===
September 23, 2015
22:00 UTC−3

Sport Recife (Brazil)	1–1	(Argentina) Huracán
André 51'	Report	Bogado 74' (pen.)

Estádio Ilha do Retiro, Recife
Referee: Adrián Vélez (Colombia)

September 30, 2015
22:10 UTC−3

Huracán (Argentina)	3–0	(Brazil) Sport Recife
Ábila 47', 72'; Bogado 52'	Report

Estadio Tomás Adolfo Ducó, Buenos Aires
Referee: Julio Quintana (Paraguay)

Huracán won 4–1 on aggregate and advanced to the quarterfinals (Match S2).

=== Match H ===
September 24, 2015
20:00 UTC−4

Libertad (Paraguay)	1–1	(Brazil) Chapecoense
López 90+2'	Report	Camilo 17'

Estadio Dr. Nicolás Léoz, Asunción
Referee: Roberto Tobar (Chile)

October 1, 2015
21:00 UTC−3

Chapecoense (Brazil)	1–1	(Paraguay) Libertad
Túlio de Melo 7'	Report	Mencia 3'
Penalties
Bruno Rangel (penalty scored); Neto (penalty scored); Cléber Santana (penalty scored); Gil (penalty scored); Tiago Luís (penalty scored)	5–3	(penalty missed) López; (penalty scored) González; (penalty scored) Balbuena; (penalty scored) Aquino

Arena Condá, Chapecó
Referee: Diego Haro (Peru)

Tied 2–2 on aggregate, Chapecoense won on penalties and advanced to the quarterfinals (Match S1).

== Quarterfinals ==
The first legs were played on October 20–22, and the second legs were played on October 27–29, 2015.

Team 1	Agg.	Team 2	1st leg	2nd leg
River Plate (Argentina)	4–3	(Brazil) Chapecoense	3–1	1–2
Huracán (Argentina)	1–0	(Uruguay) Defensor Sporting	1–0	0–0
Independiente (Argentina)	1–2	(Colombia) Santa Fe	0–1	1–1
Atlético Paranaense (Brazil)	1–2	(Paraguay) Sportivo Luqueño	1–0	0–2

=== Match S1 ===
October 21, 2015
21:00 UTC−3

River Plate (Argentina)	3–1	(Brazil) Chapecoense
Sánchez 19', 85'; Pisculichi 62'	Report	Maranhão 36'

Estadio Antonio Vespucio Liberti, Buenos Aires
Referee: Jonhatan Fuentes (Uruguay)

October 28, 2015
22:00 UTC−2

Chapecoense (Brazil)	2–1	(Argentina) River Plate
Bruno Rangel 20', 52'	Report	Sánchez 45+1'

Arena Condá, Chapecó
Referee: Julio Bascuñán (Chile)

River Plate won 4–3 on aggregate and advanced to the semifinals (Match F2).

=== Match S2 ===
October 20, 2015
20:45 UTC−3

Huracán (Argentina)	1–0	(Uruguay) Defensor Sporting
Ábila 78'	Report

Estadio Tomás Adolfo Ducó, Buenos Aires
Referee: Anderson Daronco (Brazil)

October 27, 2015
20:45 UTC−3

Defensor Sporting (Uruguay)	0–0	(Argentina) Huracán
	Report

Estadio Luis Franzini, Montevideo
Referee: Roddy Zambrano (Ecuador)

Huracán won 1–0 on aggregate and advanced to the semifinals (Match F2).

=== Match S3 ===
October 22, 2015
20:45 UTC−3

Independiente (Argentina)	0–1	(Colombia) Santa Fe
	Report	Balanta 65'

Estadio Libertadores de América, Avellaneda
Referee: Wilton Sampaio (Brazil)

October 29, 2015
19:00 UTC−5

Santa Fe (Colombia)	1–1	(Argentina) Independiente
Meza 30'	Report	Zapata 90+1' (o.g.)

Estadio El Campín, Bogotá
Referee: José Argote (Venezuela)

Santa Fe won 2–1 on aggregate and advanced to the semifinals (Match F1).

=== Match S4 ===
October 21, 2015
20:00 UTC−2

Atlético Paranaense (Brazil)	1–0	(Paraguay) Sportivo Luqueño
Marcos Guilherme 63'	Report

Arena da Baixada, Curitiba
Referee: Víctor Carrillo (Peru)

October 28, 2015
19:00 UTC−3

Sportivo Luqueño (Paraguay)	2–0	(Brazil) Atlético Paranaense
Ortega 3'; Leguizamón 35'	Report

Estadio Feliciano Cáceres, Luque
Referee: Christian Ferreyra (Uruguay)

Sportivo Luqueño won 2–1 on aggregate and advanced to the semifinals (Match F1).

== Semifinals ==
Since there were two semifinalists from Argentina, they had to play each other instead of their original opponents as determined by the seeding.

The first legs were played on November 4–5, and the second legs were played on November 25–26, 2015.

Team 1	Agg.	Team 2	1st leg	2nd leg
Sportivo Luqueño (Paraguay)	1–1 (a)	(Colombia) Santa Fe	1–1	0–0
River Plate (Argentina)	2–3	(Argentina) Huracán	0–1	2–2

=== Match F1 ===
November 4, 2015
20:45 UTC−3

Sportivo Luqueño (Paraguay)	1–1	(Colombia) Santa Fe
Di Vanni 13'	Report	Perlaza 60'

Estadio Feliciano Cáceres, Luque
Referee: Darío Ubriaco (Uruguay)

November 25, 2015
19:00 UTC−5

Santa Fe (Colombia)	0–0	(Paraguay) Sportivo Luqueño
	Report

Estadio El Campín, Bogotá
Referee: Enrique Osses (Chile)

Tied 1–1 on aggregate, Santa Fe won on away goals and advanced to the finals.

=== Match F2 ===
November 5, 2015
20:45 UTC−3

River Plate (Argentina)	0–1	(Argentina) Huracán
	Report	Espinoza 14'

Estadio Antonio Vespucio Liberti, Buenos Aires
Referee: Andrés Cunha (Uruguay)

November 26, 2015
20:45 UTC−3

Huracán (Argentina)	2–2	(Argentina) River Plate
Toranzo 2'; Ábila 25'	Report	Mora 68', 81'

Estadio Tomás Adolfo Ducó, Buenos Aires
Referee: Sandro Ricci (Brazil)

Huracán won 3–2 on aggregate and advanced to the finals.

== Finals ==
The finals were played on a home-and-away two-legged basis, with the higher-seeded team hosting the second leg. If tied on aggregate, the away goals rule would not be used, and 30 minutes of extra time would be played. If still tied after extra time, the penalty shoot-out would be used to determine the winner.

The first leg was played on December 2, and the second leg was played on December 9, 2015.

December 2, 2015
21:00 UTC−3

Huracán (Argentina)	0–0	(Colombia) Santa Fe
	Report

Estadio Tomás Adolfo Ducó, Buenos Aires
Referee: Antonio Arias (Paraguay)

December 9, 2015
19:00 UTC−5

Santa Fe (Colombia)	0–0 (a.e.t.)	(Argentina) Huracán
	Report
Penalties
Pérez (penalty scored); Seijas (penalty scored); Balanta (penalty scored)	3–1	(penalty missed) Bogado; (penalty missed) Nervo; (penalty scored) Mancinelli; (penalty missed) Toranzo

Estadio El Campín, Bogotá
Referee: Héber Lopes (Brazil)

Tied 0–0 on aggregate, Santa Fe won on penalties.
