= Federico Alonso =

Federico Alonso may refer to:

- Federico Alonso (sailor) (born 1981), Argentine-born Spanish sailor
- Federico Alonso (footballer) (born 1991), Uruguayan footballer
