= Matías Succar =

Peruvian footballer (born 1999)

Personal information
- Full name: Juan Matías Succar Cañote
- Date of birth: 16 February 1999 (age 27)
- Place of birth: Lima, Peru
- Height: 1.84 m (6 ft 0 in)
- Position: Striker

Team information
- Current team: Cienciano (on loan from Alianza Lima)
- Number: 19

Youth career
- 2006–2010: Country Club Villa
- 2010–2013: Cantolao San Borja
- 2013–2015: Academia Cantolao
- 2016–2017: Deportivo Municipal

Senior career*
Years	Team	Apps	(Gls)
2017–2021	Deportivo Municipal	49	(14)
2018–2019	→ Unión Comercio (loan)	25	(5)
2021–2022	LASK	0	(0)
2021	→ Juniors OÖ (loan)	11	(1)
2021	→ Teplice (loan)	11	(1)
2022–2024	Carlos A. Mannucci	66	(18)
2024–	Alianza Lima	29	(0)
2026–	→ Cienciano (loan)	21	(5)

International career^{‡}
2022	Peru U23	1	(0)
2025–	Peru	1	(0)
- * Club domestic league appearances and goals as of 14 August 2026 ‡ National team caps and goals as of 21 December 2025

Juan Matías Succar Cañote (born 16 February 1999) is a Peruvian professional footballer who plays as a striker for Peruvian club Cienciano, on loan from Alianza Lima, and the Peru national team.

== Club career ==
=== Youth career ===
Succar started as a goalkeeper in 2006 at Country Club Villa, in the Chorrillos District of his hometown Lima, Peru. He then moved to changed position to left-back, and then a left midfielder, before joining Cantolao San Borja. Aged 14, he moved to Academia Cantolao where he became a striker. He didn't play much, and left football for one year. Succar returned to play when he was 16 year old and scored 26 goals in his first season.

=== Deportivo Municipal ===
In 2016, 17-year old Succar joined Deportivo Municipal, where he began playing for the clubs reserve team.

At the age of 18, Succar was promoted to the first team squad. He made his senior debut on 28 October 2017, in a Peruvian Primera División game against Universidad de San Martín, where his older brother Alexander was in the starting lineup for the opponents. Matías Succar started on the bench, but replaced Rodrigo Cuba after 68 minutes, the same minute his brother was subbed off. The game was his first and last of season. The following season, Succar played six games.

==== Loan to Unión Comercio ====
In the search of more continuity, Succar was loaned out to Unión Comercio for the 2018 season. The deal was later extended until the summer 2019. He then returned to Municipal after 25 games and five goals for Comercio.

==== Return to Deportivo Municipal ====
After returning to Municipal, Succar found more continuity, scoring three important goals in 16 games, to help save Municipal from relegation. From the 2020 season, he became a regular starter and scored five goals in his first 10 league games.

=== LASK ===
On 12 January 2021, Succar moved to Austrian Football Bundesliga club LASK on a deal until June 2024.

==== Loans to Juniors OÖ and Teplice ====
Succar made his debut for LASK's reserve team, Juniors OÖ, in the Second League, as a 78th-minute substitute against Horn.

On 7 September 2021, he joined Teplice in the Czech Republic on loan for the 2021–22 season.

=== Carlos A. Mannucci ===
On 5 July 2022, he signed for Peruvian club Carlos A. Mannucci.

=== Alianza Lima ===
In July 2024, Matías Succar joined Alianza Lima on a contract until the end of 2027.

==== Loan to Cienciano ====
Succar joined Cienciano on a one-year loan running through the 2026 season.

== International career ==
Born in Peru, Succar is of Lebanese descent and was eligible to be selected for the Peru national team and the Lebanon national team. He was also available to represent the United States due to his father's American nationality.

In September 2019, Matías and his older brother, Alexander, were contacted by the Lebanese Football Association to play for Lebanon in the 2022 FIFA World Cup qualification. However, they refused the call-up. In June 2020, Succar revealed his intentions to fight for a place on the Peruvian national team.

At the end of August 2020, Succar was on the list of those summoned to the training sessions of the Peru national team. Previously, had been part of a few training sessions for the under-18 and under-20 teams. Succar made his senior debut for Peru on 21 December 2025, in a 2–0 friendly win over Bolivia.

== Personal life ==
Succar's paternal great grandparents immigrated to Peru from Lebanon by boat. They were originally from Bsharri, Lebanon. Matías's older brother, Alexander, is also a professional footballer.

== Career statistics ==
=== Club ===
As of match played 16 October 2025

Appearances and goals by club, season and competition
Club	Season	League			Cup		Continental		Total	
Club	Season	Division	Apps	Goals	Apps	Goals	Apps	Goals	Apps	Goals
Deportivo Municipal	2017	Torneo Descentralizado	1	0	—		0	0	1	0
Deportivo Municipal	2018	Torneo Descentralizado	6	0	—		0	0	6	0
Deportivo Municipal	2019	Liga 1	16	3	2	0	0	0	18	3
Deportivo Municipal	2020	Liga 1	26	11	—		0	0	26	11
Deportivo Municipal	Total		49	14	2	0	0	0	51	14
Unión Comercio (loan)	2018	Torneo Descentralizado	11	3	—		0	0	11	3
Unión Comercio (loan)	2019	Liga 1	14	2	—		0	0	14	2
Unión Comercio (loan)	Total		25	5	0	0	0	0	25	5
LASK	2020–21	Austrian Bundesliga	—		0	0	1	0	1	0
Juniors OÖ (loan)	2020–21	Austrian Second League	11	1	0	0	0	0	11	1
Teplice (loan)	2021–22	Czech First League	11	1	2	0	0	0	13	1
Carlos A. Mannucci	2022	Liga 1	17	3	—		0	0	17	3
Carlos A. Mannucci	2023	Liga 1	33	11	—		0	0	33	11
Carlos A. Mannucci	2024	Liga 1	16	4	—		0	0	16	4
Carlos A. Mannucci	Total		66	18	0	0	0	0	66	18
Alianza Lima	2024	Liga 1	11	0	—		0	0	11	0
Alianza Lima	2025	Liga 1	18	0	—		3	0	21	0
Alianza Lima	Total		29	0	0	0	3	0	32	0
Career total			206	39	4	0	4	0	214	39
