= Piero Guzmán =

Peruvian footballer (born 2000)

Personal information
- Full name: Piero Estefano Guzmán Simbala
- Date of birth: 21 January 2000 (age 26)
- Place of birth: Piura, Perú
- Height: 1.93 m (6 ft 4 in)
- Position: Central defender

Team information
- Current team: Universitario de Deportes
- Number: 30

Youth career
- –2020: Universitario de Deportes

Senior career*
Years	Team	Apps	(Gls)
2021–	Universitario de Deportes	25	(2)
2021	→ Pirata FC (loan)	9	(0)
2024	→ Cusco FC (loan)	12	(1)
2025–	→ Alianza Atlético (loan)	20	(0)
- * Club domestic league appearances and goals as of 30 December 2025

Piero Estefano Guzmán Simbala (born 21 January 2000) is a Peruvian footballer who plays as a central defender for Peruvian Liga 1 club Alianza Atlético on loan from Universitario de Deportes.

== Club career ==
Guzmán played in the youth ranks of Universitario de Deportes. In 2019, he was promoted to Universitario's reserve team. In November 2020, after beginning to train with the first team, he signed his first professional contract with the club. Following this, manager Ángel Comizzo registered Guzmán in the first team squad for the 2021 season. He did not play a single match in the year, appearing only once in the bench, on matchday 9 against Carlos A. Mannucci.

Looking for more playing time, Guzmán was loaned to Pirata FC until the end of the season. He made his professional debut in his spell with Pirata and played the entirety of the Fase 2 of the Liga 2. The club, on the other hand, had a bad campaign, finishing last in the aggregate table; however, at the beginning of the season it was determined that no team would be relegated and Pirata stayed in the Liga 2.

Guzmán returned to Universitario for the 2022 season, being registered for both the Liga 1 and the Copa Libertadores. He played his first game with Universitario on matchday 6, scoring in a 1–1 tie against Cienciano. The following year, Guzmán won his first trophy as Universitario defeated Alianza Lima in the 2023 Liga 1 finals.

In June 2024, he was loaned to Cusco FC for the rest of the season, where he scored 1 goal in 12 matches. Despite playing at a good level in Cusco, he was loaned again for the 2025 season, this time to Alianza Atlético.

== Career statistics ==
As of 31 December 2021

Appearances and goals by club, season and competition
Club	Season	League			Cup		Continental		Other		Total	
Club	Season	Division	Apps	Goals	Apps	Goals	Apps	Goals	Apps	Goals	Apps	Goals
Universitario de Deportes	2021	Peruvian Liga 1	0	0	0	0	0	0	0	0	0	0
Pirata FC	2021	Peruvian Liga 2	9	0	0	0	—		0	0	9	0
Career total			9	0	0	0	0	0	0	0	9	0

== Honours ==
=== Club ===
Universitario de Deportes

- Peruvian Primera División: 2023
- Torneo Apertura: 2024
