= Jairo Concha =

Peruvian footballer (born 1999)

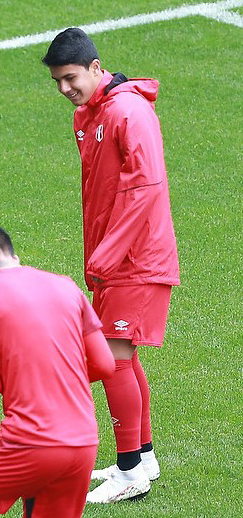
- Concha in June 2018

Personal information
- Full name: Jairo Jair Concha Gonzáles
- Date of birth: 27 May 1999 (age 27)
- Place of birth: Chorrillos, Peru
- Height: 1.74 m (5 ft 9 in)
- Position: Attacking midfielder

Team information
- Current team: Universitario de Deportes
- Number: 17

Youth career
- 2007–2011: Academia de Fútbol Julinho
- 2012–2017: Universidad San Martín

Senior career*
Years	Team	Apps	(Gls)
2017–2019	Universidad San Martín	59	(1)
2020–2023	Alianza Lima	94	(12)
2020	→ Universidad San Martín (loan)	27	(3)
2024–	Universitario de Deportes	107	(14)

International career^{‡}
2017	Peru U18		
2018–2019	Peru U20	13	(3)
2020–	Peru U23	4	(0)
2022–	Peru	13	(0)
- * Club domestic league appearances and goals as of 19 September 2026 ‡ National team caps and goals as of 3 October 2026

Jairo Jair Concha Gonzáles (born 27 May 1999) is a Peruvian footballer who plays as a midfielder for Peruvian Liga 1 club Universitario de Deportes and the Peru national team.

== Club career ==
=== Early years ===
Concha grew up in Huaylas in the Chorrillos District of Lima. He joined the football academy Academia de Fútbol Julinho in Peru at the age of 8.

=== Universidad San Martín ===
At age 11, he attended a training camp arranged by Universidad San Martín in Chorrillos, where they chose approximately 60 boys to be part of the club. Of these, only 30 were kept on, and from there Concha joined San Martín, a club to which he belonged since 2012. He joined the reserve team in 2016 and ended up joining the first team in that same year, thanks to coach José del Solar. On 23 February 2017, under manager Orlando Lavalle, Concha had his official debut for San Martín against Sport Rosario in the Peruvian Torneo Descentralizado. He started on the bench, but came in for the last five minutes, replacing Ramiro Cáseres. He made a total of 5 appearances in that season. In 2018, Concha played more regularly, became one of the revelation players of that season of Peruvian football and, on August 25, he also scored his first goal as a professional in a 3–2 defeat against FBC Melgar. He became a starting player and, following a season with 37 league appearances, San Martín decided to retain him ahead of the 2019 season, although there was some interest in the now 19-year old midfielder, followed by several important clubs from Peru and Mexico. In addition, Concha also won the award for Newcomer of the Year in the 2018 Torneo Descentralizado.

The following season, however, he saw little action due to various injuries, including one to the fifth metatarsal bone that kept him off the playing field for three and a half months. In that 2019 campaign, Concha only played 17 games.

=== Alianza Lima ===
In early 2020, San Martín once again refused to sell him, despite big interest from Alianza Lima. However, one month later, it was confirmed that Alianza had bought him free, but he would remain at San Martín on loan until the end of the season, with the intention of him continuing to play as a starter. In June 2020, Alianza wanted to recall Concha, but San Martín refused to let him go until the previously agreed end of the loan deal. He finally joined Alianza in early 2021, making his debut in March in a 2–2 home draw against Cusco FC, wearing the shirt number 17. Concha began playing regularly and finished the year winning the national title with Alianza after defeating Sporting Cristal 1–0 on aggregate in the finals. This was followed in 2022 by another national title, after defeating FBC Melgar 2–1 on aggregate in the finals. The next season, after the retirement of Jefferson Farfán, Concha was given the shirt #10. That year, the team won the Torneo Apertura but lost the playoff finals against Universitario de Deportes 1-3 on aggregate.

=== Universitario de Deportes ===
Following the 2023 season, he decided to not extend his contract with Alianza Lima and was signed by Universitario.

== International career ==
Concha has represented Peru in the U18, U20 and U23 categories. In March 2018, Concha was one of the youth players called as reinforcements for the training of the senior team, at the disposal of coach Ricardo Gareca, ahead of two friendlies against Croatia and Iceland, prior to Peruvian participation in the 2018 FIFA World Cup. On 12 January 2019, he was included in the roster of 23 players for the 2019 South American U-20 Championship. He played all four matches during the group stage, however Peru did not advance to the next stage. On 27 November 2019, he was called to the U-23 team for participation in the 2020 CONMEBOL Pre-Olympic Tournament, where Concha played in all the games.

== Career statistics ==
=== International ===
As of match played 3 October 2026

Appearances and goals by national team and year
National team	Year	Apps	Goals
Peru	2022	2	0
Peru	2025	4	0
Peru	2026	7	0
Total		13	0

== Honours ==
Universitario de Deportes

- Peruvian Primera División: 2024
- Peruvian Primera División: 2025

Alianza Lima

- Peruvian Primera División: 2021
- Peruvian Primera División: 2022
