= Alexander Succar =

Peruvian footballer (born 1995)

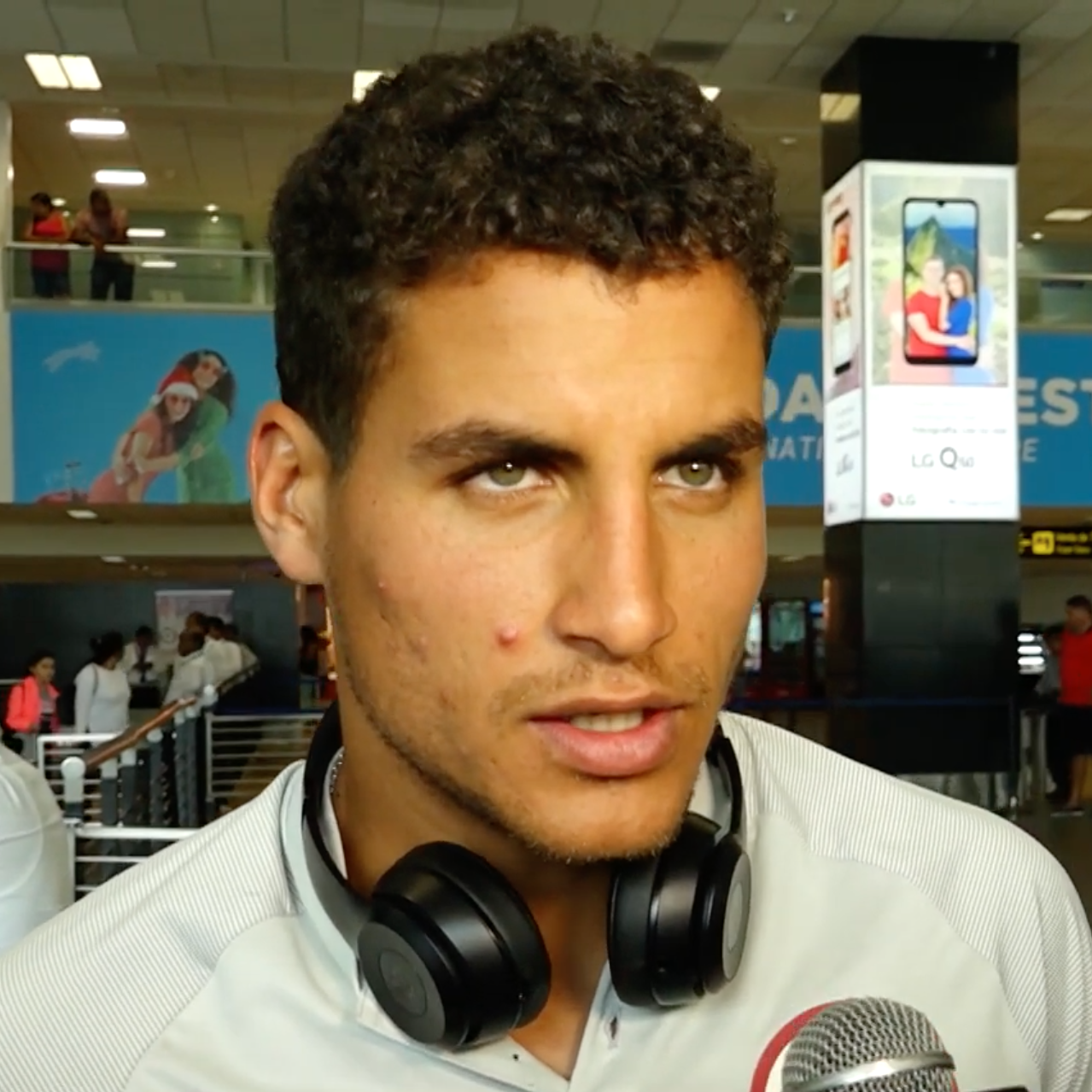
- Succar in 2020

Personal information
- Full name: Alexander Nasim Succar Cañote
- Date of birth: 12 August 1995 (age 31)
- Place of birth: Lima, Peru
- Height: 1.80 m (5 ft 11 in)
- Position: Striker

Youth career
- 2006–2013: Academia Cantolao

Senior career*
| Years | Team | Apps | (Gls) |
| 2014–2019 | Sporting Cristal | 26 | (2) |
| 2015 | → Cienciano (loan) | 15 | (3) |
| 2016–2017 | → USMP (loan) | 47 | (21) |
| 2018 | → Sion (loan) | 6 | (1) |
| 2019 | → Huachipato (loan) | 12 | (1) |
| 2020–2024 | Universitario de Deportes | 70 | (10) |
| 2024 | → Carlos A. Mannucci (loan) | 23 | (3) |
| 2025–2026 | Universidad César Vallejo | 22 | (2) |
| 2026 | UTC | 0 | (0) |
| 2026 | Nejmeh | 1 | (0) |

International career^{‡}
| 2015 | Peru U20 | 8 | (4) |
| 2017–2022 | Peru | 3 | (0) |
- * Club domestic league appearances and goals as of 02:08, 21 January 2026 (UTC) ‡ National team caps and goals as of 16 November 2022

Alexander Nasim Succar Cañote (born 12 August 1995) is a Peruvian professional footballer who plays as a striker.

== Club career ==
Succar played in the youth ranks of Academia Cantolao. In January 2014, he was signed by Sporting Cristal. During the 2015 Apertura phase, due to an excess of forwards in the squad, he was loaned to Cienciano, where he scored 3 goals. Succar then returned to Cristal, where he played the Clausura and the Playoffs phases, ultimately losing in the final against F.B.C. Melgar.

He played the Apertura phase of the 2016 season with Cristal and was loaned to Universidad San Martín for the Clausura, where he kept a good performance under manager José del Solar. At the end of the season, Succar's loan was extended for another year with the objective of gaining more playing time. He scored a total of 21 goals during his time with San Martín.

In January 2025, Succar joined Universidad César Vallejo in the Peruvian Segunda División.

On 6 January 2026, Succar joined UTC. Two weeks later, on 20 January, Succar joined Nejmeh in the Lebanese Premier League as a deadline-day transfer.

== International career ==
Born in Peru, Succar is of Lebanese descent and is eligible to be selected for the Peru national team and the Lebanon national team. He's also available to represent the United States due to his father's American nationality.

=== Peru ===
Succar made his international debut for Peru on 6 June 2017, in a friendly game against Paraguay, winning 1–0.

=== Lebanon ===
In September 2019, Alexander and his brother Matías were contacted by the Lebanese Football Association to play for Lebanon in the 2022 FIFA World Cup qualification due to their Lebanese descent. However, they refused the call-up.

On 7 September 2023, Succar acquired Lebanese citizenship in order to play for the Lebanon national team. Despite having been called up to play for Lebanon in a friendly against the United Arab Emirates on 17 October 2023, Succar's club Universitario de Deportes refused to release the player due to safety concerns regarding the Gaza war in the region.

== Personal life ==
Succar's paternal great grandparents immigrated to Peru from Lebanon by boat. They were originally from Bsharri, Lebanon. Alexander's younger brother, Matías, is also a professional footballer.

== Honours ==
Sporting Cristal

- Primera División: 2014, 2016

Universitario de Deportes

- Primera División: 2023
- Torneo Apertura: 2020
