= Joao Villamarín =

Association football player

Personal information
- Full name: Joao de Jesús Villamarín Antúnez
- Date of birth: 10 February 1992 (age 34)
- Place of birth: Pisco, Peru
- Height: 1.76 m (5 ft 9 in)
- Position: Forward

Team information
- Current team: Dos de Mayo

Senior career*
Years	Team	Apps	(Gls)
2012	Alianza Lima	1	(0)
2013	Sport Áncash	15	(6)
2013–2015	Unión Comercio	34	(4)
2016	Real Garcilaso	29	(8)
2017	UTC Cajamarca	42	(7)
2018	Melgar	26	(5)
2019	Carlos Mannucci	20	(3)
2020	Ayacucho	27	(3)
2021	Sport Boys	22	(11)
2022	Universitario	8	(1)
2022	Atlético Grau	16	(5)
2023	Carlos Mannucci	12	(1)
2024	Sport Boys	18	(1)
2025	Ayacucho	15	(1)
2025	UCV	7	(1)
2026	Sport River		
2026–	Dos de Mayo		
- * Club domestic league appearances and goals as of 02:46, 20 March 2026 (UTC)

Joao de Jesús Villamarín Antúnez (born 10 February 1992) is a Peruvian footballer who plays as a forward for Tradición Copera club Dos de Mayo.

A journeyman, he made 268 appearances and scored 49 goals in the Peruvian Primera División. He represented ten teams in the league, starting with Alianza Lima, and won the Clausura in 2018 and 2020 for Melgar and Ayacucho, respectively.

== Career ==
Born in Pisco, Villamarín was raised in Lima where he came through the youth teams of Alianza Lima. He played once for the first team on 18 February 2012 on the opening day of the Peruvian Primera División season; he came on as a 68th-minute substitute for Mauricio Mori a 2–2 home draw with León de Huánuco with both teams fielding youth players due to a players' strike.

Villamarín played for Sport Áncash in the Peruvian Segunda División in 2013 and for top-flight Unión Comercio before joining Real Garcilaso for 2016. He ended his only season with the team from Cusco with 8 goals from 29 games (13 starts), earning attention from Alianza. He was also considered for a Peru national team game away to Bolivia, as manager Ricardo Gareca wanted players who would be accustomed to altitude.

For 2017, Villamarín moved to UTC Cajamarca. After contributing 7 goals, he moved on a two-year deal to Melgar. He won the 2018 Clausura tournament with the club from Arequipa.

Villamarín signed for newly promoted Carlos A. Mannucci in January 2019. In July that year he scored against UTC and his celebration was interpreted by fans of Universitario – Alianza's rivals – as an insult. The fans had perceived that he had posed in front of a television camera making a gesture of an inverted U; after receiving death threats, he said that it was an "M" for his son, Mateo.

For 2020, Villamarín joined Ayacucho. He was again a Clausura champion, scoring his attempt in the penalty shootout at the end of the final against Sporting Cristal on 5 December.

In January 2021, Villamarín signed for Sport Boys. He recorded his best goalscoring figures during his season in Callao, with 11 in 22 games, putting him joint third in the entire league.

Villamarín joined Universitario at the start of 2022. He scored on his debut for Las Cremas on 6 February in a 3–0 win at Academia Cantolao, but added no more goals before transferring to Atlético Grau in June. He played 16 games, scored 5 goals and was sent off once in what remained of the season as the club missed out on a Copa Sudamericana place two points behind Deportivo Binacional, before leaving in December.

Villamarín signed for a second spell at Carlos Mannucci in 2023. Having scored once in 12 games – all from the bench – for the team from Trujillo, he joined another former employer for the following year, namely Sport Boys. He scored once in 18 games, in a 2–0 home win over Cienciano on 30 July 2024.

At the start of 2025, Villamarín returned to Ayacucho. He scored once in 15 appearances, in a 2–1 loss away to Sport Boys on 22 February; his goal was given by the video assistant referee despite teammate Jiries Salem handling the ball beforehand. In July, he dropped into the second division to join UCV. In February 2026, he signed for Sport River in the Copa Perú, and in October he joined Dos de Mayo in the new fourth-tier Tradición Copera.

== Personal life ==
Villamarín is the cousin of fellow footballer Roberto Villamarín. They were teammates at UTC, Ayacucho, Universitario and Carlos Mannucci.

== Honours ==
Melgar

- Peruvian Primera División: 2018 (Clausura)

Ayacucho

- Peruvian Primera División: 2020 (Clausura)
