= Ángel Cayetano =

Uruguayan footballer

Personal information
- Full name: Ángel Gabriel Cayetano Pírez
- Date of birth: 8 January 1991 (age 35)
- Place of birth: Melo, Uruguay
- Height: 1.99 m (6 ft 6 in)
- Positions: Centre-back; defensive midfielder

Team information
- Current team: Magallanes
- Number: 18

Youth career
- Danubio

Senior career*
Years	Team	Apps	(Gls)
2011–2014	Danubio	30	(1)
2014	→ Racing Montevideo (loan)	12	(0)
2014	Cerro Largo	13	(2)
2015–2018	Racing Montevideo	73	(1)
2016	→ Real Garcilaso (loan)	11	(0)
2019	Tampico Madero	5	(0)
2020–2021	Cerro Largo	56	(0)
2022	Universitario	16	(1)
2022–2023	Deportivo Maldonado	38	(1)
2024–	Magallanes	7	(0)

International career
2011	Uruguay U20	11	(0)
- * Club domestic league appearances and goals as of 17 April 2024

Ángel Gabriel Cayetano Pírez (born 8 January 1991) is a Uruguayan footballer who plays as a centre-back for Chilean Primera B club Magallanes.

== Club career ==
Born in Melo, Uruguay, Cayetano came from the youth ranks of Danubio, being promoted to the first team in 2011 and making his debut in March of the same year, under manager Eduardo Acevedo, in a 3–2 home victory against Liverpool de Montevideo. He played in the 2012 Copa Sudamericana, being expelled in a match against Olimpia, and was phased out of the starting XI after the arrival of manager Leonardo Ramos.

In 2014, he had a stint on loan with Racing Club de Montevideo, under manager Mauricio Larriera. After a brief stint with Cerro Largo, he returned to Racing Club in 2015 until 2018, with a stint on loan with Peruvian club Real Garcilaso in 2016. In 2019, he emigrated to Mexico and played for Tampico Madero in the second level. Back to Uruguay, he rejoined Cerro Largo.

In 2022, he moved to Peru and joined Universitario in the top level. In the second half of 2022, he returned to his homeland and joined Deportivo Maldonado. In 2024, he moved abroad again and signed with Magallanes in the Primera B de Chile.

== International career ==
Cayetano represented Uruguay at under-20 level in both the 2011 South American Championship and the 2011 FIFA World Cup.
