= Kaio Magno =

Brazilian footballer (born 1999)

Personal information
- Full name: Kaio Magno Bacelar Martins
- Date of birth: 13 August 1999 (age 27)
- Place of birth: Barra Mansa, Brazil
- Height: 1.88 m (6 ft 2 in)
- Position: Striker

Youth career
- –2020: Vasco da Gama
- 2018–2019: → Ceará (youth loan)

Senior career*
Years	Team	Apps	(Gls)
2020–2022	Vasco da Gama	2	(0)
2021	→ Botafogo-SP (loan)	3	(0)
2022	→ Madureira (loan)	1	(0)
- * Club domestic league appearances and goals as of 16:05, 5 March 2020 (UTC)

Kaio Magno Bacelar Martins (born 13 August 1999), commonly known as Kaio Magno, is a Brazilian professional footballer who plays as a striker.

== Career statistics ==
=== Club ===
As of 5 March 2020.

Club	Season	League			State league		Cup		Continental		Other		Total	
Club	Season	Division	Apps	Goals	Apps	Goals	Apps	Goals	Apps	Goals	Apps	Goals	Apps	Goals
Vasco da Gama	2020	Série A	0	0	1 (Note: Appearances in the Campeonato Carioca)	0	0	0	0	0	0	0	1	0
Career total			0	0	1	0	0	0	0	0	0	0	1	0
