= Renato Espinosa =

Peruvian footballer (born 1998)

Personal information
- Full name: Renato Espinosa Torres
- Date of birth: 6 July 1998 (age 28)
- Place of birth: Lima, Peru
- Height: 1.85 m (6 ft 1 in)
- Position: Forward

Team information
- Current team: Corvinul Hunedoara
- Number: 9

Youth career
- –2016: Sporting Cristal
- 2017–2018: Sporting Cristal

Senior career*
Years	Team	Apps	(Gls)
2017	Ayacucho	0	(0)
2017–2020	Sporting Cristal	2	(0)
2019	→ Universidad de San Martín (loan)	23	(4)
2020	→ UTC Cajamarca (loan)	22	(3)
2021	Alianza Universidad	23	(5)
2022	Deportivo Municipal	32	(6)
2023	Cantolao	32	(1)
2024	Sport Huancayo	7	(0)
2024–2025	Alianza Atlético	34	(10)
2025–2026	Unirea Slobozia	21	(9)
2026–	Corvinul Hunedoara	14	(1)
- * Club domestic league appearances and goals as of 7 November 2026

Renato Espinosa Torres (born 6 July 1998) is a Peruvian professional footballer who plays as a forward for Liga I club Corvinul Hunedoara.

== Club career ==
=== Ayacucho ===
In January 2017, Espinosa refused to sign a three-year professional contract with Sporting Cristal because the parties couldn't agree, and instead joined Ayacucho FC on a free agent, alongside three other former teammates from Sporting Cristal. Espinosa had been contacted by Francisco Melgar from Cristal's management, who Espinosa previously worked under at Cristal, and signed a deal for the whole 2017 season, after having played in three preseason friendly matches for Ayacucho.

However, Espinosa was never able to make his professional debut for the club.

=== Return to Sporting Cristal ===
In the summer 2017, only six months after his departure from Cristal, Espinosa officially returned to Sporting Cristal. He made his professional debut for Cristal in the following season, on 1 March 2018, against his former club Ayacucho FC in the Peruvian Primera División. Espinosa started on the bench, before he came on as a substitute for Josepmir Ballón in the 81st minute.

After only playing 14 minutes during the 2018 season in the Peruvian Primera División, Espinosa was loaned out to Universidad de San Martín for the 2019 season. Espinosa played 23 games and scored four goals.

Espinosa was loaned out again for the 2020 season, this time to UTC Cajamarca.

=== Later clubs ===
On 3 December 2020 it was confirmed, that Espinosa had signed with Alianza Universidad for the 2021 season. He got his debut on 15 March 2021 against Cusco FC. Espinosa made a total of 23 appearances for the club, scoring five goal. On 3 December 2021, Espinosa signed with Deportivo Municipal for the 2022 season.

=== Cantolao ===
On 8 December 2022, Academia Cantolao confirmed the signing of Espinosa. In January 2024, Espinosa moved to Peruvian Primera División side Sport Huancayo. On June 6, 2024, Espinosa signed with Alianza Atlético.

== Honours ==
Sporting Cristal

- Peruvian Primera División: 2018
