= Newton Williams (footballer) =

Panamanian football player (born 2001)

Personal information
- Full name: Newton Aubrey Williams Richards
- Date of birth: 2 January 2001 (age 25)
- Place of birth: Bocas Town, Panama
- Height: 1.91 m (6 ft 3 in)
- Position: Forward

Team information
- Current team: Deportivo Saprissa
- Number: 23

Senior career*
Years	Team	Apps	(Gls)
2018–2022	Costa del Este	20	(4)
2020	→ Spartaks Jūrmala (loan)	11	(1)
2021	→ Palmeiras (loan)	4	(1)
2022	→ 9 de Octubre (loan)	10	(0)
2023	San Miguelito	9	(1)
2023–	Antigua	29	(4)
2024–	→ Hapoel Ra'anana (loan)	29	(10)
- * Club domestic league appearances and goals as of 23 April 2025

Newton Aubrey Williams Richards (born 2 January 2001) is a Panamanian professional footballer who plays as a forward for Liga Leumit club Hapoel Ra'anana, on loan from Liga Nacional club Antigua.

== Career ==
At the age of 16, Williams trialed for the youth academy of Brazilian side Grêmio.

He started his career with Panamanian second division side Costa del Este.

Before the 2020 season, Williams signed for Spartaks Jūrmala in Latvia.

Before the 2021 season, he signed for Palmeiras.
