= José Zevallos =

Peruvian footballer (born 1999)

Personal information
- Full name: José Fernando Zevallos Villanueva
- Date of birth: 13 January 1999 (age 27)
- Place of birth: Ica, Peru
- Height: 1.75 m (5 ft 9 in)
- Position: Left-back

Team information
- Current team: Cusco FC
- Number: 21

Youth career
- 2013–2017: Universitario de Deportes

Senior career*
Years	Team	Apps	(Gls)
2018–2022	Universitario de Deportes	38	(1)
2023	Ayacucho FC	23	(2)
2024–	Cusco FC	58	(0)

International career
2019	Peru U20	0	(0)
- * Club domestic league appearances and goals as of 1 December 2025

José Fernando Zevallos Villanueva (born 13 January 1999) is a Peruvian footballer who plays as a left-back for Peruvian Liga 1 club Cusco FC.

== Club career ==
Zevallos came from the youth ranks of Universitario de Deportes, arriving from his natal Ica to Lima at 14 years of age to live at Estadio Lolo Fernández. In 2017, he was observed by manager Pedro Troglio while playing in the Torneo de Promoción y Reserva and was invited to train with the first team. In 2018, manager Nicolás Córdova promoted Zevallos to the first team, after which he made his professional debut in an away match against Sport Huancayo and played a total of six games in the season. In 2019, he played in four matches and had his contract renewed until the end of 2022. In 2020, Zevallos played six games, being usually in the bench. He played more regularly in 2021, in a total of 13 matches between the league and the Copa Libertadores, but without standing out. In 2022, he scored his first goal as a professional in a home game against Sporting Cristal.

== International career ==
Zevallos has played for Peru at the U20 level, being called for the 2019 South American U-20 Championship.
