= Gerson Barreto =

Peruvian footballer (born 1995)

Personal information
- Full name: Gerson Alexis Barreto Gamboa
- Date of birth: 18 August 1995 (age 31)
- Place of birth: Lima, Peru
- Height: 1.79 m (5 ft 10 in)
- Position: Midfielder

Team information
- Current team: Asociación Deportiva Tarma
- Number: 88

Youth career
- –2013: Universitario

Senior career*
| Years | Team | Apps | (Gls) |
| 2013–2016 | Universitario | 1 | (0) |
| 2016–2019 | Academia Deportiva Cantolao | 88 | (1) |
| 2019–2022 | Universitario | 84 | (2) |
| 2023 | Cusco FC | 33 | (1) |
| 2024 | Club Deportivo Universidad César Vallejo | 29 | (0) |
| 2025 | Ayacucho FC | 0 | (0) |
| 2025- | Asociación Deportiva Tarma | 29 | (0) |
- * Club domestic league appearances and goals as of 30 December 2025

Gerson Alexis Barreto Gamboa (born 18 August 1995) is a Peruvian professional footballer who plays as a midfielder for Primera División club Asociación Deportiva Tarma.

== Career ==
Born in Lima, Barreto played youth football for Universitario before making his senior debut in 2013.

Having played for Universitario and Academia Deportiva Cantolao, Barreto returned to Universitario in July 2019. He signed a two-year extension to his contract at Universitario in January 2021.

== Honours ==
=== Club ===
Universitario

- Peruvian Primera División: 2013
- Torneo Apertura 2020

Academia Deportiva Cantolao

- Peruvian Segunda División: 2016
