= José Leguizamón =

Paraguayan footballer (born 1991)

Personal information
- Full name: José Ramón Leguizamón Ortega
- Date of birth: 21 August 1991 (age 35)
- Place of birth: Areguá, Paraguay
- Height: 1.78 m (5 ft 10 in)
- Position: Centre-back

Team information
- Current team: Sportivo Luqueño
- Number: 4

Youth career
- Sportivo Luqueño

Senior career*
Years	Team	Apps	(Gls)
2013–2015	Sportivo Luqueño	104	(13)
2016–2017	Olimpia	98	(4)
2017–2019	Rosario Central	22	(1)
2018–2019	→ Olimpia (loan)	55	(2)
2019–2021	Olimpia	34	(1)
2020–2021	→ Unión Española (loan)	11	(0)
2021	→ Sol de América (loan)	11	(0)
2022	Central Córdoba SdE	3	(0)
2022	Sol de América	15	(0)
2023	Cienciano	12	(0)
2023–	Sportivo Luqueño	24	(1)
- * Club domestic league appearances and goals as of 19:45, 8 September 2022 (UTC)

José Ramón Leguizamón Ortega (born 21 August 1991) is a Paraguayan footballer who plays as a centre-back for Sportivo Luqueño.

== Honours ==
Olimpia

- Paraguayan Primera División: 2018 Apertura, 2018 Clausura, 2019 Apertura, 2019 Clausura
