= Roberto Villamarín =

Peruvian footballer (born 1997)

Personal information
- Full name: Roberto Daniel Villamarín Mora
- Date of birth: 25 September 1997 (age 29)
- Place of birth: Pisco, Peru
- Height: 1.76 m (5 ft 9 in)
- Position: Right back

Team information
- Current team: UTC Cajamarca
- Number: 16

Youth career
- Alianza Lima
- UTC Cajamarca

Senior career*
| Years | Team | Apps | (Gls) |
| 2016–2017 | UTC Cajamarca | 44 | (3) |
| 2018–2019 | Atlas | 0 | (0) |
| 2018 | → Alianza Lima (loan) | 15 | (1) |
| 2019 | → Carlos A. Mannucci (loan) | 8 | (2) |
| 2020–2021 | Ayacucho | 48 | (6) |
| 2022 | Club Universitario de Deportes | 7 | (0) |
| 2022 | Carlos A. Mannucci | 17 | (0) |
| 2023 | Deportivo Binacional | 19 | (2) |
| 2024 | Unión Comercio | 14 | (0) |
| 2025– | UTC Cajamarca | 28 | (1) |

International career^{‡}
| 2022– | Peru | 1 | (0) |
- * Club domestic league appearances and goals as of 30 December 2025 ‡ National team caps and goals as of 16:16, 23 March 2024 (UTC)

Roberto Daniel Villamarín Mora (born 25 September 1997) is a Peruvian footballer who plays as a right back for UTC Cajamarca.
