= Federico Alonso (footballer) =

Uruguayan footballer (born 1991)

Personal information
- Full name: Federico Damián Alonso del Monte
- Date of birth: 4 April 1991 (age 35)
- Place of birth: Montevideo, Uruguay
- Height: 1.86 m (6 ft 1 in)
- Position: Centre-back

Team information
- Current team: Miramar Misiones
- Number: 15

Youth career
- 2010–2013: River Plate

Senior career*
Years	Team	Apps	(Gls)
2013–2014	Villa Teresa	12	(3)
2014	Aucas		(4)
2015–2017	Fuerza Amarilla	62+	(6)
2018	Murciélagos	6	(0)
2018	Atlético Venezuela	8	(1)
2019	Cerro	29	(1)
2020–2022	Universitario	60	(6)
2023	Cusco FC	25	(1)
2024–	Miramar Misiones	11	(0)
- * Club domestic league appearances and goals as of 14 September 2024

Federico Damián Alonso del Monte (born 4 April 1991) is an Uruguayan professional footballer who plays as a centre-back for Miramar Misiones.

== Career ==
Alonso came from the youth ranks of River Plate de Montevideo, leaving the club without making his professional debut. He signed for Villa Teresa in 2013, making his debut in the Uruguayan Segunda División in October of that same year. Alonso kept a good performance at Villa Teresa and scored 3 goals. In 2014, he was signed by S.D. Aucas from the Ecuadorian Serie B, achieving promotion that same year. However, the club's directive did not further renew his contract.

In 2015, he was signed as a free agent by recently promoted Fuerza Amarilla, also from the Ecuadorian Serie B, with a contract for two years. At the end of the season, the club was promoted to the Ecuadorian Serie A. The next season, on matchday 3, Alonso scored the winning goal against Liga de Quito. The team finished the year qualifying to the 2017 Copa Sudamericana for the first time, where they reached the second stage. At the end of the 2017 season, Fuerza Amarilla finished in the last place of the league table and was relegated to the Serie B.

In December 2017, Alonso signed for Murciélagos F.C. of the Ascenso MX, playing only 6 games in the first semester of 2018. In June 2018, he was announced as a new signing of Atlético Venezuela for the Torneo Clausura.

In 2019, he went back to Uruguay to play at Cerro, where he returned to playing on the regular: a total of 29 league matches apart from playing the 2019 Copa Sudamericana.

== Honours ==
Universitario de Deportes

- Torneo Apertura 2020
