= 2022 SE Palmeiras season =

Palmeiras
2022 season
- President: Leila Pereira
- Coach: Abel Ferreira
- Stadium: Allianz Parque
- Série A: 1st
- Campeonato Paulista: Winners
- Copa Libertadores: Semi-finals
- Copa do Brasil: Round of 16
- Recopa Sudamericana: Winners
- Top goalscorer: League: Rony (12 goals); All: Rony (23 goals)
- Highest home attendance: 41,361 (vs. São Paulo – 14 July 2022)
- Lowest home attendance: 14,960 (vs. Juazeirense – 30 April 2022)
- Average home league attendance: 31,690
Home colors	Away colors	Third colors

The 2022 season was the 108th in Sociedade Esportiva Palmeiras' existence. This season Palmeiras participated in the Campeonato Paulista, Copa Libertadores, Copa do Brasil, Série A and Recopa Sudamericana.

== Squad information ==
Note: Flags indicate national team as defined under FIFA eligibility rules; some limited exceptions apply. Players may hold more than one non-FIFA nationality.

No.	Pos.	Nation	Player
1	GK	BRA	Vinícius
2	DF	BRA	Marcos Rocha
4	DF	CHI	Benjamín Kuscevic
6	DF	BRA	Jorge
7	FW	BRA	Dudu
8	MF	BRA	Zé Rafael
9	FW	URU	Miguel Merentiel
10	FW	BRA	Rony
11	FW	BRA	Wesley
12	DF	BRA	Mayke
13	DF	BRA	Luan
14	MF	BRA	Gustavo Scarpa
15	DF	PAR	Gustavo Gómez (captain)
16	FW	BRA	Endrick

No.	Pos.	Nation	Player
18	FW	ARG	José Manuel López
19	FW	BRA	Breno Lopes
20	MF	COL	Eduard Atuesta
21	GK	BRA	Weverton (vice-captain)
22	DF	URU	Joaquín Piquerez
23	MF	BRA	Raphael Veiga
25	MF	BRA	Gabriel Menino
26	DF	BRA	Murilo
27	MF	BRA	Bruno Tabata
28	MF	BRA	Danilo
29	FW	BRA	Rafael Navarro
30	MF	BRA	Jailson
36	DF	BRA	Vanderlan
42	GK	BRA	Marcelo Lomba

=== Transfers ===
==== Transfers in ====
Pos.	Player	Transferred from	Fee/notes	Date	Source
MF	(Colombia) Eduard Atuesta	(United States) Los Angeles FC	Sign.	13 December 2021	
GK	(Brazil) Marcelo Lomba	(Brazil) Internacional	Sign.	14 December 2021	
FW	(Brazil) Rafael Navarro	(Brazil) Botafogo	Sign.	22 December 2021	
MF	(Brazil) Jailson	Unattached	Sign.	7 January 2022	
DF	(Brazil) Murilo	(Russia) Lokomotiv Moscow	Sign.	11 January 2022	
FW	(Uruguay) Miguel Merentiel	(Argentina) Defensa y Justicia	Sign.	18 May 2022	
FW	(Argentina) José Manuel López	(Argentina) Lanús	Sign.	16 June 2022	
MF	(Brazil) Bruno Tabata	(Portugal) Sporting	≅€5,000,000	8 August 2022	

==== Transfers out ====
Pos.	Player	Transferred to	Fee/notes	Date	Source
DF	(Brazil) Victor Luis	(Brazil) Ceará	Loan.	5 January 2022	
MF	(Brazil) Danilo Barbosa	(France) Nice	Loan return.	6 January 2022	
MF	(Brazil) Lucas Lima	(Brazil) Fortaleza	Loan.	11 January 2022	
MF	(Brazil) Matheus Fernandes	(Brazil) Athletico Paranaense	Loan.	19 January 2022	
FW	(Brazil) Luiz Adriano	(Turkey) Antalyaspor	Contract terminated.	1 February 2022	
MF	(Brazil) Patrick de Paula	(Brazil) Botafogo	Sign.	20 March 2022	
DF	(Brazil) Renan	(Brazil) Red Bull Bragantino	Loan.	8 April 2022	
FW	(Brazil) Deyverson		Released.	26 May 2022	
FW	(Brazil) Gabriel Veron	(Portugal) Porto	Sign.	21 July 2022	

== Competitions ==
=== Overview ===
Competition	First match	Last match	Starting round	Final position	Record							
Competition	First match	Last match	Starting round	Final position	Pld	W	D	L	GF	GA	GD	Win %
Série A	9 April 2022	13 November 2022	Matchday 1	Winners	38	23	12	3	66	27	+39	60.53
Copa do Brasil	30 April 2022	14 July 2022	Third round	Round of 16	4	3	0	1	6	4	+2	75.00
Campeonato Paulista	23 January 2022	3 April 2022	Matchday 1	Winners	16	12	3	1	26	7	+19	75.00
Copa Libertadores	6 April 2022	6 September 2022	Group stage	Semi-finals	12	8	3	1	37	8	+29	66.67
Recopa Sudamericana	23 February 2022	2 March 2022	Final	Winners	2	1	1	0	4	2	+2	50.00
Total					72	47	19	6	139	48	+91	65.28

Source: Competitions

=== Campeonato Paulista ===
Palmeiras was drawn into Group C.

==== First stage ====
Pos	Team	Pld	W	D	L	GF	GA	GD	Pts	Qualification or relegation
1	Palmeiras	12	9	3	0	17	3	+14	30	Knockout stage
2	Ituano	12	5	4	3	19	12	+7	19	Knockout stage
3	Botafogo	12	5	3	4	10	12	−2	18	
4	Mirassol	12	4	5	3	17	17	0	17	

Source: Soccerway

23 January 2022 5	Novorizontino	0–2	Palmeiras	Novo Horizonte
16:00 UTC−3	Cléo Silva (yellow card) 49'; Giovanni (red card) 90+2'	Report	Zé Rafael (yellow card) 44', (goal) 45+3'; Dudu 46'	Stadium: Estádio Doutor Jorge Ismael de Biasi; Attendance: 4,693; Referee: Luiz Flávio de Oliveira
Note: The match against Novorizontino, originally scheduled for February 9, was brought forward to January 23, due to the Palmeiras participation in the 2021 FIFA Club World Cup.

26 January 2022 1	Palmeiras	3–0	Ponte Preta	São Paulo
21:35 UTC−3	Murilo 9', (yellow card) 42'; Luan 22'; Rony 28'; Raphael Veiga (yellow card) 31'	Report	Marcos Júnior (yellow card) 20'; Norberto (yellow card) 81'; Wesley (yellow card) 84'	Stadium: Allianz Parque; Attendance: 17,662; Referee: Raphael Claus

29 January 2022 2	São Bernardo	1–1	Palmeiras	São Bernardo do Campo
16:00 UTC−3	Silvinho (yellow card) 1', (goal) 36'; Gabriel (yellow card) 45+3'	Report	Wesley 66' (pen.); Breno Lopes (yellow card) 86'	Stadium: Estádio 1º de Maio; Attendance: 3,001; Referee: Douglas Marques das Flores

1 February 2022 3	Palmeiras	1–0	Água Santa	São Paulo
19:00 UTC−3	Danilo (yellow card) 24'; Dudu 27'; Gómez (yellow card) 45'	Report	Matheus Oliveira (yellow card) 24'; Rodrigo Sam (yellow card) 29'; Cristiano (yellow card) 55'; Rhuan (yellow card) 60'; Hélder (yellow card) 70'	Stadium: Allianz Parque; Attendance: 22,589; Referee: Salim Fende Chavez

16 February 2022 7	Ferroviária	0–2	Palmeiras	Araraquara
19:00 UTC−3	Marquinhos (yellow card) 37'; Bernardo (yellow card) 60'; Bruno Leonardo (yellow card) 63'; Bruno Mezenga (yellow card) 64'	Report	Murilo 38'; Breno Lopes 66'	Stadium: Estádio Fonte Luminosa; Attendance: 5,325; Referee: Raphael Claus

19 February 2022 8	Palmeiras	1–0	Santo André	São Paulo
16:00 UTC−3	Raphael Veiga 34' (pen.); Atuesta (yellow card) 62'	Report	Serginho (yellow card) 45+3'; Gustavo Nescau (yellow card) 71'; Jeferson (yellow card) 90+3'	Stadium: Allianz Parque; Attendance: 20,723; Referee: Thiago Lourenço de Mattos

27 February 2022 9	Internacional de Limeira	0–0	Palmeiras	Limeira
16:00 UTC−3	Celsinho (yellow card) 45+3'; Geovane (yellow card) 63'	Report		Stadium: Estádio Major José Levy Sobrinho; Attendance: 7,858; Referee: Vinícius Furlan

6 March 2022 10	Palmeiras	2–0	Guarani	São Paulo
16:00 UTC−3	Gustavo Scarpa 45+6' (pen.), (yellow card) 60'; Jorge (yellow card) 45+8'; Wesley 90+3'	Report	Maxwell (yellow card) 45+8'; Rodrigo Andrade (red card) 81'	Stadium: Allianz Parque; Attendance: 23,916; Referee: Fabiano Monteiro dos Santos

10 March 2022 4	São Paulo	0–1	Palmeiras	São Paulo
20:30 UTC−3	Rafinha (yellow card) 43' (yellow-red card) 81'; Arboleda (yellow card) 61'; Luciano (yellow card) 86'	Report	Rony 10'; Zé Rafael (yellow card) 63'; Piquerez (yellow card) 87'	Stadium: Morumbi; Attendance: 46,378; Referee: Douglas Marques das Flores
Note: The match against São Paulo, originally scheduled for the 6 February, was postponed to 10 March, due to the Palmeiras participation in the 2021 FIFA Club World Cup.

13 March 2022 11	Palmeiras	1–0	Santos	São Paulo
18:30 UTC−3	Raphael Veiga 45+5' (pen.); Marcos Rocha (yellow card) 62'	Report	Auro (yellow card) 18'; Velászquez (yellow card) 37' (yellow-red card) 45+2'; Lucas Pires (yellow card) 64'	Stadium: Allianz Parque; Attendance: 38,381; Referee: Raphael Claus

17 March 2022 6	Palmeiras	2–1	Corinthians	São Paulo
20:30 UTC−3	Raphael Veiga 29' (pen.); Zé Rafael (yellow card) 55'; Danilo 69'	Report	Gil (yellow card) 26'; Lucas Piton (yellow card) 45+3'; Róger Guedes 61' (pen.); Fagner (yellow card) 75'; Willian (yellow card) 90+3'	Stadium: Allianz Parque; Attendance: 39,511; Referee: Matheus Delgado Candançan
Note: The match against Corinthians, originally scheduled for the 13 February, was postponed to 17 March, due to the Palmeiras participation in the 2021 FIFA Club World Cup.

20 March 2022 12	Red Bull Bragantino	1–1	Palmeiras	Bragança Paulista
16:00 UTC−3	Hurtado (yellow card) 15'; Helinho 26'; Jadsom (yellow card) 75'	Report	Atuesta (yellow card) 76'; Deyverson 82' (pen.), (red card) 84'	Stadium: Estádio Nabi Abi Chedid; Referee: Flávio Rodrigues de Souza

==== Quarter-final ====
23 March 2022	Palmeiras	2–0	Ituano	São Paulo
21:35 UTC−3	Raphael Veiga 3' (pen.); Rony 55'; Breno Lopes (yellow card) 90+1'	Report	Kaio Mendes (yellow card) 31'; Jiménez (yellow card) 79'; Iago Teles (yellow card) 90+1'; Pacheco (yellow card) 90+6'	Stadium: Allianz Parque; Attendance: 27,260; Referee: Thiago Luis Scarascati

==== Semi-final ====
26 March 2022	Palmeiras	2–1	Red Bull Bragantino	São Paulo
18:30 UTC−3	Murilo 2', (yellow card) 69'; Rony (yellow card) 35', (goal) 40'; Zé Rafael (yellow card) 76'	Report	Realpe 18', (yellow card) 47'; Jadsom (yellow card) 32'; Helinho (yellow card) 72'; Aderlan (yellow card) 83'	Stadium: Allianz Parque; Attendance: 37,618; Referee: Luiz Flávio De Oliveira

==== Finals ====
30 March 2022 First leg	São Paulo	3–1	Palmeiras	São Paulo
21:40 UTC−3	Patrick (yellow card) 36'; Calleri 45+6' (pen.), 81'; Rodrigo Nestor (yellow card) 57'; Diego Costa (yellow card) 61'; Pablo Maia 64'; Jandrei (yellow card) 86'	Report	Jailson (yellow card) 45+2'; Raphael Veiga 85'; Gabriel Veron (yellow card) 90+2'	Stadium: Morumbi; Attendance: 60,383; Referee: Douglas Marques das Flores

3 April 2022 Second leg	Palmeiras	4–0 (5–3 agg.)	São Paulo	São Paulo
16:00 UTC−3	Danilo 22'; Zé Rafael 28', (yellow card) 84'; Raphael Veiga 47', 81', (yellow card) 82'; Gómez (yellow card) 72'; Wesley (yellow card) 90+1'	Report	Luan (yellow card) 72'; Luciano (yellow card) 83'; Rafinha (red card) 90'	Stadium: Allianz Parque; Attendance: 31,836; Referee: Raphael Claus

=== Copa Libertadores ===
==== Group stage ====
The draw for the group stage was held on 25 March 2022, 12:00 PYST (UTC−3), at the CONMEBOL Convention Centre in Luque, Paraguay.

Pos	Team	Pld	W	D	L	GF	GA	GD	Pts	Qualification
1	(Brazil) Palmeiras	6	6	0	0	25	3	+22	18	Round of 16
2	(Ecuador) Emelec	6	2	2	2	14	7	+7	8	Round of 16
3	(Venezuela) Deportivo Táchira	6	2	1	3	8	14	−6	7	Copa Sudamericana
4	(Bolivia) Independiente Petrolero	6	0	1	5	3	26	−23	1	

Source: CONMEBOL
Rules for classification: 1) Points; 2) Goal difference; 3) Goals scored; 4) Away goals scored; 5) CONMEBOL ranking.

6 April 2022 1	Deportivo Táchira (Venezuela)	0–4	(Brazil) Palmeiras	San Cristóbal, Venezuela
21:00 UTC−3	Perea (yellow card) 63'; Flores (yellow card) 87'	Report	Dudu 8'; Raphael Veiga 35'; Jaílson (yellow card) 36' (yellow-red card) 72'; Rafael Navarro 48', 53'; Atuesta (yellow card) 66'	Stadium: Estadio Polideportivo de Pueblo Nuevo; Referee: Darío Herrera (Argentina)

12 April 2022 2	Palmeiras (Brazil)	8–1	(Bolivia) Independiente Petrolero	São Paulo, Brazil
21:30 UTC−3	Zé Rafael 41'; Rafael Navarro 47', 54', 56', 78'; Rony 80'; Raphael Veiga 86', 90'	Report	Correa 6'; Folleco (yellow card) 8'; Rioja (yellow card) 42'; Cristaldo (yellow card) 48'; Giménez (yellow card) 90'	Stadium: Allianz Parque; Attendance: 26,409; Referee: Derlis López (Paraguay)

27 April 2022 3	Emelec (Ecuador)	1–3	(Brazil) Palmeiras	Guayaquil, Ecuador
21:00 UTC−3	Nazareno (yellow card) 34'; Guevara (yellow card) 51'; Rojas 62'; Zapata (yellow card) 69'; Arroyo (yellow card) 81'	Report	Rony 19'; Gabriel Veron 25'; Wesley (yellow card) 57'; Gustavo Scarpa (yellow card) 81'; Breno Lopes 90+2'	Stadium: Estadio George Capwell; Referee: Patricio Loustau (Argentina)

3 May 2022 4	Independiente Petrolero (Bolivia)	0–5	(Brazil) Palmeiras	Sucre, Bolivia
21:30 UTC−3	Cristaldo (red card) 45+2'; Alaca (yellow card) 71'	Report	Raphael Veiga 17' (pen.), 22', 60'; Rony (yellow card) 37'; Marcos Rocha (yellow card) 39'; Rafael Navarro 62'; Wesley (yellow card) 69'; Murilo 74'; Mayke (yellow card) 90+3'	Stadium: Estadio Olímpico Patria; Referee: Nicolás Lamolina (Argentina)

18 May 2022 5	Palmeiras (Brazil)	1–0	(Ecuador) Emelec	São Paulo, Brazil
19:00 UTC−3	Danilo 74'	Report	Carabalí (yellow card) 46'; Rodríguez (yellow card) 53'; Ortíz (yellow card) 56'	Stadium: Allianz Parque; Attendance: 32,553; Referee: Nicolás Gamboa (Chile)

24 May 2022 6	Palmeiras (Brazil)	4–1	(Venezuela) Deportivo Táchira	São Paulo, Brazil
21:30 UTC−3	Gustavo Scarpa 15', 22' (pen.), 68' (pen.); Zé Rafael (yellow card) 42'; Rony 57'	Report	Benítez (yellow card) 36'; Flores (yellow card) 42'; Gutiérrez 48'; Restrepo (yellow card) 66'	Stadium: Allianz Parque; Attendance: 29,032; Referee: Carlos Ortega (Colombia)

==== Round of 16 ====
The draw for the round of 16 was held on 27 May 2022, 12:00 PYST (UTC−4), at the CONMEBOL Convention Centre in Luque, Paraguay.

29 June 2022 First leg	Cerro Porteño (Paraguay)	0–3	(Brazil) Palmeiras	Asunción, Paraguay
19:15 UTC−3	Espínola (yellow card) 80'	Report	Gustavo Scarpa (yellow card) 56'; Rony 60', 69'; Murilo 87'	Stadium: Estadio General Pablo Rojas; Referee: Wilmar Roldán (Colombia)

6 July 2022 Second leg	Palmeiras (Brazil)	5–0 (8–0 agg.)	(Paraguay) Cerro Porteño	São Paulo, Brazil
19:15 UTC−3	Samudio 37' (o.g.); Gabriel Menino (yellow card) 40'; Danilo (yellow card) 52'; Rony (yellow card) 59', (goal) 73', 83'; Breno Lopes 75'; Gómez 78'	Report	Patiño (yellow card) 46'	Stadium: Allianz Parque; Attendance: 37,431; Referee: Patricio Loustau (Argentina)

==== Quarter-finals ====
3 August 2022 First leg	Atlético Mineiro (Brazil)	2–2	(Brazil) Palmeiras	Belo Horizonte, Brazil
21:30 UTC−3	Hulk 45+1' (pen.); Murilo 47' (o.g.); Jair (yellow card) 49'; Mariano (yellow card) 90+1'	Report	Murilo 59'; Danilo 90+2'	Stadium: Mineirão; Attendance: 57,140; Referee: Facundo Tello (Argentina)

10 August 2022 Second leg	Palmeiras (Brazil)	0–0 (2–2 agg.) (6–5 p)	(Brazil) Atlético Mineiro	São Paulo, Brazil
21:30 UTC−3	Danilo (red card) 29'; Gómez (yellow card) 58'; Gustavo Scarpa (red card) 82'; Dudu (yellow card) 88'	Report	Zaracho (yellow card) 52'; Arana (yellow card) 73'; Nathan Silva (yellow card) 78'; Vargas (yellow card) 85' (yellow-red card) 90+6'; Hulk (yellow card) 88'	Stadium: Allianz Parque; Attendance: 40,433; Referee: Wilmar Roldán (Colombia)
	Penalties
	Raphael Veiga (penalty scored); Gómez (penalty scored); Zé Rafael (penalty scored); Piquerez (penalty scored); Rony (penalty scored); Murilo (penalty scored)		(penalty scored) Hulk; (penalty scored) Fernández; (penalty scored) Jair; (penalty scored) Eduardo Sasha; (penalty scored) Alonso; (penalty missed) Rubens

==== Semi-finals ====
30 August 2022 First leg	Athletico Paranaense (Brazil)	1–0	(Brazil) Palmeiras	Curitiba, Brazil
21:30 UTC−3	Alex Santana 23'; Hugo Moura (yellow card) 58' (yellow-red card) 70'	Report	Zé Rafael (yellow card) 58'	Stadium: Arena da Baixada; Attendance: 38,963; Referee: Roberto Tobar (Chile)

6 September 2022 Second leg	Palmeiras (Brazil)	2–2 (2–3 agg.)	(Brazil) Athletico Paranaense	São Paulo, Brazil
21:30 UTC−3	Gustavo Scarpa 3'; Gabriel Menino (yellow card) 40'; Murilo (red card) 45+3'; Gómez 55'; Weverton (yellow card) 90+4'	Report	Alex Santana (yellow card) 27'; Canobbio (yellow card) 42'; Pablo 64'; Pedrinho (yellow card) 67'; Thiago Heleno (yellow card) 81'; Terans 85'	Stadium: Allianz Parque; Attendance: 40,590; Referee: Esteban Ostojich (Uruguay)

=== Série A ===
==== Standings ====
Pos	Team	Pld	W	D	L	GF	GA	GD	Pts	Qualification or relegation
1	Palmeiras (C)	38	23	12	3	66	27	+39	81	Qualification for Copa Libertadores group stage (Note: Flamengo qualified for the Copa Libertadores group stage by winning the 2022 Copa Libertadores. Since they also won the 2022 Copa do Brasil, the berth awarded to the Copa do Brasil champions (Copa Libertadores group stage) was passed over to the league's best placed team not already qualified.)
2	Internacional	38	20	13	5	58	31	+27	73	Qualification for Copa Libertadores group stage
3	Fluminense	38	21	7	10	63	41	+22	70	Qualification for Copa Libertadores group stage
4	Corinthians	38	18	11	9	44	36	+8	65	Qualification for Copa Libertadores group stage
5	Flamengo	38	18	8	12	60	39	+21	62	Qualification for Copa Libertadores group stage

Source: CBF
Rules for classification: 1) points; 2) wins; 3) goal difference; 4) goals scored; 5) head-to-head results (only between two teams); 6) fewest red cards; 7) fewest yellow cards; 8) drawing of lots.
(C) Champions

==== Result by round ====
Round	1	2	3	4	5	6	7	8	9	10	11	12	13	14	15	16	17	18	19	20	21	22	23	24	25	26	27	28	29	30	31	32	33	34	35	36	37	38
Ground	H	A	H	A	H	H	A	A	H	H	A	H	A	A	H	A	H	A	H	A	H	A	H	A	A	H	H	A	A	H	A	H	H	A	H	A	H	A
Result	L	D	W	D	D	W	W	W	D	W	W	W	W	D	L	D	W	W	W	W	W	W	D	D	D	W	W	W	W	W	D	D	W	W	W	D	W	L
Position	14	15	8	11	13	9	2	1	2	1	1	1	1	1	1	1	1	1	1	1	1	1	1	1	1	1	1	1	1	1	1	1	1	1	1	1	1	1

Source: CBF

==== Matches ====
9 April 2022 1	Palmeiras	2–3	Ceará	São Paulo
21:00 UTC−3	Jorge (yellow card) 20'; Zé Rafael 22', (yellow card) 32'; Marcos Rocha (yellow card) 50'; Gómez 90+6' (pen.); Danilo (yellow card) 90+10'	Report	Jorge 7' (o.g.); Mendoza 14', (yellow card) 28'; Vina (yellow card) 27' (yellow-red card) 90+10'; Luiz Otávio (yellow card) 33'; Richard (yellow card) 63'; Erick (yellow card) 73'; Geovane (yellow card) 82'; Lucas Ribeiro 85'; Rodrigo Lindoso (yellow card) 90+5'; Iury (yellow card) 90+8'; Nino Paraíba (yellow card) 90+11'	Stadium: Allianz Parque; Attendance: 27,100; Referee: Caio Max Augusto Vieira (Rio Grande do Norte)

16 April 2022 2	Goiás	1–1	Palmeiras	Goiânia
16:30 UTC−3	Pedro Raul (yellow card) 49', (goal) 57'; Dadá Belmonte (yellow card) 60'; Fellipe Bastos (yellow card) 85'; Danilo Barcelos (yellow card) 90+8'	Report	Rony 90+6'	Stadium: Serrinha; Attendance: 12,864; Referee: Bráulio da Silva Machado (Santa Catarina)

20 April 2022 4	Flamengo	0–0	Palmeiras	Rio de Janeiro
19:30 UTC−3	João Gomes (yellow card) 43'; Gabriel Barbosa (yellow card) 45+4'; Thiago Maia (yellow card) 70'	Report	Murilo (yellow card) 17'; Rony (yellow card) 45'; Zé Rafael (yellow card) 71'; Marcos Rocha (yellow card) 75'	Stadium: Maracanã; Attendance: 69,997; Referee: Wilton Pereira Sampaio (Goiás)

23 April 2022 3	Palmeiras	3–0	Corinthians	Barueri
19:00 UTC−3	Gómez 14', (yellow card) 50'; Rony 19'; Dudu 71'	Report	Maycon (yellow card) 27'; Lucas Piton (yellow card) 79'	Stadium: Arena Barueri; Attendance: 23,973; Referee: Anderson Daronco (Rio Grande do Sul)
Note: Due to a concert at Allianz Parque in April 23 and 24, Palmeiras hosted this match at Arena Barueri in Barueri.

8 May 2022 5	Palmeiras	1–1	Fluminense	São Paulo
16:00 UTC−3	Gómez (yellow card) 45+2'; Dudu 72'	Report	Nonato (yellow card) 34'; Wellington (yellow card) 45'; Cano 83'	Stadium: Allianz Parque; Attendance: 28,776; Referee: Sávio Pereira Sampaio (Distrito Federal)

14 May 2022 6	Palmeiras	2–0	Red Bull Bragantino	São Paulo
16:30 UTC−3	Gómez (yellow card) 24'; Danilo 30'; Mayke (yellow card) 35'; Raphael Veiga 90+9' (pen.)	Report	Natan (yellow card) 27'; Nathan (yellow card) 72'	Stadium: Allianz Parque; Attendance: 36,123; Referee: Flávio Rodrigues de Souza (São Paulo)

21 May 2022 7	Juventude	0–3	Palmeiras	Caxias do Sul
19:00 UTC−3	Jean (yellow card) 29'; Jadson (yellow card) 60'; Vitor Gabriel (yellow card) 83'	Report	Zé Rafael 9'; Rony 31'; Gabriel Menino 90+2'	Stadium: Alfredo Jaconi; Attendance: 5,513; Referee: Marcelo de Lima Henrique (Ceará)

29 May 2022 8	Santos	0–1	Palmeiras	Santos
16:00 UTC−3	Fernández (yellow card) 70'; Maicon (yellow card) 73'; João Paulo (yellow card) 81'; Bruno Oliveira (yellow card) 85'; Vinicius Zanocelo (yellow card) 89'	Report	Gabriel Menino (yellow card) 59'; Gómez 80'	Stadium: Vila Belmiro; Attendance: 14,220; Referee: Luiz Flávio de Oliveira (São Paulo)

5 June 2022 9	Palmeiras	0–0	Atlético Mineiro	São Paulo
16:00 UTC−3	Gabriel Menino (yellow card) 37'	Report	Mariano (yellow card) 33'; Fernández (yellow card) 37'; Otávio (yellow card) 70'	Stadium: Allianz Parque; Attendance: 40,235; Referee: Wilton Pereira Sampaio (Goiás)

9 June 2022 10	Palmeiras	4–0	Botafogo	São Paulo
19:00 UTC−3	Rony 11', 33'; Gustavo Scarpa 18'; Piquerez (yellow card) 79'; Wesley 87'	Report	Saravia (yellow card) 32'	Stadium: Allianz Parque; Attendance: 33,431; Referee: Anderson Daronco (Rio Grande do Sul)

12 June 2022 11	Coritiba	0–2	Palmeiras	Curitiba
18:00 UTC−3	Guilherme Biro (yellow card) 36'; Thonny Anderson (red card) 72'	Report	Dudu 23', (yellow card) 34'; Rony 63'; Fabinho (yellow card) 84'	Stadium: Couto Pereira; Attendance: 30,041; Referee: Leandro Vuaden (Rio Grande do Sul)

16 June 2022 12	Palmeiras	4–2	Atlético Goianiense	São Paulo
18:00 UTC−3	Danilo (yellow card) 23'; Zé Rafael 42', (yellow card) 50'; Gómez 44', 45+4'; Gustavo Scarpa 45'	Report	Luan 29' (o.g.); Churín (yellow card) 39', (goal) 79'; Arthur Henrique (red card) 74'	Stadium: Allianz Parque; Attendance: 38,888; Referee: Ramon Abatti Abel (Santa Catarina)

20 June 2022 13	São Paulo	1–2	Palmeiras	São Paulo
20:00 UTC−3	Patrick 17'; Igor Vinícius (yellow card) 39'; Reinaldo (yellow card) 45+3'; Gabriel Neves (yellow card) 46'	Report	Danilo (yellow card) 45+4'; Gómez 90'; Murilo 90+6'	Stadium: Morumbi; Attendance: 31,035; Referee: Anderson Daronco (Rio Grande do Sul)

26 June 2022 14	Avaí	2–2	Palmeiras	Florianópolis
16:00 UTC−3	William Pottker (yellow card) 18'; Bruno Cortez (yellow card) 45+1'; Bressan (yellow card) 47'; Bissoli 45+8' (pen.); Arthur Chaves (yellow card) 49'; Jean Pyerre 73'	Report	Luan (yellow card) 4'; Gustavo Scarpa 47' (pen.); Rony 65'	Stadium: Ressacada; Attendance: 15,204; Referee: Wagner do Nascimento Magalhães (Rio de Janeiro)

2 July 2022 15	Palmeiras	0–2	Athletico Paranaense	São Paulo
21:00 UTC−3	Piquerez (yellow card) 57'; Gabriel Menino (red card) 90+1'	Report	Vitor Roque 36'; Pedro Henrique (yellow card) 39'; Abner (yellow card) 39'; Vitor Bueno 58' (pen.)	Stadium: Allianz Parque; Attendance: 39,192; Referee: Bráulio da Silva Machado (Santa Catarina)

10 July 2022 16	Fortaleza	0–0	Palmeiras	Fortaleza
18:00 UTC−3		Report	Rony (yellow card) 73'	Stadium: Arena Castelão; Attendance: 24,888; Referee: Wilton Pereira Sampaio (Goiás)
Note: Match ended in the 89th minute due to a power outage in the stadium.

18 July 2022 17	Palmeiras	1–0	Cuiabá	São Paulo
20:00 UTC−3	Gómez (yellow card) 43'; Gabriel Veron 49'; Murilo (yellow card) 68'; Atuesta (yellow card) 74'	Report	João Lucas (yellow card) 83'	Stadium: Allianz Parque; Attendance: 39,033; Referee: Anderson Daronco (Rio Grande do Sul)

21 July 2022 18	América Mineiro	0–1	Palmeiras	Belo Horizonte
20:00 UTC−3	Iago Maidana (yellow card) 51'; Matheusinho (yellow card) 56'; Raúl Cáceres (yellow card) 56'; Patric (yellow card) 61'	Report	Wesley (yellow card) 17'; Danilo (yellow card) 40'; Gustavo Scarpa 65'; López (yellow card) 90+4'	Stadium: Independência; Attendance: 6,462; Referee: Bráulio da Silva Machado (Santa Catarina)

24 July 2022 19	Palmeiras	2–1	Internacional	São Paulo
16:00 UTC−3	Gómez 18'; Gabriel Menino 88'	Report	Gabriel (yellow card) 41'; Alemão 82'	Stadium: Allianz Parque; Attendance: 38,658; Referee: Bruno Arleu de Araújo (Rio de Janeiro)

30 July 2022 20	Ceará	1–2	Palmeiras	Fortaleza
16:30 UTC−3	Vina (yellow card) 27'; Richardson (red card) 50'; Guilherme Castilho (yellow card) 71'; Mendoza 80' (pen.); Bruno Pacheco (yellow card) 86'	Report	Dudu 31'; López 45'; Marcos Rocha (yellow card) 45+6'; Piquerez (yellow card) 67'; Murilo (yellow card) 83'	Stadium: Arena Castelão; Attendance: 40,912; Referee: Anderson Daronco (Rio Grande do Sul)

7 August 2022 21	Palmeiras	3–0	Goiás	São Paulo
16:00 UTC−3	Mayke 19'; Zé Rafael (yellow card) 42'; Raphael Veiga 45+4'; Atuesta 83'; Gómez (yellow card) 90+3'	Report	Dadá Belmonte (yellow card) 45+2'; Danilo Barcelos (yellow card) 67'; Fellipe Bastos (yellow card) 88'	Stadium: Allianz Parque; Attendance: 38,801; Referee: Jean Pierre Gonçalves Lima (Rio Grande do Sul)

13 August 2022 22	Corinthians	0–1	Palmeiras	São Paulo
19:00 UTC−3	Vera (yellow card) 2'; Róger Guedes (yellow card) 18'	Report	López (yellow card) 40'; Roni 72' (o.g.); Piquerez (yellow card) 85'	Stadium: Neo Química Arena; Attendance: 44,966; Referee: Raphael Claus (São Paulo)

21 August 2022 23	Palmeiras	1–1	Flamengo	São Paulo
16:00 UTC−3	Raphael Veiga 66'	Report	Victor Hugo 29'; João Gomes (yellow card) 50'; Vidal (yellow card) 89'	Stadium: Allianz Parque; Attendance: 40,531; Referee: Ramon Abatti Abel (Santa Catarina)

27 August 2022 24	Fluminense	1–1	Palmeiras	Rio de Janeiro
19:00 UTC−3	Nino (yellow card) 30'; Manoel 38'; Ganso (yellow card) 45+2'; Araújo (yellow card) 50'	Report	Rony 8'; Marcelo Lomba (yellow card) 8'; Raphael Veiga (yellow card) 42'; Murilo (yellow card) 89'	Stadium: Maracanã; Attendance: 45,084; Referee: Bráulio da Silva Machado (Santa Catarina)

3 September 2022 25	Red Bull Bragantino	2–2	Palmeiras	Bragança Paulista
19:00 UTC−3	Artur (yellow card) 20', (goal) 35'; Luan Cândido 25', (yellow card) 58'; Lucas Evangelista (yellow card) 53'; Aderlan (yellow card) 90+3'	Report	Wesley (yellow card) 16'; Atuesta (yellow card) 34'; Cleiton 45+4' (o.g.); Merentiel 71'; Kuscevic (yellow card) 87'; Zé Rafael (yellow card) 90+3'	Stadium: Nabi Abi Chedid; Attendance: 9,685; Referee: Raphael Claus (São Paulo)

10 September 2022 26	Palmeiras	2–1	Juventude	São Paulo
21:00 UTC−3	Rony 46'; Zé Rafael 66'	Report	Jadson (yellow card) 34'; Guilherme Parede 63'; Moraes (yellow card) 73'; Vitor Gabriel (yellow card) 90+4'	Stadium: Allianz Parque; Attendance: 39,337; Referee: Jefferson Ferreira de Moraes (Goiás)

18 September 2022 27	Palmeiras	1–0	Santos	São Paulo
18:30 UTC−3	Zé Rafael (yellow card) 55'; Danilo (red card) 60'; Gabriel Menino (yellow card) 75'; Merentiel 77'; Gómez (yellow card) 90+1'	Report	Zanocelo (yellow card) 35'; Marcos Leonardo (yellow card) 45+1'; Soteldo (yellow card) 71'; Camacho (yellow card) 90+5'	Stadium: Allianz Parque; Attendance: 40,337; Referee: Wilton Pereira Sampaio (Goiás)

28 September 2022 28	Atlético Mineiro	0–1	Palmeiras	Belo Horizonte
21:45 UTC−3	Jair (yellow card) 9'; Dodô (yellow card) 41'; Zaracho (yellow card) 44'	Report	Murilo 51', (yellow card) 72'; Luan (yellow card) 62'; Dudu (yellow card) 77'	Stadium: Mineirão; Attendance: 28,644; Referee: Marcelo de Lima Henrique (Ceará)

3 October 2022 29	Botafogo	1–3	Palmeiras	Rio de Janeiro
20:00 UTC−3	Kanu (yellow card) 8'; Tiquinho 20'; Tchê Tchê (yellow card) 42'; Hugo (yellow card) 63'; Del Piage (yellow card) 90'	Report	Gustavo Scarpa 26' (pen.); Mayke 36'; Gómez (yellow card) 45+4'; Zé Rafael (yellow card) 57' (yellow-red card) 69'; Dudu 60'	Stadium: Estádio Olímpico Nilton Santos; Attendance: 15,171; Referee: Wilton Pereira Sampaio (Goiás)

6 October 2022 30	Palmeiras	4–0	Coritiba	São Paulo
19:00 UTC−3	Mayke 15'; Atuesta (yellow card) 30'; Rony 34'; Gómez 51'; Breno Lopes 77'	Report	Boschilia (yellow card) 42'; Thonny Anderson (yellow card) 89'	Stadium: Allianz Parque; Attendance: 39,877; Referee: Bráulio da Silva Machado (Santa Catarina)

10 October 2022 31	Atlético Goianiense	1–1	Palmeiras	Goiânia
18:30 UTC−3	Edson Fernando (yellow card) 16'; Willian Maranhão (yellow card) 28'; Shaylon 65', (yellow card) 72'; Jorginho (yellow card) 66'	Report	Rony (yellow card) 34'; Murilo 49'; Zé Rafael (yellow card) 66'	Stadium: Antônio Accioly; Attendance: 12,089; Referee: Bruno Arleu de Araújo (Rio de Janeiro)

16 October 2022 32	Palmeiras	0–0	São Paulo	São Paulo
16:00 UTC−3	Zé Rafael (yellow card) 45+4'; Murilo (yellow card) 59'; Breno Lopes (yellow card) 90'	Report	Ferraresi (red card) 45'; Éder (yellow card) 63'; Lucas Beraldo (red card) 90+2'; Welington (yellow card) 90+3'; Calleri (yellow card) 90+6'	Stadium: Allianz Parque; Attendance: 40,795; Referee: Flávio Rodrigues de Souza (São Paulo)

22 October 2022 33	Palmeiras	3–0	Avaí	São Paulo
21:00 UTC−3	Gustavo Scarpa 4' (pen.), (yellow card) 71'; Dudu 55'; Breno Lopes (yellow card) 73'; Vanderlan 90'	Report	Vladimir (yellow card) 2'; Bissoli (yellow card) 40'	Stadium: Allianz Parque; Attendance: 40,044; Referee: Bruno Arleu de Araújo (Rio de Janeiro)

25 October 2022 34	Athletico Paranaense	1–3	Palmeiras	Curitiba
21:45 UTC−3	Rômulo (yellow card) 8'; Matheus Felipe 30'; García (yellow card) 47'; Pablo (yellow card) 54'; Cuello (yellow card) 60' (yellow-red card) 60'	Report	Gómez (yellow card) 10', (goal) 76'; Murilo (yellow card) 53'; Endrick 59', 70'; Gustavo Scarpa (yellow card) 77'; Gustavo Garcia (yellow card) 77'; Piquerez (yellow card) 90'	Stadium: Arena da Baixada; Attendance: 20,502; Referee: Bráulio da Silva Machado (Santa Catarina)

2 November 2022 35	Palmeiras	4–0	Fortaleza	São Paulo
21:30 UTC−3	Rony 15', 48'; Danilo (yellow card) 22'; Dudu 32'; Gustavo Scarpa (yellow card) 33'; Endrick 64'; Zé Rafael (yellow card) 90+1'	Report	Titi (yellow card) 23'	Stadium: Allianz Parque; Attendance: 29,104; Referee: Wilton Pereira Sampaio (Goiás)

6 November 2022 36	Cuiabá	1–1	Palmeiras	Cuiabá
18:30 UTC−3	Jonathan Cafú 6'; Marllon (yellow card) 40'; André Luis (yellow card) 63'	Report	López 75'	Stadium: Arena Pantanal; Attendance: 22,448; Referee: Bráulio da Silva Machado (Santa Catarina)

9 November 2022 37	Palmeiras	2–1	América Mineiro	São Paulo
21:30 UTC−3	Gustavo Scarpa 42' (pen.); Marcos Rocha (yellow card) 48'; Zé Rafael (yellow card) 68'; Murilo 81'; Mayke (yellow card) 84'; Gómez (yellow card) 90+1'	Report	Benítez 15', (yellow card) 41'; Juninho (yellow card) 42'	Stadium: Allianz Parque; Attendance: 28,721; Referee: Sávio Pereira Sampaio (Distrito Federal)

13 November 2022 38	Internacional	3–0	Palmeiras	Porto Alegre
16:00 UTC−3	Maurício 10'; Alemão (yellow card) 33', (goal) 39'; Lucas Ramos (yellow card) 80'; Romero 85'	Report	Atuesta (yellow card) 23'; Endrick (yellow card) 49'; López (yellow card) 88'	Stadium: Beira-Rio; Attendance: 31,632; Referee: Bruno Arleu de Araújo (Rio de Janeiro)

=== Copa do Brasil ===
==== Third round ====
The draw for the third round was held on 28 March 2022. The order of the matches were announced later on the same day.

30 April 2022 First leg	Palmeiras (São Paulo (state))	2–1	(Bahia) Juazeirense	Barueri
21:00 UTC−3	Breno Lopes 13'; Gustavo Scarpa 71'	Report	Nildo Petrolina 5'	Stadium: Arena Barueri; Attendance: 14,960; Referee: Marcelo de Lima Henrique (Ceará)
Note: Due to a concert at Allianz Parque in April 30, Palmeiras hosted the match at Arena Barueri in Barueri.

11 May 2022 Second leg	Juazeirense (Bahia)	1–2 (2–4 agg.)	(São Paulo (state)) Palmeiras	Londrina
19:00 UTC−3	Nildo Petrolina 50'; Wendel (yellow card) 53'; Daniel (yellow card) 77'	Report	Danilo 42'; Raphael Veiga 83' (pen.)	Stadium: Estádio do Café; Attendance: 26,000; Referee: Bruno Arleu de Araújo (Rio de Janeiro)
Note: Juazeirense played their home match at Estádio do Café, Londrina, instead of their regular home stadium Estádio Adauto Moraes, Juazeiro, which did not meet CBF requirements.

==== Round of 16 ====
The draw for the round of 16 was held on 7 June 2022 at CBF headquarters in Rio de Janeiro. The order of the matches were announced later on the same day.

23 June 2022 First leg	São Paulo (São Paulo (state))	1–0	(São Paulo (state)) Palmeiras	São Paulo
20:00 UTC−3	Patrick 31'; Reinaldo (yellow card) 60'; Gabriel Neves (yellow card) 73'	Report	Murilo (yellow card) 48'; Gómez (yellow card) 60'; Marcos Rocha (yellow card) 74'	Stadium: Morumbi; Attendance: 38,201; Referee: Raphael Claus (São Paulo)

14 July 2022 Second leg	Palmeiras (São Paulo (state))	2–1 (2–2 agg.) (3–4 p)	(São Paulo (state)) São Paulo	São Paulo
20:00 UTC−3	Piquerez 10'; Raphael Veiga 13', (yellow card) 30'; Gómez (yellow card) 69'; Marcos Rocha (yellow card) 90+2'	Report	Welington (yellow card) 5'; Gabriel Neves (yellow card) 45'; Rodrigo Nestor (yellow card) 56'; Calleri (yellow card) 64'; Luciano 70' (pen.); Nikão (yellow card) 87'	Stadium: Allianz Parque; Attendance: 41,361; Referee: Leandro Vuaden (Rio Grande do Sul)
	Penalties
	Raphael Veiga (penalty missed); Gustavo Scarpa (penalty scored); Gómez (penalty scored); Piquerez (penalty scored); Wesley (penalty missed)		(penalty missed) Luciano; (penalty scored) Calleri; (penalty scored) Nikão; (penalty scored) Igor Vinícius; (penalty scored) Igor Gomes

=== Recopa Sudamericana ===
Palmeiras qualified for the 2022 Recopa Sudamericana by winning the 2021 Copa Libertadores.

23 February 2022 First leg	Athletico Paranaense (Brazil)	2–2	(Brazil) Palmeiras	Curitiba, Brazil
21:30 UTC−3	Terans 19'; Thiago Heleno (yellow card) 70'; Erick (yellow card) 73'; Marlos 76'; Hernández (yellow card) 90+6'	Report	Jailson 28'; Raphael Veiga 90+7' (pen.)	Stadium: Arena da Baixada; Attendance: 25,072; Referee: Facundo Tello (Argentina)

2 March 2022 Second leg	Palmeiras (Brazil)	2–0 (4–2 agg.)	(Brazil) Athletico Paranaense	São Paulo, Brazil
21:30 UTC−3	Zé Rafael 50'; Danilo 88'	Report		Stadium: Allianz Parque; Attendance: 30,065; Referee: Jesús Valenzuela (Venezuela)

== Statistics ==
=== Overall statistics ===
Games played	72 (16 Campeonato Paulista, 12 Copa Libertadores, 38 Série A, 4 Copa do Brasil, 2 Recopa Sudamericana)
Games won	47 (12 Campeonato Paulista, 8 Copa Libertadores, 23 Série A, 3 Copa do Brasil, 1 Recopa Sudamericana)
Games drawn	19 (3 Campeonato Paulista, 3 Copa Libertadores, 12 Série A, 0 Copa do Brasil, 1 Recopa Sudamericana)
Games lost	6 (1 Campeonato Paulista, 1 Copa Libertadores, 3 Série A, 1 Copa do Brasil, 0 Recopa Sudamericana)
Goals scored	139
Goals conceded	48
Goal difference	+91 (+19 Campeonato Paulista, +29 Copa Libertadores, +39 Série A, +2 Copa do Brasil, +2 Recopa Sudamericana)
Clean sheets	37
Most clean sheets	Weverton (30)
Best result	8–1 (vs. Independiente Petrolero, Copa Libertadores – April 12)
Worst result	0–3 (vs. Internacional, Campeonato Brasileiro – November 12)
Yellow cards	124
Red cards	8
Top scorer	Rony (23 goals)

=== Goalscorers ===
In italic players who left the team in mid-season.

Place	Position	Nationality	Number	Name	Campeonato Paulista	Copa Libertadores	Série A	Copa do Brasil	Recopa Sudamericana	Total
1	FW	(Brazil)	10	Rony	4	7	12	0	0	23
2	MF	(Brazil)	23	Raphael Veiga	7	6	3	2	1	19
3	MF	(Brazil)	14	Gustavo Scarpa	1	4	7	1	0	13
4	DF	(Paraguay)	15	Gómez	0	2	9	0	0	11
4	DF	(Brazil)	26	Murilo	3	3	5	0	0	11
5	FW	(Brazil)	7	Dudu	2	1	7	0	0	10
6	MF	(Brazil)	8	Zé Rafael	2	1	4	0	1	8
7	FW	(Brazil)	29	Rafael Navarro	0	7	0	0	0	7
8	MF	(Brazil)	28	Danilo	2	2	1	1	1	7
9	FW	(Brazil)	19	Breno Lopes	0	2	2	1	0	5
10	FW	(Brazil)	11	Wesley	2	0	1	0	0	3
10	FW	(Brazil)	16	Endrick	0	0	3	0	0	3
10	FW	(Argentina)	18	López	0	0	3	0	0	3
11	FW	(Brazil)	27	Gabriel Veron	0	1	1	0	0	2
11	MF	(Brazil)	25	Gabriel Menino	0	0	2	0	0	2
11	FW	(Uruguay)	9	Merentiel	0	0	2	0	0	2
12	DF	(Brazil)	13	Luan	1	0	0	0	0	1
12	MF	(Brazil)	30	Jailson	0	0	0	0	1	1
12	FW	(Brazil)	16	Deyverson	1	0	0	0	0	1
12	DF	(Uruguay)	22	Piquerez	0	0	0	1	0	1
12	DF	(Brazil)	12	Mayke	0	0	3	0	0	3
12	MF	(Colombia)	20	Atuesta	0	0	1	0	0	1
12	DF	(Brazil)	36	Vanderlan	0	0	1	0	0	1
