= 2020 SE Palmeiras season =

Palmeiras
2020 season
- President: Maurício Galiotte
- Coach: Vanderlei Luxemburgo (until October 14); Andrey Lopes (interim); Abel Ferreira (from October 30)
- Stadium: Allianz Parque
- Série A: 7th
- Campeonato Paulista: Winners
- Copa Libertadores: Winners
- Copa do Brasil: Winners
- FIFA Club World Cup: Fourth place
- Top goalscorer: League: Raphael Veiga (11); All: Luiz Adriano (20)
- Highest home attendance: 28,267 (vs. Guaraní – March 10)
- Lowest home attendance: 14,748 (vs. Oeste – January 29)
Home colors	Away colors	Third colors

The 2020 season was the 106th in Sociedade Esportiva Palmeiras' existence. This season Palmeiras participated in the Campeonato Paulista, Copa Libertadores, Copa do Brasil and the Série A and also the FIFA Club World Cup.

== Squad information ==
Note: Flags indicate national team as defined under FIFA eligibility rules; some limited exceptions apply. Players may hold more than one non-FIFA nationality.

No.	Pos.	Nation	Player
1	GK	BRA	Weverton
2	DF	BRA	Marcos Rocha
3	DF	BRA	Emerson Santos
4	DF	CHI	Benjamín Kuscevic
5	MF	BRA	Patrick de Paula
8	MF	BRA	Zé Rafael
9	FW	BRA	Luan Silva (on loan from Vitória)
10	FW	BRA	Luiz Adriano
11	FW	BRA	Rony
12	DF	BRA	Mayke
13	DF	BRA	Luan
14	MF	BRA	Gustavo Scarpa
15	DF	PAR	Gustavo Gómez
16	DF	BRA	Lucas Esteves

No.	Pos.	Nation	Player
17	DF	URU	Matías Viña
20	MF	BRA	Lucas Lima
21	FW	BRA	Wesley
23	MF	BRA	Raphael Veiga
25	MF	BRA	Gabriel Menino
27	FW	BRA	Gabriel Veron
28	MF	BRA	Danilo
29	FW	BRA	Willian
30	MF	BRA	Felipe Melo (captain)
33	DF	BRA	Alan Empereur
39	FW	BRA	Breno Lopes
42	GK	BRA	Jailson
72	GK	BRA	Vinícius Silvestre

=== Copa Libertadores squad ===
- Players in ~~strike~~ are no longer in the squad
- Players in italic were included in the last submission

Note: Flags indicate national team as defined under FIFA eligibility rules; some limited exceptions apply. Players may hold more than one non-FIFA nationality.

No.	Pos.	Nation	Player
1	GK	BRA	Weverton
2	DF	BRA	Marcos Rocha
3	DF	BRA	Emerson Santos
4	DF	CHI	Benjamín Kuscevic (Note: Replaced Vitor Hugo)
5	MF	BRA	Patrick de Paula
6	DF	BRA	~~Diogo Barbosa~~
7	FW	BRA	Gabriel Silva (Note: Replaced Dudu)
8	MF	BRA	Zé Rafael
9	FW	BRA	Luan Silva
10	FW	BRA	Luiz Adriano
11	FW	BRA	Rony
12	DF	BRA	Mayke
13	DF	BRA	Luan
14	MF	BRA	Gustavo Scarpa
15	DF	PAR	Gustavo Gómez
16	DF	BRA	Lucas Esteves
17	DF	URU	Matías Viña
18	MF	BRA	~~Ramires~~
19	FW	BRA	Breno Lopes (Note: Replaced Bruno Henrique)
20	MF	BRA	Lucas Lima
21	FW	BRA	Wesley
22	GK	BRA	Jailson
23	MF	BRA	Raphael Veiga
24	GK	BRA	Vinícius Silvestre
25	MF	BRA	Gabriel Menino

No.	Pos.	Nation	Player
26	DF	BRA	Renan (Note: Replaced Victor Luis)
27	FW	BRA	Gabriel Veron
28	MF	BRA	Danilo (Note: Replaced Alan)
29	FW	BRA	Willian
30	MF	BRA	Felipe Melo
31	GK	BRA	Mateus
32	DF	BRA	Garcia
33	DF	BRA	Jhow
34	MF	BRA	Ramon Cirino
35	MF	BRA	Jonathan
36	FW	BRA	Vitinho
37	MF	ECU	Érick Plúas
38	FW	BRA	Marcelinho
39	FW	BRA	Giovani
40	FW	BRA	João Pedro
41	GK	BRA	Lucas Bergantin
42	DF	BRA	Vanderlan
43	MF	BRA	Fabinho
44	GK	BRA	Bruno Carcaioli
45	MF	BRA	Adriano Juninho
46	GK	BRA	Leandro (Note: Replaced Ramon Rocha)
47	FW	BRA	Ruan Ribeiro
48	FW	PAR	Aníbal Vega (Note: Replaced Pedro Lima)
49	FW	BRA	Fabrício
50	MF	BRA	Luis Guilherme

Notes

Source: UOL, ge and Lance!

== Transfers ==
=== Transfers in ===
Pos.	Player	Transferred from	Fee/notes	Date	Source
MF	(Brazil) Gabriel Menino	(Brazil) Palmeiras Academy	Promoted to the first team	25 November 2019	
MF	(Brazil) Patrick de Paula	(Brazil) Palmeiras Academy	Promoted to the first team	25 November 2019	
GK	(Brazil) Vinícius Silvestre	(Brazil) CRB	Loan return	25 November 2019	
DF	(Brazil) Pedrão	(Brazil) América Mineiro	Loan return	25 November 2019	
FW	(Brazil) Artur	(Brazil) Bahia	Loan return	25 November 2019	
DF	(Brazil) Lucas Esteves	(Brazil) Palmeiras Academy	Promoted to the first team	25 November 2019	
MF	(Brazil) Alan	(Brazil) Palmeiras Academy	Promoted to the first team	24 December 2019	
DF	(Brazil) Emerson Santos	(Brazil) Internacional	Loan return	1 January 2020	
FW	(Brazil) Wesley	(Brazil) Vitória	Loan return	3 January 2020	
DF	(Uruguay) Matías Viña	(Uruguay) Nacional	Signed	31 January 2020	
FW	(Brazil) Rony	(Brazil) Athletico Paranaense	Signed	21 February 2020	
FW	(Colombia) Iván Angulo	(Brazil) Cruzeiro	Loan return	28 July 2020	
MF	(Brazil) Danilo	(Brazil) Palmeiras Academy	Signed	10 September 2020	
DF	(Chile) Benjamín Kuscevic	(Chile) Universidad Católica	Signed	4 November 2020	
DF	(Brazil) Alan Empereur	(Italy) Verona	Loan with an option to buy	9 November 2020	
FW	(Brazil) Breno Lopes	(Brazil) Juventude	Signed	11 November 2020	

=== Transfers out ===
Pos.	Player	Transferred to	Fee/notes	Date	Source
MF	(Brazil) Thiago Santos	(United States) FC Dallas	Signed	5 December 2019	
GK	(Brazil) Fernando Prass		Contract ended	7 December 2019	
DF	(Brazil) Edu Dracena		Retired	8 December 2019	
FW	(Brazil) Henrique Dourado	(China) Henan Jianye	Loan return	9 December 2019	
DF	(Brazil) Antônio Carlos	(United States) Orlando City	Loan	17 December 2019	
FW	(Colombia) Miguel Borja	(Colombia) Junior	Loan	28 December 2019	
FW	(Brazil) Carlos Eduardo	(Brazil) Athletico Paranaense	Loan	7 January 2020	
FW	(Brazil) Artur	(Brazil) Red Bull Bragantino	≅R$25,000,000	8 January 2020	
MF	(Brazil) Hyoran	(Brazil) Atlético Mineiro	Loan	8 January 2020	
FW	(Brazil) Deyverson	(Spain) Getafe	Loan	17 January 2020	
MF	(Brazil) Matheus Fernandes	(Spain) Barcelona	€7,000,000	31 January 2020	
MF	(Brazil) Jean	(Brazil) Cruzeiro	Loan	2 March 2020	
FW	(Colombia) Iván Angulo	(Brazil) Cruzeiro	Loan	16 March 2020	
FW	(Brazil) Dudu	(Qatar) Al-Duhail	Loan with an option to buy	9 July 2020	
DF	(Brazil) Victor Luis	(Brazil) Botafogo	Loan	21 July 2020	
DF	(Brazil) Pedrão	(Portugal) Nacional	Loan	7 August 2020	
MF	(Brazil) Alan	(Brazil) Guarani	Loan	28 August 2020	
DF	(Brazil) Diogo Barbosa	(Brazil) Grêmio	Signed	11 September 2020	
DF	(Brazil) Vitor Hugo	(Turkey) Trabzonspor	≅R$20,000,000	5 October 2020	
MF	(Brazil) Bruno Henrique	(Saudi Arabia) Al-Ittihad	≅R$27,000,000	12 October 2020	
FW	(Colombia) Iván Angulo	(Brazil) Botafogo	Loan	24 October 2020	
MF	(Brazil) Ramires		Released	27 November 2020	

== Competitions ==
=== Overview ===
Competition	First match	Last match	Starting round	Final position	Record							
Competition	First match	Last match	Starting round	Final position	Pld	W	D	L	GF	GA	GD	Win %
Série A	12 August 2020	25 February 2021	Matchday 1	7th	38	15	13	10	51	37	+14	39.47
Copa do Brasil	29 October 2020	7 March 2021	Round of 16	Winners	8	6	2	0	15	4	+11	75.00
Campeonato Paulista	22 January 2020	8 August 2020	Matchday 1	Winners	16	8	6	2	21	7	+14	50.00
Copa Libertadores	4 March 2020	30 January 2021	Group stage	Winners	13	10	2	1	33	6	+27	76.92
FIFA Club World Cup	7 February 2021	11 February 2021	Semi-finals	Fourth place	2	0	1	1	0	1	−1	0.00
Total					77	39	24	14	120	55	+65	50.65

Source: Competitions

=== Florida Cup ===
15 January 2020	Palmeiras (Brazil)	0–0 (10–9 p)	(Colombia) Atlético Nacional	Orlando, United States
22:30 UTC−3	Marcos Rocha (yellow card) 16'; Gómez (yellow card) 33'	Report	Duque (yellow card) 69'	Stadium: Exploria Stadium; Referee: Elvis Osmanovic (United States)
	Penalties
	Victor Luis (penalty scored); Luan (penalty scored); Alan (penalty scored); Menino (penalty scored); Willian (penalty scored); Emerson Santos (penalty scored); Wesley (penalty scored); Ramires (penalty scored); Mayke (penalty scored); Veron (penalty scored)		(penalty scored) Duque; (penalty scored) Candelo; (penalty scored) Quiñones; (penalty scored) Rovira; (penalty scored) Barrera; (penalty scored) Blanco; (penalty scored) Yabur; (penalty scored) Córdoba; (penalty scored) Cuadrado; (penalty missed) Velásquez

18 January 2020	New York City FC (United States)	1–2	(Brazil) Palmeiras	Orlando, United States
16:00 UTC−3	Jasson (yellow card) 25'; De Rosario 45+1'; Haak (yellow card) 68'	Report	Menino (yellow card) 31'; Raphael Veiga (yellow card) 37'; Felipe Melo (yellow card) 50'; Lucas Lima 55'; Zé Rafael (yellow card) 66'; Willian 72'	Stadium: Exploria Stadium; Referee: Jonathan Bilinski (United States)

=== Campeonato Paulista ===
==== First stage ====
Palmeiras were drawn into Group B. On 16 March 2020, it was announced that the tournament had been postponed due to COVID-19 pandemic. On 16 July, the return of the competition was announced by the Federação Paulista de Futebol.

Pos	Team	Pld	W	D	L	GF	GA	GD	Pts	Qualification or relegation
1	Palmeiras	12	6	4	2	17	6	+11	22	Knockout stage
2	Santo André	12	6	2	4	14	13	+1	20	Knockout stage
3	Novorizontino	12	4	7	1	12	8	+4	19	
4	Botafogo	12	3	2	7	9	23	−14	11	

Source: Soccerway

22 January 2020 1	Ituano	0–4	Palmeiras	Itu
19:15 UTC−3	Jonas (yellow card) 35'; Paulinho Dias (yellow card) 41'	Report	Marcos Rocha 51', (yellow card) 80'; Lucas Lima 57'; Victor Luis (yellow card) 72'; Zé Rafael 73'; Willian 78'	Stadium: Novelli Júnior; Attendance: 8,049; Referee: Flávio Rodrigues de Souza

26 January 2020 2	Palmeiras	0–0	São Paulo	Araraquara
16:00 UTC−3		Report	Vitor Bueno (yellow card) 53'; Bruno Alves (yellow card) 86'	Stadium: Arena da Fonte; Attendance: 15,173; Referee: Raphael Claus

29 January 2020 3	Palmeiras	4–0	Oeste	São Paulo
19:15 UTC−3	Gustavo Scarpa 36' (pen.); Willian 58', 65', 79'; Zé Rafael (yellow card) 90+1'	Report	Bruno Bispo (yellow card) 58'; Marlon (yellow card) 71'; Éder Sciola (yellow card) 90'	Stadium: Pacaembu; Attendance: 14,748; Referee: Edina Alves Batista

2 February 2020 4	Red Bull Bragantino	2–1	Palmeiras	Bragança Paulista
16:00 UTC−3	Uillian Correia 33'; Ytalo 49' (pen.); Aderlan (yellow card) 62'; Matheus Jesus (yellow card) 68'; Edimar (yellow card) 77'	Report	Wesley (yellow card) 29'; Gómez (yellow card) 39'; Dudu 78' (pen.)	Stadium: Nabi Abi Chedid; Attendance: 9,866; Referee: Thiago Duarte Peixoto

8 February 2020 5	Ponte Preta	0–1	Palmeiras	Campinas
19:30 UTC−3	Mateus Anderson (yellow card) 37'; João Paulo (yellow card) 42' (yellow-red card) 90+4'; Apodi (yellow card) 61'; Wellington Carvalho (yellow card) 78'	Report	Willian 32'; Dudu (yellow card) 46' (yellow-red card) 90+3'; Felipe Melo (yellow card) 78'	Stadium: Moisés Lucarelli; Attendance: 4,171; Referee: Douglas Marques das Flores

16 February 2020 6	Palmeiras	3–1	Mirassol	São Paulo
16:00 UTC−3	Gómez (yellow card) 40', (goal) 68'; Raphael Veiga 73'; Luiz Adriano 76'; Felipe Melo (yellow card) 84'	Report	Rafael Silva (yellow card) 4', (goal) 59'; Neto Moura (yellow card) 44'; Kewin (yellow card) 72'	Stadium: Allianz Parque; Attendance: 26,538; Referee: Salim Fende Chavez

20 February 2020 7	Palmeiras	1–0	Guarani	São Paulo
21:30 UTC−3	Dudu 26'	Report	Igor Henrique (yellow card) 28'; Deivid (yellow card) 68'; Giovanny (yellow card) 74'	Stadium: Allianz Parque; Attendance: 19,086; Referee: Vinicius Furlan

29 February 2020 8	Santos	0–0	Palmeiras	São Paulo
16:00 UTC−3	Felipe Jonatan (yellow card) 23'; Sánchez (yellow card) 59'; Lucas Veríssimo (yellow card) 67'	Report	Felipe Melo (yellow card) 30'	Stadium: Pacaembu; Attendance: 20,371; Referee: Flávio Rodrigues de Souza

7 March 2020 9	Palmeiras	1–1	Ferroviária	São Paulo
17:00 UTC−3	Patrick (yellow card) 18'; Rony (yellow card) 52'; Willian 56'; Luan (yellow card) 73'; Gómez (yellow card) 73'	Report	Élton (yellow card) 60'; Tony 77'	Stadium: Allianz Parque; Attendance: 27,467; Referee: Douglas Marques das Flores

14 March 2020 10	Inter de Limeira	0–0	Palmeiras	Limeira
16:30 UTC−3	Airton (yellow card) 2' (red card) 52'; Murilo Rangel (yellow card) 58'	Report	Ramires (yellow card) 1'; Marcos Rocha (yellow card) 26' (yellow-red card) 90+4'; Felipe Melo (yellow card) 35'; Bruno Henrique (yellow card) 38'; Lucas Lima (yellow card) 90+1'	Stadium: Major José Levy Sobrinho; Attendance: 13,761; Referee: Vinicius Furlan

22 July 2020 11	Corinthians	1–0	Palmeiras	São Paulo
21:30 UTC−3	Gil 14'	Report	Mayke (yellow card) 50'; Patrick (yellow card) 63'	Stadium: Arena Corinthians; Attendance: 0 Referee: Raphael Claus
Note: Originally this match would be played on March 22 but was postponed due to COVID-19 pandemic in Brazil.

26 July 2020 12	Palmeiras	2–1	Água Santa	São Paulo
16:00 UTC−3	Raphael Veiga (yellow card) 42'; Ramires 71', (yellow card) 74'; Luiz Adriano 87'	Report	Uéderson (yellow card) 54'; Lucas Silva 62'; Thomazella (yellow card) 65'; Giovanni (yellow card) 80'	Stadium: Allianz Parque; Attendance: 0 Referee: Douglas Marques das Flores
Note: The match was originally scheduled for 1 April 2020, but was postponed due to COVID-19 pandemic in Brazil.

==== Quarter-final ====
29 July 2020	Palmeiras	2–0	Santo André	São Paulo
21:30 UTC−3	Rony (yellow card) 23'; Gabriel Menino (yellow card) 33'; Felipe Melo 87', (yellow card) 89'; Marcos Rocha 90+3'	Report	Ramon (yellow card) 14'; Rafhael Lucas (yellow card) 88'	Stadium: Allianz Parque; Attendance: 0 Referee: Luiz Flávio de Oliveira

==== Semi-final ====
2 August 2020	Palmeiras	1–0	Ponte Preta	São Paulo
19:00 UTC−3	Felipe Melo (yellow card) 32'; Patrick 45'	Report	Guilherme Lazaroni (yellow card) 35'; Henrique Trevisan (yellow card) 66'; Danrley (yellow card) 70'; João Paulo (yellow card) 89'	Stadium: Allianz Parque; Attendance: 0 Referee: Flávio Rodrigues de Souza

==== Finals ====
5 August 2020 First leg	Corinthians	0–0	Palmeiras	São Paulo
21:30 UTC−3	Mateus Vital (yellow card) 42'; Avelar (yellow card) 68'; Jô (yellow card) 77'; Ramiro (yellow card) 89'	Report	Rony (yellow card) 42'	Stadium: Arena Corinthians; Attendance: 0 Referee: Raphael Claus

8 August 2020 Second leg	Palmeiras	1–1 (1–1 agg.) (4–3 p)	Corinthians	São Paulo
16:30 UTC−3	Luiz Adriano 48'; Patrick (yellow card) 63'; Rony (yellow card) 69'; Lucas Lima (yellow card) 90'	Report	Gabriel (yellow card) 12'; Gil (yellow card) 54'; Cantillo (yellow card) 89'; Jô 90+5' (pen.)	Stadium: Allianz Parque; Attendance: 0 Referee: Luiz Flávio de Oliveira
	Penalties
	Bruno Henrique (penalty missed); Raphael Veiga (penalty scored); Scarpa (penalty scored); Lucas Lima (penalty scored); Patrick (penalty scored)		(penalty missed) Michel; (penalty scored) Abelar; (penalty missed) Cantillo; (penalty scored) Sidcley; (penalty scored) Jô

=== Copa Libertadores ===
==== Group stage ====
The draw for the qualifying stages and group stage was held on 17 December 2019, 20:30 PYST (UTC−3), at the CONMEBOL Convention Centre in Luque, Paraguay.

On 12 March 2020, CONMEBOL announced that the tournament would be temporarily suspended after matchday 2 due to the COVID-19 pandemic, with matches on matchday 3, originally scheduled for 17–19 March 2020, postponed to a later date to be confirmed. On 18 March 2020, CONMEBOL announced that the tournament would be suspended until 5 May 2020. On 17 April 2020, CONMEBOL announced that the tournament would be suspended indefinitely, and no date had been set for its resumption. On 10 July 2020, CONMEBOL announced the new schedule for the remainder of the competition.

Pos	Team	Pld	W	D	L	GF	GA	GD	Pts	Qualification
1	(Brazil) Palmeiras	6	5	1	0	17	2	+15	16	Round of 16
2	(Paraguay) Guaraní	6	4	1	1	13	7	+6	13	Round of 16
3	(Bolivia) Bolívar	6	1	1	4	6	13	−7	4	Copa Sudamericana
4	(Argentina) Tigre	6	0	1	5	3	17	−14	1	

Source: CONMEBOL
Rules for classification: 1) Points; 2) Goal difference; 3) Goals scored; 4) Away goals scored; 5) CONMEBOL ranking.

4 March 2020 1	Tigre (Argentina)	0–2	(Brazil) Palmeiras	Victoria, Argentina
19:15 UTC−3	Melivilo (yellow card) 41'; Acuña (red card) 61'; Rodríguez (yellow card) 80'	Report	Luiz Adriano 16'; Rony (yellow card) 60'; Willian 65'; Gabriel Menino (yellow card) 67'	Stadium: Estadio José Dellagiovanna; Referee: Wilmar Roldán (Colombia)

10 March 2020 2	Palmeiras (Brazil)	3–1	(Paraguay) Guaraní	São Paulo, Brazil
21:30 UTC−3	Marcos Rocha (yellow card) 25'; Gómez (yellow card) 44'; Luiz Adriano 53', 73', 82'	Report	Morel (yellow card) 27'; Fernández (yellow card) 52'; Benítez (yellow card) 55'; Báez (yellow card) 81'; Merlini (yellow card) 84'; Bobadilla 88'	Stadium: Allianz Parque; Attendance: 28,267; Referee: Roberto Tobar (Chile)

16 September 2020 3	Bolívar (Bolivia)	1–2	(Brazil) Palmeiras	La Paz, Bolivia
21:30 UTC−3	Riquelme 67'	Report	Willian 34' (pen.); Zé Rafael (yellow card) 36'; Gabriel Menino (yellow card) 44', (goal) 60'; Bruno Henrique (yellow card) 72'; Danilo (yellow card) 90'	Stadium: Estadio Hernando Siles; Attendance: 0 Referee: Piero Maza (Chile)
Note: The match was originally scheduled for 18 March 2020.

23 September 2020 4	Guaraní (Paraguay)	0–0	(Brazil) Palmeiras	Asunción, Paraguay
21:30 UTC−3	Morel (yellow card) 60'; Romaña (yellow card) 70'	Report	Wesley (yellow card) 73'	Stadium: Estadio Defensores del Chaco; Attendance: 0 Referee: Néstor Pitana (Argentina)
Note: The match was originally scheduled for 8 April 2020.

30 September 2020 5	Palmeiras (Brazil)	5–0	(Bolivia) Bolívar	São Paulo, Brazil
19:15 UTC−3	Willian 3'; Gómez (yellow card) 29'; Wesley 47'; Viña 59'; Raphael Veiga 61'; Rony 64'	Report	Fernández (yellow card) 58'	Stadium: Allianz Parque; Attendance: 0 Referee: Leodán González (Uruguay)
Note: The match was originally scheduled for 22 April 2020.

21 October 2020 6	Palmeiras (Brazil)	5–0	(Argentina) Tigre	São Paulo, Brazil
21:30 UTC−3	Viña (yellow card) 1'; Raphael Veiga 34'; Zé Rafael (yellow card) 42', (goal) 66'; Gómez 54'; Gabriel Veron 75'; Rony 81'	Report	Melivilo (yellow card) 24'; Leizza (yellow card) 31'; Kestler (yellow card) 74'; Cardozo (yellow card) 88'	Stadium: Allianz Parque; Attendance: 0 Referee: Esteban Ostojich (Uruguay)
Note: The match was originally scheduled for 6 May 2020.

==== Round of 16 ====
The draw for the round of 16 was held on 23 October 2020, 12:00 PYT (UTC−3).

25 November 2020 First leg	Delfín (Ecuador)	1–3	(Brazil) Palmeiras	Manta, Ecuador
19:15 UTC−3	Nazareno (yellow card) 34'; González (yellow card) 57'; Ramires 69' (o.g.); Garcés (yellow card) 90+3'	Report	Gabriel Menino 18'; Rony 36' (pen.); Patrick (yellow card) 45'; Ramires (yellow card) 58'; Zé Rafael 60'	Stadium: Estadio Jocay; Attendance: 0 Referee: Leodán González (Uruguay)

2 December 2020 Second leg	Palmeiras (Brazil)	5–0 (8–1 agg.)	(Ecuador) Delfín	São Paulo, Brazil
19:15 UTC−3	Patrick 29', (yellow card) 37'; Gabriel Veron 49', 60'; Willian 52'; Danilo 90+4'	Report	Cangá (yellow card) 64'; Rojas (yellow card) 68'	Stadium: Allianz Parque; Attendance: 0 Referee: Darío Herrera (Argentina)

==== Quarterfinal ====
8 December 2020 First leg	Libertad (Paraguay)	1–1	(Brazil) Palmeiras	Asunción, Paraguay
21:30 UTC−3	Campuzano (yellow card) 44'; Cáceres (yellow card) 45'; Espinoza 62'; Cardozo (yellow card) 80'	Report	Zé Rafael (yellow card) 30'; Gómez 39'; Raphael Veiga (yellow card) 47'; Gabriel Menino (yellow card) 66'; Lucas Lima (yellow card) 84' (yellow-red card) 90+6'	Stadium: Estadio Defensores del Chaco; Attendance: 0 Referee: Fernando Rapallini (Argentina)

15 December 2020 Second leg	Palmeiras (Brazil)	3–0 (4–1 agg.)	(Paraguay) Libertad	São Paulo, Brazil
21:30 UTC−3	Gustavo Scarpa 21'; Rony 68'; Gabriel Menino 82'	Report	Adorno (yellow card) 6'; Cáceres (yellow card) 60'; Piris (red card) 64'; Ferreira (yellow card) 66'	Stadium: Allianz Parque; Attendance: 0 Referee: Jesús Valenzuela (Venezuela)

==== Semifinal ====
5 January 2021 First leg	River Plate (Argentina)	0–3	(Brazil) Palmeiras	Avellaneda, Argentina
21:30 UTC−3	Carrascal (red card) 60'; Borré (yellow card) 63'; Ponzio (yellow card) 77'; De La Cruz (yellow card) 90+4'	Report	Rony 27'; Gómez (yellow card) 30'; Patrick (yellow card) 43'; Luiz Adriano 47'; Danilo (yellow card) 49'; Viña 62'; Emerson Santos (yellow card) 81'	Stadium: Estadio Libertadores de América; Attendance: 0 Referee: Leodán González (Uruguay)

12 January 2021 Second leg	Palmeiras (Brazil)	0–2 (3–2 agg.)	(Argentina) River Plate	São Paulo, Brazil
21:30 UTC−3	Danilo (yellow card) 19'; Empereur (yellow card) 40'; Luan (yellow card) 50'; Marcos Rocha (yellow card) 71'; Weverton (yellow card) 87'	Report	Díaz (yellow card) 17'; Rojas 29', (yellow card) 62' (yellow-red card) 73'; Borré 44', (yellow card) 75'	Stadium: Allianz Parque; Attendance: 0 Referee: Esteban Ostojich (Uruguay)

==== Final ====
30 January 2021	Palmeiras (Brazil)	1–0	(Brazil) Santos	Rio de Janeiro, Brazil
17:00 UTC−3	Gómez (yellow card) 35'; Viña (yellow card) 58'; Marcos Rocha (yellow card) 90+7'; Breno Lopes 90+9', (yellow card) 90+9'	Report	Lucas Veríssimo (yellow card) 10'; Soteldo (yellow card) 90+6'; Alison (yellow card) 90+13'	Stadium: Maracanã; Attendance: 10,000; Referee: Patricio Loustau (Argentina)

=== Série A ===
==== Standings ====
Pos	Team	Pld	W	D	L	GF	GA	GD	Pts	Qualification or relegation
5	Fluminense	38	18	10	10	55	42	+13	64	Qualification for Copa Libertadores group stage
6	Grêmio	38	14	17	7	53	40	+13	59	Qualification for Copa Libertadores second stage
7	Palmeiras	38	15	13	10	51	37	+14	58	Qualification for Copa Libertadores group stage (Note: Palmeiras qualified for the Copa Libertadores group stage by winning the 2020 Copa Libertadores and the 2020 Copa do Brasil.)
8	Santos	38	14	12	12	52	51	+1	54	Qualification for Copa Libertadores second stage
9	Athletico Paranaense	38	15	8	15	38	36	+2	53	Qualification for Copa Sudamericana group stage

Source: CBF
Rules for classification: 1) points; 2) wins; 3) goal difference; 4) goals scored; 5) head-to-head results (only between 2 teams); 6) fewest red cards; 7) fewest yellow cards; 8) draw.

==== Result by round ====
Round	1	2	3	4	5	6	7	8	9	10	11	12	13	14	15	16	17	18	19	20	21	22	23	24	25	26	27	28	29	30	31	32	33	34	35	36	37	38
Result	D	D	D	W	W	D	D	W	W	D	D	D	W	L	L	L	L	W	W	W	W	L	W	D	W	L	W	W	W	D	L	L	D	D	L	W	D	L
Position	5	12	13	9	5	6	8	6	4	6	4	4	3	5	7	7	8	7	7	6	5	5	5	7	4	6	6	5	6	6	5	5	6	6	6	6	7	7

Source: CBF
W = Win; D = Draw; L = Loss

==== Matches ====
The schedule was released on 27 February 2020. Due to COVID-19 pandemic in Brazil the tournament was rescheduled, starting on 8 August 2020 and concluding on 25 February 2021.

12 August 2020 2	Fluminense	1–1	Palmeiras	Rio de Janeiro
21:30 UTC−3	Fred (yellow card) 15'; Evanilson 38', (yellow card) 65'; Wellington Silva (yellow card) 77'	Report	Luiz Adriano 14'; Luan (yellow card) 28'; Rony (yellow card) 50'; Gustavo Scarpa (yellow card) 90+4'	Stadium: Maracanã; Attendance: 0 Referee: Rafael Traci (Santa Catarina)

15 August 2020 3	Palmeiras	1–1	Goiás	São Paulo
21:30 UTC−3	Gómez 17'; Lucas Lima (yellow card) 90'	Report	Rafael Vaz 39'; Pintado (yellow card) 40'; Luiz Gustavo (yellow card) 62'; Daniel Bessa (yellow card) 85'	Stadium: Allianz Parque; Attendance: 0 Referee: Paulo Roberto Alves Júnior (Paraná)

19 August 2020 4	Athletico Paranaense	0–1	Palmeiras	Curitiba
19:30 UTC−3	Khellven (yellow card) 24'; Wellington (yellow card) 33'; Vitinho (yellow card) 58'; Fernando Canesin (yellow card) 85'; Thiago Heleno (yellow card) 90+4'	Report	Raphael Veiga 90+1'	Stadium: Arena da Baixada; Attendance: 0 Referee: Caio Max Augusto Vieira (Rio Grande do Norte)

23 August 2020 5	Palmeiras	2–1	Santos	São Paulo
16:00 UTC−3	Luiz Adriano (yellow card) 15', (goal) 45' (pen.); Bruno Henrique (yellow card) 35'; Rony (yellow card) 45+1'; Ramires (yellow card) 62'; Patrick 72'; Gabriel Silva (yellow card) 90+5'	Report	Felipe Jonatan (yellow card) 28'; Diego Pituca (yellow card) 38'; Alison (yellow card) 43' (yellow-red card) 90+1'; Ramires 47' (o.g.)	Stadium: Morumbi; Attendance: 0 Referee: Vinicius Gonçalves Dias Araújo (São Paulo)

29 August 2020 6	Bahia	1–1	Palmeiras	Salvador
19:00 UTC−3	Gregore (yellow card) 10'; Rossi (yellow card) 45+1'; Marco Antônio 90+4'	Report	Lucas Lima (yellow card) 13'; Zé Rafael 76'; Ramires (yellow card) 90+1'; Luan (yellow card) 90+2'; Wesley (yellow card) 90+3'	Stadium: Pituaçu; Attendance: 0 Referee: Bruno Arleu de Araújo (Rio de Janeiro)

2 September 2020 7	Palmeiras	1–1	Internacional	São Paulo
21:30 UTC−3	Zé Rafael (yellow card) 26'; Luan (yellow card) 39'; Lucas Lima (yellow card) 40'; Luiz Adriano 90+3'	Report	Rodrigo Moledo (yellow card) 22'; Praxedes (yellow card) 45'; Nonato (yellow card) 66'; Cuesta (yellow card) 77'; Matheus Jussa (yellow card) 82'; Thiago Galhardo 90+1' (pen.)	Stadium: Allianz Parque; Attendance: 0 Referee: Wilton Pereira Sampaio (Goiás)

6 September 2020 8	Red Bull Bragantino	1–2	Palmeiras	Bragança Paulista
11:00 UTC−3	Ricardo Ryller (yellow card) 21'; Claudinho 53'; Morato (red card) 90+8'	Report	Gómez (yellow card) 29'; Gabriel Veron 68'; Willian 90+3'; Vitor Hugo (yellow card) 90+6'; Danilo (yellow card) 90+7'	Stadium: Nabi Abi Chedid; Attendance: 0 Referee: Rodrigo Carvalhaes de Miranda (Rio de Janeiro)

10 September 2020 9	Corinthians	0–2	Palmeiras	São Paulo
19:15 UTC−3	Ramiro (yellow card) 35'; Fagner (red card) 41'; Otero (yellow card) 68'; Danilo Avelar (yellow card) 80' (yellow-red card) 85'	Report	Luiz Adriano 42' (pen.); Mayke (yellow card) 59'; Gabriel Veron 64'; Zé Rafael (yellow card) 79'	Stadium: Arena Corinthians; Attendance: 0 Referee: Leandro Vuaden (Rio Grande do Sul)

13 September 2020 10	Palmeiras	2–2	Sport	São Paulo
19:45 UTC−3	Ramires (yellow card) 7'; Willian 28'; Zé Rafael 41', (yellow card) 53' (yellow-red card) 58'	Report	Iago Maidana 11' (pen.); Ronaldo Henrique (yellow card) 17'; Sander (red card) 45'; Rogério (yellow card) 63'; Lucas Mugni 63'; Marquinhos (yellow card) 81'	Stadium: Allianz Parque; Attendance: 0 Referee: Diego Pombo Lopez (Bahia)

20 September 2020 11	Grêmio	1–1	Palmeiras	Porto Alegre
16:00 UTC−3	Victor Ferraz (yellow card) 21'; Alisson (yellow card) 89'; Ferreira 90+1'	Report	Gabriel Menino (yellow card) 13'; Felipe Melo (yellow card) 48'; Raphael Veiga 70'; Viña (yellow card) 81'	Stadium: Arena do Grêmio; Attendance: 0 Referee: Rodrigo D'Alonso Ferreira (Santa Catarina)

27 September 2020 12	Palmeiras	1–1	Flamengo	São Paulo
16:00 UTC−3	Gabriel Menino (yellow card) 42'; Felipe Melo (yellow card) 45+3'; Lucas Lima (yellow card) 50'; Patrick 54'; Zé Rafael (yellow card) 66'	Report	Guilherme Bala (yellow card) 45+2'; Pedro 55'; João Lucas (yellow card) 65'	Stadium: Allianz Parque; Attendance: 0 Referee: Jean Pierre Gonçalves Lima (Rio Grande do Sul)

3 October 2020 13	Palmeiras	2–1	Ceará	São Paulo
19:00 UTC−3	Raphael Veiga 9'; Willian 81'; Danilo (yellow card) 82'	Report	Alyson (yellow card) 5'; Eduardo Brock 16'; Charles (yellow card) 64'; Vitor Jacaré (yellow card) 77'; Fernando Prass (yellow card) 82'	Stadium: Allianz Parque; Attendance: 0 Referee: Bruno Arleu de Araújo (Rio de Janeiro)

7 October 2020 14	Botafogo	2–1	Palmeiras	Rio de Janeiro
21:30 UTC−3	Pedro Raúl 46'; Caio Alexandre 52'; Guilherme Santos (yellow card) 71'; Diego Cavalieri (yellow card) 81'; Matheus Babi (yellow card) 89'; Warley (yellow card) 90+4'	Report	Wesley (yellow card) 43'; Jailson (yellow card) 55'; Marcos Rocha (yellow card) 70'; Lucas Lima (yellow card) 74'; Willian 76'	Stadium: Nilton Santos; Attendance: 0 Referee: Rodolpho Toski Marques (Paraná)

10 October 2020 15	Palmeiras	0–2	São Paulo	São Paulo
19:00 UTC−3	Lucas Esteves (yellow card) 47'; Patrick (yellow card) 85'	Report	Igor Vinícius (yellow card) 46'; Reinaldo 55' (pen.); Vitor Bueno 90+2'	Stadium: Allianz Parque; Attendance: 0 Referee: Leandro Vuaden (Rio Grande do Sul)

14 October 2020 16	Palmeiras	1–3	Coritiba	São Paulo
18:00 UTC−3	Zé Rafael (yellow card) 20'; Gabriel Veron 37', (yellow card) 90+1'; Felipe Melo (yellow card) 52'	Report	Yan Sasse (yellow card) 2'; Robson 7', 23'; Giovanni Augusto 64'; Sabino (yellow card) 90+2'	Stadium: Allianz Parque; Attendance: 0 Referee: Jefferson Ferreira de Moraes (Goiás)

18 October 2020 17	Fortaleza	2–0	Palmeiras	Fortaleza
20:30 UTC−3	David 34', 40'; Bruno Melo (yellow card) 45+3'; Paulão (yellow card) 52'	Report	Zé Rafael (yellow card) 63'; Viña (yellow card) 80'; Gómez (yellow card) 90+1' (red card) 90+1'	Stadium: Castelão; Attendance: 0 Referee: Marcelo de Lima Henrique (Rio de Janeiro)

25 October 2020 18	Atlético Goianiense	0–3	Palmeiras	Goiânia
16:00 UTC−3	Janderson (yellow card) 58'	Report	Wesley 19'; Luan (yellow card) 44'; Raphael Veiga (yellow card) 52'; Luiz Adriano 54', 63'; Rony (yellow card) 81'; Gustavo Scarpa (yellow card) 87'	Stadium: Olímpico; Attendance: 0 Referee: Sávio Pereira Sampaio (Distrito Federal)

2 November 2020 19	Palmeiras	3–0	Atlético Mineiro	São Paulo
17:00 UTC−3	Raphael Veiga 18'; Gabriel Menino (yellow card) 51'; Felipe Melo (yellow card) 59'; Rony 69'; Wesley 76'	Report	Savarino (yellow card) 43'	Stadium: Allianz Parque; Attendance: 0 Referee: Bráulio da Silva Machado (Santa Catarina)

8 November 2020 20	Vasco	0–1	Palmeiras	Rio de Janeiro
16:00 UTC−3	Léo Matos (yellow card) 37'	Report	Gómez (yellow card) 3'; Luiz Adriano 72'; Viña (yellow card) 88'; Lucas Lima (yellow card) 90+2'	Stadium: São Januário; Attendance: 0 Referee: Anderson Daronco (Rio Grande do Sul)

14 November 2020 21	Palmeiras	2–0	Fluminense	São Paulo
21:30 UTC−3	Emerson Santos (yellow card) 11'; Zé Rafael (yellow card) 42'; Raphael Veiga 51' (pen.), 59'	Report	Wellington Silva (yellow card) 50'; Araújo (yellow card) 52'	Stadium: Allianz Parque; Attendance: 0 Referee: Leandro Vuaden (Rio Grande do Sul)

21 November 2020 22	Goiás	1–0	Palmeiras	Goiânia
21:00 UTC−3	Miguel Figueira (yellow card) 81', (goal) 90+2'; Rafael Moura (yellow card) 90+2'	Report	Renan (yellow card) 4'; Mayke (red card) 38'; Gabriel Menino (yellow card) 49'	Stadium: Serrinha; Attendance: 0 Referee: Bruno Arleu de Araújo (Rio de Janeiro)

28 November 2020 23	Palmeiras	3–0	Athletico Paranaense	São Paulo
17:00 UTC−3	Patrick 7'; Rony 34', 59'; Danilo (yellow card) 48'; Gabriel Menino (yellow card) 66'	Report	Christian (yellow card) 70'	Stadium: Allianz Parque; Attendance: 0 Referee: Anderson Daronco (Rio Grande do Sul)

5 December 2020 24	Santos	2–2	Palmeiras	Santos
17:00 UTC−3	Soteldo (yellow card) 21'; Diego Pituca 37', (yellow card) 85'; Lucas Veríssimo (yellow card) 53'; Marinho 70'	Report	Raphael Veiga 54' (pen.); Lucas Lima (yellow card) 58'; Willian 62'; Emerson Santos (yellow card) 66'; Mayke (yellow card) 72'; Zé Rafael (red card) 90+3'	Stadium: Vila Belmiro; Attendance: 0 Referee: Flávio Rodrigues de Souza (São Paulo)

12 December 2020 25	Palmeiras	3–0	Bahia	São Paulo
19:00 UTC−3	Willian 5'; Raphael Veiga 35' (pen.); Rony 42'; Empereur (yellow card) 63'; Marcos Rocha (yellow card) 78'	Report	Ramírez (yellow card) 62'; Clayson (yellow card) 65'; Gregore (yellow card) 77'	Stadium: Allianz Parque; Attendance: 0 Referee: Rafael Traci (Santa Catarina)

19 December 2020 26	Internacional	2–0	Palmeiras	Porto Alegre
21:00 UTC−3	Edenílson 10'; Caio (yellow card) 23'; Thiago Galhardo (yellow card) 70'; Marcelo Lomba (yellow card) 76'; Rodrigo Moledo (yellow card) 81'; Yuri Alberto 82'	Report	Willian (yellow card) 24'; Gabriel Menino (yellow card) 26'	Stadium: Estádio Beira-Rio; Attendance: 0 Referee: Sávio Pereira Sampaio (Distrito Federal)

27 December 2020 27	Palmeiras	1–0	Red Bull Bragantino	São Paulo
18:15 UTC−3	Luiz Adriano 27', (yellow card) 44'; Gabriel Menino (yellow card) 78'; Raphael Veiga (yellow card) 88'	Report		Stadium: Allianz Parque; Attendance: 0 Referee: Raphael Claus (São Paulo)

9 January 2021 29	Sport	0–1	Palmeiras	Recife
19:00 UTC−3	Rafael Thyere (yellow card) 38'; Thiago Neves (yellow card) 53'; Marcão (yellow card) 74'; Ricardinho (yellow card) 90+6'; Betinho (yellow card) 90+9'	Report	Willian 27'; Lucas Lima (yellow card) 31'; Gabriel Menino (yellow card) 64'; Kuscevic (yellow card) 84'	Stadium: Ilha do Retiro; Attendance: 0 Referee: Dyorgines José Padovani de Andrade (Espírito Santo)

15 January 2021 30	Palmeiras	1–1	Grêmio	São Paulo
21:30 UTC−3	Raphael Veiga 32'; Breno Lopes (yellow card) 62'; Marcos Rocha (yellow card) 75'; Lucas Lima (yellow card) 90+1'	Report	Kannemann (yellow card) 72'; Diego Souza 87'	Stadium: Allianz Parque; Attendance: 0 Referee: Bruno Arleu de Araújo (Rio de Janeiro)

18 January 2021 28	Palmeiras	4–0	Corinthians	São Paulo
19:00 UTC−3	Viña (yellow card) 29'; Raphael Veiga 33', 47'; Luiz Adriano 44', 65'; Danilo (yellow card) 59'	Report	Gustavo Mosquito (yellow card) 63'; Xavier (yellow card) 71'; Gil (yellow card) 74'; Gabriel (red card) 76'	Stadium: Allianz Parque; Attendance: 0 Referee: Jean Pierre Gonçalves Lima (Rio Grande do Sul)
Note: The match was originally scheduled for 6 January 2021, but was postponed due to Palmeiras' involvement in the Copa Libertadores semi-finals.

21 January 2021 31	Flamengo	2–0	Palmeiras	Brasília
19:00 UTC−3	Luan 45' (o.g.); Bruno Henrique (yellow card) 53'; Pepê 82'; Renê (yellow card) 89'	Report	Raphael Veiga (yellow card) 21'; Luan (yellow card) 70'	Stadium: Mané Garrincha; Attendance: 0 Referee: Sávio Pereira Sampaio (Distrito Federal)

24 January 2021 32	Ceará	2–1	Palmeiras	Fortaleza
16:00 UTC−3	Lima 9'; Vina 28' (pen.); Eduardo (yellow card) 45+2' (yellow-red card) 82'; Léo Chú (yellow card) 56'; Charles (yellow card) 87'	Report	Patrick (yellow card) 26'; Gabriel Veron 32'; Empereur (yellow card) 45'; Emerson Santos (yellow card) 48'; Felipe Melo (yellow card) 83'; Lucas Esteves (yellow card) 84'	Stadium: Arena Castelão; Attendance: 0 Referee: Bráulio da Silva Machado (Santa Catarina)

26 January 2021 1	Palmeiras	1–1	Vasco	São Paulo
20:00 UTC−3	Breno Lopes 30'; Kuscevic (yellow card) 90+1'	Report	Benítez (yellow card) 28', (goal) 34'	Stadium: Allianz Parque; Attendance: 0 Referee: Anderson Daronco (Rio Grande do Sul)
Note: The match was originally scheduled for 9 August 2020, but was postponed due Palmeiras' involvement in the 2020 Campeonato Paulista final.

2 February 2021 33	Palmeiras	1–1	Botafogo	São Paulo
16:00 UTC−3	Emerson Santos 15'; Breno Lopes (yellow card) 31'; Empereur (yellow card) 71'	Report	José Welison (yellow card) 23'; Rafael Navarro 59'	Stadium: Allianz Parque; Attendance: 0 Referee: Felipe Fernandes de Lima (Minas Gerais)

14 February 2021 36	Palmeiras	3–0	Fortaleza	São Paulo
18:15 UTC−3	Gustavo Scarpa 19'; Lucas Lima 25'; Breno Lopes 37'	Report	Derley (yellow card) 83'; Felipe (yellow card) 84'; Wellington Paulista (yellow card) 90'	Stadium: Allianz Parque; Attendance: 0 Referee: Ricardo Marques (Minas Gerais)

17 February 2021 35	Coritiba	1–0	Palmeiras	Curitiba
19:30 UTC−3	Neilton (yellow card) 74'; Jonathan Lemos 87'; Osman (yellow card) 88'	Report	Kuscevic (yellow card) 17' (red card) 62'; Renan (yellow card) 23'; Danilo (yellow card) 65'	Stadium: Couto Pereira; Attendance: 0 Referee: Ramon Abatti Abel (Santa Catarina)
Note: The match was originally scheduled for 8 February 2021, but was postponed due to Palmeiras' involvement in the 2020 FIFA Club World Cup.

19 February 2021 34	São Paulo	1–1	Palmeiras	São Paulo
21:30 UTC−3	Luciano 73' (pen.); Tchê Tchê (yellow card) 77'; Dani Alves (yellow card) 84'	Report	Gómez (yellow card) 62'; Rony 90+2'	Stadium: Morumbi; Attendance: 0 Referee: Leandro Vuaden (Rio Grande do Sul)
Note: The match was originally scheduled for 5 February 2021, but was postponed due to Palmeiras' involvement in the 2020 FIFA Club World Cup.

22 February 2021 37	Palmeiras	1–1	Atlético Goianiense	São Paulo
18:00 UTC−3	Viña 21', (yellow card) 74'; Luan (yellow card) 28'	Report	Matheus Vargas (yellow card) 18', (goal) 42'	Stadium: Allianz Parque; Attendance: 0 Referee: Caio Max Augusto Vieira (Rio Grande do Norte)

25 February 2021 38	Atlético Mineiro	2–0	Palmeiras	Belo Horizonte
21:30 UTC−3	Everson (yellow card) 3'; Zaracho (yellow card) 32'; Jair 78'; Guga (yellow card) 82'; Eduardo Sasha 88'	Report		Stadium: Mineirão; Attendance: 0 Referee: Héber Roberto Lopes (Santa Catarina)

=== Copa do Brasil ===
==== Round of 16 ====
The draw for the round of 16 was held on 1 October 2020.

29 October 2020 First leg	Red Bull Bragantino (São Paulo (state))	1–3	(São Paulo (state)) Palmeiras	Bragança Paulista
19:00 UTC−3	Aderlan (yellow card) 5'; Edimar (yellow card) 29'; Claudinho (yellow card) 44'; Hurtado 82'	Report	Raphael Veiga 4', (yellow card) 26'; Wesley 17', (yellow card) 45+2'; Luiz Adriano 27'; Felipe Melo (yellow card) 60'	Stadium: Nabi Abi Chedid; Attendance: 0 Referee: Jean Pierre Gonçalves Lima (Rio Grande do Sul)

5 November 2020 Second leg	Palmeiras (São Paulo (state))	1–0 (4–1 agg.)	(São Paulo (state)) Red Bull Bragantino	São Paulo
19:00 UTC−3	Gabriel Veron 28'	Report	Luan Cândido (yellow card) 61' (yellow-red card) 65'	Stadium: Allianz Parque; Attendance: 0 Referee: Vinicius Gonçalves Dias Araújo (São Paulo)

==== Quarterfinal ====
The draw for the quarter-finals was held on 6 November 2020.

11 November 2020 First leg	Palmeiras (São Paulo (state))	3–0	Ceará	São Paulo
16:30 UTC−3	Gustavo Scarpa 34'; Raphael Veiga 37'; Gabriel Veron 39'; Emerson Santos (yellow card) 46'; Renan (yellow card) 90+5'	Report	Tiago (yellow card) 41'; Fabinho (yellow card) 90+6'	Stadium: Allianz Parque; Attendance: 0 Referee: Bráulio da Silva Machado (Santa Catarina)

18 November 2020 Second leg	Ceará	2–2 (2–5 agg.)	(São Paulo (state)) Palmeiras	Fortaleza
19:00 UTC−3	Charles (yellow card) 26'; Felipe Baxola (yellow card) 30'; Fernando Sobral (yellow card) 43'; Vina 56'; Tiago 61'; Luiz Otávio (yellow card) 78'; Leandro Carvalho (red card) 84'; Bruno Pacheco (yellow card) 90+6'	Report	Raphael Veiga 27' (pen.), 45+4'; Ramires (yellow card) 44'; Weverton (yellow card) 62'; Patrick (yellow card) 74'	Stadium: Castelão; Attendance: 0 Referee: Paulo Roberto Alves Júnior (Paraná)

==== Semifinal ====
The draw to determine the home and away teams for both legs was held at CBF headquarters on 24 November 2020.

23 December 2020 First leg	Palmeiras (São Paulo (state))	1–1	(Minas Gerais) América Mineiro	São Paulo
21:30 UTC−3	Gómez 45+3'; Lucas Lima (yellow card) 85'; Danilo (yellow card) 87'	Report	Ademir 19'; Daniel Borges (yellow card) 45+1'; Lucas Luan (yellow card) 82'	Stadium: Allianz Parque; Attendance: 0 Referee: Leandro Vuaden (Rio Grande do Sul)

30 December 2020 Second leg	América Mineiro (Minas Gerais)	0–2 (1–3 agg.)	(São Paulo (state)) Palmeiras	Belo Horizonte
21:30 UTC−3	Daniel Borges (yellow card) 52'; Rodolfo (yellow card) 70'	Report	Gómez (yellow card) 38'; Luiz Adriano 68'; Lucas Lima (yellow card) 84'; Rony 84'	Stadium: Estádio Independência; Attendance: 0 Referee: Wilton Pereira Sampaio (Goiás)

==== Final ====
The draw to determine the home and away teams for both legs was held at CBF headquarters on 14 January 2021.

28 February 2021 First leg	Grêmio (Rio Grande do Sul)	0–1	(São Paulo (state)) Palmeiras	Porto Alegre
21:00 UTC−3	Diogo Barbosa (yellow card) 53'; Kannemann (yellow card) 86'; Vanderson (yellow card) 90+2'	Report	Gómez 31'; Luan (red card) 64'; Zé Rafael (yellow card) 78'; Willian (yellow card) 84'	Stadium: Arena do Grêmio; Attendance: 0 Referee: Marcelo de Lima Henrique (Rio de Janeiro)

7 March 2021 Second leg	Palmeiras (São Paulo (state))	2–0 (3–0 agg.)	(Rio Grande do Sul) Grêmio	São Paulo
18:00 UTC−3	Zé Rafael (yellow card) 16'; Wesley 52'; Mayke (yellow card) 53'; Gabriel Menino 84'; Lucas Esteves (yellow card) 85'; Marcos Rocha (yellow card) 86'	Report	Paulo Miranda (yellow card) 26'; Kannemann (yellow card) 29'	Stadium: Allianz Parque; Attendance: 0 Referee: Bruno Arleu de Araújo (Rio de Janeiro)

=== FIFA Club World Cup ===
Palmeiras qualified for the Club World Cup by winning the Copa Libertadores.

==== Semifinal ====
7 February 2021	Palmeiras (Brazil)	0–1	(Mexico) UANL	Al Rayyan, Qatar
15:00 UTC−3	Gabriel Menino (yellow card) 32'; Luan (yellow card) 52'	Report	Aquino (yellow card) 45'; Gignac 54' (pen.); Guzmán (yellow card) 84'	Stadium: Education City Stadium; Attendance: 1,854; Referee: Danny Makkelie (Netherlands)

==== Third place match ====
11 February 2021	Al Ahly (Egypt)	0–0 (3–2 p)	(Brazil) Palmeiras	Al Rayyan, Qatar
12:00 UTC−3		Report	Weverton (yellow card) 27'	Stadium: Education City Stadium; Attendance: 5,606; Referee: Maguette N'Diaye (Senegal)
	Penalties
	Benoun (penalty scored); El Solia (penalty missed); M. Mohsen (penalty missed); Hany (penalty scored); Ajayi (penalty scored)		(penalty missed) Rony; (penalty missed) Luiz Adriano; (penalty scored) Gustavo Scarpa; (penalty scored) Gómez; (penalty missed) Felipe Melo

== Statistics ==
=== Overall statistics ===
Games played	77 (16 Campeonato Paulista, 13 Copa Libertadores, 38 Série A, 8 Copa do Brasil, 2 FIFA Club World Cup)
Games won	39 (8 Campeonato Paulista, 10 Copa Libertadores, 15 Série A, 6 Copa do Brasil, 0 FIFA Club World Cup)
Games drawn	24 (6 Campeonato Paulista, 2 Copa Libertadores, 13 Série A, 2 Copa do Brasil, 1 FIFA Club World Cup)
Games lost	14 (2 Campeonato Paulista, 1 Copa Libertadores, 10 Série A, 0 Copa do Brasil, 1 FIFA Club World Cup)
Goals scored	120
Goals conceded	55
Goal difference	+65 (+14 Campeonato Paulista, +27 Copa Libertadores, +14 Série A, +11 Copa do Brasil, -1 FIFA Club World Cup)
Clean sheets	34
Most clean sheets	Weverton (34)
Best result	5–0 (vs. Bolívar, Copa Libertadores – September 30); 5–0 (vs. Tigre, Copa Libertadores – October 21); 5–0 (vs. Delfín, Copa Libertadores – December 2)
Worst result	0–2 (vs. São Paulo, Série A – October 10); 1–3 (vs. Coritiba, Série A – October 14); 0–2 (vs. Fortaleza, Série A – October 18); 0–2 (vs. Internacional, Série A – December 19); 0–2 (vs. River Plate, Copa Libertadores – January 12, 2021); 0–2 (vs. Flamengo, Série A – January 21, 2021); 0–2 (vs. Atlético Mineiro, Série A – February 25, 2021)
Yellow cards	179
Red cards	9
Top scorer	Luiz Adriano (20 goals)

=== Goalscorers ===
In italic players who left the team in mid-season.

Place	Position	Nationality	Number	Name	Campeonato Paulista	Copa Libertadores	Série A	Copa do Brasil	Total
1	FW	(Brazil)	10	Luiz Adriano	3	5	10	2	20
2	MF	(Brazil)	23	Raphael Veiga	1	2	11	4	18
3	FW	(Brazil)	29	Willian	6	4	7	0	17
4	FW	(Brazil)	11	Rony	0	5	5	1	11
5	FW	(Brazil)	27	Gabriel Veron	0	3	4	2	9
6	DF	(Paraguay)	15	Gómez	1	2	1	2	6
7	MF	(Brazil)	8	Zé Rafael	1	2	2	0	5
7	MF	(Brazil)	5	Patrick de Paula	1	1	3	0	5
7	FW	(Brazil)	47	Wesley	0	1	2	2	5
8	MF	(Brazil)	14	Gustavo Scarpa	1	1	1	1	4
8	MF	(Brazil)	25	Gabriel Menino	0	3	0	1	4
9	FW	(Brazil)	39	Breno Lopes	0	1	2	0	3
9	DF	(Uruguay)	17	Viña	0	2	1	0	3
10	FW	(Brazil)	7	Dudu	2	0	0	0	2
10	DF	(Brazil)	2	Marcos Rocha	2	0	0	0	2
10	MF	(Brazil)	20	Lucas Lima	1	0	1	0	2
11	MF	(Brazil)	18	Ramires	1	0	0	0	1
11	DF	(Brazil)	30	Felipe Melo	1	0	0	0	1
11	MF	(Brazil)	28	Danilo	0	1	0	0	1
11	DF	(Brazil)	34	Emerson Santos	0	0	1	0	1
