= Renan (footballer, born 2002) =

Brazilian footballer

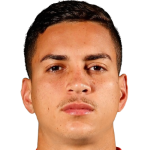

Personal information
- Full name: Renan Victor da Silva
- Date of birth: 19 May 2002 (age 24)
- Place of birth: Itapevi, Brazil
- Height: 1.79 m (5 ft 10 in)
- Position: Defender

Team information
- Current team: Shabab Al Ahli
- Number: 13

Youth career
- 2015–2020: Palmeiras

Senior career*
Years	Team	Apps	(Gls)
2020–2022	Palmeiras	54	(1)
2022	→ Red Bull Bragantino (loan)	8	(0)
2022–	Shabab Al Ahli	18	(2)

International career^{‡}
2018–2019	Brazil U17	6	(0)
- * Club domestic league appearances and goals as of 22:27, 9 December 2023 (UTC) ‡ National team caps and goals as of 18:02, 16 October 2020 (UTC)

Renan Victor da Silva (born 19 May 2002), simply known as Renan, is a Brazilian footballer who plays for Shabab Al Ahli mainly as central defender, he can also play as a left back.

== Accident ==
On July 22, 2022, a Friday morning, at 6:40 am Renan was involved in a car accident in Bragança Paulista which resulted in the death of a 38-year-old man. Renan admitted being drunk and the police found out that he was driving without a driver's license. Upon the incident, Red Bull Bragantino immediately terminated his contract. The following day, he was released from prison on bail.

== Career statistics ==
As of 30 December 2023

Appearances and goals by club, season and competition
Club	Season	League			State League		Cup		Continental		Other		Total	
Club	Season	Division	Apps	Goals	Apps	Goals	Apps	Goals	Apps	Goals	Apps	Goals	Apps	Goals
Palmeiras	2020	Série A	8	0	—		2	0	1 (Note: Appearance(s) in Copa Libertadores)	0	0	0	11	0
Palmeiras	2021	Série A	21	0	10	0	2	0	8	1	0	0	41	1
Palmeiras	2022	Série A	0	0	2	0	—		—		0	0	2	0
Red Bull Bragantino	2022	Série A	4	0	—		1	0	3	0	—		8	0
Shabab Al Ahli	2022-23	UPL	9	0	—		1	0	—		—		10	0
Shabab Al Ahli	2023-24	UPL	12	2	—		—		2 (Note: Appearance(s) in AFC Champions League)	1	3	0	17	3
Career total			54	2	12	0	6	0	13	2	3	0	84	4

== Honours ==
=== Club ===
Palmeiras

- Copa Libertadores: 2020, 2021
- Copa do Brasil: 2020
- Recopa Sudamericana: 2022
- Campeonato Paulista: 2022

=== International ===
Brazil U17

- FIFA U-17 World Cup: 2019

=== Individual ===
- Campeonato Paulista Breakthrough Player: 2021
