= Gabriel Menino =

Brazilian footballer (born 2000)

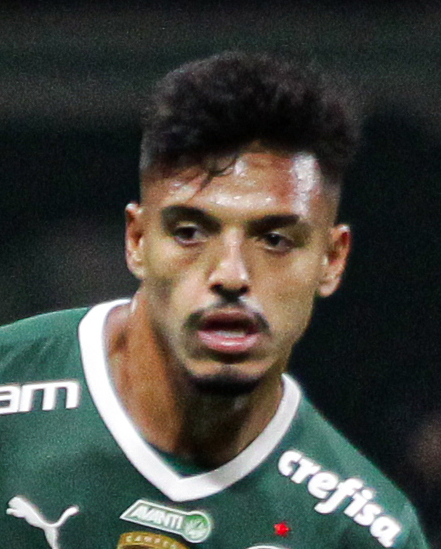
- Menino as a player of Palmeiras in 2022

Personal information
- Full name: Gabriel Vinicius Menino
- Date of birth: 29 September 2000 (age 26)
- Place of birth: Morungaba, São Paulo, Brazil
- Height: 1.76 m (5 ft 9 in)
- Positions: Right-back; midfielder

Team information
- Current team: Santos (on loan from Atlético Mineiro)
- Number: 25

Youth career
- 2015–2017: Guarani
- 2017–2019: Palmeiras

Senior career*
Years	Team	Apps	(Gls)
2020–2024	Palmeiras	174	(11)
2025–	Atlético Mineiro	33	(1)
2026–	→ Santos (loan)	19	(2)

International career^{‡}
2018–2019	Brazil U20	11	(1)
2021	Brazil U23	6	(0)
Medal record
Men's football
Representing Brazil
Olympic Games
Gold medal – first place	2020 Tokyo	Team
- * Club domestic league appearances and goals as of 17:43, 13 October 2026 (UTC) ‡ National team caps and goals as of 11:10, 26 October 2022 (UTC)

Gabriel Vinicius Menino (born 29 September 2000), known as Gabriel Menino, is a Brazilian professional footballer who plays as either a right-back or a midfielder for Santos, on loan from Atlético Mineiro.

== Club career ==
=== Early career ===
Born in Morungaba, São Paulo, Menino joined the youth categories of Palmeiras in 2017, from Guarani. In his first year at the club, he was a member of the Copa do Brasil Sub-17 winning team.

On 1 October 2018, after becoming a regular member of the under-20 team of Verdão, Menino renewed his contract until 2023. In that year, he was caught in a doping exam when playing for the under-20 national team, with the prohibited substance being clenbuterol, but was absolved shortly after as the club was able to prove that the contamination came from food ingestion.

=== Palmeiras ===
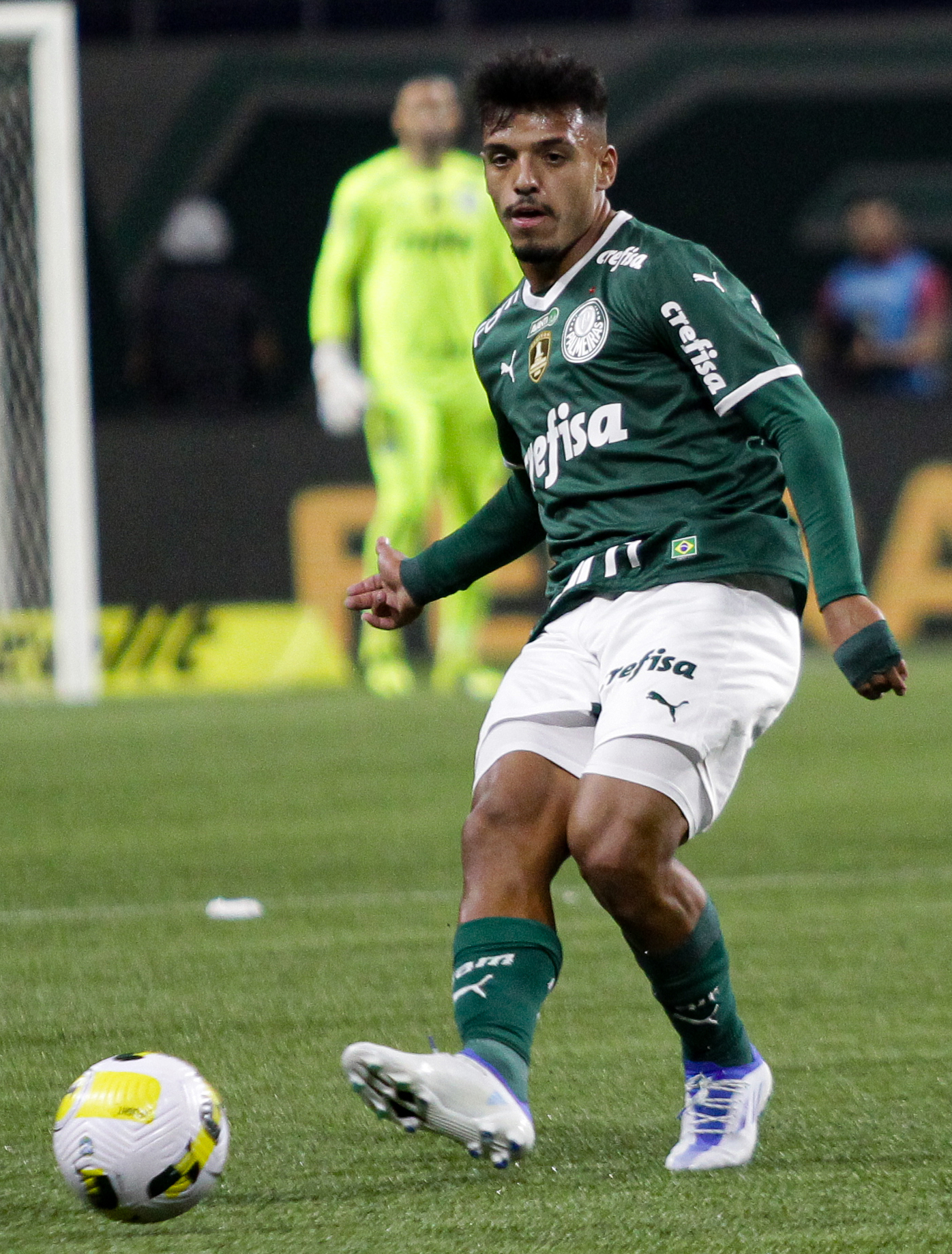
Menino playing for Palmeiras in 2022

On 25 November 2019, Menino was promoted to the first team ahead of the 2020 season. He made his senior debut on 22 January 2020, playing the full 90 minutes in a 4–0 Campeonato Paulista away win over Ituano. In March, he further extended his link until December 2024.

After helping the club to win the 2020 Campeonato Paulista, Menino made his Série A debut on 12 August of that year, starting in a 1–1 away draw against Fluminense. He scored his first professional goal on 17 September, in a 2–1 win over Bolívar in the Copa Libertadores; aged 19 years, 11 months and 16 days, he became the second-youngest ever to score for the club in the competition at that time.

Menino quickly established himself as a first-team regular at Palmeiras in his first season, also featuring as a right-back when Marcos Rocha and Mayke were out injured. He was also a starter in the 2020 Copa Libertadores final, featuring in 85 as the club lifted the trophy of the competition after 21 years.

On 19 February 2022, despite losing his starting spot, Menino had his contract renewed until December 2025. He profitted from Danilo's departure to Nottingham Forest to regain a starting spot during the 2023 campaign, and extended his link with the club until December 2027 on 6 January 2024.

=== Atlético Mineiro ===
On 1 January 2025, Menino joined Atlético Mineiro on a four-year deal. He made his club debut late in the month, starting in a 1–1 Campeonato Mineiro home draw against América Mineiro.

Menino scored his first goal for Galo on 10 August 2025, netting the opener within 37 seconds in a 1–1 away draw against Vasco da Gama; it was the fastest goal of the 2025 Série A at that time. Regularly used under head coach Cuca, he lost space after the arrival of Jorge Sampaoli.

==== Loan to Santos ====
On 14 January 2026, Santos announced Menino on loan until the end of the year. He made his club debut four days later, starting in a 1–1 away draw against his first club Guarani, and scored his first goal on 28 January, but in a 4–2 away loss to Chapecoense.

== International career ==
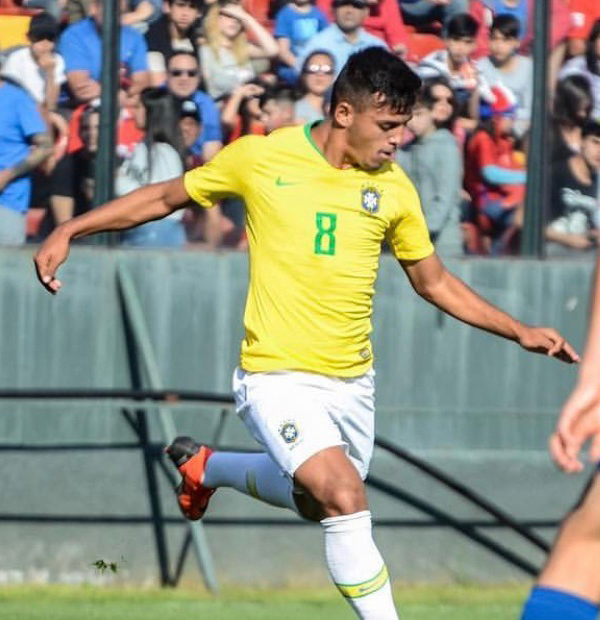
Menino in action for the Brazil national under-20 team in the 2019 South American U-20 Championship

In September 2018, Menino and three other Palmeiras teammates appeared with the Brazil national under-20 team in friendlies in Mexico, In October, he scored a goal in a friendly against Chile, and also made the final list for the 2019 South American U-20 Championship in December.

On 18 September 2020, Menino received his first call up to the full side as a right-back, for the 2022 FIFA World Cup qualifiers against Bolivia and Peru. He was an unused substitute in both matches.

On 17 June 2021, Menino was named in the Brazil squad for the 2020 Summer Olympics. He played in three matches during the competition, also coming on as an extra-time substitute in the Gold Medal match against Spain.

== Career statistics ==
As of 13 October 2026.

Club	Season	League			State league (Note: Includes Campeonato Paulista, Campeonato Mineiro)		Cup		Continental		Other		Total	
Club	Season	Division	Apps	Goals	Apps	Goals	Apps	Goals	Apps	Goals	Apps	Goals	Apps	Goals
Palmeiras	2020	Série A	27	0	12	0	6	1	12 (Note: Appearance(s) in Copa Libertadores)	3	2 (Note: Appearance(s) in FIFA Club World Cup)	0	59	4
Palmeiras	2021	Série A	18	2	9	0	0	0	5	0	2 (Note: One appearance in Supercopa do Brasil, one appearance in Recopa Sudamericana)	0	34	2
Palmeiras	2022	Série A	27	2	4	0	3	0	11	0	0	0	45	2
Palmeiras	2023	Série A	24	2	15	3	6	1	11	0	1 (Note: Appearance in Supercopa do Brasil)	2	57	8
Palmeiras	2024	Série A	27	1	11	1	4	0	5	0	1	0	48	2
Palmeiras	Total		123	7	51	4	19	2	44	3	6	2	243	18
Atlético Mineiro	2025	Série A	23	1	9	0	5	0	8 (Note: Appearance(s) in Copa Sudamericana)	0	—		45	1
Santos (loan)	2026	Série A	13	1	6	1	3	0	3	2	—		25	4
Career total			159	9	66	5	27	2	55	5	6	2	313	23

== Honours ==
=== Club ===
Palmeiras

- Campeonato Paulista: 2020, 2022, 2023, 2024
- Copa do Brasil: 2020
- Copa Libertadores: 2020, 2021
- Recopa Sudamericana: 2022
- Campeonato Brasileiro Série A: 2022, 2023
- Supercopa do Brasil: 2023

Atlético Mineiro

- Campeonato Mineiro: 2025

Brazil Olympic

- Summer Olympics: 2020

Individual

- Copa Libertadores Team of the Tournament: 2020
- IFFHS CONMEBOL Youth Team of the Year: 2020
- Troféu Mesa Redonda's Best Newcomer in Brazilian Football: 2020
- Copa do Brasil Final Ideal Team: 2020
- Campeonato Mineiro Team of the Year: 2025
- Supercopa do Brasil top scorer: 2023 (2 goals)
