= Matías Viña =

Uruguayan footballer (born 1997)

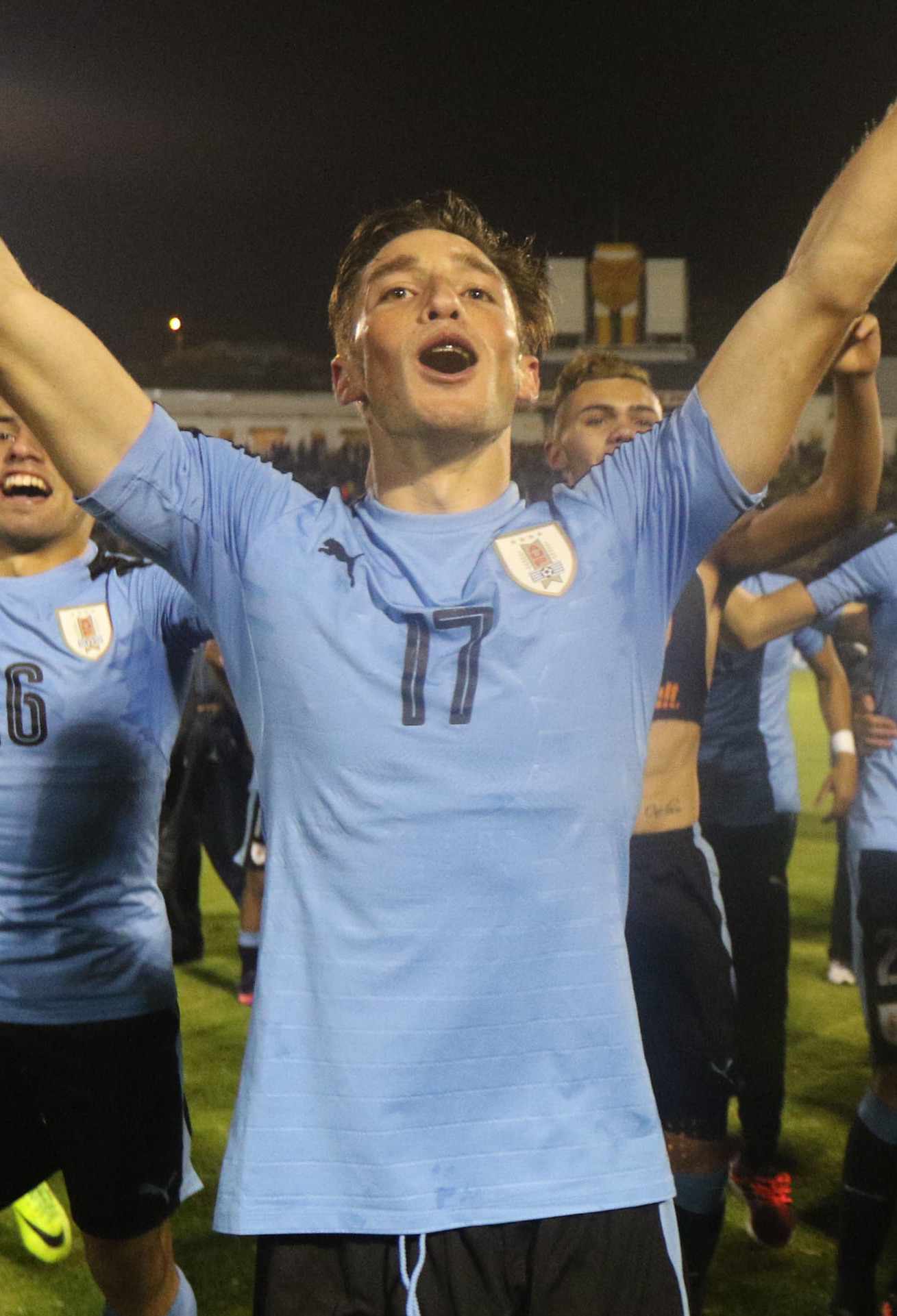
- Viña with Uruguay U20 in 2017

Personal information
- Full name: Matías Nicolás Viña Susperreguy
- Date of birth: 9 November 1997 (age 29)
- Place of birth: Empalme Olmos, Uruguay
- Height: 1.75 m (5 ft 9 in)
- Positions: Left-back; left wing-back

Team information
- Current team: Cruzeiro (on loan from Flamengo)

Youth career
- 2015–2017: Nacional

Senior career*
Years	Team	Apps	(Gls)
2017–2020	Nacional	39	(5)
2020–2021	Palmeiras	44	(3)
2021–2024	Roma	29	(0)
2023	→ Bournemouth (loan)	12	(2)
2023–2024	→ Sassuolo (loan)	15	(0)
2024–	Flamengo	23	(0)
2026	→ River Plate (loan)	10	(0)
2026–	→ Cruzeiro (loan)	0	(0)

International career^{‡}
2016–2017	Uruguay U20	27	(4)
2019–	Uruguay	44	(1)
Medal record
Men's football
Representing Uruguay
Copa América
Third place	2024 United States
South American U-20 Championship
Winner	2017 Ecuador
- * Club domestic league appearances and goals as of 17:53, 29 January 2026 (UTC) ‡ National team caps and goals as of 16 June 2026

Matías Nicolás Viña Susperreguy (born 9 November 1997) is a Uruguayan professional footballer who plays as a left-back or left wing-back for Cruzeiro, on loan from Flamengo and the Uruguay national team.

== Club career ==
=== Nacional ===
Viña was signed by Nacional in 2015 when he was 17 years old. He joined the Fourth Division and had the opportunity to practice with the professional team. One year later, Viña achieved his first minutes with the club's reserve team, having played eight games in the Third Division.

=== Palmeiras ===
On 31 January 2020, Viña left the club to join Campeonato Brasileiro Série A side Palmeiras, where he won the treble consisting of the Campeonato Paulista, Copa Libertadores and Copa do Brasil.

=== Roma ===
In August 2021, he signed for Serie A club A.S. Roma.

==== Loan Bournemouth and Sassuolo ====
On 30 January 2023, Viña joined Premier League club AFC Bournemouth on loan until the end of the season, with an option to buy for €15 million. On 15 April, he scored his first goal for the club following his first ever start, coming in a 3–2 away win at Tottenham Hotspur. He returned to Roma after Bournemouth opted not to make the transfer permanent and joined fellow Italian club Sassuolo on loan.

=== Flamengo ===
On 25 January 2024, Viña signed a four-year contract with Campeonato Brasileiro Série A club Flamengo, for a reported fee of €9 million.

On 11 August 2024, in a match against his former club Palmeiras, Viña suffered a serious injury which included a fractured tibia, a torn cruciate ligament in his knee and a torn meniscus. He underwent surgery to fix the fracture in his tibia and reconstruct the anterior cruciate ligament in his right knee.

==== Loan to Cruzeiro ====
On 11 September 2026 after terminating his loan contract with River Plate, he joined Campeonato Brasileiro Série A club Cruzeiro until the end of the 2026 season. The deal runs until December and includes a $4.5 million purchase option.

== International career ==
Making his debut in 2016 for the Uruguay under-20 team in a friendly against Chile, Viña played in both the 2017 South American U-20 Championship, coming first, and in the 2017 FIFA U-20 World Cup, finishing in fourth place. He played 27 games for the youth selection, scoring four times.

Viña made his senior international debut for Uruguay on 6 September 2019, coming on from the bench in a friendly against Costa Rica. His debut as a starter came four days later, in a friendly against the United States; Viña played the whole 90 minutes in a 1–1 draw.

Viña was included in Uruguay's 2022 World Cup squad and made two appearances in their three-game campaign, although they were both off the bench. On 31 May 2026, he was named in Uruguay's 26-man squad for the 2026 FIFA World Cup.

== Career statistics ==
=== Club ===
As of match played 16 March 2025

Appearances and goals by club, season and competition
Club	Season	League			State league (Note: Includes Campeonato Paulista)		National cup (Note: Includes Copa do Brasil, Coppa Italia)		Continental		Other		Total	
Club	Season	Division	Apps	Goals	Apps	Goals	Apps	Goals	Apps	Goals	Apps	Goals	Apps	Goals
Nacional	2017	Uruguayan Primera División	4	0	—		—		0	0	0	0	4	0
Nacional	2018	Uruguayan Primera División	1	0	—		—		0	0	0	0	1	0
Nacional	2019	Uruguayan Primera División	34	5	—		—		7 (Note: Appearances in Copa Libertadores)	0	3 (Note: Two appearances in Uruguayan Primera División season play-offs, one appearance in Supercopa Uruguaya)	0	44	5
Nacional	Total		39	5	—		—		7	0	3	0	49	5
Palmeiras	2020	Série A	23	1	7	0	6	0	12	2	—		48	3
Palmeiras	2021	Série A	4	0	10	1	0	0	3	1	3 (Note: One appearance in Supercopa do Brasil, two appearances in Recopa Sudamericana)	0	20	2
Palmeiras	Total		27	1	17	1	6	0	15	3	3	0	68	5
Roma	2021–22	Serie A	26	0	—		2	0	9 (Note: Appearances in UEFA Europa Conference League)	0	—		37	0
Roma	2022–23	Serie A	3	0	—		0	0	4 (Note: Appearances in UEFA Europa League)	0	—		7	0
Roma	Total		29	0	—		2	0	13	0	—		44	0
Bournemouth (loan)	2022–23	Premier League	12	2	—		—		—		—		12	2
Sassuolo (loan)	2023–24	Serie A	15	0	—		1	0	–		–		16	0
Flamengo	2024	Série A	9	0	5	0	3	0	5	1	—		22	1
Flamengo	2025	Série A	0	0	0	0	0	0	0	0	—		0	0
Flamengo	Total		9	0	5	0	3	0	5	1	—		22	1
Career total			131	8	22	1	12	0	40	4	6	0	211	13

=== International ===
As of match played 15 June 2026

Appearances and goals by national team and year
National team	Year	Apps	Goals
Uruguay	2019	6	0
Uruguay	2020	3	0
Uruguay	2021	12	0
Uruguay	2022	7	0
Uruguay	2023	7	0
Uruguay	2024	6	1
Uruguay	2025	2	0
Uruguay	2026	1	0
Total		44	1

Scores and results list Uruguay's goal tally first, score column indicates score after each Viña goal.

List of international goals scored by Matías Viña
No.	Date	Venue	Opponent	Score	Result	Competition
1	23 June 2024	Hard Rock Stadium, Miami Gardens, United States	Panama	3–0	3–1	2024 Copa América

== Honours ==
=== Club ===
Nacional

- Uruguayan Primera División: 2019
- Supercopa Uruguaya: 2019

Palmeiras

- Copa do Brasil: 2020
- Campeonato Paulista: 2020
- Copa Libertadores: 2020, 2021
- Recopa Sudamericana runner-up: 2021

Roma

- UEFA Europa Conference League: 2021–22

Flamengo

- Copa Libertadores: 2025
- Campeonato Brasileiro Série A: 2025
- Copa do Brasil: 2024
- Supercopa do Brasil: 2025
- Campeonato Carioca: 2024, 2025

=== National team ===
Uruguay U20

- South American Youth Football Championship: 2017

Uruguay

- Copa América third place: 2024

=== Individual ===
- Uruguayan Primera División Player of the Year: 2019
- Uruguayan Primera División Team of the Year: 2019
- Copa Libertadores Team of the Tournament: 2020
