= Luan Silva (footballer, born 1999) =

Brazilian footballer

Personal information
- Full name: Luan Silva dos Santos
- Date of birth: 26 February 1999 (age 27)
- Place of birth: Salvador, Brazil
- Height: 1.80 m (5 ft 11 in)
- Position: Forward

Youth career
- Vitória

Senior career*
| Years | Team | Apps | (Gls) |
| 2018–2023 | Vitória | 21 | (2) |
| 2019–2022 | → Palmeiras (loan) | 1 | (0) |

International career^{‡}
| 2017 | Brazil U20 | 1 | (0) |
- * Club domestic league appearances and goals as of 23:21, 2 February 2022 (UTC) ‡ National team caps and goals as of 23:21, 2 February 2022 (UTC)

Luan Silva dos Santos (born 26 February 1999) is a Brazilian footballer who plays as a forward.

== Career statistics ==
=== Club ===
As of 29 March 2019.

| Club | Season | League | | | State League | | Cup | | Continental | | Other | | Total | |
| Club | Season | Division | Apps | Goals | Apps | Goals | Apps | Goals | Apps | Goals | Apps | Goals | Apps | Goals |
|---|---|---|---|---|---|---|---|---|---|---|---|---|---|---|
| Vitória | 2018 | Série A | 6 | 1 | 6 (Note: Appearance(s) in Campeonato Baiano) | 1 | 2 | 0 | — | | 5 (Note: Appearance(s) in Copa do Nordeste) | 0 | 19 | 2 |
| Vitória | 2019 | Série B | 0 | 0 | 0 | 0 | 0 | 0 | — | | 2 | 0 | 2 | 0 |
| Vitória | Total | | 6 | 1 | 6 | 1 | 2 | 0 | — | | 7 | 0 | 21 | 2 |
| Palmeiras (loan) | 2020 | Série A | 0 | 0 | 1 (Note: Appearance(s) in Campeonato Paulista) | 0 | 0 | 0 | 0 | 0 | — | | 1 | 0 |
| Palmeiras (loan) | 2021 | Série A | 0 | 0 | — | | 0 | 0 | — | | — | | 0 | 0 |
| Palmeiras (loan) | Total | | 0 | 0 | 1 | 0 | 0 | 0 | 0 | 0 | 0 | 0 | 1 | 0 |
| Career total | | | 6 | 1 | 7 | 1 | 2 | 0 | 0 | 0 | 7 | 0 | 22 | 2 |

== Honours ==
Palmeiras

- Campeonato Paulista: 2020
- Copa Libertadores: 2020
- Copa do Brasil: 2020
