= Ramon Rocha =

Brazilian footballer (born 2001)

Personal information
- Full name: Ramon Ricardo da Rocha
- Date of birth: 19 March 2001 (age 25)
- Place of birth: Baixo Guandu, Brazil
- Height: 1.74 m (5 ft 9 in)
- Position: Right back

Team information
- Current team: União Suzano

Youth career
- 2012–2016: Ubaense
- 2016–2021: Palmeiras
- 2021: Cruzeiro

Senior career*
Years	Team	Apps	(Gls)
2022	Novorizontino	0	(0)
2023	Portuguesa	2	(0)
2024–	União Suzano	3	(0)
- * Club domestic league appearances and goals as of 20:25, 5 February 2024 (UTC)

Ramon Ricardo da Rocha (born 19 March 2001), known as Ramon Rocha, is a Brazilian footballer who plays as a right back for União Suzano.

== Club career ==
Born in Baixo Guandu, Espírito Santo, Ramon Rocha joined Palmeiras' youth setup in 2016. He was also an unused substitute in a 2–2 Série A away draw against Santos on 6 December 2020.

Ramon Rocha left Palmeiras on 11 March 2021, and joined Cruzeiro. After playing exclusively for the under-20 side of the club during the 2021 season, he suffered a knee injury in October of that year.

On 8 December 2022, after a short period at Novorizontino (where he did not play), Ramon Rocha signed for Portuguesa for the 2023 Campeonato Paulista. He made his senior debut on 26 January 2023, replacing Pará late into a 4–1 away loss against São Paulo.

On 9 February 2023, Ramon left Lusa on a mutual agreement.

== Career statistics ==
As of 7 February 2023

Club	Season	League			State League		Cup		Continental		Other		Total	
Club	Season	Division	Apps	Goals	Apps	Goals	Apps	Goals	Apps	Goals	Apps	Goals	Apps	Goals
Portuguesa	2023	Paulista	—		2	0	—		—		—		2	0
União Suzano	2024	Paulista A3	—		3	0	—		—		—		3	0
Career total			0	0	5	0	0	0	0	0	0	0	5	0

== Honours ==
Palmeiras

- Copa Libertadores: 2020
