= Rhuan (footballer, born October 2000) =

Brazilian footballer

Personal information
- Full name: Rhuan Ferreira Ramos
- Date of birth: 18 October 2000 (age 26)
- Place of birth: Santos, Brazil
- Height: 1.77 m (5 ft 10 in)
- Position: Left-back

Team information
- Current team: Ferroviária
- Number: 6

Youth career
- 2012: São Paulo
- 2013–2019: Santos

Senior career*
Years	Team	Apps	(Gls)
2020–2024	Água Santa	43	(2)
2021	→ Ituano (loan)	16	(0)
2022	→ Mirassol (loan)	10	(0)
2023	→ CSA (loan)	14	(0)
2024	Vila Nova	31	(1)
2025	CRB	4	(0)
2025–2026	Maringá	16	(0)
2026–	Ferroviária	8	(0)
- * Club domestic league appearances and goals as of 9 November 2026

Rhuan Ferreira Ramos (born 18 September 2000), simply known as Rhuan, is a Brazilian footballer who plays as a left-back for Ferroviária.

== Career ==
Born in Santos, São Paulo, Rhuan joined Santos' youth setup in 2013, after a short spell at São Paulo. On 1 November 2016, he signed his first professional contract with the former club, agreeing to a three-year deal.

Rhuan left Peixe in September 2019 after his contract expired, and joined Água Santa for the 2020 season. He made his senior debut on 26 July 2020, starting in a 2–1 Campeonato Paulista away loss to Palmeiras.

On 4 June 2021, after establishing himself as a starter, Rhuan was loaned to Série C side Ituano for the remainder of the year. Back to Água Santa for the 2022 Campeonato Paulista, he moved to Mirassol also in a temporary deal on 1 April of that year; he won the third division with both sides.

On 9 March 2023, CSA announced the signing of Rhuan on loan. On 19 March of the following year, he agreed to a permanent deal with Vila Nova in the Série B.

== Career statistics ==
As of 1 November 2024.

Club	Season	League			State League		Cup		Continental		Other		Total	
Club	Season	Division	Apps	Goals	Apps	Goals	Apps	Goals	Apps	Goals	Apps	Goals	Apps	Goals
Água Santa	2020	Paulista	—		1	0	—		—		10 (Note: Appearance(s) in Copa Paulista)	0	11	0
Água Santa	2021	Paulista A2	—		20	2	—		—		—		20	2
Água Santa	2022	Paulista	—		13	0	—		—		—		13	0
Água Santa	2023	Paulista	—		4	0	—		—		—		4	0
Água Santa	2024	Série D	0	0	5	0	0	0	—		—		5	0
Água Santa	Total		0	0	43	2	0	0	—		10	0	53	2
Ituano (loan)	2021	Série C	16	0	—		—		—		—		16	0
Mirassol (loan)	2022	Série C	10	0	—		—		—		—		10	0
CSA (loan)	2023	Série C	14	0	—		3	0	—		—		17	0
Vila Nova	2024	Série B	28	1	—		—		—		—		28	1
Career total			68	1	43	2	3	0	0	0	10	0	124	3

== Honours ==
Ituano

- Campeonato Brasileiro Série C: 2021

Mirassol

- Campeonato Brasileiro Série C: 2022
