= Wesley (footballer, born 1999) =

Brazilian footballer

Wesley Ribeiro
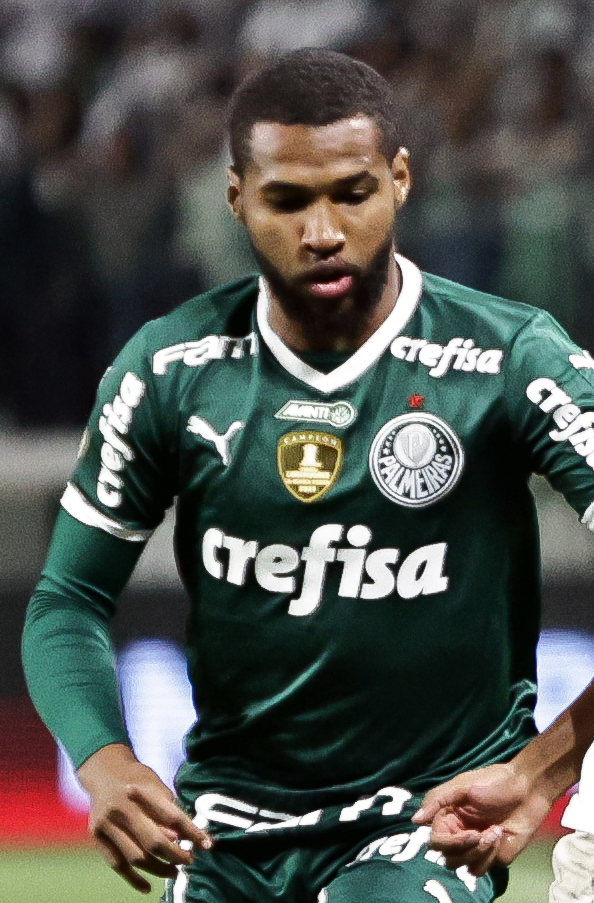
- Wesley playing for Palmeiras in 2022

Personal information
- Full name: Wesley Ribeiro Silva
- Date of birth: 30 March 1999 (age 27)
- Place of birth: Salvador, Brazil
- Height: 1.75 m (5 ft 9 in)
- Position: Winger

Team information
- Current team: Al-Rayyan
- Number: 7

Youth career
- 2016–2019: Palmeiras

Senior career*
Years	Team	Apps	(Gls)
2019–2022	Palmeiras	124	(13)
2019	→ Vitória (loan)	28	(5)
2023	Cruzeiro	42	(4)
2024–2025	Internacional	51	(11)
2025–	Al-Rayyan	0	(0)
- * Club domestic league appearances and goals as of 16 April 2023

Wesley Ribeiro Silva (born 30 March 1999), simply known as Wesley Ribeiro or simply Wesley, is a Brazilian professional footballer who plays as a winger for Al-Rayyan.

== Career statistics ==
As of 6 December 2021

Appearances and goals by club, season and competition
Club	Season	League			State League		Cup		Continental		Other		Total	
Club	Season	Division	Apps	Goals	Apps	Goals	Apps	Goals	Apps	Goals	Apps	Goals	Apps	Goals
Palmeiras	2019	Série A	0	0	0	0	0	0	—		—		0	0
Palmeiras	2020	Série A	15	2	3	0	4	2	3 (Note: Appearance(s) in Copa Libertadores)	1	—		25	5
Palmeiras	2021	Série A	23	4	11	1	2	0	12	0	2 (Note: One appearance in Supercopa do Brasil, one appearance in Recopa Sudamericana)	0	50	5
Palmeiras	Total		38	6	14	1	6	2	15	1	2	0	75	10
Vitória (loan)	2019	Série B	28	5	—		—		—		—		28	5
Career total			66	11	14	1	6	2	15	1	2	0	103	15

== Honours ==
Palmeiras

- Campeonato Paulista: 2020, 2022
- Copa do Brasil: 2020
- Copa Libertadores: 2020, 2021
- Recopa Sudamericana: 2022
- Campeonato Brasileiro Série A: 2022
- FIFA Club World Cup Runner Up: 2021

Internacional

- Campeonato Gaúcho: 2025

Individual

- CEE Cup Player of the Tournament: 2018
- The best of de Final of the Copa do Brasil: 2020
- Copa do Brasil Team of the Final: 2020
