= Emerson Santos (footballer, born 1995) =

Brazilian footballer

Personal information
- Full name: Emerson Raymundo Santos
- Date of birth: 5 April 1995 (age 31)
- Place of birth: Itaboraí, Brazil
- Height: 1.84 m (6 ft 1/2 in)
- Position: Centre back

Team information
- Current team: América Mineiro
- Number: 2

Youth career
- Botafogo

Senior career*
Years	Team	Apps	(Gls)
2015–2017	Botafogo	36	(0)
2018–2021	Palmeiras	16	(0)
2018	→ Internacional (loan)	15	(1)
2021–2024	Kashiwa Reysol	10	(0)
2022–2023	→ Atlético Goianiense (loan)	24	(0)
2024	Inter de Limeira	12	(0)
2024–2025	Ponte Preta	51	(1)
2025–	América Mineiro	30	(1)
- * Club domestic league appearances and goals as of 18 November 2026

Emerson Raymundo Santos (born 5 April 1995), known as Emerson Santos or simply Emerson, is a Brazilian footballer who plays as a central defender for América Mineiro.

== Club career ==
Born in Itaboraí, Rio de Janeiro, Emerson represented Botafogo as a youth. He made his senior debut on 30 April 2015, starting in a 2–1 Copa do Brasil away win against Capivariano.

On 7 May 2015 Emerson was definitely promoted to the first team in Série B, but contributed with only one league match during the campaign, which ended in promotion as champions. On 8 December, he renewed his contract until the end of 2017.

Emerson became a regular starter in 2016, and scored his first senior goal on 28 February of that year, netting the equalizer through a direct free kick in a 1–1 draw at Vasco da Gama for the Campeonato Carioca championship. On 22 May he made his Série A debut, starting in a 1–1 away draw against Sport.

On August 16, 2017 he signed for Palmeiras.

== Career statistics ==
=== Club ===
As of 1 August 2024

Appearances and goals by club, season and competition
Club	Season	League			State league		National Cup		Continental		Other		Total	
Club	Season	Division	Apps	Goals	Apps	Goals	Apps	Goals	Apps	Goals	Apps	Goals	Apps	Goals
Botafogo	2014	Série A	—		0	0	—		—		—		0	0
Botafogo	2015	Série B	1	0	—		3	0	—		—		4	0
Botafogo	2016	Série A	30	0	10 (Note: Appearance(s) in Campeonato Carioca Série A1)	1	3	0	—		—		43	1
Botafogo	2017	Série A	5	0	—		4	0	5 (Note: Appearance(s) in Copa Libertadores)	0	—		14	0
Botafogo	Total		36	0	10	1	10	0	5	0	—		61	1
Palmeiras	2018	Série A	0	0	0	0	0	0	2	0	—		2	0
Palmeiras	2020	Série A	12	1	0	0	3	0	6	0	0	0	21	1
Palmeiras	Total		12	1	0	0	3	0	8	0	0	0	23	1
Internacional (loan)	2018	Série A	9	0	—		—		—		—		9	0
Internacional (loan)	2019	Série A	11	1	6 (Note: Appearance(s) in Campeonato Gaúcho Série A1)	1	2	0	0	0	—		19	2
Internacional (loan)	Total		20	1	6	1	2	0	0	0	—		28	2
Kashiwa Reysol	2021	J1 League	8	0	—		0	0	—		2 (Note: Appearance(s) in J.League Cup)	0	10	0
Kashiwa Reysol	2022	J1 League	0	0	—		0	0	—		0	0	0	0
Kashiwa Reysol	Total		8	0	—		0	0	—		2	0	10	0
Atlético Goianiense (loan)	2022	Série A	0	0	—		—		—		—		0	0
Atlético Goianiense (loan)	2023	Série B	14	0	10 (Note: Appearance(s) in Campeonato Goiano)	0	2	0	—		—		26	0
Atlético Goianiense (loan)	Total		14	0	10	0	2	0	—		—		26	0
Inter de Limeira	2024	Série D	—		12 (Note: Appearance(s) in Campeonato Paulista Série A1)	0	—		—		—		12	0
Ponte Preta	2024	Série B	14	1	—		—		—		—		14	1
Career Total			104	3	38	2	17	0	13	0	2	0	174	5

== Honours ==
=== Club ===
Botafogo

- Campeonato Brasileiro Série B: 2015

Palmeiras

- Campeonato Paulista: 2020
- Copa do Brasil: 2020
- Copa Libertadores: 2020
