= Vinícius Silvestre =

Brazilian footballer

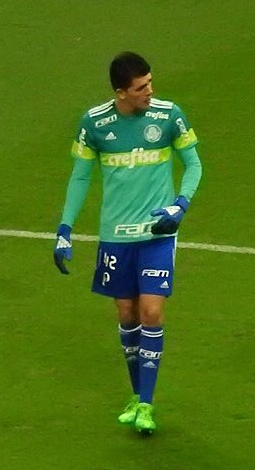
- Vinícius Silvestre with Palmeiras in 2017

Personal information
- Full name: Vinícius Silvestre da Costa
- Date of birth: 28 March 1994 (age 32)
- Place of birth: Guarulhos, Brazil
- Height: 1.95 m (6 ft 5 in)
- Position: Goalkeeper

Team information
- Current team: Fortaleza
- Number: 25

Youth career
- Palmeiras

Senior career*
Years	Team	Apps	(Gls)
2013–2023	Palmeiras	14	(0)
2018	→ Ponte Preta (loan)	1	(0)
2019	→ CRB (loan)	12	(0)
2023–2025	Portimonense	44	(0)
2025–	Fortaleza	2	(0)

International career
2009	Brazil U15		
- * Club domestic league appearances and goals as of 15 December 2025

Vinícius Silvestre da Costa (born 28 March 1994), known as Vinícius Silvestre or just Vinícius, is a Brazilian footballer who plays as a goalkeeper for Fortaleza.

== Career statistics ==
As of 1 December 2021.

Club	Season	League			State League		Cup		Continental		Other		Total	
Club	Season	Division	Apps	Goals	Apps	Goals	Apps	Goals	Apps	Goals	Apps	Goals	Apps	Goals
Palmeiras	2013	Série A	0	0	0	0	0	0	—		—		0	0
Palmeiras	2014	Série A	0	0	0	0	0	0	—		—		0	0
Palmeiras	2015	Série A	0	0	0	0	0	0	—		—		0	0
Palmeiras	2016	Série A	1	0	0	0	0	0	0	0	—		1	0
Palmeiras	2017	Série A	0	0	0	0	0	0	0	0	—		0	0
Palmeiras	2018	Série A	0	0	0	0	0	0	—		—		0	0
Palmeiras	2019	Série A	0	0	0	0	0	0	—		—		0	0
Palmeiras	2020	Série A	2	0	0	0	0	0	0	0	0	0	2	0
Palmeiras	2021	Série A	4	0	6 (Note: Appearance(s) in Campeonato Paulista)	0	0	0	0	0	0	0	10	0
Palmeiras	Total		7	0	6	0	0	0	0	0	0	0	13	0
Ponte Preta (loan)	2018	Série B	0	0	1	0	0	0	—		—		1	0
CRB (loan)	2019	Série B	12	0	0	0	0	0	—		0	0	12	0
Career total			13	0	1	0	0	0	0	0	0	0	14	0

== Honours ==
Palmeiras

- Campeonato Brasileiro Série B: 2013
- Campeonato Brasileiro Série A: 2016, 2022
- Campeonato Paulista: 2020, 2022, 2023
- Copa do Brasil: 2015, 2020
- Copa Libertadores: 2020, 2021
- Recopa Sudamericana: 2022
- Supercopa do Brasil: 2023

Ponte Preta

- Campeonato Paulista do Interior: 2018

Fortaleza

- Campeonato Cearense: 2026
