= 2024 Red Bull Bragantino season =

Red Bull Bragantino
2024 season
- Manager: Pedro Caixinha
- Stadium: Estádio Nabi Abi Chedid
- Série A: 16th
- Campeonato Paulista: Semi-finals
- Copa do Brasil: Round of 16
- Copa Sudamericana: Round of 16
- Top goalscorer: League: Helinho (7); All: Helinho (12)
- Biggest win: Red Bull Bragantino 3–0 Inter Limeira; Red Bull Bragantino 3–0 Sousa
- Biggest defeat: Racing Club 3–0 Red Bull Bragantino
Home colours	Away colours

The 2024 season was Red Bull Bragantino's 96th in existence and the fifth year in the top flight. They played in the Série A and the Campeonato Paulista and the Copa Sudamericana.

== Players ==
=== First-team squad ===
As of 5 September 2024.

Note: Flags indicate national team as defined under FIFA eligibility rules; some limited exceptions apply. Players may hold more than one non-FIFA nationality.

No.	Pos.	Nation	Player
1	GK	BRA	Cleiton (vice-captain)
3	DF	BRA	Eduardo Santos
4	DF	BRA	Lucas Cunha
5	MF	BRA	Jadsom
6	MF	BRA	Jhon Jhon
7	MF	BRA	Eric Ramires
8	MF	BRA	Lucas Evangelista
10	MF	BRA	Lincoln (on loan from Fenerbahçe)
13	DF	COL	Sergio Palacios
14	DF	BRA	Pedro Henrique
17	FW	ANG	Ivan Cavaleiro
18	FW	URU	Thiago Borbas
19	FW	BRA	Eduardo Sasha
21	MF	BRA	João Neto
22	FW	BRA	Gustavo Neves

No.	Pos.	Nation	Player
23	MF	BRA	Raul (captain)
27	FW	BRA	Arthur Sousa
28	FW	BRA	Vitinho (on loan from Dynamo Kyiv)
29	DF	BRA	Juninho Capixaba
30	FW	COL	Henry Mosquera
31	DF	BRA	Guilherme
34	DF	ECU	Andrés Hurtado
35	MF	BRA	Matheus Fernandes
36	DF	BRA	Luan Cândido
37	GK	BRA	Fabrício
39	DF	BRA	Douglas Mendes (on loan from Red Bull Salzburg)
40	GK	BRA	Lucão
45	DF	BRA	Nathan Mendes
54	FW	BRA	Vinicinho

=== Reserve team ===
Note: Flags indicate national team as defined under FIFA eligibility rules; some limited exceptions apply. Players may hold more than one non-FIFA nationality.

No.	Pos.	Nation	Player
12	GK	BRA	Rubens
13	MF	BRA	Alexandre Pena
15	MF	BRA	Gabriel Lopes
16	FW	BRA	Raí
20	DF	BRA	Isac
27	MF	BRA	Yuri Leles
32	DF	BRA	Riquelme
38	DF	BRA	Kevyn Monteiro
41	FW	COL	Kelvin Flórez
44	FW	BRA	Filipe
46	FW	BRA	João Tilápia

No.	Pos.	Nation	Player
48	MF	BRA	Nathan Camargo
51	MF	BRA	Marquinhos
53	MF	BRA	Chumbinho
55	MF	COL	Johan Caicedo (on loan from Deportivo Pasto)
56	GK	BRA	Gustavo Reis
57	DF	BRA	Danilo Ferreira
58	DF	BRA	Dija
59	FW	BRA	Juliano
—	DF	BRA	Henrique Halls
—	DF	BRA	Marcos Paulo (on loan from Nova Iguaçu)
—	FW	BRA	Kawê

== Competitions ==
=== Overall record ===
Competition	First match	Last match	Starting round	Final position	Record							
Competition	First match	Last match	Starting round	Final position	Pld	W	D	L	GF	GA	GD	Win %
Série A	13 April 2024	December 2024	Matchday 1	16th	38	10	14	14	44	48	−4	26.32
Campeonato Paulista	20 January 2024	27 March 2024	First stage	Semi-finals	14	7	3	4	17	12	+5	50.00
Copa do Brasil	1 May 2024		Third round	Round of 16	4	1	1	2	6	6	+0	25.00
Copa Libertadores	20 February 2024	13 March 2024	Second stage	Third stage	4	0	3	1	2	3	−1	0.00
Copa Sudamericana	3 April 2024		Second stage	Round of 16	10	6	2	2	16	14	+2	60.00
Total					70	24	23	23	85	83	+2	34.29

Source: Soccerway

=== Série A ===
==== League table ====
Pos	Team	Pld	W	D	L	GF	GA	GD	Pts	Qualification or relegation
14	Grêmio	38	12	9	17	44	50	−6	45	Qualification for Copa Sudamericana group stage
15	Juventude	38	11	12	15	48	59	−11	45	
16	Red Bull Bragantino	38	10	14	14	44	48	−4	44	
17	Athletico Paranaense (R)	38	11	9	18	40	46	−6	42	Relegation to Campeonato Brasileiro Série B
18	Criciúma (R)	38	9	11	18	42	61	−19	38	Relegation to Campeonato Brasileiro Série B

Source: CBF
Rules for classification: 1) points; 2) wins; 3) goal difference; 4) goals scored; 5) head-to-head results (only between two teams); 6) fewest red cards; 7) fewest yellow cards; 8) drawing of lots.
(R) Relegated

==== Results summary ====
Overall								Home						Away					
Pld	W	D	L	GF	GA	GD	Pts	W	D	L	GF	GA	GD	W	D	L	GF	GA	GD
31	8	10	13	34	40	−6	34	7	4	4	20	16	+4	1	6	9	14	24	−10

Last updated: 21 July 2024.

==== Results by round ====
Round	1
Ground	
Result	
Position	

Updated to match(es) played on 21 July 2024. Source:
A = Away; H = Home; W = Win; D = Draw; L = Loss

==== Matches ====
The match schedule was released on 29 February.

14 April 2024 1	Fluminense	2–2	Red Bull Bragantino	Rio de Janeiro

18 April 2024 2	Red Bull Bragantino	2–1	Vasco da Gama	Bragança Paulista
				Stadium: Estádio Nabi Abi Chedid

21 April 2024 3	Red Bull Bragantino	1–0	Corinthians	Bragança Paulista
				Stadium: Estádio Nabi Abi Chedid

28 April 2024 4	Fortaleza	1–1	Red Bull Bragantino	Fortaleza
				Stadium: Castelão

4 May 2024 5	Red Bull Bragantino	1–1	Flamengo	Bragança Paulista
				Stadium: Estádio Nabi Abi Chedid

12 May 2024 6	Bahia	1–0	Red Bull Bragantino	Salvador
				Stadium: Arena Fonte Nova

1 June 2024 7	Grêmio	0–2	Red Bull Bragantino	Curitiba
16:00				Stadium: Estádio Couto Pereira

12 June 2024 8	Red Bull Bragantino	1–2	Atlético Mineiro	Bragança Paulista
				Stadium: Estádio Nabi Abi Chedid

15 June 2024 9	Red Bull Bragantino	2–1	Juventude	Bragança Paulista
				Stadium: Estádio Nabi Abi Chedid

20 June 2024 10	Palmeiras	2–1	Red Bull Bragantino	São Paulo
21:30				Stadium: Allianz Parque; Referee: Anderson Daronco

23 June 2024 11	Red Bull Bragantino	2–1	Vitória	Bragança Paulista
				Stadium: Estádio Nabi Abi Chedid

26 June 2024 12	Botafogo	2–1	Red Bull Bragantino	Rio de Janeiro
19:00 UTC−3	Carlos Eduardo 21', 52'; Fernando Marçal (yellow card) 45'; Halter (yellow card) 68'		Evangelista 6'; Helinho (yellow card) 45'; Lincoln (yellow card) 52'; Pedro Henrique (yellow card) 76'	Stadium: Estádio Nilton Santos; Attendance: 13,333; Referee: Gustavo Ervino Bauermann

4 July 2024 14	Red Bull Bragantino	3–1	Atlético Goianiense	Bragança Paulista
				Stadium: Estádio Nabi Abi Chedid

7 July 2024 15	São Paulo	2–0	Red Bull Bragantino	São Paulo
				Stadium: Estádio do Morumbi

13 July 2024 17	Cruzeiro	2–1	Red Bull Bragantino	Belo Horizonte
				Stadium: Mineirão

21 July 2024 18	Red Bull Bragantino	1–0	Athletico Paranaense	Bragança Paulista
				Stadium: Estádio Nabi Abi Chedid

28 July 2024 20	Red Bull Bragantino	0–1	Fluminense	Bragança Paulista
				Stadium: Estádio Nabi Abi Chedid

4 August 2024 21	Vasco da Gama	2–2	Red Bull Bragantino	Rio de Janeiro
				Stadium: São Januário

11 August 2024 22	Corinthians	1–1	Red Bull Bragantino

17 August 2024 23	Red Bull Bragantino	1–2	Fortaleza	Bragança Paulista
				Stadium: Estádio Nabi Abi Chedid

26 August 2024 24	Flamengo	2–1	Red Bull Bragantino

29 August 2024 19	Criciúma	1–0	Red Bull Bragantino

1 September 2024 25	Red Bull Bragantino	2–1	Bahia	Bragança Paulista
				Stadium: Estádio Nabi Abi Chedid

15 September 2024 26	Red Bull Bragantino	2–2	Grêmio	Bragança Paulista
				Stadium: Estádio Nabi Abi Chedid

22 September 2024 27	Atlético Mineiro	3–0	Red Bull Bragantino	Belo Horizonte
				Stadium: Arena MRV

26 September 2024 16	Red Bull Bragantino	2–2	Internacional	Bragança Paulista
				Stadium: Estádio Nabi Abi Chedid

29 September 2024 28	Juventude	1–1	Red Bull Bragantino	Caxias do Sul
				Stadium: Estádio Alfredo Jaconi

5 October 2024 29	Red Bull Bragantino	0–0	Palmeiras	Bragança Paulista
				Stadium: Estádio Nabi Abi Chedid

19 October 2024 30	Vitória	1–0	Red Bull Bragantino	Salvador

26 October 2024 31	Red Bull Bragantino	0–1	Botafogo	Bragança Paulista
19:00	Jadsom (yellow card) 58'		Gregore 86'; Bastos (yellow card) 90+4'	Stadium: Estádio Nabi Abi Chedid; Referee: Anderson Daronco

=== Copa do Brasil ===
==== Round of 16 ====
31 July 2024 First leg	Athletico Paranaense	2–0	Red Bull Bragantino	Curitiba
19:00 UTC−3				Stadium: Arena da Baixada

7 August 2024 Second leg	Red Bull Bragantino	2–3 (2–5 agg.)	Athletico Paranaense	Bragança Paulista
19:00 UTC−3				Stadium: Estádio Nabi Abi Chedid

=== Copa Libertadores ===
20 February 2024 First leg	Águilas Doradas (Colombia)	0–0	(Brazil) Red Bull Bragantino	Medellín, Colombia (Note: Águilas Doradas played their home match at Estadio Atanasio Girardot, Medellín (originally scheduled at Estadio El Campín, Bogotá) instead of their regular stadium Estadio Alberto Grisales, Rionegro which did not meet CONMEBOL requirements.)
19:30 UTC−5		Report		Stadium: Estadio Atanasio Girardot; Referee: Gustavo Tejera (Uruguay)

27 February 2024 Second leg	Red Bull Bragantino (Brazil)	0–0 (0–0 agg.) (4–3 p)	(Colombia) Águilas Doradas	Bragança Paulista
21:30 UTC−3		Report		Stadium: Estádio Nabi Abi Chedid; Attendance: 4,115; Referee: Piero Maza (Chile)
	Penalties
	Lincoln (penalty scored); Nathan (penalty scored); Luan Cândido (penalty scored); Léo Ortiz (penalty scored)		(penalty missed) Salazar; (penalty scored) Pineda; (penalty scored) Garavito; (penalty scored) Quiñónes; (penalty missed) Góez

==== Third stage ====
6 March 2024 First leg	Botafogo (Brazil)	2–1	(Brazil) Red Bull Bragantino	Rio de Janeiro
21:30 UTC−3	Júnior Santos 44', 73'	Report	Juninho Capixaba 45+2'	Stadium: Estádio Olímpico Nilton Santos; Attendance: 33,433; Referee: Gustavo Tejera (Uruguay)

13 March 2024 Second leg	Red Bull Bragantino (Brazil)	1–1 (2–3 agg.)	(Brazil) Botafogo	Bragança Paulista
21:30 UTC−3	Talisson 86'	Report	Júnior Santos 76'	Stadium: Estádio Nabi Abi Chedid; Attendance: 8,300; Referee: Wilmar Roldán (Colombia)

=== Copa Sudamericana ===
==== Group stage ====
The draw was held on 18 March 2024.

Pos	Team	Pld	W	D	L	GF	GA	GD	Pts	Qualification	RAC	RBB	COQ	SLU
1	(Argentina) Racing	6	5	0	1	14	3	+11	15	Advance to round of 16	—	3–0	3–0	3–0
2	(Brazil) Red Bull Bragantino	6	4	1	1	9	8	+1	13	Advance to knockout round play-offs	2–1	—	1–0	2–1
3	(Chile) Coquimbo Unido	6	1	2	3	3	7	−4	5		1–2	1–1	—	1–0
4	(Paraguay) Sportivo Luqueño	6	0	1	5	3	11	−8	1		0–2	2–3	0–0	—

Source: CONMEBOL
Rules for classification: 1) Points; 2) Goal difference; 3) Goals scored; 4) Away goals scored; 5) CONMEBOL ranking.

3 April 2024 1	Red Bull Bragantino (Brazil)	1–0	(Chile) Coquimbo Unido	Bragança Paulista
21:00 UTC−3	Vitinho 45+4'	Report		Stadium: Estádio Nabi Abi Chedid; Attendance: 3,685; Referee: Ivo Méndez (Bolivia)

10 April 2024 2	Racing (Argentina)	3–0	(Brazil) Red Bull Bragantino	Avellaneda, Argentina
21:30 UTC−3	Salas 2'; A. Martínez 20'; R. Martínez 90+2'	Report		Stadium: El Cilindro; Attendance: 19,826; Referee: Alexis Herrera (Venezuela)

24 April 2024 3	Red Bull Bragantino (Brazil)	2–1	(Paraguay) Sportivo Luqueño	Bragança Paulista
21:00 UTC−3	Borbas 28'; Gustavinho 47'	Report	Ferreira 76'	Stadium: Estádio Nabi Abi Chedid; Attendance: 3,654; Referee: Bryan Loayza (Ecuador)

9 May 2024 4	Red Bull Bragantino (Brazil)	2–1	(Argentina) Racing	Bragança Paulista
21:00 UTC−3	Borbas 5', 7'	Report	Solari 25'	Stadium: Estádio Nabi Abi Chedid; Attendance: 4,850; Referee: Kevin Ortega (Peru)

16 May 2024 5	Sportivo Luqueño (Paraguay)	2–3	(Brazil) Red Bull Bragantino	Asunción, Paraguay
20:00 UTC−4	Ferreira 3'; Leguizamón 37'	Report	Helinho 15', 80'; Lincoln 74'	Stadium: Estadio Defensores del Chaco; Attendance: 448; Referee: Augusto Aragón (Ecuador)

28 May 2024 6	Coquimbo Unido (Chile)	1–1	(Brazil) Red Bull Bragantino	Coquimbo, Chile
20:30 UTC−4	Chávez 41'	Report	Helinho 90+8' (pen.)	Stadium: Estadio Municipal Francisco Sánchez Rumoroso; Referee: Alex Cajas (Ecuador)

==== Knockout round play-offs ====
17 July 2024 (Note: Both legs of Play-off Match A, originally scheduled for 16 and 23 July, were moved to 17 and 24 July.)	Barcelona (Ecuador)	1–1	(Brazil) Red Bull Bragantino	Guayaquil, Ecuador
19:30 UTC−5	Corozo 31'	Report	Helinho 18'	Stadium: Estadio Monumental Isidro Romero Carbo; Attendance: 6,767; Referee: Maximiliano Ramírez (Argentina)

24 July 2024	Red Bull Bragantino (Brazil)	3–2	(Ecuador) Barcelona	Bragança Paulista
21:30 UTC−3	Borbas 22'; Lincoln 46'; Jhon Jhon 86'	Report	Preciado 7'; Oyola 44'	Stadium: Estádio Nabi Abi Chedid; Attendance: 4,368; Referee: Alexis Herrera (Venezuela)

==== Round of 16 ====
13 August 2024 First leg	Red Bull Bragantino (Brazil)	1–2	(Brazil) Corinthians	Ribeirão Preto
21:30 UTC−3				Stadium: Estádio Santa Cruz; Referee: Piero Maza (Chile)

20 August 2024 Seconc leg	Corinthians (Brazil)	1–2 (3–3 agg.) (5–4 p)	(Brazil) Red Bull Bragantino	São Paulo
21:30 UTC−3				Stadium: Arena Corinthians; Referee: Andres Rojac (Colombia)
