= 2025 Campeonato Brasileiro Série A =

Football league

Campeonato Brasileiro Série A
- Season: 2025
- Dates: 29 March – 7 December 2025
- Champions: Flamengo (8th title)
- Relegated: Ceará; Fortaleza; Juventude; Sport
- Copa Libertadores: Flamengo (via Copa Libertadores); Corinthians (via Copa do Brasil); Palmeiras; Cruzeiro; Mirassol; Fluminense; Botafogo; Bahia
- Copa Sudamericana: São Paulo; Grêmio; Red Bull Bragantino; Atlético Mineiro; Santos; Vasco da Gama
- Matches: 380
- Goals: 959 (2.52 per match)
- Top goalscorer: Kaio Jorge (21 goals)
- Biggest home win: Flamengo 8–0 Vitória (25 August)
- Biggest away win: Santos 0–6 Vasco da Gama (17 August)
- Highest scoring: Flamengo 8–0 Vitória (25 August)
- Longest winning run: 5 games São Paulo
- Longest unbeaten run: 12 games Flamengo
- Longest winless run: 16 games Sport
- Longest losing run: 11 games Sport
- Average attendance: 26,222

The 2025 Campeonato Brasileiro Série A (officially the Brasileirão Betano 2025 for sponsorship reasons) was the 69th season of the Campeonato Brasileiro Série A, the top level of professional football in Brazil, and the 23rd edition in a double round-robin since its establishment in 2003. The competition began on 29 March and ended on 7 December 2025.

Flamengo were the champions, clinching their ninth league title on the penultimate matchday of the season after defeating Ceará 1–0 on 3 December 2025. The top six teams as well as the 2025 Copa do Brasil champions qualified for the Copa Libertadores. Meanwhile, the next six best-placed teams not qualified for Copa Libertadores qualified for the Copa Sudamericana, and the last four were relegated to Série B for 2026.

Botafogo were the defending champions, having won their third title in the previous season.

== Teams ==
Twenty teams competed in the league: the top 16 teams from the previous season and four teams promoted from the Série B.

Santos became the first club to be promoted on 11 November 2024 after a 2–0 win over Coritiba. Mirassol, Sport and Ceará all achieved promotion in the last round, on 24 November.

Location of teams in 2025 Série A

Pos.	Relegated from 2024 Série A
17th	Athletico Paranaense
18th	Criciúma
19th	Atlético Goianiense
20th	Cuiabá

Pos.	Promoted from 2024 Série B
1st	Santos
2nd	Mirassol
3rd	Sport
4th	Ceará

=== Number of teams by state ===
N.T.	State	Team(s)
6	São Paulo	Corinthians, Mirassol, Palmeiras, Red Bull Bragantino, Santos and São Paulo
4	Rio de Janeiro	Botafogo, Flamengo, Fluminense and Vasco da Gama
3	Rio Grande do Sul	Grêmio, Internacional and Juventude
2	Bahia	Bahia and Vitória
2	Ceará	Ceará and Fortaleza
2	Minas Gerais	Atlético Mineiro and Cruzeiro
1	Pernambuco	Sport

=== Stadiums and locations ===
Team	Location	State	Stadium	Turf	Capacity
Atlético Mineiro	Belo Horizonte	Minas Gerais	Arena MRV	Artificial	44,892
Bahia	Salvador	Bahia	Casa de Apostas Arena Fonte Nova	Natural	49,500
Botafogo	Rio de Janeiro	Rio de Janeiro	Olímpico Nilton Santos	Artificial	44,661
Ceará	Fortaleza	Ceará	Castelão	Natural	57,876
Corinthians	São Paulo	São Paulo	Neo Química Arena	Hybrid	47,252
Cruzeiro	Belo Horizonte	Minas Gerais	Mineirão	Natural	66,658
Flamengo	Rio de Janeiro	Rio de Janeiro	Maracanã	Hybrid	78,838
Fluminense	Rio de Janeiro	Rio de Janeiro	Maracanã	Hybrid	78,838
Fortaleza	Fortaleza	Ceará	Castelão	Natural	57,876
Grêmio	Porto Alegre	Rio Grande do Sul	Arena do Grêmio	Hybrid	60,540
Internacional	Porto Alegre	Rio Grande do Sul	Beira-Rio	Natural	49,055
Juventude	Caxias do Sul	Rio Grande do Sul	Alfredo Jaconi	Natural	19,924
Mirassol	Mirassol	São Paulo	Campos Maia	Natural	14,534
Palmeiras	São Paulo	São Paulo	Allianz Parque	Artificial	43,713
Red Bull Bragantino	Bragança Paulista	São Paulo	Cícero de Souza Marques	Natural	12,000
Santos	Santos	São Paulo	Vila Belmiro	Natural	16,068
São Paulo	São Paulo	São Paulo	MorumBIS	Natural	66,671
Sport	Recife	Pernambuco	Ilha do Retiro	Natural	32,983
Vasco da Gama	Rio de Janeiro	Rio de Janeiro	São Januário	Natural	24,584
Vitória	Salvador	Bahia	Barradão	Natural	30,793

== Personnel and kits ==
Team	Head coach	Captain	Kit manufacturer	Main sponsor	Other sponsors
Atlético Mineiro	(Argentina) Jorge Sampaoli	(Paraguay) Júnior Alonso	Adidas	H2Bet	List: Front: Multimarcas Consórcios, Vilma Alimentos; Back: Galo BMG, Supermercados BH; Sleeves: Gerdau; Shorts: Auto Truck, ABC da Construção; Socks: None; Number: Mundiale
Bahia	(Brazil) Rogério Ceni	(Brazil) Éverton Ribeiro	Puma	Viva Sorte Bet	List: Front: Atacadão Dos Pisos, Viva Sorte Bet; Back: None; Sleeves: Canaã Alimentos; Shorts: ITS Brasil, Axi; Socks: UniCesumar; Number: None
Botafogo	(Italy) Davide Ancelotti	(Brazil) Marlon Freitas	Reebok	Vbet	List: Front: None; Back: None; Sleeves: Centrum; Shorts: None; Socks: LifeFit; Number: None
Ceará	(Brazil) Léo Condé	(Brazil) Luiz Otávio	Vozão (Note: Club-manufactured kit)	Esportes da Sorte	List: Front: Viva Ceará, Giga+Fibra; Back: Matrix Energia, Unimed Fortaleza; Sleeves: Transceará; Shorts: Transceará, SP Combustíveis, Sankhya; Socks: None; Number: Voke
Corinthians	(Brazil) Dorival Júnior	(Paraguay) Ángel Romero	Nike	Esportes da Sorte	List: Front: Appgas; Back: EZZE Seguros, AREA Material Elétrico; Sleeves: Banco BMG; Shorts: UniCesumar; Socks: KSK Consórcio; Number: None
Cruzeiro	(Portugal) Leonardo Jardim	(Brazil) Lucas Silva	Adidas	Betfair	List: Front: CIMED, Perdigão Na Brasa; Back: Vilma Alimentos, Supermercados BH; Sleeves: Surf; Shorts: Betfair; Socks: Kodilar Alimentos; Number: MM Aluguel de Carros
Flamengo	(Brazil) Filipe Luís	(Brazil) Bruno Henrique	Adidas	Betano	List: Front: BRB; Back: Hapvida, Assist Card; Sleeves: Shopee; Shorts: ABC da Construção; Socks: Zé Delivery; Number: Texaco
Fluminense	(Argentina) Luis Zubeldía	(Brazil) Thiago Silva	Umbro	Superbet	List: Front: Frescatto; Back: Universidade Iguaçu; Sleeves: Zinzane; Shorts: None; Socks: None; Number: Predialnet
Fortaleza	(Argentina) Martín Palermo	(Brazil) Tinga	Volt Sport	Cassino.Bet	List: Front: Viva Fortaleza, Banco Inter, Giga+ Fibra; Back: Unimed Fortaleza; Sleeves: None; Shorts: Matrix Fitness; Socks: Tecla T, Hantec Markets, SP Combustíveis; Number: Ftrade Brasil
Grêmio	(Brazil) Mano Menezes	(Argentina) Walter Kannemann	Umbro	Alfa / Energia Bet	List: Front: Pix das Estrelas / Tintas Coral; Back: Banrisul, Unimed; Sleeves: Vero; Shorts: None; Socks: None; Number: Marquespan
Internacional	(Brazil) Abel Braga	(Brazil) Alan Patrick	Adidas	Alfa	List: Front: None; Back: Banrisul, Unimed; Sleeves: Vero Banrisul; Shorts: Zé Delivery; Socks: None; Number: Marquespan
Juventude	(Brazil) Thiago Carpini	(Brazil) Jadson	19treze	Stake.com	List: Front: Randon Corp, Ademicon; Back: RodOil, Humana Saúde; Sleeves: None; Shorts: None; Socks: None; Number: None
Mirassol	(Brazil) Rafael Guanaes	(Brazil) Gabriel	Athleta	Guaraná Poty	List: Front: Ruiz Coffees, Ecori, Bet7K, Cozimax, Back: Rede Sol Supermercados, Pacaembu Construtora, Industrias Santa Maria, DS Tecnologia Automotiva, Ecori; Sleeves: Kodilar Alimentos; Shorts: RedeSol Supermercados, Bet7k, Lumavi; Socks: Lumavi; Number: Mtech
Palmeiras	(Portugal) Abel Ferreira	(Paraguay) Gustavo Gómez	Puma	Sportingbet	List: Front: Avanti; Back: Grupo Fictor; Sleeves: Sil; Shorts: UNIASSELVI; Socks: None; Number: Sportingbet
Red Bull Bragantino	(Brazil) Vagner Mancini	(Brazil) Cleiton	Puma	Red Bull	List: Front: None; Back: Red Bull, Asaas, Betfast; Sleeves: Betfast; Shorts: None; Socks: None; Number: None
Santos	(Argentina) Juan Pablo Vojvoda	(Brazil) Neymar	Umbro	Bet7K	List: Front: Canção Alimentos, Farmácias Nissei, Havan; Back: Viva Sorte, Placo; Sleeves: Kicaldo; Shorts: Next10 Nutrition, UNIASSELVI; Socks: Pague Safe; Number: Loovi Seguros
São Paulo	(Argentina) Hernán Crespo	(Argentina) Jonathan Calleri	New Balance	Superbet	List: Front: Ademicon, Elgin; Back: Superbet, Blue Plano de Saúde; Sleeves: None; Shorts: ABC da Construção; Socks: None; Number: eFootball
Sport	(Brazil) César Lucena (caretaker)	(Brazil) Rafael Thyere	Umbro	Betnacional	List: Front: Hebron, Moura Dubeux; Back: Betnacional, Somar Special Care; Sleeves: Z.RO Bank; Shorts: None; Socks: None; Number: Imply
Vasco da Gama	(Brazil) Fernando Diniz	(Argentina) Pablo Vegetti	Kappa	Betfair	List: Front: Viva Sorte; Back: Banco BMG, Betfair; Sleeves: Zé Delivery; Shorts: Viva Sorte, Intermac Assistance; Socks: Consórcio Tradição; Number: R10 Score
Vitória	(Brazil) Jair Ventura	(Paraguay) Raúl Cáceres	Volt Sport	Bet7K	List: Front: Viva Sorte, Fatal Model, Atacadão Pisos; Back: None; Sleeves: None; Shorts: ITS Brasil; Socks: None; Number: Grupo SBS

=== Coaching changes ===
Team	Outgoing head coach	Manner of departure	Date of vacancy	Position in table	Incoming head coach	Date of appointment	Ref
Santos	(Brazil) Leandro Zago	End of caretaker spell	22 November 2024	Pre-season	(Portugal) Pedro Caixinha	23 December 2024	
Mirassol	(Brazil) Mozart	Contract ended	26 November 2024	Pre-season	(Brazil) Eduardo Barroca	17 December 2024	
Atlético Mineiro	(Brazil) Lucas Gonçalves	End of caretaker spell	8 December 2024	Pre-season	(Brazil) Cuca	29 December 2024	
Vasco da Gama	(Brazil) Felipe	End of caretaker spell	8 December 2024	Pre-season	(Brazil) Fábio Carille	19 December 2024	
Grêmio	(Brazil) Renato Gaúcho	Contract ended	9 December 2024	Pre-season	(Bolivia) Gustavo Quinteros	28 December 2024	
Botafogo	(Portugal) Artur Jorge	Signed by Al-Rayyan	3 January 2025	Pre-season	(Brazil) Carlos Leiria (caretaker)	5 January 2025	
Cruzeiro	(Brazil) Fernando Diniz	Sacked	27 January 2025	State leagues	(Brazil) Wesley Carvalho (caretaker)	27 January 2025	
Cruzeiro	(Brazil) Wesley Carvalho	End of caretaker spell	9 February 2025	State leagues	(Portugal) Leonardo Jardim	4 February 2025	
Botafogo	(Brazil) Carlos Leiria	End of caretaker spell	13 February 2025	State leagues	(Brazil) Cláudio Caçapa (caretaker)	13 February 2025	
Mirassol	(Brazil) Eduardo Barroca	Mutual agreement	21 February 2025	State leagues	(Brazil) Ivan Baitello (caretaker)	21 February 2025	
Botafogo	(Brazil) Cláudio Caçapa	End of caretaker spell	28 February 2025	State leagues	(Portugal) Renato Paiva	28 February 2025	
Mirassol	(Brazil) Ivan Baitello	End of caretaker spell	13 March 2025	State leagues	(Brazil) Rafael Guanaes	13 March 2025	
Fluminense	(Brazil) Mano Menezes	Sacked	30 March 2025	19th	(Brazil) Marcão (caretaker)	30 March 2025	
Fluminense	(Brazil) Marcão	End of caretaker spell	3 April 2025	19th	(Brazil) Renato Gaúcho	3 April 2025	
Santos	(Portugal) Pedro Caixinha	Sacked	14 April 2025	18th	(Brazil) César Sampaio (caretaker)	14 April 2025	
Grêmio	(Bolivia) Gustavo Quinteros	Sacked	16 April 2025	17th	(Brazil) James Freitas (caretaker)	17 April 2025	
Corinthians	(Argentina) Ramón Díaz	Sacked	17 April 2025	13th	(Brazil) Orlando Ribeiro (caretaker)	17 April 2025	
Grêmio	(Brazil) James Freitas	End of caretaker spell	21 April 2025	18th	(Brazil) Mano Menezes	21 April 2025	
Vasco da Gama	(Brazil) Fábio Carille	Sacked	27 April 2025	11th	(Brazil) Felipe (caretaker)	27 April 2025	
Corinthians	(Brazil) Orlando Ribeiro	End of caretaker spell	28 April 2025	12th	(Brazil) Dorival Júnior	28 April 2025	
Santos	(Brazil) César Sampaio	End of caretaker spell	29 April 2025	19th	(Brazil) Cleber Xavier	29 April 2025	
Sport	(Portugal) Pepa	Sacked	3 May 2025	20th	(Portugal) António Oliveira	9 May 2025	
Vasco da Gama	(Brazil) Felipe	End of caretaker spell	10 May 2025	17th	(Brazil) Fernando Diniz	9 May 2025	
Juventude	(Brazil) Fábio Matias	Mutual agreement	11 May 2025	18th	(Brazil) Cláudio Tencati	13 May 2025	
Sport	(Portugal) António Oliveira	Sacked	4 June 2025	20th	(Brazil) Daniel Paulista	7 June 2025	
São Paulo	(Argentina) Luis Zubeldía	Mutual agreement	16 June 2025	14th	(Argentina) Hernán Crespo	18 June 2025	
Botafogo	(Portugal) Renato Paiva	Sacked	30 June 2025	8th	(Italy) Davide Ancelotti (Note: Cláudio Caçapa was the caretaker head coach in the 13th round against Vasco as Ancelotti was not registered on time.)	8 July 2025	
Vitória	(Brazil) Thiago Carpini	Sacked	9 July 2025	16th	(Brazil) Fábio Carille	9 July 2025	
Fortaleza	(Argentina) Juan Pablo Vojvoda	Sacked	14 July 2025	18th	(Portugal) Renato Paiva	17 July 2025	
Juventude	(Brazil) Cláudio Tencati	Sacked	29 July 2025	19th	(Brazil) Gerson Ramos (caretaker)	1 August 2025	
Juventude	(Brazil) Gerson Ramos	End of caretaker spell	4 August 2025	19th	(Brazil) Thiago Carpini	4 August 2025	
Santos	(Brazil) Cleber Xavier	Sacked	17 August 2025	15th	(Argentina) Juan Pablo Vojvoda (Note: Matheus Bachi was the interim head coach in the 21st round against Bahia.)	22 August 2025	
Vitória	(Brazil) Fábio Carille	Sacked	25 August 2025	17th	(Brazil) Rodrigo Chagas (Note: Originally as caretaker head coach, appointed on a permanent basis on 3 September 2025.)	26 August 2025	
Atlético Mineiro	(Brazil) Cuca	Sacked	29 August 2025	12th	(Brazil) Lucas Gonçalves (caretaker)	29 August 2025	
Fortaleza	(Portugal) Renato Paiva	Sacked	2 September 2025	19th	(Argentina) Martín Palermo	3 September 2025	
Atlético Mineiro	(Brazil) Lucas Gonçalves	End of caretaker spell	2 September 2025	14th	(Argentina) Jorge Sampaoli	2 September 2025	
Internacional	(Brazil) Roger Machado	Sacked	21 September 2025	13th	(Argentina) Ramón Díaz	24 September 2025	
Fluminense	(Brazil) Renato Gaúcho	Resigned	24 September 2025	8th	(Argentina) Luis Zubeldía (Note: Marcão was the interim head coach in the 25th round against Botafogo.)	25 September 2025	
Vitória	(Brazil) Rodrigo Chagas	Demoted to assistant coach	24 September 2025	17th	(Brazil) Jair Ventura	24 September 2025	
Red Bull Bragantino	(Brazil) Fernando Seabra	Sacked	27 October 2025	12th	(Brazil) Vagner Mancini	30 October 2025	
Sport	(Brazil) Daniel Paulista	Sacked	28 October 2025	20th	(Brazil) César Lucena (caretaker) (Note: Caretaker head coach until the end of the season.)	28 October 2025	
Internacional	(Argentina) Ramón Díaz	Sacked	29 November 2025	17th	(Brazil) Abel Braga	29 November 2025	

== Foreign players ==
The clubs can have a maximum of nine foreign players in their Campeonato Brasileiro squads per match, but there is no limit of foreigners in the clubs' squads.

- Players marked in **bold** indicate they are registered during mid-season transfer window.
- Players marked in italics indicate they had left their respective clubs during mid-season transfer window.

Club	Player 1	Player 2	Player 3	Player 4	Player 5	Player 6	Player 7	Player 8	Player 9	Player 10	Player 11	Player 12	Former players
Atlético Mineiro	(Argentina) Fausto Vera	(Argentina) Renzo Saravia	(Argentina) Tomás Cuello	(Chile) Iván Román	(Ecuador) Alan Franco	(Paraguay) Júnior Alonso							(Colombia) Brahian Palacios
Bahia	(Argentina) **Mateo Sanabria**	(Argentina) Santiago Ramos Mingo	(Colombia) Santiago Arias	(Uruguay) Michel Araújo	(Uruguay) Nicolás Acevedo								(Uruguay) Luciano Rodríguez
Botafogo	(Angola) Bastos	(Argentina) Alexander Barboza	(Argentina) **Álvaro Montoro**	(Argentina) **Joaquín Correa**	(Colombia) **Jordan Barrera**	(Ecuador) **Cristhian Loor**	(Panama) **Kadir Barría**	(Spain) **Chris Ramos**	(Uruguay) Gonzalo Mastriani	(Uruguay) Mateo Ponte	(Uruguay) Santiago Rodríguez	(Venezuela) Jefferson Savarino	
Ceará	(Argentina) Lucas Mugni	(Paraguay) Antonio Galeano	(Portugal) Rafael Ramos										(Argentina) Alejandro Martínez (Paraguay) Jorge Recalde
Corinthians	(Argentina) Fabrizio Angileri	(Argentina) Rodrigo Garro	(Ecuador) Félix Torres	(Netherlands) Memphis Depay	(Paraguay) Ángel Romero	(Peru) André Carrillo	(Spain) Héctor Hernández	(Venezuela) José Andrés Martínez					(Ecuador) Diego Palacios
Cruzeiro	(Argentina) Lucas Romero	(Argentina) Lucas Villalba	(Colombia) **Luis Sinisterra**	(Democratic Republic of the Congo) Yannick Bolasie	(Ecuador) **Keny Arroyo**	(Paraguay) Mateo Gamarra							(Argentina) Juan Dinenno (Argentina) Lautaro Díaz
Flamengo	(Argentina) Agustín Rossi	(Chile) Erick Pulgar	(Colombia) **Jorge Carrascal**	(Ecuador) Gonzalo Plata	(Spain) **Saúl Ñíguez**	(Uruguay) Giorgian de Arrascaeta	(Uruguay) Guillermo Varela	(Uruguay) Matías Viña	(Uruguay) Nicolás de la Cruz				(Nigeria) Shola Ogundana
Fluminense	(Argentina) Germán Cano	(Argentina) Juan Pablo Freytes	(Argentina) **Luciano Acosta**	(Colombia) Gabriel Fuentes	(Colombia) Kevin Serna	(Colombia) **Santiago Moreno**	(Paraguay) Rubén Lezcano	(Uruguay) Agustín Canobbio	(Uruguay) Facundo Bernal	(Uruguay) Joaquín Lavega	(Venezuela) **Yeferson Soteldo**		(Colombia) Jhon Arias
Fortaleza	(Argentina) Emanuel Brítez	(Argentina) Emmanuel Martínez	(Argentina) Eros Mancuso	(Argentina) Gastón Ávila	(Argentina) **José María Herrera**	(Argentina) Juan Martín Lucero	(Argentina) Tomás Pochettino	(Chile) Benjamín Kuscevic	(Colombia) **Yeison Guzmán**	(Paraguay) **Adam Bareiro**			(Argentina) Pol Fernández (Colombia) Dylan Borrero (Venezuela) Kervin Andrade
Grêmio	(Argentina) Cristian Pavon	(Argentina) Franco Cristaldo	(Argentina) Walter Kannemann	(Belgium) Francis Amuzu	(Chile) Alexander Aravena	(Colombia) Gustavo Cuéllar	(Colombia) Miguel Monsalve	(Denmark) Martin Braithwaite	(Paraguay) **Fabián Balbuena**	(Paraguay) Mathías Villasanti	(Peru) **Erick Noriega**	(Uruguay) Cristian Olivera	(Uruguay) Matías Arezo
Internacional	(Argentina) Alexandro Bernabei	(Argentina) Braian Aguirre	(Argentina) Gabriel Mercado	(Colombia) Johan Carbonero	(Colombia) Rafael Santos Borré	(Paraguay) **Alan Benítez**	(Paraguay) Óscar Romero	(Uruguay) **Alan Rodríguez**	(Uruguay) Sergio Rochet				(Ecuador) Enner Valencia (Uruguay) Agustín Rogel
Juventude	(Argentina) **Juan Sforza**	(Colombia) Daniel Giraldo	(Colombia) Emerson Batalla	(Uruguay) **Gastón Guruceaga**	(Venezuela) Wilker Ángel								
Mirassol													
Palmeiras	(Argentina) Agustín Giay	(Argentina) Aníbal Moreno	(Argentina) José Manuel López	(Paraguay) Gustavo Gómez	(Paraguay) **Ramón Sosa**	(Uruguay) Emiliano Martínez	(Uruguay) Facundo Torres	(Uruguay) Joaquín Piquerez					(Colombia) Richard Ríos
Red Bull Bragantino	(Colombia) Henry Mosquera	(Colombia) Sergio Palacios	(Ecuador) José Hurtado	(Paraguay) Isidro Pitta	(Uruguay) Agustín Sant'Anna	(Uruguay) Guzmán Rodríguez	(Uruguay) Ignacio Laquintana	(Uruguay) Thiago Borbas					
Santos	(Algeria) **Billal Brahimi**	(Argentina) **Adonis Frías**	(Argentina) Álvaro Barreal	(Argentina) Benjamín Rollheiser	(Argentina) Gonzalo Escobar	(Argentina) **Lautaro Díaz**	(Paraguay) **Alexis Duarte**	(Paraguay) **Gustavo Caballero**	(Venezuela) Nicola Profeta	(Venezuela) Tomás Rincón			(Argentina) Julio Furch (Argentina) Leonardo Godoy (Colombia) Alejandro Villarreal (Venezuela) Yeferson Soteldo
São Paulo	(Argentina) Alan Franco	(Argentina) **Emiliano Rigoni**	(Argentina) Enzo Díaz	(Argentina) Jonathan Calleri	(Argentina) **Juan Dinenno**	(Chile) **Gonzalo Tapia**	(Ecuador) Robert Arboleda	(Paraguay) Damián Bobadilla	(Portugal) Cédric Soares	(Venezuela) Nahuel Ferraresi			
Sport	(Argentina) Rodrigo Atencio	(Colombia) Christian Rivera	(Portugal) Gonçalo Paciência	(Portugal) João Silva	(Portugal) Sérgio Oliveira	(Uruguay) **Ignacio Ramírez**							(Argentina) Christian Ortiz (Argentina) Leonel Di Plácido (Uruguay) Fabricio Domínguez
Vasco da Gama	(Angola) Loide Augusto	(Argentina) Benjamín Garré	(Argentina) Pablo Vegetti	(Chile) Jean Meneses	(Colombia) **Andrés Gómez**	(Colombia) **Carlos Cuesta**	(Portugal) Nuno Moreira	(Uruguay) Mauricio Lemos	(Uruguay) Puma Rodríguez				(Argentina) Juan Sforza (Argentina) Manuel Capasso (France) Dimitri Payet
Vitória	(Ecuador) **Kike Saverio**	(Paraguay) Raúl Cáceres	(Portugal) **Rúben Ismael**	(Portugal) **Rúben Rodrigues**	(Spain) **Aitor Cantalapiedra**	(Uruguay) **Renzo López**							

=== Dual nationality ===
Players who are Brazilian nationals but also hold dual citizenship or represent another FIFA nation in international football are not regarded as foreign players and do not take up a foreign player slot.

- (Belgium) Wanderson (Cruzeiro)
- (Italy) **Jorginho** (Flamengo)
- (South Korea) Chico (Mirassol)
- (Italy) **Rafael Tolói** (São Paulo)
- (Italy) Lucas Piton (Vasco da Gama)

== Standings ==
=== League table ===
Pos	Team	Pld	W	D	L	GF	GA	GD	Pts	Qualification or relegation
1	Flamengo (C)	38	23	10	5	78	27	+51	79	Qualification for Copa Libertadores group stage (Note: Flamengo qualified for the Copa Libertadores group stage by winning the 2025 Copa Libertadores.)
2	Palmeiras	38	23	7	8	66	33	+33	76	Qualification for Copa Libertadores group stage
3	Cruzeiro	38	19	13	6	55	31	+24	70	Qualification for Copa Libertadores group stage
4	Mirassol	38	18	13	7	63	39	+24	67	Qualification for Copa Libertadores group stage
5	Fluminense	38	19	7	12	50	39	+11	64	Qualification for Copa Libertadores group stage
6	Botafogo	38	17	12	9	58	38	+20	63	Qualification for Copa Libertadores second stage
7	Bahia	38	17	9	12	50	47	+3	60	Qualification for Copa Libertadores second stage
8	São Paulo	38	14	9	15	43	47	−4	51	Qualification for Copa Sudamericana group stage
9	Grêmio	38	13	10	15	47	50	−3	49	Qualification for Copa Sudamericana group stage
10	Red Bull Bragantino	38	14	6	18	45	57	−12	48	Qualification for Copa Sudamericana group stage
11	Atlético Mineiro	38	12	12	14	43	44	−1	48	Qualification for Copa Sudamericana group stage
12	Santos	38	12	11	15	45	50	−5	47	Qualification for Copa Sudamericana group stage
13	Corinthians	38	12	11	15	42	47	−5	47	Qualification for Copa Libertadores group stage (Note: Corinthians qualified for the Copa Libertadores group stage by winning the 2025 Copa do Brasil.)
14	Vasco da Gama	38	13	6	19	55	60	−5	45	Qualification for Copa Sudamericana group stage
15	Vitória	38	11	12	15	35	52	−17	45	
16	Internacional	38	11	11	16	44	57	−13	44	
17	Ceará (R)	38	11	10	17	34	40	−6	43	Relegation to Campeonato Brasileiro Série B
18	Fortaleza (R)	38	11	10	17	44	58	−14	43	Relegation to Campeonato Brasileiro Série B
19	Juventude (R)	38	9	8	21	35	69	−34	35	Relegation to Campeonato Brasileiro Série B
20	Sport (R)	38	2	11	25	28	75	−47	17	Relegation to Campeonato Brasileiro Série B

Source: CBF
Rules for classification: 1) points; 2) wins; 3) goal difference; 4) goals scored; 5) head-to-head results (only between two teams); 6) fewest red cards; 7) fewest yellow cards; 8) drawing of lots.
(C) Champions; (R) Relegated

== Results ==
Home \ Away	CAM	BAH	BOT	CEA	COR	CRU	FLA	FLU	FOR	GRE	INT	JUV	MIR	PAL	RBB	SAN	SPA	SPO	VAS	VIT
Atlético Mineiro	—	3–0	1–0	1–0	0–0	1–1	1–1	3–2	3–3	1–3	2–0	0–0	1–0	0–3	2–1	1–1	0–0	3–1	5–0	2–2
Bahia	2–1	—	1–0	1–0	1–1	1–2	1–0	3–3	2–3	4–0	1–0	3–0	1–1	1–0	2–1	2–0	2–1	2–0	1–0	2–1
Botafogo	1–0	2–1	—	3–2	1–1	0–2	0–3	2–0	4–2	3–2	4–0	2–0	3–3	0–1	4–1	2–2	2–2	3–2	3–0	0–0
Ceará	0–1	1–1	0–2	—	0–1	1–1	1–1	2–0	1–1	2–0	1–2	0–1	0–2	1–3	1–0	3–0	1–1	2–0	2–1	1–0
Corinthians	1–0	1–2	2–2	0–1	—	0–0	1–2	0–2	1–1	2–0	4–2	1–1	3–0	1–1	1–2	1–0	3–1	2–1	3–0	0–0
Cruzeiro	0–0	3–0	2–2	1–2	3–0	—	2–1	0–0	1–0	4–1	2–1	4–0	2–1	2–1	2–1	1–2	1–0	1–1	1–0	3–1
Flamengo	1–0	1–0	0–0	1–0	4–0	0–0	—	1–0	5–0	1–1	1–1	6–0	2–1	3–2	3–0	3–2	2–0	3–0	1–1	8–0
Fluminense	3–0	2–0	2–0	1–0	0–1	0–2	2–1	—	2–1	1–0	1–0	1–0	1–0	1–2	2–1	1–0	6–0	2–1	2–1	1–1
Fortaleza	1–0	1–1	0–5	0–1	2–1	0–2	1–0	2–0	—	2–2	0–0	5–0	0–1	1–2	3–1	2–3	0–2	1–0	0–2	2–0
Grêmio	2–1	1–0	1–1	0–0	1–1	0–1	0–2	1–2	2–1	—	1–1	3–1	0–1	3–2	1–1	1–0	2–0	0–1	2–0	3–1
Internacional	0–0	2–2	2–0	1–0	1–1	3–0	1–3	0–2	2–1	2–3	—	3–1	1–1	0–1	3–1	1–1	1–2	2–0	1–1	1–0
Juventude	0–1	1–1	1–3	2–1	2–1	3–3	0–2	1–1	1–2	0–2	1–1	—	2–2	0–2	1–0	0–3	0–1	2–0	2–0	2–0
Mirassol	2–2	5–1	0–0	3–0	2–1	1–1	3–3	2–1	1–1	4–1	3–1	2–0	—	2–1	1–1	3–0	3–0	1–0	3–2	1–1
Palmeiras	3–2	0–1	0–0	2–1	2–0	0–0	0–2	0–0	4–1	1–0	4–1	4–1	1–1	—	5–1	2–0	1–0	3–0	3–0	0–0
Red Bull Bragantino	2–0	0–3	1–0	2–2	2–1	1–0	1–2	4–2	0–1	1–0	1–3	1–0	1–0	1–2	—	2–2	2–2	1–1	0–3	4–0
Santos	2–0	2–2	0–1	0–0	3–1	3–0	1–0	0–0	1–1	1–1	1–2	3–1	1–1	1–0	1–2	—	1–0	3–0	0–6	0–1
São Paulo	2–0	2–0	1–0	0–1	2–0	1–1	2–2	3–1	0–0	2–1	3–0	2–1	0–2	2–3	0–1	2–1	—	0–0	1–3	2–0
Sport	2–4	0–0	0–1	1–1	1–0	0–4	1–5	2–2	0–0	0–4	1–1	0–2	1–2	1–2	0–1	2–2	2–2	—	2–3	1–3
Vasco da Gama	1–1	3–1	0–2	2–2	2–3	2–0	0–0	2–0	3–0	1–1	5–1	1–3	0–2	0–1	0–2	2–1	0–2	3–1	—	4–3
Vitória	1–0	2–1	0–0	1–0	0–1	0–0	1–2	0–1	2–1	1–1	1–0	2–2	2–0	2–2	1–0	0–1	1–0	2–2	2–1	—

Source: CBF
Legend: Blue = home team win; Yellow = draw; Red = away team win.

== Season statistics ==
=== Top scorers ===
Rank	Player	Club	Goals
1	(Brazil) Kaio Jorge	Cruzeiro	21
2	(Uruguay) Giorgian de Arrascaeta	Flamengo	18
3	(Brazil) Vitor Roque	Palmeiras	16
4	(Brazil) Rayan	Vasco da Gama	14
4	(Argentina) Pablo Vegetti	Vasco da Gama	14
6	(Brazil) Reinaldo	Mirassol	13
7	(Brazil) Pedro	Flamengo	12
7	(Brazil) Carlos Vinícius	Grêmio	12
7	(Argentina) José Manuel López	Palmeiras	12
10	(Brazil) Willian José	Bahia	11
10	(Brazil) Pedro Raul	Ceará	11
10	(Brazil) Alan Patrick	Internacional	11

Source: Soccerway

=== Hat-tricks ===
Player	For	Against	Result	Date	Ref.
(Brazil) Yuri Alberto	Corinthians	Internacional	4–2 (H)	3 May 2025	
(Brazil) Kaio Jorge	Cruzeiro	Grêmio	4–1 (H)	13 July 2025	
(Brazil) Pedro	Flamengo	Vitória	8–0 (H)	25 August 2025	
(Brazil) Vitor Roque	Palmeiras	Internacional	4–1 (H)	13 September 2025	
(Brazil) Carlos Vinícius	Grêmio	Juventude	3–1 (H)	26 October 2025	
(Brazil) Deyverson	Fortaleza	Atlético Mineiro	3–3 (A)	12 November 2025	
(Brazil) Neymar	Santos	Juventude	3–0 (A)	3 December 2025	

=== Top assists ===
Rank	Player	Club	Assists
1	(Uruguay) Giorgian de Arrascaeta	Flamengo	14
2	(Brazil) Kaio Jorge	Cruzeiro	8
2	(Brazil) Paulo Henrique	Vasco da Gama	8
4	(Brazil) Matheus Pereira	Cruzeiro	7
4	(Brazil) Alan Patrick	Internacional	7
4	(Brazil) Maurício	Palmeiras	7
4	(Brazil) Jhon Jhon	Red Bull Bragantino	7
4	(Brazil) Guilherme	Santos	7
4	(Italy) Lucas Piton	Vasco da Gama	7
10	(Brazil) Ademir	Bahia	6
10	(Brazil) Willian José	Bahia	6
10	(Argentina) Lucas Mugni	Ceará	6
10	(Brazil) William	Cruzeiro	6
10	(Brazil) Pedro	Flamengo	6
10	(Argentina) Cristian Pavón	Grêmio	6
10	(Brazil) Reinaldo	Mirassol	6
10	(Brazil) Lucas Lima	Sport	6

Source: Soccerway

=== Clean sheets ===
Rank	Player	Club	Clean sheets
1	(Argentina) Agustín Rossi	Flamengo	18
2	(Brazil) Fábio	Fluminense	16
3	(Brazil) Cássio	Cruzeiro	15
4	(Brazil) Everson	Atlético Mineiro	12
4	(Brazil) Rafael	São Paulo	12
6	(Brazil) Walter	Mirassol	11
7	(Brazil) Gabriel Brazão	Santos	10
8	(Brazil) Ronaldo	Bahia	9
8	(Brazil) John	Botafogo	9
8	(Brazil) Hugo Souza	Corinthians	9
8	(Brazil) Weverton	Palmeiras	9
8	(Brazil) Cleiton	Red Bull Bragantino	9

Source: FBref.com

== Awards ==
=== Monthly awards ===
Month	Player of the month		Ref.
Month	Player	Club	Ref.
April	(Uruguay) Giorgian de Arrascaeta	Flamengo	
May	(Brazil) Kaio Jorge	Cruzeiro	
June	Not awarded		
July	(Brazil) Kaio Jorge	Cruzeiro	
August	(Uruguay) Giorgian de Arrascaeta	Flamengo	
September	(Brazil) Vitor Roque	Palmeiras	
October	(Brazil) Vitor Roque	Palmeiras	
November	(Uruguay) Giorgian de Arrascaeta	Flamengo	

Month	Goalkeeper of the month		Ref.
Month	Player	Club	Ref.
April	(Brazil) Weverton	Palmeiras	
May	(Argentina) Agustín Rossi	Flamengo	
June	Not awarded		
July	(Argentina) Agustín Rossi	Flamengo	
August	(Brazil) Walter	Mirassol	
September	(Argentina) Agustín Rossi	Flamengo	
October	(Argentina) Agustín Rossi	Flamengo	
November	(Argentina) Agustín Rossi	Flamengo	

=== Season awards ===
Série A Team of the Year
Goalkeeper	(Argentina) Agustín Rossi (Flamengo)			
Defenders	(Brazil) Paulo Henrique (Vasco da Gama)	(Brazil) Fabrício Bruno (Cruzeiro)	(Brazil) Léo Pereira (Flamengo)	(Brazil) Reinaldo (Mirassol)
Midfielders	(Brazil) Matheus Pereira (Cruzeiro)	(Italy) Jorginho (Flamengo)	(Argentina) Lucas Romero (Cruzeiro)	(Uruguay) Giorgian de Arrascaeta (Flamengo)
Forwards	(Brazil) Kaio Jorge (Cruzeiro)		(Brazil) Vitor Roque (Palmeiras)	

Player marked bold won the "Best Player of the season award".

== See also ==
- 2025 Campeonato Brasileiro Série B
- 2025 Campeonato Brasileiro Série C
- 2025 Campeonato Brasileiro Série D
