= Raul (footballer, born 1996) =

Brazilian footballer

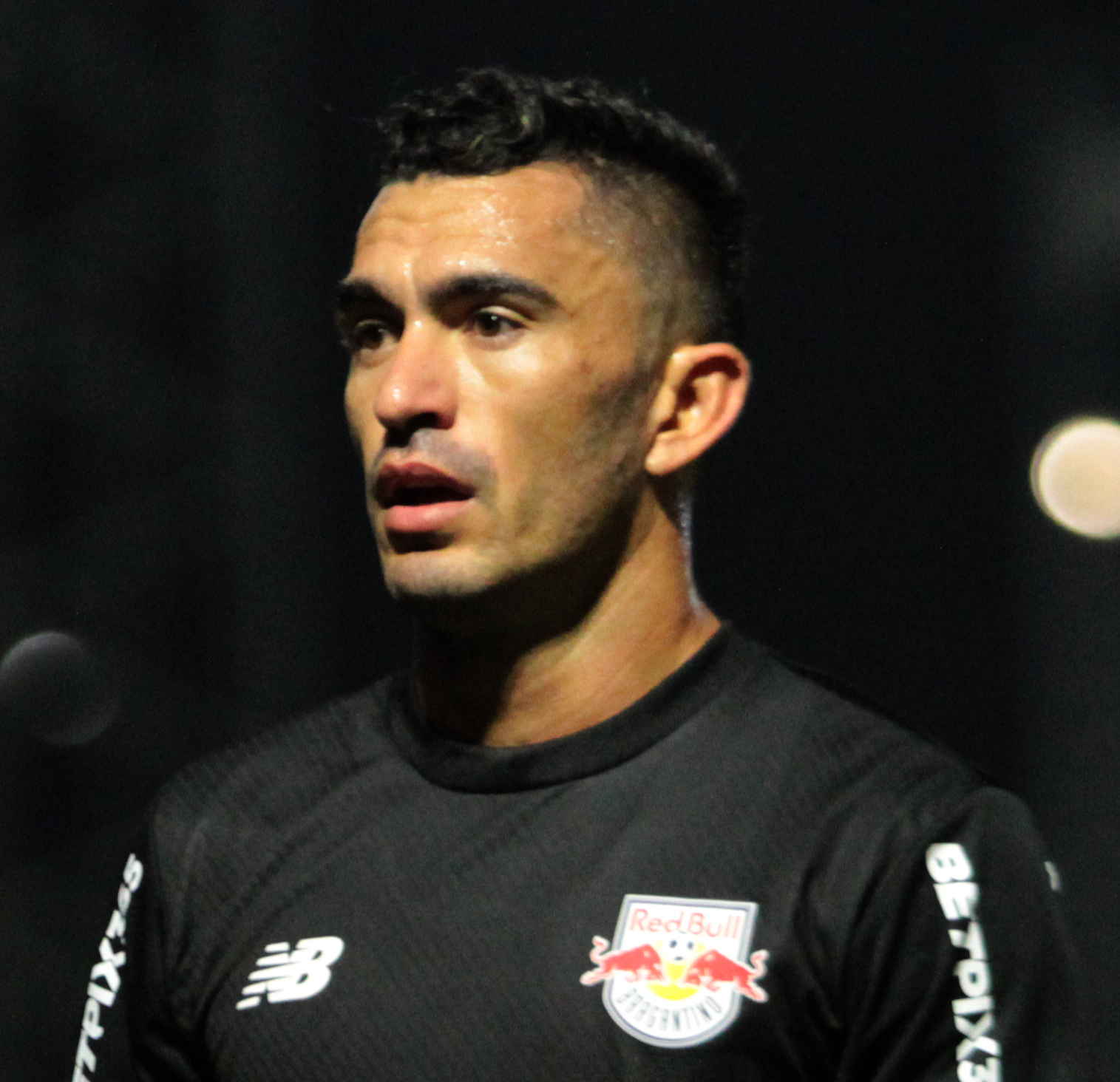
- Raul in 2022

Personal information
- Full name: Raul Lô Gonçalves
- Date of birth: 11 July 1996 (age 30)
- Place of birth: Tauá, Brazil
- Height: 1.80 m (5 ft 11 in)
- Position: Midfielder

Team information
- Current team: Cuiabá (on loan from Athletico Paranaense)
- Number: 31

Youth career
- Icasa
- 2013: Eco Suzano
- 2013–2015: Ceará

Senior career*
Years	Team	Apps	(Gls)
2016–2018	Ceará	59	(1)
2018–2020	Vasco da Gama	68	(1)
2020–2024	Red Bull Bragantino	119	(3)
2025–	Athletico Paranaense	34	(1)
2026–	→ Cuiabá (loan)	37	(0)
- * Club domestic league appearances and goals as of 18 November 2026

Raul Lô Gonçalves (born 11 July 1996), simply known as Raul, is a Brazilian footballer who plays as central midfielder for Cuiabá, on loan from Athletico Paranaense.

== Club career ==
=== Ceará ===
Raul was born in Tauá but was raised in Arneiroz, and was released from Icasa's youth setup at the age of 15. He subsequently represented Eco Suzano before joining Ceará in 2013.

Raul made his first team debut on 15 July 2015, coming on as a second-half substitute for João Marcos in a 0–0 home draw against Tupi, for the year's Copa do Brasil. In the following year, he was definitely promoted to the main squad.

Raul became a regular starter during the 2017 season, scoring the second in a 2–0 home win against Ferroviário-CE which ensured his club the Campeonato Cearense. He contributed with 31 league matches during the campaign, as his side achieved promotion to the Série A.

=== Vasco da Gama ===
On 15 May 2018, after rejecting a renewal offer from Ceará, Raul agreed to a pre-contract with Vasco da Gama. He was officially announced by his new club on 1 June, signing until 2020.

Raul made his Série A debut on 9 June 2018, replacing Giovanni Augusto in a 3–2 home defeat of Sport Recife. He scored his first goal in the category on 10 November, netting the opener in a 3–0 away win over CSA.

Raul became a starter in the 2019 season, but lost his starting spot in 2020 as his link was due to expire.

=== Red Bull Bragantino ===
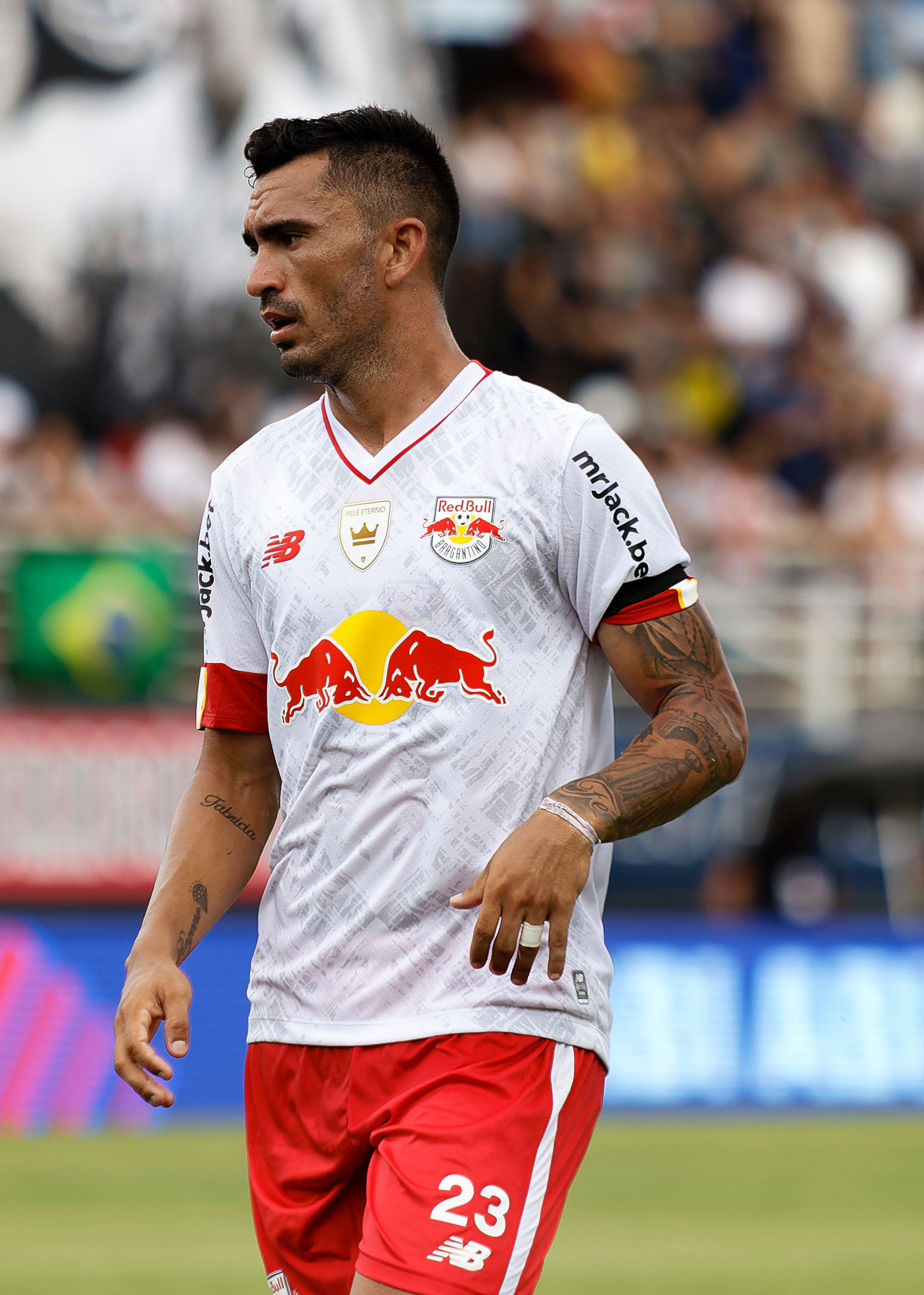
Raul playing for Red Bull Bragantino in 2023

On 11 August 2020, Raul was transferred to Red Bull Bragantino for a rumoured fee of R$ 600,000. The following 13 March, after establishing himself as a starter, he renewed his contract until 2024.

Raul suffered a knee injury in August 2021, only returning in May 2022. He suffered another injury in January 2023, returning to action in October.

== Career statistics ==
As of 5 December 2024

Appearances and goals by club, season and competition
Club	Season	League			State League		Cup		Continental		Other		Total	
Club	Season	Division	Apps	Goals	Apps	Goals	Apps	Goals	Apps	Goals	Apps	Goals	Apps	Goals
Ceará	2016	Série B	0	0	0	0	2	0	—		8 (Note: Appearance(s) in Copa Fares Lopes)	1	10	1
Ceará	2016	Série B	5	0	1	0	0	0	—		1	0	7	0
Ceará	2017	Série B	31	0	13	1	1	0	—		2 (Note: Appearance(s) in Primeira Liga)	0	47	1
Ceará	2018	Série A	0	0	9	0	0	0	—		4 (Note: Appearance(s) in Copa do Nordeste)	0	13	0
Ceará	Subtotal		36	0	23	1	3	0	—		15	1	77	2
Vasco da Gama	2018	Série A	16	0	—		—		2 (Note: Appearance(s) in Copa Sudamericana)	0	—		18	0
Vasco da Gama	2019	Série A	30	1	13	0	5	1	—		—		48	2
Vasco da Gama	2020	Série A	0	0	9	0	3	0	2	0	—		14	0
Vasco da Gama	Subtotal		46	1	22	0	8	1	4	0	—		80	2
Red Bull Bragantino	2020	Série A	30	2	—		—		—		—		30	2
Red Bull Bragantino	2021	Série A	12	0	5	0	2	0	3	0	—		22	0
Red Bull Bragantino	2022	Série A	32	0	0	0	0	0	1 (Note: Appearance(s) in Copa Libertadores)	0	—		33	0
Red Bull Bragantino	2023	Série A	3	0	4	0	0	0	0	0	—		7	0
Red Bull Bragantino	2024	Série A	26	1	7	0	1	0	5 (Note: One appearance in Copa Libertadores, four appearances in Copa Sudamericana)	0	—		39	1
Red Bull Bragantino	Subtotal		103	3	16	0	3	0	9	0	—		131	3
Career total			185	4	61	1	14	1	13	0	15	1	288	7

== Honours ==
Ceará

- Campeonato Cearense: 2017, 2018
