= Riquelme (footballer, born January 2006) =

Brazilian footballer

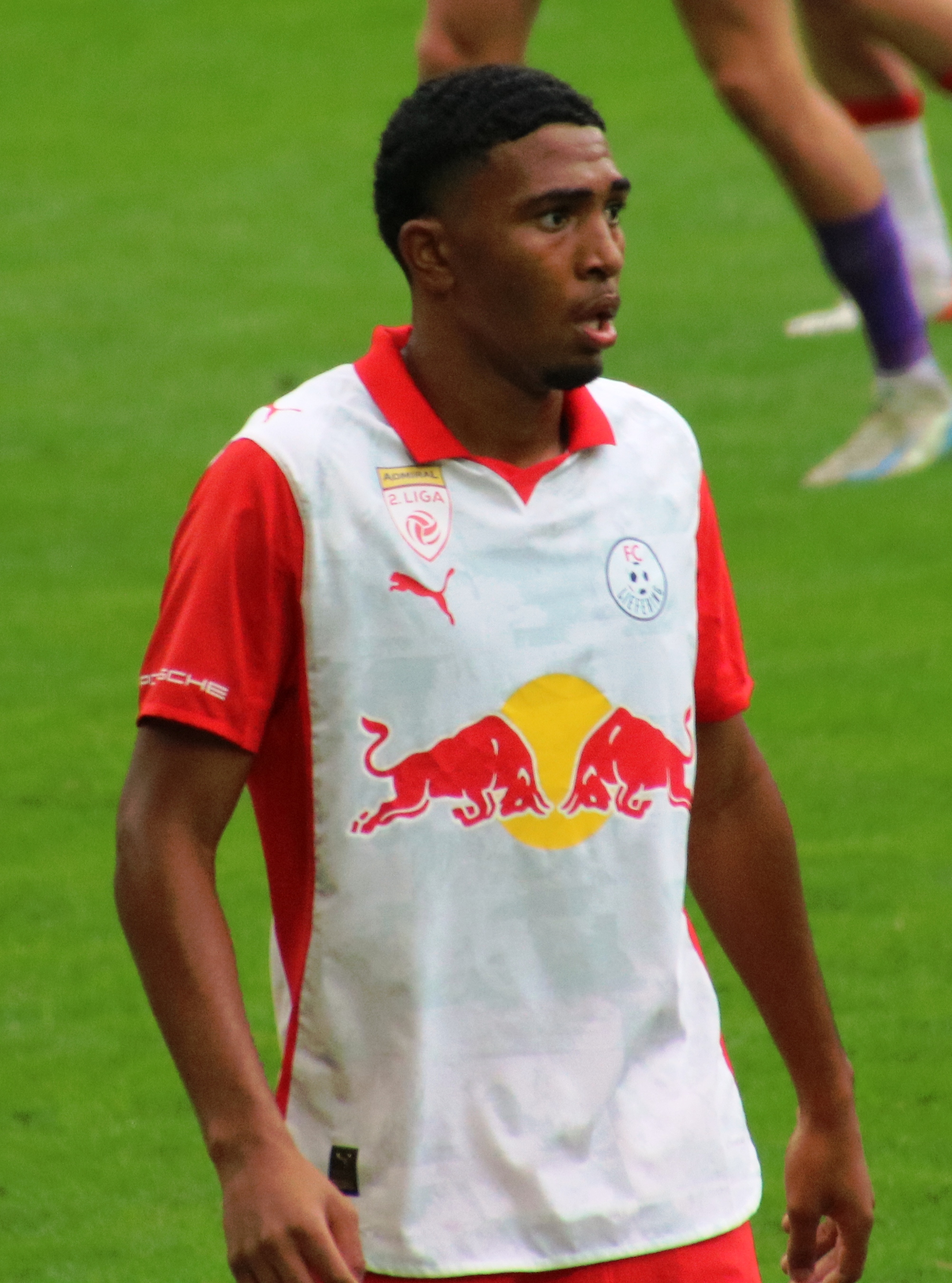

Personal information
- Full name: Riquelme Reis de Almeida de Jesus dos Santos
- Date of birth: 7 January 2006 (age 20)
- Place of birth: Salvador, Brazil
- Height: 1.88 m (6 ft 2 in)
- Position: Midfielder

Team information
- Current team: FC Liefering (on loan from Red Bull Bragantino)
- Number: 25

Youth career
- 2017–2023: Vitória
- 2021–2022: → Athletico Paranaense (loan)
- 2023–2024: Red Bull Bragantino

Senior career*
Years	Team	Apps	(Gls)
2023–2024	Red Bull Bragantino II	1	(0)
2024–	Red Bull Bragantino	1	(0)
2025–	→ FC Liefering (loan)	23	(1)
- * Club domestic league appearances and goals as of 17 May 2026

Riquelme Reis de Almeida de Jesus dos Santos (born 7 January 2006), simply known as Riquelme, is a Brazilian professional footballer who plays as a midfielder for 2. Liga club FC Liefering, on loan from Campeonato Brasileiro Série A club Red Bull Bragantino.

== Club career ==
Born in Salvador, Bahia, Riquelme joined Vitória's youth sides for the under-11 squad. He spent a short period on loan at Athletico Paranaense before being transferred to Red Bull Bragantino in March 2023, for a rumoured fee of R$ 1.5 million.

After playing with the reserves, Riquelme made his first team – and Série A – debut on 25 August 2024, coming on as a late substitute for fellow youth graduate Gustavinho in a 2–1 away loss to Flamengo.

== Career statistics ==
As of match played 14 May 2026

Appearances and goals by club, season and competition
Club	Season	League			State league		National cup		Continental		Other		Total	
Club	Season	Division	Apps	Goals	Apps	Goals	Apps	Goals	Apps	Goals	Apps	Goals	Apps	Goals
Red Bull Bragantino II	2023	Paulista A3	—		0	0	—		—		4 (Note: Appearance(s) in Copa Paulista)	0	4	0
Red Bull Bragantino II	2024	Paulista A3	—		1	0	—		—		3	0	4	0
Red Bull Bragantino II	Total		—		1	0	—		—		7	0	8	0
Red Bull Bragantino	2024	Série A	1	0	—		0	0	0	0	—		1	0
FC Liefering (loan)	2025–26	2. Liga	23	1	—		—		—		—		23	1
Career total			24	1	1	0	0	0	0	0	7	0	32	1
