= Fabrício (footballer, born June 2000) =

Brazilian footballer

Personal information
- Full name: Fabrício Oliveira de Souza
- Date of birth: 15 June 2000 (age 26)
- Place of birth: Itaquiraí, Brazil
- Height: 1.90 m (6 ft 3 in)
- Position: Goalkeeper

Team information
- Current team: Red Bull Bragantino
- Number: 37

Youth career
- 2015–2020: Desportivo Brasil
- 2018–2020: → Bahia (loan)

Senior career*
Years	Team	Apps	(Gls)
2021–2022	Desportivo Brasil	0	(0)
2021–2022	→ Red Bull Brasil (loan)	24	(0)
2022–	Red Bull Bragantino	1	(0)
- * Club domestic league appearances and goals as of 19:19, 22 August 2024 (UTC)

Fabrício Oliveira de Souza (born 15 June 2000), simply known as Fabrício, is a Brazilian footballer who plays as a goalkeeper for Red Bull Bragantino.

== Career ==
Born in Itaquiraí, Mato Grosso do Sul, Fabrício began his career in his hometown before playing for football schools in São Paulo and Paraná. He joined Desportivo Brasil's youth sides in 2015, before being loaned out to Bahia in 2018.

In 2021, Fabrício was loaned to Red Bull Bragantino, being initially assigned to reserve team Red Bull Brasil. On 14 January 2022, he signed a permanent contract with the club.

A third-choice behind Cleiton and Lucão, Fabrício made his first team debut on 13 August 2024, starting in a 2–1 home loss to Corinthians, for the year's Copa Sudamericana as both Cleiton and Lucão were injured. He made his Série A debut four days later, playing the full 90 minutes in a 2–1 loss to Fortaleza also at the Estádio Nabi Abi Chedid.

== Career statistics ==
As of 22 August 2024.

Club	Season	League			State League		Cup		Continental		Other		Total	
Club	Season	Division	Apps	Goals	Apps	Goals	Apps	Goals	Apps	Goals	Apps	Goals	Apps	Goals
Red Bull Bragantino II	2021	Paulista A2	—		12	0	—		—		—		12	0
Red Bull Bragantino II	2022	Paulista A2	—		12	0	—		—		—		12	0
Red Bull Bragantino II	2024	Paulista A3	—		—		—		—		1 (Note: Appearance(s) in Copa Paulista)	0	1	0
Red Bull Bragantino II	Total		—		24	0	—		—		1	0	25	0
Red Bull Bragantino	2022	Série A	0	0	—		0	0	0	0	—		0	0
Red Bull Bragantino	2023	Série A	0	0	0	0	0	0	0	0	—		0	0
Red Bull Bragantino	2024	Série A	1	0	0	0	0	0	2 (Note: Appearance(s) in Copa Sudamericana)	0	—		3	0
Red Bull Bragantino	Total		1	0	0	0	0	0	2	0	—		3	0
Career total			1	0	24	0	0	0	2	0	1	0	28	0
