= Jhuan Nunes =

Brazilian footballer

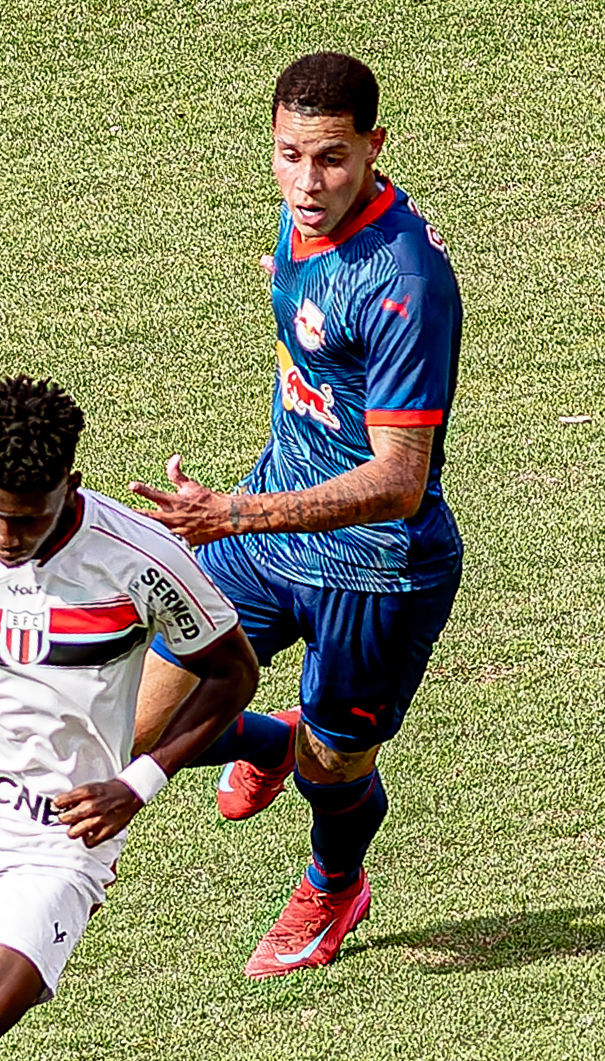
- Jhuan playing for the under-20 team of Red Bull Bragantino in 2025

Personal information
- Full name: Jhuan Nunes Coelho
- Date of birth: 3 June 2007 (age 19)
- Place of birth: Brazil
- Position: Forward

Team information
- Current team: Red Bull Bragantino
- Number: 67

Youth career
- 2022–: Red Bull Bragantino

Senior career*
Years	Team	Apps	(Gls)
2026–	Red Bull Bragantino	1	(0)

International career
2026–	Brazil U20	2	(0)
- * Club domestic league appearances and goals as of 12:54, 15 April 2026 (UTC)

Jhuan Nunes Coelho (born 3 June 2007), known as Jhuan Nunes or just Jhuan, is a Brazilian professional footballer who plays as a forward for Série A club Red Bull Bragantino.

== Club career ==
Jhuan joined Red Bull Bragantino's youth sides in 2022, and signed his first professional contract with the club in 2024. He impressed with the under-20s in the 2026 Copa São Paulo de Futebol Júnior, scoring six goals and being the top scorer of the competition.

Jhuan made his first team debut on 9 April 2026, starting in a 1–0 away loss to Carabobo, for the year's Copa Sudamericana. He made his Série A debut three days later, coming on as a late substitute for Vinicinho in a 2–1 loss at Cruzeiro.

== Career statistics ==
As of 15 April 2026

Appearances and goals by club, season and competition
Club	Season	League			State league		Copa do Brasil		Continental		Other		Total	
Club	Season	Division	Apps	Goals	Apps	Goals	Apps	Goals	Apps	Goals	Apps	Goals	Apps	Goals
Red Bull Bragantino	2026	Série A	1	0	0	0	0	0	1 (Note: Appearance(s) in Copa Sudamericana)	0	—		2	0
Career total			1	0	0	0	0	0	1	0	0	0	2	0
