= FC Liefering =

Association football club in Austria

Liefering
- Full name: Football Club Liefering GmbH
- Founded: 20 May 1947; 79 years ago as USK Anif
- Ground: Red Bull Arena, Wals-Siezenheim; Grödig Stadium, Grödig
- Capacity: 30,188; 4,638
- Owner: Red Bull GmbH
- Board member: Susanne Billinger (Chairwoman); Florian Kürbiß; Oscar Weiß
- Head coach: Danny Galm
- League: 2. Liga
- 2025–26: 2. Liga, 6th of 16
- Website: fc-liefering.at
Home colours	Away colours

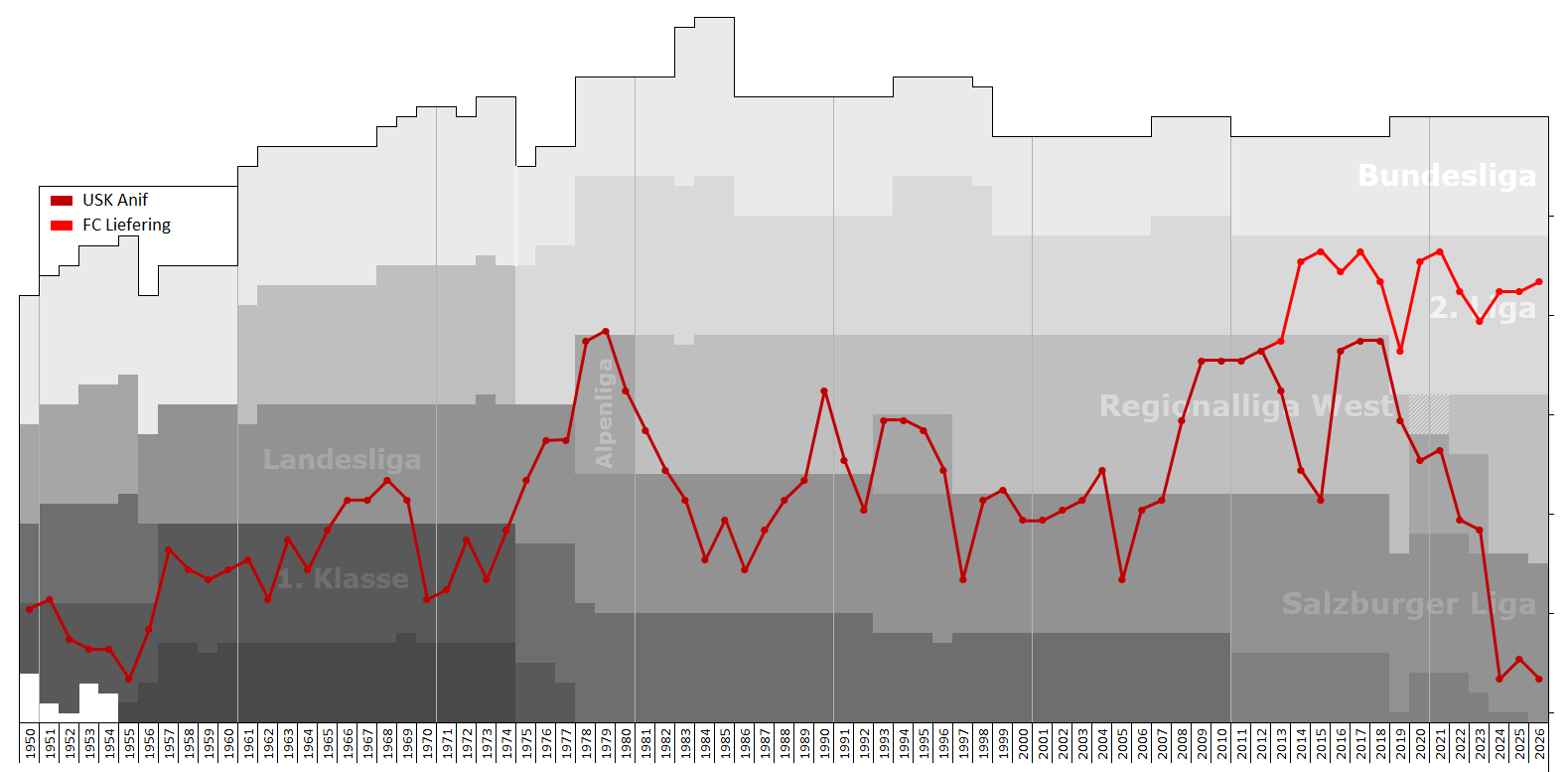
Historical chart of USK Anif and Liefering league performance

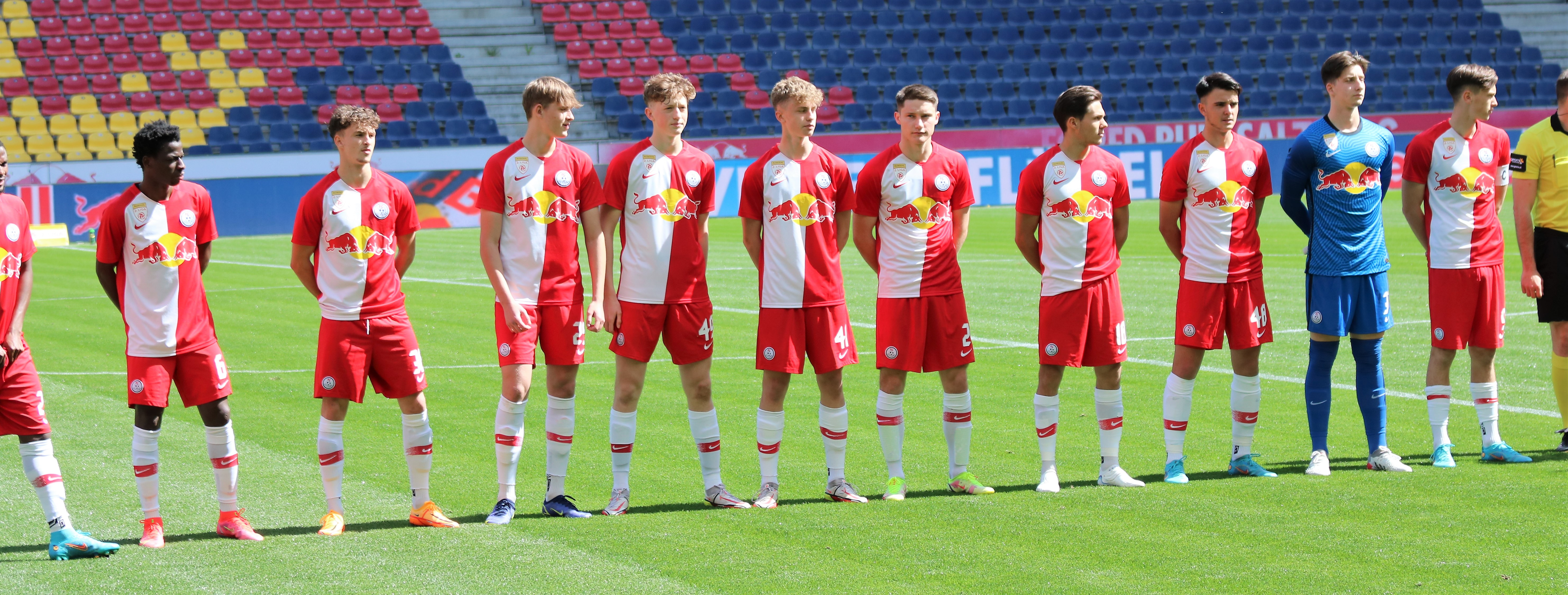
FC Liefering squad league match vs. SV Lafnitz (18 April 2022)

FC Liefering GmbH is an Austrian association football club, originally from Liefering, Salzburg. It currently plays in the Second League, the second tier of Austrian football. Since 2012, Liefering has been a reserve team for Austrian Bundesliga side Red Bull Salzburg.

In December 2011, Red Bull Salzburg signed a cooperation with FC Pasching (Regionalliga Mitte) and USK Anif (Regionalliga West). The coach of the Juniors, Gerald Baumgartner, left Salzburg and became new coach of FC Pasching. Also players went to Pasching and Anif. After the 2011–12 season, the new coach Peter Hyballa left the club and became new head coach of SK Sturm Graz. Liefering's ongoing presence in the Erste Liga continues to create unrest, with average an attendance of under 500, many people believe the club is not good for the league. However the club promotes youth and has been a key factor in Red Bull Salzburg's 2016–17 UEFA Youth League side, who ultimately won the tournament.

== Seasons ==
From the 2012–13 season the club, formerly known as USK Anif, changed its name to FC Liefering. Liefering are sometimes called Red Bull Liefering, as they adapted the jerseys and team colors from Red Bull Salzburg and RB Leipzig. In the 2012–13 season, they won the Regionalliga West and, after two relegation playoff matches, they were promoted to the Austrian Football Second League.

They are the farm team of Red Bull Salzburg. They are not eligible for promotion. In their first year, they finished third and, in the 2014–15 season, they finished second.

In June 2015, coach Peter Zeidler left the team and became coach of Red Bull Salzburg. He was succeeded by Thomas Letsch, who also followed Zeidler to Salzburg for two matches after Zeidler was fired there.

As a feeder club, the team fields very young players. In the next two seasons, the average age of the team was under twenty years old. Players like Samuel Tetteh or Gideon Mensah came to Salzburg from Ghana, other talented players came from the Red Bull Football Academy like Hannes Wolf or Luca Meisl.

In the 2016–17 season, Red Bull Salzburg (U19) won the UEFA Youth League. Most of the players came from Liefering.

In the 2020–21 season, Bo Svensson became coach of FC Liefering. In the winter, he went to Mainz 05 and Matthias Jaissle became coach of the team. At the end of the season, he was promoted to Red Bull Salzburg as head coach. He followed Jesse Marsch, who went to RB Leipzig. The season was the most successful in history. The team ended as runner-up, only one scored goal behind the champion FC Blau-Weiß Linz.

After the season ended, Kilian Schröcker, Fabian Windhager, Antonin Svoboda and Alexander Prass left the club.

In the 2021–22 season, Rene Aufhauser, former assistant coach with Red Bull Salzburg, became new head coach of FC Liefering. He also is coach of the UEFA Youth League team of Red Bull Salzburg. After finishing sixth, Aufhauser left the club.

For the 2022–23 season, Fabio Ingolitsch, the coach of the U18 team, became new head coach of FC Liefering.

In April 2024, Daniel Beichler was named caretaker manager of FC Liefering, later he promoted to manager.

Season	Final place	Goals	Points	League
2012–13	1	94:23	74	Regionalliga West
2013–14	3	72:48	57	Erste Liga
2014–15	2	70:55	56	Erste Liga
2015–16	4	65:49	57	Erste Liga
2016–17	2	58:49	60	Erste Liga
2017–18	5	58:44	55	Erste Liga
2018–19	10	50:54	35	2nd League
2019–20	3	73:47	53	2nd League
2020–21	2	69:31	63	2nd League
2021–22	6	56:43	46	2nd League
2022–23	9	52:54	37	2nd League
2023–24	6	51:40	47	2nd League
2024–25	6	43:44	43	2nd League
2025–26		:		2nd League

== Honours ==
- Second League
  - Runner up: 2014–15, 2016–17, 2020–21
- Regionalliga West
  - Champions: 2012–13
- Alpenliga
  - Champions: 1978–79*
- Austrian Landesliga
  - Champions: 1988–89*
- Salzburger Liga
  - Champions: 1988–89*, 1992–93*, 2002–03*, 2006–07*
- 1. Klasse Nord
  - Champions: 1965*, 1974*
- 2. Klasse B
  - Champions: 1950*
- Salzburg Cup
  - Winners: 1978*
- Salzburg Indoor Cup
  - Winners: 1990*, 2001*, 2002*, 2005*, 2009*

* as USK Anif

== Current squad ==
As of 13 September 2026

Note: Flags indicate national team as defined under FIFA eligibility rules; some limited exceptions apply. Players may hold more than one non-FIFA nationality.

No.	Pos.	Nation	Player
1	GK	AUT	Benjamin Ožegović
2	DF	AUT	Rafael Feldinger
6	MF	LTU	Dovas Grudzinskas
7	FW	VEN	Yerwin Sulbarán (on loan from Red Bull Salzburg)
8	MF	IRL	Josh O'Dwyer
9	FW	BIH	Said Nišić
11	FW	AUT	Oghenetejiri Adejenughure
13	DF	AUT	Jakob Pokorny
16	MF	AUT	Ilia Ivanschitz
17	FW	AUT	Raphael Kosakiewic
18	MF	COL	Mayker Palacios (on loan from Red Bull Salzburg)
20	MF	AUT	Filip Aleksić
22	MF	SLO	Miha Matjašec
23	MF	GER	Christoph Schaider

No.	Pos.	Nation	Player
24	DF	AUT	Jakob Zangerl
25	MF	BRA	Riquelme (on loan from Red Bull Bragantino)
26	MF	AUT	Benedict Scharner
27	DF	AUT	Emil Ganser
28	DF	BFA	Lassina Traoré (on loan from Red Bull Salzburg)
30	GK	AUT	Teo Hupfauf
32	GK	AUT	Alexander Hillebrand
34	GK	GER	Jonas Winklhofer
37	FW	BRA	Yuri Leles (on loan from Red Bull Bragantino)
42	MF	AUT	Jakob Werner
44	DF	SUI	Ifeanyichukwu Onwuzulike
45	DF	AUT	Nico Masching
47	DF	AUT	Julian Hussauf

=== Out on loan ===
Note: Flags indicate national team as defined under FIFA eligibility rules; some limited exceptions apply. Players may hold more than one non-FIFA nationality.

No. / Pos. / Nation / Player; — / MF / CRO / Oliver Lukić (on at TSV Hartberg until 30 June 2027)	No. / Pos. / Nation / Player; — / FW / ESP / Alexander Murillo (at Lecco until 30 June 2027)

== Coaching staff ==
Position	Staff
Head coach	(Germany) Danny Galm
Assistant coach	(Austria) Mehmet Sütcü
Assistant coach	(Austria) Andreas Ulmer
Goalkeeper coach	(Austria) Heinz Arzberger
Athletic coach	(Germany) Julian Lemke
Team doctor	(Germany) Dr. Antonius Antoniadis
Physiotherapist	(Czech Republic) Marek Cón (Austria) Stefan Huber
Team manager	(Austria) Michael Brandner
Integration officer	(Austria) Maximilian Mayer (Brazil) Ratinho
Equipment manager	(Austria) Bernhard Seywald (Austria) Aaron Geley
