= Yuri Alves =

Brazilian footballer

Personal information
- Full name: Yuri Alves de Aquino
- Date of birth: 6 September 2006 (age 20)
- Place of birth: Goiânia, Brazil
- Positions: Attacking midfielder; forward

Team information
- Current team: Red Bull Bragantino
- Number: 41

Youth career
- 2019–2025: Atlético Goianiense
- 2026–: Red Bull Bragantino

Senior career*
Years	Team	Apps	(Gls)
2025	Atlético Goianiense	22	(1)
2026–	Red Bull Bragantino	1	(0)
- * Club domestic league appearances and goals as of 12:20, 10 August 2026 (UTC)

Yuri Alves de Aquino (born 6 September 2006), known as Yuri Alves or just Yuri, is a Brazilian professional footballer who plays as either an attacking midfielder or a forward for Red Bull Bragantino.

== Career ==
=== Atlético Goianiense ===
Born in Goiânia, Goiás, Yuri began his career with hometown side Atlético Goianiense. A spotlight of the under-20 team, he made his senior debut on 16 January 2025, coming on as a second-half substitute in a 0–0 Campeonato Goiano home draw against Jataiense.

After a further three matches, Yuri returned to the under-20s before returning to first team duties in July 2025. He renewed his contract until 2029 on 25 August, and was handed his first senior start on 16 September, in a 2–1 home win over Avaí.

Yuri scored his first senior goal on 18 October 2025, netting the winner in a 1–0 home success over rivals Vila Nova.

=== Red Bull Bragantino ===
On 29 December 2025, after having offers from Botafogo and Palmeiras, Atlético agreed to transfer Yuri to Red Bull Bragantino for a rumoured fee of R$ 3 million, for 50% of his economic rights.

== Personal life ==
Yuri's grandfather Ruy Lara was also a footballer, who also played for Atlético in the 1970s.

== Career statistics ==
As of 10 August 2026

Appearances and goals by club, season and competition
Club	Season	League			State league (Note: Includes Campeonato Goiano)		Copa do Brasil		Continental		Other		Total	
Club	Season	Division	Apps	Goals	Apps	Goals	Apps	Goals	Apps	Goals	Apps	Goals	Apps	Goals
Atlético Goianense	2025	Série B	18	1	4	0	0	0	—		—		22	1
Red Bull Bragantino	2026	Série A	1	0	0	0	0	0	0	0	—		1	0
Career total			19	1	4	0	0	0	0	0	0	0	23	1
