= Juliano (footballer, born 2008) =

Brazilian footballer

Personal information
- Full name: Juliano Viana Papille
- Date of birth: 1 March 2008 (age 18)
- Place of birth: Dracena, Brazil
- Position: Forward

Team information
- Current team: Flamengo U20

Youth career
- Osvaldo Cruz
- Flórida Paulista
- Panorama
- Penápolis
- 2021–2026: Red Bull Bragantino
- 2025–2026: → Palmeiras (loan)
- 2026–: Flamengo

Senior career*
Years	Team	Apps	(Gls)
2024–2026	Red Bull Bragantino	1	(0)
- * Club domestic league appearances and goals as of 14:05, 23 August 2024 (UTC)

Juliano Viana Papille (born 1 March 2008), simply known as Juliano, is a Brazilian footballer who plays as a forward for Flamengo's under-20 team.

== Club career ==
Born in Dracena, São Paulo, Juliano began his career as a goalkeeper, but was advised to play as a forward by Tupãzinho. He joined Red Bull Bragantino's youth sides in 2021, aged 13.

On 6 July 2024, Juliano signed his first professional contract with Braga. He made his professional – and Série A – debut on 28 July, coming on as a second-half substitute for Lincoln in a 1–0 home loss to Fluminense.

On 15 August 2025, Juliano moved on loan to Palmeiras for one year. Upon returning, he signed for Flamengo as a part of the deal which saw Wallace Yan move in the opposite direction.

== Career statistics ==
As of 23 August 2024.

Club	Season	League			State League		Cup		Continental		Other		Total	
Club	Season	Division	Apps	Goals	Apps	Goals	Apps	Goals	Apps	Goals	Apps	Goals	Apps	Goals
Red Bull Bragantino	2024	Série A	1	0	—		0	0	0	0	—		1	0
Career total			1	0	0	0	0	0	0	0	0	0	1	0
