= Vinicinho =

Brazilian footballer

Personal information
- Full name: Vinicius Mendonça Pereira
- Date of birth: 20 February 2004 (age 22)
- Place of birth: Diadema, Brazil
- Height: 1.74 m (5 ft 9 in)
- Position: Forward

Team information
- Current team: Red Bull Bragantino
- Number: 17

Youth career
- Água Santa
- Desportivo Brasil
- 2021–2022: → Flamengo (loan)
- 2022–2023: → Red Bull Bragantino (loan)

Senior career*
Years	Team	Apps	(Gls)
2023–2024	Desportivo Brasil	0	(0)
2023–2024	→ Red Bull Bragantino II (loan)	16	(4)
2024–	Red Bull Bragantino	68	(6)
- * Club domestic league appearances and goals as of 7 April 2026

Vinicius Mendonça Pereira (born 20 February 2004), commonly known as Vinicinho, is a Brazilian footballer who plays as a forward for Red Bull Bragantino.

== Career ==
Born in Diadema, São Paulo, Vinicinho began his career with Água Santa, and after a period at Desportivo Brasil, moved on loan to Flamengo in April 2021, for one year. Upon returning, he featured for the under-20 side of DB before joining Red Bull Bragantino in 2023, also in a temporary deal.

In April 2024, after being regularly used with the reserve team Red Bull Bragantino II in the Campeonato Paulista Série A3, Vinicinho signed a permanent contract with the Massa Bruta until 2029. He made his first team debut with the club on 21 May, coming on as a second-half substitute for Henry Mosquera in a 3–0 home win over Sousa, for the year's Copa do Brasil.

Vinicinho made his Série A debut on 11 June 2024, replacing Helinho in a 2–1 home loss to Atlético Mineiro.

== Career statistics ==
As of 29 January 2025.

Club	Season	League			State League		Cup		Continental		Other		Total	
Club	Season	Division	Apps	Goals	Apps	Goals	Apps	Goals	Apps	Goals	Apps	Goals	Apps	Goals
Red Bull Bragantino II	2023	Paulista A3	—		—		—		—		5 (Note: Appearance(s) in Copa Paulista)	0	5	0
Red Bull Bragantino II	2024	Paulista A3	—		16	4	—		—		—		16	4
Red Bull Bragantino II	Total		—		16	4	—		—		5	0	21	4
Red Bull Bragantino	2024	Série A	16	1	—		3	0	2 (Note: Appearance(s) in Copa Sudamericana)	0	—		21	1
Red Bull Bragantino	2025	Série A	0	0	5	2	0	0	—		—		5	2
Red Bull Bragantino	Total		16	1	5	2	3	0	2	0	—		26	3
Career total			16	1	21	6	3	0	2	0	5	0	47	7
