= Lucão (footballer, born 2001) =

Brazilian footballer

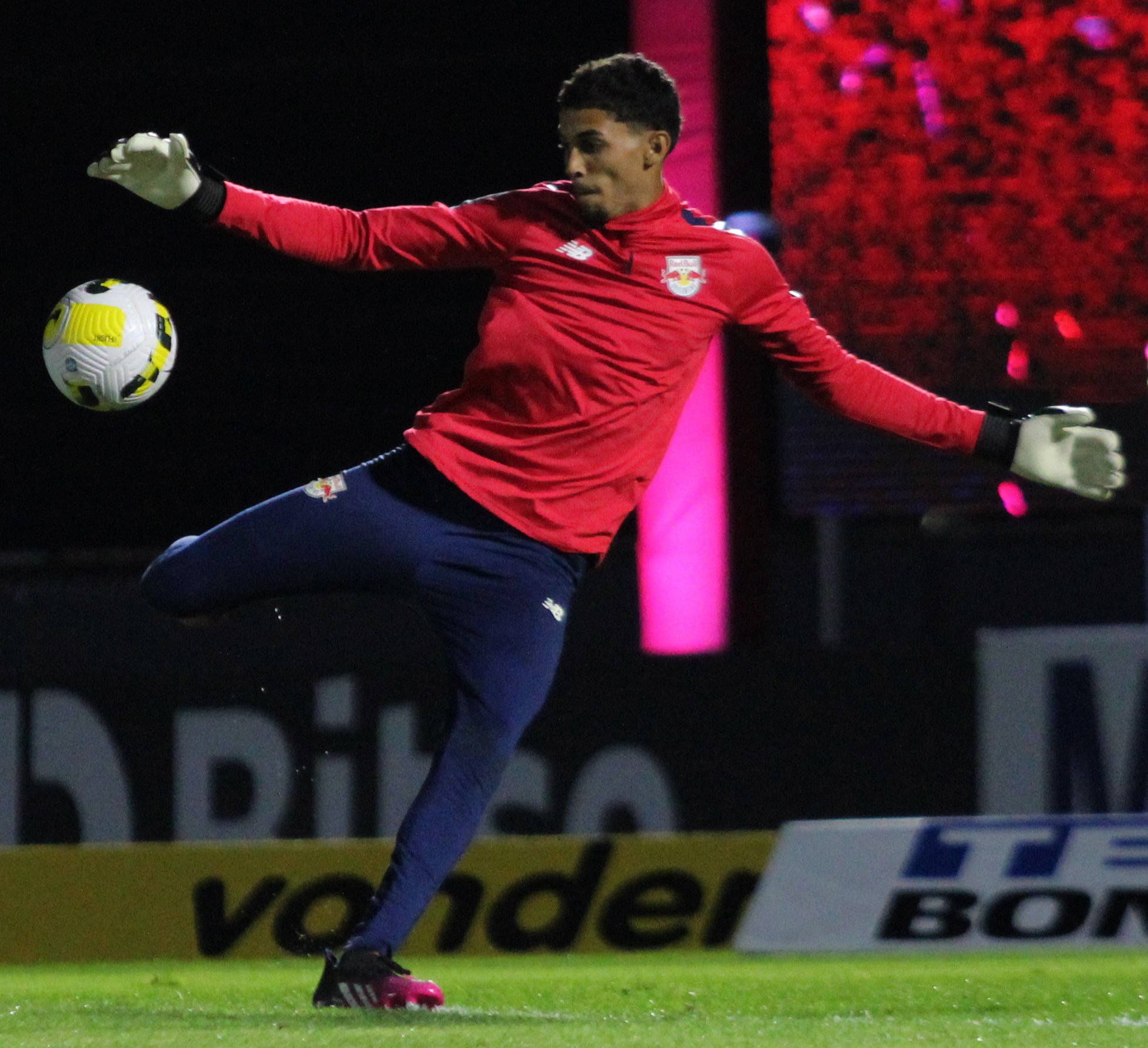
- Lucão in 2022

Personal information
- Full name: Lucas Alexandre Galdino de Azevedo
- Date of birth: 26 February 2001 (age 25)
- Place of birth: Barra Mansa, Rio de Janeiro, Brazil
- Height: 1.90 m (6 ft 3 in)
- Position: Goalkeeper

Team information
- Current team: Gil Vicente
- Number: 30

Youth career
- 2015–2020: Vasco da Gama

Senior career*
Years	Team	Apps	(Gls)
2020–2021	Vasco da Gama	25	(0)
2022–2026	Red Bull Bragantino	22	(0)
2026–	Gil Vicente	8	(0)

International career
2015–2017	Brazil U17	5	(0)
2019	Brazil U23	1	(0)
Medal record
Men's football
Representing Brazil
Olympic Games
Gold medal – first place	2020 Tokyo	Team
- * Club domestic league appearances and goals as of 25 May 2026

Lucas Alexandre Galdino de Azevedo (born 26 February 2001), commonly known as Lucão, is a Brazilian professional footballer who plays as a goalkeeper for Primeira Liga club Gil Vicente.

== Career ==
On 16 January 2026, Lucão moved to Portugal, joining Primeira Liga club Gil Vicente on a contract until 2028.

== Career statistics ==
As of match played 16 October 2025

Appearances and goals by club, season and competition
Club	Season	League			State league (Note: Includes Campeonato Carioca, Campeonato Paulista)		National cup		Continental		Other		Total	
Club	Season	Division	Apps	Goals	Apps	Goals	Apps	Goals	Apps	Goals	Apps	Goals	Apps	Goals
Vasco da Gama	2019	Série A	0	0	—		—		—		—		0	0
Vasco da Gama	2020	Série A	2	0	1	0	0	0	2 (Note: Appearances in Copa Sudamericana)	0	—		5	0
Vasco da Gama	2021	Série B	13	0	9	0	2	0	—		—		24	0
Vasco da Gama	Total		15	0	10	0	2	0	2	0	—		29	0
Red Bull Bragantino	2022	Série A	1	0	—		0	0	0	0	—		1	0
Red Bull Bragantino	2023	Série A	5	0	0	0	0	0	2	0	—		7	0
Red Bull Bragantino	2024	Série A	8	0	3	0	0	0	0	0	—		11	0
Red Bull Bragantino	2025	Série A	4	0	1	0	0	0	—		—		5	0
Red Bull Bragantino	Total		18	0	4	0	0	0	2	0	—		24	0
Career total			33	0	14	0	2	0	4	0	0	0	53	0

== Honours ==
Brazil U23

- Summer Olympics: 2020
