= Kawê =

Brazilian footballer

Personal information
- Full name: Kawê Ferreira Godoy Viana
- Date of birth: 22 June 2002 (age 24)
- Place of birth: São Paulo, Brazil
- Height: 1.78 m (5 ft 10 in)
- Position: Forward

Team information
- Current team: Red Bull Bragantino

Youth career
- 2018–2021: América Mineiro

Senior career*
Years	Team	Apps	(Gls)
2021–2022	América Mineiro	12	(0)
2022–	Red Bull Bragantino	2	(0)
2025	→ Botafogo-SP (loan)	0	(0)
- * Club domestic league appearances and goals as of 11:30, 8 January 2026 (UTC)

Kawê Ferreira Godoy Viana (born 22 June 2002) is a Brazilian professional footballer who plays as a forward for Red Bull Bragantino.

== Club career ==
Born in São Paulo, Kawê began his career with the futsal team of Corinthians. In September 2018, after playing for Audax, he joined América Mineiro's youth setup.

On 6 July 2020, after signing a professional contract, Kawê was promoted to the main squad by manager Lisca. He made his senior debut late in the month, starting in a 3–0 Campeonato Mineiro away win over URT.

Kawê made his Série A debut on 27 June 2021, coming on as a late substitute for Felipe Azevedo in a 1–1 home draw against Internacional.

On 27 July 2022, Kawê joined Red Bull Bragantino.

== Career statistics ==
As of match played 12 March 2023

Appearances and goals by club, season and competition
Club	Season	League			State league (Note: Includes Campeonato Mineiro, Campeonato Paulista)		Copa do Brasil		Continental		Other		Total	
Club	Season	Division	Apps	Goals	Apps	Goals	Apps	Goals	Apps	Goals	Apps	Goals	Apps	Goals
América Mineiro	2020	Série B	1	0	1	0	0	0	—		—		2	0
América Mineiro	2021	Série A	1	0	0	0	0	0	—		—		1	0
América Mineiro	2022	Série A	2	0	7	0	1	0	2 (Note: Appearances in Copa Libertadores)	0	—		12	0
América Mineiro	Total		4	0	8	0	1	0	2	0	—		15	0
Red Bull Bragantino	2022	Série A	0	0	0	0	0	0	—		—		0	0
Red Bull Bragantino	2023	Série A	0	0	2	0	0	0	—		—		2	0
Red Bull Bragantino	2024	Série A	0	0	0	0	0	0	0	0	—		0	0
Red Bull Bragantino	2025	Série A	0	0	0	0	0	0	—		—		0	0
Red Bull Bragantino	Total		0	0	2	0	0	0	0	0	—		2	0
Botafogo-SP (loan)	2025	Série B	0	0	—		—		—		—		0	0
Career total			4	0	10	0	1	0	2	0	0	0	17	0
