= Yuri Leles =

Brazilian footballer

- Yuri Leles with FC Liefering in 2026

Personal information
- Full name: Yuri Silva Leles de Souza
- Date of birth: 17 April 2007 (age 19)
- Place of birth: Poços de Caldas, Brazil
- Position: Winger

Team information
- Current team: FC Liefering (on loan from Red Bull Bragantino)
- Number: 37

Youth career
- 2016–2026: Red Bull Bragantino

Senior career*
Years	Team	Apps	(Gls)
2024–	Red Bull Bragantino	3	(0)
2026–	→ FC Liefering (loan)	11	(4)

International career^{‡}
2026–	Brazil U20	4	(1)
- * Club domestic league appearances and goals as of 15:15, 10 November 2026 (UTC) ‡ National team caps and goals as of 15:15, 10 November 2026 (UTC)

Yuri Silva Leles de Souza (born 17 April 2007), known as Yuri Leles or just Yuri, is a Brazilian professional footballer who plays as a winger for 2. Liga club FC Liefering, on loan from Campeonato Brasileiro Série A club Red Bull Bragantino.

== Club career ==
Born in Poços de Caldas, Yuri joined Red Bull Bragantino's youth sides in 2016, aged nine. He made his first team debut at the age of 16 on 10 March 2024, coming on as a second-half substitute for fellow youth graduate Talisson in a 1–0 Campeonato Paulista away loss to Guarani.

On 27 June 2025, Yuri renewed his contract with Bragantino until December 2029. Mainly used in the under-20 squad, he featured rarely with the main squad before being loaned out to Austrian Bundesliga club Red Bull Salzburg's feeder team FC Liefering in the 2. Liga of Austria, on 3 July 2026.

== International career ==
On 27 March 2026, Yuri was called up to the Brazil national under-20 team for two friendlies against Paraguay.

== Career statistics ==
As of 10 November 2026

Appearances and goals by club, season and competition
Club	Season	League			State league		National cup		Continental		Other		Total	
Club	Season	Division	Apps	Goals	Apps	Goals	Apps	Goals	Apps	Goals	Apps	Goals	Apps	Goals
Red Bull Bragantino	2024	Série A	0	0	1	0	0	0	0	0	—		1	0
Red Bull Bragantino	2025	Série A	0	0	—		0	0	0	0	—		0	0
Red Bull Bragantino	2026	Série A	0	0	2	0	0	0	1 (Note: Appearance(s) in Copa Sudamericana)	0	—		3	0
Red Bull Bragantino	Total		0	0	3	0	0	0	1	0	—		4	0
FC Liefering (loan)	2026–27	2. Liga	11	4	—		—		—		—		11	4
Career total			11	4	3	0	0	0	1	0	0	0	15	4
