= Guilherme (footballer, born 2002) =

Brazilian footballer

Personal information
- Full name: Guilherme Lopes de Almeida
- Date of birth: 14 February 2002 (age 24)
- Place of birth: Brasília, Brazil
- Height: 1.77 m (5 ft 10 in)
- Position: Left back

Team information
- Current team: Atlético Goianiense (on loan from Red Bull Bragantino)

Youth career
- 2016–2018: Cruzeiro
- 2019–2020: Red Bull Brasil

Senior career*
Years	Team	Apps	(Gls)
2020–2021	Red Bull Brasil	19	(0)
2021–	Red Bull Bragantino	62	(1)
2022	→ CRB (loan)	6	(0)
2026–	→ Atlético Goianiense (loan)	17	(1)
- * Club domestic league appearances and goals as of 16 April 2026

Guilherme Lopes de Almeida (born 14 February 2002), simply known as Guilherme, is a Brazilian footballer who plays as a left back for Atlético Goianiense, on loan from Red Bull Bragantino.

== Club career ==
Born in Brasília, Federal District, Guilherme played for 2 1/2 years for the youth setup of Cruzeiro before being released in 2018. He joined Red Bull Brasil in the following year, being initially assigned to the under-17s, and was kept after the merger of the club into Red Bull Bragantino.

Guilherme made his senior debut with RB Brasil during the 2020 Campeonato Paulista Série A2, attracting the interest of Real Sociedad due to his performances. On 20 October of that year, he renewed his contract with Braga until December 2024, with a R$ 25.760 million release clause.

Guilherme made his first team – and Série A – debut for Bragantino on 10 July 2021, coming on as a second-half substitute for Weverton in a 2–2 away draw against Athletico Paranaense.

== Career statistics ==
As of 22 February 2023.

Club	Season	League			State League		Cup		Continental		Other		Total	
Club	Season	Division	Apps	Goals	Apps	Goals	Apps	Goals	Apps	Goals	Apps	Goals	Apps	Goals
Red Bull Brasil	2020	Paulista A2	—		15	0	—		—		—		15	0
Red Bull Brasil	2021	Paulista A2	—		4	0	—		—		—		4	0
Red Bull Brasil	Total		—		19	0	—		—		—		19	0
Red Bull Bragantino	2021	Série A	4	0	—		0	0	1 (Note: Appearance(s) in Copa Sudamericana)	0	—		5	0
Red Bull Bragantino	2022	Série A	2	0	4	0	0	0	0	0	—		6	0
Red Bull Bragantino	2023	Série A	0	0	2	0	0	0	0	0	—		2	0
Red Bull Bragantino	Total		6	0	6	0	0	0	1	0	—		13	0
CRB (loan)	2022	Série B	8	0	—		—		—		—		8	0
Career total			14	0	25	0	0	0	1	0	0	0	40	0
