= Lucas Gonçalves =

Brazilian football manager (born 1981)

Personal information
- Full name: Lucas Gonçalves da Silva
- Date of birth: 14 October 1981 (age 45)
- Place of birth: Porto Alegre, Brazil

Team information
- Current team: Atlético Mineiro (assistant coach)

Managerial career
- Years: Team
- 2005–2007: Grêmio U11
- 2007–2008: Grêmio U13
- 2009: Grêmio U15
- 2010: Porto Alegre U17 (assistant)
- 2011: Cabofriense (assistant)
- 2011–2012: Porto Alegre U20 (assistant)
- 2012–2014: Grêmio U20
- 2015: Tombense (assistant)
- 2016: Atlético Tubarão (assistant)
- 2018: Atlético Mineiro (assistant)
- 2018: Paraná (assistant)
- 2020–: Atlético Mineiro (assistant)
- 2021: Atlético Mineiro (interim)
- 2022: Atlético Mineiro (interim)
- 2024: Atlético Mineiro (interim)
- 2025: Atlético Mineiro (interim)
- 2026: Atlético Mineiro (interim)

Lucas Gonçalves da Silva (born 14 October 1981) is a Brazilian football coach who is an assistant at Atlético Mineiro.

== Career ==
Born in Porto Alegre, Rio Grande do Sul, Gonçalves graduated in Physical Education at the Universidade Luterana do Brasil in 2004, and was appointed manager of Grêmio's under-11 squad in the following year. He left the club in 2010, after managing the under-13s and under-15s, and was named assistant manager of Porto Alegre's under-17 team.

On 13 December 2010, Gonçalves was appointed Luís Antônio Zaluar's assistant at Cabofriense. After another year back at Porto Alegre, he returned to Grêmio in 2012, now as manager of the under-20s.

In August 2016, after being an assistant at Tombense and Atlético Tubarão, Gonçalves was named analyst at Atlético Mineiro. In 2018, while Thiago Larghi was the interim manager, he was his assistant.

After a short period at Paraná, Gonçalves returned to Galo in 2019, again as analyst. He became the permanent assistant manager of the first team in the 2020 season, after James Freitas left, and was named interim manager on 26 February 2021, after the departure of Jorge Sampaoli.

== Personal life ==
Gonçalves' father Otacílio Gonçalves was also a football manager.

== Coaching statistics ==
As of 26 February 2026

Coaching record by team and tenure
Team	Nat	From	To	Record							
Team	Nat	From	To	G	W	D	L	GF	GA	GD	Win %
Atlético Mineiro (interim)	(Brazil)	25 February 2021	5 March 2021	4	4	0	0	12	2	+10	100.00
Atlético Mineiro (interim)	(Brazil)	22 July 2022	25 July 2022	1	0	0	1	1	2	−1	0.00
Atlético Mineiro (interim)	(Brazil)	4 December 2024	29 December 2024	1	1	0	0	1	0	+1	100.00
Atlético Mineiro (interim)	(Brazil)	29 August 2025	2 September 2025	1	0	0	1	0	1	−1	0.00
Atlético Mineiro (interim)	(Brazil)	12 February 2026	25 February 2026	3	1	1	1	9	5	+4	33.33
Total				10	6	1	3	23	10	+13	60.00
