= Agustín Sant'Anna =

Uruguayan footballer (born 1997)

Agustín Sant’Anna
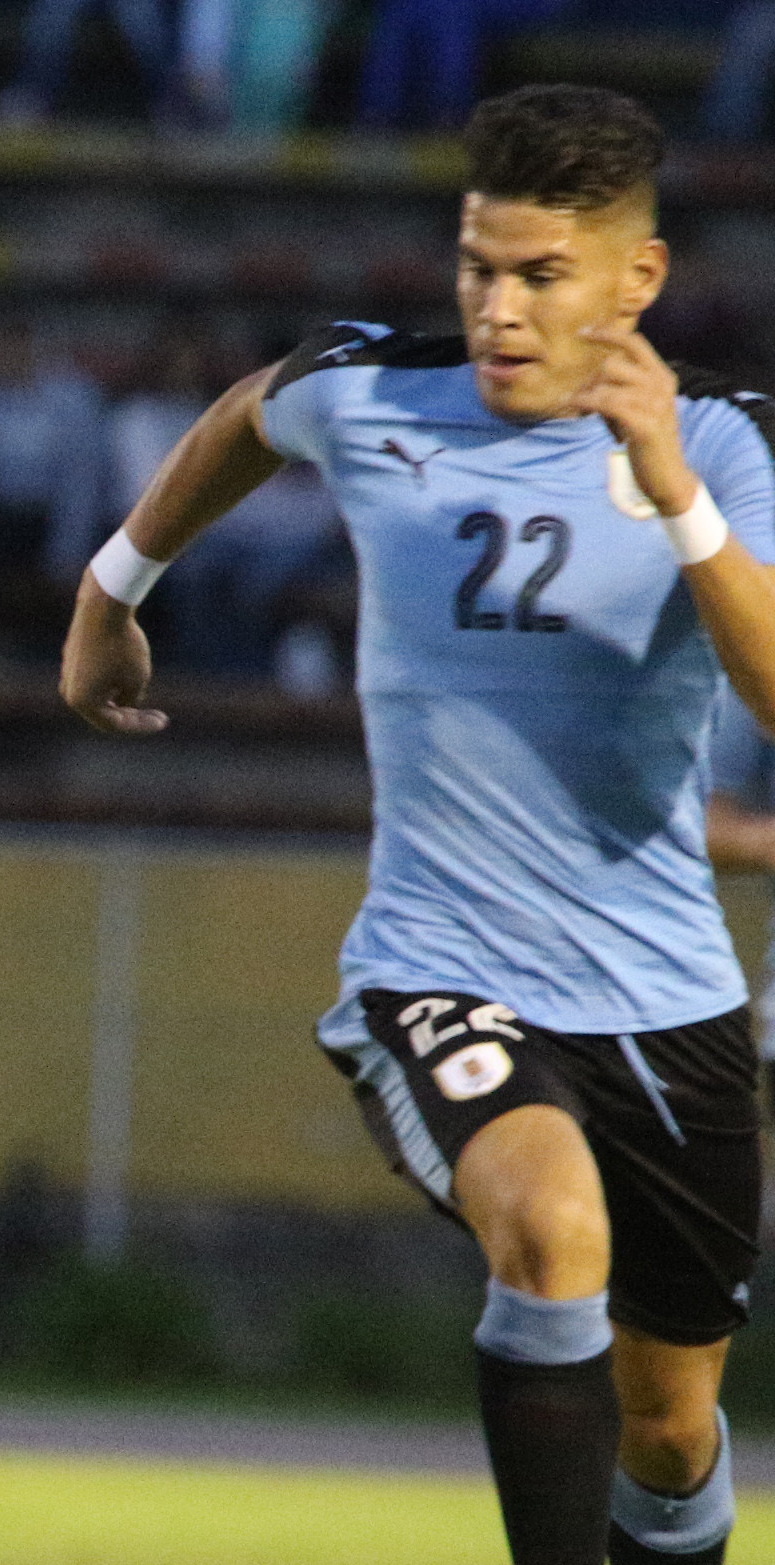
- Sant’Anna in 2017

Personal information
- Full name: Ariel Agustín Sant’Anna Quintero
- Date of birth: 27 September 1997 (age 29)
- Place of birth: Montevideo, Uruguay
- Height: 1.70 m (5 ft 7 in)
- Position: Right-back

Team information
- Current team: Red Bull Bragantino
- Number: 32

Youth career
- Nacional de Artigas
- Sauce
- Cerro

Senior career*
Years	Team	Apps	(Gls)
2015–2018	Cerro	60	(2)
2018–2019	Nacional	4	(0)
2020–2021	Deportivo Maldonado	32	(1)
2021–2022	Defensor Sporting	55	(12)
2023–2024	Defensa y Justicia	30	(0)
2024–2025	River Plate	8	(0)
2025–	Red Bull Bragantino	22	(0)

International career
2015	Uruguay U18	6	(0)
2015–2017	Uruguay U20	17	(0)
Medal record
Men's football
Representing Uruguay
South American U-20 Championship
Winner	2017 Ecuador
- * Club domestic league appearances and goals as of 7 April 2026

Ariel Agustín Sant’Anna Quintero (born 27 September 1997) is a Uruguayan professional footballer who plays as a right-back for Campeonato Brasileiro Série A club Red Bull Bragantino.

== International career ==
Sant’Anna is a former youth international. He was part of the Uruguay under-20 team which won the 2017 South American U-20 Championship.

In September 2024, Sant'Anna received his first call-up to the Uruguay national team for FIFA World Cup qualification matches against Paraguay and Venezuela.
