= Gustavo Neves =

Brazilian footballer

Personal information
- Full name: Gustavo Ribeiro Neves
- Date of birth: 23 April 2004 (age 22)
- Place of birth: Goiânia, Brazil
- Height: 1.76 m (5 ft 9 in)
- Position: Attacking midfielder

Team information
- Current team: Red Bull Bragantino
- Number: 22

Youth career
- 2016–2021: Goiás
- 2021–2022: Red Bull Bragantino

Senior career*
Years	Team	Apps	(Gls)
2023–	Red Bull Bragantino	107	(5)
- * Club domestic league appearances and goals as of 7 April 2026

Gustavo Ribeiro Neves (born 23 April 2004), known as Gustavo Neves or Gustavinho, is a Brazilian footballer who plays as an attacking midfielder for Red Bull Bragantino.

== Club career ==
Born in Goiânia, Goiás, Gustavo Neves joined Red Bull Bragantino in 2021, from Goiás. Promoted by head coach Pedro Caixinha for the 2023 season, he made his senior debut on 18 January of that year, coming on as a half-time substitute for Sorriso in a 1–1 Campeonato Paulista away draw against São Bernardo.

On 3 March 2023, Gustavo Neves renewed his contract with Braga until 2027. He scored his first professional goal two days later, netting his team's second in a 3–0 away win over São Bento.

== Career statistics ==
As of 8 April 2026.

Club	Season	League			State League		Cup		Continental		Other		Total	
Club	Season	Division	Apps	Goals	Apps	Goals	Apps	Goals	Apps	Goals	Apps	Goals	Apps	Goals
Red Bull Bragantino	2023	Série A	19	1	12	1	2	0	6 (Note: Appearance(s) in Copa Sudamericana)	2	—		39	4
Red Bull Bragantino	2024	Série A	27	1	10	1	2	1	9 (Note: Two appearances in Copa Libertadores, seven appearances and one goal in Copa Sudamericana)	1	—		48	4
Red Bull Bragantino	2025	Série A	17	0	7	0	2	0	—		—		26	0
Red Bull Bragantino	2026	Série A	8	1	7	0	0	0	0	0	—		15	1
Career total			71	3	36	2	6	1	15	3	0	0	128	9
