= Sergio Palacios =

Colombian footballer (born 2005)

Personal information
- Full name: Sergio Stevan Palacios Zapata
- Date of birth: 14 February 2005 (age 21)
- Place of birth: Cali, Colombia
- Height: 1.95 m (6 ft 5 in)
- Position: Centre-back

Team information
- Current team: Ponte Preta (on loan from Red Bull Bragantino)

Youth career
- Buscando Talentos
- Deportivo Cali
- 2020–2023: Once Caldas

Senior career*
Years	Team	Apps	(Gls)
2023–2024	Once Caldas	33	(0)
2024–	Red Bull Bragantino	3	(0)
2026–	→ Ponte Preta (loan)	22	(0)

International career
2024–	Colombia U20	1	(0)
- * Club domestic league appearances and goals as of 18 November 2026

Sergio Stevan Palacios Zapata (born 14 February 2005) is a Colombian professional footballer who plays as a centre-back for Brazilian club Ponte Preta on loan from Red Bull Bragantino.

== Career ==
=== Once Caldas ===
Born in Cali, Palacios joined Once Caldas' youth sides at the age of 15, after representing Deportivo Cali and a local academy named Buscando Talentos. He made his first team – and Categoría Primera A – debut on 4 September 2023, coming on as a late substitute in a 2–1 home loss to Atlético Huila.

Palacios established himself as a starter for the club during the 2024 season.

=== Red Bull Bragantino ===
On 2 September 2024, Palacios was announced at Campeonato Brasileiro Série A side Red Bull Bragantino on a five-year contract, for a rumoured fee of US$ 3,5 million.

== International career ==
On 17 June 2024, Palacios was called up to the Colombia national under-20 team.

== Personal life ==
Palacios' older brother Jair was also a footballer. A right-back, he mainly played for Millonarios.

== Career statistics ==
As of match played 26 July 2025

Appearances and goals by club, season and competition
Club	Season	League			National cup (Note: Includes Copa Colombia)		Continental		Other		Total	
Club	Season	Division	Apps	Goals	Apps	Goals	Apps	Goals	Apps	Goals	Apps	Goals
Once Caldas	2023	Categoría Primera A	6	0	0	0	—		—		6	0
Once Caldas	2024	Categoría Primera A	27	0	2	0	—		—		29	0
Once Caldas	Total		33	0	2	0	—		—		35	0
Red Bull Bragantino	2024	Série A	1	0	0	0	—		—		1	0
Red Bull Bragantino	2025	Série A	2	0	0	0	—		—		2	0
Red Bull Bragantino	Total		3	0	2	0	—		—		3	0
Career total			36	0	2	0	0	0	0	0	38	0
