= José Hurtado (footballer) =

Ecuadorian footballer (born 2001)

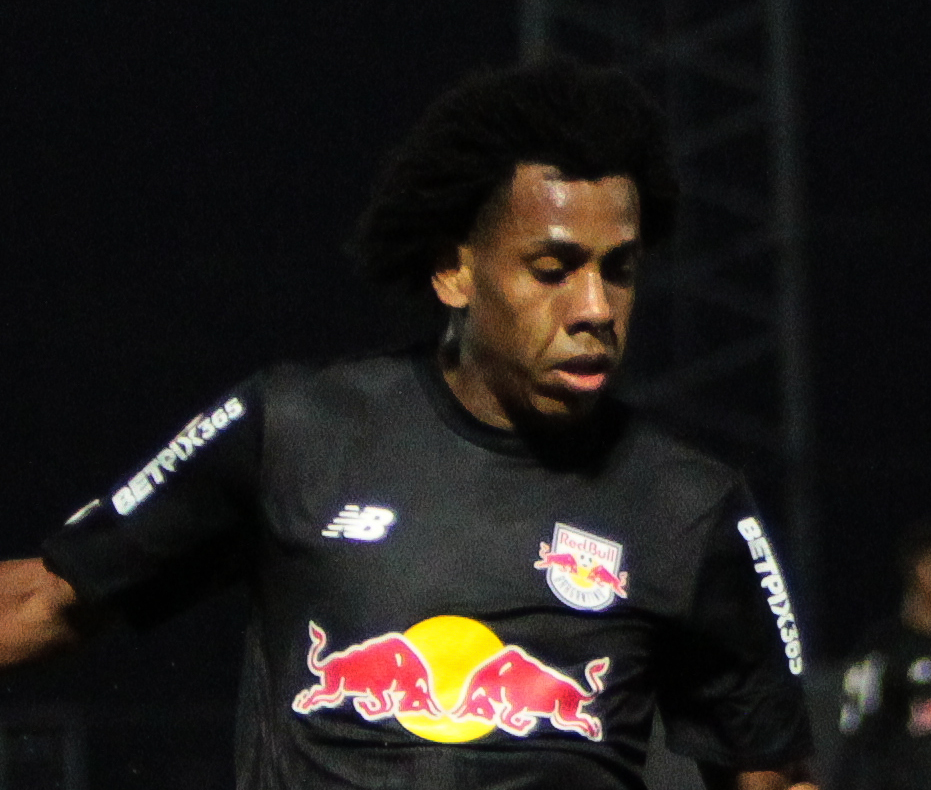

Personal information
- Full name: José Andrés Hurtado Cheme
- Date of birth: 23 December 2001 (age 24)
- Place of birth: Santo Domingo, Ecuador
- Height: 1.78 m (5 ft 10 in)
- Position: Right-back

Team information
- Current team: Red Bull Bragantino
- Number: 34

Youth career
- Independiente del Valle

Senior career*
Years	Team	Apps	(Gls)
2019–2021	Independiente del Valle	28	(1)
2022–	Red Bull Bragantino	150	(1)

International career^{‡}
2021–	Ecuador	11	(0)
- * Club domestic league appearances and goals as of 12 September 2026 ‡ National team caps and goals as of 17:30, 5 October 2026 (UTC)

José Andrés Hurtado Cheme (born 23 December 2001) is an Ecuadorian professional footballer who plays as a right-back for the Brazilian Série A club Red Bull Bragantino and the Ecuador national team.

== Club career ==
Hurtado made his senior debut with Independiente del Valle in a 0–0 Ecuadorian Serie A tie with Delfín on 2 November 2019. He formally joined the Independiente del Valle senior team on 10 February 2021.

== International career ==
Hurtado was called up to represent the Ecuador national football team at the 2021 Copa America.

He made his debut on 5 September 2021 in a World Cup qualifier against Chile, a 0–0 home draw. He started the game and was substituted after 57 minutes.

== Career statistics ==
=== Club ===
As of 12 September 2026.

Appearances and goals by club, season and competition
Club	Season	League			National cup (Note: Includes Copa do Brasil)		Continental		Other		Total	
Club	Season	Division	Apps	Goals	Apps	Goals	Apps	Goals	Apps	Goals	Apps	Goals
Independiente del Valle	2019	LigaPro Serie A	1	0	—		—		—		1	0
Independiente del Valle	2020	LigaPro Serie A	1	0	—		0	0	—		1	0
Independiente del Valle	2021	LigaPro Serie A	26	1	—		8 (Note: Seven appearances in Copa Libertadores, one appearance in Copa Sudamericana)	0	—		34	0
Independiente del Valle	Total		28	1	0	0	8	0	0	0	36	1
Red Bull Bragantino	2022	Série A	16	0	2	0	6 (Note: Appearances in Copa Libertadores.)	2	10 (Note: Appearances in the Campeonato Paulista.)	0	34	2
Red Bull Bragantino	2023	Série A	12	0	2	0	3 (Note: Appearances in Copa Sudamericana.)	0	25	0	42	0
Red Bull Bragantino	2024	Série A	17	0	0	0	2	0	8	0	27	0
Red Bull Bragantino	2025	Série A	28	1	4	0	0	0	10	0	42	1
Red Bull Bragantino	2026	Série A	17	1	2	0	4	0	7	0	30	1
Red Bull Bragantino	Total		90	2	10	0	15	2	60	0	173	4
Career total			118	3	10	0	23	2	60	0	211	5

=== International ===
As of match played 5 October 2026

Appearances and goals by national team and year
National team	Year	Apps	Goals
Ecuador	2021	1	0
Ecuador	2023	5	0
Ecuador	2024	3	0
Ecuador	2026	2	0
Total		11	0
