= Henry Mosquera =

Colombian footballer (born 2001)

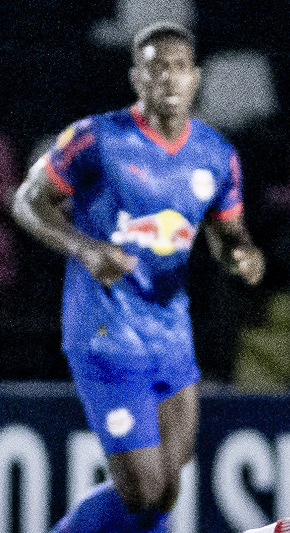
- Mosquera playing with Red Bull Bragantino in 2025

Personal information
- Full name: Henry David Mosquera Sánchez
- Date of birth: 15 November 2001 (age 24)
- Place of birth: Quibdó, Colombia
- Height: 1.75 m (5 ft 9 in)
- Position: Winger

Team information
- Current team: Red Bull Bragantino
- Number: 16

Youth career
- Los Papeticos
- 2021: La Mazzia

Senior career*
Years	Team	Apps	(Gls)
2022–2023	Envigado	49	(5)
2023–	Red Bull Bragantino	106	(5)

International career^{‡}
2023–	Colombia	1	(0)
- * Club domestic league appearances and goals as of 7 April 2026 ‡ National team caps and goals as of 16 December 2023

Henry David Mosquera Sánchez (born 15 November 2001) is a Colombian footballer who plays as a left winger for Brazilian club Red Bull Bragantino.

== Career ==
=== Early career ===
Born in Quibdó, Mosquera began his career with amateur side Club Los Papeticos in his hometown. He moved to Medellín at the age of 19, and played for CD La Mazzia before impressing the observers of Envigado.

=== Envigado ===
On 27 December 2021, Mosquera was announced at Envigado. He made his professional – and Categoría Primera A – debut on 20 January 2022, starting in a 1–0 away loss against América de Cali.

Mosquera scored his first professional goal on 17 September 2022, netting Envigado's third in a 3–2 home win over Cortuluá. He was an ever-present figure for the side during the season, scoring twice in 42 appearances overall.

=== Red Bull Bragantino ===
On 30 March 2023, Envigado announced the transfer of Mosquera to Brazilian Série A side Red Bull Bragantino. Bragantino confirmed the transfer the following day, and he signed a five-year contract.

== Career statistics ==
=== Club ===
As of 5 July 2023.

Club	Season	League			Cup		Continental		Other		Total	
Club	Season	Division	Apps	Goals	Apps	Goals	Apps	Goals	Apps	Goals	Apps	Goals
Envigado	2022	Categoría Primera A	40	2	2	0	—		—		42	2
Envigado	2023	Categoría Primera A	9	3	1	0	—		—		10	3
Envigado	Total		49	5	3	0	—		—		52	5
Red Bull Bragantino	2023	Série A	10	2	0	0	4 (Note: Appearance(s) in Copa Sudamericana)	0	—		14	2
Career total			59	7	3	0	4	0	0	0	66	7

=== International ===
As of match played 16 December 2023

Appearances and goals by national team and year
National team	Year	Apps	Goals
Colombia	2023	1	0
Total		1	0
