= Cleiton (footballer, born 1997) =

Brazilian footballer

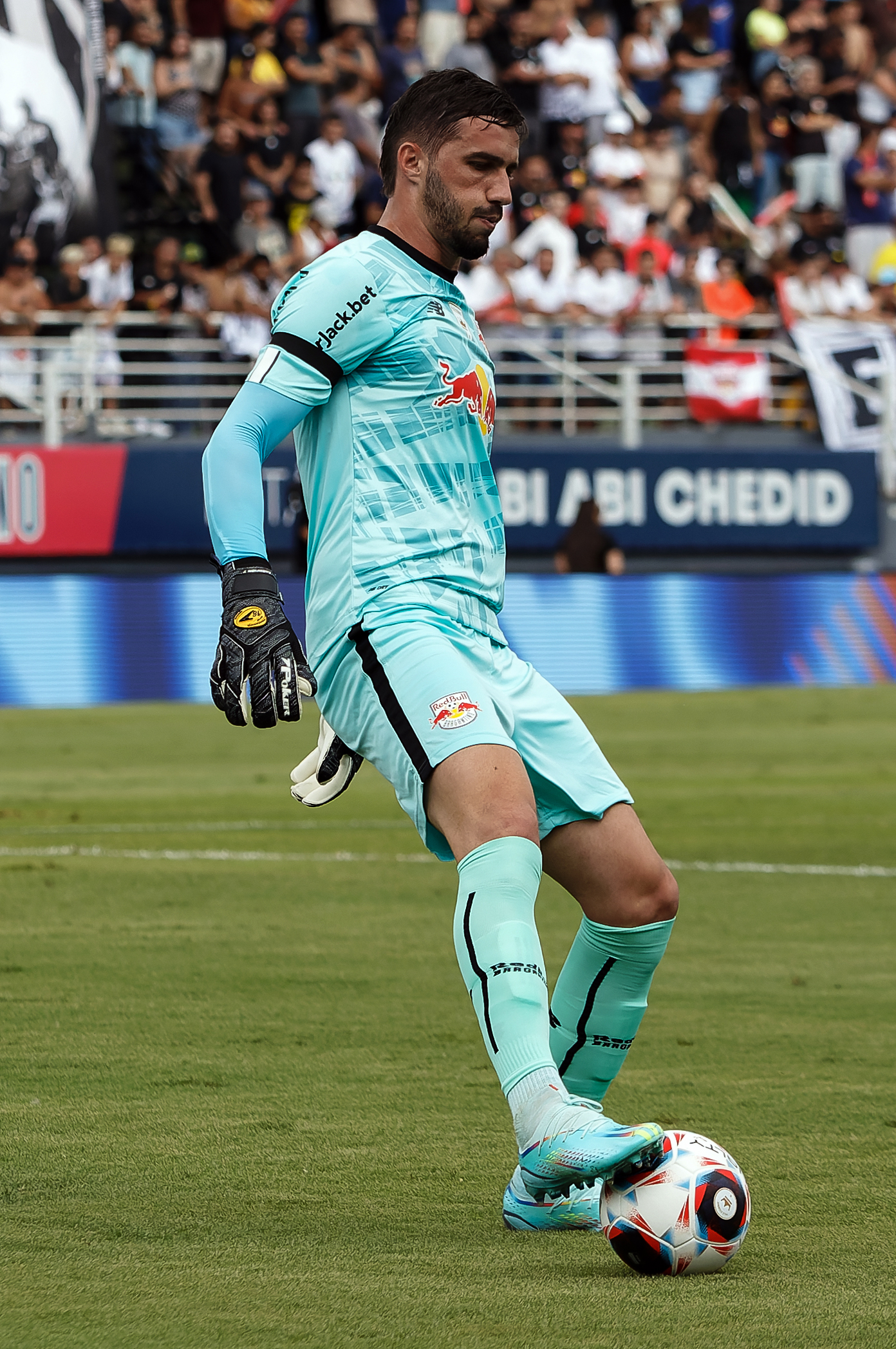
- Cleiton with Red Bull Bragantino in 2023

Personal information
- Full name: Cleiton Schwengber
- Date of birth: 19 August 1997 (age 29)
- Place of birth: Descanso, Brazil
- Height: 1.90 m (6 ft 3 in)
- Position: Goalkeeper

Team information
- Current team: Red Bull Bragantino
- Number: 1

Youth career
- Marcílio Dias
- 2013–2017: Atlético Mineiro

Senior career*
Years	Team	Apps	(Gls)
2016–2019	Atlético Mineiro	33	(0)
2020–	Red Bull Bragantino	269	(0)

International career^{‡}
2016–2017	Brazil U20	3	(0)
2019–2021	Brazil U23	5	(0)
- * Club domestic league appearances and goals as of 7 April 2026 ‡ National team caps and goals as of 2 July 2021

Cleiton Schwengber (born 19 August 1997), simply known as Cleiton, is a Brazilian footballer who plays as a goalkeeper for Red Bull Bragantino.

== International career ==
Cleiton represented Brazil at the 2017 South American U-20 Championship and the 2020 CONMEBOL Pre-Olympic Tournament, being runner-up in the latter and securing a spot at the 2020 Olympics.

== Career statistics ==
=== Club ===
As of match played 7 December 2025.

Appearances and goals by club, season and competition
Club	Season	League			State League		Cup		Continental		Other		Total	
Club	Season	Division	Apps	Goals	Apps	Goals	Apps	Goals	Apps	Goals	Apps	Goals	Apps	Goals
Atlético Mineiro	2016	Série A	0	0	—		0	0	—		0	0	0	0
Atlético Mineiro	2017	Série A	1	0	0	0	0	0	—		0	0	1	0
Atlético Mineiro	2018	Série A	0	0	1 (Note: Appearances in Campeonato Mineiro)	0	0	0	0	0	—		1	0
Atlético Mineiro	2019	Série A	25	0	6	0	0	0	8 (Note: One appearance in Copa Libertadores, seven appearances in Copa Sudamericana)	0	—		39	0
Atlético Mineiro	Total		26	0	7	0	0	0	8	0	0	0	41	0
Red Bull Bragantino	2020	Série A	32	0	2 (Note: Appearances in Campeonato Paulista)	0	2	0	—		—		36	0
Red Bull Bragantino	2021	Série A	34	0	9	0	—		13 (Note: Appearance(s) in Copa Sudamericana)	0	—		56	0
Red Bull Bragantino	2022	Série A	37	0	12	0	2	0	6	0	—		57	0
Red Bull Bragantino	2023	Série A	33	0	12	0	2	0	6	0	—		53	0
Red Bull Bragantino	2024	Série A	31	0	11	0	4	0	12	0	—		58	0
Red Bull Bragantino	2025	Série A	34	0	12	0	6	0	—		—		52	0
Red Bull Bragantino	Total		201	0	58	0	16	0	37	0	—		312	0
Career total			227	0	65	0	16	0	45	0	0	0	353	0
