= Red Bull Bragantino =

Association football team in Brazil

RB Bragantino
- Full name: Red Bull Bragantino
- Nicknames: Massa Bruta (Brute Mass); Braga; Braga Boys
- Founded: 1 January 2020; 6 years ago
- Ground: Cícero de Souza Marques
- Capacity: 12,000
- Owner: Red Bull GmbH
- CEO: Diego Cerri
- Head coach: Vagner Mancini
- League: Campeonato Brasileiro Série A Campeonato Paulista
- 2025 2025: Série A, 10th of 20; Paulista, 7th of 16
- Website: www.redbullbragantino.com.br
Home colours	Away colours	Third colours

Red Bull Bragantino (Brazilian Portuguese: [ˈʁɛdʒi ˈbuw bɾaɡɐ̃ˈtʃinu]) is a Brazilian football club based in Bragança Paulista, São Paulo. It competes in the Série A, the top tier of the Brazilian football league system, as well as in the Campeonato Paulista Série A1, the highest level of the São Paulo state football league.

The club was known as Clube Atlético Bragantino, before club administration was taken over by Red Bull GmbH in 2019, but in that second division season the team was simply called Bragantino with Red Bull appearing only as a sponsor on the shirts. They were promoted to the Série A and qualified for the 2020 Copa do Brasil round of 16.

For the next season Red Bull renamed the club to RB Bragantino and changed the crest and its colours from its traditional black and white to red and white, de facto becoming a new club, whilst the company's existing club founded in 2007, Red Bull Brasil, became its reserve team.

== History ==
=== Predecessor club ===
On 8 January 1928, former Bragança Futebol Clube members founded Clube Atlético Bragantino.

In 1949 the club played in the Campeonato Paulista Second Division for the first time. In 1965, Bragantino was promoted to the Campeonato Paulista First Division for the first time. In 1966, however, the club was relegated to the Campeonato Paulista Second Division.

In 1988, Bragantino was the Campeonato Paulista Second Division champion. In 1989, the club was promoted to the Campeonato Brasileiro Série A for the first time after winning the Campeonato Brasileiro Série B. In 1990 Bragantino defeated the Novorizontino to win the Campeonato Paulista First Division. The final was nicknamed the caipira final (final caipira, in Portuguese language).

In 1991, the club was the Campeonato Brasileiro Série A runner-up. In the final, Bragantino was defeated by São Paulo. In 1992 the club competed in the Copa CONMEBOL, debuting in international competitions. In 1993 Bragantino competed in the Copa CONMEBOL for the second time. In 1995 the club was relegated to the Campeonato Paulista Second Division. In 1996 Bragantino competed in the Copa CONMEBOL for the third time.

In 1998, the club was relegated to the Campeonato Brasileiro Série B. In 2002, after a poor campaign, Bragantino were relegated to the Campeonato Brasileiro Série C. In 2005 the club was promoted to the Campeonato Paulista First Division. In 2007 Bragantino won the Campeonato Brasileiro Série C thus being promoted to the following year's Campeonato Brasileiro Série B.

=== Red Bull agreement ===
On 26 March 2019, Bragantino's president announced a partnership deal with Red Bull Brasil. Red Bull GmbH sought negotiations due to the team's failure to reach the Série A, preferring to partner with a different existing club. In April 2019, Bragantino signed a deal with Red Bull GmbH handling over management of all their football-related assets.

For the 2019 second division season the team was simply called Bragantino with Red Bull appearing only as a sponsor on the shirts. They were promoted to the Série A and qualified for the 2020 Copa do Brasil round of 16.

=== New club ===
From 2020 the name of Red Bull Bragantino was introduced. They changed the crest and its colours from its traditional black and white to red and white, de facto becoming a new club.

On 16 January 2023, Red Bull Brasil changed its name to Red Bull Bragantino II, becoming the B team of Red Bull Bragantino.

== Stadium ==
Red Bull Bragantino's stadium is the Estádio Nabi Abi Chedid, built in 1949 with a maximum capacity of 21,210 people. The stadium, owned by the Clube Atlético Bragantino, honors Nabi Abi Chedid, a former president of the club and father of present president Marco Antônio Abi Chedid. It had previously been named the Estádio Marcelo Stéfani, in honor of Marcelo Stéfani, a player and former president of the club. As Estádio Marcelo Stéfani, the stadium was also known by the nickname Marcelão. The name change was effected on 6 January 2009 amid criticism from the Bragança Paulista population.

== Season records ==
As of 13 November 2022.

Season	Div.	Pos.	Pl.	W	D	L	GS	GA	Pts.	Copa do Brasil	CONMEBOL	
2020	Série A	10	38	13	14	11	50	40	53	First round	DNP	
2021	Série A	6	38	14	14	10	55	46	56	Third round	CS	Runners-up
2022	Série A	14	38	11	11	16	49	59	44	Third round	CL	Group stage
2023	Série A	6	38	17	11	10	49	35	62	Second round	DNP	
2024	Série A	16	38	10	14	14	44	48	44	Round of 16	CS	Round of 16
2025	Série A	10	38	14	6	18	45	57	48	Round of 16	DNP	

== Current squad ==
As of 22 September 2026

Note: Flags indicate national team as defined under FIFA eligibility rules; some limited exceptions apply. Players may hold more than one non-FIFA nationality.

No.	Pos.	Nation	Player
1	GK	BRA	Cleiton (captain)
2	DF	URU	Guzmán Rodríguez
3	DF	BRA	Eduardo Santos
4	DF	BRA	Alix Vinicius
5	MF	BRA	Fabinho
6	MF	BRA	Gabriel
7	MF	BRA	Eric Ramires
8	FW	BRA	Eduardo Sasha
9	FW	PAR	Isidro Pitta
11	FW	BRA	Fernando
12	DF	BRA	Vanderlan
15	MF	URU	Nacho Sosa
16	DF	BRA	Gustavo Marques
17	FW	BRA	Vinicinho
18	GK	BRA	Tiago Volpi
19	FW	BRA	Bruno Gonçalves

No.	Pos.	Nation	Player
20	MF	BRA	Rodriguinho
21	FW	BRA	Lucas Barbosa
22	MF	BRA	Gustavo Neves
23	DF	URU	Agustín Sant'Anna
27	FW	BRA	Davi Gomes
28	MF	BRA	Patrick (on loan from Atlético Mineiro)
29	DF	BRA	Juninho Capixaba
30	FW	COL	Henry Mosquera
32	FW	ARG	José María Herrera
34	DF	ECU	Andrés Hurtado
35	MF	BRA	Matheus Fernandes
37	GK	BRA	Fabrício
47	FW	BRA	Wallace Yan
51	DF	BRA	Cauê Nascimento
56	GK	BRA	Gustavo Reis
57	FW	BRA	Marcelinho Braz

=== Youth team ===
Note: Flags indicate national team as defined under FIFA eligibility rules; some limited exceptions apply. Players may hold more than one non-FIFA nationality.

No.	Pos.	Nation	Player
41	MF	BRA	Yuri Alves
46	DF	BRA	Breno Moraes
52	DF	BRA	Ryan Augusto
54	DF	COL	Weimar Palacios

No.	Pos.	Nation	Player
58	MF	BRA	Gabriel Lopes
62	MF	BRA	Marquinhos
67	FW	BRA	Jhuan Nunes

=== Out on loan ===
Note: Flags indicate national team as defined under FIFA eligibility rules; some limited exceptions apply. Players may hold more than one non-FIFA nationality.

No.	Pos.	Nation	Player
—	DF	BRA	Dija (at XV de Piracicaba until 15 October 2026)
—	DF	BRA	Guilherme Lopes (at Atlético Goianiense until 30 November 2026)
—	DF	BRA	Luan Cândido (at Vitória until 31 December 2026)
—	DF	BRA	Nathan Mendes (at Vitória until 31 December 2026)
—	DF	COL	Sergio Palacios (at Ponte Preta until 30 November 2026)
—	MF	BRA	Alexandre Pena (at Pouso Alegre until 30 September 2026)
—	MF	BRA	André Cardoso (at Londrina until 30 November 2026)
—	MF	BRA	Arthur Sousa (at Houston Dynamo 2 until 31 December 2026)
—	MF	BRA	Caetano (at Hercílio Luz until 30 November 2026)

No.	Pos.	Nation	Player
—	MF	BRA	João Neto (at Paços de Ferreira until 30 June 2027)
—	MF	BRA	Nathan Camargo (at Vila Nova until 30 November 2026)
—	MF	BRA	Riquelme (at FC Liefering until 30 June 2027)
—	FW	BRA	Filipinho (at Avaí until 30 November 2026)
—	FW	URU	Nacho Laquintana (at Vitória until 31 December 2026)
—	FW	URU	Thiago Borbas (at Atlético Mineiro until 31 December 2026)
—	FW	BRA	Vitinho Mota (at Londrina until 30 November 2026)
—	FW	BRA	Yuri Leles (at FC Liefering until 30 June 2027)

== Personnel ==
=== Current staff ===
As of 22 September 2026

Position	Name
Coaching staff
Head coach	(Brazil) Vagner Mancini
Assistant coach	(Brazil) Réver
Fitness coach	(Brazil) Vítor Gonçalves
Goalkeeping coach	(Brazil) Rodrigo Bruns

== Honours ==
=== Official tournaments ===
National
Competitions	Titles	Seasons
Campeonato Brasileiro Série B	2	1989, 2019
Campeonato Brasileiro Série C	1	2007
State
Competitions	Titles	Seasons
Campeonato Paulista	1	1990
Campeonato Paulista Série A2	2	1965, 1988
Campeonato Paulista Segunda Divisão	1^{s}	1979

- record
- ^{s} shared record

=== Others tournaments ===
==== State ====
- Campeonato Paulista do Interior (1): 2020
- Torneio Início (1): 1991

=== Runners-up ===
- Copa Sudamericana (1): 2021
- Campeonato Brasileiro Série A (1): 1991
- Copa Paulista (1): 2006
- Campeonato Paulista Série A2 (4): 1959, 1967, 1982, 2017

=== Youth team ===
- Campeonato Brasileiro Sub-23 (1): 2024

== See also ==
- RB Leipzig
- New York Red Bulls
- FC Red Bull Salzburg
- FC Liefering
- Red Bull Ghana
- RB Omiya Ardija
- Red Bull Bragantino II
- Red Bull Bragantino (women)
