= 2026 Campeonato Brasileiro Série A =

Football league

Campeonato Brasileiro Série A
- Season: 2026
- Dates: 28 January – 2 December 2026
- Champions: Flamengo (9th title)
- Relegated: Chapecoense; Remo
- Copa Libertadores: Flamengo; Palmeiras; Cruzeiro; Fluminense
- Matches: 355
- Goals: 941 (2.65 per match)
- Top goalscorer: Kevin Viveros (21 goals)
- Biggest home win: Vasco da Gama 5–0 Coritiba (19 September); Palmeiras 6–1 Remo (5 November)
- Biggest away win: Chapecoense 0–4 Atlético-MG (2 April); Atlético-MG 0–4 Flamengo (26 April); Chapecoense 0–4 Flamengo (22 July); Vitória 0–4 Palmeiras (29 July); Mirassol 1–5 Flamengo (16 August)
- Highest scoring: Grêmio 5–3 Botafogo (4 February)
- All statistics correct as of 22 November 2026 (2 of 3 matches finished).

The 2026 Campeonato Brasileiro Série A is the 70th season of the Campeonato Brasileiro Série A, the top level of professional football in Brazil, and the 24th edition in a double round-robin since its establishment in 2003. The competition began on 28 January and will end on 2 December 2026, including a month-and-a-half long break for the 2026 FIFA World Cup.

The top five teams as well as the 2026 Copa do Brasil champions and runner-up will qualify for the 2027 Copa Libertadores, a change from previous years when the top six teams and only the Copa do Brasil champions qualified. Meanwhile, the next six best-placed teams not qualified for Copa Libertadores will qualify for the 2027 Copa Sudamericana, and the last four will be relegated to Série B for 2027.

The defending champions Flamengo won their ninth Série A championship in this season, clinching the title with two matches to spare after a 1–1 draw with Palmeiras on 21 November 2026. The tournament was officially named Brasileirão Betano 2026 for sponsorship reasons, but the sponsorship ended in September due to the enactment of the Provisional Measure 1394/2026.

== Teams ==
Twenty teams compete in the league: the top 16 teams from the previous season and four teams promoted from the Série B.

Coritiba became the first club to be promoted on 15 November 2025, after a 0–0 home draw against Athletic-MG. Athletico Paranaense, Chapecoense and Remo all achieved promotion in the last round, on 23 November. Athletico Paranaense and Coritiba returned to Série A after one and two seasons, respectively, Chapecoense returned to the top flight after a four-year absence, and Remo returned to the top flight after a 32-year absence.

Location of teams in 2026 Série A

Pos.	Relegated from 2025 Série A
17th	Ceará
18th	Fortaleza
19th	Juventude
20th	Sport

Pos.	Promoted from 2025 Série B
1st	Coritiba
2nd	Athletico Paranaense
3rd	Chapecoense
4th	Remo

=== Number of teams by state ===
N.T.	State	Team(s)
6	São Paulo	Corinthians, Mirassol, Palmeiras, Red Bull Bragantino, Santos and São Paulo
4	Rio de Janeiro	Botafogo, Flamengo, Fluminense and Vasco da Gama
2	Bahia	Bahia and Vitória
2	Minas Gerais	Atlético Mineiro and Cruzeiro
2	Paraná	Athletico Paranaense and Coritiba
2	Rio Grande do Sul	Grêmio and Internacional
1	Pará	Remo
1	Santa Catarina	Chapecoense

=== Stadiums and locations ===
Team	Location	State	Stadium	Turf	Capacity
Athletico Paranaense	Curitiba	Paraná	Arena da Baixada	Artificial	42,372
Atlético Mineiro	Belo Horizonte	Minas Gerais	Arena MRV	Artificial	44,892
Bahia	Salvador	Bahia	Casa de Apostas Arena Fonte Nova	Natural	50,052
Botafogo	Rio de Janeiro	Rio de Janeiro	Olímpico Nilton Santos	Artificial	44,661
Chapecoense	Chapecó	Santa Catarina	Arena Condá	Artificial	20,089
Corinthians	São Paulo	São Paulo	Neo Química Arena	Hybrid	47,252
Coritiba	Curitiba	Paraná	Couto Pereira	Natural	40,502
Cruzeiro	Belo Horizonte	Minas Gerais	Mineirão	Natural	66,658
Flamengo	Rio de Janeiro	Rio de Janeiro	Maracanã	Hybrid	78,838
Fluminense	Rio de Janeiro	Rio de Janeiro	Maracanã	Hybrid	78,838
Grêmio	Porto Alegre	Rio Grande do Sul	Arena do Grêmio	Hybrid	60,540
Internacional	Porto Alegre	Rio Grande do Sul	Beira-Rio	Natural	49,055
Mirassol	Mirassol	São Paulo	Campos Maia	Natural	14,534
Palmeiras	São Paulo	São Paulo	Nubank Parque	Artificial	43,713
Red Bull Bragantino	Bragança Paulista	São Paulo	Cícero de Souza Marques	Natural	12,000
Remo	Belém	Pará	Mangueirão	Natural	53,645
Santos	Santos	São Paulo	Vila Belmiro	Natural	16,068
São Paulo	São Paulo	São Paulo	MorumBIS	Natural	66,671
Vasco da Gama	Rio de Janeiro	Rio de Janeiro	São Januário	Natural	24,584
Vitória	Salvador	Bahia	Barradão	Natural	30,793

== Personnel and kits ==
Team	Head coach	Captain	Kit manufacturer	Main sponsor	Other sponsors
Athletico Paranaense	(Brazil) Odair Hellmann	(Brazil) Santos	Umbro		List: Front: Copacol; Back: Ademicon; Sleeves: Havan; Shorts: None; Socks: None; Number: None
Atlético Mineiro	(Argentina) Eduardo Domínguez	(Brazil) Everson	Nike		List: Front: Multimarcas Consórcios, Ale, Cemig; Back: Banco BMG, Supermercados BH; Sleeves: Gerdau; Shorts: None; Socks: None; Number: Mundiale
Bahia	(Brazil) Rogério Ceni	(Brazil) Éverton Ribeiro	Puma		List: Front: BYD, Famastil; Back: Banco BMG, Viva Sorte; Sleeves: Canaã Alimentos; Shorts: Atacadão dos Pisos, Axi; Socks: Ingresse; Number: None
Botafogo	(Brazil) Tite	(Brazil) Alex Telles	Mizuno		List: Front: Ava; Back: None; Sleeves: None; Shorts: None; Socks: LifeFit; Number: Oxy Câmaras Hiperbáricas
Chapecoense	(Brazil) Vinícius Bergantin	(Brazil) Eduardo Doma	Kappa	Aurora	List: Front: Premium Lindoia; Back: Sicoob, Grupo Bugio, Unimed; Sleeves: None; Shorts: Agropecuárias Alfa; Socks: None; Number: None
Corinthians	(Netherlands) Clarence Seedorf	(Argentina) Rodrigo Garro	Nike	Shopee	List: Front: BYD, Zé Delivery, Broto Legal, Frimesa, Jota.ai; Back: EZZE Seguros; Sleeves: Banco BMG; Shorts: None; Socks: None; Number: Torcedor Premiado
Coritiba	(Brazil) Guilherme Bossle (caretaker)	(Colombia) Sebastián Gómez	Diadora		List: Front: Ademicon, Foxlux; Back: Paraná Banco; Sleeves: None; Shorts: Master Cargas, DS Peças Automotivas; Socks: None; Number: None
Cruzeiro	(Portugal) Artur Jorge	(Brazil) Lucas Silva	Adidas		List: Front: CIMED, Perdigão Na Brasa; Back: Vilma Alimentos, Supermercados BH; Sleeves: Omo; Shorts: None; Socks: Kodilar Alimentos; Number: None
Flamengo	(Portugal) Leonardo Jardim	(Brazil) Bruno Henrique	Adidas		List: Front: BRB, Ademicon; Back: Lubrax, Assist Card; Sleeves: Shopee; Shorts: GAC Group, WAP, Zé Delivery; Socks: None; Number: Texaco
Fluminense	(Brazil) Marcão (caretaker)	(Brazil) Samuel Xavier	Puma	Superscore	List: Front: Frescatto, Leve; Back: Superscore, Universidade Iguaçu; Sleeves: None; Shorts: Mega Seguros, Zé Delivery; Socks: None; Number: Predialnet
Grêmio	(Brazil) Renato Gaúcho	(Argentina) Walter Kannemann	New Balance	Banrisul	List: Front: Tintas Coral; Back: Banrisul, Unimed; Sleeves: Havan; Shorts: Ingresse; Socks: None; Number: Marquespan
Internacional	(Brazil) Eduardo Baptista	(Brazil) Alan Patrick	Adidas	Banrisul	List: Front: Cigame; Back: Banrisul, Unimed, KNN Idiomas; Sleeves: Vero Banrisul; Shorts: Unifique; Socks: None; Number: Torcedor Premiado
Mirassol	(Brazil) Rafael Guanaes	(Brazil) Reinaldo	Athleta	Guaraná Poty	List: Front: Ruiz Coffees, Seara, Ecori, Rodobens, Constru-sol; Back: Rede Sol Supermercados, Pacaembu Construtora, Indústrias Santa Maria, DS Tecnologia Automotiva; Sleeves: Kodilar Alimentos; Shorts: Lukma; Socks: Lumavi; Number: Mtech
Palmeiras	(Portugal) Abel Ferreira	(Paraguay) Gustavo Gómez	Puma		List: Front: CIMED, Consórcio Embracon; Back: Leapmotor; Sleeves: Sil; Shorts: UNIASSELVI, Moto Chefe; Socks: None; Number: None
Red Bull Bragantino	(Brazil) Vagner Mancini	(Brazil) Cleiton	Puma	Red Bull	List: Front: None; Back: Red Bull, Asaas; Sleeves: None; Shorts: None; Socks: None; Number: None
Remo	(Brazil) Thiago Carpini	(Brazil) Marllon	Volt Sport	Banpará	List: Front: GAV Resorts; Back: Gazin; Sleeves: None; Shorts: None; Socks: None; Number: None
Santos	(Brazil) Cuca	(Brazil) Neymar	Umbro	Agibank	List: Front: Canção Alimentos, NR Sports; Back: BaladAPP, Instituto Neymar JR, Quartzolit; Sleeves: Kicaldo; Shorts: Torcedor Premiado; Socks: None; Number: None
São Paulo	(Brazil) Dorival Júnior	(Argentina) Jonathan Calleri	New Balance		List: Front: Ademicon, Elgin, Moto da Gente; Back: Seguros Unimed; Sleeves: None; Shorts: UniCesumar; Socks: None; Number: eFootball
Vasco da Gama	(Portugal) Pedro Emanuel	(Brazil) Thiago Mendes	Nike		List: Front: Viva Sorte, Allu; Back: Banco BMG, MotoChefe; Sleeves: Zé Delivery; Shorts: Viva Sorte, Facility; Socks: None; Number: R10 Score
Vitória	(Brazil) Rafael Lacerda	(Brazil) Gabriel Baralhas	Volt Sport		List: Front: Viva Sorte, Plano Brasil Saúde, Skokka, BaladAPP, UniAgro; Back: Alpha Consórcios, Supermercados BH; Sleeves: None; Shorts: Use Telecom, Supermercados BH, Vapt Blue Tintas; Socks: None; Number: None

=== Coaching changes ===
Team	Outgoing head coach	Manner of departure	Date of vacancy	Position in table	Incoming head coach	Date of appointment	Ref
Coritiba	(Brazil) Mozart	End of contract	28 November 2025	Pre-season	(Brazil) Fernando Seabra	8 December 2025	
Remo	(Brazil) Guto Ferreira	End of contract	2 December 2025	Pre-season	(Colombia) Juan Carlos Osorio	17 December 2025	
Internacional	(Brazil) Abel Braga	Moved to director role	8 December 2025	Pre-season	(Uruguay) Paulo Pezzolano	18 December 2025	
Grêmio	(Brazil) Mano Menezes	End of contract	9 December 2025	Pre-season	(Portugal) Luís Castro	12 December 2025	
Cruzeiro	(Portugal) Leonardo Jardim	Resigned	15 December 2025	Pre-season	(Brazil) Tite	16 December 2025	
Botafogo	(Italy) Davide Ancelotti	Resigned	17 December 2025	Pre-season	(Argentina) Martín Anselmi	22 December 2025	
Atlético Mineiro	(Argentina) Jorge Sampaoli	Mutual agreement	12 February 2026	14th	(Brazil) Lucas Gonçalves (caretaker)	12 February 2026	
Vasco da Gama	(Brazil) Fernando Diniz	Sacked	22 February 2026	17th	(Brazil) Bruno Lazaroni (caretaker)	22 February 2026	
Atlético Mineiro	(Brazil) Lucas Gonçalves	End of caretaker spell	25 February 2026	17th	(Argentina) Eduardo Domínguez	24 February 2026	
Remo	(Colombia) Juan Carlos Osorio	Sacked	1 March 2026	16th	(Brazil) Flávio Garcia (caretaker)	1 March 2026	
Flamengo	(Brazil) Filipe Luís	Sacked	3 March 2026	11th	(Portugal) Leonardo Jardim	4 March 2026	
Vasco da Gama	(Brazil) Bruno Lazaroni	End of caretaker spell	3 March 2026	20th	(Brazil) Renato Gaúcho	3 March 2026	
Remo	(Brazil) Flávio Garcia	End of caretaker spell	5 March 2026	16th	(Brazil) Léo Condé	5 March 2026	
São Paulo	(Argentina) Hernán Crespo	Sacked	9 March 2026	2nd	(Brazil) Roger Machado	10 March 2026	
Cruzeiro	(Brazil) Tite	Sacked	15 March 2026	19th	(Brazil) Wesley Carvalho (caretaker)	15 March 2026	
Santos	(Argentina) Juan Pablo Vojvoda	Sacked	19 March 2026	16th	(Brazil) Cuca	19 March 2026	
Cruzeiro	(Brazil) Wesley Carvalho	End of caretaker spell	22 March 2026	20th	(Portugal) Artur Jorge	22 March 2026	
Botafogo	(Argentina) Martín Anselmi	Sacked	22 March 2026	15th	(Brazil) Rodrigo Bellão (caretaker)	22 March 2026	
Botafogo	(Brazil) Rodrigo Bellão	End of caretaker spell	2 April 2026	12th	(Portugal) Franclim Carvalho	2 April 2026	
Chapecoense	(Brazil) Gilmar Dal Pozzo	Sacked	3 April 2026	18th	(Brazil) Celso Rodrigues (caretaker)	4 April 2026	
Chapecoense	(Brazil) Celso Rodrigues	End of caretaker spell	5 April 2026	17th	(Brazil) Fábio Matias	5 April 2026	
Corinthians	(Brazil) Dorival Júnior	Sacked	5 April 2026	16th	(Brazil) Fernando Diniz	6 April 2026	
São Paulo	(Brazil) Roger Machado	Sacked	13 May 2026	4th	(Brazil) Dorival Júnior	15 May 2026	
Chapecoense	(Brazil) Fábio Matias	Sacked	25 May 2026	20th	(Brazil) Rafael Lacerda (Note: Celso Rodrigues was the caretaker head coach in the 18th round match against Palmeiras on 31 May.)	26 May 2026	
Vasco	(Brazil) Renato Gaúcho	Mutual agreement	18 June 2026	17th	(Portugal) Pedro Emanuel	10 July 2026	
Fluminense	(Argentina) Luis Zubeldía	Sacked	13 August 2026	4th	(Brazil) Marcão (caretaker)	13 August 2026	
Botafogo	(Portugal) Franclim Carvalho	Sacked	18 August 2026	11th	(Brazil) Rodrigo Bellão (caretaker)	18 August 2026	
Grêmio	(Portugal) Luís Castro	Sacked	13 September 2026	16th	(Brazil) Renato Gaúcho	14 September 2026	
Remo	(Brazil) Léo Condé	Sacked	15 September 2026	19th	(Brazil) Thiago Carpini	16 September 2026	
Botafogo	(Brazil) Rodrigo Bellão	End of caretaker spell	16 September 2026	14th	(Brazil) Tite	16 September 2026	
Internacional	(Uruguay) Paulo Pezzolano	Sacked	20 September 2026	18th	(Brazil) Eduardo Baptista	23 September 2026	
Corinthians	(Brazil) Fernando Diniz	Sacked	7 October 2026	16th	(Brazil) William Batista (caretaker)	8 October 2026	
Corinthians	(Brazil) William Batista	End of caretaker spell	11 October 2026	16th	(Netherlands) Clarence Seedorf (Note: Léo Porto was the caretaker head coach in the 31st round match against Vitória on 19 October, as Seedorf was not registered on time.)	11 October 2026	
Coritiba	(Brazil) Fernando Seabra	Sacked	27 October 2026	12th	(Brazil) Guilherme Bossle (caretaker)	27 October 2026	
Vitória	(Brazil) Jair Ventura	Sacked	2 November 2026	14th	(Brazil) Cleber dos Santos (caretaker)	2 November 2026	
Chapecoense	(Brazil) Rafael Lacerda	Resigned	9 November 2026	20th	(Brazil) Vinícius Bergantin (Note: Rodrigo Chipp will the caretaker head coach in the 21st round match against Vasco da Gama on 14 November.)	13 November 2026	
Vitória	(Brazil) Cleber dos Santos	End of caretaker spell	10 November 2026	15th	(Brazil) Rafael Lacerda	10 November 2026	

== Foreign players ==
The clubs can have a maximum of nine foreign players in their Campeonato Brasileiro squads per match, but there is no limit of foreigners in the clubs' squads.

- Players marked in **bold** indicate they are registered during mid-season transfer window.
- Players marked in italics indicate they had left their respective clubs during mid-season transfer window.

Club	Player 1	Player 2	Player 3	Player 4	Player 5	Player 6	Player 7	Player 8	Player 9	Player 10	Player 11	Player 12	Player 13	Former players
Athletico Paranaense	(Argentina) Bruno Zapelli	(Argentina) Gastón Benavídez	(Argentina) Lucas Esquivel	(Colombia) Alejandro García	(Colombia) Carlos Terán	(Colombia) **Jorge Rivaldo**	(Colombia) Juan Felipe Aguirre	(Colombia) Juan Portilla	(Colombia) **Kerwin Vargas**	(Colombia) Kevin Viveros	(Colombia) Stiven Mendoza	(Ukraine) Maksym Voronov	(Uruguay) Gonzalo Mastriani	
Atlético Mineiro	(Argentina) Tomás Cuello	(Colombia) **Kevin Castaño**	(Colombia) Mateo Casierra	(Ecuador) Alan Franco	(Ecuador) Alan Minda	(Ecuador) Ángelo Preciado	(Guinea) Mamady Cissé	(Uruguay) **Thiago Borbas**						(Chile) Iván Román (Paraguay) Júnior Alonso
Bahia	(Argentina) **Alejo Véliz**	(Argentina) **Guido Herrera**	(Argentina) **Lautaro López**	(Argentina) Mateo Sanabria	(Argentina) Román Gómez	(Spain) **Marco Moreno**	(Uruguay) Cristian Olivera	(Uruguay) Michel Araújo	(Uruguay) Nicolás Acevedo					(Argentina) Santiago Ramos Mingo
Botafogo	(Angola) **Domingos Andrade**	(Argentina) Álvaro Montoro	(Argentina) Cristian Medina	(Colombia) Jhoan Hernández	(Colombia) Jordan Barrera	(Ecuador) Cristhian Loor	(Morocco) **Hakim Ziyech**	(Panama) Kadir Barría	(Uruguay) Lucas Villalba	(Uruguay) Mateo Ponte	(Venezuela) Nahuel Ferraresi			(Angola) Bastos (Argentina) Alexander Barboza (Argentina) Joaquín Correa (Spain) Chris Ramos (Uruguay) Santiago Rodríguez
Chapecoense	(Colombia) **Dylan Borrero**	(Uruguay) **Franco Rossi**	(Uruguay) Kevin Ramírez											(Democratic Republic of the Congo) Yannick Bolasie (Paraguay) Walter Clar
Corinthians	(Argentina) Rodrigo Garro	(England) Jesse Lingard	(Morocco) Zakaria Labyad	(Netherlands) Memphis Depay	(Peru) André Carrillo	(Uruguay) Pedro Milans								
Coritiba	(Colombia) Alejandro Ararat	(Colombia) Sebastián Gómez	(Portugal) Josué Pesqueira	(Uruguay) **Brian Ocampo**	(Uruguay) Joaquín Lavega									
Cruzeiro	(Argentina) **Gabriel Rojas**	(Argentina) Lucas Romero	(Argentina) Lucas Villalba	(Colombia) Luis Sinisterra	(Colombia) Néiser Villarreal	(Ecuador) Keny Arroyo	(Paraguay) **Fabrizio Peralta**	(Uruguay) **Luciano Rodríguez**	(Uruguay) **Matías Viña**					
Flamengo	(Argentina) Agustín Rossi	(Argentina) **Joaquín Freitas**	(Chile) Erick Pulgar	(Colombia) Jorge Carrascal	(Ecuador) **Anthony Valencia**	(Ecuador) Gonzalo Plata	(Spain) Saúl	(Uruguay) Giorgian de Arrascaeta	(Uruguay) Guillermo Varela	(Uruguay) Nicolás de la Cruz				
Fluminense	(Argentina) Germán Cano	(Argentina) Juan Pablo Freytes	(Argentina) Luciano Acosta	(Argentina) Rodrigo Castillo	(Colombia) Julián Millán	(Colombia) Kevin Serna	(Uruguay) Agustín Canobbio	(Venezuela) Jefferson Savarino	(Venezuela) Yeferson Soteldo					(Uruguay) David Terans (Uruguay) Facundo Bernal
Grêmio	(Argentina) Cristian Pavon	(Argentina) Juan Nardoni	(Cape Verde) **Jovane Cabral**	(Colombia) José Enamorado	(Croatia) **Filip Krovinović**	(Denmark) Martin Braithwaite	(Ghana) Francis Amuzu	(Paraguay) Fabián Balbuena	(Paraguay) Mathías Villasanti	(Peru) Erick Noriega				(Argentina) Leonel Pérez (Colombia) Miguel Monsalve
Internacional	(Argentina) Alexandro Bernabei	(Argentina) Braian Aguirre	(Argentina) Gabriel Mercado	(Argentina) Rodrigo Villagra	(Chile) **Guillermo Maripán**	(Colombia) Johan Carbonero	(Ecuador) Félix Torres	(Ghana) Benjamin Arhin	(Paraguay) **Antonio Sanabria**	(Uruguay) Sergio Rochet				(Colombia) Rafael Santos Borré (Uruguay) Alan Rodríguez
Mirassol														(Argentina) Lucas Mugni (Paraguay) Antonio Galeano
Palmeiras	(Argentina) Agustín Giay	(Argentina) **Alexander Barboza**	(Argentina) José Manuel López	(Cameroon) Miguel Bilong	(Colombia) Jhon Arias	(Paraguay) Gustavo Gómez	(Paraguay) Ramón Sosa	(Uruguay) Emiliano Martínez	(Uruguay) Joaquín Piquerez					
Red Bull Bragantino	(Argentina) José María Herrera	(Colombia) Henry Mosquera	(Ecuador) José Hurtado	(Paraguay) Isidro Pitta	(Uruguay) Agustín Sant'Anna	(Uruguay) Guzmán Rodríguez	(Uruguay) Ignacio Sosa							
Remo	(Cameroon) Duplexe Tchamba	(Colombia) **Andrés González**	(Paraguay) **Antonio Galeano**	(Uruguay) Cristian Tassano	(Uruguay) Franco Catarozzi	(Uruguay) Nicolás Ferreira								(Argentina) Braian Cufré (Argentina) Rafael Monti (Colombia) Víctor Cantillo (Greece) Panagiotis Tachtsidis (Guinea-Bissau) João Pedro (Uruguay) Diego Hernández
Santos	(Argentina) Álvaro Barreal	(Argentina) Benjamín Rollheiser	(Argentina) Gonzalo Escobar	(Bolivia) Miguel Terceros	(Paraguay) **Gustavo Caballero**	(Uruguay) Christian Oliva	(Venezuela) Nicola Profeta							(Argentina) Adonis Frías (Argentina) Lautaro Díaz (Venezuela) Tomás Rincón
São Paulo	(Argentina) Enzo Díaz	(Argentina) Jonathan Calleri	(Ecuador) Robert Arboleda	(Paraguay) Damián Bobadilla	(Portugal) **Aurélio Buta**	(Portugal) Cédric Soares	(Portugal) **Domingos Duarte**							(Argentina) Alan Franco (Chile) Gonzalo Tapia
Vasco da Gama	(Angola) **Loide Augusto**	(Argentina) **Alan Lescano**	(Argentina) Claudio Spinelli	(Argentina) **Facundo Colidio**	(Argentina) **Santiago Sosa**	(Colombia) Andrés Gómez	(Colombia) Carlos Cuesta	(Colombia) Johan Rojas	(Colombia) Marino Hinestroza	(Portugal) Nuno Moreira	(Uruguay) Alan Saldivia	(Uruguay) Puma Rodríguez		
Vitória	(Argentina) Diego Tarzia	(Argentina) **Emanuel Brítez**	(Argentina) Emmanuel Martínez	(Argentina) **Tomás Pochettino**	(Ecuador) Kike Saverio	(Portugal) Rúben Ismael								(Spain) Aitor Cantalapiedra (Uruguay) Renzo López

=== Dual nationality ===
Players who are Brazilian nationals but also hold dual citizenship or represent another FIFA nation in international football are not regarded as foreign players and do not take up a foreign player slot.

- (Uruguay) Lucas Monzón (Botafogo)
- (Spain) Miguel Carvalho (Chapecoense)
- (Belgium) Wanderson (Cruzeiro)
- (Japan) Kaique Kenji (Cruzeiro)
- (Italy) Jorginho (Flamengo)
- (Mexico) Matheus Reis (Fluminense)
- (Argentina) Walter Kannemann (Grêmio)
- (Sweden) Niclas Eliasson (Internacional)
- (South Korea) Chico (Mirassol)
- (Paraguay) Maurício (Palmeiras)
- (Italy) Rafael Tolói (São Paulo)
- (Paraguay) Carlos Coronel (São Paulo)
- (Italy) Lucas Piton (Vasco da Gama)

== Standings ==
=== League table ===
Pos	Team	Pld	W	D	L	GF	GA	GD	Pts	Qualification or relegation
1	Flamengo (C, Q)	36	24	8	4	74	31	+43	80	Qualification for Copa Libertadores group stage
2	Palmeiras (Q)	36	21	11	4	64	26	+38	74	Qualification for Copa Libertadores group stage
3	Cruzeiro (Q)	36	20	6	10	59	50	+9	66	Qualification for Copa Libertadores group stage
4	Fluminense (T)	36	18	9	9	57	42	+15	63	Qualification for Copa Libertadores group stage
5	Athletico Paranaense (X)	36	16	9	11	56	47	+9	57	Qualification for Copa Libertadores second stage (Note: Since Palmeiras, who qualified for the Copa Libertadores group stage on league performance, reached the 2026 Copa do Brasil final, the Copa Libertadores second stage berth allocated to the 2026 Copa do Brasil runners-up was passed to the Série A's highest-placed team not already qualified.)
6	Bahia (X)	36	14	12	10	50	46	+4	54	Qualification for Copa Libertadores second stage
7	Atlético Mineiro (X)	35	14	9	12	44	40	+4	51	Qualification for Copa Sudamericana group stage
8	Santos	35	13	11	11	51	49	+2	50	Qualification for Copa Sudamericana group stage
9	Red Bull Bragantino	35	13	8	14	45	41	+4	47	Qualification for Copa Sudamericana group stage
10	Vasco da Gama	35	13	8	14	47	51	−4	47	Qualification for Copa Sudamericana group stage
11	Coritiba	36	12	9	15	41	52	−11	45	Qualification for Copa Sudamericana group stage
12	São Paulo	35	12	8	15	39	40	−1	44	Qualification for Copa Sudamericana group stage
13	Botafogo	35	11	9	15	46	57	−11	42	
14	Vitória	35	11	8	16	37	52	−15	41	
15	Mirassol	36	10	11	15	39	49	−10	41	
16	Corinthians	35	10	10	15	40	42	−2	40	
17	Internacional	35	9	11	15	39	44	−5	38	Relegation to Campeonato Brasileiro Série B
18	Grêmio (Note: Grêmio qualified for the Copa Libertadores group stage as 2026 Copa do Brasil champions or runners-up. If they are relegated, their berth will be passed to the Série A's highest-placed team not already qualified.)	35	9	11	15	38	47	−9	38	Relegation to Campeonato Brasileiro Série B
19	Remo (R)	36	7	11	18	41	61	−20	32	Relegation to Campeonato Brasileiro Série B
20	Chapecoense (R)	36	4	9	23	34	74	−40	21	Relegation to Campeonato Brasileiro Série B

Updated to match(es) played on 22 November 2026 (2 of 3 matches finished). Source: CBF
Rules for classification: 1) points; 2) wins; 3) goal difference; 4) goals scored; 5) head-to-head results (only between two teams); 6) fewest red cards; 7) fewest yellow cards; 8) drawing of lots.
(C) Champions; (Q) Qualified for the phase indicated; (R) Relegated; (T) Qualified, but not yet for the particular phase indicated; (X) Assured of Copa Sudamericana, but may still qualify for Copa Libertadores

== Results ==
Home \ Away	CAP	CAM	BAH	BOT	CHA	COR	CTB	CRU	FLA	FLU	GRE	INT	MIR	PAL	RBB	REM	SAN	SPA	VAS	VIT
Athletico Paranaense	—	2–2	2–1	4–1	2–0	0–1	2–0	2–1	1–1	3–3	0–0	2–0	1–0	0–2	1–1	4–2	2–1		1–3	3–1
Atlético Mineiro	2–1	—	1–1	1–1	1–1		1–0	0–1	0–4	3–1	3–0	1–0	3–1	2–2	1–0	3–3	2–1	1–0		2–1
Bahia	3–0		—	2–1	2–0	1–1	0–1	1–2	0–3	1–1	1–1	3–2	1–0	1–2	2–0	2–1	2–2	3–2	0–0	1–1
Botafogo	2–3	1–0		—	1–0	3–1	2–2	4–0	0–3	1–1	3–2	2–2	3–2	0–0	1–1	1–2	2–1		1–2	0–0
Chapecoense	1–4	0–4	3–3	1–4	—	0–0	3–3	1–2	0–4	2–1	1–1	1–2	1–2		1–2	2–3	4–2	1–0	0–2	1–1
Corinthians	0–0	1–0	1–2	4–0	1–2	—	0–2	1–2	1–1	1–3		0–1	2–0	0–0	2–0	3–0	0–1	3–2	1–0	1–1
Coritiba	3–3	2–0	3–2	1–1	2–1	2–1	—	0–1		1–1	0–1	2–2	1–2	1–3	0–1	1–0	0–1	0–1	1–1	2–0
Cruzeiro	3–1	1–3	3–2	0–1	2–1	1–1	1–2	—	2–1	1–1	2–0		3–1	2–1	2–1	1–0	0–0	2–0	3–3	3–0
Flamengo	2–1	3–2	2–0	3–0		2–1	3–0	2–0	—	1–0	3–1	1–1	2–0	0–3	2–1	3–0	3–1	1–1	2–2	2–0
Fluminense	3–2	1–0	0–0	1–0	2–1	3–1	4–0		1–2	—	2–1	2–1	1–0	3–2	1–1	2–1	1–2	2–1	1–0	2–2
Grêmio	2–0	2–1	0–0	5–3	3–1	1–3	1–0	2–4	0–1	1–1	—	1–1		0–0	1–1	0–0	3–2	2–1	1–2	2–0
Internacional	0–1	0–0	0–1	3–0	2–0	2–1	1–0	1–2	1–1	2–0	0–0	—	1–2	1–3		1–1	2–3	1–1	4–1	
Mirassol		0–0	1–2	2–0	1–1	2–1	0–1	2–2	1–5	1–0	2–1	2–0	—	1–1	0–1	2–1	2–2	1–1	2–1	2–2
Palmeiras	1–0	1–2	1–0	2–1	1–0	4–1		1–1	1–1	2–1	2–1	0–0	1–0	—	2–0	6–1	1–1	2–0	4–1	5–1
Red Bull Bragantino	1–1	1–0	2–3	1–2	3–0	0–2	0–0	4–2	3–0		1–0	3–1	1–1	0–1	—	4–2	2–1	1–2		2–0
Remo	1–2	2–2	4–1	2–1	2–0		2–3	0–1	0–1	0–2	1–1	1–1	2–2	1–1	1–1	—	1–2	1–0	1–1	2–0
Santos	0–2	1–0	1–1		2–2	1–1	0–3	2–1	2–2	2–3		1–2	1–1	0–0	2–0	2–0	—	1–1	2–1	3–1
São Paulo	1–2	2–0	2–2	1–1	2–0	0–0	1–1	4–1	2–1	0–1	2–0	1–0	1–0	0–1	2–1		1–2	—	1–0	2–1
Vasco da Gama	1–0	0–1	0–1	1–2	1–1	3–2	5–0	3–1	1–4	3–2	2–1	2–1	1–1	2–1	0–3	0–0	0–3	2–1	—	
Vitória	1–1	2–0	0–2	1–0	4–0	0–0	4–1	1–3	1–2	0–3	1–0	2–0	1–0	0–4	2–1	2–0		2–0	1–0	—

Updated to match(es) played on 22 November 2026 (2 of 3 matches finished). Source: CBF
Legend: Blue = home team win; Yellow = draw; Red = away team win.

== Season statistics ==
As of 22 November 2026 (2 of 3 matches finished)

=== Top scorers ===
Rank	Player	Club	Goals
1	(Colombia) Kevin Viveros	Athletico Paranaense	21
2	(Brazil) Pedro	Flamengo	20
3	(Brazil) Gabriel Barbosa	Santos	16
4	(Brazil) Kaio Jorge	Cruzeiro	14
5	(Brazil) Samuel Lino	Flamengo	13
6	(Brazil) Matheus Pereira	Cruzeiro	11
6	(Brazil) Luciano Juba	Bahia	11
6	(Brazil) Carlos Vinícius	Grêmio	11
6	(Brazil) Renê	Vitória	11
10	(Argentina) José Manuel López	Palmeiras	10
10	(Brazil) Danilo Santos	Botafogo	10
10	(Argentina) Jonathan Calleri	São Paulo	10
10	(Brazil) Jajá	Remo	10
10	(Paraguay) Maurício	Palmeiras	10

Source: Soccerway

=== Hat-tricks ===
Player	For	Against	Result	Date	Ref.
(Brazil) Carlos Vinícius	Grêmio	Botafogo	5–3 (H)	4 February 2026	
(Brazil) Ferreira	São Paulo	Cruzeiro	4–1 (H)	4 April 2026	
(Brazil) Arthur Cabral	Botafogo	Corinthians	3–1 (H)	17 May 2026	
(Venezuela) Jefferson Savarino	Fluminense	Coritiba	4–0 (H)	8 October 2026	
(Brazil) Kaio Jorge	Cruzeiro	Grêmio	4–2 (A)	18 October 2026	
(Brazil) Kaio César	Corinthians	Botafogo	4–0 (H)	18 November 2026	

=== Top assists ===
Rank	Player	Club	Assists
1	(Portugal) Josué Pesqueira	Coritiba	11
2	(Brazil) Andreas Pereira	Palmeiras	10
3	(Brazil) Samuel Lino	Flamengo	9
3	(Colombia) Jorge Carrascal	Flamengo	9
5	(Brazil) Matheus Pereira	Cruzeiro	7
5	(Argentina) José Manuel López	Palmeiras	7
5	(Brazil) Hulk	Atlético Mineiro / Fluminense	7
5	(Brazil) Erick	Vitória	7
5	(Ecuador) Keny Arroyo	Cruzeiro	7
5	(Argentina) Rodrigo Garro	Corinthians	7
5	(Brazil) Giovanni Augusto	Chapecoense	7
5	(Brazil) João Cruz	Athletico Paranaense	7
5	(Uruguay) Guillermo Varela	Flamengo	7

Source: Soccerway

=== Clean sheets ===
Rank	Player	Club	Clean sheets
1	(Brazil) Carlos Miguel	Palmeiras	15
2	(Argentina) Agustín Rossi	Flamengo	14
3	(Brazil) Hugo Souza	Corinthians	12
4	(Brazil) Lucas Arcanjo	Vitória	10
5	(Brazil) Ronaldo	Bahia	9
5	(Brazil) Fábio	Fluminense	9
5	(Brazil) Weverton	Grêmio	9
8	(Brazil) Rafael	São Paulo	8
9	(Brazil) Santos	Athletico Paranaense	7
9	(Brazil) Everson	Atlético Mineiro	7

Source: FBref.com

== See also ==
- 2026 Campeonato Brasileiro Série B
- 2026 Campeonato Brasileiro Série C
- 2026 Campeonato Brasileiro Série D
