= 2024 Campeonato Brasileiro Série B =

Football competition held in Brazil

Campeonato Brasileiro Série B
- Season: 2024
- Dates: 19 April – 24 November
- Champions: Santos (1st title)
- Promoted: Ceará; Mirassol; Santos; Sport
- Relegated: Brusque; Guarani; Ituano; Ponte Preta
- Matches: 380
- Goals: 832 (2.19 per match)
- Top goalscorer: Erick Pulga (13 goals)
- Biggest home win: Five matches 4–0
- Biggest away win: Four matches 0–4
- Highest scoring: 8 goals Ituano 3–5 Paysandu; R10, 15 June
- Longest winning run: 7 games Goiás
- Longest unbeaten run: 12 games Novorizontino
- Longest winless run: 13 games CRB; Guarani
- Longest losing run: 5 games Brusque; Ponte Preta

The 2024 Campeonato Brasileiro Série B (officially the Brasileirão Série B Betnacional 2024 for sponsorship reasons) was a football competition held in Brazil, equivalent to the second division. The competition began on 19 April and ended on 24 November.

Twenty teams competed in the tournament, twelve returning from the 2023 season, four promoted from the 2023 Campeonato Brasileiro Série C (Amazonas, Brusque, Operário Ferroviário and Paysandu), and four relegated from the 2023 Campeonato Brasileiro Série A (América Mineiro, Coritiba, Goiás and Santos). This was the first Série B played by Santos in their history.

The top four teams were promoted to the 2025 Campeonato Brasileiro Série A. Santos became the first club to be promoted on 11 November 2024 after a 0–2 win against Coritiba. Ceará, Mirassol and Sport were promoted on 24 November 2024.

Brusque, Guarani, Ituano and Ponte Preta were relegated to the 2025 Campeonato Brasileiro Série C.

== Teams ==
Twenty teams competed in the league – twelve teams from the previous season, as well as four teams promoted from the Série C, and four teams relegated from the Série A.

Location of teams in 2024 Série B

| Pos. | Relegated from 2023 Série A |
|---|---|
| 17th | Santos |
| 18th | Goiás |
| 19th | Coritiba |
| 20th | América Mineiro |

| Pos. | Promoted from 2023 Série C |
|---|---|
| 1st | Amazonas |
| 2nd | Brusque |
| 3rd | Operário Ferroviário |
| 4th | Paysandu |

=== Number of teams by state ===
| Number of teams | State | Team(s) |
|---|---|---|
| 7 | São Paulo | Botafogo-SP, Guarani, Ituano, Mirassol, Novorizontino, Ponte Preta and Santos |
| 3 | Santa Catarina | Avaí, Brusque and Chapecoense |
| 2 | Goiás | Goiás and Vila Nova |
| 2 | Paraná | Coritiba and Operário Ferroviário |
| 1 | Alagoas | CRB |
| 1 | Amazonas | Amazonas |
| 1 | Ceará | Ceará |
| 1 | Minas Gerais | América Mineiro |
| 1 | Pará | Paysandu |
| 1 | Pernambuco | Sport |

=== Stadiums and locations ===
| Team | Home city | State | Stadium | Capacity |
|---|---|---|---|---|
| Amazonas | Manaus | Amazonas | Municipal Carlos Zamith | 5,000 |
| Amazonas | Manaus | Amazonas | Arena da Amazônia | 44,000 |
| América Mineiro | Belo Horizonte | Minas Gerais | Arena Independência | 23,018 |
| Avaí | Florianópolis | Santa Catarina | Ressacada | 17,826 |
| Botafogo-SP | Ribeirão Preto | São Paulo | Santa Cruz | 29,292 |
| Brusque | Brusque | Santa Catarina | Augusto Bauer | 5,000 |
| Brusque | Brusque | Santa Catarina | Hercílio Luz (Itajaí) | 6,010 |
| Brusque | Brusque | Santa Catarina | Ressacada (Florianópolis) | 17,826 |
| Brusque | Brusque | Santa Catarina | Arena Joinville (Joinville) | 17,515 |
| Ceará | Fortaleza | Ceará | Castelão | 63,903 |
| Ceará | Fortaleza | Ceará | Presidente Vargas | 20,262 |
| Chapecoense | Chapecó | Santa Catarina | Arena Condá | 20,089 |
| Coritiba | Curitiba | Paraná | Couto Pereira | 40,502 |
| CRB | Maceió | Alagoas | Rei Pelé | 17,126 |
| Goiás | Goiânia | Goiás | Estádio da Serrinha | 14,450 |
| Guarani | Campinas | São Paulo | Brinco de Ouro | 29,130 |
| Ituano | Itu | São Paulo | Novelli Júnior | 18,560 |
| Mirassol | Mirassol | São Paulo | Campos Maia | 15,000 |
| Novorizontino | Novo Horizonte | São Paulo | Doutor Jorge Ismael de Biasi | 16,000 |
| Operário Ferroviário | Ponta Grossa | Paraná | Germano Krüger | 10,632 |
| Paysandu | Belém | Pará | Curuzu | 16,200 |
| Paysandu | Belém | Pará | Mangueirão | 53,635 |
| Ponte Preta | Campinas | São Paulo | Moisés Lucarelli | 19,728 |
| Santos | Santos | São Paulo | Urbano Caldeira | 16,068 |
| Santos | Santos | São Paulo | Estádio do Café (Londrina) | 31,000 |
| Sport | Recife | Pernambuco | Ilha do Retiro | 32,983 |
| Sport | Recife | Pernambuco | Arena Pernambuco (São Lourenço da Mata) | 44,300 |
| Vila Nova | Goiânia | Goiás | Onésio Brasileiro Alvarenga | 6,500 |

== Personnel and kits ==
| Team | Head coach | Captain | Kit manufacturer | Main kit sponsor |
|---|---|---|---|---|
| Amazonas | (Brazil) Ibson Silva (caretaker) | (Brazil) Fabiano | Onça (club manufactured kit) | Reals, TVLar, Protteina Distribuidora |
| América Mineiro | (Brazil) Diogo Giacomini (caretaker) | (Brazil) Juninho | Volt Sport | EstrelaBet |
| Avaí | (Brazil) Enderson Moreira | (Brazil) Vágner Love | Volt Sport | PixBet |
| Botafogo-SP | (Brazil) Márcio Zanardi | (Brazil) Douglas Baggio | Volt Sport | EstrelaBet, Nicnet |
| Brusque | (Brazil) Marcelo Cabo | (Brazil) Wallace | Finta | HAVAN, Bet7k, Buettner por Bouton |
| Ceará | (Brazil) Léo Condé | (Brazil) Luiz Otávio | Vozão (club manufactured kit) | Esportes da Sorte, Matrix Energia |
| Chapecoense | (Brazil) Gilmar Dal Pozzo | (Brazil) Bruno Leonardo | Umbro | Aurora, Sicoob MaxiCrédito |
| Coritiba | (Brazil) Guilherme Bossle (caretaker) | (Colombia) Sebastián Gómez | Diadora | Reals |
| CRB | (Brazil) Hélio dos Anjos | (Brazil) Anselmo Ramon | Regatas (club manufactured kit) | EstrelaBet |
| Goiás | (Brazil) Vagner Mancini | (Brazil) Lucas Ribeiro | Gr33n (club manufactured kit) | BETesporte |
| Guarani | (Brazil) Allan Aal | (Brazil) Matheus Salustiano | Kappa | Única Saúde, ASA Alumínio, StarsTEA, Furacão Distribuidora |
| Ituano | (Brazil) Chico Elias (caretaker) | (Brazil) Jefferson Paulino | Alluri | Bet7k, HARAS Coração de Cavalo, Starrett |
| Mirassol | (Brazil) Mozart | (Brazil) Gabriel | Athleta | Guaraná Poty, Bet7k |
| Novorizontino | (Brazil) Eduardo Baptista | (Brazil) Renato Palm | Physicus | Açúcar Santa Isabel, Bet7k, Cenemed |
| Operário Ferroviário | (Brazil) Rafael Guanaes | (Brazil) Willian Machado | Karilu | Bet7k, Ambilight TV, Guararapes Painéis, Colchões Ecoflex, GMAD, Makita |
| Paysandu | (Brazil) Márcio Fernandes | (Brazil) Robinho | Lobo (club manufactured kit) | Banpará, Betnacional, Fatal Model |
| Ponte Preta | (Brazil) João Brigatti | (Brazil) Élvis | Diadora | EstrelaBet, DESKTOP |
| Santos | (Brazil) Leandro Zago (caretaker) | (Brazil) Diego Pituca | Umbro | Blaze, AQBank |
| Sport | (Portugal) Pepa | (Brazil) Rafael Thyere | Umbro | BetVip |
| Vila Nova | (Brazil) Thiago Carvalho | (Brazil) Ralf | Volt Sport, V43 (club manufactured kit) | Tintas Luztol, BETesporte, Rizzo Imobiliária, Fatal Model |

=== Coaching changes ===
| Team | Outgoing head coach | Manner of departure | Date of vacancy | Position in table | Incoming head coach | Date of appointment | Ref |
|---|---|---|---|---|---|---|---|
| Botafogo-SP | (Brazil) José Leão | End of caretaker spell | 25 November 2023 | Pre-season | (Portugal) Paulo Gomes | 29 November 2023 | |
| Sport | (Brazil) César Lucena | End of caretaker spell | 25 November 2023 | Pre-season | (Argentina) Mariano Soso | 5 December 2023 | |
| América Mineiro | (Brazil) Diogo Giacomini | End of caretaker spell | 6 December 2023 | Pre-season | (Brazil) Cauan de Almeida | 18 December 2023 | |
| Goiás | (Brazil) Mário Henrique | End of caretaker spell | 6 December 2023 | Pre-season | (Brazil) Zé Ricardo | 25 December 2023 | |
| Santos | (Brazil) Marcelo Fernandes | End of caretaker spell | 6 December 2023 | Pre-season | (Brazil) Fábio Carille | 19 December 2023 | |
| Guarani | (Brazil) Umberto Louzer | Sacked | 9 February 2024 | State leagues | (Brazil) Claudinei Oliveira (Note: Rodrigo Leitão was the caretaker head coach in a Campeonato Paulista match against Novorizontino on 12 February) | 12 February 2024 | |
| Chapecoense | (Brazil) Claudinei Oliveira | Sacked | 10 February 2024 | State leagues | (Brazil) Umberto Louzer | 11 February 2024 | |
| Ituano | (Brazil) Marcinho Freitas | Sacked | 23 February 2024 | State leagues | (Brazil) Douglas Leite (caretaker) | 23 February 2024 | |
| Ituano | (Brazil) Douglas Leite | End of caretaker spell | 26 February 2024 | State leagues | (Brazil) Alberto Valentim | 26 February 2024 | |
| Vila Nova | (Brazil) Higo Magalhães | Mutual agreement | 17 March 2024 | State leagues | (Brazil) Márcio Fernandes | 18 March 2024 | |
| Goiás | (Brazil) Zé Ricardo | Mutual agreement | 25 March 2024 | State leagues | (Brazil) Márcio Zanardi | 31 March 2024 | |
| Amazonas | (Brazil) Luizinho Vieira | Sacked | 16 April 2024 | State leagues | (Brazil) Adilson Batista | 16 April 2024 | |
| Avaí | (Brazil) Eduardo Barroca | Sacked | 26 April 2024 | 18th | (Brazil) Marquinhos Santos (caretaker) | 29 April 2024 | |
| Guarani | (Brazil) Claudinei Oliveira | Sacked | 27 April 2024 | 19th | (Brazil) Júnior Rocha | 2 May 2024 | |
| Coritiba | (Brazil) Guto Ferreira | Sacked | 3 May 2024 | 7th | (Brazil) James Freitas (caretaker) | 6 May 2024 | |
| Avaí | (Brazil) Marquinhos Santos | End of caretaker spell | 6 May 2024 | 18th | (Brazil) Gilmar Dal Pozzo | 6 May 2024 | |
| Brusque | (Brazil) Luizinho Lopes | Sacked | 20 May 2024 | 16th | (Brazil) Luizinho Vieira | 20 May 2024 | |
| Vila Nova | (Brazil) Márcio Fernandes | Sacked | 22 May 2024 | 7th | (Brazil) Luizinho Lopes | 23 May 2024 | |
| Amazonas | (Brazil) Adilson Batista | Mutual agreement | 23 May 2024 | 15th | (Brazil) Rafael Lacerda | 24 May 2024 | |
| Ponte Preta | (Brazil) João Brigatti | Resigned | 27 May 2024 | 15th | (Brazil) Nelsinho Baptista | 29 May 2024 | |
| Guarani | (Brazil) Júnior Rocha | Sacked | 9 June 2024 | 20th | (Brazil) Marcelo Cordeiro (caretaker) | 11 June 2024 | |
| Coritiba | (Brazil) James Freitas | End of caretaker spell | 12 June 2024 | 9th | (Brazil) Fábio Matias | 12 June 2024 | |
| Guarani | (Brazil) Marcelo Cordeiro | End of caretaker spell | 19 June 2024 | 20th | (Brazil) Pintado | 19 June 2024 | |
| Ceará | (Brazil) Vagner Mancini | Sacked | 26 June 2024 | 11th | (Brazil) Léo Condé (Note: Anderson Batatais was the caretaker head coach in the 13th round match against Ituano on 29 June) | 27 June 2024 | |
| Coritiba | (Brazil) Fábio Matias | Sacked | 23 July 2024 | 14th | (Brazil) Guilherme Bossle (caretaker) | 23 July 2024 | |
| Sport | (Argentina) Mariano Soso | Sacked | 25 July 2024 | 7th | (Brazil) Guto Ferreira (Note: César Lucena was the caretaker head coach in the 18th round match against Ponte Preta on 27 July) | 26 July 2024 | |
| Guarani | (Brazil) Pintado | Sacked | 26 July 2024 | 20th | (Brazil) Marcelo Cordeiro (caretaker) | 26 July 2024 | |
| Coritiba | (Brazil) Guilherme Bossle | End of caretaker spell | 27 July 2024 | 13th | (Brazil) Jorginho | 27 July 2024 | |
| Guarani | (Brazil) Marcelo Cordeiro | End of caretaker spell | 29 July 2024 | 20th | (Brazil) Allan Aal | 29 July 2024 | |
| Goiás | (Brazil) Márcio Zanardi | Sacked | 4 August 2024 | 10th | (Brazil) Vagner Mancini | 6 August 2024 | |
| Chapecoense | (Brazil) Umberto Louzer | Resigned | 4 August 2024 | 17th | (Brazil) Tcheco (Note: Celso Rodrigues was the caretaker head coach in the 19th round match against Mirassol on 5 August) | 5 August 2024 | |
| Avaí | (Brazil) Gilmar Dal Pozzo | Sacked | 5 August 2024 | 11th | (Brazil) Enderson Moreira | 5 August 2024 | |
| Chapecoense | (Brazil) Tcheco | Sacked | 18 August 2024 | 11th | (Brazil) Gilmar Dal Pozzo (Note: Celso Rodrigues was the caretaker head coach in the 22nd round match against América Mineiro on 21 August) | 20 August 2024 | |
| América Mineiro | (Brazil) Cauan de Almeida | Sacked | 27 August 2024 | 6th | (Brazil) Lisca | 28 August 2024 | |
| Sport | (Brazil) Guto Ferreira | Sacked | 28 August 2024 | 10th | (Brazil) César Lucena (caretaker) | 29 August 2024 | |
| Sport | (Brazil) César Lucena | End of caretaker spell | 3 September 2024 | 7th | (Portugal) Pepa | 3 September 2024 | |
| CRB | (Brazil) Daniel Paulista | Sacked | 4 September 2024 | 16th | (Brazil) Bruno Pivetti | 6 September 2024 | |
| Paysandu | (Brazil) Hélio dos Anjos | Sacked | 6 September 2024 | 15th | (Brazil) Márcio Fernandes | 9 September 2024 | |
| Brusque | (Brazil) Luizinho Vieira | Sacked | 8 September 2024 | 18th | (Brazil) Marcelo Cabo | 9 September 2024 | |
| CRB | (Brazil) Bruno Pivetti | Sacked | 20 September 2024 | 18th | (Brazil) Hélio dos Anjos | 20 September 2024 | |
| Botafogo-SP | (Portugal) Paulo Gomes | Sacked | 25 September 2024 | 15th | (Brazil) Márcio Zanardi (Note: Ivan Izzo will be the caretaker head coach in the 29th round match against Vila Nova on 28 September) | 27 September 2024 | |
| Vila Nova | (Brazil) Luizinho Lopes | Sacked | 20 October 2024 | 6th | (Brazil) Thiago Carvalho | 20 October 2024 | |
| Ituano | (Brazil) Alberto Valentim | Sacked | 20 October 2024 | 19th | (Brazil) Chico Elias (caretaker) | 20 October 2024 | |
| Ponte Preta | (Brazil) Nelsinho Baptista | Resigned | 21 October 2024 | 17th | (Brazil) Nenê Santana (caretaker) | 21 October 2024 | |
| Ponte Preta | (Brazil) Nenê Santana | End of caretaker spell | 6 November 2024 | 17th | (Brazil) João Brigatti | 6 November 2024 | |
| Coritiba | (Brazil) Jorginho | Mutual agreement | 11 November 2024 | 10th | (Brazil) Guilherme Bossle (caretaker) (Note: Caretaker until the end of the season.) | 11 November 2024 | |
| Santos | (Brazil) Fábio Carille | Mutual agreement | 18 November 2024 | 1st | (Brazil) Leandro Zago (caretaker) | 18 November 2024 | |
| América Mineiro | (Brazil) Lisca | Mutual agreement | 19 November 2024 | 9th | (Brazil) Diogo Giacomini (caretaker) | 19 November 2024 | |
| Amazonas | (Brazil) Rafael Lacerda | Mutual agreement | 19 November 2024 | 12th | (Brazil) Ibson Silva (caretaker) | 19 November 2024 | |

== Foreign players ==
The clubs could have a maximum of nine foreign players in their Campeonato Brasileiro squads per match, but there was no limit of foreigners in the clubs' squads.

| Club | Player 1 | Player 2 | Player 3 | Player 4 | Player 5 | Player 6 | Player 7 | Player 8 |
|---|---|---|---|---|---|---|---|---|
| Amazonas | (Argentina) Alexis Alvariño | (Argentina) Diego Torres | (Belgium) Josh Eppiah | (Ecuador) Jonny Uchuari | (Paraguay) Jorge Jiménez | | | |
| América Mineiro | (Argentina) Martín Benítez | (Argentina) Fernando Elizari | | | | | | |
| Avaí | | | | | | | | |
| Botafogo-SP | (Argentina) Leandro Maciel | (Ecuador) Orlando Herrera | (Ghana) Sabit Abdulai | | | | | |
| Brusque | (Colombia) Jhan Pool Torres | (Uruguay) Agustín González | (Uruguay) Matías Ocampo | (Uruguay) Rodrigo Pollero | | | | |
| Ceará | (Argentina) Lucas Mugni | (Ghana) Steven Nufour | (Paraguay) Jorge Recalde | (Portugal) Rafael Ramos | (Uruguay) Facundo Barceló | (Uruguay) Facundo Castro | | |
| Chapecoense | (Paraguay) Walter Clar | | | | | | | |
| Coritiba | (Colombia) Sebastián Gómez | (Ecuador) Erick Castillo | (Portugal) Josué Pesqueira | | | | | |
| CRB | (Ecuador) Luis Segovia | (Uruguay) Facundo Labandeira | | | | | | |
| Goiás | (Colombia) Ángelo Rodríguez | (Colombia) Jhon Vásquez | | | | | | |
| Guarani | | | | | | | | |
| Ituano | | | | | | | | |
| Mirassol | | | | | | | | |
| Novorizontino | (Paraguay) Óscar Ruiz | | | | | | | |
| Operário Ferroviário | (Paraguay) Santiago Ocampos | | | | | | | |
| Paysandu | (Argentina) Benjamín Borasi | (Cameroon) Joel Tagueu | (Colombia) Yony González | (Ecuador) Juan Cazares | (Uruguay) Yeferson Quintana | (Venezuela) Esli García | | |
| Ponte Preta | (Argentina) Gabriel Risso Patrón | (Bolivia) Luis Haquín | | | | | | |
| Santos | (Argentina) Gonzalo Escobar | (Argentina) Julio Furch | (Bolivia) Miguel Terceros | (Ecuador) Billy Arce | (The Gambia) Yusupha Njie | (Uruguay) Ignacio Laquintana | (Venezuela) Rómulo Otero | (Venezuela) Tomás Rincón |
| Sport | (Argentina) Leonel Di Plácido | (Argentina) Julián Fernández | (Argentina) Christian Ortiz | (Colombia) Helibelton Palacios | (Uruguay) Fabricio Domínguez | | | |
| Vila Nova | (Colombia) Juan Sebastián Quintero | (Panama) Eric Davis | (Uruguay) Alex Silva | | | | | |

=== Players holding Brazilian dual nationality ===
They did not take foreign slot.

- (Bolivia) Enzo Monteiro (Santos)

== League table ==
| Pos | Team | Pld | W | D | L | GF | GA | GD | Pts | Promotion or relegation |
|---|---|---|---|---|---|---|---|---|---|---|
| 1 | Santos (C, P) | 38 | 20 | 8 | 10 | 57 | 32 | +25 | 68 | Promotion to 2025 Campeonato Brasileiro Série A |
| 2 | Mirassol (P) | 38 | 19 | 10 | 9 | 42 | 26 | +16 | 67 | Promotion to 2025 Campeonato Brasileiro Série A |
| 3 | Sport (P) | 38 | 19 | 9 | 10 | 57 | 37 | +20 | 66 | Promotion to 2025 Campeonato Brasileiro Série A |
| 4 | Ceará (P) | 38 | 19 | 7 | 12 | 59 | 41 | +18 | 64 | Promotion to 2025 Campeonato Brasileiro Série A |
| 5 | Novorizontino | 38 | 18 | 10 | 10 | 43 | 31 | +12 | 64 | |
| 6 | Goiás | 38 | 18 | 9 | 11 | 56 | 32 | +24 | 63 | |
| 7 | Operário Ferroviário | 38 | 16 | 10 | 12 | 34 | 32 | +2 | 58 | |
| 8 | América Mineiro | 38 | 15 | 13 | 10 | 50 | 35 | +15 | 58 | |
| 9 | Vila Nova | 38 | 16 | 7 | 15 | 42 | 54 | −12 | 55 | |
| 10 | Avaí | 38 | 14 | 11 | 13 | 34 | 32 | +2 | 53 | |
| 11 | Amazonas | 38 | 14 | 10 | 14 | 31 | 37 | −6 | 52 | |
| 12 | Coritiba | 38 | 14 | 8 | 16 | 41 | 44 | −3 | 50 | |
| 13 | Paysandu | 38 | 12 | 14 | 12 | 41 | 43 | −2 | 50 | |
| 14 | Botafogo-SP | 38 | 11 | 12 | 15 | 36 | 51 | −15 | 45 | |
| 15 | Chapecoense | 38 | 11 | 11 | 16 | 34 | 45 | −11 | 44 | |
| 16 | CRB | 38 | 11 | 10 | 17 | 38 | 45 | −7 | 43 | |
| 17 | Ponte Preta (R) | 38 | 10 | 8 | 20 | 37 | 55 | −18 | 38 | Relegation to 2025 Campeonato Brasileiro Série C |
| 18 | Ituano (R) | 38 | 11 | 4 | 23 | 43 | 63 | −20 | 37 | Relegation to 2025 Campeonato Brasileiro Série C |
| 19 | Brusque (R) | 38 | 8 | 12 | 18 | 24 | 44 | −20 | 36 | Relegation to 2025 Campeonato Brasileiro Série C |
| 20 | Guarani (R) | 38 | 8 | 9 | 21 | 33 | 53 | −20 | 33 | Relegation to 2025 Campeonato Brasileiro Série C |

Source: CBF
Rules for classification: 1) points; 2) wins; 3) goal difference; 4) goals scored; 5) head-to-head results (only between 2 teams); 6) fewest red cards; 7) fewest yellow cards; 8) drawing of lots.
(C) Champions; (P) Promoted; (R) Relegated

=== Positions by round ===
The table lists the positions of teams after each week of matches. In order to preserve chronological evolvements, any postponed matches were not included to the round at which they were originally scheduled, but added to the full round they were played immediately afterwards.

| Team ╲ Round | 1 | 2 | 3 | 4 | 5 | 6 | 7 | 8 | 9 | 10 | 11 | 12 | 13 | 14 | 15 | 16 | 17 | 18 | 19 | 20 | 21 | 22 | 23 | 24 | 25 | 26 | 27 | 28 | 29 | 30 | 31 | 32 | 33 | 34 | 35 | 36 | 37 | 38 |
|---|---|---|---|---|---|---|---|---|---|---|---|---|---|---|---|---|---|---|---|---|---|---|---|---|---|---|---|---|---|---|---|---|---|---|---|---|---|---|
| Amazonas | 14 | 14 | 18 | 15 | 15 | 15 | 14 | 15 | 12 | 14 | 15 | 14 | 14 | 16 | 15 | 15 | 14 | 15 | 13 | 13 | 12 | 10 | 12 | 12 | 9 | 11 | 9 | 11 | 11 | 10 | 11 | 10 | 11 | 12 | 11 | 11 | 12 | 11 |
| América Mineiro | 10 | 6 | 8 | 4 | 5 | 4 | 2 | 5 | 1 | 1 | 1 | 1 | 3 | 2 | 3 | 3 | 3 | 5 | 5 | 4 | 4 | 5 | 6 | 8 | 7 | 7 | 6 | 6 | 7 | 5 | 7 | 7 | 8 | 7 | 9 | 9 | 9 | 8 |
| Avaí | 16 | 18 | 17 | 14 | 11 | 6 | 4 | 2 | 4 | 2 | 2 | 2 | 1 | 5 | 6 | 9 | 10 | 10 | 11 | 10 | 7 | 6 | 7 | 5 | 8 | 8 | 7 | 9 | 9 | 9 | 10 | 11 | 12 | 11 | 12 | 12 | 11 | 10 |
| Botafogo-SP | 11 | 12 | 13 | 18 | 17 | 18 | 20 | 17 | 17 | 16 | 13 | 12 | 12 | 14 | 17 | 17 | 17 | 17 | 16 | 16 | 16 | 14 | 14 | 14 | 13 | 13 | 14 | 15 | 16 | 17 | 14 | 16 | 17 | 15 | 14 | 14 | 16 | 14 |
| Brusque | 1 | 8 | 12 | 16 | 16 | 16 | 17 | 19 | 19 | 17 | 17 | 18 | 18 | 18 | 18 | 18 | 18 | 18 | 18 | 18 | 19 | 19 | 18 | 17 | 19 | 19 | 19 | 17 | 18 | 19 | 18 | 18 | 19 | 19 | 19 | 19 | 19 | 19 |
| Ceará | 8 | 13 | 14 | 10 | 6 | 8 | 6 | 4 | 7 | 9 | 10 | 11 | 9 | 11 | 14 | 12 | 8 | 7 | 6 | 7 | 9 | 8 | 5 | 6 | 5 | 6 | 8 | 7 | 6 | 7 | 6 | 5 | 6 | 5 | 5 | 4 | 4 | 4 |
| Chapecoense | 2 | 3 | 4 | 6 | 8 | 10 | 11 | 12 | 13 | 12 | 12 | 16 | 16 | 12 | 16 | 16 | 16 | 16 | 17 | 17 | 18 | 17 | 19 | 19 | 18 | 17 | 17 | 14 | 13 | 14 | 16 | 13 | 15 | 13 | 15 | 15 | 14 | 15 |
| Coritiba | 9 | 7 | 10 | 13 | 10 | 12 | 7 | 9 | 9 | 8 | 7 | 8 | 8 | 10 | 10 | 13 | 15 | 13 | 15 | 14 | 13 | 11 | 8 | 11 | 10 | 12 | 11 | 8 | 8 | 12 | 8 | 8 | 9 | 9 | 10 | 10 | 10 | 12 |
| CRB | 15 | 15 | 15 | 11 | 13 | 11 | 13 | 14 | 15 | 18 | 18 | 17 | 17 | 17 | 13 | 11 | 11 | 11 | 12 | 12 | 15 | 16 | 16 | 16 | 17 | 18 | 18 | 19 | 17 | 15 | 17 | 15 | 16 | 17 | 16 | 16 | 15 | 16 |
| Goiás | 13 | 5 | 3 | 2 | 3 | 2 | 3 | 1 | 2 | 4 | 6 | 7 | 5 | 9 | 9 | 7 | 7 | 9 | 10 | 9 | 8 | 7 | 9 | 9 | 11 | 9 | 10 | 12 | 12 | 11 | 12 | 12 | 10 | 8 | 6 | 6 | 6 | 6 |
| Guarani | 20 | 19 | 20 | 17 | 18 | 19 | 19 | 20 | 20 | 20 | 20 | 20 | 20 | 20 | 20 | 20 | 20 | 20 | 20 | 20 | 20 | 20 | 20 | 20 | 20 | 20 | 20 | 20 | 20 | 20 | 20 | 20 | 20 | 20 | 20 | 20 | 20 | 20 |
| Ituano | 17 | 20 | 19 | 20 | 19 | 20 | 15 | 18 | 18 | 19 | 19 | 19 | 19 | 19 | 19 | 19 | 19 | 19 | 19 | 19 | 17 | 18 | 17 | 18 | 16 | 16 | 16 | 18 | 19 | 18 | 19 | 19 | 18 | 18 | 18 | 18 | 18 | 18 |
| Mirassol | 18 | 10 | 11 | 7 | 9 | 5 | 8 | 6 | 3 | 6 | 8 | 9 | 10 | 6 | 8 | 5 | 5 | 3 | 3 | 3 | 1 | 3 | 3 | 2 | 3 | 3 | 5 | 4 | 4 | 4 | 4 | 4 | 4 | 4 | 3 | 2 | 2 | 2 |
| Novorizontino | 6 | 11 | 6 | 9 | 12 | 13 | 10 | 11 | 11 | 11 | 11 | 10 | 11 | 7 | 7 | 4 | 4 | 2 | 2 | 2 | 3 | 1 | 1 | 1 | 1 | 1 | 1 | 1 | 1 | 1 | 2 | 3 | 3 | 2 | 2 | 3 | 3 | 5 |
| Operário Ferroviário | 7 | 4 | 5 | 5 | 7 | 9 | 12 | 8 | 8 | 5 | 3 | 3 | 4 | 8 | 4 | 6 | 6 | 8 | 8 | 8 | 10 | 12 | 11 | 10 | 12 | 10 | 12 | 10 | 10 | 8 | 9 | 9 | 7 | 10 | 7 | 7 | 7 | 7 |
| Paysandu | 19 | 16 | 16 | 19 | 20 | 17 | 18 | 16 | 16 | 15 | 16 | 15 | 15 | 15 | 12 | 10 | 13 | 14 | 14 | 15 | 14 | 15 | 15 | 15 | 15 | 14 | 15 | 16 | 14 | 16 | 13 | 14 | 13 | 14 | 13 | 13 | 13 | 13 |
| Ponte Preta | 12 | 17 | 9 | 12 | 14 | 14 | 16 | 13 | 14 | 13 | 14 | 13 | 13 | 13 | 11 | 14 | 12 | 12 | 9 | 11 | 11 | 13 | 13 | 13 | 14 | 15 | 13 | 13 | 15 | 13 | 15 | 17 | 14 | 16 | 17 | 17 | 17 | 17 |
| Santos | 3 | 1 | 1 | 3 | 1 | 1 | 1 | 3 | 5 | 7 | 5 | 5 | 2 | 1 | 1 | 1 | 1 | 1 | 1 | 1 | 2 | 2 | 2 | 3 | 2 | 2 | 2 | 2 | 2 | 2 | 1 | 1 | 1 | 1 | 1 | 1 | 1 | 1 |
| Sport | 5 | 2 | 2 | 1 | 2 | 3 | 5 | 7 | 6 | 3 | 4 | 6 | 7 | 4 | 5 | 8 | 9 | 6 | 7 | 5 | 6 | 9 | 10 | 7 | 6 | 4 | 4 | 3 | 3 | 3 | 3 | 2 | 2 | 3 | 4 | 5 | 5 | 3 |
| Vila Nova | 4 | 9 | 7 | 8 | 4 | 7 | 9 | 10 | 10 | 10 | 9 | 4 | 6 | 3 | 2 | 2 | 2 | 4 | 4 | 6 | 5 | 4 | 4 | 4 | 4 | 5 | 3 | 5 | 5 | 6 | 5 | 6 | 5 | 6 | 8 | 8 | 8 | 9 |

| Champions, promoted to Campeonato Brasileiro Série A |
| Promotion to Campeonato Brasileiro Série A |
| Relegation to Campeonato Brasileiro Série C |

Source: CBF

== Results ==
| Home \ Away | AMA | AME | AVA | BSP | BRU | CEA | CHA | COR | CRB | GOI | GUA | ITU | MIR | NOV | OPE | PAY | PON | SAN | SPO | VIL |
|---|---|---|---|---|---|---|---|---|---|---|---|---|---|---|---|---|---|---|---|---|
| Amazonas | | 1–0 | 2–1 | 0–1 | 2–1 | 1–1 | 0–1 | 1–0 | 2–0 | 0–4 | 1–1 | 1–0 | 1–0 | 1–0 | 2–1 | 1–1 | 2–1 | 1–0 | 2–3 | 1–2 |
| América Mineiro | 0–0 | | 1–1 | 3–1 | 3–0 | 2–2 | 0–0 | 2–1 | 2–1 | 2–2 | 3–0 | 3–2 | 0–0 | 2–0 | 2–0 | 2–0 | 2–0 | 2–1 | 2–1 | 3–1 |
| Avaí | 1–1 | 2–2 | | 1–1 | 0–0 | 0–1 | 0–0 | 1–0 | 2–1 | 2–0 | 3–2 | 2–0 | 0–0 | 0–1 | 1–0 | 1–0 | 2–1 | 0–2 | 0–2 | 3–0 |
| Botafogo-SP | 0–1 | 1–1 | 1–3 | | 2–2 | 1–4 | 0–0 | 2–0 | 0–0 | 1–0 | 3–2 | 0–1 | 0–0 | 0–1 | 0–0 | 1–1 | 2–0 | 0–1 | 1–1 | 1–0 |
| Brusque | 1–0 | 0–0 | 0–0 | 0–1 | | 1–0 | 0–1 | 0–1 | 1–2 | 0–2 | 2–1 | 1–0 | 3–1 | 0–0 | 0–0 | 1–0 | 0–0 | 0–1 | 1–0 | 3–1 |
| Ceará | 2–1 | 1–0 | 2–0 | 4–1 | 1–0 | | 2–1 | 1–0 | 2–2 | 1–1 | 3–1 | 4–2 | 1–2 | 1–0 | 2–1 | 2–1 | 1–0 | 0–1 | 0–0 | 4–0 |
| Chapecoense | 2–0 | 2–2 | 1–0 | 1–1 | 1–1 | 2–1 | | 2–1 | 0–0 | 0–4 | 0–4 | 3–1 | 0–1 | 0–2 | 0–1 | 1–2 | 0–0 | 3–2 | 1–1 | 1–1 |
| Coritiba | 3–1 | 1–0 | 1–0 | 1–3 | 1–0 | 3–1 | 1–0 | | 2–1 | 0–0 | 1–0 | 4–2 | 0–1 | 2–2 | 3–0 | 1–1 | 1–1 | 0–2 | 0–1 | 1–1 |
| CRB | 0–0 | 2–1 | 1–2 | 4–1 | 1–1 | 0–2 | 2–0 | 2–1 | | 0–1 | 1–0 | 1–0 | 0–1 | 0–1 | 1–1 | 3–2 | 0–1 | 1–1 | 1–1 | 1–0 |
| Goiás | 1–0 | 2–1 | 2–1 | 4–0 | 4–1 | 2–1 | 1–2 | 1–1 | 1–1 | | 1–0 | 2–0 | 0–1 | 1–0 | 3–0 | 1–1 | 3–0 | 3–1 | 3–0 | 0–1 |
| Guarani | 0–0 | 1–2 | 0–0 | 2–0 | 1–0 | 0–0 | 0–1 | 2–1 | 2–1 | 2–3 | | 3–3 | 1–0 | 0–2 | 0–1 | 0–0 | 1–1 | 1–1 | 0–1 | 2–0 |
| Ituano | 0–1 | 0–0 | 0–1 | 3–2 | 1–1 | 1–2 | 2–1 | 0–1 | 1–2 | 1–0 | 1–0 | | 3–2 | 1–3 | 0–2 | 3–5 | 2–0 | 0–2 | 1–0 | 0–0 |
| Mirassol | 0–0 | 1–0 | 0–0 | 1–2 | 2–0 | 3–2 | 1–0 | 4–1 | 1–0 | 1–0 | 3–0 | 2–0 | | 1–0 | 1–0 | 2–1 | 3–0 | 0–0 | 0–0 | 1–0 |
| Novorizontino | 1–1 | 1–1 | 2–0 | 2–0 | 1–0 | 0–3 | 1–0 | 0–0 | 2–1 | 2–1 | 1–1 | 1–0 | 1–1 | | 0–1 | 1–1 | 2–1 | 3–1 | 1–3 | 2–0 |
| Operário Ferroviário | 1–0 | 1–0 | 1–0 | 0–1 | 0–0 | 0–0 | 3–2 | 2–1 | 2–0 | 2–0 | 1–0 | 1–2 | 1–1 | 0–0 | | 1–1 | 1–1 | 1–0 | 2–1 | 2–3 |
| Paysandu | 0–1 | 2–0 | 0–0 | 1–1 | 1–0 | 2–1 | 2–0 | 2–1 | 1–1 | 1–1 | 2–1 | 1–0 | 0–0 | 1–3 | 1–1 | | 1–0 | 0–3 | 0–1 | 2–1 |
| Ponte Preta | 3–0 | 0–2 | 1–0 | 1–0 | 2–0 | 3–1 | 0–2 | 1–1 | 4–2 | 1–1 | 0–1 | 1–4 | 4–2 | 1–0 | 0–1 | 1–2 | | 1–2 | 0–4 | 2–0 |
| Santos | 0–0 | 2–1 | 0–1 | 1–2 | 4–0 | 1–0 | 1–0 | 4–0 | 0–2 | 2–0 | 4–1 | 2–0 | 3–2 | 1–1 | 1–0 | 2–0 | 2–2 | | 1–1 | 3–0 |
| Sport | 3–2 | 1–1 | 1–2 | 3–1 | 4–1 | 2–1 | 1–1 | 0–1 | 2–0 | 1–1 | 4–0 | 3–2 | 1–0 | 1–2 | 1–2 | 1–0 | 3–1 | 2–1 | | 2–0 |
| Vila Nova | 1–0 | 1–0 | 2–1 | 1–1 | 2–2 | 3–2 | 3–2 | 0–3 | 1–0 | 1–0 | 2–0 | 3–4 | 1–0 | 2–1 | 1–0 | 2–2 | 2–1 | 1–1 | 2–0 | |

Source: CBF
Legend: Blue = home team win; Yellow = draw; Red = away team win.

== Top goalscorers ==
| Rank | Player | Club | Goals |
|---|---|---|---|
| 1 | (Brazil) Erick Pulga | Ceará | 13 |
| 2 | (Brazil) Alesson | Vila Nova | 11 |
| 2 | (Brazil) Caio Dantas | Guarani | 11 |
| 2 | (Brazil) Saulo Mineiro | Ceará | 11 |
| 5 | (Brazil) Anselmo Ramon | CRB | 10 |
| 5 | (Brazil) Aylon | Ceará | 10 |
| 5 | (Brazil) Dellatorre | Mirassol | 10 |
| 5 | (Uruguay) Fabricio Domínguez | Sport | 10 |
| 5 | (Venezuela) Esli García | Paysandu | 10 |
| 5 | (Brazil) Guilherme | Santos | 10 |
| 5 | (Brazil) Matheus Frizzo | Coritiba | 10 |

Source: CBF

== Attendances ==
| # | Football club | Average attendance |
|---|---|---|
| 1 | Ceará | 28,120 |
| 2 | Sport | 18,005 |
| 3 | Coritiba | 13,857 |
| 4 | Paysandu | 12,426 |
| 5 | Santos | 10,065 |
| 6 | Amazonas | 7,140 |
| 7 | Avaí | 6,544 |
| 8 | CRB | 6,234 |
| 9 | Goiás | 6,057 |
| 10 | Vila Nova | 5,655 |
| 11 | Chapecoense | 5,131 |
| 12 | Ponte Preta | 5,127 |
| 13 | Guarani | 4,108 |
| 14 | Novorizontino | 3,635 |
| 15 | Operário Ferroviário | 3,467 |
| 16 | Mirassol | 3,331 |
| 17 | Botafogo-SP | 3,086 |
| 18 | América Mineiro | 3,042 |
| 19 | Ituano | 2,005 |
| 20 | Brusque | 1,536 |
