= Wesley Carvalho =

Brazilian football manager (born 1974)

Personal information
- Full name: Wesley Oliveira de Carvalho
- Date of birth: 4 June 1974 (age 52)
- Place of birth: Itapetinga, Brazil
- Position: Goalkeeper

Team information
- Current team: Cruzeiro (assistant)

Youth career
- Years: Team
- Vitória

Managerial career
- 2010–2012: Vitória U17
- 2012–2017: Vitória U20
- 2015: Vitória (interim)
- 2017: Vitória (interim)
- 2017: Palmeiras U20
- 2017: Palmeiras (assistant)
- 2018–2021: Palmeiras U20
- 2018: Palmeiras (interim)
- 2022: Athletico Paranaense U23
- 2022: Athletico Paranaense (interim)
- 2023–2024: Athletico Paranaense (assistant)
- 2023: Athletico Paranaense (interim)
- 2024–: Cruzeiro (assistant)
- 2025: Cruzeiro (interim)
- 2026: Cruzeiro (interim)

Wesley Oliveira de Carvalho (born 4 June 1974) is a Brazilian football coach. He is the current assistant coach of Cruzeiro.

== Career ==
Born in Itapetinga, Bahia, Carvalho played was a goalkeeper in Vitória's youth setup, being Dida's backup during the 1993 Copa São Paulo de Futebol Júnior. He never played professionally during his career, but still joined the very same club in 1997, as a goalkeeping coach.

Carvalho left the club in 2003, and returned on two more occasions, being manager of the under-17s and the under-20s in the latter. On 20 May 2015, after Claudinei Oliveira's dismissal, he was named interim manager of the main squad in the Série B; he left the post a couple of weeks later, with three wins in four matches.

On 2 May 2017, Carvalho was again interim of the first team, replacing sacked Argel Fucks. Late in the month, after winning the year's Campeonato Baiano, he moved to Palmeiras and took over the under-20 squad. In October, he became Alberto Valentim's assistant in the first team, but returned to his previous role ahead of the 2018 season.

In July 2018, Carvalho was Verdão's interim for one match, a 3–0 win over Paraná. On 24 August 2021, he left the club on a mutual agreement.

On 25 January 2022, it was announced that Carvalho would be the new under-20 manager of Santos, but instead he moved to Athletico Paranaense to become their under-23 manager on 9 February. On 5 May, after the club dismissed assistants Maurício Souza and Bruno Lazaroni, he was named interim head coach of the side for one match.

An assistant of the first team for the 2023 campaign, Carvalho was named Athletico's interim head coach on 16 June 2023, after the sacking of Paulo Turra. He returned to the assistant role at the end of the season, and left the club on 15 March 2024.

On 11 August 2024, Carvalho joined Cruzeiro as a permanent assistant coach. The following 27 January, he was named interim head coach, after Fernando Diniz was sacked.

Back to an assistant role after the arrival of Leonardo Jardim, Carvalho was again named interim head coach on 15 March 2026, after Tite was dismissed. He returned to his assistant role seven days later, after the club announced Artur Jorge as head coach.

== Managerial statistics ==
As of 23 March 2026

Managerial record by team and tenure
Team	Nat.	From	To	Record								Ref
Team	Nat.	From	To	G	W	D	L	GF	GA	GD	Win %	Ref
Vitória (interim)	(Brazil)	20 May 2015	6 June 2015	4	3	0	1	9	5	+4	75.00	
Vitória (interim)	(Brazil)	2 May 2017	11 May 2017	1	0	1	0	0	0	+0	0.00	
Palmeiras (interim)	(Brazil)	26 July 2018	29 July 2018	1	1	0	0	3	0	+3	100.00	
Athletico Paranaense U23	(Brazil)	9 February 2022	31 December 2022	5	3	0	2	12	7	+5	60.00	
Athletico Paranaense (interim)	(Brazil)	5 May 2022	7 May 2022	1	1	0	0	1	0	+1	100.00	
Athletico Paranaense (interim)	(Brazil)	16 June 2023	7 December 2023	33	11	13	9	44	37	+7	33.33	
Cruzeiro (interim)	(Brazil)	27 January 2025	9 February 2025	4	2	1	1	8	5	+3	50.00	
Cruzeiro (interim)	(Brazil)	15 March 2026	22 March 2026	2	0	1	1	1	2	−1	0.00	
Career total				51	21	16	14	78	56	+22	41.18	—

== Honours ==
Vitória

- Campeonato Baiano: 2017
