= Carlos Leiria =

Brazilian football manager (born 1983)

Personal information
- Full name: Carlos Eduardo Leiria Oliveira D'Alessandro
- Date of birth: 21 April 1983 (age 43)
- Place of birth: Pelotas, Brazil

Team information
- Current team: Itaquaquecetuba AC (head coach)

Managerial career
- Years: Team
- 2005–2011: Juventude (youth)
- 2012: Desportivo Brasil U20
- 2012–2017: Internacional U20
- 2017: Resende
- 2018: Ceará U20
- 2018: Figueirense U20
- 2019–2021: Corinthians U15
- 2020: Corinthians U20 (interim)
- 2021: San Francisco
- 2022: Resende U17
- 2022–2023: Resende U20
- 2023: Resende (interim)
- 2024: Resende
- 2024–2025: Botafogo U20
- 2025: Botafogo (interim)
- 2025: Campinense U20
- 2026: Itaquaquecetuba AC U20
- 2026–: Itaquaquecetuba AC

Carlos Eduardo Leiria Oliveira D'Alessandro (born 21 April 1983) is a Brazilian football coach, currently the head coach of Itaquaquecetuba AC.

== Career ==
Born in Pelotas, Rio Grande do Sul, Leiria began his career with the youth sides of Juventude. In April 2012, after a short spell in charge of Desportivo Brasil's under-20 squad, he took over Internacional in the same category.

On 24 May 2017, Leiria was named head coach of Resende's first team. He was sacked on 21 December, after a poor start in the 2018 Campeonato Carioca.

In February 2018, Leiria was named in charge of Ceará's under-20 team, but left in June and subsequently joined Figueirense under the same role. In December, he signed for Corinthians, being initially an under-15 coach.

On 21 September 2020, Leiria was named interim head coach of Corinthians' under-20 squad, after Dyego Coelho was became an interim of the main squad. He left the club the following 8 June, after being named manager of San Francisco FC in Panama.

Leiria was dismissed from San Francisco on 20 September 2021, after seven winless matches. He returned to Resende in the following year, being initially an under-17 coach before taking over the under-20s later on.

On 13 July 2023, Leiria was named interim head coach of Resende, replacing sacked Eudes Pedro. On 22 March 2024, he was confirmed as head coach of the club for the season, but was sacked on 1 July.

On 4 July 2024, Leiria joined Botafogo as an under-20 coach. In December, he was confirmed as an interim coach for the first rounds of the 2025 Campeonato Carioca as the main squad were out on vacation, but remained in charge of the main squad, after Artur Jorge left.

On 13 February 2025, Botafogo announced the return of Cláudio Caçapa as a permanent assistant coach and then interim head coach of the first team, and Leiria returned to the under-20 squad. Less than a month later, he was dismissed from the club, and subsequently replaced by Rodrigo Bellão.

On 14 May 2025, Leiria was announced at Campinense as their under-20 coach. In September, after the signing of Evaristo Piza as head coach of the first team, he departed the club, and was announced at newly-created side Itaquaquecetuba AC for their under-20 squad.

After leading IAC to the round of 16 in the 2026 Copa São Paulo de Futebol Júnior, Leiria was confirmed as head coach of the main squad on 28 January of that year.
