= Leonardo Porto =

Brazilian football manager

Léo Porto
Personal information
- Full name: Leonardo Porto Siqueira
- Date of birth: 3 April 1986 (age 40)
- Place of birth: Santa Maria, Brazil

Team information
- Current team: Corinthians (assistant)

Managerial career
- Years: Team
- 2013: Juventus-SP U15 (assistant)
- 2013: Fortaleza (assistant)
- 2014: Atlético Goianiense (assistant)
- 2021–2026: Fortaleza (assistant)
- 2021: Fortaleza (interim)
- 2023–2026: Fortaleza U20
- 2026–: Corinthians (assistant)
- 2026: Corinthians (interim)

Leonardo "Léo" Porto Siqueira (born 3 April 1986) is a Brazilian football coach, currently the assistant coach of Corinthians.

== Career ==
Born in Santa Maria, Rio Grande do Sul, Porto was a futsal player before retiring and starting a physical education degree in São Paulo. He started his career at Juventus-SP's under-15 squad before joining Hélio dos Anjos' assistant at Fortaleza in 2013, as an analyst and assistant.

After working with Hélio dos Anjos at Atlético Goianiense, Porto joined Dorival Júnior's staff at Santos in November 2015, as an analyst. He subsequently worked in the same role with Dorival at São Paulo, Flamengo and Athletico Paranaense.

On 23 December 2020, Porto returned to Fortaleza as a permanent assistant manager of the club. In April 2021, after the dismissal of Enderson Moreira, he was named interim manager.

Porto's first match in charge of the Leão occurred on 1 May 2021, a 4–1 Campeonato Cearense home success over Caucaia. He returned to his previous role three days later, after the appointment of Juan Pablo Vojvoda.

After the departure of Leandro Zago, Porto became the head coach of the under-20 team in May 2023, while still an assistant of the main squad. He left the under-20 team on 11 February 2026, only remaining as an assistant, but departed Fortaleza on 25 March.

In April 2026, Porto joined Corinthians as an assistant of Fernando Diniz. He remained at the club after Diniz was dismissed, and was an interim head coach in the match against Vitória on 19 October, as head coach Clarence Seedorf was not registered on time.
