= Clássico da Saudade =

Brazilian football derby

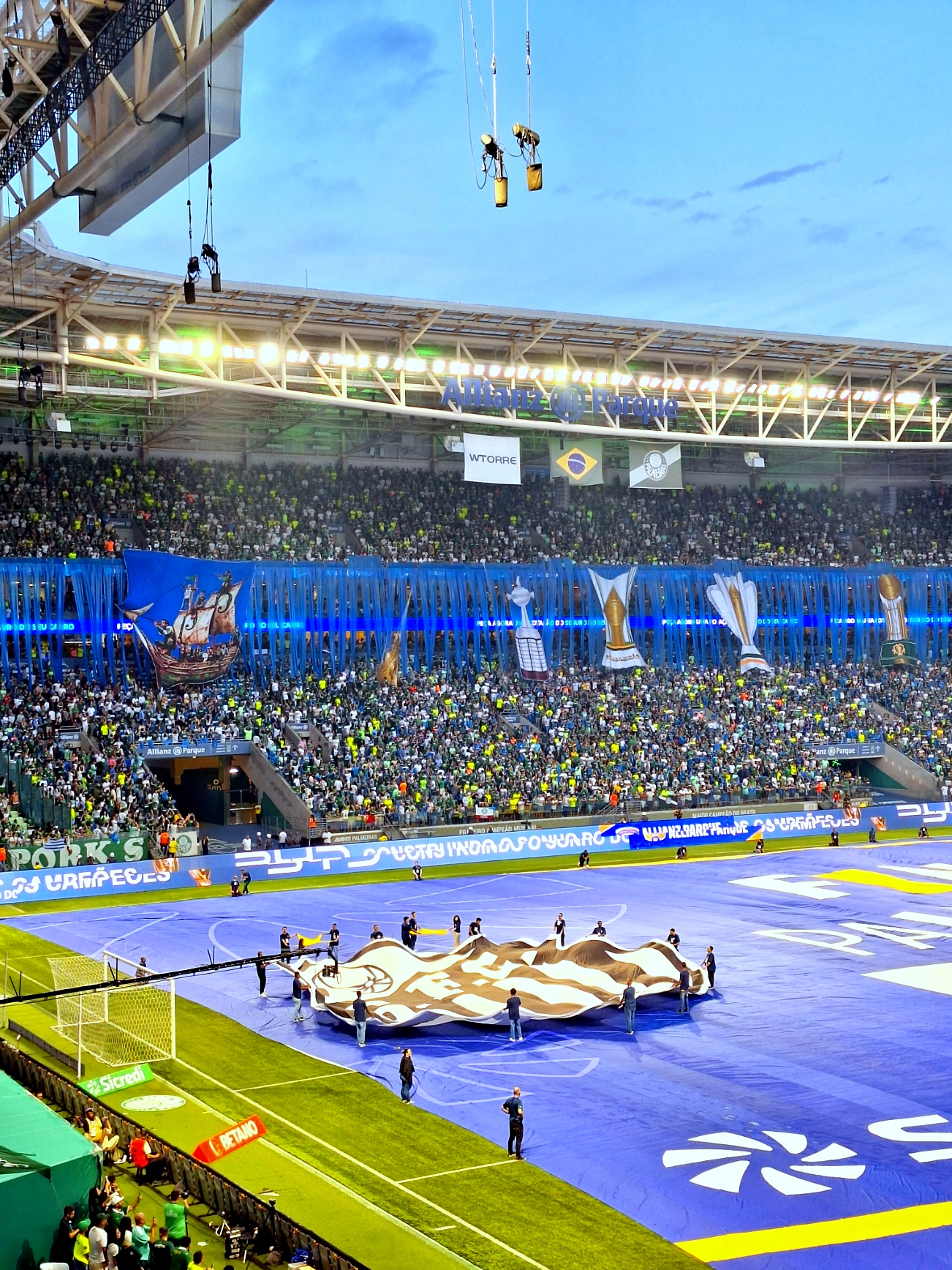
- Allianz Parque before the 2024 Campeonato Paulista final match between Palmeiras and Santos

- Palmeiras Santos
- Location: State of São Paulo
- First meeting: 3 October 1915; Friendly match Santos 7–0 Palestra Italia
- Latest meeting: 28 October 2026; Brazil Série A Santos 0–0 Palmeiras
- Stadiums: Nubank Parque (Palmeiras); Vila Belmiro (Santos)

Statistics
- Total meetings: 351
- Most wins: Palmeiras (152)
- Top scorer: Pelé (32)
- All-time series: Palmeiras: 152; Drawn: 91; Santos: 108
- Largest victory: Palestra Italia 8–0 Santos; Campeonato Paulista; 11 December 1932

The Clássico da Saudade (roughly translated as 'Derby of Nostalgia') is the Brazilian football derby between Palmeiras and Santos, both clubs from state of São Paulo.

The match features the two most successful clubs in the history of Brazil's top division, with Palmeiras having won 12 league titles and Santos winning 8. It dates from back from 1916 and is considered one of the biggest and most important derbies in the State of São Paulo and in Brazil. As of 2026, it is the only Brazilian local derby to have taken place in a Copa Libertadores final, in 2020.

== Statistics ==
=== Head to head results ===
As of 28 October 2026

Competition	Games	Palmeiras wins	Draws	Santos wins	Palmeiras goals	Santos goals
Copa Libertadores	1	1	0	0	1	0
Campeonato Brasileiro Série A	84	26	29	30	105	109
Copa do Brasil	6	2	3	1	8	5
Torneio Rio-São Paulo (Note: In 1933, two matches were simultaneously valid for the Torneio Rio-São Paulo and for the Campeonato Paulista of that season. Both of them were won by Palmeiras, the first by 3–1 and the second, 4–3. In this table, those matches are only being considered as Campeonato Paulista games so they are not counted twice.)	20	7	3	10	39	43
Campeonato Paulista	200	100	45	55	356	260
Other competitions and friendly matches	39	16	11	12	81	69
Total	351	152	91	108	590	486
Torneio Início	9	4	4	1	7	4
Total general	360	156	95	109	597	490

=== Records ===
==== Largest victories ====
- Palestra Italia 8–0 Santos (11 December 1932)
- Santos 7–0 Palestra Italia (3 October 1915)
- Palmeiras 7–1 Santos (30 April 1965)
- Santos 0–6 Palmeiras (24 March 1996)
- Palestra Italia 1–6 Santos (12 April 1939)
- Santos 6–1 Palmeiras (23 November 1982)
- Palestra Italia 6–1 Santos (20 November 1921)
- Palmeiras 5–0 Santos (21 September 1997)
- Palmeiras 5–0 Santos (12 December 1965)
- Palestra Italia 5–0 Santos (8 July 1934)
- Santos 7–3 Palmeiras (3 October 1959)
- Santos 5–1 Palmeiras (3 September 2006)
- Palmeiras 5–1 Santos (17 November 1979)
- Palmeiras 5–1 Santos (29 November 1959)
- Palmeiras 5–1 Santos (22 January 1955)
- Palestra Italia 5–1 Santos (8 July 1917)
- Palmeiras 4–0 Santos (18 May 2019)
- Santos 0–4 Palmeiras (23 May 2004)
- Santos 4–0 Palmeiras (4 June 1997)
- Palmeiras 0–4 Santos (20 April 1974)
- Palmeiras 0–4 Santos (10 November 1964)
- Santos 4–0 Palmeiras (14 December 1952)
- Palestra Italia 4–0 Santos (18 April 1937)

==== Highest scoring ====
- Santos 7–6 Palmeiras (13 goals)
  (Torneio Rio-São Paulo, Pacaembu Stadium, 6 March 1958)

Source: Futpedia

=== Titles comparison ===
Competition	Palmeiras	Santos
Campeonato Brasileiro Série A	12	8
Copa do Brasil	4	1
Supercopa do Brasil	1	-
Copa dos Campeões	1	-
Copa Libertadores	3	3
Recopa Sudamericana	1	1
Copa Conmebol	-	1
Copa Mercosur	1	-
Intercontinental Champions' Supercup	-	1
Copa Rio	1	-
Intercontinental Cup	-	2
Total	24	17
Other Competitions	Palmeiras	Santos
Campeonato Paulista	27	22
Torneio Rio–São Paulo	5	5
Total General	56	44

Note: Despite some sources says that they are two distinct titles, the Intercontinental Champions' Supercup and the Supercopa Sul-Americana dos Campeões Intercontinentais, the latter was just a phase of the Intercontinental Champions' Supercup. CONMEBOL recognizes only one title, the Intercontinental Champions' Supercup.
