= Clássico Vovô =

Association football match

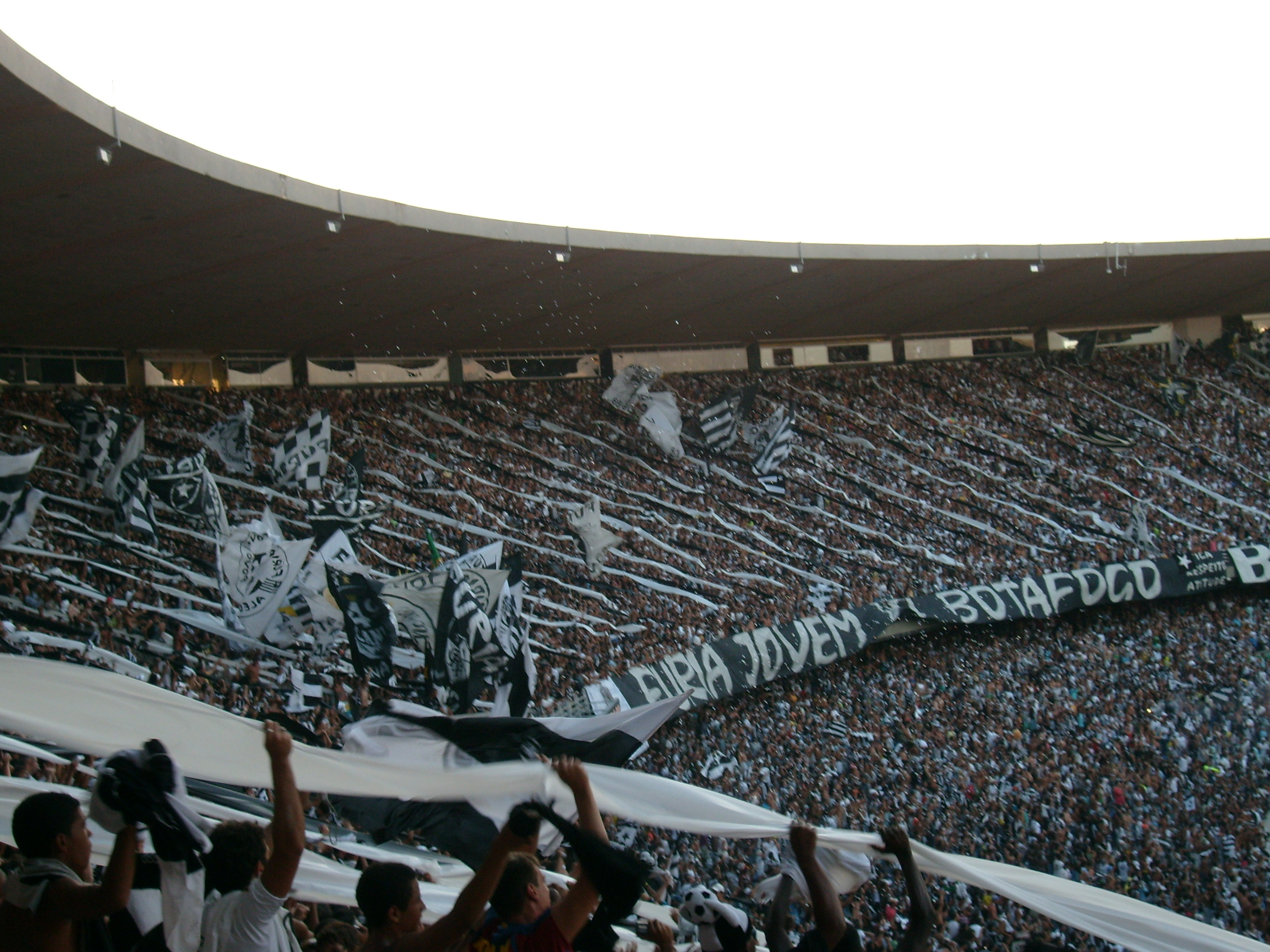
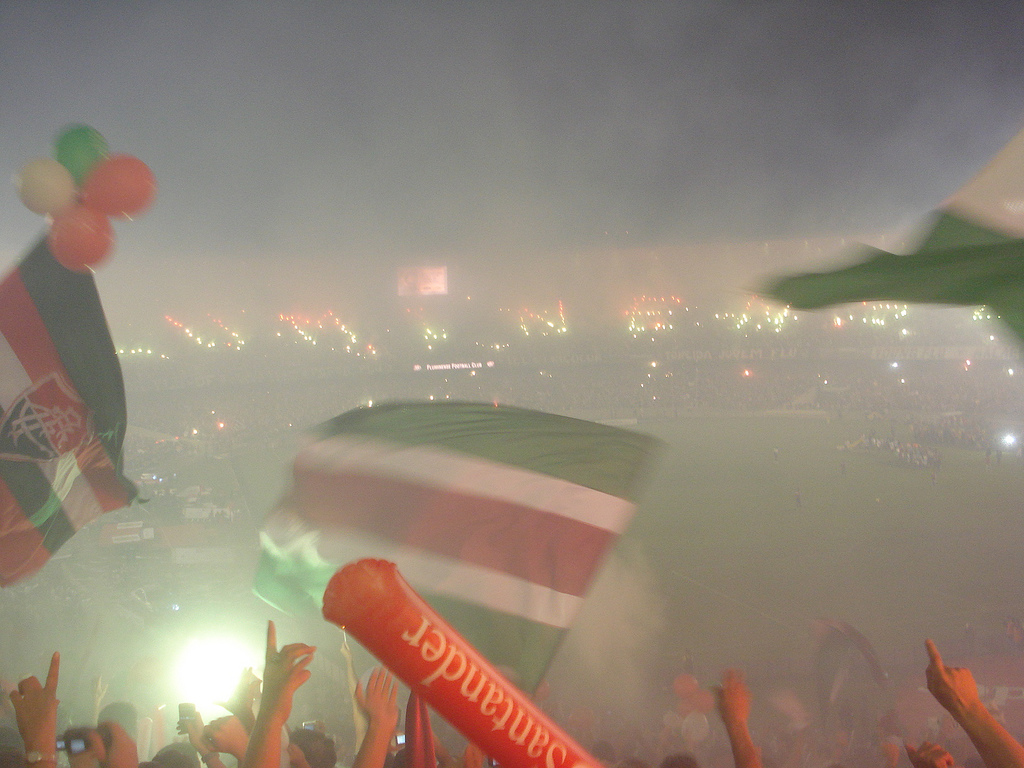
- Botafogo's and Fluminense's supporters
- Location: Rio de Janeiro, State of Rio de Janeiro, Brazil
- Teams: Botafogo; Fluminense
- First meeting: Fluminense 6–0 Botafogo; Friendly; October 22, 1905
- Latest meeting: Botafogo 1–1 Fluminense; Brazil Série A August 8, 2026
- Stadiums: Maracanã (Fluminense); Nilton Santos (Botafogo)

Statistics
- Total meetings: 398
- Top scorer: Heleno de Freitas (16); Waldo (16)
- All-time series: Botafogo: 133; Fluminense: 146; Draw: 119
- Largest victory: Fluminense 8–0 Botafogo; 1906 Campeonato Carioca; May 16, 1906

Botafogo	Fluminense

The Clássico Vovô (English: Grandpa Derby or Grandfather Derby) is the name given to Botafogo and Fluminense association football derby, both teams from the city of Rio de Janeiro, Brazil. It is the oldest rivalry among the major clubs in Brazil, and the third oldest in the Americas.

Botafogo and Fluminense are two of the four big clubs in Rio de Janeiro, alongside Flamengo and Vasco da Gama.

Matches usually take place at the Maracanã, with 78 thousand seats, and at the Nilton Santos Stadium, with 45 thousand seats, located in the Engenho de Dentro neighborhood.

The most contested tournament by teams is the Carioca Championship, with Botafogo winning the competition 21 times, and Fluminense 33. In the Brazilian Championship, Botafogo won three titles and Fluminense has won four, in addition to one Brazil Cup title.

At international level, Botafogo has won a CONMEBOL Cup and a Copa Libertadores, and Fluminense has won a Copa Libertadores and a Copa Rio, which it claims to be equivalent to a Club World Cup. Fluminense is the only football team in the world to hold the IOC Olympic Cup ("Coupe Olympique"), a non-competitive award for distinguished service in defending the ideals of the Olympic Movement and for considering the particular merits of institutions or associations and their services provided to sport, achieved in 1949.

== History ==
Oscar Cox, founder of Fluminense Football Club, was one of those largely responsible for bringing football to Rio de Janeiro, and in 1902 he created the city's first football club, in the Laranjeiras neighborhood. Two years later, students from the Alfredo Gomes school, in Botafogo, decided to create a football team in their own neighborhood, starting the Botafogo Football Club, which years later would join the neighborhood's rowing club, and form the Botafogo de Futebol e Regatas.

The name comes from being the two oldest practicing football clubs among the great clubs of Rio de Janeiro, and this is also the oldest derby in Brazil, as its first game was on October 22, 1905, a friendly that Fluminense won 6–0.

=== Foundation of the Carioca Championship ===
In 1906, the first Carioca Football Championship was formed, six clubs came together and created the LMF (Liga Metropolitana de Football, or Metropolitan Football League), including Botafogo and Fluminense. Fluminense team was made up of Brazilian and English players, and won this first championship, applying the biggest score of the fixture: 8–0 over Botafogo, made up of young students.

The 1907 Carioca Championship had several problems in its execution, starting with the withdrawal of Bangu and Rio Cricket from the competition. Botafogo and Fluminense finished tied in championship points, but Fluminense's goal average was higher, at the time it was decided by the Metropolitan League that Fluminense would win the title. Botafogo never recognized their rival's achievement, claiming that the tiebreaker criteria at the time were not clear, and a tiebreaker game should have been held. The legal dispute for the title lasted until 1996, when FFERJ declared both 1907 champions.

=== Knock-out matches ===
The only time this derby took place in a knock-out stage of any national or international level competition was in the second stage of the 2006 Copa Sudamericana. Fluminense won 4–2 on penalties after two 1–1 draws.

=== Direct decisions of the Carioca Championship ===
The Grandpa Derby directly decided the Campeonato Carioca nine times, with Flu becoming champion in 1908, 1909, 1946, 1959, 1971, 1975 and 2012, and Fogão in 1910 and 1957.

== Highest attendances ==
1. Botafogo–Fluminense 0–1, 160,000 (142,339 paid), June 27, 1971
2. Botafogo–Fluminense 1–0, 123,229 (99,991 paid), April 18, 1971
3. Botafogo–Fluminense 1–1, 114.575, September 4, 1983
4. Botafogo–Fluminense 1–2, 109,705, April 21, 1975
5. Botafogo–Fluminense 1–1, 105,299 (80,816 paid), March 23, 1969
6. Botafogo–Fluminense 1–0, 100,703, August 17, 1975
7. Botafogo–Fluminense 6–2, 99,465, December 22, 1957
8. Botafogo–Fluminense 1–1, 88,571, December 10, 1967
9. Botafogo–Fluminense 2–1, 88,081, July 13, 1958
10. Botafogo–Fluminense 3–1, 81,359, November 22, 1953

== Statistics ==
=== Head to head results ===
Club	P	W	D	Goals
Botafogo	398	133	119	534
Fluminense	398	146	119	582

As of August 8, 2026.

=== Statistics in the Campeonato Brasileiro Série A ===
- 68 Matches
- 24 Wins - Botafogo
- 23 Wins - Fluminense
- 21 Drawn
- Botafogo goals: 74
- Fluminense goals: 70
- Last match: Botafogo 1–1 Fluminense (August 8, 2026)

=== Titles comparison ===
Level	Competitions	Botafogo	Fluminense
International	Copa Libertadores	1	1
International	Recopa Sudamericana	-	1
International	CONMEBOL Cup	1	-
National	Brazilian Championship	3	4
National	Brazil Cup	-	1
Inter-state	Rio – São Paulo Tournament^{(1)}	4	2
Inter-state	Primeira Liga (Brazil)	-	1
State	Carioca Championship	21	33
Total general		30	44

^{(1)} In 1940 the competition was interrupted with Flamengo and Fluminense in the lead, without the CBD making the title official, however, the clubs and newspapers at the time considered the result definitive and declared the Flamengo and Fluminense as the legitimate champions of the competition. The club currently considers itself champion of the competition and includes this title among its achievements.
