= Provisional Measure 1394/2026 =

Brazilian gambling law

- Extra edition of the Diário Oficial da União, with the provisional measure

Brazilian federal government
- Citation: MP 1394/2026
- Territorial extent: Nationwide
- Enacted by: Brazilian federal government
- Enacted: 25 September 2026
- Status: In force

Provisional Measure 1394/2026, also known as "o MP do Fim das Bets" (lit. 'the PM of the End of the Bets') is a provisional measure of the Brazilian government outlawing online casinos and sports betting websites. The measure was enacted on 25 September 2026, and is set to expire 60 days after unless extended.

== The measure ==
The measure outlaws all online gambling sites (referred to in Brazil as "bets"), revokes any license previously granted by the Board of Prizes and Bets, and returns player money still in the platforms as per the schedule:

Online casino ban timeline
Date	Event
25 September	Provisional measure enacted, platforms no longer allowed to accept deposits, all advertisements cease
5 October	Last day for voluntary withdrawal of on-platform balances
6 October	Full shutdown of all platforms at midnight, any bet that expires after this point is automatically liquidated
7-8 October	Platforms will report to financial institutions any balances that were not withdrawn before the deadline
9-14 October	Platforms return all balances not withdrawn to players
After 14 October	If banks are unable to return the balances, the Caixa Economica Federal receives the funds so they can be paid out
24 November	Projected measure expiration unless extended or made permanent by the National Congress
23 January (2027)	Projected measure expiration if extended but not made permanent by the National Congress

=== Court challenges ===
On November 6th, 2026, the Federal Regional Tribunal for the Third Region issued an injunction allowing three online casino platforms to operate in spite of the ban. The federal government said it would appeal. the injunction. The day after, however, the injunction was overturned by the head of TRF-3, saying any such challenge is under the purview of the STF and thus cannot be overseen by the lower courts.

== Responses ==
=== Online gambling associations ===
The National Association of Games and Lotteries (ANJL) and the Brazilian Institute of Responsible Gambling (IBJR) publicly opposed the measure, stating that the ban would force players into clandestine online casinos with no guarantee of payout, and sought to dispute this in court.

The Supreme Federal Tribunal said that any challenge to the measure would have to be heard after the 2026 Brazilian general elections.

=== Football clubs ===
Several football clubs in Brazil have voiced their opposition to the ban, including Flamengo, Botafogo, Fluminense, Gremio, and Cruzeiro, as many football clubs were sponsored by online casino platforms, and the ban would result in loss of revenues from sponsorship contracts, potentially leading to many clubs going into insolvency (similar to the aftermath of the ITV Digital collapse in the United Kingdom). Many clubs have echoed the opinions of the ANJL and the IBJR, also referring to the ban as "the end of Brazilian Football".
