= Sebastián Gómez (Colombian footballer) =

Colombian footballer (born 1996)

Personal information
- Full name: Sebastián Gómez Londoño
- Date of birth: 3 June 1996 (age 30)
- Place of birth: Girardota, Colombia
- Height: 1.78 m (5 ft 10 in)
- Position: Midfielder

Team information
- Current team: Coritiba
- Number: 19

Youth career
- Atlético Nacional

Senior career*
Years	Team	Apps	(Gls)
2016–2023	Atlético Nacional	174	(13)
2016–2018	→ Leones (loan)	85	(13)
2023–	Coritiba	112	(5)

International career
2023	Colombia	2	(0)
- * Club domestic league appearances and goals as of 7 April 2026

Sebastián Gómez Londoño (born 3 June 1996) is a Colombian footballer who plays as a midfielder for Campeonato Brasileiro Série A club Coritiba and the Colombia national team.

== Club career ==
=== Atlético Nacional ===
Born in Girardota, Gómez was an Atlético Nacional youth graduate. In 2016, he was loaned to Categoría Primera B side Leones, helping in their promotion to the Categoría Primera A in 2017.

Gómez returned from loan to Atlético Nacional in November 2018. He became team captain in 2022.

=== Coritiba ===
On 1 August 2023, Gómez signed a three-and-a-half-year contract with Campeonato Brasileiro Série A side Coritiba.

== Career statistics ==
=== Club ===
As of 29 August 2025

Club	Season	League			Cup		Continental		State league		Other		Total	
Club	Season	Division	Apps	Goals	Apps	Goals	Apps	Goals	Apps	Goals	Apps	Goals	Apps	Goals
Leones	2016	Categoría Primera B	10	0	2	0	—		—		—		12	0
Leones	2017	Categoría Primera B	37	6	2	0	—		—		—		39	6
Leones	2018	Categoría Primera A	38	7	5	1	—		—		—		43	8
Leones	Total		85	13	9	1	—		—		—		94	14
Atlético Nacional	2019	Categoría Primera A	31	1	1	0	6 (Note: Four appearances and one goal in Copa Libertadores, two appearances in Copa Sudamericana)	1	—		—		38	2
Atlético Nacional	2020	Categoría Primera A	15	1	1	0	3 (Note: Appearance(s) in Copa Sudamericana)	0	—		—		19	1
Atlético Nacional	2021	Categoría Primera A	36	3	7	1	9 (Note: Appearance(s) in Copa Libertadores)	0	—		—		52	4
Atlético Nacional	2022	Categoría Primera A	37	3	2	0	2	0	—		—		41	3
Atlético Nacional	2023	Categoría Primera A	16	0	0	0	4	0	—		0	0	20	0
Atlético Nacional	Total		135	8	11	1	24	1	—		0	0	170	10
Coritiba	2023	Série A	20	2	—		—		—		—		20	2
Coritiba	2024	Série B	29	0	1	0	—		9 (Note: Appearance(s) in Campeonato Paranaense)	0	—		39	0
Coritiba	2025	Série B	22	2	1	0	—		8	0	—		31	2
Coritiba	Total		71	4	2	0	—		17	0	—		90	4
Career total			291	25	22	2	24	1	17	0	0	0	354	28

=== International ===
Appearances and goals by national team and year
National team	Year	Apps	Goals
Colombia	2023	2	0
Total		2	0

== Honours ==
Atlético Nacional

- Categoría Primera A: 2022 Apertura
- Copa Colombia: 2021
- Superliga Colombiana: 2023
