= Rodrigo Bellão =

Brazilian football coach (born 1987)

Personal information
- Full name: Rodrigo Dias Bellão
- Date of birth: 20 February 1987 (age 39)
- Place of birth: São Paulo, Brazil

Team information
- Current team: Botafogo U20 (head coach)

Managerial career
- Years: Team
- 2007–2013: Portuguesa (youth)
- 2014: Novorizontino U15
- 2015: Portuguesa (assistant)
- 2015: Mogi Mirim (assistant)
- 2016: Grêmio Osasco (assistant)
- 2016: Osasco FC (assistant)
- 2017: Atibaia (assistant)
- 2017: Red Bull Brasil U15 (assistant)
- 2018: Red Bull Brasil U20 (assistant)
- 2019: Corinthians U17 (assistant)
- 2020–2023: Athletico Paranaense U15
- 2023–2024: Athletico Paranaense U17
- 2024: Athletico Paranaense (assistant)
- 2025: Botafogo U17
- 2025–: Botafogo U20
- 2026: Botafogo (interim)
- 2026: Botafogo (interim)

Rodrigo Dias Bellão (born 20 February 1987) is a Brazilian football coach, currently the head coach of Botafogo's under-20 team.

== Career ==
Born in São Paulo, Bellão began his career with the youth sides of Portuguesa. He became the under-15 coach of Novorizontino in 2014, before returning to Lusa in the following year, as an assistant of the first team.

Bellão subsequently worked as an assistant at Mogi Mirim, Grêmio Osasco, Osasco FC and Atibaia, before joining the structure of Red Bull Brasil in 2017, as an assistant of the under-15s and later the under-20s.

In 2019, Bellão was an assistant of Corinthians' under-17 team, before becoming the under-15 coach of Athletico Paranaense in the following year. In October 2024, after a period in charge of the under-17s, he became the assistant of Lucho González in the main squad, but was sacked in December.

On 7 February 2025, Bellão joined Botafogo as an under-17 coach. He replaced Carlos Leiria in charge of the under-20s exactly one month later, After leading the club to the Campeonato Carioca Sub-20 title, he was named in charge of the team for the first two matches of the 2026 Campeonato Carioca, as the first team were still on pre-season.

Bellão's first senior match in charge occurred on 15 January 2026, a 2–0 away win over Portuguesa-RJ. Back to the under-20s after a 2–1 loss to Sampaio Corrêa-RJ, he was named interim head coach of the main squad on 22 March, after Martín Anselmi was sacked.

Back to his previous role after the appointment of Franclim Carvalho, Bellão was again named interim on 18 August 2026, after Carvalho was dismissed.

== Honours ==
Botafogo U20

- Campeonato Carioca Sub-20: 2025
