= Celso Rodrigues =

Brazilian football coach (born 1970)

Personal information
- Full name: Celso Luiz Ferreira Rodrigues
- Date of birth: 26 January 1970 (age 56)
- Place of birth: Cachoeira do Sul, Brazil

Managerial career
- Years: Team
- 2007–2015: Chapecoense (assistant)
- 2008: Chapecoense (interim)
- 2011: Chapecoense (interim)
- 2014: Chapecoense (interim)
- 2014: Chapecoense (interim)
- 2016: Concórdia
- 2017–2018: Operário-MS
- 2018: Juventus Jaraguá
- 2019: São Gabriel
- 2019: Operário-MS
- 2019–2020: Concórdia
- 2021: Camboriú
- 2022–2023: Operário-MS
- 2024–2026: Chapecoense (assistant)
- 2024: Chapecoense U20
- 2024: Chapecoense (interim)
- 2024: Chapecoense (interim)
- 2026: Chapecoense (interim)
- 2026: Chapecoense (interim)

Celso Luiz Ferreira Rodrigues (born 26 January 1970) is a Brazilian football coach.

== Career ==
Born in Cachoeira do Sul, Rio Grande do Sul, Rodrigues began his career with Chapecoense in 2007. In May 2014, he was named interim head coach of the first team, after Gilmar Dal Pozzo was sacked.

Back to an assistant role in September 2014 after the appointment of Jorginho, Rodrigues was again named interim on 17 November, now for the remainder of the season. After managing to avoid relegation, he returned to his previous role after the arrival of Vinícius Eutrópio.

In June 2016, Rodrigues was named head coach of Concórdia, before taking over Operário-MS in the following year. On 9 July 2018, he was named at the helm of Juventus Jaraguá.

On 11 December 2018, Rodrigues was confirmed as São Gabriel's head coach for the upcoming season. He returned to Operário the following 25 April, before returning to Concórdia on 15 July 2019.

Rodrigues led Concórdia to a promotion to the Campeonato Catarinense, but was sacked on 3 February 2020, after a poor start of the year. In 2021, he also led Camboriú to a promotion to the top tier of the state league.

On 8 March 2022, Rodrigues returned to Operário for a fourth spell. He won the year's Campeonato Sul-Mato-Grossense, but was dismissed on 27 June 2023, after a poor run of form in the 2023 Série D.

On 29 November 2023, Rodrigues returned to Chapecoense as their permanent assistant coach. In April and May 2026, he was again an interim head coach of the main squad, replacing Dal Pozzo and Fábio Matias, but was fired from the club on 9 June.

== Honours ==
Operário-MS

- Campeonato Sul-Mato-Grossense: 2018, 2022
