= Paulo Gomes (footballer, born 31 March 1975) =

Portuguese football coach and former player

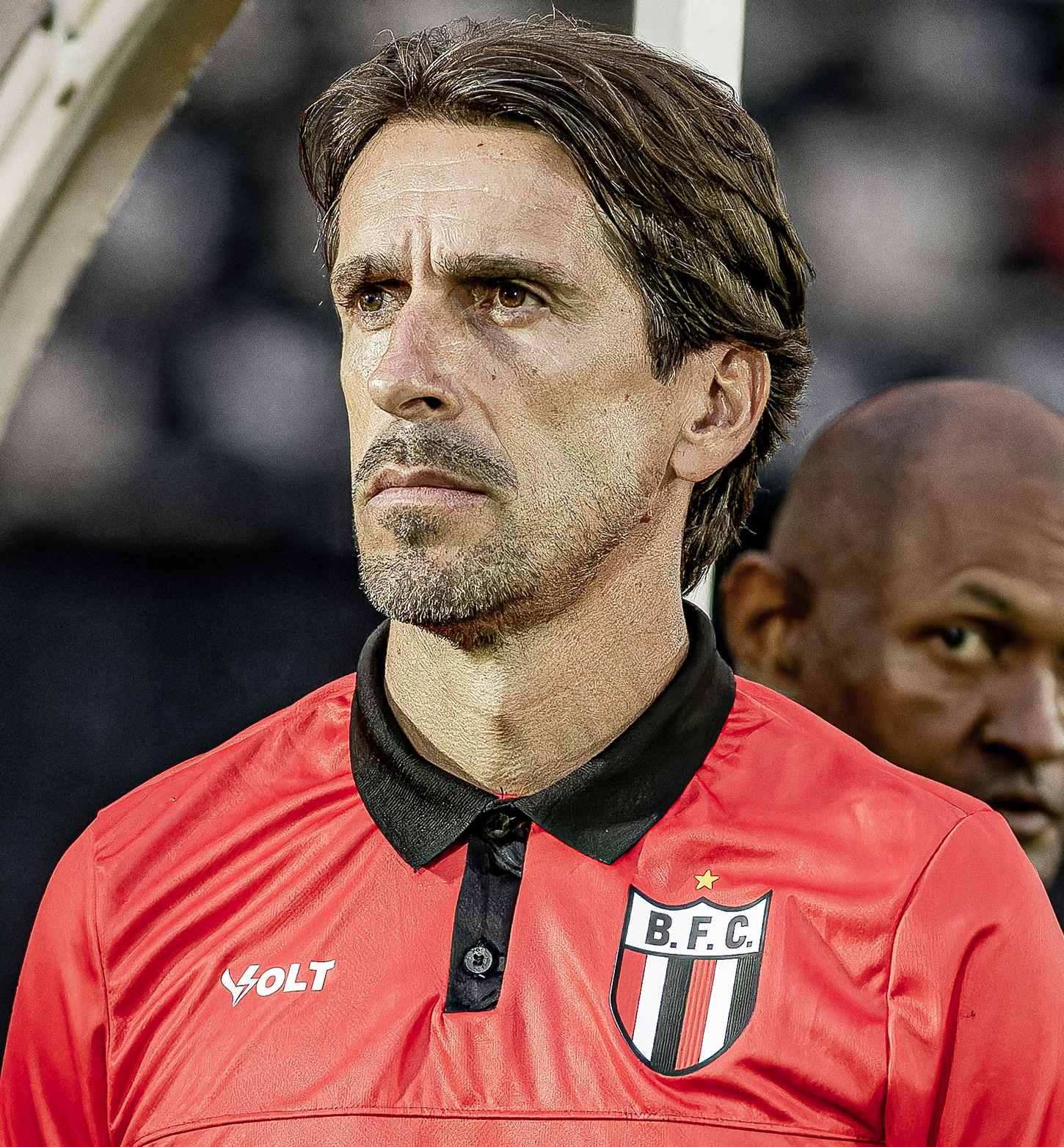
- Gomes in 2024

Personal information
- Full name: Carlos Paulo Cardoso Gomes Caçote
- Date of birth: 31 March 1975 (age 51)
- Place of birth: Mafamude, Portugal
- Height: 1.80 m (5 ft 11 in)
- Position: Midfielder

Youth career
- 1988–1992: Coimbrões
- 1992–1993: Espinho

Senior career*
Years	Team	Apps	(Gls)
1993–1994	Oliveira Douro		
1995–1996	Argus		
1996–1997	Oliveira Hospital		
1997–1998	Ovarense	27	(0)
1998–2000	Dragões Sandinenses		
2000–2001	Naval	2	(0)
2001–2002	Bragança	31	(0)
2002–2003	Lousada	35	(1)
2003–2004	Vizela	28	(1)
2004–2006	Lousada	35	(1)
2006–2007	Machico	18	(0)
2007–2008	Lousada	21	(1)
2008–2009	Hamm Benfica	6	(0)

Managerial career
- 2008–2009: Hamm Benfica (youth)
- 2009–2010: Mamer 32 (youth)
- 2009–2011: Muhlenbach Lusitanos
- 2012: Oberkorn
- 2012: Sandweiler
- 2012–2013: CS Pétange
- 2013–2014: Hamm Benfica
- 2016–2017: Avenir Beggen
- 2017–2018: Blue Boys Muhlenbach
- 2018–2019: Mondorf
- 2019–2020: Al Wehda (youth)
- 2020–2021: Najran SC
- 2021–2022: Al-Khaleej
- 2022–2023: Al-Jabalain
- 2024: Botafogo-SP
- * Club domestic league appearances and goals

Carlos Paulo Cardoso Gomes Caçote (born 31 March 1975) is a Portuguese football manager and former player who played as a midfielder.

== Playing career ==
Born in Mafamude, Vila Nova de Gaia, Gomes was a S.C. Coimbrões and S.C. Espinho youth graduate. After making his senior debut with C.F. Oliveira do Douro in 1993, he represented Terceira Divisão sides G.D. Argus and F.C. Oliveira do Hospital before joining Segunda Divisão side A.D. Ovarense in 1997.

In 2000, after two seasons at fourth tier side S.C. Dragões Sandinenses, Gomes signed for Segunda Liga side Associação Naval 1º de Maio. After only two appearances, he moved to GD Bragança in the third division in the following year.

Gomes continued to appear in the third level in the following years, playing for A.D. Lousada (three spells), F.C. Vizela and A.D. Machico. In 2008, he moved abroad for the first time in his career, joining Luxembourg National Division side FC RM Hamm Benfica; he retired with the latter in 2009, aged 34.

== Coaching career ==
Upon joining Hamm Benfica, Gomes worked as a manager of the club's under-11 squad. In 2009, he became manager of CS Muhlenbach Lusitanos, while also working with the under-18 side of FC Mamer 32.

Gomes led Muhlenbach to a promotion to the Division of Honour in May 2011, but left the club in October. In July 2012, after a brief period at CS Oberkorn, he was named in charge of fellow second division side US Sandweiler, but left on 30 October of that year to take over CS Pétange in the top tier.

Gomes remained as manager of Pétange despite their relegation, but left the club on 6 October 2013, amidst rumours to a possible switch to his former club Hamm Benfica; the move was confirmed the following day.

Sacked by Hamm Benfica on 28 May 2014, Gomes spent two years without a club before being appointed FC Avenir Beggen on 8 September 2016. He was dismissed from the latter on 21 March of the following year, with the club in the last position of the second division.

Gomes returned to Muhlenbach in on 30 May 2017, with the club being now named FC Blue Boys Muhlenbach. He was relieved from his duties the following February, and agreed to become the manager of US Mondorf-les-Bains on 6 May 2018.

On 25 April 2019, Gomes opted to leave Mondorf after being told he would not be the manager in the following season. On 22 September 2019, he joined Saudi club Al Wehda FC as a youth manager and coordinator.

On 18 October 2020, Gomes was named manager of Najran SC of the Saudi First Division League. After narrowly avoiding relegation, he moved to fellow league team Al-Khaleej FC on 24 November 2021, but was dismissed on 7 May 2022 with the club sitting at the top of the table.

On 10 November 2022, Gomes was announced as manager of Al-Jabalain FC, still in the Saudi second division. Sacked in February of the following year, he moved to Brazil on 29 November 2023, after being appointed head coach of Série B side Botafogo Futebol Clube (SP).

On 25 September 2024, Gomes was dismissed by Botafogo.
