= Benjamin Arhin =

Ghanaian footballer (born 2006)

Personal information
- Date of birth: 29 May 2006 (age 20)
- Place of birth: Senya Beraku, Ghana
- Height: 1.68 m (5 ft 6 in)
- Position: Midfielder

Team information
- Current team: Internacional
- Number: 33

Youth career
- 2021–2025: Dansoman Wise XI
- 2024–2025: → Internacional (loan)
- 2025–: Internacional

Senior career*
Years	Team	Apps	(Gls)
2026–	Internacional	4	(0)
- * Club domestic league appearances and goals as of 21:59, 17 May 2026 (UTC)

Benjamin Arhin (born 29 May 2006) is a Ghanaian professional footballer who plays as a midfielder for Brazilian club Internacional.

== Early life ==
Born in Senya Beraku but raised in Weija, Arhin began his career with Dansoman Wise XI in 2021. In September 2024, he was he impressed the scouts of Internacional after playing against them in a local tournament, and joined the club on loan until the following January afterwards.

== Career ==
In February 2025, Inter signed a permanent contract with Arhin until January 2028, paying € 200,000 for 50% of his economic rights. A regular member of the under-20 squad, he made his first team debut on 11 January 2026, starting in a 2–1 Campeonato Gaúcho away win over Novo Hamburgo.

== Career statistics ==
As of 17 May 2026

Appearances and goals by club, season and competition
Club	Season	League			State League		National Cup		Continental		Other		Total	
Club	Season	Division	Apps	Goals	Apps	Goals	Apps	Goals	Apps	Goals	Apps	Goals	Apps	Goals
Internacional	2025	Série A	0	0	—		—		—		4 (Note: Appearance(s) in Copa FGF)	0	4	0
Internacional	2026	Série A	1	0	3	0	0	0	—		1 (Note: Appearance(s) in Recopa Gaúcha)	0	5	0
Career total			1	0	3	0	0	0	0	0	5	0	9	0

== Honours ==
Internacional

- Recopa Gaúcha: 2026
