= Zé Delivery =

Brazilian food delivery platform

- Genre: Drinks delivered by app
- Founded: 2015; 11 years ago
- Area served: Latin America
- Key people: Rodolfo Chung, (CEO)
- Owner: AmBev
- Website: www.ze.delivery

Zé Delivery is a startup developed by Brazilian drinks company AmBev which offers an app for delivering drinks. The app is available for Android and iOS.

Created in 2016 by AmBev's ZX Ventures hub, the service has an international presence in Argentina, Paraguay, Bolivia, Panama and the Dominican Republic. It is also present in more than 300 Brazilian cities.

Because it has an extensive category of alcoholic beverages, the service is only used by people over 18. It also offers soft drinks, juices, energy drinks and other non-alcoholic beverages.

== See also ==
- AmBev
