= Bruno Lazaroni =

Brazilian footballer and manager (born 1980)

Personal information
- Full name: Bruno Amorim Lazaroni
- Date of birth: 13 September 1980 (age 46)
- Place of birth: Rio de Janeiro, Brazil
- Height: 1.81 m (5 ft 11 in)
- Position: Defensive midfielder

Team information
- Current team: Vasco da Gama (assistant)

Youth career
- Flamengo

Senior career*
Years	Team	Apps	(Gls)
1999–2000	Flamengo	0	(0)
2000–2002	→ Bangu (loan)	46	(4)
2002–2003	Vasco da Gama	34	(0)
2003–2004	St. Gallen	10	(0)
2004	Bangu	2	(0)
2004–2005	Atlético Sorocaba		
2005	União Barbarense		
2006	America-RJ		
2006	Portuguesa	3	(2)
2007	America-RJ		
2007–2010	Naval	55	(1)
2010–2012	Al-Ittifaq	42	(3)

Managerial career
- 2014–2015: Botafogo U13
- 2018–2020: Botafogo (assistant)
- 2018: Botafogo (interim)
- 2019: Botafogo (interim)
- 2020: Botafogo
- 2020–2021: Botafogo (assistant)
- 2021: Athletico Paranaense U23
- 2021–2022: Athletico Paranaense (assistant)
- 2022: Cuiabá (assistant)
- 2023: Coritiba (assistant)
- 2023–2024: Cuiabá (assistant)
- 2024: Corinthians (assistant)
- 2025–: Vasco da Gama (assistant)
- 2026: Vasco da Gama (interim)
- * Club domestic league appearances and goals

Bruno Amorim Lazaroni (born 13 September 1980) is a Brazilian retired football coach and former player who played as a defensive midfielder. He is the current assistant coach of Vasco da Gama.

== Playing career ==
Lazaroni was born in Rio de Janeiro, and represented Flamengo as a youth. A forward, he left the club in 2000 after making no appearances, and subsequently joined Bangu, where he was converted into a defensive midfielder.

In 2002, after impressing for Bangu, Lazaroni joined Vasco da Gama, but featured sparingly for the club. In 2004, after one year at the Swiss club St. Gallen (where he also appeared rarely), he returned to Bangu.

Lazaroni subsequently spent the remainder of his career in the lower leagues, representing Atlético Sorocaba, União Barbarense, America-RJ (two spells) and Portuguesa, aside from five seasons abroad, three with Naval in Portugal and two with Al-Ittifaq in Saudi Arabia. He retired with the latter in 2012, aged 32.

== Coaching career ==
After retiring, Lazaroni returned to his hometown and was named in charge of Botafogo's youth setup in 2014, initially assigned to the under-13 squad. He then left the club in the following year to join his father at Qatar SC, but returned to Bota to take over the technical coordinator of the club's youth sides.

In February 2017, Lazaroni was named general manager of Botafogo's youth setup, but was appointed permanent assistant coach in January 2018. He was subsequently an interim head coach of the main squad on two occasions, after the dismissals of Marcos Paquetá and Eduardo Barroca, respectively.

On 1 October 2020, Lazaroni was appointed head coach of Botafogo's main squad after the resignation of Paulo Autuori. However, after only 28 days, he was relieved from his duties.

On 13 March 2021, Lazaroni moved to Athletico Paranaense to become the head coach of the under-23 team in the 2021 Campeonato Paranaense. He later became an assistant of António Oliveira in the main squad, and subsequently followed Oliveira to Cuiabá, Coritiba and Corinthians, under the same role.

On 12 January 2025, Lazaroni returned to Vasco, now as an assistant coach of the first team. On 22 February of the following year, he was named interim head coach after Fernando Diniz was sacked.

== Personal life ==
Lazaroni is the son of Sebastião Lazaroni, who is also a manager.

== Honours ==
Vasco da Gama

- Campeonato Carioca: 2003
