= Fábio Matias =

Brazilian football manager (born 1979)

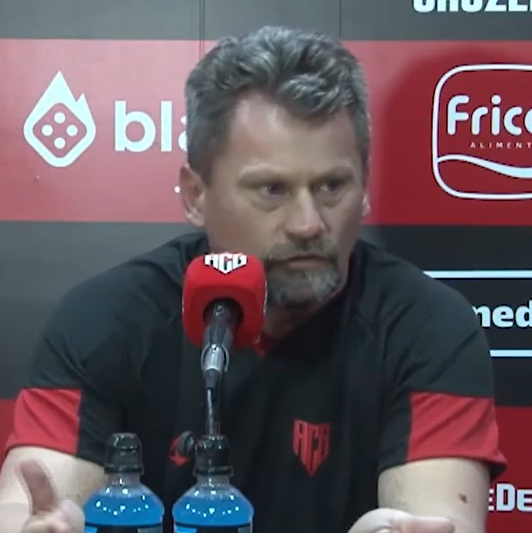
- Matias in 2025

Personal information
- Full name: Fábio Henrique Matias
- Date of birth: 25 September 1979 (age 47)
- Place of birth: Santa Bárbara d'Oeste, Brazil
- Position: Goalkeeper

Team information
- Current team: CRB (head coach)

Youth career
- Years: Team
- União Barbarense

Managerial career
- 2008–2010: Guarani U17
- 2011: União Barbarense U20
- 2011–2014: Desportivo Brasil U17
- 2014–2016: Grêmio U17
- 2016–2017: Internacional U17
- 2017–2018: Internacional U20
- 2018–2019: Figueirense U20
- 2019–2021: Internacional U20
- 2021: Internacional (interim)
- 2021–2022: Flamengo U20
- 2022–2023: Red Bull Bragantino U23
- 2023: Red Bull Bragantino II
- 2024: Botafogo (assistant)
- 2024: Botafogo (interim)
- 2024: Coritiba
- 2024–2025: Juventude
- 2025: Atlético Goianiense
- 2026: Portuguesa
- 2026: Chapecoense
- 2026–: CRB

Fábio Henrique Matias (born 25 September 1979) is a Brazilian football coach, currently the head coach of CRB.

== Career ==
Matias was born in Santa Bárbara d'Oeste, São Paulo, and was a goalkeeper at União Barbarense's youth setup. He never played as a senior, and subsequently started his coaching career in 2000, as a goalkeeping and fitness coach for Rio Branco-SP's under-15 side.

Matias' first coaching experience occurred with his Guarani, being in charge of the under-17 squad. In 2011, he joined Desportivo Brasil to become their under-17 coach, and won the 2012 U17 Campeonato Paulista with the side.

Matias moved to Grêmio in 2014, again as an under-17 coach. On 20 February 2016, he signed for cross-town rivals Internacional under the same role, and was appointed in charge of the latter's under-20s the following year.

Matias left Inter on 23 February 2018, and took over Figuerense's under-20s roughly one month later. On 25 March 2019, he moved back to Internacional, again as coach of the under-20s. With the latter, he won the 2020 Copa São Paulo de Futebol Júnior.

On 26 February 2021, after the departure of Abel Braga, Matias was named interim head coach of the first team for the first rounds of the 2021 Campeonato Gaúcho. His first match in charge occurred on 1 March, a 1–0 win over Juventude.

Matias subsequently returned to his previous role with the under-20s after Miguel Ángel Ramírez took over the main squad. On 21 July 2021, he was named head coach of Flamengo's under-20 side.

Matias left Fla on 6 May 2022, and joined Red Bull Bragantino to work with the reserve and under-23 team. On 8 January 2024, he moved to Botafogo to become the permanent assistant coach of their main squad.

On 22 February 2024, Matias was named interim head coach of Botafogo, after Tiago Nunes was dismissed. After just one defeat in ten matches, he returned to his previous role after the appointment of Artur Jorge.

On 12 June 2024, Matias was named head coach of Série B side Coritiba. On 23 July, after a 4–0 loss to Santos, he was sacked.

On 27 October 2024, Matias took over Juventude in the top tier, replacing Jair Ventura. Despite avoiding relegation, he left the club by mutual consent on 11 May 2025, and took over Atlético Goianiense in the second division five days later.

On 18 July 2025, Matias was sacked by Atlético. On 30 September, he agreed to become the head coach of Portuguesa ahead of the upcoming season.

Matias led Lusa to the quarterfinals of the 2026 Campeonato Paulista, but left on 5 April of that year, amidst negotiations with another club. Hours later, he was announced at Chapecoense in the top tier.

Matias was sacked by Chape on 25 May 2026, after seven winless league matches. On 5 July, he replaced Eduardo Barroca at the helm of CRB in the second division.

== Managerial statistics ==
As of 26 May 2026.

Managerial record by team and tenure
Team	Nat	From	To	Record								Ref
Team	Nat	From	To	G	W	D	L	GF	GA	GD	Win %	Ref
Figueirense (Note: Coached the club in the 2018 Copa Santa Catarina as they fielded an under-23 squad in the entire competition)	(Brazil)	16 September 2018	11 November 2018	12	6	2	4	22	19	+3	50.00	
Internacional (interim)	(Brazil)	26 February 2021	2 March 2021	3	1	1	1	4	4	+0	33.33	
Flamengo (interim) (Note: Interim as the club fielded an under-20 squad in two 2022 Campeonato Carioca matches)	(Brazil)	26 January 2022	29 January 2022	2	1	1	0	2	1	+1	50.00	
Red Bull Bragantino II	(Brazil)	6 May 2022	8 January 2024	25	6	7	12	37	43	−6	24.00	
Botafogo (interim)	(Brazil)	22 February 2024	3 April 2024	10	8	1	1	26	9	+17	80.00	
Coritiba	(Brazil)	12 June 2024	23 July 2024	8	1	3	4	5	11	−6	12.50	
Juventude	(Brazil)	27 October 2024	11 May 2025	26	12	4	10	34	41	−7	46.15	
Atlético Goianiense	(Brazil)	16 May 2025	19 July 2025	9	3	2	4	9	9	+0	33.33	
Portuguesa	(Brazil)	30 September 2025	5 April 2026	13	6	3	4	21	14	+7	46.15	
Chapecoense	(Brazil)	5 April 2026	25 May 2026	9	2	1	6	11	16	−5	22.22	
CRB	(Brazil)	5 July 2026	present	0	0	0	0	0	0	+0	—	
Total				108	44	24	40	160	151	+9	40.74	—

== Honours ==
Internacional U20

- Copa São Paulo de Futebol Júnior: 2020

Botafogo

- Taça Rio: 2024
