= Leandro Zago =

Brazilian football manager

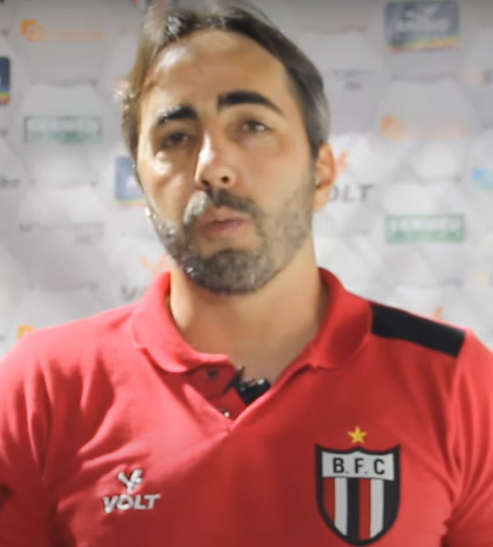
- Zago as head coach of Botafogo-SP in 2022

Personal information
- Full name: Leandro Calixto Zago
- Date of birth: 27 May 1981 (age 45)
- Place of birth: Campinas, Brazil

Managerial career
- Years: Team
- 2010–2011: Desportivo Brasil U17 (assistant)
- 2011: PAEC (assistant)
- 2012–2013: Corinthians U15
- 2013–2014: Guarani (assistant)
- 2014–2015: Ferroviária U20
- 2015–2016: Palmeiras U20 (assistant)
- 2016–2018: Ponte Preta U20
- 2018–2019: Atlético Mineiro U17
- 2019–2021: Atlético Mineiro U20
- 2021: Joinville
- 2022: Botafogo-SP
- 2023: Fortaleza U20
- 2023: Portuguesa
- 2024–2025: Santos U20
- 2024: Santos (interim)
- 2025–2026: Atlético Mineiro U20
- 2026: Betim

Leandro Calixto Zago (born 27 May 1981) is a Brazilian football coach.

== Career ==
Born in Campinas, São Paulo, Zago began his career as a fitness coach at hometown side Campinas FC in 2008, before moving to Desportivo Brasil in 2010 as an assistant coach. In March of the following year, he moved to Pão de Açúcar EC, also as an assistant.

Zago joined Corinthians in October 2011, after being named manager of the under-15 squad. He left in May 2013 to join Guarani, as an assistant of the main squad.

In July 2014, Zago was appointed manager of Ferroviária's under-20 team. He moved to Palmeiras in September of the following year, in the same category but as an assistant of João Burse, and left in February 2016 to take over Ponte Preta, also in the under-20s.

On 27 February 2018, Zago was named manager of Atlético Mineiro's under-17 squad, and was appointed in charge of the club's under-20s on 28 June of the following year. During the 2020 season, he was in charge of the first team for three Série A matches as Jorge Sampaoli and his staff were on quarantine after a COVID-19 outbreak in the squad.

Zago left Galo on 18 March 2021, and was named manager of Série D side Joinville on 26 April. He left the club on 25 October with only two losses, and was named at the helm of Botafogo-SP on 19 November.

On 23 May 2022, Zago was sacked by Botafogo, after three defeats his last four matches. On 1 December, he was announced by Fortaleza as the head coach of their under-20 team, before returning to first team duties the following 26 April, after being named at the helm of Portuguesa.

On 19 September 2023, Zago was sacked by Lusa, after the club's elimination in the Copa Paulista. On 29 September 2024, after more than a year without a club, he joined Santos as head coach of the under-20 team.

On 18 November 2024, Zago became the interim head coach of Peixe, after Fábio Carille left. Back to his previous role as an under-20 coach, he resigned from the club on 31 March 2025, to return to Atlético Mineiro under the same role.

On 21 January 2026, Zago was dismissed from Galo. Exactly one month later, he was named head coach of Betim, being sacked on 4 July, hours before a match against CSA.

== Coaching statistics ==
As of 25 November 2024

Coaching record by team and tenure
Team	Nat	From	To	Record								Ref
Team	Nat	From	To	G	W	D	L	GF	GA	GD	Win %	Ref
Atlético Mineiro (interim) (Note: Interim as head coach Jorge Sampaoli and his staff were sidelined due to COVID-19)	(Brazil)	18 November 2020	25 November 2020	3	1	1	1	4	5	−1	33.33	
Joinville	(Brazil)	26 April 2021	25 October 2021	21	9	10	2	24	13	+11	42.86	
Botafogo-SP	(Brazil)	19 November 2021	23 May 2022	22	9	4	9	22	25	−3	40.91	
Portuguesa	(Brazil)	26 April 2023	19 September 2023	12	7	3	2	16	5	+11	58.33	
Santos (interim)	(Brazil)	18 November 2024	24 November 2024	1	0	0	1	1	2	−1	0.00	
Betim	(Brazil)	21 February 2026	4 July 2026	12	5	3	4	14	10	+4	41.67	
Total				71	31	21	19	81	60	+21	43.66	—
