= Artur Jorge (footballer, born 1972) =

Portuguese football manager and former player (born 1972)

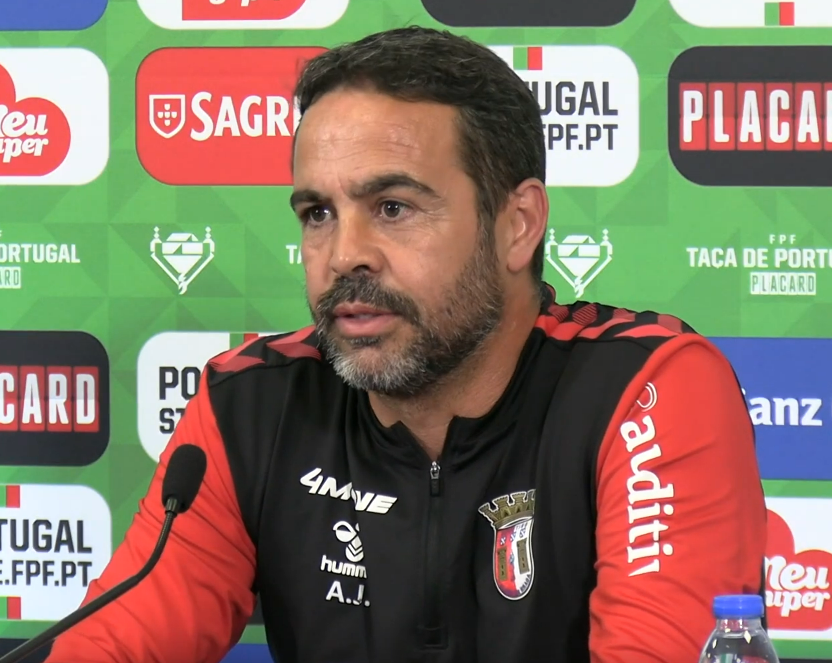
- Artur Jorge with Braga in 2023

Personal information
- Full name: Artur Jorge Torres Gomes Araújo Amorim
- Date of birth: 1 January 1972 (age 54)
- Place of birth: Braga, Portugal
- Height: 1.83 m (6 ft 0 in)
- Position: Centre-back

Team information
- Current team: Cruzeiro (head coach)

Youth career
- 1985–1986: Ginásio Sé
- 1986–1990: Braga

Senior career*
Years	Team	Apps	(Gls)
1990–2002	Braga B	33	(5)
1992–2004	Braga	240	(10)
2004–2005	Penafiel	1	(0)
Total		274	(15)

International career
1993–1994	Portugal U21	6	(0)

Managerial career
- 2009–2010: Famalicão
- 2010–2012: Braga (youth)
- 2012: Braga B
- 2013: Tirsense
- 2017: Limianos
- 2017–2020: Braga (youth)
- 2020: Braga
- 2020: Braga (under-23)
- 2021–2022: Braga B
- 2022–2024: Braga
- 2024: Botafogo
- 2025–2026: Al-Rayyan
- 2026–: Cruzeiro
- * Club domestic league appearances and goals

Artur Jorge Torres Gomes Araújo Amorim (born 1 January 1972), known as Artur Jorge, is a Portuguese football manager and former player who played as a central defender. He is the current head coach of Campeonato Brasileiro Série A club Cruzeiro.

As a player and manager, he was most associated with Braga, where he spent all but one season of his playing career and coached several of its teams, including two spells with the main squad and winning the Taça da Liga in 2023–24. He also led Botafogo to their first-ever Copa Libertadores title in 2024, also winning that year's Série A before departing for Al-Rayyan.

== Playing career ==
Born in Braga, Artur Jorge played mostly for hometown club S.C. Braga. He made his Primeira Liga debut on 29 November 1992, coming on as a late substitute in a 2–1 away win against C.F. Os Belenenses. On 24 May 1998, he captained the side in the Taça de Portugal final, a 3–1 loss to FC Porto, in which he was booked after ten minutes for a foul on Ljubinko Drulović.

After 12 years at the Estádio 1º de Maio, the 33-year-old Artur Jorge retired at the end of the 2004–05 season with newly promoted F.C. Penafiel, contributing only 90 minutes to the team's midtable finish.

== Coaching career ==
=== Early career ===
Artur Jorge began working as a manager with F.C. Famalicão, helping them to the third place in the play-offs of the fourth division, narrowly missing out on promotion. He subsequently worked with Braga's under-19s, who finished second and third in the junior championship during his tenure.

In early 2012, it was announced that Braga's reserves would be revived and compete in the Segunda Liga as of the upcoming campaign. Shortly after, Artur Jorge was named head coach, achieving a 2–2 draw at S.L. Benfica B on his debut on 11 August. He quit on 16 October, having taken five points and no wins from nine games.

In July 2013, Artur Jorge was appointed at F.C. Tirsense.

=== Braga ===
Artur Jorge returned to Braga's youths in 2017, and became first-team boss on 1 July 2020 when Custódio resigned with five games left of the season. He won 4–0 at home to C.D. Aves on his debut three days later, and secured third place with a 2–1 victory on the final day over champions Porto; he was named in charge of the under-23 side shortly after.

Artur Jorge returned to Braga B on 16 June 2021. On 18 May 2022, he was reappointed at the helm of the main squad following the departure of Carlos Carvalhal. His first season back at the Estádio Municipal de Braga was the best in the club's history for points (78), wins (25) and goals (75), as they beat Sporting CP to third place and a return to the UEFA Champions League for the first time in 11 years; his team lost the national cup final on 4 June to Porto, whose manager Sérgio Conceição was an opponent in the fixture of the same outcome 25 years earlier.

On 20 September 2023, Artur Jorge made his Champions League debut in a 2–1 group stage defeat at home to SSC Napoli. In the following fixture he managed his first victory in the competition, beating 1. FC Union Berlin 3–2 away.

Artur Jorge extended his contract with Braga on 10 November 2023, until 2025. The following 27 January, his team won the Taça da Liga by defeating G.D. Estoril Praia in the final on penalties after a 1–1 draw in Leiria.

=== Botafogo ===
On 3 April 2024, Artur Jorge became head coach of Campeonato Brasileiro Série A side Botafogo FR, who paid €2 million to acquire his services; he was officially presented three days later. His debut on 14 April was a 3–2 loss away to Cruzeiro EC, whose winning goal came in added time.

On 30 November 2024, Artur Jorge led his team to win in the Copa Libertadores, defeating fellow Brazilians Clube Atlético Mineiro 3–1 in spite of playing more than 90 minutes with one player less. The following month, he gave them their third national title in history, totalling six more points than the previous back-to-back champions SE Palmeiras.

On 3 January 2025, Botafogo announced Artur Jorge's departure by mutual consent.

=== Al-Rayyan ===
On 4 January 2025, a day after leaving Botafogo, Artur Jorge was appointed at Qatar Stars League club Al-Rayyan SC. He achieved a fifth place in his debut campaign.

=== Cruzeiro ===
Artur Jorge returned to the Brazilian top division in March 2026, on a contract at Cruzeiro running until December 2027.

== Personal life ==
Artur Jorge's son, known by the same name, was also a footballer and a defender. He also played for Braga.

== Managerial statistics ==
As of match played 18 November 2026

Managerial record by team and tenure
Team	Nat	From	To	Record								Ref.
Team	Nat	From	To	G	W	D	L	GF	GA	GD	Win %	Ref.
Famalicão	(Portugal)	15 December 2009	31 May 2010	22	10	7	5	29	20	+9	45.45	
Braga B	(Portugal)	17 May 2012	16 October 2012	9	0	5	4	6	11	−5	0.00	
Tirsense	(Portugal)	6 July 2013	4 November 2013	10	3	4	3	12	12	+0	30.00	
Limianos	(Portugal)	24 January 2017	16 May 2017	15	3	5	7	13	20	−7	20.00	
Braga	(Portugal)	1 July 2020	27 July 2020	5	3	1	1	12	4	+8	60.00	
Braga B	(Portugal)	16 June 2021	18 May 2022	28	11	10	7	45	39	+6	39.29	
Braga	(Portugal)	18 May 2022	3 April 2024	99	62	14	23	202	122	+80	62.63	
Botafogo	(Brazil)	3 April 2024	3 January 2025	55	31	15	9	83	46	+37	56.36	
Al-Rayyan	(Qatar)	4 January 2025	22 March 2026	56	30	11	15	129	84	+45	53.57	
Cruzeiro	(Brazil)	22 March 2026	present	41	24	8	9	66	44	+22	58.54	
Total				340	177	80	83	597	402	+195	52.06	—

== Honours ==
=== Manager ===
Braga

- Taça da Liga: 2023–24

Botafogo

- Campeonato Brasileiro Série A: 2024
- Copa Libertadores: 2024

Individual

- Primeira Liga Manager of the Month: April 2023
- Campeonato Brasileiro Série A Coach of the Year: 2024
- Troféu Mesa Redonda Team of the Year: 2024
