= 2024 Sport Club Corinthians Paulista season =

Corinthians 2024 football season

Corinthians
2024 season
- President: Augusto Melo
- Manager: Mano Menezes (until 5 February); Thiago Kosloski (caretaker, 5 February – 8 February); António Oliveira (9 February – 2 July); Raphael Laruccia (caretaker, 3 July – 10 July); Ramón Díaz (from 10 July)
- Stadium: Neo Química Arena
- Série A: 7th
- Copa do Brasil: Semi-finals
- Campeonato Paulista: Group stage
- Copa Sudamericana: Semi-finals
- Top goalscorer: League: Yuri Alberto (15); All: Yuri Alberto (31)
- Highest home attendance: 46,977 vs Flamengo (20 October 2024)
- Lowest home attendance: 32,351 vs Nacional (9 April 2024)
- Average home league attendance: 43,906
Home colors	Away colors	Third colors

The 2024 season was the 115th season in the history of Sport Club Corinthians Paulista. The season covered the period from January 2024 to December 2024.

It was the first year of Augusto Melo's three-year term, which began following his election in November 2023.

== Background ==
=== Kits ===
- Home (2 May 2024 onward): White shirt with fading black sleeves and bottom, black shorts and white socks;
- Away (2 May 2024 onward): Black shirt, Black shorts and black socks;
- Third (27 August 2024 onward): black and white shirt, black and white shorts and black and white socks;
- Fourth: Beige shirt, black shorts and black socks.

=== Previous kits ===
- Home (Until 1 May 2024): White shirt, black shorts and white socks with a yellow horizontal stripe;
- Away (Until 1 May 2024): Black shirt with white stripes, white shorts and black socks;
- Third (Until 26 August 2024): Yellow shirt, yellow shorts and yellow socks;

=== Sponsorship ===
On 7 January, Corinthians announced a three-year R$370,000,000 deal with VaideBet (an online gambling company) as the club's new main sponsor. It was the biggest sponsorship contract for a football club in Brazil's history. In turn, the company rescinded the contract on 7 June using an anti-corruption clause, as there were concerns regarding an investigation due to a possible fake company that intermediated the deal between both parties.

On 25 July, during the halftime of a home match against Grêmio, Esportes da Sorte (another online gambling company) was announced as the new main sponsor. It will be a three-year R$309,000,000 deal.

== Squad ==
As of 13 September 2024

Note: Flags indicate national team as defined under FIFA eligibility rules; some limited exceptions apply. Players may hold more than one non-FIFA nationality.

No.	Pos.	Nation	Player
1	GK	BRA	Hugo Souza (on loan from Flamengo)
2	DF	BRA	Matheuzinho
3	DF	ECU	Félix Torres
4	DF	BRA	Caetano
5	DF	BRA	André Ramalho
6	DF	ECU	Diego Palacios
7	MF	BRA	Maycon (on loan from Shakhtar Donetsk)
8	MF	BRA	Charles
9	FW	BRA	Yuri Alberto
10	MF	ARG	Rodrigo Garro
11	FW	PAR	Ángel Romero
13	DF	BRA	Gustavo Henrique
14	MF	BRA	Raniele
16	FW	BRA	Pedro Henrique
17	FW	BRA	Giovane
19	MF	PER	André Carrillo
20	FW	BRA	Pedro Raul

No.	Pos.	Nation	Player
21	DF	BRA	Matheus Bidu
22	FW	ESP	Héctor Hernández
23	DF	BRA	Fagner (captain)
25	DF	BRA	Cacá (on loan from Tokushima Vortis)
27	MF	BRA	Breno Bidon
30	MF	BRA	Matheus Araújo
31	FW	BRA	Kayke
32	GK	BRA	Matheus Donelli
33	MF	BRA	Ruan Oliveira (on loan from Metropolitano)
35	DF	BRA	Léo Mana
37	MF	BRA	Ryan
43	FW	BRA	Talles Magno (on loan from New York City FC)
46	DF	BRA	Hugo
70	MF	VEN	José Andrés Martínez
77	MF	BRA	Igor Coronado
80	MF	BRA	Alex Santana
94	FW	NED	Memphis Depay

=== Squad number changes ===
Notes:

- Squad numbers last updated on 12 September 2024.
- Player^{*} – Player who joined Corinthians permanently or on loan during the season.
- Player^{†} – Player who departed Corinthians permanently or on loan during the season.

Player	Pos.	Prev. No.	New No.	Previous player to wear number	Notes
(Brazil) Caetano	DF	14	4	(Brazil) Gil (2023)	Gil departed the club (January 2024)
(Brazil) Arthur Sousa	FW	—	29	(Brazil) Roni (2023)	Roni departed the club (January 2024)
(Brazil) Léo Mana	DF	13	35	(Brazil) Breno Bidon (2023)	Bidon was re-allocated number 27 (January 2024)
(Brazil) Raniele^{*}	MF	—	14	(Brazil) Caetano (2023)	Caetano took the number 4 shirt (January 2024)
(Ecuador) Diego Palacios^{*}	DF	—	6	(Brazil) Fábio Santos (2023)	Santos departed the club (December 2023)
(Argentina) Rodrigo Garro^{*}	MF	—	16	(Brazil) Vitor Meer (2023)	Meer was re-allocated number 28 (January 2024)
(Brazil) Hugo^{*}	DF	—	46	(Brazil) Renato (2023)	Renato returned to the youth squad (January 2024)
(Ecuador) Félix Torres^{*}	DF	—	25	(Uruguay) Bruno Méndez (2023)	Méndez departed the club (December 2023)
(Brazil) Gustavo Henrique^{*}	DF	—	13	(Brazil) Léo Mana (2023)	Mana was re-allocated number 35 (January 2024)
(Ecuador) Félix Torres^{*}	DF	25	3	(Brazil) Lucas Veríssimo (2024)	Veríssimo departed the club (January 2024)
(Brazil) Paulinho^{†}	MF	15	18	(Ukraine) Júnior Moraes (2023)	Moraes departed the club (June 2023)
(Brazil) Pedro Raul^{*}	FW	—	20	(Brazil) Giuliano (2023)	Giuliano departed the club (December 2023)
(Brazil) Matheuzinho^{*}	DF	—	2	(Portugal) Rafael Ramos (2023)	Ramos departed the club (February 2024)
(Brazil) Igor Coronado^{*}	MF	—	77	(Brazil) Chrystian Barletta (2023)	Barletta departed the club (July 2023)
(Brazil) Pedro Henrique^{*}	FW	—	15	(Brazil) Paulinho (2024)	Paulinho took the number 18 shirt (January 2024)
(Brazil) João Pedro^{†}	DF	—	47	(Brazil) Guilherme Pellegrin (2024)	Pellegrin returned to the youth squad (February 2024)
(Brazil) Cacá^{*}	DF	—	25	(Ecuador) Félix Torres (2024)	Torres took the number 3 shirt (January 2024)
(Argentina) Rodrigo Garro^{*}	MF	16	10	(Paraguay) Matías Rojas (2024)	Rojas departed the club (March 2024)
(Brazil) Pedro Henrique^{*}	FW	15	16	(Argentina) Rodrigo Garro (2024)	Garro took the number 10 shirt (March 2024)
(Brazil) Paulinho^{†}	MF	18	8	(Brazil) Renato Augusto (2023)	Augusto departed the club (December 2023)
(Brazil) Hugo Souza^{*}	GK	—	1	(Brazil) Ivan (2022)	Ivan departed the club (June 2022)
(Brazil) Alex Santana^{*}	MF	—	80	—	—
(Brazil) André Ramalho^{*}	DF	—	5	(Argentina) Fausto Vera (2024)	Vera departed the club (July 2024)
(Brazil) Charles^{*}	MF	—	8	(Brazil) Paulinho (2024)	Paulinho departed the club (July 2024)
(Brazil) Talles Magno^{*}	FW	—	43	(Brazil) Gui Negão (2024)	Gui Negão returned to the youth squad (February 2024)
(Venezuela) José Andrés Martínez^{*}	MF	—	70	—	—
(Spain) Héctor Hernández^{*}	FW	—	22	(Brazil) Carlos Miguel (2024)	Carlos Miguel departed the club (July 2024)
(Netherlands) Memphis Depay^{*}	FW	—	94	—	—
(Peru) André Carrillo^{*}	MF	—	19	(Brazil) Gustavo Silva (2024)	Silva departed the club (July 2024)

== Managerial changes ==
On 5 February, Mano Menezes was fired after recurring poor performances and a four-match losing streak at the Campeonato Paulista. The club's assistant coach Thiago Kosloski was announced as the caretaker for their next match against rivals Santos.

On 9 February, Portuguese manager António Oliveira was announced as Corinthians' new head coach after the club paid a R$1,040,000 transfer fee to hire him from Cuiabá and signed a one-year contract. The club also decided to rescind Kosloski's contract. Oliveira was fired on 2 July after a 2–0 away defeat against rivals Palmeiras and just one win in 13 games at the Série A (making it 34 days without a victory in any competition and 64 days at the league). Current U-20 coach Raphael Laruccia was named the caretaker on the following day.

On 10 July, Argentine manager Ramón Díaz was announced as the club's new manager with a contract until the end of 2025. He made his debut in a home match against Criciúma on 16 July.

Manager	Signed from	Date of signing	Date of departure	Signed with	Source
(Brazil) Mano Menezes	Free agent	28 September 2023	5 February 2024	—	
(Brazil) Thiago Kosloski	Assistant coach (caretaker)	5 February 2024	8 February 2024	—	
(Portugal) António Oliveira	(Brazil) Cuiabá	9 February 2024	2 July 2024	—	
(Brazil) Raphael Laruccia	Corinthians U-20 head coach (caretaker)	3 July 2024	10 July 2024	Returned to the U-20 team	
(Argentina) Ramón Díaz	Free agent	10 July 2024	—	—	

== Transfers ==
=== Transfers in ===
#	Position:	Player	Transferred from	Fee	Date	Team	Source
14	MF	(Brazil) Raniele	(Brazil) Cuiabá	€2,500,000 (~R$13,300,000) (Note: Should Raniele play at least 60% of the club's games during the season, Corinthians will be obliged to pay €500,000 (~R$2,695,000) to acquire another 10% of his economic rights.)	2 January 2024	First team	
6	DF	(Ecuador) Diego Palacios	(United States) Los Angeles FC	Free transfer (End of contract)	2 January 2024	First team	
16	MF	(Argentina) Rodrigo Garro	(Argentina) Talleres	Undisclosed (US$6,000,000 ~R$29,500,000) (Note: Both clubs also agreed to have two future friendlies in Argentina and Brazil with each home team receiving their match's revenue.)	2 January 2024	First team	
46	DF	(Brazil) Hugo	(Brazil) Goiás	Free transfer (End of contract)	11 January 2024	First team	
25	DF	(Ecuador) Félix Torres	(Mexico) Santos Laguna	US$6,500,000 (~R$31,500,000)	14 January 2024	First team	
13	DF	(Brazil) Gustavo Henrique	(Spain) Valladolid	Free transfer (Rescinded contract)	15 January 2024	First team	
20	FW	(Brazil) Pedro Raul	(Mexico) Toluca	US$5,000,000 (~R$25,000,000)	2 February 2024	First team	
2	DF	(Brazil) Matheuzinho	(Brazil) Flamengo	€4,000,000 (~R$21,300,000)	16 February 2024	First team	
77	MF	(Brazil) Igor Coronado	(Saudi Arabia) Al-Ittihad	Free transfer (Rescinded contract)	16 February 2024	First team	
15	FW	(Brazil) Pedro Henrique	(Brazil) Internacional	Undisclosed (US$500,000 ~R$2,900,000)	16 February 2024	First team	
	FW	(Uruguay) Franco Delgado	(Uruguay) Danubio	Undisclosed	14 March 2024	Academy	
	FW	(Brazil) Léo Natel	(Australia) Melbourne City	End of loan (Note: Léo Natel was on loan since 15 September 2023 until 30 June 2024.)	1 July 2024	First team	
80	MF	(Brazil) Alex Santana	(Brazil) Athletico Paranaense	€2,000,000 (~R$12,000,000)	15 July 2024	First team	
5	DF	(Brazil) André Ramalho	(Netherlands) PSV	Free transfer (End of contract)	16 July 2024	First team	
8	MF	(Brazil) Charles	(Denmark) Midtjylland	€1,600,000 (~R$9,700,000)	24 July 2024	First team	
70	MF	(Venezuela) José Andrés Martínez	(United States) Philadelphia Union	US$1,600,000 (~R$9,000,000)	26 August 2024	First team	
22	FW	(Spain) Héctor Hernández	Free agent	Free transfer	27 August 2024	First team	
94	FW	(Netherlands) Memphis Depay	Free agent	Free transfer	9 September 2024	First team	
19	MF	(Peru) André Carrillo	(Saudi Arabia) Al-Qadsiah	Free transfer (Rescinded contract)	10 September 2024	First team	

=== Loans in ===
#	Position	Player	Loaned from	Date	Loan expires	Team	Source
7	MF	(Brazil) Maycon	(Ukraine) Shakhtar Donetsk	15 January 2024 (Note: Maycon was on loan since March 2022 with the deal being renewed each season ever since.)	31 December 2024	First team	
33	MF	(Brazil) Ruan Oliveira	(Brazil) Metropolitano	17 January 2024 (Note: Ruan Oliveira was already on loan since 2019 until 31 December 2023. The deal was renewed several times due to injuries, including the latest one.)	31 December 2024	First team	
44	MF	(Brazil) Gabriel Moscardo	(France) Paris Saint-Germain	25 January 2024 (Note: Gabriel Moscardo was signed by Paris Saint-Germain and immediately loaned until June 2024.)	30 June 2024	First team	
25	DF	(Brazil) Cacá	(Japan) Tokushima Vortis	7 March 2024	31 December 2024 (Note: Loan with an obligation to buy of US$2,000,000 (~R$11,000,000) after playing 2200 minutes.)	First team	
1	GK	(Brazil) Hugo Souza	(Brazil) Flamengo	2 July 2024	31 December 2024	First team	
43	FW	(Brazil) Talles Magno	(United States) New York City FC	9 August 2024	31 July 2025	First team	

=== Transfers out ===
#	Position	Player	Transferred to	Fee	Date	Team	Source
6	DF	(Brazil) Fábio Santos	Retired	End of contract	2 December 2023	First team	
4	DF	(Brazil) Gil	(Brazil) Santos	Free transfer (End of contract)	14 December 2023	First team	
20	MF	(Brazil) Giuliano	(Brazil) Santos	Free transfer (End of contract)	14 December 2023	First team	
8	MF	(Brazil) Renato Augusto	(Brazil) Fluminense	Free transfer (End of contract)	14 December 2023	First team	
41	FW	(Brazil) Felipe Augusto	(Belgium) Cercle Brugge	€3,000,000 (~R$16,036,000)	19 December 2023	First team	
25	DF	(Uruguay) Bruno Méndez	(Spain) Granada	Free transfer (End of contract)	26 December 2023	First team	
24	MF	(Colombia) Víctor Cantillo	(Colombia) Junior	Free transfer (End of contract)	29 December 2023	First team	
27	FW	(Brazil) Pedro	(Russia) Zenit Saint Petersburg	€9,000,000 (~R$46,700,000)	1 January 2024 (Note: On 29 June 2023, Zenit Saint Petersburg announced that they had reached an agreement with Corinthians to sign Pedro when he turns 18 years old in February 2024. However, he is expected to join them in January for the club's mid season preparation.)	First team	
	DF	(Brazil) Léo Santos	(Brazil) Guarani	Free transfer (End of contract)	1 January 2024	First team	
	FW	(Brazil) Jonathan Cafú	(Brazil) Cuiabá	Free transfer (End of contract)	1 January 2024	First team	
	GK	(Brazil) Ivan	(Brazil) Internacional	Undisclosed (Note: The deal includes an undisclosed fee and 20% of Carlos Miguel's economic rights.)	7 January 2024	First team	
	MF	(Brazil) Luis Mandaca	(Brazil) Juventude	Free transfer (Rescinded contract)	12 January 2024	First team	
3	DF	(Brazil) Lucas Veríssimo	(Qatar) Al-Duhail	Loan cancelled (Note: Lucas Veríssimo was loaned from Benfica since July 2023 until June 2024 and had an agreement for a definitive signing, but the loan was cancelled as the player was sold from Benfica to Al-Duhail.)	20 January 2024	First team	
44	MF	(Brazil) Gabriel Moscardo	(France) Paris Saint-Germain	€20,000,000 (~R$107,600,000) (Note: Deal includes another €2,000,000 (~R$10,760,000) in bonuses.)	25 January 2024	First team	
	FW	(Brazil) Rodrigo Varanda	(Brazil) América Mineiro	Free transfer (End of contract)	1 February 2024	First team	
2	DF	(Portugal) Rafael Ramos	(Brazil) Ceará	Free transfer (Rescinded contract)	16 February 2024	First team	
	MF	(Paraguay) Matías Rojas	(United States) Inter Miami	Free transfer (Rescinded contract)	23 April 2024	First team	
12	GK	(Brazil) Cássio	(Brazil) Cruzeiro	Free transfer (Rescinded contract)	17 May 2024	First team	
8	MF	(Brazil) Paulinho	Free agent	End of contract	29 May 2024	First team	
	FW	(Brazil) Higor Farias	(Brazil) Água Santa	Free transfer (Rescinded contract)	4 June 2024	Academy	
28	DF	(Brazil) Vitor Meer	(Cyprus) APOEL	Free transfer (Rescinded contract)	12 June 2024	Academy	
	DF	(Brazil) Kaio Henrique	(Portugal) Porto B	Free transfer (Rescinded contract)	17 June 2024	Academy	
34	DF	(Brazil) Raul Gustavo	(Hungary) Ferencváros	Undisclosed (US$200,000 ~R$1,100,000)	19 June 2024	First team	
22	GK	(Brazil) Carlos Miguel	(England) Nottingham Forest	€4,000,000 (~R$23,440,000)	9 July 2024	First team	
5	MF	(Argentina) Fausto Vera	(Brazil) Atlético Mineiro	US$4,500,000 (~R$24,700,000)	16 July 2024	First team	
19	FW	(Brazil) Gustavo Silva	Free agent	Rescinded contract	17 July 2024	First team	
	DF	(Brazil) João Gabriel Maklouf	(Italy) Como	Undisclosed	29 July 2024	Academy	
	FW	(Brazil) Laércio	(Albania) KF Bylis	Undisclosed	30 July 2024	Academy	
	FW	(Brazil) Léo Natel	(Cyprus) Pafos	Undisclosed	31 July 2024	First team	
	MF	(Brazil) Pedrinho	(Morocco) Wydad Casablanca	Undisclosed	21 August 2024	Academy	
29	FW	(Brazil) Arthur Sousa	(Brazil) Red Bull Bragantino	Free transfer (Rescinded contract)	27 August 2024	First team	
36	FW	(Brazil) Wesley	(Saudi Arabia) Al Nassr	US$20,000,000 (~R$110,000,000) (Note: Deal includes another US$5,000,000 (~R$27,000,000) in additional bonuses.)	30 August 2024	First team	

=== Loans out ===
#	Position	Player	Loaned to	Date	Loan expires	Team	Source
29	MF	(Brazil) Roni	(Brazil) Atlético Goianiense	22 January 2024	31 December 2024	First team	
50	GK	(Brazil) Matheus Roger	(Brazil) Avaí	22 July 2024	31 January 2025	Academy	
47	DF	(Brazil) João Pedro	(Brazil) Ceará	9 August 2024	31 December 2024	First team	
26	MF	(Brazil) Guilherme Biro	(United Arab Emirates) Sharjah	9 September 2024	30 June 2025	First team	

== Statistics ==
=== Squad statistics ===
No.	Pos.	Name	Campeonato Brasileiro		Copa do Brasil		Campeonato Paulista		Copa Sudamericana		Total		Discipline	
No.	Pos.	Name	Apps	Goals	Apps	Goals	Apps	Goals	Apps	Goals	Apps	Goals	Yellow card	Red card
1	GK	(Brazil) Hugo Souza	22	0	6	0	0	0	6	0	34	0	4	0
2	DF	(Brazil) Matheuzinho	23 (8)	1	4 (2)	0	1 (2)	0	3 (7)	1	31 (19)	2	9	0
3	DF	(Ecuador) Félix Torres	19 (3)	0	8 (1)	0	11	0	10	0	48 (4)	0	5	0
4	DF	(Brazil) Caetano	4 (1)	0	0 (1)	0	9	0	0	0	13 (2)	0	4	2
5	DF	(Brazil) André Ramalho	17 (1)	0	4 (2)	1	0	0	4 (1)	0	25 (4)	1	6	1
6	DF	(Ecuador) Diego Palacios	0	0	0	0	1	0	0	0	1	0	0	0
7	MF	(Brazil) Maycon	0 (2)	0	1	0	10	2	0	0	11 (2)	2	3	0
8	MF	(Brazil) Charles	5 (8)	1	5	0	0	0	5 (1)	0	15 (9)	1	6	0
9	FW	(Brazil) Yuri Alberto	25 (4)	15	6 (1)	2	9 (2)	5	9 (1)	9	49 (8)	31	8	1
10	MF	(Argentina) Rodrigo Garro	35 (1)	10	7 (2)	0	6	1	8 (3)	2	56 (6)	13	15	1
11	FW	(Paraguay) Ángel Romero	16 (12)	5	9 (1)	3	10 (1)	3	5 (5)	3	41 (18)	14	12	0
13	DF	(Brazil) Gustavo Henrique	17 (1)	1	6 (1)	1	4	0	4 (2)	0	31 (4)	2	13	1
14	MF	(Brazil) Raniele	28 (5)	0	7	0	11	0	6	0	52 (5)	0	13	1
16	FW	(Brazil) Pedro Henrique	4 (7)	1	3 (2)	0	1 (3)	0	1 (5)	1	9 (17)	2	5	0
17	FW	(Brazil) Giovane	1 (10)	1	0 (6)	0	0 (1)	0	2 (1)	1	3 (18)	2	2	0
19	MF	(Peru) André Carrillo	8 (5)	0	0 (2)	0	0	0	3 (1)	0	11 (8)	0	3	0
20	FW	(Brazil) Pedro Raul	4 (15)	0	1 (2)	1	3 (1)	1	2 (4)	1	10 (22)	3	5	0
21	DF	(Brazil) Matheus Bidu	16 (7)	2	4 (1)	0	0	0	4 (1)	0	24 (9)	2	4	0
22	FW	(Spain) Héctor Hernández	1 (2)	0	1 (1)	0	0	0	0	0	2 (3)	0	0	0
23	DF	(Brazil) Fagner	12 (2)	0	5 (3)	0	10	0	9	0	36 (5)	0	11	1
25	DF	(Brazil) Cacá	26	4	3 (1)	2	0	0	7 (2)	0	36 (3)	6	8	1
27	MF	(Brazil) Breno Bidon	22 (7)	0	3 (2)	1	0 (1)	0	6 (3)	0	31 (13)	1	8	0
30	MF	(Brazil) Matheus Araújo	0 (4)	0	0 (1)	0	3 (3)	0	0 (1)	0	3 (9)	0	0	0
31	FW	(Brazil) Kayke	0 (2)	0	0	0	0 (1)	0	0	0	0 (3)	0	0	0
32	GK	(Brazil) Matheus Donelli	7	0	0	0	0	0	0	0	7	0	1	0
33	MF	(Brazil) Ruan Oliveira	0	0	0	0	0	0	0	0	0	0	0	0
35	DF	(Brazil) Léo Mana	3 (2)	0	0 (1)	0	1 (2)	0	0	0	4 (5)	0	2	0
37	MF	(Brazil) Ryan	6 (5)	0	2 (1)	0	1 (3)	0	2 (2)	0	11 (11)	0	5	1
40	GK	(Brazil) Felipe Longo	0	0	0	0	0	0	0	0	0	0	0	0
41	DF	(Brazil) Renato	0	0	0	0	0	0	0	0	0	0	0	0
42	FW	(Brazil) Luiz Fernando	0	0	0	0	0	0	0	0	0	0	0	0
43	FW	(Brazil) Talles Magno	6 (8)	2	2	0	0	0	2 (1)	1	10 (9)	3	2	0
46	DF	(Brazil) Hugo	22 (3)	0	6	0	8 (4)	0	8	0	44 (7)	0	6	0
47	DF	(Brazil) Guilherme Pellegrin	0	0	0	0	0	0	0	0	0	0	0	0
48	DF	(Brazil) Rafael Venâncio	0	0	0	0	0	0	0	0	0	0	0	0
49	MF	(Brazil) Yago	0	0	0	0	0 (2)	0	0	0	0 (2)	0	0	0
49	FW	(Brazil) Gui Negão	0	0	0	0	0	0	0	0	0	0	0	0
70	MF	(Venezuela) José Andrés Martínez	8 (3)	0	2 (1)	0	0	0	3 (1)	0	13 (5)	0	6	1
77	MF	(Brazil) Igor Coronado	11 (19)	1	3 (3)	0	0 (1)	0	4 (4)	3	18 (27)	4	6	0
80	MF	(Brazil) Alex Santana	6 (6)	0	1	0	0	0	0 (2)	0	7 (8)	0	2	0
94	FW	(Netherlands) Memphis Depay	9 (2)	7	0	0	0	0	2 (1)	0	11 (3)	7	4	0
Players transferred out during the season
5	MF	(Argentina) Fausto Vera	2 (4)	0	0 (3)	0	3 (7)	0	2 (2)	1	7 (16)	1	0	0
8	MF	(Brazil) Paulinho	1 (5)	0	1 (1)	0	0	0	1 (3)	0	3 (9)	0	1	0
10	MF	(Paraguay) Matías Rojas	0	0	0 (1)	0	4 (5)	0	0	0	4 (6)	0	1	0
12	GK	(Brazil) Cássio	3	0	1	0	10	0	3	0	17	0	1	1
19	FW	(Brazil) Gustavo Silva	4 (6)	1	1 (2)	0	2 (9)	0	1 (2)	0	8 (19)	1	1	0
22	GK	(Brazil) Carlos Miguel	6	0	3	0	2	0	3	0	14	0	3	0
26	MF	(Brazil) Guilherme Biro	0 (3)	0	0 (3)	0	1 (2)	0	1	0	2 (8)	0	0	0
28	DF	(Brazil) Vitor Meer	0	0	0	0	0	0	0	0	0	0	0	0
29	FW	(Brazil) Arthur Sousa	0 (1)	0	0	0	0 (3)	1	0	0	0 (4)	1	0	0
34	DF	(Brazil) Raul Gustavo	1	0	0	0	3 (1)	0	1	0	5 (1)	0	3	1
36	FW	(Brazil) Wesley	17 (6)	2	4 (1)	1	7 (4)	1	5 (2)	1	33 (13)	5	4	0
44	MF	(Brazil) Gabriel Moscardo	1 (1)	0	0	0	0	0	0	0	1 (1)	0	0	0
47	DF	(Brazil) João Pedro	0 (1)	0	0	0	1	0	0	0	1 (1)	0	0	0
50	GK	(Brazil) Matheus Roger	0	0	0	0	0	0	0	0	0	0	0	0

=== Goals ===
As of 8 December 2024

Rank	Player	BR	CdB	CPa	CS	Total
1	(Brazil) Yuri Alberto	15	2	5	9	31
2	(Paraguay) Ángel Romero	5	3	3	3	14
3	(Argentina) Rodrigo Garro	10	0	1	2	13
4	(Netherlands) Memphis Depay	7	0	0	0	7
5	(Brazil) Cacá	4	2	0	0	6
6	(Brazil) Wesley	2	1	1	1	5
7	(Brazil) Igor Coronado	1	0	0	3	4
8	(Brazil) Pedro Raul	0	1	1	1	3
8	(Brazil) Talles Magno	2	0	0	1	3
10	(Brazil) Giovane	1	0	0	1	2
10	(Brazil) Gustavo Henrique	1	1	0	0	2
10	(Brazil) Matheus Bidu	2	0	0	0	2
10	(Brazil) Matheuzinho	1	0	0	1	2
10	(Brazil) Maycon	0	0	2	0	2
10	(Brazil) Pedro Henrique	1	0	0	1	2
16	(Brazil) André Ramalho	0	1	0	0	1
16	(Brazil) Arthur Sousa	0	0	1	0	1
16	(Brazil) Breno Bidon	0	1	0	0	1
16	(Brazil) Charles	1	0	0	0	1
16	(Brazil) Gustavo Silva	1	0	0	0	1
16	(Argentina) Fausto Vera	0	0	0	1	1
Own goals		0	1	0	1	2
Total		54	13	14	25	106

=== Disciplinary record ===
N	P	Nat.	Name	BR			CdB			CPa			CS			Total			Notes
N	P	Nat.	Name	Yellow card	Second yellow card	Red card	Yellow card	Second yellow card	Red card	Yellow card	Second yellow card	Red card	Yellow card	Second yellow card	Red card	Yellow card	Second yellow card	Red card	Notes
4	DF	(Brazil)	Caetano	1	1					2		1				3	1	1	
14	MF	(Brazil)	Raniele	8			3		1	1			1			13		1	
25	DF	(Brazil)	Cacá	4		1	3						1			8		1	
9	FW	(Brazil)	Yuri Alberto	6		1				1			1			8		1	
5	DF	(Brazil)	André Ramalho	4		1	2									6		1	
70	MF	(Venezuela)	José Andrés Martínez	5		1	1									6		1	
34	DF	(Brazil)	Raul Gustavo							3					1	3		1	
12	GK	(Brazil)	Cássio							1		1				1		1	
10	MF	(Argentina)	Rodrigo Garro	8			3	1					4			15	1		
13	DF	(Brazil)	Gustavo Henrique	7	1		2			3						12	1		
23	DF	(Brazil)	Fagner	3	1		2			4			2			11	1		
37	MF	(Brazil)	Ryan	2						2	1					4	1		
11	FW	(Paraguay)	Ángel Romero	6			2			4						12			
2	DF	(Brazil)	Matheuzinho	4			4						1			9			
27	MF	(Brazil)	Breno Bidon	5			1			1			1			8			
8	MF	(Brazil)	Charles	4			1						1			6			
46	DF	(Brazil)	Hugo	3			2						1			6			
77	MF	(Brazil)	Igor Coronado	6												6			
16	FW	(Brazil)	Pedro Henrique	2			2			1						5			
20	FW	(Brazil)	Pedro Raul	2						2			1			5			
3	DF	(Ecuador)	Félix Torres	3			1						1			5			
94	FW	(Netherlands)	Memphis Depay	3									1			4			
1	GK	(Brazil)	Hugo Souza	3			1									4			
21	DF	(Brazil)	Matheus Bidu	3									1			4			
36	FW	(Brazil)	Wesley	2						1			1			4			
19	MF	(Peru)	André Carrillo	3												3			
22	GK	(Brazil)	Carlos Miguel	3												3			
7	MF	(Brazil)	Maycon	1						2						3			
80	MF	(Brazil)	Alex Santana	2												2			
17	FW	(Brazil)	Giovane	1									1			2			
35	DF	(Brazil)	Léo Mana	1						1						2			
43	FW	(Brazil)	Talles Magno	2												2			
19	FW	(Brazil)	Gustavo Silva	1												1			
32	GK	(Brazil)	Matheus Donelli				1									1			
8	MF	(Brazil)	Paulinho										1			1			
10	MF	(Paraguay)	Matías Rojas							1						1			

Ordered by (red card) , (second yellow card) and (yellow card)
(yellow card) = Number of bookings; (second yellow card) = Number of sending offs after a second yellow card; (red card) = Number of sending offs by a direct red card.

== Overview ==
Competition	First match	Last match	Starting round	Final position	Record							
Competition	First match	Last match	Starting round	Final position	Pld	W	D	L	GF	GA	GD	Win %
Série A	14 April 2024	8 December 2024	Matchday 1	7th place	38	15	11	12	54	45	+9	39.47
Copa do Brasil	22 February 2024	20 October 2024	First round	Semi-finals	10	5	3	2	13	6	+7	50.00
Campeonato Paulista	21 January 2024	10 March 2024	Matchday 1	Group stage	12	4	2	6	14	14	+0	33.33
Copa Sudamericana	2 April 2024	31 October 2024	Group stage	Semi-finals	12	7	2	3	25	8	+17	58.33
Total					72	31	18	23	106	73	+33	43.06

Source: Competitions

== Friendlies ==
27 March 2024 Friendly	Londrina	0–3	Corinthians	Cascavel
20:00 UTC−3		Report	Romero 81', 86'; Giovane 90+5'	Stadium: Estádio Olímpico Regional (Note: Londrina played the friendly as the home team at Estádio Olímpico Regional, Cascavel instead of their regular stadium Estádio do Café, Londrina due to the pitch being renovated.); Attendance: Undisclosed; Referee: André Ricardo Martins

== Campeonato Paulista ==
For the 2024 Campeonato Paulista, the 16 teams are divided in four groups of 4 teams (A, B, C, D). They will face all teams, except those that are in their own group, with the top two teams from each group qualifying for the quarterfinals. The two overall worst teams will be relegated.

=== First stage ===
Pos	Team	Pld	W	D	L	GF	GA	GD	Pts	Qualification
1	Red Bull Bragantino	12	6	3	3	13	9	+4	21	Knockout stage
2	Inter de Limeira	12	5	2	5	17	15	+2	17	Knockout stage
3	Corinthians	12	4	2	6	14	14	0	14	
4	Mirassol	12	3	5	4	17	17	0	14	

Source: Soccerway

21 January 2024 1	Corinthians	1–0	Guarani	São Paulo
18:00 UTC−3	Romero 28'	Report		Stadium: Neo Química Arena; Attendance: 42,608; Referee: Thiago Luis Scarascati

24 January 2024 2	Ituano	1–0	Corinthians	Itu
19:30 UTC−3	Léo Duarte 87'	Report		Stadium: Estádio Novelli Júnior; Attendance: 14,718; Referee: Matheus Delgado Candançan

27 January 2024 3	São Bernardo	1–0	Corinthians	São Bernardo do Campo
20:00 UTC−3	Silvinho 26'	Report		Stadium: Estádio 1º de Maio; Attendance: 6,783; Referee: João Vitor Gobi

30 January 2024 4	Corinthians	1–2	São Paulo	São Paulo
19:30 UTC−3	Arthur Sousa 90+1'	Report	Calleri 20'; Luiz Gustavo 51'	Stadium: Neo Química Arena; Attendance: 43,481; Referee: Vinicius Gonçalves Dias Araújo

4 February 2024 5	Corinthians	1–3	Novorizontino	São Paulo
11:00 UTC−3	Yuri Alberto 72'	Report	Jenison 45+2', 48', 58'	Stadium: Neo Química Arena; Attendance: 39,603; Referee: Matheus Delgado Candançan

7 February 2024 6	Santos	1–0	Corinthians	Santos
19:30 UTC−3	João Schmidt 23'	Report		Stadium: Vila Belmiro; Attendance: 13,861; Referee: Flávio Rodrigues de Souza

11 February 2024 7	Corinthians	2–0	Portuguesa	São Paulo
16:00 UTC−3	Maycon 44' (pen.); Yuri Alberto 78'	Report		Stadium: Neo Química Arena; Attendance: 39,835; Referee: Luiz Flávio de Oliveira

14 February 2024 8	Botafogo	1–4	Corinthians	Ribeirão Preto
21:35 UTC−3	Maciel 40'	Report	Romero 9', 55'; Wesley 58'; Yuri Alberto 78'	Stadium: Estádio Santa Cruz; Attendance: 17,000; Referee: Fabiano Monteiro dos Santos

18 February 2024 9	Palmeiras	2–2	Corinthians	Barueri
18:00 UTC−3	Endrick 44'; López 68'	Report	Yuri Alberto 87'; Garro 90+10'	Stadium: Arena Barueri (Note: Palmeiras played their home match at Arena Barueri, Barueri instead of their regular stadium Allianz Parque, São Paulo.); Attendance: 29,647; Referee: Raphael Claus

25 February 2024 10	Corinthians	0–1	Ponte Preta	São Paulo
20:00 UTC−3		Report	Iago Dias 6'	Stadium: Neo Química Arena; Attendance: 41,375; Referee: Matheus Delgado Candançan

2 March 2024 11	Corinthians	3–2	Santo André	São Paulo
16:00 UTC−3	Maycon 33'; Yuri Alberto 73'; Pedro Raul 90+5'	Report	Bruno Michel 80'; Lohan 87'	Stadium: Neo Química Arena; Attendance: 43,627; Referee: Flávio Rodrigues de Souza

10 March 2024 12	Água Santa	0–0	Corinthians	São Bernardo do Campo
16:00 UTC−3		Report		Stadium: Estádio 1º de Maio (Note: Água Santa played their home match at Estádio 1º de Maio, São Bernardo do Campo instead of their regular stadium Distrital do Inamar, Diadema due to the pitch's poor conditions.); Attendance: 7,261; Referee: Luiz Flávio de Oliveira

== Copa Sudamericana ==
=== Group stage ===
Pos	Team	Pld	W	D	L	GF	GA	GD	Pts	Qualification	COR	RCM	ARG	NAC
1	(Brazil) Corinthians	6	4	1	1	14	2	+12	13	Advance to round of 16	—	3–0	4–0	4–0
2	(Uruguay) Racing	6	3	2	1	10	8	+2	11	Advance to knockout round play-offs	1–1	—	2–1	2–1
3	(Argentina) Argentinos Juniors	6	3	0	3	7	12	−5	9		1–0	0–3	—	2–1
4	(Paraguay) Nacional	6	0	1	5	6	15	−9	1		0–2	2–2	2–3	—

Source: CONMEBOL
Rules for classification: 1) Points; 2) Goal difference; 3) Goals scored; 4) Away goals scored; 5) CONMEBOL ranking.

2 April 2024 1	Racing (Uruguay)	1–1	(Brazil) Corinthians	Montevideo, Uruguay
21:30 UTC−3	Alaniz 85'	Report	Yuri Alberto 69'	Stadium: Estadio Centenario (Note: Racing played their home match at Estadio Centenario, Montevideo instead of their regular stadium Estadio Osvaldo Roberto, Montevideo, which did not meet CONMEBOL requirements.); Attendance: 1,685; Referee: Jhon Hinestroza (Colombia)

9 April 2024 2	Corinthians (Brazil)	4–0	(Paraguay) Nacional	São Paulo, Brazil
19:00 UTC−3	Romero 22', 73'; Yuri Alberto 64'; Pedro Raul 89'	Report		Stadium: Neo Química Arena; Attendance: 32,351; Referee: Jhon Ospina (Colombia)

23 April 2024 3	Argentinos Juniors (Argentina)	1–0	(Brazil) Corinthians	Buenos Aires, Argentina
21:30 UTC−3	Verón 2'	Report		Stadium: Estadio Diego Armando Maradona; Attendance: Undisclosed; Referee: Piero Maza (Chile)

7 May 2024 4	Nacional (Paraguay)	0–2	(Brazil) Corinthians	Asunción, Paraguay
19:00 UTC−3		Report	Yuri Alberto 75'; Matheuzinho 90+6'	Stadium: Estadio Defensores del Chaco (Note: Nacional played their home match at Estadio Defensores del Chaco, Asunción instead of their regular stadium Estadio Arsenio Erico, Asunción, which did not meet CONMEBOL requirements.); Attendance: 2,058; Referee: Ángel Arteaga (Venezuela)

14 May 2024 5	Corinthians (Brazil)	4–0	(Argentina) Argentinos Juniors	São Paulo, Brazil
21:30 UTC−3	Yuri Alberto 9', 43'; Wesley 41'; Vera 90+2'	Report		Stadium: Neo Química Arena; Attendance: 40,049; Referee: Felipe González (Chile)

28 May 2024 6	Corinthians (Brazil)	3–0	(Uruguay) Racing	São Paulo, Brazil
19:00 UTC−3	Garro 22'; Ferreira 25' (o.g.); Coronado 58'	Report		Stadium: Neo Química Arena; Attendance: 40,473; Referee: Roberto Pérez (Peru)

=== Knockout stages ===
13 August 2024 Round of 16	Red Bull Bragantino (Brazil)	1–2	(Brazil) Corinthians	Ribeirão Preto, Brazil
21:30 UTC−3	Helinho 56'	Report	Giovane 6'; Talles Magno 14'	Stadium: Estádio Santa Cruz (Note: Red Bull Bragantino played their home match at Estádio Santa Cruz, Ribeirão Preto instead of their regular stadium Estádio Nabi Abi Chedid, Bragança Paulista, which did not meet CONMEBOL requirements.); Attendance: 11,674; Referee: Felipe González (Chile) (Note: Referee Piero Maza from Chile, who was originally assigned to the Red Bull Bragantino v Corinthians match, was replaced due to injury by Felipe González, also from Chile.)

20 August 2024 Round of 16	Corinthians (Brazil)	1–2 (3–3 agg.) (5–4 p)	(Brazil) Red Bull Bragantino	São Paulo, Brazil
21:30 UTC−3	Garro 24'	Report	Sasha 72'; Luan Cândido 76'	Stadium: Neo Química Arena; Attendance: 42,312; Referee: Andrés Rojas (Colombia)
	Penalties
	Garro (penalty scored); Ramalho (penalty missed); Matheus Bidu (penalty scored); Pedro Henrique (penalty scored); Wesley (penalty scored); Ryan (penalty missed); Gustavo Henrique (penalty scored)		(penalty scored) Sasha; (penalty scored) Lucas Evangelista; (penalty scored) Luan Cândido; (penalty scored) Borbas; (penalty missed) Gustavinho; (penalty missed) Douglas Mendes; (penalty missed) Guilherme

17 September 2024 Quarter-finals	Fortaleza (Brazil)	0–2	(Brazil) Corinthians	Fortaleza, Brazil
21:30 UTC−3		Report	Coronado 39'; Yuri Alberto 90'	Stadium: Castelão; Attendance: 46,617; Referee: Darío Herrera (Argentina)

24 September 2024 Quarter-finals	Corinthians (Brazil)	3–0 (5–0 agg.)	(Brazil) Fortaleza	São Paulo, Brazil
21:30 UTC−3	Romero 55'; Coronado 59'; Pedro Henrique 81'	Report		Stadium: Neo Química Arena; Attendance: 44,680; Referee: Piero Maza (Chile)

24 October 2024 Semi-finals	Corinthians (Brazil)	2–2	(Argentina) Racing	São Paulo, Brazil
21:30 UTC−3	Yuri Alberto 11', 33'	Report	Salas 6'; Martirena 54'	Stadium: Neo Química Arena; Attendance: 44,238; Referee: Gustavo Tejera (Uruguay)

31 October 2024 Semi-finals	Racing (Argentina)	2–1 (4–3 agg.)	(Brazil) Corinthians	Avellaneda, Argentina
21:30 UTC−3	Quintero 36' (pen.), 39'	Report	Yuri Alberto 6'	Stadium: El Cilindro; Attendance: 38,283; Referee: Felipe González (Chile)

== Campeonato Brasileiro ==
Pos	Team	Pld	W	D	L	GF	GA	GD	Pts	Qualification or relegation
5	Internacional	38	18	11	9	53	36	+17	65	Qualification for Copa Libertadores group stage (Note: Botafogo and Flamengo qualified for the Copa Libertadores group stage by winning the 2024 Copa Libertadores and the 2024 Copa do Brasil, respectively.)
6	São Paulo	38	17	8	13	53	43	+10	59	Qualification for Copa Libertadores group stage
7	Corinthians	38	15	11	12	54	45	+9	56	Qualification for Copa Libertadores second stage
8	Bahia	38	15	8	15	49	49	0	53	Qualification for Copa Libertadores second stage
9	Cruzeiro	38	14	10	14	43	41	+2	52	Qualification for Copa Sudamericana group stage

Source: CBF
Rules for classification: 1) points; 2) wins; 3) goal difference; 4) goals scored; 5) head-to-head results (only between two teams); 6) fewest red cards; 7) fewest yellow cards; 8) drawing of lots.

=== Result by round ===
Round	1	2	3	4	5	6	7	8	9	10	11	12	13	14	15	16	17	18	19	20	21	22	23	24	25	26	27	28	29	30	31	32	33	34	35	36	37	38
Ground	H	A	A	H	H	A	H	A	H	A	A	H	A	H	A	A	H	A	H	A	H	H	A	A	H	A	H	A	H	H	A	H	A	H	H	A	H	A
Result	D	L	L	W	D	L	L	D	D	L	D	D	L	W	L	L	W	W	D	L	D	D	D	L	W	L	W	L	D	W	W	W	W	W	W	W	W	W
Position	12	16	18	15	14	16	17	15	16	18	18	18	19	17	17	17	17	14	14	15	18	17	17	18	17	18	17	17	18	17	15	13	11	9	9	8	7	7
Points	1	1	1	4	5	5	5	6	7	7	8	9	9	12	12	12	15	18	19	19	20	21	22	22	25	25	28	28	29	32	35	38	41	44	47	50	53	56

Updated to match(es) played on 8 December 2024. Source: CBF
A = Away; H = Home; W = Win; D = Draw; L = Loss; P = Postponed

=== Matches ===
14 April 2024 1	Corinthians	0–0	Atlético Mineiro	São Paulo
16:00 UTC−3		Report		Stadium: Neo Química Arena; Attendance: 44,597; Referee: Yuri Elino Ferreira da Cruz

17 April 2024 2	Juventude	2–0	Corinthians	Caxias do Sul
20:00 UTC−3	Jean Carlos 53'; Lucas Barbosa 59'	Report		Stadium: Estádio Alfredo Jaconi; Attendance: 7,478; Referee: Bruno Arleu de Araújo

20 April 2024 3	Red Bull Bragantino	1–0	Corinthians	Bragança Paulista
18:30 UTC−3	Vitinho 5'	Report		Stadium: Estádio Nabi Abi Chedid; Attendance: 9,466; Referee: Rafael Rodrigo Klein

28 April 2024 4	Corinthians	3–0	Fluminense	São Paulo
16:00 UTC−3	Wesley 40', 45+2'; Cacá 47'	Report		Stadium: Neo Química Arena; Attendance: 42,119; Referee: Ramon Abatti

4 May 2024 5	Corinthians	0–0	Fortaleza	São Paulo
21:00 UTC−3		Report		Stadium: Neo Química Arena; Attendance: 42,678; Referee: Felipe Fernandes de Lima
Note: The match was originally expected to take place at 16:00 UTC−3, but it was changed to 21:00 UTC−3 due to table adjustments.

11 May 2024 6	Flamengo	2–0	Corinthians	Rio de Janeiro
16:00 UTC−3	Pedro 20'; Lorran 63'	Report		Stadium: Maracanã; Attendance: 56,929; Referee: Ramon Abatti

1 June 2024 7	Corinthians	0–1	Botafogo	São Paulo
21:00 UTC−3		Report	Júnior Santos 59'	Stadium: Neo Química Arena; Attendance: 41,281; Referee: Anderson Daronco
Note: The match was originally scheduled for 19 May, but it was indefinitely postponed on 15 May after CBF decided to suspend the tournament for two matchdays due to the 2024 Rio Grande do Sul floods. The match was rescheduled for 1 June on 22 May.

11 June 2024 8	Atlético Goianiense	2–2	Corinthians	Goiânia
19:00 UTC−3	Cacá 66' (o.g.); Shaylon 90+2' (pen.)	Report	Yuri Alberto 15', 62'	Stadium: Estádio Antônio Accioly; Attendance: 12,089; Referee: Paulo Cesar Zanovelli
Note: The match was originally scheduled for 25 May, but it was indefinitely postponed on 15 May after CBF decided to suspend the tournament for two matchdays due to the 2024 Rio Grande do Sul floods. The match was rescheduled for 12 June on 22 May. On 24 May, the match was anticipated due to broadcast adjustments.

16 June 2024 9	Corinthians	2–2	São Paulo	São Paulo
16:00 UTC−3	Coronado 31'; Gustavo Silva 45+3'	Report	Lucas Moura 4'; Cacá 41' (o.g.)	Stadium: Neo Química Arena; Attendance: 46,129; Referee: Ramon Abatti
Note: The match was originally scheduled for 2 June, but it was rescheduled for 16 June on 22 May due to table adjustments after CBF temporarily suspended the tournament for two matchdays due to the 2024 Rio Grande do Sul floods.

19 June 2024 10	Internacional	1–0	Corinthians	Florianópolis
21:30 UTC−3	Wesley 42'	Report		Stadium: Estádio Orlando Scarpelli (Note: Internacional played their home match at Estádio Orlando Scarpelli, Florianópolis, Santa Catarina, instead of their regular stadium Estádio Beira-Rio, Porto Alegre, Rio Grande do Sul, which was affected by the 2024 Rio Grande do Sul floods.); Attendance: 14,447; Referee: Wagner do Nascimento Magalhães

23 June 2024 11	Athletico Paranaense	1–1	Corinthians	Curitiba
16:00 UTC−3	Christian 45'	Report	Cacá 90+2'	Stadium: Ligga Arena; Attendance: 34,682; Referee: Felipe Fernandes de Lima

26 June 2024 12	Corinthians	1–1	Cuiabá	São Paulo
20:00 UTC−3	Matheus Bidu 85'	Report	Marllon 5'	Stadium: Neo Química Arena; Attendance: 38,473; Referee: Fábio Augusto Santos Sá Junior

1 July 2024 13	Palmeiras	2–0	Corinthians	São Paulo
20:00 UTC−3	Raphael Veiga 53'; Vitor Reis 57'	Report		Stadium: Allianz Parque; Attendance: 41,175; Referee: Anderson Daronco
Note: The match was originally scheduled for 29 June, but it was postponed due to table adjustments.

4 July 2024 14	Corinthians	3–2	Vitória	São Paulo
20:00 UTC−3	Garro 26', 43'; Giovane 90+5'	Report	Alerrandro 37', 86' (pen.)	Stadium: Neo Química Arena; Attendance: 37,956; Referee: Gustavo Ervino Bauermann
Note: The match was originally scheduled for 3 July, but it was postponed due to table adjustments.

7 July 2024 15	Cruzeiro	3–0	Corinthians	Belo Horizonte
16:00 UTC−3	Matheus Pereira 6'; Barreal 45+5'; Veron 48'	Report		Stadium: Mineirão; Attendance: 55,186; Referee: Alex Gomes Stefano

10 July 2024 16	Vasco da Gama	2–0	Corinthians	Rio de Janeiro
19:00 UTC−3	Piton 55'; Sforza 90+5'	Report		Stadium: Estádio São Januário; Attendance: 18,421; Referee: Rafael Rodrigo Klein

16 July 2024 17	Corinthians	2–1	Criciúma	São Paulo
21:00 UTC−3	Romero 54'; Cacá 62'	Report	Claudinho 41'	Stadium: Neo Química Arena; Attendance: 43,241; Referee: Jonathan Benkenstein Pinheiro

21 July 2024 18	Bahia	0–1	Corinthians	Salvador
16:00 UTC−3		Report	Romero 37'	Stadium: Casa de Apostas Arena Fonte Nova; Attendance: 48,346; Referee: Felipe Fernandes de Lima

25 July 2024 19	Corinthians	2–2	Grêmio	São Paulo
20:00 UTC−3	Yuri Alberto 25' (pen.); Garro 87'	Report	Rodrigo Ely 2'; Villasanti 76'	Stadium: Neo Química Arena; Attendance: 45,481; Referee: Alex Gomes Stefano

28 July 2024 20	Atlético Mineiro	2–1	Corinthians	Belo Horizonte
19:00 UTC−3	Hulk 32' (pen.), 85' (pen.)	Report	Yuri Alberto 39'	Stadium: Arena MRV; Attendance: 44,048; Referee: Bruno Arleu de Araújo

4 August 2024 21	Corinthians	1–1	Juventude	São Paulo
16:00 UTC−3	Pedro Henrique 48'	Report	Alan Ruschel 4'	Stadium: Neo Química Arena; Attendance: 44,184; Referee: Lucas Paulo Torezin

10 August 2024 22	Corinthians	1–1	Red Bull Bragantino	São Paulo
21:30 UTC−3	Talles Magno 90+4'	Report	Helinho 39'	Stadium: Neo Química Arena; Attendance: 42,018; Referee: Felipe Fernandes de Lima

17 August 2024 23	Fluminense	0–0	Corinthians	Rio de Janeiro
21:00 UTC−3		Report		Stadium: Maracanã; Attendance: 30,475; Referee: Bráulio da Silva Machado

25 August 2024 24	Fortaleza	1–0	Corinthians	Fortaleza
16:00 UTC−3	Pikachu 77'	Report		Stadium: Castelão; Attendance: 51,297; Referee: Felipe Fernandes de Lima

1 September 2024 25	Corinthians	2–1	Flamengo	São Paulo
16:00 UTC−3	Talles Magno 26'; Romero 60'	Report	Pedro 37' (pen.)	Stadium: Neo Química Arena; Attendance: 45,635; Referee: Ramon Abatti

14 September 2024 26	Botafogo	2–1	Corinthians	Rio de Janeiro
21:00 UTC−3	Luiz Henrique 39'; Almada 67'	Report	Garro 63' (pen.)	Stadium: Estádio Olímpico Nilton Santos; Attendance: 32,718; Referee: Anderson Daronco

21 September 2024 27	Corinthians	3–0	Atlético Goianiense	São Paulo
16:00 UTC−3	Romero 45+4', 55'; Garro 83'	Report		Stadium: Neo Química Arena; Attendance: 46,281; Referee: Bruno Arleu de Araújo

29 September 2024 28	São Paulo	3–1	Corinthians	Brasília
16:00 UTC−3	Lucas Moura 45+7' (pen.); Arboleda 75'; André Silva 90+8'	Report	Yuri Alberto 83'	Stadium: Arena BRB Mané Garrincha (Note: São Paulo played their home match at Arena BRB Mané Garrincha, Brasília, Distrito Federal, instead of their regular stadium MorumBIS, São Paulo, São Paulo , which will host a series of Bruno Mars shows.); Attendance: 25,898; Referee: Rafael Rodrigo Klein

5 October 2024 29	Corinthians	2–2	Internacional	São Paulo
19:00 UTC−3	Yuri Alberto 3', 73' (pen.)	Report	Bernabei 17'; Ricardo Mathias 90+4'	Stadium: Neo Química Arena; Attendance: 44,866; Referee: Lucas Paulo Torezin

17 October 2024 30	Corinthians	5–2	Athletico Paranaense	São Paulo
20:00 UTC−3	Matheuzinho 5'; Cacá 18'; Depay 55'; Garro 66'; Yuri Alberto 78'	Report	Nikão 30'; Erick 39'	Stadium: Neo Química Arena; Attendance: 44,399; Referee: Wilton Pereira Sampaio
Note: The match was originally scheduled for 19–20 October, but the dates were changed with the second match of the Copa do Brasil semi-finals in an unilateral decision by CBF after a request by Flamengo, despite Corinthians opposition to it. The club appealed the decision, but the Supremo Tribunal de Justiça Desportiva (STJD) declined to restore the original dates.

28 October 2024 31	Cuiabá	0–1	Corinthians	Cuiabá
18:00 UTC−4		Report	Depay 44' (pen.)	Stadium: Arena Pantanal; Attendance: 16,680; Referee: Bruno Arleu de Araújo

4 November 2024 32	Corinthians	2–0	Palmeiras	São Paulo
20:00 UTC−3	Garro 41'; Yuri Alberto 56'	Report		Stadium: Neo Química Arena; Attendance: 46,473; Referee: Wilton Pereira Sampaio

9 November 2024 33	Vitória	1–2	Corinthians	Salvador
16:30 UTC−3	Alerrandro 9'	Report	Yuri Alberto 24'; Depay 69'	Stadium: Barradão; Attendance: 30,096; Referee: Bruno Arleu de Araújo

20 November 2024 34	Corinthians	2–1	Cruzeiro	São Paulo
11:00 UTC−3	Depay 11'; Yuri Alberto 16'	Report	Kaiki Bruno 34'	Stadium: Neo Química Arena; Attendance: 46,056; Referee: Jonathan Benkenstein Pinheiro

24 November 2024 35	Corinthians	3–1	Vasco da Gama	São Paulo
16:00 UTC−3	Gustavo Henrique 11'; Garro 15', 24'	Report	Puma Rodríguez 76'	Stadium: Neo Química Arena; Attendance: 46,083; Referee: Davi de Oliveira Lacerda

30 November 2024 36	Criciúma	2–4	Corinthians	Criciúma
19:30 UTC−3	Bolasie 30', 38'	Report	Garro 62'; Matheus Bidu 65'; Yuri Alberto 83', 90+4'	Stadium: Estádio Heriberto Hülse; Attendance: 18,075; Referee: Anderson Daronco

3 December 2024 37	Corinthians	3–0	Bahia	São Paulo
20:00 UTC−3	Depay 12', 61'; Yuri Alberto 45+4'	Report		Stadium: Neo Química Arena; Attendance: 46,263; Referee: Bruno Arleu de Araújo

8 December 2024 38	Grêmio	0–3	Corinthians	Porto Alegre
16:00 UTC−3		Report	Yuri Alberto 45+1' (pen.); Charles 88'; Depay 90+3'	Stadium: Arena do Grêmio; Attendance: 42,699; Referee: Paulo Cesar Zanovelli

== Copa do Brasil ==
=== Preliminary stages ===
22 February 2024 First round	Cianorte	0–3	Corinthians	Maringá
20:00 UTC−3		Report	Wesley 2'; Romero 31', 63'	Stadium: Estádio Willie Davids (Note: Cianorte played their home match at Estádio Willie Davids, Maringá instead of their regular stadium Estádio Olimpico Albino Turbay, Cianorte.); Attendance: 11,952; Referee: Paulo Cesar Zanovelli

14 March 2024 Second round	São Bernardo	0–2	Corinthians	São Bernardo do Campo
20:00 UTC−3		Report	Yuri Alberto 6' (pen.); Pedro Raul 26'	Stadium: Estádio 1º de Maio; Attendance: 11,903; Referee: Bráulio da Silva Machado

1 May 2024 Third round	América-RN	1–2	Corinthians	Natal
20:00 UTC−3	Norberto 13'	Report	Bidon 30'; Cacá 63'	Stadium: Arena das Dunas; Attendance: 26,415; Referee: Maguielson Lima Barbosa

22 May 2024 Third round	Corinthians	2–1 (4–2 agg.)	América-RN	São Paulo
20:00 UTC−3	Yuri Alberto 42'; Cacá 90+1'	Report	Wenderson 52'	Stadium: Neo Química Arena; Attendance: 39,355; Referee: Lucas Paulo Torezin
Note: The match was originally scheduled for 21 May, but it was postponed due to table adjustments for Corinthians' match against Botafogo in the 2024 Campeonato Brasileiro Série A on 19 May.

=== Knockout stages ===
31 July 2024 Round of 16	Corinthians	0–0	Grêmio	São Paulo
21:30 UTC−3		Report		Stadium: Neo Química Arena; Attendance: 43,315; Referee: Marcelo de Lima Henrique

7 August 2024 Round of 16	Grêmio	0–0 (0–0 agg.) (1–3 p)	Corinthians	Curitiba
21:30 UTC−3		Report		Stadium: Estádio Couto Pereira (Note: Grêmio played their home match at Estádio Couto Pereira, Curitiba, Paraná instead of their regular stadium Arena do Grêmio, Porto Alegre, Rio Grande do Sul, which was affected by the 2024 Rio Grande do Sul floods.); Attendance: 29,409; Referee: Bruno Arleu de Araújo
	Penalties
	Reinaldo (penalty scored); Edenilson (penalty missed); Cristaldo (penalty missed); Pavón (penalty missed)		(penalty scored) Romero; (penalty scored) Ramalho; (penalty scored) Giovane

29 August 2024 Quarter-finals	Juventude	2–1	Corinthians	Caxias do Sul
20:00 UTC−3	Carillo 67'; Danilo Boza 87'	Report	Gustavo Henrique 90+3'	Stadium: Estádio Alfredo Jaconi; Attendance: 14,117; Referee: Paulo Cesar Zanovelli

11 September 2024 Quarter-finals	Corinthians	3–1 (4–3 agg.)	Juventude	São Paulo
21:00 UTC−3	Romero 29'; Zé Marcos 82' (o.g.); Ramalho 90+7'	Report	Hugo Souza 41' (o.g.)	Stadium: Neo Química Arena; Attendance: 45,509; Referee: Wagner do Nascimento Magalhães

2 October 2024 Semi-finals	Flamengo	1–0	Corinthians	Rio de Janeiro
21:45 UTC−3	Alex Sandro 32'	Report		Stadium: Maracanã; Attendance: 47,052; Referee: Wilton Pereira Sampaio

20 October 2024 Semi-finals	Corinthians	0–0 (0–1 agg.)	Flamengo	São Paulo
16:00 UTC−3		Report		Stadium: Neo Química Arena; Attendance: 46,977; Referee: Anderson Daronco
Note: The match was originally scheduled for 16–17 October, but the dates were changed with the matchday 30 of the Campeonato Brasileiro in an unilateral decision by CBF after a request by Flamengo, despite Corinthians opposition to it. The club appealed the decision, but the Supremo Tribunal de Justiça Desportiva (STJD) declined to restore the original dates.

== See also ==
- List of Sport Club Corinthians Paulista seasons
