= List of SC Corinthians Paulista managers =

== List of managers ==
- (Brazil) Amílcar Barbuy (1915–16), (1917–18), (1919), (1920)
- (Brazil) Neco (1920), (1927)
- (Uruguay) Pedro Mazzulo (1933–34)
- (Brazil) Amílcar Barbuy (1934), (1935), (1936)
- (Brazil) Rato (1937)
- (Brazil) Neco (1937–38)
- (Brazil) Armando Del Debbio (1939–42)
- (Brazil) Rato (1942–43)
- (Brazil) Amílcar Barbuy (1943)
- (Brazil) Armando Del Debbio (1947–48)
- (Brazil) Cláudio (1948)
- (Brazil) Rato (1951–54)
- (Brazil) Cláudio (1954)
- (Brazil) Osvaldo Brandão (1954–57)
- (Brazil) Cláudio (1956), (1958), (1959)
- (Brazil) Sylvio Pirillo (1959–60)
- (Brazil) Alfredo Ramos (1961)
- (Brazil) Martim Francisco (1961–62)
- (Paraguay) Manuel Fleitas Solich (1962)
- (Brazil) Armando Del Debbio (1963)
- (Brazil) Paulo Amaral (1964)
- (Brazil) Roberto Belangero (1964)
- (Brazil) Osvaldo Brandão (1964–66)
- (Brazil) Zezé Moreira (1966–67)
- (Brazil) Lula (1967–68)
- (Brazil) Osvaldo Brandão (1968)
- (Brazil) Dino Sani (1969–70)
- (Brazil) Yustrich (1973–74)
- (Brazil) Sylvio Pirillo (1974–75)
- (Brazil) Dino Sani (1975)
- (Brazil) Osvaldo Brandão (1977–78)
- (Argentina) Armando Renganeschi (1978)
- (Brazil) Jorge Vieira (1979–80)
- (Brazil) Osvaldo Brandão (1980–81)
- (Brazil) Mário Travaglini (1982–83)
- (Brazil) Zé Maria (1983)
- (Brazil) Jorge Vieira (1983–84)
- (Brazil) Jair Picerni (1984–85)
- (Brazil) Carlos Alberto Torres (1985–86)
- (Brazil) Rubens Minelli (1986)
- (Brazil) Jorge Vieira (1986–87)
- (Brazil) Jair Pereira (1988)
- (Brazil) Ênio Andrade (1989)
- (Brazil) Nelsinho Baptista (1990–91)
- (Brazil) Cilinho (1991)
- (Brazil) Nelsinho Baptista (1992–93)
- (Brazil) Jair Pereira (1994)
- (Brazil) Carlos Alberto Silva (1994–95)
- (Brazil) Valdir Espinosa (1996)
- (Brazil) Nelsinho Baptista (1996–97)
- (Brazil) Joel Santana (1997)
- (Brazil) Vanderlei Luxemburgo (1998)
- (Brazil) Evaristo de Macedo (1999)
- (Brazil) Oswaldo de Oliveira (1999–00)
- (Brazil) Vadão (2000)
- (Brazil) Vanderlei Luxemburgo (2001)
- (Uruguay) Darío Pereyra (2001)
- (Brazil) Carlos Alberto Parreira (2002)
- (Brazil) Geninho (2003)
- (Brazil) Júnior (2003)
- (Brazil) Juninho Fonseca (2003–04)
- (Brazil) Oswaldo de Oliveira (2004)
- (Brazil) Tite (2004–05)
- (Argentina) Daniel Passarella (2005)
- (Brazil) Márcio Bittencourt (2005)
- (Brazil) Antônio Lopes (2005–06)
- (Brazil) Ademar Braga (caretaker) (2006)
- (Brazil) Geninho (2006)
- (Brazil) Émerson Leão (2006-07)
- (Brazil) Paulo César Carpegiani (2007)
- (Brazil) Zé Augusto (caretaker) (2007)
- (Brazil) Nelsinho Baptista (2007)
- (Brazil) Mano Menezes (2008–10)
- (Brazil) Adilson Batista (2010)
- (Brazil) Fábio Carille (caretaker) (2010)
- (Brazil) Tite (2010–13)
- (Brazil) Mano Menezes (2014)
- (Brazil) Tite (2015–16)
- (Brazil) Fábio Carille (caretaker) (2016)
- (Brazil) Cristóvão Borges (2016)
- (Brazil) Fábio Carille (caretaker) (2016)
- (Brazil) Oswaldo de Oliveira (2016)
- (Brazil) Fábio Carille (2017–18)
- (Brazil) Osmar Loss (2018)
- (Brazil) Jair Ventura (2018)
- (Brazil) Fábio Carille (2019)
- (Brazil) Dyego Coelho (caretaker) (2019)
- (Brazil) Tiago Nunes (2020)
- (Brazil) Dyego Coelho (interim) (2020)
- (Brazil) Vágner Mancini (2020-21)
- (Brazil) Fernando Lázaro (caretaker) (2021)
- (Brazil) Sylvinho (2021–2022)
- (Brazil) Fernando Lázaro (caretaker) (2022)
- (Portugal) Vítor Pereira (2022)
- (Brazil) Fernando Lázaro (2023)
- (Brazil) Cuca (2023)
- (Brazil) Danilo (caretaker) (2023)
- (Brazil) Vanderlei Luxemburgo (2023)
- (Brazil) Mano Menezes (2023-2024)
- (Brazil) Thiago Kosloski (caretaker) (2024)
- (Portugal) António Oliveira (2024)
- (Brazil) Raphael Laruccia (caretaker) (2024)
- (Argentina) Ramón Díaz (2024-2025)
- (Brazil) Orlando Ribeiro (caretaker) (2025)
- (Brazil) Dorival Junior (2025-2026)
- (Brazil) Fernando Diniz (2026)
- (Brazil) William Batista (caretaker) (2026)
- (Netherlands) Clarence Seedorf (2026–)
