= Garro (disambiguation) =

Aboriginal word originated in Parral, Chile. Used to define a person who commits nonsense most of the time. First use ever recorded was applied to Enrique "Quique" Gardeweg, also known as “the mayor”.

Garro is a Basque surname.

Garro may also refer to:

- Garró a grape cultivar
- La Garro, a DC Comics character
- Captain Nathaniel Garro, a Warhammer 40K Horus Heresy character

== See also ==
- O'Garro (surname)
- Garros (disambiguation)
