= Garros =

Garros may refer to:

== People ==
- Boris Garrós (born 1988), Spanish soccer player
- Cristina Garros Martínez, Argentine judge
- Christian Garros (1930–1988), French jazz musician
- Pey de Garros (1530–1585), Occitan poet
- Roland Garros (aviator) (1888–1918), a pioneering aviator and WWI pilot for France

== Places ==
- Garros (township), Staffin, Highland, Scotland, UK
- Roland Garros Airport, Sainte-Marie, Reunion, France
- Stade Roland Garros (English: Roland Garros Stadium), Paris, Ile-de-France, France
- Garros Galería (English: Garros Gallery), Colonia Roma, Mexico City, Mexico

== Other uses ==
- Roland-Garros, or, the French Open of tennis

== See also ==
- O'Garro (surname)
- Garro (disambiguation)
- Roland Garros (disambiguation)
