= Garro =

Garro or de Garro is a Basque surname. Notable people with the surname include:

- Daniel Garro (born 1990), Argentine footballer
- Elena Garro (1916–1998), Mexican author
- Jerónimo de Garro (16th-century), Basque nobleman
- José Antonio Ardanza Garro (born 1941), Spanish politician
- José de Garro (1623–1702), Spanish colonial administrator
- Juan Garro (born 1992), Argentine footballer
- Magdalena Garro (born 1989), Argentine canoeist
- Miki Garro (born 1975), Spanish footballer
- Nacho Garro (born 1981), Spanish footballer
- Rodrigo Garro (born 1998), Argentine footballer
- Sebastián de Garro (15th century), Basque nobleman
- Sykes Garro (born 1993), Gibraltarian footballer

== See also ==
- Garr
