= Caetano (footballer, born 1999) =

Brazilian footballer (born 1999)

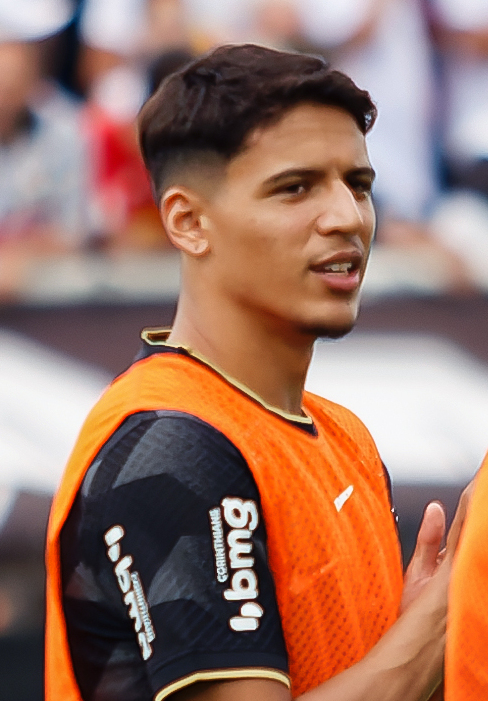
- Caetano with Corinthians in 2023

Personal information
- Full name: João Victor Andrade Caetano
- Date of birth: 24 June 1999 (age 27)
- Place of birth: Rio de Janeiro, Brazil
- Height: 1.82 m (6 ft 0 in)
- Position: Centre-back

Team information
- Current team: Vissel Kobe
- Number: 16

Youth career
- Vasco da Gama
- Botafogo
- 2018–2019: Corinthians

Senior career*
Years	Team	Apps	(Gls)
2019–2024	Corinthians	31	(0)
2019	→ Oeste (loan)	23	(1)
2020	→ Coritiba (loan)	4	(0)
2020–2021	→ Oeste (loan)	20	(0)
2021	→ São Caetano (loan)	8	(1)
2021	→ CRB (loan)	33	(0)
2022	→ Goiás (loan)	37	(1)
2025–	Vissel Kobe	19	(0)
- * Club domestic league appearances and goals as of 10 August 2026

João Victor Andrade Caetano (born 24 June 1999), commonly known as Caetano is a Brazilian professional footballer who plays as a centre-back and currently play for J1 League club, Vissel Kobe.

== Career ==
=== Corinthians ===
Born in Rio de Janeiro, Caetano played for the youth sides of Vasco da Gama and Botafogo before joining Corinthians' youth sides in 2018, aged 19.

==== Loans ====
On 3 July 2019, after featuring with the under-20s, Caetano was loaned to Série B side Oeste until the end of the year. He made his senior debut nine days later, starting in a 3–2 away loss to Ponte Preta.

Caetano scored his first senior goal on 13 September 2019, netting Oeste's second in a 3–0 home win over Operário Ferroviário. The following 7 January, after being regularly used, he moved to Coritiba also in a temporary deal.

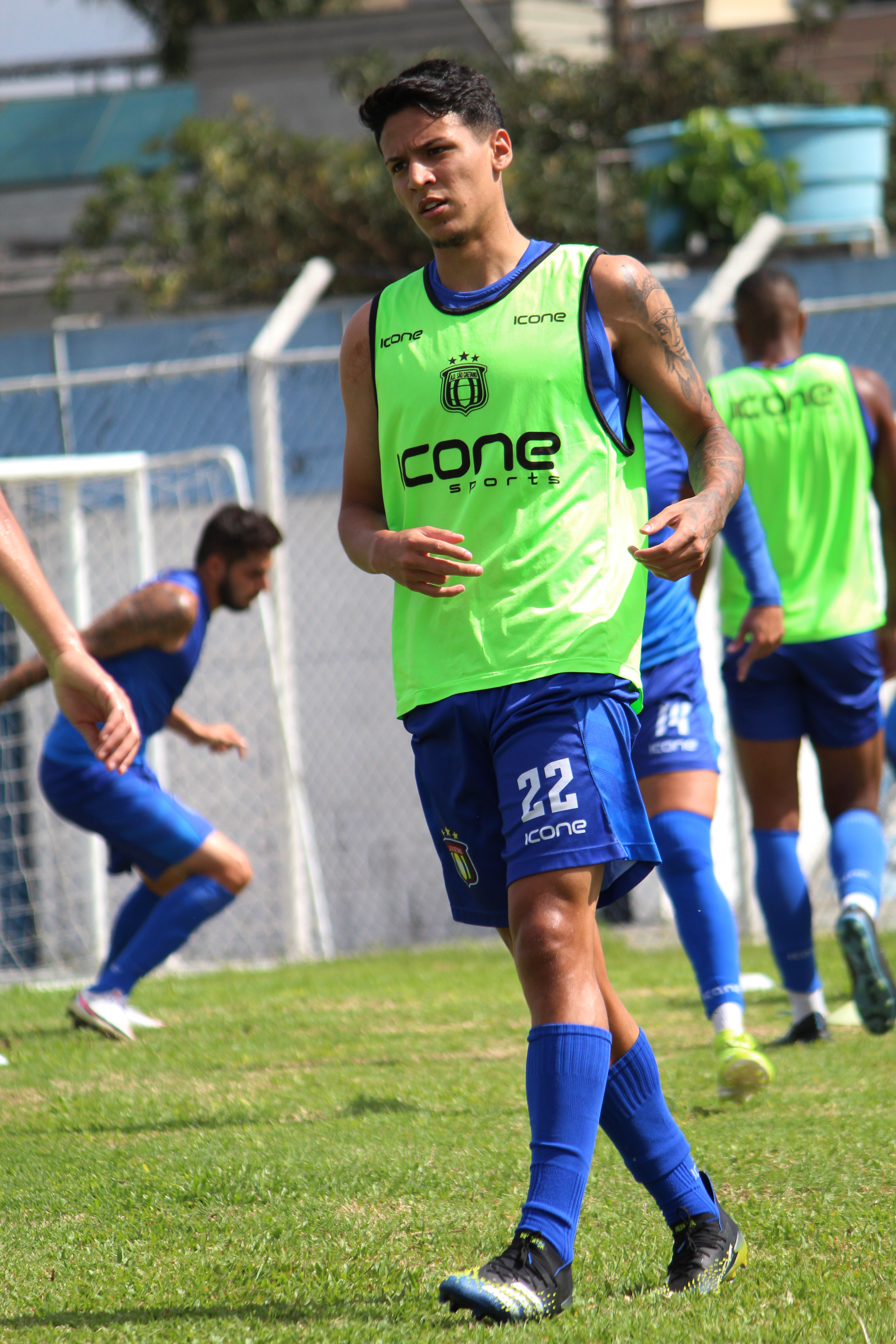
Caetano training with São Caetano in 2021

In July 2020, Caetano left Coxa after being rarely used, and returned to Oeste again on loan. On 8 February 2021, after suffering relegation, Corinthians announced his loan to São Caetano for the 2021 Campeonato Paulista.

On 2 June 2021, Caetano was loaned to second division side CRB until the end of the year. An undisputed starter, CRB's president confirmed his departure on 13 December, and despite being deemed surplus to requirements by Timão, and was announced at Série A side Goiás on 31 December.

A regular starter during the 2022 Campeonato Goiano, Caetano made his top tier debut on 30 April of that year, starting in a 2–2 home draw against Atlético Mineiro. He scored his first goal in the category on 27 August, netting the opener in a 2–1 home win over rivals Atlético Goianiense.

Despite being a regular starter, Caetano left the Esmeraldino on 24 November 2022, as his loan deal was due to expire.

==== Breakthrough ====
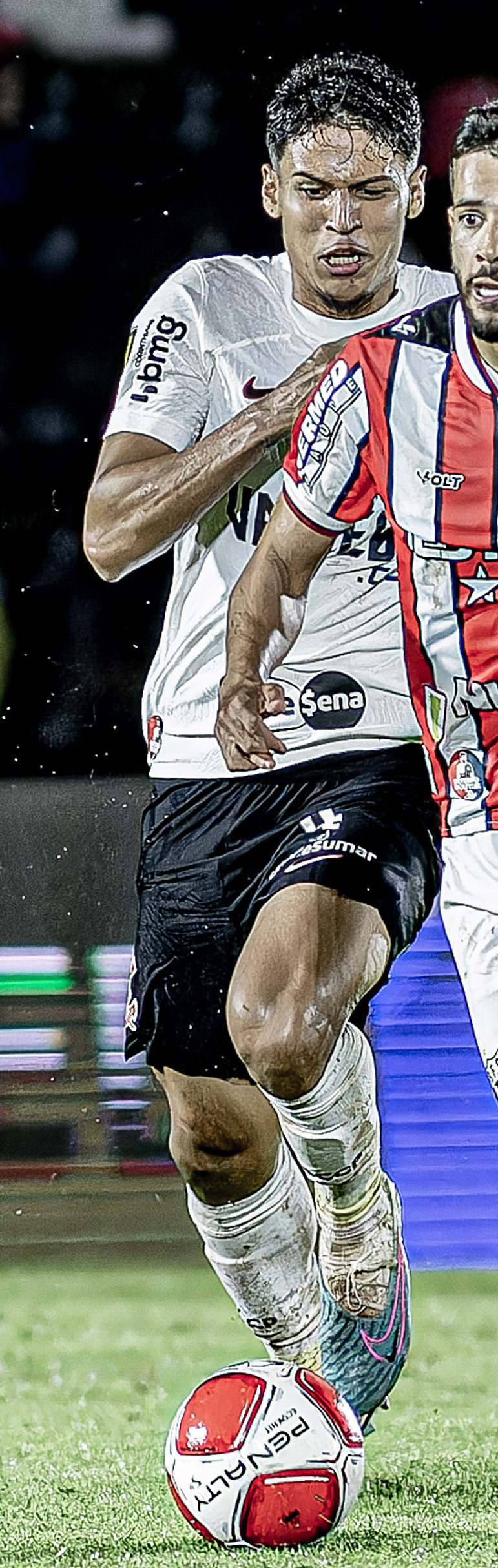
Caetano playing for Corinthians in 2024

Caetano returned to Corinthians for the 2023 season, and renewed his contract until 2024 on 23 January of that year. A backup to starters Gil and Bruno Méndez, he made his debut for the club on 4 March, starting in a 3–1 Campeonato Paulista home win over Santo André.

Caetano started the 2024 season as a first-choice, but lost his starting spot after the arrival of new signing Cacá and coach António Oliveira. He was separated from the squad in October, after rejecting a contract renewal.

=== Vissel Kobe ===
On 7 January 2025, Caetano was abroad to Japan for the first time and signed to J1 2024 champions club, Vissel Kobe for 2025 season.

== Career statistics ==
=== Club ===
As of the start for 2025 season.

Appearances and goals by club, season and competition
Club	Season	League			State League (Note: Includes Campeonato Paulista, Campeonato Goiano)		Cup (Note: Includes Copa do Brasil)		League Cup (Note: Includes J.League Cup)		Continental		Other		Total	
Club	Season	Division	Apps	Goals	Apps	Goals	Apps	Goals	Apps	Goals	Apps	Goals	Apps	Goals	Apps	Goals
Corinthians	2018	Série A	0	0	—		0	0	—		—		—		0	0
Corinthians	2023	Série A	16	0	1	0	1	0	—		5 (Note: Two appearances in Copa Libertadores, three appearances in Copa Sudamericana)	0	—		23	0
Corinthians	2024	Série A	5	0	9	0	1	0	—		0	0	—		15	0
Corinthians	Total		21	0	10	0	2	0	—		5	0	—		38	0
Oeste (loan)	2019	Série B	23	1	—		—		—		—		—		23	1
Coritiba (loan)	2020	Série A	—		4	0	0	0	—		—		—		4	0
Oeste (loan)	2020	Série B	20	0	—		—		—		—		—		20	0
São Caetano (loan)	2021	Série D	—		8	1	—		—		—		—		8	1
CRB (loan)	2021	Série B	33	1	—		2	0	—		—		2 (Note: Appearance(s) in Copa do Nordeste)	0	37	1
Goiás (loan)	2022	Série A	26	1	11	0	5	0	—		—		—		42	1
Vissel Kobe	2025	J1 League	0	0	—		0	0	0	0	0	0	0	0	0	0
Career total			123	3	33	0	9	0	0	0	5	0	2	0	172	4

== Honours ==
Vissel Kobe

- J1 100 Year Vision League: 2026
