= O'Garro =

O'Garro is a surname. Notable people with this name include:

- Lenford O'Garro (born 1965), Vincentian sprinter
- Leovan O'Garro (born 1987), Montserratian soccer player
- Melesha O'Garro (born 1988), British musician

== See also ==
- Garro (surname)
- Garros (disambiguation)
