= Raul Gustavo =

Brazilian footballer (born 1999)

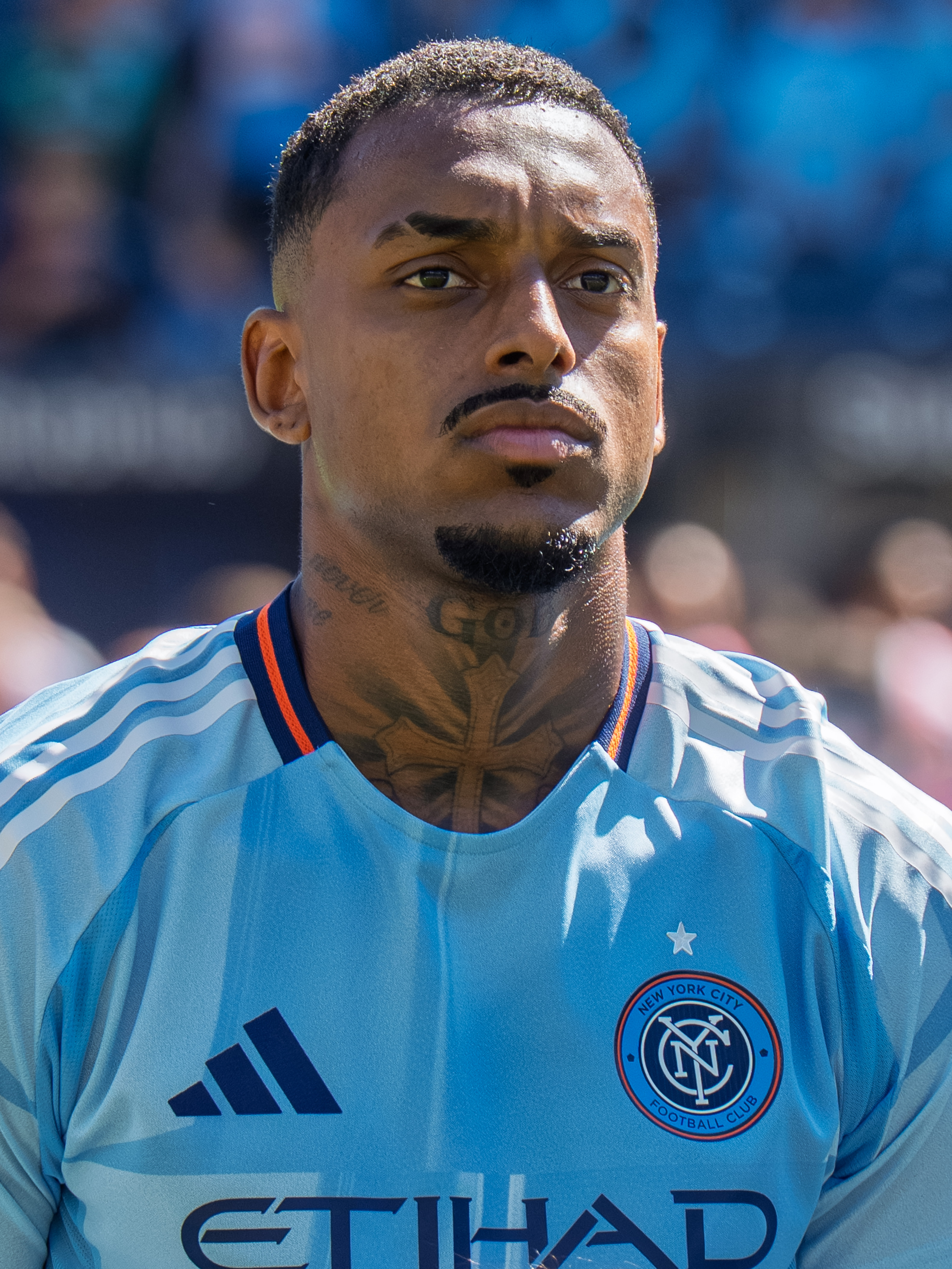
- Raul with New York City FC in 2025

Personal information
- Full name: Raul Gustavo Pereira Bicalho
- Date of birth: 20 April 1999 (age 27)
- Place of birth: Pedro Leopoldo, Brazil
- Height: 1.88 m (6 ft 2 in)
- Position: Centre back

Team information
- Current team: New York City FC
- Number: 34

Youth career
- 2016: Democrata-SL
- 2018: Betinense
- 2019–2020: Corinthians

Senior career*
Years	Team	Apps	(Gls)
2018–2019	Lokomotiva	0	(0)
2020–2024	Corinthians	54	(6)
2020	→ Inter de Limeira (loan)	0	(0)
2023	→ Bahia (loan)	11	(0)
2024–2025	Ferencváros	12	(2)
2025–	New York City FC	5	(0)
- * Club domestic league appearances and goals as of 21:02, 15 February 2026 (UTC)

Raul Gustavo Pereira Bicalho (Pedro Leopoldo 20 April 1999), known as Raul Gustavo, is a Brazilian professional footballer who plays as a centre back for Major League Soccer club New York City FC.

== Club career ==
Raul started his career in the youth squads of Democrata-SL and Betinense, before moving to the professional squad of Croatian club NK Lokomotiva in 2018. He moved over to Corinthians' Under-20s in 2019 and also took part of some Under 23s games.

He was loaned in early 2020 to Inter de Limeira as part of their 2020 Campeonato Paulista participation. Raul returned to the Corinthians after that loan and made his professional debut for the club in a 2020 Campeonato Brasileiro Série A away match against Bahia on 28 January 2021.

His first goal for Corinthians took place on 25 April 2021 in an away win against Santos at the 2021 Campeonato Paulista.

Corinthians announced on June 19, 2024, the transfer of Raul Gustavo to Ferencvaros, from Hungary. He was out of space at Timão and wasn't even involved in the matches. The last match was on April 23, against Argentinos Juniors, when he ended up being sent off for pushing an assistant referee. A graduate of Corinthians, he leaves the club with 54 games played and six goals scored.

Raul Gustavo made his debut for Ferencváros in a friendly game against Sepsi OSK, from Romania, on June 27, 2024, the game ended in a 4-4 draw.

== Career statistics ==
As of match played 18 October 2025

Appearances and goals by club, season, and competition
Club	Season	League			State League		Cup		Continental		Other		Total	
Club	Season	Division	Apps	Goals	Apps	Goals	Apps	Goals	Apps	Goals	Apps	Goals	Apps	Goals
Corinthians	2020	Série A	1	0	—		0	0	0	0	—		1	0
Corinthians	2021	Série A	3	0	6	2	1	0	3 (Note: Appearance(s) in Copa Sudamericana)	0	—		13	2
Corinthians	2022	Série A	20	2	3	1	3	1	7 (Note: Appearance(s) in Copa Libertadores)	0	—		33	4
Corinthians	2024	Série A	1	0	4	0	0	0	1	0	—		6	0
Corinthians	Total		25	2	13	3	4	1	11	0	—		53	6
Inter de Limeira (loan)	2020	Paulista	—		0	0	—		—		—		0	0
Bahia (loan)	2023	Série A	7	0	6	0	0	0	—		5 (Note: Appearance(s) in Copa do Nordeste)	0	18	0
Ferencvárosi	2024–25	NB I	12	2	—		3	0	9 (Note: Four appearances in UEFA Champions League, five appearances in UEFA Europa League)	0	—		24	2
New York City FC	2025	MLS	5	0	—		—		—		0	0	5	0
Career total			49	4	19	3	7	1	20	0	5	0	100	8

== Honours ==
Bahia

- Campeonato Baiano: 2023

Ferencváros

- Nemzeti Bajnokság I: 2024–25
