= Félix Torres (footballer, born 1997) =

Ecuadorian footballer (born 1997)

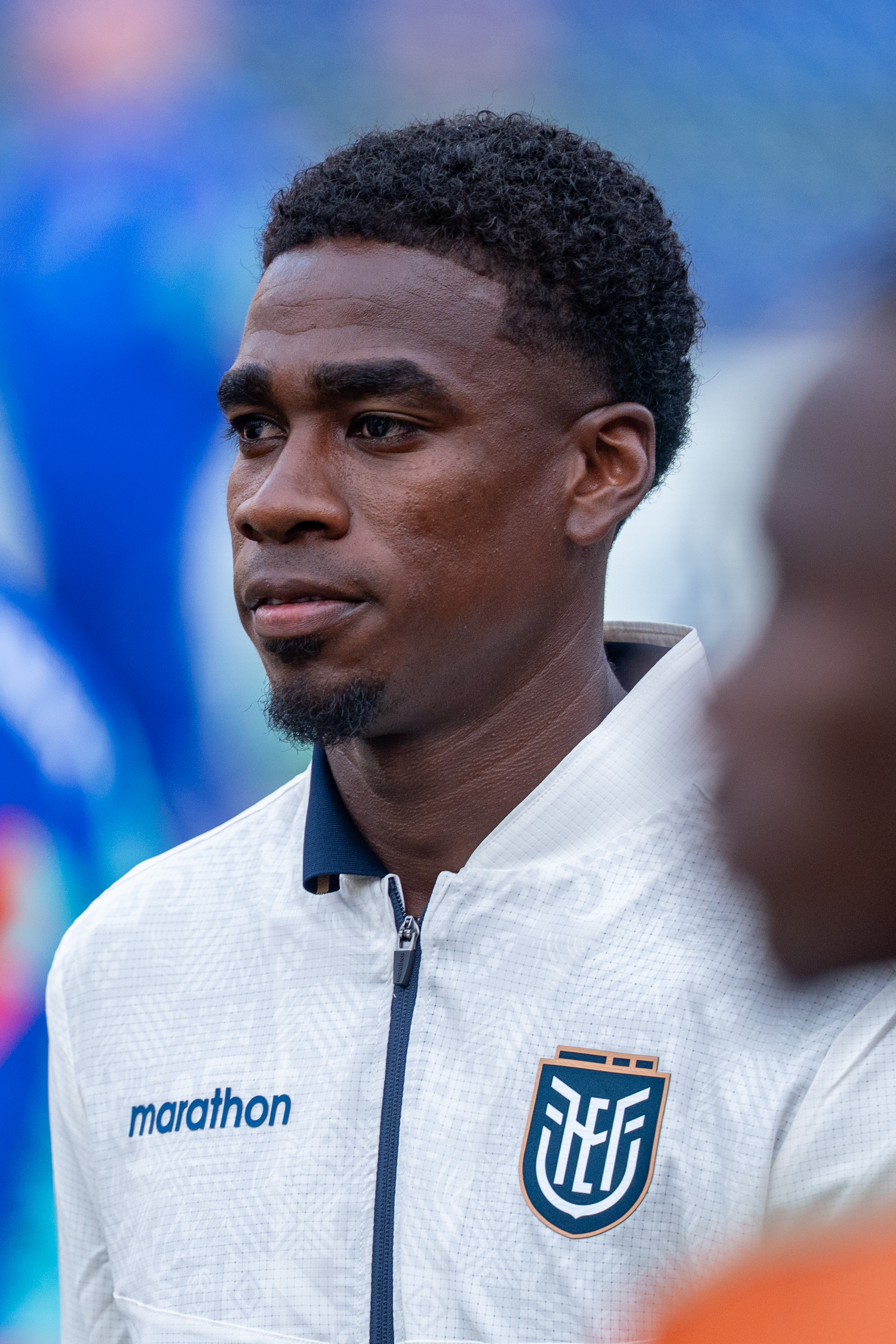
- Torres with Ecuador in 2026

Personal information
- Full name: Félix Eduardo Torres Caicedo
- Date of birth: 11 January 1997 (age 29)
- Place of birth: San Lorenzo, Esmeraldas, Ecuador
- Height: 1.87 m (6 ft 2 in)
- Position: Centre-back

Team information
- Current team: Internacional (on loan from Corinthians)
- Number: 4

Youth career
- 2013–2015: Alianza del Pailón

Senior career*
Years	Team	Apps	(Gls)
2016–2017	LDU Portoviejo		
2016–2017	→ Barcelona S.C. (loan)	27	(1)
2017–2019	Barcelona S.C.	14	(3)
2019–2023	Santos Laguna	126	(12)
2024–	Corinthians	53	(0)
2026–	→ Internacional (loan)	25	(2)

International career^{‡}
2017	Ecuador U20	8	(0)
2019–	Ecuador	52	(5)
- * Club domestic league appearances and goals as of 11 October 2026 ‡ National team caps and goals as of 5 October 2026

Félix Eduardo Torres Caicedo (born 11 January 1997) is an Ecuadorian professional footballer who plays as a centre-back for Campeonato Brasileiro Serie A club SC Internacional on loan from Corinthians and the Ecuador national team.

After beginning his career with LDU Portoviejo, Torres signed for Barcelona in 2017 before joining Santos Laguna in 2019. He made his international debut in 2019 and represented Ecuador at both the 2021 Copa America and the 2022 FIFA World Cup. At the beginning of 2024 he signed with Brazilian team Sport Club Corinthians Paulista.

== Club career ==
Torres began his career with LDU Portoviejo before signing for LigaPro Serie A side Barcelona in December 2016, on an initial one-year loan deal. He made his debut for the side in a 2–1 victory over Macará on 2 July and scored his first goal in a win over Guayaquil City F.C. on 5 November. Two weeks later, Torres joined the club permanently in November 2017 having made six appearances during his loan spell, signing a six-year contract.

In January 2019 Torres transferred over to Mexican club Santos Laguna, following his former Barcelona coach Guillermo Almada who had taken charge of the side. In October 2019 Torres was punished for indiscipline by the club and as of November 2019 has not played since.

Torres was announced at Corinthians on 14 January 2024, signing a four-year contract with the club.

== International career ==
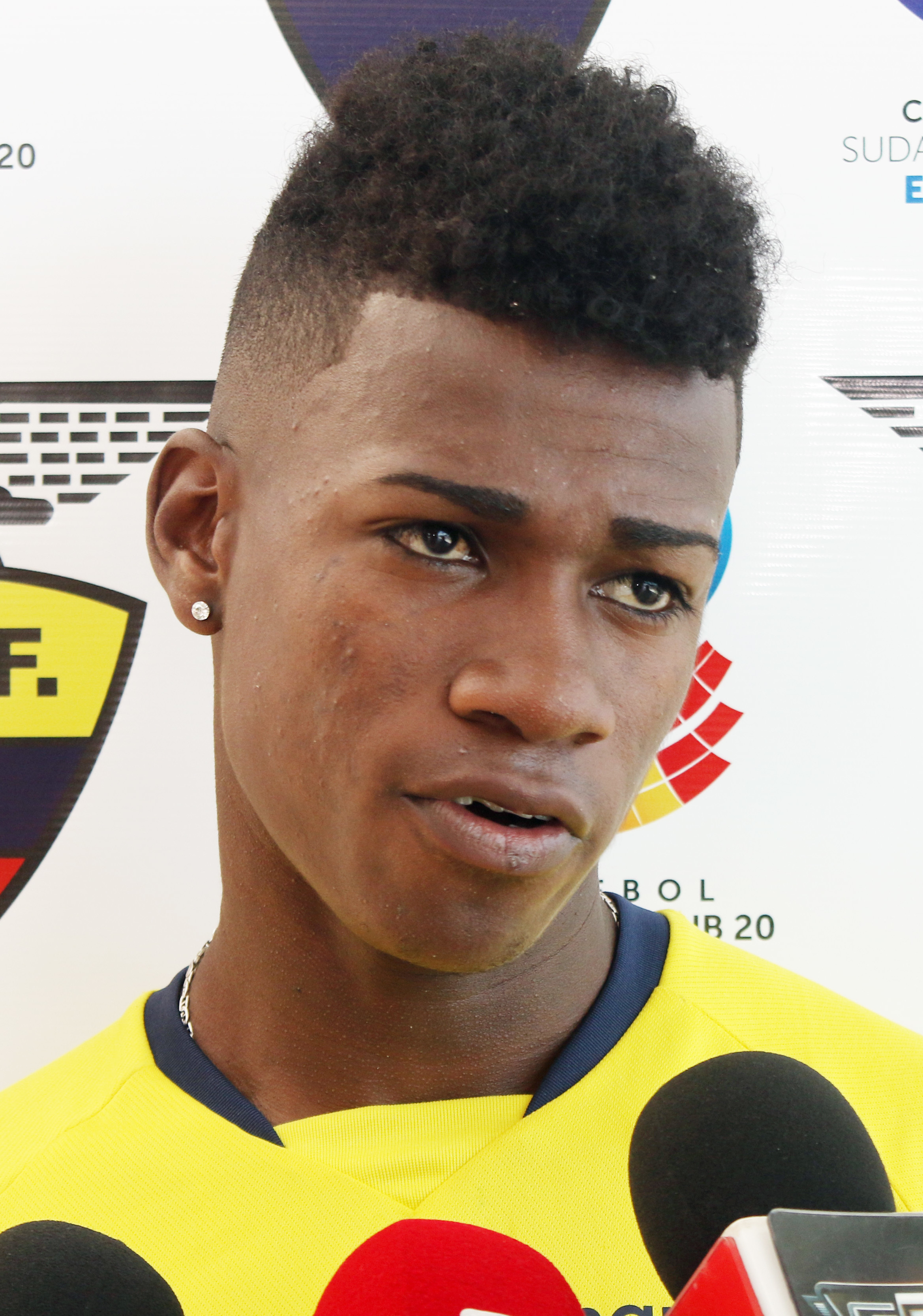
Torres in 2017 with Ecuador U20

After playing for Ecuador at the 2017 FIFA U-20 World Cup, Torres was called up for the national team in February 2017 but did not play.

Torres was selected in the 28 player Ecuador squad for the 2021 Copa América.

Torres was named in the Ecuadorian squad for the 2022 FIFA World Cup, playing in all three of his nation's matches as they were eliminated in the group stage.

Torres was called up to the final 26-man Ecuador squad for the 2024 Copa América.

On 31 May 2026, Torres was selected in the 26-man squad for the 2026 FIFA World Cup.

== Career statistics ==
=== Club ===
As of match played 11 October 2026

Appearances and goals by club, season and competition
Club	Season	League			State League (Note: Includes Campeonato Paulista)		National cup (Note: Includes Copa MX, Copa do Brasil)		Continental		Other		Total	
Club	Season	Division	Apps	Goals	Apps	Goals	Apps	Goals	Apps	Goals	Apps	Goals	Apps	Goals
Barcelona S.C.	2017 (loan)	LigaPro Serie A	27	1	—		—		—		—		27	1
Barcelona S.C.	2018	LigaPro Serie A	6	1	—		—		—		—		6	1
Barcelona S.C.	2019	LigaPro Serie A	8	2	—		—		2 (Note: Appearances in Copa Libertadores)	0	—		10	2
Barcelona S.C.	Total		14	3	—		—		2	0	—		16	3
Santos Laguna	2019–20	Liga MX	13	0	—		7	0	—		—		20	0
Santos Laguna	2020–21	Liga MX	27	1	—		0	0	—		2 (Note: Appearances in Leagues Cup)	0	29	1
Santos Laguna	2021–22	Liga MX	34	3	—		—		1 (Note: Appearance in CONCACAF Champions League)	0	—		35	3
Santos Laguna	2022–23	Liga MX	34	3	—		—		—		2	0	36	3
Santos Laguna	2023–24	Liga MX	18	5	—		—		—		—		18	5
Santos Laguna	Total		126	12	0	0	7	0	1	0	4	0	138	12
Corinthians	2024	Série A	22	0	11	0	9	0	10 (Note: Appearances in Copa Sudamericana)	0	—		52	0
Corinthians	2025	Série A	10	0	10	0	2	0	6 (Note: Two appearances and one goal in Copa Libertadores, three appearances in Copa Sudamericana)	1	—		28	1
Corinthians	Total		32	0	21	0	11	0	16	1	0	0	80	1
Internacional (loan)	2026	Série A	20	1	5	1	2	0	—		—		27	2
Career total			219	16	26	1	20	0	19	1	4	0	288	19

=== International ===
As of match played 5 October 2026

Appearances and goals by national team and year
National team	Year	Apps	Goals
Ecuador	2019	3	0
Ecuador	2021	9	1
Ecuador	2022	8	1
Ecuador	2023	10	3
Ecuador	2024	11	0
Ecuador	2025	3	0
Ecuador	2026	8	0
Total		52	5

Scores and results list Ecuador's goal tally first, score column indicates score after each Torres goal.

List of international goals scored by Félix Torres
No.	Date	Venue	Opponent	Score	Result	Competition
1	2 September 2021	Estadio Rodrigo Paz Delgado, Quito, Ecuador	Paraguay	1–0	2–0	2022 FIFA World Cup qualification
2	27 January 2022	Estadio Rodrigo Paz Delgado, Quito, Ecuador	Brazil	1–1	1–1	2022 FIFA World Cup qualification
3	24 March 2023	Western Sydney Stadium, Sydney, Australia	Australia	1–1	1–3	Friendly
4	12 September 2023	Estadio Rodrigo Paz Delgado, Quito, Ecuador	Uruguay	1–1	2–1	2026 FIFA World Cup qualification
5	12 September 2023	Estadio Rodrigo Paz Delgado, Quito, Ecuador	Uruguay	2–1	2–1	2026 FIFA World Cup qualification

== Honours ==
Corinthians

- Campeonato Paulista: 2025
- Copa do Brasil: 2025

Santos Laguna

- Liga MX Guardianes runner-up: 2021

Internacional

- Campeonato Gaúcho runner-up: 2026
