= Arthur Sousa =

Brazilian footballer (born 2003)

Personal information
- Full name: Arthur Sousa Araújo
- Date of birth: 12 March 2003 (age 23)
- Place of birth: Brasília, Brazil
- Height: 1.84 m (6 ft 0 in)
- Position: Forward

Team information
- Current team: Houston Dynamo 2 (on loan from Red Bull Bragantino)

Youth career
- 2018–2019: Desportivo Brasil
- 2019–2022: Corinthians

Senior career*
Years	Team	Apps	(Gls)
2022–2024	Corinthians	5	(1)
2024–	Red Bull Bragantino	8	(0)
2025	→ Sport Recife (loan)	7	(0)
2025	→ América Mineiro (loan)	19	(2)
2026–	→ Houston Dynamo 2 (loan)	0	(0)
- * Club domestic league appearances and goals as of 17 December 2025

Arthur Sousa Araújo (born 12 March 2003), known as Arthur Sousa, is a Brazilian footballer who plays as a forward for MLS Next Pro club Houston Dynamo 2, on loan from Red Bull Bragantino.

== Club career ==
Born in Brasília, Federal District, Arthur Sousa joined Corinthians' youth setup in 2019, from Desportivo Brasil. On 15 September 2022, he renewed his contract with the former until September 2025.

Arthur Sousa made his first team – and Série A – debut on 1 October 2022, coming on as a late substitute for goalscorer Róger Guedes in a 2–0 home win over Cuiabá.

== Career statistics ==
As of 5 December 2024

Club	Season	League			State League		Cup		Continental		Other		Total	
Club	Season	Division	Apps	Goals	Apps	Goals	Apps	Goals	Apps	Goals	Apps	Goals	Apps	Goals
Corinthians	2022	Série A	1	0	—		0	0	—		—		1	0
Corinthians	2024	Série A	1	0	3	1	0	0	0	0	—		4	1
Corinthians	Total		2	0	3	1	0	0	0	0	—		5	1
Red Bull Bragantino	2024	Série A	8	0	—		—		—		—		8	0
Career total			10	0	3	1	0	0	0	0	0	0	13	1
