= Jerónimo de Garro =

Jerónimo de Garro y Góngora
- Viscount
- Born: Unknown; Navarra, Kingdom of Navarre
- Died: Unknown; Navarra, Kingdom of Navarre
- Noble family: Garro

Jerónimo de Garro (flourished 1500s) was a 16th-century Basque nobleman, Viscount of Zolina and Knight of Calatrava.

Garro was born in Navarra, son of Sebastián de Garro and Isabel de Góngora. His wife was Ana Jaso Azpilcueta, who owned the Castle of Xavier, and granddaughter of Juan de Jasso. Ana also was niece of Saint Francis Xavier.
