= Pedro Raul =

Brazilian footballer (born 1996)

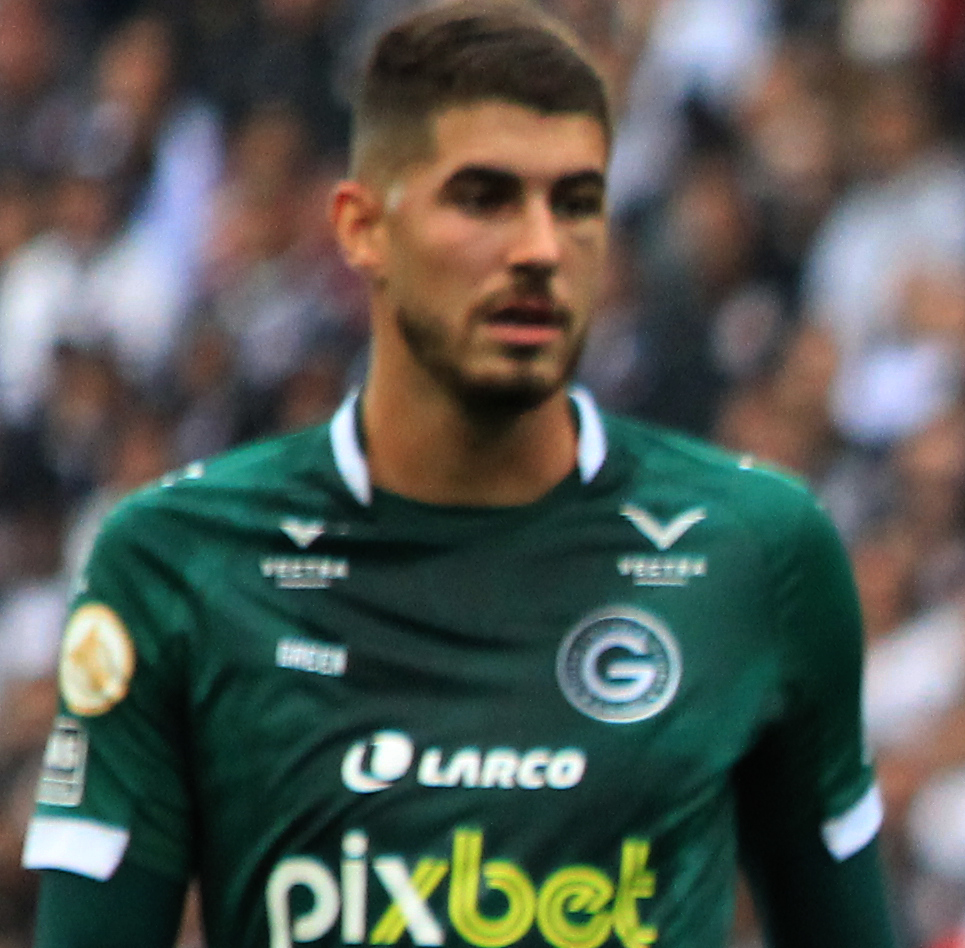

Personal information
- Full name: Pedro Raul Garay da Silva
- Date of birth: 5 November 1996 (age 30)
- Place of birth: Porto Alegre, Brazil
- Height: 6 ft 4 in (1.93 m)
- Position: Striker

Team information
- Current team: Corinthians
- Number: 18

Youth career
- 2015–2016: Cruzeiro-RS

Senior career*
Years	Team	Apps	(Gls)
2016–2017	Cruzeiro-RS	2	(0)
2016	→ Aimoré (loan)	0	(0)
2017–2019	Vitória Guimarães B	24	(4)
2019	→ Atlético Goianiense (loan)	44	(12)
2020–2021	Botafogo	32	(11)
2021–2022	Kashiwa Reysol	8	(3)
2021	→ Juárez (loan)	7	(2)
2022	→ Goiás (loan)	45	(26)
2023	Vasco da Gama	23	(8)
2023–2024	Toluca	15	(2)
2025	→ Ceará (loan)	38	(14)
2024–	Corinthians	55	(3)
- * Club domestic league appearances and goals as of 18 November 2026

Pedro Raul Garay da Silva (born 5 November 1996), known as Pedro Raul, is a Brazilian professional footballer who plays as a striker for Corinthians.

== Club career ==
Born in Porto Alegre, Rio Grande do Sul, Pedro Raul represented local side Cruzeiro-RS before joining Aimoré on loan for the 2016 Super Copa Gaúcha.

After returning to his parent club for the 2017 Campeonato Gaúcho, Pedro Raul only featured twice for Cruzeiro before moving to Vitória de Guimarães on 12 September 2017; he was initially assigned to the B-team in the LigaPro.

On 21 January 2019, Pedro Raul returned to his home country, after agreeing to a one-year loan deal with Série B side Atlético Goianiense. He was a regular starter during the year, winning the Campeonato Goiano and achieving promotion to the Série A.

On 17 January 2020, Pedro Raul was announced as the new signing of Botafogo in the top tier. He made his debut in the category on 19 August, starting in a 2–1 home win over Atlético Mineiro, and scored his first goal in the division on 30 September, but in a 2–1 away loss against Bahia.

As Pedro Raul's contract had an automatic extension if the player appeared in at least 60% of Botafogo's matches and his renewal would cost € 1.5 million (as the player had 70% of his economic rights and Botafogo was obliged to buy him), he was sold to Japanese club Kashiwa Reysol on 11 February 2021, for a fee of R$ 10 million. After having trouble adapting to the new country, and suffering a shoulder injury right after arriving, he only featured sparingly.

On 20 September 2021, Pedro Raul was announced at FC Juárez in the Liga MX. He left the club in December, and returned to Brazil on 31 January 2022, after agreeing to a loan deal with Goiás.

An undisputed starter at the Esmeraldino, Pedro Raul scored 19 league goals in the season (26 overall), being the division's second-best goalscorer (only behind Germán Cano). On 14 November 2022, he left the club.

On 11 December 2022, after standing out in the Brasileirão 2022, Vasco da Gama closed an agreement with Kashiwa Reysol, from Japan, and will pay US$2 million, about R$10.4 million, for the signing of the striker.

== Career statistics ==
As of match played 18 November 2026

Appearances and goals by club, season and competition
Club	Season	League			State League		Cup		Continental		Other		Total	
Club	Season	Division	Apps	Goals	Apps	Goals	Apps	Goals	Apps	Goals	Apps	Goals	Apps	Goals
Aimoré (loan)	2016	Gaúcho	—		0	0	—		—		11 (Note: Appearance(s) in Super Copa Gaúcha)	2	11	2
Cruzeiro-RS	2017	Gaúcho	—		2	0	—		—		—		2	0
Vitória Guimarães B	2017–18	LigaPro	15	4	—		—		—		—		15	4
Vitória Guimarães B	2018–19	LigaPro	9	0	—		—		—		—		9	0
Vitória Guimarães B	Total		24	4	—		—		—		—		24	4
Atlético Goianiense (loan)	2019	Série B	35	8	9	4	3	2	—		—		47	14
Botafogo	2020	Série A	25	7	7	4	7	1	—		—		39	12
Kashiwa Reysol	2021	J1 League	8	3	—		1	0	—		2 (Note: Appearance(s) in J.League Cup)	0	11	3
Juárez (loan)	2021–22	Liga MX	7	2	—		—		—		—		7	2
Goiás (loan)	2022	Série A	34	19	11	7	5	0	—		—		50	26
Vasco da Gama	2023	Série A	12	2	11	6	2	1	—		—		25	9
Toluca	2023–24	Liga MX	15	2	—		—		—		4 (Note: Appearance(s) in Leagues Cup)	2	19	4
Ceará (loan)	2025	Série A	34	11	4	3	3	1	0	0	4 (Note: Appearance(s) in Copa do Nordeste)	2	45	17
Corinthians	2024	Série A	19	0	4	1	3	1	6 (Note: Appearance(s) in Copa Sudamericana)	1	0	0	32	3
Corinthians	2025	Série A	0	0	6	1	0	0	0	0	0	0	6	1
Corinthians	2026	Série A	18	1	8	0	4	1	10 (Note: Appearance(s) in Copa Libertadores)	0	0	0	40	2
Corinthians	Total		37	1	18	2	7	2	16	1	0	0	78	6
Career total			231	59	62	26	28	7	16	1	21	6	358	99

== Honours ==
=== Clubs ===
Atlético Goianiense

- Campeonato Goiano: 2019

Ceará

- Campeonato Cearense: 2025

Corinthians

- Campeonato Paulista: 2025
- Supercopa do Brasil: 2026

=== Individual ===
- Campeonato Brasileiro Série A Team of the Year: 2022
