= Raphael Laruccia =

Brazilian football coach (born 1985)

Personal information
- Full name: Raphael Laruccia
- Date of birth: 16 May 1985 (age 41)
- Place of birth: São Paulo, Brazil

Team information
- Current team: Portuguesa (assistant)

Youth career
- Years: Team
- Guarulhos
- Portuguesa

Managerial career
- 2017: Taboão da Serra U15
- 2018: Guarulhos U15
- 2018–2020: Flamengo-SP U20
- 2020: Flamengo-SP
- 2021–2022: Flamengo-SP U20
- 2022–2024: Avaí U20
- 2024: Corinthians U17
- 2024: Corinthians U20
- 2024: Corinthians (interim)
- 2024–2025: Corinthians U17
- 2026–: Portuguesa (assistant)

Raphael Laruccia (born 16 May 1985) is a Brazilian football coach, currently the assistant coach of Portuguesa.

== Career ==
Born in São Paulo, Laruccia played for Guarulhos and Portuguesa as a youth but subsequently retired. He worked with the under-15 sides of Taboão da Serra and Guarulhos before joining Flamengo-SP as an under-20 coach in October 2018.

On 6 February 2020, Laruccia was announced as head coach of Flamengo's first team for the year's Campeonato Paulista Segunda Divisão. He returned to the under-20s for the 2021 season, before moving to Avaí in May 2022; initially an assistant coach of the under-20 squad, he became the head coach of the category just months later.

In September 2023, Laruccia was named in charge of the under-21 squad of Avaí which was playing in the year's Copa Santa Catarina. On 1 February 2024, he left the club to join Corinthians' under-17 team.

On 23 June 2024, Laruccia was named head coach of the under-20 side of Timão. On 2 July, he was named interim head coach of the main squad, replacing sacked António Oliveira.

Laruccia's first professional match in charge occurred on 4 July 2024, a 3–2 home win over Vitória. He subsequently returned to the under-17 team, before becoming the assistant of Fábio Matias at Portuguesa on 15 December 2025.
