= Olé Brasil Futebol Clube =

Olé Brasil
- Full name: Olé Brasil Futebol Clube
- Nickname: Olé
- Founded: 21 September 2006; 19 years ago
- Ground: Estádio Palma Travassos
- Capacity: 17,360
- President: Eduardo Zanello
- 2015: Paulistão 2ª Divisão, 14th of 30
| Home colors | Away colors |

Olé Brasil Futebol Clube, usually known as Olé Brasil, is a currently inactive Brazilian football club based in Ribeirão Preto, a city in the state of São Paulo.

== History ==
The club was founded on September 21, 2006 by entrepreneurs Eduardo Zanello, Fabrício Zanello, and Fernando Sólon. Olé Brasil Futebol Clube is the third club to be founded in Ribeirão Preto after Botafogo and Comercial. The new club would debut in 2009 in Campeonato Paulista Segunda Divisão, equivalent to the fourth division of the state.

== Competition records ==
| Year | League | Result | Competition Format |
|---|---|---|---|
| 2007- 2008 | - | - | |
| 2009 | Série B | Eliminated in 1st stage | 1st stage: 6 groups of 8; 2nd stage: 6 groups of 4; 3rd stage:3 groups of 4; 4th stage:2 groups of 4; 5th stage: Final |
| 2010 | Série B | Eliminated in 3rd stage | 1st stage: 6 groups of 8; 2nd stage: 6 groups of 4; 3rd stage:3 groups of 4; 4th stage:2 groups of 4; 5th stage: Final |
| 2011 | Série B | in 1st stage | 1st stage: 6 groups of 8; 2nd stage: 6 groups of 4; 3rd stage:3 groups of 4; 4th stage:2 groups of 4; 5th stage: Final |

== Mascot ==
Picolé

The club's mascot is a penguin, the symbol of the city. The mascot is called Picolé, and wears the club's home kit.
