= Vitor Meer =

Brazilian footballer (born 2004)

Personal information
- Full name: Vitor Alves Meer
- Date of birth: 21 June 2004 (age 22)
- Place of birth: Itaquaquecetuba, Brazil
- Height: 1.80 m (5 ft 11 in)
- Position: Left-back

Team information
- Current team: Iraklis (on loan from APOEL)
- Number: 3

Youth career
- 2020: Capivariano
- 2021-2024: Corinthians

Senior career*
Years	Team	Apps	(Gls)
2020	Capivariano	1	(0)
2024	Corinthians	0	(0)
2024–	APOEL	26	(0)
2026–	→ Iraklis (loan)	4	(0)
- * Club domestic league appearances and goals as of 19 September 2026

Vitor Alves Meer (born 21 June 2004), known as Vitor Meer, is a Brazilian professional footballer who plays as a left-back for Super League Greece club Iraklis, on loan from Cypriot side APOEL.

== Career ==
Born in Itaquaquecetuba, in the state of São Paulo, Vítor was a product of Capivariano's academy and was promoted to the senior squad in 2020. Despite the step up, first-team opportunities were scarce: his only outing of the campaign came in the Campeonato Paulista Série A3, where he was on the losing side in a 3–0 reverse against EC São Bernardo. With regular minutes proving hard to come by, Vítor left Capivariano after a year at senior level and joined SC Corinthians Paulista (youth)'s under-17 setup in 2021, where he would go on to compete in both the Campeonato Brasileiro Sub-17 and the Campeonato Paulista Sub-17.

=== APOEL ===
In 2024 June, Vitor Meer, agreed terms on his departure from the club and joined APOEL. The deal involved no transfer fee, although Corinthians retained 30% of the player's economic rights, with the remaining 70% going to APOEL.

=== Loan to Iraklis ===
On 31 July 2026, APOEL announced that Meer had joined Greek club Iraklis Thessalonikis on a season-long loan until the end of the 2026–27 campaign.

== Career statistics ==
As of match played 31 July 2026

Appearances and goals by club, season and competition
Club	Season	League			State League		Cup		Continental		Other		Total	
Club	Season	Division	Apps	Goals	Apps	Goals	Apps	Goals	Apps	Goals	Apps	Goals	Apps	Goals
Capivariano	2020	Paulista Série A3	—		1	0	—		—		—		1	0
Corinthians	2023	Série A	—		—		—		—		—		0	0
Corinthians	2024	Série A	—		—		—		—		—		0	0
APOEL FC	2024–25	Cypriot First Division	—		3	0	1	0	—		—		4	0
APOEL FC	2024–25	Cypriot First Division	—		18	0	4	1	—		—		22	1
APOEL FC	Total		—		21	0	5	1	—		—		26	1
Iraklis (loan)	2026–27	Superleague Greece	—		0	0	0	0	—		—		0	0
Career total			0	22	0	5	1	0	0	0	0	0	27	1

== Honours ==
Corinthians

- Campeonato Brasileiro Sub-17: 2021
- Copa São Paulo de Futebol Júnior: 2024

APOEL

- Cypriot Super Cup: 2024
