= Rodrigo Garro =

Argentine footballer (born 1998)

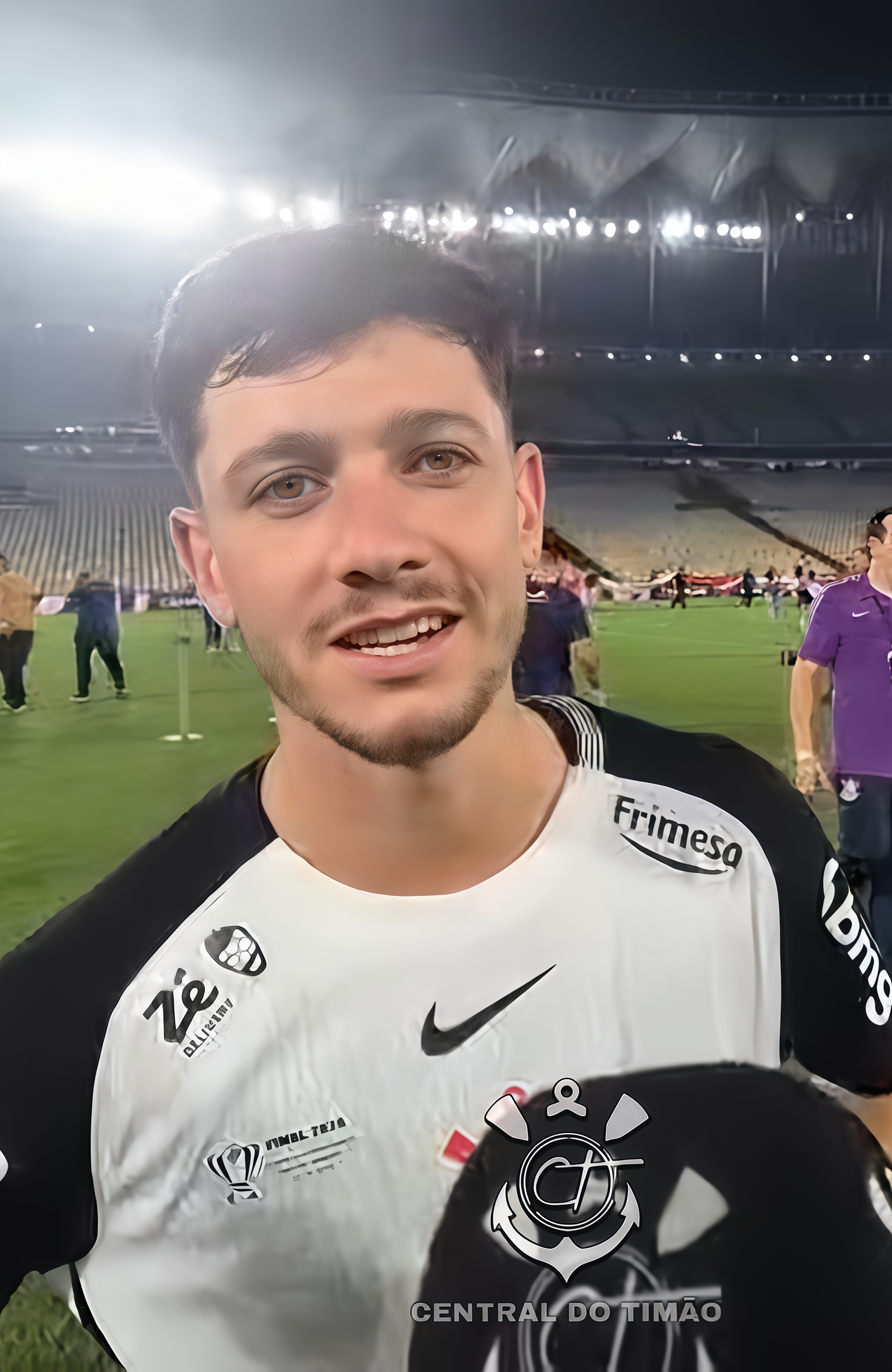
- Garro playing for Corinthians in 2025

Personal information
- Date of birth: 4 January 1998 (age 28)
- Place of birth: Santa Rosa, Argentina
- Height: 1.74 m (5 ft 9 in)
- Position: Attacking midfielder

Team information
- Current team: Corinthians
- Number: 8

Youth career
- 2011–2014: Fundación Leo Messi
- 2014–2017: Atlético de Rafaela
- 2017–2018: Instituto

Senior career*
Years	Team	Apps	(Gls)
2018–2021	Instituto	59	(7)
2022–2023	Talleres	69	(10)
2024–	Corinthians	105	(15)
- * Club domestic league appearances and goals as of 5 November 2026 (UTC) ‡ National team caps and goals as of 16:37, 17 April 2020

Rodrigo Garro (born 4 January 1998) is an Argentine professional footballer who plays as an attacking midfielder for Campeonato Brasileiro Série A club Corinthians.

== Career ==
=== Instituto ===
Garro started out with Fundación Leo Messi, an academy sponsored by Lionel Messi, spending three years with them before joining Atlético de Rafaela's academy in 2014 and subsequently Instituto's in 2017. He made his opening appearances in professional football in February 2018, starting Primera B Nacional encounters against Villa Dálmine, Gimnasia y Esgrima and Los Andes as the club reached the promotion play-offs in 2017–18; though lost out to Sarmiento.

=== Talleres ===
In January 2022, Garro joined Argentine Primera División club Talleres de Córdoba on a deal until the end of 2025. An immediate starter, he scored nine goals overall with the club during the 2023 season.

=== Corinthians ===
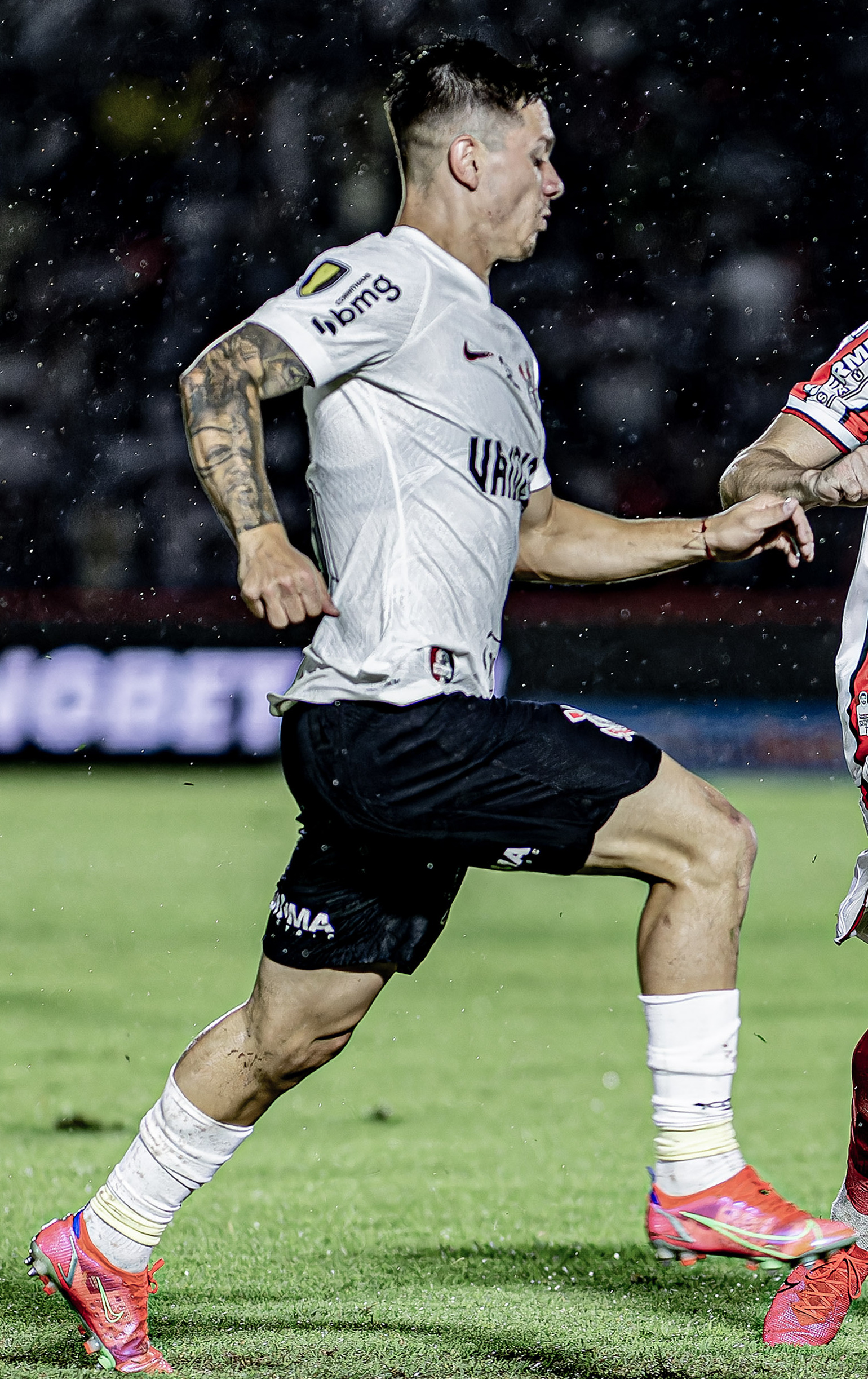
Garro in action for Corinthians in 2024

On 2 January 2024, Garro was announced at Campeonato Brasileiro Série A side Corinthians on a four-year contract.

== Career statistics ==
As of match played 5 November 2026

Appearances and goals by club, season and competition
Club	Season	League			State league (Note: Includes Campeonato Paulista)		National cup (Note: Includes Copa Argentina, Copa do Brasil)		Continental		Other		Total	
Club	Season	Division	Apps	Goals	Apps	Goals	Apps	Goals	Apps	Goals	Apps	Goals	Apps	Goals
Instituto	2017–18	Primera Nacional	3	0	—		0	0	—		—		3	0
Instituto	2018–19	Primera Nacional	4	0	—		0	0	—		—		4	0
Instituto	2019–20	Primera Nacional	13	2	—		1	0	—		—		14	2
Instituto	2020	Primera Nacional	8	0	—		0	0	—		—		8	0
Instituto	2021	Primera Nacional	31	5	—		0	0	—		—		31	5
Instituto	Total		59	7	—		1	0	—		—		60	7
Talleres	2022	Primera División	29	3	—		5	0	—		—		34	3
Talleres	2023	Primera División	40	7	—		4	1	3 (Note: Appearances in Copa Libertadores)	1	—		47	9
Talleres	Total		69	10	—		9	1	3	1	—		81	12
Corinthians	2024	Série A	36	10	6	1	9	0	11 (Note: Appearances in Copa Sudamericana)	2	—		62	13
Corinthians	2025	Série A	19	0	6	1	8	1	5	0	—		38	2
Corinthians	2026	Série A	31	3	7	0	3	0	10 (Note: Appearances in Copa Libertadores)	0	1 (Note: Appearance in Supercopa do Brasil)	0	52	3
Corinthians	Total		86	13	19	2	20	1	26	2	1	0	152	18
Career total			214	30	19	2	30	2	29	3	1	0	293	37

== Honours ==
Corinthians

- Copa do Brasil: 2025
- Campeonato Paulista: 2025
- Supercopa do Brasil: 2026

Individual

- Argentine Primera División Team of the Season: 2023
- Campeonato Brasileiro Série A Team of the Year: 2024
- Prêmio Craque da Galera: 2024
- Bola de Prata: 2024
- Troféu Mesa Redonda Best Foreign Player: 2024
