= Thiago Kosloski =

Brazilian football manager (born 1981)

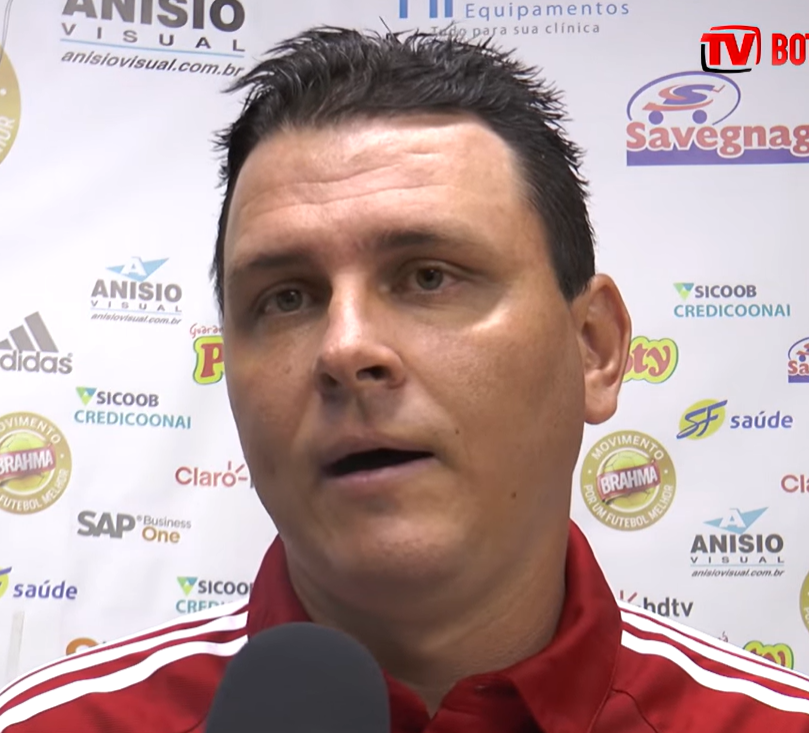
- Kosloski in 2015

Personal information
- Full name: Thiago Kosloski
- Date of birth: 16 May 1981 (age 45)
- Place of birth: Telêmaco Borba, Brazil
- Position: Full back

Team information
- Current team: Peru U20 (head coach)

Senior career*
Years	Team	Apps	(Gls)
1998	PSTC		
1999	Telêmaco Borba		
- Operário Ferroviário
- Londrina
- Grêmio Barueri
2004	Botafogo-SP		
2005	Rio Branco-PR		
2006	Grêmio Coariense		
2007	Al Ahed		
2008	Cianorte		
2008	Vilhena		
2008–2009	Penapolense		

Managerial career
- 2009: Olé Brasil U17
- 2010: Olé Brasil U20
- 2010: Olé Brasil
- 2011: Astana-1964
- 2012: Bayterek
- 2014: Atlético Pernambucano
- 2016–2018: Botafogo-SP U20
- 2018–2020: SWQ Thunder
- 2020: Vasco da Gama (assistant)
- 2020: CRB (assistant)
- 2021: Vitória (assistant)
- 2022: Chapecoense (assistant)
- 2022–2023: Coritiba U20
- 2022–2023: Brazil U20 (assistant)
- 2023: Coritiba (assistant)
- 2023: Brazil (assistant)
- 2023: Coritiba (interim)
- 2023: Coritiba
- 2024: Corinthians (assistant)
- 2024: Corinthians (interim)
- 2024–2025: Brazil U20 (assistant)
- 2025: Grêmio (assistant)
- 2026–: Peru U20
- * Club domestic league appearances and goals

Thiago Kosloski (born 16 May 1981) is a Brazilian football coach and former player who played as a full back. He is the current head coach of the Peru national under-20 team.

== Playing career ==
Born in Telêmaco Borba, Paraná, Kosloski began his career with PSTC in 1998. He won the Campeonato Paranaense Série Bronze with Telêmaco Borba in the following year, and later played for Operário Ferroviário, Londrina, Grêmio Barueri, Botafogo-SP, Rio Branco-PR and Grêmio Coariense before signing for Lebanese side Al Ahed in 2007.

Back to his home country in 2008, Kosloski represented Cianorte, Vilhena and Penapolense, retiring with the latter in 2009 at the age of 29.

== Coaching career ==
Shortly after retiring, Kosloski began his coaching career in charge of Olé Brasil's under-17 team. In the following year, he after being in charge of the under-20 team, he became head coach of the main squad in the 2010 Campeonato Paulista Segunda Divisão in July.

In November 2011, Kosloski moved to Kazakhstan and was appointed manager of FC Astana-1964. He left the country on 5 April 2012 after not having a license, but returned late in the month to take over FC Bayterek.

Back to Brazil, Kosloski worked as a youth coordinator at Botafogo-SP, and was also the head coach of Atlético Pernambucano in the 2014 Campeonato Pernambucano Série A2, before taking over Botafogo's under-20 team in November 2015. In October 2018, he moved to Australia and became SWQ Thunder's coach.

On 10 April 2020, Kosloski was announced as Ramon Menezes' assistant at Vasco da Gama. He followed Ramon to CRB and Vitória, before becoming Felipe Conceição's assistant at Chapecoense.

Kosloski announced his departure from Chape on 17 February 2022, and moved to Coritiba shortly after, as an under-20 coach. In May, he was also appointed assistant of the Brazil national under-20 team, managed by Ramon.

In March 2023, Kosloski was a part of Ramon's staff at the Brazil national team for a short period. On 27 June of that year, he was named permanent assistant coach of Coxa, being also appointed interim head coach after the dismissal of Antônio Carlos Zago.

On 31 July 2023, Coritiba announced that Kosloski as head coach of the first team, on a contract until December 2024. He was sacked on 27 November, after the club's relegation was confirmed.

On 3 January 2024, Kosloski was named assistant of Mano Menezes at Corinthians, and became an interim on 5 February, after Mano was sacked. Four days later, however, he was dismissed from the club.

== Managerial statistics ==
As of 8 February 2024

Managerial record by team and tenure
Team	Nat.	From	To	Record								Ref
Team	Nat.	From	To	G	W	D	L	GF	GA	GD	Win %	Ref
Olé Brasil	(Brazil)	7 July 2010	October 2010	16	8	4	4	23	13	+10	50.00	
Atlético Pernambucano	(Brazil)	May 2014	October 2014	21	8	9	4	30	25	+5	38.10	
Vasco da Gama (interim)	(Brazil)	19 September 2020	23 September 2020	2	0	1	1	0	1	−1	0.00	
Coritiba (interim)	(Brazil)	27 June 2023	30 July 2023	5	3	1	1	8	6	+2	60.00	
Coritiba	(Brazil)	31 July 2023	27 November 2023	19	5	0	14	23	38	−15	26.32	
Corinthians (interim)	(Brazil)	5 February 2024	9 February 2024	1	0	0	1	0	1	−1	0.00	
Career total				64	24	15	25	84	84	+0	37.50	—

== Honours ==
=== Player ===
Telêmaco Borba

- Campeonato Paranaense Série Bronze: 1999
