= Cristina Garros Martínez =

Argentine judge

Cristina Garros Martínez was the first woman judge in the Court of Justice in Salta, Argentina, where she served from 2000 to 2012. Graciela Kauffman de Martinelli replaced her when she retired in February 2018.
