= Roland Garros =

Roland Garros may refer to:

- Roland-Garros, commonly called the French Open, one of four major tennis tournaments
- Roland Garros (aviator) (1888–1918), French aviator and World War I fighter pilot
- Stade Roland Garros, a tennis stadium complex in Paris
- Roland Garros Airport, an airport in Saint-Denis, Réunion island, Indian Ocean, France
