= Sebastián de Garro =

Basque nobleman, viscount and lord (1400s–1500s)

Sebastian Garro y Sidrac
- Viscount of Zolina, Lord of Rocafort and Sidrac
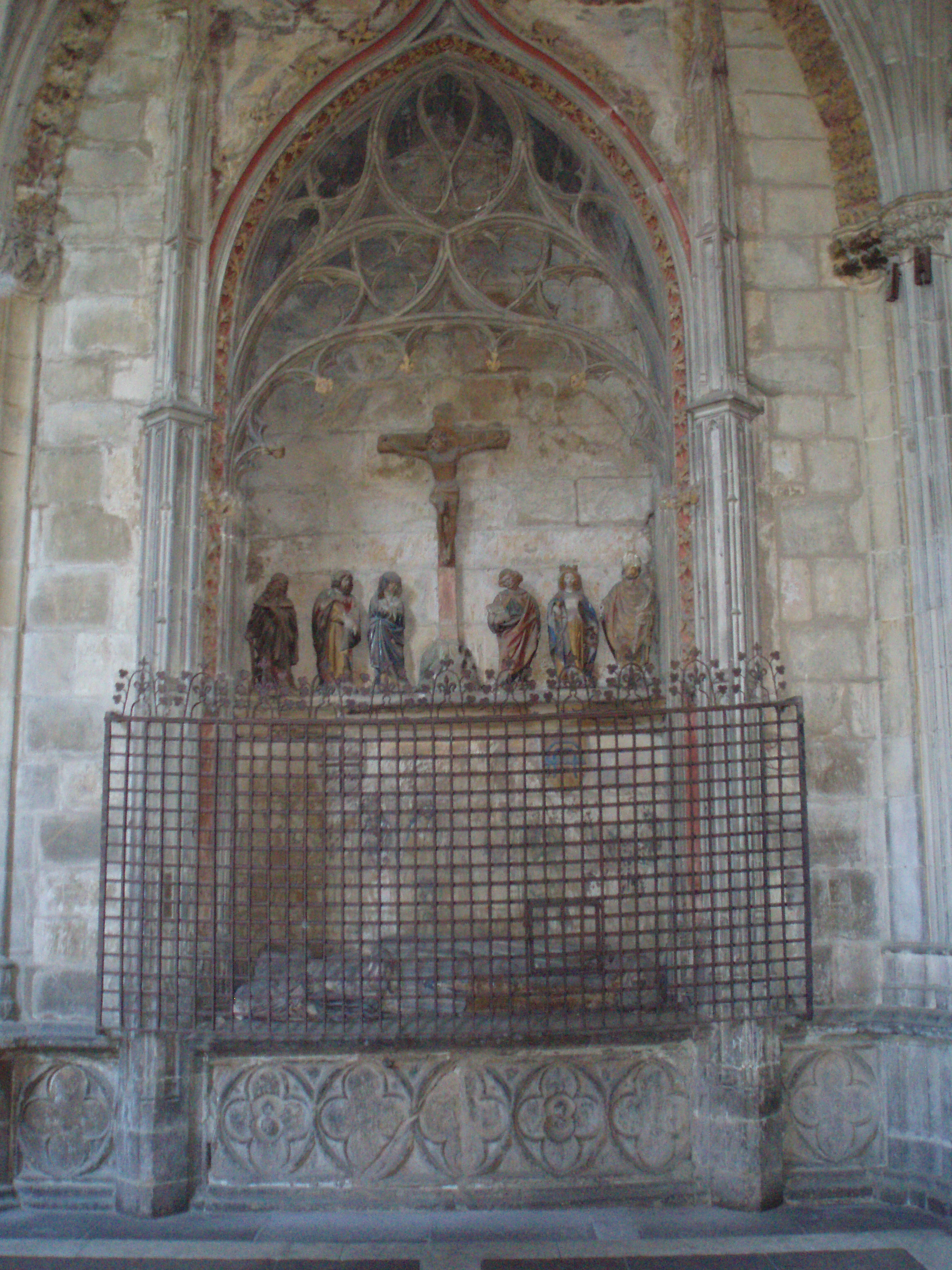
- Grave of Garro's family
- Born: 15th Century; Navarra, Kingdom of Navarre
- Baptised: Pamplona Cathedral
- Died: 16th Century; Navarra, Kingdom of Navarre
- Noble family: Garro's
- Spouse: María de Gongora

Sebastian Garro y Sidrac (14??–15??) was a Basque nobleman, Viscount of Zolina, Lord of Rocafort and Sidrac.

== Biography ==
Sebastian Garro was born in Navarra, son of a noble family. He was married to María de Gongora, daughter of an eminent Spanish family, descendants of the Marquises of Góngora. Garro was a possible descended of Pere Arnaut de Garro, a noble knight, who served in the court of Charles II of Navarre.
