= António Oliveira (footballer, born 1982) =

Portuguese footballer

Personal information
- Full name: António José Cardoso de Oliveira
- Date of birth: 9 October 1982 (age 44)
- Place of birth: Lisbon, Portugal
- Height: 1.85 m (6 ft 1 in)
- Position: Centre back

Youth career
- 1993–2001: Benfica

Senior career*
Years	Team	Apps	(Gls)
2001–2003	Benfica B		
2003–2004	Braga B	18	(0)
2004–2005	Santa Clara	6	(0)
2005–2006	Casa Pia	2	(0)
2006–2010	Oriental		
2010–2011	Fabril Barreiro	8	(1)

Managerial career
- 2013–2014: Oeiras (youth)
- 2014: Tractor Sazi (assistant)
- 2015: Tractor Sazi (assistant)
- 2017: Rudar Velenje (assistant)
- 2017–2019: Kazma
- 2020: Santos (assistant)
- 2020–2021: Athletico Paranaense (assistant)
- 2021: Athletico Paranaense U23
- 2021: Athletico Paranaense
- 2022: Benfica B
- 2022: Cuiabá
- 2023: Coritiba
- 2023–2024: Cuiabá
- 2024: Corinthians
- 2025: Sport Recife
- 2025: Remo
- * Club domestic league appearances and goals

António José Cardoso de Oliveira (born 9 October 1982), sometimes known as Toni, is a Portuguese football manager and former player who played as a central defender.

== Playing career ==
Born in Lisbon, Toni was a Benfica youth graduate. He made his senior debut with the reserves in the 2001–02 season, in Segunda Divisão B.

In July 2004, after a one-year spell at Braga B, Toni signed for Segunda Liga side Santa Clara. He made his professional debut on 18 September, coming on as a second-half substitute for Kali in a 1–3 away loss against Varzim

After being rarely used, Toni subsequently represented Casa Pia, Oriental and Fabril Barreiro, retiring with the latter in 2011 at the age of just 29.

== Coaching career ==
=== Early career ===
In late January 2014, after being a coach of Oeiras' under-19 squad, Oliveira moved to Iran to join his father's staff at Tractor Sazi In January 2017, he was named Vanja Radinović's assistant at Rudar Velenje.

In 2017, Oliveira rejoined his father's staff, now at Kazma. Both left the club in 2019.

In December 2019, Oliveira became Jesualdo Ferreira's assistant at Santos of the Campeonato Brasileiro Série A. He was offered to stay at the club after being acting as head coach of the under-23 squad, but left with Jesualdo nonetheless.

=== Athletico Paranaense ===
On 22 October 2020, Oliveira was appointed assistant coach of Paulo Autuori at Athletico Paranaense. The following 6 February, he was named coach of the under-23 squad for the 2021 Campeonato Paranaense.

On 13 March 2021, Oliveira was named coach of Athletico's first team, with Bruno Lazaroni taking his previous role. He resigned on 9 September, after six winless matches.

=== Benfica B ===
On 5 January 2022, Oliveira was appointed manager of Benfica B, until the end of the 2021–22 season. He left the side in May, as his contract would not be renewed.

=== Cuiabá ===
On 2 June 2022, Oliveira agreed to return to Brazil, and was named head coach of Cuiabá in the top tier. He left the club at the end of the season, after not renewing his contract.

=== Coritiba ===
On 13 December 2022, Oliveira took over fellow top tier side Coritiba. He was dismissed by Coxa on 18 April 2023, after a poor campaign in the 2023 Campeonato Paranaense and a 3–0 loss to Flamengo in the league opener.

=== Return to Cuiabá ===
On 13 May 2023, Oliveira returned to his previous club Cuiabá, replacing compatriot Ivo Vieira. He was awarded the 2023 Campeonato Brasileiro Série A head coach of the month in July.

=== Corinthians ===
On 9 February 2024, Cuiabá announced that Oliveira had left the club to join Corinthians, as his new side paid a R$ 1.04 million release clause. He was sacked on 2 July, after a 2–0 loss to rivals Palmeiras.

=== Sport Recife ===
On 9 May 2025, after nearly one year without a club, Oliveira returned to Brazil and its first division, after being appointed head coach of Sport Recife. On 4 June, after four winless matches, he was sacked.

=== Remo ===
On 19 June 2025, Oliveira agreed to become the head coach of Remo. He was dismissed on 22 September, after just 14 matches.

== Personal life ==
Oliveira's father, also named António, was also a footballer. A midfielder, he had his career mainly associated to Benfica. His son, also António, was also a midfielder, but only played youth football and notably represented Casa Pia.

== Managerial statistics ==
As of 25 September 2025

Managerial record by team and tenure
Team	Nat.	From	To	Record								Ref
Team	Nat.	From	To	G	W	D	L	GF	GA	GD	Win %	Ref
Athletico Paranaense (interim)	(Brazil)	20 February 2021	25 February 2021	2	1	0	1	2	1	+1	50.00	
Athletico Paranaense U23	(Brazil)	26 February 2021	13 March 2021	1	0	0	1	0	1	−1	0.00	
Athletico Paranaense	(Brazil)	13 March 2021	9 September 2021	39	20	7	12	52	35	+17	51.28	
Benfica B	(Portugal)	5 January 2022	13 May 2022	18	7	3	8	28	26	+2	38.89	
Cuiabá	(Brazil)	6 June 2022	5 December 2022	28	7	9	12	23	30	−7	25.00	
Coritiba	(Brazil)	13 December 2022	18 April 2023	15	7	5	3	20	16	+4	46.67	
Cuiabá	(Brazil)	13 May 2023	9 February 2024	36	15	10	11	46	32	+14	41.67	
Corinthians	(Brazil)	9 February 2024	2 July 2024	29	12	9	8	43	25	+18	41.38	
Sport Recife	(Brazil)	9 May 2025	4 June 2025	4	0	1	3	1	8	−7	0.00	
Remo	(Brazil)	16 June 2025	22 September 2025	14	4	6	4	12	12	+0	28.57	
Career total				186	73	50	63	227	186	+41	39.25	—

== Honours ==
=== Manager ===
Individual

- Campeonato Brasileiro Série A Manager of the Month: July 2023
