= 2026 Red Bull Bragantino season =

Red Bull Bragantino
2026 season
- Manager: Vágner Mancini
- Stadium: Estádio Cícero de Souza Marques
- Campeonato Brasileiro Série A: 9th
- Campeonato Paulista: Quarter-finals
- Copa do Brasil: Fifth round
- Copa Sudamericana: Round of 16
- Top goalscorer: League: Lucas Barbosa (7); All: Isidro Pitta (9)
- Biggest win: Red Bull Bragantino 5–0 Botafogo-SP
- Biggest defeat: Corinthians 2–0 Red Bull Bragantino; Bahia 2–0 Red Bull Bragantino
Home colours

In the 2026 season, Red Bull Bragantino competes in the Campeonato Brasileiro Série A, the Campeonato Paulista, the Copa do Brasil, and the Copa Sudamericana.

== Transfers ==
=== In ===
Pos.	Player	Transferred from	Fee	Date	Source
MF	(Uruguay) Ignacio Sosa	(Uruguay) Peñarol		1 January 2026	
DF	(Brazil) Alix Vinicius	(Brazil) Atlético Goianiense		6 January 2026	
MF	(Brazil) Rodriguinho	(Brazil) São Paulo		27 January 2026	
GK	(Brazil) Tiago Volpi	(Brazil) Grêmio		27 January 2026	
FW	(Argentina) José María Herrera	(Brazil) Fortaleza		30 January 2026	
FW	(Uruguay) Thiago Borbas	(Spain) Real Oviedo	Loan return	30 June 2026	
FW	(Brazil) Werik Popó	(Japan) Fagiano Okayama	Loan return	30 June 2026	
DF	(Brazil) Gustavo Marques	(Portugal) Benfica B	~€3,500,000	1 July 2026	
FW	(Brazil) Wallace Yan	(Brazil) Flamengo	~€6,000,000	2 September 2026	
MF	(Brazil) Patrick	(Brazil) Atlético Mineiro	Loan	11 September 2026	

=== Out ===
Pos.	Player	Transferred to	Fee	Date	Source
FW	(Uruguay) Thiago Borbas	(Spain) Real Oviedo	Loan	2 January 2026	
GK	(Brazil) Lucão	(Portugal) Gil Vicente		16 January 2026	
DF	(Brazil) Luan Cândido	(Brazil) Vitória	Loan	24 January 2026	
FW	(Brazil) Talisson	(Romania) Rapid București		27 January 2026	
MF	(Brazil) Jhon Jhon	(Russia) Zenit Saint Petersburg		28 January 2026	
MF	(Uruguay) Ignacio Laquintana	(Spain) Huesca	Loan	2 February 2026	
DF	(Brazil) Kevyn Monteiro	(Portugal) Moreirense	€175,000	1 July 2026	

== Friendlies ==
4 July 2026 Friendly	Red Bull Bragantino (São Paulo (state))	0–0	(São Paulo (state)) São Paulo	Atibaia
				Stadium: Centro de Desenvolvimento e Perfomance do Massa Bruta

11 July 2026 Friendly	Red Bull Bragantino (São Paulo (state))	2–1	(Paraná (state)) Athletico Paranaense	Bragança Paulista
10:00 UTC−3				Stadium: Estádio Cícero de Souza Marques

== Competitions ==
=== Campeonato Brasileiro Série A ===
Pos	Team	Pld	W	D	L	GF	GA	GD	Pts	Qualification or relegation
7	Atlético Mineiro	33	14	8	11	44	39	+5	50	Qualification for Copa Sudamericana group stage
8	Santos	33	12	11	10	49	47	+2	47	Qualification for Copa Sudamericana group stage
9	Red Bull Bragantino	33	12	8	13	42	38	+4	44	Qualification for Copa Sudamericana group stage
10	São Paulo	33	12	7	14	39	39	0	43	Qualification for Copa Sudamericana group stage
11	Coritiba	33	11	9	13	40	50	−10	42	Qualification for Copa Sudamericana group stage

Updated to match(es) played on 31 October 2026. Source: CBF
Rules for classification: 1) points; 2) wins; 3) goal difference; 4) goals scored; 5) head-to-head results (only between two teams); 6) fewest red cards; 7) fewest yellow cards; 8) drawing of lots.

==== Results summary ====
Overall								Home						Away					
Pld	W	D	L	GF	GA	GD	Pts	W	D	L	GF	GA	GD	W	D	L	GF	GA	GD
26	10	6	10	32	29	+3	36	6	2	5	19	14	+5	4	4	5	13	15	−2

Last updated: 12 September 2026.

==== Results by round ====
Round	1	2	3	4	5	6	7	8	9	10	11	12	13	14	15	16
Ground	A	H	A	H	A	H	A	H	H	A	A	H	H	A	A	H
Result	W	W	L	D	D	L	L	L	W	W	L	W	L	W	L	W
Position	8	1	7	7	6	10	12	14	11	9	9	8	9	7	7	6

Updated to match(es) played on 24 May 2026. Source:
A = Away; H = Home; W = Win; D = Draw; L = Loss

==== Matches ====
The schedule was released on 16 December 2025.

28 January 2026 1	Coritiba	0–1	Red Bull Bragantino	Curitiba
19:00 UTC−3

4 February 2026 2	Red Bull Bragantino	1–0	Atlético Mineiro	Bragança Paulista
19:00 UTC−3				Stadium: Estádio Cícero de Souza Marques

13 February 2026 3	Corinthians	2–0	Red Bull Bragantino
20:00 UTC−3

25 February 2026 4	Red Bull Bragantino	1–1	Athletico Paranaense	Bragança Paulista
19:00 UTC−3				Stadium: Estádio Cícero de Souza Marques

12 March 2026 5	Grêmio	1–1	Red Bull Bragantino
21:30 UTC−3

15 March 2026 6	Red Bull Bragantino	1–2	São Paulo	Bragança Paulista
20:30 UTC−3				Stadium: Estádio Cícero de Souza Marques

18 March 2026 7	Bahia	2–0	Red Bull Bragantino
19:00 UTC−3

21 March 2026 8	Red Bull Bragantino	1–2	Botafogo	Bragança Paulista
16:00 UTC−3				Stadium: Estádio Cícero de Souza Marques

2 April 2026 9	Red Bull Bragantino	3–0	Flamengo	Bragança Paulista
21:30 UTC−3				Stadium: Estádio Cícero de Souza Marques

5 April 2026 10	Mirassol	0–1	Red Bull Bragantino
20:00 UTC−3

12 April 2026 11	Cruzeiro	2–1	Red Bull Bragantino
18:30 UTC−3	Villarreal 18'; Christian 49'		Hurtado 6'

19 April 2026 12	Red Bull Bragantino	4–2	Remo	Bragança Paulista
18:30 UTC−3	Pitta 19', 37'; Tchamba 47', 51' (o.g.)		Taliari 28'; Marcelinho 39'	Stadium: Estádio Cícero de Souza Marques; Referee: Jonathan Benkenstein Pinheiro

26 April 2026 13	Red Bull Bragantino	0–1	Palmeiras	Bragança Paulista
18:30	Juninho Capixaba (yellow card) 45+4'		López 21'; Felipe Anderson (yellow card) 64'; Giay (yellow card) 78'	Stadium: Estádio Cícero de Souza Marques; Referee: João Vitor Gobi

3 May 2026 14	Chapecoense	1–2	Red Bull Bragantino	Chapecó
18:30	Ênio (yellow card) 7'; Bolasie 23'; Bruno Leonardo (yellow card) 86'		Cauê (yellow card) 33'; Gabriel 41'; Lucas Barbosa 73'; Eric Ramires (yellow card) 90+5'	Stadium: Arena Condá; Referee: Paulo Cesar Zanovelli da Silva

10 May 2026 15	Santos	2–0	Red Bull Bragantino	Santos
18:30	Neymar 45+4', (yellow card) 79'; Frías 75'		Lucas Barbosa (yellow card) 7'; Pitta (yellow card) 16'; Gabriel (yellow card) 45'; Alix Vinicius (yellow card) 75'	Stadium: Estádio Urbano Caldeira; Referee: Alex Gomes Stefano

17 May 2026 16	Red Bull Bragantino	2–0	Vitória	Bragança Paulista
18:30	Volpi 40' (pen.); Lucas Barbosa 90+9'			Stadium: Estádio Cícero de Souza Marques; Referee: Wagner do Nascimento Magalhães

24 May 2026 17	Vasco da Gama	0–3	Red Bull Bragantino	Rio de Janeiro
20:30	Gómez (yellow card) 85'		Rodriguinho (yellow card) 32', (goal) 45+1'; Mosquera (yellow card) 57'; Pitta 60'; Fernando 77'; Sasha (penalty missed) , 87; Juninho Capixaba (yellow card) 90+1'	Stadium: São Januário; Referee: Fernando Antônio Mendes de Salles Nascimento Filho

31 May 2026 18	Red Bull Bragantino	3–1	Internacional	Bragança Paulista
11:00

17 July 2026 19	Fluminense	1–1	Red Bull Bragantino
20:00

26 July 2026 20	Red Bull Bragantino	0–0	Coritiba	Bragança Paulista
18:30

9 August 2026 22	Red Bull Bragantino	0–2	Corinthians	Bragança Paulista
18:30

15 August 2026 23	Athletico Paranaense	1–1	Red Bull Bragantino
18:30

23 August 2026 24	Red Bull Bragantino	1–0	Grêmio	Bragança Paulista
16:00

29 August 2026 25	São Paulo	2–1	Red Bull Bragantino
20:00

5 September 2026 26	Red Bull Bragantino	2–3	Bahia	Bragança Paulista
16:00

12 September 2026 27	Botafogo	1–1	Red Bull Bragantino	Rio de Janeiro
20:30				Stadium: Estádio Olímpico Nilton Santos

20 September 2026 28	Flamengo	2–1	Red Bull Bragantino
18:30

3 October 2026 21	Atlético Mineiro	1–0	Red Bull Bragantino
18:30		Report		Referee: Lucas Casagrande

7 October 2026 29	Red Bull Bragantino	1–1	Mirassol
19:30		Report		Referee: Raphael Claus

12 October 2026 30	Red Bull Bragantino	4–2	Cruzeiro
21:00		Report		Referee: Savio Pereira Sampaio

18 October 2026 31	Remo	1–1	Red Bull Bragantino
19:30

24 October 2026 32	Palmeiras	2–0	Red Bull Bragantino
18:30

28 October 2026 33	Red Bull Bragantino	3–0	Chapecoense
19:30

2 November 2026 34	Red Bull Bragantino	v	Santos	Bragança Paulista
20:00		Report		Stadium: Estádio Cícero de Souza Marques; Referee: Edina Alves Batista

=== Campeonato Paulista ===
11 January 2026 1	Noroeste	0–1	Red Bull Bragantino
18:15 UTC−3

15 January 2026 2	Red Bull Bragantino	3–0	Corinthians
19:30 UTC−3

18 January 2026 3	Red Bull Bragantino	5–0	Botafogo-SP
18:15 UTC−3

21 January 2026 4	Mirassol	0–0	Red Bull Bragantino
20:00 UTC−3

25 January 2026 5	Santos	0–0	Red Bull Bragantino
16:00 UTC−3

1 February 2026 6	Red Bull Bragantino	1–1	São Bernardo
18:15 UTC−3

8 February 2026 7	Velo Clube	1–1	Red Bull Bragantino
18:30 UTC−3

15 February 2026 8	Red Bull Bragantino	3–0	Novorizontino
20:30 UTC−3

==== Quarter-finals ====
21 February 2026	Red Bull Bragantino	1–2	São Paulo
18:30 UTC−3

=== Copa do Brasil ===
==== Fifth round ====
22 April 2026 First leg	Red Bull Bragantino	1–1	Mirassol	Bragança Paulista
21:30	Lucas Barbosa 7'		Neto Moura 45+3'	Stadium: Estádio Cícero de Souza Marques; Referee: Wagner do Nascimento Magalhães

13 May 2026 Second leg	Mirassol	2–1 (3–2 agg.)	Red Bull Bragantino	Mirassol
20:30				Stadium: Estádio José Maria de Campos Maia; Referee: Rafael Rodrigo Klein

=== Copa Sudamericana ===
==== Group stage ====
The draw was held on 19 March 2026.

Pos	Team	Pld	W	D	L	GF	GA	GD	Pts	Qualification
1	(Argentina) River Plate	6	4	2	0	9	3	+6	14	Advance to round of 16
2	(Brazil) Red Bull Bragantino	6	3	1	2	12	5	+7	10	Advance to knockout round play-offs
3	(Venezuela) Carabobo	6	3	0	3	6	5	+1	9	
4	(Bolivia) Blooming	6	0	1	5	3	17	−14	1	

Source: CONMEBOL
Rules for classification: 1) Points; 2) Head-to-head points; 3) Head-to-head goal difference; 4) Head-to-head goals scored; 5) Goal difference; 6) Goals scored; 7) Red cards; 8) Yellow cards; 9) Drawing of lots.

9 April 2026 1	Carabobo (Venezuela)	1–0	(Brazil) Red Bull Bragantino	Valencia, Venezuela
20:30 UTC−4	Neira 9'			Stadium: Estadio Misael Delgado; Referee: Hernán Heras (Uruguay)

16 April 2026 2	Red Bull Bragantino (Brazil)	3–2	(Bolivia) Blooming	Bragança Paulista
21:30 UTC−3	Fernando 17' (pen.); Sosa (yellow card) 37' (yellow-red card) 51'; Vinicinho (yellow card) 49'; Pitta 65', 90+6'; Marcelinho (yellow card) 77'	Report	Bejarano (yellow card) 38'; Hinojosa 45+1'; Villarroel 54' (pen.); Valverde (yellow card) 57'; Gimenez (yellow card) 62' (yellow-red card) 62'	Stadium: Estádio Cícero de Souza Marques; Referee: Carlos Paul Benitez Achar (Paraguay)

30 April 2026 3	Red Bull Bragantino (Brazil)	0–1	(Argentina) River Plate	Bragança Paulista
21:30	Matheus Fernandes (yellow card) 10'; Sasha (yellow card) 18', (penalty missed) 53; Alix Vinicius (yellow card) 36' (yellow-red card) 59'; Girotto Franco (yellow card) 55'; Gustavinho (yellow card) 56'		Subiabre (yellow card) 22'; Cruz Meza (yellow card) 41'; Martínez Quarta (yellow card) 47', (goal) 90+3'; Rivero (yellow card) 90+8'	Stadium: Estádio Cícero de Souza Marques; Referee: Wilmar Roldán (Colombia)

7 May 2026 4	Blooming (Bolivia)	0–6	(Brazil) Red Bull Bragantino	Santa Cruz de la Sierra, Bolivia
20:30			Rodriguinho 5', 61'; Gustavinho 11'; Sasha 45'; Gustavo Marques 49'; Fernando 59'	Stadium: Estadio Ramón Tahuichi Aguilera; Referee: Augusto Menéndez (Peru)

20 May 2026 5	River Plate (Argentina)	1–1	(Brazil) Red Bull Bragantino	Buenos Aires, Argentina
21:30				Stadium: Estadio Monumental; Referee: Gustavo Tejera (Uruguay)

27 May 2026 6	Red Bull Bragantino (Brazil)	2–0	(Venezuela) Carabobo
21:30
