= 2025 SE Palmeiras season =

Palmeiras
2025 season
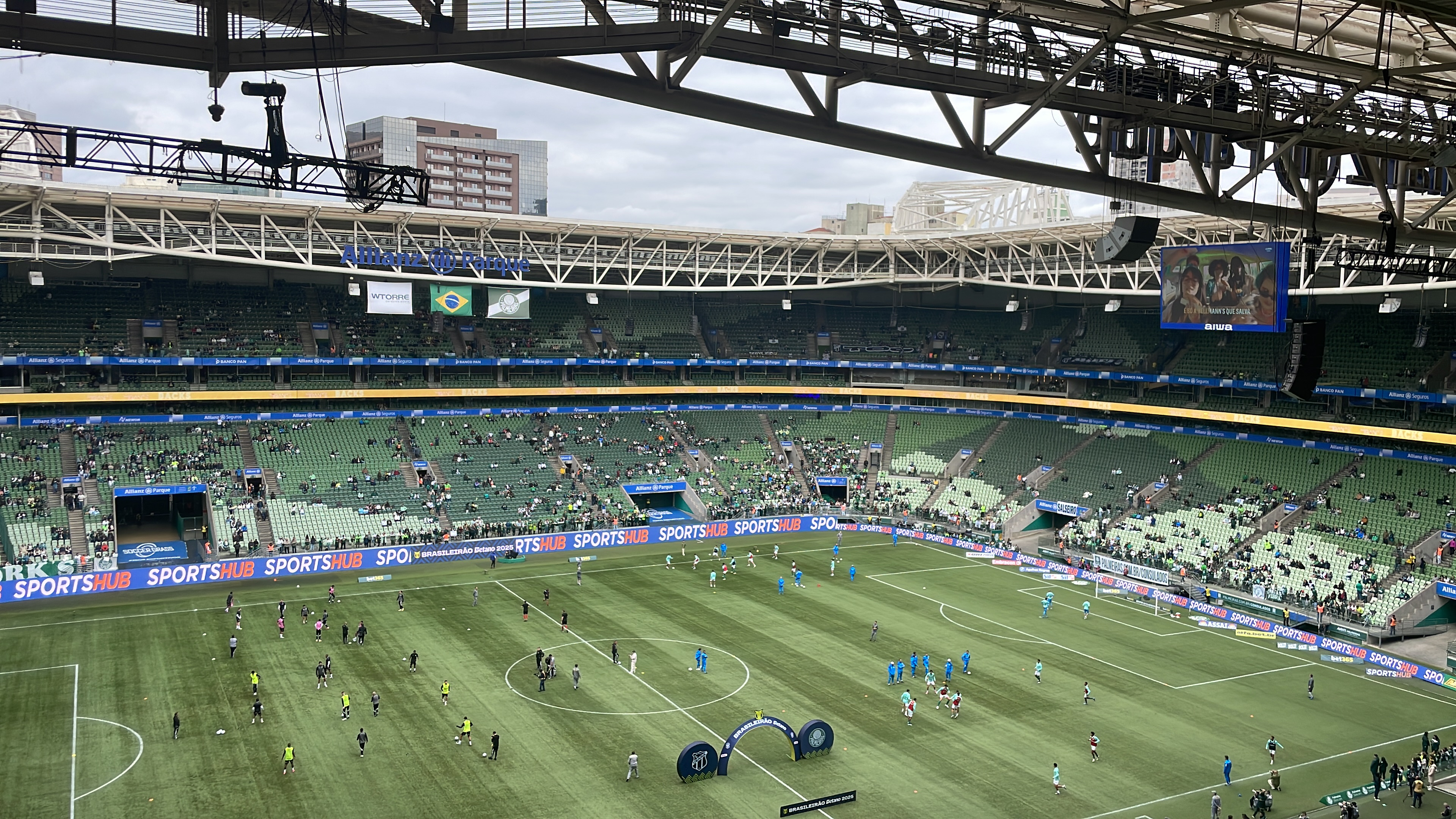
- Match between Palmeiras vs. Ceará on 10 August 2025.
- President: Leila Pereira
- Coach: Abel Ferreira
- Stadium: Allianz Parque
- Série A: 2nd
- Campeonato Paulista: Runners-up
- Copa Libertadores: Runners-up
- Copa do Brasil: Round of 16
- FIFA Club World Cup: Quarter-finals
- Top goalscorer: League: Vitor Roque (16 goals); All: José Manuel López (25 goals)
- Highest home attendance: 41,468 (vs. Corinthians – 6 August 2025)
- Lowest home attendance: 10,135 (vs. Novorizontino – 25 January 2025)
- Average home league attendance: 34,947
Home colors	Away colors	Third colors

The 2025 season was the 111th in Sociedade Esportiva Palmeiras' existence. This season Palmeiras participated in the Campeonato Paulista, Copa Libertadores, Copa do Brasil, Série A and FIFA Club World Cup.

== Squad information ==
Note: Flags indicate national team as defined under FIFA eligibility rules; some limited exceptions apply. Players may hold more than one non-FIFA nationality.

No.	Pos.	Nation	Player
1	GK	BRA	Carlos Miguel
3	DF	BRA	Bruno Fuchs (on loan from Atlético Mineiro)
4	DF	ARG	Agustín Giay
5	MF	ARG	Aníbal Moreno
6	DF	BRA	Jefté
7	MF	BRA	Felipe Anderson
8	MF	BRA	Andreas Pereira
9	FW	BRA	Vitor Roque
10	FW	BRA	Paulinho
11	FW	BRA	Bruno Rodrigues
12	DF	BRA	Khellven
13	DF	BRA	Micael
14	GK	BRA	Marcelo Lomba
15	DF	PAR	Gustavo Gómez (captain)
17	FW	URU	Facundo Torres

No.	Pos.	Nation	Player
18	MF	BRA	Maurício
19	FW	PAR	Ramón Sosa
21	GK	BRA	Weverton
22	DF	URU	Joaquín Piquerez
23	MF	BRA	Raphael Veiga
24	GK	BRA	Aranha
26	DF	BRA	Murilo
30	MF	BRA	Lucas Evangelista
31	FW	BRA	Luighi
32	MF	URU	Emiliano Martínez
38	MF	BRA	Figueiredo
40	MF	BRA	Allan
42	FW	ARG	José Manuel López
43	DF	BRA	Benedetti

=== Transfers ===
==== Transfers in ====
Pos.	Player	Transferred from	Fee/notes	Date	Source
FW	(Uruguay) Facundo Torres	(United States) Orlando City SC	$12,000,000	20 December 2024	
MF	(Colombia) Eduard Atuesta	(United States) Los Angeles FC	Loan return.	31 December 2024	
FW	(Brazil) Paulinho	(Brazil) Atlético Mineiro	R$115,000,000	31 December 2024	
MF	(Brazil) Allan	Youth system	Promoted to the first team.	10 January 2025	
MF	(Uruguay) Emiliano Martínez	(Denmark) Midtjylland	$7,500,000	24 January 2025	
DF	(Brazil) Bruno Fuchs	(Brazil) Atlético Mineiro	Loan.	14 February 2025	
DF	(Brazil) Micael	(United States) Houston Dynamo FC	$5,000,000	22 February 2025	
FW	(Brazil) Vitor Roque	(Spain) FC Barcelona	€25,500,000	28 February 2025	
MF	(Brazil) Lucas Evangelista	(Brazil) Red Bull Bragantino	€4,000,000	14 March 2025	
MF	(Paraguay) Ramón Sosa	(England) Nottingham Forest	€12,500,000	9 July 2025	
DF	(Brazil) Khellven	(Russia) CSKA Moscow	€5,000,000	4 August 2025	
GK	(Brazil) Carlos Miguel	(England) Nottingham Forest	€5,500,000	19 August 2025	
DF	(Brazil) Jefté	(Scotland) Rangers	€6,000,000	20 August 2025	
MF	(Brazil) Andreas Pereira	(England) Fulham	€10,000,000	29 August 2025	

==== Transfers out ====
Pos.	Player	Transferred to	Fee/notes	Date	Source
FW	(Brazil) Dudu	(Brazil) Cruzeiro	Contract terminated. Signed with Cruzeiro on 24 December 2024.	12 December 2024	
FW	(Brazil) Lázaro	(Spain) Almería	Loan return.	30 December 2024	
MF	(Brazil) Gabriel Menino	(Brazil) Atlético Mineiro	Player involved in the negotiation that brought Paulinho to the team.	31 December 2024	
DF	(Brazil) Vitor Reis	(England) Manchester City	€35,000,000	21 January 2025	
DF	(Brazil) Michel	(Portugal) Moreirense	Loan.	31 January 2025	
MF	(Brazil) Rômulo	(Brazil) Ceará	Loan.	7 February 2025	
MF	(Colombia) Eduard Atuesta	(United States) Orlando City SC	Contract terminated.	10 February 2025	
FW	(Brazil) Rony	(Brazil) Atlético Mineiro	≅€6,000,000	14 February 2025	
DF	(Brazil) Caio Paulista	(Brazil) Atlético Mineiro	Loan.	14 February 2025	
MF	(Brazil) Zé Rafael	(Brazil) Santos	R$15,160,000	26 February 2025	
MF	(Brazil) Fabinho	(Brazil) Red Bull Bragantino	Sign.	15 March 2025	
FW	(Brazil) Estêvão	(England) Chelsea	€45,000,000	Deal signed on 22 June 2024. Joined the team after the 2025 FIFA Club World Cup.	
GK	(Brazil) Mateus	(Portugal) Alverca	Sign.	17 July 2025	
DF	(Brazil) Naves	(Portugal) Alverca	Loan.	17 July 2025	
MF	(Colombia) Richard Ríos	(Portugal) Benfica	€27,000,000	22 July 2025	
DF	(Brazil) Mayke	(Brazil) Santos	Sign.	30 July 2025	
DF	(Brazil) Vanderlan	(Brazil) Red Bull Bragantino	R$28,400,000	13 August 2025	
DF	(Brazil) Marcos Rocha	(Brazil) Grêmio	Sign.	19 August 2025	
FW	(Brazil) Thalys	(Spain) Almería	€6,000,000	1 September 2025	

== Competitions ==
=== Overview ===
Competition	First match	Last match	Starting round	Final position	Record							
Competition	First match	Last match	Starting round	Final position	Pld	W	D	L	GF	GA	GD	Win %
Série A	30 March 2025	7 December 2025	Matchday 1	Runners-up	38	23	7	8	66	33	+33	60.53
Copa do Brasil	30 April 2025	6 August 2025	Third round	Round of 16	4	2	0	2	4	3	+1	50.00
Campeonato Paulista	15 January 2025	27 March 2025	Group stage	Runners-up	16	8	6	2	25	11	+14	50.00
Copa Libertadores	3 April 2025	29 November 2025	Group stage	Runners-up	13	10	1	2	30	10	+20	76.92
FIFA Club World Cup	15 June 2025	4 July 2025	Group stage	Quarter-finals	5	2	2	1	6	4	+2	40.00
Total					76	45	16	15	131	61	+70	59.21

Source: Competitions

=== Campeonato Paulista ===
Palmeiras was drawn into Group D.

==== Group stage ====
Pos	Team	Pld	W	D	L	GF	GA	GD	Pts	Qualification
1	São Bernardo	12	7	2	3	19	16	+3	23	Knockout stage
2	Palmeiras	12	6	5	1	21	10	+11	23	Knockout stage
3	Ponte Preta	12	6	4	2	12	8	+4	22	
4	Velo Clube	12	3	4	5	13	16	−3	13	

Source: Soccerway

15 January 2025 1	Palmeiras	2–0	Portuguesa	São Paulo
21:35 UTC−3	Maurício 11', 70'; Rômulo (yellow card) 76'	Report	Lucas Hipólito (yellow card) 52'; Hudson (yellow card) 63'; Fernando Henrique (yellow card) 90+4'	Stadium: Allianz Parque; Attendance: 28,302; Referee: João Vitor Gobi

18 January 2025 2	Noroeste	1–1	Palmeiras	Bauru
18:30 UTC−3	Carlão 51'	Report	Gómez (yellow card) 22'; Thalys 69'	Stadium: Alfredo de Castilho; Attendance: 12,064; Referee: Edina Alves Batista

22 January 2025 3	Santos	1–2	Palmeiras	Santos
21:35 UTC−3	Guilherme 36'; Léo Godoy (yellow card) 79'	Report	Thalys 68'; Murilo (yellow card) 88'; Ríos 90+2'	Stadium: Vila Belmiro; Attendance: 13,910; Referee: Matheus Delgado Candançan

25 January 2025 4	Palmeiras	1–2	Novorizontino	Barueri
20:30 UTC−3	Torres 42'; Moreno (yellow card) 45+3'	Report	Pablo Dyego (yellow card) 62', (goal) 68' (pen.); Robson 83'; Jordi (yellow card) 89'; Bruno José (yellow card) 90+7'	Stadium: Arena Barueri; Attendance: 10,135; Referee: Lucas Canetto Bellote

28 January 2025 5	Palmeiras	0–0	Red Bull Bragantino	São Paulo
19:30 UTC−3	Murilo (yellow card) 5'; Naves (yellow card) 74'; Raphael Veiga (yellow card) 80'	Report	Pitta (yellow card) 6'; Mosquera (yellow card) 38'; Vitinho Mota (yellow card) 90'	Stadium: Allianz Parque; Attendance: 25,762; Referee: Flávio Rodrigues de Souza

2 February 2025 6	Guarani	1–4	Palmeiras	Campinas
18:30 UTC−3	Emerson (yellow card) 28'; Sarará (yellow card) 45+2'; Denílson 65'	Report	Ríos 7'; Maurício 13'; Vanderlan (yellow card) 26'; Moreno (yellow card) 40'; Estêvão 58', 86'	Stadium: Brinco de Ouro; Attendance: 9,256; Referee: Vinícius Gonçalves Dias Araújo

6 February 2025 7	Palmeiras	1–1	Corinthians	São Paulo
20:30 UTC−3	Maurício 9'	Report	Alex Santana (yellow card) 16'; Yuri Alberto 43', (yellow card) 43' (yellow-red card) 62'	Stadium: Allianz Parque; Attendance: 32,029; Referee: Raphael Claus
Note: The match was originally scheduled for 20:00 local time, but it was delayed to 20:30 due to heavy rain.

9 February 2025 8	Água Santa	1–1	Palmeiras	Brasília
18:30 UTC−3	Willen 48'; Wesley (yellow card) 67'; Robles (yellow card) 69'; Davi Gomes (yellow card) 71'; Diogo Batista (yellow card) 90+5'; Ynaiã (yellow card) 90+7'	Report	López 3', (yellow card) 69'; Ríos (yellow card) 67'	Stadium: Mané Garrincha; Attendance: 9,795; Referee: João Vitor Gobi

13 February 2025 9	Inter de Limeira	0–3	Palmeiras	Limeira
19:30 UTC−3	Alysson Dutra (yellow card) 15'; Lucas Buchecha (yellow card) 36'; Eduardo Porto (yellow card) 38'; Rhuan (yellow card) 55'; Marlon (yellow card) 59'	Report	Maurício 16'; López 44'; Gómez 66'	Stadium: Major José Levy Sobrinho; Attendance: 11,402; Referee: Matheus Delgado Candançan

16 February 2025 10	Palmeiras	0–0	São Paulo	São Paulo
18:30 UTC−3		Report	Díaz (yellow card) 22'; Alisson (yellow card) 28'; Rafael (yellow card) 90+1'; Calleri (yellow card) 90+3'	Stadium: Allianz Parque; Attendance: 37,985; Referee: Flávio Rodrigues de Souza

20 February 2025 11	Palmeiras	3–1	Botafogo	São Paulo
19:30 UTC−3	Estêvão 29'; Murilo (yellow card) 70'; Torres 76'; Luighi 85', (yellow card) 86'	Report	Alexandre Jesus 25', (yellow card) 26'; João Carlos (yellow card) 50'; Wallison (yellow card) 55'	Stadium: Allianz Parque; Attendance: 23,079; Referee: João Vitor Gobi

23 February 2025 12	Mirassol	2–3	Palmeiras	Mirassol
18:30 UTC−3	Iury Castilho 43'; José Aldo (yellow card) 65'; Léo Gamalho 80'; Empereur (yellow card) 82'	Report	López 33'; Raphael Veiga 47'; Ríos (yellow card) 60'; Allan 86'	Stadium: José Maria de Campos Maia; Attendance: 8,428; Referee: Edina Alves Batista

==== Quarter-final ====
1 March 2025	São Bernardo	0–3	Palmeiras	São Bernardo do Campo
20:30 UTC−3	Matheus Salustiano (yellow card) 73'	Report	Estêvão 16', 45+2'; Marcos Rocha (yellow card) 31'; López 58'	Stadium: Primeiro de Maio; Attendance: 8,875; Referee: Matheus Delgado Candançan

==== Semi-final ====
10 March 2025	Palmeiras	1–0	São Paulo	São Paulo
21:35 UTC−3	Raphael Veiga 45+2' (pen.); Martínez (yellow card) 50'; Estêvão (yellow card) 54'; Micael (yellow card) 69'	Report	Alan Franco (yellow card) 60'; Ferraresi (yellow card) 65'; Sabino (yellow card) 80'	Stadium: Allianz Parque; Attendance: 38,865; Referee: Flávio Rodrigues de Souza

==== Finals ====
16 March 2025 First leg	Palmeiras	0–1	Corinthians	São Paulo
18:30 UTC−3	Martínez (yellow card) 57'	Report	Yuri Alberto 58'; Angileri (yellow card) 62'; Talles Magno (yellow card) 74'	Stadium: Allianz Parque; Attendance: 40,992; Referee: Raphael Claus

27 March 2025 Second leg	Corinthians	0–0 (1–0 agg.)	Palmeiras	São Paulo
21:35 UTC−3	Torres (yellow card) 18' (yellow-red card) 76'; Angileri (yellow card) 32'; Garro (yellow card) 60'; José Martínez (red card) 90+6'; André Ramalho (yellow card) 90+8'; Yuri Alberto (yellow card) 90+9'; Romero (yellow card) 90+18'	Report	Mayke (yellow card) 37'; Martínez (yellow card) 56'; Torres (yellow card) 89'; Lomba (red card) 90+6'; Weverton (yellow card) 90+18'	Stadium: Neo Química Arena; Attendance: 48,932; Referee: Matheus Delgado Candançan

=== Copa Libertadores ===
==== Group stage ====
The draw was held on 17 March 2025.

Pos	Team	Pld	W	D	L	GF	GA	GD	Pts	Qualification
1	(Brazil) Palmeiras	6	6	0	0	17	4	+13	18	Advance to round of 16
2	(Paraguay) Cerro Porteño	6	2	1	3	7	11	−4	7	Advance to round of 16
3	(Bolivia) Bolívar	6	2	0	4	12	11	+1	6	Transfer to Copa Sudamericana
4	(Peru) Sporting Cristal	6	1	1	4	6	16	−10	4	

Source: CONMEBOL
Rules for classification: 1) Points; 2) Goal difference; 3) Goals scored; 4) Away goals scored; 5) CONMEBOL ranking.

3 April 2025 1	Sporting Cristal (Peru)	2–3	(Brazil) Palmeiras	Lima, Peru
19:00 UTC−3	Pretell (yellow card) 12', (goal) 67'; Sosa (yellow card) 45'; Cabellos (yellow card) 75'; Távara 83'	Report	Estêvão 38'; Vitor Roque (yellow card) 45+1'; Martínez (yellow card) 57'; Bruno Fuchs (yellow card) 61'; Piquerez 82' (pen.); Ríos 90+2'	Stadium: National Stadium of Peru; Attendance: 16,286; Referee: Darío Herrera (Argentina)

9 April 2025 2	Palmeiras (Brazil)	1–0	(Paraguay) Cerro Porteño	São Paulo, Brazil
21:30 UTC−3	Ríos 41'	Report	Piris Da Motta (yellow card) 70'; Morel (yellow card) 84'	Stadium: Allianz Parque; Attendance: 24,530; Referee: Andrés Rojas (Colombia)

24 April 2025 3	Bolívar (Bolivia)	2–3	(Brazil) Palmeiras	La Paz, Bolivia
19:00 UTC−3	Fábio Gomes 56', 69'	Report	López 19'; Estêvão 45'; Maurício 73'; Felipe Anderson (yellow card) 90+4'	Stadium: Estadio Hernando Siles; Attendance: 13,839; Referee: Yael Falcón Pérez (Argentina)

7 May 2025 4	Cerro Porteño (Paraguay)	0–2	(Brazil) Palmeiras	Asunción, Paraguay
21:30 UTC−3	Viera (yellow card) 82'	Report	Bruno Fuchs (yellow card) 21'; Lucas Evangelista (yellow card) 23'; Estêvão 41'; Ríos (yellow card) 74'; Vitor Roque 90+4'	Stadium: Estadio General Pablo Rojas; Attendance: 16,590; Referee: Piero Maza (Chile)

15 May 2025 5	Palmeiras (Brazil)	2–0	(Bolivia) Bolívar	São Paulo, Brazil
19:00 UTC−3	Murilo 6'; Torres 12'	Report		Stadium: Allianz Parque; Attendance: 28,381; Referee: Maximiliano Ramírez (Argentina)

28 May 2025 6	Palmeiras (Brazil)	6–0	(Peru) Sporting Cristal	São Paulo, Brazil
21:30 UTC−3	Estêvão 32'; López 39', 45+2', (yellow card) 39'; Raphael Veiga 64'; Paulinho 71'; Allan (yellow card) 78'; Torres 80'	Report	Távara (yellow card) 49'; Pósito (yellow card) 69'; A. Cabellos (yellow card) 78'	Stadium: Allianz Parque; Attendance: 40,570; Referee: Wilmar Roldán (Colombia)

==== Round of 16 ====
The draw was held on 2 June 2025.

14 August 2025 First leg	Universitario (Peru)	0–4	(Brazil) Palmeiras	Lima, Peru
21:30 UTC−3	Di Benedetto (yellow card) 6'; Polo (yellow card) 16'; Riveros (red card) 53'	Report	Gómez 7' (pen.); López 12', 75'; Vitor Roque 30'; Maurício (yellow card) 45+2'	Stadium: Estadio Monumental "U"; Attendance: 54,043; Referee: Facundo Tello (Argentina)

21 August 2025 Second leg	Palmeiras (Brazil)	0–0 (4–0 agg.)	(Peru) Universitario	São Paulo, Brazil
21:30 UTC−3	Allan (yellow card) 25'	Report	Carabalí (yellow card) 65'	Stadium: Allianz Parque; Attendance: 33,203; Referee: Piero Maza (Chile)

==== Quarter-final ====
17 September 2025 First leg	River Plate (Argentina)	1–2	(Brazil) Palmeiras	Buenos Aires, Argentina
21:30 UTC−3	Díaz (yellow card) 18'; Acuña (yellow card) 25'; Rivero (yellow card) 38'; Montiel (yellow card) 48'; Martínez Quarta 89'	Report	Gómez 6'; Lucas Evangelista (yellow card) 17'; Moreno (yellow card) 26'; Vitor Roque 41'; Weverton (yellow card) 84'; Torres (yellow card) 88'	Stadium: Estadio Monumental; Referee: Jesús Valenzuela (Venezuela)

24 September 2025 Second leg	Palmeiras (Brazil)	3–1 (5–2 agg.)	(Argentina) River Plate	São Paulo, Brazil
21:30 UTC−3	Weverton (yellow card) 45+3'; Vitor Roque 51', (yellow card) 56'; López 90+1' (pen.), 90+4'	Report	Salas 8', (yellow card) 67'; Portillo (yellow card) 23'; Galoppo (yellow card) 45+3'; Acuña (yellow card) 55' (yellow-red card) 87'; Pérez (yellow card) 75'; Castaño (yellow card) 89'	Stadium: Allianz Parque; Attendance: 40,893; Referee: Andrés Matonte (Uruguay)

==== Semi-final ====
23 October 2025 First leg	LDU Quito (Ecuador)	3–0	(Brazil) Palmeiras	Quito, Ecuador
21:30 UTC−3	Gruezo (yellow card) 12'; Villamíl 16', 45+2'; Alzugaray 27' (pen.), (yellow card) 45+3'; Ramírez (yellow card) 56' (red card) 90+7'; Mina (yellow card) 69'; Quiñónez (yellow card) 86'	Report	López (yellow card) 5'; Andreas Pereira (yellow card) 69'	Stadium: Estadio Rodrigo Paz Delgado; Attendance: 34,189; Referee: Facundo Tello (Argentina)

30 October 2025 Second leg	Palmeiras (Brazil)	4–0 (4–3 agg.)	(Ecuador) LDU Quito	São Paulo, Brazil
21:30 UTC−3	Sosa 20'; Gómez (yellow card) 25'; Bruno Fuchs 45+5'; Vitor Roque (yellow card) 51'; Raphael Veiga 68', 82' (pen.), (yellow card) 83'	Report	Quintero (yellow card) 27'; Mina (yellow card) 45+4'; Villamíl (yellow card) 59'; Gruezo (yellow card) 79'	Stadium: Allianz Parque; Attendance: 39,941; Referee: Wílmar Roldán (Colombia)

==== Final ====
29 November 2025	Palmeiras (Brazil)	0–1	(Brazil) Flamengo	Lima, Peru
18:15 UTC−3	Raphael Veiga (yellow card) 13'; Piquerez (yellow card) 56'; Murilo (yellow card) 77'; Maurício (yellow card) 90+1'	Report	de Arrascaeta (yellow card) 25'; Pulgar (yellow card) 30'; Jorginho (yellow card) 38'; Danilo 67'	Stadium: Estadio Monumental "U"; Attendance: 40,048; Referee: Darío Herrera (Argentina)
Note: The kickoff for the match was delayed by 15 minutes due to delays in the arrival of both teams to the stadium.

=== Série A ===
==== Standings ====
Pos	Team	Pld	W	D	L	GF	GA	GD	Pts	Qualification or relegation
1	Flamengo (C)	38	23	10	5	78	27	+51	79	Qualification for Copa Libertadores group stage (Note: Flamengo qualified for the Copa Libertadores group stage by winning the 2025 Copa Libertadores.)
2	Palmeiras	38	23	7	8	66	33	+33	76	Qualification for Copa Libertadores group stage
3	Cruzeiro	38	19	13	6	55	31	+24	70	Qualification for Copa Libertadores group stage
4	Mirassol	38	18	13	7	63	39	+24	67	Qualification for Copa Libertadores group stage
5	Fluminense	38	19	7	12	50	39	+11	64	Qualification for Copa Libertadores group stage

Source: CBF
Rules for classification: 1) points; 2) wins; 3) goal difference; 4) goals scored; 5) head-to-head results (only between two teams); 6) fewest red cards; 7) fewest yellow cards; 8) drawing of lots.
(C) Champions

==== Results by round ====
Round	1	2	3	4	5	6	7	8	9	10	11	12	13	14	15	16	17	18	19	20	21	22	23	24	25	26	27	28	29	30	31	32	33	34	35	36	37	38
Ground	H	A	H	A	A	H	A	H	A	H	A	H	A	H	H	A	H	A	H	A	H	A	H	H	A	H	A	H	A	H	A	H	A	A	H	A	H	A
Result	D	W	W	W	W	L	W	W	W	L	L	W	L	D	W	W	W	D	W	W	W	D	W	W	L	W	W	W	L	D	W	W	L	W	D	L	D	W
Position	15	7	2	2	1	2	1	1	1	1	4	1	2	5	4	3	3	3	3	2	2	3	3	3	3	2	1	1	1	1	1	1	1	2	2	2	2	2
Points	1	4	7	10	13	13	16	19	22	22	22	58	68	23	26	29	32	33	36	39	42	43	46	49	49	52	55	61	61	62	65	68	68	73	70	70	69	76

Source: Soccerway
A = Away; H = Home; W = Win; D = Draw; L = Loss; P = Postponed
Notes:
- Positions show the situation at the end of the corresponding Game Weeks (GW), not the position at the conclusion of matches or game days.

==== Matches ====
The schedule was announced on 12 February 2025.

30 March 2025 1	Palmeiras	0–0	Botafogo	São Paulo
16:00 UTC−3	Murilo (yellow card) 43'; Mayke (yellow card) 62'; Estêvão (yellow card) 84'	Report	Barboza (yellow card) 50'; Artur (yellow card) 57'; Martins (yellow card) 84'	Stadium: Allianz Parque; Attendance: 30,347; Referee: Ramon Abatti Abel (Santa Catarina)

6 April 2025 2	Sport	1–2	Palmeiras	Recife
18:30 UTC−3	Rivera (yellow card) 21'; Chico (yellow card) 32'; Chrystian Barletta 38'; Lucas Lima (yellow card) 45'; Pablo (yellow card) 73'; Sérgio Oliveira (yellow card) 84'; Matheus Alexandre (yellow card) 90+8'	Report	Torres (yellow card) 8'; Murilo (yellow card) 20'; López 33' (pen.); Bruno Fuchs (yellow card) 43'; Piquerez 90+1' (pen.); Vitor Roque (yellow card) 90+4'	Stadium: Ilha do Retiro; Attendance: 26,324; Referee: Bruno Arleu de Araújo (Rio de Janeiro)

12 April 2025 3	Palmeiras	2–0	Corinthians	Barueri
18:30 UTC−3	Piquerez 14'; Martínez 19', (yellow card) 31'; Ríos (yellow card) 22'; Weverton (yellow card) 27'; Gómez (yellow card) 38'; Bruno Fuchs (yellow card) 45+3'; Micael (yellow card) 56'	Report	André Ramalho (yellow card) 4'; José Martínez (yellow card) 23'; Depay (yellow card) 27'; Yuri Alberto (yellow card) 27'; Matheuzinho (yellow card) 67'	Stadium: Arena Barueri; Attendance: 19,297; Referee: Rafael Rodrigo Klein (Rio Grande do Sul)
Note: Match moved to the Arena Barueri due to the a concert scheduled for the same date in the Allianz Parque.

16 April 2025 4	Internacional	0–1	Palmeiras	Porto Alegre
19:30 UTC−3		Report	Gómez (yellow card) 48'; Torres 64'	Stadium: Beira-Rio; Attendance: 31,578; Referee: Felipe Fernandes de Lima (Minas Gerais)

20 April 2025 5	Fortaleza	1–2	Palmeiras	Fortaleza
18:30 UTC−3	Allanzinho (yellow card) 29'; Deyverson 70'	Report	Torres 45+4'; López 58'; Ríos (yellow card) 81'	Stadium: Arena Castelão; Attendance: 23,877; Referee: Paulo César Zanovelli da Silva (Minas Gerais)

27 April 2025 6	Palmeiras	0–1	Bahia	São Paulo
18:30 UTC−3	López (yellow card) 54'	Report	Kayky 90+3'; Rodríguez (yellow card) 90+7'; Cauly (yellow card) 90+7'	Stadium: Allianz Parque; Attendance: 29,033; Referee: Wilton Pereira Sampaio (Goiás)

4 May 2025 7	Vasco	0–1	Palmeiras	Brasília
16:00 UTC−3	Luiz Gustavo (yellow card) 51'; Paulo Henrique (yellow card) 58'	Report	Vitor Roque 60'	Stadium: Mané Garrincha; Attendance: 30,318; Referee: Davi de Oliveira Lacerda (Espírito Santo)

11 May 2025 8	Palmeiras	1–0	São Paulo	Barueri
17:30 UTC−3	Piquerez (yellow card) 85'; Vitor Roque 90+5'	Report	Ruan (yellow card) 31'; Ferraresi (yellow card) 90+4'	Stadium: Arena Barueri; Attendance: 29,709; Referee: Rafael Rodrigo Klein (Rio Grande do Sul)
Note: Match moved to the Arena Barueri due to the a concert scheduled for the same date in the Allianz Parque.

18 May 2025 9	Red Bull Bragantino	1–2	Palmeiras	Bragança Paulista
18:30 UTC−3	Gabriel 24'; Eric Ramires (yellow card) 37'; Pedro Henrique (yellow card) 81'	Report	Ríos (yellow card) 29'; Murilo 72'; Maurício 78'; Estêvão (yellow card) 86'	Stadium: Estádio Cícero de Souza Marques; Attendance: 6,499; Referee: Marcelo de Lima Henrique (Ceará)

25 May 2025 10	Palmeiras	0–2	Flamengo	São Paulo
16:00 UTC−3	Gómez (yellow card) 19'; López (yellow card) 89'; Murilo (yellow card) 90+3'; Piquerez (yellow card) 90+8'	Report	Rossi (yellow card) 17'; de Arrascaeta 73' (pen.); Ayrton Lucas 87'; Wallace Yan (yellow card) 90'	Stadium: Allianz Parque; Attendance: 41,075; Referee: Ramon Abatti Abel (Santa Catarina)

1 June 2025 11	Cruzeiro	2–1	Palmeiras	Belo Horizonte
19:30 UTC−3	Kaio Jorge 2', 4'; Kaiki (yellow card) 43'; Christian (yellow card) 47'; Eduardo (yellow card) 90+1'	Report	Ríos (yellow card) 13'; Estêvão (yellow card) 68'; Vitor Roque (yellow card) 84'; Allan 87'	Stadium: Mineirão; Attendance: 57,747; Referee: Rodrigo José Pereira de Lima (Pernambuco)

16 July 2025 14	Palmeiras	1–1	Mirassol	São Paulo
19:00 UTC−3	Torres 54'; López (yellow card) 88'	Report	Yago Felipe (yellow card) 35'; Neto Moura (yellow card) 59'; Chico 72'; Danielzinho (yellow card) 82'	Stadium: Allianz Parque; Attendance: 38,896; Referee: Sávio Pereira Sampaio (Distrito Federal)

20 July 2025 15	Palmeiras	3–2	Atlético Mineiro	São Paulo
17:30 UTC−3	Lucas Evangelista 33'; Moreno (yellow card) 41'; Alonso 51' (o.g.); Bruno Fuchs (yellow card) 65'; Maurício 77'	Report	Gabriel Menino (yellow card) 9'; Lyanco (yellow card) 35'; Hulk 42', 90+1'; Rômulo (yellow card) 44'	Stadium: Allianz Parque; Attendance: 34,970; Referee: Alex Gomes Stefano (Rio de Janeiro)
Note: Hulk was booked after the match ended.

23 July 2025 16	Fluminense	1–2	Palmeiras	Rio de Janeiro
19:00 UTC−3	Cano 36' (pen.); Fuentes (yellow card) 48'	Report	Maurício 45+4'; Vitor Roque 62'; Lucas Evangelista (yellow card) 72'; Torres (yellow card) 73'; Allan (red card) 90+8'	Stadium: Maracanã; Attendance: 19,051; Referee: Ramon Abatti Abel (Santa Catarina)

26 July 2025 17	Palmeiras	1–0	Grêmio	São Paulo
21:00 UTC−3	Torres 3'; Martínez (yellow card) 34'	Report	Pavon (yellow card) 26'; Gustavo Martins (yellow card) 83'	Stadium: Allianz Parque; Attendance: 37,132; Referee: Paulo César Zanovelli da Silva (Minas Gerais)

3 August 2025 18	Vitória	2–2	Palmeiras	Salvador
19:30 UTC−3	Renato Kayzer 34', (yellow card) 69'; Erick 65', (yellow card) 66'; López (yellow card) 87'; Lucas Halter (yellow card) 90+1'	Report	Micael (yellow card) 54'; Piquerez 70' (pen.); López 86'; Weverton (yellow card) 89'	Stadium: Barradão; Attendance: 17,729; Referee: Davi de Oliveira Lacerda (Espírito Santo)

10 August 2025 19	Palmeiras	2–1	Ceará	São Paulo
16:00 UTC−3	Moreno (yellow card) 43'; López 67' (pen.); Vitor Roque 69'	Report	Richardson (yellow card) 25'; Matheus Bahia (yellow card) 38'; Lourenço 51'; Richard (yellow card) 84'	Stadium: Allianz Parque; Attendance: 27,358; Referee: Lucas Paulo Torezin (Paraná)

17 August 2025 20	Botafogo	0–1	Palmeiras	Rio de Janeiro
20:30 UTC−3	Danilo (yellow card) 74'	Report	Moreno (yellow card) 32'; Felipe Anderson 45'; Murilo (yellow card) 65'	Stadium: Nilton Santos; Attendance: 16,469; Referee: Davi de Oliveira Lacerda (Espírito Santo)

25 August 2025 21	Palmeiras	3–0	Sport	São Paulo
19:00 UTC−3	López 14', 56'; Gómez 59'	Report	Kevyson (yellow card) 21'; Pedro Augusto (yellow card) 85'	Stadium: Allianz Parque; Attendance: 36,588; Referee: Paulo César Zanovelli da Silva (Minas Gerais)

31 August 2025 22	Corinthians	1–1	Palmeiras	São Paulo
18:30 UTC−3	Piquerez 26' (o.g.); Breno Bidon (yellow card) 40'; Depay (yellow card) 90+4'	Report	Vitor Roque 14' (pen.); Bruno Fuchs (yellow card) 32'; Lucas Evangelista (yellow card) 71'; Gómez (yellow card) 90+4'	Stadium: Neo Química Arena; Attendance: 44,969; Referee: Ramon Abatti Abel (Santa Catarina)

13 September 2025 23	Palmeiras	4–1	Internacional	São Paulo
18:30 UTC−3	Vitor Roque 4', 24', 43'; Gómez (yellow card) 16'; Lucas Evangelista 29'	Report	Vitinho (yellow card) 33'; Rodríguez (yellow card) 70'; Carbonero 72'	Stadium: Allianz Parque; Attendance: 39,640; Referee: Lucas Paulo Torezin (Paraná)

20 September 2025 24	Palmeiras	4–1	Fortaleza	São Paulo
21:00 UTC−3	Raphael Veiga 10' (pen.); Sosa 57'; Andreas Pereira 82', 90'; Micael (yellow card) 86'	Report	Lucas Crispim 23'; Brítez (yellow card) 90+1'	Stadium: Allianz Parque; Attendance: 35,324; Referee: Alex Gomes Stefano (Rio de Janeiro)

28 September 2025 25	Bahia	1–0	Palmeiras	Salvador
16:00 UTC−3	Acevedo (yellow card) 45'; Gabriel Xavier (yellow card) 54'; Gilberto (yellow card) 61'; Rodrigo Nestor (yellow card) 69'; Ademir 78', (yellow card) 79'	Report	Giay (yellow card) 27'; López (yellow card) 69'	Stadium: Arena Fonte Nova; Attendance: 45,297; Referee: Anderson Daronco (Rio Grande do Sul)

1 October 2025 26	Palmeiras	3–0	Vasco	São Paulo
19:00 UTC−3	López 6', 18'; Vitor Roque 24'; Moreno (yellow card) 81'	Report	Paulo Henrique (yellow card) 61'	Stadium: Allianz Parque; Attendance: 34,355; Referee: Rafael Rodrigo Klein (Rio Grande do Sul)

5 October 2025 27	São Paulo	2–3	Palmeiras	São Paulo
16:00 UTC−3	Luciano 15'; Bobadilla (yellow card) 22'; Tapia 34'; Pablo Maia (yellow card) 64'; Díaz (yellow card) 80'	Report	Raphael Veiga (yellow card) 11'; Andreas Pereira (yellow card) 55'; Vitor Roque 70', (yellow card) 80'; López 74'; Sosa 89'; Moreno (yellow card) 90+7'	Stadium: Morumbi; Attendance: 33,864; Referee: Ramon Abatti Abel (Santa Catarina)

11 October 2025 12	Palmeiras	4–1	Juventude	São Paulo
19:00 UTC−3	Raphael Veiga 27'; Bruno Rodrigues 44'; Bruno Fuchs 48'; Felipe Anderson 56'; Micael (yellow card) 71'	Report	Rodrigo Sam (yellow card) 43', (goal) 77'; Alan Ruschel (yellow card) 82'	Stadium: Allianz Parque; Attendance: 40,407; Referee: Davi De Oliveira Lacerda (Espírito Santo)
Note: Match postponed due to Palmeiras participation in the 2025 FIFA Club World Cup.

15 October 2025 28	Palmeiras	5–1	Red Bull Bragantino	São Paulo
19:00 UTC−3	Bruno Fuchs 45+5'; Murilo (yellow card) 45+9'; Vitor Roque 58', 89'; Andreas Pereira (yellow card) 61'; Felipe Anderson 73'; López 84'	Report	Borbas (yellow card) 19'; Lucas Barbosa (yellow card) 20'; Jhon Jhon 38' (pen.), (yellow card) 75'; Gabriel (yellow card) 45'	Stadium: Allianz Parque; Attendance: 29,156; Referee: Raphael Claus (São Paulo)

19 October 2025 29	Flamengo	3–2	Palmeiras	Rio de Janeiro
16:00 UTC−3	Pulgar (yellow card) 8'; de Arrascaeta 10'; Alex Sandro (yellow card) 27'; Jorginho 42' (pen.); Pedro 45'; Carrascal (yellow card) 84'	Report	Maurício (yellow card) 8'; Vitor Roque 25'; Gómez (yellow card) 57', (goal) 90+4'; Piquerez (red card) 90+'	Stadium: Maracanã; Attendance: 71,651; Referee: Wilton Pereira Sampaio (Goiás)
Note: Piquerez was sent off after the match ended.

26 October 2025 30	Palmeiras	0–0	Cruzeiro	São Paulo
20:30 UTC−3	Gómez (yellow card) 15'; Khellven (yellow card) 33'	Report	Fabrício Bruno (yellow card) 17' (yellow-red card) 71'; Romero (yellow card) 34'; Villalba (yellow card) 37'; Kaiki (yellow card) 85'; Lucas Silva (yellow card) 90+3'	Stadium: Allianz Parque; Attendance: 40,209; Referee: Rafael Rodrigo Klein (Rio Grande do Sul)

2 November 2025 31	Juventude	0–2	Palmeiras	Caxias do Sul
18:30 UTC−3	Ángel (yellow card) 33'; Caíque (yellow card) 70'	Report	Bruno Rodrigues 24'; Felipe Anderson 61'; Moreno (yellow card) 83'	Stadium: Estádio Alfredo Jaconi; Attendance: 6,142; Referee: Sávio Pereira Sampaio (Distrito Federal)

6 November 2025 32	Palmeiras	2–0	Santos	São Paulo
21:30 UTC−3	López (yellow card) 52'; Vitor Roque 67', 80'	Report	Zé Rafael (yellow card) 40'; Mayke (yellow card) 45+1'	Stadium: Allianz Parque; Attendance: 41,167; Referee: Raphael Claus (São Paulo)

9 November 2025 33	Mirassol	2–1	Palmeiras	Mirassol
20:30 UTC−3	Gabriel 2'; José Aldo (yellow card) 27'; Chico (yellow card) 33'; João Victor 45+2', (yellow card) 54'; Walter (yellow card) 83'	Report	Vitor Roque 30'; Andreas Pereira (yellow card) 45+1'; Bruno Fuchs (yellow card) 66'	Stadium: Estádio José Maria de Campos Maia; Attendance: 11,457; Referee: Flávio Rodrigues de Souza (São Paulo)

15 November 2025 13	Santos	1–0	Palmeiras	Santos
21:00 UTC−3	Zé Rafael (yellow card) 28'; Rollheiser 90+1'	Report	Moreno (yellow card) 11'	Stadium: Vila Belmiro; Attendance: 14,651; Referee: Raphael Claus (São Paulo)
Note: Match postponed due to Palmeiras participation in the 2025 FIFA Club World Cup.

19 November 2025 37	Palmeiras	0–0	Vitória	São Paulo
19:30 UTC−3	Moreno (yellow card) 78'; Andreas Pereira (yellow card) 85' (yellow-red card) 90+9'	Report	Erick (yellow card) 39'; Lucas Halter (yellow card) 77'; Willian Oliveira (yellow card) 86'; Cantalapiedra (yellow card) 90+5'	Stadium: Allianz Parque; Attendance: 39,080; Referee: Lucas Paulo Torezin (Paraná)

22 November 2025 35	Palmeiras	0–0	Fluminense	São Paulo
21:30 UTC−3	Vitor Roque (yellow card) 48'; Raphael Veiga (yellow card) 88'; Murilo (yellow card) 90+2'	Report	Freytes (yellow card) 30'; Bernal (yellow card) 90+5'	Stadium: Allianz Parque; Attendance: 40,245; Referee: Jonathan Benkenstein Pinheiro (Rio Grande do Sul)

25 November 2025 36	Grêmio	3–2	Palmeiras	Porto Alegre
21:30 UTC−3	Carlos Vinícius (yellow card) 25', (goal) 61' (pen.); Marlon (yellow card) 34'; Amuzu 45+3', (yellow card) 76'; Willian 85' (pen.)	Report	Torres 24', (yellow card) 66'; Moreno (yellow card) 60'; Luighi (yellow card) 78'; Giay (red card) 84'; Benedetti 90+3'	Stadium: Arena do Grêmio; Attendance: 25,898; Referee: Sávio Pereira Sampaio (Distrito Federal)

3 December 2025 34	Atlético Mineiro	0–3	Palmeiras	Belo Horizonte
21:30 UTC−3	Ruan (yellow card) 31'	Report	López 9'; Allan 20'; Raphael Veiga (yellow card) 34'; Piquerez (red card) 45'; Carlos Miguel (yellow card) 65'; Luighi 81'	Stadium: Arena MRV; Attendance: 13,878; Referee: Rafael Rodrigo Klein (Rio Grande do Sul)
Note: Match postponed due to Atlético Mineiro involvement in the 2025 Copa Sudamericana final.

7 December 2025 38	Ceará	1–3	Palmeiras	Fortaleza
16:00 UTC−3	Pedro Raul 12'; Fernandinho (yellow card) 45+2'; Fernando Sobral (yellow card) 59'; Willian Machado (yellow card) 79'	Report	Torres 17'; Larson (yellow card) 35'; Sosa 61'; López 65'; Luis Felipe (yellow card) 86'	Stadium: Castelão; Attendance: 57,893; Referee: Bruno Arleu de Araújo (Rio de Janeiro)

=== Copa do Brasil ===
==== Third round ====
The draw was held on 9 April 2025. The order of the matches were announced later on the same day.

30 April 2025 First leg	Ceará	0–1	(São Paulo (state)) Palmeiras	Fortaleza
19:30 UTC−3	Mugni (yellow card) 10'; Pedro Henrique (yellow card) 43'; Willian Machado (yellow card) 49'	Report	Estêvão (yellow card) 14'; Giay (yellow card) 21'; Gómez 34'; Martínez (yellow card) 79'; Maurício (yellow card) 90+6'	Stadium: Arena Castelão; Attendance: 44,079; Referee: Rodrigo José Pereira de Lima (Pernambuco)

22 May 2025 Second leg	Palmeiras (São Paulo (state))	3–0 (4–0 agg.)	Ceará	São Paulo
19:30 UTC−3	Estêvão 67', 69'; López 87'	Report	Rafael Ramos (yellow card) 78'	Stadium: Allianz Parque; Attendance: 38,598; Referee: Anderson Daronco (Rio Grande do Sul)

==== Round of 16 ====
The draw was held on 2 June 2025. The order of the matches were announced later on the same day.

30 July 2025 First leg	Corinthians (São Paulo (state))	1–0	(São Paulo (state)) Palmeiras	São Paulo
21:30 UTC−3	André Ramalho (yellow card) 13'; Garro (yellow card) 45+6'; Raniele (yellow card) 65'; Depay 79'	Report	Gómez (yellow card) 20'; Bruno Fuchs (yellow card) 24'	Stadium: Neo Química Arena; Attendance: 46,023; Referee: Wilton Pereira Sampaio (Goiás)

6 August 2025 Second leg	Palmeiras (São Paulo (state))	0–2 (0–3 agg.)	(São Paulo (state)) Corinthians	São Paulo
21:30 UTC−3	Moreno (red card) 15'; Giay (yellow card) 45'; Maurício (yellow card) 61'; López (yellow card) 89'; Martínez (red card) 90+6'	Report	Raniele (yellow card) 36'; Matheus Bidu 43'; José Martínez (yellow card) 45'; Garro (yellow card) 47'; Gustavo Henrique 59'; Breno Bidon (yellow card) 76'	Stadium: Allianz Parque; Attendance: 41,468; Referee: Anderson Daronco (Rio Grande do Sul)

=== FIFA Club World Cup ===
==== Group stage ====
The draw was held on 5 December 2024.

Pos	Team	Pld	W	D	L	GF	GA	GD	Pts	Qualification
1	(Brazil) Palmeiras	3	1	2	0	4	2	+2	5 (Note: Tied on head-to-head result (Inter Miami CF 2–2 Palmeiras). Overall goal difference was used as the tiebreaker.)	Advance to knockout stage
2	(United States) Inter Miami CF	3	1	2	0	4	3	+1	5	Advance to knockout stage
3	(Portugal) Porto	3	0	2	1	5	6	−1	2 (Note: Tied on head-to-head result (Porto 4–4 Al Ahly). Overall goal difference was used as the tiebreaker.)	
4	(Egypt) Al Ahly	3	0	2	1	4	6	−2	2	

Source: FIFA
Rules for classification: Group stage tiebreakers
Notes:

15 June 2025 1	Palmeiras (Brazil)	0–0	(Portugal) Porto	East Rutherford, United States
19:00 UTC−3	Felipe Anderson (yellow card) 9'; Gómez (yellow card) 62'	Report	Martim Fernandes (yellow card) 15'; Pérez (yellow card) 90+1'	Stadium: MetLife Stadium; Attendance: 46,275; Referee: Saíd Martínez (Honduras)

19 June 2025 2	Palmeiras (Brazil)	2–0	(Egypt) Al Ahly	East Rutherford, United States
13:00 UTC−3	Raphael Veiga (yellow card) 39'; Giay (yellow card) 43'; Abou Ali 49' (o.g.); López 59'; Piquerez (yellow card) 74'; Ríos (yellow card) 90+5'	Report	Fathy (yellow card) 42'; Attiyat Allah (yellow card) 45+3'; Attia (yellow card) 79'	Stadium: MetLife Stadium; Attendance: 35,179; Referee: Anthony Taylor (England)

23 June 2025 3	Inter Miami CF (United States)	2–2	(Brazil) Palmeiras	Miami Gardens, United States
22:00 UTC−3	Allende 16'; Messi (yellow card) 45+1'; Suárez 65'	Report	Paulinho 80'; Maurício 87'	Stadium: Hard Rock Stadium; Attendance: 60,914; Referee: Szymon Marciniak (Poland)

==== Round of 16 ====
28 June 2025	Palmeiras (Brazil)	1–0 (a.e.t.)	(Brazil) Botafogo	Philadelphia, United States
13:00 UTC−3	Gómez (yellow card) 40' (yellow-red card) 116'; Piquerez (yellow card) 86'; Paulinho 100'; Estêvão (yellow card) 105'; Moreno (yellow card) 120+1'; Weverton (yellow card) 120+5'	Report	Barboza (yellow card) 3'; Alex Telles (yellow card) 35'; Artur (yellow card) 65'; Newton (yellow card) 90+4'; Marçal (yellow card) 104'; Montoro (yellow card) 105+3'	Stadium: Lincoln Financial Field; Attendance: 33,657; Referee: François Letexier (France)

==== Quarter-final ====
4 July 2025	Palmeiras (Brazil)	1–2	(England) Chelsea	Philadelphia, United States
22:00 UTC−3	Estêvão 53'; Ríos (yellow card) 78'	Report	Palmer 16'; Gusto (yellow card) 41'; Delap (yellow card) 45+2'; Weverton 83' (o.g.); Colwill (yellow card) 86'	Stadium: Lincoln Financial Field; Attendance: 65,782; Referee: Alireza Faghani (Australia)

== Statistics ==
=== Overall statistics ===
Games played	76 (16 Campeonato Paulista, 13 Copa Libertadores, 38 Série A, 4 Copa do Brasil, 5 FIFA Club World Cup)
Games won	45 (8 Campeonato Paulista, 10 Copa Libertadores, 23 Série A, 2 Copa do Brasil, 2 FIFA Club World Cup)
Games drawn	16 (6 Campeonato Paulista, 1 Copa Libertadores, 7 Série A, 0 Copa do Brasil, 2 FIFA Club World Cup)
Games lost	15 (2 Campeonato Paulista, 2 Copa Libertadores, 8 Série A, 2 Copa do Brasil, 1 FIFA Club World Cup)
Goals scored	131
Goals conceded	61
Goal difference	+70 (+14 Campeonato Paulista, +20 Copa Libertadores, +33 Série A, +1 Copa do Brasil, +2 FIFA Club World Cup)
Clean sheets	34
Most clean sheets	Weverton (26)
Best result	6–0 (vs. Sporting Cristal, Copa Libertadores – May 28)
Worst result	0–3 (vs. LDU Quito, Copa Libertadores – October 23)
Yellow cards	145
Red cards	9
Top scorer	José Manuel López (25 goals)

=== Goalscorers ===
In italic players who left the team in mid-season.

Place	Position	Nationality	Number	Name	Campeonato Paulista	Copa Libertadores	Série A	Copa do Brasil	FIFA Club World Cup	Total
1	FW	(Argentina)	42	López	4	7	12	1	1	25
2	FW	(Brazil)	9	Vitor Roque	0	4	16	0	0	20
3	FW	(Brazil)	41	Estêvão	5	4	0	2	1	12
4	MF	(Brazil)	18	Maurício	5	1	3	0	1	10
4	FW	(Uruguay)	17	Torres	2	2	6	0	0	10
5	MF	(Brazil)	23	Raphael Veiga	2	3	2	0	0	7
6	DF	(Paraguay)	15	Gómez	1	2	2	1	0	6
7	MF	(Colombia)	8	Ríos	2	2	0	0	0	4
7	DF	(Uruguay)	22	Piquerez	0	1	3	0	0	4
7	MF	(Brazil)	7	Felipe Anderson	0	0	4	0	0	4
7	FW	(Paraguay)	19	Sosa	0	1	3	0	0	4
8	FW	(Brazil)	10	Paulinho	0	1	0	0	2	3
8	DF	(Brazil)	3	Bruno Fuchs	0	1	2	0	0	3
8	MF	(Brazil)	40	Allan	1	0	2	0	0	3
9	MF	(Brazil)	39	Thalys	2	0	0	0	0	2
9	DF	(Brazil)	26	Murilo	0	1	1	0	0	2
9	MF	(Brazil)	30	Lucas Evangelista	0	0	2	0	0	2
9	MF	(Brazil)	8	Andreas Pereira	0	0	2	0	0	2
9	FW	(Brazil)	11	Bruno Rodrigues	0	0	2	0	0	2
9	FW	(Brazil)	31	Luighi	1	0	1	0	0	2
10	MF	(Uruguay)	32	Martínez	0	0	1	0	0	1
10	DF	(Brazil)	43	Benedetti	0	0	1	0	0	1
