= Breno (footballer, born 2008) =

Brazilian footballer

Personal information
- Full name: Breno de Moraes Souza
- Date of birth: 25 June 2008 (age 18)
- Place of birth: Rio de Janeiro, Brazil
- Height: 1.84 m (6 ft 0 in)
- Position: Centre-back

Team information
- Current team: Red Bull Bragantino
- Number: 46

Youth career
- 2019–2025: America-RJ
- 2025–: Red Bull Bragantino

Senior career*
Years	Team	Apps	(Gls)
2026–	Red Bull Bragantino	1	(0)
- * Club domestic league appearances and goals as of 19:03, 4 May 2026 (UTC)

Breno de Moraes Souza (born 25 June 2008), known as Breno Moraes or just Breno, is a Brazilian professional footballer who plays as a centre-back for Série A club Red Bull Bragantino.

== Club career ==
Born in Rio de Janeiro, Breno began his career with hometown side America-RJ at the age of 11, and signed his first professional contract with the club on 3 July 2024. The following February, after impressing in the 2025 Copa São Paulo de Futebol Júnior, he moved to Red Bull Bragantino and was initially assigned to the under-20 team.

Breno made his first-team – and Série A – debut on 3 May 2026, coming on as a late substitute for Cauê Nascimento in a 2–1 away win over Chapecoense.

== Career statistics ==
As of 4 May 2026

Appearances and goals by club, season and competition
Club	Season	League			State league		Copa do Brasil		Continental		Other		Total	
Club	Season	Division	Apps	Goals	Apps	Goals	Apps	Goals	Apps	Goals	Apps	Goals	Apps	Goals
Red Bull Bragantino	2026	Série A	1	0	0	0	0	0	0	0	—		1	0
Career total			1	0	0	0	0	0	0	0	0	0	1	0
