= 2025 Red Bull Bragantino season =

Red Bull Bragantino
2025 season
- Manager: Fernando Seabra
- Stadium: Estádio Nabi Abi Chedid
- Série A: 10th
- Campeonato Paulista: Quarter-finals
- Copa do Brasil: Round of 16
- Top goalscorer: League: Isidro Pitta (3); All: Isidro Pitta (5)
- Average home league attendance: 4,985
Home colours	Away colours

The 2025 season was Red Bull Bragantino's 97th overall and 6th consecutive in Brazil's top division. The club also participated in the Campeonato Paulista and Copa do Brasil.

== Squad ==
=== Transfers In ===
Pos.	Player	Transferred from	Fee	Date	Source
DF	(Uruguay) Guzmán Rodríguez	(Uruguay) Peñarol	€3,900,000	3 January 2025	
FW	(Paraguay) Isidro Pitta	(Brazil) Cuiabá	Undisclosed	3 January 2025	
FW	(Brazil) Fernando	(Austria) Red Bull Salzburg	Undisclosed	5 January 2025	
MF	(Brazil) Lucas Barbosa	(Brazil) Santos	€2,500,000	6 January 2025	
MF	(Brazil) Gabriel Girotto	(Brazil) Internacional	Undisclosed	15 January 2025	
DF	(Brazil) Gustavo Marques	(Portugal) Benfica B	Loan	8 July 2025	

=== Transfers Out ===
Pos.	Player	Transferred to	Fee	Date	Source
FW	(Brazil) Talisson	(Brazil) Criciúma	Loan	4 January 2025	
FW	(Brazil) Vitinho	(Ukraine) Dynamo Kyiv	Loan return	11 January 2025	
DF	(Colombia) César Haydar	(Japan) Kawasaki Frontale	Free	20 January 2025	
FW	(Brazil) Thonny Anderson	(Japan) Tokushima Vortis	Free	20 January 2025	
FW	(Brazil) Alerrandro	(Russia) CSKA Moscow	€4,200,000	17 February 2025	
DF	(Brazil) Isac Silvestre	(Brazil) São Paulo	Undisclosed	25 February 2025	
MF	(Brazil) Sorriso	(Portugal) Famalicão	€1,500,000	1 July 2025	

== Exhibition matches ==
22 March 2025 Friendly	Red Bull Bragantino (Brazil)	1–1	(Brazil) Cruzeiro

== Competitions ==
=== Overall record ===
Competition	First match	Last match	Starting round	Final position	Record							
Competition	First match	Last match	Starting round	Final position	Pld	W	D	L	GF	GA	GD	Win %
Série A	29 March 2025	7 December 2025	Matchday 1	10th	38	14	6	18	45	57	−12	36.84
Campeonato Paulista	16 January 2025	2 March 2025	Group Stage	Quarter-Final	13	5	2	6	14	15	−1	38.46
Copa do Brasil	27 February 2025	6 August 2025	First Round	Round of 16	6	1	2	3	8	6	+2	16.67
Total					57	20	10	27	67	78	−11	35.09

Source: Competitions

=== Série A ===
==== League table ====
Pos	Team	Pld	W	D	L	GF	GA	GD	Pts	Qualification or relegation
8	São Paulo	38	14	9	15	43	47	−4	51	Qualification for Copa Sudamericana group stage
9	Grêmio	38	13	10	15	47	50	−3	49	Qualification for Copa Sudamericana group stage
10	Red Bull Bragantino	38	14	6	18	45	57	−12	48	Qualification for Copa Sudamericana group stage
11	Atlético Mineiro	38	12	12	14	43	44	−1	48	Qualification for Copa Sudamericana group stage
12	Santos	38	12	11	15	45	50	−5	47	Qualification for Copa Sudamericana group stage

Source: CBF
Rules for classification: 1) points; 2) wins; 3) goal difference; 4) goals scored; 5) head-to-head results (only between two teams); 6) fewest red cards; 7) fewest yellow cards; 8) drawing of lots.

==== Matches ====
31 March 2025 1	Red Bull Bragantino	2–2	Ceará	Bragança Paulista
20:00 UTC−3	Laquintana 45+1'; Ramires 90+3'		Pedro Raul 12'; Marllon 23'	Stadium: Estádio Nabi Abi Chedid; Attendance: 2,516

6 April 2025 2	Fluminense	2–1	Red Bull Bragantino	Rio de Janeiro
16:00 UTC−3	Lima 35'; Martinelli 90+2'	Report	Pitta 83'	Stadium: Maracanã

12 April 2025 3	Red Bull Bragantino	1–0	Botafogo	Bragança Paulista
17:00 UTC−3	Sasha 5'	Report		Stadium: Estádio Nabi Abi Chedid

16 April 2025 4	Sport	0–1	Red Bull Bragantino	Recife
19:00 UTC−3		Report	Juninho Capixaba 13'	Stadium: Estádio Adelmar da Costa Carvalho (Ilha do Retiro)

20 April 2025 5	Red Bull Bragantino	1–0	Cruzeiro	Bragança Paulista
20:30 UTC−3	Jhon Jhon 15'	Report		Stadium: Nabi Abi Chedid; Attendance: 6,916; Referee: Alex Gomes Stefano

27 April 2025 6	Santos	1–2	Red Bull Bragantino	Santos
20:30 UTC-03:00	Deivid Washington 90+4'	Report	Sasha 63'; Laquintana 83'	Stadium: Vila Belmiro; Attendance: 7,679; Referee: Raphael Claus

5 May 2025 7	Red Bull Bragantino	1–0	Mirassol	Bragança Paulista
19:00 UTC−3	Pitta 90+2'	Report		Stadium: Estádio Cícero de Souza Marques; Referee: Lucas Canetto Bellote

10 May 2025 8	Grêmio	1–1	Red Bull Bragantino	Porto Alegre
18:30 UTC−3	Amuzu 87'	Report	Pitta 89'	Stadium: Arena do Grêmio; Attendance: 15,156; Referee: Davi de Oliveira Lacerda

18 May 2025 9	Red Bull Bragantino	1–2	Palmeiras	Bragança Paulista
18:30 UTC−3	Gabriel 24'	Report	Murilo 72'; Maurício 78'	Stadium: Estádio Cícero de Souza Marques; Referee: Marcelo de Lima Henrique (Ceará)

26 May 2025 10	Red Bull Bragantino	1–0	Juventude	Bragança Paulista
20:00 UTC−3	Jhon Jhon 45+4'	Report		Stadium: Estádio Cícero de Souza Marques

31 May 2025 11	Vasco da Gama	0–2	Red Bull Bragantino	Rio de Janeiro
21:00 (UTC-3)		Report	Guilherme 2'; Pitta 34'	Stadium: Estádio Vasco da Gama (São Januário)

11 June 2025 12	Red Bull Bragantino	0–3	Bahia	Bragança Paulista
19:00 (UTC-3)		Report	Luciano Juba 40'; Guilherme 45+6' (o.g.); Araújo 74'	Stadium: Estádio Cícero de Souza Marques

13 July 2025 13	Corinthians	1–2	Red Bull Bragantino	São Paulo
19:00 UTC−3	Cacá 52'	Report	Sasha 31' (pen.); Thiago Borbas 90+7'	Stadium: Neo Química Arena; Attendance: 34,211; Referee: Bruno Arleu de Araújo

16 July 2025 14	Red Bull Bragantino	2–2	São Paulo	Bragança Paulista
21:30 UTC−3	Guzmán Rodríguez 43'; Hurtado 48'	Report	André Silva 9', 64'	Stadium: Estádio Cícero de Souza Marques; Referee: Alex Gomes Stefano

20 July 2025 15	Vitória	1–0	Red Bull Bragantino	Salvador
16:00 UTC−3	Renato Kayzer 9'	Report		Stadium: Barradão; Attendance: 35,980; Referee: Rodrigo José Pereira de Lima

23 July 2025 16	Red Bull Bragantino	1–2	Flamengo	Bragança Paulista
21:30 UTC−3	Barbosa 46'	Report	Pereira 66'; Wesley 85'	Stadium: Cícero de Souza Marques; Referee: Davi de Oliveira Lacerda

26 July 2025 17	Fortaleza	3–1	Red Bull Bragantino	Fortaleza
18:30 (UTC-3)	Deyverson 4'; Kuscevic 19'; Prior 48'		Pitta 38'	Stadium: Estádio Governador Plácido Castelo (Castelão); Referee: Wagner do Nascimento Magalhães

3 August 2025 18	Atlético Mineiro	2–1	Red Bull Bragantino	Belo Horizonte
18:30 UTC−3	Igor Gomes 7'; Natanael 81'	Report	Laquintana 77'	Stadium: Arena MRV; Attendance: 20,092; Referee: Bruno Arleu de Araújo

9 August 2025 19	Red Bull Bragantino	1–3	Internacional	Bragança Paulista
18:30	Pitta 55'	Report	Ricardo Mathias 7', 46'; Alan Patrick 33' (pen.)	Stadium: Cícero de Souza Marques; Attendance: 3,197; Referee: Felipe Fernandes de Lima

16 August 2025 20	Ceará	1–0	Red Bull Bragantino	Fortaleza
16:00 UTC−3	Aylon 14'	Report		Stadium: Castelão

23 August 2025 21	Red Bull Bragantino	4–2	Fluminense	Bragança Paulista
16:00 UTC−3	Jhon Jhon 2'; Sasha 4'; Laquintana 48'; Davi Gomes 81'	Report	Hércules 45+2'; Acosta 63'	Stadium: Cícero de Souza Marques

30 August 2025 22	Botafogo	4–1	Red Bull Bragantino	Rio de Janeiro
18:30 UTC−3	Danilo 6'; Newton 33'; Savarino 45+2'; Montoro 90+2'	Report	Jhon Jhon 15'	Stadium: Nilton Santos; Attendance: 13,168

14 September 2025 23	Red Bull Bragantino	1–1	Sport	Bragança Paulista
11:00 (UTC-3)	Eduardo Sasha 57' (pen.)	Report	Derik Lacerda 90+3'	Stadium: Estádio Nabi Abi Chedid; Attendance: 3,564; Referee: Anderson Daronco

21 September 2025 24	Cruzeiro	2–1	Red Bull Bragantino	Belo Horizonte
20:30 UTC−3	Lucas Silva 45+2'; Kaiki Bruno 77'	Report	Jhon Jhon 26'	Stadium: Mineirão; Attendance: 35,726; Referee: Lucas Paulo Torezin

28 September 2025 25	Red Bull Bragantino	2–2	Santos	Bragança Paulista
18:30 UTC-03:00	Lucas Barbosa 30'; Pedro Henrique 77'	Report	56' Lautaro Díaz; 60' Barreal	Stadium: Estádio Cícero de Souza Marques; Attendance: 5,744; Referee: Flávio Rodrigues de Souza

1 October 2025 26	Mirassol	1–1	Red Bull Bragantino	Mirassol
18:30 (UTC-3)	Reinaldo 75'	Report	Ramires 26'	Stadium: Estádio José Maria de Campos Maia

4 October 2025 27	Red Bull Bragantino	1–0	Grêmio	Bragança Paulista
18:30 UTC−3	Jhon Jhon 90+16' (pen.)	Report		Stadium: Estádio Cícero de Souza Marques; Attendance: 3,861; Referee: Lucas Casagrande

15 October 2025 28	Palmeiras	5–1	Red Bull Bragantino	São Paulo
19:00 UTC−3	Bruno Fuchs 45+5'; Vitor Roque 58', 89'; Felipe Anderson 73'; López 84'	Report	Jhon Jhon 38' (pen.)	Stadium: Allianz Parque; Attendance: 29,169; Referee: Raphael Claus

20 October 2025 29	Juventude	1–0	Red Bull Bragantino	Caxias do Sul
19:00 UTC−3	Peixoto 40'	Report		Stadium: Estádio Alfredo Jaconi; Attendance: 5,037

26 October 2025 30	Red Bull Bragantino	0–3	Vasco da Gama	Bragança Paulista
18:30 UTC−3		Report	Vegetti 27', 69'; GB 89'	Stadium: Estádio Cícero de Souza Marques; Attendance: 6,247

2 November 2025 31	Bahia	2–1	Red Bull Bragantino	Salvador
15:00 (UTC-3)	Willian José 75', 90'	Report	Matheus Fernandes 20'	Stadium: Arena Fonte Nova; Attendance: 43,129

5 November 2025 32	Red Bull Bragantino	2–1	Corinthians	Bragança Paulista
19:00 UTC−3	Sasha 45+3' (pen.); Pitta 90+2'	Report	Yuri Alberto 66'	Stadium: Estádio Cícero de Souza Marques; Referee: Edina Alves Batista

8 November 2025 33	São Paulo	0–1	Red Bull Bragantino	Santos
21:00 UTC−3		Report	Jhon Jhon 75'	Stadium: Vila Belmiro; Attendance: 10,086; Referee: Bruno Arleu de Araújo

16 November 2025 37	Red Bull Bragantino	2–0	Atlético Mineiro	Bragança Paulista
19:00 UTC−3	Lucas Barbosa 55'; Gustavo Marques 59'	Report		Stadium: Estádio Cícero de Souza Marques; Attendance: 4,472; Referee: Marcelo de Lima Henrique

22 November 2025 35	Flamengo	3–0	Red Bull Bragantino	Rio de Janeiro
21:30 UTC−3	de Arrascaeta 50'; Jorginho 64' (pen.); Bruno Henrique 72'	Report		Stadium: Maracanã; Attendance: 68,408; Referee: Fernando Antonio Mendes

26 November 2025 36	Red Bull Bragantino	0–1	Fortaleza	Bragança Paulista
19:00 (UTC-3)		Report	Bareiro 76'	Stadium: Estádio Cícero de Souza Marques

3 December 2025 34	Red Bull Bragantino	4–0	Vitória	Bragança Paulista
19:00 (UTC-3)	Eduardo Sasha 6', 8'; Lucas Barbosa 51'; Jhon Jhon 65'	Report		Stadium: Estádio Cícero de Souza Marques; Attendance: 2,755; Referee: Wagner do Nascimento Magalhães

7 December 2025 38	Internacional	3–1	Red Bull Bragantino	Porto Alegre
16:00 (UTC-3)	Mercado 50'; Alan Patrick 77' (pen.); Carbonero 81'	Report	Jhon Jhon 87'	Stadium: Beira-Rio; Attendance: 21,710; Referee: Davi de Oliveira Lacerda

=== Campeonato Paulista ===
==== Results by round ====
Round	1	2
Ground	H	A
Result	L	L
Position		

Updated to match(es) played on 19 January 2025. Source:
A = Away; H = Home; W = Win; D = Draw; L = Loss

16 January 2025 1	Red Bull Bragantino	1–2	Corinthians	Bragança Paulista
19:30 UTC−3	Lucas Evangelista 9'		Talles Magno 50'; Pedro Raul 79'	Stadium: Estádio Nabi Abi Chedid

19 January 2025 2	São Bernardo	3–2	Red Bull Bragantino	São Bernardo do Campo
16:00 UTC−3				Stadium: Estádio 1º de Maio

22 January 2025 3	Red Bull Bragantino	v	Velo Clube	Bragança Paulista
18:30 UTC−3				Stadium: Estádio Nabi Abi Chedid

==== Knockout stage ====
2 March 2025 Quarter-final	Santos	2–0	Red Bull Bragantino	Santos
20:45 UTC-03:00	Neymar 9'; João Schmidt 56'	Report		Stadium: Vila Belmiro; Attendance: 14,832; Referee: Raphael Claus

=== Copa do Brasil ===
27 February 2025 First Round	Sousa	1–1 (4–5 p)	Red Bull Bragantino	Sousa
21:30	Augusto 53'	Report	Patrik 90+10' (o.g.)	Stadium: Marizão; Attendance: 3,086; Referee: Caio Max Augusto Vieira (Goiás)

11 March 2025 Second Round	Red Bull Bragantino	1–1 (4–2 p)	São José-RS	Bragança Paulista
21:30	Jhon Jhon 5'	Report	Lailson 48'	Stadium: Estádio Nabi Abi Chedid; Attendance: 1,760; Referee: Rodrigo José Pereira de Lima (Pernambuco)
	Penalties
	Eduardo Sasha (penalty scored); Fernando (penalty scored); Jhon Jhon (penalty scored); Cleiton (penalty scored)		(penalty missed) Fábio; (penalty scored) Giovane; (penalty missed) Danielzinho; (penalty scored) Douglas

==== Third round ====
The draw was held on 9 April 2025.

1 May 2025 First leg	Criciúma	1–0	Red Bull Bragantino	Criciúma
18:30 UTC−3	Matheus Trindade 54'	Report		Stadium: Heriberto Hülse; Referee: Felipe Fernandes de Lima

22 May 2025 Second leg	Red Bull Bragantino	6–0 (6–1 agg.)	Criciúma	Bragança Paulista
21:30 UTC−3	Eduardo Sasha 8' (pen.); Lucas Barbosa 21' (pen.), 52', 67'; Borbas 61', 87'	Report		Stadium: Nabi Abi Chedid; Referee: Wilton Sampaio

==== Round of 16 ====
29 July 2025 First leg	Botafogo	2–0	Red Bull Bragantino	Rio de Janeiro
19:00 UTC−3	Montoro 16'; Barboza 32'	Report		Stadium: Estádio Nilton Santos; Referee: Anderson Daronco

6 August 2025 Second leg	Red Bull Bragantino	0–1 (0–3 agg.)	Botafogo	Bragança Paulista
19:00 UTC−3		Report	Savarino 54'	Stadium: Cícero de Souza Marques; Attendance: 3,876; Referee: Rodrigo José Pereira de Lima
