= Ignacio Sosa =

Uruguayan football player (born 2003)

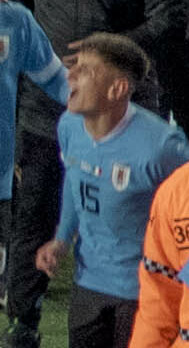
- Sosa with Uruguay U20 in 2023

Personal information
- Full name: Ignacio Sosa Ospital
- Date of birth: 31 August 2003 (age 23)
- Place of birth: Montevideo, Uruguay
- Height: 1.75 m (5 ft 9 in)
- Position: Midfielder

Team information
- Current team: Red Bull Bragantino
- Number: 15

Youth career
- Fénix

Senior career*
Years	Team	Apps	(Gls)
2021–2023	Fénix	47	(1)
2023–2025	Peñarol	53	(2)
2026–	Red Bull Bragantino	24	(1)

International career
2021–2023	Uruguay U20	40	(2)
Medal record
Men's football
Representing Uruguay
FIFA U-20 World Cup
Winner	2023 Argentina
South American U-20 Championship
Runner-up	2023 Colombia
- * Club domestic league appearances and goals as of 9 August 2026

Ignacio Sosa Ospital (born 31 August 2003) is a Uruguayan professional footballer who plays as a midfielder for Campeonato Brasileiro Série A club Red Bull Bragantino.

== Club career ==
Sosa is a youth academy graduate of Fénix. He made his professional debut for the club on 3 July 2021 in a 2–1 league win against Cerro Largo. He joined Peñarol in July 2023.

On 27 December 2025, Brazilian club Red Bull Bragantino announced the signing of Sosa on a five-year contract until December 2030. He scored his first goal for the club on 18 January 2026 in a 5–0 win against Botafogo-SP.

== International career ==
As a youth international, Sosa has represented Uruguay at the under-20 level. On 23 October 2021, he was named in the Uruguay under-20 squad for friendlies against Costa Rica and Honduras. He was a part of the Uruguayan side that won the 2023 FIFA U-20 World Cup in Argentina.

== Career statistics ==
As of match played 29 July 2026

Appearances and goals by club, season and competition
Club	Season	League			State league		Cup (Note: Includes Copa Uruguay, Copa do Brasil)		Continental		Other		Total	
Club	Season	Division	Apps	Goals	Apps	Goals	Apps	Goals	Apps	Goals	Apps	Goals	Apps	Goals
Fénix	2021	Liga AUF Uruguaya	13	0	—		—		0	0	—		13	0
Fénix	2022	Liga AUF Uruguaya	24	1	—		0	0	—		—		24	1
Fénix	2023	Liga AUF Uruguaya	10	0	—		0	0	—		—		10	0
Fénix	Total		47	1	0	0	0	0	0	0	0	0	47	1
Peñarol	2023	Liga AUF Uruguaya	7	0	—		2	0	0	0	2 (Note: Appearances in championship play-offs)	0	11	0
Peñarol	2024	Liga AUF Uruguaya	15	0	—		—		5 (Note: Appearances in Copa Libertadores)	0	0	0	20	0
Peñarol	2025	Liga AUF Uruguaya	31	2	—		2	0	8	0	4 (Note: Three appearances in championship playoffs, one appearance in Torneo Intermedio final)	0	45	2
Peñarol	Total		53	2	0	0	4	0	13	0	6	0	76	2
Red Bull Bragantino	2026	Série A	15	0	9	1	1	0	4 (Note: Appearances in Copa Sudamericana)	0	—		29	1
Career total			115	3	9	1	5	0	17	0	6	0	152	4

== Honours ==
Peñarol

- Uruguayan Primera División: 2024
- Copa Uruguay: 2025

Uruguay U20

- FIFA U-20 World Cup: 2023
- South American U-20 Championship runner-up: 2023

Individual

- Liga AUF Uruguaya team of the year: 2025
