= Thalys (footballer) =

Brazilian footballer (born 2005)

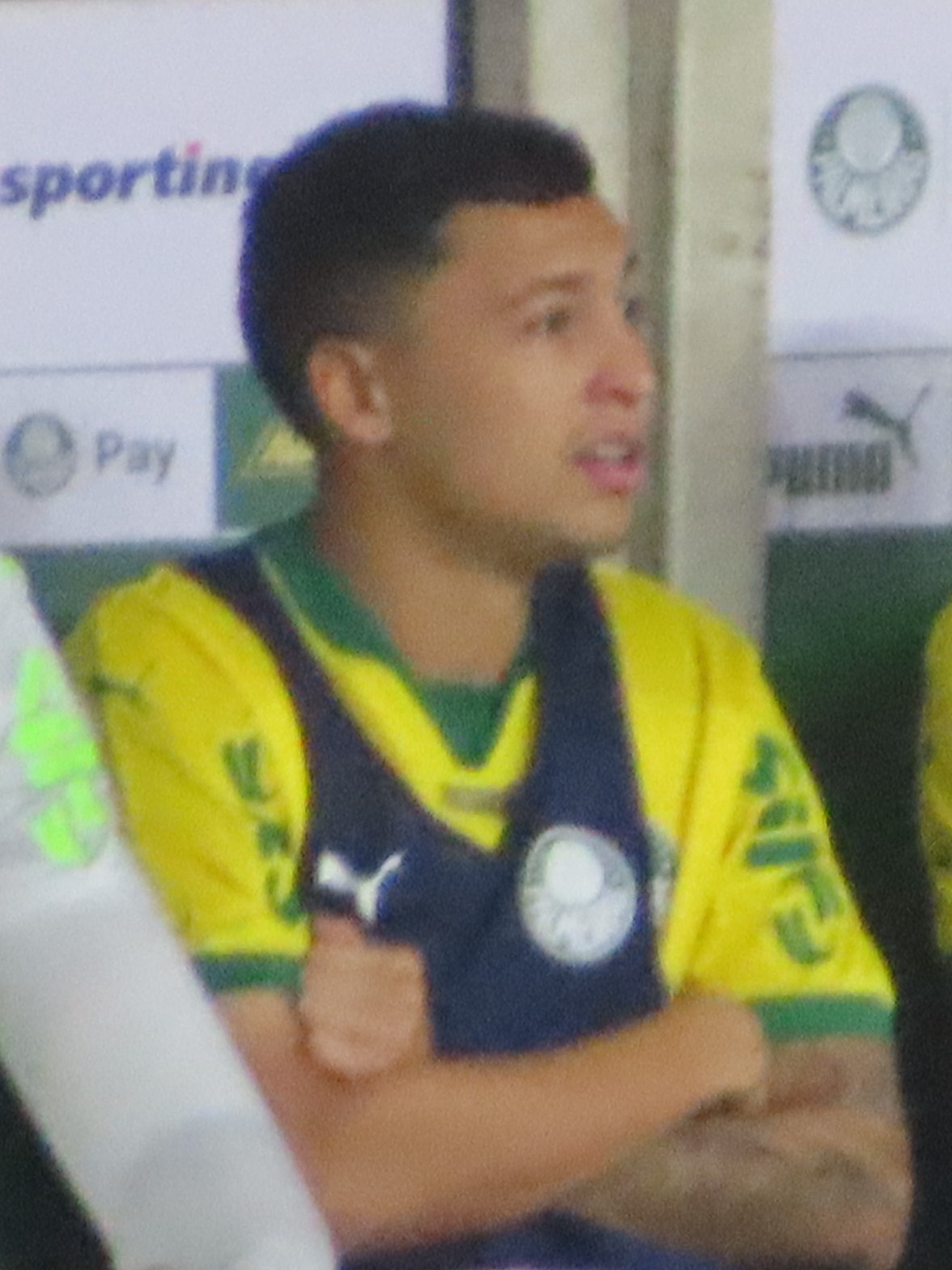
- Thalys with Palmeiras in 2025

Personal information
- Full name: Thalys Henrique Gomes de Araújo
- Date of birth: 22 February 2005 (age 21)
- Place of birth: São Miguel dos Campos, Brazil
- Height: 1.83 m (6 ft 0 in)
- Position: Forward

Team information
- Current team: Almería
- Number: 9

Youth career
- 2017–2020: CRB
- 2021–2025: Palmeiras

Senior career*
Years	Team	Apps	(Gls)
2025	Palmeiras	13	(2)
2025–	Almería	25	(3)
- * Club domestic league appearances and goals as of 3 June 2026

Thalys Henrique Gomes de Araújo (born 22 February 2005), simply known as Thalys, is a Brazilian professional footballer who plays as a forward for Segunda División club UD Almería.

== Career ==
=== Early career ===
Born in Alagoas, Thalys began his career in the youth sectors of the CRB. In 2021 he was hired by SE Palmeiras, where he stood out in the under-17 category, being the top scorer in the 2022 Copa do Brasil Sub-17. In 2024, in the under-20 category, he was once again top scorer in a national competition, this time in the Brazilian Championship.

=== Palmeiras ===
Thalys made his first professional match with Palmeiras in the debut of the 2025 season, against Portuguesa. In the following game, against EC Noroeste, he scored his first goal for the main team.

Thalys made his Série A debut on 18 May 2025, in a 2–1 away win over Red Bull Bragantino.

=== Almería ===
On 1 September 2025, Thalys signed a six-year contract with Spanish Segunda División side UD Almería.

== Honours ==
Palmeiras U20

- Copa São Paulo de Futebol Júnior: 2023
- Campeonato Brasileiro Sub-20: 2024, 2025
- Campeonato Paulista Sub-20: 2023

Palmeiras U17

- Campeonato Brasileiro Sub-17: 2022
- Copa do Brasil Sub-17: 2022
- Campeonato Paulista Sub-17: 2022

Individual

- 2024 Campeonato Brasileiro Sub-20 top scorer: 13 goals
