= Cauê (footballer, born 2006) =

Brazilian footballer

Personal information
- Full name: Cauê Nascimento Santos
- Date of birth: 13 December 2006 (age 19)
- Place of birth: São Paulo, Brazil
- Position: Left-back

Team information
- Current team: Red Bull Bragantino
- Number: 51

Youth career
- 2022: São-Carlense
- 2023: Referência
- 2023–: Red Bull Bragantino

Senior career*
Years	Team	Apps	(Gls)
2025–	Red Bull Bragantino	8	(0)
- * Club domestic league appearances and goals as of 7 April 2026

Cauê Nascimento Santos (born 13 December 2006), known as Cauê Nascimento or just Cauê, is a Brazilian professional footballer who plays as a left-back for Série A club Red Bull Bragantino.

== Club career ==
Born in São Paulo, Cauê joined Red Bull Bragantino's youth sides in 2023, after playing for Referência FC and São-Carlense. On 12 March 2024, he signed his first professional contract with the club.

Cauê made his first team – and Série A – debut on 3 August 2025; after coming on as a second-half substitute for Andrés Hurtado, he provided the assist to Ignacio Laquintana's equalizer in a 2–1 away loss to Atlético Mineiro. Three days later, he made his first start in a 1–0 Copa do Brasil home loss to Botafogo.

== Career statistics ==
As of 19 August 2025

Appearances and goals by club, season and competition
Club	Season	League			State league		Copa do Brasil		Continental		Other		Total	
Club	Season	Division	Apps	Goals	Apps	Goals	Apps	Goals	Apps	Goals	Apps	Goals	Apps	Goals
Red Bull Bragantino	2025	Série A	1	0	—		1	0	0	0	—		2	0
Career total			1	0	0	0	1	0	0	0	0	0	2	0
