= Marcelinho (footballer, born 2004) =

Brazilian footballer

Personal information
- Full name: Marcelo Braz da Silva
- Date of birth: 16 August 2004 (age 22)
- Place of birth: Jaguariúna, Brazil
- Position: Forward

Team information
- Current team: Red Bull Bragantino
- Number: 57

Youth career
- 2018: Cruzeiro
- 2019–2022: Ponte Preta
- 2022–2025: Red Bull Bragantino

Senior career*
Years	Team	Apps	(Gls)
2023–2024	Red Bull Bragantino II	20	(1)
2025–	Red Bull Bragantino	6	(1)
- * Club domestic league appearances and goals as of 04:15, 6 May 2026 (UTC)

Marcelo Braz da Silva (born 16 August 2004), known as Marcelinho Braz or just Marcelinho, is a Brazilian professional footballer who plays as a forward for Série A club Red Bull Bragantino.

== Club career ==
Born in Jaguariúna, São Paulo, Marcelinho joined Red Bull Bragantino's youth sides in 2022, from Ponte Preta. He started to play with reserve team Red Bull Bragantino II in the following, while also playing for the under-20 squad.

Marcelinho made his first team debut on 6 August 2025, coming on as a second-half substitute for Ignacio Laquintana in a 1–0 home loss to Botafogo. A permanent member of the main squad afterwards, he scored his first professional goal on 18 January 2026, netting his side's fifth in a 5–0 Campeonato Paulista home routing of Botafogo-SP.

== Career statistics ==
As of 6 May 2026

Appearances and goals by club, season and competition
Club	Season	League			State league		Copa do Brasil		Continental		Other		Total	
Club	Season	Division	Apps	Goals	Apps	Goals	Apps	Goals	Apps	Goals	Apps	Goals	Apps	Goals
Red Bull Bragantino II	2023	Paulista A3	—		9	0	—		—		9 (Note: Appearance(s) in Copa Paulista)	1	18	1
Red Bull Bragantino II	2024	Paulista A3	—		11	0	—		—		8	0	19	0
Red Bull Bragantino II	Total		—		20	0	—		—		17	1	37	1
Red Bull Bragantino	2025	Série A	0	0	0	0	1	0	—		—		1	0
Red Bull Bragantino	2026	Série A	3	0	3	1	1	0	2 (Note: Appearance(s) in Copa Sudamericana)	0	—		9	1
Red Bull Bragantino	Total		3	0	3	1	2	0	2	0	—		10	1
Career total			3	0	23	1	2	0	2	0	17	1	47	2
