= Gustavo Marques =

Brazilian footballer (born 2001)

Personal information
- Full name: Gustavo Marques Alves dos Santos
- Date of birth: 9 October 2001 (age 25)
- Place of birth: Belo Horizonte, Brazil
- Height: 1.89 m (6 ft 2 in)
- Position: Centre-back

Team information
- Current team: Red Bull Bragantino
- Number: 16

Youth career
- 2017–2021: América Mineiro

Senior career*
Years	Team	Apps	(Gls)
2020–2024	América Mineiro	9	(1)
2020–2021	→ Luverdense (loan)	5	(0)
2022–2023	→ Torreense (loan)	26	(3)
2023–2024	→ Benfica B (loan)	31	(1)
2023–2024	→ Benfica (loan)	1	(0)
2024–2026	Benfica B	32	(1)
2024–2026	Benfica	0	(0)
2025–2026	→ Red Bull Bragantino (loan)	36	(3)
2026–	Red Bull Bragantino	13	(1)
- * Club domestic league appearances and goals as of 14:57, 10 November 2026 (UTC)

Gustavo Marques Alves dos Santos (born 9 October 2001), known as Gustavo Marques, is a Brazilian professional footballer who plays as a centre-back for Red Bull Bragantino.

== Club career ==
=== América Mineiro ===
Born in Belo Horizonte, Minas Gerais, Gustavo Marques joined América Mineiro's youth setup in 2017. On 4 December 2020, he was loaned to Luverdense until the following February.

Upon returning, Gustavo Marques was assigned back to the under-20s, but was promoted to the first team in December 2021. He made his senior debut on 25 January 2022, starting in a 1–2 Campeonato Mineiro away loss against Caldense.

On 10 March 2022, Gustavo Marques renewed his contract until December 2024. He scored his first senior goal thirteen days later, netting his team's only in a 1–3 loss at Tombense.

Gustavo Marques made his Série A debut on 29 May 2022, coming on as a half-time substitute for Iago Maidana in a 1–1 away draw against Corinthians. In August, however, he was loaned to Portuguese side Torreense, for one year.

=== Benfica ===
On 18 July 2023, Gustavo Marques moved to Benfica and was initially assigned to the B-team, also on loan. On 5 July of the following year, after already playing for the first team and being an undisputed starter for the B's, he signed a permanent deal.

=== Red Bull Bragantino ===
On 8 July 2025, Gustavo Marques returned to his home country after agreeing to a one-year loan deal with Red Bull Bragantino. On 5 March 2026, he was suspended for 12 games in state-level competitions and fined R$ 30,000 ($5,700) over sexist remarks he made against a female referee in a match the previous month.

On 26 June 2026, Gustavo Marques signed a permanent contract with Bragantino until June 2030, for a rumoured fee of € 3.5 million.

== Career statistics ==
As of match played 30 December 2023

Club	Season	League			State league (Note: Includes Campeonato Mato-Grossense, Campeonato Mineiro, Campeonato Paulista)		National cup (Note: Includes Copa do Brasil, Taça de Portugal)		Continental		Other		Total	
Club	Season	Division	Apps	Goals	Apps	Goals	Apps	Goals	Apps	Goals	Apps	Goals	Apps	Goals
Luverdense	2020	Mato-Grossense	—		5	0	—		—		—		5	0
América Mineiro	2022	Série A	1	0	8	1	0	0	—		—		9	1
Torreense	2022–23	Liga Portugal 2	26	3	—		1	0	—		3 (Note: Appearance(s) in Taça da Liga)	0	30	3
Benfica B	2023–24	Liga Portugal 2	31	1	—		—		—		—		31	1
Benfica B	2024–25	Liga Portugal 2	32	1	—		—		—		—		32	1
Benfica B	Total		63	2	—		—		—		—		63	2
Benfica	2023–24	Primeira Liga	1	0	—		0	0	0	0	0	0	1	0
Red Bull Bragantino	2025	Série A	14	1	—		2	0	—		—		16	1
Red Bull Bragantino	2026	Série A	29	1	6	2	2	0	7 (Note: Appearance(s) in Copa Sudamericana)	1	—		44	4
Red Bull Bragantino	Total		43	2	6	2	4	0	7	1	—		60	5
Career total			135	7	19	3	5	0	7	1	3	0	168	11

== Honours ==
Individual

- Liga Portugal 2 Defender of the Month: January 2024
