= Luiz Benedetti =

Brazilian footballer (born 2006)

- Benedetti with Palmeiras in 2026

Personal information
- Full name: Luiz Gustavo Roncholeta Benedetti
- Date of birth: 7 June 2006 (age 20)
- Place of birth: Bauru, Brazil
- Height: 1.98 m (6 ft 6 in)
- Position: Centre-back

Team information
- Current team: Palmeiras
- Number: 43

Youth career
- 2017: Noroeste
- 2019: Catanduva
- 2020–2022: Ferroviária
- 2022–: Palmeiras

Senior career*
Years	Team	Apps	(Gls)
2025–	Palmeiras	15	(1)
- * Club domestic league appearances and goals as of 7 April 2026

Luiz Gustavo Roncholeta Benedetti (born 7 June 2006), simply known as Benedetti, is a Brazilian professional footballer who plays as a centre-back for Palmeiras.

== Career ==
Born in Bauru, São Paulo, Benedetti began his career in the youth sectors of hometown side Noroeste. He also played for Catanduva and Ferroviária in youth categories, being a spotlight of the latter club in the under-15 state championship and being signed by Palmeiras afterwards. In 2025, he was promoted to the main team, debuting in the 2–0 win over Portuguesa on 16 January.

== Career statistics ==
As of 14 February 2025

Appearances and goals by club, season and competition
Club	Season	League			Paulista		Copa do Brasil		Continental		Other		Total	
Club	Season	Division	Apps	Goals	Apps	Goals	Apps	Goals	Apps	Goals	Apps	Goals	Apps	Goals
Palmeiras	2025	Série A	0	0	4	0	0	0	0	0	—		4	0
Career total			0	0	4	0	0	0	0	0	0	0	4	0

== Honours ==
Palmeiras U20

- Campeonato Brasileiro Sub-20: 2024, 2025

Palmeiras U17

- Campeonato Brasileiro Sub-17: 2022, 2023
- Copa do Brasil Sub-17: 2023
- Campeonato Paulista Sub-17: 2022
