= Davi Gomes =

Brazilian footballer (born 2005)

Personal information
- Full name: Davi Gomes de Alvarenga
- Date of birth: 6 June 2005 (age 21)
- Place of birth: Rio de Janeiro, Brazil
- Height: 1.72 m (5 ft 8 in)
- Position: Forward

Team information
- Current team: Red Bull Bragantino
- Number: 27

Youth career
- 2018–2019: Fluminense
- 2020–2021: America-RJ
- 2021–2022: Atlético Mineiro
- 2023–2024: Água Santa
- 2025–: Red Bull Bragantino

Senior career*
Years	Team	Apps	(Gls)
2024–2025	Água Santa	11	(1)
2025–	Red Bull Bragantino	12	(2)
- * Club domestic league appearances and goals as of 7 April 2026

Davi Gomes de Alvarenga (born 6 June 2005), known as Davi Gomes, is a Brazilian professional footballer who plays as a forward for Série A club Red Bull Bragantino.

== Career ==
Born in Rio de Janeiro, Davi Gomes began his career with the futsal side of Fluminense. Released by the club after switching to football in 2019, he played for America-RJ before joining Atlético Mineiro's youth sides in October 2021.

In 2023, Davi Gomes moved to the youth sides of Água Santa, and made his first team debut on 17 June 2024, coming on as a late substitute for goalscorer Luquinhas in a 1–0 Série D home win over Pouso Alegre. He started to feature more regularly for the side in the 2025 Campeonato Paulista, and scored his first senior goal on 19 February of that year, in a 2–2 home draw against Inter de Limeira.

On 11 April 2025, Davi Gomes signed a five-year contract with Red Bull Bragantino, being initially assigned to the under-20 team.

== Career statistics ==
As of match played 9 August 2025

Appearances and goals by club, season and competition
Club	Season	League			State league (Note: Includes Campeonato Paulista)		Copa do Brasil		Continental		Other		Total	
Club	Season	Division	Apps	Goals	Apps	Goals	Apps	Goals	Apps	Goals	Apps	Goals	Apps	Goals
Água Santa	2024	Série D	2	0	—		—		—		—		2	0
Água Santa	2025	Série D	0	0	9	1	—		—		—		9	1
Água Santa	Total		2	0	9	1	0	0	0	0	0	0	11	1
Red Bull Bragantino	2025	Série A	2	0	—		1	0	—		—		3	0
Career total			4	0	9	1	1	0	0	0	0	0	14	1
