= Caue =

Caue may refer to:

== People ==
- Cauê Benicio (born 1978), Brazilian midfielder
- Cauê Macris (born 1983), Brazilian politician
- Cauê (footballer, born 1986), Cauê Santos da Mata, Brazilian football midfielder
- Cauê (footballer, born 1987), Roberto Carvalho Cauê, Brazilian football defender
- Caue Fernandes (born 1988), Brazilian football defender
- Cauê (footballer, born 1989), Cauê Cecilio da Silva, Brazilian football midfielder
- Cauê (footballer, born 2002), Cauê Vinícius dos Santos, Brazilian football forward

== Other uses ==
- Caué District, district of São Tomé and Príncipe
- Cauê (mascot), mascot for the 2007 Pan American Games
