= Alix Vinicius =

Brazilian footballer (born 1999)

Personal information
- Full name: Alix Vinicius de Souza Sampaio
- Date of birth: 6 November 1999 (age 27)
- Place of birth: Simões Filho, Brazil
- Height: 1.95 m (6 ft 5 in)
- Position: Centre back

Team information
- Current team: Red Bull Bragantino
- Number: 4

Youth career
- Tigres do Brasil

Senior career*
Years	Team	Apps	(Gls)
2019	Tigres do Brasil	8	(2)
2020–2021	Artsul	11	(1)
2021	→ Cabofriense (loan)	9	(2)
2021	→ Fortaleza (loan)	1	(0)
2022–2023	Fortaleza	0	(0)
2023	→ Volta Redonda (loan)	13	(1)
2023	→ Atlético Goianiense (loan)	18	(2)
2024–2025	Atlético Goianiense	75	(6)
2025	→ Red Bull Bragantino (loan)	11	(0)
2026–	Red Bull Bragantino	13	(0)
- * Club domestic league appearances and goals as of 7 April 2026

Alix Vinicius de Souza Sampaio (born 6 November 1999), known as Alix Vinicius, is a Brazilian professional footballer who plays as a central defender for Red Bull Bragantino.

== Career ==
Born in Simões Filho, Bahia, Alix Vinicius began his career with Tigres do Brasil, making his first team debut in the 2019 Campeonato Carioca Série B1. Ahead of the 2020 season, he moved to Artsul, before moving to Cabofriense on loan in January 2021.

In April 2021, Alix Vinicius moved to Série A side Fortaleza; initially on loan, he was assigned to the under-23 squad before signing a permanent deal for the 2022 season. After failing to make his breakthrough into the first team, he moved to Volta Redonda on loan on 5 January 2023.

Back to the Leão do Pici on 31 March 2023, Alix Vinicius was only an unused substitute before being loaned out to Série B side Atlético Goianiense on 14 July. On 12 January 2024, after helping the latter side in their promotion to the top tier, he signed a permanent contract for a fee of R$ 3.5 million for 50% of his economic rights.

== Career statistics ==
As of 5 February 2024

Club	Season	League			State League		Cup		Continental		Other		Total	
Club	Season	Division	Apps	Goals	Apps	Goals	Apps	Goals	Apps	Goals	Apps	Goals	Apps	Goals
Tigres do Brasil	2019	Carioca Série B1	—		8	2	—		—		2 (Note: Appearance(s) in Copa Rio)	0	10	2
Artsul	2020	Carioca Série B1	—		11	1	—		—		—		11	1
Cabofriense (loan)	2021	Carioca	—		9	2	—		—		—		9	2
Fortaleza	2021	Série A	0	0	1	0	0	0	—		—		1	0
Fortaleza	2022	Série A	0	0	0	0	0	0	—		0	0	0	0
Fortaleza	2023	Série A	0	0	0	0	—		0	0	0	0	0	0
Fortaleza	Subtotal		0	0	1	0	0	0	0	0	0	0	1	0
Volta Redonda (loan)	2023	Série C	0	0	13	1	2	0	—		—		15	1
Atlético Goianiense	2023	Série B	18	2	—		—		—		—		18	2
Atlético Goianiense	2024	Série A	0	0	5	0	0	0	—		—		5	0
Atlético Goianiense	Subtotal		18	2	5	0	0	0	—		—		23	2
Career total			18	2	47	6	2	0	0	0	2	0	137	11
