= Estádio Nabi Abi Chedid =

Football stadium in Bragança Paulista, Brazil

Coordinates: 22°57′55.49″S 46°32′12.97″W

- Nabizão
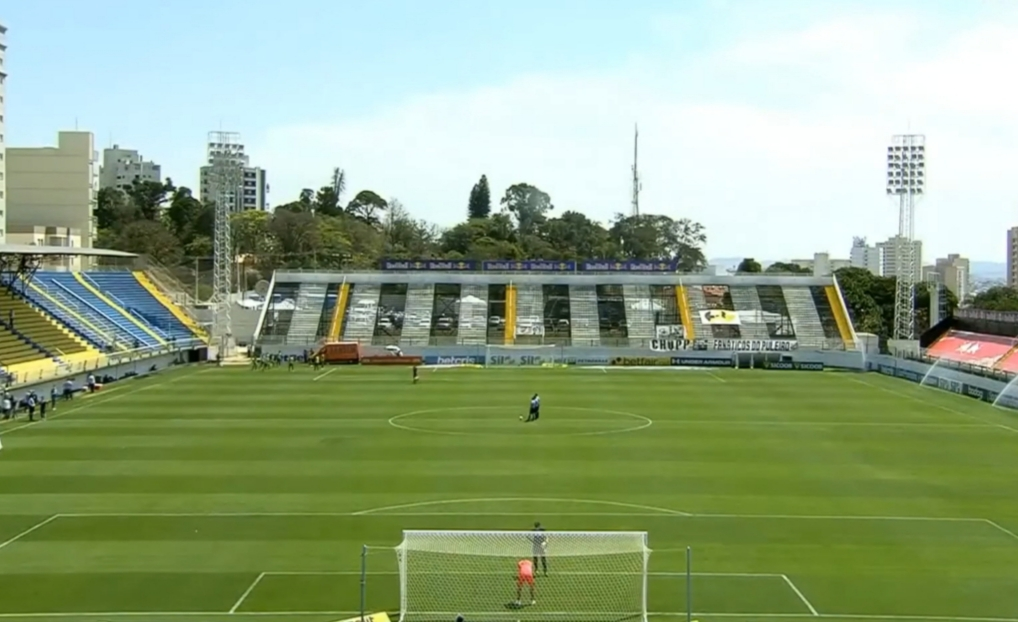
- Sisbrace
- Interactive map of Estádio Nabi Abi Chedid
- Full name: Estádio Nabi Abi Chedid
- Former names: Estádio Parque das Pedras; Estádio das Pedras; Estádio Marcelo Stéfani (–2009)
- Location: Bragança Paulista, SP, Brazil
- Owner: Red Bull Bragantino
- Capacity: 17,022; 12,452 (international)
- Surface: Grass
- Field size: 105 x 68m

Construction
- Opened: 1949

Tenants
- Red Bull Bragantino; Red Bull Brasil

Estádio Nabi Abi Chedid, also known as Nabizão, was a football stadium in Bragança Paulista, São Paulo state, Brazil. The stadium holds 17,724 people. It was built in 1949. The stadium was owned by Red Bull Bragantino, and its formal name honors Nabi Abi Chedid, who was the father of president of Bragantino Marco Antônio Abi Chedid, and a former president of the club. It was previously named Estádio Marcelo Stéfani, its former name honored Marcelo Stéfani, who was a player, and a president of Bragantino. As Estádio Marcelo Stéfani, the stadium was also known by the nickname Marcelão. It was deactivated in 2025, when owners of the club decided to demolish it and build a new and modern arena in its place.

== History ==
The stadium was built in 32 days, after a popular movement led by the club's president Nabi Abi Chedid. It was initially named Estádio Parque das Pedras, then just Estádio das Pedras. The inaugural match was played in 1949, when Bragantino beat Mogina of Campinas 2–1. The first goal of the stadium was scored by Bragantino's Sacadura.

The stadium's attendance record currently stands at 15,000 people, set on 26 August 1990 when Bragantino and Novorizontino drew 1–1. This match was one of the legs of the Campeonato Paulista final of that year.

The second leg of the Campeonato Brasileiro Série A final between Bragantino and São Paulo was played on 9 June 1991 at the stadium. The match ended in a 0–0 draw, and São Paulo won the championship. The match attendance was 12,492 people, which is the lowest attendance ever in a Campeonato Brasileiro final.

The stadium was renamed to Estádio Nabi Abi Chedid on 6 January 2009. It was formerly named Estádio Marcelo Stéfani. The name change was badly received by the Bragança Paulista population.

On 20 April 2025, the "Massa Bruta" (Bragantino's nickname) played its last match at the stadium before the demolition. They beat Cruzeiro 1-0, and Jhon Jhon scored the Nabizão's last goal ever.

== See also ==
- List of football stadiums in Brazil
- Lists of stadiums
