= Talisson de Almeida =

Brazilian footballer

Talisson
Personal information
- Full name: Talisson de Almeida
- Date of birth: 21 May 2002 (age 24)
- Place of birth: Abaré, Brazil
- Height: 1.88 m (6 ft 2 in)
- Position: Forward

Team information
- Current team: Rapid București
- Number: 33

Youth career
- –2020: Jaguariúna
- 2021: Batistense
- 2022: Itapirense
- 2022: → Red Bull Bragantino (loan)

Senior career*
Years	Team	Apps	(Gls)
2023–2026	Red Bull Bragantino	11	(3)
2024	→ Ceará (loan)	10	(0)
2025	→ Criciúma (loan)	3	(0)
2025	→ Atlético Goianiense (loan)	12	(0)
2026	→ Avaí (loan)	0	(0)
2026–	Rapid București	11	(0)
- * Club domestic league appearances and goals as of 4 May 2026

Talisson de Almeida (born 21 May 2002), simply known as Talisson, is a Brazilian professional footballer who plays as a forward for Liga I club Rapid București.

== Club career ==
Born in Abaré, Bahia, Talisson played for Jaguariúna's youth categories before joining Atlético Batistense ahead of the 2021 Campeonato Catarinense Série C. He played in five matches during the competition, scoring in a 2–1 away loss against Imbituba on 31 October.

Talisson moved to Itapirense ahead of the 2022 season, being included in the under-20 squad for the year's Copa São Paulo de Futebol Júnior. After impressing during the tournament, he was subsequently loaned to Red Bull Bragantino, and signed a permanent contract with the latter club until 2025 on 25 November 2022.

Promoted to the first team for the 2023 campaign, Talisson made his professional debut on 18 January of that year, coming on as a second-half substitute for Alerrandro in a 1–1 Campeonato Paulista away draw against São Bernardo. He scored his first goal for Braga on 6 April, netting his team's third in a 4–1 away routing of Tacuary, for the year's Copa Sudamericana.

== Career statistics ==
As of 4 May 2026

Appearances and goals by club, season and competition
Club	Season	League			State league (Note: Includes Campeonato Paulista, Campeonato Catarinense)		National cup (Note: Includes Copa do Brasil, Cupa României)		Continental		Other		Total	
Club	Season	Division	Apps	Goals	Apps	Goals	Apps	Goals	Apps	Goals	Apps	Goals	Apps	Goals
Red Bull Bragantino	2023	Campeonato Brasileiro Série A	7	3	1	0	0	0	2 (Note: Appearances in Copa Sudamericana)	1	—		8	4
Red Bull Bragantino	2024	Campeonato Brasileiro Série A	4	0	8	0	0	0	7 (Note: Three appearances and one goal in Copa Libertadores, four appearances in Copa Sudamericana)	1	—		19	1
Red Bull Bragantino	Total		11	3	9	0	0	0	9	2	—		29	5
Ceará (loan)	2024	Campeonato Brasileiro Série B	10	0	—		—		—		—		10	0
Criciúma (loan)	2025	Campeonato Brasileiro Série B	3	0	8	1	1	0	—		—		12	1
Criciúma (loan)	2025	Campeonato Brasileiro Série B	12	0	—		—		—		—		12	0
Avaí (loan)	2026	Campeonato Brasileiro Série B	—		4	2	—		—		—		4	2
Rapid București	2025–26	Liga I	11	0	—		1	0	—		—		12	0
Rapid București	2026–27	Liga I	0	0	—		0	0	—		—		0	0
Rapid București	Total		11	0	—		1	0	—		—		12	0
Career total			47	3	21	3	2	0	9	2	—		79	8
