= Estádio Cícero de Souza Marques =

Football stadium in Sao Paulo, Brazil

Cícero de Souza Marques
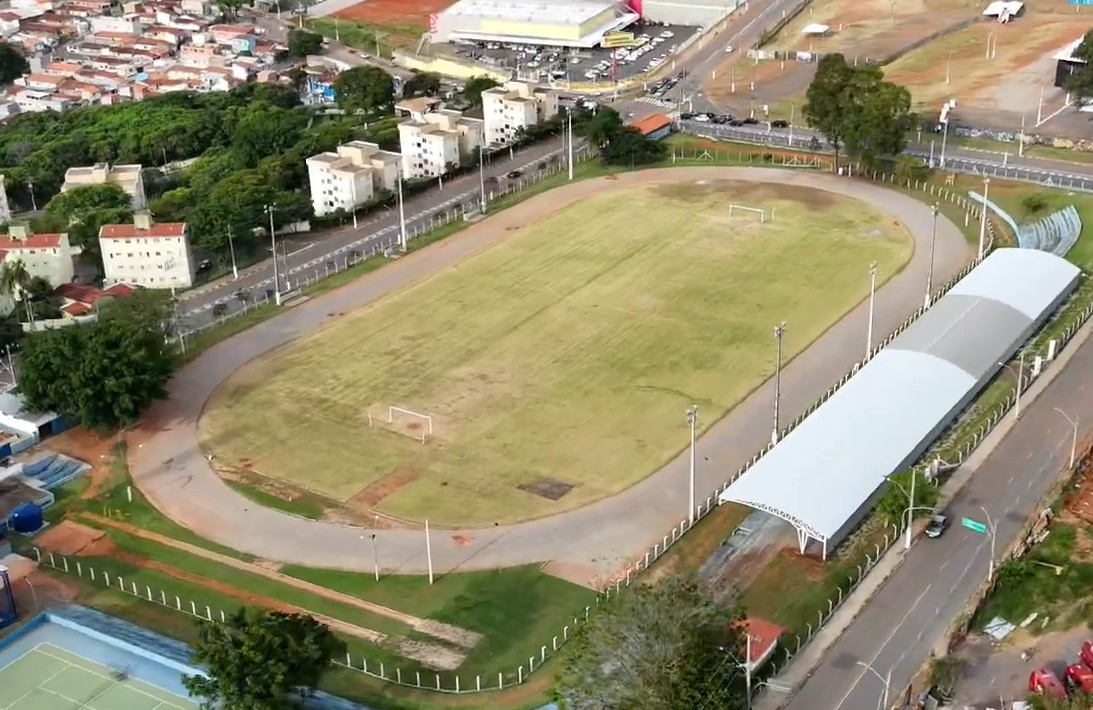
- Interactive map of Cícero de Souza Marques
- Full name: Estádio Municipal Cícero de Souza Marques
- Location: Bragança Paulista, São Paulo, Brazil
- Coordinates: 22.9509°S 46.5302°W
- Owner: Bragança Paulista Municipality
- Operator: Red Bull Bragantino
- Capacity: 12,000
- Surface: grass
- Field size: 105 x 68m

Construction
- Renovated: 2025

Tenant
- Red Bull Bragantino

Estádio Municipal Cícero de Souza Marques is an association football stadium in Bragança Paulista, São Paulo, Brazil.

== History ==
The field is owned by the Municipality of Bragança Paulista, and in concession with Red Bull group, a new stadium was built with the main purpose to host the Red Bull Bragantino matches while the Estádio Nabi Abi Chedid undergoes modifications. Total investments exceed the R$ 22 million mark. Construction work at Cícero de Souza Marques began in February 2024, and ended in April 2025.

Bragantino played their first match in the new stadium on 5 May 2025, a 1–0 win over Mirassol; Isidro Pitta scored the club's first goal in the stadium.
