= Jhon Jhon =

Brazilian footballer

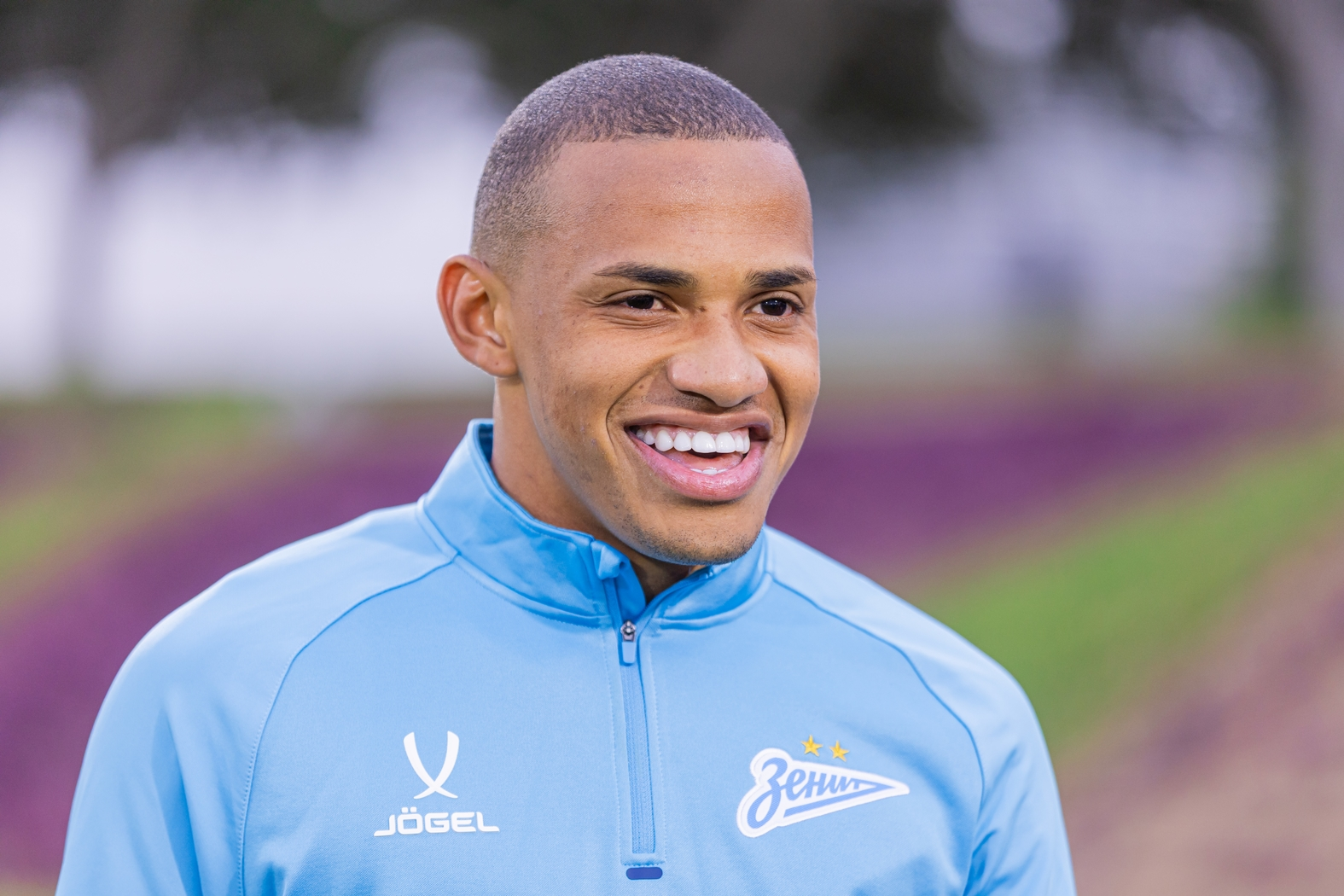
- Jhon Jhon training with Zenit St. Petersburg in 2026

Personal information
- Full name: Jhonatan dos Santos Rosa
- Date of birth: 9 September 2002 (age 24)
- Place of birth: Vitória, Brazil
- Height: 1.78 m (5 ft 10 in)
- Position: Midfielder

Team information
- Current team: Zenit St. Petersburg
- Number: 14

Youth career
- Primavera
- 2021: → Palmeiras (loan)
- 2022: Palmeiras

Senior career*
Years	Team	Apps	(Gls)
2021	Primavera	4	(1)
2021	→ Palmeiras (loan)	1	(0)
2022–2024	Palmeiras	33	(0)
2024–2026	Red Bull Bragantino	65	(18)
2026–	Zenit St. Petersburg	22	(4)
- * Club domestic league appearances and goals as of 21 November 2026

Jhonatan dos Santos Rosa (born 9 September 2002), known as Jhon Jhon or just Jhonatan, is a Brazilian footballer who plays as a midfielder for Russian Premier League club Zenit St. Petersburg.

== Club career ==
=== Early career ===
Born in Vitória, Espírito Santo, Jhon Jhon joined Primavera's youth setup after being spotted by former player Deco when playing for Portuguese club Boavista. He made his senior debut with the club during the 2021 Campeonato Paulista Série A3, scoring once in four matches.

=== Palmeiras ===
On 5 May 2021, Jhon Jhon was loaned to Palmeiras, being initially assigned to the under-20 squad. He made his first team – and Série A – debut on 10 December, coming on as a second-half substitute for goalscorer Kevin in a 1–0 home win over Ceará.

On 3 January 2022, Jhon Jhon signed a permanent deal with Verdão until 2026. After spending the year with the under-20s, he was promoted to the first team ahead of the 2023 campaign.

Regularly used during the 2023 season, Jhon Jhon was under criticism of the supporters during the 2024 campaign, which saw him having less playing time.

=== Red Bull Bragantino ===
On 15 July 2024, Red Bull Bragantino announced the signing of Jhon Jhon on a five-and-a-half-year contract. On his club debut nine days later, he scored the winner in a 3–2 Copa Sudamericana home win over Barcelona SC; it was also his first professional goal.

An undisputed starter in the 2025 season, Jhon Jhon scored 13 goals in all competitions, also providing 11 assists.

=== Zenit St. Petersburg ===
Jhon Jhon playing for Zenit St. Petersburg in 2026

On 28 January 2026, Jhon Jhon signed a five-and-a-half-year contract with Russian club Zenit St. Petersburg.

== Personal life ==
Jhon Jhon's father Marcelo Pelé was also a footballer. A forward, he notably represented Atlético Mineiro. Neymar is his second cousin once removed.

== Career statistics ==
As of 21 November 2026.

Club	Season	League			State League		Cup		Continental		Other		Total	
Club	Season	Division	Apps	Goals	Apps	Goals	Apps	Goals	Apps	Goals	Apps	Goals	Apps	Goals
Primavera	2021	Paulista A3	—		4	1	—		—		—		4	1
Palmeiras	2021	Série A	1	0	—		0	0	—		—		1	0
Palmeiras	2022	Série A	0	0	0	0	0	0	1 (Note: Appearance(s) in Copa Libertadores)	0	0	0	1	0
Palmeiras	2023	Série A	20	0	2	0	4	0	6	0	0	0	32	0
Palmeiras	2024	Série A	3	0	8	0	0	0	0	0	1	0	12	0
Palmeiras	Total		24	0	10	0	4	0	7	0	1	0	46	0
Red Bull Bragantino	2024	Série A	18	3	—		2	0	3 (Note: Appearance(s) in Copa Sudamericana)	1	—		23	4
Red Bull Bragantino	2025	Série A	34	10	11	2	6	1	—		—		51	13
Red Bull Bragantino	2026	Série A	—		2	3	—		—		—		2	3
Red Bull Bragantino	Total		52	13	13	5	8	1	3	1	0	0	76	20
Zenit St. Petersburg	2025–26	Russian Premier League	9	2	—		2	0	—		—		11	2
Zenit St. Petersburg	2026–27	Russian Premier League	13	2	—		4	0	—		1 (Note: Appearance in Russian Super Cup)	0	18	2
Zenit St. Petersburg	Total		22	4	0	0	6	0	0	0	1	0	29	4
Career total			98	17	27	6	18	1	10	1	2	0	155	25

== Honours ==
Palmeiras

- Campeonato Brasileiro Série A: 2022, 2023
- Supercopa do Brasil: 2023
- Campeonato Paulista: 2023, 2024

Zenit Saint Petersburg

- Russian Premier League: 2025–26
- Russian Super Cup: 2026
