= 2026 Associação Portuguesa de Desportos season =

Portuguesa
2026 season
- President: Leandro Teixeira Duarte
- Head coach: Fábio Matias (until 5 April); Ademir Fesan (from 6 April)
- Stadium: Canindé
- Série D: Round of 16
- Paulista: Quarter-final
- Copa do Brasil: Fourth round
- Top goalscorer: League: Cadorini (8 goals); All: Cadorini (10 goals)
Home colours	Away colours	Third colours

The 2026 season was Associação Portuguesa de Desportos' 106th season in existence. Lusa competed in the Série D for the second consecutive season, aside from the Campeonato Paulista.

== Players ==
=== Squad information ===
As of 27 July 2026

N	Name	Pos.	Nat.	Place of birth	Date of birth (age)	Caps	Goals	Signed from	Date signed	Fee	Contract end
Goalkeepers
1	Bruno Bertinato	GK	(Brazil)	Curitiba (Paraná (state))	31 May 1998 (age 28)	42	0	Venezia (Italy)	19 December 2024	Free	30 December 2026
12	João Paulo	GK	(Brazil)	Guarapuava (Paraná (state))	8 March 2001 (age 25)	1	0	Chapecoense	8 April 2025	Undisc.	15 September 2026
22	Eduardo	GK	(Brazil)	Cubatão (São Paulo (state))	18 June 2005 (age 21)	0	0	Youth system	16 March 2026	Free	15 September 2026
Defenders
2	João Vitor	RB	(Brazil)	Goiânia (Goiás)	25 July 2002 (age 24)	27	0	Monsoon	5 December 2025	Undisc.	30 November 2027
3	Gustavo Henrique	CB	(Brazil)	Fernando Prestes (São Paulo (state))	17 October 1999 (age 27)	41	0	CRB	12 December 2024	Undisc.	31 December 2028
4	Eduardo Biazus	CB/DM	(Brazil)	Curitiba (Paraná (state))	13 March 2001 (age 25)	44	1	Grêmio Prudente	7 January 2025	Undisc.	13 December 2028
6	Gustavo Salomão	LB	(Brazil)	Muzambinho (Minas Gerais)	28 June 1997 (age 29)	19	0	Retrô	19 November 2025	Free	30 March 2027
15	Wellington	CB	(Brazil)	São Paulo (São Paulo (state))	9 February 2005 (age 21)	2	0	Youth system	29 January 2026	Free	31 December 2026
16	Lucas Hipólito	LB/LW	(Brazil)	Belo Horizonte (Minas Gerais)	14 July 1995 (age 31)	25	1	Operário Ferroviário	19 December 2024	Free	14 September 2026
31	Gabriel	RB	(Brazil)	—N/a	24 May 2007 (age 19)	0	0	Youth system	5 June 2026	Free	31 January 2027
33	Eric Botteghin	CB	(Brazil)	São Paulo (São Paulo (state))	31 August 1987 (age 39)	18	1	Free agent	21 November 2025	Free	15 September 2026
39	Carlos Lima	CB	(Brazil)	Taboão da Serra (São Paulo (state))	6 April 2001 (age 25)	19	0	Tochigi City (Japan)	9 December 2025	Loan	30 September 2026
42	Gustavo Sciencia	RB	(Brazil)	São Bernardo do Campo (São Paulo (state))	1 January 2004 (age 22)	25	1	Youth system	14 June 2024	Free	30 November 2027
88	Rikelmi	CB	(Brazil)	—N/a	11 May 2006 (age 20)	0	0	Youth system	24 April 2026	Free	31 January 2027
Midfielders
5	Hudson	DM/RB	(Brazil)	São Paulo (São Paulo (state))	14 January 2001 (age 25)	65	0	Juventude	5 June 2021	Free	30 November 2027
7	Thiaguinho	DM/RB	(Brazil)	Suzano (São Paulo (state))	11 April 1997 (age 29)	14	0	Free agent	5 March 2026	Free	30 November 2026
8	Felipe Tontini	AM/CM	(Brazil)	Foz do Iguaçu (Paraná (state))	16 July 1995 (age 31)	3	0	São Luiz	12 March 2026	Free	15 September 2026
17	Romullo	DM	(Brazil)	São Paulo (São Paulo (state))	8 June 2007 (age 19)	2	0	Youth system	24 July 2025	Free	30 January 2027
20	Guilherme Portuga	CM/AM	(Brazil)	Taboão da Serra (São Paulo (state))	16 July 1998 (age 28)	53	6	Galo Maringá	8 May 2024	Free	30 November 2027
25	Mateus Cecchini	DM	(Brazil)	Porto Alegre (Rio Grande do Sul)	25 February 2003 (age 23)	17	1	SV Stripfing (Austria)	26 December 2025	Free	15 September 2026
27	Denis	CM/AM	(Brazil)	São Bernardo do Campo (São Paulo (state))	8 January 2004 (age 22)	34	1	Youth system	30 June 2023	Free	15 September 2026
40	Fellype Gabryel	AM	(Brazil)	Florianópolis (Santa Catarina (state))	19 September 2006 (age 20)	1	0	Youth system	29 May 2026	Free	31 January 2027
—	Foguete	AM	(Brazil)	Magé (Rio de Janeiro (state))	3 March 2006 (age 20)	0	0	Botafogo^{(YS)}	9 May 2026	Loan	31 January 2027
—	Franco	CM/RB	(Brazil)	Uberlândia (Minas Gerais)	27 January 1993 (age 33)	3	0	São José-SP	2 August 2024	Free	30 August 2026
Forwards
9	Matheus Cadorini	ST	(Brazil)	Taubaté (São Paulo (state))	1 September 2002 (age 24)	21	9	Murcia (Spain)	11 December 2025	Undisc.	10 December 2028
10	Jonas Toró	LW/RW	(Brazil)	Belém de São Francisco (Pernambuco)	30 May 1999 (age 27)	8	1	Náutico	26 March 2026	Free	15 March 2027
11	Cauari	LW/RW	(Brazil)	Santos (São Paulo (state))	23 September 2002 (age 24)	31	5	Galo Maringá	10 April 2025	Undisc.	31 December 2027
13	Igor Torres	ST/LW	(Brazil)	São Paulo (São Paulo (state))	11 March 2000 (age 26)	40	8	Fortaleza	6 February 2025	Free	10 December 2027
21	Thiago Rubim	LW/ST	(Brazil)	Franca (São Paulo (state))	4 March 1999 (age 27)	3	0	Pouso Alegre	18 June 2026	Loan	30 November 2026
30	Guilherme Santos	RW/AM	(Brazil)	Serra (Espírito Santo)	13 May 2001 (age 25)	12	0	Botafogo-PB	20 March 2026	Free	30 November 2027
41	Huck	RW	(Brazil)	—N/a	15 June 2007 (age 19)	1	0	Youth system	5 June 2026	Free	31 January 2027
71	Luca	RW	(Brazil)	São Paulo (São Paulo (state))	8 February 2007 (age 19)	0	0	Youth system	1 May 2026	Free	30 January 2027
99	João Diogo	RW/AM	(Brazil)	Santarém (Pará)	13 January 1999 (age 27)	13	1	ABC	1 April 2026	Free	15 March 2027

Source: FPF (for contracts). Players in italic are not registered for the Campeonato Brasileiro Série D.

Campeonato Paulista squad
- Teams are able to register up to 35 players in the A List, while an unlimited number of players above the age of 16 and born until 2005, with at least six months in the club, can be registered in the B List.
- Players in ~~strike~~ were replaced, players in italic left the club.
- A List
- Note: Flags indicate national team as defined under FIFA eligibility rules; some limited exceptions apply. Players may hold more than one non-FIFA nationality.
  No.	Pos.	Nation	Player
  —	GK	BRA	Bruno Bertinato
  —	GK	BRA	Eduardo
  —	GK	BRA	João Paulo
  —	DF	BRA	Carlos Lima
  —	DF	BRA	Eduardo Biazus
  —	DF	BRA	Eric Botteghin
  —	DF	BRA	Gustavo Henrique
  —	DF	BRA	Caio Roque
  —	DF	BRA	Ewerthon
  —	DF	BRA	Gustavo Salomão
  —	DF	BRA	Sciencia
  —	DF	BRA	João Vitor
  —	DF	BRA	Lucas Hipólito
  —	MF	BRA	Denis
  No.	Pos.	Nation	Player
  —	MF	BRA	Gabriel Pires
  —	MF	BRA	Hudson
  —	MF	BRA	Mateus Cecchini
  —	MF	BRA	Guilherme Portuga
  —	MF	BRA	Marcelo Freitas
  —	MF	BRA	Zé Vitor
  —	FW	BRA	Cauari
  —	FW	BRA	Everton Maceió
  —	FW	BRA	Igor Torres
  —	FW	BRA	Kauê Dias
  —	FW	BRA	Keven Coloni
  —	FW	BRA	Lohan
  —	FW	BRA	Matheus Cadorini
  —	FW	BRA	Renê
- B List
- Note: Flags indicate national team as defined under FIFA eligibility rules; some limited exceptions apply. Players may hold more than one non-FIFA nationality.
  No.	Pos.	Nation	Player
  —	GK	BRA	Paulinho
  —	DF	BRA	Ernest Muñoz
  —	DF	BRA	Wellington
  —	DF	BRA	Jotta
  No.	Pos.	Nation	Player
  —	MF	BRA	Romullo
  —	FW	BRA	Kauã Freire
  —	FW	BRA	Rian Lucas
  Notes

=== Appearances and goals ===
No.	Pos.	Nat	Name	Brasileirão Série D		Paulistão		Copa do Brasil		Total	
No.	Pos.	Nat	Name	Apps	Goals	Apps	Goals	Apps	Goals	Apps	Goals
1	GK	(Brazil)	Bruno Bertinato	15	0	9	0	3	0	27	0
12	GK	(Brazil)	João Paulo	1	0	0	0	0	0	1	0
22	GK	(Brazil)	Eduardo	0	0	0	0	0	0	0	0
2	DF	(Brazil)	João Vitor	15	0	9	0	3	0	27	0
3	DF	(Brazil)	Gustavo Henrique	3+2	0	8	0	3	0	16	0
4	DF	(Brazil)	Eduardo Biazus	10	1	8	0	3	0	21	1
6	DF	(Brazil)	Gustavo Salomão	13	0	2+1	0	1+2	0	19	0
7	DF	(Brazil)	Ewerthon	0	0	7+2	1	1	0	10	1
15	DF	(Brazil)	Wellington	0+2	0	0	0	0	0	2	0
16	DF	(Brazil)	Lucas Hipólito	6+8	1	0	0	0	0	14	1
17	DF	(Brazil)	Caio Roque	0	0	7	0	2	0	9	0
26	DF	(Brazil)	Jotta	0	0	0	0	0	0	0	0
31	DF	(Brazil)	Gabriel	0	0	0	0	0	0	0	0
33	DF	(Brazil)	Eric Botteghin	13	1	0+4	0	0+1	0	18	1
39	DF	(Brazil)	Carlos Lima	9+4	0	2+3	0	0+1	0	19	0
42	DF	(Brazil)	Sciencia	1+7	1	0+4	0	0+1	0	13	1
88	DF	(Brazil)	Rikelmi	0	0	0	0	0	0	0	0
5	MF	(Brazil)	Hudson	2+5	0	2+5	0	1+2	0	17	0
7	MF	(Brazil)	Thiaguinho	13	0	0	0	1	0	14	0
8	MF	(Brazil)	Felipe Tontini	0+2	0	0	0	1	0	3	0
8	MF	(Brazil)	Zé Vitor	0	0	9	1	2	0	11	1
10	MF	(Brazil)	Gabriel Pires	0	0	9	1	0	0	9	1
14	MF	(Brazil)	Marcelo Freitas	0	0	0+1	0	0	0	1	0
17	MF	(Brazil)	Romullo	0+1	0	0	0	0	0	1	0
20	MF	(Brazil)	Guilherme Portuga	15	1	6+2	0	3	0	26	1
25	MF	(Brazil)	Mateus Cecchini	4+7	1	1+4	0	0+1	0	17	1
27	MF	(Brazil)	Denis	5+6	0	0+4	0	2+1	0	18	0
31	MF	(Brazil)	Foguete	0	0	0	0	0	0	0	0
40	MF	(Brazil)	Fellype Gabryel	0+1	0	0	0	0	0	1	0
9	FW	(Brazil)	Matheus Cadorini	13+1	8	1+4	2	1+1	0	21	10
10	FW	(Brazil)	Jonas Toró	3+5	1	0	0	0	0	8	1
11	FW	(Brazil)	Cauari	1+11	2	0+4	1	0+2	0	18	3
13	FW	(Brazil)	Igor Torres	14	4	1+4	0	2+1	3	22	7
19	FW	(Brazil)	Maceió	9	1	9	3	3	1	21	5
21	FW	(Brazil)	Thiago Rubim	0+3	0	0	0	0	0	3	0
21	FW	(Brazil)	Renê	0	0	8	3	2+1	4	11	7
30	FW	(Brazil)	Guilherme Santos	5+7	0	0	0	0	0	12	0
30	FW	(Brazil)	Kauê Dias	0	0	0	0	0	0	0	0
41	FW	(Brazil)	Huck	0+1	0	0	0	0	0	1	0
71	FW	(Brazil)	Luca	0	0	0	0	0	0	0	0
77	FW	(Brazil)	Keven Coloni	0	0	0+2	0	0	0	2	0
91	FW	(Brazil)	Lohan	0	0	1+1	0	0	0	2	0
99	FW	(Brazil)	João Diogo	6+7	1	0	0	0	0	13	1

Source: Match reports in Competitive matches, Soccerway

=== Goalscorers ===
Ran	No.	Pos	Nat	Name	Série D	Paulistão	Copa do Brasil	Total
1	9	FW	(Brazil)	Matheus Cadorini	8	2	0	10
2	13	FW	(Brazil)	Igor Torres	4	0	3	7
2	21	FW	(Brazil)	Renê	0	3	4	7
3	19	FW	(Brazil)	Maceió	1	3	1	5
4	11	FW	(Brazil)	Cauari	2	1	0	3
5	4	DF	(Brazil)	Eduardo Biazus	1	0	0	1
5	7	DF	(Brazil)	Ewerthon	0	1	0	1
5	8	MF	(Brazil)	Zé Vitor	0	1	0	1
5	10	MF	(Brazil)	Gabriel Pires	0	1	0	1
5	10	FW	(Brazil)	Jonas Toró	1	0	0	1
5	20	MF	(Brazil)	Guilherme Portuga	1	0	0	1
5	25	MF	(Brazil)	Mateus Cecchini	1	0	0	1
5	33	DF	(Brazil)	Eric Botteghin	1	0	0	1
5	42	DF	(Brazil)	Sciencia	1	0	0	1
5	99	FW	(Brazil)	João Diogo	1	0	0	1
Total					22	12	9	43

Source: Match reports in Competitive matches

=== Disciplinary record ===
N	Nat	Pos	Name	Série D			Paulistão			Copa do Brasil			Total		
N	Nat	Pos	Name	Yellow card	(yellow card) (yellow-red card)	Red card	Yellow card	(yellow card) (yellow-red card)	Red card	Yellow card	(yellow card) (yellow-red card)	Red card	Yellow card	(yellow card) (yellow-red card)	Red card
2	(Brazil)	DF	João Vitor	5	0	0	3	0	0	0	0	0	8	0	0
4	(Brazil)	DF	Eduardo Biazus	2	0	0	3	0	0	1	0	1	6	0	1
20	(Brazil)	MF	Guilherme Portuga	5	0	0	2	0	0	0	0	0	7	0	0
13	(Brazil)	FW	Igor Torres	3	0	0	1	0	1	0	0	0	4	0	1
1	(Brazil)	GK	Bruno Bertinato	2	0	0	3	0	0	0	0	0	5	0	0
9	(Brazil)	FW	Matheus Cadorini	3	0	1	0	0	0	0	0	0	3	0	1
5	(Brazil)	MF	Hudson	1	0	0	3	0	0	0	0	0	4	0	0
99	(Brazil)	FW	João Diogo	4	0	0	0	0	0	0	0	0	4	0	0
6	(Brazil)	DF	Gustavo Salomão	1	0	0	2	0	0	0	0	0	3	0	0
11	(Brazil)	FW	Cauari	1	0	0	2	0	0	0	0	0	3	0	0
19	(Brazil)	FW	Everton Maceió	2	0	0	1	0	0	0	0	0	3	0	0
3	(Brazil)	DF	Gustavo Henrique	0	0	0	1	0	1	0	0	0	1	0	1
8	(Brazil)	MF	Felipe Tontini	2	0	0	0	0	0	0	0	0	2	0	0
8	(Brazil)	MF	Zé Vitor	0	0	0	1	0	0	1	0	0	2	0	0
16	(Brazil)	DF	Lucas Hipólito	2	0	0	0	0	0	0	0	0	2	0	0
25	(Brazil)	MF	Mateus Cecchini	1	0	0	1	0	0	0	0	0	2	0	0
30	(Brazil)	FW	Guilherme Santos	2	0	0	0	0	0	0	0	0	2	0	0
42	(Brazil)	DF	Sciencia	1	0	0	1	0	0	0	0	0	2	0	0
21	(Brazil)	FW	Renê	0	0	0	0	0	1	0	0	0	0	0	1
7	(Brazil)	DF	Ewerthon	0	0	0	1	0	0	0	0	0	1	0	0
7	(Brazil)	MF	Thiaguinho	1	0	0	0	0	0	0	0	0	1	0	0
10	(Brazil)	MF	Gabriel Pires	0	0	0	1	0	0	0	0	0	1	0	0
10	(Brazil)	FW	Jonas Toró	1	0	0	0	0	0	0	0	0	1	0	0
12	(Brazil)	GK	João Paulo	0	0	0	1	0	0	0	0	0	1	0	0
17	(Brazil)	DF	Caio Roque	0	0	0	1	0	0	0	0	0	1	0	0
21	(Brazil)	FW	Thiago Rubim	1	0	0	0	0	0	0	0	0	1	0	0
27	(Brazil)	MF	Denis	0	0	0	1	0	0	0	0	0	1	0	0
33	(Brazil)	DF	Eric Botteghin	1	0	0	0	0	0	0	0	0	1	0	0
39	(Brazil)	DF	Carlos Lima	1	0	0	0	0	0	0	0	0	1	0	0
77	(Brazil)	FW	Keven Coloni	1	0	0	0	0	0	0	0	0	1	0	0
Total				43	0	1	28	0	3	4	0	1	75	0	5

(yellow card) = Number of bookings; (yellow card) (yellow-red card) = Number of sending offs after a second yellow card; (red card) = Number of sending offs by a direct red card.

Source: Match reports in Competitive matches

== Coaches ==
Name	Nat.	Place of birth	Date of birth (age)	Signed from	Date signed	Role	G	W	D	L	%	Departure	Manner	Contract end
Fábio Matias	(Brazil)	Santa Bárbara d'Oeste (São Paulo (state))	25 September 1979 (age 47)	Free agent	30 September 2025	Permanent	13	6	3	4	46.15	5 April 2026	Sacked	31 December 2026
Ademir Fesan	(Brazil)	São Paulo (São Paulo (state))	1 June 1977 (age 49)	Free agent	6 April 2026	Permanent	15	9	4	2	60.00			31 December 2026

== Transfers ==
=== Transfers in ===
Pos.	Name	Age	Moving from	Type	Fee	Source
CM	(Brazil) Gabriel Pires	32	Free agent	Transfer	Free	
CB	(Brazil) Gustavo Henrique	26	(Brazil) Caxias	Loan return	Free	
DM	(Brazil) Tauã	30	(Brazil) Caxias	Loan return	Free	
ST	(Brazil) Igor Torres	25	(Brazil) Caxias	Loan return	Free	
CB	(Brazil) Marco	25	(Brazil) São Bento	Loan return	Free	
ST	(Brazil) Hericlis	30	(Brazil) América-PE	Loan return	Free	
CB	(Brazil) Eduardo Biazus	24	(Brazil) CSA	Loan return	Free	
DM	(Brazil) Hudson	24	(Brazil) Juventude	Loan return	Free	
LB	(Brazil) Gustavo Salomão	28	(Brazil) Retrô	Transfer	Free	
CB	(Brazil) Eric Botteghin	38	Free agent	Transfer	Free	
GK	(Brazil) Bruno Bertinato	27	(Brazil) Mirassol	Loan return	Free	
LW	(Brazil) Renê	22	(Brazil) São José-RS	Transfer	Free	
RW	(Brazil) Everton Maceió	22	(Brazil) Mirassol	Loan return	Free	
RB	(Brazil) João Vitor	23	(Brazil) Monsoon	Transfer	Undisclosed	
ST	(Brazil) Matheus Cadorini	23	(Spain) Murcia	Transfer	Undisclosed	
DM	(Brazil) Mateus Cecchini	22	(Austria) SV Stripfing	Transfer	Free	
LB	(Brazil) Caio Roque	23	(Brazil) Bahia	Transfer	Free	
RB	(Brazil) Ewerthon	25	(Brazil) Sport	Transfer	Free	
DM	(Brazil) Thiaguinho	28	Free agent	Transfer	Free	
AM	(Brazil) Felipe Tontini	30	(Brazil) São Luiz	Transfer	Free	
RW	(Brazil) Guilherme Santos	24	(Brazil) Botafogo-PB	Transfer	Free	
LW	(Brazil) Jonas Toró	26	(Brazil) Náutico	Transfer	Free	
RW	(Brazil) João Diogo	27	(Brazil) ABC	Transfer	Free	

=== Loans in ===
Pos.	Name	Age	Loaned from	Loan expires	Fee	Source
CM	(Brazil) Zé Vitor	25	(Brazil) Maringá	March 2026	Free	
CB	(Brazil) Carlos Lima	24	(Japan) Tochigi City	September 2026	Free	
LW	(Brazil) Thiago Rubim	27	(Brazil) Atlético Tubarão	November 2026	Free	

=== Transfers out ===
Pos.	Name	Age	Moving to	Type	Fee	Source
DM	(Brazil) Tauã	30	(Brazil) Noroeste	Contract rescinded	Free	
LB	(Brazil) Pedro Henrique	21	(Brazil) Betim	Contract ended	Free	
RW	(Brazil) Leandro	22	(Brazil) Atlético de Cajazeiras	Contract ended	Free	
GK	(Brazil) Estevão	21	(Brazil) Penapolense	Contract ended	Free	
AM	(Brazil) Cristiano	38	(Brazil) Ponte Preta	Contract rescinded	Free	
GK	(Brazil) Rafael Pascoal	35	(Brazil) Confiança	Contract ended	Free	
CB	(Brazil) Robson	32	(Brazil) Inter de Limeira	Contract ended	Free	
ST	(Brazil) Lohan	30	(Brazil) Portuguesa-RJ	Contract rescinded	Free	
AM	(Brazil) Gabriel Pires	32	(Brazil) Mirassol	Transfer	Undisclosed	
LW	(Brazil) Kauê Dias	21	(Brazil) Portuguesa-RJ	Contract ended	Free	
RB	(Brazil) Ewerthon	25	(Brazil) Atlético Goianiense	Contract ended	Free	
CM	(Brazil) Zé Vitor	25	(Brazil) Maringá	Loan ended	Free	
RB	(Brazil) Jotta	21	(Brazil) EC São Bernardo	Contract rescinded	Free	
ST	(Brazil) Keven Coloni	21	(Brazil) Boavista	Transfer	Free	

=== Loans out ===
Pos.	Name	Age	Loaned to	Loan expires	Source
LW	(Brazil) Everton Messias	23	(Brazil) Madureira	March 2026	
ST	(Brazil) Hericlis	30	(Brazil) Madureira	March 2026	
CB	(Brazil) Marco	25	(Brazil) Sertãozinho	February 2026	
RB	(Brazil) Carlos Eduardo	29	(Brazil) Santo André	April 2026	
RW	(Brazil) De Paula	26	(Brazil) Pouso Alegre	March 2026	
AM	(Brazil) Marcelo Freitas	31	(Brazil) Caxias	November 2026	
LB	(Brazil) Caio Roque	24	(Brazil) Botafogo	December 2026	
ST	(Brazil) Renê	22	(Brazil) Vitória	December 2026	
LW	(Brazil) Everton Maceió	22	(Japan) Kyoto Sanga	June 2027	

== Pre-season and friendlies ==
Win Draw Loss Fixtures

29 November 2025 Friendly	Portuguesa	3–1	Itapirense	São Paulo
		Report		Stadium: CT da Portuguesa

6 December 2025 Friendly	Portuguesa	0–0	Água Santa	São Paulo
		Report		Stadium: CT da Portuguesa

13 December 2025 Friendly	Portuguesa	2–2	Betim	São Paulo
	Guilherme Portuga; Lohan	Report	Luiz Felipe; Cauã Marangoni	Stadium: CT da Portuguesa

18 December 2025 Friendly	Portuguesa	5–0	Portuguesa U20	São Paulo
	Renê, Lohan, Keven Coloni	Report		Stadium: CT da Portuguesa

22 December 2025 Friendly	Portuguesa	4–0	Nacional-SP	São Paulo
	Denis; Lohan; João Vitor; Cadorini	Report		Stadium: CT da Portuguesa

23 December 2025 Friendly	Portuguesa	2–1	São José-SP	São Paulo
	Renê,	Report	Clessione	Stadium: CT da Portuguesa

13 June 2026 Friendly	Portuguesa	2–1	Paulista	São Paulo
	Igor Torres; Cadorini	Report	Goal	Stadium: CT da Portuguesa

== Competitions ==
=== Campeonato Paulista ===
==== Results summary ====
Overall								Home						Away					
Pld	W	D	L	GF	GA	GD	Pts	W	D	L	GF	GA	GD	W	D	L	GF	GA	GD
8	5	0	3	11	7	+4	15	2	0	2	4	2	+2	3	0	1	7	5	+2

==== First stage ====
Pos	Team	Pld	W	D	L	GF	GA	GD	Pts	Qualification
2	Palmeiras	8	5	1	2	8	7	+1	16	Qualification for the Quarter-finals
3	Red Bull Bragantino	8	4	4	0	14	2	+12	16	Qualification for the Quarter-finals
4	Portuguesa	8	5	0	3	11	7	+4	15	Qualification for the Quarter-finals
5	Corinthians	8	4	2	2	10	6	+4	14	Qualification for the Quarter-finals
6	São Paulo	8	4	1	3	11	12	−1	13	Qualification for the Quarter-finals

Source: FPF
Rules for classification: 1) points; 2) wins; 3) goal difference; 4) goals scored; 5) head-to-head results (only between 2 teams); 6) fewest red cards; 7) fewest yellow cards; 8) draw.

===== Matches =====
10 January 1	Portuguesa	0–1	Palmeiras	São Paulo
20:30	Salomão (yellow card) 4'; Igor Torres (red card) 50'; Eduardo Biazus (yellow card) 72'; Hudson (yellow card) 76'; Guilherme Portuga (yellow card) 90+3'	Report	(yellow card) 38' Murilo; 53' Luighi; (yellow card) 90+2' Benedetti	Stadium: Canindé; Attendance: 9,624; Referee: Lucas Canetto Bellote

13 January 2	Capivariano	1–0	Portuguesa	Capivari
21:30	Leonan (yellow card) 45'; Baianinho 90+3'	Report	(yellow card) 45+2' Hudson; (yellow card) 59' Salomão; (yellow card) 77' Gustavo Henrique	Stadium: Arena Capivari; Attendance: 1,847; Referee: Gustavo Holanda Souza

17 January 3	Portuguesa	2–0	Velo Clube	São Paulo
17:00	Renê 18' (pen.); Guilherme Portuga (yellow card) 30'; Zé Vitor (yellow card) 42'; Igor Torres (yellow card) 71'; Sciencia (yellow card) 82'; Maceió 90+5'	Report	(yellow card) 40' Ynaiã	Stadium: Canindé; Attendance: 2,567; Referee: Flavio Rodrigues de Souza

21 January 4	São Paulo	2–3	Portuguesa	São Paulo
19:30	Lucas (yellow card) 2'; Calleri 75', 90+2'	Report	(yellow card) 46' Gabriel Pires; 49', 83' (pen.), (red card) 90+5' Renê; (yellow card) 63' Eduardo Biazus; 88' Maceió; (yellow card) 90+2' Hudson	Stadium: Morumbi; Attendance: 25,544; Referee: Raphael Claus

26 January 5	Portuguesa	0–1	Guarani	São Paulo
20:00	Gustavo Henrique (red card) 30'	Report	53' Jonathan Costa	Stadium: Canindé; Attendance: 5,528; Referee: João Vitor Gobi

31 January 6	Primavera	1–2	Portuguesa	Indaiatuba
20:30	Welliton 41'; Júnior Caiçara (yellow card) 47'; Samuel Andrade (yellow card) 90+5'	Report	(yellow card) 62' Denis; 76' Cadorini; 80', (yellow card) 80' Cauari; (yellow card) 88' Bertinato	Stadium: Ítalo Mário Limongi; Attendance: 7,426; Referee: Matheus Delgado Candançan

7 February 7	Portuguesa	2–0	Ponte Preta	São Paulo
16:00	Gabriel Pires 42'; João Vitor (yellow card) 45+2'; Cadorini 53'; Ewerthon (yellow card) 61'	Report	(yellow card) 22' Lucas Cunha; (yellow card) 31' Kevyson; (red card) 90+2' Tárik	Stadium: Canindé; Attendance: 6,705; Referee: Douglas Marques das Flores

15 February 8	Mirassol	1–2	Portuguesa	Mirassol
20:30	Negueba 6'; José Aldo (yellow card) 45+1'; João Victor (yellow card) 90'	Report	(yellow card) 19' João Vitor; 22' Maceió; (yellow card) 57' Bertinato; 65' Ewerthon; (yellow card) 68' Cauari; (yellow card) 74' Cecchini	Stadium: José Maria de Campos Maia; Attendance: 3,541; Referee: Marianna Nanni Batalha

==== Quarter-final ====
22 February	Portuguesa	1–1 (7–8 p)	Corinthians	São Paulo
20:30	Renê (penalty missed) 26'; Zé Vitor 37'; Caio Roque (yellow card) 41'; Eduardo Biazus (yellow card) 45+1'; João Vitor (yellow card) 79'; Bertinato (yellow card) 90+2'	Report	(yellow card) 53' Bidon; (yellow card) 85' Gustavo Henrique; 90+4' Vitinho	Stadium: Canindé; Attendance: 12,784; Referee: Raphael Claus
	Penalties
	Zé Vitor (penalty scored); Renê (penalty missed); Botteghin (penalty scored); Gustavo Henrique (penalty scored); Maceió (penalty scored); Hudson (penalty scored); Salomão (penalty scored); Carlos Lima (penalty scored); Cauari (penalty missed)		(penalty missed) Garro; (penalty scored) Vitinho; (penalty scored) Matheuzinho; (penalty scored) Gustavo Henrique; (penalty scored) Pedro Raul; (penalty scored) André Ramalho; (penalty scored) Kayke; (penalty scored) André; (penalty scored) Allan

=== Copa do Brasil ===
==== Second stage ====
26 February G57	Portuguesa	5–1	Altos	São Paulo
21:30	Igor Torres 64', 82'; Renê 68', 90+2'; Maceió 71'	Report	58' Betinho; (yellow card) 86' Hebert	Stadium: Canindé; Attendance: 1,447; Referee: Roger Goulart

==== Third stage ====
11 March G81	Portuguesa	1–1 (4–1 p)	Avaí	São Paulo
19:00	Renê 20'; Maceió (yellow card) 18'; João Paulo (yellow card) 26'; Eduardo Biazus (yellow card) 78'; Zé Vitor (yellow card) 81'	Report	(yellow card) 2' Luiz Henrique; 15' Paulo Vitor; (yellow card) 18' Daniel Penha; (yellow card) 87' DG	Stadium: Canindé; Attendance: 1,804; Referee: Bruno Pereira Vasconcelos
	Penalties
	Zé Vitor (penalty scored); Cadorini (penalty scored); Salomão (penalty scored); Maceió (penalty scored)		(penalty scored) Rafael Bilú; (penalty missed) Sorriso; (penalty missed) Cristiano

==== Fourth stage ====
17 March G94	Portuguesa	2–3	Paysandu	São Paulo
21:30	Igor Torres 22'; Renê 37'; Eduardo Biazus (red card) 67'	Report	(yellow card) 52', (goal) 56' Pedro Henrique; (yellow card) 83' Iarley; 90+2' Ítalo; 90+6' Castro	Stadium: Canindé; Attendance: 4,111; Referee: Jefferson Ferreira de Moraes

=== Campeonato Brasileiro Série D ===
==== Results summary ====
Overall								Home						Away					
Pld	W	D	L	GF	GA	GD	Pts	W	D	L	GF	GA	GD	W	D	L	GF	GA	GD
16	9	5	2	22	10	+12	32	7	1	0	15	2	+13	2	4	2	7	8	−1

==== Group stage ====
Pos	Team	Pld	W	D	L	GF	GA	GD	Pts	Qualification
1	(São Paulo (state)) Portuguesa	10	6	3	1	16	6	+10	21	Advance to round of 64
2	(São Paulo (state)) Água Santa	10	5	2	3	16	8	+8	17	Advance to round of 64
3	(Rio de Janeiro (state)) Portuguesa	10	3	5	2	14	9	+5	14	Advance to round of 64
4	(Rio de Janeiro (state)) America	10	3	3	4	11	21	−10	12	Advance to round of 64
5	(Rio de Janeiro (state)) Madureira	10	3	2	5	11	16	−5	11	

Source: CBF
Rules for classification: 1) points; 2) wins; 3) goal difference; 4) goals scored; 5) head-to-head results (only between 2 teams); 6) fewest red cards; 7) fewest yellow cards; 8) draw.

===== Matches =====
4 April 1	Portuguesa-RJ	1–1	Portuguesa	Rio de Janeiro
19:00	Lohan 1', (yellow card) 32'; Guilherme Santos (yellow card) 60'; Wellington (yellow card) 90+1'	Report	30', (yellow card) 51' Cadorini; (yellow card) 40' Thiaguinho; (yellow card) 43' Igor Torres; (yellow card) 60' Guilherme Portuga	Stadium: Estádio Luso Brasileiro; Attendance: 1,376; Referee: Jailton Moura Silva Filho

11 April 2	Portuguesa	3–0	Pouso Alegre	São Paulo
19:00	Igor Torres 15'; Guilherme Portuga (yellow card) 36', (goal) 67'; Bertinato (yellow card) 77'; Cauari 77'; João Diogo (yellow card) 90+2'; João Vitor (yellow card) 90+2'	Report	(yellow card) 28' Thiago Rubim; (yellow card) 40' Xandão; (yellow card) 90+2' Gabriel Rossetto	Stadium: Canindé; Attendance: 2,777; Referee: Tarcisio Nascimento Matos

18 April 3	America-RJ	1–1	Portuguesa	Mesquita
15:00	Kadu (yellow card) 64'; Emerson Carioca 89'	Report	(yellow card) 4' Salomão; 39' Cadorini; (yellow card) 53' Guilherme Santos	Stadium: Giulite Coutinho; Attendance: 603; Referee: Bruno Nogueira Prado

25 April 4	Água Santa	0–1	Portuguesa	Diadema
16:00	Villian (yellow card) 43'; Willian Bahia (yellow card) 71'; Douglas (yellow card) 90+4'	Report	33', (yellow card) 57' Cecchini; (yellow card) 50' João Vitor; (yellow card) 56' Keven Coloni; (yellow card) 79' Igor Torres; (yellow card) 90+4' Cadorini	Stadium: Arena Inamar; Attendance: 2,551; Referee: Murilo Ugolini Klein

2 May 5	Portuguesa	2–1	Madureira	São Paulo
19:00	Eduardo Biazus 3'; Maceió 40', (yellow card) 45+1'; João Diogo (yellow card) 59'	Report	(yellow card) 27' Adriano; 51' João Carlos; (yellow card) 52' Rodrigo Andrade; (yellow card) 65' Wendel Lessa; (yellow card) 90+1' Júnior Santos	Stadium: Canindé; Attendance: 2,727; Referee: Fabio Augusto Santos Sá Júnior

9 May 6	Madureira	1–0	Portuguesa	Rio de Janeiro
16:00	Cauã Coutinho 83'	Report	(yellow card) 90+5' Toró	Stadium: Conselheiro Galvão; Attendance: 483; Referee: Ivan da Silva Guimaraes Junior

16 May 7	Portuguesa	0–0	Água Santa	São Paulo
16:00		Report	(yellow card) 12' Marzagão; (yellow card) 40' Jonatha Carlos; (yellow card) 58' Levi; (yellow card) 64' Michel Bennech; (yellow card) 84' Alisson	Stadium: Canindé; Attendance: 2,701; Referee: Charly Wendy Straub Deretti

23 May 8	Portuguesa	4–1	America-RJ	São Paulo
16:00	Cadorini 2', 18'; Guilherme Portuga (yellow card) 60'; Igor Torres 63'; Carlos Lima (yellow card) 68'; João Diogo 72'; Hudson (yellow card) 88'		21' Júlio César; (yellow card) 44' Ryan Couto; (yellow card) 90+1' Nascimento	Stadium: Canindé; Attendance: 1,721; Referee: Marcio dos Santos Oliveira

30 May 9	Pouso Alegre	1–2	Portuguesa	Pouso Alegre
16:00	Dudu 20'; Michael Paulista (yellow card) 23'; Takahashi (yellow card) 57'	Report	(yellow card) 23' Maceió; (yellow card) 43' Tontini; 62' Cadorini; 66' Botteghin; (yellow card) 72' João Vitor	Stadium: Manduzão; Attendance: 1,216; Referee: Wiomar Santana de Oliveira

6 June 10	Portuguesa	2–0	Portuguesa-RJ	São Paulo
15:00	Cauari (yellow card) 54', (goal) 59'; Tontini (yellow card) 81'; Lucas Hipólito (yellow card) 89'; Sciencia 90+4'	Report	(yellow card) 7' Henrique Rocha; (yellow card) 42' Rhuan; (yellow card) 52' Bruno; (yellow card) 84' Lucas Oliveira; (yellow card) 90+1', (red card) Guilherme Santos; (yellow card) 90+2' Wellington Cézar	Stadium: Canindé; Attendance: 2,660; Referee: Jackson Ribeiro de Souza Sobrinho

==== Round of 64 ====
20 June First leg	Sampaio Corrêa-RJ	1–1	Portuguesa	Saquarema
17:00	Ryan Padilha 32'; Luan Gama (yellow card) 90+2'	Report	(yellow card) 77' Thiago Rubim; 89' Cadorini; (yellow card) 90+1' Guilherme Santos; (yellow card) 90+3' João Diogo	Stadium: Lourival Gomes; Attendance: 252; Referee: Emerson Souza Silva

27 June Second leg	Portuguesa	1–0 (2–1 agg.)	Sampaio Corrêa-RJ	São Paulo
16:00	Cadorini (yellow card) 66', (goal) 90+1'; Sciencia (yellow card) 82'	Report	(yellow card) 62' Gabriel Agú; (yellow card) 65' Guilherme	Stadium: Canindé; Attendance: 4,087; Referee: Felipe Fernandes de Lima

==== Round of 32 ====
4 July First leg	Marcílio Dias	1–1	Portuguesa	Itajaí
18:00	Davi Torres 15', (yellow card) 37'; Wesley (yellow card) 24'	Report	3', (yellow card) 36' Igor Torres; (yellow card) 56' Botteghin; (yellow card) 86' Eduardo Biazus; (yellow card) 89' Bertinato	Stadium: Estádio Hercílio Luz; Attendance: 2,605; Referee: Paulo Roberto Alves Junior

12 July Second leg	Portuguesa	2–0 (3–1 agg.)	Marcílio Dias	São Paulo
16:00	Lucas Hipólito 8'; João Vitor (yellow card) 24'; Guilherme Portuga (yellow card) 45'; Cadorini 67'	Report	(yellow card) 11' (yellow-red card) 34' Roldan; (yellow card) 29' Claudinho	Stadium: Canindé; Attendance: 4,263; Referee: Wagner Silveira Echevarria

==== Round of 16 ====
18 July First leg	Uberlândia	2–0	Portuguesa	Uberlândia
17:00	Jhonatan Lima 15'; Kayke (yellow card) 45+1'; Evanderson (yellow card) 55'; Léo Reis 77'; Diego Fumaça (yellow card) 86'	Report	(yellow card) 20' Eduardo Biazus; (red card) 45+1' Cadorini; (yellow card) 66' João Vitor; (yellow card) 71' Guilherme Portuga	Stadium: Estádio Parque do Sabiá; Attendance: 10,316; Referee: Julio Cesar Pfleger

25 July Second leg	Portuguesa	1–0 (1–2 agg.)	Uberlândia	São Paulo
16:00	Lucas Hipólito (yellow card) 39'; João Diogo (yellow card) 45'; Toró 76' (pen.)	Report	(yellow card) 56' Calazans	Stadium: Canindé; Referee: Wagner do Nascimento Magalhães
