= Guilherme Santos =

Guilherme Santos may refer to:

- Guilherme Santos (footballer, born 1988), Brazilian football leftback
- Guilherme Santos (footballer, born 2001), Brazilian football winger
- Guilherme Caribé, Brazilian swimmer
