= Carlos Eduardo (footballer, born 2001) =

Brazilian footballer

Personal information
- Full name: Carlos Eduardo da Silva Rodrigues Lima
- Date of birth: 6 April 2001 (age 25)
- Place of birth: Taboão da Serra, Brazil
- Height: 1.89 m (6 ft 2 in)
- Position: Centre-back

Team information
- Current team: Portuguesa (on loan from Tochigi City)
- Number: 39

Youth career
- 2017–2021: XV de Piracicaba
- 2018–2019: → Corinthians (loan)
- 2019–2021: → Internacional (loan)

Senior career*
Years	Team	Apps	(Gls)
2019–2021	XV de Piracicaba	0	(0)
2019	→ Corinthians (loan)	0	(0)
2020–2021	→ Internacional (loan)	1	(0)
2021–2023	Louletano	35	(1)
2021–2022	Louletano B	2	(0)
2023–	Tochigi City	20	(1)
2026–	→ Portuguesa (loan)	18	(0)
- * Club domestic league appearances and goals as of 20:53, 22 July 2026 (UTC)

Carlos Eduardo da Silva Rodrigues Lima (born 6 April 2001), known as Carlos Eduardo or Carlos Lima, is a Brazilian professional footballer who plays as a centre-back for Portuguesa, on loan from J2 League club Tochigi City.

== Career ==
Born in Taboão da Serra, São Paulo, Carlos Eduardo started his career in a social project in Piracicaba before joining the youth sides of XV de Piracicaba. He moved to Corinthians' youth sides in 2018, before making his first senior appearance with an under-23 side on 30 June 2019, coming on as a late substitute in a 1–0 home win over Taubaté, for the year's Copa Paulista.

On 16 September 2019, Carlos Eduardo moved to Internacional, being initially a member of the under-20 team before being promoted to the main squad in January 2020. He made his professional debut with Internacional in a 2–0 Campeonato Gaúcho win over Novo Hamburgo on 8 February 2020. It was his only appearance with the first team, however, and he returned to the under-20s before leaving on 4 September 2021.

On 1 October 2021, Carlos Eduardo moved abroad and joined Campeonato de Portugal side Louletano. On 6 April 2023, after becoming a starter, he joined Japanese side Tochigi City in the regional leagues.

On 15 December 2024, after being a backup option as Tochigi achieved two consecutive promotions as champions, Carlos Eduardo renewed his contract until the end of 2025. On 9 December 2025, after another promotion, he was loaned to Portuguesa back in his home country until the following September.

== Career statistics ==
As of 22 July 2026

Club	Season	League			State League		Cup		Continental		Other		Total	
Club	Season	Division	Apps	Goals	Apps	Goals	Apps	Goals	Apps	Goals	Apps	Goals	Apps	Goals
Corinthians	2019	Série A	—		—		—		—		1 (Note: Appearance(s) in Copa Paulista)	0	1	0
Internacional	2020	Série A	—		1	0	—		—		—		1	0
Louletano	2021–22	Campeonato de Portugal	13	0	—		1	0	—		—		14	0
Louletano	2022–23	AF Algarve 1ª Divisão	22	1	—		—		—		2 (Note: Appearance(s) in AF Algarve Taça)	0	24	1
Louletano	Total		35	1	—		1	0	—		2	0	38	1
Louletano B	2021–22	AF Algarve 1ª Divisão	2	0	—		—		—		—		2	0
Tochigi City	2023	Kantō Soccer League Division 1	3	1	—		—		—		7 (Note: One appearance in All Japan Senior Football Championship, six appearances in Japanese Regional Football Champions League)	0	10	1
Tochigi City	2024	Japan Football League	8	0	—		1	0	—		—		9	0
Tochigi City	2025	J3 League	3	0	—		0	0	—		1 (Note: Appearance(s) in J.League Cup)	0	4	0
Tochigi City	Total		14	1	—		1	0	—		8	0	23	1
Portuguesa	2026	Série D	13	0	5	0	1	0	—		—		19	0
Career total			64	2	6	0	3	0	0	0	11	0	83	2

== Honours ==
Tochigi City

- Japanese Regional Football Champions League: 2023
- Japan Football League: 2024
- J3 League: 2025
