= Guilherme Portuga =

Brazilian footballer

- Portuga with Oeste in 2023

Personal information
- Full name: Guilherme Maciel Dantas
- Date of birth: 16 July 1998 (age 28)
- Place of birth: Taboão da Serra, Brazil
- Height: 1.76 m (5 ft 9 in)
- Position: Midfielder

Team information
- Current team: Portuguesa
- Number: 20

Youth career
- Benfica
- 2017–2018: Juventus-SP

Senior career*
Years	Team	Apps	(Gls)
2016	Barcelona-SP	7	(0)
2018	Juventus-SP	0	(0)
2019–2020	Grêmio	0	(0)
2020	→ Esportivo (loan)	0	(0)
2021–2022	São Caetano	19	(5)
2022–2023	São Bernardo	5	(0)
2023	→ Oeste (loan)	16	(3)
2023	Camboriú	3	(0)
2023	Oeste	0	(0)
2024	Galo Maringá	11	(1)
2024–	Portuguesa	43	(2)
2024	→ Ponte Preta (loan)	4	(0)
2026	→ Londrina (loan)	13	(1)
- * Club domestic league appearances and goals as of 20:37, 10 November 2026 (UTC)

Guilherme Maciel Dantas (born 16 July 1998), known as Guilherme Portuga or just Portuga, is a Brazilian footballer who plays as a midfielder for Portuguesa.

== Career ==
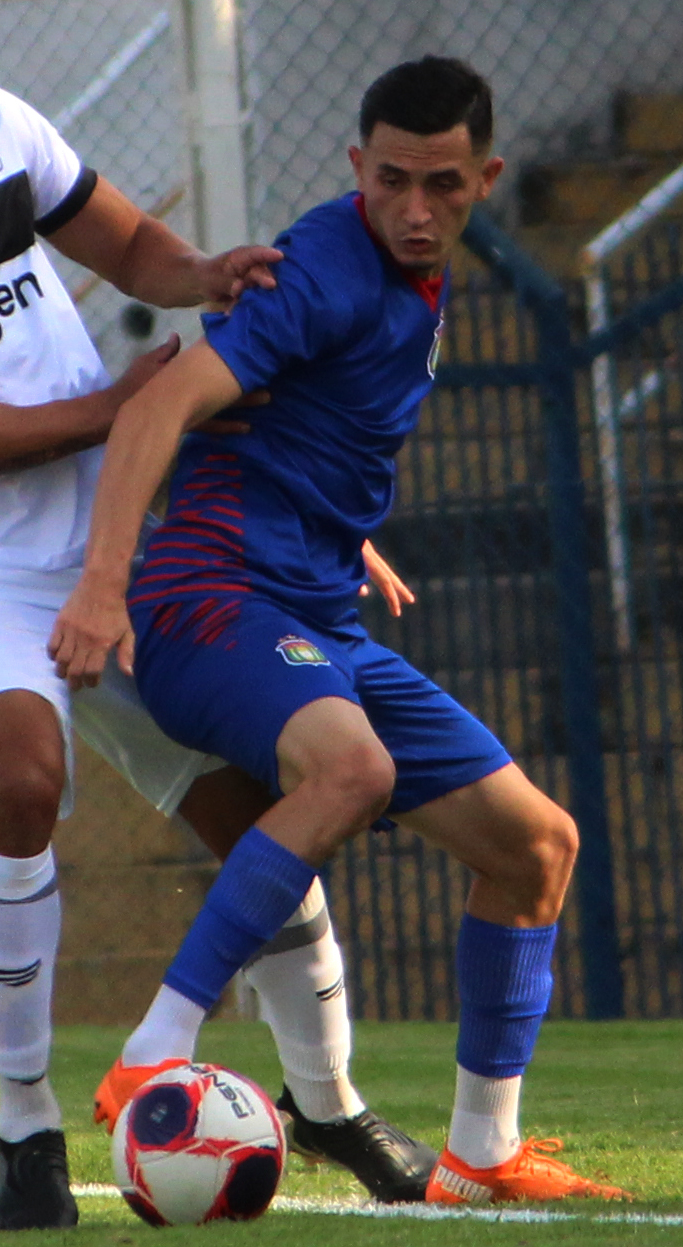
Portuga playing for São Caetano in 2021

Born in Taboão da Serra, São Paulo, Portuga earned his nickname after playing for the youth sides of Portuguese side Benfica, but made his senior debut with Barcelona-SP in the 2016 Campeonato Paulista Segunda Divisão. In 2017, he moved to Juventus-SP and returned to the youth setup.

Portuga made his debut for Juventus on 5 August 2018, in a 1–0 home loss to Atibaia, for the year's Copa Paulista. After impressing during the competition, he signed for Grêmio on 3 December.

After featuring with the under-23 team, Portuga was loaned to Esportivo on 12 February 2020. After making no appearances, he returned to Grêmio and featured with the under-23s before leaving as his contract ended.

On 24 February 2021, Portuga was announced at São Caetano. A backup option during the 2021 Campeonato Paulista as the club suffered relegation, he became a starter afterwards.

On 20 April 2022, Portuga joined Série D side São Bernardo. On 16 November, after achieving promotion, he was loaned to Oeste.

Announced at Camboriú for the fourth division on 11 May 2023, Portuga subsequently returned to Oeste for the year's Copa Paulista. On 2 November, he agreed to a contract with Galo Maringá for the upcoming season.

On 8 May 2024, Portuga confirmed his move to Portuguesa for the state cup. On 31 July, however, he joined Série B side Ponte Preta on loan for the remainder of the year.

Back to Lusa for the 2025 season, Portuga became an undisputed starter for the club, and renewed his contract until November 2027 on 18 May 2026. On 30 July of that year, he was loaned to second division side Londrina.

== Career statistics ==
As of 10 November 2026

Club	Season	League			State League		Cup		Continental		Other		Total	
Club	Season	Division	Apps	Goals	Apps	Goals	Apps	Goals	Apps	Goals	Apps	Goals	Apps	Goals
Barcelona-SP	2016	Paulista 2ª Divisão	—		7	0	—		—		—		7	0
Juventus-SP	2018	Paulista A2	—		—		—		—		17 (Note: Appearance(s) in Copa Paulista)	5	17	5
Grêmio	2019	Série A	0	0	—		—		—		6 (Note: Appearance(s) in Copa FGF)	1	6	1
Esportivo (loan)	2020	Gaúcho	—		0	0	—		—		—		0	0
São Caetano	2021	Paulista	—		4	0	—		—		12	4	16	4
São Caetano	2022	Paulista A2	—		15	5	—		—		—		15	5
São Caetano	Total		—		19	5	—		—		12	4	31	9
São Bernardo	2022	Série D	5	0	—		—		—		—		5	0
Oeste	2023	Paulista A2	—		16	3	—		—		10	1	26	4
Camboriú	2023	Série D	3	0	—		—		—		—		3	0
Galo Maringá	2024	Paranaense	—		11	1	—		—		—		11	1
Portuguesa	2024	Paulista	—		—		—		—		6	4	6	4
Portuguesa	2025	Série D	15	1	5	0	1	0	—		—		21	1
Portuguesa	2026	Série D	15	1	8	0	3	0	—		—		26	1
Portuguesa	Total		30	2	13	0	4	0	—		6	4	53	6
Ponte Preta (loan)	2024	Série B	4	0	—		—		—		—		4	0
Londrina (loan)	2026	Série B	13	1	—		—		—		1 (Note: Appearance(s) in Copa Paraná)	0	14	1
Career total			55	3	66	9	4	0	0	0	52	15	177	27
