= Lohan (footballer) =

Brazilian professional footballer

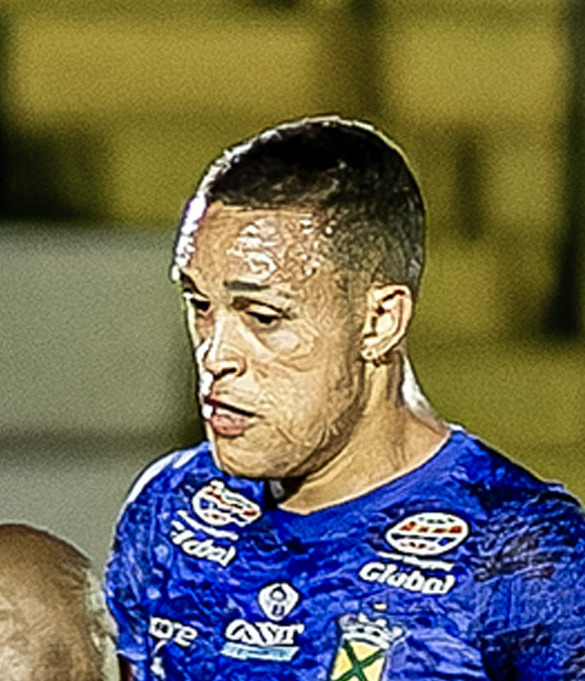
- Lohan playing for Santo André in 2024

Personal information
- Full name: Lohan dos Santos Freire
- Date of birth: 20 September 1995 (age 31)
- Place of birth: Carmo, Brazil
- Height: 1.91 m (6 ft 3 in)
- Position: Forward

Team information
- Current team: Portuguesa-RJ

Youth career
- 2012–2016: Friburguense
- 2013: → Cruzeiro (loan)

Senior career*
Years	Team	Apps	(Gls)
2013–2020	Friburguense	64	(28)
2016	→ Macaé (loan)	3	(0)
2017	→ Resende (loan)	4	(0)
2018	→ Resende (loan)	8	(2)
2019	→ CSA (loan)	3	(1)
2019	→ ABC (loan)	5	(2)
2020	→ Botafogo-PB (loan)	16	(7)
2020–2021	América Mineiro	6	(0)
2021	→ Confiança (loan)	9	(1)
2022–2023	Criciúma	51	(10)
2024	Santo André	11	(3)
2024	Floresta	17	(3)
2024	Guarani	9	(0)
2025	Portuguesa-RJ	10	(4)
2025–2026	Portuguesa	14	(4)
2026–	Portuguesa-RJ	0	(0)
- * Club domestic league appearances and goals as of 19:56, 19 January 2026 (UTC)

Lohan dos Santos Freire (born 20 September 1995), simply known as Lohan, is a Brazilian professional footballer who plays as a forward for Portuguesa-RJ.

== Career ==
Lohan was born in Carmo, Rio de Janeiro, and joined Friburguense's youth sides in 2012 after a trial period. After making his first team debut in the 2013 Campeonato Carioca, he was loaned to Cruzeiro in May of that year and returned to the under-20 squad.

Back to Frizão for the 2014 season, Lohan failed to establish himself as a starter, and was loaned to Macaé in April 2016. Back to Friburguense for the 2016 Copa Rio, he scored 11 goals during the competition, including a hat-trick in a 5–0 away win over Rio São Paulo.

On 31 October 2016, Lohan moved to Resende on loan. After featuring rarely, he returned to Friburguense, where he scored 13 goals in 19 matches before returning to Resende again on loan on 24 October 2017.

Lohan was again the top scorer of Friburguense in the 2018 season, and initially agreed to join Portuguesa-RJ in October of that year. On 4 December, however, he moved to Série A side CSA.

After being rarely used, Lohan moved to ABC on 24 June 2019, still owned by Friburguense. On 18 September, he moved to Botafogo-PB also on loan, and scored ten goals in all competitions for the side before leaving for América Mineiro on 5 October 2020.

On 8 September 2021, after only one appearance for América during the entire year, Lohan was announced on loan at Confiança. The following 10 January, he moved to Criciúma, and agreed to a contract extension on 7 November 2022.

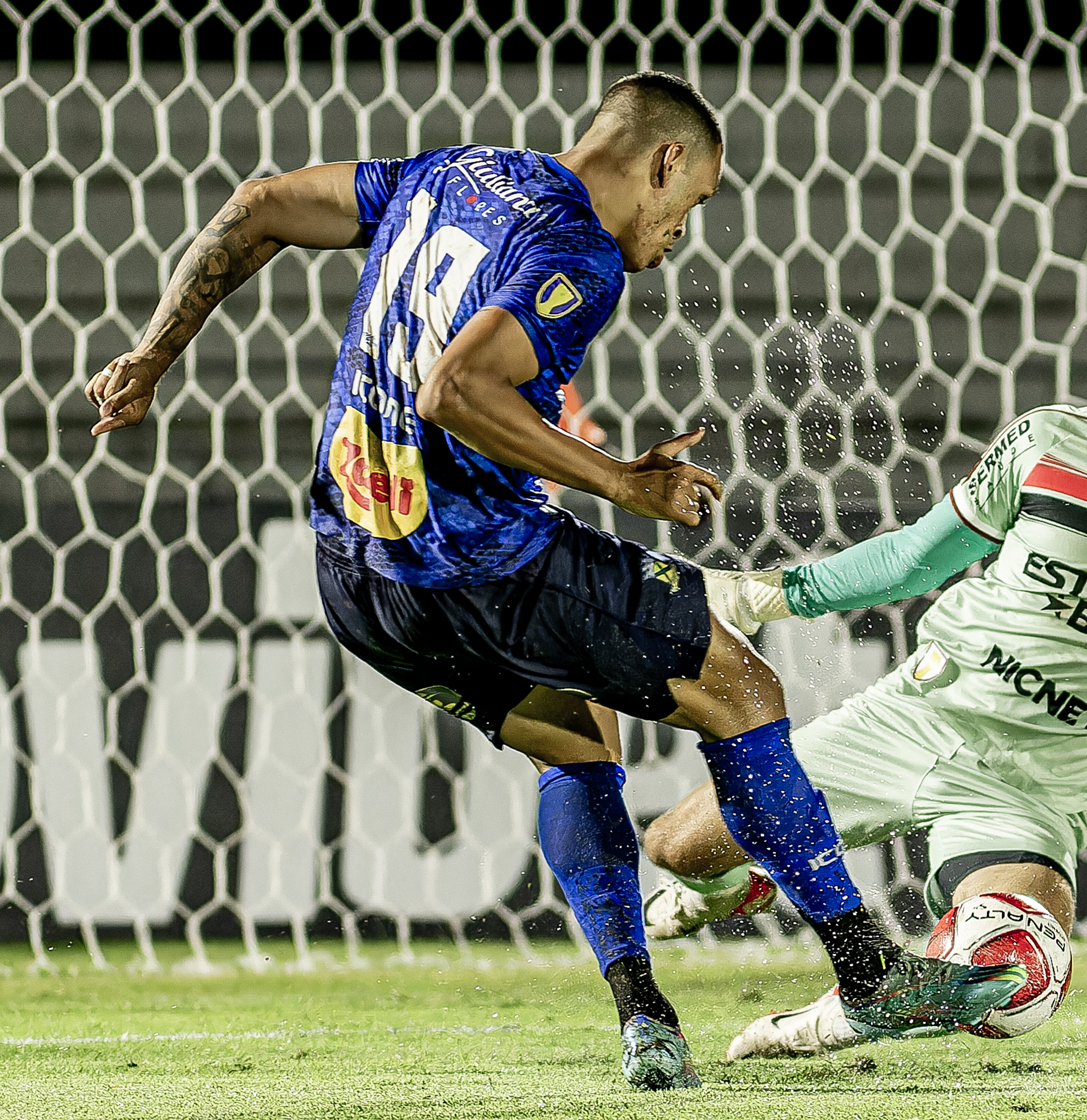
Lohan playing for Santo André in 2024

On 8 January 2024, Lohan rescinded his contract with Criciúma, and joined Santo André seven days later. He moved to Floresta on 12 April, but agreed to a deal with Guarani on 24 August.

Lohan began the 2025 campaign at Portuguesa-RJ, before moving to homonymous Portuguesa on 31 March of that year. On 10 February 2026, he left Lusa to return to his previous club.

== Career statistics ==
As of 19 January 2026

Club	Season	League			State league		Cup		Continental		Other		Total	
Club	Season	Division	Apps	Goals	Apps	Goals	Apps	Goals	Apps	Goals	Apps	Goals	Apps	Goals
Friburguense	2013	Carioca	—		11	0	—		—		—		11	0
Friburguense	2014	Carioca	—		8	0	—		—		4 (Note: Appearance(s) in Copa Rio)	0	12	0
Friburguense	2015	Carioca	—		3	0	—		—		6	1	9	1
Friburguense	2016	Carioca	—		6	1	—		—		11	11	17	12
Friburguense	2017	Carioca Série B1	—		19	13	—		—		—		19	13
Friburguense	2018	Carioca Série B1	—		17	14	—		—		8	4	25	18
Friburguense	Total		—		64	28	—		—		29	16	93	44
Macaé (loan)	2016	Série C	3	0	—		—		—		—		3	0
Resende (loan)	2017	Carioca	—		4	0	—		—		—		4	0
Resende (loan)	2018	Carioca	—		8	2	—		—		—		8	2
CSA (loan)	2019	Série A	0	0	3	1	1	0	—		3 (Note: Appearance(s) in Copa do Nordeste)	0	7	1
ABC (loan)	2019	Série C	5	2	—		—		—		—		5	2
Botafogo-PB	2020	Série C	8	3	8	4	2	0	—		9	3	27	10
América Mineiro	2020	Série B	5	0	—		—		—		—		5	0
América Mineiro	2021	Série A	0	0	1	0	0	0	—		—		1	0
América Mineiro	Total		5	0	1	0	0	0	—		—		6	0
Confiança (loan)	2021	Série B	9	1	—		—		—		1	0	10	1
Criciúma	2022	Série B	17	4	7	3	2	0	—		—		26	7
Criciúma	2023	Série B	10	0	17	3	2	0	—		—		29	3
Criciúma	Total		27	4	24	6	4	0	—		—		55	10
Santo André	2024	Série D	0	0	11	3	—		—		—		11	3
Floresta	2024	Série C	17	3	—		—		—		—		17	3
Guarani	2024	Série B	9	0	—		—		—		—		9	0
Portuguesa-RJ	2025	Carioca	—		11	4	—		—		—		11	4
Portuguesa	2025	Série D	12	4	—		—		—		—		12	4
Portuguesa	2026	Série D	0	0	2	0	0	0	—		—		2	0
Portuguesa	Total		12	4	2	0	0	0	—		—		14	4
Portuguesa-RJ	2026	Série D	0	0	0	0	—		—		—		0	0
Career total			95	17	136	48	7	0	0	0	42	19	260	84
