= Wellington (footballer, born 2005) =

Brazilian footballer

Personal information
- Full name: Wellington Aparecido dos Santos Júnior
- Date of birth: 9 February 2005 (age 21)
- Place of birth: São Paulo, Brazil
- Height: 1.90 m (6 ft 3 in)
- Position: Centre-back

Team information
- Current team: Portuguesa
- Number: 15

Youth career
- 2023–2024: União Suzano
- 2024–2026: Portuguesa

Senior career*
Years	Team	Apps	(Gls)
2024	União Suzano	0	(0)
2026–	Portuguesa	2	(0)
- * Club domestic league appearances and goals as of 01:39, 8 June 2026 (UTC)

Wellington Aparecido dos Santos Júnior (born 9 February 2005), simply known as Wellington, is a Brazilian footballer who plays as a centre-back for Portuguesa.

== Career ==
Born in São Paulo, Wellington began his career with União Suzano. In 2024, he was promoted to the first team ahead of the year's Copa Paulista, and made his senior debut on 17 June by coming on as a late substitute in a 0–0 away draw against Oeste.

Regularly used by USAC, Wellington moved to Portuguesa in late 2024, being initially a member of the under-20 team. In March 2025, he went on a trial at Portuguese side Benfica, but returned to his parent club after nearly two weeks.

On 29 January 2026, Wellington was promoted to the main squad of Lusa. He made his club debut on 30 May, replacing goalscorer Eric Botteghin in a 2–1 Série D away win over Pouso Alegre.

On 14 October 2026, Wellington renewed his contract with Portuguesa until September 2027.

== Career statistics ==
As of 7 June 2026

Club	Season	League			State League		Cup		Continental		Other		Total	
Club	Season	Division	Apps	Goals	Apps	Goals	Apps	Goals	Apps	Goals	Apps	Goals	Apps	Goals
União Suzano	2024	Paulista A3	—		—		—		—		9 (Note: Appearance(s) in Copa Paulista)	0	9	0
Portuguesa	2026	Série D	2	0	0	0	0	0	—		—		2	0
Career total			2	0	0	0	0	0	0	0	9	0	11	0
