= Cauari =

Brazilian footballer (born 2002)

Personal information
- Full name: Cauari Carmo Simão Santos
- Date of birth: 23 September 2002 (age 24)
- Place of birth: Santos, Brazil
- Height: 1.85 m (6 ft 1 in)
- Position: Winger

Team information
- Current team: Hercílio Luz (on loan from Portuguesa)

Youth career
- Delfín
- 2021: Flamengo-SP
- 2022: Votuporanguense
- 2022: → Atlético Goianiense (loan)

Senior career*
Years	Team	Apps	(Gls)
2023	Votuporanguense	4	(0)
2023	Rio Branco-SP	23	(3)
2024–2025	Galo Maringá	5	(0)
2024	→ Aparecidense (loan)	15	(1)
2024	→ Brusque (loan)	3	(0)
2025	→ Velo Clube (loan)	5	(0)
2025–	Portuguesa	29	(5)
2026–	→ Hercílio Luz (loan)	0	(0)
- * Club domestic league appearances and goals as of 14:48, 3 August 2026 (UTC)

Cauari Carmo Simão Santos (born 23 September 2002), simply known as Cauari, is a Brazilian professional footballer who plays as a winger for Hercílio Luz, on loan from Portuguesa.

== Career ==
Born in Santos, São Paulo, Cauari played for Delfín, Flamengo-SP and Votuporanguense as a youth. On 31 March 2022, after impressing with the latter in the Copa São Paulo de Futebol Júnior, he moved to Atlético Goianiense on loan and was assigned to the under-20 squad.

Back to CAV for the 2023 season, Cauari made his senior debut for the side in the year's Campeonato Paulista Série A3, and subsequently played for Rio Branco-SP in the Campeonato Paulista Segunda Divisão. On 3 December 2023, he signed for Galo Maringá.

On 10 April 2024, Cauari agreed to a loan deal with Série C side Aparecidense. After being regularly used, he moved to Brusque in the Série B on 2 September, also in a temporary deal.

On 21 December 2024, Cauari was announced at Velo Clube, still owned by Galo Maringá. He returned to his parent club on 27 March 2025, but moved to Portuguesa on 10 April, after the club bought 50% of his economic rights; he signed a contract until 2027.

On 15 September 2026, Cauari was loaned to Hercílio Luz until the end of the 2027 Campeonato Catarinense.

== Career statistics ==
As of 15 October 2026

Club	Season	League			State league		Cup		Continental		Other		Total	
Club	Season	Division	Apps	Goals	Apps	Goals	Apps	Goals	Apps	Goals	Apps	Goals	Apps	Goals
Votuporanguense	2023	Paulista A3	—		4	0	—		—		—		4	0
Rio Branco-SP	2023	Paulista 2ª Divisão	—		23	3	—		—		—		23	3
Galo Maringá	2024	Paranaense	—		5	0	—		—		—		5	0
Aparecidense (loan)	2024	Série C	15	1	—		—		—		—		15	1
Brusque (loan)	2024	Série B	3	0	—		—		—		—		3	0
Velo Clube (loan)	2025	Paulista	—		5	0	—		—		—		5	0
Portuguesa	2025	Série D	13	2	—		—		—		—		13	2
Portuguesa	2026	Série D	12	2	4	1	2	0	—		—		18	3
Portuguesa	Total		25	4	4	1	2	0	—		—		31	5
Hercílio Luz (loan)	2026	Catarinense Série B	—		—		—		—		2 (Note: Appearance(s) in Copa Santa Catarina)	0	2	0
Career total			43	5	41	4	2	0	0	0	2	0	88	9
