= Lucas Hipólito =

Brazilian footballer (born 1995)

Personal information
- Full name: Lucas Hipólito Cavalcante e Silva
- Date of birth: 14 July 1995 (age 31)
- Place of birth: Belo Horizonte, Brazil
- Height: 1.72 m (5 ft 8 in)
- Position: Left-back

Youth career
- América Mineiro

Senior career*
Years	Team	Apps	(Gls)
2015	Brenes	8	(3)
2016	Noroeste	16	(0)
2016–2019	Tupynambás	36	(0)
2017	→ Novo Horizonte (loan)	6	(0)
2018	→ Noroeste (loan)	13	(0)
2018	→ Coimbra (loan)	15	(0)
2019	Boa Esporte	0	(0)
2020–2021	Coimbra	21	(0)
2020	→ Volta Redonda (loan)	4	(0)
2021	Ferroviária	8	(0)
2022	Villa Nova	11	(0)
2022	Sampaio Corrêa	27	(0)
2023–2024	Operário Ferroviário	39	(2)
2025–2026	Portuguesa	25	(1)
- * Club domestic league appearances and goals as of 14:31, 3 August 2026 (UTC)

Lucas Hipólito Cavalcante e Silva (born 14 July 1995) is a Brazilian footballer who plays as a left-back.

== Career ==
Born in Belo Horizonte, Minas Gerais, Hipólito was an América Mineiro youth graduate. He moved to Spain in 2015, making his senior debut with Tercera Andaluza side Brenes Balompié, later returning to his home country and playing with an amateur side in his hometown before signing for Noroeste.

In 2016, Hipólito joined Tupynambás as the club had just returned to a professional status. He subsequently served loan stints at Novo Horizonte, Noroeste and Coimbra, before signing for Série C side Boa Esporte in May 2019.

In October 2019, Hipólito returned to Coimbra, now on a permanent deal. On 14 September of that year, he moved to Volta Redonda in the third division on loan.

On 27 May 2021, after playing the 2021 Campeonato Mineiro back at Coimbra, Hipólito was announced at Ferroviária. He joined Villa Nova ahead of the 2022 season, and was announced at Série B side Sampaio Corrêa on 6 April of that year.

On 17 November 2022, after suffering relegation, Hipólito agreed to a contract with Operário Ferroviário. Roughly one year later, after achieving promotion, he signed a new one-year deal.

On 19 December 2024, Hipólito was announced at Portuguesa for the upcoming season. A regular starter during the 2025 Campeonato Paulista, he suffered a knee injury in the club's last match of the competition, being sidelined for the remainder of the year.

== Career statistics ==
As of 3 August 2026

Club	Season	League			State League		Cup		Continental		Other		Total	
Club	Season	Division	Apps	Goals	Apps	Goals	Apps	Goals	Apps	Goals	Apps	Goals	Apps	Goals
Brenes	2014–15	Tercera Andaluza	8	3	—		—		—		—		8	3
Noroeste	2016	Paulista A3	—		16	0	—		—		—		16	0
Tupynambás	2016	Mineiro 2ª Divisão	—		9	0	—		—		—		9	0
Tupynambás	2017	Mineiro Módulo II	—		13	0	—		—		—		13	0
Tupynambás	2018	Mineiro Módulo II	—		4	0	—		—		—		4	0
Tupynambás	2019	Mineiro	—		10	0	—		—		—		10	0
Tupynambás	Total		—		36	0	—		—		—		36	0
Novo Horizonte (loan)	2017	Goiano 2ª Divisão	—		6	0	—		—		—		6	0
Nororeste (loan)	2018	Paulista A3	—		13	0	—		—		—		13	0
Coimbra (loan)	2018	Mineiro 2ª Divisão	—		15	0	—		—		—		15	0
Boa Esporte	2019	Série C	0	0	—		—		—		—		0	0
Coimbra	2020	Mineiro	—		10	0	—		—		—		10	0
Coimbra	2021	Mineiro	—		11	0	—		—		—		11	0
Coimbra	Total		—		21	0	—		—		—		21	0
Volta Redonda (loan)	2020	Série C	4	0	—		—		—		—		4	0
Ferroviária	2021	Série D	8	0	—		—		—		—		8	0
Villa Nova	2022	Mineiro	—		11	0	—		—		—		11	0
Sampaio Corrêa	2022	Série B	27	0	—		—		—		—		27	0
Operário Ferroviário	2023	Série C	9	1	11	0	1	0	—		—		21	1
Operário Ferroviário	2024	Série B	11	0	8	1	3	0	—		—		22	1
Operário Ferroviário	Total		20	1	19	1	4	0	—		—		43	2
Portuguesa	2025	Série D	0	0	11	0	0	0	—		—		11	0
Portuguesa	2026	Série D	14	1	0	0	0	0	—		—		14	1
Portuguesa	Total		14	1	11	0	0	0	—		—		25	1
Career total			81	5	148	1	4	0	0	0	0	0	233	6
