= Mateus Cecchini =

Brazilian footballer

Personal information
- Full name: Mateus Cecchini Müller
- Date of birth: 25 February 2003 (age 23)
- Place of birth: Porto Alegre, Brazil
- Height: 1.88 m (6 ft 2 in)
- Position: Defensive midfielder

Team information
- Current team: SC Bregenz
- Number: 80

Youth career
- Internacional
- 2020–2023: Virtus Entella
- 2021–2022: → Inter Milan (loan)
- 2022–2023: → Sampdoria (loan)

Senior career*
Years	Team	Apps	(Gls)
2021–2024	Virtus Entella	2	(0)
2024–2025	SV Stripfing	32	(4)
2026	Portuguesa	16	(1)
2026–	SC Bregenz	5	(0)
- * Club domestic league appearances and goals as of 19:02, 13 October 2026 (UTC)

Mateus Cecchini Müller (born 25 February 2003) is a Brazilian footballer who plays as a defensive midfielder for Austrian club SC Bregenz.

== Career ==
Born in Porto Alegre, Rio Grande do Sul, Cecchini played for the youth sides of Internacional before moving to Italian club Virtus Entella in 2020; initially an attacking midfielder, he switched to a defensive midfielder role after arriving in Europe. He made his first team debut with the latter on 10 May 2021, coming on as a second-half substitute for Leonardo Morosini in a 3–2 Serie B away loss to Pisa.

On 11 August 2021, Cecchini was loaned to Inter Milan, being initially a member of their Primavera squad. The club opted to not activate his buyout clause in June 2022, and he subsequently moved to Sampdoria also in a temporary deal.

Back to Virtus in July 2023, Cecchini became a permanent member of the main squad now in Serie C, but only played in two matches during the entire season. On 30 June 2024, he was announced at Austrian 2. Liga side SV Stripfing.

Cecchini scored his first professional goal on 11 April 2025, netting the winner in a 2–1 home success over SKN St. Pölten. Regularly used, he renewed his contract on 20 June of that year.

On 26 December 2025, Cecchini returned to his home country after joining Portuguesa on a one-year deal. Mainly a backup option, he was released the following 5 August.

== Career statistics ==
As of 3 August 2026

Club	Season	League			State League		Cup		Continental		Other		Total	
Club	Season	Division	Apps	Goals	Apps	Goals	Apps	Goals	Apps	Goals	Apps	Goals	Apps	Goals
Virtus Entella	2020–21	Serie B	1	0	—		—		—		—		1	0
Virtus Entella	2023–24	Serie C	1	0	—		0	0	—		1 (Note: Appearance(s) in Coppa Italia Serie C)	0	2	0
Virtus Entella	Total		2	0	—		0	0	—		1	0	3	0
SV Stripfing	2024–25	2. Liga	21	3	—		3	0	—		—		24	3
SV Stripfing	2025–26	2. Liga	11	1	—		3	1	—		—		14	2
SV Stripfing	Total		32	4	—		6	1	—		—		38	5
Portuguesa	2026	Série D	11	1	5	0	1	0	—		—		17	1
Career total			45	5	5	0	7	1	0	0	1	0	58	6
