= Felipe Tontini =

Brazilian footballer (born 1995)

Personal information
- Full name: Felipe Tontini da Silveira
- Date of birth: 16 July 1995 (age 31)
- Place of birth: Foz do Iguaçu, Brazil
- Height: 1.83 m (6 ft 0 in)
- Position: Attacking midfielder

Team information
- Current team: Portuguesa
- Number: 8

Youth career
- 2010–2011: Guarani
- 2011–2015: Grêmio

Senior career*
Years	Team	Apps	(Gls)
2015–2019	Grêmio	2	(0)
2017	→ Ceará (loan)	14	(0)
2018	→ Helsingør (loan)	10	(2)
2020–2021	Caxias	29	(2)
2022	XV de Piracicaba	15	(0)
2022	Ypiranga-RS	14	(1)
2023–2024	Operário Ferroviário	2	(0)
2024	Caxias	6	(2)
2025–2026	São Luiz	25	(2)
2026–	Portuguesa	2	(0)
- * Club domestic league appearances and goals as of 14:49, 3 August 2026 (UTC)

Felipe Tontini da Silveira (born 16 July 1995) is a Brazilian footballer who plays as an attacking midfielder for Portuguesa.

== Career ==
Born in Foz do Iguaçu, Paraná, Tontini joined Grêmio's youth sides in 2011, from Guarani. He was first included in a senior matchday squad on 1 November 2015, remaining an unused substitute in their 2–0 home win over Flamengo in the Campeonato Brasileiro Série A; he made two further appearances on the bench that month.

On 10 February 2016, Tontini made his senior debut in a 1–0 win at Veranópolis in that year's Campeonato Gaúcho, replacing Giuliano after 61 minutes. He only played in a further match in that year, a 3–1 away win over Cruzeiro-RS roughly a month later.

On 12 January 2017, Tontini moved to Série B side Ceará on a season-long loan. In September, after being demoted to a reserve side which was playing in the Taça Fares Lopes, his loan was terminated.

On 31 January 2018, Tontini moved on loan to Danish Superliga club FC Helsingør. Back to Grêmio in July after scoring twice in ten matches, he was assigned to the under-23 team and played in the Copa FGF.

On 3 February 2020, Tontini terminated his link with Grêmio, and joined Caxias. On 20 December 2021, he moved to XV de Piracicaba for the upcoming season.

Regularly used at XV, Tontini returned to Rio Grande do Sul on 4 April 2022, after signing for Ypiranga-RS. He joined Operário Ferroviário on 14 November, and despite suffering a knee injury which sidelined him for most of the 2023 season, he had his contract renewed on 2 November of that year.

On 4 July 2024, after making no appearances during the first half of the year, Tontini left Operário, and returned to Caxias. On 12 November, he was announced at São Luiz.

On 12 March 2026, Portuguesa announced the signing of Tontini until the end of the year.

== Career statistics ==
As of 3 August 2026

Club	Season	League			State League		Cup		Continental		Other		Total	
Club	Season	Division	Apps	Goals	Apps	Goals	Apps	Goals	Apps	Goals	Apps	Goals	Apps	Goals
Grêmio	2016	Série A	0	0	2	0	0	0	—		0	0	2	0
Grêmio	2018	Série A	0	0	—		—		—		13 (Note: Appearance(s) in Copa FGF)	4	13	4
Grêmio	2019	Série A	0	0	—		—		—		6	1	6	1
Grêmio	Total		0	0	2	0	0	0	—		19	5	21	5
Ceará (loan)	2017	Série B	1	0	6	0	1	0	—		6 (Note: Three appearances in Primeira Liga, three appearances in Taça Fares Lopes)	0	14	0
Helsingør (loan)	2017–18	Danish Superliga	10	2	—		—		—		—		10	2
Caxias	2020	Série D	9	1	4	0	—		—		—		13	1
Caxias	2021	Série D	4	0	11	1	1	0	—		—		16	1
Caxias	Total		13	1	15	1	1	0	—		—		29	2
XV de Piracicaba	2022	Paulista A2	—		15	0	—		—		—		15	0
Ypiranga-RS	2022	Série C	14	1	—		—		—		—		14	1
Operário Ferroviário	2023	Série C	0	0	2	0	0	0	—		—		2	0
Operário Ferroviário	2024	Série B	0	0	0	0	0	0	—		—		0	0
Operário Ferroviário	Total		0	0	2	0	0	0	—		—		2	0
Caxias	2024	Série C	6	2	—		—		—		—		6	2
São Luiz	2025	Série D	13	1	5	1	—		—		—		18	2
São Luiz	2026	Série D	0	0	7	0	1	0	—		—		8	0
São Luiz	Total		13	1	12	1	1	0	—		—		26	2
Portuguesa	2026	Série D	2	0	—		1	0	—		—		3	0
Career total			59	7	52	2	4	0	0	0	25	5	140	14

== Honours ==
Ceará

- Campeonato Cearense: 2017
