= Hudson (footballer, born 2001) =

Brazilian footballer

Personal information
- Full name: Hudson Alexandre Batista da Silva
- Date of birth: 14 January 2001 (age 25)
- Place of birth: São Paulo, Brazil
- Height: 1.81 m (5 ft 11 in)
- Position: Defensive midfielder

Youth career
- 2016: Itapirense
- 2017–2021: Juventude
- 2020–2021: → Portuguesa (loan)
- 2022: Portuguesa

Senior career*
Years	Team	Apps	(Gls)
2021	Juventude	0	(0)
2021	→ Portuguesa (loan)	1	(0)
2022–2026	Portuguesa	35	(0)
2024	→ Patrocinense (loan)	8	(2)
2024	→ Ponte Preta (loan)	10	(0)
2025	→ Criciúma (loan)	4	(0)
2025	→ Juventude (loan)	4	(0)
- * Club domestic league appearances and goals as of 01:32, 8 June 2026 (UTC)

Hudson Alexandre Batista da Silva (born 14 January 2001), simply known as Hudson, is a Brazilian footballer who plays as a defensive midfielder.

== Club career ==
Hudson was born in São Paulo, and began his career at Itapirense in 2016. In the following year, he moved to Juventude, but returned to his hometown in 2020 after joining Portuguesa on loan.

Initially assigned to the under-20 team, Hudson made his senior debut for Lusa on 5 June 2021, coming on as a late substitute for Ermínio in a 2–2 Série D home draw against Cianorte. In December 2021, he signed a permanent deal with Portuguesa.

On 27 June 2022, after helping Portuguesa in their promotion from the Campeonato Paulista Série A2 as champions with seven matches, Hudson renewed his contract until November 2024. On 12 December 2023, he was loaned to Patrocinense for the upcoming season.

Upon returning, Hudson played for Lusa in the first rounds of the 2024 Copa Paulista before being loaned out to Série B side Ponte Preta on 31 July of that year. Upon returning, he was a regular starter in the 2025 Campeonato Paulista before moving to Criciúma also in a temporary deal on 28 February 2025.

On 11 June 2025, Hudson's loan with Criciúma was cut short. Sixteen days later, Portuguesa confirmed another loan move, now to Juventude in the Série A.

Hudson made his top tier debut on 14 July 2025, starting in a 2–1 home win over Sport Recife. On 18 November, his loan was cut short, and he was regularly used back at Lusa before renewing his contract until 2027 on 19 June 2026.

In October 2026, Hudson had his contract with Portuguesa rescinded after playing in an amateur match in his hometown; while the club alleged he was under treatment for a foot injury, the player alleged he was cleared to play and was also on holiday.

== Career statistics ==
As of 7 June 2026

Club	Season	League			State League		Cup		Continental		Other		Total	
Club	Season	Division	Apps	Goals	Apps	Goals	Apps	Goals	Apps	Goals	Apps	Goals	Apps	Goals
Portuguesa	2021	Série D	1	0	—		—		—		2 (Note: Appearance(s) in Copa Paulista)	0	3	0
Portuguesa	2022	Paulista A2	—		7	0	—		—		7	0	14	0
Portuguesa	2023	Paulista	—		4	0	—		—		11	0	15	0
Portuguesa	2024	Paulista	—		—		—		—		6	0	6	0
Portuguesa	2025	Série D	0	0	10	0	0	0	—		—		10	0
Portuguesa	2026	Série D	7	0	7	0	3	0	—		—		17	0
Portuguesa	Total		8	0	28	0	3	0	—		26	0	65	0
Patrocinense (loan)	2024	Série D	—		8	2	—		—		—		8	2
Ponte Preta (loan)	2024	Série B	10	0	—		—		—		—		10	0
Criciúma (loan)	2025	Série B	4	0	—		1	0	—		—		5	0
Juventude (loan)	2025	Série A	4	0	—		—		—		1 (Note: Appearance(s) in Copa FGF)	0	5	0
Career total			26	0	36	2	4	0	0	0	27	0	93	2

== Honours ==
Portuguesa

- Campeonato Paulista Série A2: 2022
