= Eduardo Biazus =

Brazilian footballer (born 2001)

Personal information
- Full name: Eduardo Henrique Biazus
- Date of birth: 13 March 2001 (age 25)
- Place of birth: Curitiba, Brazil
- Height: 1.86 m (6 ft 1 in)
- Position: Centre-back

Team information
- Current team: Portuguesa
- Number: 4

Youth career
- 2014–2017: Paraná
- 2018: Andraus
- 2019: J. Malucelli
- 2019–2021: São Joseense

Senior career*
Years	Team	Apps	(Gls)
2021–2022	São Joseense	0	(0)
2021–2022	→ Foz do Iguaçu (loan)	23	(1)
2022	→ Grêmio Prudente (loan)	10	(3)
2022	→ Patriotas (loan)	8	(0)
2023–2025	Grêmio Prudente	20	(2)
2023	→ São Bernardo (loan)	3	(0)
2024–2025	→ CSA (loan)	23	(0)
2025–	Portuguesa	40	(1)
2025	→ CSA (loan)	2	(0)
- * Club domestic league appearances and goals as of 14:29, 3 August 2026 (UTC)

Eduardo Henrique Biazus (born 13 March 2001), known as Eduardo Biazus, is a Brazilian professional footballer who plays for Portuguesa. Mainly a centre-back, he can also play as a defensive midfielder.

== Career ==
Biazus was born in Curitiba, Paraná, and represented Paraná Clube, Andraus, J. Malucelli and São Joseense as a youth. He made his senior debut while on loan at Foz do Iguaçu in 2021, helping the side to achieve promotion from the Campeonato Paranaense Série Bronze.

In July 2022, after winning the year's Campeonato Paranaense Série Prata with Foz, Biazus moved to Grêmio Prudente also on loan. He also won the Campeonato Paulista Segunda Divisão with the side, but finished the year at Patriotas.

On 23 November 2022, Biazus returned to Grêmio Prudente, now on a permanent contract. After being an undisputed starter for the side, he moved to Série C side São Bernardo on loan.

On 29 November 2023, Biazus was announced at fellow third division side CSA, with a buyout clause. On 7 January 2025, he left the club and signed for Portuguesa.

On 14 August 2025, after Lusa's elimination from the Série D, Biazus returned to CSA again on loan.

== Career statistics ==
As of 3 August 2026

Club	Season	League			State League		Cup		Continental		Other		Total	
Club	Season	Division	Apps	Goals	Apps	Goals	Apps	Goals	Apps	Goals	Apps	Goals	Apps	Goals
Foz do Iguaçu	2021	Paranaense Série Bronze	—		11	0	—		—		—		11	0
Foz do Iguaçu	2022	Paranaense Série Prata	—		12	1	—		—		—		12	1
Foz do Iguaçu	Total		—		23	1	—		—		—		23	1
Grêmio Prudente (loan)	2022	Paulista 2ª Divisão	—		10	3	—		—		—		10	3
Patriotas (loan)	2022	Paranaense Série Bronze	—		8	0	—		—		—		8	0
Grêmio Prudente	2023	Paulista A3	—		20	2	—		—		8 (Note: Appearance(s) in Copa Paulista)	0	28	2
São Bernardo (loan)	2023	Série C	3	0	—		—		—		—		3	0
CSA (loan)	2024	Série C	15	0	8	0	—		—		8 (Note: One appearance in Copa do Nordeste, seven appearances in Copa Alagoas)	0	31	0
CSA (loan)	2025	Série C	2	0	0	0	—		—		1 (Note: Appearance(s) in Copa do Nordeste)	0	3	0
CSA (loan)	Total		17	0	8	0	—		—		9	0	34	0
Portuguesa	2025	Série D	14	0	8	0	1	0	—		—		23	0
Portuguesa	2026	Série D	10	1	8	0	3	0	—		—		21	1
Portuguesa	Total		24	1	16	0	4	0	—		—		44	1
Career total			44	1	84	6	4	0	0	0	17	0	149	7

== Honours ==
Foz do Iguaçu

- Campeonato Paranaense Série Prata: 2022

Grêmio Prudente

- Campeonato Paulista Segunda Divisão: 2022

CSA

- Copa Alagoas: 2024
