= João Paulo (footballer, born 2001) =

Brazilian footballer

Personal information
- Full name: João Paulo Ribeiro Sovinski
- Date of birth: 8 March 2001 (age 25)
- Place of birth: Guarapuava, Brazil
- Height: 1.86 m (6 ft 1 in)
- Position: Goalkeeper

Team information
- Current team: SC Bregenz
- Number: 1

Youth career
- Grêmio
- Internacional
- 2018–2021: Chapecoense

Senior career*
Years	Team	Apps	(Gls)
2021–2025	Chapecoense	50	(0)
2024	→ Santo André (loan)	0	(0)
2025–2026	Portuguesa	1	(0)
2026–	SC Bregenz	2	(0)
- * Club domestic league appearances and goals as of 18:57, 13 October 2026 (UTC)

João Paulo Ribeiro Sovinski (born 8 March 2001), known as João Paulo, is a Brazilian footballer who plays as a goalkeeper for Austrian club SC Bregenz.

== Career ==
=== Chapecoense ===
Born in Guarapuava, Paraná, João Paulo joined Chapecoense's youth setup in 2018, after representing Grêmio and Internacional. He made his first team debut on 25 February 2021, starting in a 2–0 Campeonato Catarinense away win against Concórdia.

João Paulo subsequently lost his starting spot to Keiller in late March 2021, and remained as a second-choice after the recovery of Tiepo. On 5 April of that year, he renewed his contract until the end of 2024.

João Paulo made his Série A debut on 13 June 2021, coming on as a first-half substitute for injured Tiepo in a 0–0 home draw against Ceará. He still managed to end the season as a starter ahead of Keiller and Tiepo, featuring in 20 league appearances as the club suffered relegation.

Demoted to third-choice during the 2022 campaign, João Paulo was loaned to Santo André on 21 December 2023. However, he suffered a knee injury during a training in January, only returning to training in November 2024.

In the 2025 season, João Paulo was a first-choice during the year's Catarinense after profiting from the injury of starter Léo Vieira.

=== Portuguesa ===
On 8 April 2025, João Paulo was announced at Portuguesa, after the club acquired 70% of his economic rights. A backup to Bruno Bertinato, he only made his debut on 9 May 2026, starting in a 1–0 away loss to Madureira, and was released on 5 August.

== Career statistics ==
As of 11 May 2026

Club	Season	League			State League		Cup		Continental		Other		Total	
Club	Season	Division	Apps	Goals	Apps	Goals	Apps	Goals	Apps	Goals	Apps	Goals	Apps	Goals
Chapecoense	2021	Série A	20	0	4	0	0	0	—		0	0	24	0
Chapecoense	2022	Série B	0	0	10	0	1	0	—		0	0	11	0
Chapecoense	2023	Série B	7	0	0	0	0	0	—		3 (Note: Appearance(s) in Copa Santa Catarina)	0	10	0
Chapecoense	2024	Série B	0	0	—		0	0	—		—		24	0
Chapecoense	2025	Série B	0	0	9	0	0	0	—		—		9	0
Chapecoense	Total		27	0	23	0	1	0	0	0	3	0	54	0
Santo André (loan)	2024	Série D	0	0	0	0	—		—		—		0	0
Portuguesa	2025	Série D	0	0	—		—		—		—		0	0
Portuguesa	2026	Série D	1	0	0	0	0	0	—		—		1	0
Portuguesa	Total		1	0	0	0	0	0	—		—		1	0
Career total			28	0	23	0	1	0	0	0	3	0	55	0
