= Igor Torres =

Brazilian footballer (born 2000)

Personal information
- Full name: Igor Torres da Silva
- Date of birth: 11 March 2000 (age 26)
- Place of birth: São Paulo, Brazil
- Height: 1.83 m (6 ft 0 in)
- Positions: Forward; winger

Team information
- Current team: Portuguesa
- Number: 13

Youth career
- Santarritense
- Atlético Goianiense
- Taboão da Serra
- 2020: → Fortaleza (loan)

Senior career*
Years	Team	Apps	(Gls)
2020–2021	Taboão da Serra	0	(0)
2020–2021	→ Fortaleza (loan)	7	(1)
2021–2025	Fortaleza	23	(3)
2022	→ Bahia (loan)	8	(1)
2023	→ Atlético Goianiense (loan)	9	(2)
2023	→ Ponte Preta (loan)	15	(0)
2024	→ Aparecidense (loan)	14	(7)
2024	→ Vila Nova (loan)	5	(0)
2024	→ Aparecidense (loan)	12	(3)
2024–2025	→ Al-Khaldiya (loan)	9	(3)
2025–	Portuguesa	36	(5)
2025	→ Caxias (loan)	6	(0)
- * Club domestic league appearances and goals as of 14:30, 3 August 2026 (UTC)

Igor Torres da Silva (born 11 March 2000), known as Igor Torres, is a Brazilian professional footballer who plays as either a forward or a winger for Caxias, on loan from Portuguesa.

== Career ==
Born in São Paulo, Igor Torres played futsal for São Paulo FC before representing Santarritense, Atlético Goianiense and Taboão da Serra as a youth. In February 2020, after impressing with the latter in the year's Copa São Paulo de Futebol Júnior, he was loaned to Fortaleza and was assigned to their under-20 squad.

In October 2020, Igor Torres was promoted to the first team by head coach Rogério Ceni, and made his senior – and Série A – debut on 19 November, coming on as a late substitute for Marlon in a 0–0 away draw against Vasco da Gama. He scored his first goal the following 10 February, netting the opener in a 3–0 home success over the same opponent.

On 26 February 2021, Igor Torres signed a permanent deal with Fortaleza until 2024, after having 75% of his economic rights bought by the club. He was mainly a backup option in the season, and was loaned to Série B side Bahia on 18 July 2022.

On 3 January 2023, Igor Torres returned to his former club Atlético Goianiense, on loan for the season. On 6 July, he moved to fellow second division side Ponte Preta also in a temporary deal.

On 16 January 2024, Igor Torres agreed to a one-year loan deal with Aparecidense. On 8 April, after being the club's top scorer in the Campeonato Goiano, he moved to Vila Nova, but returned to Aparecidense on 7 June, after just five matches.

On 13 September 2024, Igor Torres moved abroad for the first time in his career, after being loaned out to Al-Khaldiya in the Bahraini Premier League. The following 6 February, he returned to his home country after being announced at Portuguesa on a permanent deal.

On 22 August 2025, after being eliminated from the Série D, Igor Torres was loaned to Caxias until the end of the season.

== Career statistics ==
As of 3 August 2026

Club	Season	League			State League		Cup		Continental		Other		Total	
Club	Season	Division	Apps	Goals	Apps	Goals	Apps	Goals	Apps	Goals	Apps	Goals	Apps	Goals
Fortaleza	2020	Série A	7	1	0	0	1	0	—		—		8	1
Fortaleza	2021	Série A	16	3	3	0	3	0	—		3 (Note: Appearance(s) in Copa do Nordeste)	0	25	3
Fortaleza	2022	Série A	4	0	0	0	0	0	2 (Note: Appearance(s) in Copa Libertadores)	0	6	1	12	1
Fortaleza	Total		27	4	3	0	4	0	2	0	9	1	45	5
Bahia (loan)	2022	Série B	8	1	—		—		—		—		8	1
Atlético Goianiense (loan)	2023	Série B	5	0	4	2	2	0	—		—		11	2
Ponte Preta (loan)	2023	Série B	15	0	—		—		—		—		15	0
Aparecidense (loan)	2024	Série C	12	3	14	7	1	0	—		—		27	10
Vila Nova (loan)	2024	Série B	5	0	—		—		—		—		5	0
Al-Khaldiya (loan)	2024–25	Bahraini Premier League	9	3	—		0	0	6 (Note: Appearance(s) in AFC Champions League)	0	1 (Note: Appearance(s) in Bahraini Super Cup)	0	16	3
Portuguesa	2025	Série D	14	1	3	0	1	0	—		—		18	1
Portuguesa	2026	Série D	14	4	5	0	3	3	—		—		22	7
Portuguesa	Total		28	5	8	0	4	3	—		—		40	8
Caxias (loan)	2025	Série C	6	0	—		—		—		—		6	0
Career total			115	16	29	9	11	3	8	0	10	1	173	29

== Honours ==
Fortaleza

- Campeonato Cearense: 2020, 2021, 2022
- Copa do Nordeste: 2022
