= Everton Maceió =

Brazilian footballer

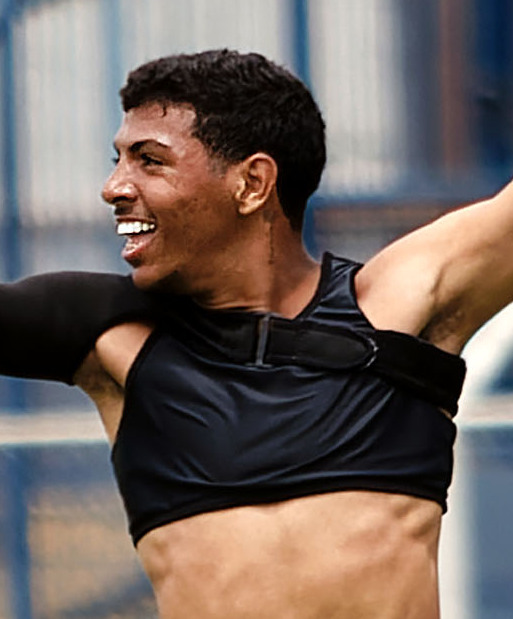
- Maceió celebrating a goal with São Caetano in 2023

Personal information
- Full name: Everton Leandro de Oliveira Santos
- Date of birth: 14 July 2003 (age 23)
- Place of birth: Maceió, Brazil
- Height: 1.77 m (5 ft 10 in)
- Position: Winger

Team information
- Current team: Kyoto Sanga (on loan from Portuguesa)

Youth career
- CSA
- CRB
- 2020–2021: → Grêmio (loan)
- 2022–2024: São Caetano
- 2023–2024: → Portuguesa (loan)

Senior career*
Years	Team	Apps	(Gls)
2022–2024	São Caetano	6	(1)
2024	→ Portuguesa (loan)	9	(1)
2024–	Portuguesa	29	(7)
2025	→ Mirassol (loan)	6	(0)
2026–	→ Kyoto Sanga (loan)	0	(0)
- * Club domestic league appearances and goals as of 22:29, 31 May 2026 (UTC)

Everton Leandro de Oliveira Santos (born 14 July 2003), known as Everton Maceió or just Maceió, is a Brazilian footballer who plays as a winger for J1 League club Kyoto Sanga, on loan from Portuguesa.

== Career ==
=== Early career ===
Nicknamed after his hometown, Maceió played for the youth sides of local CSA and CRB before joining Grêmio in February 2020, on loan. Back to CRB in late 2021, he moved to São Caetano in 2022.

=== São Caetano ===
A regular starter in the under-20 squad of the Azulão, Maceió signed his first professional contract with the club on 24 June 2022. He made his senior debut on 17 July, coming on as a late substitute in a 1–0 away win over Juventus-SP, for the year's Copa Paulista.

Maceió was definitely promoted to the main squad of São Caetano in January 2023, and scored his first senior goal on 4 March, netting the equalizer in a 3–1 Campeonato Paulista Série A2 home loss to Oeste.

=== Portuguesa ===
In September 2023, as the club's financial crisis worsened, Maceió moved to Portuguesa on loan and was assigned back to the under-20s. He made his first team debut with Lusa on 21 January 2024, replacing Victor Andrade late into a 3–2 Campeonato Paulista away win over Inter de Limeira.

Maceió scored his first goal for the club on 2 March 2024, netting the winner in a 1–0 home success over Mirassol which ensured Portuguesa's permanence in the Paulistão and also qualified them to the 2025 Campeonato Brasileiro Série D. In September, he agreed to a permanent deal with Portuguesa until 2027.

==== Loan to Mirassol ====
On 19 March 2025, Série A newcomers Mirassol announced the signing of Maceió on loan until the end of the year. He made his top tier debut ten days later, starting in a 2–1 away loss to Cruzeiro.

On 3 December 2025, after just six matches, Maceió's loan was cut short.

==== Loan to Kyoto Sanga ====
Back to Lusa for the 2026 Campeonato Paulista, Maceió was an undisputed starter, and moved to J1 League club Kyoto Sanga on a one-year loan deal on 8 July 2026.

== Career statistics ==
As of 31 May 2026

Club	Season	League			State League		Cup		Continental		Other		Total	
Club	Season	Division	Apps	Goals	Apps	Goals	Apps	Goals	Apps	Goals	Apps	Goals	Apps	Goals
São Caetano	2022	Paulista A2	—		0	0	—		—		9 (Note: Appearance(s) in Copa Paulista)	0	9	0
São Caetano	2023	Paulista A2	—		6	1	—		—		8	0	14	1
São Caetano	Total		—		6	1	—		—		17	0	23	1
Portuguesa	2024	Paulista	—		9	1	—		—		15	7	24	8
Portuguesa	2025	Série D	0	0	11	3	1	0	—		—		12	3
Portuguesa	2026	Série D	9	1	9	3	3	1	—		—		21	5
Portuguesa	Total		9	1	29	7	4	1	—		15	7	57	16
Mirassol (loan)	2025	Série A	6	0	—		—		—		—		6	0
Career total			15	1	35	8	4	1	0	0	32	7	86	17
