= Gustavo Henrique (footballer, born October 1999) =

Brazilian footballer

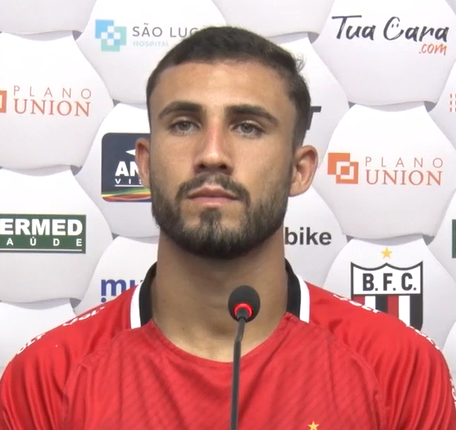
- Gustavo Henrique in 2022

Personal information
- Full name: Gustavo Henrique Santos
- Date of birth: 17 October 1999 (age 27)
- Place of birth: Fernando Prestes, Brazil
- Height: 1.92 m (6 ft 4 in)
- Position: Centre-back

Team information
- Current team: Portuguesa
- Number: 3

Youth career
- 2018: Capivariano
- 2018–2019: São-Carlense
- 2019: Itapirense
- 2019–2020: Atlético Mineiro

Senior career*
Years	Team	Apps	(Gls)
2019	São-Carlense	5	(0)
2020–2021	Atlético Mineiro	1	(0)
2021	→ Bahia (loan)	16	(1)
2022–2023	Bahia	4	(0)
2022–2023	→ Botafogo-SP (loan)	21	(1)
2023	→ Sampaio Corrêa (loan)	29	(0)
2024–2025	CRB	24	(1)
2025	→ Portuguesa (loan)	9	(0)
2025–	Portuguesa	28	(0)
2025	→ Caxias (loan)	4	(0)
2026	→ Paysandu (loan)	3	(0)
- * Club domestic league appearances and goals as of 9 November 2026

Gustavo Henrique Santos (born 17 October 1999), known as Gustavo Henrique, is a Brazilian professional footballer who plays as a centre-back for Portuguesa.

== Career ==
Born in Fernando Prestes, São Paulo, Gustavo Henrique had failed trials at São Paulo, Jabaquara, Novorizontino and Guarani before applying to a college in the United States in late 2016. After passing the test for a four-year college period in October 2017, he was later unable to gain a visa and briefly focused on his studies before deciding to return to football in June 2018.

Back to football, Gustavo Henrique played for Capivariano for a brief period before joining São-Carlense. At the latter club, he made his senior debut in the 2019 Campeonato Paulista Segunda Divisão, before moving to Itapirense and being assigned to the under-20 squad.

In November 2019, Gustavo Henrique signed for Atlético Mineiro, being initially a member of the under-20 team. He was moved to the under-23 squad for the 2020 season, and signed his first professional contract with the club on 1 October, after agreeing to a two-year deal. He made his professional debut with Galo on 26 November 2020, coming on as a late substitute for Eduardo Sasha in a 2–1 Série A home win over Botafogo.

On 21 January 2021, Bahia announced the signing of Gustavo Henrique on loan for the entire season. On 20 October, he agreed to a permanent three-year contract with the club, effective as of the following January.

On 11 April 2022, after featuring rarely for Bahia, Gustavo Henrique was loaned to Botafogo-SP for one year. He helped in the club's promotion to the Série B, but left on 14 March 2023.

On 13 April 2023, Gustavo Henrique was announced at Sampaio Corrêa also on loan. A regular starter as the club suffered relegation, he moved to CRB on 20 December.

On 12 December 2024, Gustavo Henrique was announced on loan at Portuguesa. The following 25 March, after being a starter, he signed a permanent deal with Lusa until 2028.

On 28 August 2025, Gustavo Henrique was loaned to Caxias in the third division, until the end of the season. Back to Portuguesa for the 2026 season, he was regularly used before being again loaned out to Paysandu on 21 August of that year.

== Personal life ==
Gustavo Henrique's younger brother Guilherme died in a car accident in July 2023.

== Career statistics ==
As of 17 November 2026

Club	Season	League			State League		Cup		Continental		Other		Total	
Club	Season	Division	Apps	Goals	Apps	Goals	Apps	Goals	Apps	Goals	Apps	Goals	Apps	Goals
São-Carlense	2019	Paulista 2ª Divisão	—		5	0	—		—		—		5	0
Atlético Mineiro	2020	Série A	1	0	0	0	0	0	—		—		1	0
Bahia	2021	Série A	6	0	10	1	0	0	0	0	1 (Note: Appearance(s) in Copa do Nordeste)	0	17	1
Bahia	2022	Série B	0	0	4	0	0	0	—		1	0	5	0
Bahia	Total		6	0	14	1	0	0	0	0	2	0	22	1
Botafogo-SP (loan)	2022	Série C	13	1	—		—		—		8 (Note: Appearance(s) in Copa Paulista)	2	21	3
Botafogo-SP (loan)	2023	Série B	0	0	8	0	2	0	—		—		10	0
Botafogo-SP (loan)	Total		13	1	8	0	2	0	—		8	2	31	3
Sampaio Corrêa (loan)	2023	Série B	29	0	—		—		—		—		29	0
CRB	2024	Série B	20	0	4	1	3	0	—		2	0	29	1
Portuguesa	2025	Série D	15	0	9	0	1	0	—		—		25	0
Portuguesa	2026	Série D	5	0	8	0	3	0	—		—		16	0
Portuguesa	Total		20	0	17	0	4	0	—		—		41	3
Caxias (loan)	2025	Série C	4	0	—		—		—		—		4	0
Paysandu (loan)	2026	Série C	3	0	—		—		—		—		3	0
Career total			96	1	47	2	9	0	0	0	12	2	164	5
