= Gustavo Sciencia =

Brazilian footballer

Personal information
- Full name: Gustavo Sciencia Paula Silva
- Date of birth: 1 January 2004 (age 22)
- Place of birth: São Bernardo do Campo, Brazil
- Height: 1.76 m (5 ft 9 in)
- Position: Right-back

Team information
- Current team: Portuguesa
- Number: 42

Youth career
- 2015–2016: Portuguesa
- 2017–2018: Corinthians
- 2019: Nacional-SP
- 2020–2023: Ibrachina
- 2021–2022: → Palmeiras (loan)
- 2022–2023: → Ceará (loan)
- 2024–2025: Portuguesa

Senior career*
Years	Team	Apps	(Gls)
2024–	Portuguesa	18	(1)
- * Club domestic league appearances and goals as of 20:56, 22 July 2026 (UTC)

Gustavo Sciencia Paula Silva (born 1 January 2004), known as Gustavo Sciencia or just Sciencia, is a Brazilian footballer who plays as a right-back for Portuguesa.

== Career ==
Born in São Bernardo do Campo, São Paulo, Sciencia began his career with Portuguesa, and subsequently represented Corinthians, Nacional-SP and Ibrachina before agreeing to a loan deal at Palmeiras in August 2021. On 14 January 2022, after impressing with the under-17 team, his loan was renewed for a further year.

In August 2022, after featuring rarely for the under-20 side of Verdão, Sciencia joined Ceará also on loan. Back to Ibrachina in 2023, he returned to his first club Portuguesa in December of that year.

In May 2024, Sciencia was promoted to the first team of Lusa for the 2024 Copa Paulista, making his senior debut on 15 June of that year by coming on as a second-half substitute for Gustavo Talles in a 1–1 away draw against Juventus. Initially a backup option, he became a starter after Talles left, but lost the starting spot after the arrival of Thomas Ben-Hur.

Back to the under-20s for the 2025 Copa São Paulo de Futebol Júnior, Sciencia returned to the first team shortly after. Mainly a backup option, he scored his first professional goal on 6 June 2026, netting his team's second through a free kick in a 2–0 Série D home win over Portuguesa-RJ.

== Career statistics ==
As of 22 July 2026

Club	Season	League			State League		Cup		Continental		Other		Total	
Club	Season	Division	Apps	Goals	Apps	Goals	Apps	Goals	Apps	Goals	Apps	Goals	Apps	Goals
Portuguesa	2024	Paulista	—		—		—		—		6 (Note: Appearance(s) in Copa Paulista)	0	6	0
Portuguesa	2025	Série D	6	0	0	0	0	0	—		—		6	0
Portuguesa	2026	Série D	8	1	4	0	1	0	—		—		13	1
Career total			14	1	4	0	1	0	0	0	6	0	25	1
