= Thiaguinho (footballer, born 1997) =

Brazilian footballer

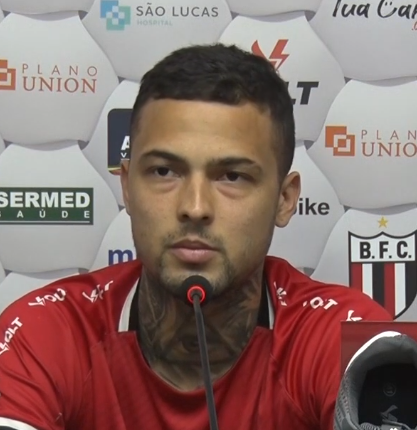
- Thiaguinho in 2022

Personal information
- Full name: Thiago Beserra dos Santos
- Date of birth: 11 April 1997 (age 29)
- Place of birth: Suzano, Brazil
- Height: 1.80 m (5 ft 11 in)
- Position: Defensive midfielder

Youth career
- 2013: São Vicente
- 2014: ECUS
- 2015: Guaratinguetá
- 2016–2017: Juventus-SP

Senior career*
Years	Team	Apps	(Gls)
2016–2017	Juventus-SP	0	(0)
2017	→ Nacional-SP (loan)	0	(0)
2018–2019	Nacional-SP	15	(5)
2018–2019	→ Corinthians (loan)	11	(0)
2019–2023	Corinthians	0	(0)
2019	→ Oeste (loan)	28	(3)
2020	→ Botafogo (loan)	7	(0)
2020	→ CRB (loan)	13	(0)
2021	→ Inter de Limeira (loan)	11	(0)
2022	→ Santo André (loan)	10	(0)
2022	→ Botafogo-SP (loan)	19	(1)
2023–2024	Água Santa	22	(1)
2023	→ Ituano (loan)	19	(0)
2024	Juventude	9	(0)
2025	Vitória	3	(1)
2025	Operário Ferroviário	14	(0)
2026	Portuguesa	13	(0)
- * Club domestic league appearances and goals as of 14:29, 3 August 2026 (UTC)

Thiago Beserra dos Santos (born 11 April 1997), commonly known as Thiaguinho, is a Brazilian footballer. Mainly a defensive midfielder, he can also play as a right-back.

== Career ==
=== Early career ===
Born in Suzano, São Paulo, Thiaguinho played for several youth sides before making his senior debut with Juventus-SP in the 2016 Copa Paulista. Rarely used afterwards, he moved to Nacional-SP on loan in 2017, signing a permanent deal in the following year.

=== Corinthians ===
On 24 April 2018, after impressing in the year's Campeonato Paulista Série A2 for Nacional, Thiaguinho and teammate Bruno Xavier were announced at Corinthians on loan until May of the following year. He made his official club – and Série A – debut on 4 August, starting in a 0–0 home draw against Atlético Paranaense.

After managing to feature regularly in the last matches of the year, Thiaguinho was rarely used in the following campaign, but still signed a permanent deal with Timão until 2022 on 3 April 2019.

==== Loans ====
On 6 May 2019, Thiaguinho was loaned to Série B side Oeste until the end of the year. Regularly used, he moved to Botafogo in the top tier on 27 December, also on loan, but had his loan cut short on 3 March 2020.

On 20 March 2020, Thiaguinho was announced at CRB also on loan from Corinthians. At his new side, he was also a backup option, and moved to Inter de Limeira also in a temporary deal on 4 January 2021.

Regularly used during the entire 2021 Campeonato Paulista, Thiaguinho returned to Corinthians afterwards, but only featured in the under-23 squad. On 9 January 2022, he joined Santo André also in a temporary deal.

On 12 April 2022, still owned by Timão, Thiaguinho signed for Botafogo-SP until the end of the year. He was regularly used for the side, albeit mainly as a substitute.

=== Água Santa ===
On 6 January 2023, Água Santa announced the signing of Thiaguinho. A first-choice during most of the 2023 Campeonato Paulista, he helped his side to reach the finals for the first time ever, but lost the finals to Palmeiras on aggregate.

==== Loan to Ituano ====
On 11 April 2023, Thiaguinho was announced at Ituano on loan until the end of the year. He only featured in 18 matches as the club avoided relegation.

=== Juventude ===
On 12 April 2024, after another spell back at Água Santa, Thiaguinho signed for Juventude in the top tier until the end of the year. He struggled with injuries at the side, and only managed to appear in nine matches overall.

=== Vitória ===
On 4 January 2025, Thiaguinho was announced at Vitória on a one-year contract, reuniting with head coach Thiago Carpini for the third time in his career. However, he only played in six matches before departing the club by mutual consent on 23 May.

=== Operário Ferroviário ===
Shortly after leaving Vitória, Operário Ferroviário announced a pre-contract with Thiaguinho, effective as of July. Unable to establish himself as a regular starter, he left the club in November.

=== Portuguesa ===
On 5 March 2026, after nearly four months without a club, Thiaguinho signed a deal with Série D side Portuguesa until the end of the year.

== Career statistics ==
As of 3 August 2026

Club	Season	League			State League		Cup		Continental		Other		Total	
Club	Season	Division	Apps	Goals	Apps	Goals	Apps	Goals	Apps	Goals	Apps	Goals	Apps	Goals
Juventus-SP	2016	Paulista A2	—		0	0	—		—		9 (Note: Appearance(s) in Copa Paulista)	0	9	0
Nacional-SP	2017	Paulista A3	—		—		—		—		9	2	9	2
Nacional-SP	2018	Paulista A2	—		15	5	—		—		—		15	5
Nacional-SP	Total		—		15	5	—		—		9	0	24	5
Corinthians	2018	Série A	9	0	—		0	0	—		—		9	0
Corinthians	2019	Série A	0	0	2	0	0	0	0	0	—		2	0
Corinthians	Total		9	0	2	0	0	0	0	0	—		11	0
Oeste (loan)	2019	Série B	28	3	—		—		—		—		28	3
Botafogo (loan)	2020	Série A	0	0	5	0	2	0	—		—		7	0
CRB (loan)	2020	Série B	13	0	4	0	—		—		0	0	17	0
Inter de Limeira (loan)	2021	Série D	—		11	0	—		—		—		11	0
Santo André (loan)	2022	Série D	—		10	0	—		—		—		10	0
Botafogo-SP (loan)	2022	Série C	19	1	—		—		—		6	0	25	1
Água Santa	2023	Paulista	—		14	0	—		—		—		14	0
Água Santa	2024	Série D	—		8	1	—		—		—		8	1
Água Santa	Total		—		22	1	—		—		—		22	1
Ituano (loan)	2023	Série B	18	0	—		1	0	—		—		19	0
Juventude	2024	Série A	7	0	—		2	0	—		—		9	0
Vitória	2025	Série A	0	0	3	1	0	0	0	0	3 (Note: Appearance(s) in Copa do Nordeste)	0	6	1
Operário Ferroviário	2025	Série B	14	0	—		—		—		—		14	0
Portuguesa	2026	Série D	13	0	—		1	0	—		—		14	0
Career total			121	4	72	7	6	0	0	0	27	2	226	13

== Honours ==
Corinthians

- Campeonato Paulista: 2019

CRB

- Campeonato Alagoano: 2020
