= Keven Coloni =

Brazilian footballer

Personal information
- Full name: Keven Fernando Novaes Coloni Policarpo
- Date of birth: 14 April 2005 (age 21)
- Place of birth: Araraquara, Brazil
- Height: 1.77 m (5 ft 10 in)
- Position: Forward

Team information
- Current team: Boavista

Youth career
- 2017–2021: Palmeiras
- 2022: Cruzeiro
- 2022–2023: Atlético Goianiense
- 2023–2024: Athletico Paranaense
- 2024: Azuriz
- 2024: → Vila Nova (loan)
- 2025: Portuguesa

Senior career*
Years	Team	Apps	(Gls)
2023	Atlético Goianiense	0	(0)
2023	→ Inhumas (loan)	2	(0)
2025–2026	Portuguesa	5	(0)
2026–	Boavista	0	(0)
- * Club domestic league appearances and goals as of 05:33, 29 January 2026 (UTC)

Keven Fernando Novaes Coloni Policarpo (born 14 April 2005), known as Keven Coloni or just Keven, is a Brazilian footballer who plays as a forward for Boavista.

== Career ==
=== Early career ===
Born in Araraquara, São Paulo, Keven played for the youth sides of Palmeiras before moving to Cruzeiro in January 2022. He subsequently moved to Atlético Goianiense later in that year, before being loaned out to Inhumas in January 2023, for the year's Campeonato Goiano.

Keven made his senior debut on 4 February 2023, coming on as a second-half substitute in a 3–1 away loss to Iporá, and featured in one further match for the side before returning to Atlético in March. In July, however, he signed for Athletico Paranaense, but left for Azuriz in the following year.

In September 2024, Keven was loaned to Vila Nova, also for the under-20 team.

=== Portuguesa ===
Ahead of the 2025 season, Keven signed for Portuguesa and was initially a member of the under-20s. After impressing with the side, he made his debut with the main squad on 12 July, replacing Marcelo Freitas late into a 2–1 Série D home win over Água Santa.

On 1 October 2025, Keven renewed his contract with Lusa for a further year. Rarely used in the following season, he was transfer listed by the club in June 2026.

=== Boavista ===
On 8 July 2026, Keven was announced at Boavista on a contract until March of the following year. He scored his first senior goal on 22 July, netting his side's fourth in a 4–0 Copa Rio home routing of Araruama.

== Career statistics ==
As of 3 August 2026

Club	Season	League			State League		Cup		Continental		Other		Total	
Club	Season	Division	Apps	Goals	Apps	Goals	Apps	Goals	Apps	Goals	Apps	Goals	Apps	Goals
Inhumas	2023	Goiano	—		2	0	—		—		—		2	0
Portuguesa	2025	Série D	3	0	—		—		—		—		3	0
Portuguesa	2026	Série D	0	0	2	0	0	0	—		—		2	0
Portuguesa	Total		3	0	2	0	0	0	—		—		5	0
Boavista	2026	Série D	—		—		—		—		2 (Note: Appearance(s) in Copa Rio)	1	2	1
Career total			3	0	4	0	0	0	0	0	2	1	9	1
