= João Vitor (footballer, born 2002) =

Brazilian footballer

Personal information
- Full name: João Vitor Cardoso de Souza
- Date of birth: 25 July 2002 (age 24)
- Place of birth: Goiânia, Brazil
- Height: 1.74 m (5 ft 9 in)
- Position: Right-back

Team information
- Current team: Portuguesa
- Number: 2

Youth career
- 2017–2019: Goiânia
- 2019–2021: Fluminense

Senior career*
Years	Team	Apps	(Gls)
2019	Goiânia	2	(0)
2022–2025	Monsoon	25	(0)
2024	→ São Luiz (loan)	11	(0)
2024	→ Juventude (loan)	0	(0)
2025	→ Londrina (loan)	35	(0)
2026–	Portuguesa	24	(0)
2026	→ Avaí (loan)	14	(0)
- * Club domestic league appearances and goals as of 20:11, 17 November 2026 (UTC)

João Vitor Cardoso de Souza (born 25 July 2002), known as João Vitor, is a Brazilian footballer who plays as a right-back for Avaí, on loan from Portuguesa.

== Career ==
Born in Goiânia, Goiás, João Vitor was a Goiânia EC youth graduate, and made his senior debut at the age of 16 on 20 March 2019, starting in a 2–1 Campeonato Goiano away loss to Anapolina. In May, after one further first-team appearance, he joined Fluminense and was assigned to the under-17 squad.

In 2022, after being rarely used in the under-20 team, João Vitor moved to Monsoon. On 13 November 2023, after two seasons as a starter, he was loaned to São Luiz.

A regular starter for São Luiz, João Vitor joined Série A side Juventude on 9 April 2024, on loan for one year. He would only feature for a "B-team" in the Copa FGF, however, and moved to Londrina on 8 January 2025.

A regular starter for LEC as the club achieved promotion to the second division, João Vitor was announced at Portuguesa on a permanent two-year deal on 5 December 2025. On 9 August of the following year, he was loaned to Avaí in the Série B.

== Career statistics ==
As of 17 November 2026

Club	Season	League			State League		Cup		Continental		Other		Total	
Club	Season	Division	Apps	Goals	Apps	Goals	Apps	Goals	Apps	Goals	Apps	Goals	Apps	Goals
Goiânia	2019	Goiano	—		2	0	—		—		—		2	0
Monsoon	2022	Gaúcho Série B	—		10	0	—		—		6 (Note: Appearance(s) in Copa FGF)	1	16	1
Monsoon	2023	Gaúcho Série A2	—		15	0	—		—		9	0	24	0
Monsoon	Total		—		25	0	—		—		15	1	40	1
São Luiz (loan)	2024	Gauchão	—		11	0	1	0	—		1 (Note: Appearance(s) in Recopa Gaúcha)	0	13	0
Juventude (loan)	2024	Série A	0	0	—		—		—		10	1	10	1
Londrina	2025	Série C	21	0	14	0	—		—		—		35	0
Portuguesa	2026	Série D	15	0	9	0	3	0	—		—		27	0
Avaí (loan)	2026	Série B	14	0	—		—		—		—		14	0
Career total			50	0	61	0	4	0	0	0	26	2	141	2

== Honours ==
Monsoon

- Campeonato Gaúcho Série B: 2022

São Luiz

- Recopa Gaúcha: 2024

Individual

- Campeonato Paulista Team of the Year: 2026
