= Guilherme Santos (footballer, born 2001) =

Brazilian footballer

Personal information
- Full name: Guilherme Santos da Silva
- Date of birth: 13 May 2001 (age 25)
- Place of birth: Serra, Brazil
- Height: 1.82 m (6 ft 0 in)
- Position: Winger

Team information
- Current team: ABC

Youth career
- 2011–2015: Grêmio Laranjeiras
- 2015–2016: Rio Branco-ES
- 2016–2017: Porto Vitória
- 2017–2020: Atlético Mineiro

Senior career*
Years	Team	Apps	(Gls)
2020–2024	Atlético Mineiro	0	(0)
2020	→ Coimbra (loan)	1	(1)
2021	→ Coimbra (loan)	4	(0)
2021	→ Vitória (loan)	14	(0)
2022	→ Red Bull Brasil (loan)	12	(6)
2022	→ Red Bull Bragantino (loan)	2	(0)
2023	→ Avaí (loan)	1	(0)
2024	→ Villa Nova (loan)	7	(2)
2024	→ FC Cincinnati 2 (loan)	12	(3)
2025–2026	Botafogo-PB	30	(7)
2025	→ Avaí (loan)	6	(0)
2026	Portuguesa	12	(0)
2026	→ São José-SP (loan)	0	(0)
2027–	ABC	0	(0)
- * Club domestic league appearances and goals as of 14:43, 3 August 2026 (UTC)

Guilherme Santos da Silva (born 13 May 2001), known as Guilherme Santos, is a Brazilian professional footballer who plays as a winger for ABC.

== Football career ==
Born in Serra, Espírito Santo, Guilherme Santos played for the youth categories of local sides Grêmio Laranjeiras, Rio Branco-ES, and Porto Vitória before signing with Atlético Mineiro in 2017. In July 2020, he was loaned to Coimbra for the remaining stages of the 2020 Campeonato Mineiro, and made his senior debut in a 2–1 Campeonato Mineiro loss to Tombense on 27 July, starting the match and scoring his side's only goal.

Back to Galo after only that appearance, Guilherme Santos renewed his contract with the club until 2023 on 12 November 2020, but returned to Coimbra again on loan the following 11 March. After again featuring rarely, he returned to his parent club in April 2021, but was announced at Vitória also in a temporary deal on 8 May of that year.

On 27 January 2022, Guilherme Santos was loaned to Red Bull Bragantino, being initially a member of reserve team Red Bull Brasil. After being the top scorer of the Campeonato Paulista Série A2, he was promoted to the main squad in March, and made his Série A debut on 17 October, coming on as a second-half substitute for Helinho in a 2–0 home loss to Santos.

On 10 January 2023, still owned by Atlético, Guilherme Santos joined Avaí until the end of the year. Rarely used, he moved to Villa Nova roughly one year later, on loan for the 2024 Campeonato Mineiro.

On 16 May 2024, FC Cincinnati 2 announced the signing of Guilherme Santos on a MLS Next Pro contract, although his rights were still linked to Atlético Mineiro. In December, he returned to his home country after signing a permanent deal with Botafogo-PB, where he soon became a key unit under head coach João Burse.

On 18 July 2025, Guilherme Santos returned to Avaí, again on loan. Back to Belo in October after just six matches, but was unable to repeat the same success in the 2026 season, and departed the club on 12 March of that year.

On 20 March 2026, Portuguesa announced the signing of Guilherme Santos until the end of 2027. On 28 August, however, he joined São José-SP on loan for the Copa Paulista knockout rounds.

On 28 October 2026, after helping the Águia do Vale to win their first-ever cup title, Guilherme Santos was announced at ABC for the ensuing campaign.

== Career statistics ==
As of 20 October 2026

Club	Season	League			State League		Cup		Continental		Other		Total	
Club	Season	Division	Apps	Goals	Apps	Goals	Apps	Goals	Apps	Goals	Apps	Goals	Apps	Goals
Coimbra	2020	Mineiro	—		1	1	—		—		—		1	1
Coimbra	2021	Mineiro	—		4	0	—		—		—		4	0
Vitória	2021	Série B	14	0	—		4	1	—		—		18	1
Red Bull Brasil	2022	Paulista A2	—		12	6	—		—		—		12	6
Red Bull Bragantino	2022	Série A	2	0	—		0	0	—		—		2	0
Avaí	2023	Série B	0	0	1	0	0	0	—		9 (Note: Appearance(s) in Copa Santa Catarina)	1	10	1
Villa Nova	2024	Mineiro	—		7	2	2	0	—		—		9	2
FC Cincinnati 2	2024	MLS Next Pro	12	2	—		—		—		—		12	2
Botafogo-PB	2025	Série C	9	1	12	4	4	1	—		0	0	25	6
Botafogo-PB	2026	Série C	0	0	9	2	1	0	—		—		10	2
Botafogo-PB	Total		9	1	21	6	5	1	—		0	0	35	8
Avaí (loan)	2025	Série B	6	0	—		—		—		—		6	0
Portuguesa	2026	Série D	12	0	—		—		—		—		12	0
São José-SP (loan)	2026	Paulista A2	—		—		—		—		6 (Note: Appearance(s) in Copa Paulista)	0	6	0
Career total			55	3	46	15	11	2	0	0	15	1	127	21

== Honours ==
São José-SP

- Copa Paulista: 2026
