= Marco (footballer, born 2000) =

Brazilian footballer (born 2000)

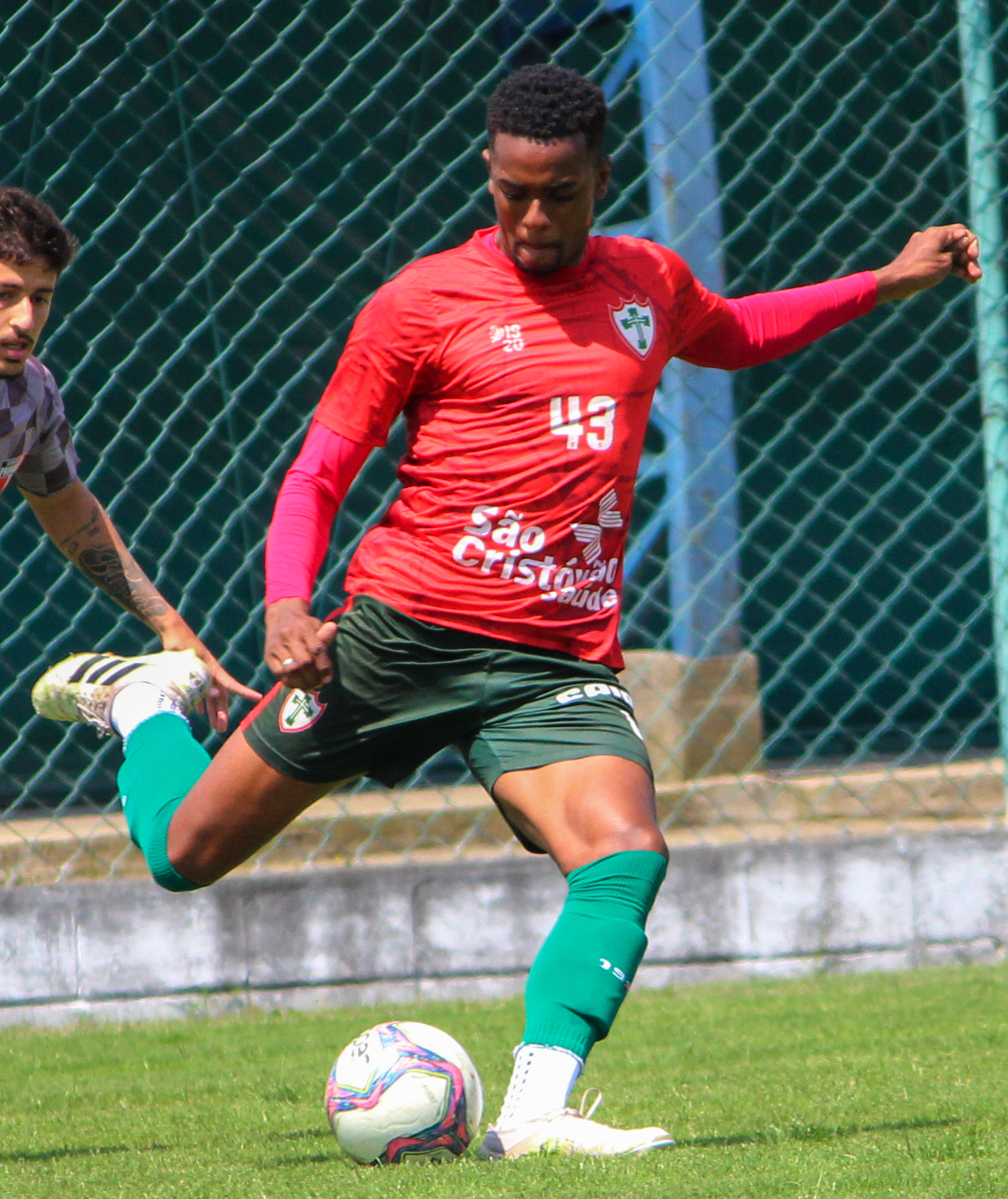
- Marco with Portuguesa in 2021

Personal information
- Full name: Marco Gabriel de Oliveira Santos
- Date of birth: 16 November 2000 (age 25)
- Place of birth: São Paulo, Brazil
- Height: 1.86 m (6 ft 1 in)
- Positions: Centre back; left back

Team information
- Current team: Sertãozinho

Youth career
- 2015: São José-SP
- 2016–2017: Osasco FC
- 2019–2020: Portuguesa

Senior career*
Years	Team	Apps	(Gls)
2020–2026	Portuguesa	8	(0)
2023–2024	→ Volta Redonda (loan)	15	(0)
2025	→ São Bento (loan)	0	(0)
2026	→ Sertãozinho (loan)	6	(1)
2026–	Sertãozinho	4	(0)
- * Club domestic league appearances and goals as of 13:57, 9 March 2026 (UTC)

Marco Gabriel de Oliveira Santos (born 16 November 2000), simply known as Marco, is a Brazilian footballer who plays as either a central defender or a left back for Sertãozinho.

== Career ==
Born in São Paulo, Marco joined Portuguesa's youth setup in 2019, after representing Osasco FC and São José-SP. He made his senior debut for the side on 25 November 2020, coming on as a second-half substitute for Maikinho in a 2–0 home win over Guarani, for the year's Copa Paulista.

Marco was promoted to the main squad for the 2021 season, and made his first appearance as a starter on 5 July 2021, providing an assist for Caíque's opener in a 2–0 Série D home win over São Bento; he was later praised by manager Fernando Marchiori. He was a backup option during the 2022 Campeonato Paulista Série A2, as his side achieved promotion as champions.

Marco scored his first senior goal on 10 September 2022, netting the winner in a 1–0 home success over Desportivo Brasil. On 26 December, he was loaned to Série C side Volta Redonda until the end of 2023; he also renewed his contract with Lusa until 2024.

On 30 November 2023, Marco's loan with Voltaço was renewed for a further year. Back to Portuguesa for the 2024 Copa Paulista, he suffered a knee injury in the latter stages of the competition, and renewed his contract until February 2026 on 22 March 2025.

On 19 May 2025, after fully recovering, Marco was loaned to São Bento for the Copa Paulista. On 19 December, he moved to Sertãozinho also in a temporary deal.

== Career statistics ==
As of 9 March 2026

Club	Season	League			State League		Cup		Continental		Other		Total	
Club	Season	Division	Apps	Goals	Apps	Goals	Apps	Goals	Apps	Goals	Apps	Goals	Apps	Goals
Portuguesa	2020	Paulista A2	—		—		—		—		1 (Note: Appearance(s) in Copa Paulista)	0	1	0
Portuguesa	2021	Série D	8	0	—		—		—		5	0	13	0
Portuguesa	2022	Paulista A2	—		0	0	—		—		8	1	8	1
Portuguesa	2024	Paulista	—		—		—		—		11	0	11	0
Portuguesa	Total		8	0	0	0	—		—		25	1	33	1
Volta Redonda (loan)	2023	Série C	6	0	7	0	3	0	—		2 (Note: Appearance(s) in Copa Rio)	0	18	0
Volta Redonda (loan)	2024	Série C	0	0	2	0	0	0	—		—		2	0
Volta Redonda (loan)	Total		6	0	9	0	3	0	—		2	0	20	0
São Bento (loan)	2025	Paulista A2	—		—		—		—		4	2	4	2
Sertãozinho	2026	Paulista A2	—		10	1	—		—		—		10	1
Career total			14	0	19	1	3	0	0	0	31	3	67	4

== Honours ==
Portuguesa

- Copa Paulista: 2020
- Campeonato Paulista Série A2: 2022
