= Hericlis =

Brazilian professional footballer

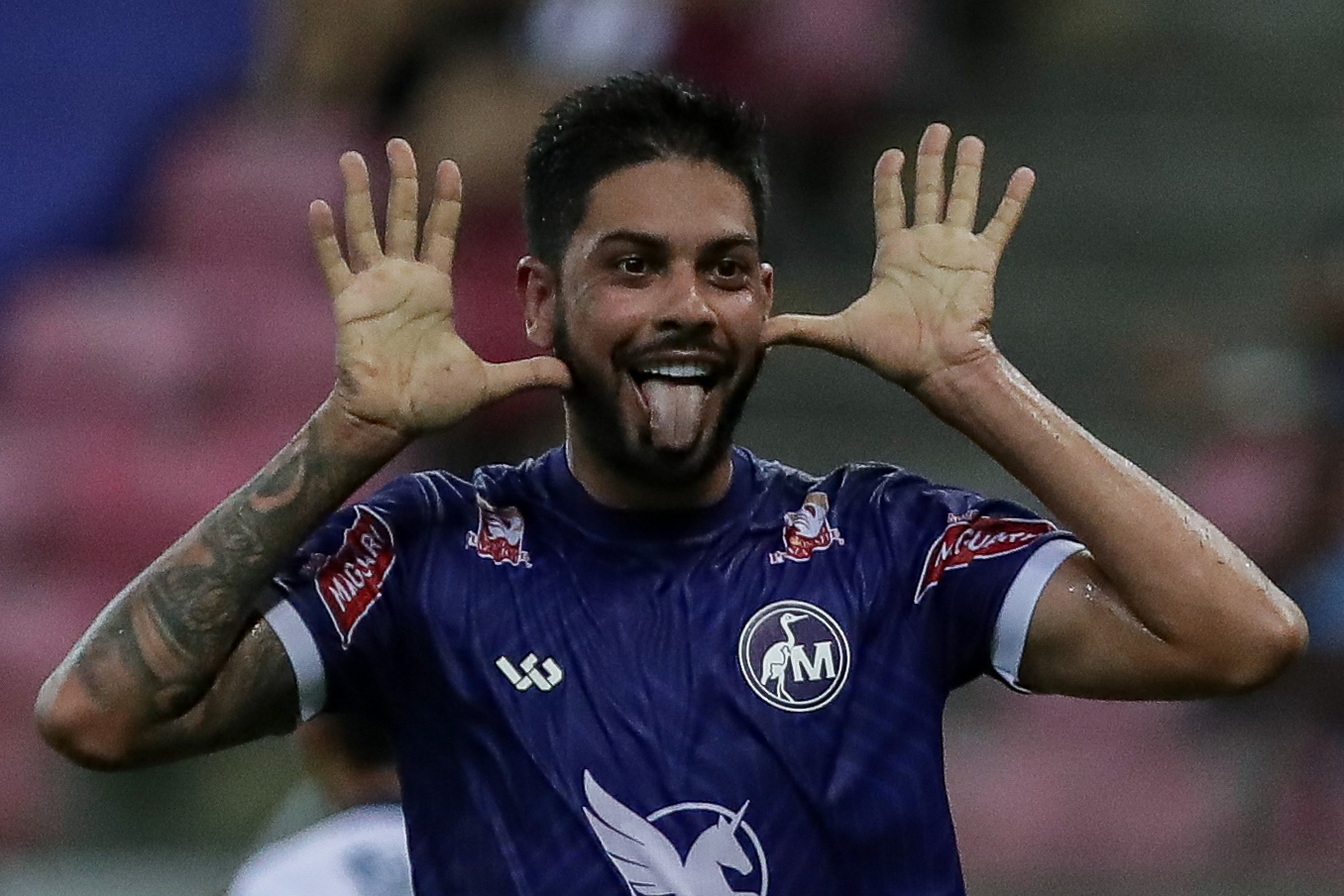
- Hericlis celebrating a goal for Maguary in 2025

Personal information
- Full name: Hericlis Lander de Sousa Costa
- Date of birth: 20 October 1995 (age 31)
- Place of birth: Pirenópolis, Brazil
- Height: 1.86 m (6 ft 1 in)
- Positions: Attacking midfielder; forward

Youth career
- Gama

Senior career*
Years	Team	Apps	(Gls)
2015–2016	Gama	33	(1)
2016	→ Remo (loan)	8	(0)
2017	Brasiliense	6	(0)
2017	Bragantino	0	(0)
2018–2019	Santa Cruz	8	(1)
2020–2021	Retrô	9	(3)
2020	→ ABC (loan)	2	(0)
2021	→ Salgueiro (loan)	6	(0)
2022	Grêmio Anápolis	3	(0)
2022	Ceilândia	8	(0)
2022	Itumbiara	10	(4)
2023	Nunawading City	5	(3)
2024	Maguary	8	(4)
2024	Cametá	9	(3)
2024–2025	América-PE	0	(0)
2024	→ Jaguar (loan)	2	(2)
2025	→ Maguary (loan)	7	(5)
2025–2026	Portuguesa	8	(1)
2025	→ América-PE (loan)	4	(0)
2026	→ Madureira (loan)	3	(0)
- * Club domestic league appearances and goals as of 13:50, 27 March 2026 (UTC)

Hericlis Lander de Sousa Costa (born 20 October 1995), simply known as Hericlis or sometimes spelled as Hericles, is a Brazilian professional footballer who plays as either an attacking midfielder or a forward.

== Career ==
Born in Pirenópolis, Goiás, Hericlis was a youth product of Gama before making his senior debut in 2015. On 13 May 2016, after impressing in the 2016 Copa Verde, he moved to Remo.

In November 2016, Hericlis joined Brasiliense, but failed to make an appearance before moving to Bragantino, where he also did not play. On 27 December 2017, he agreed to a deal with Santa Cruz.

Initially a starter, Hericlis subsequently struggled with injuries at Santa, and moved to Retrô on 3 January 2020. On 12 October, he was loaned to ABC until the end of the season.

On 22 February 2021, Hericlis was announced at Salgueiro. On 13 December, after a short spell back at Retrô, he joined Grêmio Anápolis, but also represented Ceilândia and Itumbiara during the 2022 season.

In July 2023, Hericlis moved abroad for the first time in his career and joined Australian National Premier Leagues Victoria 3 side Nunawading City. On 6 January 2024, he returned to his home country and joined Maguary.

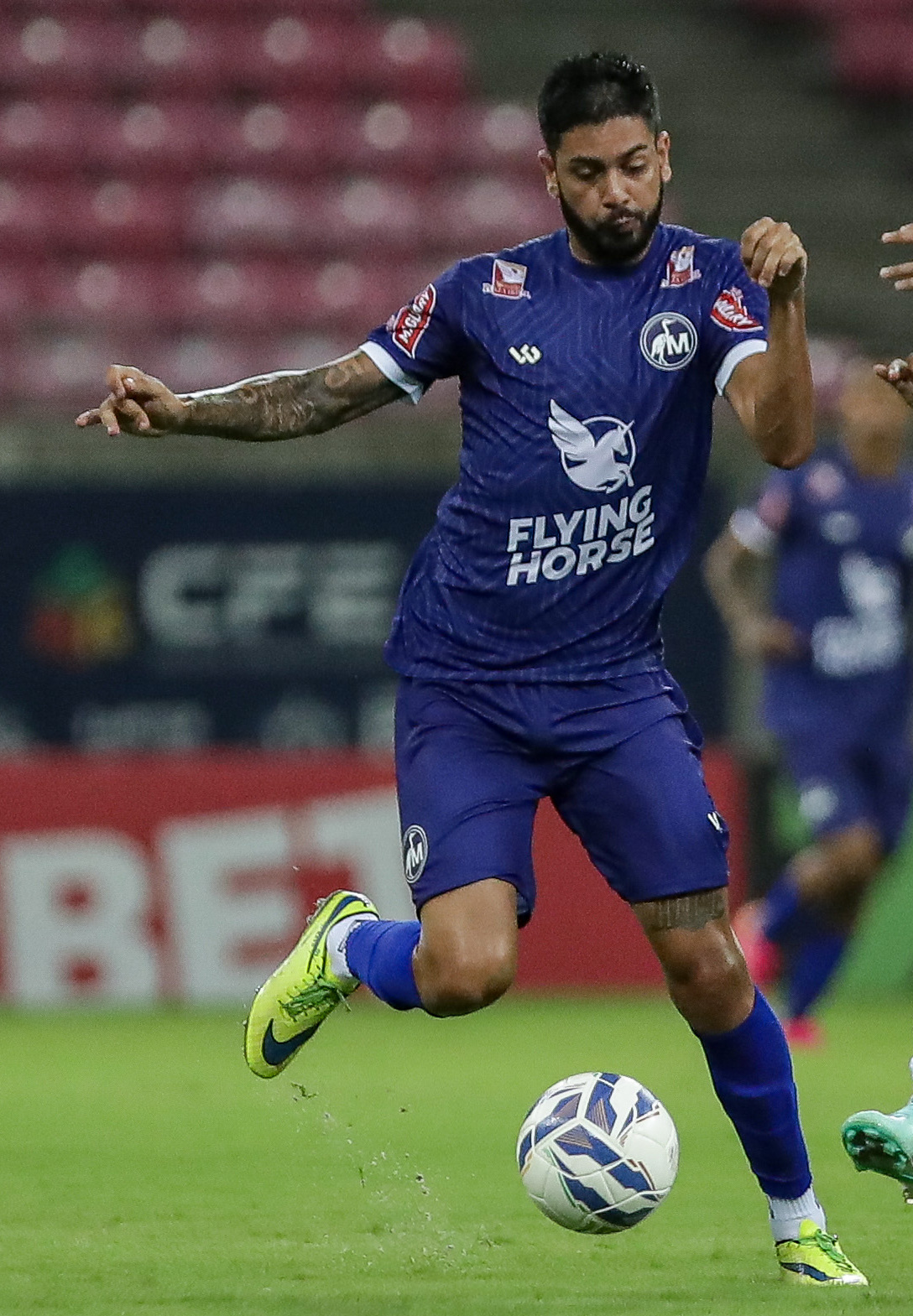
Hericlis playing for Maguary in 2025

On 23 April 2024, Hericlis signed for Cametá. He agreed to a contract with América-PE on 24 August, but served loan stints at Jaguar (helping the club to win the Campeonato Pernambucano Série A2) and back at Maguary; at the latter, he scored five goals in seven matches during the 2025 Campeonato Pernambucano.

On 27 March 2025, Hericlis signed a one-year contract with Portuguesa. On 20 August, however, he returned to América on loan.

On 14 December 2025, Hericlis was announced at Madureira on loan.

== Career statistics ==
As of 27 March 2026

Club	Season	League			State league		Cup		Continental		Other		Total	
Club	Season	Division	Apps	Goals	Apps	Goals	Apps	Goals	Apps	Goals	Apps	Goals	Apps	Goals
Gama	2015	Série D	7	0	15	1	—		—		—		22	1
Gama	2016	Brasiliense	—		11	0	—		—		5 (Note: Appearance(s) in Copa Verde)	0	16	0
Gama	Total		7	0	26	1	—		—		5	0	38	1
Remo	2016	Série C	8	0	—		—		—		—		8	0
Brasiliense	2017	Brasiliense	—		6	0	—		—		—		6	0
Bragantino	2017	Série C	0	0	—		—		—		—		0	0
Santa Cruz	2018	Série C	0	0	8	1	1	0	—		5 (Note: Appearance(s) in Copa do Nordeste)	3	14	4
Santa Cruz	2019	Série C	0	0	0	0	0	0	—		1	0	1	0
Santa Cruz	Total		0	0	8	1	1	0	—		6	3	15	4
Retrô	2020	Pernambucano	—		8	3	—		—		—		8	3
Retrô	2021	Série D	1	0	—		—		—		—		1	0
Retrô	Total		1	0	8	3	—		—		—		9	3
ABC (loan)	2020	Série D	2	0	—		—		—		—		2	0
Salgueiro (loan)	2021	Pernambucano	—		6	0	1	0	—		4	0	11	0
Grêmio Anápolis	2022	Série D	0	0	3	0	0	0	—		—		3	0
Ceilândia	2022	Série D	2	0	6	0	1	0	—		—		9	0
Itumbiara	2022	Goiano 2ª Divisão	—		10	4	—		—		—		10	4
Nunawading City	2023	NPL Victoria 3	5	3	—		—		—		—		5	3
Maguary	2024	Pernambucano	—		8	4	—		—		—		8	4
Cametá	2024	Série D	9	3	—		—		—		—		9	3
Jaguar	2024	Pernambucano Série A2	—		2	2	—		—		—		2	2
Maguary	2025	Pernambucano	—		13	5	—		—		—		13	5
Portuguesa	2025	Série D	8	1	—		—		—		—		8	1
América-PE (loan)	2025	Pernambucano A2	—		4	0	—		—		—		4	0
Madureira (loan)	2026	Série D	—		3	0	1	0	—		—		4	0
Career total			42	7	103	20	4	0	0	0	15	3	164	30

== Honours ==
Jaguar

- Campeonato Pernambucano Série A2: 2024
