= Taboão da Serra =

- Municipality
- Taboão da Serra

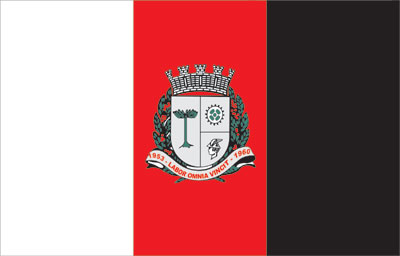
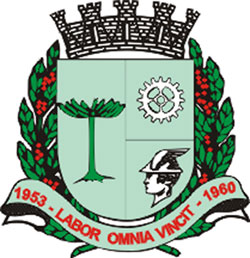
- Flag Coat of arms
- Nickname: Taboão
- Motto: "Urbs labor" (Latin) "Labor omnia vincit"

- Location in Brazil
- Coordinates: 23°31′58″S 46°47′58″W
- Country: Brazil
- Region: Southeast
- State: São Paulo
- Metropolitan Region: São Paulo
- Founded: 1959

Government
  - Mayor: José Aprígio da Silva

Area
  - Total: 20.39 km^{2} (7.87 sq mi)

Population (2022)
  - Total: 273,542
  - Estimate (2025): 285.307
  - Density: 13,420/km^{2} (34,750/sq mi)
- Demonym: taboanense
- Time zone: UTC−3 (BRT)
- Area code: +55 11

Taboão da Serra is a municipality in the state of São Paulo in Brazil. It is part of the Metropolitan Region of São Paulo. The population is 273,542 in an area of 20.39 km^{2} (7.87 sq mi). It is the second smallest city by area in the São Paulo Metropolitan Area (RMSP).

Historical population
Year	Pop.	±%
1970	40,945	—
1980	97,656	+138.5%
1991	160,084	+63.9%
2000	197,644	+23.5%
2010	244,528	+23.7%
2022	273,542	+11.9%

Without significant geographical boundaries with the capital of São Paulo, Taboão da Serra is indistinguishable from the neighborhoods of São Paulo that it borders, such as Butantã and Campo Limpo. In other words, it is a city conurbated with the capital of São Paulo, a phenomenon that has become increasingly common in recent decades in the cities of the Metropolitan Region of São Paulo. For many years, the city was divided between the profile of a dormitory town and an industrial location.

== Geography ==
=== Climate ===
Like the rest of Greater São Paulo, the city has a monsoon-influenced humid subtropical climate (Cfa), according to the Köppen classification. Summers are rainy and not too warm. The winters are rainless and not too cold. The year average temperature is 63.5 (17.5 Cº), and the coldest month is July (Average 55.4 [13 °C]). The hottest month is February with an average temperature of 71.6 (22 °C). Rainfall is abundant, amounting to an annual average of 1,400 millimetres (57.2 in).

== Media ==
In telecommunications, the city was served by Companhia Telefônica Brasileira until 1973, when the service was taken over by Telecomunicações de São Paulo. In July 1998, this company was acquired by Telefónica, which adopted the Vivo brand in 2012.

The company is currently an operator of cell phones, fixed lines, internet (fiber optics/4G) and television (satellite and cable).

== See also ==
- List of municipalities in São Paulo
