= 2025 Associação Portuguesa de Desportos season =

Portuguesa
2025 season
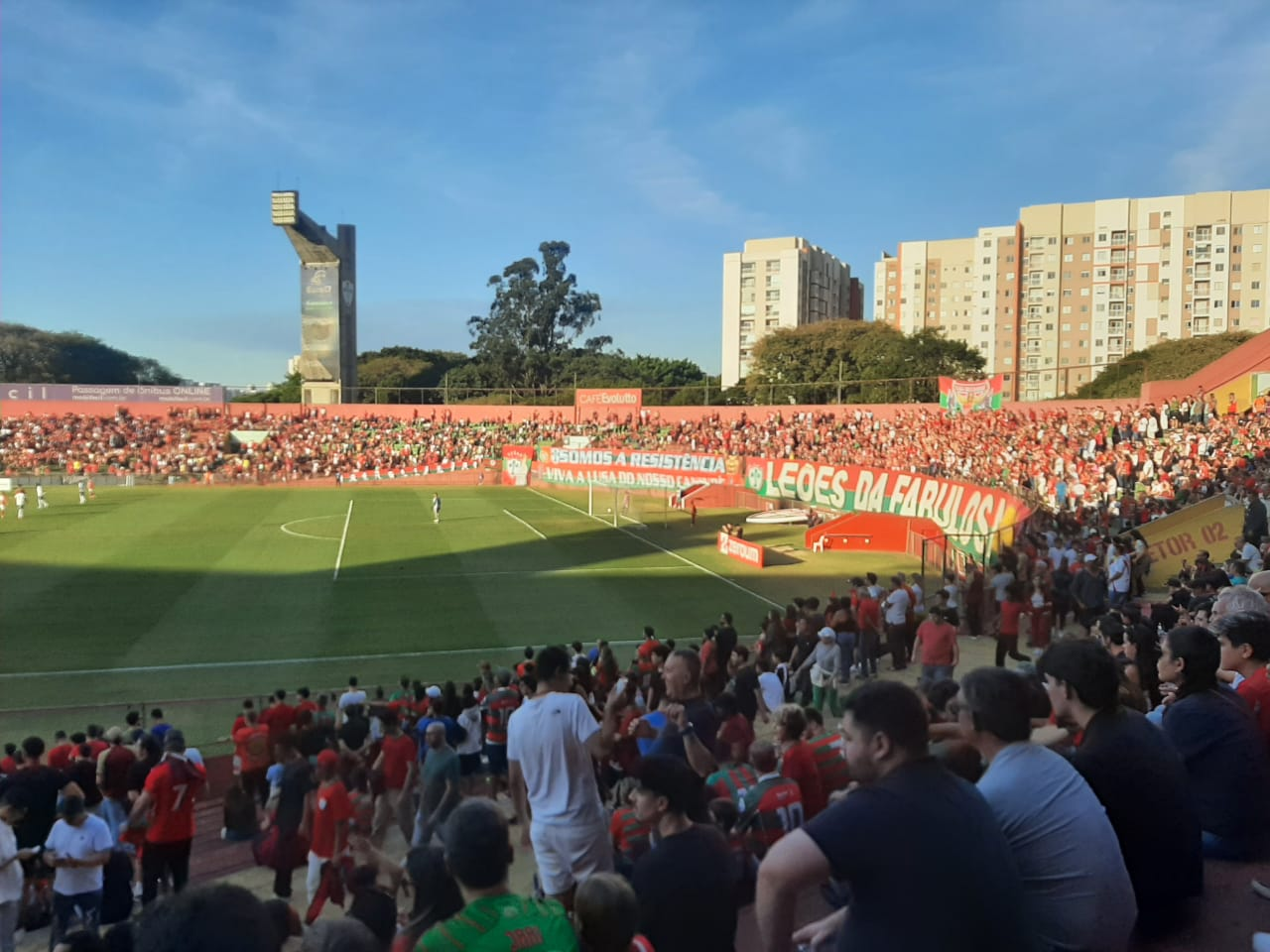
- Portuguesa vs Boavista at the Canindé on 27 July
- President: Antônio Carlos Castanheira
- Head coach: Cauan de Almeida
- Stadium: Canindé
- Série D: Round of 32
- Paulista: 12th
- Copa do Brasil: First round
- Top goalscorer: League: Cristiano (7); All: Cristiano (10)
Home colours	Away colours	Third colours

The 2025 season was Associação Portuguesa de Desportos' 105th season in existence. This season marked the return of Lusa to the fourth tier of Brazilian football after qualifying through the 2024 Campeonato Paulista. Portuguesa also competed in the state league, Campeonato Paulista, and the Copa do Brasil.

== Players ==
=== Squad information ===
As of 11 August 2025

Name	Pos.	Nat.	Place of birth	Date of birth (age)	Caps	Goals	Signed from	Date signed	Fee	Contract end
Goalkeepers
Bruno Bertinato	GK	(Brazil)	Curitiba (Paraná (state))	31 May 1998 (aged 27)	15	0	Venezia (Italy)	19 December 2024	Free	31 December 2026
Estevão	GK	(Brazil)	Belo Horizonte (Minas Gerais)	6 February 2004 (aged 21)	0	0	Youth system	24 February 2024	Free	30 November 2025
João Paulo	GK	(Brazil)	Guarapuava (Paraná (state))	8 March 2001 (aged 24)	0	0	Chapecoense	8 April 2025	Undisc.	30 April 2026
Rafael Pascoal	GK	(Brazil)	Taubaté (São Paulo (state))	2 September 1990 (aged 35)	40	0	Pouso Alegre	27 July 2023	Free	30 November 2025
Defenders
Alysson Dutra	CB/LB	(Brazil)	Belo Horizonte (Minas Gerais)	10 September 1999 (aged 26)	2	0	Rio Claro	11 April 2025	Loan	3 April 2026
Eduardo Biazus	CB/DM	(Brazil)	Curitiba (Paraná (state))	13 March 2001 (aged 24)	23	0	Grêmio Prudente	7 January 2025	Undisc.	13 December 2028
Gustavo Henrique	CB	(Brazil)	Fernando Prestes (São Paulo (state))	17 October 1999 (aged 26)	25	0	CRB	12 December 2024	Undisc.	31 December 2028
Kauã Victor	CB	(Brazil)	Bebedouro (São Paulo (state))	26 November 2004 (aged 21)	15	0	Youth system	14 June 2024	Free	31 December 2026
Robson	CB	(Brazil)	São Bernardo do Campo (São Paulo (state))	6 April 1993 (aged 32)	37	1	XV de Piracicaba	1 July 2022	Free	31 December 2025
Carlos Eduardo	RB	(Brazil)	Araranguá (Santa Catarina (state))	17 November 1996 (aged 29)	5	0	TransINVEST (Lithuania)	10 June 2025	Free	1 June 2026
Gustavo Talles	RB	(Brazil)	São Paulo (São Paulo (state))	14 July 2003 (aged 22)	23	0	Youth system	10 March 2023	Free	31 January 2026
Gustavo Sciencia	RB	(Brazil)	São Bernardo do Campo (São Paulo (state))	1 January 2004 (aged 21)	12	0	Youth system	14 June 2024	Free	30 November 2026
Kauan Firmo	RB	(Brazil)	São Paulo (São Paulo (state))	27 April 2006 (aged 19)	0	0	Youth system	6 June 2025	Free	31 January 2026
Kauê Dias	LB/LW	(Brazil)	São Paulo (São Paulo (state))	9 December 2003 (aged 21)	3	0	Youth system	28 January 2025	Free	31 December 2026
Lucas Hipólito	LB	(Brazil)	Belo Horizonte (Minas Gerais)	14 July 1995 (aged 30)	11	0	Operário Ferroviário	19 December 2024	Free	31 October 2025
Matheus Leal	LB/AM	(Brazil)	Três Marias (Minas Gerais)	7 January 1995 (aged 30)	12	0	Betim	27 March 2025	Undisc.	30 October 2025
Pedro Henrique	LB	(Brazil)	São Paulo (São Paulo (state))	9 December 2003 (aged 21)	37	0	Youth system	27 February 2024	Free	31 December 2025
Midfielders
Barba	DM	(Brazil)	São José do Rio Preto (São Paulo (state))	29 January 1999 (aged 26)	21	0	Novorizontino	12 December 2024	Free	30 September 2025
Matheus Nunes	DM/CM	(Brazil)	Goiânia (Goiás)	5 May 2003 (aged 22)	14	0	Santos	12 December 2024	Loan	16 November 2025
Romulo	DM	(Brazil)	—N/a	8 June 2007 (aged 18)	1	0	Youth system	24 July 2025	Free	28 February 2026
Tauã	DM	(Brazil)	Caraguatatuba (São Paulo (state))	24 February 1995 (aged 30)	106	1	Água Santa	15 June 2021	Free	31 December 2025
Denis	CM/AM	(Brazil)	São Bernardo do Campo (São Paulo (state))	8 January 2004 (aged 21)	16	1	Youth system	30 June 2023	Free	31 December 2025
Franco	CM/RB	(Brazil)	Uberlândia (Minas Gerais)	27 January 1993 (aged 32)	3	0	São José-SP	2 August 2024	Free	30 September 2025
Cristiano	AM/ST	(Brazil)	Campo Mourão (Paraná (state))	12 January 1987 (aged 38)	34	14	Paraná	9 August 2024	Free	20 April 2025
Guilherme Portuga	AM/CM	(Brazil)	Taboão da Serra (São Paulo (state))	16 July 1998 (aged 27)	27	5	Galo Maringá	8 May 2024	Free	30 August 2026
Kerlon	AM/RW	(Brazil)	—N/a	20 April 2006 (aged 19)	0	0	Youth system	24 July 2025	Free	31 January 2027
Marcelo Freitas	AM/CM	(Brazil)	Engenheiro Coelho (São Paulo (state))	1 June 1994 (aged 31)	4	2	Hatta (United Arab Emirates)	9 June 2025	Free	30 July 2027
Forwards
Cauari	LW/RW	(Brazil)	Santos (São Paulo (state))	23 September 2002 (aged 23)	13	2	Galo Maringá	10 April 2025	Undisc.	31 December 2027
De Paula	RW/LW	(Brazil)	Caieiras (São Paulo (state))	14 March 1999 (aged 26)	7	0	Santa Catarina	24 March 2025	Free	20 April 2026
Everton Messias	LW/AM	(Brazil)	Ribeirão Preto (São Paulo (state))	24 February 2002 (aged 23)	16	1	Red Bull Bragantino	12 December 2024	Free	30 March 2026
Iago Dias	RW	(Brazil)	São João Nepomuceno (Minas Gerais)	6 April 1993 (aged 32)	14	0	Ponte Preta	3 January 2025	Loan	30 September 2025
Igor Torres	ST/LW	(Brazil)	São Paulo (São Paulo (state))	11 March 2000 (aged 25)	18	1	Fortaleza	6 February 2025	Free	10 December 2027
Kauã Freire	ST	(Brazil)	—N/a	23 January 2007 (aged 18)	0	0	Youth system	24 July 2025	Free	31 January 2026
Keven Coloni	ST/RW	(Brazil)	Araraquara (São Paulo (state))	14 April 2005 (aged 20)	3	0	Youth system	11 July 2025	Free	31 January 2026
Lohan	ST	(Brazil)	Carmo (Rio de Janeiro (state))	20 September 1995 (aged 30)	12	4	Portuguesa-RJ	31 March 2025	Free	15 April 2026

Source: FPF (for contracts). Players in italic are not registered for the Campeonato Brasileiro Série D.

Campeonato Paulista squad
- *Players in ~~strike~~ were replaced
- A List
- Note: Flags indicate national team as defined under FIFA eligibility rules; some limited exceptions apply. Players may hold more than one non-FIFA nationality.
  No.	Pos.	Nation	Player
  —	GK	BRA	Bruno Bertinato
  —	GK	BRA	Eduardo Batista
  —	GK	BRA	Rafael Pascoal
  —	GK	BRA	Rafael Santos
  —	DF	BRA	Alex Nascimento
  —	DF	BRA	Eduardo Biazus
  —	DF	BRA	Gustavo Henrique
  —	DF	BRA	Maurício
  —	DF	BRA	Robson
  —	DF	BRA	Alex Silva
  —	DF	BRA	Lucas Hipólito
  —	DF	BRA	Pedro Henrique
  —	DF	BRA	Talles
  —	MF	BRA	Barba
  —	MF	BRA	Fernando Henrique
  No.	Pos.	Nation	Player
  —	MF	BRA	Hudson
  —	MF	BRA	Matheus Nunes
  —	MF	BRA	Tauã
  —	MF	BRA	Cristiano
  —	MF	BRA	Daniel Júnior
  —	MF	BRA	Guilherme Portuga
  —	FW	BRA	Everton Maceió
  —	FW	BRA	Everton Messias
  —	FW	BRA	Henrique Almeida
  —	FW	BRA	Iago Dias
  —	FW	BRA	Igor Torres
  —	FW	BRA	Jajá Silva
  —	FW	BRA	Leandro
  —	FW	BRA	Renan Peixoto
  —	FW	BRA	Rildo
- B List
- Note: Flags indicate national team as defined under FIFA eligibility rules; some limited exceptions apply. Players may hold more than one non-FIFA nationality.
  No.	Pos.	Nation	Player
  —	GK	BRA	Estevão
  —	DF	BRA	Kauã Victor
  —	DF	BRA	Gustavo Sciencia
  No.	Pos.	Nation	Player
  —	DF	BRA	Kauê Dias
  —	MF	BRA	Denis
  —	FW	BRA	Deivid Santos

=== Appearances and goals ===
Pos.	Nat	Name	Brasileiro Série D		Paulistão		Copa do Brasil		Total	
Pos.	Nat	Name	Apps	Goals	Apps	Goals	Apps	Goals	Apps	Goals
GK	(Brazil)	Bruno Bertinato	15	0	0	0	0	0	15	0
GK	(Brazil)	Estevão	0	0	0	0	0	0	0	0
GK	(Brazil)	João Paulo	0	0	—		—		0	0
GK	(Brazil)	Rafael Pascoal	1	0	0	0	0	0	1	0
GK	(Brazil)	Rafael Santos	—		12	0	1	0	12	0
DF	(Brazil)	Alex Nascimento	—		6	0	0	0	6	0
DF	(Brazil)	Alysson Dutra	1+1	0	—		—		2	0
DF	(Brazil)	Eduardo Biazus	14	0	7+1	0	1	0	23	0
DF	(Brazil)	Gustavo Henrique	15	0	9	0	1	0	25	0
DF	(Brazil)	Kauã Victor	0+1	0	0	0	0	0	1	0
DF	(Brazil)	Maurício	—		1+3	0	0	0	4	0
DF	(Brazil)	Robson	2	0	1	0	0	0	3	0
DF	(Brazil)	Alex Silva	—		7	0	0	0	7	0
DF	(Brazil)	Carlos Eduardo	5	0	—		—		5	0
DF	(Brazil)	Kauan Firmo	0	0	0	0	0	0	0	0
DF	(Brazil)	Kauê Dias	0+2	0	0+1	0	0	0	3	0
DF	(Brazil)	Lucas Hipólito	0	0	11	0	0	0	11	0
DF	(Brazil)	Matheus Leal	12	0	—		—		12	0
DF	(Brazil)	Pedro Henrique	4+5	0	1+7	0	1	0	18	0
DF	(Brazil)	Sciencia	3+3	0	0	0	0	0	6	0
DF	(Brazil)	Talles	8+1	0	5	0	1	0	15	0
MF	(Brazil)	Barba	10+4	0	2+4	0	1	0	21	0
MF	(Brazil)	Fernando Henrique	—		7+2	0	0+1	0	10	0
MF	(Brazil)	Hudson	—		9+1	0	0	0	10	0
MF	(Brazil)	Matheus Nunes	2+9	0	0+2	0	0+1	0	14	0
MF	(Brazil)	Paulinho Curuá	0	0	—		—		0	0
MF	(Brazil)	Romulo	0+1	0	—		—		1	0
MF	(Brazil)	Tauã	11+1	1	6+5	0	1	0	24	1
MF	(Brazil)	Cristiano	16	7	10	3	0	0	26	10
MF	(Brazil)	Daniel Júnior	—		5	0	0	0	5	0
MF	(Brazil)	Denis	0+5	1	0+2	0	0	0	7	1
MF	(Brazil)	Franco	0	0	0	0	0	0	0	0
MF	(Brazil)	Guilherme Portuga	10+5	1	0+5	0	0+1	0	21	1
MF	(Brazil)	Kerlon	0	0	—		—		0	0
MF	(Brazil)	Marcelo Freitas	4	2	—		—		4	2
FW	(Brazil)	Cauari	10+3	2	—		—		13	2
FW	(Brazil)	De Paula	3+4	0	—		—		7	0
FW	(Brazil)	Deivid Santos	0+1	0	0	0	0+1	0	2	0
FW	(Brazil)	Everton	2+7	0	0+6	1	1	0	16	1
FW	(Brazil)	Fabricio	0	0	—		—		0	0
FW	(Brazil)	Henrique Almeida	—		4+4	0	0	0	8	0
FW	(Brazil)	Hericlis	5+3	1	—		—		8	1
FW	(Brazil)	Iago Dias	3+8	0	0+3	0	0	0	14	0
FW	(Brazil)	Igor Torres	5+9	1	1+2	0	1	0	18	1
FW	(Brazil)	Jajá Silva	—		8+1	3	0	0	9	3
FW	(Brazil)	Kauã Freire	0	0	—		—		0	0
FW	(Brazil)	Keven Coloni	1+2	0	—		—		3	0
FW	(Brazil)	Leandro	—		0	0	0	0	0	0
FW	(Brazil)	Lohan	9+3	4	—		—		12	4
FW	(Brazil)	Maceió	—		11	3	1	0	12	3
FW	(Brazil)	Renan Peixoto	0	0	7+4	3	0	0	11	3
FW	(Brazil)	Rildo	5	2	2+7	2	1	1	15	5

Last updated: 11 August 2025
Source: Match reports in Competitive matches, Soccerway

=== Goalscorers ===
Ran	Pos	Nat	Name	Série D	Paulistão	Copa do Brasil	Total
1	MF	(Brazil)	Cristiano	7	3	0	10
2	FW	(Brazil)	Rildo	2	2	1	5
3	FW	(Brazil)	Lohan	4	—	—	4
4	FW	(Brazil)	Jajá Silva	—	3	0	3
4	FW	(Brazil)	Maceió	—	3	0	3
4	FW	(Brazil)	Renan Peixoto	—	3	0	3
5	MF	(Brazil)	Marcelo Freitas	2	—	—	2
5	FW	(Brazil)	Cauari	2	—	—	2
6	MF	(Brazil)	Denis	1	0	0	1
6	MF	(Brazil)	Guilherme Portuga	1	0	0	1
6	MF	(Brazil)	Tauã	1	0	0	1
6	FW	(Brazil)	Everton Messias	0	1	0	1
6	FW	(Brazil)	Hericlis	1	—	—	1
6	FW	(Brazil)	Igor Torres	1	0	0	1
Own goals				1	0	0	1
Total				23	15	1	39

Last updated: 11 August 2025
Source: Match reports in Competitive matches

=== Disciplinary record ===
Nat	Pos	Name	Série D			Paulistão			Copa do Brasil			Total		
Nat	Pos	Name	Yellow card	(yellow card) (yellow-red card)	Red card	Yellow card	(yellow card) (yellow-red card)	Red card	Yellow card	(yellow card) (yellow-red card)	Red card	Yellow card	(yellow card) (yellow-red card)	Red card
(Brazil)	MF	Tauã	2	0	1	3	0	0	1	0	0	6	0	1
(Brazil)	DF	Eduardo Biazus	2	0	1	2	0	0	0	0	0	4	0	1
(Brazil)	DF	Alex Nascimento	—			1	0	1	0	0	0	1	0	1
(Brazil)	DF	Gustavo Henrique	3	0	0	1	0	0	0	0	0	4	0	0
(Brazil)	MF	Guilherme Portuga	3	0	0	1	0	0	0	0	0	4	0	0
(Brazil)	FW	Everton Messias	4	0	0	0	0	0	0	0	0	4	0	0
(Brazil)	FW	Rildo	2	0	0	2	0	0	0	0	0	4	0	0
(Brazil)	FW	De Paula	0	0	1	—			—			0	0	1
(Brazil)	FW	Maceió	—			0	0	1	0	0	0	0	0	1
(Brazil)	DF	Alex Silva	—			3	0	0	0	0	0	3	0	0
(Brazil)	DF	Matheus Leal	3	0	0	—			—			3	0	0
(Brazil)	DF	Talles	2	0	0	0	0	0	1	0	0	3	0	0
(Brazil)	MF	Barba	3	0	0	0	0	0	0	0	0	3	0	0
(Brazil)	MF	Fernando Henrique	—			3	0	0	0	0	0	3	0	0
(Brazil)	MF	Matheus Nunes	3	0	0	0	0	0	0	0	0	3	0	0
(Brazil)	FW	Cauari	3	0	0	—			—			3	0	0
(Brazil)	FW	Lohan	3	0	0	—			—			3	0	0
(Brazil)	FW	Renan Peixoto	—			3	0	0	0	0	0	3	0	0
(Brazil)	GK	Rafael Santos	—			2	0	0	0	0	0	2	0	0
(Brazil)	DF	Lucas Hipólito	0	0	0	2	0	0	0	0	0	2	0	0
(Brazil)	DF	Sciencia	2	0	0	0	0	0	0	0	0	2	0	0
(Brazil)	MF	Daniel Júnior	—			2	0	0	0	0	0	2	0	0
(Brazil)	MF	Hudson	—			2	0	0	0	0	0	2	0	0
(Brazil)	MF	Marcelo Freitas	2	0	0	—			—			2	0	0
(Brazil)	FW	Igor Torres	2	0	0	0	0	0	0	0	0	2	0	0
(Brazil)	GK	Rafael Pascoal	1	0	0	0	0	0	0	0	0	1	0	0
(Brazil)	DF	Carlos Eduardo	1	0	0	0	0	0	0	0	0	1	0	0
(Brazil)	DF	Pedro Henrique	0	0	0	1	0	0	0	0	0	1	0	0
(Brazil)	DF	Robson	0	0	0	0	0	0	1	0	0	1	0	0
(Brazil)	MF	Cristiano	1	0	0	0	0	0	0	0	0	1	0	0
(Brazil)	MF	Denis	1	0	0	—			—			1	0	0
(Brazil)	FW	Hericlis	1	0	0	—			—			1	0	0
(Brazil)	FW	Iago Dias	1	0	0	0	0	0	0	0	0	1	0	0
Total			40	0	3	28	0	2	3	0	0	71	0	5

As of 11 August 2025
Source: Match reports in Competitive matches (yellow card) = Number of bookings; (yellow card) (yellow-red card) = Number of sending offs after a second yellow card; (red card) = Number of sending offs by a direct red card.

== Managers ==
Name	Nat.	Place of birth	Date of birth (age)	Signed from	Date signed	Role	G	W	D	L	%	Departure	Manner	Contract end
Cauan de Almeida	(Brazil)	Betim (Minas Gerais)	8 February 1989 (age 37)	Free agent	13 November 2024	Permanent	28	11	11	6	39.29			31 December 2025
Léo Cherede	(Brazil)	Bom Jesus do Itabapoana (Rio de Janeiro (state))	6 January 1988 (age 38)	Staff	19 July 2025	Interim (Note: Interim for the match against Maricá as Cauan de Almeida was suspended)	1	1	0	0	100.00	19 July 2025	Return (Note: Back to assistant role after the match)	—N/a

== Transfers ==
=== Transfers in ===
Pos.	Name	Age	Moving from	Type	Fee	Source
DM	(Brazil) Hudson	23	(Brazil) Ponte Preta	Loan return	Free	
AM	(Brazil) Guilherme Portuga	26	(Brazil) Ponte Preta	Loan return	Free	
RB	(Brazil) Talles	21	(Brazil) Avaí	Loan return	Free	
CB	(Brazil) Robson	31	(Brazil) Confiança	Loan return	Free	
DM	(Brazil) Tauã	29	(Brazil) Londrina	Loan return	Free	
GK	(Brazil) Rafael Santos	35	(Brazil) Operário Ferroviário	Transfer	Free	
DM	(Brazil) Barba	25	(Brazil) Novorizontino	Transfer	Free	
LW	(Brazil) Everton Messias	22	(Brazil) Red Bull Bragantino	Transfer	Free	
GK	(Brazil) Bruno Bertinato	26	(Italy) Venezia	Transfer	Free	
LB	(Brazil) Lucas Hipólito	29	(Brazil) Operário Ferroviário	Transfer	Free	
RB	(Brazil) Alex Silva	30	(Brazil) Água Santa	Transfer	Free	
ST	(Brazil) Henrique Almeida	33	(Brazil) Vila Nova	Transfer	Free	
ST	(Brazil) Renan Peixoto	24	(Austria) Schwarz-Weiß Bregenz	Transfer	R$ 600,000	
CB	(Brazil) Eduardo Biazus	23	(Brazil) Grêmio Prudente	Transfer	Undisclosed	
LW	(Brazil) Jajá Silva	26	(Japan) FC Tokyo	Transfer	Undisclosed	
CM	(Brazil) Denis	21	(Brazil) Internacional	Loan return	Free	
ST	(Brazil) Igor Torres	24	(Brazil) Fortaleza	Transfer	Free	
RW	(Brazil) De Paula	26	(Brazil) Santa Catarina	Transfer	Free	
DM	(Brazil) Paulinho Curuá	27	(Brazil) Remo	Transfer	R$ 100,000	
ST	(Brazil) Hericlis	29	(Brazil) América-PE	Transfer	Undisclosed	
LB	(Brazil) Matheus Leal	30	(Brazil) Betim	Transfer	Undisclosed	
ST	(Brazil) Lohan	29	(Brazil) Portuguesa-RJ	Transfer	Free	
GK	(Brazil) João Paulo	24	(Brazil) Chapecoense	Transfer	Undisclosed	
LW	(Brazil) Cauari	22	(Brazil) Galo Maringá	Transfer	Undisclosed	
LW	(Brazil) Fabricio	21	(Mexico) Toluca	Loan return	Free	
AM	(Brazil) Marcelo Freitas	30	(United Arab Emirates) Hatta	Transfer	Free	
RB	(Brazil) Carlos Eduardo	28	(Lithuania) TransINVEST	Transfer	Free	

=== Loans in ===
Pos.	Name	Age	Loaned from	Loan expires	Fee	Source
CB	(Brazil) Gustavo Henrique	25	(Brazil) CRB	April 2025	Free	
DM	(Brazil) Matheus Nunes	21	(Brazil) Santos	November 2025	Free	
CB	(Brazil) Alex Nascimento	25	(Brazil) Santos	April 2025	Free	
DM	(Brazil) Fernando Henrique	23	(Brazil) Cruzeiro	April 2025	Free	
AM	(Brazil) Daniel Júnior	22	(Brazil) Vitória	April 2025	Free	
RW	(Brazil) Iago Dias	31	(Brazil) Ponte Preta	April 2025	Free	
LW	(Brazil) Rildo	24	(Portugal) Santa Clara	July 2025	Free	
CB	(Brazil) Alysson Dutra	25	(Brazil) Rio Claro	April 2026	Free	

=== Transfers out ===
Pos.	Name	Age	Moving to	Type	Fee	Source
CB	(Brazil) Clebson	31	(Brazil) Barcelona de Ilhéus	Contract ended	Free	
CB	(Brazil) Glauco	31	(Brazil) Uberlândia	Contract ended	Free	
AM	(Brazil) Elvis	28	(Brazil) Rio Branco-PR	Loan ended	Free	
ST	(Brazil) Iruan	21	(Brazil) Coritiba	Loan ended	Free	
RW	(Brazil) Theo Lanza	21	(Brazil) Guarani	Loan ended	Free	
RB	(Brazil) Ben-Hur	28	(Brazil) Boavista	Contract ended	Free	
ST	(Brazil) Anderson Magrão	36	(Brazil) Juventus-SP	Contract ended	Free	
LB	(Brazil) Carlos Henrique	23	(Brazil) ASA	Contract ended	Free	
ST	(Panama) Yavir Kadir	21	(Brazil) Paulista	Contract ended	Free	
GK	(Brazil) Ronaldo	21	(Brazil) Grapiúna	Contract ended	Free	
RB	(Brazil) Thomas Ben-Hur	28	(Brazil) Boavista	Contract ended	Free	
LB	(Brazil) Eliel	23	(Brazil) Guarani	Loan ended	Free	
DM	(Brazil) Diogo Crispim	21	(Brazil) Lagarto	Contract ended	Free	
AM	(Brazil) Renan Nunes	21	(Brazil) Rio Claro	Loan ended	Free	
DM	(Brazil) Gabriel Miragaia	22	(Brazil) Dorense	Contract ended	Free	
CB	(Brazil) Portela	21	(Brazil) Inter de Bebedouro	Contract ended	Free	
GK	(Brazil) Thomazella	34	(Brazil) Mirassol	Transfer	Undisclosed	
ST	(Brazil) Renan Peixoto	24	(Brazil) Athletico Paranaense	Transfer	R$ 6,000,000	
ST	(Brazil) Henrique Almeida	33	(Brazil) Amazonas	Contract ended	Free	
ST	(Brazil) Daniel Júnior	22	(Brazil) Vitória	Loan ended	Free	
LW	(Brazil) Jajá Silva	26	(Brazil) Goiás	Transfer	Undisclosed	
RB	(Brazil) Alex Silva	30	(Brazil) Coritiba	Contract rescinded	Free	
DM	(Brazil) Fernando Henrique	23	(Brazil) Cruzeiro	Loan ended	Free	
CB	(Brazil) Alex Nascimento	25	(Brazil) Santos	Loan ended	Free	
CB	(Brazil) Maurício	31	(Myanmar) Shan United	Contract rescinded	Free	
LW	(Brazil) Rildo	25	(Portugal) Santa Clara	Loan ended	Free	
LW	(Brazil) Fabricio	21	(Mexico) Toluca	Transfer	Free	
RW	(Brazil) Deivid Santos	20	(Brazil) Grêmio Prudente	Transfer	Free	
DM	(Brazil) Paulinho Curuá	28	(Vietnam) The Cong-Viettel	Contract rescinded	Free	

=== Loans out ===
Pos.	Name	Age	Loaned to	Loan expires	Source
DM	(Brazil) Hudson	24	(Brazil) Criciúma	November 2025	
RW	(Brazil) Maceió	21	(Brazil) Mirassol	December 2025	
RW	(Brazil) Leandro	22	(Brazil) Lagarto	September 2025	
DM	(Brazil) Jonathan	21	(Brazil) Gaúcho	August 2025	
GK	(Brazil) Rafael Santos	36	(Brazil) Chapecoense	November 2025	
CB	(Brazil) Marco	24	(Brazil) São Bento	October 2025	

== Pre-season and friendlies ==
Win Draw Loss Fixtures

30 December 2024 Friendly	Portuguesa	0–0	São José-SP	São Paulo
		Report		Stadium: CT da Portuguesa

8 January 2025 Friendly	Portuguesa	1–1	São Bento	Porto Feliz
	Renan Peixoto	Report	Wesley Barbosa	Stadium: CT Desportivo Brasil

8 January 2025 Friendly	Portuguesa	0–0	Juventus-SP	Porto Feliz
		Report		Stadium: CT Desportivo Brasil

21 March 2025 Friendly	Ponte Preta	3–1	Portuguesa	Campinas
	Luiz Felipe; Diego Leão; Jean Dias	NetLusa ge	Rildo	Stadium: Moisés Lucarelli

29 March 2025 Friendly	Portuguesa	4–1	Guarani	São Paulo
	Rildo; Guilherme Portuga; Iago Dias; Hericlis	Report	Samuel	Stadium: CT da Portuguesa

5 April 2025 Friendly	Portuguesa	0–1	São Bernardo	São Paulo
		Report	Felipe Azevedo	Stadium: Canindé

12 April 2025 Friendly	Portuguesa	4–2	Inter de Limeira	São Paulo
	Cristiano; Iago Dias; De Paula; Matheus Leal	Report	Juninho; Miguel	Stadium: CT da Portuguesa

26 May 2025 Friendly	Portuguesa	0–0	São José-SP	São Paulo
		Report		Stadium: CT da Portuguesa

== Competitions ==
=== Campeonato Paulista ===
==== Results summary ====
Overall								Home						Away					
Pld	W	D	L	GF	GA	GD	Pts	W	D	L	GF	GA	GD	W	D	L	GF	GA	GD
12	2	7	3	15	16	−1	13	2	3	1	11	9	+2	0	4	2	4	7	−3

Source: Soccerway

==== Group stage ====
Pos	Team	Pld	W	D	L	GF	GA	GD	Pts	Qualification
1	Santos	12	5	3	4	20	14	+6	18	Knockout stage
2	Red Bull Bragantino	12	5	2	5	14	13	+1	17	Knockout stage
3	Guarani	12	3	4	5	14	14	0	13	
4	Portuguesa	12	2	7	3	15	16	−1	13	

Source: Soccerway

===== Matches =====
15 January 1	Palmeiras	2–0	Portuguesa	São Paulo
21:35	Maurício 11', 70'; Rômulo (yellow card) 76'	Report	(yellow card) 52' Lucas Hipólito; (yellow card) 63' Hudson; (yellow card) 90+4' Fernando Henrique	Stadium: Allianz Parque; Referee: João Vitor Gobi

18 January 2	Portuguesa	2–2	Novorizontino	São Paulo
20:30	Cristiano 22' (pen.); Maceió 31'; Daniel Júnior (yellow card) 33'; Alex Nascimento (yellow card) 79'; Renan Peixoto (yellow card) 85'; Alex Silva (yellow card) 90+3'	Report	46' Pedro Balotelli; 86' Pablo Dyego; (yellow card) 87' Waguininho; (yellow card) 89' Airton	Stadium: Canindé; Referee: Luiz Flávio de Oliveira

22 January 3	Ponte Preta	0–0	Portuguesa	Campinas
20:00	Saimon (yellow card) 2'; Dudu (yellow card) 39'; Danrlei (yellow card) 67'; Emerson (yellow card) 90+2'	Report	(red card) 29' Alex Nascimento; (red card) 45+8' Maceió; (yellow card) 90+5' Alex Silva; (yellow card) 90+6' Rafael Santos	Stadium: Moisés Lucarelli; Referee: Edina Alves Batista

26 January 4	Mirassol	2–1	Portuguesa	Mirassol
16:00	Lucas Ramon 45+1'; João Victor (yellow card) 49'; Alex Silva 58' (o.g.); David Braz (yellow card) 82'	Report	(yellow card) 39' Rildo; (yellow card) 60' Fernando Henrique; 63' Jajá; (yellow card) 85' Daniel Júnior	Stadium: Campos Maia; Referee: João Vitor Gobi

29 January 5	Portuguesa	1–2	São Paulo	São Paulo
21:35	Renan Peixoto 14'; Alex Silva (yellow card) 74'; Tauã (yellow card) 90+1'; Fernando Henrique (yellow card) 90+4'	Report	26' (pen.) André Silva; (yellow card) 56' Longo; (yellow card) 80' Patryck; (yellow card) 85' Ruan; 90+2' Ryan Francisco	Stadium: Pacaembu; Referee: Matheus Delgado Candançan

1 February 6	Portuguesa	3–2	Botafogo-SP	São Paulo
16:00	Maceió 6'; Cristiano 24'; Jajá 28'; Renan Peixoto (yellow card) 32'; Rafael Santos (yellow card) 61'; Guilherme Portuga (yellow card) 86'; Pedro Henrique (yellow card) 90+4'	Report	(yellow card) 35' Sabit; 45+5' Maciel; 63' (pen.) Pablo Thomaz; (yellow card) 76' Alisson Cassiano	Stadium: Pacaembu; Referee: Marianna Nanni Batalha

4 February 7	Velo Clube	2–2	Portuguesa	Rio Claro
18:30	Sillas (yellow card) 29' (goal) 52'; Jefferson Nem 30'; Léo Baiano (yellow card) 45+2'; Júlio Vaz (yellow card) 90+2'	Report	(yellow card) 27' Eduardo Biazus; (yellow card) 29' Tauã; 39', 71' Renan Peixoto	Stadium: Benitão; Referee: Flávio Rodrigues de Souza

7 February 8	Portuguesa	2–0	Inter de Limeira	São Paulo
20:30	Cristiano 74' (pen.); Everton 89'; Tauã (yellow card) 90+1'	Report	(yellow card) 48' (yellow card) 80' (yellow-red card) Roberto; (yellow card) 53' Flávio; (yellow card) 73' Ly; (yellow card) 86' Leocovick; (yellow card) 90+5' Rafael Silva	Stadium: Pacaembu; Referee: Renan Pantoja de Quequi

12 February 9	Água Santa	0–0	Portuguesa	Diadema
19:30	Davi Gomes (yellow card) 65'; Renan Castro (yellow card) 90+1'	Report	(yellow card) 24' Hudson	Stadium: Arena Inamar; Referee: Raphael Claus

15 February 10	Portuguesa	2–2	Corinthians	São Paulo
18:30	Jajá 39'; Gustavo Henrique (yellow card) 45+1'; Lucas Hipólito (yellow card) 73'; Maceió 74'	Report	(yellow card) 36' Cacá; (yellow card) 37' Torres; 53' Matheus Bidu; 65' (pen.) Talles Magno	Stadium: Pacaembu; Referee: Daiane Caroline Muniz dos Santos

20 February 11	Portuguesa	1–1	São Bernardo	São Paulo
21:35	Rildo 62' (yellow card) 80'; Eduardo Biazus (yellow card) 69'; Renan Peixoto (yellow card) 71'	Report	(yellow card) 12' Hélder; (yellow card) 65' (goal) 90+4' (pen.) Léo Jabá; (yellow card) 78' Arthur Henrique	Stadium: Pacaembu; Referee: Lucas Canetto Bellote

23 February 12	Noroeste	1–1	Portuguesa	Bauru
18:30	Felipe Rodrigues 5'	Report	26' Rildo	Stadium: Alfredo de Castilho; Referee: João Vitor Gobi

=== Copa do Brasil ===
27 February First round	Portuguesa	1–1 (3–4 p)	Botafogo-PB	São Paulo
20:00	Rildo 12'; Talles (yellow card) 45'; Tauã (yellow card) 78'; Robson (yellow card) 90'	Report	4' (yellow card) 45' Rodrigo Alves; (yellow card) 15' Henrique Dourado; (yellow card) 57' Erick; (yellow card) 57' Natham; (yellow card) 73' Guilherme Santos; (yellow card) 80' Falcão; (yellow card) 90+2' Reniê	Stadium: Pacaembu; Referee: Jonathan Benkenstein Pinheiro
	Penalties
	Maceió (penalty missed); Guilherme Portuga (penalty scored); Fernando Henrique (penalty scored); Eduardo Biazus (penalty scored); Rildo (penalty missed)		(penalty scored) Gama; (penalty missed) Guilherme Santos; (penalty scored) Reniê; (penalty scored) Falcão; (penalty scored) Thallyson

=== Campeonato Brasileiro Série D ===
==== Results summary ====
Overall								Home						Away					
Pld	W	D	L	GF	GA	GD	Pts	W	D	L	GF	GA	GD	W	D	L	GF	GA	GD
16	10	3	3	23	14	+9	33	8	0	0	15	5	+10	2	3	3	8	9	−1

Source: Soccerway

==== Group stage ====
Pos	Team	Pld	W	D	L	GF	GA	GD	Pts	Qualification
1	(São Paulo (state)) Portuguesa	14	9	3	2	22	13	+9	30	Advance to round of 32
2	(Espírito Santo) Rio Branco	14	8	2	4	19	9	+10	26	Advance to round of 32
3	(São Paulo (state)) Água Santa	14	6	3	5	20	18	+2	21	Advance to round of 32
4	(Rio de Janeiro (state)) Maricá	14	5	4	5	14	14	0	19	Advance to round of 32
5	(Minas Gerais) Pouso Alegre	14	5	2	7	13	18	−5	17	

Source: CBF
Rules for classification: 1) points; 2) wins; 3) goal difference; 4) goals scored; 5) head-to-head results (only between 2 teams); 6) fewest red cards; 7) fewest yellow cards; 8) draw.

===== Matches =====
19 April 1	Boavista	2–2	Portuguesa	Saquarema
16:00 UTC-03:00	Lucas Café (yellow card) 42'; Abner (yellow card) 57'; Caetano 81', 90+4'	Report	(yellow card) 39' Talles; 42' Cristiano; 48' Rildo; (red card) 65' De Paula; (yellow card) 70' Igor Torres; (yellow card) 80' Matheus Leal	Stadium: Elcyr Resende de Mendonça; Referee: Renan Novaes Insabralde

26 April 2	Portuguesa	2–1	Maricá	São Paulo
17:00 UTC-03:00	Lohan 26' (yellow card) 54'; Rildo (yellow card) 69'; Hericlis 75'; Igor Torres (yellow card) 87'; Barba (yellow card) 90+1'; Everton (yellow card) 90+4'	Report	(yellow card) 69' Rafael Carioca; 84' Walber	Stadium: Canindé; Referee: Dewson Fernando Freitas da Silva

3 May 3	Água Santa	2–1	Portuguesa	Diadema
19:00 UTC-03:00	Villian (yellow card) 17'; Cesinha 40'; João Guilherme 42'; Marlon (yellow card) 88'; Robles (yellow card) 90+1'	Report	(yellow card) 26' Guilherme Portuga; 80' Rildo	Stadium: Arena Inamar; Referee: Gabriel Henrique Meira Bispo

10 May 4	Portuguesa	2–1	Rio Branco-ES	São Paulo
17:00 UTC-03:00	Cristiano 10', 39' (yellow card) 73'; Talles (yellow card) 72'; Tauã (yellow card) 73'; Barba (yellow card) 83'	Report	36' Luiz Fernando; (yellow card) 40' Júnior Dindê; (yellow card) 65' Diego Fernandes; (yellow card) 75' Darlan; (yellow card) Gustavo Carbonieri	Stadium: Canindé; Referee: Daniel Alejandro Hidalgo Blanco

17 May 5	Porto Vitória	1–3	Portuguesa	Vitória
17:00 UTC-03:00	João Victor (yellow card) 8'; Willian Simões 87'	Report	(yellow card) 39' (goal) 42' Cauari; (yellow card) 45' Gustavo Henrique; (yellow card) 59' Eduardo Biazus; 81' Guilherme Portuga; 85' Igor Torres; (yellow card) 88' Everton	Stadium: Kleber Andrade; Referee: Ronei Candido Alves

24 May 6	Portuguesa	2–1	Pouso Alegre	São Paulo
17:00 UTC-03:00	Cauari 31'; Cristiano 42'; Everton (yellow card) 86'; Rildo (yellow card) 90+6'	Report	59' (yellow card) 90+6' Adsson; (yellow card) 71' Léo Guerra; (yellow card) 87' Sandro Rios	Stadium: Canindé; Referee: Felipe da Silva Gonçalves Paludo

31 May 7	Nova Iguaçu	1–1	Portuguesa	Rio de Janeiro
15:00 UTC-03:00	Cristiano 6'; Cauari (yellow card) 16'; Denis (yellow card) 39'	Report	(yellow card) 9' Caio Hones; 31' (yellow card) 86' Sidney Pages; (yellow card) 51' Renan Arantes; (yellow card) 79' Pedro Rodrigues	Stadium: Moça Bonita; Referee: Gabriel dos Santos Queiroz

7 June 8	Portuguesa	1–0	Nova Iguaçu	São Paulo
17:00 UTC-03:00	Everton (yellow card) 19'; Cauan de Almeida (yellow card) 22'; Eduardo Biazus (red card) 65'; Daniel Zavoli 85' (o.g.); Sciencia (yellow card) 89'	Report	(yellow card) 44' Sidney Pages; (yellow card) 65' Fernandinho; (red card) 65' Xandinho; (yellow card) 71' Andrey Dias	Stadium: Canindé; Referee: Marcos Mateus de Sousa

14 June 9	Pouso Alegre	2–0	Portuguesa	Pouso Alegre
17:00 UTC-03:00	Ravanelli 27'; Thiago Rubim (yellow card) 30'; Léo Muchacho (yellow card) 45' (goal) 81' (pen.) (yellow card) 45' (yellow-red card) 81'; Da Silva (yellow card) 56'; Brown (yellow card) 85'	Report	(yellow card) 12' Sciencia; (yellow card) 30' Hericlis; (yellow card) 62' Matheus Nunes	Stadium: Manduzão; Referee: Marcos Mateus Pereira

28 June 10	Portuguesa	2–1	Porto Vitória	São Paulo
17:00 UTC-03:00	Marcelo Freitas (yellow card) 22' (goal) 23'; Gustavo Henrique (yellow card) 28'; Rafael Pascoal (yellow card) 30'; Tauã 90+1'; Iago Dias (yellow card) 90+3'; Guilherme Portuga (yellow card) 90+6'	Report	(yellow card) 33' João Paulo; 62' Matheus Firmino; (yellow card) 65' Araújo; (yellow card) 73' Willian Simões	Stadium: Canindé; Referee: Pedro Alves De Oliveira

5 July 11	Rio Branco-ES	0–0	Portuguesa	Cariacica
17:00 UTC-03:00	Marcelo Freitas (yellow card) 46'; Matheus Leal (yellow card) 87'	Report	(yellow card) 61' Bruno Silva	Stadium: Kleber Andrade; Referee: Francisco Soares Dias

12 July 12	Portuguesa	2–1	Água Santa	São Paulo
17:00 UTC-03:00	Marcelo Freitas 3'; Tauã (yellow card) 12'; Gustavo Henrique (yellow card) 38'; Guilherme Portuga (yellow card) 55'; Lohan (yellow card) 66' (goal) 84'; Eduardo Biazus (yellow card) 70'; Matheus Nunes (yellow card) 85'	Report	40' Lucas Duni; (yellow card) 72' Carlão; (yellow card) 82' Luis Otávio; (yellow card) Gabriel Vidal	Stadium: Canindé; Referee: Paulo Roberto Alves Junior

19 July 13	Maricá	0–1	Portuguesa	Maricá
16:00 UTC-03:00	Sandro (yellow card) 22'; Jonathan Chula (red card) 42'	Report	(yellow card) 58' Cauari; 71' Lohan	Stadium: João Saldanha; Referee: José Mendonça da Silva Júnior

26 July 14	Portuguesa	3–0	Boavista	São Paulo
16:00 UTC-03:00	Cristiano 27', 36' (pen.); Denis 63'	Report	(yellow card) 57' Rafael Longuine	Stadium: Canindé; Referee: Eleniel Benedito da Silva

==== Round of 32 ====
2 August First leg	Mixto	1–0	Portuguesa	Cuiabá
18:00	Felipe Santiago (yellow card) 21'; Gilvan 31' (pen.)	Report	(yellow card) 17' Matheus Leal; (yellow card) 53' Carlos Eduardo; (yellow card) 90+2' Matheus Nunes; (yellow card) 90+4' Lohan	Stadium: Dutrinha; Referee: Ivan da Silva Guimaraes Junior

9 August Second leg	Portuguesa	1–0 (3–4 p)	Mixto	São Paulo
16:00	Barba (yellow card) 31'; Lohan 78'; Tauã (red card) 80'	Report	(yellow card) 29' Dionathã; (yellow card) 38' Alexandre Souza; (yellow card) 39' Uesley Gaúcho; (yellow card) 56' Geovani; (yellow card) 60' Juninho Ramos	Stadium: Canindé; Referee: Roger Goulart
	Penalties
	Cristiano (penalty missed); Guilherme Portuga (penalty scored); Eduardo Biazus (penalty missed); Igor Torres (penalty scored); Pedro Henrique (penalty scored); Matheus Nunes (penalty missed)		(penalty scored) Gilvan; (penalty scored) Geovani; (penalty scored) Dionathã; (penalty missed) Daniel Vançan; (penalty missed) Paulo Miranda; (penalty scored) Gabriel Justino
