= Gustavo Talles =

Brazilian footballer

Personal information
- Full name: Gustavo Talles da Silva
- Date of birth: 14 July 2003 (age 23)
- Place of birth: São Paulo, Brazil
- Height: 1.77 m (5 ft 10 in)
- Position: Right-back

Team information
- Current team: Chapecoense
- Number: 20

Youth career
- 2014–2020: Juventus-SP
- 2020–2023: Portuguesa

Senior career*
Years	Team	Apps	(Gls)
2023–2025	Portuguesa	20	(0)
2024	→ Avaí (loan)	3	(0)
2025–	Chapecoense	0	(0)
- * Club domestic league appearances and goals as of 15:32, 11 August 2025 (UTC)

Gustavo Talles da Silva (born 14 July 2003), known as Gustavo Talles or just Talles, is a Brazilian footballer who plays as a right-back for Chapecoense.

== Career ==
Born in São Paulo, Talles joined Portuguesa's youth setup in 2020, from Juventus-SP. On 19 December 2021, he renewed his contract with the former.

On 10 March 2023, Talles was registered in the main squad for the 2023 Campeonato Paulista, but did not feature in the competition. He made his first team debut on 15 February 2024, starting in a 1–1 home draw against Água Santa.

On 3 July 2024, Portuguesa confirmed Talles' loan to Série B side Avaí until the end of the year. Back to Lusa for the 2025 season, he featured sparingly before being announced at Chapecoense on 2 September of that year.

== Career statistics ==
As of 25 October 2025

Club	Season	League			State League		Cup		Continental		Other		Total	
Club	Season	Division	Apps	Goals	Apps	Goals	Apps	Goals	Apps	Goals	Apps	Goals	Apps	Goals
Portuguesa	2023	Paulista	—		0 (Note: Soccerway attribute one appearance to Talles in the match against São Bento, but the player who featured in that match was Gustavo Bochecha)	0	—		—		0	0	0	0
Portuguesa	2024	Paulista	—		6	0	—		—		2 (Note: Appearance(s) in Copa Paulista)	0	8	0
Portuguesa	2025	Série D	9	0	5	0	1	0	—		—		15	0
Portuguesa	Total		9	0	11	0	1	0	—		2	0	23	0
Avaí (loan)	2024	Série B	3	0	—		—		—		—		3	0
Chapecoense	2025	Série B	1	0	—		—		—		3 (Note: Appearance(s) in Copa Santa Catarina)	0	4	0
Career total			13	0	11	0	1	0	0	0	5	0	30	0
