= Carlos Eduardo (footballer, born November 1996) =

Brazilian footballer

Personal information
- Full name: Carlos Eduardo da Silva Cândido
- Date of birth: 17 November 1996 (age 29)
- Place of birth: Araranguá, Brazil
- Height: 1.79 m (5 ft 10 in)
- Position: Right-back

Youth career
- 2012–2016: Criciúma

Senior career*
Years	Team	Apps	(Gls)
2016–2019	Criciúma	47	(1)
2020	Atlético Tubarão	8	(0)
2021–2022	Hercílio Luz	10	(0)
2022–2024	Banga Gargždai	43	(3)
2024–2025	TransINVEST	12	(0)
2025–2026	Portuguesa	5	(0)
2026	→ Santo André (loan)	0	(0)
- * Club domestic league appearances and goals as of 20:15, 5 August 2025 (UTC)

Carlos Eduardo da Silva Cândido (born 17 November 1996), known as Carlos Eduardo, is a Brazilian footballer who plays as a right-back.

== Career ==
Born in Araranguá, Santa Catarina, Carlos Eduardo was a Criciúma youth graduate. He made his first team debut on 9 April 2016, coming on as a second-half substitute for Ricardinho in a 5–0 Campeonato Catarinense home routing of Camboriú.

Carlos Eduardo became a regular starter for Criciúma only in the 2019 season, but suffered a clavicle injury in October of that year, being sidelined for nearly a month. He left the club in January 2020, after failing to agree new terms, and signed for Atlético Tubarão on 2 October of that year.

On 28 January 2021, Carlos Eduardo moved to Hercílio Luz. Rarely used, he moved abroad in October 2022 to join Banga Gargždai in Lithuania; at his new club, he scored on his debut, a 2–2 away draw against Riteriai.

After becoming a first-choice, Carlos Eduardo renewed his contract with Banga on 7 February 2024. On 15 July, however, he moved to fellow league team TransINVEST.

On 10 June 2025, Carlos Eduardo returned to his home country after signing for Portuguesa.

== Career statistics ==
As of 5 August 2025

Club	Season	League			State League		Cup		Continental		Other		Total	
Club	Season	Division	Apps	Goals	Apps	Goals	Apps	Goals	Apps	Goals	Apps	Goals	Apps	Goals
Criciúma	2016	Série B	0	0	1	0	1	0	—		—		2	0
Criciúma	2017	Série B	2	0	4	1	0	0	—		2 (Note: Appearance(s) in Primeira Liga)	1	8	2
Criciúma	2018	Série B	8	0	6	0	2	0	—		—		16	0
Criciúma	2019	Série B	16	0	10	0	2	0	—		—		28	0
Criciúma	Total		26	0	21	1	5	0	—		2	1	54	2
Atlético Tubarão	2020	Série D	8	0	—		—		—		—		8	0
Hercílio Luz	2021	Catarinense	—		8	0	—		—		—		8	0
Hercílio Luz	2022	Catarinense	—		2	0	—		—		—		2	0
Hercílio Luz	Total		—		10	0	—		—		—		10	0
Banga Gargždai	2022	A Lyga	5	0	—		—		—		—		5	0
Banga Gargždai	2023	A Lyga	25	1	—		2	0	—		—		27	1
Banga Gargždai	2024	A Lyga	13	1	—		2	0	—		—		15	1
Banga Gargždai	Total		43	2	—		4	0	—		—		47	2
TransINVEST	2024	A Lyga	10	0	—		—		2 (Note: Appearance(s) in UEFA Conference League)	0	—		12	0
TransINVEST	2025	I Lyga	2	0	—		1	0	—		—		3	0
TransINVEST	Total		12	0	—		1	0	2	0	—		15	0
Portuguesa	2025	Série D	5	0	—		—		—		—		5	0
Santo André (loan)	2026	Paulista A2	—		0	0	—		—		—		0	0
Career total			94	2	31	1	10	0	2	0	2	1	139	4
