= Everton Messias =

Brazilian footballer

Everton
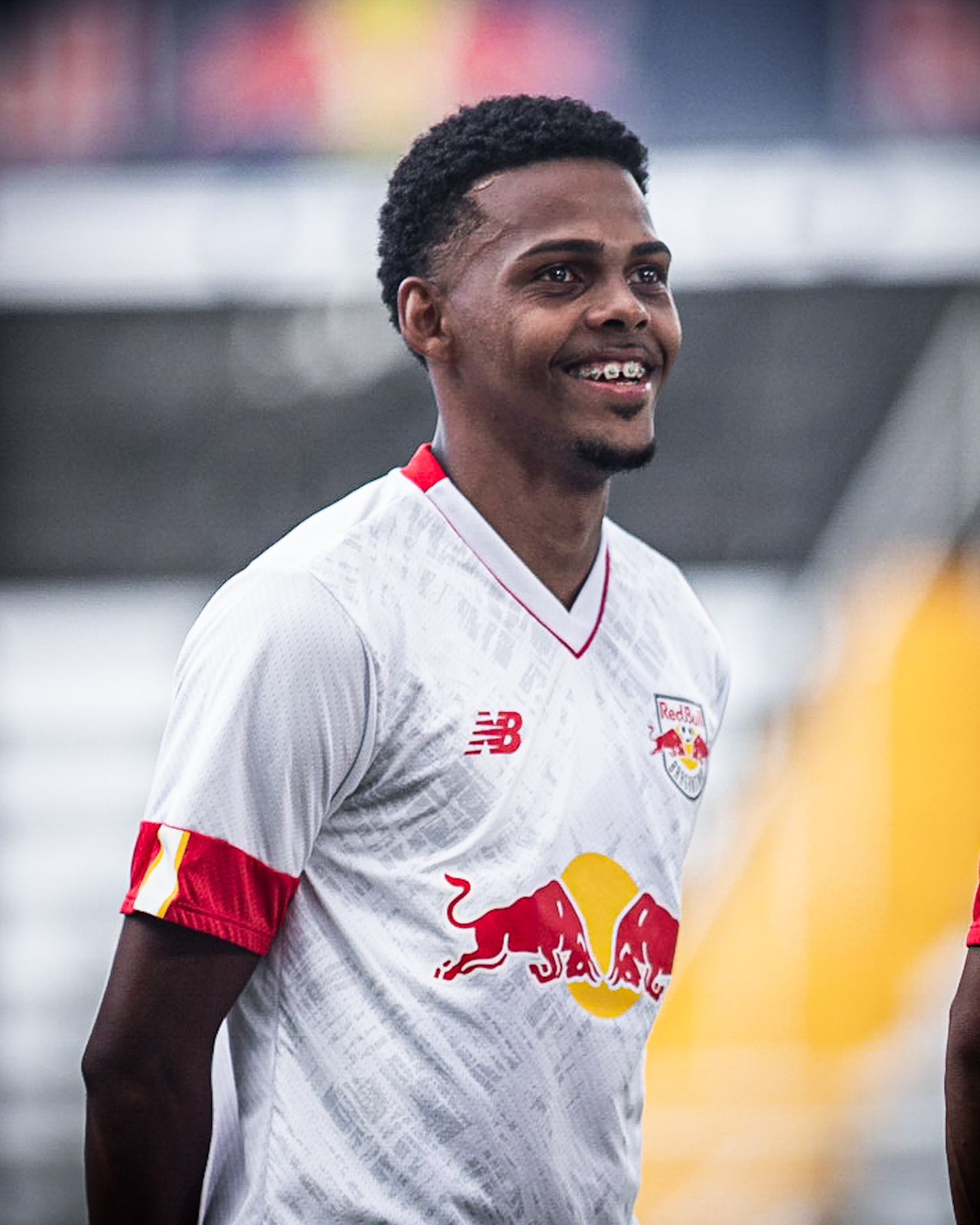
- Everton with Red Bull Bragantino II in 2023

Personal information
- Full name: Everton Tiago Barella de Souza Messias
- Date of birth: 24 February 2002 (age 24)
- Place of birth: Ribeirão Preto, Brazil
- Height: 1.70 m (5 ft 7 in)
- Position: Forward

Youth career
- 2017–2020: Red Bull Brasil
- 2020–2022: Red Bull Bragantino

Senior career*
Years	Team	Apps	(Gls)
2021–2024	Red Bull Bragantino II	56	(8)
2023–2024	Red Bull Bragantino	1	(0)
2024	→ Vila Nova (loan)	1	(0)
2025–2026	Portuguesa	15	(1)
2026	→ Madureira (loan)	7	(0)
- * Club domestic league appearances and goals as of 13:49, 27 March 2026 (UTC)

Everton Tiago Barella de Souza Messias (born 24 February 2002), known as Everton Messias or just Everton, is a Brazilian footballer who plays as a forward.

== Career ==
Born in Ribeirão Preto, São Paulo, Everton joined Red Bull Brasil's youth setup in 2017, aged 15. He moved to the structure of Red Bull Bragantino in 2020, initially featuring for the under-23s in the Campeonato Brasileiro de Aspirantes.

Everton made his senior debut with RB Brasil on 6 March 2021, coming on as a late substitute in a 1–1 Campeonato Paulista Série A2 away draw against São Bernardo. He scored his first senior goal on 2 February 2022, netting the opener in a 1–1 away draw against Portuguesa Santista.

Everton made his first team debut with Braga on 6 April 2023, replacing fellow youth graduate Talisson in a 4–1 away routing of Tacuary, for the year's Copa Sudamericana. On 4 December 2023, he renewed his contract with the club.

Everton made his Série A debut on 29 June 2024, replacing Vitinho in a 1–1 away draw against Cuiabá. On 22 July, he was presented at Vila Nova on loan until the end of the season.

On 13 November 2024, after just one first team match, Everton's loan was cut short. On 12 December, he was announced at Portuguesa.

On 10 December 2025, Everton moved to Madureira on loan.

== Career statistics ==
As of 27 March 2026.

Club	Season	League			State League		Cup		Continental		Other		Total	
Club	Season	Division	Apps	Goals	Apps	Goals	Apps	Goals	Apps	Goals	Apps	Goals	Apps	Goals
Red Bull Bragantino II	2021	Paulista A2	—		15	0	—		—		—		15	0
Red Bull Bragantino II	2022	Paulista A2	—		13	2	—		—		—		13	2
Red Bull Bragantino II	2023	Paulista A3	—		13	3	—		—		9 (Note: Appearance(s) in Copa Paulista)	0	22	3
Red Bull Bragantino II	2024	Paulista A3	—		15	3	—		—		1	0	16	3
Red Bull Bragantino II	Total		—		56	8	—		—		10	0	66	8
Red Bull Bragantino	2023	Série A	0	0	—		0	0	2 (Note: Appearance(s) in Copa Sudamericana)	0	—		2	0
Red Bull Bragantino	2024	Série A	1	0	—		0	0	0	0	—		1	0
Red Bull Bragantino	Total		1	0	—		0	0	2	0	—		3	0
Vila Nova (loan)	2024	Série B	1	0	—		—		—		—		1	0
Portuguesa	2025	Série D	9	0	6	1	1	0	—		—		16	1
Madureira (loan)	2026	Série D	—		7	0	2	0	—		—		9	0
Career total			11	0	69	9	3	0	2	0	10	0	95	9
