= Matheus Nunes (footballer, born 2003) =

Brazilian footballer

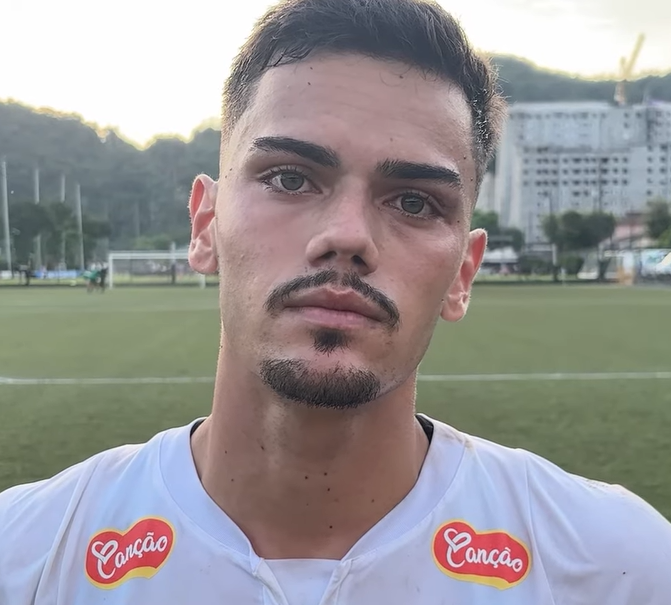
- Matheus Nunes in 2024

Personal information
- Full name: Matheus Nunes da Silva
- Date of birth: 5 May 2003 (age 23)
- Place of birth: Goiânia, Brazil
- Height: 1.81 m (5 ft 11 in)
- Position: Midfielder

Team information
- Current team: Caxias

Youth career
- 2010–2017: Goiás
- 2017–2023: Santos

Senior career*
Years	Team	Apps	(Gls)
2024–2025	Santos	0	(0)
2024	→ Centro Oeste (loan)	11	(1)
2025	→ Portuguesa (loan)	13	(0)
2026–	Caxias	19	(0)
- * Club domestic league appearances and goals as of 1 November 2026

Matheus Nunes da Silva (born 5 May 2003), known as Matheus Nunes, is a Brazilian footballer who plays as a midfielder for Caxias.

== Career ==
=== Santos ===
Born in Goiânia, Goiás, Matheus Nunes began his career with Goiás EC at the age of seven, before joining Santos' youth sides in 2017, aged 14. On 26 December 2022, after winning the Campeonato Paulista Sub-20 with the under-20 squad, he agreed to renew his contract for three seasons, and signed the new link until December 2025 on 24 January 2023.

In April 2023, Matheus Nunes underwent surgery to fix a knee injury, being sidelined for the remainder of the year. Declared fit to play in January 2024, he was not registered with the under-20s for the 2024 Copa São Paulo de Futebol Júnior and was later deemed surplus to requirements.

==== Loan to Centro Oeste ====
On 24 April 2024, Matheus Nunes was loaned to Centro Oeste for the year's Campeonato Goiano Segunda Divisão. He made his senior debut four days later, coming on as a late substitute in a 3–0 away win over ABECAT.

Matheus Nunes scored his first senior goal on 4 May 2024, netting the opener in a 1–1 home draw against Santa Helena. Regularly used, he returned to Santos in August, being assigned to the under-23 team.

==== Loan to Portuguesa ====
On 12 December 2024, Matheus Nunes was announced at Portuguesa for the upcoming season.

== Career statistics ==
As of 11 August 2025

Club	Season	League			State League		Cup		Continental		Other		Total	
Club	Season	Division	Apps	Goals	Apps	Goals	Apps	Goals	Apps	Goals	Apps	Goals	Apps	Goals
Santos	2024	Série B	0	0	—		—		—		—		0	0
Centro Oeste (loan)	2024	Goiano 2ª Divisão	—		11	1	—		—		—		11	1
Portuguesa (loan)	2025	Série D	11	0	2	0	1	0	—		—		14	0
Caxias	2026	Série C	0	0	0	0	—		—		—		0	0
Career total			11	0	13	1	1	0	0	0	0	0	25	1

== Honours ==
Santos

- Campeonato Paulista Sub-20: 2022
