= Leandro (footballer, born 2003) =

Brazilian footballer

Personal information
- Full name: Leandro Pinto Bernardo
- Date of birth: 22 January 2003 (age 23)
- Place of birth: São Paulo, Brazil
- Height: 1.72 m (5 ft 8 in)
- Position: Forward

Team information
- Current team: Altos

Youth career
- 2014–2017: Palmeiras
- 2018–2022: Audax
- 2023–2024: Portuguesa

Senior career*
Years	Team	Apps	(Gls)
2024–2025	Portuguesa	2	(0)
2025	→ Lagarto (loan)	10	(1)
2025	→ Oeste (loan)	0	(0)
2026	Atlético de Cajazeiras	9	(1)
2026–	Altos	0	(0)
- * Club domestic league appearances and goals as of 14:51, 17 March 2026 (UTC)

Leandro Pinto Bernardo (born 22 January 2003), simply known as Leandro, is a Brazilian footballer who plays as a forward for Altos.

== Career ==
A youth graduate of Palmeiras and Audax, Leandro joined Portuguesa's youth setup for the 2023 season. On 7 February 2024, after impressing in the year's Copa São Paulo de Futebol Júnior, he made his first team debut by coming on as a late substitute for Douglas Borel in a 1–0 Campeonato Paulista away loss to São Bernardo.

Leandro made his first start for Lusa on 10 March 2024, in a 2–0 away loss to Novorizontino. He featured regularly in the year's Copa Paulista, but after failing to make an appearance in the 2025 Campeonato Paulista, he was loaned to fellow Série D side Lagarto on 28 March 2025.

On 22 August 2025, Leandro was loaned to Oeste until the end of the Copa Paulista. On 13 November, he was announced at Atlético de Cajazeiras for the upcoming season.

On 16 March 2026, Leandro agreed to a deal with Altos.

== Career statistics ==
As of 17 March 2026

Club	Season	League			State League		Cup		Continental		Other		Total	
Club	Season	Division	Apps	Goals	Apps	Goals	Apps	Goals	Apps	Goals	Apps	Goals	Apps	Goals
Portuguesa	2024	Paulista	—		2	0	—		—		11 (Note: Appearance(s) in Copa Paulista)	0	13	0
Portuguesa	2025	Série D	0	0	0	0	0	0	—		—		0	0
Portuguesa	Total		0	0	2	0	0	0	—		11	0	13	0
Lagarto (loan)	2025	Série D	10	1	—		—		—		4 (Note: Appearance(s) in Copa Governo do Estado de Sergipe)	0	14	1
Oeste (loan)	2025	Paulista A2	—		—		—		—		4	0	4	0
Atlético de Cajazeiras	2026	Paraibano	—		9	1	—		—		—		9	1
Altos	2026	Série D	0	0	—		—		—		0	0	0	0
Career total			10	1	11	1	0	0	0	0	19	0	40	2
