= Renan Peixoto =

Brazilian footballer

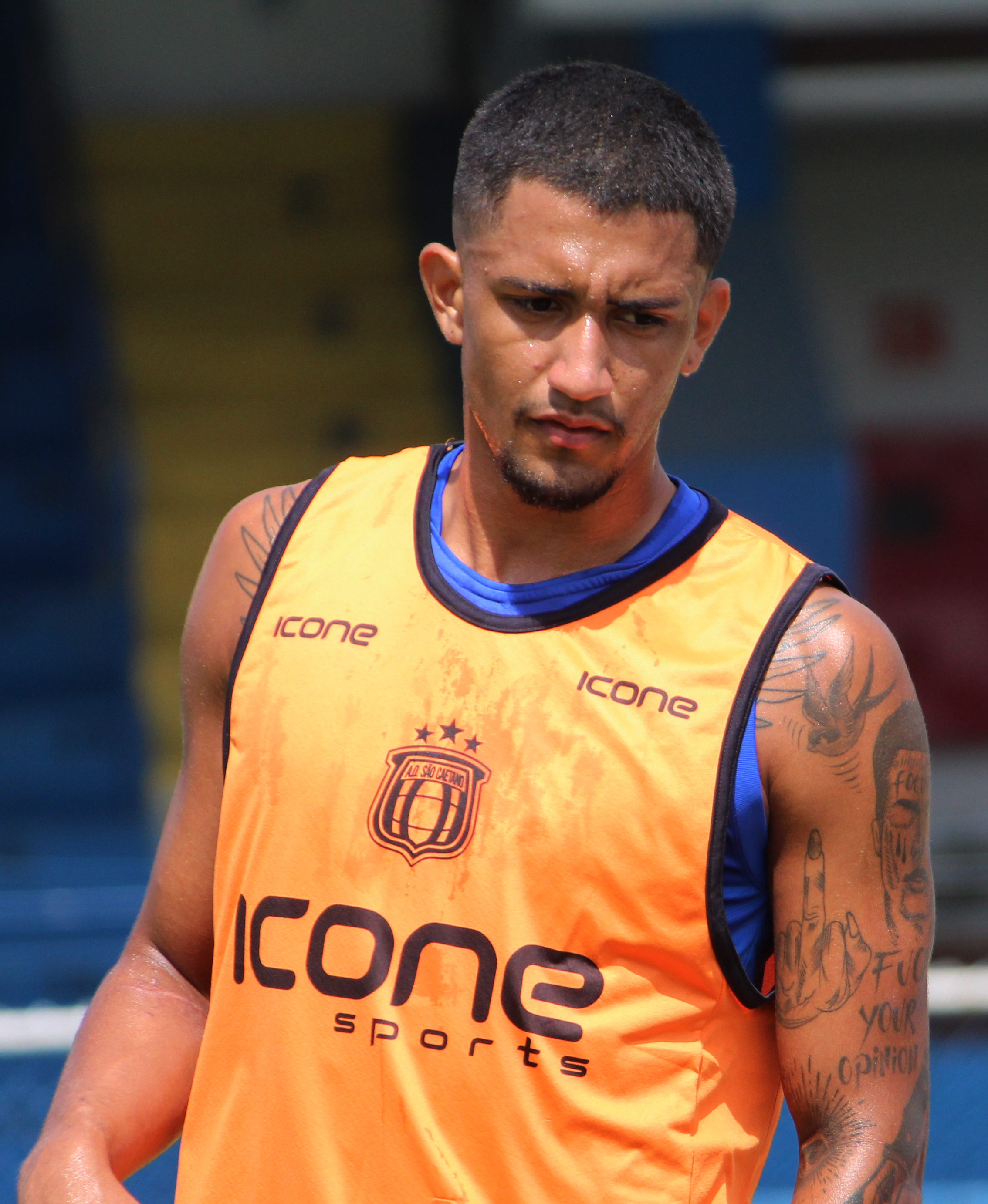
- Renan training with São Caetano in 2021

Personal information
- Full name: Renan Peixoto Nepomuceno
- Date of birth: 21 February 2000 (age 26)
- Place of birth: Rio de Janeiro, Brazil
- Height: 1.85 m (6 ft 1 in)
- Position: Forward

Team information
- Current team: Athletico Paranaense
- Number: 70

Youth career
- Olaria
- 2018–2020: São Caetano
- 2018: → Corinthians (loan)
- 2019: → América Mineiro (loan)

Senior career*
Years	Team	Apps	(Gls)
2019–2021	São Caetano	3	(0)
2021–2022	SC Röthis	25	(24)
2022–2023	FC Dornbirn	14	(10)
2023	Seoul E-Land	0	(0)
2024	FC Dornbirn	6	(2)
2024	Schwarz-Weiß Bregenz	14	(9)
2025	Portuguesa	11	(3)
2025–	Athletico Paranaense	37	(8)
- * Club domestic league appearances and goals as of 15:53, 10 November 2026 (UTC)

Renan Peixoto Nepomuceno (born 21 February 2000), known as Renan Peixoto or just Renan, is a Brazilian professional footballer who plays as a forward for Athletico Paranaense.

== Career ==
Born in Rio de Janeiro, Renan played for the youth sides of Olaria before impressing for amateur side Cancela Preta in the 2017 Taça das Favelas, a tournament between favelas in Brazil. This prompted to a move to São Caetano in 2018, and a loan to Corinthians followed, with the club purchasing 10% of his economic rights.

On 28 February 2019, Renan moved to América Mineiro also on loan. After only playing for the under-20s, he returned to Azulão, making his senior debut on 19 October of that year in a 2–0 Copa Paulista home loss to Mirassol.

In 2021, after featuring rarely at São Caetano, Renan moved to Austria and joined SC Röthis in the Eliteliga Vorarlberg. He scored 26 goals for the side (24 in the league), which led him to a move to 2. Liga side FC Dornbirn on 2 June 2022.

On 6 January 2023, Renan was announced at K League 2 side Seoul E-Land. On 11 November, he rescinded his contract by mutual consent, after making no appearances for the side and struggling with injuries.

On 6 February 2024, Renan returned to Dornbirn. On 18 July, after scoring twice in six appearances, he moved to fellow second division side Schwarz-Weiß Bregenz.

On 7 January 2025, Renan returned to his home country after signing for Portuguesa, for R$ 600,000. On 25 February, he was sold to Athletico Paranaense after the club bought 70% of his economic rights for a fee of R$ 6 million.

== Career statistics ==
As of 10 November 2026

Club	Season	League			State League		Cup		Continental		Other		Total	
Club	Season	Division	Apps	Goals	Apps	Goals	Apps	Goals	Apps	Goals	Apps	Goals	Apps	Goals
São Caetano	2019	Série D	—		—		—		—		1 (Note: Appearance(s) in Copa Paulista)	0	1	0
São Caetano	2020	Série D	1	0	0	0	0	0	—		—		1	0
São Caetano	2021	Paulista	—		2	0	—		—		—		2	0
São Caetano	Total		1	0	2	0	0	0	—		1	0	4	0
SC Röthis	2021–22	Eliteliga Vorarlberg	25	24	—		1	2	—		—		26	26
FC Dornbirn	2022–23	2. Liga	14	10	—		3	5	—		—		17	15
Seoul E-Land	2023	K League 2	0	0	—		—		—		—		0	0
FC Dornbirn	2023–24	2. Liga	6	2	—		—		—		—		6	2
Schwarz-Weiß Bregenz	2024–25	2. Liga	14	9	—		2	1	—		—		16	10
Portuguesa	2025	Série D	0	0	11	3	0	0	—		—		11	3
Athletico Paranaense	2025	Série B	22	8	—		5	0	—		—		27	8
Athletico Paranaense	2026	Série A	11	0	4	0	1	0	—		—		16	0
Athletico Paranaense	Total		33	8	4	0	6	0	—		—		43	8
Career total			93	53	17	3	12	8	0	0	1	0	122	64

== Honours ==
São Caetano

- Copa Paulista: 2019
