= Alysson Dutra =

Brazilian footballer

Personal information
- Full name: Alysson Ademir Dutra Paulino
- Date of birth: 10 September 1999 (age 27)
- Place of birth: Belo Horizonte, Brazil
- Height: 1.89 m (6 ft 2 in)
- Position: Centre-back

Team information
- Current team: Camboriú (on loan from Rio Claro)

Youth career
- 2016–2019: Atlético Goianiense

Senior career*
Years	Team	Apps	(Gls)
2019–	Rio Claro	62	(4)
2020	→ União Barbarense (loan)	3	(0)
2021	→ São Bento (loan)	10	(0)
2022	→ ASA (loan)	15	(0)
2023	→ Ferroviária (loan)	12	(0)
2024–2025	→ Inter de Limeira (loan)	14	(0)
2025	→ Portuguesa (loan)	2	(0)
2026–	→ Camboriú (loan)	3	(2)
- * Club domestic league appearances and goals as of 18:28, 16 June 2025 (UTC)

Alysson Ademir Dutra Paulino (born 10 September 1999), known as Alysson Dutra or just Alysson, is a Brazilian footballer who plays for Camboriú, on loan from Rio Claro. Mainly a centre-back, he can also play a left-back.

== Career ==
Born in Belo Horizonte, Minas Gerais, Alysson represented Atlético Goianiense as a youth, before signing for Rio Claro ahead of the 2019 Copa Paulista. After making his senior debut, he was loaned to União Barbarense in 2020.

On 2 June 2021, Alysson was announced at São Bento on loan. After being back at Rio Claro in the 2022 Campeonato Paulista Série A2, he moved to ASA also in a temporary deal on 25 April 2022.

Back at Rio Claro ahead of the 2023 campaign, Alysson was loaned to Ferroviária on 3 May of that year. He returned to his parent club after helping the side to achieve promotion from the Série D, and was announced at Inter de Limeira also on loan on 11 April 2024.

On 15 March 2025, Alysson left Inter after suffering relegation from the 2025 Campeonato Paulista. On 10 April, he moved to Portuguesa on loan for one year.

== Career statistics ==
As of 22 January 2026

Club	Season	League			State League		Cup		Continental		Other		Total	
Club	Season	Division	Apps	Goals	Apps	Goals	Apps	Goals	Apps	Goals	Apps	Goals	Apps	Goals
Portuguesa Santista	2019	Paulista A2	—		—		—		—		5 (Note: Appearance(s) in Copa Paulista)	0	5	0
Portuguesa Santista	2020	Paulista A2	—		11	1	—		—		—		11	1
Portuguesa Santista	2021	Paulista A2	—		10	0	—		—		6	0	16	0
Portuguesa Santista	2022	Paulista A2	—		17	0	—		—		—		17	0
Portuguesa Santista	2023	Paulista A2	—		11	2	—		—		—		11	2
Portuguesa Santista	2024	Paulista A2	—		13	1	—		—		—		13	1
Portuguesa Santista	Total		—		62	4	—		—		11	0	73	4
União Barbarense (loan)	2020	Paulista 2ª Divisão	—		3	0	—		—		—		3	0
São Bento (loan)	2021	Série D	10	0	—		—		—		—		10	0
ASA (loan)	2022	Série D	15	0	—		—		—		—		15	0
Ferroviária (loan)	2023	Série D	12	0	—		—		—		—		12	0
Inter de Limeira (loan)	2024	Série D	9	0	—		—		—		—		9	0
Inter de Limeira (loan)	2025	Série D	0	0	5	0	1	0	—		—		6	0
Inter de Limeira (loan)	Total		9	0	5	0	1	0	—		—		15	0
Portuguesa (loan)	2025	Série D	2	0	—		—		—		—		2	0
Camboriú (loan)	2026	Catarinense	—		3	2	—		—		—		3	2
Career total			48	0	73	6	1	0	0	0	11	0	133	6
