= Robson (footballer, born April 1993) =

Brazilian footballer

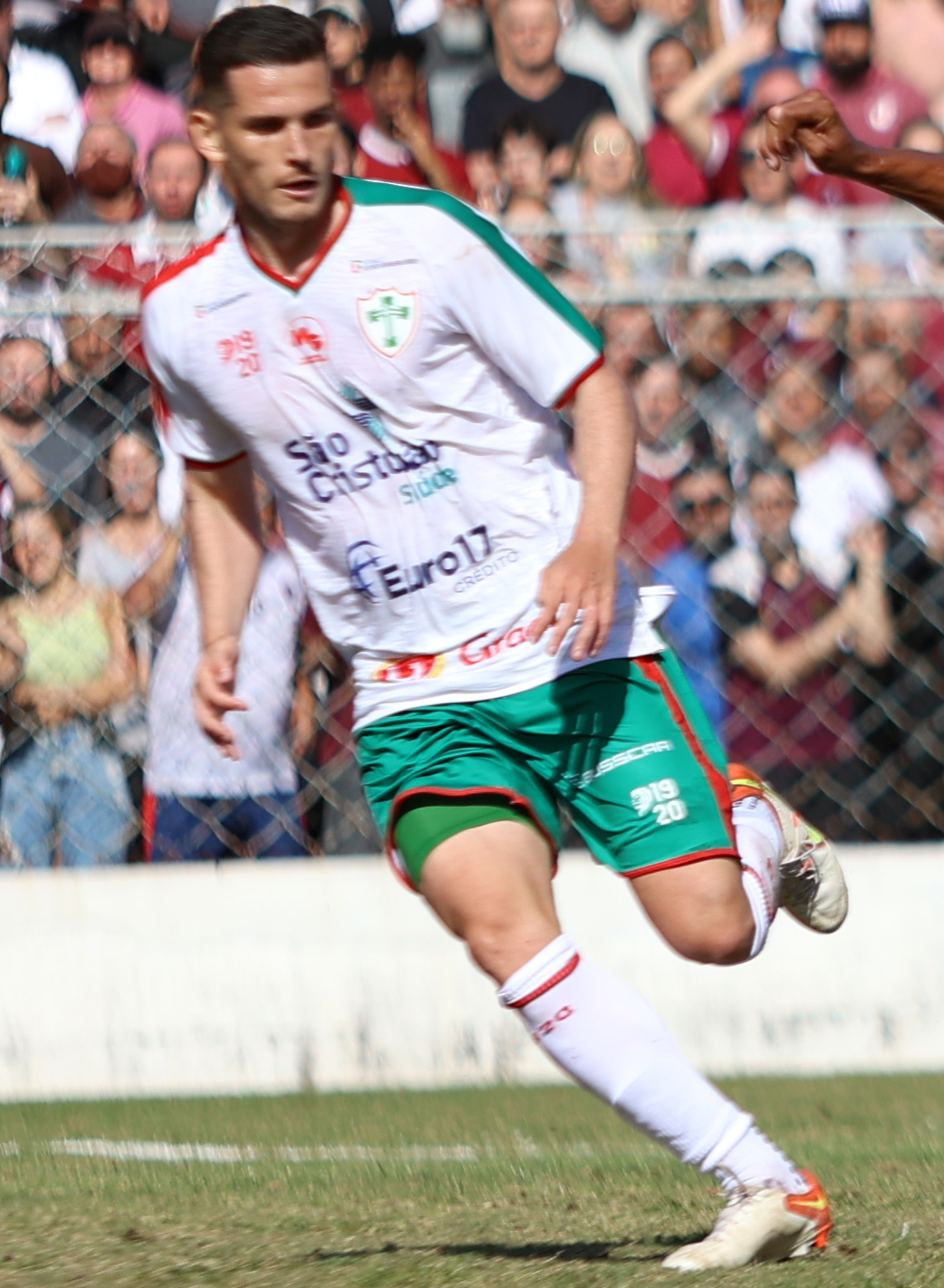
- Robson with Portuguesa in 2022

Personal information
- Full name: Robson Ernandes da Silva Junior
- Date of birth: 6 April 1993 (age 33)
- Place of birth: São Bernardo do Campo, Brazil
- Height: 1.85 m (6 ft 1 in)
- Position: Centre-back

Team information
- Current team: Inter de Limeira
- Number: 30

Youth career
- Portuguesa (futsal)
- 2007–2009: São Caetano
- 2010–2011: Red Bull Brasil
- 2011–2012: São Caetano
- 2012–2013: Mirassol

Senior career*
Years	Team	Apps	(Gls)
2014	União Suzano	2	(0)
2014	Taubaté	0	(0)
2015	São José dos Campos	19	(2)
2015–2016	Manthiqueira	18	(1)
2016–2017	Othellos Athienou	25	(0)
2018–2020	Juventus-SP	32	(0)
2020	Água Santa	0	(0)
2021	Pouso Alegre	9	(0)
2021–2022	XV de Piracicaba	14	(0)
2022–2025	Portuguesa	16	(0)
2024	→ Confiança (loan)	9	(0)
2026–	Inter de Limeira	14	(1)
- * Club domestic league appearances and goals as of 9 November 2026

Robson Ernandes da Silva Junior (born 6 April 1993), simply known as Robson, is a Brazilian footballer who plays as a centre-back for Inter de Limeira.

== Club career ==
Born in São Bernardo do Campo, São Paulo, Robson represented São Caetano, Red Bull Brasil and Mirassol as a youth. After leaving the latter in the end of 2013, he joined União Suzano, and made his senior debut during the 2014 Campeonato Paulista Segunda Divisão.

Robson moved to Taubaté for the 2014 Copa Paulista, but signed for São José dos Campos ahead of the 2015 season. He was a regular starter for the latter, notably scoring in a city derby against São José EC.

On 21 August 2015, Robson was announced at Manthiqueira for the latter stages of the Paulista Segunda Divisão. He remained for the 2016 season, but left in June to join Cypriot Second Division side Othellos Athienou, on a two-year deal.

Robson returned to Brazil ahead of the 2018 campaign, and agreed to a contract with Juventus-SP. On 30 September 2020, he moved to Água Santa for the Copa Paulista.

Robson left Água Santa on 23 December 2020, after not renewing his contract, and signed for Pouso Alegre for the 2021 Campeonato Mineiro. He returned to his native state on 19 July 2021, after joining XV de Piracicaba.

On 1 July 2022, Robson was announced as the new signing of Portuguesa. On 26 October, he renewed his contract until the end of the 2023 Campeonato Paulista.

On 4 April 2023, after becoming a regular starter for Lusa, Robson extended his contract for a further year. After another contract extension, he was loaned to Série C side Confiança for the remainder of the season on 23 April 2024.

== Career statistics ==
As of 22 January 2026

Club	Season	League			State League		Cup		Continental		Other		Total	
Club	Season	Division	Apps	Goals	Apps	Goals	Apps	Goals	Apps	Goals	Apps	Goals	Apps	Goals
União Suzano	2014	Paulista 2ª Divisão	—		2	0	—		—		—		2	0
Taubaté	2014	Paulista A3	—		0	0	—		—		9 (Note: Appearance(s) in Copa Paulista)	0	9	0
São José dos Campos	2015	Paulista A3	—		11	2	—		—		—		11	2
Manthiqueira	2015	Paulista 2ª Divisão	—		6	0	—		—		—		6	0
Manthiqueira	2016	Paulista 2ª Divisão	—		12	1	—		—		—		12	1
Manthiqueira	Total		—		18	1	—		—		—		18	1
Othellos Athienou	2016–17	Cypriot Second Division	25	0	—		—		—		—		25	0
Juventus-SP	2018	Paulista A2	—		6	0	—		—		16	0	22	0
Juventus-SP	2019	Paulista A2	—		14	0	—		—		15	0	29	0
Juventus-SP	2020	Paulista A2	—		12	0	—		—		—		12	0
Juventus-SP	Total		—		32	0	—		—		31	0	63	0
Água Santa	2020	Paulista	—		0	0	—		—		10	0	10	0
Pouso Alegre	2021	Mineiro	—		9	0	—		—		—		9	0
XV de Piracicaba	2021	Paulista A2	—		0	0	—		—		2	0	2	0
XV de Piracicaba	2022	Paulista A2	—		14	0	—		—		—		14	0
XV de Piracicaba	Total		—		14	0	—		—		2	0	16	0
Portuguesa	2022	Paulista A2	—		0	0	—		—		10	1	10	1
Portuguesa	2023	Paulista	—		6	0	—		—		11	0	17	0
Portuguesa	2024	Paulista	—		7	0	—		—		0	0	7	0
Portuguesa	2025	Série D	2	0	1	0	0	0	—		—		3	0
Portuguesa	Total		2	0	14	0	0	0	—		21	1	37	1
Confiança (loan)	2024	Série C	9	0	—		—		—		—		9	0
Inter de Limeira	2026	Série C	0	0	1	0	—		—		—		1	0
Career total			36	0	101	3	0	0	0	0	73	1	210	4

== Honours ==
Portuguesa

- Campeonato Paulista Série A2: 2022
