= Tauã (footballer, born 1995) =

Brazilian footballer

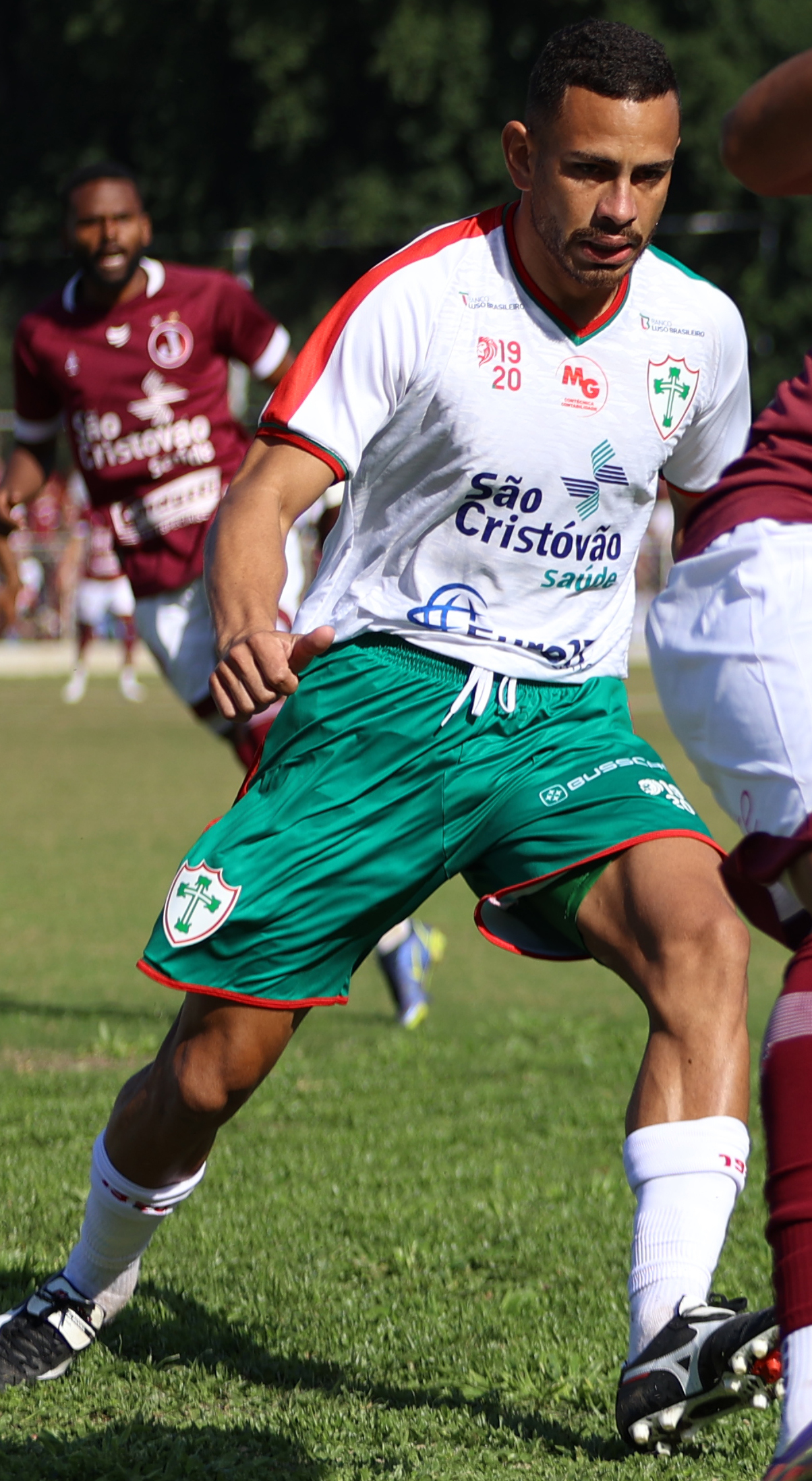
- Tauã with Portuguesa in 2022

Personal information
- Full name: Tauã Antunes
- Date of birth: 24 February 1995 (age 31)
- Place of birth: Caraguatatuba, Brazil
- Height: 1.76 m (5 ft 9 in)
- Position: Midfielder

Team information
- Current team: Noroeste

Youth career
- 2014–2015: São José dos Campos

Senior career*
Years	Team	Apps	(Gls)
2016	Lemense	11	(0)
2017–2018	EC São Bernardo	29	(2)
2018	São José-SP	20	(0)
2019	Comercial-SP	6	(0)
2020	Portuguesa Santista	11	(0)
2020	Boa Esporte	8	(0)
2021	Água Santa	18	(0)
2021–2025	Portuguesa	70	(1)
2024	→ Londrina (loan)	23	(0)
2025	→ Caxias (loan)	4	(0)
2026–	Noroeste	0	(0)
- * Club domestic league appearances and goals as of 15:31, 4 November 2025 (UTC)

Tauã Antunes (born 24 February 1995), simply known as Tauã, is a Brazilian footballer who plays as a midfielder for Noroeste.

== Club career ==
Born in Caraguatatuba, São Paulo, Tauã was a São José dos Campos FC youth graduate. He made his senior debut with Lemense in the 2016 Campeonato Paulista Segunda Divisão, and moved to EC São Bernardo in the following year.

After helping in São Bernardo's promotion to the Campeonato Paulista Série A3, Tauã joined São José-SP for the 2018 Segundona. On 10 January 2019, he was presented at Comercial-SP.

On 11 November 2019, Tauã agreed to a contract with Portuguesa Santista. The following 13 August, he moved to Série C side Boa Esporte.

On 15 January 2021, Tauã was announced at Água Santa. On 15 June, he signed for Portuguesa, and lifted the Campeonato Paulista Série A2 with the latter in 2022.

On 15 April 2024, Tauã was announced at third division side Londrina, on loan until the end of the year. Back to Lusa for the 2025 season, he was regularly used before being loaned out to Caxias also in division three on 20 August of that year.

Upon returning, Tauã rescinded with Portuguesa on 4 November 2025.

== Career statistics ==
As of 4 November 2025

Club	Season	League			State league		Cup		Continental		Other		Total	
Club	Season	Division	Apps	Goals	Apps	Goals	Apps	Goals	Apps	Goals	Apps	Goals	Apps	Goals
Lemense	2016	Paulista 2ª Divisão	—		11	0	—		—		—		11	0
EC São Bernardo	2017	Paulista 2ª Divisão	—		16	1	—		—		—		16	1
EC São Bernardo	2018	Paulista A3	—		13	1	—		—		—		13	1
EC São Bernardo	Total		—		29	2	—		—		—		29	2
São José-SP	2018	Paulista 2ª Divisão	—		20	0	—		—		—		20	0
Comercial-SP	2019	Paulista A3	—		6	0	—		—		18 (Note: Appearance(s) in Copa Paulista)	0	24	0
Portuguesa Santista	2020	Paulista A2	—		11	0	—		—		—		11	0
Boa Esporte	2020	Série C	8	0	—		—		—		—		8	0
Água Santa	2021	Paulista A2	—		0	0	—		—		—		10	0
Portuguesa	2021	Série D	10	0	—		—		—		11	0	21	0
Portuguesa	2022	Paulista A2	—		20	0	—		—		13	0	33	0
Portuguesa	2023	Paulista	—		11	0	—		—		11	0	22	0
Portuguesa	2024	Paulista	—		6	0	—		—		—		6	0
Portuguesa	2025	Série D	12	1	11	0	1	0	—		—		24	1
Portuguesa	Total		22	1	48	0	1	0	—		35	0	106	1
Londrina (loan)	2024	Série C	23	0	—		—		—		—		23	0
Caxias (loan)	2025	Série C	4	0	—		—		—		—		4	0
Career total			57	1	119	2	1	0	0	0	53	0	230	3

== Honours ==
Portuguesa

- Campeonato Paulista Série A2: 2022
