= Denis (footballer, born 2004) =

Brazilian footballer

Personal information
- Full name: Denis Alves Borges
- Date of birth: 8 January 2004 (age 22)
- Place of birth: São Bernardo do Campo, Brazil
- Height: 1.79 m (5 ft 10 in)
- Position: Midfielder

Youth career
- São Caetano
- 2018–2019: EC São Bernardo
- 2019–2020: Flamengo
- 2021: Ponte Preta
- 2022: EC São Bernardo
- 2022–2025: Portuguesa
- 2024–2025: → Internacional (loan)

Senior career*
Years	Team	Apps	(Gls)
2023–2026	Portuguesa	25	(1)
2024–2025	→ Internacional (loan)	0	(0)
- * Club domestic league appearances and goals as of 14:47, 3 August 2026 (UTC)

Denis Alves Borges (born 8 January 2004), simply known as Denis, is a Brazilian footballer who plays as a midfielder.

== Career ==
Born in São Bernardo do Campo, São Paulo, Denis began his career with São Caetano, and subsequently played for EC São Bernardo before joining the youth sides of Flamengo in 2019. After leaving the club in the following year, he spent the 2021 season at Ponte Preta before returning to São Bernardo in 2022.

On 13 July 2022, Denis was announced at Portuguesa and was initially assigned to the under-20 squad. He made his first team debut on 1 July 2023, coming on as a second-half substitute for Luiz Felipe in a 4–0 home routing of Santo André, for the year's Copa Paulista.

Denis played three more matches during the tournament, as Lusa were knocked out in the quarterfinals. After going back to the under-20s for the 2024 Copa São Paulo de Futebol Júnior, he made his first appearance of the season with the main squad on 7 February, replacing Zé Ricardo late into a 1–0 Campeonato Paulista away loss to São Bernardo FC.

On 3 July 2024, Denis was loaned to Série A side Internacional until the following January. He returned to his parent club after only featuring for the under-20 and under-23 squads.

Denis scored his first senior goal on 26 July 2025, netting Lusa's third in a 3–0 home win over Boavista. On 12 December, he renewed his contract until September of the following year.

On 25 August 2026, Denis rescinded his link with Portuguesa.

== Personal life ==
Denis' older brother Denilson is also a footballer and a midfielder, who plays for Cuiabá.

== Career statistics ==
As of 3 August 2026

Club	Season	League			State League		Cup		Continental		Other		Total	
Club	Season	Division	Apps	Goals	Apps	Goals	Apps	Goals	Apps	Goals	Apps	Goals	Apps	Goals
Portuguesa	2023	Paulista	—		0	0	—		—		4 (Note: Appearance(s) in Copa Paulista)	0	4	0
Portuguesa	2024	Paulista	—		3	0	—		—		2	0	5	0
Portuguesa	2025	Série D	5	1	2	0	0	0	—		—		7	1
Portuguesa	2026	Série D	11	0	4	0	3	0	—		—		18	0
Portuguesa	Total		16	1	9	0	3	0	—		6	0	34	1
Internacional (loan)	2024	Série A	0	0	—		—		—		3 (Note: Appearance(s) in Copa FGF)	0	3	0
Career total			16	1	9	0	3	0	0	0	9	0	37	1
