= Matheus Leal =

Brazilian footballer

Personal information
- Full name: Matheus Philipe Pereira Leal
- Date of birth: 7 January 1995 (age 31)
- Place of birth: Três Marias, Brazil
- Height: 1.82 m (6 ft 0 in)
- Position: Left-back

Team information
- Current team: Juventus-SP
- Number: 16

Youth career
- Goiás
- 2014–2015: Independente de Limeira

Senior career*
Years	Team	Apps	(Gls)
2016	Independente de Limeira	11	(0)
2016–2017	Real Massamá	27	(5)
2017–2019	Benfica B	3	(0)
2018	→ Real Massamá (loan)	6	(0)
2019	Leixões	0	(0)
2020–2021	Portuguesa Santista	20	(0)
2022	Atlético Alagoinhas	19	(0)
2022–2023	Aparecidense	28	(1)
2024	Botafogo-PB	1	(0)
2024	Cascavel	11	(0)
2025	Betim	9	(0)
2025	Portuguesa	12	(0)
2025	Londrina	4	(0)
2026–	Juventus-SP	17	(0)
- * Club domestic league appearances and goals as of 16:24, 22 April 2026 (UTC)

Matheus Philipe Pereira Leal (born 7 January 1995), known as Matheus Leal, is a Brazilian footballer who plays as a left-back for Juventus-SP.

== Career ==
Born in Três Marias, Minas Gerais, Matheus Leal played for Goiás and Independente de Limeira as a youth, before being promoted to the latter's first team in December 2015. After making his senior debut in the 2016 Campeonato Paulista Série A2, he moved abroad and joined Campeonato de Portugal side Real Massamá.

In June 2017, after helping Real in their first-ever promotion to the Segunda Liga as champions, Matheus Leal signed for Benfica, being assigned to the B-team also in the second division. On 5 January of the following year, after being rarely used, he returned to Real on loan.

On 10 July 2019, after only playing for Benfica's under-23 side, Matheus Leal agreed to a three-year contract with Leixões. In December, however, after making no appearances, he returned to his home country and joined Portuguesa Santista.

Matheus Leal moved to Atlético Alagoinhas ahead of the 2022 season, and helped the club to win the 2022 Campeonato Baiano before signing for Aparecidense on 23 June of that year. He became a regular starter in 2023, being the main subject of a legal action from Manaus FC, after the club alleged he was lined up irregularly in the 15th round of the 2023 Série C; STJD ruled out Manaus' report and kept Aparecidense in the third division afterwards.

On 3 November 2023, Matheus Leal signed for Botafogo-PB, but had his contract rescinded the following 8 February, after just two matches. Seven days later, he was announced at FC Cascavel.

On 22 November 2024, Matheus Leal was announced at Betim for the upcoming season. On 27 March of the following year, he signed a one-year contract with Portuguesa, but rescinded his link on 1 September and joined Londrina immediately after.

On 1 December 2025, Leal was announced at Juventus-SP for the ensuing campaign.

== Career statistics ==
As of match played 22 September 2026

Appearances and goals by club, season and competition
Club	Season	League			State League		Cup		Continental		Other		Total	
Club	Season	Division	Apps	Goals	Apps	Goals	Apps	Goals	Apps	Goals	Apps	Goals	Apps	Goals
Independente de Limeira	2016	Paulista A2	—		11	0	—		—		—		11	0
Real S.C.	2016–17	Campeonato de Portugal	27	5	—		3	0	—		—		30	5
Benfica B	2017–18	LigaPro	3	0	—		—		—		—		3	0
Benfica B	2018–19	LigaPro	0	0	—		—		—		—		0	0
Benfica B	Total		3	0	—		—		—		—		3	0
Real S.C. (loan)	2017–18	LigaPro	6	0	—		—		—		—		6	0
Leixões	2019–20	LigaPro	0	0	—		0	0	—		—		0	0
Portuguesa Santista	2020	Paulista A2	—		9	0	—		—		7 (Note: Appearance(s) in Copa Paulista)	0	16	0
Portuguesa Santista	2021	Paulista A2	—		11	0	—		—		—		11	0
Portuguesa Santista	Total		—		20	0	—		—		7	0	27	0
Atlético Alagoinhas	2022	Série D	9	0	10	0	1	0	—		8 (Note: Appearance(s) in Copa do Nordeste)	0	28	0
Aparecidense	2022	Série C	3	0	—		—		—		—		3	0
Aparecidense	2023	Série C	13	1	12	0	—		—		—		25	1
Aparecidense	Total		16	1	12	0	—		—		—		28	1
Botafogo-PB	2024	Série C	0	0	1	0	—		—		1	0	2	0
Cascavel	2024	Série D	6	0	—		—		—		—		6	0
Betim	2025	Mineiro	—		9	0	—		—		—		9	0
Portuguesa	2025	Série D	12	0	—		—		—		—		12	0
Londrina	2025	Série C	4	0	—		—		—		—		4	0
Juventus-SP	2026	Paulista A2	—		20	0	—		—		7	0	27	0
Career total			83	6	83	0	4	0	0	0	23	0	193	6

== Honours ==
Real Massamá

- Campeonato de Portugal: 2016–17

Atlético Alagoinhas

- Campeonato Baiano: 2022

Juventus-SP

- Campeonato Paulista Série A2: 2026
