= Pedro Henrique (footballer, born 2003) =

Brazilian footballer

Personal information
- Full name: Pedro Henrique da Silva Ferreira
- Date of birth: 9 December 2003 (age 22)
- Place of birth: São Paulo, Brazil
- Height: 1.78 m (5 ft 10 in)
- Position: Left-back

Team information
- Current team: Betim

Youth career
- 2016–2017: União Mogi
- 2018: Nacional-SP
- 2019–2022: Flamengo-SP
- 2023–2024: Portuguesa

Senior career*
Years	Team	Apps	(Gls)
2022	Flamengo-SP	1	(0)
2024–2025	Portuguesa	21	(0)
2026–	Betim	12	(1)
- * Club domestic league appearances and goals as of 20:52, 26 April 2026 (UTC)

Pedro Henrique da Silva Ferreira (born 9 December 2003), known as Pedro Henrique, is a Brazilian footballer who plays as a left-back for Betim.

== Career ==
Born in São Paulo, Pedro Henrique began his career with União Mogi, before representing the youth sides of Nacional-SP and Flamengo-SP. He was promoted to the first team in April 2022 for the year's Campeonato Paulista Segunda Divisão, and made his senior debut with the latter on 24 April, coming on as a late substitute in a 1–1 away draw against former side União Mogi.

After returning to the youth setup of Flamengo, Pedro Henrique moved to Portuguesa ahead of the 2023 season, and was assigned to the under-20 squad. After playing in the 2024 Copa São Paulo de Futebol Júnior, he made his first team debut on 28 February of that year, replacing Eduardo Diniz in a 2–0 Campeonato Paulista home loss to Palmeiras.

A backup option in the 2024 Paulistão, Pedro Henrique became an undisputed starter in the year's Copa Paulista. He left the club at the end of the 2025 season as his contract expired, and subsequently signed for Betim.

== Career statistics ==
As of 26 April 2026

Club	Season	League			State League		Cup		Continental		Other		Total	
Club	Season	Division	Apps	Goals	Apps	Goals	Apps	Goals	Apps	Goals	Apps	Goals	Apps	Goals
Flamengo-SP	2022	Paulista 2ª Divisão	—		1	0	—		—		—		1	0
Portuguesa	2024	Paulista	—		4	0	—		—		15 (Note: Appearance(s) in Copa Paulista)	0	19	0
Portuguesa	2025	Série D	9	0	8	0	1	0	—		—		18	0
Portuguesa	Total		9	0	12	0	1	0	—		15	0	37	0
Betim	2026	Série D	4	1	8	0	2	0	—		—		14	1
Career total			13	1	21	0	3	0	0	0	15	0	52	0
