= Barba (footballer) =

Brazilian footballer (born 1999)

Personal information
- Full name: João Pedro de Giuli
- Date of birth: 29 January 1999 (age 27)
- Place of birth: São José do Rio Preto, Brazil
- Height: 1.77 m (5 ft 10 in)
- Position: Defensive midfielder

Team information
- Current team: Barra-SC

Youth career
- 2011–2016: Internacional
- 2017–2019: Novorizontino

Senior career*
| Years | Team | Apps | (Gls) |
| 2018–2024 | Novorizontino | 82 | (1) |
| 2023 | → Figueirense (loan) | 13 | (0) |
| 2024 | → Caxias (loan) | 21 | (0) |
| 2025 | Portuguesa | 20 | (0) |
| 2026– | Barra-SC | 2 | (0) |
- * Club domestic league appearances and goals as of 11 November 2026

João Pedro de Giuli (born 29 January 1999), commonly known as Barba, is a Brazilian footballer who plays as a defensive midfielder for Barra-SC.

== Career ==
Born in São José do Rio Preto but raised in Mirassolândia, both in the São Paulo, Barba moved to Porto Alegre at the age of 12 to join Internacional's youth sides. He left the club at the age of 17, and subsequently moved to Novorizontino; known as João Pedro at the time, he was nicknamed Barba due to his beard, as other two players in the squad had the same name as him.

Barba made his first team debut in the 2018 Copa Paulista, but later returned to the under-20 squad for the following season. He started to feature regularly in the first team during the 2020 season onwards, taking part of the club's consecutive promotions (from the Série D to the Série B).

Barba's playing stime started to decrease in 2022, and he moved to Figueirense on loan on 22 May 2023. On 28 November, he was announced at Caxias also in a temporary deal.

On 12 December 2024, Barba agreed to a deal with Portuguesa.

== Career statistics ==
As of 11 August 2025

| Club | Season | League | | | State League | | Cup | | Continental | | Other | | Total | |
| Club | Season | Division | Apps | Goals | Apps | Goals | Apps | Goals | Apps | Goals | Apps | Goals | Apps | Goals |
|---|---|---|---|---|---|---|---|---|---|---|---|---|---|---|
| Novorizontino | 2018 | Série D | 0 | 0 | — | | — | | — | | 15 (Note: Appearance(s) in Copa Paulista) | 0 | 15 | 0 |
| Novorizontino | 2019 | Série D | 0 | 0 | 0 | 0 | — | | — | | — | | 0 | 0 |
| Novorizontino | 2020 | Série D | 17 | 0 | 6 | 0 | 1 | 0 | — | | — | | 24 | 0 |
| Novorizontino | 2021 | Série C | 19 | 0 | 14 | 1 | — | | — | | — | | 33 | 1 |
| Novorizontino | 2022 | Série B | 10 | 0 | 11 | 0 | 1 | 0 | — | | — | | 22 | 0 |
| Novorizontino | 2023 | Série B | 0 | 0 | 5 | 0 | — | | — | | — | | 5 | 0 |
| Novorizontino | Total | | 46 | 0 | 36 | 1 | 2 | 0 | — | | 15 | 0 | 99 | 1 |
| Figueirense (loan) | 2023 | Série C | 13 | 0 | — | | — | | — | | 5 (Note: Appearance(s) in Copa Santa Catarina) | 0 | 18 | 0 |
| Caxias | 2024 | Série C | 12 | 0 | 9 | 0 | 2 | 0 | — | | — | | 23 | 0 |
| Portuguesa | 2025 | Série D | 14 | 0 | 6 | 0 | 1 | 0 | — | | — | | 21 | 0 |
| Barra-SC | 2026 | Série C | 0 | 0 | 0 | 0 | 0 | 0 | — | | — | | 0 | 0 |
| Career total | | | 85 | 0 | 51 | 1 | 5 | 0 | 0 | 0 | 20 | 0 | 161 | 1 |
