= Deivid Santos =

Brazilian footballer

Personal information
- Full name: Deivid da Silva Santos
- Date of birth: 19 December 2004 (age 21)
- Place of birth: São Paulo, Brazil
- Height: 1.76 m (5 ft 9 in)
- Position: Forward

Team information
- Current team: Grêmio Prudente

Youth career
- Taboão da Serra
- 2019: Independente de Limeira
- 2020–2022: São Paulo
- 2023–2025: Portuguesa

Senior career*
Years	Team	Apps	(Gls)
2024–2025	Portuguesa	1	(0)
2025–	Grêmio Prudente	0	(0)
- * Club domestic league appearances and goals as of 20:02, 10 June 2025 (UTC)

Deivid da Silva Santos (born 19 December 2004), known as Deivid Santos or just Deivid, is a Brazilian footballer who plays as a forward for Grêmio Prudente.

== Career ==
Deivid was born in São Paulo, and joined São Paulo FC's youth sides in 2020, after representing Independente de Limeira and Taboão da Serra. In May 2022, he signed his first professional contract with the former.

In 2023, Deivid moved to the under-20 side of Portuguesa, after being released by São Paulo; Tricolor also retained 30% of the player's economic rights. In May 2024, he was promoted to the first team for the 2024 Copa Paulista, making his senior debut on 15 June of that year by coming on as a late substitute for Fabricio in a 1–1 away draw against Juventus.

Back to the under-20s for the 2025 Copa São Paulo de Futebol Júnior, Deivid subsequently returned to the main squad and appeared in a 1–1 home draw against Botafogo-PB on 27 February, for the year's Copa do Brasil. On 5 July, he left the club to join Grêmio Prudente.

== Career statistics ==
As of 25 July 2025

Club	Season	League			State League		Cup		Continental		Other		Total	
Club	Season	Division	Apps	Goals	Apps	Goals	Apps	Goals	Apps	Goals	Apps	Goals	Apps	Goals
Portuguesa	2024	Paulista	—		—		—		—		4 (Note: Appearance(s) in Copa Paulista)	0	4	0
Portuguesa	2025	Série D	1	0	0	0	1	0	—		—		2	0
Portuguesa	Total		1	0	0	0	1	0	—		4	0	6	0
Grêmio Prudente	2025	Paulista A2	—		—		—		—		2	0	2	0
Career total			1	0	0	0	1	0	0	0	6	0	8	0
