= Maurício (footballer, born 1994) =

Brazilian footballer

Personal information
- Full name: Maurício de Oliveira Moraes
- Date of birth: 4 February 1994 (age 32)
- Place of birth: Registro, Brazil
- Height: 1.84 m (6 ft 0 in)
- Position: Centre-back

Team information
- Current team: Shan United

Youth career
- 2011: Guarujá
- 2012: Atlético Sorocaba
- 2013–2014: Audax
- 2013–2014: → Ponte Preta (loan)

Senior career*
Years	Team	Apps	(Gls)
2013–2018	Audax	16	(0)
2013–2014	→ Ponte Preta (loan)	1	(0)
2015	→ Grêmio Osasco (loan)	17	(0)
2016	→ Oeste (loan)	4	(0)
2017	→ Grêmio Osasco (loan)	18	(1)
2018	Audax Rio	18	(0)
2019	América de Natal	4	(0)
2019	URT	2	(0)
2019	Ferroviária	0	(0)
2020	Taubaté	10	(0)
2020	Ferroviária	0	(0)
2021	Pelotas	8	(1)
2021	Juventus Jaraguá	14	(1)
2022	Juventus-SP	8	(0)
2022	Marcílio Dias	12	(1)
2023	Manaus	6	(0)
2024	Juazeirense	9	(0)
2024	Brasil de Pelotas	12	(1)
2024–2025	Portuguesa	4	(0)
2025–	Shan United	0	(0)
- * Club domestic league appearances and goals as of 19:26, 24 February 2025 (UTC)

Maurício de Oliveira Moraes (born 4 February 1994), simply known as Maurício, is a Brazilian footballer who plays as a centre-back for Burmese club Shan United.

== Career ==
Born in Registro, São Paulo, Maurício represented Guarujá, Atlético Sorocaba, Audax and Ponte Preta. He made his first team – and Série A – debut on 8 December 2013, starting in a 0–0 away draw against Internacional, as his club was already relegated.

Maurício returned to his parent club Audax in 2014, and subsequently also represented affiliated clubs Grêmio Osasco and Audax Rio. In 2016, he moved to Série B side Oeste, after a partnership between the club and Audax was established, but featured rarely.

In January 2017, Maurício was close to a move to Portuguesa, but the deal fell through due to financial reasons. On 21 December 2018, he was announced at América de Natal.

On 27 August 2019, after a short spell at URT, Maurício signed for Ferroviária. He moved to Taubaté for the 2020 season, before agreeing to a deal with Marília in October; shortly after, however, he returned to AFE.

In the following two years, Maurício played for Pelotas, Juventus Jaraguá, Juventus-SP and Marcílio Dias. On 17 November 2022, he was announced at Manaus FC.

Maurício started the 2024 campaign at Juazeirense, but left the club on 23 April. On 7 June, he was announced at Brasil de Pelotas.

On 26 August 2024, Maurício was announced at Lusa for the Copa Paulista. On 9 December, he renewed his contract with the club for a further year.

== Career statistics ==
As of 24 February 2025

Club	Season	League			State League		Cup		Continental		Other		Total	
Club	Season	Division	Apps	Goals	Apps	Goals	Apps	Goals	Apps	Goals	Apps	Goals	Apps	Goals
Ponte Preta	2013	Série A	1	0	—		—		—		—		1	0
Audax	2015	Paulista	—		—		—		—		11 (Note: Appearance(s) in Copa Paulista)	0	11	0
Audax	2016	Série D	0	0	1	0	—		—		—		1	0
Audax	2017	Série D	4	0	—		—		—		3	0	7	0
Audax	2018	Paulista A2	—		11	0	—		—		—		11	0
Audax	Total		4	0	12	0	—		—		14	0	30	0
Grêmio Osasco (loan)	2015	Paulista A3	—		17	0	—		—		—		17	0
Oeste (loan)	2016	Série B	4	0	—		—		—		—		4	0
Grêmio Osasco (loan)	2017	Paulista A2	—		18	1	—		—		—		18	1
Audax Rio	2018	Carioca Série B1	—		18	0	—		—		2 (Note: Appearance(s) in Copa Rio)	0	20	0
América de Natal	2019	Série D	0	0	4	0	0	0	—		—		4	0
URT	2019	Série D	0	0	2	0	0	0	—		—		2	0
Ferroviária	2019	Série D	0	0	—		—		—		10	1	10	1
Taubaté	2020	Paulista A2	—		10	0	—		—		—		10	0
Ferroviária	2020	Série D	0	0	—		—		—		10	0	10	0
Pelotas	2021	Gaúcho	—		8	1	—		—		—		8	1
Juventus Jaraguá	2021	Série D	14	1	—		—		—		7 (Note: Appearance(s) in Copa Santa Catarina)	1	21	2
Juventus-SP	2022	Paulista A2	—		8	0	—		—		—		8	0
Marcílio Dias	2022	Série D	12	1	—		—		—		5	0	17	1
Manaus	2023	Série C	0	0	6	0	1	0	—		0	0	7	0
Juazeirense	2024	Série D	0	0	9	0	—		—		5 (Note: Appearance(s) in Copa do Nordeste)	0	14	0
Brasil de Pelotas	2024	Série D	12	1	—		—		—		—		12	1
Portuguesa	2024	Paulista	—		—		—		—		6	0	6	0
Portuguesa	2025	Série D	0	0	4	0	0	0	—		—		4	0
Portuguesa	Total		0	0	4	0	0	0	—		6	0	10	0
Career total			47	3	116	2	1	0	0	0	59	2	223	7
