= De Paula (footballer) =

Brazilian professional footballer

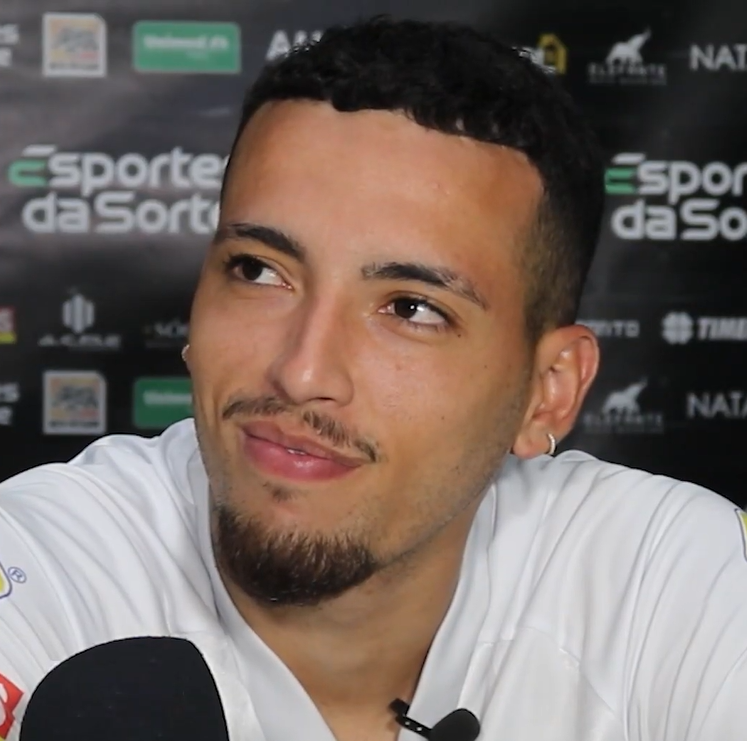
- De Paula during an interview as a player of ABC in 2023

Personal information
- Full name: Lucas Gonçalves de Paula
- Date of birth: 14 March 1999 (age 27)
- Place of birth: Caieiras, Brazil
- Height: 1.83 m (6 ft 0 in)
- Position: Forward

Youth career
- 2014–2015: Paulista
- 2016–2019: Nacional-SP

Senior career*
Years	Team	Apps	(Gls)
2019	Nacional-SP	2	(1)
2020–2022	Oeste	70	(5)
2022–2023	Hercílio Luz	8	(1)
2023	→ ABC (loan)	3	(0)
2023	Oeste	0	(0)
2024	Novo Hamburgo	7	(0)
2024	Grêmio Prudente	6	(3)
2024	→ Águia de Marabá (loan)	3	(0)
2025	Santa Catarina	13	(5)
2025–2026	Portuguesa	7	(0)
2026	→ Pouso Alegre (loan)	7	(0)
- * Club domestic league appearances and goals as of 13:51, 27 March 2026 (UTC)

Lucas Gonçalves de Paula (born 14 March 1999), known as De Paula, is a Brazilian professional footballer who plays as a forward.

== Career ==
Born in Caieiras, São Paulo, De Paula represented Paulista and Nacional-SP as a youth, and made his senior debut with the latter in 2019. He moved to Oeste in the following year, where he started to feature regularly in 2021.

In August 2022, De Paula was presented at Hercílio Luz for the year's Copa Santa Catarina. On 6 April of the following year, he was loaned to ABC in the Série B.

In July 2023, after featuring rarely at ABC, De Paula returned to Oeste for the Copa Paulista. On 17 November, he was announced at Novo Hamburgo for the 2024 Campeonato Gaúcho.

On 27 March 2024, De Paula moved to Grêmio Prudente, and helped in the club's promotion to the Campeonato Paulista Série A2 before joining Águia de Marabá on loan in April. He returned to Prudente for the Copa Paulista, before agreeing to a deal with Santa Catarina on 9 December.

De Paula was a regular starter for Santa Catarina in the 2025 Campeonato Catarinense, as the club reached the semifinals for the first time in their history. On 24 March of that year, he signed for Portuguesa.

On 6 January 2026, De Paula was loaned to Pouso Alegre for the Campeonato Mineiro.

== Career statistics ==
As of 27 March 2026

Club	Season	League			State league		Cup		Continental		Other		Total	
Club	Season	Division	Apps	Goals	Apps	Goals	Apps	Goals	Apps	Goals	Apps	Goals	Apps	Goals
Nacional-SP	2019	Paulista A2	—		2	1	—		—		4 (Note: Appearance(s) in Copa Paulista)	0	6	1
Oeste	2020	Série B	16	0	6	0	1	1	—		—		23	1
Oeste	2021	Série C	14	0	18	4	—		—		—		32	4
Oeste	2022	Série D	2	0	14	1	1	0	—		—		17	1
Oeste	Total		32	0	38	5	2	1	—		—		72	6
Hercílio Luz	2022	Catarinense	—		—		—		—		13 (Note: Appearance(s) in Copa Santa Catarina)	4	13	4
Hercílio Luz	2023	Série D	0	0	8	1	—		—		—		8	1
Hercílio Luz	Total		0	0	8	1	—		—		13	4	21	5
ABC (loan)	2023	Série B	3	0	0	0	0	0	—		—		3	0
Oeste	2023	Paulista A2	—		—		—		—		8	3	8	3
Novo Hamburgo	2024	Série D	0	0	7	0	—		—		—		7	0
Grêmio Prudente	2024	Paulista A3	—		6	3	—		—		8	1	14	4
Águia de Marabá (loan)	2024	Série D	3	0	—		—		—		—		3	0
Santa Catarina	2025	Catarinense	—		13	5	—		—		—		13	5
Portuguesa	2025	Série D	7	0	—		—		—		—		7	0
Pouso Alegre (loan)	2026	Série D	0	0	7	0	—		—		—		7	0
Career total			45	0	81	18	2	1	0	0	33	8	161	27
