= Franco (footballer, born 1993) =

Brazilian footballer (born 1993)

Personal information
- Full name: Franco de Paula Ferreira
- Date of birth: 27 January 1993 (age 33)
- Place of birth: Uberlândia, Brazil
- Height: 1.74 m (5 ft 9 in)
- Position: Midfielder

Youth career
- 2006–2011: Uberlândia
- 2010: → Cruzeiro (loan)
- 2013: Joinville

Senior career*
Years	Team	Apps	(Gls)
2010–2012	Uberlândia	1	(0)
2013–2015	Joinville	18	(0)
2015	Mogi Mirim	19	(1)
2016	Cabofriense	10	(3)
2016–2019	Rio Claro	49	(4)
2017	→ Macaé (loan)	10	(0)
2018	→ Maringá (loan)	0	(0)
2019	→ América de Natal (loan)	4	(0)
2020	FC Cascavel	12	(0)
2021	Uberlândia	17	(2)
2022	Velo Clube	16	(2)
2022	Pérolas Negras	20	(3)
2023	Velo Clube	15	(0)
2023–2024	Portuguesa Santista	16	(5)
2024–2025	São José-SP	13	(2)
2024–2025	→ Portuguesa (loan)	0	(0)
2025–2026	Portuguesa	0	(0)
- * Club domestic league appearances and goals as of 21:22, 6 August 2024 (UTC)

Franco de Paula Ferreira (born 27 January 1993), simply known as Franco, is a Brazilian footballer who plays as a midfielder.

== Career ==
Franco was born in Uberlândia, Minas Gerais, and began his career with hometown side Uberlândia EC. After making his senior debut at the age of 17 in 2010, he moved on loan to Cruzeiro.

After returning to Uberlândia, Franco joined Joinville in 2013, initially for the under-20s. After making his debut with the main squad in the Copa Santa Catarina, he featured in 12 matches in the 2014 Série B as the club achieved promotion as champions.

On 6 February 2015, Franco terminated his contract with JEC, and signed for Mogi Mirim five days later. On 31 May 2016, after a short period at Cabofriense, he moved to Rio Claro.

In the following three years, Franco served loans at Série C side Macaé Esporte and Série D sides Maringá and América de Natal. Ahead of the 2020 season, he agreed to a contract with FC Cascavel.

In December 2021, Franco was included in Velo Clube's squad for the upcoming campaign. On 26 October of the following year, after playing for Pérolas Negras, he returned to Velo.

On 2 June 2023, Franco joined Portuguesa Santista for the year's Copa Paulista. On 16 April 2024, after being a regular starter as the club won the state cup, he moved to São José-SP.

On 2 August 2024, Franco was loaned to Portuguesa for the remainder of the year. He only featured in three matches before suffering a knee injury, and had his contract extended on three occasions due to his absence.

== Career statistics ==
As of 15 November 2024

Club	Season	League			State League		Cup		Continental		Other		Total	
Club	Season	Division	Apps	Goals	Apps	Goals	Apps	Goals	Apps	Goals	Apps	Goals	Apps	Goals
Uberlândia	2010	Mineiro	—		1	0	—		—		—		1	0
Joinville	2014	Série B	12	0	6	0	0	0	—		—		18	0
Joinville	2015	Série A	0	0	0	0	0	0	—		—		0	0
Joinville	Total		12	0	6	0	0	0	—		—		18	0
Mogi Mirim	2015	Série B	15	1	4	0	—		—		—		19	1
Cabofriense	2016	Carioca	—		10	3	—		—		—		10	3
Rio Claro	2016	Paulista	—		—		—		—		15 (Note: Appearance(s) in Copa Paulista)	1	15	1
Rio Claro	2017	Paulista A2	—		19	0	—		—		—		19	0
Rio Claro	2018	Paulista A2	—		14	2	—		—		16	0	30	2
Rio Claro	2019	Paulista A2	—		16	2	—		—		8	1	24	3
Rio Claro	Total		—		49	4	—		—		39	2	88	6
Macaé (loan)	2017	Série C	10	0	—		—		—		1 (Note: Appearance(s) in Copa Rio)	0	11	0
Maringá (loan)	2018	Série D	0	0	—		—		—		—		0	0
América de Natal (loan)	2019	Série D	4	0	—		—		—		—		4	0
FC Cascavel	2020	Série D	9	0	3	0	—		—		—		12	0
Uberlândia	2021	Série D	8	1	9	1	1	0	—		—		18	2
Velo Clube	2022	Paulista A2	—		16	2	—		—		—		16	2
Pérolas Negras	2022	Série D	10	3	10	0	—		—		6	0	26	3
Velo Clube	2023	Paulista A2	—		15	0	—		—		—		15	0
Portuguesa Santista	2023	Paulista A2	—		—		—		—		15	8	15	8
Portuguesa Santista	2024	Paulista A2	—		16	5	1	0	—		—		17	5
Portuguesa Santista	Total		—		16	5	1	0	—		15	8	32	13
São José-SP	2024	Série D	13	2	—		—		—		—		13	2
Portuguesa (loan)	2024	Paulista	—		—		—		—		3	0	3	0
Career total			81	7	139	15	2	0	0	0	64	10	286	32

== Honours ==
Joinville

- Campeonato Brasileiro Série B: 2014

Portuguesa Santista

- Copa Paulista: 2023
