= Eliel (footballer, born 2001) =

Brazilian footballer

Personal information
- Full name: Eliel da Silva
- Date of birth: 16 November 2001 (age 24)
- Place of birth: Mogi Guaçu, Brazil
- Height: 1.72 m (5 ft 8 in)
- Position: Left-back

Team information
- Current team: Guarani

Youth career
- Guaçuano
- 2017–2018: Mogi Mirim
- 2019–2022: Guarani

Senior career*
Years	Team	Apps	(Gls)
2020–	Guarani	41	(0)
2024	→ Hercílio Luz (loan)	7	(0)
2024	→ Água Santa (loan)	9	(0)
2024	→ Portuguesa (loan)	0	(0)
- * Club domestic league appearances and goals as of 17:22, 6 August 2024 (UTC)

Eliel da Silva (born 16 November 2001), simply known as Eliel, is a Brazilian professional footballer who plays as a left-back for Guarani.

== Career ==
Born in Mogi Guaçu, São Paulo, Eliel joined Guarani's youth setup in 2019, after representing Mogi Mirim and hometown side Guaçuano. He made his first team debut with Bugre on 22 October 2020, coming on as a second-half substitute for Giovanny in a 1–1 Série B away draw against Vitória.

Despite featuring in 17 matches in his first season, Eliel subsequently became a backup option and featured sparingly. On 15 June 2023, he was loaned to União São João, but the move fell through four days later, after Diego Porfírio was separated from the squad.

On 12 January 2024, Eliel was announced on loan at Hercílio Luz. In the remainder of the season, he also served loan deals at Água Santa and Portuguesa.

== Career statistics ==
As of 15 November 2024

Club	Season	League			State League		Cup		Continental		Other		Total	
Club	Season	Division	Apps	Goals	Apps	Goals	Apps	Goals	Apps	Goals	Apps	Goals	Apps	Goals
Guarani	2020	Série B	17	0	0	0	—		—		—		17	0
Guarani	2021	Série B	7	0	7	0	—		—		—		14	0
Guarani	2022	Série B	4	0	5	0	0	0	—		—		9	0
Guarani	2023	Série B	1	0	—		—		—		—		1	0
Guarani	Total		29	0	12	0	0	0	—		—		41	0
Hercílio Luz (loan)	2024	Série D	—		7	0	—		—		—		7	0
Água Santa (loan)	2024	Série D	9	0	—		—		—		—		9	0
Portuguesa (loan)	2024	Paulista	—		—		—		—		3 (Note: Appearance(s) in Copa Paulista)	0	3	0
Career total			38	0	19	0	0	0	0	0	3	0	60	0
