= Dionathã =

Brazilian footballer (born 1998)

Personal information
- Full name: Dionathã da Silva
- Date of birth: 24 January 1998 (age 28)
- Place of birth: Rebouças, Brazil
- Height: 1.74 m (5 ft 8 1/2 in)
- Positions: Winger; forward

Team information
- Current team: Boa Esporte

Youth career
- –2012: Avaí
- 2013–2017: Grêmio

Senior career*
Years	Team	Apps	(Gls)
2017–2020	Grêmio	10	(1)
2018	→ Paysandu (loan)	8	(1)
2020–2021	UD Oliveirense	24	(1)
2022-	Boa Esporte	0	(0)
- * Club domestic league appearances and goals as of 18:05, 25 April 2022 (UTC)

Dionathã da Silva (born 24 January 1998), commonly known as Dionathã, is a Brazilian footballer who plays as a winger or striker for Boa Esporte.

== Club career ==
Dionathã is a youth exponent from Grêmio. He made his league debut on 13 August 2017 against Botafogo in a 1–0 away loss. He replaced Batista after 66 minutes. At 2 September 2017, Dionathã scored his first league goal, the latter in a 5–0 home win against Sport Recife.
