= Elvis (footballer, born 1996) =

Brazilian footballer (born 1996)

Personal information
- Full name: Elvis Garcia Carvalho
- Date of birth: 15 February 1996 (age 30)
- Place of birth: Campo Grande, Brazil
- Height: 1.73 m (5 ft 8 in)
- Position: Midfielder

Team information
- Current team: Rio Branco-PR

Youth career
- 2011–2015: Desportivo Brasil
- 2014–2015: → Porto (loan)
- 2015–2016: Atlético Paranaense

Senior career*
Years	Team	Apps	(Gls)
2017	Boa Esporte	5	(0)
2017–2019	Ferroviária	10	(0)
2019	→ Inter de Limeira (loan)	18	(2)
2020	Iporá	10	(0)
2020–2021	Pouso Alegre	4	(0)
2021	→ Monte Azul (loan)	15	(1)
2021	Inter de Limeira	0	(0)
2022	Nacional-SP	9	(0)
2024	Aquidauanense	10	(1)
2024–	Rio Branco-PR	9	(0)
2024	→ Portuguesa (loan)	0	(0)
- * Club domestic league appearances and goals as of 19:28, 15 August 2024 (UTC)

Elvis Garcia Carvalho (born 15 February 1996), simply known as Elvis, is a Brazilian footballer who plays as a midfielder for Rio Branco-PR.

== Career ==
Born in Campo Grande, Mato Grosso do Sul, Elvis played for Desportivo Brasil as a youth, and spent a trial period at Manchester City before signing for FC Porto in 2014. After playing for their under-19 side, he returned to his home country, playing for Atlético Paranaense before making his senior debut with Boa Esporte.

In June 2017, Elvis signed for Ferroviária. He was loaned to Inter de Limeira ahead of the 2019 season, and subsequently played for Iporá and Pouso Alegre during the 2020 campaign.

After a loan spell at Monte Azul, Elvis returned to Inter on 1 September 2021, but failed to feature for the club as they were knocked out from the 2021 Série D. He featured for Nacional-SP in the 2022 Campeonato Paulista Série A3, before spending the entire 2023 season without a club.

In December 2023, Elvis was included in Aquidauanense's squad for the ensuing Campeonato Sul-Mato-Grossense. He was announced at Rio Branco-PR on 26 April 2024, and helped the side in their promotion from the Campeonato Paranaense Série Prata before being loaned to Portuguesa on 5 August.

== Career statistics ==
As of 15 November 2024

Club	Season	League			State League		Cup		Continental		Other		Total	
Club	Season	Division	Apps	Goals	Apps	Goals	Apps	Goals	Apps	Goals	Apps	Goals	Apps	Goals
Boa Esporte	2017	Série B	0	0	5	0	—		—		—		5	0
Ferroviária	2017	Paulista	—		—		—		—		22 (Note: Appearance(s) in Copa Paulista)	1	22	1
Ferroviária	2018	Série D	2	0	8	0	—		—		9	0	19	0
Ferroviária	Total		2	0	8	0	—		—		31	1	41	1
Inter de Limeira	2019	Paulista A2	—		18	2	—		—		—		18	2
Iporá	2020	Goiano	—		10	0	—		—		—		10	0
Pouso Alegre	2020	Mineiro Módulo II	—		4	0	—		—		—		4	0
Monte Azul	2021	Paulista A2	—		15	1	—		—		—		15	1
Inter de Limeira	2021	Série D	0	0	—		—		—		—		0	0
Nacional-SP	2022	Paulista A3	—		9	0	—		—		—		9	0
Aquidauanense	2024	Sul-Mato-Grossense	—		10	1	—		—		—		10	1
Rio Branco-PR	2024	Paranaense Série Prata	—		9	0	—		—		—		9	0
Portuguesa (loan)	2024	Paulista	—		—		—		—		8	0	8	0
Career total			2	0	88	4	0	0	0	0	39	1	129	5
