= Pedro Balotelli =

Brazilian footballer

Personal information
- Full name: Pedro Henrique da Silva Barbosa
- Date of birth: 15 January 2005 (age 21)
- Place of birth: Franca, Brazil
- Position: Forward

Team information
- Current team: Novorizontino
- Number: 18

Youth career
- 2019: Cruzeiro
- 2020: Atlético Goianiense
- 2021–2022: Atlético Mineiro
- 2023–2025: Novorizontino

Senior career*
Years	Team	Apps	(Gls)
2025–	Novorizontino	5	(1)
- * Club domestic league appearances and goals as of 00:44, 28 July 2025 (UTC)

Pedro Henrique da Silva Barbosa (born 15 January 2005), known as Pedro Balotelli, is a Brazilian footballer who plays as a forward for Novorizontino.

== Career ==
Born in Franca, São Paulo, Pedro Balotelli represented the youth sides of Cruzeiro, Atlético Goianiense and Atlético Mineiro before joining Novorizontino in 2023. With the latter club, he won the 2024 Campeonato Paulista Sub-20, scoring 19 goals in the competition.

Pedro Balotelli made his first team debut on 18 January 2025; after coming on as a half-time substitute for Patrick Brey, he scored his team's first in a 2–2 Campeonato Paulista away draw against Portuguesa. He subsequently became a regular option in the first team, and renewed his contract until 2027 late in that month.

== Career statistics ==
As of 27 July 2025

Club	Season	League			State League		Cup		Continental		Other		Total	
Club	Season	Division	Apps	Goals	Apps	Goals	Apps	Goals	Apps	Goals	Apps	Goals	Apps	Goals
Novorizontino	2025	Série B	1	0	4	1	0	0	—		—		5	1
Career total			1	0	4	1	0	0	0	0	0	0	5	1

== Honours ==
Novorizontino

- Campeonato Paulista Sub-20: 2024
