= Leonardo Leocovick =

Brazilian footballer

Leocovick
Personal information
- Full name: Leonardo Leocovick
- Date of birth: 15 June 1999 (age 27)
- Place of birth: Santa Rosa, Brazil
- Height: 1.80 m (5 ft 11 in)
- Position: Left-back

Team information
- Current team: Inter de Limeira
- Number: 6

Youth career
- 2011–2015: Grêmio
- 2016–2019: Internacional

Senior career*
Years	Team	Apps	(Gls)
2020–2021	Vitória	18	(0)
2021–2022	Avaí	1	(0)
2022–2024	Grêmio Prudente	40	(1)
2023	→ Botafogo-PB (loan)	7	(1)
2024	→ Inter de Limeira (loan)	15	(0)
2025–	Inter de Limeira	14	(0)
- * Club domestic league appearances and goals as of 16:01, 4 June 2025 (UTC)

Leonardo Leocovick (born 15 June 1999), commonly known as Leocovick, is a Brazilian footballer who plays as a left-back for Inter de Limeira.

== Career ==
Born in Santa Rosa, Rio Grande do Sul, Leocovick played for the youth sides of Grêmio and Internacional before joining Vitória on 2 January 2020, being initially assigned to the under-23 team.

Leocovick played with the under-23s in the 2020 Campeonato Baiano, and subsequently featured sparingly with the main squad before rescinding his contract on 25 March 2021, to move to Avaí. He featured mainly with the under-23 squad, and signed for Grêmio Prudente on 19 April 2022.

On 24 October 2022, Leocovick was announced on loan at Botafogo-PB for the upcoming season, but was released from the club the following 11 April, and subsequently returned to Grêmio Prudente.

On 7 May 2024, Leocovick joined Inter de Limeira on loan. On 1 October, he signed a permanent deal with the club.

== Career statistics ==
As of 4 June 2025

Club	Season	League			State League		Cup		Continental		Other		Total	
Club	Season	Division	Apps	Goals	Apps	Goals	Apps	Goals	Apps	Goals	Apps	Goals	Apps	Goals
Vitória	2020	Série B	10	0	6	0	0	0	—		0	0	16	0
Vitória	2021	Série B	0	0	2	0	0	0	—		1 (Note: Appearance(s) in Copa do Nordeste)	0	3	0
Vitória	Subtotal		10	0	8	0	0	0	—		1	0	19	0
Avaí	2021	Série B	0	0	—		—		—		4 (Note: Appearance(s) in Copa Santa Catarina)	0	4	0
Avaí	2022	Série A	0	0	1	0	0	0	—		—		1	0
Avaí	Subtotal		0	0	1	0	0	0	—		4	0	5	0
Grêmio Prudente	2022	Paulista 2ª Divisão	—		20	0	—		—		—		20	0
Grêmio Prudente	2023	Paulista A3	—		—		—		—		14 (Note: Appearance(s) in Copa Paulista)	4	14	4
Grêmio Prudente	2024	Paulista A3	—		20	1	—		—		—		20	1
Grêmio Prudente	Subtotal		—		40	1	—		—		14	4	54	5
Botafogo-PB (loan)	2023	Série C	0	0	7	1	1	0	—		1	0	9	1
Inter de Limeira	2024	Série D	15	0	—		—		—		—		15	0
Inter de Limeira	2025	Série D	6	0	8	0	—		—		—		14	0
Inter de Limeira	Subtotal		21	0	8	0	—		—		—		29	0
Career total			31	0	64	2	1	0	0	0	20	4	116	5

== Honours ==
Grêmio Prudente

- Campeonato Paulista Segunda Divisão: 2022
