= Antônio Falcão =

Brazilian footballer

Personal information
- Full name: Antônio Roberto de Souza Junior
- Date of birth: 16 July 2001 (age 25)
- Place of birth: Panorama, Brazil
- Height: 1.74 m (5 ft 9 in)
- Position: Midfielder

Team information
- Current team: Capital-DF (on loan from Amazonas)

Youth career
- 2015–2021: São Paulo

Senior career*
Years	Team	Apps	(Gls)
2022	Athletic-MG	12	(1)
2022	Itabirito	11	(5)
2023	Athletic-MG	28	(3)
2023–2024	Al Dhafra		
2024–	Amazonas	0	(0)
2024	→ Aparecidense (loan)	5	(0)
2025	→ Botafogo-PB (loan)	12	(3)
2025–	→ Capital-DF (loan)	6	(0)
- * Club domestic league appearances and goals as of 29 May 2025

Antônio Roberto de Souza Junior (born 16 July 2001), better known as Antônio Falcão, is a Brazilian professional footballer who plays as a midfielder for Capital-DF on loan from Amazonas.

== Career ==
Antônio Falcão was trained in the youth categories of São Paulo FC, however he became a professional at Athletic Club de São João Del-Rei, where he competed in the 2022 and 2023 editions of the Campeonato Mineiro. He was champion of the Recopa Mineira and participated in the club's promotion campaign in 2023 Série D. After the end of the competition, he joined at Al Dhafra FC.

Falcão returned to Brazil in 2024, at Amazonas FC, but without finding space at the club he was loaned to Aparecidense in the final stretch of the 2024 Campeonato Brasileiro Série C. In 2025 he was again loaned to Botafogo-PB, where he was state runner-up, and to Capital CF for the 2025 Campeonato Brasileiro Série D.

== Honours ==
Athletic Club

- Recopa Mineira: 2023
