= Yavir Kadir =

Panamanian footballer

Personal information
- Full name: Yavir Kadir White Quintero
- Date of birth: 10 February 2003 (age 23)
- Place of birth: Colón, Panama
- Height: 1.82 m (6 ft 0 in)
- Position: Forward

Youth career
- 2018–2020: Tauro
- 2021: Grêmio
- 2021: Rondonópolis
- 2022–2024: Portuguesa

Senior career*
Years	Team	Apps	(Gls)
2022	Academia	2	(0)
2024	Portuguesa	0	(0)
2024	→ São Caetano (loan)	12	(2)
2025	Paulista	9	(0)
- * Club domestic league appearances and goals as of 14:41, 19 November 2025 (UTC)

Yavir Kadir White Quintero (born 10 February 2003) is a Brazilian footballer who plays as a forward.

== Early life ==
Born and raised in a favela in Colón, Kadir was raised by his mother (deceased in 2021) after his father left both in his childhood. He quit school at the age of 14 to pursue his footballing dream.

== Career ==
After playing in social projects in his hometown, Kadir was a part of Tauro's youth setup, where he managed to train with the first team squad. He moved to Brazil in 2021, after having a trial period with Grêmio, but registration issues prevented him from signing a contract, and he left after seven months.

Kadir then spent three months at Rondonópolis, before being a part of Academia's squad for the 2022 Campeonato Mato-Grossense. After two first team appearances, he joined Portuguesa and was assigned to the under-20 team.

On 12 May 2023, Kadir renewed his contract with Lusa for a further year. On 31 January 2024, he was loaned to São Caetano for the Campeonato Paulista Série A3, scoring on his debut against Lemense the following day.

Kadir returned to Portuguesa in April 2024, and signed a new deal until December 2025. He featured rarely for the club in the year's Copa Paulista, and moved to Paulista in March 2025.

== Career statistics ==
As of 19 November 2025

Club	Season	League			State League		Cup		Continental		Other		Total	
Club	Season	Division	Apps	Goals	Apps	Goals	Apps	Goals	Apps	Goals	Apps	Goals	Apps	Goals
Academia	2022	Mato-Grossense	—		2	0	—		—		—		2	0
Portuguesa	2024	Paulista	—		—		—		—		7 (Note: Appearance(s) in Copa Paulista)	0	7	0
São Caetano (loan)	2024	Paulista A3	—		12	2	—		—		—		12	2
Paulista	2025	Paulista A4	—		9	0	—		—		—		9	0
Career total			0	0	23	2	0	0	0	0	7	0	30	2
