= Iruan =

Brazilian footballer

Personal information
- Full name: Iruan Lima Soares
- Date of birth: 23 December 2003 (age 22)
- Place of birth: Coaraci, Brazil
- Height: 1.80 m (5 ft 11 in)
- Position: Forward

Team information
- Current team: Coritiba

Youth career
- 2019–2023: Coritiba

Senior career*
Years	Team	Apps	(Gls)
2024–	Coritiba	0	(0)
2024	→ CRAC (loan)	3	(0)
2024	→ Portuguesa (loan)	0	(0)
- * Club domestic league appearances and goals as of 20:58, 12 July 2024 (UTC)

Iruan Lima Soares (born 23 December 2003), simply known as Iruan, is a Brazilian footballer who plays as a forward for Coritiba.

== Career ==
Iruan was born in Coaraci, Bahia, and joined Coritiba's youth sides in 2019. In July 2021, he signed his first professional contract with the club.

In February 2024, Iruan was loaned to Série D side CRAC. He made his senior debut on 15 February, coming on as a late substitute in a 0–0 Campeonato Goiano home draw against Goiânia.

On 26 June 2024, Iruan was loaned to Portuguesa for the Copa Paulista.

== Career statistics ==
As of 26 August 2024

Club	Season	League			State League		Cup		Continental		Other		Total	
Club	Season	Division	Apps	Goals	Apps	Goals	Apps	Goals	Apps	Goals	Apps	Goals	Apps	Goals
CRAC	2024	Série D	0	0	3	0	—		—		—		3	0
Portuguesa	2024	Paulista	—		—		—		—		4 (Note: Appearance(s) in Copa Paulista)	0	4	0
Career total			0	0	3	0	0	0	0	0	4	0	7	0
