= Theo Lanza =

Brazilian footballer

Personal information
- Full name: Theo Henrique Lanza Francisco
- Date of birth: 31 July 2003 (age 23)
- Place of birth: Americana, Brazil
- Height: 1.71 m (5 ft 7 in)
- Position: Forward

Team information
- Current team: Guarani

Youth career
- 2013–2015: Rio Branco-SP
- 2016–2024: Guarani

Senior career*
Years	Team	Apps	(Gls)
2024–	Guarani	0	(0)
2024	→ Ipatinga (loan)	9	(0)
2024	→ Portuguesa (loan)	0	(0)
- * Club domestic league appearances and goals as of 21:46, 16 August 2024 (UTC)

Theo Henrique Lanza Francisco (born 31 July 2003), known as Theo Lanza or just Theo, is a Brazilian footballer who plays as a forward for Guarani.

== Career ==
Born in Americana, São Paulo, Theo joined Guarani's youth setup in 2016, from hometown side Rio Branco-SP. In December 2022, he signed his first professional contract with the club.

In April 2024, Theo was loaned to Série D side Ipatinga. He made his senior debut on 27 April, starting in a 0–0 away draw against Portuguesa-RJ.

On 10 August 2024, Theo was loaned to Portuguesa for the Copa Paulista.

== Career statistics ==
As of 16 August 2024

Club	Season	League			State League		Cup		Continental		Other		Total	
Club	Season	Division	Apps	Goals	Apps	Goals	Apps	Goals	Apps	Goals	Apps	Goals	Apps	Goals
Ipatinga	2024	Série D	9	0	—		—		—		—		9	0
Portuguesa	2024	Paulista	—		—		—		—		0	0	0	0
Career total			9	0	0	0	0	0	0	0	0	0	9	0
