= Leonardo Muchacho =

Brazilian footballer

Leo Muchacho
Personal information
- Full name: Leonardo Ferreira Gonçalves
- Date of birth: 11 October 2000 (age 26)
- Place of birth: Guanhães, Brazil
- Height: 1.82 m (6 ft 0 in)
- Position: Forward

Team information
- Current team: Nova Iguaçu

Senior career*
Years	Team	Apps	(Gls)
2019–2022	Desportivo Brasil	4	(0)
2020	→ Internacional (loan)	1	(0)
2021	→ Cianorte (loan)	6	(1)
2022	Itabirito	11	(4)
2023	Sertãozinho	14	(5)
2023–2024	Boa Esporte	12	(7)
2025–2025	Capivariano	15	(0)
2025–2025	Pouso Alegre (loan)	13	(4)
2026–2026	Portuguesa (RJ)	10	(0)
2026–	Nova Iguaçu	9	(1)
- * Club domestic league appearances and goals as of 8 July 2026

Leonardo Ferreira Gonçalves (born 11 October 2000), better known as Leo Muchacho, is a Brazilian professional footballer who plays as a forward for Nova Iguaçu.

== Professional career ==
A youth product of Desportivo Brasil, Muchacho joined Internacional on loan in 2019. Muchacho made his professional debut with Internacional in a 1-0 Campeonato Brasileiro Série A loss to Fortaleza on 20 September 2020. He returned to Desportivo Brasil in January 2021 after his loan ended.
