= 2026 SE Palmeiras season =

Palmeiras
2026 season
- President: Leila Pereira
- Coach: Abel Ferreira
- Stadium: Nubank Parque
- Série A: Runners-up
- Campeonato Paulista: Winners
- Copa do Brasil: Final
- Copa Libertadores: Final
- Top goalscorer: League: José Manuel López; Maurício (10 goals each); All: José Manuel López (24 goals)
- Highest home attendance: 41,282 vs. Santos (2 May 2026)
- Lowest home attendance: 8,953 vs. Vitória (4 February 2026)
- Average home league attendance: 29,645
| Home colors | Away colors | Third colors |
- All statistics correct as of 21 November 2026.

The 2026 season is the 112th in Sociedade Esportiva Palmeiras' existence. This season Palmeiras is participating in the Campeonato Paulista, Copa Libertadores, Copa do Brasil and Série A.

In the league, the club became the first to finish as runners-up for the third consecutive time.

== Kits ==
Supplier: Puma
Sponsors: Sportingbet (Main sponsor) / Leapmotor (Back of the shirt) / Grupo Cimed (Shoulder) / Sil Cabos (Sleeves) / Uniasselvi (Shorts) / D'Italia Panelas (Shorts)

Kits from the 2026 season
| Home | Home alt.^{1} | Away | Away alt.^{1} | Away alt.^{2} | Goalkeeper^{1} | Goalkeeper^{2} | Goalkeeper^{3} | Third |

Kits from the 2025 season
Third

=== Kit information ===
This is Puma's 7th year supplying Palmeiras kit, having taken over from Adidas at the beginning of the 2019 season. (Note: The deal was signed in 23 March 2018.)

- Home: TBD
- Away: TBD
- GK: The new goalkeeper kits are based on Puma's goalkeeper template for the 2025–26 season. The second kit, predominantly off-white, is exclusive to Palmeiras.

=== Kit usage ===
As of 18 March 2026

| Kit | Combination | Usage |
Kits from the 2026 season
| Home | Green shirt, white shorts and green socks. | Campeonato Brasileiro: used at home against Vitória, Fluminense, Mirassol and Botafogo.; Campeonato Paulista: used at home against Santos, Mirassol, São Paulo, Capivariano and Novorizontino; used away against Corinthians and Novorizontino. |
| Home alt.^{1} | Green shirt, green shorts and green socks. | Campeonato Paulista: used at home against Guarani; used away against Botafogo. |
| Away | White shirt, green shorts and white socks. | |
| Away alt.^{1} | White shirt, white shorts and white socks. | Campeonato Brasileiro: used away against Atlético Mineiro.; Campeonato Paulista: used away against Portuguesa and Novorizontino. |
| Away alt.^{2} | White shirt, green shorts and green socks. | Campeonato Brasileiro: used away against Internacional. |
| Goalkeeper^{1} | Lime shirt, lime shorts and lime socks. | Campeonato Brasileiro: used at home against Fluminense. used away against Internacional.; Campeonato Paulista: used at home against Santos, São Paulo, Capivariano and Novorizontino; used away against Portuguesa. |
| Goalkeeper^{2} | Off-white shirt, off-white shorts and off-white socks. | Campeonato Paulista: used away against Novorizontino. |
| Goalkeeper^{3} | Red shirt, red shorts and red socks. | Campeonato Brasileiro: used at home against Vitória, Mirassol and Botafogo; used away against Atlético Mineiro and Vasco da Gama.; Campeonato Paulista: used at home against Mirassol and Guarani; used away against Botafogo, Corinthians and Novorizontino. |
Kits from the 2025 season
| Third | Yellow shirt, blue shorts and white socks. | Campeonato Brasileiro: used away against Vasco da Gama. |

== Squad information ==
As of 31 August 2026.

Note: Flags indicate national team as defined under FIFA eligibility rules; some limited exceptions apply. Players may hold more than one non-FIFA nationality.

| No. | Pos. | Nation | Player |
|---|---|---|---|
| 1 | GK | BRA | Carlos Miguel |
| 2 | DF | ARG | Alexander Barboza |
| 3 | DF | BRA | Bruno Fuchs |
| 4 | DF | ARG | Agustín Giay |
| 6 | DF | BRA | Jefté |
| 7 | MF | BRA | Felipe Anderson |
| 8 | MF | BRA | Andreas Pereira |
| 9 | FW | BRA | Vitor Roque |
| 10 | FW | BRA | Paulinho |
| 11 | MF | COL | Jhon Arias |
| 12 | DF | BRA | Khellven |
| 14 | GK | BRA | Marcelo Lomba |
| 15 | DF | PAR | Gustavo Gómez (captain) |

| No. | Pos. | Nation | Player |
|---|---|---|---|
| 17 | MF | BRA | Marlon Freitas |
| 18 | MF | PAR | Maurício |
| 19 | FW | PAR | Ramón Sosa |
| 21 | GK | BRA | Bruno Bertinato |
| 22 | DF | URU | Joaquín Piquerez |
| 26 | DF | BRA | Murilo |
| 30 | MF | BRA | Lucas Evangelista |
| 32 | MF | URU | Emiliano Martínez |
| 42 | FW | ARG | José Manuel López |
| 43 | DF | BRA | Benedetti |
| 48 | MF | BRA | Larson |
| 56 | DF | BRA | Arthur |

== Transfers ==
=== Transfers in ===
| Pos. | Player | Transferred from | Fee/notes | Date | Source |
|---|---|---|---|---|---|
| DF | (Brazil) Bruno Fuchs | (Brazil) Atlético Mineiro | $4,000,000 | 18 December 2025 | |
| MF | (Brazil) Marlon Freitas | (Brazil) Botafogo | €5,500,000 | 4 January 2026 | |
| MF | (Colombia) Jhon Arias | (England) Wolverhampton | €25,000,000 | 7 February 2026 | |
| DF | (Argentina) Alexander Barboza | (Brazil) Botafogo | $4,000,000 | 22 May 2026 | |
| GK | (Brazil) Bruno Bertinato | (Brazil) Portuguesa | Sign. | 25 August 2026 | |

=== Transfers out ===
| Pos. | Player | Transferred to | Fee/notes | Date | Source |
|---|---|---|---|---|---|
| MF | (Argentina) Aníbal Moreno | (Argentina) River Plate | $7,000,000 | 21 December 2025 | |
| DF | (Brazil) Micael | (United States) Inter Miami CF | Loan. | 7 January 2026 | |
| GK | (Brazil) Weverton | (Brazil) Grêmio | Sign. | 15 January 2026 | |
| FW | (Uruguay) Facundo Torres | (United States) Austin FC | $9,500,000 | 23 January 2026 | |
| MF | (Brazil) Raphael Veiga | (Mexico) Club América | Loan. | 3 February 2026 | |
| FW | (Brazil) Bruno Rodrigues | (Brazil) Cruzeiro | Loan. | 18 February 2026 | |
| MF | (Brazil) Figueiredo | | Released. | 12 June 2026 | |
| GK | (Brazil) Aranha | (Portugal) Moreirense | Loan. | 26 June 2026 | |
| DF | (Brazil) Naves | (Mexico) Necaxa | $3,000,000 | 21 July 2026 | |
| FW | (Brazil) Luighi | (United States) New York City FC | Loan. | 28 July 2026 | |
| GK | (Brazil) Kaique | (Portugal) Sporting | €4,000,000 | 29 August 2026 | |
| FW | (Brazil) Allan | (England) Manchester City | €40,000,000 | 31 August 2026 | |

== Competitions ==
=== Overview ===
| Competition | First match | Last match | Starting round | Final position | Record | | | | | | | |
| Competition | First match | Last match | Starting round | Final position | Pld | W | D | L | GF | GA | GD | Win % |
|---|---|---|---|---|---|---|---|---|---|---|---|---|
| Campeonato Paulista | 10 January 2026 | 8 March 2026 | League phase | Winners | 12 | 9 | 1 | 2 | 17 | 9 | +8 | 75.00 |
| Série A | 28 January 2026 | 2 December 2026 | Matchday 1 | Runners-up | 36 | 21 | 11 | 4 | 64 | 26 | +38 | 58.33 |
| Copa Libertadores | 8 April 2026 | 28 November 2026 | Group stage | TBD | 12 | 6 | 3 | 3 | 17 | 11 | +6 | 50.00 |
| Copa do Brasil | 23 April 2026 | 6 December 2026 | Fifth round | TBD | 8 | 5 | 1 | 2 | 17 | 6 | +11 | 62.50 |
| Total | | | | | 68 | 41 | 16 | 11 | 115 | 52 | +63 | 60.29 |

Last updated: 21 November 2026
Source: Competitions

=== Campeonato Paulista ===
==== League phase ====
| Pos | Team | Pld | W | D | L | GF | GA | GD | Pts | Qualification |
|---|---|---|---|---|---|---|---|---|---|---|
| 1 | Novorizontino | 8 | 5 | 1 | 2 | 16 | 10 | +6 | 16 | Qualification for the Quarter-finals |
| 2 | Palmeiras | 8 | 5 | 1 | 2 | 8 | 7 | +1 | 16 | Qualification for the Quarter-finals |
| 3 | Red Bull Bragantino | 8 | 4 | 4 | 0 | 14 | 2 | +12 | 16 | Qualification for the Quarter-finals |
| 4 | Portuguesa | 8 | 5 | 0 | 3 | 11 | 7 | +4 | 15 | Qualification for the Quarter-finals |
| 5 | Corinthians | 8 | 4 | 2 | 2 | 10 | 6 | +4 | 14 | Qualification for the Quarter-finals |

Source: FPF
Rules for classification: 1) points; 2) wins; 3) goal difference; 4) goals scored; 5) head-to-head results (only between 2 teams); 6) fewest red cards; 7) fewest yellow cards; 8) draw.

===== Results by round =====
| Round | 1 | 2 | 3 | 4 | 5 | 6 | 7 | 8 |
|---|---|---|---|---|---|---|---|---|
| Ground | A | H | H | A | H | A | A | H |
| Result | W | W | W | L | W | L | W | D |
| Position | 6 | 2 | 2 | 3 | 2 | 2 | 2 | 2 |
| Points | 3 | 6 | 9 | 9 | 12 | 12 | 15 | 16 |

Source: Soccerway
A = Away; H = Home; W = Win; D = Draw; L = Loss; P = Postponed

===== Matches =====
The basic schedule was announced on 27 November 2025. And the full schedule was announced on 20 December 2025.

| 10 January 2026 1 | Portuguesa | 0–1 | Palmeiras | São Paulo |
| 20:30 UTC−3 | Gustavo Salomão (yellow card) 5'; Igor Torres (red card) 51'; Eduardo Biazus (yellow card) 73'; Hudson (yellow card) 76'; Guilherme Portuga (yellow card) 90+4' | Report | Murilo (yellow card) 39'; Luighi 53'; Benedetti (yellow card) 90+2' | Stadium: Canindé; Attendance: 9,624; Referee: Lucas Canetto Bellote |

| 14 January 2026 2 | Palmeiras | 1–0 | Santos | Barueri |
| 19:30 UTC−3 | Allan 41'; López (yellow card) 79'; Luighi (yellow card) 87' | Report | Igor Vinícius (yellow card) 13'; Frías (yellow card) 37' | Stadium: Arena Barueri; Attendance: 21,342; Referee: João Vitor Gobi |

| 17 January 2026 3 | Palmeiras | 1–0 | Mirassol | Barueri |
| 20:30 UTC−3 | Sosa (yellow card) 66'; López 72'; Carlos Miguel (yellow card) 78' | Report | Shaylon (yellow card) 7'; João Victor (yellow card) 62'; Renato Marques (yellow card) 83'; Reinaldo (yellow card) 90+4' | Stadium: Arena Barueri; Attendance: 12,654; Referee: Lucas Canetto Bellote |

| 20 January 2026 4 | Novorizontino | 4–0 | Palmeiras | Novo Horizonte |
| 20:00 UTC−3 | Robson 20', 42', 62', (yellow card) 66'; Hélio Borges 72'; Patrick (yellow card) 87'; Alvariño (yellow card) 88' | Report | Khellven (yellow card) 70' | Stadium: Estádio Doutor Jorge Ismael de Biasi; Attendance: 7,396; Referee: Fabiano Monteiro dos Santos |

| 24 January 2026 5 | Palmeiras | 3–1 | São Paulo | Barueri |
| 18:30 UTC−3 | Maurício 8'; Khellven (yellow card) 22', (goal) 51'; López 31'; Bruno Fuchs (yellow card) 57' | Report | Bobadilla 13'; Calleri (yellow card) 88' | Stadium: Arena Barueri; Attendance: 23,842; Referee: Matheus Delgado Candançan |

| 1 February 2026 6 | Botafogo | 1–0 | Palmeiras | Ribeirão Preto |
| 20:30 UTC−3 | Matheus Sales (yellow card) 32'; Hygor (yellow card) 33'; Leandro Maciel (yellow card) 45', (goal) 50'; Gabriel Inocêncio (yellow card) 45+4'; Vilar (yellow card) 54' (yellow-red card) 64'; Victor Souza (yellow card) 90+3'; Márcio Maranhão (yellow card) 90+4' | Report | Larson (yellow card) 45+3'; Sosa (yellow card) 82' | Stadium: Santa Cruz; Attendance: 9,337; Referee: Marianna Nanni Batalha |

| 8 February 2026 7 | Corinthians | 0–1 | Palmeiras | São Paulo |
| 20:30 UTC−3 | Matheus Pereira (yellow card) 19'; Breno Bidon (yellow card) 41' | Report | Andreas Pereira (yellow card) 56'; Maurício (yellow card) 58'; López 84' | Stadium: Neo Química Arena; Attendance: 45,660; Referee: Raphael Claus |

| 15 February 2026 8 | Palmeiras | 1–1 | Guarani | Barueri |
| 20:30 UTC−3 | Jefté (yellow card) 41'; López 77'; Bruno Fuchs (yellow card) 90+5' | Report | Lucca 8', (yellow card) 78'; Willian Farias (yellow card) 29'; Ralf (yellow card) 48'; Caíque França (yellow card) 65' | Stadium: Arena Barueri; Attendance: 11,019; Referee: João Vitor Gobi |

==== Quarter-final ====
| 21 February 2026 | Palmeiras | 4–0 | Capivariano | Barueri |
| 20:30 UTC−3 | Vitor Roque 6', 36'; Marlon Freitas (yellow card) 52'; Andreas Pereira 90+2' (pen.); Sosa 90+4' | Report | Carlos Eduardo (yellow card) 17'; Diogo Mateus (yellow card) 28' | Stadium: Arena Barueri; Attendance: 21,531; Referee: Edina Alves Batista |

==== Semi-final ====
| 1 March 2026 | Palmeiras | 2–1 | São Paulo | Barueri |
| 20:30 UTC−3 | Maurício 8'; Piquerez (yellow card) 51'; López 58'; Gómez (yellow card) 87' | Report | Sabino (yellow card) 56'; Calleri 69' (pen.); Cauly (yellow card) 82'; Marcos Antônio (yellow card) 90+3' | Stadium: Arena Barueri; Attendance: 29,717; Referee: Daiane Muniz |

==== Finals ====
| 4 March 2026 First leg | Palmeiras | 1–0 | Novorizontino | Barueri |
| 20:00 UTC−3 | López 35'; Maurício (yellow card) 65'; Arias (yellow card) 83' | Report | Alvariño (yellow card) 15'; Dantas (yellow card) 16'; Léo Naldi (yellow card) 29'; Jordi (yellow card) 83' | Stadium: Arena Barueri; Attendance: 26,802; Referee: Matheus Delgado Candançan |

| 8 March 2026 Second leg | Novorizontino | 1–2 (1–3 agg.) | Palmeiras | Novo Horizonte |
| 20:30 UTC−3 | Matheus Bianqui 26'; Rômulo (yellow card) 60'; Alvariño (yellow card) 67' | Report | Murilo 6'; López (yellow card) 14'; Gómez (yellow card) 28'; Vitor Roque 62' | Stadium: Estádio Doutor Jorge Ismael de Biasi; Attendance: 9,902; Referee: Flávio Rodrigues de Souza |

=== Série A ===
==== Standings ====
| Pos | Team | Pld | W | D | L | GF | GA | GD | Pts | Qualification or relegation |
|---|---|---|---|---|---|---|---|---|---|---|
| 1 | Flamengo (C, Q) | 36 | 24 | 8 | 4 | 74 | 31 | +43 | 80 | Qualification for Copa Libertadores group stage |
| 2 | Palmeiras (Q) | 36 | 21 | 11 | 4 | 64 | 26 | +38 | 74 | Qualification for Copa Libertadores group stage |
| 3 | Cruzeiro (Q) | 36 | 20 | 6 | 10 | 59 | 50 | +9 | 66 | Qualification for Copa Libertadores group stage |
| 4 | Fluminense (T) | 35 | 17 | 9 | 9 | 56 | 42 | +14 | 60 | Qualification for Copa Libertadores group stage |
| 5 | Athletico Paranaense (X) | 35 | 15 | 9 | 11 | 52 | 45 | +7 | 54 | Qualification for Copa Libertadores second stage (Note: Since Palmeiras, who qualified for the Copa Libertadores group stage on league performance, reached the 2026 Copa do Brasil final, the Copa Libertadores second stage berth allocated to the 2026 Copa do Brasil runners-up was passed to the Série A's highest-placed team not already qualified.) |

Updated to match(es) played on 21 November 2026. Source: CBF
Rules for classification: 1) points; 2) wins; 3) goal difference; 4) goals scored; 5) head-to-head results (only between two teams); 6) fewest red cards; 7) fewest yellow cards; 8) drawing of lots.
(C) Champions; (Q) Qualified for the phase indicated; (T) Qualified, but not yet for the particular phase indicated; (X) Assured of Copa Sudamericana, but may still qualify for Copa Libertadores

==== Results by round ====
| Round | 1 | 2 | 3 | 4 | 5 | 6 | 7 | 8 | 9 | 10 | 11 | 12 | 13 | 14 | 15 | 16 | 17 | 18 | 19 | 20 | 21 | 22 | 23 | 24 | 25 | 26 | 27 | 28 | 29 | 30 | 31 | 32 | 33 | 34 | 35 | 36 | 37 | 38 |
|---|---|---|---|---|---|---|---|---|---|---|---|---|---|---|---|---|---|---|---|---|---|---|---|---|---|---|---|---|---|---|---|---|---|---|---|---|---|---|
| Ground | A | H | A | H | A | H | H | A | H | A | A | H | A | H | A | H | A | H | A | H | A | H | A | H | A | A | H | A | H | H | A | H | A | H | A | H | A | H |
| Result | D | W | W | W | L | W | W | W | W | W | D | W | W | D | D | D | W | W | W | L | W | D | L | W | D | D | W | D | W | W | W | W | D | W | L | D | | |
| Position | 10 | 2 | 1 | 1 | 2 | 2 | 1 | 1 | 1 | 1 | 1 | 1 | 1 | 1 | 1 | 1 | 1 | 1 | 1 | 1 | 1 | 1 | 1 | 1 | 1 | 2 | 2 | 2 | 2 | 2 | 2 | 2 | 2 | 2 | 2 | 2 | 2 | 2 |
| Points | 1 | 4 | 7 | 10 | 10 | 13 | 16 | 19 | 22 | 25 | 26 | 29 | 32 | 33 | 34 | 35 | 38 | 41 | 44 | 44 | 47 | 48 | 48 | 51 | 52 | 53 | 56 | 57 | 60 | 63 | 66 | 69 | 70 | 73 | 73 | 74 | | |

Updated to match(es) played on 21 November 2026. Source: CBF
A = Away; H = Home; W = Win; D = Draw; L = Loss; P = Postponed

==== Matches ====
The basic schedule was announced on 15 December 2025.

| 28 January 2026 1 | Atlético Mineiro | 2–2 | Palmeiras | Belo Horizonte |
| 19:00 UTC−3 | Victor Hugo 44'; Alan Franco (yellow card) 47'; Khellven 74' (o.g.); Alexsander (yellow card) 88'; Renan Lodi (yellow card) 90+8' | Report | López 27'; Maurício (yellow card) 81'; Vitor Roque 84', (yellow card) 88' | Stadium: Arena MRV; Attendance: 25,770; Referee: Bruno Arleu de Araújo (Rio de Janeiro) |

| 4 February 2026 2 | Palmeiras | 5–1 | Vitória | Barueri |
| 21:30 UTC−3 | Murilo 24'; Gómez 28'; Allan (yellow card) 45+2', (goal) 63'; Maurício 45+5'; Sosa 80' | Report | Nathan Mendes (yellow card) 25'; Ramon (yellow card) 49'; Zé Marcos (yellow card) 52'; Dudu 56'; Lawan (yellow card) 90' | Stadium: Arena Barueri; Attendance: 8,953; Referee: Sávio Pereira Sampaio (Distrito Federal) |

| 12 February 2026 3 | Internacional | 1–3 | Palmeiras | Porto Alegre |
| 21:30 UTC−3 | Ronaldo 36'; Paulinho (yellow card) 55' | Report | Gómez 23'; Vitor Roque 52'; Andreas Pereira (yellow card) 58', (goal) 82' | Stadium: Beira-Rio; Attendance: 17,693; Referee: Davi de Oliveira Lacerda (Espírito Santo) |

| 25 February 2026 4 | Palmeiras | 2–1 | Fluminense | Barueri |
| 21:30 UTC−3 | Vitor Roque 9' (pen.); Allan 13'; Khellven (yellow card) 35'; Arias (yellow card) 62'; Marlon Freitas (yellow card) 88' | Report | Fábio (yellow card) 8'; Freytes (yellow card) 30'; Martinelli (yellow card) 34'; Acosta 40'; Ignácio (yellow card) 69' | Stadium: Arena Barueri; Attendance: 10,329; Referee: Felipe Fernandes de Lima (Minas Gerais) |

| 12 March 2026 5 | Vasco | 2–1 | Palmeiras | Rio de Janeiro |
| 19:30 UTC−3 | Tchê Tchê (yellow card) 52'; Thiago Mendes 63', (yellow card) 65'; Cuiabano 74' | Report | López 40'; Luighi (yellow card) 72'; Allan (yellow card) 90+3' | Stadium: São Januário; Attendance: 17,291; Referee: Sávio Pereira Sampaio (Distrito Federal) |

| 15 March 2026 6 | Palmeiras | 1–0 | Mirassol | São Paulo |
| 18:30 UTC−3 | López 26'; Carlos Miguel (yellow card) 67' | Report | Neto Moura (yellow card) 21'; Reinaldo (yellow card) 29'; Negueba (yellow card) 90+6' | Stadium: Allianz Parque; Attendance: 35,360; Referee: Rodrigo José Pereira de Lima (Pernambuco) |

| 18 March 2026 7 | Palmeiras | 2–1 | Botafogo | São Paulo |
| 19:00 UTC−3 | Allan 9'; Arias 53'; Sosa (yellow card) 88' | Report | Medina (red card) 45'; Danilo 59'; Correa (yellow card) 89'; Villalba (yellow card) 90+6' | Stadium: Allianz Parque; Attendance: 29,450; Referee: Rafael Rodrigo Klein (Rio Grande do Sul) |

| 21 March 2026 8 | São Paulo | 0–1 | Palmeiras | São Paulo |
| 21:00 UTC−3 | Díaz (yellow card) 23'; Wendell (yellow card) 84'; André Silva (yellow card) 90+6' | Report | Arias 6', (yellow card) 90+4'; Andreas Pereira (yellow card) 43'; Carlos Miguel (yellow card) 45+4'; Marlon Freitas (yellow card) 50'; Martínez (yellow card) 81' | Stadium: Morumbi; Attendance: 54,058; Referee: Anderson Daronco (Rio Grande do Sul) |

| 2 April 2026 9 | Palmeiras | 2–1 | Grêmio | Barueri |
| 21:30 UTC−3 | Marlon Freitas 44', 72' | Report | Pedro Gabriel (yellow card) 40'; Carlos Vinícius 54'; Gustavo Martins (yellow card) 74'; Dodi (yellow card) 86' | Stadium: Arena Barueri; Attendance: 13,572; Referee: Bruno Arleu de Araújo (Rio de Janeiro) |

| 5 April 2026 10 | Bahia | 1–2 | Palmeiras | Salvador |
| 19:30 UTC−3 | Luciano Juba (yellow card) 40'; David Duarte 58'; Gabriel Xavier (yellow card) 90+1' | Report | Arias 42', (yellow card) 50'; Giay (yellow card) 55'; Khellven (yellow card) 85'; Ramos Mingo 88' (o.g.); Luighi (yellow card) 90+2' | Stadium: Arena Fonte Nova; Attendance: 41,645; Referee: Lucas Casagrande (Paraná) |

| 12 April 2026 11 | Corinthians | 0–0 | Palmeiras | São Paulo |
| 18:30 UTC−3 | André (red card) 35'; Matheuzinho (yellow card) 44' (red card) 71'; Raniele (yellow card) 90+3' | Report | Marlon Freitas (yellow card) 76' | Stadium: Neo Química Arena; Attendance: 46,466; Referee: Flávio Rodrigues de Souza (São Paulo) |

| 19 April 2026 12 | Palmeiras | 1–0 | Athletico Paranaense | São Paulo |
| 18:30 UTC−3 | Gómez 15'; Murilo (yellow card) 30' (yellow-red card) 47'; Sosa (yellow card) 71' | Report | Portilla (yellow card) 23'; Jadson (yellow card) 42'; João Cruz (yellow card) 56'; Esquivel (yellow card) 63' | Stadium: Allianz Parque; Attendance: 39,714; Referee: Felipe Fernandes de Lima (Minas Gerais) |

| 26 April 2026 13 | Red Bull Bragantino | 0–1 | Palmeiras | Bragança Paulista |
| 18:30 UTC−3 | Juninho Capixaba (yellow card) 45+4' | Report | López 21'; Felipe Anderson (yellow card) 64'; Giay (yellow card) 78' | Stadium: Cícero de Souza Marques; Attendance: 6,284; Referee: João Vitor Gobi (São Paulo) |

| 2 May 2026 14 | Palmeiras | 1–1 | Santos | São Paulo |
| 18:30 UTC−3 | López 64'; Luis Pacheco (yellow card) 90+9' | Report | Rollheiser 26'; Gabriel Brazão (yellow card) 32' | Stadium: Allianz Parque; Attendance: 41,282; Referee: Raphael Claus (São Paulo) |

| 10 May 2026 15 | Remo | 1–1 | Palmeiras | Belém |
| 17:40 UTC−3 | Alef Manga 2'; Zé Ricardo (red card) 74'; Marcelo Rangel (yellow card) 90+4' | Report | Jefté (yellow card) 5'; Sosa 24'; Allan (yellow card) 32' | Stadium: Mangueirão; Attendance: 40,629; Referee: Rafael Rodrigo Klein (Rio Grande do Sul) |
Note: Match was originally scheduled to be played at 16:00 (UTC−3), but it was delayed due to the heavy rain in Belém.

| 16 May 2026 16 | Palmeiras | 1–1 | Cruzeiro | Barueri |
| 21:00 UTC−3 | Felipe Anderson 20'; López (yellow card) 72'; Murilo (yellow card) 88' | Report | Arroyo 11', (yellow card) 11'; Matheus Pereira (yellow card) 41'; Otávio (yellow card) 75'; Lucas Silva (yellow card) 90+2' | Stadium: Arena Barueri; Attendance: 27,657; Referee: Sávio Pereira Sampaio (Distrito Federal) |

| 23 May 2026 17 | Flamengo | 0–3 | Palmeiras | Rio de Janeiro |
| 21:00 UTC−3 | Carrascal (red card) 21'; Paquetá (yellow card) 29'; Bruno Henrique (yellow card) 65'; De la Cruz (yellow card) 90+2'; Wallace Yan (yellow card) 90+10'; Léo Pereira (yellow card) 90+10' | Report | Andreas Pereira (yellow card) 32'; López 38', (yellow card) 40'; Allan 57'; Arias (yellow card) 61'; Carlos Miguel (yellow card) 72'; Giay (yellow card) 87'; Paulinho 90+5', (yellow card) 90+8' | Stadium: Maracanã; Attendance: 71,205; Referee: Davi de Oliveira Lacerda (Espírito Santo) |

| 31 May 2026 18 | Palmeiras | 1–0 | Chapecoense | São Paulo |
| 16:00 UTC−3 | Luis Pacheco (yellow card) 23'; Allan (red card) 43'; Paulinho 65' | Report | Italo (yellow card) 77' | Stadium: Nubank Parque; Attendance: 36,543; Referee: Felipe Fernandes de Lima (Minas Gerais) |

| 22 July 2026 19 | Coritiba | 1–3 | Palmeiras | Curitiba |
| 19:30 UTC−3 | Thiago Santos (yellow card) 45'; Paulo Roberto 68' | Report | Maurício 9', 19'; Sosa (yellow card) 15', (goal) 67'; Barboza (yellow card) 38'; Khellven (yellow card) 79' | Stadium: Couto Pereira; Attendance: 27,273; Referee: Anderson Daronco (Rio Grande do Sul) |

| 26 July 2026 20 | Palmeiras | 1–2 | Atlético Mineiro | São Paulo |
| 19:30 UTC−3 | Felipe Anderson 75' | Report | Preciado (yellow card) 31'; Victor Hugo 54'; Ruan (yellow card) 76'; Igor Gomes 77'; Renan Lodi (yellow card) 90+3' | Stadium: Nubank Parque; Attendance: 30,304; Referee: Bruno Arleu de Araújo (Rio de Janeiro) |

| 29 July 2026 21 | Vitória | 0–4 | Palmeiras | Salvador |
| 21:30 UTC−3 | Martínez (yellow card) 32'; Cacá (red card) 37'; Luan Cândido (red card) 40'; Fabiano (yellow card) 56'; Brítez (yellow card) 66' | Report | Marlon Freitas (yellow card) 14'; Maurício (yellow card) 27', (goal) 45+1'; Fabiano 45+6' (o.g.); Arias 70'; Sosa 84' | Stadium: Barradão; Attendance: 14,660; Referee: Alex Gomes Stefano (Rio de Janeiro) |

| 9 August 2026 22 | Palmeiras | 0–0 | Internacional | São Paulo |
| 16:00 UTC−3 | Murilo (yellow card) 39' | Report | Paulinho (yellow card) 52'; Aguirre (yellow card) 70'; Matheus Cunha (yellow card) 72' | Stadium: Nubank Parque; Attendance: 38,778; Referee: Davi de Oliveira Lacerda (Espírito Santo) |

| 15 August 2026 23 | Fluminense | 3–2 | Palmeiras | Rio de Janeiro |
| 16:30 UTC−3 | Hulk 42'; Guga (yellow card) 61'; Canobbio (yellow card) 63'; Acosta (yellow card) 79'; Serna 85'; Cano 90+2' | Report | Gómez 10', (yellow card) 90+5'; Piquerez (yellow card) 34'; Arthur (yellow card) 73'; Maurício 82' | Stadium: Maracanã; Attendance: 20,265; Referee: Anderson Daronco (Rio Grande do Sul) |

| 23 August 2026 24 | Palmeiras | 4–1 | Vasco | São Paulo |
| 16:00 UTC−3 | Marlon Freitas (yellow card) 9'; López 47', 89'; Vitor Roque 51' (pen.); Maurício 56' | Report | Gómez (yellow card) 44'; Thiago Mendes (yellow card) 50'; Robert Renan (yellow card) 83'; Colidio 90+4' | Stadium: Nubank Parque; Attendance: 36,382; Referee: Bráulio da Silva Machado (Santa Catarina) |

| 30 August 2026 25 | Mirassol | 1–1 | Palmeiras | Mirassol |
| 18:30 UTC−3 | Eduardo 50'; Denilson (yellow card) 85' | Report | Maurício 75'; Arthur (yellow card) 90+6' (yellow-red card) 90+8' | Stadium: Estádio José Maria de Campos Maia; Attendance: 10,599; Referee: João Vitor Gobi (São Paulo) |

| 6 September 2026 26 | Botafogo | 0–0 | Palmeiras | Rio de Janeiro |
| 18:30 UTC−3 | Arthur Cabral (yellow card) 20'; Marçal (yellow card) 24'; Montoro (yellow card) 76' | Report | Barboza (yellow card) 19' (yellow-red card) 90+3'; Marlon Freitas (yellow card) 77' | Stadium: Estádio Olímpico Nilton Santos; Attendance: 16,981; Referee: Rodrigo José Pereira de Lima (Pernambuco) |

| 12 September 2026 27 | Palmeiras | 2–0 | São Paulo | São Paulo |
| 18:30 UTC−3 | Murilo 45+1', (yellow card) 77'; Gómez (yellow card) 45+4'; Giay (yellow card) 45+5'; Vitor Roque 51'; Larson (yellow card) 87' | Report | Pablo Maia (yellow card) 12'; Luis Osorio (red card) 40' | Stadium: Nubank Parque; Attendance: 29,866; Referee: Rafael Rodrigo Klein (Rio Grande do Sul) |

| 20 September 2026 28 | Grêmio | 0–0 | Palmeiras | Porto Alegre |
| 11:00 UTC−3 | Noriega (yellow card) 41'; João Pedro (yellow card) 64'; Carlos Vinícius (yellow card) 68'; Gustavo Martins (yellow card) 69'; Pedro Gabriel (yellow card) 89' | Report | Giay (yellow card) 33'; Barboza (yellow card) 73'; Piquerez (yellow card) 77'; Lucas Evangelista (yellow card) 79'; Sosa (yellow card) 89' | Stadium: Arena do Grêmio; Attendance: 50,694; Referee: Paulo Cesar Zanovelli da Silva (Minas Gerais) |

| 8 October 2026 29 | Palmeiras | 1–0 | Bahia | São Paulo |
| 21:30 UTC−3 | López 7'; Khellven (yellow card) 55' | Report | Acevedo (yellow card) 61'; Jean Lucas (yellow card) 87' | Stadium: Nubank Parque; Attendance: 27,135; Referee: Bráulio da Silva Machado (Santa Catarina) |

| 11 October 2026 30 | Palmeiras | 4–1 | Corinthians | São Paulo |
| 17:30 UTC−3 | Arias (yellow card) 9'; Barboza 16'; Giay 45+1', 51', (yellow card) 49'; Matheus Bidu 46' (o.g.); Gómez (yellow card) 72' | Report | Raniele (yellow card) 14'; Depay (yellow card) 49'; Gabriel Paulista (yellow card) 59'; Vitinho (yellow card) 65'; Gustavo Henrique 90+1' | Stadium: Nubank Parque; Attendance: 30,112; Referee: Anderson Daronco (Rio Grande do Sul) |

| 17 October 2026 31 | Athletico Paranaense | 0–2 | Palmeiras | Curitiba |
| 19:30 UTC−3 | Gilberto (yellow card) 9'; Leozinho (yellow card) 57' | Report | Maurício 6'; Piquerez 10', (yellow card) 36'; Andreas Pereira (yellow card) 23' (yellow-red card) 43' | Stadium: Arena da Baixada; Attendance: 35,852; Referee: Paulo Cesar Zanovelli da Silva (Minas Gerais) |

| 24 October 2026 32 | Palmeiras | 2–0 | Red Bull Bragantino | Barueri |
| 18:30 UTC−3 | Maurício 45+11' (pen.); Gómez (yellow card) 62'; Giay 77', (yellow card) 79' | Report | Volpi (yellow card) 31'; Herrera (yellow card) 44'; Gabriel (yellow card) 81'; Alix Vinicius (yellow card) 81' | Stadium: Arena Barueri; Attendance: 26,021; Referee: Bráulio da Silva Machado (Santa Catarina) |

| 28 October 2026 33 | Santos | 0–0 | Palmeiras | Santos |
| 19:30 UTC−3 | Philippe Coutinho (yellow card) 38'; Bontempo (yellow card) 78'; João Schmidt (yellow card) 87' | Report | Marlon Freitas (yellow card) 38'; Piquerez (yellow card) 60'; Barboza (yellow card) 67'; Giay (yellow card) 84' | Stadium: Vila Belmiro; Attendance: 13,655; Referee: Flávio Rodrigues de Souza (São Paulo) |

| 5 November 2026 34 | Palmeiras | 6–1 | Remo | São Paulo |
| 19:30 UTC−3 | Arias 4', 14'; Maurício 21'; Marcelinho 36' (o.g.); López 55'; Felipe Anderson 80' | Report | Zé Welison 45+2'; Marllon (yellow card) 53'; Zé Ivaldo (yellow card) 60'; Marcelinho (yellow card) 66'; Edson Fernando (yellow card) 85' | Stadium: Nubank Parque; Attendance: 33,520; Referee: Wilton Pereira Sampaio (Goiás) |

| 18 November 2026 35 | Cruzeiro | 2–1 | Palmeiras | Belo Horizonte |
| 20:30 UTC−3 | Kaio Jorge (yellow card) 45'; Gérson (yellow card) 62'; Matheus Pereira 74', (yellow card) 90+5'; Khellven 77' (o.g.); Matheus Henrique (yellow card) 90' | Report | Barboza (yellow card) 32'; Sosa (yellow card) 39', (goal) 46'; Vitor Roque (yellow card) 59'; Bruno Fuchs (yellow card) 90+5' | Stadium: Mineirão; Attendance: 49,664; Referee: Anderson Daronco (Rio Grande do Sul) |

| 21 November 2026 36 | Palmeiras | 1–1 | Flamengo | São Paulo |
| 16:30 UTC−3 | Arias 12'; Andreas Pereira (yellow card) 43'; Carlos Miguel (yellow card) 77'; Arthur (yellow card) 80'; Lucas Evangelista (yellow card) 83' | Report | Alex Sandro (yellow card) 45+2'; Samuel Lino 76', (yellow card) 77' | Stadium: Nubank Parque; Attendance: 38,631; Referee: Rodrigo José Pereira de Lima (Pernambuco) |

| 24 November 2026 37 | Chapecoense | v | Palmeiras | Chapecó |
| 18:00 UTC−3 | | Report | | Stadium: Arena Condá |

| 2 December 2026 38 | Palmeiras | v | Coritiba | São Paulo |
| 21:30 UTC−3 | | Report | | Stadium: Nubank Parque |

=== Copa Libertadores ===
==== Group stage ====
The draw was held on 19 March 2026.

| Pos | Team | Pld | W | D | L | GF | GA | GD | Pts | Qualification |
|---|---|---|---|---|---|---|---|---|---|---|
| 1 | (Paraguay) Cerro Porteño | 6 | 4 | 1 | 1 | 6 | 2 | +4 | 13 | Advance to round of 16 |
| 2 | (Brazil) Palmeiras | 6 | 3 | 2 | 1 | 10 | 5 | +5 | 11 | Advance to round of 16 |
| 3 | (Peru) Sporting Cristal | 6 | 2 | 0 | 4 | 6 | 9 | −3 | 6 | Transfer to Copa Sudamericana |
| 4 | (Colombia) Junior | 6 | 1 | 1 | 4 | 5 | 11 | −6 | 4 | |

Source: CONMEBOL
Rules for classification: 1) Points; 2) Head-to-head points; 3) Head-to-head goal difference; 4) Head-to-head goals scored; 5) Goal difference; 6) Goals scored; 7) Red cards; 8) Yellow cards; 9) Drawing of lots.

| 8 April 2026 1 | Junior (Colombia) | 1–1 | (Brazil) Palmeiras | Cartagena, Colombia |
| 21:30 UTC−3 | Gutiérrez 10' (pen.), (yellow card) 42'; Pérez (yellow card) 14'; Paiva (yellow card) 83' | Report | Arthur (yellow card) 44'; Sosa 56' | Stadium: Estadio Jaime Morón León; Referee: Maximiliano Ramírez (Argentina) |

| 16 April 2026 2 | Palmeiras (Brazil) | 2–1 | (Peru) Sporting Cristal | São Paulo |
| 19:00 UTC−3 | Murilo 27'; López 80' (pen.) | Report | J. González 41'; S. González (yellow card) 73'; Enríquez (yellow card) 79'; Felipe Vizeu (yellow card) 90+3' | Stadium: Allianz Parque; Attendance: 35,118; Referee: Piero Maza (Chile) |

| 29 April 2026 3 | Cerro Porteño (Paraguay) | 1–1 | (Brazil) Palmeiras | Asunción, Paraguay |
| 21:30 UTC−3 | Carlos Miguel 72' (o.g.); Iturbe (yellow card) 90+4' | Report | Allan (yellow card) 20'; Arias 33' | Stadium: Estadio General Pablo Rojas; Referee: Gustavo Tejera (Uruguay) |

| 5 May 2026 4 | Sporting Cristal (Peru) | 0–2 | (Brazil) Palmeiras | Lima, Peru |
| 19:00 UTC−3 | Ávila (yellow card) 30'; Távara (yellow card) 47' | Report | Gómez (yellow card) 18'; López 32'; Sosa 50'; Giay (yellow card) 76' | Stadium: Alejandro Villanueva Stadium; Referee: Darío Herrera (Argentina) |

| 20 May 2026 5 | Palmeiras (Brazil) | 0–1 | (Paraguay) Cerro Porteño | São Paulo |
| 21:30 UTC−3 | Arthur (yellow card) 68'; Andreas Pereira (yellow card) 84'; Gómez (yellow card) 89' | Report | Piris da Motta (yellow card) 45+3'; Vegetti 48'; Morel (yellow card) 60'; Benítez (yellow card) 61' | Stadium: Nubank Parque; Attendance: 32,873; Referee: Yael Falcón Pérez (Argentina) |

| 28 May 2026 6 | Palmeiras (Brazil) | 4–1 | (Colombia) Junior | São Paulo |
| 19:00 UTC−3 | Arias 6', 45'; Allan 40'; Andreas Pereira 51' | Report | Chará (yellow card) 16'; Pestaña (yellow card) 29'; Muriel 36'; Ríos (yellow card) 79' | Stadium: Nubank Parque; Attendance: 35,761; Referee: Cristian Garay (Chile) |

==== Round of 16 ====
The draw was held on 29 May 2026.

| 12 August 2026 First leg | Palmeiras (Brazil) | 1–1 | (Paraguay) Cerro Porteño | São Paulo |
| 19:00 UTC−3 | Andreas Pereira (red card) 73'; López 82' | Report | Domínguez (yellow card) 40'; Chaparro (yellow card) 49'; Cañete (yellow card) 57'; Morel (yellow card) 86'; Carlos Miguel 90+3' (o.g.); Bobadilla (yellow card) 90+5' | Stadium: Nubank Parque; Attendance: 39,260; Referee: Gustavo Tejera (Uruguay) |

| 19 August 2026 Second leg | Cerro Porteño (Paraguay) | 0–1 (1–2 agg.) | (Brazil) Palmeiras | Asunción, Paraguay |
| 19:00 UTC−3 | Domínguez (yellow card) 52'; Morel (yellow card) 90+2' | Report | Gómez 41'; López (yellow card) 53' | Stadium: Estadio General Pablo Rojas; Referee: Facundo Tello (Argentina) |

==== Quarter-finals ====
| 9 September 2026 First leg | Palmeiras (Brazil) | 1–0 | (Ecuador) LDU Quito | São Paulo |
| 19:00 UTC−3 | Giay 26'; Gómez (yellow card) 44'; Bruno Fuchs (yellow card) 90'; Lucas Evangelista (yellow card) 90+3' | Report | Estrada (yellow card) 12'; Cornejo (yellow card) 22'; Quiñónez (yellow card) 32'; Allala (yellow card) 73' | Stadium: Nubank Parque; Attendance: 38,458; Referee: Jesús Valenzuela (Venezuela) |

| 16 September 2026 Second leg | LDU Quito (Ecuador) | 3–2 (3–3 agg.) (3–4 p) | (Brazil) Palmeiras | Quito, Ecuador |
| 19:00 UTC−3 | Segovia 15'; J. Rodríguez (yellow card) 68'; Estrada 90', 90+3', (yellow card) 90+5' | Report | Marlon Freitas 10'; López (yellow card) 61'; Vitor Roque 73' (pen.) | Stadium: Estadio Rodrigo Paz Delgado; Referee: Wílmar Roldán (Colombia) |
| | Penalties |
| | Deyverson (penalty scored); L. Rodríguez (penalty missed); Estrada (penalty scored); Cornejo (penalty scored); Segovia (penalty missed) | | (penalty scored) Vitor Roque; (penalty scored) Maurício; (penalty scored) Piquerez; (penalty missed) Lucas Evangelista; (penalty scored) Felipe Anderson |

==== Semi-finals ====
| 14 October 2026 First leg | Fluminense (Brazil) | 1–2 | (Brazil) Palmeiras | Rio de Janeiro |
| 21:30 UTC−3 | Wesley Natã 90+3'; Nonato (yellow card) 90+6' | Report | López 45'; Barboza (yellow card) 49'; Marlon Freitas 85'; Maurício (yellow card) 90+6'; Giay (yellow card) 90+6' | Stadium: Maracanã; Attendance: 69,039; Referee: Facundo Tello (Argentina) |

| 21 October 2026 Second leg | Palmeiras (Brazil) | 0–1 (2–2 agg.) (5–3 p) | (Brazil) Fluminense | São Paulo |
| 21:30 UTC−3 | Barboza (yellow card) 49'; Arias (yellow card) 76' | Report | Hércules (yellow card) 56', (goal) 82' | Stadium: Nubank Parque; Attendance: 40,425; Referee: Esteban Ostojich (Uruguay) |
| | Penalties |
| | Maurício (penalty scored); Gómez (penalty scored); Sosa (penalty scored); Piquerez (penalty scored); Marlon Freitas (penalty scored) | | (penalty scored) Thiago Silva; (penalty scored) Hércules; (penalty scored) Guilherme Arana; (penalty missed) Nonato |

==== Final ====
| 28 November 2026 | Palmeiras (Brazil) | v | (Argentina) Estudiantes | Montevideo, Uruguay |
| 17:00 UTC−3 | | | | Stadium: Estadio Centenario; Referee: Jesús Valenzuela (Venezuela) |

=== Copa do Brasil ===
==== Fifth round ====
The draw was held on 23 March 2026.

| 23 April 2026 First leg | Palmeiras (São Paulo (state)) | 3–0 | (Bahia) Jacuipense | São Paulo |
| 19:30 UTC−3 | Sosa 9' (pen.), 55' (pen.); Lucas Evangelista (yellow card) 30'; Felipe Anderson 45+9' | Report | David Santana (yellow card) 8'; Vicente Reis (yellow card) 14'; Railon (yellow card) 32'; JP Talisca (red card) 36' | Stadium: Allianz Parque; Attendance: 22,562; Referee: Marcelo de Lima Henrique (Ceará) |

| 13 May 2026 Second leg | Jacuipense (Bahia) | 1–4 (1–7 agg.) | (São Paulo (state)) Palmeiras | Londrina |
| 21:30 UTC−3 | Daniel Costa (yellow card) 29'; Gabriel Pereira (yellow card) 55'; Vicente 88' | Report | Maurício 23'; Felipe Anderson 24'; Erick Belé 37'; Luighi 53' (pen.) | Stadium: Estádio do Café; Attendance: 16,628; Referee: Jonathan Benkenstein Pinheiro (Rio Grande do Sul) |

==== Round of 16 ====
The draw was held on 26 May 2026.

| 2 August 2026 First leg | Palmeiras (São Paulo (state)) | 3–0 | (Ceará) Fortaleza | São Paulo |
| 16:00 UTC−3 | Murilo (yellow card) 27'; Maurício 48'; Arias 64'; López 85' | Report | João Ricardo (yellow card) 43'; Fuentes (yellow card) 75' | Stadium: Nubank Parque; Attendance: 37,256; Referee: Rodrigo José Pereira de Lima (Pernambuco) |

| 5 August 2026 Second leg | Fortaleza (Ceará) | 3–2 (3–5 agg.) | (São Paulo (state)) Palmeiras | Cuiabá |
| 21:30 UTC−3 | Miritello 34'; Rodriguinho 44'; Maílton (yellow card) 70'; Lucas Emanoel 88' | Report | López 41'; Murilo 62' | Stadium: Arena Pantanal; Attendance: 15,186; Referee: Rafael Rodrigo Klein (Rio Grande do Sul) |

==== Quarter-finals ====
The draw was held on 11 August 2026.

| 26 August 2026 First leg | Palmeiras (São Paulo (state)) | 3–0 | (São Paulo (state)) Santos | São Paulo |
| 21:30 UTC−3 | López 34', 61'; Andreas Pereira 45', (yellow card) 77'; Barboza (yellow card) 90+1' | Report | Caballero (yellow card) 21'; Rony (yellow card) 79' | Stadium: Nubank Parque; Attendance: 40,698; Referee: Bruno Arleu de Araújo (Rio de Janeiro) |

| 2 September 2026 Second leg | Santos (São Paulo (state)) | 0–0 (0–3 agg.) | (São Paulo (state)) Palmeiras | Santos |
| 21:30 UTC−3 | Escobar (yellow card) 1'; Gabriel Bontempo (yellow card) 34'; Rafael Gonzaga (yellow card) 64'; Gabriel Barbosa (yellow card) 86' | Report | Felipe Anderson (yellow card) 1'; Giay (yellow card) 39'; Vitor Roque (yellow card) 64'; Luis Pacheco (yellow card) 89' | Stadium: Vila Belmiro; Attendance: 15,060; Referee: Davi de Oliveira Lacerda (Espírito Santo) |

==== Semi-finals ====
The draw to determine the order of the matches was held on 10 September 2026.

| 1 November 2026 First leg | Palmeiras (São Paulo (state)) | 1–0 | (Rio de Janeiro (state)) Vasco | São Paulo |
| 16:00 UTC−3 | Maurício 24'; Lucas Evangelista (yellow card) 45+1'; Barboza (yellow card) 67' | Report | Lescano (yellow card) 22'; Saldivia (yellow card) 30' (yellow-red card) 77'; Lucas Piton (yellow card) 37' | Stadium: Nubank Parque; Attendance: 40,570; Referee: Anderson Daronco (Rio Grande do Sul) |

| 8 November 2026 Second leg | Vasco (Rio de Janeiro (state)) | 2–1 (2–2 agg.) (4–5 p) | (São Paulo (state)) Palmeiras | Rio de Janeiro |
| 17:00 UTC−3 | Colidio 16'; Gabriel (yellow card) 20'; Thiago Mendes (yellow card) 25'; Daniel Fuzato (yellow card) 45+5'; Puma Rodríguez 76'; Gómez (yellow card) 83'; Cuiabano (yellow card) 90+3' | Report | Maurício (yellow card) 45+2'; Arias (yellow card) 45+6'; Piquerez 55'; Marcelo Lomba (yellow card) 60'; Barboza (yellow card) 84'; Marlon Freitas (yellow card) 88' | Stadium: São Januário; Attendance: 21,275; Referee: Bráulio da Silva Machado (Santa Catarina) |
| | Penalties |
| | Lescano (penalty missed); Thiago Mendes (penalty scored); Sosa (penalty scored); Colidio (penalty scored); Puma Rodríguez (penalty scored); Gómez (penalty missed) | | (penalty scored) Vitor Roque; (penalty scored) Gómez; (penalty scored) Sosa; (penalty scored) Andreas Pereira; (penalty missed) Giay; (penalty scored) Marlon Freitas |

==== Final ====
| 6 December 2026 | Grêmio (Rio Grande do Sul) | v | (São Paulo (state)) Palmeiras | Brasília |
| 17:00 UTC−3 | | Report | | Stadium: Mané Garrincha |

== Statistics ==
As of 21 November 2026

=== Overall statistics ===
| Games played | 68 (12 Campeonato Paulista, 36 Série A, 12 Copa Libertadores, 8 Copa do Brasil) |
| Games won | 41 (9 Campeonato Paulista, 21 Série A, 6 Copa Libertadores, 5 Copa do Brasil) |
| Games drawn | 15 (1 Campeonato Paulista, 11 Série A, 3 Copa Libertadores, 1 Copa do Brasil) |
| Games lost | 11 (2 Campeonato Paulista, 4 Série A, 3 Copa Libertadores, 2 Copa do Brasil) |
| Goals scored | 115 |
| Goals conceded | 52 |
| Goal difference | +65 (+8 Campeonato Paulista, +38 Série A, +6 Copa Libertadores, +11 Copa do Brasil) |
| Clean sheets | 31 |
| Most clean sheets | Carlos Miguel (31) |
| Best result | 6–1 (vs. Remo, Série A – 5 November) |
| Worst result | 0–4 (vs. Novorizontino, Campeonato Paulista – 20 January) |
| Yellow cards | 137 |
| Red cards | 6 |
| Top scorer | José Manuel López (24 goals) |

=== Goalscorers ===
In italic players who left the team in mid-season.

| Place | Position | Nationality | Number | Name | Campeonato Paulista | Série A | Copa Libertadores | Copa do Brasil | Total |
|---|---|---|---|---|---|---|---|---|---|
| 1 | FW | (Argentina) | 42 | López | 6 | 10 | 4 | 4 | 24 |
| 2 | MF | (Paraguay) | 18 | Maurício | 2 | 10 | 0 | 3 | 15 |
| 3 | FW | (Colombia) | 11 | Arias | 1 | 6 | 3 | 1 | 11 |
| 4 | FW | (Paraguay) | 19 | Sosa | 1 | 5 | 2 | 2 | 10 |
| 5 | FW | (Brazil) | 9 | Vitor Roque | 3 | 5 | 1 | 0 | 9 |
| 6 | FW | (Brazil) | 40 | Allan | 1 | 4 | 1 | 0 | 6 |
| 7 | DF | (Paraguay) | 15 | Gómez | 0 | 4 | 1 | 0 | 5 |
| 7 | DF | (Brazil) | 26 | Murilo | 1 | 2 | 1 | 1 | 5 |
| 7 | MF | (Brazil) | 7 | Felipe Anderson | 0 | 3 | 0 | 2 | 5 |
| 8 | MF | (Brazil) | 8 | Andreas Pereira | 1 | 1 | 1 | 1 | 4 |
| 8 | MF | (Brazil) | 17 | Marlon Freitas | 0 | 2 | 2 | 0 | 4 |
| 8 | DF | (Argentina) | 4 | Giay | 0 | 3 | 1 | 0 | 4 |
| 9 | FW | (Brazil) | 31 | Luighi | 1 | 0 | 0 | 1 | 2 |
| 9 | FW | (Brazil) | 10 | Paulinho | 0 | 2 | 0 | 0 | 2 |
| 9 | DF | (Uruguay) | 22 | Piquerez | 0 | 1 | 0 | 1 | 2 |
| 10 | DF | (Brazil) | 12 | Khellven | 1 | 0 | 0 | 0 | 1 |
| 10 | MF | (Brazil) | 45 | Erick Belé | 0 | 0 | 0 | 1 | 1 |
| 10 | DF | (Argentina) | 2 | Barboza | 0 | 1 | 0 | 0 | 1 |
