= Arthur Gabriel =

Brazilian footballer

- Arthur with Palmeiras in 2026

Personal information
- Full name: Arthur Gabriel Santana Marcolino
- Date of birth: 4 September 2005 (age 21)
- Place of birth: São Paulo, Brazil
- Height: 1.76 m (5 ft 9 in)
- Position: Left-back

Team information
- Current team: Palmeiras
- Number: 56

Youth career
- 2017–2026: Palmeiras

Senior career*
Years	Team	Apps	(Gls)
2026–	Palmeiras	24	(0)
- * Club domestic league appearances and goals as of 15:36, 30 October 2026 (UTC)

Arthur Gabriel Santana Marcolino (born 4 September 2005), known as Arthur Gabriel or simply Arthur, is a Brazilian professional footballer who plays as a left-back for Palmeiras.

== Club career ==
Born in São Paulo, Arthur joined the youth categories of Palmeiras in 2017, aged 11. On 5 August 2025, after establishing himself in the under-20 team, he renewed his contract until 2029.

On 12 January 2026, after Jefté suffered an injury, Arthur was registered in the first team squad for the 2026 Campeonato Paulista. He made his senior debut six days later, starting in a 1–0 home win over Mirassol.

== International career ==
In September 2025, Arthur was called up to the Brazil national under-20 team for a period of trainings.

== Career statistics ==
As of 30 October 2026

Appearances and goals by club, season and competition
Club	Season	League			Paulista		Copa do Brasil		Continental		Other		Total	
Club	Season	Division	Apps	Goals	Apps	Goals	Apps	Goals	Apps	Goals	Apps	Goals	Apps	Goals
Palmeiras	2026	Série A	23	0	1	0	4	0	7 (Note: Appearance(s) in Copa Libertadores)	0	—		35	0
Career total			23	0	1	0	4	0	7	0	0	0	35	0

== Honours ==
Palmeiras U17

- Campeonato Paulista Sub-17: 2022
- Campeonato Brasileiro Sub-17: 2022
- Copa do Brasil Sub-17: 2022

Palmeiras U20

- Campeonato Paulista Sub-20: 2023
- Campeonato Brasileiro Sub-20: 2024, 2025
