= Larson (footballer) =

Brazilian footballer (born 2005)

Personal information
- Full name: Larson Torna Ferreira dos Santos
- Date of birth: 10 July 2005 (age 21)
- Place of birth: Pelotas, Brazil
- Height: 1.83 m (6 ft 0 in)
- Position: Midfielder

Team information
- Current team: Palmeiras
- Number: 48

Youth career
- 2016–2020: Internacional
- 2021–2022: Brasil de Pelotas
- 2022–2025: Goiás
- 2025: → Palmeiras (loan)

Senior career*
Years	Team	Apps	(Gls)
2025–2026	Goiás	0	(0)
2025–2026	→ Palmeiras (loan)	5	(0)
2026–	Palmeiras	9	(0)
- * Club domestic league appearances and goals as of 15:38, 30 October 2026 (UTC)

Larson Torna Ferreira dos Santos (born 10 July 2005), simply known as Larson, is a Brazilian professional footballer who plays as a midfielder for Palmeiras.

== Club career ==
Born in Pelotas, Rio Grande do Sul and named after Henrik Larsson, Larson began his career at the age of eight in a local school, later moving to Internacional aged 11. Released in 2020, he subsequently joined hometown side Brasil de Pelotas before joining Goiás in 2022.

On 30 January 2025, Larson was loaned to Palmeiras for one year, being initially a member of the under-20 team. In October, he started to train with the first team, and made his professional – and Série A – debut with the club on 15 November, coming on as a late substitute for Maurício in a 1–0 away loss to Santos, as several key players were away on international duty.

On 27 January 2026, Palmeiras exercised the buyout clause on Larson's contract, with the player signing a contract until 2030.

== International career ==
On 26 September 2024, Larson was called up to the Brazil national under-20 team.

== Career statistics ==
As of 30 October 2026

Appearances and goals by club, season and competition
Club	Season	League			Paulista		Copa do Brasil		Continental		Other		Total	
Club	Season	Division	Apps	Goals	Apps	Goals	Apps	Goals	Apps	Goals	Apps	Goals	Apps	Goals
Palmeiras	2025	Série A	2	0	0	0	0	0	0	0	—		2	0
Palmeiras	2026	Série A	8	0	4	0	2	0	0	0	—		14	0
Career total			10	0	4	0	2	0	0	0	0	0	16	0

== Honours ==
Palmeiras U20

- Campeonato Brasileiro Sub-20: 2025
