= Carlos Miguel (footballer, born 1998) =

Brazilian footballer

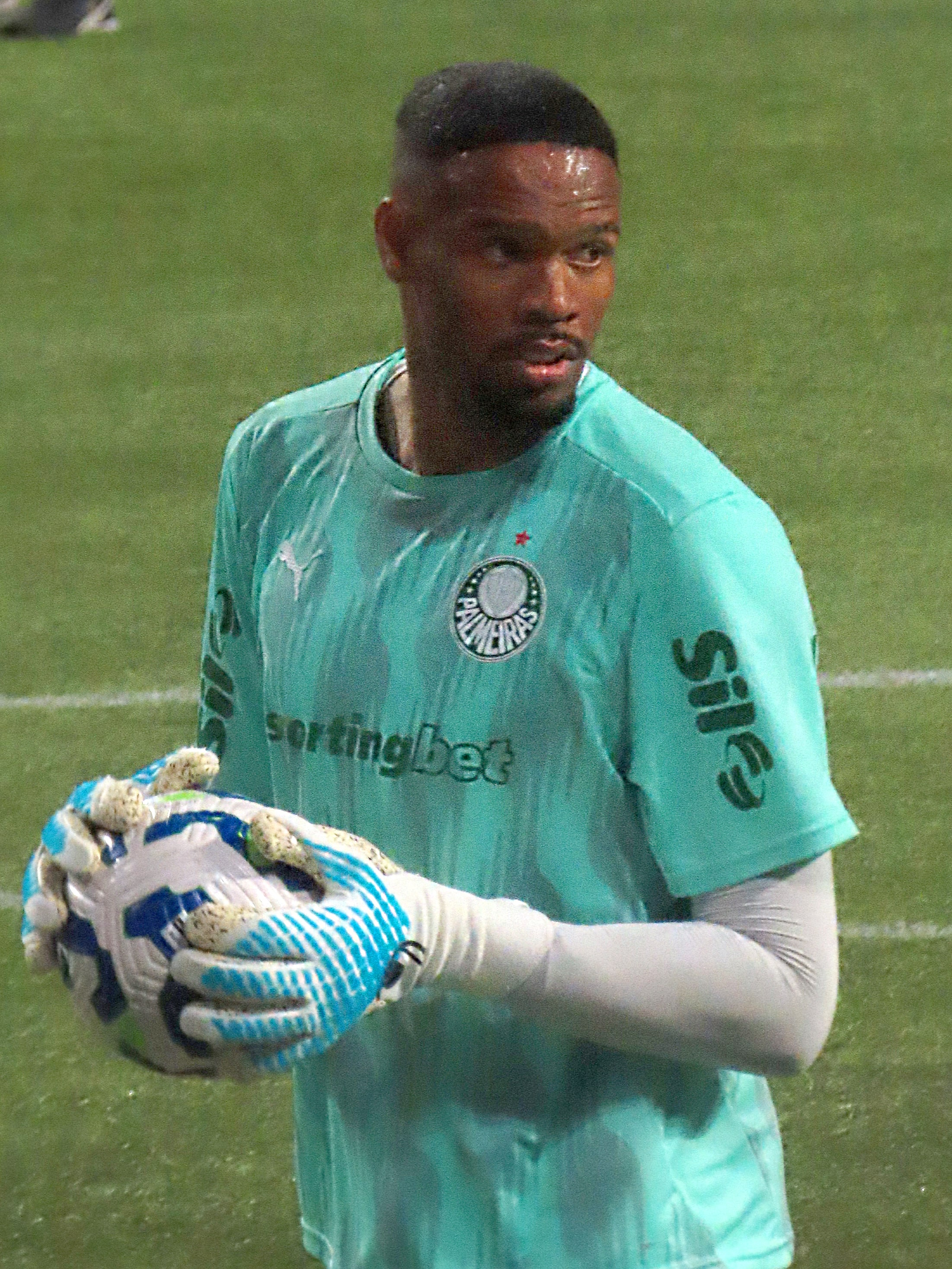
- Carlos Miguel with Palmeiras in 2025

Personal information
- Full name: Carlos Miguel dos Santos Pereira
- Date of birth: 9 October 1998 (age 28)
- Place of birth: Rio das Ostras, Brazil
- Height: 2.04 m (6 ft 8 in)
- Position: Goalkeeper

Team information
- Current team: Palmeiras
- Number: 1

Youth career
- 2015–2016: Flamengo
- 2016–2018: Internacional

Senior career*
Years	Team	Apps	(Gls)
2018–2021	Internacional	0	(0)
2020	→ Santa Cruz (loan)	0	(0)
2021	→ Boa Esporte (loan)	8	(0)
2021–2024	Corinthians	14	(0)
2024–2025	Nottingham Forest	0	(0)
2025–	Palmeiras	52	(0)
- * Club domestic league appearances and goals as of 23:59, 5 November 2026 (UTC)

Carlos Miguel dos Santos Pereira (born 9 October 1998), known as Carlos Miguel, is a Brazilian professional footballer who plays as a goalkeeper for Brasileiro Série A club Palmeiras.

== Club career ==
=== Internacional ===
Born in Rio das Ostras, Rio de Janeiro, Carlos Miguel began his career at Flamengo before joining Internacional's youth setup in 2016. On 9 December 2019, he was loaned to Santa Cruz for the season.

Carlos Miguel left Santa on 8 October 2020, after failing to make a single appearance, and moved to Boa Esporte also in a temporary deal on 20 January 2021. He made his senior debut on 12 March, starting in a 2–1 Campeonato Mineiro home win over Coimbra.

Carlos Miguel returned to Inter in April 2021, after eight appearances for Boa, but terminated his contract with the club on 11 August.

=== Corinthians ===
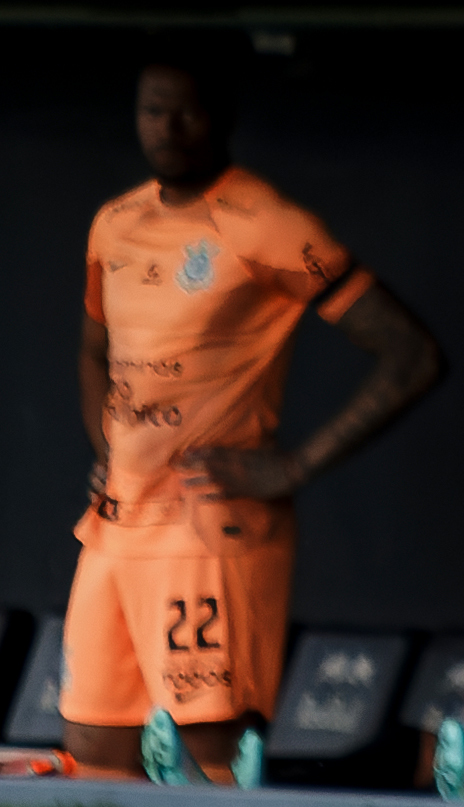
Carlos Miguel with Corinthians in 2023

On 27 August 2021, Carlos Miguel signed a contract with Corinthians until December 2023. Playing second-string to club legend Cássio, he made his first team – and Série A – debut on 24 July 2022, playing the full 90 minutes in a 2–1 away win over Atlético Mineiro.

=== Nottingham Forest ===
On 9 July 2024, Carlos Miguel signed for English Premier League club Nottingham Forest for around £3.4m.

=== Palmeiras ===
On 19 August 2025, after just one season in Nottingham Forest, where he didn't played a single league game, Carlos Miguel returned to Brazil to play for Palmeiras.

== Personal life ==
Carlos Miguel's father José Cláudio was also a footballer and a goalkeeper. He represented Botafogo in the 1970s before being murdered in Macaé when Carlos Miguel was seven. His brother Júnior also played football as a youth.

== Career statistics ==
As of 8 November 2026

Appearances and goals by club, season and competition
Club	Season	League			State league (Note: Includes Campeonato Mineiro, Campeonato Paulista)		National cup (Note: Includes Copa do Brasil, FA Cup)		League cup (Note: Includes EFL Cup)		Continental		Total	
Club	Season	Division	Apps	Goals	Apps	Goals	Apps	Goals	Apps	Goals	Apps	Goals	Apps	Goals
Santa Cruz	2020	Série C	0	0	0	0	0	0	—		—		0	0
Boa Esporte	2021	Série D	0	0	8	0	—		—		—		8	0
Corinthians	2021	Série A	0	0	—		0	0	—		—		0	0
Corinthians	2022	Série A	2	0	0	0	0	0	—		0	0	2	0
Corinthians	2023	Série A	2	0	2	0	0	0	—		5 (Note: Two appearances in Copa Libertadores, three appearances in Copa Sudamericana)	0	9	0
Corinthians	2024	Série A	6	0	2	0	3	0	—		3 (Note: Appearances in Copa Sudamericana)	0	14	0
Corinthians	Total		10	0	4	0	3	0	—		8	0	25	0
Nottingham Forest	2024–25	Premier League	0	0	—		2	0	1	0	—		3	0
Palmeiras	2025	Série A	9	0	—		—		—		3 (Note: Appearances in Copa Libertadores)	0	12	0
Palmeiras	2026	Série A	33	0	10	0	7	0	—		12	0	62	0
Palmeiras	Total		42	0	10	0	7	0	—		15	0	74	0
Career total			52	0	22	0	12	0	1	0	23	0	110	0

== Honours ==
Corinthians

- Copa do Brasil runner-up: 2022

Palmeiras

- Campeonato Paulista: 2026
- Copa Libertadores runner-up: 2025
- Campeonato Brasileiro Série A runner-up: 2025

=== Individual ===
- Campeonato Paulista Team of the Year: 2026
