= Agustín Giay =

Argentine footballer

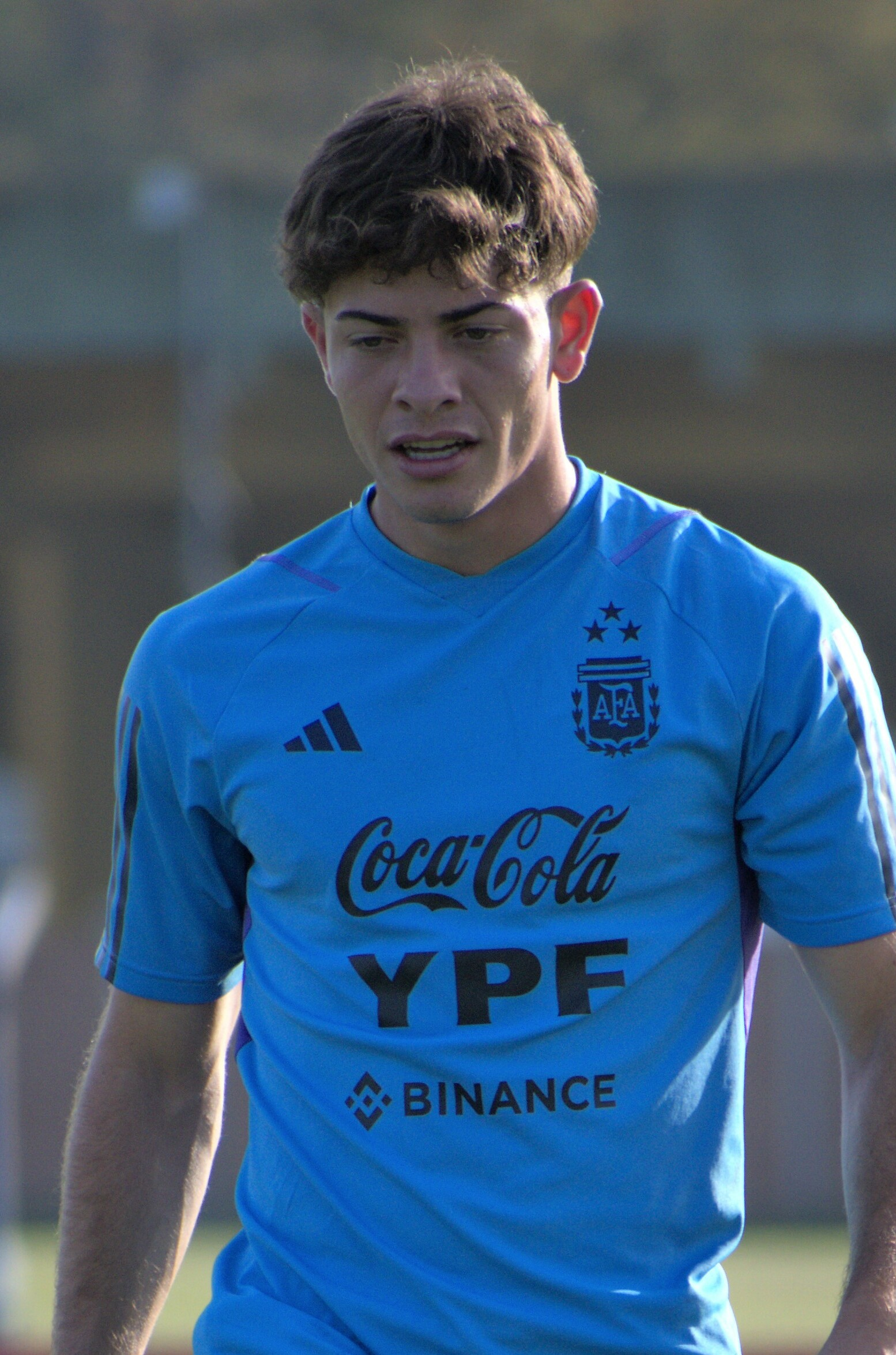
- Giay with Argentina U20 in 2023

Personal information
- Full name: Agustín Giay
- Date of birth: 16 January 2004 (age 22)
- Place of birth: San Carlos Centro, Argentina
- Height: 1.80 m (5 ft 11 in)
- Position: Right-back

Team information
- Current team: Palmeiras
- Number: 4

Youth career
- until 2017: Argentino de San Carlos
- 2017–2022: San Lorenzo

Senior career*
Years	Team	Apps	(Gls)
2022–2024	San Lorenzo	66	(2)
2024–	Palmeiras	74	(3)

International career^{‡}
- Argentina U15
2022–2023	Argentina U20	6	(0)
2026–	Argentina	5	(0)
- * Club domestic league appearances and goals as of 5 November 2026 ‡ National team caps and goals as of 3 October 2026

Agustín Giay (born 16 January 2004) is an Argentine professional footballer who plays as a right-back for Campeonato Brasileiro Série A club Palmeiras and the Argentina national team.

== Early life ==
Born in San Carlos Centro, Giay joined San Lorenzo's youth wing at 13.

== Club career ==
=== Club Argentino de San Carlos ===
He completed most of his football training at Argentino de San Carlos, the club he openly supports. He stood out for his performances and skill in the youth divisions of the Liga Santafesina de Fútbol (the league in which Argentino de San Carlos competed during those years, before transferring its affiliation to the Liga Esperancina de Fútbol in 2023). At the age of thirteen, he was selected after a player tryout held by San Lorenzo de Almagro in his hometown in 2017. He moved to Buenos Aires and, while living at San Lorenzo's residence, began his career, also making appearances for the national youth teams.

Agustín Giay has a very close relationship with Argentino de San Carlos, so much so that during preseason weeks when he is not playing (generally in January), he often trains with the club's squad at their facilities.

=== Club San Lorenzo ===
Giay made his professional debut for San Lorenzo on 19 April 2022, starting in the 1–2 away Copa de la Liga win to CA Unión.

He scored his first goal for the club on 9 July 2022 during a Primera División home game against the Boca Juniors, helping his team to a 2–1 surprise win. Along with the likes of Agustín Martegani, Giay was part of a youthful but promising San Lorenzo squad.

==== Disappearance of 10% of the pass ====
In the 2021/22 Balance sheet officially presented by San Lorenzo on June 13, 2023, it appeared that the Argentine institution owned 90% of Agustín Giay's pass, leaving the remaining 10% lost to complete the 100. This data caught attention to the Ciclón fans, because Agustín (being a youth member of the club) had not previously been part of another professional entity which could be the owner of the mysteriously missing percentage. This event was then sued by Movete Boedo Movete (the club's fan movement) to the General Inspection of Justice, who said that serious property damage was caused to the club. It is worth mentioning that the 2020/21 Balance Sheet (the previous one) included absolute possession of the entire player's record, which was lost over the course of those two years. This had already happened to the Cuervo directors, at the time with Bautista Merlini and they themselves argued that it was a "typing error."

=== Sociedade Palmeiras ===
On 28 June 2024, Giay signed for SE Palmeiras in the Brasileirão on a deal until June 2029

== International career ==
=== Argentina U-15 ===
In 2019 he played and won the Vlatko Marković International Tournament held in Croatia.

That same year he participated at the 2019 South American U-15 Championship in Paraguay where Argentina finished second.

=== Argentina U-20 ===
He started in friendly match against the United States.

Later, in 2022 he was called to play the Maurice Revello tournament, where the Argentina U-20 team finished in the fifth place.

The seventh of August 2022 he won the L'Alcudia tournament whilst being the captain of the team and beating Uruguay U-20 by 4 goals. He scored the first goal in the eighth minute of the match.

He played the 2023 FIFA U-20 World Cup held in Argentina and was the captain for his team making 4 appearances and losing in the round of 16 against Nigeria.

== Career statistics ==
=== Club ===
As of match played 8 November 2026

Appearances and goals by club, season and competition
Club	Season	League			State league (Note: Includes Campeonato Paulista)		National cup (Note: Includes Copa Argentina, Copa do Brasil)		South america		Other		Total	
Club	Season	Division	Apps	Goals	Apps	Goals	Apps	Goals	Apps	Goals	Apps	Goals	Apps	Goals
San Lorenzo	2022	Primera División	23	1	—		—		—		—		23	1
San Lorenzo	2023	Primera División	27	0	—		5	0	9 (Note: Appearances in Copa Sudamericana)	0	—		41	0
San Lorenzo	2024	Primera División	16	1	—		2	0	6 (Note: Appearance(s) in Copa Libertadores)	0	—		24	1
San Lorenzo	Total		66	2	—		7	0	15	0	—		88	2
Palmeiras	2024	Série A	10	0	—		1	0	1	0	—		12	0
Palmeiras	2025	Série A	29	0	4	0	4	0	8	0	4 (Note: Appearances in FIFA Club World Cup)	0	49	0
Palmeiras	2026	Série A	26	3	5	0	5	0	11	1	—		47	4
Palmeiras	Total		65	3	9	0	10	0	20	1	4	0	108	4
Career total			131	5	9	0	17	0	35	1	4	0	196	6

=== International ===
As of match played 3 October 2026

Appearances and goals by national team and year
National team	Year	Apps	Goals
Argentina	2026	5	0
Total		5	0

== Honours ==
Palmeiras

- Campeonato Paulista: 2026

Argentina U20

- L'Alcúdia International Football Tournament: 2022
