= Allan (footballer, born 2004) =

Brazilian footballer

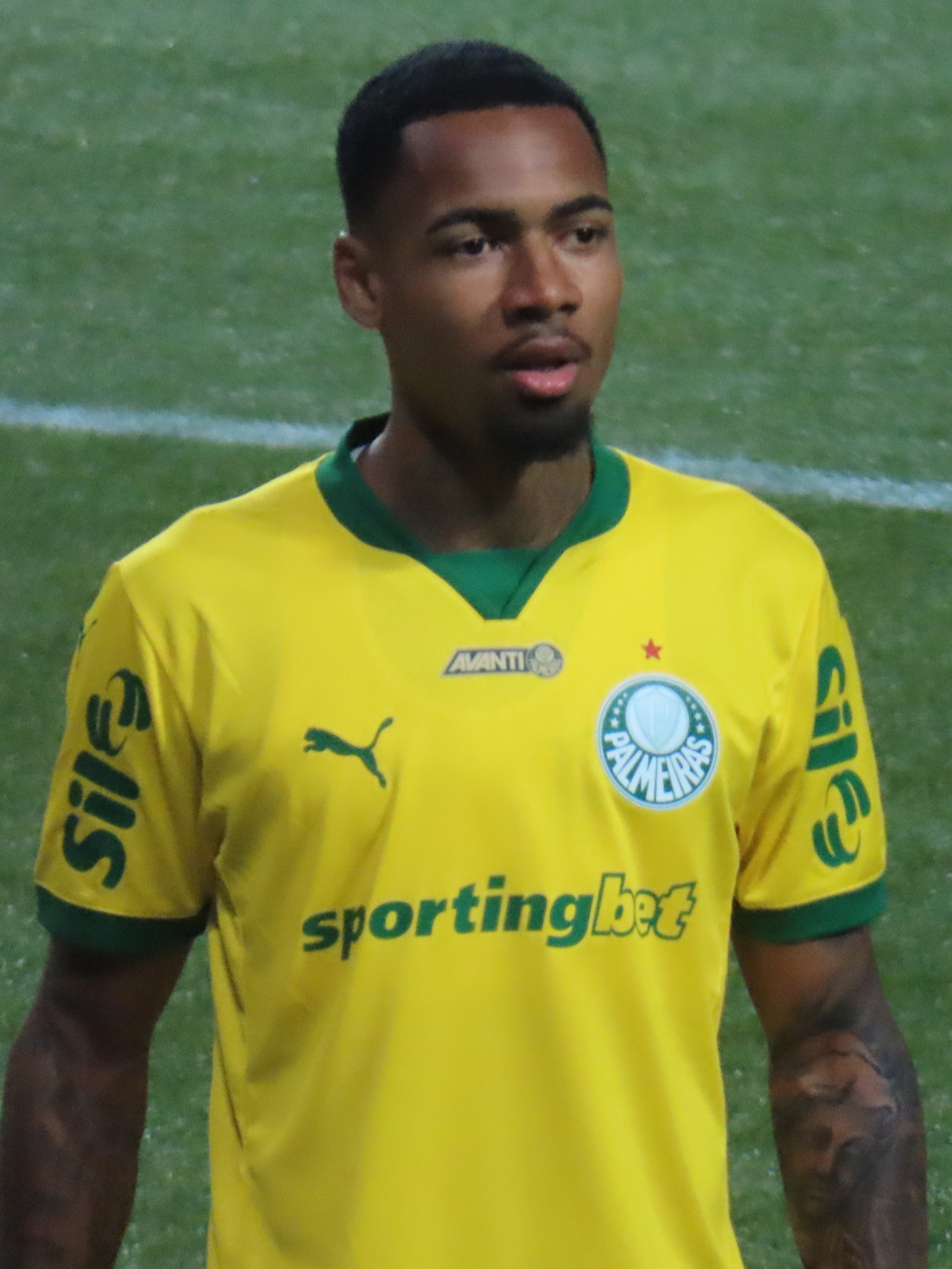
- Allan with Palmeiras in 2025

Personal information
- Full name: Allan Andrade Elias
- Date of birth: 19 April 2004 (age 22)
- Place of birth: Florianópolis, Brazil
- Height: 1.76 m (5 ft 9 in)
- Positions: Attacking midfielder; winger

Team information
- Current team: Manchester City
- Number: 37

Youth career
- 2018: Figueirense
- 2019–2025: Palmeiras

Senior career*
Years	Team	Apps	(Gls)
2025–2026	Palmeiras	69	(8)
2026–	Manchester City	3	(0)

International career
2026–	Brazil	1	(0)
- * Club domestic league appearances and goals as of 23:50, 11 October 2026 (UTC)

Allan Andrade Elias (born 19 April 2004), known as Allan Elias or just Allan, is a Brazilian professional footballer who plays as an attacking midfielder or a winger for Premier League club Manchester City and the Brazil national team.

== Career ==
=== Early career ===
Born in Florianópolis, Santa Catarina, Allan Elias joined Palmeiras' youth sides in 2019, from hometown side Figueirense; the club acquired 70% of his economic rights. He renewed his contract until 2027 with the club on 13 December 2024.

=== Palmeiras ===
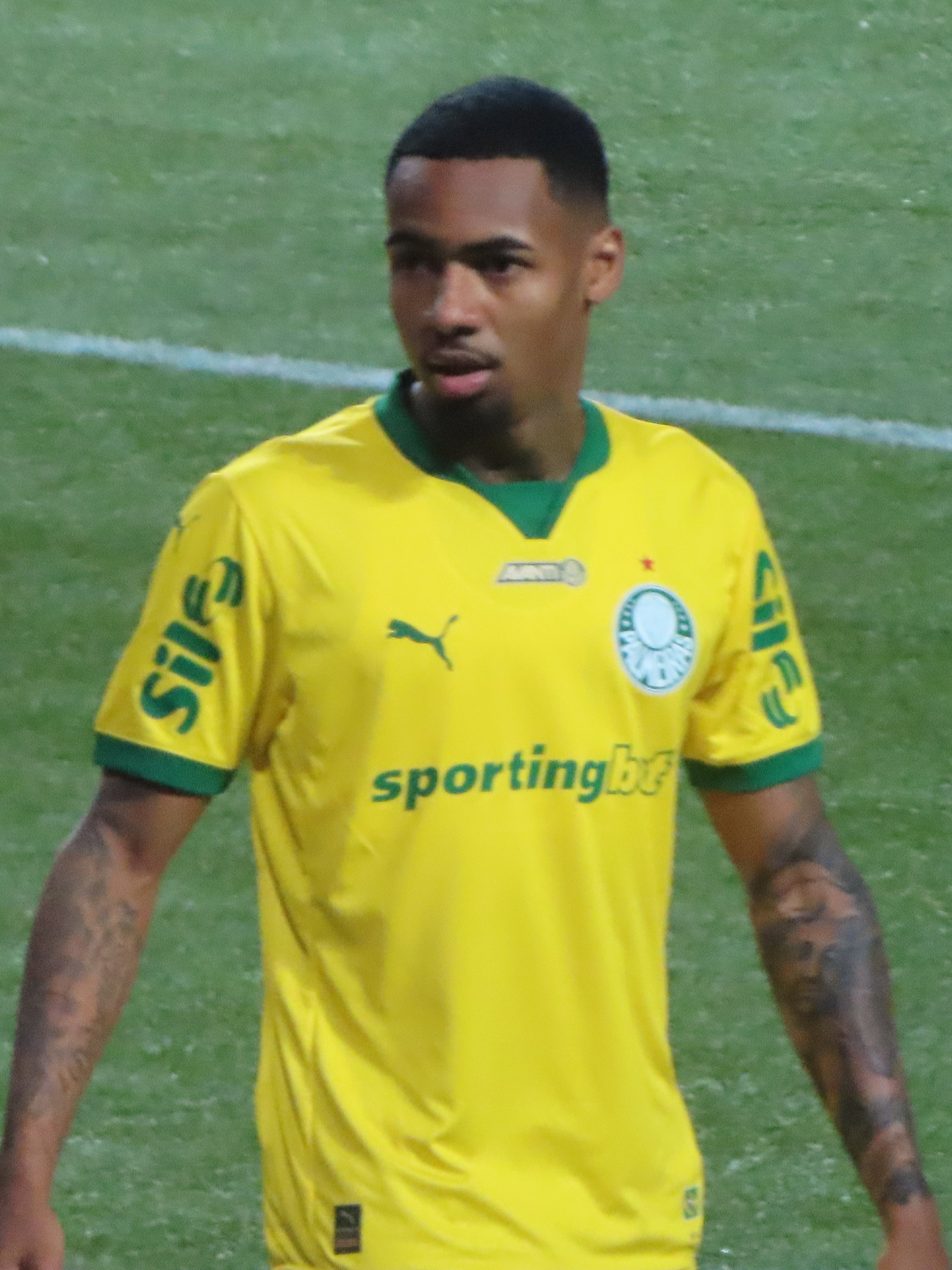
Allan playing for Palmeiras in 2025

Promoted to the main squad in January 2025, Allan made his first team debut for Verdão on the 16th of that month, coming on as a late substitute for Rômulo in a 2–0 Campeonato Paulista home win over Portuguesa. He scored his first professional goal on 23 February, netting his side's third in a 3–2 away win over Mirassol which qualified the club to the knockout stage of the Paulistão.

Allan made his Série A debut on 16 April 2025, replacing Felipe Anderson in a 1–0 away win over Internacional. He scored his first goal in the category on 1 June, but in a 2–1 away loss to Cruzeiro, and renewed his contract until 2029 six days later, with the club also buying 20% of his economic rights from Figueirense for a rumoured fee of R$ 1.6 million.

Allan continued to feature regularly afterwards, and was named the Bola de Prata Breakthrough Player in the end of the 2025 season.

On 26 August 2026, with a departure set, Allan was honoured by Palmeiras president Leila Pereira and was cheered by the supporters before a match against Santos; he totalled 96 appearances for the club, scoring nine goals and providing 12 assists.

=== Manchester City ===
On 31 August 2026, Premier League club Manchester City confirmed the signing of Allan on a five-year contract in a deal reportedly worth up to £34.2 million. He debuted with a goal and an assist for City on 17 September, at the Etihad Stadium, helping the team in a 5-0 victory over Norwich City in the EFL Cup.

== International career ==
On 29 October 2026, Allan was called up to the Brazil national team by Carlo Ancelotti for two friendlies against Japan and Singapore. Allan marked his international debut against Singapore on 17 November 2026, coming on as a substitute in the 59th minute. He recorded his first assist in that match, assisting Rayan in the 65th minute. He also had a shot deflected by a Singaporean defender which resulted on an own goal, the 7th for Brazil on a 7-0 win. It was initially registered by the Brazilian TV transmission as a goal from Allan, but later atributed as an own goal.

== Style of play ==
Mainly an attacking midfielder or a winger, Allan is also capable of playing as a central midfielder. Described as a "very vertical" player by head coach Abel Ferreira, he impresses for his dribbling and his defensive work rate.

== Career statistics ==
As of match played 20 October 2026

Appearances and goals by club, season and competition
Club	Season	League			State league (Note: Includes Campeonato Paulista)		National cup (Note: Includes Copa do Brasil, FA Cup)		League cup (Note: Includes EFL Cup)		Continental		Other		Total	
Club	Season	Division	Apps	Goals	Apps	Goals	Apps	Goals	Apps	Goals	Apps	Goals	Apps	Goals	Apps	Goals
Palmeiras	2025	Série A	28	2	9	1	2	0	—		11 (Note: Appearances in Copa Libertadores)	0	4 (Note: Appearances in FIFA Club World Cup)	0	54	3
Palmeiras	2026	Série A	21	4	11	1	2	0	—		8	1	—		42	6
Palmeiras	Total		49	6	20	2	4	0	—		19	1	4	0	96	9
Manchester City	2026–27	Premier League	3	0	—		0	0	1	1	2 (Note: Appearance in UEFA Champions League)	0	—		6	1
Career total			52	6	20	2	4	0	1	1	21	1	4	0	102	10

== Honours ==
Palmeiras U20

- Campeonato Brasileiro Sub-20: 2022, 2024
- Copa do Brasil Sub-20: 2022
- Copa São Paulo de Futebol Júnior: 2023
- Campeonato Paulista Sub-20: 2023

Palmeiras

- Campeonato Paulista: 2026

Individual

- Bola de Prata Breakthrough Player: 2025
