= Marcos Pereira (footballer, born 1975) =

Brazilian footballer

Personal information
- Full name: Marcos Antônio Pereira
- Date of birth: 2 April 1975 (age 51)
- Place of birth: Sertaneja, Brazil
- Height: 1.75 m (5 ft 9 in)
- Position: Forward

Senior career*
Years	Team	Apps	(Gls)
1992	Inter de Limeira		
1992	KFC Putte		
1992–1996	Mechelen		
1992	→ Lierse (loan)		
1996–1999	Zwarte Leeuw		
1999–2001	Maasmechelen		
2001–2004	Sint-Truidense	46	(10)
2004	Royal Antwerp	5	(0)
2004–2010	Lommel United	90	(31)
2010	Overpeltse VV	10	(1)
Total		151	(42)

Managerial career
- 2010: Overpeltse VV (assistant)
- * Club domestic league appearances and goals

Marcos Antônio Pereira (born 2 April 1975) is a Brazilian retired footballer who played as a forward. After starting his career at Internacional de Limeira, he went on to play for several Belgian Pro League clubs, including K.V. Mechelen, K. Sint-Truidense V.V. and Royal Antwerp.

His son Andreas Pereira plays for SE Palmeiras, after stints at Fulham, Flamengo, Manchester United, Lazio and Valencia.
