= Luis Pacheco (footballer, born 2008) =

Brazilian footballer (born 2008)

Personal information
- Full name: Luis Felipe Pacheco da Costa
- Date of birth: 2 February 2008 (age 18)
- Place of birth: Lajeado, Brazil
- Height: 1.81 m (5 ft 11 in)
- Position: Midfielder

Team information
- Current team: Palmeiras
- Number: 50

Youth career
- 2020–: Palmeiras

Senior career*
| Years | Team | Apps | (Gls) |
| 2025– | Palmeiras | 1 | (0) |

International career^{‡}
| 2025– | Brazil U17 | 6 | (0) |
- * Club domestic league appearances and goals as of 17:44, 21 October 2025 (UTC) ‡ National team caps and goals as of 17:44, 21 October 2025 (UTC)

Luis Felipe Pacheco da Costa (born 2 February 2008) is a Brazilian professional footballer who plays as a midfielder for Palmeiras.

== Club career ==
Born in Lajeado, Rio Grande do Sul, Pacheco joined Palmeiras' youth sides in 2020, aged 12. On 10 October 2025, after being a regular starter for the under-17s, he renewed his contract until 2028.

Pacheco made his first team – and Série A – debut on 11 October 2025, coming on as a late substitute for Andreas Pereira in a 4–1 home routing of his former club Juventude.

== International career ==
Pacheco represented Brazil at under-17 level, making his debut for the side in March 2025. He was also a member of the squad in the 2025 South American U-17 Championship and the 2025 FIFA U-17 World Cup,

== Career statistics ==
As of 21 October 2025

Appearances and goals by club, season and competition
| Club | Season | League | | | Paulista | | Copa do Brasil | | Continental | | Other | | Total | |
| Club | Season | Division | Apps | Goals | Apps | Goals | Apps | Goals | Apps | Goals | Apps | Goals | Apps | Goals |
|---|---|---|---|---|---|---|---|---|---|---|---|---|---|---|
| Palmeiras | 2025 | Série A | 1 | 0 | 0 | 0 | 0 | 0 | 0 | 0 | — | | 1 | 0 |
| Career total | | | 1 | 0 | 0 | 0 | 0 | 0 | 0 | 0 | 0 | 0 | 1 | 0 |

== Honours ==
Palmeiras U20

- Campeonato Brasileiro Sub-20: 2024, 2025

Brazil U17

- South American U-17 Championship: 2025
