= Gustavo Gómez =

Paraguayan footballer (born 1993)

- Gómez with Paraguay in 2026

Personal information
- Full name: Gustavo Raúl Gómez Portillo
- Date of birth: 6 May 1993 (age 33)
- Place of birth: San Juan Bautista, Paraguay
- Height: 1.85 m (6 ft 1 in)
- Position: Centre-back

Team information
- Current team: Palmeiras
- Number: 15

Youth career
- Libertad

Senior career*
Years	Team	Apps	(Gls)
2011–2014	Libertad	47	(5)
2014–2016	Lanús	58	(0)
2016–2019	AC Milan	18	(0)
2018–2019	→ Palmeiras (loan)	20	(4)
2019–	Palmeiras	278	(24)

International career^{‡}
2010	Paraguay U17	13	(1)
2012–2013	Paraguay U20	25	(3)
2013–	Paraguay	97	(5)
- * Club domestic league appearances and goals as of 23:25, 5 November 2026 (UTC) ‡ National team caps and goals as of 23:15, 17 November 2026 (UTC)

Gustavo Raúl Gómez Portillo (born 6 May 1993) is a Paraguayan professional footballer who plays as a centre-back for and captains both Campeonato Brasileiro Série A club Palmeiras and the Paraguay national team.

== Club career ==
=== Lanús ===
Gómez is considered one of the most promising defenders of Paraguay, who began his playing career at Libertad. In the summer of 2014, Gómez left Libertad to play for Argentine Primera División side Lanús. Gustavo Gomez's Lanus conceded a mere 10 goals in 17 games en route to securing 2016 Argentine Primera Division title.

=== AC Milan ===
On 5 August 2016, Gómez completed a move to AC Milan for a fee reported to be in the region of €8.5 million, signing a 5-year contract. He is the first ever Paraguayan footballer to play for Milan. After joining the club he chose number 15, in tribute of his former Lanús teammate, Diego Barisone who died in a car accident. On 27 August 2016, he made his full debut for Milan in Serie A against Napoli, where Napoli beat Milan 4–2.

=== Palmeiras ===
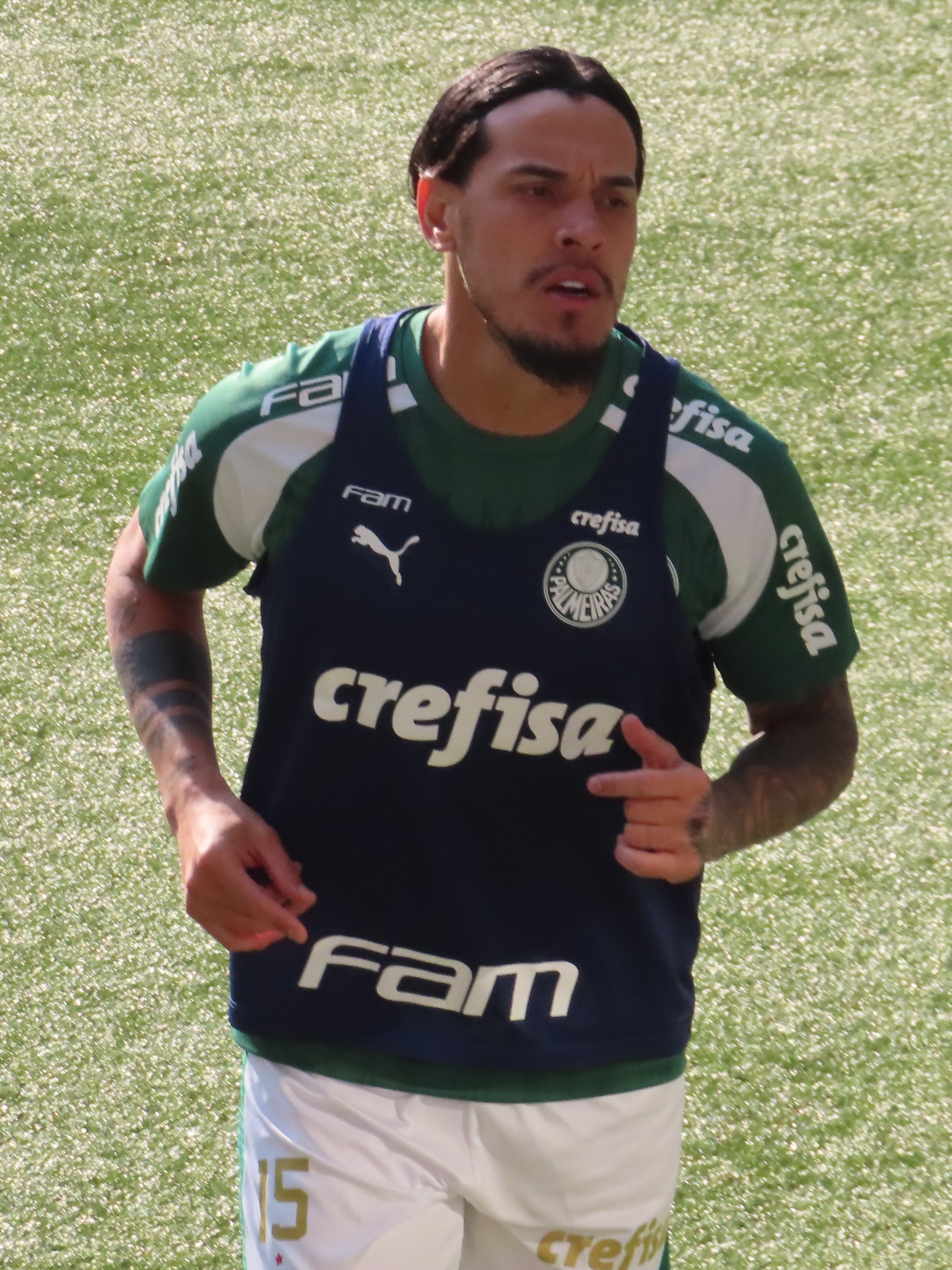
Gómez with Palmeiras in 2024

On 2 August 2018, Gómez transferred to Palmeiras on loan with the option of purchase. Being considered by supporters as one of the best centerbacks of Palmeiras' history, he helped the team achieve three Brasileirão titles in 2018, 2022, and 2023, two Copa Libertadores trophies in 2020 and 2021, five Campeonato Paulista victories in 2020, 2022, 2023, 2024 and 2026 one Recopa Sudamericana in 2022, one Copa do Brasil in 2020 and one Supercopa do Brasil in 2023.

In June 2024, Gómez reached the mark of 37 goals scored with the alviverde shirt, with this, he became the defender with the most goals in the history of Palmeiras, surpassing Luís Pereira.

== International career ==
Gustavo's first selection to the Paraguay national team was for a friendly against Germany in August 2013. On 7 September 2013, he debuted against Bolivia at the age of 20, and in that game he scored his first international goal. He played in the four editions of Copa América (Centenario, 2019, 2021, and 2024), having been the captain of the Paraguayan national team in the first two editions.

On 1 June 2026, he was named by head coach Gustavo Alfaro in Paraguay's 26-man squad for the 2026 FIFA World Cup.

== Style of play ==
Gómez is a defender known for his combative style of play and leadership on the pitch. He is a defender who excels in defense, aerial play, and tackling, but is also capable of contributing to playmaking. He prioritizes defensive quality and physical strength, qualities that have made him one of the best defenders in South American football and an idol at Palmeiras, where he is captain.

== Career statistics ==
=== Club ===
As of match played 8 November 2026

Appearances and goals by club, season and competition
Club	Season	League			State league (Note: Includes Campeonato Paulista)		National cup (Note: Includes Copa Argentina, Coppa Italia, Copa do Brasil)		Continental		Other		Total	
Club	Season	Division	Apps	Goals	Apps	Goals	Apps	Goals	Apps	Goals	Apps	Goals	Apps	Goals
Libertad	2011	Paraguayan Primera División	2	0	—		—		0	0	—		2	0
Libertad	2012	Paraguayan Primera División	2	0	—		—		0	0	—		2	0
Libertad	2013	Paraguayan Primera División	23	1	—		—		10 (Note: Appearance(s) in Copa Sudamericana)	2	—		33	3
Libertad	2014	Paraguayan Primera División	20	4	—		—		0	0	—		20	4
Libertad	Total		47	5	—		—		10	2	—		57	7
Lanús	2014	Argentine Primera División	15	0	—		1	0	1	0	2 (Note: Appearances in Recopa Sudamericana)	0	18	0
Lanús	2015	Argentine Primera División	27	0	—		5	3	4	1	—		36	4
Lanús	2016	Argentine Primera División	16	0	—		1	0	0	0	—		17	0
Lanús	Total		58	0	—		7	3	5	1	2	0	72	4
Milan	2016–17	Serie A	18	0	—		1	0	—		—		19	0
Milan	2017–18	Serie A	0	0	—		0	0	1 (Note: Appearance in UEFA Europa League)	0	—		1	0
Milan	Total		18	0	—		1	0	1	0	—		20	0
Palmeiras (loan)	2018	Série A	14	2	—		0	0	3 (Note: Appearances in Copa Libertadores)	1	—		17	3
Palmeiras (loan)	2019	Série A	22	3	8	1	2	0	10	1	—		42	5
Palmeiras	2020	Série A	21	1	13	1	7	2	13	2	2 (Note: Appearances in FIFA Club World Cup)	0	56	6
Palmeiras	2021	Série A	20	1	5	1	0	0	12	1	5 (Note: One appearance in Supercopa do Brasil, two appearances in Recopa Sudamericana, two appearances in FIFA Club World Cup)	0	42	3
Palmeiras	2022	Série A	30	9	11	0	4	0	12	2	1	0	58	11
Palmeiras	2023	Série A	32	2	14	0	5	1	11	3	1 (Note: Appearance in Supercopa do Brasil)	0	63	6
Palmeiras	2024	Série A	27	1	7	0	3	0	8	2	1	0	46	3
Palmeiras	2025	Série A	27	2	7	1	4	1	11	2	4	0	53	5
Palmeiras	2026	Série A	30	4	10	0	4	0	11	1	—		55	5
Palmeiras	Total		223	24	75	4	29	5	91	15	14	0	432	48
Career total			346	29	75	4	37	7	107	18	16	0	581	58

=== International ===
As of match played 2 October 2026

Appearances and goals by national team and year
National team	Year	Apps	Goals
Paraguay	2013	3	1
Paraguay	2014	7	1
Paraguay	2015	1	0
Paraguay	2016	10	0
Paraguay	2017	6	0
Paraguay	2018	2	0
Paraguay	2019	12	1
Paraguay	2020	4	0
Paraguay	2021	12	1
Paraguay	2022	7	0
Paraguay	2023	8	0
Paraguay	2024	6	0
Paraguay	2025	8	0
Paraguay	2026	11	1
Total		97	5

Scores and results list Paraguay's goal tally first, score column indicates score after each Gómez goal.

List of international goals scored by Gustavo Gómez
No.	Date	Venue	Opponent	Score	Result	Competition
1	6 September 2013	Estadio Defensores del Chaco, Asunción, Paraguay	Bolivia	4–0	4–0	2014 FIFA World Cup qualification
2	5 March 2014	Estadio Nacional, San José, Costa Rica	Costa Rica	1–2	1–2	Friendly
3	9 June 2019	Estadio Defensores del Chaco, Asunción, Paraguay	Guatemala	1–0	2–0	Friendly
4	2 July 2021	Estádio Olímpico Pedro Ludovico, Goiânia, Brazil	Peru	1–0	3–3 (3–4 p)	2021 Copa América
5	17 November 2026	National Stadium, Kallang, Singapore	Japan	2–0	2–1	Friendly

== Honours ==
Libertad

- Paraguayan Primera División: 2012C, 2014A

Lanús

- Argentine Primera División: 2016

Milan

- Supercoppa Italiana: 2016

Palmeiras

- Campeonato Brasileiro Série A: 2018, 2022, 2023
- Copa do Brasil: 2020
- Supercopa do Brasil: 2023
- Copa Libertadores: 2020, 2021; runner-up: 2025
- Recopa Sudamericana: 2022; runner-up: 2021
- Campeonato Paulista: 2020, 2022, 2023, 2024, 2026
- FIFA Club World Cup runner-up: 2021

Individual

- U-20 South American Championship Team of the Tournament: 2013
- Paraguayan Primera División Team of the Season: 2013
- Copa Argentina Team of the Season: 2014–15
- Argentine Primera División Team of the Season: 2016
- Bola de Prata: 2019, 2020, 2022, 2024
- Copa Libertadores Team of the Tournament: 2020, 2021, 2022, 2025
- Troféu Mesa Redonda Team of the Year: 2020, 2025
- Campeonato Brasileiro Série A Team of the Year: 2020, 2021, 2022
- South America Team of the Year: 2020, 2021, 2022, 2023, 2025
- Paraguayan Footballer of the Year: 2021
- IFFHS Men's CONMEBOL Team: 2025
- Campeonato Paulista Team of the Year: 2022, 2023, 2026

== Notes ==
In isolation, Gómez is pronounced [ˈɡomes].
