= Maurício (footballer, born 2001) =

Paraguayan footballer (born 2001)

- Maurício with Paraguay in 2026

Personal information
- Full name: Maurício Magalhães Prado
- Date of birth: 22 June 2001 (age 25)
- Place of birth: São Paulo, Brazil
- Height: 1.75 m (5 ft 9 in)
- Position: Attacking midfielder

Team information
- Current team: Palmeiras
- Number: 18

Youth career
- –2019: Desportivo Brasil
- 2018–2019: → Cruzeiro (loan)

Senior career*
Years	Team	Apps	(Gls)
2019	Desportivo Brasil	0	(0)
2019	→ Cruzeiro (loan)	9	(1)
2019–2020	Cruzeiro	32	(5)
2020–2024	Internacional	176	(25)
2024–	Palmeiras	100	(20)

International career^{‡}
2020	Brazil U20	3	(1)
2023–2024	Brazil U23	7	(1)
2026–	Paraguay	10	(2)
- * Club domestic league appearances and goals as of 23:04, 19 September 2026 (UTC) ‡ National team caps and goals as of 22:15, 13 November 2026 (UTC)

Maurício Magalhães Prado (born 22 June 2001), simply known as Maurício, is a professional footballer who plays as an attacking midfielder or right midfielder for Série A club Palmeiras. Born in Brazil, he plays for the Paraguay national team.

== Career ==
=== Cruzeiro ===
Maurício joined Cruzeiro on loan from Desportivo Brasil ahead of the 2019 season. In November 2019, Cruzeiro confirmed that they had signed Maurício for a fee around 800 thousand R$.

=== Internacional ===
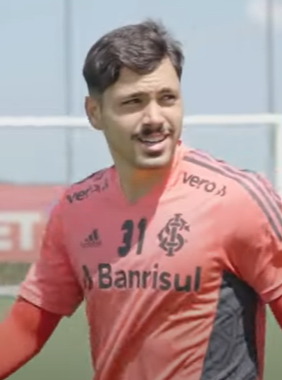
Maurício with Internacional in 2023

On 5 November 2020, Maurício was presented at Internacional in an exchange of players between Inter and Cruzeiro. He scored his first goal against Fluminense FC.

On October 22, 2023, Maurício completed 150 games with the Inter shirt, in the historic victory over Santos, 7–1, in the Brazilian Championship.

=== Palmeiras ===
Maurício debuted on July 17, 2024, he played about 28 minutes in Rio de Janeiro. He dribbled, disarmed and showed his quality. In defeat, Palmeiras lost 1–0 to Botafogo, at the Nilton Santos Stadium, in a game valid for the 17th round of the Brasileirão.

== International career ==
Maurício was born in Brazil and is of Paraguayan descent through his paternal grandmother. In August 2023, he was called up to the Brazil U23s for a set of friendlies.

On 9 February 2026, Maurício's request to switch international allegiance to Paraguay was approved by FIFA. He made his debut for the Paraguay national team in a friendly match against Greece on 28 March.

On 1 June 2026, Maurício was named in the Paraguayan squad for the 2026 FIFA World Cup. He appeared as a substitute in the team's opening match against the United States and scored his first senior international goal in the 73rd minute.

== Career statistics ==
=== Club ===
As of match played 19 September 2026

Appearances and goals by club, season and competition
Club	Season	League			State league		Copa do Brasil		Continental		Other		Total	
Club	Season	Division	Apps	Goals	Apps	Goals	Apps	Goals	Apps	Goals	Apps	Goals	Apps	Goals
Desportivo Brasil	2019	—			0	0	—		—		—		0	0
Cruzeiro (loan)	2019	Série A	8	1	0	0	1	0	0	0	—		9	1
Cruzeiro	2020	Série B	17	1	11 (Note: Appearance(s) in Campeonato Mineiro)	4	1	0	—		—		30	5
Internacional	2020	Série A	8	1	—		0	0	1 (Note: Appearance(s) in Copa Libertadores)	0	—		9	1
Internacional	2021	Série A	30	1	8 (Note: Appearance(s) in Campeonato Gaúcho)	1	0	0	7	0	—		45	2
Internacional	2022	Série A	32	6	13	2	0	0	9 (Note: Appearance(s) in Copa Sudamericana)	1	—		54	9
Internacional	2023	Série A	26	6	13	4	2	0	7	1	—		48	11
Internacional	2024	Série A	5	0	5	2	0	0	5	0	—		17	2
Internacional	Total		101	14	39	9	2	0	29	2	—		173	25
Palmeiras	2024	Série A	20	3	—		0	0	2	1	—		22	4
Palmeiras	2025	Série A	29	3	8 (Note: Appearance(s) in Campeonato Paulista)	5	4	0	7	1	5 (Note: Appearance(s) in FIFA Club World Cup)	1	53	10
Palmeiras	2026	Série A	29	10	9	2	7	3	8	0	0	0	53	15
Palmeiras	Total		78	16	17	7	11	3	18	2	5	1	128	29
Career total			205	32	67	20	14	3	46	4	5	1	340	60

=== International ===
As of match played 13 November 2026

Appearances and goals by national team and year
National team	Year	Apps	Goals
Paraguay	2026	10	2
Total		10	2

Scores and results list Paraguay's goal tally first, score column indicates score after each Maurício goal.

List of international goals scored by Maurício
No.	Date	Venue	Cap	Opponent	Score	Result	Competition
1	12 June 2026	SoFi Stadium, Inglewood, United States	4	United States	1–3	1–4	2026 FIFA World Cup
2	13 November 2026	National Stadium, Kallang, Singapore	10	Singapore	2–1	4–1	Friendly

== Honours ==
Palmeiras

- Campeonato Paulista: 2026
