= Andreas Pereira =

Brazil international footballer (born 1996)

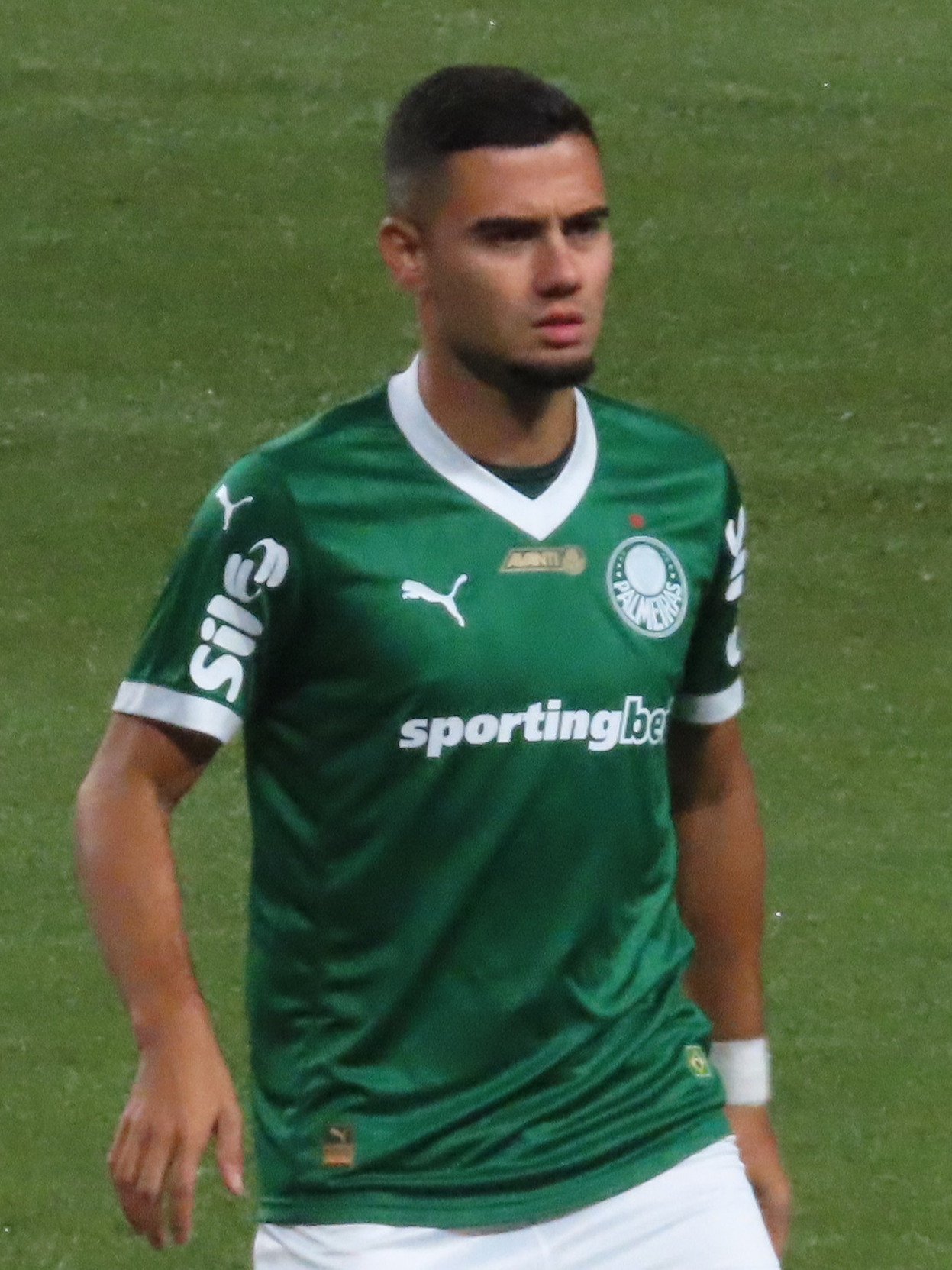
- Pereira with Palmeiras in 2025

Personal information
- Full name: Andreas Hugo Hoelgebaum Pereira
- Date of birth: 1 January 1996 (age 30)
- Place of birth: Duffel, Belgium
- Height: 1.78 m (5 ft 10 in)
- Position: Midfielder

Team information
- Current team: Palmeiras
- Number: 8

Youth career
- 2002–2005: Lommel
- 2005–2011: PSV
- 2011–2014: Manchester United

Senior career*
Years	Team	Apps	(Gls)
2014–2022	Manchester United	45	(2)
2016–2017	→ Granada (loan)	35	(5)
2017–2018	→ Valencia (loan)	23	(1)
2020–2021	→ Lazio (loan)	26	(1)
2021–2022	→ Flamengo (loan)	39	(7)
2022–2025	Fulham	103	(9)
2025–	Palmeiras	57	(4)

International career^{‡}
2010–2011	Belgium U15	7	(1)
2011–2012	Belgium U16	9	(10)
2012–2013	Belgium U17	11	(2)
2014–2015	Brazil U20	7	(2)
2016	Brazil U23	1	(1)
2018–	Brazil	10	(2)
- * Club domestic league appearances and goals as of 23:59, 5 November 2026 (UTC) ‡ National team caps and goals as of 03:28, 6 June 2025 (UTC)

Andreas Hugo Hoelgebaum Pereira (Brazilian Portuguese: [ɐ̃ˈdɾɛɐs peˈɾejɾɐ]; born 1 January 1996) is a professional footballer who plays as a midfielder for Campeonato Brasileiro Série A club Palmeiras. Born in Belgium, he plays for the Brazil national team.

Born in Duffel in the Flanders, Belgium, Andreas Pereira began his youth career with nearby club Lommel. At the age of nine, he joined Dutch club PSV, before signing for Manchester United in November 2011. Pereira made his first Premier League appearance in March 2015. While at Manchester United, he spent time on loan at Spanish clubs Granada and Valencia, Italian club Lazio and Brazilian club Flamengo.

Pereira played youth international football for both the country of his birth, Belgium, and his father's homeland, Brazil, before making his senior international debut for Brazil in September 2018. He was selected in Brazil's squad for the 2024 Copa América.

== Club career ==
=== Manchester United ===
==== Early years ====
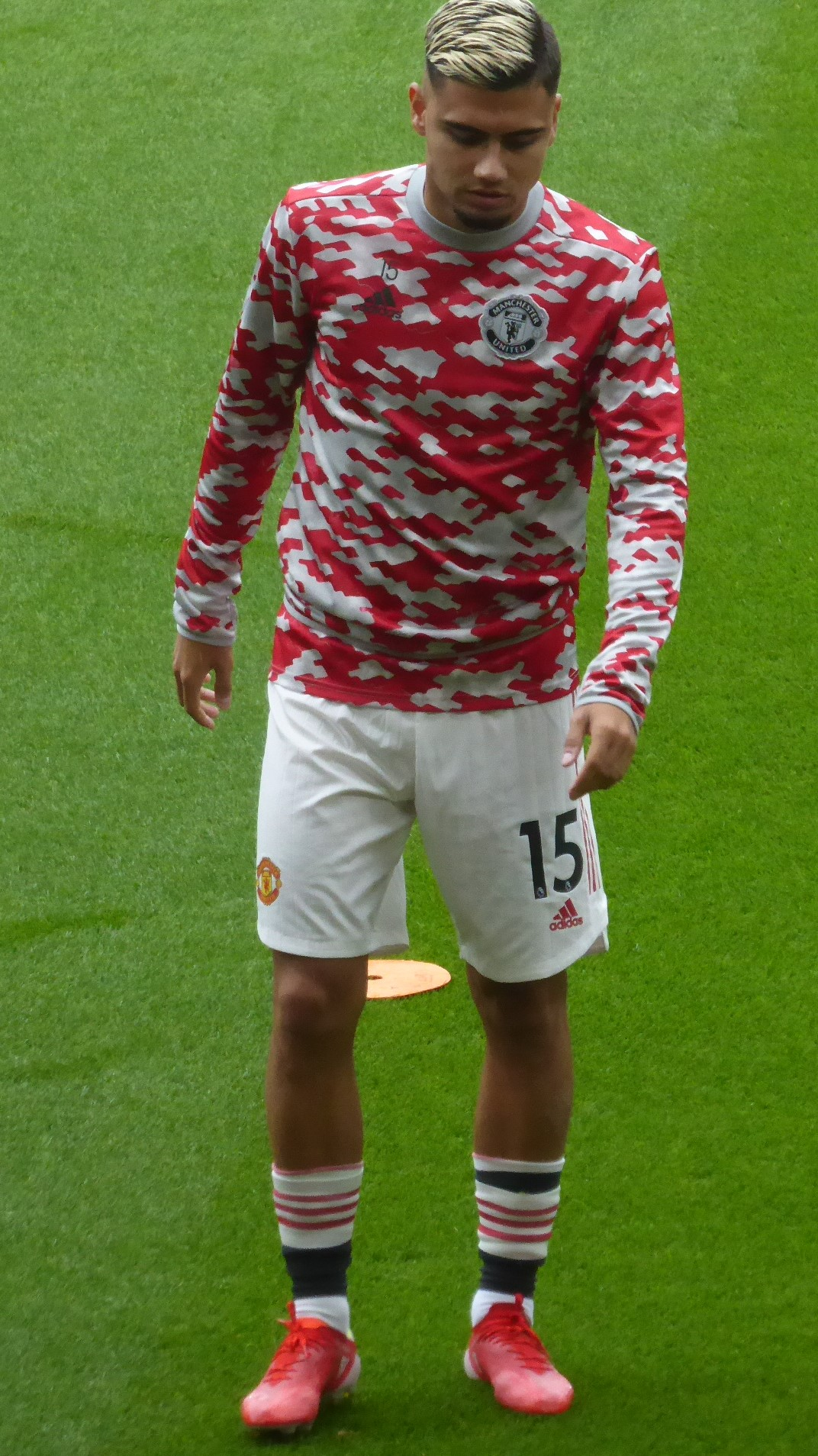
Pereira warming up before a game with Manchester United in 2021

The son of former Brazilian professional footballer Marcos Pereira, Andreas Pereira was born in Duffel while his father was a player there. He joined Dutch club PSV in 2005, when he was nine years old. In 2011, after impressing at the Manchester United Premier Cup, he became a target for several big English clubs, including Arsenal, Chelsea and Liverpool, but a visit from Manchester United manager Alex Ferguson in November 2011 convinced Pereira to sign for the Old Trafford club.

Due to regulations regarding international transfers, the move could not be completed until Pereira's 16th birthday on 1 January 2012, and further complications with international clearance meant that his Manchester United debut was delayed until April 2012. He made his debut for the under-18s in a league match away to Sheffield Wednesday on 25 April 2012, but heavy rain meant the match had to be abandoned as a goalless draw after 35 minutes. He made two more appearances that season as the under-18s finished eighth out of 10 teams in their Premier Academy League group.

After signing as an academy scholar in July 2012, Pereira became a regular in the under-18s in the 2012–13 season, making 20 appearances and scoring five goals. He also got his first taste of reserve team football during the season, coming on as a substitute for James Weir in a 3–1 win over Oldham Athletic in the Manchester Senior Cup, followed by another substitute appearance against Liverpool in the semi-finals of the Professional Development League. In recognition of his performances, on 7 January 2013, shortly after his 17th birthday, Pereira received his first professional contract.

Ahead of the 2013–14 season, Pereira was named as Manchester United's captain for their 2013 Milk Cup campaign, and was named Player of the Tournament for his three goals as Manchester United won the Premier Section. He went on to feature heavily for both the under-18s and the under-21s, and was ever present in the inaugural UEFA Youth League; he also scored twice in three appearances in the FA Youth Cup, including a curling, 25-yard effort against Burnley in the third round. For the under-21s, he appeared in 17 out of 21 league matches as Manchester United finished third; he then scored the only goal in the semi-final against Liverpool, only for the team to lose to Chelsea in the final.

==== 2014–15 season ====
Pereira began the 2014–15 season with silverware as Manchester United beat Manchester City 4–1 in the final of the Manchester Senior Cup on 7 August 2014. He made his senior debut three weeks later, coming on as a half-time substitute for Saidy Janko in a 4–0 away defeat to Milton Keynes Dons in the second round of the League Cup. On 15 March 2015, Pereira made his Premier League debut against Tottenham Hotspur, coming on as a 77th-minute substitute for Juan Mata in a 3–0 win for United.

On 1 May, he signed a new contract with Manchester United until at least June 2018. Eighteen days later, Pereira was voted Manchester United's under-21 player of the year for 2014–15.

==== 2015–16 season ====
On 21 July, Pereira scored his first goal for Manchester United's senior squad in the 3–1 win against the San Jose Earthquakes in the 2015 International Champions Cup, after coming on as a second-half substitute. He made his first competitive start for the senior team on 23 September 2015, in the third round of the League Cup, and scored a free kick in the eventual 3–0 win over Ipswich Town.

==== 2016–17 season: Loan to Granada ====
On 26 August 2016, Pereira joined Spanish club Granada on a season-long loan deal. He made his debut in La Liga two days later, replacing Luís Martins in the 55th minute of a 5–1 loss at Las Palmas.

Pereira scored his first goal for the Nazaríes on 3 December, opening a 2–1 home win over fellow Andalusians Sevilla. On 6 February 2017, he netted the only goal of a win over Las Palmas at the Estadio Nuevo Los Cármenes, with a long-range strike. Eleven days later, he was again on the scoresheet for a 4–1 victory against Real Betis at the same ground, but was sent off for a push; he was banned for two games and the club fined €180.

==== 2017–18 season: Loan to Valencia ====
On 1 September 2017, Valencia announced the arrival of Pereira to the club on a season-long loan deal. He made his debut in a 0–0 home draw against Atlético Madrid eight days later, and scored his only goal for Los Che on 15 October, with a long-range strike as a substitute to conclude a 6–3 win at Real Betis.

==== 2018–19 season ====
On 2 March 2019, Pereira scored his first Premier League goal in a 3–2 victory against Southampton. The goal later earned him Manchester United's goal of the season for 2018–19 season. He also recorded an assist for Romelu Lukaku in the same match. On 7 March, Pereira was featured in the starting line-up during the historic Champions League Round of 16 (2nd Leg) win vs PSG, where the team was able to come back from a 2-goal deficit they conceded at home and win on away goals at the Parc des Princes, a record that has never been broken before.

==== 2019–20 season ====
On 5 July 2019, it was announced that Pereira had signed a new four-year contract with the option to extend by a further year. On 11 August, he started in Manchester United's opening day 4–0 win against Chelsea, in which he assisted Anthony Martial for the second goal. He scored his first goal of the season two months later, on 10 November, in a 3–1 home win against Brighton.

==== 2020–21 season: Loan to Lazio ====
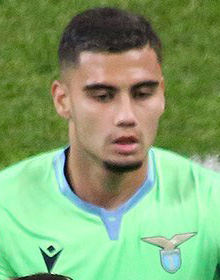
Pereira playing for Lazio in 2020

On 2 October 2020, Lazio announced the arrival of Pereira to the club on a season-long loan. On 1 November 2020, he scored his first Serie A goal in a 4–3 away win against Torino.

==== 2021–22 season: Loan to Flamengo ====
On 20 August 2021, Pereira joined Flamengo on a one-year loan. The Brazilian club agreed to pay €1m for the loan. In the 2021 Copa Libertadores final, he made a decisive mistake that caused Flamengo to lose 2–1 against Palmeiras after extra time. Nevertheless, Pereira was awarded medals for Flamengo's victories in both the 2022 Copa Libertadores and the Copa do Brasil, despite departing the club early in the summer of that year.

=== Fulham ===
On 11 July 2022, Fulham announced the signing of Pereira on a four-year contract, for an undisclosed fee, understood to be worth £10m with add-ons.

He made his debut for Fulham on 6 August, starting and playing 89 minutes in a 2–2 home draw against Liverpool. Later that year, on 9 October, he netted his first goal in a 3–1 away defeat against West Ham United. On 30 April 2023, due to a broken ankle, Pereira played his last game of the season. On 2 May 2023, the club said he would have an operation on a broken ankle and was expected back "later in the year". On 29 August 2025, Fulham announced Pereira's departure after he had made 119 appearances for the club.

=== Palmeiras ===
In August 2025, Pereira returned to Brazil to join Palmeiras. On 21 September, he scored his first goals for the club by netting a brace in a 4–1 victory over Fortaleza. Later that year, he featured in the 2025 Copa Libertadores final which ended in a 1–0 defeat against his former club Flamengo.

== International career ==
Born in Belgium to Brazilian parents, Pereira was eligible to represent either Belgium or Brazil at international level. He initially represented Belgium at under-15, under-16 and under-17 levels, but has since stated, "My heart is Brazilian." He received his first Brazil call-up in 2014, joining the under-20 team on their successful Panda Cup campaign in China. At the 2015 FIFA U-20 World Cup in New Zealand, Pereira equalised in the final against Serbia, but Brazil lost 2–1 after extra time. In total, he scored twice in seven appearances at under-20 level. Pereira made one appearance and scored one goal for Brazil at under-23 level, in a friendly against South Africa in March 2016.

On 17 August 2018, Pereira received his first senior call up for the friendly matches against the United States and El Salvador. He made his debut against El Salvador on 11 September, as the first player in over 100 years to play for Brazil having been born outside of the country.

In March 2024, Pereira was called up to the Brazil squad again for two friendly matches against England and Spain, where he featured as a substitute in both.

== Career statistics ==
=== Club ===
As of match played 8 November 2026

Appearances and goals by club, season and competition
Club	Season	League			State league (Note: Includes Campeonato Carioca, Campeonato Paulista)		National cup (Note: Includes FA Cup, Copa del Rey, Coppa Italia, Copa do Brasil)		League cup (Note: Includes Football League/EFL Cup)		Continental		Total	
Club	Season	Division	Apps	Goals	Apps	Goals	Apps	Goals	Apps	Goals	Apps	Goals	Apps	Goals
Manchester United	2014–15	Premier League	1	0	—		0	0	1	0	—		2	0
Manchester United	2015–16	Premier League	4	0	—		2	0	2	1	3 (Note: One appearance in UEFA Champions League, two appearances in UEFA Europa League)	0	11	1
Manchester United	2018–19	Premier League	15	1	—		3	0	0	0	4 (Note: Appearances in UEFA Champions League)	0	22	1
Manchester United	2019–20	Premier League	25	1	—		4	0	5	0	6 (Note: Appearances in UEFA Europa League)	1	40	2
Manchester United	Total		45	2	—		9	0	8	1	13	1	75	4
Granada (loan)	2016–17	La Liga	35	5	—		2	0	—		—		37	5
Valencia (loan)	2017–18	La Liga	23	1	—		6	0	—		—		29	1
Lazio (loan)	2020–21	Serie A	26	1	—		2	0	—		5	0	33	1
Flamengo (loan)	2021	Série A	18	5	—		3	0	—		3 (Note: Appearances in Copa Libertadores)	0	24	5
Flamengo (loan)	2022	Série A	13	2	8	0	1	0	—		7	1	29	3
Flamengo (loan)	Total		31	7	8	0	4	0	—		10	1	53	8
Fulham	2022–23	Premier League	33	4	—		5	1	0	0	—		38	5
Fulham	2023–24	Premier League	37	3	—		2	0	5	0	—		44	3
Fulham	2024–25	Premier League	33	2	—		4	0	0	0	—		37	2
Fulham	Total		103	9	—		11	1	5	0	—		119	10
Palmeiras	2025	Série A	15	2	—		—		—		5	0	20	2
Palmeiras	2026	Série A	32	1	10	1	7	1	—		10	1	59	4
Palmeiras	Total		47	3	10	1	7	1	—		15	1	79	6
Career total			310	28	18	1	41	2	13	1	43	3	425	35

=== International ===
As of match played 5 June 2025

Appearances and goals by national team and year
National team	Year	Apps	Goals
Brazil	2018	1	0
Brazil	2024	8	2
Brazil	2025	1	0
Total		10	2

Scores and results list Brazil's goal tally first.

List of international goals scored by Andreas Pereira
No.	Date	Venue	Cap	Opponent	Score	Result	Competition
1	8 June 2024	Kyle Field, College Station, United States	4	Mexico	1–0	3–2	Friendly
2	15 October 2024	Arena BRB Mané Garrincha, Brasília, Brazil	9	Peru	3–0	4–0	2026 FIFA World Cup qualification

== Honours ==
Manchester United Under-21

- U21 Premier League: 2012–13, 2014–15, 2015–16

Flamengo

- Copa do Brasil: 2022
- Copa Libertadores: 2022

Palmeiras

- Campeonato Paulista: 2026
- Copa Libertadores runner-up: 2025

Brazil U20

- FIFA U-20 World Cup runner-up: 2015

Individual

- Denzil Haroun Reserve Team Player of the Year: 2014–15
- Manchester United Goal of the Season: 2018–19 (vs. Southampton, 2 March 2019)
- Troféu Mesa Redonda Team of the Year: 2025
- Campeonato Paulista Team of the Year: 2026
