= 2026 Campeonato Paulista =

Campeonato Paulista - Série A1
- Season: 2026
- Dates: 10 January – 8 March 2026
- Champions: Palmeiras
- Relegated: Velo Clube; Ponte Preta
- Matches: 72
- Goals: 168 (2.33 per match)
- Top goalscorer: Robson (7 goals)

The 2026 Campeonato Paulista de Futebol Profissional da Primeira Divisão - Série A1 (officially the Paulistão Casas Bahia 2026 due to sponsorship reasons) was the 125th season of São Paulo's top professional football league. The competition was played from 10 January to 8 March 2026.

Corinthians are the defending champions.

== Teams ==
Location of teams in 2026 Campeonato Paulista

Pos.	Relegated to 2026 Série A2
15th	Água Santa
16th	Inter de Limeira

Pos.	Promoted from 2025 Série A2
1st	Capivariano
2nd	Primavera

=== Stadium and locations ===
Team	City	Stadium	Capacity
Botafogo	Ribeirão Preto	Santa Cruz	29,292
Capivariano	Capivari	Arena Capivari	7,314
Corinthians	São Paulo	Neo Química Arena	48,905
Guarani	Campinas	Brinco de Ouro	29,130
Mirassol	Mirassol	Campos Maia	14,534
Noroeste	Bauru	Alfredo de Castilho	18,866
Novorizontino	Novo Horizonte	Doutor Jorge Ismael de Biasi	16,000
Palmeiras	São Paulo	Allianz Parque	43,713
Ponte Preta	Campinas	Moisés Lucarelli	19,728
Portuguesa	São Paulo	Canindé	21,004
Primavera	Indaiatuba	Ítalo Mário Limongi	7,820
Red Bull Bragantino	Bragança Paulista	Cícero de Souza Marques	12,000
Santos	Santos	Vila Belmiro	16,068
São Bernardo	São Bernardo do Campo	1º de Maio	15,159
São Paulo	São Paulo	MorumBIS	66,795
Velo Clube	Rio Claro	Benito Agnelo Castellano	8,136

=== Personnel and kits ===
Team	Head coach	Captain	Kit manufacturer	Main sponsor	Other sponsors
Botafogo	(Brazil) Cláudio Tencati	(Argentina) Leandro Maciel	Volt Sport	Nicnet	List: Front: Falaguasta Pizza; Back: None; Sleeves: Sermed Saúde; Shorts: None; Socks: None; Number: None
Capivariano	(Brazil) Elio Sizenando	(Brazil) Bruno Silva	Junpe Uniformes	Microsal	List: Front: SharkPro, Rivalo.bet.br, Brasilit; Back: Grupo Stefanini, Rosaves, Sicoob; Sleeves: Microsal; Shorts: Tek Bond, Klarina; Socks: None; Number: None
Corinthians	(Brazil) Dorival Júnior	(Argentina) Rodrigo Garro	Nike	Esportes da Sorte	List: Front: Appgas; Back: EZZE Seguros, AREA Material Elétrico; Sleeves: Banco BMG; Shorts: UniCesumar; Socks: KSK Consórcio; Number: None
Guarani	(Brazil) Matheus Costa	(Brazil) Rafael Donato	Kappa	ASA Alumínio	List: Front: Única Saúde; Back: None; Sleeves: Shark Pro; Shorts: Única Saúde; Socks: None; Number: None
Mirassol	(Brazil) Rafael Guanaes	(Brazil) Reinaldo	Athleta	Guaraná Poty	List: Front: Ruiz Coffees, Ecori, Cozimax; Back: Rede Sol Supermercados, Pacaembu Construtora, Industrias Santa Maria, DS Tecnologia Automotiva, Ecori; Sleeves: Kodilar Alimentos; Shorts: Rede Sol Supermercados, Lumavi; Socks: Lumavi; Number: Mtech
Noroeste	(Brazil) Guilherme Alves	(Brazil) Carlinhos	Physicus	Unimed	List: Front: Vero, tributt'ox, Rede LK, Mandaliti, Ecovita; Back: Tudor Baterias, Pegoraro Engenharia, Maestria – Tintas e Sistemas; Sleeves: Nutrisaude; Shorts: Mobifácil; Socks: None; Number: None
Novorizontino	(Brazil) Enderson Moreira	(Brazil) Robson	Physicus	PAGOL.Bet	List: Front: Açúcar Santa Isabel; Back: Cresol, Physicus, DS Tecnologia Automotiva; Sleeves: Kodillar Alimentos; Shorts: Guaraná Poty; Socks: None; Number: Oquei Telecom
Palmeiras	(Portugal) Abel Ferreira	(Paraguay) Gustavo Gómez	Puma	Sportingbet	List: Front: Avanti; Back: Grupo Fictor; Sleeves: Sil; Shorts: UNIASSELVI; Socks: None; Number: Sportingbet
Ponte Preta	(Brazil) Marcelo Fernandes	(Brazil) Élvis	Diadora	Ginga.bet	List: Front: Única Saúde, DESKTOP; Back: Cortag; Sleeves: None; Shorts: Única Saúde, Zé Delivery; Socks: None; Number: None
Portuguesa	(Brazil) Fábio Matias	(Brazil) Gabriel Pires	Joma	ZeroUm	List: Front: Wega; Back: None; Sleeves: None; Shorts: Mobifácil; Socks: None; Number: None
Primavera	(Brazil) Rafael Marques	(Brazil) Júnior Caiçara	Junpe Uniformes	Brasa	List: Front: Lenovo, Metal Coat, Yanmar; Back: Vera Cruz, Cellera Farma; Sleeves: Sew Eurodrive Brasil; Shorts: Metal Coat; Socks: None; Number: None
Red Bull Bragantino	(Brazil) Vagner Mancini	(Brazil) Cleiton	Puma	Red Bull	List: Front: None; Back: Red Bull, Asaas, Betfast; Sleeves: Betfast; Shorts: None; Socks: None; Number: None
Santos	(Argentina) Juan Pablo Vojvoda	(Brazil) Neymar	Umbro	Bet7K	List: Front: Canção Alimentos, Farmácias Nissei, Havan; Back: Viva Sorte, Placo; Sleeves: Kicaldo; Shorts: Next10 Nutrition, UNIASSELVI; Socks: Pague Safe; Number: Loovi Seguros
São Bernardo	(Brazil) Ricardo Catalá	(Brazil) Foguinho	Magnum	Magnum Bank	List: Front: Amao Nutrition, Zona de Jogo; Back: Champion Relógios; Sleeves: None; Shorts: None; Socks: None; Number: None
São Paulo	(Argentina) Hernán Crespo	(Argentina) Jonathan Calleri	New Balance	Superbet	List: Front: Ademicon, Elgin; Back: Superbet, Blue Plano de Saúde; Sleeves: None; Shorts: ABC da Construção; Socks: None; Number: eFootball
Velo Clube	(Brazil) Pintado	(Brazil) Marcelo Augusto	Junpe Uniformes	Embramaco	List: Front: Fuzza, Talklink, Bocão Shopping dos Pisos, Physicus, Lightwall; Back: Bocão Shopping dos Pisos, Embramaco; Sleeves: Esmaltec; Shorts: Infrasa, Guaraná Poty; Socks: None; Number: None

== Format ==
Inspired by the new UEFA Champions League format, teams were divided into four pots, with four teams in each pot. Teams will face all three teams of their own pot, two of another two pots, and one of another one pot, meaning:

- Teams from pot A (teams with the most number of Campeonato Paulista titles) will face two teams from pot B and C, and one from pot D;
- Teams from pot B (teams placed between 5th and 8th place in the previous Paulista) will face two teams from pot A and D, and one from pot C;
- Teams from pot C (teams placed between 9th and 12th place in the previous Paulista) will face two teams from pot A and D, and one from pot B;
- Teams from pot D (teams placed between in 13th and 14th place in the previous Paulista, and the two promoted teams) will face two teams from pot B and C, and one from pot A.

In the first stage, all teams will play eight matches, with the matches of teams between pots being defined by a draw. The top eight teams qualify to the quarterfinals, played in a single match, with the winners qualifying to the semifinals, also played in one match. Teams with the best campaign hold de advantage of playing at home.

The two last-placed teams of the first stage are relegated to the Campeonato Paulista Série A2.

The finals will be played in two legs, with the best placed team playing the second leg at home.

=== Draw ===
Teams were divided into four pots, and the draw for the matches took place on 11 November 2025.

Pot A	Pot B	Pot C	Pot D
Corinthians (A4); Palmeiras (A2); Santos (A1); São Paulo (A3)	Mirassol (B3); Novorizontino (B2); Red Bull Bragantino (B1); São Bernardo (B4)	Guarani (C2); Ponte Preta (C4); Portuguesa (C3); Velo Clube (C1)	Botafogo (D2); Capivariano (D4); Noroeste (D1); Primavera (D3)

== First stage ==
Pos	Team	Pld	W	D	L	GF	GA	GD	Pts	Qualification
1	Novorizontino	8	5	1	2	16	10	+6	16	Qualification for the Quarter-finals
2	Palmeiras	8	5	1	2	8	7	+1	16	Qualification for the Quarter-finals
3	Red Bull Bragantino	8	4	4	0	14	2	+12	16	Qualification for the Quarter-finals
4	Portuguesa	8	5	0	3	11	7	+4	15	Qualification for the Quarter-finals
5	Corinthians	8	4	2	2	10	6	+4	14	Qualification for the Quarter-finals
6	São Paulo	8	4	1	3	11	12	−1	13	Qualification for the Quarter-finals
7	Capivariano	8	4	1	3	7	10	−3	13	Qualification for the Quarter-finals
8	Santos	8	3	3	2	12	7	+5	12	Qualification for the Quarter-finals
9	Guarani	8	3	3	2	6	7	−1	12	
10	Botafogo	8	3	2	3	5	9	−4	11	
11	Mirassol	8	2	2	4	10	8	+2	8	
12	Primavera	8	2	2	4	14	15	−1	8	
13	São Bernardo	8	2	2	4	8	10	−2	8	
14	Noroeste	8	1	5	2	11	11	0	8	
15	Velo Clube (R)	8	1	2	5	2	13	−11	5	Relegation to Série A2
16	Ponte Preta (R)	8	0	1	7	3	14	−11	1	Relegation to Série A2

Source: FPF
Rules for classification: 1) points; 2) wins; 3) goal difference; 4) goals scored; 5) head-to-head results (only between 2 teams); 6) fewest red cards; 7) fewest yellow cards; 8) draw.
(R) Relegated

== Results ==
Home \ Away	BOT	CAP	COR	GUA	MIR	NOR	NOV	PAL	PON	POR	PRI	RBB	SAN	SBE	SPA	VEL
Botafogo		0–1				1–1		1–0			1–0					
Capivariano					1–0				2–0	1–0	1–2					
Corinthians		3–0						0–1	3–0						1–1	
Guarani	0–2								1–0		1–1		1–1			
Mirassol							1–1			1–2		0–0			3–0	
Noroeste		1–1										0–1	1–2			2–0
Novorizontino	2–0			2–0				4–0						2–1		
Palmeiras				1–1	1–0								1–0		3–1	
Ponte Preta						2–2								0–1	1–2	0–1
Portuguesa				0–1				0–1	2–0							2–0
Primavera					3–1	3–3	3–4			1–2						
Red Bull Bragantino	5–0		3–0				3–0							1–1		
Santos			1–1				2–1					0–0				6–0
São Bernardo		4–0	0–1		0–4	1–1										
São Paulo										2–3	2–1		2–0	1–0		
Velo Clube	0–0		0–1	0–1								1–1				

Source: FPF
Legend: Blue = home team win; Yellow = draw; Red = away team win.

== Knockout stage ==
The knockout stage of the 2026 Campeonato Paulista began on 21 February 2026 with the quarter-finals and end on 8 March 2026 with the final. A total of eight teams will compete in the knockout stage.

=== Round dates ===
Round	First leg	Second leg
Quarter-finals	21–22 February 2026	–
Semi-finals	28 February – 1 March 2026	–
Finals	4 March 2026	8 March 2026

=== Format ===
The quarter-finals will be played in a single match at the stadium of the better-ranked team in the first phase. If the match ends in a draw, the tie will be decided via a penalty shoot-out. The semi-finals will be played with the same format as the quarter-finals. The finals will be played over two legs, with the team having the better record in matches from the previous stages hosting the second leg.

=== Qualified teams ===
Pos	Team
1	Novorizontino
2	Palmeiras
3	Red Bull Bragantino
4	Portuguesa
5	Corinthians
6	São Paulo
7	Capivariano
8	Santos

=== Bracket ===
Quarterfinals
1	Novorizontino	2
8	Santos	1
4	Portuguesa	1 (7)
5	Corinthians	1 (8)
2	Palmeiras	4
7	Capivariano	0
3	Red Bull Bragantino	1
6	São Paulo	2

Semifinals
1	Novorizontino	1
5	Corinthians	0
2	Palmeiras	2
6	São Paulo	1

Finals
1	Novorizontino	0	1	1
2	Palmeiras	1	2	3

=== Quarter-finals ===
Team 1	Score	Team 2
Red Bull Bragantino	1−2	São Paulo
Palmeiras	4−0	Capivariano
Novorizontino	2−1	Santos
Portuguesa	1−1 (7–8 p)	Corinthians

21 February 2026
18:00 UTC-03:00

Red Bull Bragantino	1–2	São Paulo
Gustavo Marques 72'	Report	Bobadilla 40'; Lucas Moura 52'

Estádio Cícero de Souza Marques, Bragança Paulista
Attendance: 7,019
Referee: Daiane Muniz

21 February 2026
20:30 UTC-03:00

Palmeiras	4–0	Capivariano
Vitor Roque 6', 36'; Andreas Pereira 90+2' (pen.); Sosa 90+4'	Report

Arena Barueri, Barueri
Attendance: 21,531
Referee: Edina Alves Batista

22 February 2026
16:00 UTC-03:00

Novorizontino	2–1	Santos
Rômulo 45+1'; Léo Naldi 90+6'	Report	Bontempo 65'

Estádio Doutor Jorge Ismael de Biasi, Novo Horizonte
Attendance: 10,417
Referee: Flávio Rodrigues de Souza

22 February 2026
20:30 UTC-03:00

Portuguesa	1–1	Corinthians
Zé Vitor 37'	Report	Vitinho 90+4'
Penalties
Zé Vitor (penalty scored); Renê (penalty missed); Eric Botteghin (penalty scored); Gustavo Henrique (penalty scored); Everton Maceió (penalty scored); Hudson (penalty scored); Gustavo Salomão (penalty scored); Carlos Eduardo (penalty scored); Cauari (penalty missed)	7–8	(penalty missed) Garro; (penalty scored) Vitinho; (penalty scored) Matheuzinho; (penalty scored) Gustavo Henrique; (penalty scored) Pedro Raul; (penalty scored) André Ramalho; (penalty scored) Kayke Ferrari; (penalty scored) André; (penalty scored) Allan

Canindé, São Paulo
Attendance: 12,784
Referee: Raphael Claus

=== Semi-finals ===
Team 1	Score	Team 2
Novorizontino	1–0	Corinthians
Palmeiras	2–1	São Paulo

28 February 2026
20:30 UTC-03:00

Novorizontino	1–0	Corinthians
Mayk 74'	Report

Estádio Doutor Jorge Ismael de Biasi, Novo Horizonte
Attendance: 10,899
Referee: João Vitor Gobi

1 March 2026
20:30 UTC-03:00

Palmeiras	2–1	São Paulo
Maurício 8'; López 58'	Report	Calleri 69' (pen.)

Arena Barueri, Barueri
Attendance: 29,717
Referee: Daiane Muniz

=== Finals ===
Team 1	Agg.	Team 2	1st leg	2nd leg
Novorizontino	1–3	Palmeiras	0–1	1–2

==== First leg ====
4 March 2026
20:00 UTC−3

Palmeiras	1–0	Novorizontino
López 35'	Report

Arena Barueri, Barueri
Attendance: 26,802
Referee: Matheus Delgado Candançan

==== Second leg ====
8 March 2026
20:30 UTC−3

Novorizontino	1–2	Palmeiras
Matheus Bianqui 26'	Report	Murilo 6'; Vitor Roque 62'

Estádio Doutor Jorge Ismael de Biasi, Novo Horizonte
Attendance: 9,902
Referee: Flávio Rodrigues de Souza

== Overall table ==
Pos	Team	Pld	W	D	L	GF	GA	GD	Pts	Qualification or relegation
1	Palmeiras (C)	12	9	1	2	17	9	+8	28	Finalists
2	Novorizontino	12	7	1	4	20	14	+6	22	Finalists
3	São Paulo	10	5	1	4	14	15	−1	16	Eliminated in the Semi-finals
4	Corinthians	10	4	3	3	11	8	+3	15	Eliminated in the Semi-finals
5	Portuguesa	9	5	1	3	12	8	+4	16	Eliminated in the Quarter-finals
6	Red Bull Bragantino	9	4	4	1	15	4	+11	16	Eliminated in the Quarter-finals
7	Capivariano	9	4	1	4	7	14	−7	13	Eliminated in the Quarter-finals
8	Santos	9	3	3	3	13	9	+4	12	Eliminated in the Quarter-finals
9	Guarani	8	3	3	2	6	7	−1	12	
10	Botafogo	8	3	2	3	5	9	−4	11	
11	Mirassol	8	2	2	4	10	8	+2	8	
12	Primavera	8	2	2	4	14	15	−1	8	
13	São Bernardo	8	2	2	4	8	10	−2	8	
14	Noroeste	8	1	5	2	11	11	0	8	
15	Velo Clube (R)	8	1	2	5	2	13	−11	5	Relegation to Série A2
16	Ponte Preta (R)	8	0	1	7	3	14	−11	1	Relegation to Série A2

Rules for classification: 1st points; 2nd wins; 3rd goal difference; 4th goals scored; 5th head-to-head results; 6th least red cards received; 7th least yellow cards received; 8th draw
(C) Champions; (R) Relegated

== Top scorers ==
Rank	Player	Team	Goals
1	(Brazil) Robson	Novorizontino	7
2	(Argentina) José Manuel López	Palmeiras	6
3	(Brazil) Rômulo	Novorizontino	5
3	(Argentina) Jonathan Calleri	São Paulo	5
4	(Brazil) Carlão	Noroeste	4
4	(Brazil) Gabriel Barbosa	Santos	4
4	(Brazil) Gabriel Poveda	Primavera	4
