= 2019 Santa Cruz Futebol Clube season =

Santa Cruz
2019 season
- Chairman: Constantino Junior
- Manager: Leston Júnior; Milton Mendes
- Stadium: Estádio do Arruda; Arena Pernambuco
- Série C: 13th
- Pernambucano: Quarter-final
- Copa do Brasil: Fourth round
- Copa do Nordeste: Semi-final
- Top goalscorer: League: Pipico (7); All: Pipico (16)
Home colours	Away colours	Third colours

The 2019 season was Santa Cruz's 106th season in the club's history. Santa Cruz competed in the Campeonato Pernambucano, Série C, Copa do Brasil and Copa do Nordeste.

== Squad ==
Note: Flags indicate national team as defined under FIFA eligibility rules; some limited exceptions apply. Players may hold more than one non-FIFA nationality.

No.	Pos.	Nation	Player
25	GK	BRA	Ricardo Ernesto
—	GK	BRA	Maycon Cleiton
1	GK	BRA	Anderson
3	DF	BRA	João Victor
14	DF	BRA	Augusto Potiguar
—	DF	BRA	Raphael Soares
—	DF	BRA	Danny Morais
4	DF	BRA	Vitão
16	DF	BRA	Bruno Ré
—	DF	BRA	Cesinha
2	DF	BRA	Marcos Martins
13	DF	BRA	William Alves
—	MF	BRA	Patrick Vieira
—	MF	BRA	Eduardo

No.	Pos.	Nation	Player
5	MF	BRA	Charles Almeida
15	MF	BRA	Lucas Gonçalves
16	MF	BRA	Luiz Felipe
—	MF	BRA	Hericles
10	MF	BRA	Allan Dias
—	MF	BRA	Jeremias
8	MF	BRA	Ítalo
9	FW	BRA	Pipico
11	FW	BRA	Augusto
19	FW	BRA	Elias Carioca
—	FW	BRA	Silas
20	FW	BRA	Neto Costa
7	FW	BRA	Jô
17	FW	BRA	Guilherme Queiróz

== Statistics ==
=== Overall ===
Games played	44 (10 Copa do Nordeste, 10 Pernambucano, 6 Copa do Brasil, 18 Série C)
Games won	17 (3 Copa do Nordeste, 5 Pernambucano, 3 Copa do Brasil, 6 Série C)
Games drawn	15 (4 Copa do Nordeste, 3 Pernambucano, 1 Copa do Brasil, 7 Série C)
Games lost	12 (3 Copa do Nordeste, 2 Pernambucano, 2 Copa do Brasil, 5 Série C)
Goals scored	55
Goals conceded	51
Goal difference	+4
Best results (goal difference)	4–1 (H) v Afogados da Ingazeira – Pernambucano – 2019.01.29
Worst result (goal difference)	0–3 (A) v Vitória das Tabocas – Pernambucano – 2019.02.26; 0–3 (A) v Ferroviário – Série C – 2019.05.05
Top scorer	Pipico (16)

Source: Santa Cruz official website

=== Goalscorers ===
Place	Position	Nationality	Number	Name	Copa do Nordeste	Campeonato Pernambucano	Copa do Brasil	Série C	Total
1	FW	(Brazil)	9	Pipico	4	0	5	7	16
2	FW	(Brazil)	19	Elias Carioca	1	2	1	1	5
3	MF	(Brazil)	10	Allan Dias	0	4	0	0	4
3	MF	(Brazil)	5	Charles Almeida	0	0	1	3	4
3	DF	(Brazil)	4	Vitão	1	2	0	1	4
4	FW	(Brazil)	11	Augusto	0	2	0	1	3
4	FW	(Brazil)	10	Dudu	0	0	0	3	3
5	MF	(Brazil)	10	Everton	0	0	0	2	2
5	FW	(Brazil)	17	Guilherme Queiróz	1	0	0	1	2
5	MF	(Brazil)	7	Jô	1	0	1	0	2
5	FW	(Brazil)	19	Misael	0	0	0	2	2
5	FW	(Brazil)	20	Neto Costa	0	1	0	1	2
5	DF	(Brazil)	13	William Alves	1	0	0	1	2
6	DF	(Brazil)	16	Bruno Ré	1	0	0	0	1
6	MF	(Brazil)	15	Diego Lorenzi	0	1	0	0	1
6	MF	(Brazil)	16	Jeremias	0	1	0	0	1
6	DF	(Brazil)	3	João Victor	0	0	0	1	1
				Total	10	13	8	24	55

=== Managers performance ===
Name	Nationality	From	To	P	W	D	L	GF	GA	Avg%	Ref
Leston Júnior	Brazil	15 January 2019	18 May 2019	30	11	11	8	37	33	49%	
Milton Mendes	Brazil	25 May 2019	24 August 2019	14	6	4	4	18	18	52%	

== Friendlies ==
=== National ===
9 January 2019	Treze	1–1	Santa Cruz	Campina Grande
(UTC-3)	Juninho 8'	Report	Augusto 12'	Stadium: Estádio Governador Ernani Sátyro (Amigão); Referee: Thiago Galdino

== Official Competitions ==
=== Copa do Nordeste ===
==== Group stage ====
15 January 2019 1	Botafogo–PB	0–0	Santa Cruz	João Pessoa
22:30 (UTC-3)		Report		Stadium: Estádio José Américo de Almeida Filho (Almeidão); Attendance: 4,098; Referee: Pablo Ramon Goncalves Pinheiro

26 January 2019 2	Santa Cruz	1–3	Bahia	São Lourenço da Mata
17:00 (UTC-3)	Elias Carioca 37'	Report	Marcos Martins 19' (o.g.); Gilberto 47', 54'	Stadium: Estádio Governador Carlos Wilson Campos (Arena Pernambuco); Attendance: 7,343; Referee: José Ricardo Vasconcellos Laranjeira

2 February 2019 3	Santa Cruz	1–0	ABC	São Lourenço da Mata
17:00 (UTC-3)	Jô 60'	Report		Stadium: Estádio Governador Carlos Wilson Campos (Arena Pernambuco); Attendance: 5,586; Referee: Ranilton Oliveira de Sousa

9 February 2019 4	Náutico	2–2	Santa Cruz	Recife
19:30 (UTC-3)	Jorge Henrique 27'; Vitão 68' (o.g.)	Report	Pipico 7', 50'	Stadium: Estádio Eládio de Barros Carvalho (Aflitos); Attendance: 6,017; Referee: Marielson Alves Silva

2 March 2019 5	Moto Club	0–1	Santa Cruz	São Luís
16:00 (UTC-3)		Report	Pipico 36'	Stadium: Estádio Governador João Castelo (Castelão); Attendance: 2,258; Referee: Antonio Dib Moraes de Sousa

10 March 2019 6	Santa Cruz	1–1	CSA	Recife
18:00 (UTC-3)	Pipico 50'	Report	Escobar 40'	Stadium: Estádio José do Rego Maciel (Arruda); Attendance: 5,840; Referee: Emerson Ricardo de Almeida Andrade

23 March 2019 7	Ceará	2–1	Santa Cruz	Fortaleza
16:00 (UTC-3)	Thiago Carleto 51'; Ricardo Bueno 86'	Report	Bruno Ré 10'	Stadium: Estádio Governador Plácido Castelo (Castelão); Attendance: 8,540; Referee: Ricarle Gustavo Gonçalves Batista

30 March 2019 8	Santa Cruz	2–0	Confiança	Recife
16:00 (UTC-3)	Vitão 11'; Guilherme Queiróz 83'	Report		Stadium: Estádio José do Rego Maciel (Arruda); Attendance: 3,523; Referee: Adriano Barros Carneiro

==== Quarter-final ====
6 April 2019	Santa Cruz	1–1 (8–7 p)	CRB	Recife
20:00 (UTC-3)	William Alves 90+2'	Report	William Barbio 86'	Stadium: Estádio José do Rego Maciel (Arruda); Attendance: 8,018; Referee: Cláudio Francisco Lima e Silva
	Penalties
	Pipico (penalty scored); Charles (penalty scored); Carlos Renato (penalty scored); Dudu (penalty scored); William Alves (penalty scored); Augusto Potiguar (penalty scored); Ítalo Henrique (penalty scored); Allan Dias (penalty scored)		(penalty scored) Zé Carlos; (penalty scored) Ferrugem; (penalty scored) Daniel Borges; (penalty scored) William Barbio; (penalty scored) Felipe Menezes; (penalty scored) Guilherme Mattis; (penalty scored) Igor; (penalty missed) Mailson

==== Semi-final ====
9 May 2019	Fortaleza	1–0	Santa Cruz	Fortaleza
21:30 (UTC-3)	Romarinho 77'	Report		Stadium: Estádio Governador Plácido Castelo (Castelão); Attendance: 30,495; Referee: Marielson Alves Silva

==== Record ====
Final Position	Points	Matches	Wins	Draws	Losses	Goals For	Goals Away	Avg%
4th	13	10	3	4	3	10	10	43%

=== Campeonato Pernambucano ===
==== First stage ====
20 January 2019 1	Santa Cruz	3–0	América–PE	São Lourenço da Mata
(UTC-3)	Vitão 35', 80'; Elias Carioca 41'	Report		Stadium: Estádio Governador Carlos Wilson Campos (Arena Pernambuco); Attendance: 4,045; Referee: Luiz Cláudio Sobral

23 January 2019 2	Flamengo de Arcoverde	1–1	Santa Cruz	Arcoverde
(UTC-3)	Pedro 68' (pen.)	Report	Augusto 48' (pen.)	Stadium: Estádio Municipal Áureo Bradley; Attendance: 1,850; Referee: Sebastião Rufino Ribeiro Filho

29 January 2019 3	Santa Cruz	4–1	Afogados da Ingazeira	São Lourenço da Mata
(UTC-3)	Neto Costa 4'; Diego Lorenzi 23'; Elias Carioca 31'; Allan Dias 90'	Report	Diego Ceará 5'	Stadium: Estádio Governador Carlos Wilson Campos (Arena Pernambuco); Attendance: 2,793; Referee: Diego Fernando

6 February 2019 4	Petrolina	1–2	Santa Cruz	Petrolina
21:15 (UTC-3)	Jefferson Petrolina 90' (pen.)	Report	Jeremias 45+2'; Augusto 60' (pen.)	Stadium: Estádio Paulo de Souza Coelho; Referee: José Woshington

17 February 2019 6	Santa Cruz	1–0	Sport	Recife
17:00 (UTC-3)	Allan Dias 73'	Report		Stadium: Estádio José do Rego Maciel (Arruda); Attendance: 16,483; Referee: Luiz Sobral

26 February 2019 5	Vitória das Tabocas	3–0	Santa Cruz	São Lourenço da Mata
(UTC-3)	Fabinho 16'; Erverson 30'; Rafael Paulista 86'	Report		Stadium: Estádio Governador Carlos Wilson Campos (Arena Pernambuco); Attendance: 1,052; Referee: Diego Fernando

6 March 2019 7	Salgueiro	2–0	Santa Cruz	Salgueiro
(UTC-3)	Guilherme Lucena 72'; João Victor 75' (o.g.)	Report		Stadium: Estádio Cornélio de Barros

14 March 2019 8	Santa Cruz	1–0	Central	Recife
(UTC-3)	Allan Dias 65'	Report		Stadium: Estádio José do Rego Maciel (Arruda)

17 March 2019 9	Náutico	0–0	Santa Cruz	Recife
16:00 (UTC-3)		Report		Stadium: Estádio Eládio de Barros Carvalho (Aflitos); Referee: Pericles Bassols

==== Quarter-final ====
27 March 2019	Santa Cruz	1–1 (1–3 p)	Afogados da Ingazeira	Recife
(UTC-3)	Allan Dias 66'	Report	Rodrigo 45'	Stadium: Estádio José do Rego Maciel (Arruda); Attendance: 3,259; Referee: Deborah Cecilia Correia
	Penalties
	Penalty scored		Penalty scored

==== Record ====
Final Position	Points	Matches	Wins	Draws	Losses	Goals For	Goals Away	Avg%
5th	18	10	5	3	2	13	9	60%

=== Copa do Brasil ===
==== First round ====
14 February 2019	Sinop	1–2	Santa Cruz	Sinop
22:30 (UTC-3)	Igor 89'	Report	Elias Carioca 5'; Pipico 73' (pen.)	Stadium: Estádio Municipal Gigante do Norte; Attendance: 1,989; Referee: Adriano Milczvski

==== Second round ====
20 February 2019	Santa Cruz	1–1 (4–2 p)	Náutico	Recife
21:30 (UTC-3)	Pipico 28'	Report	Jorge Henrique 34'	Stadium: Estádio José do Rego Maciel (Arruda); Attendance: 15,288; Referee: Flávio Rodrigues de Souza
	Penalties
	Pipico (penalty scored); Guilherme Queiróz (penalty scored); Luiz Felipe (penalty scored); Marcos Martins (penalty scored)		(penalty missed) Tharcysio; (penalty scored) Thiago; (penalty scored) Robinho; (penalty missed) Luiz Henrique

==== Third round ====
3 April 2019	ABC	1–0	Santa Cruz	Natal
21:30 (UTC-3)	Rodrigo Rodrigues 80'	Report		Stadium: Estádio Maria Lamas Farache (Frasqueirão); Attendance: 1,931; Referee: Bruno Arleu de Araújo

10 April 2019	Santa Cruz	3–0	ABC	Recife
21:30 (UTC-3)	Pipico 40', 48' (pen.); Charles Almeida 45+2'	Report		Stadium: Estádio José do Rego Maciel (Arruda); Attendance: 16,580; Referee: Igor Junio Benevenuto

==== Fourth round ====
17 April 2019	Fluminense	2–0	Santa Cruz	Rio de Janeiro
21:30 (UTC-3)	Gilberto 18'; Luciano 30'	Report		Stadium: Estádio Jornalista Mário Filho (Maracanã); Attendance: 19,860; Referee: Sávio Pereira Sampaio

25 April 2019	Santa Cruz	2–0 (2–3 p)	Fluminense	Recife
21:30 (UTC-3)	Jô 71'; Pipico 75'	Report		Stadium: Estádio José do Rego Maciel (Arruda); Attendance: 25,802; Referee: Flávio Rodrigues de Souza
	Penalties
	Pipico (penalty scored); Charles Almeida (penalty missed); Marcos Martins (penalty missed); Guilherme Queiróz (penalty scored); William Alves (penalty missed)		(penalty scored) Luciano; (penalty missed) Gilberto; (penalty scored) Pedro; (penalty scored) Airton

==== Record ====
Final Position	Points	Matches	Wins	Draws	Losses	Goals For	Goals Away	Avg%
20th	10	6	3	1	2	8	5	55%

=== Série C ===
==== First stage ====
29 April 2019 1	Santa Cruz	2–2	Treze	Recife
20:00 (UTC-3)	Neto Costa 84'; Guilherme Queiróz 90+5'	Report	Gil 5'; Eduardo dos Santos 23'	Stadium: Estádio José do Rego Maciel (Arruda); Attendance: 8,194; Referee: Felipe Duarte Varejão

5 May 2019 2	Ferroviário	3–0	Santa Cruz	Fortaleza
18:00 (UTC-3)	Leanderson 18'; Léo Jaime 44'; Caxito 54'	Report		Stadium: Estádio Governador Plácido Castelo (Castelão); Attendance: 1,708; Referee: Alisson Sidnei Furtado

13 May 2019 3	Botafogo–PB	1–1	Santa Cruz	João Pessoa
20:00 (UTC-3)	Felipe Alves 17'	Report	Pipico 6'	Stadium: Estádio José Américo de Almeida Filho (Almeidão); Attendance: 6,899; Referee: Wanderson Alves de Sousa

18 May 2019 4	Santa Cruz	3–3	Sampaio Corrêa	Recife
17:15 (UTC-3)	Everton 5'; Misael 16'; William Alves 77'	Report	Salatiel 9', 45+1'; Ullisses 82'	Stadium: Estádio José do Rego Maciel (Arruda); Attendance: 5,979; Referee: Alinor Silva da Paixão

25 May 2019 5	Santa Cruz	2–1	ABC	Recife
19:15 (UTC-3)	Pipico 76'; Misael 90+2'	Report	Jefinho 72'	Stadium: Estádio José do Rego Maciel (Arruda); Attendance: 7,746; Referee: Denis da Silva Ribeiro Serafim

1 June 2019 6	Imperatriz	0–1	Santa Cruz	Imperatriz
19:15 (UTC-3)		Report	Dudu 23'	Stadium: Estádio Municipal Frei Epifânio d’Abadia; Attendance: 2,640; Referee: Wasley do Couto Leão

9 June 2019 7	Santa Cruz	3–1	Confiança	Recife
18:00 (UTC-3)	João Victor 4'; Pipico 30', 87'	Report	Pingo 77'	Stadium: Estádio José do Rego Maciel (Arruda); Attendance: 10,136; Referee: Andrey da Silva e Silva

17 June 2019 8	Globo	3–3	Santa Cruz	Ceará-Mirim
20:00 (UTC-3)	Bambam 31', 78'; Negueba 72'	Report	Dudu 53'; Pipico 85', 90+3'	Stadium: Estádio Manoel Dantas Barretto (Barrettão); Attendance: 258; Referee: Philip Georg Bennett

22 June 2019 9	Santa Cruz	1–0	Náutico	Recife
18:00 (UTC-3)	Pipico 64'	Report		Stadium: Estádio José do Rego Maciel (Arruda); Attendance: 9,903; Referee: Eduardo Tomaz de Aquino Valadão

27 June 2019 10	Treze	2–0	Santa Cruz	Campina Grande
19:00 (UTC-3)	Vanger 38'; Eduardo dos Santos 87'	Report		Stadium: Estádio Governador Ernani Sátyro (Amigão); Attendance: 1,035; Referee: Grazianni Maciel Rocha

5 July 2019 11	Santa Cruz	0–2	Ferroviário	Recife
20:00 (UTC-3)		Report	Isaac Prado 70'; Mazinho 84'	Stadium: Estádio José do Rego Maciel (Arruda); Attendance: 25,084; Referee: Ronei Candido Alves

14 July 2019 12	Santa Cruz	1–1	Botafogo–PB	Recife
18:00 (UTC-3)	Charles Almeida 90+4'	Report	Kelvin 89'	Stadium: Estádio José do Rego Maciel (Arruda); Attendance: 6,971; Referee: João Batista de Arruda

18 July 2019 13	Sampaio Corrêa	1–0	Santa Cruz	São Luís
20:00 (UTC-3)	Roney 24'	Report		Stadium: Estádio Governador João Castelo (Castelão); Attendance: 4,006; Referee: Vinicius Gonçalves Dias Araujo

27 July 2019 14	ABC	0–0	Santa Cruz	Natal
17:00 (UTC-3)		Report		Stadium: Estádio Maria Lamas Farache (Frasqueirão); Attendance: 7,174; Referee: Andrey da Silva e Silva

2 August 2019 15	Santa Cruz	3–2	Imperatriz	São Lourenço da Mata
20:00 (UTC-3)	Everton 32'; Vitão 89'; Augusto 90+1'	Report	Gabriel Caju 29'; Matheus 83'	Stadium: Estádio Governador Carlos Wilson Campos (Arena Pernambuco); Attendance: 5,124; Referee: Felipe Gomes da Silva

11 August 2019 16	Confiança	1–1	Santa Cruz	Aracaju
18:00 (UTC-3)	Anderson 12'	Report	Charles Almeida 20'	Stadium: Estádio Lourival Baptista (Batistão); Attendance: 10,427; Referee: Denis da Silva Ribeiro Serafim

18 August 2019 17	Santa Cruz	2–1	Globo	Recife
18:00 (UTC-3)	Elias Carioca 16'; Charles Almeida 84'	Report	Cláudio Murici 90+2'	Stadium: Estádio José do Rego Maciel (Arruda); Attendance: 19,773; Referee: Rodrigo Carvalhaes de Miranda

24 August 2019 18	Náutico	3–1	Santa Cruz	Recife
17:00 (UTC-3)	Diego Silva 30'; Jean Carlos 45+1'; Jhonnatan 49'	Report	Dudu 52'	Stadium: Estádio Eládio de Barros Carvalho (Aflitos); Attendance: 9,689; Referee: Wagner do Nascimento Magalhães

==== Record ====
Final Position	Points	Matches	Wins	Draws	Losses	Goals For	Goals Away	Avg%
13th	25	18	6	7	5	24	27	46%
