= 2026 Figueirense FC season =

Figueirense FC
2026 season
- Manager: Waguinho Dias (until 23 January); Márcio Zanardi (25 January – 14 April); Raul Cabral (from 14 April)
- Stadium: Estádio Orlando Scarpelli
- Série C: 13th
- Recopa Santa Catarina: Runners-up
- Copa do Brasil: Fourth round

The 2025–26 season is the sixth consecutive season for Figueirense Futebol Clube in the Campeonato Brasileiro Série C. In addition, the club participated in the Campeonato Catarinense, the Recopa Santa Catarina, and the Copa do Brasil.

== Transfers ==
=== In ===
Pos.	Player	Transferred from	Fee	Date	Source
DF	(Brazil) Jhonnathan	(Brazil) Chapecoense	Undisclosed	30 January 2026	
DF	(Brazil) Vitor Ricardo	(Brazil) Botafogo-PB	Undisclosed	22 February 2026	
DF	(Brazil) Leonan	(Brazil) Capivariano	Loan	26 February 2026	
FW	(Brazil) Mailson	(Brazil) Chapecoense	Loan	13 March 2026	
FW	(Brazil) Emerson Galego	(Brazil) Juventude	Loan	30 March 2026	

== Competitions ==
=== Overall record ===
Competition	First match	Last match	Starting round	Final position	Record							
Competition	First match	Last match	Starting round	Final position	Pld	W	D	L	GF	GA	GD	Win %
Série C	6 April 2026	2026	Matchday 1		16	5	6	5	15	20	−5	31.25
Campeonato Catarinense	7 January 2026	6 March 2026			6	2	1	3	6	8	−2	33.33
Recopa Santa Catarina	15 March 2026		Final	Runners-up	1	0	0	1	2	4	−2	0.00
Copa do Brasil	3 March 2026	18 March 2026	Second round	Fourth round	3	2	0	1	2	1	+1	66.67
Total					26	9	7	10	25	33	−8	34.62

Last updated: 8 August 2026
Source: Competitions

=== Série C ===
Pos	Team	Pld	W	D	L	GF	GA	GD	Pts
13	Floresta	16	5	6	5	17	19	−2	21
14	Maranhão	16	5	6	5	13	15	−2	21
15	Figueirense	16	5	6	5	15	20	−5	21
16	Volta Redonda	16	5	3	8	11	21	−10	18
17	Itabaiana	16	4	5	7	13	20	−7	17

Updated to match(es) played on 10 August 2026. Source: CBF
Rules for classification: 1) points; 2) wins; 3) goal difference; 4) goals scored; 5) fewest red cards; 6) fewest yellow cards; 7) draw.

==== Results by round ====
Round	1	2	3	4	5	6
Ground	A	H	H	A	H	A
Result	D	L	W	L	L	W
Position						

Updated to match(es) played on 10 May 2026. Source:
A = Away; H = Home; W = Win; D = Draw; L = Loss

==== Matches ====
6 April 2026 1	Ypiranga	1–1	Figueirense	Erechim
20:00				Stadium: Estádio Olímpico Colosso da Lagoa; Referee: Renan Novaes Insabralde

13 April 2026 2	Figueirense	1–3	Maringá	Florianópolis
20:00				Stadium: Estádio Orlando Scarpelli; Referee: Wagner Francisco Silva Souza

19 April 2026 3	Figueirense	2–1	Botafogo-PB	Florianópolis
18:30				Stadium: Estádio Orlando Scarpelli; Referee: Fabiano Monteiro dos Santos

26 April 2026 4	Anápolis	3–1	Figueirense	Anápolis
17:00				Stadium: Estádio Jonas Duarte; Referee: Marcel Phillipe Santos Martins

5 May 2026 5	Figueirense	0–3	Barra	Florianópolis
20:00				Stadium: Estádio Orlando Scarpelli

10 May 2026 6	Amazonas	0–1	Figueirense	Manaus
16:00 UTC−4				Stadium: Estádio Municipal Carlos Zamith; Referee: Marcio dos Santos Oliveira

16 May 2026 7	Figueirense	0–1	Itabaiana	Florianópolis
19:30				Stadium: Estádio Orlando Scarpelli

24 May 2026 8	Confiança	0–0	Figueirense

31 May 2026 9	Figueirense	2–1	Paysandu	Florianópolis
				Stadium: Estádio Orlando Scarpelli

14 June 2026 10	Floresta	1–2	Figueirense

20 June 2026 11	Ituano	0–0	Figueirense

28 June 2026 12	Figueirense	1–1	Guarani	Florianópolis
				Stadium: Estádio Orlando Scarpelli

6 July 2026 13	Brusque	3–1	Figueirense

13 July 2026 14	Figueirense	0–0	Volta Redonda	Florianópolis
				Stadium: Estádio Orlando Scarpelli

25 July 2026 15	Santa Cruz	0–1	Figueirense

8 August 2026 16	Figueirense	2–2	Ferroviária	Florianópolis
17:00				Stadium: Estádio Orlando Scarpelli

=== Campeonato Catarinense ===
==== Results by round ====
Round	1	2	3	4	5	6
Ground	A	H	A	H	A	H
Result	W	W	L	L	L	D
Position						

A = Away; H = Home; W = Win; D = Draw; L = Loss

7 January 2026 1	Joinville	2–3	Figueirense
20:00

10 January 2026 2	Figueirense	1–0	Marcílio Dias
16:00

14 January 2026 3	Brusque	2–1	Figueirense
21:30

18 January 2026 4	Figueirense	0–2	Avai
18:00

22 January 2026 5	Concórdia	1–0	Figueirense
20:15

25 January 2026 6	Figueirense	1–1	Camboriú
18:00

==== Results by round ====
Round	1	2	3	4	5	6
Ground	A	H	A	H	A	H
Result	L	W	L	L	W	L
Position						

A = Away; H = Home; W = Win; D = Draw; L = Loss

2 February 2026 1	Carlos Renaux	1–0	Figueirense
19:00

6 February 2026 2	Figueirense	1–0	Joinville
20:00

13 February 2026 3	Marcílio Dias	1–0	Figueirense
19:30

20 February 2026 4	Figueirense	0–1	Marcílio Dias
20:00

27 February 2026 5	Joinville	0–3	Figueirense
20:00

6 March 2026 6	Figueirense	2–4	Carlos Renaux
20:00

=== Recopa Santa Catarina ===
15 March 2026	Avaí	4–2	Figueirense	Florianópolis
18:00				Stadium: Estádio da Ressacada

=== Copa do Brasil ===
3 March 2026 Second round	Figueirense	1–0	Azuriz

12 March 2026 Third round	Amazonas	0–1	Figueirense

18 March 2026 Fourth round	CRB	1–0	Figueirense
21:00
