= 2016 J1 League =

24th season of J1 League

Meiji Yasuda J1 League
- Season: 2016
- Champions: Kashima Antlers; 8th J.League title 8th Japanese title
- Relegated: Nagoya Grampus; Shonan Bellmare; Avispa Fukuoka
- AFC Champions League: Kashima Antlers; Urawa Red Diamonds; Kawasaki Frontale; Gamba Osaka
- Club World Cup: Kashima Antlers
- Matches: 306
- Goals: 805 (2.63 per match)
- Top goalscorer: Leandro (Vissel Kobe); Peter Utaka (Sanfrecce Hiroshima) (19 goals each)
- Highest attendance: 59,837; Urawa vs Kashima (3 December)
- Lowest attendance: 5,870; Fukuoka vs Nagoya (2 July)
- Average attendance: 17,968
- All statistics correct as of 3 November 2016.

The 2016 Meiji Yasuda J1 League (2016 明治安田生命J1リーグ) season was the 51st season of top-flight football in Japan and the 24th since the establishment of the J.League in 1992. This was second season of J1 League as renamed from J. League Division 1.

This season was the second since J.League changed its competition format to a newly conceived multistage system, with the year split into two halves and a third and final championship stage. The winners of the first and second stages and the highest ranking club of the aggregate table (other than the first or second stage winners) qualified for the Championship Stage. Kashima Antlers, the winner of the championship stage, advanced to the 2016 FIFA Club World Cup as the host nation's entrant.

== Clubs ==
Locations of the 2016 J1 League teams

Club name	Home town(s)	Stadium	Capacity	Note(s)
Albirex Niigata	Niigata City & Seirō, Niigata	Denka Big Swan Stadium	42,300	15th in 2015
Avispa Fukuoka	Fukuoka City, Fukuoka	Level-5 Stadium	22,563	Promoted from J2 League in 2015 (through a play-off system)
FC Tokyo	Tokyo	Ajinomoto Stadium	49,970	2016 AFC Champions League participant (as 2015 J1 League fourth-placed team)
Gamba Osaka	Northern Osaka Prefecture (Note: Suita, Ibaraki, Takatsuki, Toyonaka, Ikeda, Settsu, Minoh)	Suita City Football Stadium	40,000	2016 AFC Champions League participant (as 2015 J1 League third-placed team and Emperor's Cup winners)
Júbilo Iwata	Iwata, Shizuoka	Yamaha Stadium	15,165	Promoted from J2 League in 2015
Kashima Antlers	Southeast Ibaraki Prefecture (Note: Kashima, Kamisu, Itako, Hokota, Namegata)	Kashima Soccer Stadium	40,728	5th in 2015
Kashiwa Reysol	Kashiwa, Chiba	Kashiwa Soccer Stadium	15,900	10th in 2015
Kawasaki Frontale	Kawasaki, Kanagawa	Todoroki Athletics Stadium	26,232	6th in 2015
Nagoya Grampus	All Aichi Prefecture (Note: centering on Nagoya, Toyota, Miyoshi)	Paloma Mizuho Stadium	27,000	9th in 2015
Omiya Ardija	Saitama City, Saitama	NACK5 Stadium	15,500	Promoted from J2 League in 2015
Sagan Tosu	Tosu, Saga	Tosu Stadium	24,490	11th in 2015
Sanfrecce Hiroshima	Hiroshima City, Hiroshima	Hiroshima Big Arch	50,000	2016 AFC Champions League participant (as 2015 J1 League winners)
Shonan Bellmare	Shōnan part of Kanagawa (Note: Hiratsuka, Atsugi, Isehara, Odawara, Chigasaki, Hadano, Fujisawa, Ōiso, Samukawa, Ninomiya)	Shonan Stadium Hiratsuka	18,500	8th in 2015
Urawa Red Diamonds	Saitama City, Saitama	Saitama Stadium	63,700	2016 AFC Champions League participant (as 2015 J1 League runners-up)
Vegalta Sendai	Sendai, Miyagi	Yurtec Stadium	19,694	14th in 2015
Ventforet Kofu	All Yamanashi Prefecture (Note: centering on Kōfu and Nirasaki)	Yamanashi Chuo Bank Stadium	17,000	13th in 2015
Vissel Kobe	Kobe, Hyōgo	Misaki Park Stadium	30,132	12th in 2015
Yokohama F. Marinos	Yokohama & Yokosuka, Kanagawa	Nissan Stadium	72,327	7th in 2015

=== Personnel and kits ===
Club name	Head coach	Kit manufacturer	Front shirt sponsor
Albirex Niigata	(Japan) Tatsuma Yoshida	Adidas	HAPPY Turn's
Avispa Fukuoka	(Japan) Masami Ihara	Athleta	Fukuoka Jisho
FC Tokyo	(Japan) Yoshiyuki Shinoda	Umbro	Lifeval
Gamba Osaka	(Japan) Kenta Hasegawa	Umbro	Panasonic
Júbilo Iwata	(Japan) Hiroshi Nanami	Puma	Yamaha
Kashima Antlers	(Japan) Masatada Ishii	Nike	Lixil
Kashiwa Reysol	(Japan) Takahiro Shimotaira	Yonex	Hitachi
Kawasaki Frontale	(Japan) Yahiro Kazama	Puma	Fujitsu (home); Arrows (away)
Nagoya Grampus	(North Macedonia) Boško Gjurovski	Le Coq Sportif	Toyota
Omiya Ardija	(Japan) Hiroki Shibuya	Under Armour	Docomo Hikari
Sagan Tosu	(Italy) Massimo Ficcadenti	New Balance	DHC
Sanfrecce Hiroshima	(Japan) Hajime Moriyasu	Nike	EDION
Shonan Bellmare	(South Korea) Cho Kwi-jae	Penalty	Sanei Architecture Planning
Urawa Red Diamonds	(Serbia) Mihailo Petrović	Nike	Polus
Vegalta Sendai	(Japan) Susumu Watanabe	Adidas	Iris Ohyama
Ventforet Kofu	(Japan) Satoru Sakuma	Mizuno	Hakubaku
Vissel Kobe	(Brazil) Nelsinho Baptista	Asics	Rakuten
Yokohama F. Marinos	(France) Erick Mombaerts	Adidas	Nissan

=== Managerial changes ===
Team	Outgoing manager	Date of separation	Manner of departure	Incoming manager	Date of announcement
Kashiwa Reysol	(Japan) Tatsuma Yoshida	End of 2015 season	Mutual consent	(Brazil) Milton Mendes	30 October 2015
Nagoya Grampus	(Japan) Akira Nishino	End of 2015 season	Mutual consent	(Japan) Takafumi Ogura	24 November 2015
Albirex Niigata	(Japan) Masaaki Yanagishita	End of 2015 season	Mutual consent	(Japan) Tatsuma Yoshida	12 December 2015
FC Tokyo	(Italy) Massimo Ficcadenti	27 November 2015	Signed by Sagan Tosu	(Japan) Hiroshi Jofuku	28 December 2015
Sagan Tosu	(Japan) Hitoshi Morishita	7 January 2016	Contract terminated	(Italy) Massimo Ficcadenti	7 January 2016
Kashiwa Reysol	(Brazil) Milton Mendes	12 March 2016	Resigned	(Japan) Takahiro Shimotaira	12 March 2016
FC Tokyo	(Japan) Hiroshi Jofuku	24 July 2016	Sacked	(Japan) Yoshiyuki Shinoda	26 July 2016
Nagoya Grampus	(Japan) Takafumi Ogura	23 August 2016	Sacked	(North Macedonia) Boško Gjurovski	23 August 2016

=== Foreign players ===
Players name in bold indicates the player is registered during the mid-season transfer window.

Club	Player 1	Player 2	Player 3	AFC player	Non-visa foreign	Type-C contract	Former players
Albirex Niigata	(Brazil) Bruno Cortez	(Brazil) Léo Silva	(Brazil) Rafael Silva			(Brazil) Leonardo Kalil	(South Korea) Lim You-hwan
Avispa Fukuoka	(Brazil) Wellington	(Colombia) Danilson Córdoba	(South Korea) Kim Hyun-hun	(South Korea) Lee Bum-young			
FC Tokyo	(Australia) Nathan Burns	(Brazil) **Muriqui**		(South Korea) Yu In-soo			(South Korea) Ha Dae-sung (Spain) Francisco Sandaza
Gamba Osaka	(Brazil) Ademilson	(Brazil) Patric		(South Korea) Oh Jae-suk	(South Korea) Kim Jung-ya		
Júbilo Iwata	(Brazil) Adaílton	(England) Jay Bothroyd	(Poland) Krzysztof Kamiński	(Greece) **Avraam Papadopoulos** ^{1}			
Kashima Antlers	(Brazil) **Fabrício**			(South Korea) Hwang Seok-ho	(Brazil) Bueno		(Brazil) Caio (Brazil) Dinei
Kashiwa Reysol	(Brazil) **Cristiano**	(Brazil) Diego Oliveira				(Brazil) Dudu	(Brazil) Éderson (Brazil) Juliano Mineiro (Brazil) Patrick
Kawasaki Frontale	(Brazil) Eduardo	(Brazil) Eduardo Neto	(Brazil) Elsinho	(South Korea) Jung Sung-ryong			
Nagoya Grampus	(South Korea) **Ha Dae-sung**	(Sweden) Ludvig Öhman	(Sweden) Robin Simović	(South Korea) Lee Seung-hee		(Brazil) Gustavo	
Omiya Ardija	(Brazil) Mateus	(Serbia) Dragan Mrđa	(Slovenia) Nejc Pecnik				
Sagan Tosu	(Algeria) **Aymen Tahar**	(Morocco) **Moestafa El Kabir**	(South Korea) Kim Min-hyeok	(South Korea) Kim Min-woo			(South Korea) Baek Sung-dong (South Korea) Choi Sung-keun
Sanfrecce Hiroshima	(Brazil) **Anderson Lopes**	(Croatia) Mihael Mikić	(Nigeria) Peter Utaka				(South Korea) Kim Byeom-yong
Shonan Bellmare	(Brazil) André Bahia	(Brazil) **Dinei**	(Brazil) **Weslley**	(Australia) Tando Velaphi		(South Korea) Park Tae-hwan	(Brazil) Paulinho (Brazil) Thiago Quirino
Urawa Red Diamonds	(Slovenia) Branko Ilić	(Slovenia) Zlatan Ljubijankić					
Vegalta Sendai	(Brazil) **Pablo Diogo**	(Brazil) Ramon Lopes	(Brazil) Wilson	(South Korea) Kim Min-tae	(North Korea) Ryang Yong-gi		
Ventforet Kofu	(Brazil) **Davi**	(Brazil) **Dudu**	(Brazil) **Marquinhos Paraná**	(Australia) Billy Celeski			(Brazil) Cristiano (Brazil) Gilton (Brazil) Nilson
Vissel Kobe	(Brazil) Leandro	(Brazil) **Nílton**	(Brazil) Pedro Júnior	(South Korea) Kim Seung-gyu			
Yokohama F. Marinos	(Brazil) Fábio	(Brazil) Kayke	(Curaçao) Quenten Martinus	(South Korea) Park Jeong-su			

- **^1** Avraam Papadopoulos owns Australian citizenship and was counted as an Asian player.

== Format ==
Teams play a single round-robin in the first stage and a single round-robin in the second stage. After that an overall table is calculated and a championship stage is played. The winners of the first and second stages and any team that finishes in the top 3 of the overall rankings advance to the championship stage. The team that finishes atop the overall table automatically qualifies for the final, while the remaining teams play-off for the other spot in the final.

== League table ==
=== First stage ===
Pos	Team	Pld	W	D	L	GF	GA	GD	Pts	Qualification
1	Kashima Antlers (Q)	17	12	3	2	29	10	+19	39	Champions League group stage and J.League Championship 1st Round
2	Kawasaki Frontale	17	11	5	1	33	15	+18	38	
3	Urawa Red Diamonds	17	10	3	4	26	16	+10	33	
4	Sanfrecce Hiroshima	17	8	5	4	32	18	+14	29	
5	Omiya Ardija	17	7	5	5	17	18	−1	26	
6	Gamba Osaka	17	7	3	7	22	20	+2	24	
7	Kashiwa Reysol	17	6	6	5	20	21	−1	24	
8	Júbilo Iwata	17	6	5	6	21	23	−2	23	
9	FC Tokyo	17	6	5	6	16	18	−2	23	
10	Vegalta Sendai	17	7	2	8	20	25	−5	23	
11	Yokohama F. Marinos	17	6	4	7	21	19	+2	22	
12	Vissel Kobe	17	5	5	7	23	25	−2	20	
13	Albirex Niigata	17	4	6	7	19	25	−6	18	
14	Nagoya Grampus	17	4	5	8	24	29	−5	17	
15	Sagan Tosu	17	4	5	8	10	15	−5	17	
16	Shonan Bellmare	17	4	4	9	18	27	−9	16	
17	Ventforet Kofu	17	3	6	8	18	31	−13	15	
18	Avispa Fukuoka	17	2	5	10	11	25	−14	11	

Source: 2016 MEIJI YASUDA J1 LEAGUE 1st Stage League table
Rules for classification: 1) Points; 2) Goal difference; 3) Goals scored.
(Q) Qualified for the phase indicated

=== Second stage ===
Pos	Team	Pld	W	D	L	GF	GA	GD	Pts	Qualification
1	Urawa Red Diamonds (Q)	17	13	2	2	35	12	+23	41	Champions League group stage and J.League Championship Final
2	Vissel Kobe	17	11	2	4	33	18	+15	35	
3	Kawasaki Frontale	17	11	1	5	35	24	+11	34	
4	Gamba Osaka	17	10	4	3	31	22	+9	34	
5	Kashiwa Reysol	17	9	3	5	32	23	+9	30	
6	Omiya Ardija	17	8	6	3	24	18	+6	30	
7	Yokohama F. Marinos	17	7	8	2	32	19	+13	29	
8	Sagan Tosu	17	8	5	4	26	22	+4	29	
9	FC Tokyo	17	9	2	6	23	21	+2	29	
10	Sanfrecce Hiroshima	17	8	2	7	26	22	+4	26	
11	Kashima Antlers	17	6	2	9	24	24	0	20	
12	Vegalta Sendai	17	6	2	9	19	23	−4	20	
13	Ventforet Kofu	17	4	4	9	14	27	−13	16	
14	Júbilo Iwata	17	2	7	8	16	27	−11	13	
15	Nagoya Grampus	17	3	4	10	14	29	−15	13	
16	Albirex Niigata	17	4	0	13	14	24	−10	12	
17	Shonan Bellmare	17	3	2	12	12	29	−17	11	
18	Avispa Fukuoka	17	2	2	13	15	41	−26	8	

Source: 2016 MEIJI YASUDA J1 LEAGUE 2nd Stage League table
Rules for classification: 1) Points; 2) Goal difference; 3) Goals scored.
(Q) Qualified for the phase indicated

=== Overall table ===
Pos	Team	Pld	W	D	L	GF	GA	GD	Pts	Qualification or relegation
1	Urawa Red Diamonds	34	23	5	6	61	28	+33	74	Champions League group stage and J. League Championship Final
2	Kawasaki Frontale	34	22	6	6	68	39	+29	72	Champions League group stage and J. League Championship 1st Round
3	Kashima Antlers (C)	34	18	5	11	53	34	+19	59	Club World Cup, Champions League group stage and J. League Championship 1st Round
4	Gamba Osaka	34	17	7	10	53	42	+11	58	Champions League play-off round (Note: The winner of the 2016 Emperor's Cup qualified for the group stage of the 2017 AFC Champions League. Since the Emperor's Cup winner Kashima Antlers had already qualified for the AFC Champions League, the play-off round spot was awarded to the fourth-placed team.)
5	Omiya Ardija	34	15	11	8	41	36	+5	56	
6	Sanfrecce Hiroshima	34	16	7	11	58	40	+18	55	
7	Vissel Kobe	34	16	7	11	56	43	+13	55	
8	Kashiwa Reysol	34	15	9	10	52	44	+8	54	
9	FC Tokyo	34	15	7	12	39	39	0	52	
10	Yokohama F. Marinos	34	13	12	9	53	38	+15	51	
11	Sagan Tosu	34	12	10	12	36	37	−1	46	
12	Vegalta Sendai	34	13	4	17	39	48	−9	43	
13	Júbilo Iwata	34	8	12	14	37	50	−13	36	
14	Ventforet Kofu	34	7	10	17	32	58	−26	31	
15	Albirex Niigata	34	8	6	20	33	49	−16	30	
16	Nagoya Grampus (R)	34	7	9	18	38	58	−20	30	Relegation to 2017 J2 League
17	Shonan Bellmare (R)	34	7	6	21	30	56	−26	27	Relegation to 2017 J2 League
18	Avispa Fukuoka (R)	34	4	7	23	26	66	−40	19	Relegation to 2017 J2 League

Source: Meiji Yasuda J1 League
Rules for classification: 1) Points; 2) Goal difference; 3) Goals scored.
(C) Champions; (R) Relegated

== Positions by round ==
=== First stage ===
Team ╲ Round	1	2	3	4	5	6	7	8	9	10	11	12	13	14	15	16	17
Kashima Antlers	5	2	7	3	3	2	2	3	3	3	3	3	2	2	2	1	1
Kawasaki Frontale	5	3	1	1	2	1	1	2	2	2	2	1	1	1	1	2	2
Urawa Red Diamonds	2	7	2	2	1	3	3	1	1	1	1	2	3	3	3	3	3
Sanfrecce Hiroshima	13	16	16	11	7	10	5	4	7	7	6	6	8	6	5	4	4
Omiya Ardija	5	1	3	10	10	6	6	6	5	5	5	4	4	4	4	5	5
Gamba Osaka	13	12	4	7	12	8	8	8	9	11	10	8	6	8	8	6	6
Kashiwa Reysol	10	18	17	17	16	14	9	7	4	4	4	5	5	5	6	7	7
Júbilo Iwata	13	8	9	12	11	7	10	9	6	6	8	9	7	9	11	12	8
FC Tokyo	13	8	4	9	6	9	11	12	13	13	12	12	12	11	12	11	9
Vegalta Sendai	5	8	4	7	13	15	15	15	16	17	14	14	13	12	10	8	10
Yokohama F. Marinos	13	16	11	5	4	4	4	5	8	9	9	10	9	7	7	9	11
Vissel Kobe	18	5	13	6	5	5	7	10	10	8	7	7	10	10	9	10	12
Albirex Niigata	2	13	14	14	9	13	14	14	15	15	15	15	15	15	16	15	13
Nagoya Grampus	5	4	9	4	8	11	13	11	12	10	11	11	11	13	13	14	14
Sagan Tosu	2	8	11	13	14	16	16	16	14	14	16	16	16	17	15	13	15
Shonan Bellmare	10	14	15	16	17	18	18	18	18	16	17	18	18	16	17	16	16
Ventforet Kofu	1	6	8	15	15	12	12	13	11	12	13	13	14	14	14	17	17
Avispa Fukuoka	10	15	18	18	18	17	17	17	17	18	18	17	17	18	18	18	18

Leader and qualification to 2016 J.League Championship

Source: J. League data site
Notes:
1. Two games for Matchday 7 (Avispa Fukuoka vs. Nagoya Grampus and Sagan Tosu vs. Vissel Kobe), scheduled on 16 April 2016, were affected by the series of earthquakes in Kumamoto prefecture, and thus postponed and rescheduled on 2 June 2016. Results of these matches were included in Matchday 15 ranking.
2. Matchday 10 results for 2016 AFC Champions League Participants (FC Tokyo vs. Sanfrecce Hiroshima; Gamba Osaka vs. Urawa Red Diamonds), held on 15 June 2016, were included in Matchday 16 ranking.
3. Matchday 13 results for 2016 AFC Champions League Knockout Stage Participants (Urawa Red Diamonds vs. FC Tokyo), held on 22 June 2016, were included in Matchday 17 ranking.

=== Second stage ===
Team ╲ Round	1	2	3	4	5	6	7	8	9	10	11	12	13	14	15	16	17
Urawa Red Diamonds	7	4	3	3	2	2	2	1	2	2	2	1	1	1	1	1	1
Vissel Kobe	1	5	8	6	9	7	8	7	6	5	4	5	4	2	3	3	2
Kawasaki Frontale	1	1	1	2	1	1	1	2	1	1	1	3	2	3	2	2	3
Gamba Osaka	5	3	4	4	7	6	4	3	4	4	3	2	3	5	4	4	4
Kashiwa Reysol	8	11	10	8	5	4	6	8	7	6	5	6	5	4	6	7	5
Omiya Ardija	8	7	7	9	10	11	10	11	10	10	9	9	8	7	7	5	6
Yokohama F. Marinos	1	1	1	1	3	5	3	5	5	7	7	4	6	6	5	6	7
Sagan Tosu	6	6	5	5	4	3	5	4	3	3	6	7	7	8	8	8	8
FC Tokyo	10	10	11	12	16	12	11	12	12	11	10	11	11	11	9	9	9
Sanfrecce Hiroshima	1	8	9	10	6	8	7	6	8	8	8	8	10	10	11	10	10
Kashima Antlers	14	9	6	7	8	9	12	10	9	9	11	10	9	9	10	11	11
Vegalta Sendai	15	18	17	14	11	10	9	9	11	12	12	12	12	12	12	12	12
Ventforet Kofu	15	16	15	16	12	13	15	13	13	13	13	13	13	13	13	13	13
Júbilo Iwata	15	13	14	13	13	15	16	16	15	15	15	15	15	16	16	16	14
Nagoya Grampus	12	16	18	17	18	18	18	18	18	18	16	17	16	15	14	14	15
Albirex Niigata	12	14	16	18	15	16	13	14	14	14	14	14	14	14	15	15	16
Shonan Bellmare	15	12	13	15	17	17	17	17	17	17	18	18	18	18	18	17	17
Avispa Fukuoka	11	15	12	11	14	13	14	15	16	16	17	16	17	17	17	18	18

Leader and qualification to 2016 J.League Championship

Source: J. League data site

=== Overall ===
Team ╲ Round	1	2	3	4	5	6	7	8	9	10	11	12	13	14	15	16	17	18	19	20	21	22	23	24	25	26	27	28	29	30	31	32	33	34
Urawa Red Diamonds	2	7	2	2	1	3	3	1	1	1	1	2	3	3	3	3	3	3	3	3	3	3	2	2	2	2	2	2	2	2	1	1	1	1
Kawasaki Frontale	5	3	1	1	2	1	1	2	2	2	2	1	1	1	1	2	2	1	1	1	1	1	1	1	1	1	1	1	1	1	2	2	2	2
Kashima Antlers	5	2	7	3	3	2	2	3	3	3	3	3	2	2	2	1	1	2	2	2	2	2	3	3	3	3	3	3	3	3	3	3	3	3
Gamba Osaka	13	12	4	7	12	8	8	8	9	11	10	8	6	8	8	6	6	6	5	6	6	7	6	5	5	5	5	4	4	4	4	5	4	4
Omiya Ardija	5	1	3	10	10	6	6	6	5	5	5	4	4	4	4	5	5	5	6	7	7	8	8	8	8	7	7	7	7	7	6	4	5	5
Kashiwa Reysol	10	18	17	17	16	14	9	7	4	4	4	5	5	5	6	7	7	7	8	8	8	5	5	7	7	6	6	6	6	5	5	6	8	8
Sanfrecce Hiroshima	13	16	16	11	7	10	5	4	7	7	6	6	8	6	5	4	4	4	4	4	4	4	4	4	4	4	4	5	5	6	7	8	6	6
Vissel Kobe	18	5	13	6	5	5	7	10	10	8	7	7	10	10	9	10	12	9	10	11	9	11	10	12	11	9	9	9	9	8	8	9	7	7
Yokohama F. Marinos	13	16	11	5	4	4	4	5	8	9	9	10	9	7	7	9	11	8	7	5	5	6	7	6	6	8	8	8	8	9	9	7	9	10
FC Tokyo	13	8	4	9	6	9	11	12	13	13	12	12	12	11	12	11	9	10	9	9	10	13	12	10	12	12	11	10	10	10	10	10	10	9
Sagan Tosu	2	8	11	13	14	16	16	16	14	14	16	16	16	17	15	13	15	13	13	12	13	10	9	11	10	11	10	11	11	11	12	12	11	11
Vegalta Sendai	5	8	4	7	13	15	15	15	16	17	14	14	13	12	10	8	10	12	12	13	12	9	11	9	9	10	12	12	12	12	11	11	12	12
Júbilo Iwata	13	8	9	12	11	7	10	9	6	6	8	9	7	9	11	12	8	11	11	10	11	12	13	13	13	13	13	13	13	13	13	13	13	13
Ventforet Kofu	1	6	8	15	15	12	12	13	11	12	13	13	14	14	14	17	17	17	17	17	17	15	15	15	15	15	15	15	14	14	14	14	14	14
Albirex Niigata	2	13	14	14	9	13	14	14	15	15	15	15	15	15	16	15	13	14	15	15	15	14	14	14	14	14	14	14	15	15	15	15	15	15
Nagoya Grampus	5	4	9	4	8	11	13	11	12	10	11	11	11	13	13	14	14	15	16	16	16	17	16	16	16	16	16	16	16	16	16	16	16	16
Shonan Bellmare	10	14	15	16	17	18	18	18	18	16	17	18	18	16	17	16	16	16	14	14	14	16	17	17	17	17	17	17	18	17	17	17	17	17
Avispa Fukuoka	10	15	18	18	18	17	17	17	17	18	18	17	17	18	18	18	18	18	18	18	18	18	18	18	18	18	18	18	17	18	18	18	18	18

Leader, qualification to 2016 J.League Championship Final and 2017 AFC Champions League group stage
Qualification to 2016 J.League Championship 1st Round and 2017 AFC Champions League group stage
Qualification to 2017 AFC Champions League qualifying play-off
Relegation to 2017 J2 League

Source: J. League data site
Notes:
1. Two games for Matchday 7 (Avispa Fukuoka vs. Nagoya Grampus and Sagan Tosu vs. Vissel Kobe), scheduled on 16 April 2016, were affected by the series of earthquakes in Kumamoto prefecture, and thus postponed and rescheduled on 2 June 2016. Results of these matches were included in Matchday 15 ranking.
2. Matchday 10 results for 2016 AFC Champions League Participants (FC Tokyo vs. Sanfrecce Hiroshima; Gamba Osaka vs. Urawa Red Diamonds), held on 15 June 2016, were included in Matchday 16 ranking.
3. Matchday 13 results for 2016 AFC Champions League Knockout Stage Participants (Urawa Red Diamonds vs. FC Tokyo), held on 22 June 2016, were included in Matchday 17 ranking.

== Championship stage ==
Meiji Yasuda 2016 J.League Championship (明治安田生命 2016 Jリーグチャンピオンシップ)
The Championship stage consisted of a knockout tournament involving the champions of the First and Second stages, and any team that finishes in the top 3 of the overall table. The team with the best aggregate record earned a bye to the final. The remaining teams playoff for the other spot in the final.

Semifinal			Final
			1	Urawa Red Diamonds	1	1	2
2	Kawasaki Frontale	0	3	Kashima Antlers	0	2	2
3	Kashima Antlers	1

23 November 2016
14:00

Kawasaki Frontale	0–1	Kashima Antlers
	Report	Kanazaki 50'

Todoroki Athletics Stadium, Kawasaki
Attendance: 24,209
Referee: Shinji Murakami

29 November 2016
19:25

Kashima Antlers	0–1	Urawa Red Diamonds
	Report	Abe 57' (pen.)

Kashima Soccer Stadium, Kashima
Attendance: 23,074
Referee: Masaaki Toma

3 December 2016
19:30

Urawa Red Diamonds	1–2	Kashima Antlers
Koroki 7'	Report	Kanazaki 40', 79' (pen.)

Saitama Stadium 2002, Midori-ku, Saitama
Attendance: 59,837
Referee: Ryuji Sato

2–2 on aggregate. Kashima Antlers won on away goals.

== Results ==
=== First stage ===
Home \ Away	ALB	ANT	ARD	AVI	BEL	FMA	FRO	GAM	GRA	JÚB	RED	REY	SAG	SFR	TOK	VEG	VEN	VIS
Albirex Niigata			1–0			1–2	0–0	0–0		1–2		2–2	1–0				2–2	
Kashima Antlers	2–1			2–0		1–0						0–2	1–0	4–1	2–0		4–0	
Omiya Ardija		0–0				1–1				1–1	0–1	2–0		1–5			1–1	2–2
Avispa Fukuoka	0–1		1–2		1–0	1–1	2–2	0–1	0–0					0–4				
Shonan Bellmare	1–2	0–3	0–1						2–1	1–0	0–2				0–1	0–1		1–2
Yokohama F. Marinos					0–1		0–2				0–0	3–0	2–1	1–2	0–1	0–1	2–2	
Kawasaki Frontale		1–1	2–0		4–4				3–2	1–0	0–1		1–0			1–1		3–1
Gamba Osaka		0–1	2–1		3–3	1–2	0–1		3–3	2–1	1–0	0–1						
Nagoya Grampus	2–1	2–3	1–2			3–1						1–1	0–1	1–1		2–1		0–1
Júbilo Iwata		1–1		2–2		1–5			0–1					1–0	0–0	3–0	3–1	
Urawa Red Diamonds	0–0	0–2		2–0					4–1	1–2					3–2	3–1	2–1	3–1
Kashiwa Reysol				3–2	1–1		1–3			2–2	1–2				1–0	0–2		2–0
Sagan Tosu			0–1	2–1	0–1			2–1		0–1	0–0	1–1					1–1	0–0
Sanfrecce Hiroshima	1–0				2–2		0–1	1–3			4–2	0–0	3–0			3–0		
FC Tokyo	1–1		0–1	0–1			2–4	1–0	3–2				0–0	1–1				1–0
Vegalta Sendai	4–2	1–0	0–1	2–0				1–3					0–2		1–2		2–1	
Ventforet Kofu				1–0	3–1		0–4	0–1	2–2			0–2		0–3	1–1			
Vissel Kobe	6–3	1–2		0–0		0–1		2–1		4–1				1–1		2–2	0–2	

Updated to match(es) played on 25 June 2016. Source: J. League Data
Legend: Blue = home team win; Yellow = draw; Red = away team win.

=== Second stage ===
Home \ Away	ALB	ANT	ARD	AVI	BEL	FMA	FRO	GAM	GRA	JÚB	RED	REY	SAG	SFR	TOK	VEG	VEN	VIS
Albirex Niigata		0–2		3–0	0–1				0–1		1–2			0–1	0–1	1–2		1–0
Kashima Antlers			1–3		1–0		0–1	1–3	3–0	3–0	1–2					0–1		0–1
Omiya Ardija	1–2			1–0	3–2		3–2	0–0	1–0				1–1		0–1	2–1		
Avispa Fukuoka		1–2								2–3	1–2	0–4	2–3		2–1	1–1	1–2	1–4
Shonan Bellmare				0–2		0–3	2–3	1–2				0–0	0–2	1–2			1–0	
Yokohama F. Marinos	3–1	2–2	1–1	3–0				2–2	0–0	1–1								3–2
Kawasaki Frontale	3–2			3–1		3–2		2–3				2–5		2–0	1–0		4–0	
Gamba Osaka	3–1			0–0									2–1	1–0	3–3	3–1	2–1	0–1
Nagoya Grampus				5–0	1–3		0–3	1–3		1–1	0–2				1–1		1–3	
Júbilo Iwata	1–2		1–1		0–0		1–1	0–2			0–1	1–2	1–1					3–4
Urawa Red Diamonds			2–2		4–1	1–1	1–2	4–0				2–0	2–0	3–0				
Kashiwa Reysol	1–0	2–0	1–2			1–2		3–2	3–1				2–3	3–3			1–0	
Sagan Tosu	1–0	1–0				2–2	1–0		0–0					2–3	3–2	2–3		
Sanfrecce Hiroshima		2–4	0–1	4–1		2–2			2–0	3–0					0–1		0–1	2–0
FC Tokyo		2–1			3–0	1–0				3–2	1–3	0–1				1–0	1–0	
Vegalta Sendai					1–0	0–1	0–3		1–2	0–1	0–1	4–2		0–2				3–0
Ventforet Kofu	1–0	3–3	2–2			0–4				0–0	0–2		0–1			1–1		0–3
Vissel Kobe			1–0		2–0		3–0		3–0		2–1	1–1	2–2		4–1			

Updated to match(es) played on 3 November 2016. Source: J. League Data
Legend: Blue = home team win; Yellow = draw; Red = away team win.

== Top scorers ==
Rank	Scorer	Club	Goals
1	(Brazil) Leandro	Vissel Kobe	19
1	(Nigeria) Peter Utaka	Sanfrecce Hiroshima	19
3	(Brazil) Cristiano	Ventforet Kofu / Kashiwa Reysol	16
4	(Japan) Yoshito Ōkubo	Kawasaki Frontale	15
4	(Japan) Yu Kobayashi	Kawasaki Frontale	15
6	(England) Jay Bothroyd	Júbilo Iwata	14
6	(Japan) Shinzo Koroki	Urawa Red Diamonds	14
8	(Japan) Yohei Toyoda	Sagan Tosu	13
9	(Brazil) Diego Oliveira	Kashiwa Reysol	12
9	(Japan) Kazuma Watanabe	Vissel Kobe	12
9	(Japan) Yuki Muto	Urawa Red Diamonds	12

Updated to games played on 3 November 2016

Source: J. League data site

== Awards ==
=== Individual ===
Award	Recipient	Club
Most Valuable Player	(Japan) Kengo Nakamura	Kawasaki Frontale
Rookie of the Year	(Japan) Yosuke Ideguchi	Gamba Osaka
Top Scorer	(Brazil) Leandro (Nigeria) Peter Utaka	Vissel Kobe; Sanfrecce Hiroshima

=== Best Eleven ===
Position	Footballer	Club	Nationality
GK	Shusaku Nishikawa	Urawa Red Diamonds	Japan
DF	Gen Shoji	Kashima Antlers	Japan
DF	Masato Morishige	FC Tokyo	Japan
DF	Tomoaki Makino	Urawa Red Diamonds	Japan
DF	Tsukasa Shiotani	Sanfrecce Hiroshima	Japan
MF	Kengo Nakamura	Kawasaki Frontale	Japan
MF	Manabu Saitō	Yokohama F. Marinos	Japan
MF	Yōsuke Kashiwagi	Urawa Red Diamonds	Japan
MF	Yuki Abe	Urawa Red Diamonds	Japan
FW	Leandro	Vissel Kobe	Brazil
FW	Yu Kobayashi	Kawasaki Frontale	Japan

== Attendances ==
These are the attendance records of each of the teams at the end of the home and away season. The table does not include the Championship stages attendances.

Pos	Team	Total	High	Low	Average	Change
1	Urawa Red Diamonds	627,898	56,841	22,766	36,935	+4.0%
2	Gamba Osaka	430,806	34,231	13,731	25,342	+58.4%
3	FC Tokyo	408,623	37,805	11,488	24,037	−16.5%
4	Yokohama F. Marinos	408,072	46,413	7,033	24,004	−0.9%
5	Kawasaki Frontale	376,305	26,612	14,432	22,136	+5.4%
6	Albirex Niigata	327,923	29,692	14,627	21,181	−9.7%
7	Kashima Antlers	360,076	31,636	6,696	19,103	+16.3%
8	Nagoya Grampus	301,396	30,282	7,980	17,729	+9.2%
9	Vissel Kobe	289,310	25,722	11,212	17,018	+4.6%
10	Vegalta Sendai	262,937	19,315	12,504	15,467	+12.2%
11	Sanfrecce Hiroshima	262,888	25,845	8,602	15,464	−5.6%
12	Júbilo Iwata	248,381	24,896	10,416	14,611	+45.5%^{†}
13	Avispa Fukuoka	218,576	19,370	5,870	12,857	+47.2%^{†}
14	Sagan Tosu	214,814	20,219	6,499	12,636	−6.1%
15	Omiya Ardija	200,834	13,880	9,480	11,814	+24.5%^{†}
16	Shonan Bellmare	196,012	14,419	8,052	11,530	−5.6%
17	Ventforet Kofu	184,161	15,508	7,011	10,833	−4.1%
18	Kashiwa Reysol	182,374	13,977	7,090	10,728	−1.7%
	League total	5,498,222	56,841	5,870	17,968	+1.0%

Updated to games played on 3 November 2016
Source: J. League Data
Notes:
^{†} Team played previous season in J2.
