= Daniel Baianinho =

Brazilian footballer

Personal information
- Full name: Daniel Gonçalves Batista
- Date of birth: 5 September 1999 (age 27)
- Place of birth: Amarante, Brazil
- Height: 1.65 m (5 ft 5 in)
- Position: Forward

Team information
- Current team: Floresta (on loan from Inter de Lages)
- Number: 7

Youth career
- Brusque
- 2017–2019: → Joinville (loan)

Senior career*
Years	Team	Apps	(Gls)
2016–2021	Brusque	12	(0)
2019	→ Joinville (loan)	13	(0)
2020	→ Inter de Lages (loan)	8	(2)
2021	→ Carlos Renaux (loan)	3	(0)
2021	→ Juventude Samas (loan)	11	(3)
2021	A&N		
2022	Liria Prizren		
2022–	Inter de Lages	20	(1)
2023	→ Caldense (loan)	10	(1)
2024	→ Capivariano (loan)	3	(1)
2024	→ Cianorte (loan)	16	(0)
2025	→ Capivariano (loan)	17	(3)
2025	→ CSA (loan)	14	(1)
2026–	→ Capivariano (loan)	8	(2)
2026–	→ Ponte Preta (loan)	15	(1)
2026–	→ Floresta (loan)	4	(0)
- * Club domestic league appearances and goals as of 26 September 2026

Daniel Gonçalves Batista (born 5 September 1999), known as Daniel Baianinho or just Baianinho, is a Brazilian footballer who plays as a forward for Floresta, on loan from Inter de Lages.

== Career ==
Born in Amarante, Piauí, he began playing em Cristalina - Goiás and received the nickname of Baianinho due to his strong accent. He played for the youth sides of Brusque, making his first team debut in 2016. In the following year, he moved on loan to Joinville, initially for the under-20 team.

After leaving JEC in August 2019, Baianinho returned to Brusque but subsequently served another loans at Inter de Lages, Carlos Renaux and Juventude Samas. On 11 August 2021, he moved abroad and joined KF A&N in Kosovo.

On 4 June 2022, after a short period at KF Liria Prizren, Baianinho returned to Inter de Lages, now in a permanent deal. In November, he was presented at Caldense on loan.

During the following years, Baianinho served loans at Capivariano on three different occasions, Cianorte and CSA.

== Career statistics ==
As of 20 January 2026

Club	Season	League			State League		Cup		Continental		Other		Total	
Club	Season	Division	Apps	Goals	Apps	Goals	Apps	Goals	Apps	Goals	Apps	Goals	Apps	Goals
Brusque	2016	Série D	2	0	—		—		—		—		2	0
Brusque	2017	Série D	1	0	1	0	—		—		—		2	0
Brusque	2019	Série D	—		—		—		—		5 (Note: Appearance(s) in Copa Santa Catarina)	0	5	0
Brusque	2020	Série C	3	0	5	0	1	0	—		—		9	0
Brusque	Total		6	0	6	0	1	0	—		5	0	18	0
Joinville (loan)	2019	Série D	1	0	12	0	1	0	—		—		14	0
Inter de Lages (loan)	2020	Catarinense Série B	—		8	2	—		—		—		8	2
Carlos Renaux (loan)	2020	Catarinense Série C	—		3	0	—		—		—		3	0
Juventude Samas (loan)	2021	Série D	2	0	9	0	1	0	—		—		12	0
Inter de Lages	2022	Catarinense Série B	—		9	0	—		—		—		9	0
Inter de Lages	2023	Catarinense Série B	—		11	1	—		—		8	2	19	3
Inter de Lages	2024	Catarinense	—		10	0	—		—		—		10	0
Inter de Lages	Total		—		30	1	—		—		8	2	38	3
Caldense (loan)	2023	Mineiro	—		10	1	1	0	—		—		11	1
Capivariano (loan)	2024	Paulista A2	—		3	1	—		—		—		3	1
Cianorte (loan)	2024	Série D	16	0	—		—		—		—		16	0
Capivariano (loan)	2025	Paulista A2	—		17	3	—		—		—		17	3
CSA (loan)	2025	Série C	14	1	—		4	0	—		3 (Note: Appearance(s) in Copa do Nordeste)	0	21	1
Capivariano (loan)	2026	Paulista	—		3	2	—		—		—		3	2
Career total			39	1	100	10	8	0	0	0	16	2	163	13
