= Neto Costa =

Brazilian footballer

Personal information
- Full name: Arnaldo Francisco da Costa Neto
- Date of birth: 12 January 1997 (age 29)
- Place of birth: São José dos Ramos, Brazil
- Height: 1.84 m (6 ft 0 in)
- Position: Forward

Team information
- Current team: Guarani (loan)
- Number: 97

Youth career
- Cerâmica
- 2015–2016: CSP
- 2016–2017: Capivariano

Senior career*
Years	Team	Apps	(Gls)
2015–2016	CSP	7	(1)
2017–2024	Capivariano	35	(13)
2018	→ Cianorte (loan)	13	(4)
2018	→ Ponte Preta (loan)	7	(0)
2019	→ Santa Cruz (loan)	9	(2)
2019–2020	→ Oliveirense (loan)	14	(1)
2020	→ FC Cascavel (loan)	10	(0)
2021	→ Boa Esporte (loan)	13	(0)
2022	→ Caldense (loan)	15	(2)
2022	→ Manaus (loan)	9	(0)
2023	→ Patrocinense (loan)	11	(5)
2023	→ Operário Ferroviário (loan)	6	(0)
2024–	Capivariano	15	(6)
2024–2025	→ Athletic-MG (loan)	58	(10)
2026	→ São Bernardo (loan)	2	(0)
2026–	→ Guarani (loan)	3	(0)
- * Club domestic league appearances and goals as of 10 November 2026

Arnaldo Francisco da Costa Neto (born 12 January 1997), known as Neto Costa, is a Brazilian professional footballer who plays as a forward for Guarani, on loan from Capivariano.

== Career ==
Born in São José dos Ramos, Paraíba, Neto Costa played for Cerâmica and CSP as a youth before making his senior debut with the latter. He moved to Capivariano in 2016, initially for the under-20 team.

In June 2018, after a period at Cianorte, Neto Costa moved to Ponte Preta. After being rarely used, he signed for Santa Cruz on 19 December.

On 31 August 2019, Neto Costa moved abroad for the first time in his career, joining Oliveirense in the Portuguese LigaPro. On 28 August of the following year, he returned to his home country to sign for FC Cascavel.

Back at Capivariano for the 2021 Campeonato Paulista Série A3, Neto Costa was announced at Boa Esporte on 18 June of that year. On 26 November, he agreed to a deal with Caldense, but moved to Manaus on 7 April 2022.

On 14 December 2022, Patrocinense announced the signing of Neto Costa for the upcoming campaign. The following 12 April, after being the club's top scorer in the 2023 Campeonato Mineiro, he moved to Operário Ferroviário.

Back to Capivariano for the 2024 Campeonato Paulista Série A2, Neto Costa signed for Athletic-MG on 10 April of that year. On 6 January 2025, after helping the club to achieve a first-ever promotion to the Série B, he signed a new one-year contract.

== Career statistics ==
As of 29 May 2025

Club	Season	League			State League		Cup		Continental		Other		Total	
Club	Season	Division	Apps	Goals	Apps	Goals	Apps	Goals	Apps	Goals	Apps	Goals	Apps	Goals
CSP	2015	Paraibano	—		7	1	—		—		—		7	1
Capivariano	2017	Paulista A2	—		5	2	—		—		—		5	2
Capivariano	2021	Paulista A3	—		15	5	—		—		—		15	5
Capivariano	2024	Paulista Série A2	—		15	6	—		—		—		15	6
Capivariano	Total		—		35	13	—		—		—		35	13
Cianorte (loan)	2018	Série D	3	1	10	3	2	0	—		—		15	4
Ponte Preta (loan)	2018	Série B	7	0	—		—		—		—		7	0
Santa Cruz (loan)	2019	Série C	3	1	6	1	0	0	—		2 (Note: Appearance(s) in Copa do Nordeste)	0	11	2
Oliveirense (loan)	2019–20	LigaPro	14	1	—		1	0	—		—		15	1
FC Cascavel (loan)	2020	Série D	10	0	—		—		—		—		10	0
Boa Esporte (loan)	2021	Série D	13	0	—		—		—		—		13	0
Caldense (loan)	2022	Série D	—		15	2	—		—		—		15	2
Manaus (loan)	2022	Série C	9	0	—		—		—		—		9	0
Patrocinense (loan)	2023	Série D	—		11	5	—		—		—		11	5
Operário Ferroviário (loan)	2023	Série C	6	0	—		—		—		—		6	0
Athletic-MG	2024	Série C	17	3	—		—		—		—		17	3
Athletic-MG	2025	Série B	7	3	8	0	2	0	—		—		17	3
Athletic-MG	Total		24	6	8	0	2	0	—		—		34	6
Career total			89	9	77	24	5	0	0	0	2	0	173	33
