= Vinicius Guedes =

Brazilian footballer

Personal information
- Full name: Vinicius Guedes
- Date of birth: 9 August 1999 (age 27)
- Place of birth: Tapera, Brazil
- Height: 1.71 m (5 ft 7 in)
- Position: Midfielder

Team information
- Current team: Capivariano
- Number: 16

Youth career
- 2009–2015: Internacional
- 2016–2020: Chapecoense

Senior career*
Years	Team	Apps	(Gls)
2020–2022	Chapecoense	25	(1)
2021	→ Operário Ferroviário (loan)	8	(0)
2023	Caxias	13	(0)
2023–2024	América de Natal	15	(1)
2025	Caxias	33	(0)
2026–	Capivariano	7	(0)
- * Club domestic league appearances and goals as of 22:09, 28 October 2025 (UTC)

Vinicius Guedes (born 9 August 1999), commonly known as Guedes, is a Brazilian footballer who plays as a midfielder for Capivariano.

== Club career ==
Guedes was born in Tapera, Rio Grande do Sul, and joined Chapecoense's youth setup in 2016, after representing Internacional. Promoted to the first team for the 2020 season, he made his senior debut on 8 March of that year; after starting in a 3–0 Campeonato Catarinense home win against Joinville, he scored the club's third goal.

On 19 June 2020, Guedes renewed his contract with Chape until the end of 2022. He contributed with seven league appearances in the season, as his club achieved promotion to the Série A as champions.

Guedes made his debut in the top tier of Brazilian football on 13 June 2021, starting in a 0–0 home draw against Ceará.

== Career statistics ==
As of 26 October 2021

Club	Season	League			State League		Cup		Continental		Other		Total	
Club	Season	Division	Apps	Goals	Apps	Goals	Apps	Goals	Apps	Goals	Apps	Goals	Apps	Goals
Chapecoense	2020	Série B	7	0	5	1	0	0	—		—		12	1
Chapecoense	2021	Série A	4	0	0	0	0	0	—		—		4	0
Chapecoense	Total		11	0	5	1	0	0	—		—		16	1
Operário Ferroviário (loan)	2021	Série B	2	0	—		—		—		—		2	0
Career total			13	0	5	1	0	0	0	0	0	0	18	1

== Honours ==
Chapecoense

- Campeonato Catarinense: 2020
- Campeonato Brasileiro Série B: 2020

América-RN

- Campeonato Potiguar: 2023
