= Leonan =

Leonan may refer to:

- Leonan (footballer, born 1995), full name Leonan José Valandro Gomes, Brazilian football left-back
- Leonan (footballer, born 2000), full name Leonan Santos de Abreu, Brazilian football centre-back
