= Ricardo Cerqueira =

Brazilian footballer

Personal information
- Full name: José Ricardo Batista Cerqueira
- Date of birth: 29 December 2002 (age 23)
- Place of birth: Santanópolis, Brazil
- Height: 1.84 m (6 ft 0 in)
- Position: Defender

Team information
- Current team: Capivariano
- Number: 13

Youth career
- 2019–2020: Sergipe
- 2021–2023: Capivariano
- 2022–2023: → Cuiabá (loan)

Senior career*
Years	Team	Apps	(Gls)
2021–2023	Capivariano	19	(1)
2022–2023	→ Cuiabá (loan)	1	(0)
2023–2024	Cuiabá	8	(0)
2024	→ Bangu (loan)	4	(0)
2024	→ Capivariano (loan)	8	(0)
2025	Capivariano	18	(0)
2025	São José-RS	4	(0)
2025	Boa Esporte	6	(0)
2026–	Capivariano	3	(0)
2026	Itabaiana	17	(0)
- * Club domestic league appearances and goals as of 11 November 2026

José Ricardo Batista Cerqueira (born 29 December 2001), known as Ricardo Cerqueira or just Ricardo, is a Brazilian footballer who plays as either a central defender or a right back for Capivariano.

== Club career ==
=== Capivariano ===
Born in Santanópolis, Bahia, Ricardo played for the youth sides of Sergipe and Capivariano, being promoted to the first team of the latter in January 2021. He made his senior debut on 14 March, coming on as a late substitute in a 2–0 Campeonato Paulista Série A3 away loss against Bandeirante; it was his only appearance of the season, as he subsequently returned to the under-20 team.

After playing in the 2022 Copa São Paulo de Futebol Júnior with the under-20s, Ricardo became a starter for Capivariano in the 2022 Paulista Série A3. He scored his first senior goal on 5 March of that year, scoring the winner in a 2–1 home success over Desportivo Brasil but being also sent off late in the match.

=== Cuiabá ===
In July 2022, Ricardo moved to Cuiabá and was initially assigned to the under-23 team for the year's Campeonato Brasileiro de Aspirantes. He then appeared for the senior side on 3 September, in a 3–0 loss against Mixto for the year's Copa FMF, as the club was also utilizing the under-23 team in the competition.

On 20 January 2023, after contributing with the best campaign of the history of the under-20 side of Cuiabá in the Copa São Paulo, Ricardo signed a permanent contract with the club until the end of 2027. Seven days later, he was definitely promoted to the first team.

Ricardo made his first team debut for Dourado on 29 January 2023, replacing Pablo Ceppelini at half-time in a 3–0 Campeonato Mato-Grossense away win over Academia. His Série A debut occurred on 27 May, as he replaced Raniele late into a 1–1 home draw against Coritiba.

== Career statistics ==
As of 15 April 2025

Club	Season	League			State League		Cup		Continental		Other		Total	
Club	Season	Division	Apps	Goals	Apps	Goals	Apps	Goals	Apps	Goals	Apps	Goals	Apps	Goals
Capivariano	2021	Paulista A3	—		1	0	—		—		—		1	0
Capivariano	2022	Paulista A3	—		18	1	—		—		—		18	1
Capivariano	Total		—		19	1	—		—		—		19	1
Cuiabá	2022	Série A	0	0	—		—		—		1 (Note: Appearance(s) in Copa FMF)	0	1	0
Cuiabá	2023	Série A	1	0	7	0	0	0	—		4 (Note: One appearance in Copa Verde, three appearances in Copa FMF)	0	12	0
Cuiabá	Total		1	0	7	0	0	0	—		5	0	13	0
Bangu	2024	Carioca	—		4	0	—		—		—		4	0
Capivariano	2024	Paulista A2	—		8	0	—		—		7 (Note: Appearance(s) in Copa Paulista)	0	15	0
Capivariano	2025	Paulista A2	—		18	0	—		—		—		18	0
Capivariano	Total		—		26	0	—		—		7	0	33	0
Career total			1	0	56	1	0	0	0	0	12	0	69	1

== Honours ==
Cuiabá

- Campeonato Brasileiro de Aspirantes: 2022
- Campeonato Mato-Grossense: 2023

Capivariano

- Campeonato Paulista Série A2: 2025
