= Marcos Martins =

Brazilian footballer

Personal information
- Full name: Marcos Martins dos Anjos
- Date of birth: July 24, 1989 (age 37)
- Place of birth: Seabra/BA, Brazil
- Height: 1.70 m (5 ft 7 in)
- Position: Right back

Team information
- Current team: Botafogo-PB

Youth career
- 2005: Real Salvador
- 2006–2008: Cruzeiro
- 2008: → Ipatinga (loan)

Senior career*
| Years | Team | Apps | (Gls) |
| 2009–2014 | Cruzeiro | 0 | (0) |
| 2009 | → Itaúna (loan) | 0 | (0) |
| 2009 | → Bahia (loan) | 24 | (2) |
| 2010 | → Avaí (loan) | 17 | (0) |
| 2011 | → Bahia (loan) | 27 | (0) |
| 2012 | → Atlético Goianiense (loan) | 19 | (1) |
| 2013 | → Vitória (loan) | 0 | (0) |
| 2013–2014 | → Ceará (loan) | 48 | (1) |
| 2015–2017 | CRB | 53 | (1) |
| 2018 | Botafogo-SP | 13 | (0) |
| 2019 | Santa Cruz | 12 | (0) |
| 2019–2020 | São Bento | 63 | (2) |
| 2020– | Botafogo-PB | 10 | (0) |

International career
| 2008 | Brazil U-20 | | |
- * Club domestic league appearances and goals as of 20:45, 5 December 2019 (UTC)

Marcos Martins dos Anjos, sometimes known as Marcos (Souto Soares, July 24, 1989), is a Brazilian footballer who acts as right back for Botafogo-PB.

== Career ==
Marcos Martins was revealed by the basic categories of Cruzeiro, however, he soon borrowed the basic categories of Ipatinga where he disputed the Campeonato Brasileiro Sub-20 2008.

In the year 2009 was loaned again, this time for Itaúna, where the team competed in the Campeonato Mineiro Módulo II. That same year, he went to the Bahia where he was cast in the Brazilian Championship team in Serie B. Initially, the team was hired to work in the Bahia-based divisions, but with the sudden departure of an injury to Patrick and Dede, was promoted to principal owner of the team in a match against Ceará Sporting Club, and did not disappoint. Charmed the crowd at Pituaçu and became the absolute owner of Bahia.

In 2010 it was confirmed to join the cast of Cruzeiro, but was not seized at the time and training remained separate from the main group. Later that year, was loaned to Avaí.

=== Career statistics ===
(Correct as of June 26, 2011)

Appearances and goals by club, season and competition
| Club | Season | State League | | League | | Copa do Brasil | | Copa Sudamericana | | Total | |
| Club | Season | Apps | Goals | Apps | Goals | Apps | Goals | Apps | Goals | Apps | Goals |
|---|---|---|---|---|---|---|---|---|---|---|---|
| Bahia (loan) | 2011 | — | | 24 | 2 | — | | — | | 24 | 2 |
| Cruzeiro | 2010 | 4 | 0 | — | | — | | — | | 4 | 0 |
| Avaí (loan) | 2010 | — | | 17 | 0 | — | | 4 | 0 | 21 | 0 |
| Bahia (loan) | 2011 | — | | 3 | 0 | 2 | 0 | — | | 5 | 0 |
| Total | | 4 | 0 | 44 | 2 | 2 | 0 | 4 | 0 | 54 | 2 |

== Honours ==
Cruzeiro

- Copa São Paulo de Futebol Júnior: 2007

Ipatinga

- Campeonato Mineiro - Módulo II: 2009

Avaí

- Campeonato Catarinense: 2010

Vitória

- Campeonato Baiano: 2013

Ceará

- Campeonato Cearense: 2014

CRB

- Campeonato Alagoano: 2016, 2017
