= Santanópolis =

Municipality of Bahia State, Brazil

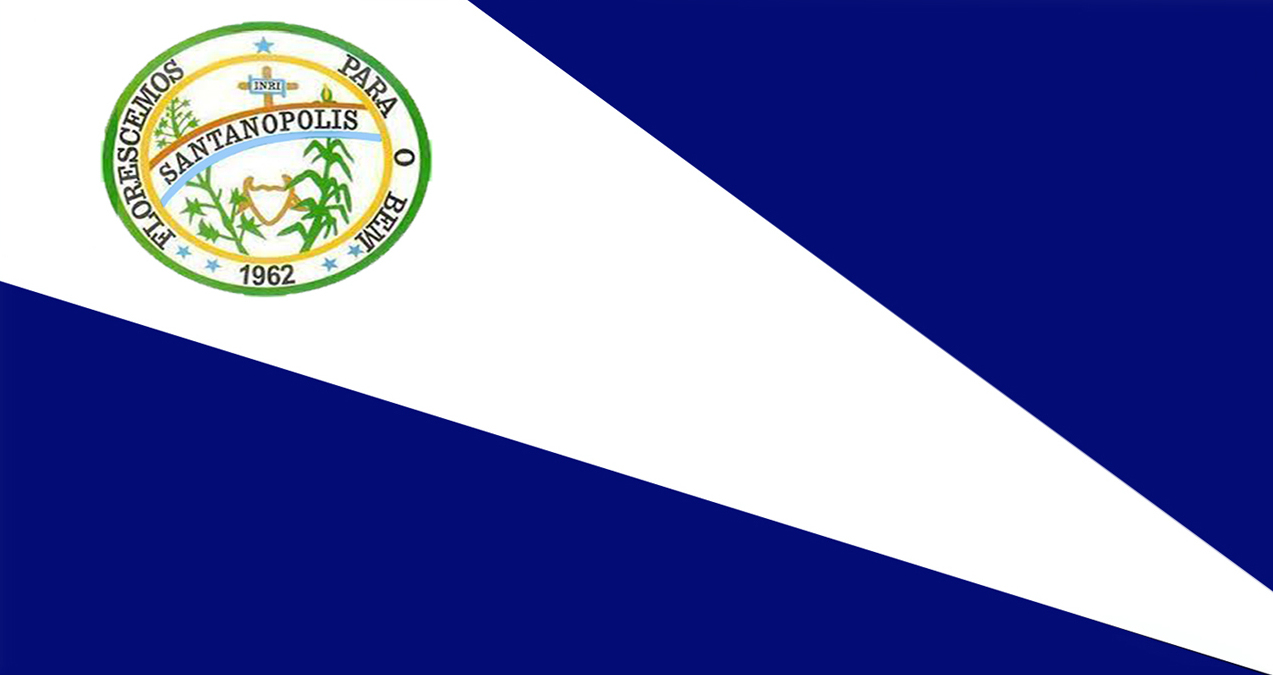
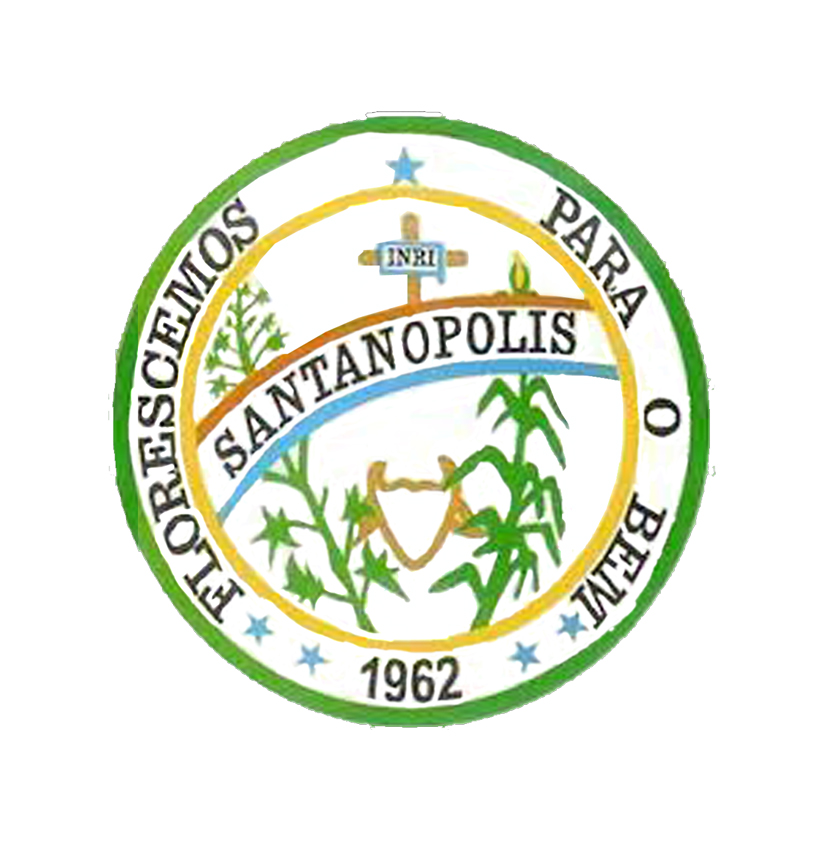
- Flag Seal

- Coordinates: 12°01′01″S 38°52′01″W
- Region: Nordeste
- State: Bahia
- Founded: 14 December 1961
- Elevation: 227 m (745 ft)

Population (2020)
  - Total: 8,966
- Time zone: UTC−3 (BRT)
- Postal code: 2928307

Santanópolis is a municipality in the state of Bahia in the North-East region of Brazil.

== See also ==
- List of municipalities in Bahia
