= Jô (footballer, born 1989) =

Brazilian footballer

Personal information
- Full name: Jonathan Oliveira da Silva
- Date of birth: 30 November 1989 (age 36)
- Place of birth: Porto Alegre, Brazil
- Height: 1.69 m (5 ft 7 in)
- Position: Winger

Team information
- Current team: Cruzeiro-RS

Youth career
- 2009–2010: Cruzeiro-RS

Senior career*
| Years | Team | Apps | (Gls) |
| 2011 | Cruzeiro-RS | 19 | (7) |
| 2011 | Internacional | 0 | (0) |
| 2011 | Vila Nova | 8 | (0) |
| 2011 | Luverdense | 6 | (0) |
| 2012 | Cruzeiro-RS | 13 | (3) |
| 2012 | Chapecoense | 18 | (4) |
| 2013 | Cruzeiro-RS | 14 | (4) |
| 2013 | Lajeadense | 4 | (0) |
| 2014 | Paulista | 9 | (0) |
| 2014 | Paysandu | 5 | (0) |
| 2014–2017 | São José-RS | 41 | (7) |
| 2015 | → Juventude (loan) | 14 | (2) |
| 2016 | → Londrina (loan) | 31 | (3) |
| 2017 | → Fortaleza (loan) | 13 | (1) |
| 2018 | Juventude | 8 | (0) |
| 2018 | Londrina | 12 | (0) |
| 2019 | Santa Cruz | 5 | (0) |
| 2020 | Pelotas | 7 | (0) |
| 2021 | Metalist Kharkiv | 17 | (6) |
| 2022 | Joinville | 4 | (0) |
| 2022– | Cruzeiro-RS | 8 | (1) |
- * Club domestic league appearances and goals as of 18:50, 5 June 2022 (UTC)

Jonathan Oliveira da Silva (born 30 November 1989), known as Jô, is a Brazilian professional footballer who plays as a winger for Cruzeiro-RS.
