= Anderson (footballer, born March 1998) =

Brazilian footballer

Personal information
- Full name: Anderson Silva da Paixão
- Date of birth: 5 March 1998 (age 28)
- Place of birth: Ribeirão Pires, Brazil
- Height: 1.90 m (6 ft 3 in)
- Position: Goalkeeper

Team information
- Current team: Chapecoense
- Number: 98

Youth career
- Palmeiras
- 2017: → CSA (loan)

Senior career*
Years	Team	Apps	(Gls)
2018–2019	Palmeiras	0	(0)
2019	→ Santa Cruz (loan)	36	(0)
2019–2022	Athletico Paranaense	27	(0)
2020	→ Náutico (loan)	16	(0)
2021	→ Náutico (loan)	11	(0)
2023–2025	Cruzeiro	22	(0)
2025	→ Atlético Goianiense (loan)	11	(0)
2026–	Chapecoense	7	(0)

International career
2013	Brazil U15		
- * Club domestic league appearances and goals as of 17 December 2025

Anderson Silva da Paixão (born 5 March 1998), simply known as Anderson, is a Brazilian footballer who plays as a goalkeeper for Chapecoense.

== Career statistics ==
As of 20 November 2024.

Appearances and goals by club, season and competition
Club	Season	League			State League		Cup		Continental		Other		Total	
Club	Season	Division	Apps	Goals	Apps	Goals	Apps	Goals	Apps	Goals	Apps	Goals	Apps	Goals
Palmeiras	2019	Série A	0	0	—		0	0	—		—		0	0
Santa Cruz (loan)	2019	Série C	18	0	7	0	6	0	—		5 (Note: Appearances in the Copa do Nordeste)	0	36	0
Athletico Paranaense	2019	Série A	0	0	—		—		—		—		0	0
Athletico Paranaense	2020	Série A	0	0	5	0	0	0	0	0	0	0	5	0
Athletico Paranaense	2021	Série A	0	0	8	0	0	0	0	0	—		8	0
Athletico Paranaense	2022	Série A	5	0	9	0	0	0	0	0	—		14	0
Athletico Paranaense	Total		5	0	22	0	0	0	0	0	0	0	27	0
Náutico (loan)	2020	Série B	16	0	—		—		—		—		16	0
Náutico (loan)	2021	Série B	11	0	—		—		—		0	0	11	0
Cruzeiro	2023	Série A	1	0	0	0	0	0	—		—		1	0
Cruzeiro	2024	Série A	17	0	0	0	0	0	4	0	—		21	0
Cruzeiro	Total		18	0	0	0	0	0	4	0	—		22	0
Career total			68	0	29	0	6	0	4	0	5	0	112	0

== Honours ==
Athletico Paranaense

- Campeonato Paranaense: 2020
