= Elias Carioca =

Brazilian footballer (born 1999)

Personal information
- Full name: Elias Rezende de Oliveira
- Date of birth: 21 December 1999 (age 26)
- Place of birth: Nilópolis, Brazil
- Height: 1.85 m (6 ft 1 in)
- Position: Forward

Youth career
- –2018: Nova Iguaçu
- 2018–2019: Santa Cruz

Senior career*
Years	Team	Apps	(Gls)
2019	Santa Cruz	16	(3)
2020–2023	Athletico Paranaense	13	(0)
2020–2021	→ Guarani (loan)	9	(0)
2021	→ Santa Cruz (loan)	6	(0)
2023	CRAC	10	(0)
- * Club domestic league appearances and goals as of 22 July 2023

Elias Rezende de Oliveira (born 21 December 1999), known as Elias Carioca or simply Elias, is a Brazilian footballer who plays for as a forward.

== Career statistics ==
=== Club ===
As of 1 August 2020.

Club	Season	League			State league		Cup		Continental		Other		Total	
Club	Season	Division	Apps	Goals	Apps	Goals	Apps	Goals	Apps	Goals	Apps	Goals	Apps	Goals
Santa Cruz	2019	Série C	7	1	9	2	3	1	—		9 (Note: Appearances in the Copa do Nordeste)	1	28	5
Athletico Paranaense	2020	Série A	0	0	6	0	0	0	—		0	0	6	0
Athletico Paranaense	2021	Série A	0	0	1	0	0	0	—		—		1	0
Athletico Paranaense	Total		0	0	7	0	0	0	—		—		7	0
Guarani (loan)	2020	Série B	5	0	4	0	—		—		—		9	0
Career total			12	1	20	2	3	1	0	0	9	1	44	5
