= Souto Soares =

Coordinates: 12°05′20″S 41°38′16″W

- Municipality
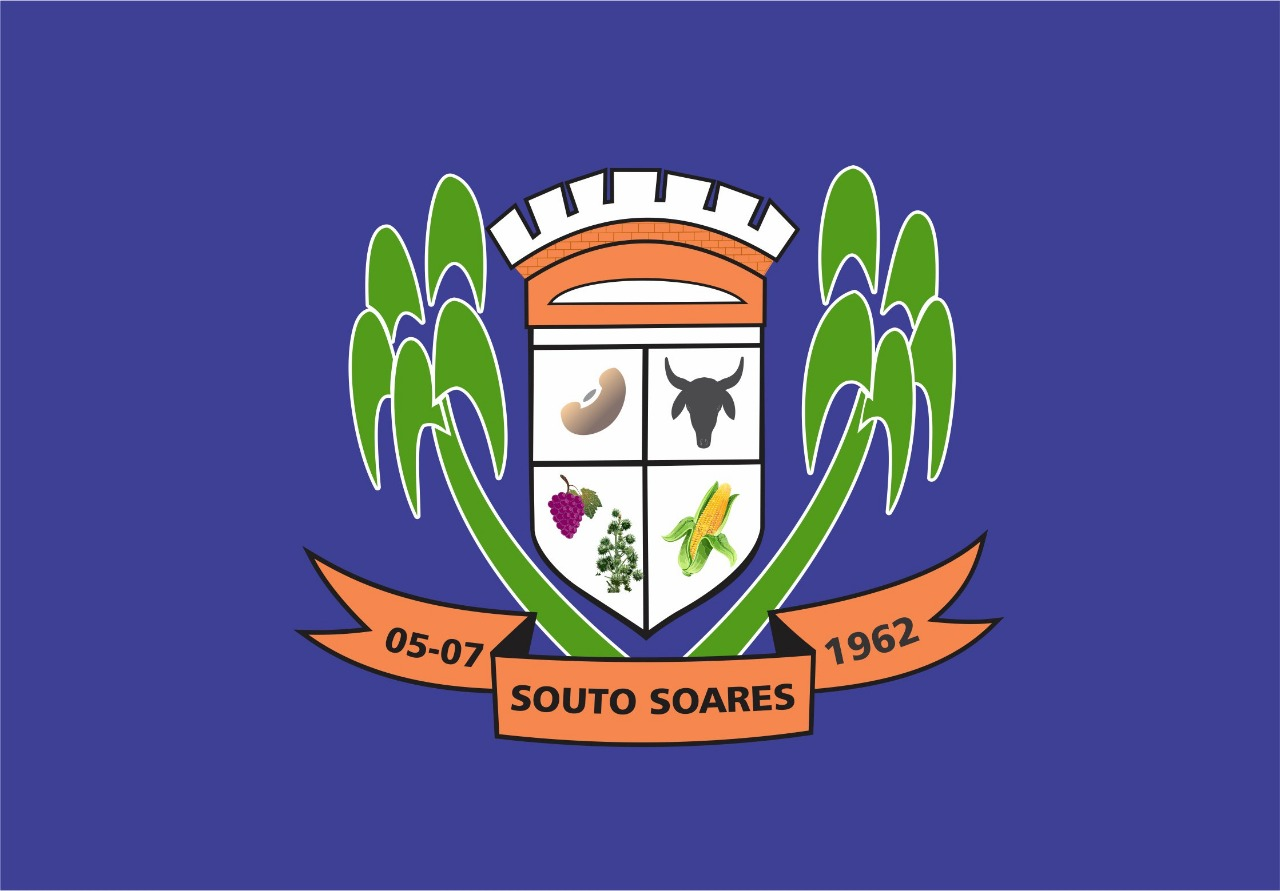
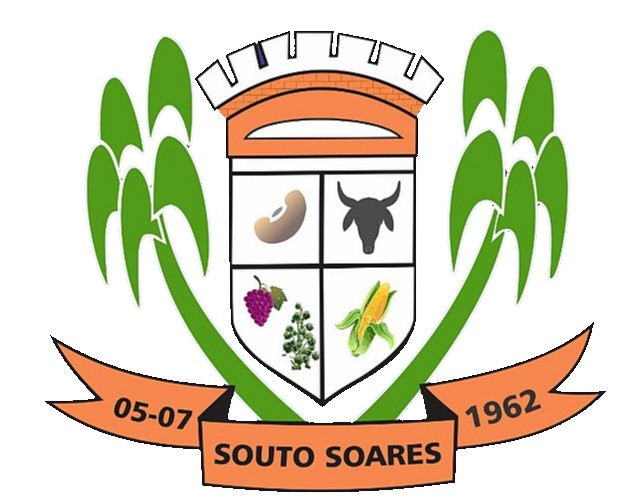
- Flag Coat of arms
- Interactive map of Souto Soares
- Country: Brazil
- Region: Nordeste
- State: Bahia

Population (2020)
  - Total: 17,050
- Time zone: UTC−3 (BRT)

Souto Soares is a municipality in the state of Bahia in the North-East region of Brazil.

== See also ==
- List of municipalities in Bahia
