= Tapera, Rio Grande do Sul =

Municipality in Rio Grande do Sul, Brazil

Coordinates: 28°37′33″S 52°52′12″W

- Municipality
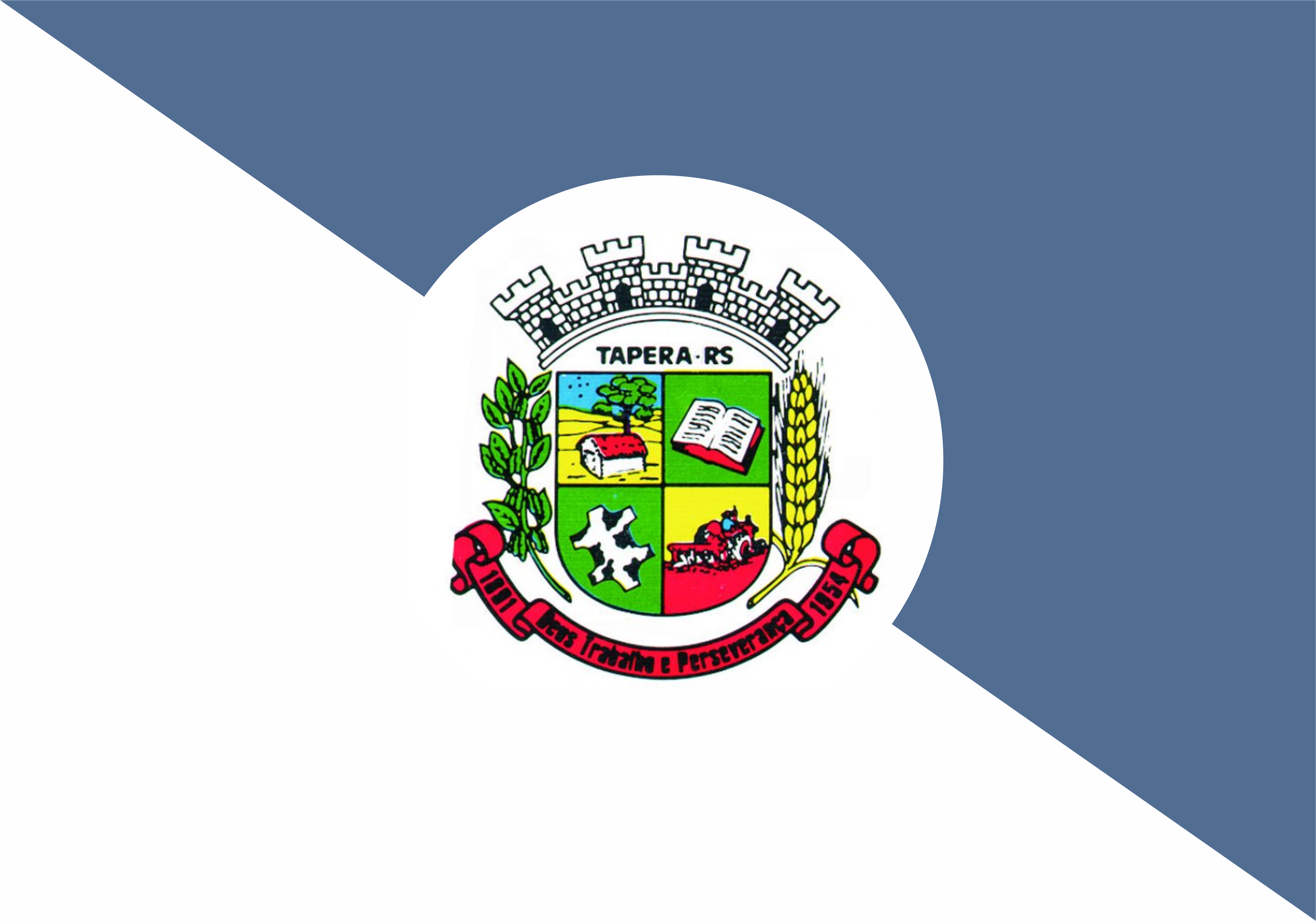
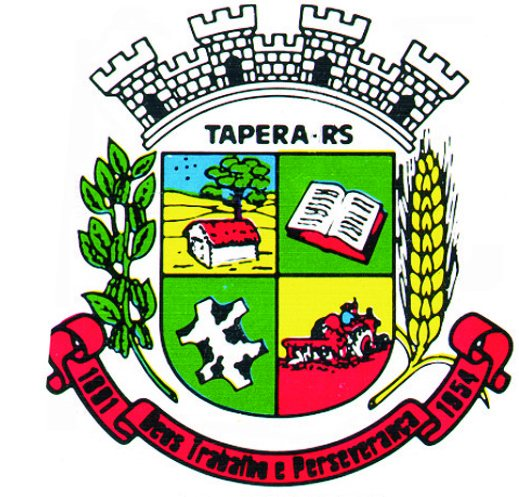
- Flag Coat of arms
- Interactive map of Tapera, Rio Grande do Sul
- Country: Brazil
- Time zone: UTC−3 (BRT)

Tapera is a municipality in the state of Rio Grande do Sul, Brazil. As of 2020, the estimated population was 10,577.

== See also ==
- List of municipalities in Rio Grande do Sul
