= São José dos Ramos =

Coordinates: 7.25083°S 35.3839°W

- Municipality
- Coat of arms
- Interactive map of São José dos Ramos
- Country: Brazil
- Region: Northeast
- State: Paraíba
- Mesoregion: Mata Paraibana

Population (2020)
  - Total: 5,998
- Time zone: UTC−3 (BRT)

São José dos Ramos is a municipality in the state of Paraíba in the Northeast Region of Brazil.

== See also ==
- List of municipalities in Paraíba
