= Capivariano Futebol Clube =

Association football club in Brazil

Capivariano
- Full name: Capivariano Futebol Clube
- Nicknames: Capi; Leão da Sorocabana (Sorocabana's Lion)
- Founded: 12 October 1918 (108 years ago)
- Ground: Arena Capivari
- Capacity: 7,314
- Owner: Osvaldo Agustinho Riccomini
- President: Jorge Pagotto
- Head coach: Elio Sizenando
- League: Campeonato Paulista
- 2025: Paulista Série A2, 1st of 16 (champions)
- Website: http://capivarianofc.com.br
Home colors	Away colors

Capivariano Futebol Clube, commonly referred to as Capivariano, is a Brazilian professional association football club based in Capivari, São Paulo. The team competes in the Campeonato Paulista, the top tier of the São Paulo state football league.

== Current squad ==
As of 10 January 2026

Note: Flags indicate national team as defined under FIFA eligibility rules; some limited exceptions apply. Players may hold more than one non-FIFA nationality.

No.	Pos.	Nation	Player
—	GK	BRA	Guilherme Nogueira
—	GK	BRA	Matheus Teixeira
—	GK	BRA	Tiago Henrique
—	DF	BRA	Lailton
—	DF	BRA	Leonan
—	DF	BRA	Lucas Dias (on loan from Figueirense)
—	DF	BRA	Octávio
—	DF	BRA	Wendel Lomar
—	DF	BRA	Diogo Mateus (on loan from Operário Ferroviário)
—	DF	BRA	Marcos Moser
—	DF	BRA	Tarcísio
—	MF	BRA	Bruno Silva
—	MF	BRA	João Victor Balão
—	MF	BRA	Ricardo Cerqueira

No.	Pos.	Nation	Player
—	MF	BRA	Tiaguinho
—	MF	BRA	Vinicius Guedes
—	MF	BRA	Carlos Eduardo
—	MF	BRA	Cassinho
—	MF	BRA	Ravanelli
—	FW	BRA	Daniel Baianinho (on loan from Inter de Lages)
—	FW	BRA	Felipe Azevedo
—	FW	BRA	Leandrinho
—	FW	BRA	Matheus Guilherme
—	FW	BRA	Mike
—	FW	BRA	Rigley
—	FW	BRA	Rodolfo
—	FW	BRA	Vinícius Popó

=== Out on loan ===
Note: Flags indicate national team as defined under FIFA eligibility rules; some limited exceptions apply. Players may hold more than one non-FIFA nationality.

No.	Pos.	Nation	Player

== History ==
The club was founded on 12 October 1918. Capivariano won the Campeonato Paulista Série A3 in 1984 and the Campeonato Paulista Série A2 in 2014. The team's main rivals are Paulínia FC and Primavera EC.

== Honours ==
- Campeonato Paulista Série A2
  - Winners (2): 2014, 2025
- Campeonato Paulista Série A3
  - Winners (2): 1984, 2023

== Stadium ==
Capivariano Futebol Clube play their home games at Arena Capivari (old Estádio Municipal Carlos Colnaghi).
