= Dudu (footballer, born 1996) =

Brazilian footballer

Personal information
- Full name: Luiz Eduardo da Silva dos Santos
- Date of birth: February 24, 1996 (age 30)
- Place of birth: Boa Vista, Roraima, Brazil
- Height: 1.72 m (5 ft 8 in)
- Position: Forward

Team information
- Current team: Uberlândia

Youth career
- 2009–2010: CADE
- 2010–2011: Benfica
- 2012: Athletico Paranaense
- 2013: Guaicurus
- 2015: Cruzeiro

Senior career*
Years	Team	Apps	(Gls)
2013–2014	Guaicurus		
2016–2018	Kashiwa Reysol	16	(2)
2018	Náutico	16	(2)
2018	Ponte Preta	2	(0)
2019	Santa Cruz	16	(3)
2019	Goiás	4	(0)
2020	CRB	11	(0)
2020	Náutico	6	(0)
2021	Sampaio Corrêa	15	(3)
2021–2022	Retrô	2	(0)
2022–2023	Taubaté	2	(0)
2023	Inhumas	6	(0)
2023–	Uberlândia	0	(0)
- * Club domestic league appearances and goals as of 1 February 2023

Luiz Eduardo da Silva dos Santos (born February 24, 1996), known as Dudu, is a Brazilian professional footballer who plays for Uberlândia as a forward.

== Career ==
Dudu joined J1 League club Kashiwa Reysol in 2016.
