= Milton Mendes =

Brazilian footballer and manager

Personal information
- Date of birth: 25 April 1965 (age 61)
- Place of birth: Içara, Brazil
- Height: 1.82 m (6 ft 0 in)
- Positions: Right back; midfielder

Team information
- Current team: Marco 09 (manager)

Senior career*
Years	Team	Apps	(Gls)
1984–1987	Vasco da Gama	6	(1)
1986	→ Criciúma (loan)	14	(0)
1987–1991	Louletano	76	(9)
1991–1992	Beira-Mar	24	(0)
1992–1993	Belenenses	8	(0)
1993–1996	União Madeira	69	(5)
1996–1997	Espinho	12	(2)
1997–1998	Camacha	10	(0)
1998–1999	São Vicente		
1999–2001	Câmara Lobos	46	(3)
2001–2002	Machico	33	(1)
Total		294	(21)

Managerial career
- 2002–2004: Machico
- 2006: Bom Sucesso Funchal
- 2007–2008: Marítimo (assistant)
- 2008–2012: Qatar SC (assistant)
- 2013: Al-Shahaniya
- 2014: Paraná
- 2014–2015: Ferroviária
- 2015: Atlético Paranaense
- 2016: Kashiwa Reysol
- 2016: Santa Cruz
- 2017: Vasco da Gama
- 2018: Sport
- 2019: Santa Cruz
- 2019: São Bento
- 2020–2021: Marítimo
- 2021: Retrô
- 2024: Carlos A. Mannucci
- 2025: Retrô
- 2026–: Marco 09
- * Club domestic league appearances and goals

Milton Mendes (born 25 April 1965) is a Brazilian football coach and a former player who played mainly as a right back. He is the manager of Portuguese Liga 3 club Marco 09.

He spent the better part of his 18-year professional career in Portugal, representing nine and amassing Primeira Liga totals of 87 games and three goals over the course of five seasons. In 2002, he became a manager.

== Playing career ==
Born in Içara, Santa Catarina, Mendes joined CR Vasco da Gama in 1984, after starting his career with Santa Catarina Clube. After a loan at Criciúma Esporte Clube in 1986, he moved abroad for the first time in his career in the 1987 summer, joining Portuguese club Louletano DC.

After featuring regularly for the Algarve team, Mendes signed for Primeira Liga side S.C. Beira-Mar in June 1991. He made his competitive debut for the latter on 24 August, starting in a 2–3 away loss against Boavista FC.

Mendes moved to C.F. Os Belenenses in 1992, also in the main division. The following year he joined fellow league team C.F. União, partnering a host of compatriots and suffering relegation in 1995.

In 1996, Mendes signed for S.C. Espinho in the top flight, and contributed with 12 appearances and two goals in his first and only season. He subsequently resumed his career in the lower leagues, representing A.D. Camacha, A.C.D. São Vicente, C.S.D. Câmara de Lobos and A.D. Machico, retiring with the latter in 2002 at the age of 37.

== Managerial career ==
The Uefa Pro Coach immediately after retiring, Mendes started working as a manager, with his last club Machico. In 2006, he was appointed at lowly F.C. do Bom Sucesso also in the island of Madeira; in the following year, he was named Sebastião Lazaroni's assistant at C.S. Marítimo.

Mendes also followed Lazaroni to Qatar, being his assistant at Qatar SC. He left the club in 2012, being subsequently in charge of Al-Shahania Sports Club in the same country.

On 13 December 2013, Mendes signed for Paraná Clube. He was sacked on 24 March 2014, and joined Associação Ferroviária de Esportes on 4 October.

On 20 April 2015, after being crowned champion of the Campeonato Paulista Série A2, Mendes was appointed manager of Clube Atlético Paranaense, replacing fired Enderson Moreira. He was fired on 28 September, after suffering four consecutive defeats.

In October 2015, Mendes signed a contract with Kashiwa Reysol of Japan's J1 League, but led the club for only three games before resigning next March for personal reasons. Later that month, Mendes was named at the helm of Santa Cruz Futebol Clube in his country's top flight, but resigned on 9 August.

On 20 March 2017, Mendes was presented at CR Vasco da Gama. He was relieved from his duties on 21 August.

On 26 September 2018, after more than one year of inactivity, Mendes was named Sport Club do Recife manager. He was not offered a new contract in December by the club's new president.

Mendes returned to Santa Cruz in May 2019. He lost his job on 9 August, when the team were second from bottom. The following month, he was hired at Campeonato Brasileiro Série B outfit Esporte Clube São Bento, but resigned from the last-placed team in November due to criminal allegations. The case against him was dropped in February 2020.

Mendes returned to Marítimo in August 2020 to lead their under-23 team. In December, following the dismissal of Lito Vidigal, he took over the first team. On his debut on 4 December, the team lost 2–1 at S.C. Farense. On 5 March 2021, he resigned having won 5 of 17 games for the bottom-placed team.

== Managerial statistics ==
Team	From	To	Record				
Team	From	To	G	W	D	L	Win %
Kashiwa Reysol	2016	2016	3	0	1	2	0.00
Total			3	0	1	2	0.00

== Honours ==
Ferroviária

- Campeonato Paulista Série A2: 2015

Santa Cruz

- Copa do Nordeste: 2016
- Campeonato Pernambucano: 2016
