= Leonan (footballer, born 2000) =

Brazilian footballer

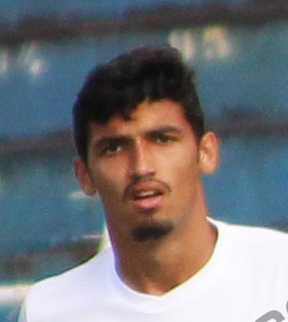
- Leonan in 2019

Personal information
- Full name: Leonan Santos de Abreu
- Date of birth: 25 August 2000 (age 26)
- Place of birth: Campos dos Goytacazes, Brazil
- Height: 1.89 m (6 ft 2 in)
- Position: Centre-back

Team information
- Current team: Figueirense (loan)
- Number: 3

Youth career
- Vasco da Gama
- 2018–2020: Desportivo Brasil

Senior career*
Years	Team	Apps	(Gls)
2019–2022	Desportivo Brasil	28	(0)
2021	→ União Suzano (loan)	18	(2)
2022	→ XV de Jaú (loan)	16	(2)
2023–	Capivariano	61	(2)
2023	→ Sampaio Corrêa (loan)	1	(0)
2024	→ Treze (loan)	16	(0)
2024	→ Hercílio Luz (loan)	3	(0)
2025	→ Mirassol (loan)	0	(0)
2025	→ CSA (loan)	0	(0)
2026–	→ Figueirense (loan)	14	(0)
- * Club domestic league appearances and goals as of 10 November 2026

Leonan Santos de Abreu (born 5 August 2000), simply known as Leonan, is a Brazilian footballer who plays as a centre-back for Figueirense loan by Capivariano.

== Career ==
Leonan was born in Campos dos Goytacazes, Rio de Janeiro, and represented Vasco da Gama and Desportivo Brasil as a youth. After making his senior debut with the latter in 2019, he would serve loan deals at União Suzano and XV de Jaú before signing for Capivariano ahead of the 2023 season.

On 3 July 2023, Leonan was loaned to Série B side Sampaio Corrêa for the remainder of the year. He returned to his parent club after just one match, and moved to Treze also in a temporary deal on 29 March 2024, before joining Hercílio Luz also on loan on 18 September.

Back to Capivariano for the 2025 Campeonato Paulista Série A2, Leonan was an undisputed starter during the competition, helping in the club's promotion as champions and being named in the Team of the year. On 11 April of that year, he was announced at Série A side Mirassol on loan.

== Career statistics ==
As of 16 April 2025.

Club	Season	League			State League		Cup		Continental		Other		Total	
Club	Season	Division	Apps	Goals	Apps	Goals	Apps	Goals	Apps	Goals	Apps	Goals	Apps	Goals
Desportivo Brasil	2019	Paulista A3	—		—		—		—		1 (Note: Appearance(s) in Copa Paulista)	0	1	0
Desportivo Brasil	2020	Paulista A3	—		4	0	—		—		—		4	0
Desportivo Brasil	2021	Paulista A3	—		14	0	—		—		—		14	0
Desportivo Brasil	2022	Paulista A3	—		9	0	—		—		—		9	0
Desportivo Brasil	Total		—		27	0	—		—		1	0	28	0
União Suzano (loan)	2021	Paulista 2ª Divisão	—		18	2	—		—		—		18	2
XV de Jaú (loan)	2022	Paulista 2ª Divisão	—		16	2	—		—		—		16	2
Capivariano	2023	Paulista A3	—		21	2	—		—		—		21	2
Capivariano	2024	Paulista A2	—		12	0	—		—		—		12	0
Capivariano	2025	Paulista A2	—		20	0	—		—		—		20	0
Capivariano	Total		—		53	2	—		—		—		53	2
Sampaio Corrêa (loan)	2023	Série B	1	0	—		—		—		—		1	0
Treze (loan)	2024	Série D	14	0	2	0	—		—		—		16	0
Hercílio Luz (loan)	2024	Série D	—		—		—		—		3 (Note: Appearance(s) in Copa Santa Catarina)	0	3	0
Mirassol (loan)	2025	Série A	0	0	—		—		—		—		0	0
Career total			15	0	116	6	0	0	0	0	4	0	135	6

== Honours ==
Capivariano

- Campeonato Paulista Série A3: 2023
- Campeonato Paulista Série A2: 2025

Individual

- Campeonato Paulista Série A2 Team of the year: 2025
