= 2025 Copa do Brasil finals =

2025 Copa do Brasil Finals
Corinthians	Vasco da Gama
(São Paulo (state))	(Rio de Janeiro (state))
2	1

First leg
Corinthians	Vasco da Gama
0	0
- Date: 17 December 2025
- Venue: Neo Química Arena, São Paulo
- Man of the Match: Andrés Gómez (Vasco da Gama)
- Referee: Rafael Klein (Rio Grande do Sul)
- Attendance: 47,339
- Weather: Mostly Cloudy; 16 °C (61 °F); 72% humidity

Second leg
Vasco da Gama	Corinthians
1	2
- Date: 21 December 2025
- Venue: Maracanã, Rio de Janeiro
- Man of the Match: Yuri Alberto (Corinthians)
- Referee: Wilton Pereira Sampaio (Goiás)
- Attendance: 67,111
- Weather: Partly Cloudy; 28 °C (82 °F); 74% humidity

The 2025 Copa do Brasil Finals were the final two-legged tie that decided the 2025 Copa do Brasil, the 37th season of the Copa do Brasil, Brazil's national cup football tournament organised by the Brazilian Football Confederation.

The finals were contested in a two-legged home-and-away format between Corinthians, from São Paulo, and Vasco da Gama, from Rio de Janeiro. Corinthians and Vasco da Gama reached the Copa do Brasil finals for the eighth and third time, respectively.

The finals took place on 17 and 21 December 2025. A draw by CBF was held on 22 October 2025 to determine the home-and-away teams for the semi-finals and finals. The first leg was hosted by Corinthians at Neo Química Arena in São Paulo, while the second leg was hosted by Vasco da Gama at Maracanã in Rio de Janeiro.

Corinthians defeated Vasco da Gama 2–1 on aggregate to win their fourth title. As the winners, they qualified for the 2026 Copa Libertadores group stage and the 2026 Supercopa do Brasil.

== Teams ==
Team	Previous finals appearances (bold indicates winners)
(São Paulo (state)) Corinthians	7 (**1995**, 2001, **2002**, 2008, **2009**, 2018, 2022)
(Rio de Janeiro (state)) Vasco da Gama	2 (2006, **2011**)

=== Road to the final ===
Note: In all scores below, the score of the home team is given first.

(São Paulo (state)) Corinthians			Round	(Rio de Janeiro (state)) Vasco da Gama		
Opponent	Venue	Score		Opponent	Venue	Score
Bye			First round	(Mato Grosso) União Rondonópolis	Away	0–3
Bye			Second round	(Rio de Janeiro (state)) Nova Iguaçu	Away	0–3
(São Paulo (state)) Novorizontino (won 2–0 on aggregate)	Away	0–1	Third round	(Paraná (state)) Operário Ferroviário (tied 2–2 on aggregate, won 7–6 on penalties)	Away	1–1
(São Paulo (state)) Novorizontino (won 2–0 on aggregate)	Home	1–0	Third round	(Paraná (state)) Operário Ferroviário (tied 2–2 on aggregate, won 7–6 on penalties)	Home	1–1
(São Paulo (state)) Palmeiras (won 3–0 on aggregate)	Home	1–0	Round of 16	(Alagoas) CSA (won 3–1 on aggregate)	Away	0–0
(São Paulo (state)) Palmeiras (won 3–0 on aggregate)	Away	0–2	Round of 16	(Alagoas) CSA (won 3–1 on aggregate)	Home	3–1
(Paraná (state)) Athletico Paranaense (won 3–0 on aggregate)	Away	0–1	Quarter-finals	(Rio de Janeiro (state)) Botafogo (tied 2–2 on aggregate, won 5–3 on penalties)	Home	1–1
(Paraná (state)) Athletico Paranaense (won 3–0 on aggregate)	Home	2–0	Quarter-finals	(Rio de Janeiro (state)) Botafogo (tied 2–2 on aggregate, won 5–3 on penalties)	Away	1–1
(Minas Gerais) Cruzeiro (tied 2–2 on aggregate, won 5–4 on penalties)	Away	0–1	Semi-finals	(Rio de Janeiro (state)) Fluminense (tied 2–2 on aggregate, won 4–3 on penalties)	Home	2–1
(Minas Gerais) Cruzeiro (tied 2–2 on aggregate, won 5–4 on penalties)	Home	1–2	Semi-finals	(Rio de Janeiro (state)) Fluminense (tied 2–2 on aggregate, won 4–3 on penalties)	Away	1–0

== Format ==
In the finals, the teams played a single-elimination tournament with the following rules:

- The finals were played on a home-and-away two-legged basis. The home-and-away teams for both legs were determined by a draw held on 22 October 2025 at the CBF headquarters in Rio de Janeiro, Brazil.
- If tied on aggregate, the away goals rule and extra time would not be used and the penalty shoot-out would be used to determine the winners. (Regulations Article 20).

== Matches ==
=== First leg ===
17 December 2025
21:30 UTC−3

Corinthians (São Paulo (state))	0–0	(Rio de Janeiro (state)) Vasco da Gama
	Report

Neo Química Arena, São Paulo
Attendance: 47,339
Referee: Rafael Klein (Rio Grande do Sul)

Corinthians	Vasco da Gama

GK	1	(Brazil) Hugo Souza
RB	2	(Brazil) Matheuzinho
CB	5	(Brazil) André Ramalho
CB	13	(Brazil) Gustavo Henrique
LB	21	(Brazil) Matheus Bidu
DM	14	(Brazil) Raniele	(yellow card) 45+3'	(substituted off) 67'
CM	27	(Brazil) Breno Bidon		(substituted off) 52'
CM	70	(Venezuela) José Andrés Martínez		(substituted off) 52'
AM	8	(Argentina) Rodrigo Garro (c)		(substituted off) 67'
CF	9	(Brazil) Yuri Alberto
CF	10	(Netherlands) Memphis Depay		(substituted off) 83'
Substitutes:
GK	40	(Brazil) Felipe Longo
DF	25	(Brazil) Cacá
DF	26	(Argentina) Fabrizio Angileri
DF	47	(Brazil) João Pedro
MF	7	(Brazil) Maycon		(substituted on) 52'
MF	19	(Peru) André Carrillo		(substituted on) 52'
MF	35	(Brazil) Charles
MF	49	(Brazil) André		(substituted on) 67'
MF	61	(Brazil) Dieguinho		(substituted on) 83'
FW	11	(Paraguay) Ángel Romero
FW	29	(Brazil) Vitinho	(yellow card) 74'	(substituted on) 67'
FW	56	(Brazil) Gui Negão
Manager:
(Brazil) Dorival Júnior

GK	1	(Brazil) Léo Jardim
RB	96	(Brazil) Paulo Henrique
CB	46	(Colombia) Carlos Cuesta
CB	35	(Brazil) Robert Renan	(yellow card) 7'
LB	2	(Uruguay) Puma Rodríguez
CM	88	(Brazil) Cauan Barros
CM	23	(Brazil) Thiago Mendes
RW	17	(Portugal) Nuno Moreira		(substituted off) 77'
AM	10	(Brazil) Philippe Coutinho (c)		(substituted off) 89'
LW	11	(Colombia) Andrés Gómez
CF	77	(Brazil) Rayan
Substitutes:
GK	13	(Brazil) Daniel Fuzato
GK	37	(Brazil) Pablo
DF	12	(Brazil) Victor Luis
DF	29	(Brazil) Lucas Oliveira	(yellow card) 45+3'
DF	43	(Brazil) Lucas Freitas
MF	3	(Brazil) Tchê Tchê
MF	18	(Brazil) Paulinho
MF	25	(Brazil) Hugo Moura
FW	7	(Brazil) David
FW	9	(Brazil) Matheus França		(substituted on) 89'
FW	19	(Brazil) GB
FW	99	(Argentina) Pablo Vegetti		(substituted on) 77'
Manager:
(Brazil) Fernando Diniz

Man of the Match:
(Colombia) Andrés Gómez (Vasco da Gama)

Assistant referees:
Guilherme Dias Camilo (Minas Gerais)
Rafael da Silva Alves (Rio Grande do Sul)
Fourth official:
Davi de Oliveira Lacerda (Espírito Santo)
Fifth official:
Michael Stanislau (Rio Grande do Sul)
Video assistant referee:
Daniel Nobre Bins (Rio Grande do Sul)
Assistant video assistant referees:
André da Silva Bitencourt (Rio Grande do Sul)
Gilberto Rodrigues Castro Júnior (Pernambuco)

=== Second leg ===
21 December 2025
18:00 UTC−3

Vasco da Gama (Rio de Janeiro (state))	1–2	(São Paulo (state)) Corinthians
Moreira 41'	Report	Yuri Alberto 18'; Depay 62'

Maracanã, Rio de Janeiro
Attendance: 67,111
Referee: Wilton Pereira Sampaio (Goiás)

Vasco da Gama	Corinthians

GK	1	(Brazil) Léo Jardim
RB	96	(Brazil) Paulo Henrique
CB	46	(Colombia) Carlos Cuesta	(yellow card) 47'	(substituted off) 88'
CB	35	(Brazil) Robert Renan
LB	2	(Uruguay) Puma Rodríguez		(substituted off) 88'
CM	88	(Brazil) Cauan Barros		(substituted off) 66'
CM	23	(Brazil) Thiago Mendes	(yellow card) 60'
RW	17	(Portugal) Nuno Moreira		(substituted off) 78'
AM	10	(Brazil) Philippe Coutinho (c)		(substituted off) 78'
LW	11	(Colombia) Andrés Gómez
CF	77	(Brazil) Rayan
Substitutes:
GK	13	(Brazil) Daniel Fuzato
DF	12	(Brazil) Victor Luis
DF	29	(Brazil) Lucas Oliveira
DF	43	(Brazil) Lucas Freitas
MF	3	(Brazil) Tchê Tchê		(substituted on) 78'
MF	18	(Brazil) Paulinho
MF	25	(Brazil) Hugo Moura
FW	7	(Brazil) David		(substituted on) 88'
FW	9	(Brazil) Matheus França		(substituted on) 88'
FW	15	(Argentina) Benjamín Garré
FW	19	(Brazil) GB		(substituted on) 78'
FW	99	(Argentina) Pablo Vegetti	(yellow card) 85'	(substituted on) 66'
Other disciplinary actions:
TS	—	(Brazil) Ricardo Colbachini	(yellow card) 75'
Manager:
(Brazil) Fernando Diniz

GK	1	(Brazil) Hugo Souza
RB	2	(Brazil) Matheuzinho	(yellow card) 84'
CB	5	(Brazil) André Ramalho
CB	13	(Brazil) Gustavo Henrique
LB	21	(Brazil) Matheus Bidu		(substituted off) 83'
DM	14	(Brazil) Raniele		(substituted off) 67'
CM	70	(Venezuela) José Andrés Martínez
CM	7	(Brazil) Maycon (c)		(substituted off) 78'
AM	27	(Brazil) Breno Bidon		(substituted off) 78'
CF	9	(Brazil) Yuri Alberto	(yellow card) 60'	(substituted off) 83'
CF	10	(Netherlands) Memphis Depay
Substitutes:
GK	40	(Brazil) Felipe Longo
DF	25	(Brazil) Cacá
DF	26	(Argentina) Fabrizio Angileri		(substituted on) 83'
DF	47	(Brazil) João Pedro	(yellow card) 90+4'	(substituted on) 83'
MF	8	(Argentina) Rodrigo Garro		(substituted on) 78'
MF	19	(Peru) André Carrillo	(yellow card) 81'	(substituted on) 67'
MF	37	(Brazil) Ryan
MF	49	(Brazil) André		(substituted on) 78'
MF	61	(Brazil) Dieguinho
FW	11	(Paraguay) Ángel Romero
FW	29	(Brazil) Vitinho
FW	56	(Brazil) Gui Negão
Other disciplinary actions:
TS	—	(Brazil) Raony Thadeu	(red card) 90+6'
Manager:
(Brazil) Dorival Júnior				(yellow card) 53'

Man of the Match:
(Brazil) Yuri Alberto (Corinthians)

Assistant referees:
Bruno Boschilia (Paraná)
Victor Hugo Imazu dos Santos (Paraná)
Fourth official:
Paulo César Zanovelli (Minas Gerais)
Fifth official:
Nailton Júnior de Sousa Oliveira (Ceará)
Video assistant referee:
Marco Aurélio Augusto Fazekas Ferreira (Minas Gerais)
Assistant video assistant referees:
Helen Aparecida Gonçalves Silva Araújo (Minas Gerais)
Diego Pombo Lopez (Bahia)

== See also ==
- 2025 Campeonato Brasileiro Série A
