= 2025 Sport Club Corinthians Paulista season =

Corinthians 2025 football season

Corinthians
2025 season
- President: Augusto Melo (suspended from 26 May; impeached on 9 August); Osmar Stabile (interim from 26 May – 26 August; elected on 26 August)
- Manager: Ramón Díaz (until 17 April); Orlando Ribeiro (caretaker, 18 April – 27 April); Dorival Júnior (from 28 April)
- Stadium: Neo Química Arena
- Série A: 13th
- Copa do Brasil: Winners
- Campeonato Paulista: Winners
- Copa Libertadores: Third stage
- Copa Sudamericana: Group stage
- Top goalscorer: League: Yuri Alberto (10); All: Yuri Alberto (19)
- Highest home attendance: 48,932 vs Palmeiras (27 March 2025)
- Lowest home attendance: 31,003 vs Juventude (7 December 2025)
- Average home league attendance: 40,311
Home colors	Away colors	Third colors

The 2025 season was the 116th season in the history of Sport Club Corinthians Paulista. The season covered the period from January 2025 to December 2025.

The season started earlier than usual and had a mid-season break due to the 2025 FIFA Club World Cup in June-July.

== Background ==
=== Melo's impeachment and the VaideBet case ===
On 2 December 2024, an impeachment voting led by the president of the club's deliberative council Romeu Tuma Júnior was suspended by the common Justice. The voting was politically influenced by the opposition group Renovação e Transparência that led the club through six elections between 2007 and 2023, until their candidate lost to Melo. The impeachment complaint is primarily based on alleged irregularities in the contract with VaideBet, an online gambling company that was announced as the club's main sponsor in January 2024 (the biggest sponsorship contract for a football club in Brazil's history), which was rescinded five months later due to an anti-corruption clause, as there were concerns regarding an investigation due to a possible fake company that intermediated the deal between both parties. Involvement of members from both the club and the company are still being investigated since the fallout of the deal by the Civil Police (including Marcelo Mariano, a strong ally of Melo, who was a direct responsible for the negotiations with the company for the sponsorship). Melo was pressured throughout 2024 to removed Mariano from his position, but refused to do so. He stepped down on 16 January 2025.

On 20 January, a second meeting of the deliberative council to decide on the impeachment was held. The 240 members of the council that were present voted 126–114 to approve the admissibility of the dismissal process. However the meeting ended up suspended before a vote could be taken to decide whether or not Melo would be removed. The impeachment inquiry was treated as a coup d'état by the current presidency and the majority of supporters of the club since its inception due to the strong participation of the previous commanding group.

The following months saw Melo's presidency continue to fold, including multiple members of the club's board resigning (totalling more than 20 members leaving since the start of his term). On 22 May, Melo, Marcelo Mariano, Sérgio Moura (former marketing superintendent) and Alex Cassundé (owner of the company that acted as mediator between the VaideBet contract signing) were indicted by the Polícia Civil do Estado de São Paulo on breach of trust qualified theft, criminal association and money laundering. Despite an enormous pressure from other members of the club's board and the supporters (including the main torcidas organizadas), Melo announced that he would not resign and reinforced that he is innocent.

On 26 May, the first meeting regarding the impeachment was held. A total of 234 members of the council took part in the voting for Melo's temporary removal from the presidency, in which the decision was approved by a 176–57 (with 1 abstention). The first vice-president Osmar Stabile became the interim chairman of the club effective immediately. The next step will be a new voting held by the associates on 9 August. In case they do not approve the original decision, Melo will be reinstated. Should the impeachment be approved, a new election will be held featuring the counselors only.

On 31 May, Melo attempted a coup to regain his position as president through his allies after a change in the deliberative counsil command: the counselor Maria Angela de Souza Ocampos took charge of the counsil based on a decision by the ethics council of that organization, dated 9 April, which determined the removal of Tuma Júnior from the presidency of the council. Although the order was issued almost two months ago, it was only made official on Friday in a letter sent to the entity's secretariat by counselor Mário Mello, the rapporteur of the case. Melo, alongside his allies, went to Parque São Jorge, the club's registered office located in the district of Tatuapé, and demanded to take back his position, causing an argument in the president room. A few hours later, some fans invaded the room to confront Melo and the confusion ceased after the Military Police intervened.

The five biggest Corinthians' torcidas organizadas invaded and occupied Parque São Jorge on 3 June. They locked the main gates and demanded several estructural changes that they deemed inegotiable, including the Fiel Torcedor (the club's membership program) right to vote, changes to the club's statute and punishment to the responsibles for leaving major debts in their respective administrations. The invasion began during the afternoon and eventually dissipated during the night, as some supporters revealed that interim president Stabile promised to accept some of their demands, like major issues related to the club's youth squad. The statute reform though would require approvals of the Councils and even a general assembly. The protest was pacific and there were no aggressions or vandalisms.

On 10 July, the Public Prosecutor's Office of São Paulo denounced Melo, Mariano, Moura and Cassundé, alongside two other entrepreneurs for money laundering. The prosecutors also requested that the accused pay a total of R$40 million in indemnity to the club. Two weeks later, a judge accepted the report, meaning that all of them will become defendants in a criminal trial.

On 9 August, Melo's impeachment was approved by a 1413–620 voting. Stabile will remain the interim president until a new election will be held on a yet to be decided date. This time only counselors only lifetime or triennals counselors will be able to vote and run for the election. The new president will have a temporary term until December 2026, when Melo's original term was due. The club's new president is expected to be elected by the 299 counselors on 25 August. The candidates must either be a lifetime counselour or previously elected for the counsil at least twice.

=== Presidential election ===
On 25 August, the election to decide Corinthians' new president for the remainder of the 2024–2026 term was held featuring a total of 264 counselors. Osmar Stabile was confirmed as the new president after receiving 199 votes. The other two candidates, Roque Citadini (lifetime counselor and former vice-president during Alberto Dualib's 2001-2004 term) and André Castro (counselor and former investments manager) received 50 and 14 votes, respectively.

=== Neo Química Arena's capacity increase and facial recognition system ===
On 17 February, the club officially announced the Neo Química Arena's new capacity after the Polícia Militar authorized the increase of 1060 seats, pushing the stadium's total to 48,905. The increase was already in effect during the 12 February match against Santos, which saw the club reach its highest attendance at the stadium with a total of 48,169 supporters. The club broke the record once again during the Campeonato Paulista final against their biggest rival Palmeiras as 48,932 people attended the match.

On 13 July, the stadium had its first match with the mandatory facial recognition system for tickets. The Lei Geral do Esporte (Lei nº 14.597/2023) determined that such system would be obligatory for access in Brazilian football stadiums with a full capacity of more than 20 thousand people. The clubs had two years to implement the system, but Corinthians hadn't implemented until now. During the mid-season break, the club had a task force to make sure the system would be available for the first match in July, under possible punishment of playing with a reduced capacity. The new system will make sure that each ticket is now for personal use and non-transferable.

== Kits ==
Supplier: Nike / Main sponsor: Esportes da Sorte

Kits from the 2025 season
Home	Home alt.^{1}	Home alt.^{2}	Home alt.^{3}	Home alt.^{4}	Away	Away alt.^{1}	Away alt.^{2}	Third	Goalkeeper^{1}	Goalkeeper^{2}	Goalkeeper^{3}

Kits from the 2024 season
Home	Home alt.	Away	Away alt.^{1}	Away alt.^{2}	Third	Goalkeeper^{1}	Goalkeeper^{2}	Goalkeeper^{3}

=== Kit information ===
This is Nike's 23rd year supplying Corinthians kit, having taken over from Topper at the beginning of the 2003 season. The deal was renewed for another 10 seasons on June.

- Home: The club revealed their new home kit for the 2025 season on 26 April. The kit maintain Corinthians's traditional colours of black and white. The shirt has a white body and black sleeves with a black stripe on both sides, and is complemented by black shorts and white socks (with a black stripe on each). The new kit pays tribute to the 25th anniversary of the 2000 FIFA Club World Championship, as Timão's crest and Nike's logo are featured in the centre of the shirt, mirroring the same template used in the title win.
- Away: On 14 May, Corinthians released their away kit. It also pays tribute to the 25th anniversary of the 2000 world title and mirrors the home kit layout. The difference is the inversion of the black and white colors, but the main combination for the away kit remains all black.
- Third: On 24 September, Corinthians released their third kit. The kit is part of Nike bringing back the Total 90 era with new 25-26 third kits for their elite teams, featuring the classic T90 design. It showcases a retro-futuristic aesthetic with dynamic gradient patterns, angular fade graphics, and club-branding nods to the Nike Total 90 look of the mid-2000s, featuring a predominantly black design with orange logos and details, with a special T90 number on the front.
- GK: The new goalkeeper kits are based on Nike's goalkeeper template for the season, but also featuring the Corinthians and Nike logos centralized, with the club's crest being above the supplier's, as opposite to the players kits.

=== Kit usage ===
As of 21 December 2025

Kit	Combination	Usage
Kits from the 2025 season
Home	White shirt with black sleeves, black shorts and white socks.	Campeonato Brasileiro: used at home against Internacional, Cruzeiro, Fortaleza, Bahia, Palmeiras, Mirassol, São Paulo, Botafogo and Juventude; used away against Flamengo and Mirassol.; Copa do Brasil: used at home against Palmeiras and Athletico Paranaense; used away against Palmeiras.; Copa Sudamericana: used at home against América de Cali.
Home alt.^{1}	White shirt with black sleeves, black shorts (away kit) and white socks.	Campeonato Brasileiro: used at home against Vitória and Red Bull Bragantino.
Home alt.^{2}	White shirt with black sleeves, white shorts and white socks.	Campeonato Brasileiro: used away against Atlético Mineiro, Ceará, Botafogo, Juventude, Sport Recife, Vitória and Red Bull Bragantino.; Copa do Brasil: used at home against Vasco da Gama; used away against Novorizontino, Athletico Paranaense and Vasco da Gama.
Home alt.^{3}	White shirt with black sleeves, white shorts and black socks.	Campeonato Brasileiro: used away against Grêmio and Fortaleza.
Home alt.^{4}	White shirt with black sleeves, black shorts and black socks.	Campeonato Brasileiro: used away against Internacional and Cruzeiro.; Copa do Brasil: used away against Cruzeiro.
Away	Black shirt with white sleeves, black shorts and black socks.	Campeonato Brasileiro: used at home against Santos; used away against São Paulo, Vasco da Gama, Fluminense and Santos.; Copa do Brasil: used at home against Novorizontino.; Copa Sudamericana: used away against Huracán.
Away alt.^{1}	Black shirt with white sleeves, white shorts and black socks.	
Away alt.^{2}	Black shirt with white sleeves, white shorts and white socks.	Copa Sudamericana: used away against Racing.
Third	Black shirt, black shorts and black socks; all details in orange	Campeonato Brasileiro: used at home against Flamengo, Atlético Mineiro, Grêmio and Ceará.; Copa do Brasil: used at home against Cruzeiro.
Goalkeeper^{1}	Yellow shirt, yellow shorts and yellow socks.	Campeonato Brasileiro: used at home against Santos, Vitória, Red Bull Bragantino, Cruzeiro, Bahia, Palmeiras and São Paulo; used away against Flamengo, Atlético Mineiro, Grêmio, Ceará, São Paulo, Botafogo, Juventude, Vasco da Gama, Fluminense, Sport Recife, Internacional, Vitória and Red Bull Bragantino.; Copa do Brasil: used at home against Novorizontino, Palmeiras and Athletico Paranaense; used away against Palmeiras, Athletico Paranaense and Vasco da Gama.; Copa Sudamericana: used at home against América de Cali; used away against Racing.
Goalkeeper^{2}	Black shirt, black shorts and black socks.	Campeonato Brasileiro: used at home against Internacional, Fortaleza and Mirassol; used away against Mirassol.
Goalkeeper^{3}	Orange shirt, orange shorts and orange socks.	Campeonato Brasileiro: used at home against Flamengo, Atlético Mineiro, Grêmio, Ceará, Botafogo and Juventude; used away against Santos, Cruzeiro and Fortaleza.; Copa do Brasil: used at home against Cruzeiro and Vasco da Gama; used away against Cruzeiro.
Kits from the 2024 season
Home	White shirt with fading black sleeves and bottom, black shorts and white socks.	Campeonato Brasileiro: used at home against Sport Recife; used away against Palmeiras.; Campeonato Paulista: used at home against Velo Clube, Água Santa, Noroeste, São Bernardo, Guarani, Mirassol and Palmeiras; used away against Palmeiras (twice) and Portuguesa.; Copa Libertadores: used at home against Universidad Central and Barcelona.; Copa Sudamericana: used at home against Huracán and Racing.
Home alt.	White shirt with fading black sleeves and bottom, white shorts and white socks.	Campeonato Paulista: used away against Novorizontino.; Copa Libertadores: used away against Universidad Central.; Copa Sudamericana: used away against América de Cali.
Away	Black shirt, black shorts and black socks.	Campeonato Brasileiro: used at home against Vasco da Gama and Fluminense.; Campeonato Paulista: used at home against Santos (twice); used away against Red Bull Bragantino, São Paulo and Ponte Preta.
Away alt.^{1}	Black shirt, white shorts and white socks.	Copa Libertadores: used away against Barcelona.
Away alt.^{2}	Black shirt, white shorts and black socks.	Campeonato Brasileiro: used away against Bahia.
Third	Black and white shirt, black and white shorts and black and white socks.	
Goalkeeper^{1}	Yellow shirt, yellow shorts and yellow socks.	Campeonato Brasileiro: used at home against Fluminense; used away against Bahia.; Campeonato Paulista: used at home against São Bernardo and Palmeiras; used away against São Paulo and Palmeiras (twice).; Copa Libertadores: used at home against Universidad Central and Barcelona; used away against Universidad Central.; Copa Sudamericana: used at home against Huracán and Racing.
Goalkeeper^{2}	Blue shirt, blue shorts and blue socks.	Campeonato Brasileiro: used at home against Sport Recife.; Copa do Brasil: used away against Novorizontino.; Campeonato Paulista: used at home against Velo Clube, Noroeste, Santos (twice) and Guarani; used away against Red Bull Bragantino, Ponte Preta and Portuguesa.; Copa Libertadores: used away against Barcelona.; Copa Sudamericana: used away against América de Cali and Huracán.
Goalkeeper^{3}	Orange shirt, orange shorts and orange socks.	Campeonato Brasileiro: used at home against Vasco da Gama; used away against Palmeiras.; Campeonato Paulista: used at home against Água Santa and Mirassol; used away against Novorizontino.

== Squad ==
As of 14 August 2025

Note: Flags indicate national team as defined under FIFA eligibility rules; some limited exceptions apply. Players may hold more than one non-FIFA nationality.

No.	Pos.	Nation	Player
1	GK	BRA	Hugo Souza
2	DF	BRA	Matheuzinho
3	DF	ECU	Félix Torres
5	DF	BRA	André Ramalho
7	MF	BRA	Maycon (on loan from Shakhtar Donetsk)
8	MF	ARG	Rodrigo Garro
9	FW	BRA	Yuri Alberto
10	FW	NED	Memphis Depay
11	FW	PAR	Ángel Romero (captain)
13	DF	BRA	Gustavo Henrique
14	MF	BRA	Raniele
19	MF	PER	André Carrillo
21	DF	BRA	Matheus Bidu
22	FW	ESP	Héctor Hernández
25	DF	BRA	Cacá
26	DF	ARG	Fabrizio Angileri

No.	Pos.	Nation	Player
27	MF	BRA	Breno Bidon
29	FW	BRA	Vitinho
31	FW	BRA	Kayke
32	GK	BRA	Matheus Donelli
35	MF	BRA	Charles
37	MF	BRA	Ryan
40	GK	BRA	Felipe Longo
43	FW	BRA	Talles Magno (on loan from New York City FC)
46	DF	BRA	Hugo
47	DF	BRA	João Pedro
49	MF	BRA	André
54	MF	BRA	Bahia
56	FW	BRA	Gui Negão
61	FW	BRA	Dieguinho
70	MF	VEN	José Andrés Martínez

=== Squad number changes ===
Notes:

- Squad numbers last updated on 28 February 2025.
- Player^{*} – Player who joined Corinthians permanently or on loan during the season.
- Player^{†} – Player who departed Corinthians permanently or on loan during the season.

Player	Pos.	Prev. No.	New No.	Previous player to wear number	Notes
(Brazil) João Pedro	DF	—	47	Himself (2024)	João Pedro returned from loan (January 2025)
(Argentina) Rodrigo Garro	MF	10	8	Charles (2025)	Charles was re-allocated number 35 (February 2025)
(Brazil) Charles	MF	8	35	Léo Mana (2025)	Mana was re-allocated number 33 (February 2025)
(Brazil) Léo Mana^{†}	DF	35	33	Ruan Oliveira (2024)	Ruan departed the club (December 2024)
(Netherlands) Memphis Depay	FW	94	10	Rodrigo Garro (2025)	Garro took the number 8 shirt (February 2025)
(Argentina) Fabrizio Angileri^{*}	DF	—	26	Guilherme Biro (2024)	Biro left on loan (September 2024)
(Brazil) Vitinho^{*}	FW	—	29	Arthur Sousa (2024)	Sousa departed the club (August 2024)

== Managerial changes ==
On 17 April, Ramón Díaz was fired after recurring poor performances in the season. Despite winning the Campeonato Paulista, the club only won one match among six played after the title, including a 2–0 home defeat a day earlier against Fluminense. The club's current U-20 coach Orlando Ribeiro was announced as the caretaker for their next training session and the next match against Sport Recife on 19 April.

On 28 April, Dorival Júnior was announced as the club's new manager. He was most recently the manager of the Brazil national football team, before being sacked a month prior.

Manager	Signed from	Date of signing	Date of departure	Signed with	Source
(Argentina) Ramón Díaz	Free agent	10 July 2024	17 April 2025	—	
(Brazil) Orlando Ribeiro	Corinthians U-20 head coach (caretaker)	18 April 2025	27 April 2025	Returned to the U-20 team	
(Brazil) Dorival Júnior	Free agent	28 April 2025	—	—	

== Transfers ==
=== Transfers in ===
#	Position:	Player	Transferred from	Fee	Date	Team	Source
1	GK	(Brazil) Hugo Souza	(Brazil) Flamengo	€800,000 (~R$4,800,000) (Note: Hugo Souza was on loan until December 2024 with an option to buy.)	1 January 2025	First team	
25	DF	(Brazil) Cacá	(Japan) Tokushima Vortis	US$4,000,000 (~R$24,000,000) (Note: Cacá was on loan until December 2024 with an obligation to buy after playing 3150 minutes.)	10 January 2025	First team	
26	DF	(Argentina) Fabrizio Angileri	(Spain) Getafe	Free transfer (Rescinded contract)	27 February 2025	First team	
29	FW	(Brazil) Vitinho	Free agent	Free transfer	11 August 2025	First team	

=== Loans in ===
#	Position	Player	Loaned from	Date	Loan expires	Team	Source
7	MF	(Brazil) Maycon	(Ukraine) Shakhtar Donetsk	20 January 2025 (Note: Maycon has been on loan since March 2022 with the deal being renewed each season ever since.)	31 December 2025	First team	
43	FW	(Brazil) Talles Magno	(United States) New York City FC	3 April 2025 (Note: Talles Magno has been on loan since 9 August 2024 until 31 July 2025. The deal was extended on this date.)	31 December 2025	First team	

=== Transfers out ===
#	Position	Player	Transferred to	Fee	Date	Team	Source
30	MF	(Brazil) Matheus Araújo	(Brazil) Ceará	Free transfer (End of contract)	23 December 2024	First team	
4	DF	(Brazil) Caetano	(Japan) Vissel Kobe	Free transfer (End of contract)	1 January 2025	First team	
	MF	(Brazil) Roni	(Brazil) Mirassol	Undisclosed	10 January 2025	First team	
16	FW	(Brazil) Pedro Henrique	(Brazil) Ceará	Undisclosed	10 January 2025	First team	
	MF	(Brazil) Guilherme Biro	(United Arab Emirates) Sharjah	US$2,500,000 (~R$14,200,000) (Note: Guilherme Biro was on loan since September 2024 until June 2025 with an option to buy.)	28 April 2025	First team	
17	FW	(Brazil) Giovane	(Italy) Hellas Verona	Free transfer (End of contract)	7 June 2025	First team	
77	MF	(Brazil) Igor Coronado	(United Arab Emirates) Sharjah	Free transfer (Rescinded contract)	27 June 2025	First team	
	FW	(Uruguay) Franco Delgado	Free agent	Rescinded contract	30 June 2025	Academy	
	DF	(Brazil) Rafael Venâncio	(Portugal) Famalicão	Free transfer (Rescinded contract)	1 August 2025	Academy	
57	FW	(Brazil) Kauê Furquim	(Brazil) Bahia	R$14,000,000	14 August 2025	Academy	

=== Loans out ===
#	Position	Player	Loaned to	Date	Loan expires	Team	Source
23	DF	(Brazil) Fagner	(Brazil) Cruzeiro	3 January 2025	31 December 2025	First team	
20	FW	(Brazil) Pedro Raul	(Brazil) Ceará	22 February 2025	31 December 2025	First team	
	FW	(Brazil) Juninho	(Belarus) Maxline Vitebsk	5 March 2025	31 December 2026	Academy	
41	DF	(Brazil) Renato	(Brazil) Atlético Goianiense	11 April 2025	31 March 2026	First team	
80	MF	(Brazil) Alex Santana	(Brazil) Grêmio	10 June 2025	31 December 2025	First team	
6	DF	(Ecuador) Diego Palacios	(Ukraine) Karpaty Lviv	14 August 2025	30 June 2026	First team	
33	DF	(Brazil) Léo Mana	(Brazil) Criciúma	14 August 2025	31 July 2026	First team	

== Squad statistics ==
No.	Pos.	Name	Campeonato Brasileiro		Copa do Brasil		Campeonato Paulista		Copa Libertadores		Copa Sudamericana		Total		Discipline	
No.	Pos.	Name	Apps	Goals	Apps	Goals	Apps	Goals	Apps	Goals	Apps	Goals	Apps	Goals	Yellow card	Red card
1	GK	(Brazil) Hugo Souza	26	0	10	0	12	0	4	0	4	0	56	0	6	0
2	DF	(Brazil) Matheuzinho	28 (3)	2	9	0	9 (1)	0	4	0	3 (1)	1	53 (5)	3	17	0
3	DF	(Ecuador) Félix Torres	8 (2)	0	1 (1)	0	10	0	2	1	4	0	25 (3)	1	7	2
5	DF	(Brazil) André Ramalho	20 (1)	0	9	0	5 (1)	0	2 (1)	0	4 (1)	0	40 (4)	0	10	0
7	MF	(Brazil) Maycon	16 (9)	3	7 (1)	0	1 (3)	0	0 (1)	0	2 (3)	0	26 (17)	3	6	0
8	MF	(Argentina) Rodrigo Garro	15 (4)	0	5 (3)	1	3 (3)	1	4	0	0 (1)	0	27 (11)	2	11	0
9	FW	(Brazil) Yuri Alberto	21 (5)	10	7 (2)	2	10 (4)	5	4	2	3 (2)	0	45 (13)	19	10	1
10	FW	(Netherlands) Memphis Depay	17 (6)	6	7 (1)	3	8 (4)	2	4	0	4	1	40 (11)	12	7	0
11	FW	(Paraguay) Ángel Romero	11 (16)	0	1 (1)	0	9 (5)	4	0 (4)	0	5 (1)	1	26 (27)	5	6	1
13	DF	(Brazil) Gustavo Henrique	23	3	8	1	4	0	2	0	2	0	39	4	9	0
14	MF	(Brazil) Raniele	25 (5)	2	5 (2)	0	10	0	2	0	3	1	45 (7)	3	17	0
19	MF	(Peru) André Carrillo	16 (6)	1	4 (4)	0	9 (3)	0	3 (1)	2	4 (2)	0	36 (16)	3	8	0
21	DF	(Brazil) Matheus Bidu	23 (3)	0	8	2	7 (3)	1	2	1	3	1	43 (6)	5	8	0
22	FW	(Spain) Héctor Hernández	3 (6)	1	1	1	2 (4)	0	0	0	2 (1)	0	8 (11)	2	0	0
25	DF	(Brazil) Cacá	16 (2)	2	2 (1)	0	7	0	0	0	2 (1)	0	27 (4)	2	8	0
26	DF	(Argentina) Fabrizio Angileri	17 (11)	0	3 (4)	0	3 (1)	0	0	0	3	0	26 (16)	0	9	0
27	MF	(Brazil) Breno Bidon	31 (2)	1	8 (2)	0	1 (3)	0	2 (2)	0	3 (2)	0	45 (11)	1	13	1
29	FW	(Brazil) Vitinho	4 (8)	0	0 (5)	0	0	0	0	0	0	0	4 (13)	0	2	0
31	FW	(Brazil) Kayke	4 (4)	0	1	0	0	0	0	0	0	0	5 (4)	0	0	0
32	GK	(Brazil) Matheus Donelli	5	0	0	0	4	0	0	0	2	0	11	0	1	0
35	MF	(Brazil) Charles	6 (11)	1	2 (5)	0	5 (5)	0	0	0	1 (2)	0	14 (23)	1	5	1
37	MF	(Brazil) Ryan	5 (11)	0	0 (3)	0	4 (9)	0	0	0	2	0	11 (23)	0	3	0
40	GK	(Brazil) Felipe Longo	6	0	0	0	0	0	0	0	0	0	6	0	0	0
43	FW	(Brazil) Talles Magno	9 (14)	1	1 (2)	0	6 (6)	5	0 (4)	0	2 (3)	0	18 (29)	6	4	0
46	DF	(Brazil) Hugo	6 (3)	0	0	0	6 (1)	0	2 (1)	0	0	0	14 (5)	0	3	0
47	DF	(Brazil) João Pedro	13 (3)	0	1 (1)	0	6 (1)	1	3	0	1	0	24 (5)	1	6	0
49	MF	(Brazil) André	1 (8)	2	0 (3)	0	0	0	0	0	0	0	1 (11)	2	1	0
50	GK	(Brazil) Cadu	0	0	0	0	0	0	0	0	0	0	0	0	0	0
51	GK	(Brazil) Kauê	1	0	0	0	0	0	0	0	0	0	1	0	0	0
52	DF	(Paraguay) Fernando Vera	0	0	0	0	0	0	0	0	0	0	0	0	0	0
53	DF	(Brazil) Gabriel Caipira	0	0	0	0	0	0	0	0	0	0	0	0	0	0
54	MF	(Brazil) Bahia	1 (1)	0	0	0	0 (1)	0	0	0	0	0	1 (2)	0	0	0
55	MF	(Brazil) Luiz Eduardo	0	0	0	0	1 (1)	0	0	0	0	0	1 (1)	0	0	0
56	FW	(Brazil) Gui Negão	12 (10)	3	2	2	0	0	0	0	0	0	14 (10)	5	4	0
58	DF	(Brazil) Guilherme Gama	0	0	0	0	0	0	0	0	0	0	0	0	0	0
59	DF	(Brazil) João Vitor	0	0	0	0	1 (1)	0	0	0	0	0	1 (1)	0	0	0
61	MF	(Brazil) Dieguinho	4 (9)	0	0 (1)	0	0	0	0	0	0	0	4 (10)	0	0	0
70	MF	(Venezuela) José Andrés Martínez	17 (7)	1	6 (2)	0	9 (2)	1	3	0	4 (2)	0	39 (13)	2	17	4
Players transferred out during the season
6	DF	(Ecuador) Diego Palacios	0	0	0	0	0 (3)	0	0	0	0	0	0 (3)	0	0	0
17	FW	(Brazil) Giovane	0	0	0	0	0 (1)	0	0	0	0 (1)	0	0 (2)	0	0	0
20	FW	(Brazil) Pedro Raul	0	0	0	0	3 (3)	1	0	0	0	0	3 (3)	1	1	0
33	DF	(Brazil) Léo Mana	3 (1)	0	0	0	6 (2)	0	0	0	2	0	11 (3)	0	1	0
41	DF	(Brazil) Renato	0	0	0	0	0	0	0	0	0	0	0	0	0	0
57	FW	(Brazil) Kauê Furquim	0	0	0	0	0	0	0	0	0	0	0	0	0	0
77	MF	(Brazil) Igor Coronado	3 (3)	1	1	0	9	2	0 (1)	0	0 (5)	0	13 (9)	3	2	0
80	MF	(Brazil) Alex Santana	1 (2)	0	1	0	6 (7)	2	1 (2)	0	1 (1)	0	10 (12)	2	5	0

=== Goals ===
As of 21 December 2025

Rank	Player	BR	CdB	CP	CL	CS	Total
1	(Brazil) Yuri Alberto	10	2	5	2	0	19
2	(Netherlands) Memphis Depay	6	3	2	0	1	12
3	(Brazil) Talles Magno	1	0	5	0	0	6
4	(Brazil) Gui Negão	3	2	0	0	0	5
4	(Brazil) Matheus Bidu	0	2	1	1	1	5
4	(Paraguay) Ángel Romero	0	0	4	0	1	5
7	(Brazil) Gustavo Henrique	3	1	0	0	0	4
8	(Peru) André Carrillo	1	0	0	2	0	3
8	(Brazil) Igor Coronado	1	0	2	0	0	3
8	(Brazil) Matheuzinho	2	0	0	0	1	3
8	(Brazil) Maycon	3	0	0	0	0	3
8	(Brazil) Raniele	2	0	0	0	1	3
13	(Brazil) Alex Santana	0	0	2	0	0	2
13	(Brazil) André	2	0	0	0	0	2
13	(Brazil) Cacá	2	0	0	0	0	2
13	(Argentina) Rodrigo Garro	0	1	1	0	0	2
13	(Spain) Héctor Hernández	1	1	0	0	0	2
13	(Venezuela) José Andrés Martínez	1	0	1	0	0	2
19	(Brazil) Breno Bidon	1	0	0	0	0	1
19	(Brazil) Charles	1	0	0	0	0	1
19	(Brazil) João Pedro	0	0	1	0	0	1
19	(Brazil) Pedro Raul	0	0	1	0	0	1
19	(Ecuador) Félix Torres	0	0	0	1	0	1
Own goals		2	0	0	0	0	2
Total		42	12	25	6	5	90

=== Assists ===
As of 21 December 2025

Rank	Player	BR	CdB	CP	CL	CS	Total
1	(Netherlands) Memphis Depay	3	0	5	2	0	10
2	(Argentina) Rodrigo Garro	3	1	1	2	0	7
3	(Brazil) Matheuzinho	3	3	0	0	0	6
4	(Brazil) Matheus Bidu	2	0	2	0	0	4
4	(Brazil) Talles Magno	1	2	1	0	0	4
4	(Brazil) Yuri Alberto	2	2	0	0	0	4
7	(Peru) André Carrillo	1	0	0	1	1	3
7	(Paraguay) Ángel Romero	1	0	2	0	0	3
7	(Brazil) Vitinho	3	0	0	0	0	3
10	(Argentina) Fabrizio Angileri	0	0	2	0	0	2
10	(Brazil) Gui Negão	1	1	0	0	0	2
10	(Brazil) Gustavo Henrique	0	1	0	1	0	2
10	(Venezuela) José Andrés Martínez	1	0	1	0	0	2
14	(Brazil) Breno Bidon	1	0	0	0	0	1
14	(Brazil) Charles	0	0	1	0	0	1
14	(Brazil) Dieguinho	1	0	0	0	0	1
14	(Brazil) Giovane	0	0	1	0	0	1
14	(Spain) Héctor Hernández	0	0	0	0	1	1
14	(Brazil) João Pedro	1	0	0	0	0	1
14	(Brazil) Kayke	1	0	0	0	0	1
14	(Brazil) Léo Mana	1	0	0	0	0	1
14	(Brazil) Maycon	0	0	0	0	1	1
14	(Brazil) Raniele	1	0	0	0	0	1
14	(Brazil) Ryan	0	0	1	0	0	1
Total		27	10	17	6	3	63

=== Disciplinary record ===
N	P	Nat.	Name	BR			CdB			CP			CL			CS			Total			Notes
N	P	Nat.	Name	Yellow card	Second yellow card	Red card	Yellow card	Second yellow card	Red card	Yellow card	Second yellow card	Red card	Yellow card	Second yellow card	Red card	Yellow card	Second yellow card	Red card	Yellow card	Second yellow card	Red card	Notes
70	MF	(Venezuela)	José Andrés Martínez	10	1	1				3	1	1	1			1			15	2	2	
3	DF	(Ecuador)	Félix Torres	1						3	1		1			1		1	6	1	1	
11	FW	(Paraguay)	Ángel Romero	4		1	1			1									6		1	
35	MF	(Brazil)	Charles	2		1				1						2			5		1	
27	MF	(Brazil)	Breno Bidon	9	1		2									1			12	1		
9	FW	(Brazil)	Yuri Alberto	3			2			2	1		1			1			9	1		
2	DF	(Brazil)	Matheuzinho	12			3			1						1			17			
14	MF	(Brazil)	Raniele	7			5			2						3			17			
8	MF	(Argentina)	Rodrigo Garro	6			2			1			2						11			
5	DF	(Brazil)	André Ramalho	4			2			3						1			10			
26	DF	(Argentina)	Fabrizio Angileri	4			2			3									9			
13	DF	(Brazil)	Gustavo Henrique	5			2						2						9			
25	DF	(Brazil)	Cacá	4			1			2						1			8			
19	MF	(Peru)	André Carrillo	3			1			1						3			8			
21	DF	(Brazil)	Matheus Bidu	8															8			
10	FW	(Netherlands)	Memphis Depay	4			1			1						1			7			
1	GK	(Brazil)	Hugo Souza	3			2						1						6			
47	DF	(Brazil)	João Pedro	4			1			1									6			
7	MF	(Brazil)	Maycon	4			2												6			
80	MF	(Brazil)	Alex Santana							5									5			
56	FW	(Brazil)	Gui Negão	3			1												4			
43	MF	(Brazil)	Talles Magno	2						1			1						4			
46	DF	(Brazil)	Hugo	1						1			1						3			
37	MF	(Brazil)	Ryan	1						2									3			
77	MF	(Brazil)	Igor Coronado	1						1									2			
29	FW	(Brazil)	Vitinho				2												2			
49	MF	(Brazil)	André				1												1			
33	DF	(Brazil)	Léo Mana													1			1			
32	GK	(Brazil)	Matheus Donelli	1															1			
20	FW	(Brazil)	Pedro Raul							1									1			

Only competitive matches
Ordered by (red card) , (second yellow card) and (yellow card)
(yellow card) = Number of bookings; (second yellow card) = Number of sending offs after a second yellow card; (red card) = Number of sending offs by a direct red card.

== Overview ==
Competition	First match	Last match	Starting round	Final position	Record							
Competition	First match	Last match	Starting round	Final position	Pld	W	D	L	GF	GA	GD	Win %
Série A	30 March 2025	7 December 2025	Matchday 1	13th place	38	12	11	15	42	47	−5	31.58
Copa do Brasil	30 April 2025	21 December 2025	Third round	Winners	10	8	1	1	12	3	+9	80.00
Campeonato Paulista	16 January 2025	27 March 2025	Matchday 1	Winners	16	11	4	1	25	14	+11	68.75
Copa Libertadores	19 February 2025	12 March 2025	Second stage	Third stage	4	2	1	1	6	6	+0	50.00
Copa Sudamericana	2 April 2025	27 May 2025	Group stage	Group stage	6	2	2	2	5	5	+0	33.33
Total					74	35	19	20	90	75	+15	47.30

Last updated: 21 December 2025
Source: Competitions

== Campeonato Brasileiro ==
Pos	Team	Pld	W	D	L	GF	GA	GD	Pts	Qualification or relegation
11	Atlético Mineiro	38	12	12	14	43	44	−1	48	Qualification for Copa Sudamericana group stage
12	Santos	38	12	11	15	45	50	−5	47	Qualification for Copa Sudamericana group stage
13	Corinthians	38	12	11	15	42	47	−5	47	Qualification for Copa Libertadores group stage (Note: Corinthians qualified for the Copa Libertadores group stage by winning the 2025 Copa do Brasil.)
14	Vasco da Gama	38	13	6	19	55	60	−5	45	Qualification for Copa Sudamericana group stage
15	Vitória	38	11	12	15	35	52	−17	45	

Source: CBF
Rules for classification: 1) points; 2) wins; 3) goal difference; 4) goals scored; 5) head-to-head results (only between two teams); 6) fewest red cards; 7) fewest yellow cards; 8) drawing of lots.

=== Results summary ===
Overall								Home						Away					
Pld	W	D	L	GF	GA	GD	Pts	W	D	L	GF	GA	GD	W	D	L	GF	GA	GD
38	12	11	15	42	47	−5	47	8	6	5	27	18	+9	4	5	10	15	29	−14

Last updated: 7 December 2025.
Source: CBF

=== Result by round ===
Round	1	2	3	4	5	6	7	8	9	10	11	12	13	14	15	16	17	18	19	20	21	22	23	24	25	26	27	28	29	30	31	32	33	34	35	36	37	38
Ground	A	H	A	H	H	A	H	A	H	A	H	A	H	A	A	H	A	H	A	H	A	H	A	A	H	A	H	A	H	A	H	A	H	H	A	H	A	H
Result	D	W	L	L	W	L	W	L	W	D	D	D	L	W	L	D	D	D	L	L	W	D	W	L	L	D	W	L	W	W	W	L	L	W	L	D	L	D
Position	8	2	9	14	6	12	8	10	8	8	11	10	11	9	10	11	11	12	13	14	11	12	9	10	13	13	12	13	11	10	10	10	13	10	10	9	10	13
Points	1	4	4	4	7	7	10	10	13	14	15	16	16	19	19	20	21	22	22	22	25	26	29	29	29	30	33	33	36	39	42	42	42	45	45	46	46	47

Updated to match(es) played on 7 December 2025. Source: CBF
A = Away; H = Home; W = Win; D = Draw; L = Loss; P = Postponed

=== Matches ===
30 March 2025 1	Bahia	1–1	Corinthians	Salvador
20:00 UTC−3	Gilberto 45+1'	Report	Hernández 90'	Stadium: Casa de Apostas Arena Fonte Nova; Attendance: 41,898; Referee: Bruno Arleu de Araújo
Note: The match was originally scheduled for 29 March, but it was postponed due to Corinthians' participation in the 2025 Campeonato Paulista finals on 27 March.

5 April 2025 2	Corinthians	3–0	Vasco da Gama	São Paulo
18:30 UTC−3	Yuri Alberto 12'; Depay 27'; João Victor 90+1' (o.g.)	Report		Stadium: Neo Química Arena; Attendance: 43,250; Referee: Anderson Daronco

12 April 2025 3	Palmeiras	2–0	Corinthians	Barueri
18:30 UTC−3	Piquerez 14'; Martínez 19'	Report		Stadium: Arena Barueri (Note: Palmeiras played their home match at Arena Barueri, Barueri instead of their regular stadium Allianz Parque, São Paulo, which hosted a concert.); Attendance: 19,297; Referee: Rafael Klein

16 April 2025 4	Corinthians	0–2	Fluminense	São Paulo
19:30 UTC−3		Report	Renê 63'; Arias 82' (pen.)	Stadium: Neo Química Arena; Attendance: 41,355; Referee: Rodrigo José Pereira de Lima

19 April 2025 5	Corinthians	2–1	Sport Recife	São Paulo
16:00 UTC−3	Depay 46', 62'	Report	Oliveira 45'	Stadium: Neo Química Arena; Attendance: 44,257; Referee: Anderson Daronco

27 April 2025 6	Flamengo	4–0	Corinthians	Rio de Janeiro
16:00 UTC−3	Everton 5'; De Arrascaeta 34'; Pedro 37', 78' (pen.)	Report		Stadium: Maracanã; Attendance: 67,501; Referee: Ramon Abatti Abel

3 May 2025 7	Corinthians	4–2	Internacional	São Paulo
18:30 UTC−3	Yuri Alberto 25', 64', 90+4' (pen.); Coronado 90+13'	Report	Aguirre 38'; Thiago Maia 42'	Stadium: Neo Química Arena; Attendance: 44,931; Referee: Paulo Cesar Zanovelli

10 May 2025 8	Mirassol	2–1	Corinthians	Mirassol
18:30 UTC−3	Edson Carioca 50'; Gabriel 65'	Report	Cacá 45+7'	Stadium: Estádio José Maria de Campos Maia; Attendance: 11,584; Referee: João Vitor Gobi

18 May 2025 9	Corinthians	1–0	Santos	São Paulo
16:00 UTC−3	Yuri Alberto 66'	Report		Stadium: Neo Química Arena; Attendance: 46,932; Referee: Raphael Claus

24 May 2025 10	Atlético Mineiro	0–0	Corinthians	Belo Horizonte
21:00 UTC−3		Report		Stadium: Arena MRV; Attendance: 38,154; Referee: Rafael Klein

1 June 2025 11	Corinthians	0–0	Vitória	São Paulo
18:30 UTC−3		Report		Stadium: Neo Química Arena; Attendance: 44,943; Referee: Felipe Fernandes de Lima

12 June 2025 12	Grêmio	1–1	Corinthians	Porto Alegre
20:00 UTC−3	Braithwaite 29'	Report	Bidon 36'	Stadium: Arena do Grêmio; Attendance: 20,465; Referee: Davi de Oliveira Lacerda

13 July 2025 13	Corinthians	1–2	Red Bull Bragantino	São Paulo
19:00 UTC−3	Cacá 52'	Report	Sasha 31' (pen.); Borbas 90+7'	Stadium: Neo Química Arena; Attendance: 34,211; Referee: Bruno Arleu de Araújo

16 July 2025 14	Ceará	0–1	Corinthians	Fortaleza
19:30 UTC−3		Report	Talles Magno 71'	Stadium: Arena Castelão; Attendance: 35,410; Referee: Paulo Cesar Zanovelli

19 July 2025 15	São Paulo	2–0	Corinthians	São Paulo
21:00 UTC−3	Luciano 32', 35'	Report		Stadium: MorumBIS; Attendance: 47,964; Referee: Anderson Daronco

23 July 2025 16	Corinthians	0–0	Cruzeiro	São Paulo
19:30 UTC−3		Report		Stadium: Neo Química Arena; Attendance: 31,541; Referee: Alex Gomes Stefano

26 July 2025 17	Botafogo	1–1	Corinthians	Rio de Janeiro
18:30 UTC−3	Arthur Cabral 24'	Report	Depay 83'	Stadium: Estádio Olímpico Nilton Santos; Attendance: 31,402; Referee: Rodrigo José Pereira de Lima

3 August 2025 18	Corinthians	1–1	Fortaleza	São Paulo
16:00 UTC−3	Carrillo 90+4'	Report	Breno Lopes 6'	Stadium: Neo Química Arena; Attendance: 34,805; Referee: Felipe Fernandes de Lima

11 August 2025 19	Juventude	2–1	Corinthians	Caxias do Sul
20:00 UTC−3	Gabriel Taliari 27'; Matheus Babi 81'	Report	Matheuzinho 90'	Stadium: Estádio Alfredo Jaconi; Attendance: 8,679; Referee: Lucas Casagrande

16 August 2025 20	Corinthians	1–2	Bahia	São Paulo
21:00 UTC−3	Gui Negão 31'	Report	Michel Araújo 2'; Willian José 43' (pen.)	Stadium: Neo Química Arena; Attendance: 38,668; Referee: Paulo Cesar Zanovelli

24 August 2025 21	Vasco da Gama	2–3	Corinthians	Rio de Janeiro
16:00 UTC−3	Vegetti 59' (pen.); Rayan 90+6'	Report	Maycon 21'; Gui Negão 69'; Gustavo Henrique 85'	Stadium: Estádio São Januário; Attendance: 20,329; Referee: Rodrigo José Pereira de Lima

31 August 2025 22	Corinthians	1–1	Palmeiras	São Paulo
18:30 UTC−3	Piquerez 26' (o.g.)	Report	Vitor Roque 14' (pen.)	Stadium: Neo Química Arena; Attendance: 44,969; Referee: Ramon Abatti Abel

13 September 2025 23	Fluminense	0–1	Corinthians	Rio de Janeiro
21:00 UTC−3		Report	Matheuzinho 73'	Stadium: Maracanã; Attendance: 21,091; Referee: Felipe Fernandes de Lima

21 September 2025 24	Sport Recife	1–0	Corinthians	Recife
17:30 UTC−3	Matheusinho 49'	Report		Stadium: Ilha do Retiro; Attendance: 26,504; Referee: Sávio Pereira Sampaio

28 September 2025 25	Corinthians	1–2	Flamengo	São Paulo
20:30 UTC−3	Yuri Alberto 47'	Report	De Arrascaeta 55'; Luiz Araújo 87'	Stadium: Neo Química Arena; Attendance: 40,629; Referee: Wilton Pereira Sampaio

1 October 2025 26	Internacional	1–1	Corinthians	Porto Alegre
19:30 UTC−3	Carbonero 90+12' (pen.)	Report	Gui Negão 10'	Stadium: Estádio Beira-Rio; Attendance: 12,825; Referee: Rodrigo José Pereira de Lima

4 October 2025 27	Corinthians	3–0	Mirassol	São Paulo
21:00 UTC−3	Maycon 18' (pen.); Yuri Alberto 72'; André 90+5'	Report		Stadium: Neo Química Arena; Attendance: 38,654; Referee: Felipe Fernandes de Lima

15 October 2025 28	Santos	3–1	Corinthians	Santos
21:30 UTC−3	Zé Rafael 4'; Barreal 39'; Rollheiser 55' (pen.)	Report	Raniele 58'	Stadium: Vila Belmiro; Attendance: 13,123; Referee: Flávio Rodrigues de Souza

18 October 2025 29	Corinthians	1–0	Atlético Mineiro	São Paulo
18:30 UTC−3	Maycon 49'	Report		Stadium: Neo Química Arena; Attendance: 39,640; Referee: Alex Gomes Stefano

25 October 2025 30	Vitória	0–1	Corinthians	Salvador
16:00 UTC−3		Report	Charles 87'	Stadium: Barradão; Attendance: 28,070; Referee: Wilton Pereira Sampaio

2 November 2025 31	Corinthians	2–0	Grêmio	São Paulo
16:00 UTC−3	Gustavo Henrique 16'; Depay 80' (pen.)	Report		Stadium: Neo Química Arena; Attendance: 42,081; Referee: Davi de Oliveira Lacerda

5 November 2025 32	Red Bull Bragantino	2–1	Corinthians	Bragança Paulista
19:00 UTC−3	Sasha 45+3' (pen.); Pitta 90+2'	Report	Yuri Alberto 66'	Stadium: Estádio Cícero de Souza Marques (Note: Red Bull Bragantino played their home match at Estádio Cícero de Souza Marques, Bragança Paulista instead of their regular stadium Estádio Nabi Abi Chedid, Bragança Paulista, which will be demolished in order to build a new stadium.); Attendance: 8,250; Referee: Edina Alves Batista

9 November 2025 33	Corinthians	0–1	Ceará	São Paulo
16:00 UTC−3		Report	Galeano 31'	Stadium: Neo Química Arena; Attendance: 39,926; Referee: Felipe Fernandes de Lima

20 November 2025 34	Corinthians	3–1	São Paulo	São Paulo
19:30 UTC−3	Yuri Alberto 31' (pen.), 89'; Depay 84'	Report	Tapia 54'	Stadium: Neo Química Arena; Attendance: 46,154; Referee: Anderson Daronco

23 November 2025 35	Cruzeiro	3–0	Corinthians	Belo Horizonte
20:30 UTC−3	Kaio Jorge 26', 49'; Arroyo 64'	Report		Stadium: Mineirão; Attendance: 30,673; Referee: Alex Gomes Stefano

30 November 2025 36	Corinthians	2–2	Botafogo	São Paulo
16:00 UTC−3	Raniele 7'; Gustavo Henrique 82'	Report	Cuiabano 60'; Barrera 66'	Stadium: Neo Química Arena; Attendance: 37,959; Referee: Jonathan Benkenstein Pinheiro

3 December 2025 37	Fortaleza	2–1	Corinthians	Fortaleza
19:00 UTC−3	Pochettino 8'; Herrera 58'	Report	André 70'	Stadium: Arena Castelão; Attendance: 56,014; Referee: Sávio Pereira Sampaio

7 December 2025 38	Corinthians	1–1	Juventude	São Paulo
16:00 UTC−3	Martínez 23'	Report	Edison Negueba 87'	Stadium: Neo Química Arena; Attendance: 31,003; Referee: Felipe Fernandes de Lima

== Copa do Brasil ==
=== Preliminary stages ===
30 April 2025 Third round	Novorizontino	0–1	Corinthians	Novo Horizonte
21:30 UTC−3		Report	Hernández 10'	Stadium: Estádio Doutor Jorge Ismael de Biasi; Attendance: 7,521; Referee: Wilton Pereira Sampaio

21 May 2025 Third round	Corinthians	1–0 (2–0 agg.)	Novorizontino	São Paulo
21:30 UTC−3	Yuri Alberto 90+3'	Report		Stadium: Neo Química Arena; Attendance: 40,721; Referee: Davi de Oliveira Lacerda

=== Knockout stages ===
30 July 2025 Round of 16	Corinthians	1–0	Palmeiras	São Paulo
21:30 UTC−3	Depay 79'	Report		Stadium: Neo Química Arena; Attendance: 46,023; Referee: Wilton Pereira Sampaio

6 August 2025 Round of 16	Palmeiras	0–2 (0–3 agg.)	Corinthians	São Paulo
21:30 UTC−3		Report	Matheus Bidu 43'; Gustavo Henrique 59'	Stadium: Allianz Parque; Attendance: 41,468; Referee: Anderson Daronco
Note: The match was originally scheduled for 7 August, but it was anticipated due to table adjustments.

27 August 2025 Quarter-finals	Athletico Paranaense	0–1	Corinthians	Curitiba
21:30 UTC−3		Report	Gui Negão 58'	Stadium: Arena da Baixada; Attendance: 40,236; Referee: Wilton Pereira Sampaio

10 September 2025 Quarter-finals	Corinthians	2–0 (3–0 agg.)	Athletico Paranaense	São Paulo
21:30 UTC−3	Garro 43'; Gui Negão 63'	Report		Stadium: Neo Química Arena; Attendance: 41,839; Referee: Davi de Oliveira Lacerda
Note: The match was originally scheduled for 11 September, but it was anticipated due to table adjustments.

10 December 2025 Semi-finals	Cruzeiro	0–1	Corinthians	Belo Horizonte
21:30 UTC−3		Report	Depay 22'	Stadium: Mineirão; Attendance: 59,052; Referee: Anderson Daronco

14 December 2025 Semi-finals	Corinthians	1–2 (2–2 agg.) (5–4 p)	Cruzeiro	São Paulo
18:00 UTC−3	Matheus Bidu 55'	Report	Arroyo 40', 50'	Stadium: Neo Química Arena; Attendance: 47,520; Referee: Rodrigo José Pereira de Lima
	Penalties
	Yuri Alberto (penalty missed); Depay (penalty scored); Garro (penalty scored); Vitinho (penalty scored); Gustavo Henrique (penalty scored); Bidon (penalty scored)		(penalty scored) Matheus Pereira; (penalty scored) Wanderson; (penalty scored) William; (penalty scored) Lucas Silva; (penalty missed) Gabriel; (penalty missed) Walace

17 December 2025 Finals	Corinthians	0–0	Vasco da Gama	São Paulo
21:30 UTC−3		Report		Stadium: Neo Química Arena; Attendance: 47,339; Referee: Rafael Klein

21 December 2025 Finals	Vasco da Gama	1–2 (1–2 agg.)	Corinthians	Rio de Janeiro
18:00 UTC−3	Moreira 41'	Report	Yuri Alberto 18'; Depay 62'	Stadium: Maracanã; Attendance: 67,111; Referee: Wilton Pereira Sampaio

== Campeonato Paulista ==
For the 2025 Campeonato Paulista, the 16 teams were divided in four groups of 4 teams (A, B, C, D). They faced all teams, except those that were in their own group, with the top two teams from each group qualifying for the quarterfinals. The two overall worst teams were relegated.

=== First stage ===
Pos	Team	Pld	W	D	L	GF	GA	GD	Pts	Qualification
1	Corinthians	12	8	3	1	20	13	+7	27	Knockout stage
2	Mirassol	12	5	1	6	21	21	0	16	Knockout stage
3	Botafogo-SP	12	2	5	5	8	13	−5	11	
4	Inter de Limeira (R)	12	0	7	5	9	19	−10	7	Relegation to Série A2

Source: Soccerway
(R) Relegated

16 January 2025 1	Red Bull Bragantino	1–2	Corinthians	Bragança Paulista
19:30 UTC−3	Lucas Evangelista 9'	Report	Talles Magno 50'; Pedro Raul 79'	Stadium: Estádio Nabi Abi Chedid; Attendance: 10,289; Referee: Matheus Delgado Candançan

19 January 2025 2	Corinthians	2–1	Velo Clube	São Paulo
18:30 UTC−3	Coronado 22'; Talles Magno 73'	Report	Daniel Amorim 67'	Stadium: Neo Química Arena; Attendance: 42,508; Referee: Fabiano Monteiro dos Santos

22 January 2025 3	Corinthians	2–1	Água Santa	São Paulo
19:30 UTC−3	Alex Santana 8'; João Pedro 18'	Report	Netinho 23'	Stadium: Neo Química Arena; Attendance: 41,579; Referee: Lucas Canetto Bellote

26 January 2025 4	São Paulo	3–1	Corinthians	São Paulo
19:30 UTC−3	Lucas Moura 49', 63'; Oscar 56'	Report	Martínez 62'	Stadium: MorumBIS; Attendance: 54,855; Referee: Flávio Rodrigues de Souza
Note: The match was originally scheduled for 18:30 local time, but it was delayed to 19:30 due to heavy rain.

29 January 2025 5	Ponte Preta	0–1	Corinthians	Campinas
20:15 UTC−3		Report	Talles Magno 69'	Stadium: Estádio Moisés Lucarelli; Attendance: 8,896; Referee: Luiz Flávio de Oliveira
Note: The match was originally scheduled for 19:45 local time, but it was delayed to 20:15 due to heavy rain.

1 February 2025 6	Corinthians	2–1	Noroeste	São Paulo
18:30 UTC−3	Coronado 34'; Talles Magno 75'	Report	Pedro Felipe 90'	Stadium: Neo Química Arena; Attendance: 43,150; Referee: João Vitor Gobi

3 February 2025 11	Novorizontino	0–1	Corinthians	Novo Horizonte
21:30 UTC−3		Report	Alex Santana 66'	Stadium: Estádio Doutor Jorge Ismael de Biasi; Attendance: 9,310; Referee: Lucas Canetto Bellote
Note: The match was originally scheduled for 19 February, but it was anticipated due to Corinthians' participation in the 2025 Copa Libertadores second stage on the same date.

6 February 2025 7	Palmeiras	1–1	Corinthians	São Paulo
20:30 UTC−3	Maurício 9'	Report	Yuri Alberto 43'	Stadium: Allianz Parque; Attendance: 32,029; Referee: Raphael Claus
Note: The match was originally scheduled for 20:00 local time, but it was delayed to 20:30 due to heavy rain.

9 February 2025 8	Corinthians	2–0	São Bernardo	São Paulo
20:30 UTC−3	Romero 90+4'; Depay 90+9'	Report		Stadium: Neo Química Arena; Attendance: 42,352; Referee: Luiz Flávio de Oliveira

12 February 2025 9	Corinthians	2–1	Santos	São Paulo
21:35 UTC−3	Yuri Alberto 17', 44'	Report	Guilherme 79'	Stadium: Neo Química Arena; Attendance: 48,169; Referee: Edina Alves Batista

15 February 2025 10	Portuguesa	2–2	Corinthians	São Paulo
18:30 UTC−3	Jajá 39'; Everton Maceió 74'	Report	Matheus Bidu 53'; Talles Magno 65' (pen.)	Stadium: Mercado Livre Arena Pacaembu (Note: Portuguesa was expected to play their home match at Arena BRB Mané Garrincha, Brasília, Distrito Federal instead of their regular stadium Estádio do Canindé, São Paulo. However, they later opted to return to São Paulo and play the match at Mercado Livre Arena Pacaembu.); Attendance: 17,087; Referee: Daiane Muniz

23 February 2025 12	Corinthians	2–2	Guarani	São Paulo
18:30 UTC−3	Romero 17', 66'	Report	Rafael Bilú 43'; João Marcelo 57'	Stadium: Neo Química Arena; Attendance: 44,799; Referee: Murilo Tarrega Victor

=== Knockout stages ===
2 March 2025 Quarter-finals	Corinthians	2–0	Mirassol	São Paulo
18:30 UTC−3	Romero 22'; Depay 76'	Report		Stadium: Neo Química Arena; Attendance: 44,436; Referee: Daiane Muniz

9 March 2025 Semi-finals	Corinthians	2–1	Santos	São Paulo
18:30 UTC−3	Yuri Alberto 12'; Garro 56'	Report	Tiquinho Soares 38'	Stadium: Neo Química Arena; Attendance: 48,046; Referee: Matheus Delgado Candançan

16 March 2025 Finals	Palmeiras	0–1	Corinthians	São Paulo
18:30 UTC−3		Report	Yuri Alberto 58'	Stadium: Allianz Parque; Attendance: 40,992; Referee: Raphael Claus

27 March 2025 Finals	Corinthians	0–0 (1–0 agg.)	Palmeiras	São Paulo
21:35 UTC−3		Report		Stadium: Neo Química Arena; Attendance: 48,932; Referee: Matheus Delgado Candançan

== Copa Libertadores ==
=== Preliminary stages ===
19 February 2025 Second stage	Universidad Central (Venezuela)	1–1	(Brazil) Corinthians	Caracas, Venezuela
20:30 UTC−4	João Pedro 75' (o.g.)	Report	Carrillo 36'	Stadium: Estadio Olímpico de la UCV; Attendance: 4,732; Referee: Gustavo Tejera (Uruguay)

26 February 2025 Second stage	Corinthians (Brazil)	3–2 (4–3 agg.)	(Venezuela) Universidad Central	São Paulo, Brazil
21:30 UTC−3	Yuri Alberto 3', 89'; Matheus Bidu 40'	Report	Cuesta 6'; A. Martínez 45+1'	Stadium: Neo Química Arena; Attendance: 44,964; Referee: Wilmar Roldán (Colombia)

5 March 2025 Third stage	Barcelona (Ecuador)	3–0	(Brazil) Corinthians	Guayaquil, Ecuador
21:30 UTC−3	Corozo 45+2' (pen.), 84'; Rivero 80'	Report		Stadium: Estadio Monumental Banco Pichincha; Attendance: 16,188; Referee: Darío Herrera (Argentina)

12 March 2025 Third stage	Corinthians (Brazil)	2–0 (2–3 agg.)	(Ecuador) Barcelona	São Paulo, Brazil
21:30 UTC−3	Torres 40'; Carrillo 84'	Report		Stadium: Neo Química Arena; Attendance: 44,877; Referee: Esteban Ostojich (Uruguay)

== Copa Sudamericana ==
=== Group stage ===
Pos	Team	Pld	W	D	L	GF	GA	GD	Pts	Qualification	HUR	AME	COR	RCM
1	(Argentina) Huracán	6	4	2	0	11	2	+9	14	Advance to round of 16	—	0–0	1–0	5–0
2	(Colombia) América de Cali	6	1	5	0	6	4	+2	8	Advance to knockout round play-offs	0–0	—	1–1	1–1
3	(Brazil) Corinthians	6	2	2	2	5	5	0	8		1–2	1–1	—	1–0
4	(Uruguay) Racing	6	0	1	5	3	14	−11	1		1–3	1–3	0–1	—

Source: CONMEBOL
Rules for classification: 1) Points; 2) Goal difference; 3) Goals scored; 4) Away goals scored; 5) CONMEBOL ranking.

2 April 2025 1	Corinthians (Brazil)	1–2	(Argentina) Huracán	São Paulo, Brazil
19:00 UTC−3	Raniele 13'	Report	Sequeira 6', 37'	Stadium: Neo Química Arena; Attendance: 40,759; Referee: Cristian Garay (Chile)

8 April 2025 2	América de Cali (Colombia)	1–1	(Brazil) Corinthians	Cali, Colombia
19:30 UTC−5	Ramos 24'	Report	Matheuzinho 88'	Stadium: Estadio Olímpico Pascual Guerrero; Attendance: 32,744; Referee: Jesús Valenzuela (Venezuela)

24 April 2025 3	Corinthians (Brazil)	1–0	(Uruguay) Racing	São Paulo, Brazil
19:00 UTC−3	Romero 52'	Report		Stadium: Neo Química Arena; Attendance: 39,074; Referee: Guillermo Guerrero (Ecuador)

6 May 2025 4	Corinthians (Brazil)	1–1	(Colombia) América de Cali	São Paulo, Brazil
21:30 UTC−3	Depay 20'	Report	Navarro 46'	Stadium: Neo Química Arena; Attendance: 39,846; Referee: Juan Gabriel Benítez (Paraguay)

15 May 2025 5	Racing (Uruguay)	0–1	(Brazil) Corinthians	Montevideo, Uruguay
19:00 UTC−3		Report	Matheus Bidu 74'	Stadium: Estadio Centenario (Note: Racing played their home match at Estadio Centenario, Montevideo instead of their regular stadium Estadio Osvaldo Roberto, Montevideo, which did not meet CONMEBOL requirements.); Attendance: 750; Referee: José Cabero (Chile)

27 May 2025 6	Huracán (Argentina)	1–0	(Brazil) Corinthians	Buenos Aires, Argentina
21:30 UTC−3	Watson 47'	Report		Stadium: Estadio Tomás Adolfo Ducó; Attendance: 11,707; Referee: Gery Vargas (Bolivia)

== See also ==
- List of SC Corinthians Paulista seasons
