= Luiz Eduardo =

Luiz Eduardo may refer to:

- Luiz Eduardo (footballer, born 1985), Luiz Eduardo Azevedo Dantas, Brazilian football forward
- Luiz Eduardo (footballer, born 1987), Luiz Eduardo Rodrigues, Brazilian football centre-back
- Luiz Eduardo (footballer, born 1993), Luiz Eduardo Felix da Costa, Brazilian football centre-back for Ska Brazil
- Luiz Eduardo (footballer, born 2007), Luiz Eduardo Amorim de Souza, Brazilian football attacking midfielder for Corinthians

== See also ==
- Luis Eduardo (born 2008), Luis Eduardo Guedes de Souza, Brazilian football centre-back for Grêmio
