= Dieguinho =

Dieguinho may refer to:

- Dieguinho (futsal player) (born 1989), Brazilian futsal player
- Dieguinho (footballer, born 1989), Brazilian footballer
- Dieguinho (footballer, born 1992), Brazilian footballer
- Dieguinho (footballer, born 2007), Brazilian footballer
- Jackson Diego Ibraim Fagundes (born 1995), sometimes known as Dieguinho, Brazilian footballer
