= Léo Mana =

Brazilian footballer

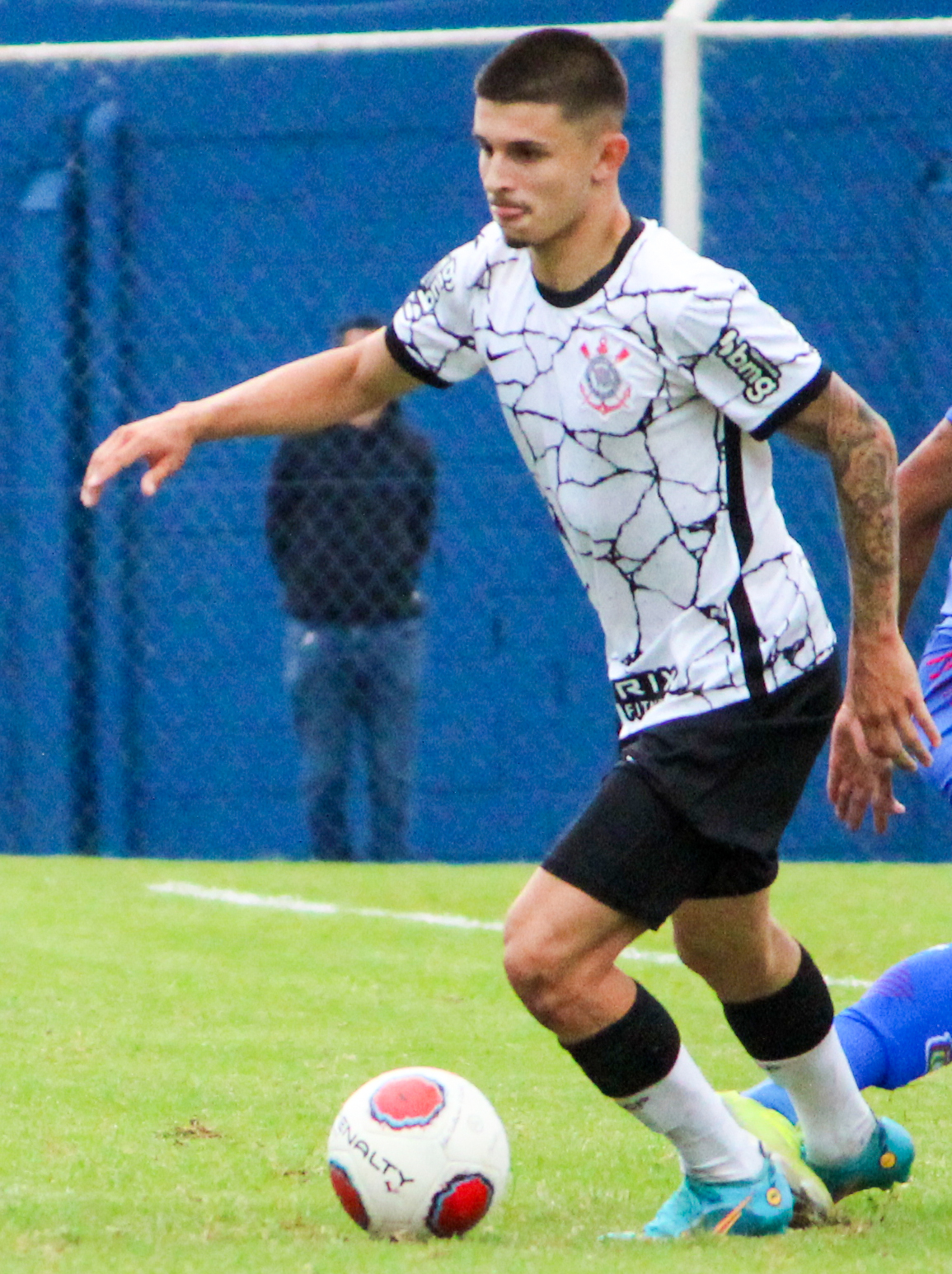
- Léo Mana with Corinthians in 2022

Personal information
- Full name: Leonardo Mana Hernandes
- Date of birth: 6 April 2004 (age 22)
- Place of birth: São Paulo, Brazil
- Position: Right back

Team information
- Current team: Criciúma
- Number: 2

Youth career
- 2014–2022: Corinthians

Senior career*
Years	Team	Apps	(Gls)
2022–	Corinthians	24	(0)
2025-	→ Criciúma (loan)	14	(0)
- * Club domestic league appearances and goals as of 15 July 2026 (UTC)

Leonardo Mana Hernandes (born 6 April 2004), known as Léo Mana, is a Brazilian footballer who plays as a right back for Criciúma, on loan from Corinthians.

== Club career ==
Born in São Paulo, Léo Mana joined Corinthians' youth setup in 2014, aged ten. On 7 July 2021, he signed his first professional contract with the club, until 2024.

Léo Mana made his first team – and Série A – debut on 18 September 2022, starting in a 1–0 away loss against América Mineiro.

On 14 August 2025, it was announced that Mana would leave Corinthians to go on loan to Criciuma for 12 months.

== Honours ==
Corinthians

- Campeonato Paulista: 2025

== Career statistics ==
As of 17 May 2026

Club	Season	League			State League		Cup		Continental		Other		Total	
Club	Season	Division	Apps	Goals	Apps	Goals	Apps	Goals	Apps	Goals	Apps	Goals	Apps	Goals
Corinthians	2022	Série A	1	0	—		—		—		—		1	0
Corinthians	2023	Série A	3	0	—		—		3 (Note: Appearance(s) in Copa Libertadores and Copa Sudamericana)	0	—		6	0
Corinthians	2024	Série A	5	0	3	0	1	0	3	0	—		6	0
Corinthians	2025	Série A	4	0	8	0	—		2	0	—		14	0
Total			13	0	11	0	1	0	8	0	—		27	0
Criciúma	2025	Série B	6	0	—		—		—		—		6	0
Criciúma	2026	Série B	8	0	0	0	0	0	0	0	0	0	8	0
Total			14	0	0	0	0	0	0	0	0	0	14	0
Career total			27	0	11	0	1	0	8	0	0	0	41	0
