= Gui Negão =

Brazilian footballer (born 2007)

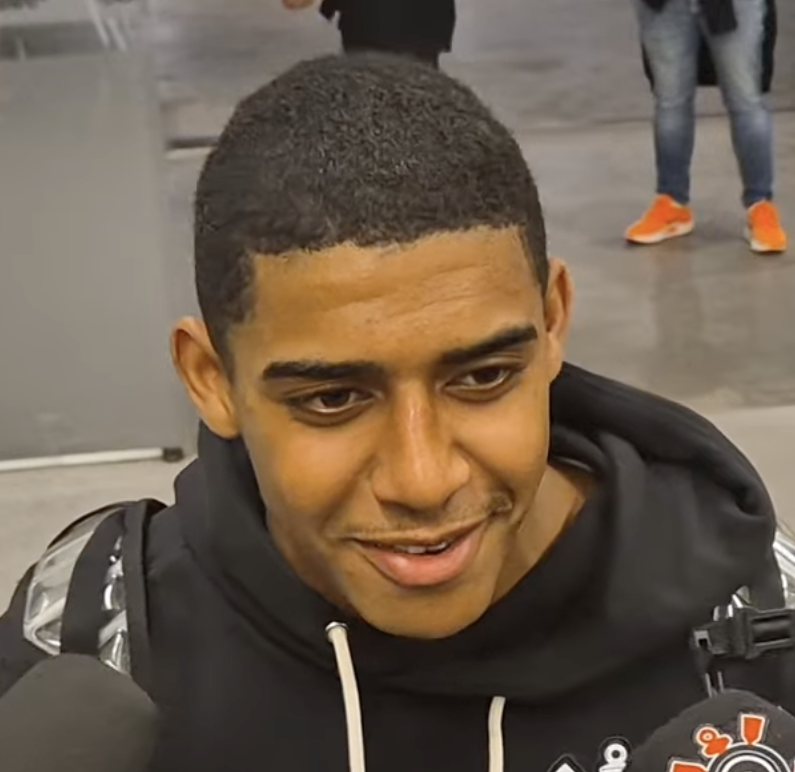
- Gui Negão during a post-match interview as a Corinthians player in 2025

Personal information
- Full name: Guilherme William Silva Inácio
- Date of birth: 6 February 2007 (age 19)
- Place of birth: São Paulo, Brazil
- Height: 1.89 m (6 ft 2 in)
- Position: Striker

Team information
- Current team: Corinthians
- Number: 56

Youth career
- 2016–2025: Corinthians

Senior career*
Years	Team	Apps	(Gls)
2025–	Corinthians	43	(5)

International career
2024	Brazil U17	2	(1)
- * Club domestic league appearances and goals as of 24 October 2026 (BRT)

Guilherme William Silva Inácio (born 6 February 2007), known as Gui Negão ("Big Black Gui"), is a Brazilian footballer who plays mainly as a striker for Corinthians.

== Club career ==
Born in São Paulo and raised in the district of Itaquera, Gui Negão joined Corinthians' youth categories at the age of nine. On 17 May 2024, he renewed his contract with the club until 2027.

Gui Negão made his first team – and Série A – debut on 1 June 2025, coming on as a late substitute for Memphis Depay in a 0–0 home draw against Vitória. He scored his first professional goal on 16 August, netting the equalizer in a 2–1 home loss to Bahia.

In the following five matches, Gui Negão profitted from Yuri Alberto's injury and was a starter in all five, scoring three goals. On 30 August 2025, he renewed his contract with Timão until 2030.

== International career ==
In June 2024, Gui Negão was called up to the Brazil national under-17 team (being called "Guilherme Silva"). He played for the nation in the Cascais Luso Cup, scoring once in the competition.

== Career statistics ==
As of match played 24 October 2026

Club	Season	League			State League		Copa do Brasil		Continental		Other		Total	
Club	Season	Division	Apps	Goals	Apps	Goals	Apps	Goals	Apps	Goals	Apps	Goals	Apps	Goals
Corinthians	2025	Série A	22	3	—		2	2	—		—		24	5
Corinthians	2026	Série A	14	1	7	1	1	0	1	0	0	0	23	2
Total			36	4	7	1	3	2	1	0	0	0	47	7

== Honours ==
Corinthians U17

- Campeonato Paulista Sub-17: 2023

Corinthians

- Copa do Brasil: 2025
- Supercopa do Brasil: 2026

Brazil U17

- Cascais Luso Cup: 2024

Individual

- Troféu Mesa Redonda Breakthrough Player: 2025
