= Andrés Gómez (footballer) =

Colombian footballer (born 2002)

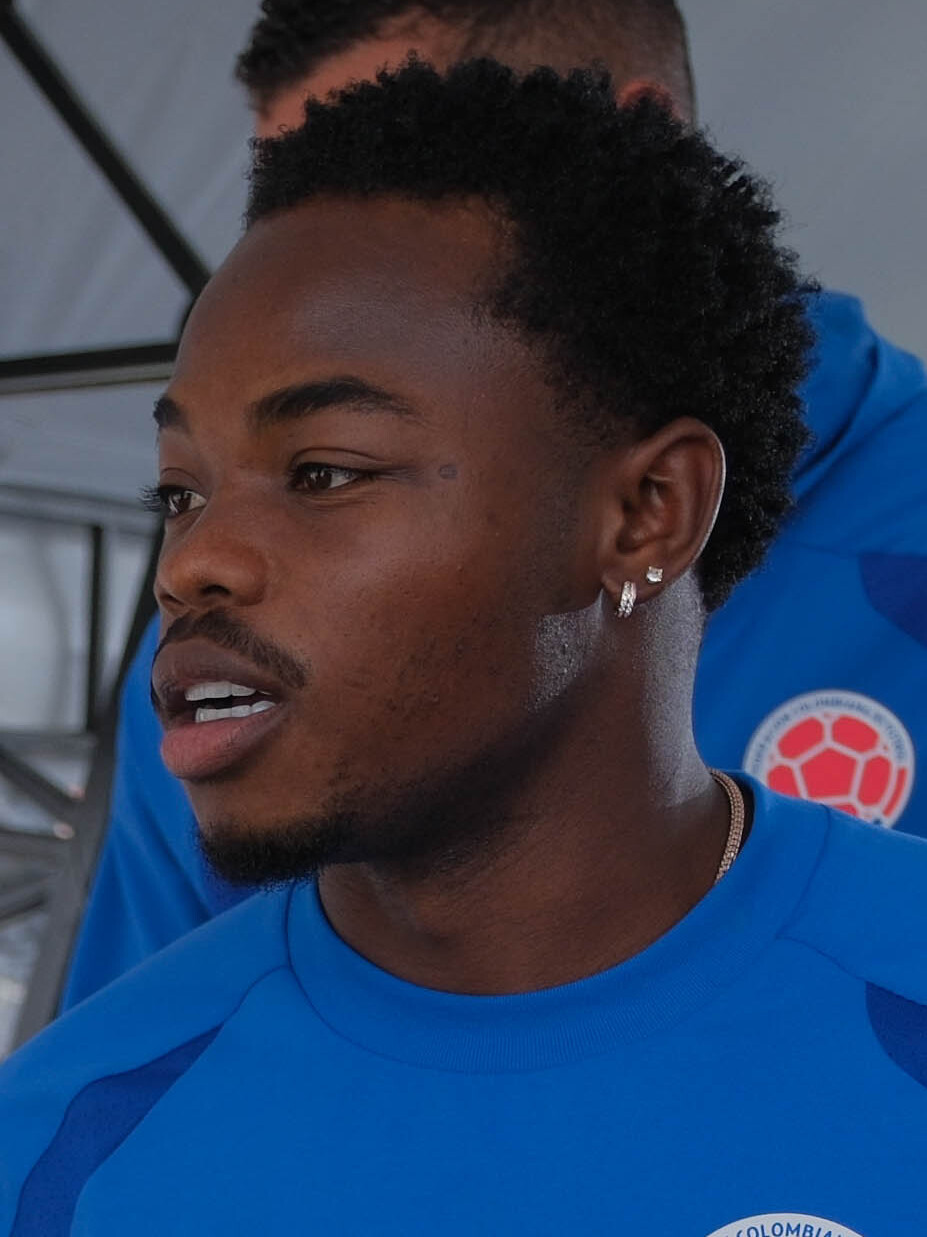
- Gómez with Colombia in 2026

Personal information
- Full name: Carlos Andrés Gómez Hinestroza
- Date of birth: 12 September 2002 (age 24)
- Place of birth: Quibdó, Colombia
- Height: 1.71 m (5 ft 7 in)
- Positions: Winger; forward

Team information
- Current team: Vasco da Gama
- Number: 11

Youth career
- 2020–2021: Millonarios

Senior career*
Years	Team	Apps	(Gls)
2021–2023	Millonarios	49	(9)
2023–2024	Real Salt Lake	53	(14)
2024–2026	Rennes	17	(3)
2025–2026	→ Vasco da Gama (loan)	18	(1)
2026–	Vasco da Gama	33	(6)

International career^{‡}
2023–	Colombia	12	(2)
- * Club domestic league appearances and goals as of 19 September 2026 ‡ National team caps and goals as of 6 October 2026

Carlos Andrés Gómez Hinestroza (born 12 September 2002) is a Colombian professional footballer who plays as a winger or forward for Campeonato Brasileiro Série A club Vasco da Gama and the Colombia national team.

Gómez came through the youth ranks of Millonarios, with whom he won the 2022 Copa Colombia and finished as the competition's top scorer. In January 2023 he joined Major League Soccer club Real Salt Lake for a club-record fee, and scored 13 goals in the 2024 season before being sold to Ligue 1 club Rennes in August 2024 for a reported fee of $11 million. After one season in France, he joined Vasco da Gama on loan in August 2025, reached the final of the 2025 Copa do Brasil, and signed permanently in January 2026.

Gómez made his senior debut in December 2023 against Venezuela and scored his first goal for Colombia that same month in a friendly against Mexico. He was part of the country's squad at the 2026 FIFA World Cup.

== Early life ==
Gómez was born in Quibdó, the capital of the Chocó Department, one of six children, and grew up in the city's deprived Zona Norte. He began playing seriously at around the age of nine with Real Quibdó Fútbol Club, where one of the coaches who discovered him recalled that he first arrived without football boots. He represented Chocó in national youth tournaments, and in late 2020 he joined Millonarios, having initially been trialled as a full-back. He later said that he left Colombia for the United States in order to buy a house for his mother.

== Club career ==
=== Millonarios ===
After being moved from full-back to the wing by the club's youth coaches, Gómez made his professional debut for Millonarios on 14 November 2021, coming on for the final minutes of a 1–1 draw with Alianza Petrolera in the Categoría Primera A. He scored his first goal on 1 May 2022, also providing an assist, in a 2–1 away win over Patriotas Boyacá in Tunja.

Gómez became a regular during the 2022 season, and in September scored braces in consecutive matches, the second against Santa Fe in the Bogotá derby. He scored three goals in the 2022 Copa Colombia, finishing as the competition's top scorer, and started the second leg of the final, in which Millonarios beat Junior 2–0 at the Estadio El Campín to win the title and qualify for the Copa Libertadores.

In December 2022, Brazilian clubs Red Bull Bragantino and Bahia were reported to be interested in signing him, but negotiations with Bragantino broke down over the value and structure of the offer. He left Millonarios having scored 12 goals in 58 appearances.

=== Real Salt Lake ===
On 10 January 2023, Gómez joined Major League Soccer club Real Salt Lake on a five-year contract as a U22 Initiative signing, for a fee that broke the club's transfer record; MLSsoccer.com reported the fee as $4 million. He made his debut as a substitute in a 2–1 away win over the Vancouver Whitecaps on 25 February, and scored his first MLS goal on 22 April in a 3–1 win over the San Jose Earthquakes, after which head coach Pablo Mastroeni said Gómez had "all the tools to be world-class". He finished his first season with one goal and six assists in 30 appearances.

Gómez broke out in the 2024 season. In the home opener on 2 March, he scored twice and provided an assist in a 3–0 win over Los Angeles FC played in near-blizzard conditions. He scored two more braces in wins over the Colorado Rapids and Sporting Kansas City, and was named to the MLS Team of the Matchday six times during the season. He left the club in August having scored 13 goals and provided nine assists in 2024, and 15 goals in 65 appearances overall.

=== Rennes ===
On 17 August 2024, Gómez joined Ligue 1 club Rennes on a five-year contract, for a reported fee of $11 million that could rise to $13 million with add-ons. After three substitute appearances, he made his first start on 25 October against Le Havre and scored the only goal of the match, ending a four-match winless run for Rennes. In a season in which Rennes changed head coach twice, from Julien Stéphan to Jorge Sampaoli and then Habib Beye, he was used mainly as a substitute, scoring three goals in 19 appearances.

=== Vasco da Gama ===
On 14 August 2025, Gómez joined Série A club Vasco da Gama on a season-long loan with an option to buy. Under head coach Fernando Diniz, he became a key player in the final weeks of the season, and was named man of the match in the 2025 Copa do Brasil semi-final against Fluminense. In the final against Corinthians, he assisted Nuno Moreira's equaliser in the second leg at the Maracanã on 21 December, but Vasco lost 2–1 on aggregate.

On 21 January 2026, Vasco signed Gómez permanently, agreeing a contract until 2031. Lance! reported that the club paid €4.5 million for 60% of his economic rights. On 18 April, he scored the winning goal against São Paulo in the Série A, and in the quarter-finals of the 2026 Copa do Brasil he scored in both legs against Vitória as Vasco won 3–0 on aggregate. He also helped Vasco reach the semi-finals of the 2026 Copa Sudamericana, coming on as a substitute in the 2–0 quarter-final win over Santa Fe.

== International career ==
Gómez made his first appearance for Colombia's senior team on 10 December 2023, starting in a 1–0 friendly win over Venezuela's under-23 side in Fort Lauderdale. Six days later, he came on as a substitute against Mexico at the Los Angeles Memorial Coliseum and scored the winning goal in stoppage time of a 3–2 win. He was not selected for the 2024 Copa América squad.

On 15 November 2024, Gómez made his World Cup qualifying debut as a substitute away to Uruguay at the Estadio Centenario, and scored a stoppage-time equaliser before Manuel Ugarte won the match 3–2 for the hosts. On 25 May 2026, he was named in Néstor Lorenzo's 26-man squad for the 2026 FIFA World Cup, and made one appearance at the tournament, as a late substitute in the 3–1 win over Uzbekistan on 17 June. He was recalled in September 2026 for friendlies against Mexico, Paraguay and Peru.

== Style of play ==
Gómez is a fast, direct winger who usually plays on the right but can operate on either flank. He is known for his pace, his ability to beat defenders one-on-one and his work rate without the ball; Diniz said Gómez's one-on-one ability had given him greater confidence in the player.

== Career statistics ==
=== Club ===
As of match played 19 September 2026

Appearances and goals by club, season and competition
Club	Season	League			State League		National cup		Continental		Other		Total	
Club	Season	Division	Apps	Goals	Apps	Goals	Apps	Goals	Apps	Goals	Apps	Goals	Apps	Goals
Millonarios	2021	Categoría Primera A	8	0	—		—		—		—		8	0
Millonarios	2022	Categoría Primera A	41	9	—		8	3	1 (Note: Appearance in Copa Libertadores)	0	—		50	12
Millonarios	Total		49	9	—		8	3	1	0	—		58	12
Real Salt Lake	2023	Major League Soccer	30	1	—		5	1	—		5 (Note: Two appearances in Leagues Cup, three appearances in MLS Cup playoffs)	0	40	2
Real Salt Lake	2024	Major League Soccer	23	13	—		0	0	—		2 (Note: Appearances in Leagues Cup)	0	25	13
Real Salt Lake	Total		53	14	—		5	1	—		7	0	65	15
Rennes	2024–25	Ligue 1	17	3	—		2	0	—		—		19	3
Vasco da Gama (loan)	2025	Série A	16	1	—		5	0	—		—		21	1
Vasco da Gama	2026	Série A	24	5	9	1	6	2	6 (Note: Appearances in Copa Sudamericana)	0	—		45	8
Career total			159	32	9	1	26	6	7	0	7	0	208	39

=== International ===
As of match played 6 October 2026

Appearances and goals by national team and year
National team	Year	Apps	Goals
Colombia	2023	2	1
Colombia	2024	4	1
Colombia	2025	0	0
Colombia	2026	6	0
Total		12	2

Scores and results list Colombia's goal tally first, score column indicates score after each Gómez goal.

No.	Date	Venue	Opponent	Score	Final	Competition
1.	16 December 2023	Los Angeles Memorial Coliseum, Los Angeles, United States	Mexico	3–2	3–2	Friendly
2.	15 November 2024	Estadio Centenario, Montevideo, Uruguay	Uruguay	2–2	2–3	2026 FIFA World Cup qualification

== Honours ==
Millonarios

- Copa Colombia: 2022

Vasco da Gama

- Copa do Brasil runner-up: 2025

Individual

- Copa Colombia top scorer: 2022
- 2023 MLS Team of the Matchday: Matchday 9
- 2024 MLS Team of the Matchday: Matchday 3, Matchday 15 (Bench), Matchday 17 (Bench), Matchday 21, Matchday 24 (Bench), Matchday 28 (Bench)
