= Cacá (footballer, born 1999) =

Brazilian footballer

Personal information
- Full name: Carlos de Menezes Júnior
- Date of birth: 25 April 1999 (age 27)
- Place of birth: Visconde do Rio Branco, Minas Gerais, Brazil
- Height: 1.87 m (6 ft 2 in)
- Position: Centre-back

Team information
- Current team: Vitória (loan)
- Number: 25

Youth career
- 2014–2019: Cruzeiro

Senior career*
Years	Team	Apps	(Gls)
2019–2021	Cruzeiro	53	(3)
2021–2024	Tokushima Vortis	69	(3)
2023–2024	→ Athletico Paranaense (loan)	19	(2)
2024	→ Corinthians (loan)	26	(4)
2025–	Corinthians	26	(1)
2026–	→ Vitória (loan)	18	(1)
- * Club domestic league appearances and goals as of 23 August 2026

Carlos de Menezes Júnior (born 25 April 1999), commonly known as Cacá, is a Brazilian professional footballer who plays as a central defender for Vitória, on loan from Corinthians.

== Club career ==
Born in Visconde do Rio Branco, Minas Gerais, Cacá arrived at the youth setup of Cruzeiro in June 2014. Progressing through the youth ranks, he went on to captain the under-20 side in their Campeonato Mineiro under-20 triumph in 2018.

Promoted to the first team in March 2018, Cacá made his professional – and Série A debut on 14 October, playing the whole 90 minutes of a 2–0 away defeat against Vasco da Gama. Three days later, he was an unused substitute in the second leg of the Copa do Brasil Finals, with his side defeating Corinthians by 2–1.

Initially a backup to Dedé and Léo during the 2019 Campeonato Mineiro, Cacá started to feature more regularly during the league. He scored his first senior goal on 31 October of that year, netting the opener in a 2–0 away success over Botafogo, and finished the campaign with 20 league appearances as his side suffered a first-ever relegation.

On 6 January 2020, Cacá renewed his contract with Cruzeiro until December 2022.

On February 14, 2021, Cacá signed with J1 League side Tokushima Vortis.

On 21 July 2023, Cacá moved on loan to Athletico Paranaense.

On 7 March 2024, Cacá was loaned to Corinthians until the end of the season with an option to buy.

On 26 February 2026, Cacá was announced on loan to a Vitória.

== Career statistics ==
As of match played 23 August 2026

Appearances and goals by club, season and competition
Club	Season	League			State league (Note: Includes Campeonato Mineiro, Campeonato Paulista)		National cup (Note: Includes Copa do Brasil, Emperor's Cup)		League cup (Note: Includes J.League Cup)		Continental		Other		Total	
Club	Season	Division	Apps	Goals	Apps	Goals	Apps	Goals	Apps	Goals	Apps	Goals	Apps	Goals	Apps	Goals
Cruzeiro	2018	Série A	2	0	—		—		—		—		—		2	0
Cruzeiro	2019	Série A	20	1	—		—		—		—		—		20	1
Cruzeiro	2020	Série B	22	1	9	1	3	0	—		—		—		34	2
Cruzeiro	Total		44	2	9	1	3	0	—		—		—		56	3
Tokushima Vortis	2021	J1 League	26	1	—		1	0	2	1	—		—		29	2
Tokushima Vortis	2022	J2 League	33	2	—		1	0	6	0	—		—		40	2
Tokushima Vortis	2023	J2 League	10	0	—		—		—		—		—		10	0
Tokushima Vortis	Total		69	3	—		2	0	8	1	—		—		79	4
Athletico Paranaense (loan)	2023	Série A	19	2	—		—		—		1 (Note: Appearance in Copa Libertadores)	0	—		20	2
Corinthians (loan)	2024	Série A	26	4	—		4	2	—		9 (Note: Appearances in Copa Sudamericana)	0	—		39	6
Corinthians	2025	Série A	18	1	7	0	3	0	—		3	0	—		31	1
Corinthians	2026	Série A	—		1	0	—		—		—		—		1	0
Corinthians	Total		44	5	8	0	7	2	—		12	0	—		71	7
Vitória	2026	Série A	18	1	0	0	4	0	0	0	0	0	9 (Note: Appearance in Copa do Nordeste)	0	31	1
Career total			194	13	17	1	16	2	8	1	13	0	9	0	257	17

== Honours ==
Cruzeiro

- Copa do Brasil: 2018
- Campeonato Mineiro: 2018, 2019

Corinthians

- Copa do Brasil: 2025
- Campeonato Paulista: 2025
- Supercopa do Brasil: 2026
