= João Pedro (footballer, born December 2003) =

Brazilian footballer

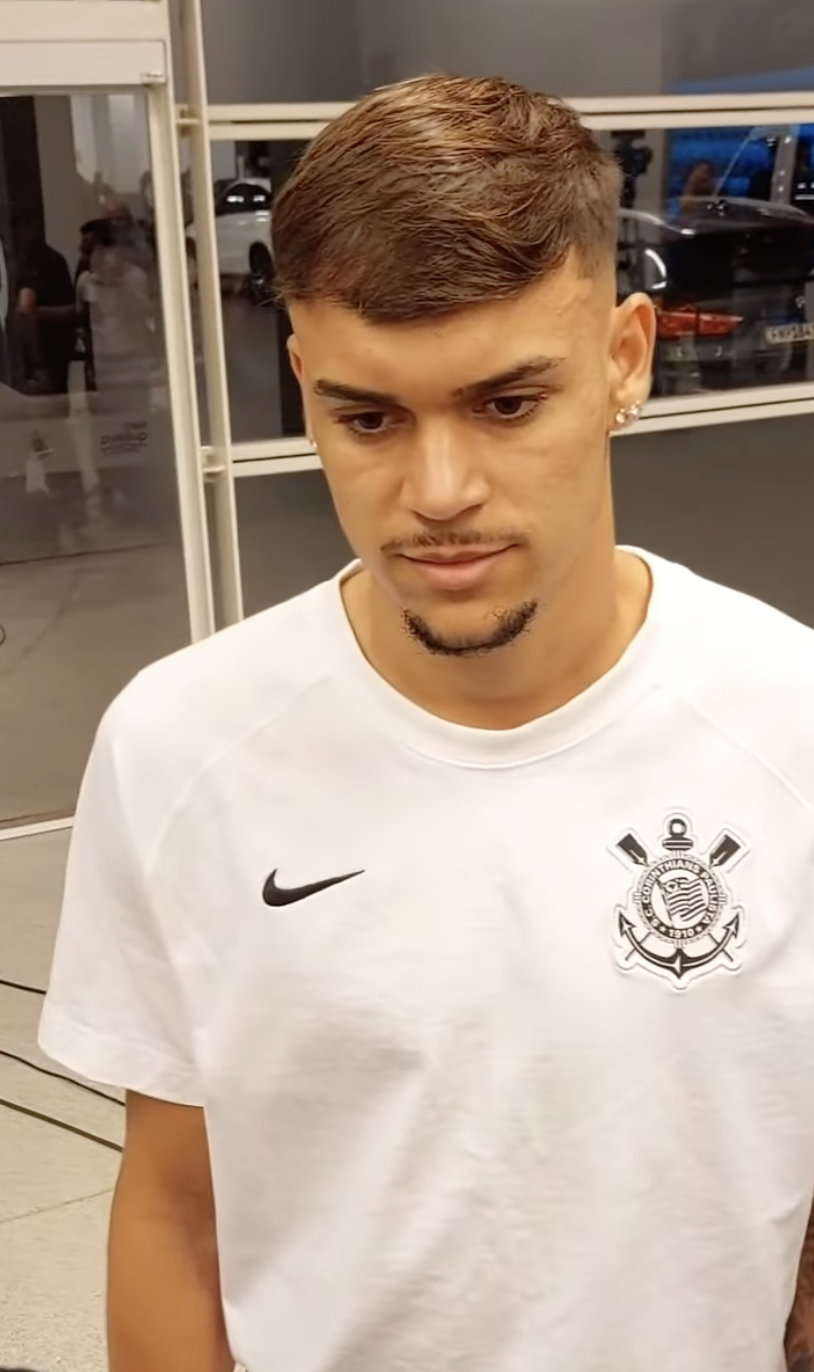

Personal information
- Full name: João Pedro de Sousa Rodrigues
- Date of birth: 31 December 2003 (age 22)
- Place of birth: Sete Lagoas, Brazil
- Height: 1.92 m (6 ft 4 in)
- Position: Centre-back

Team information
- Current team: Corinthians
- Number: 4

Youth career
- 2018: Desportivo Brasil
- 2019–2024: Corinthians

Senior career*
Years	Team	Apps	(Gls)
2024	→ Ceará (loan)	10	(0)
2024–	Corinthians	35	(2)
- * Club domestic league appearances and goals as of 18 November 2026

João Pedro de Sousa Rodrigues (born 31 December 2003), known as João Pedro Tchoca or just João Pedro, is a Brazilian footballer who plays as a centre-back for Corinthians.

== Club career ==
João Pedro was born in Sete Lagoas, Minas Gerais, and joined the youth sides of Corinthians in 2019, from Desportivo Brasil. The nickname "Tchoca" came from his father, who was called that in Minas Gerais, while the athlete started being called "Tchoca Jr.". In São Paulo, he became known simply as "Tchoca". In October of that year, however, he suffered a knee injury and was sidelined for more than a year due to the subsequent COVID-19 pandemic before returning to action in June 2021.

On 6 April 2022, João Pedro renewed his contract with Corinthians until March 2025. He made his first team debut on 10 March 2024, starting in a 0–0 Campeonato Paulista away draw against Água Santa, as both sides were already eliminated.

On 29 May 2024, João Pedro further extended his contract with Corinthians until the end of 2026. He made his Série A debut on 16 June, coming on as a late substitute for fellow youth graduate Wesley in a 2–2 home draw against São Paulo.

On 9 August 2024, João Pedro was loaned to Série B side Ceará until the end of the year. He left the club in December after helping in their promotion to the top tier, becoming a regular starter in the latter stages of the competition.

Back to Timão for the 2025 season, João Pedro scored his first senior goal on 22 January of that year, netting his side's second in a 2–1 home win over Água Santa.

== International career ==
On 10 April 2023, João Pedro was called up to the Brazil national under-20 team, but had to withdraw three days later due to an ankle injury.

== Career statistics ==
As of 18 November 2026

Appearances and goals by club, season and competition
Club	Season	League			State league (Note: Includes Campeonato Paulista)		National cup (Note: Includes Copa do Brasil)		Continental		Other		Total	
Club	Season	Division	Apps	Goals	Apps	Goals	Apps	Goals	Apps	Goals	Apps	Goals	Apps	Goals
Corinthians	2024	Série A	1	0	1	0	—		—		—		2	0
Corinthians	2025	Série A	16	0	7	1	2	0	4 (Note: Appearances in Copa Libertadores)	0	—		29	1
Corinthians	2026	Série A	7	1	3	0	—		1	0	—		11	1
Corinthians	Total		23	1	10	1	2	0	5	0	—		40	2
Ceará (loan)	2024	Série B	10	0	—		—		—		—		10	0
Career total			33	1	11	1	2	0	5	0	—		51	2

== Honours ==
Corinthians

- Copa do Brasil: 2025
- Campeonato Paulista: 2025
- Supercopa do Brasil: 2026
