= Gabriel Caipira =

Brazilian footballer

Personal information
- Full name: Gabriel Henrique Soares da Silva
- Date of birth: 15 February 2005 (age 21)
- Place of birth: Salesópolis, Brazil
- Height: 1.73 m (5 ft 8 in)
- Position: Right-back

Team information
- Current team: Corinthians

Youth career
- 2014–2023: Corinthians

Senior career*
Years	Team	Apps	(Gls)
2023–	Corinthians	0	(0)
2026	→ Betim (loan)	12	(1)
- * Club domestic league appearances and goals as of 9 August 2026

Gabriel Henrique Soares da Silva (born 15 February 2005), commonly known as Gabriel Caipira or simply Caipira, is a Brazilian footballer who plays as a right-back, and can also play as a left-back, for Corinthians.

== Club career ==
Born in Salesópolis, in the state of São Paulo, Caipira joined the youth academy of Corinthians in 2014, completing almost all of his football development at the club. He was included in the squad for the 2023 Copa São Paulo de Futebol Júnior under coach Danilo, and was called up again for the 2024 edition, that time playing as a right winger, having featured as a forward for part of the 2024 season. He signed his first professional contract with Corinthians on 24 August 2023.

Caipira was named captain of Corinthians' under-20 side during the 2025 season, in which he provided six assists, and in 2025 he was included in a Corinthians first-team matchday squad for a Brazilian Championship fixture against Sport under coach Ramón Díaz, without making an appearance. He was selected for the squad for the 2026 Copa São Paulo de Futebol Júnior, but missed the tournament, his final season of eligibility for the youth competition, because of a tibial stress fracture.

With no space in the first-team squad, Caipira was loaned to Betim, of Minas Gerais, for the 2026 Campeonato Brasileiro Série D campaign; the loan was registered with the Brazilian Football Confederation's daily bulletin (BID) in March 2026, with the loan contract running until the end of that year. He made his senior debut for Betim on 4 March 2026, coming on as a substitute for Riquelmy in the closing stages of a 2–0 defeat to Operário-PR in the second round of the Copa do Brasil.

Caipira went on to establish himself as a regular starter for Betim during the Série D campaign. The club's season ended with a last-16 exit in the Série D to CSA on 13 July 2026, having earlier been eliminated in the first phase of the Campeonato Mineiro and in the second round of the Copa do Brasil.

In July 2026, Caipira returned to Corinthians following a successful loan spell at Betim.

== Career statistics ==
As of match played 9 August 2026

Appearances and goals by club, season and competition
Club	Season	League			State league		National cup		Continental		Other		Total	
Club	Season	Division	Apps	Goals	Apps	Goals	Apps	Goals	Apps	Goals	Apps	Goals	Apps	Goals
Corinthians	2025	Série A	0	0	—		—		—		—		0	0
Betim (loan)	2026	Série D	11	1	0	0	1	0	0	0	0	0	12	1
Corinthians	2026	Série A	0	0	0	0	0	0	0	0	0	0	0	0
Total		11	1	0	0	1	0	0	0	0	0	0	12	1
