= Ryan (footballer, born 2003) =

Brazilian footballer

Personal information
- Full name: Ryan Gustavo de Lima
- Date of birth: 15 July 2003 (age 23)
- Place of birth: São Paulo, Brazil
- Height: 1.73 m (5 ft 8 in)
- Position: Defensive midfielder

Team information
- Current team: Fortaleza (on loan from Corinthians)
- Number: 37

Youth career
- 2011–2024: Corinthians

Senior career*
Years	Team	Apps	(Gls)
2023–	Corinthians	45	(1)
2026–	→ Fortaleza (loan)	17	(0)
- * Club domestic league appearances and goals as of 23 August 2026

Ryan Gustavo de Lima (born 15 July 2003), simply known as Ryan, is a Brazilian footballer who plays as a defensive midfielder for Fortaleza on loan from Corinthians.

== Career ==
Ryan was born in São Paulo, and joined the youth sides of Corinthians at the age of eight, initially to play for the futsal teams. On 13 July 2021, he signed his first professional contract with the club, agreeing to a three-year deal.

Ryan made his professional debut with Timão on 29 June 2023, coming on as a late substitute for Rafael Ramos in a 3–0 home win over Liverpool Montevideo, for the year's Copa Libertadores, as both sides were already eliminated. On 17 July, he replaced Giuliano and scored the winner in a 2–1 Copa Sudamericana away success over Universitario; while celebrating, he started an on-field brawl after showing his shirt to the home supporters.

On 21 July 2023, Ryan signed a new three-year contract with Corinthians.

== Career statistics ==
As of match played 19 August 2026

Club	Season	League			State League		Cup		Continental		Other		Total	
Club	Season	Division	Apps	Goals	Apps	Goals	Apps	Goals	Apps	Goals	Apps	Goals	Apps	Goals
Corinthians	2023	Série A	—		—		—		2 (Note: One appearance in Copa Libertadores, one appearance and one goal in Copa Sudamericana)	1	—		2	1
Corinthians	2024	Série A	11	0	4	0	3	0	4 (Note: Appearances in Copa Sudamericana)	0	—		22	0
Corinthians	2025	Série A	16	0	13	0	3	0	2	0	—		34	0
Corinthians	2026	Série A	0	0	1	0	0	0	0	0	—		1	0
Corinthians	Total		27	0	18	0	6	0	8	1	—		59	1
Fortaleza (Loan)	2026	Série B	15	0	2	0	3	0	0	0	8 (Note: Appearance in Copa do Nordeste)	0	28	0
Career total			42	0	20	0	9	0	8	1	8	0	87	1

== Honours ==
Corinthians U20

- Copa São Paulo de Futebol Júnior: 2024

Corinthians

- Campeonato Paulista: 2025
- Copa do Brasil: 2025

Fortaleza

- Campeonato Cearense: 2026
