= José Andrés Martínez =

Venezuelan footballer (born 1994)

Personal information
- Full name: José Andrés Martínez Torres
- Date of birth: 7 August 1994 (age 32)
- Place of birth: Maracaibo, Venezuela
- Height: 1.78 m (5 ft 10 in)
- Position: Midfielder

Team information
- Current team: FC Cincinnati
- Number: 8

Senior career*
Years	Team	Apps	(Gls)
2015–2017	JBL Zulia	60	(3)
2018–2019	Zulia	61	(2)
2020–2024	Philadelphia Union	108	(3)
2024–2026	Corinthians	46	(2)
2026–	FC Cincinnati	0	(0)

International career^{‡}
2021–2025	Venezuela	41	(0)
- * Club domestic league appearances and goals as of 04:42, 9 October 2026 (UTC) ‡ National team caps and goals as of 23:20, 21 September 2025 (UTC)

José Andrés Martínez Torres (born 7 August 1994) is a Venezuelan professional footballer who plays as a midfielder for Major League Soccer club FC Cincinnati and Venezuela national team. Martínez has been referred to by the nickname "el Brujo" (Spanish for "the Wizard").

== Club career ==
=== Zulia ===
After two seasons with Deportivo JBL del Zulia, Martínez signed with Zulia FC ahead of the Apertura tournament in December 2017. While with Zulia, he earned the 2018 Copa Venezuela title and made a historic run in the Copa Sudamericana; advancing through to the quarter-finals.

=== Philadelphia Union ===
In December 2019, Martínez signed a two-year contract with Philadelphia Union competing in Major League Soccer for a transfer fee reported around $325,000. Martínez made his debut start for the Union in a 3-3 draw at Los Angeles FC. During the 2020 season, Martinez grew praise for his quality of play as one of the best defensive midfielders in MLS. His first season in MLS finished with 14 regular season starts, contributing two assists, and ultimately resulting in the Union's first trophy, the 2020 Supporters' Shield. In January 2021, Martinez signed a new contract with the Union through the 2022 season, with options for the 2023 and 2024 seasons.

On 21 June 2023, Jose Martinez scored a goal for the Union that was nominated for the MLS Goal of the Year Award.

=== Corinthians ===
In August 2024, Martínez signed with Corinthians competing in Brazil's Série A for a transfer fee reported up to $2,000,000.

== International career ==
Martinez received his first official call up to the Venezuela national team in October 2020. He represented the senior Venezuela national team in a 3–1 2022 FIFA World Cup qualification loss to Bolivia on 3 June 2021.

== Career statistics ==
=== Club ===
As of match played 21 December 2025

Appearances and goals by club, season and competition
Club	Season	League			State league (Note: Includes Campeonato Paulista)		National cup (Note: Includes Copa Venezuela, U.S. Open Cup, Copa do Brasil)		Continental		Other		Total	
Club	Season	Division	Apps	Goals	Apps	Goals	Apps	Goals	Apps	Goals	Apps	Goals	Apps	Goals
JBL Zulia	2015	Venezuelan Primera División	0	0	–		0	0	–		2 (Note: Appearances in Venezuelan Primera División Relegation playoffs)	0	2	0
JBL Zulia	2016	Venezuelan Primera División	32	2	–		2	0	–		0	0	34	2
JBL Zulia	2017	Venezuelan Primera División	28	1	–		0	0	–		0	0	28	1
JBL Zulia	Total		60	3	–		2	0	–		2	0	64	3
Zulia	2018	Venezuelan Primera División	28	1	–		6	0	0	0	–		34	1
Zulia	2019	Venezuelan Primera División	33	1	–		3	0	8 (Note: Appearances in Copa Sudamericana)	0	–		44	1
Zulia	Total		61	2	–		9	0	8	0	–		78	2
Philadelphia Union	2020	MLS	14	0	–		–		–		4 (Note: Appearances in the MLS is Back Tournament)	0	18	0
Philadelphia Union	2021	MLS	27	0	–		–		5 (Note: Appearances in the CONCACAF Champions Cup)	0	1	0	33	0
Philadelphia Union	2022	MLS	33	0	–		1	0	–		—		34	0
Philadelphia Union	2023	MLS	27	3	–		–		5	0	7 (Note: Appearances in Leagues Cup)	0	39	3
Philadelphia Union	2024	MLS	14	0	–		–		4	0	0	0	18	0
Philadelphia Union	Total		115	3	–		1	0	14	0	12	0	142	3
Corinthians	2024	Série A	11	0	—		3	0	4	0	—		18	0
Corinthians	2025	Série A	24	1	11	1	8	0	9 (Note: Three appearances in Copa Libertadores, three appearances in Copa Sudamericana)	0	—		52	2
Corinthians	Total		35	1	11	1	11	0	13	0	–		70	2
Career total			271	9	11	1	23	0	35	0	14	0	354	10

=== International ===
As of match played 9 September 2025

Appearances and goals by national team and year
National team	Year	Apps	Goals
Venezuela	2021	12	0
Venezuela	2022	8	0
Venezuela	2023	7	0
Venezuela	2024	10	0
Venezuela	2025	4	0
Total		41	0

== Honours ==
Zulia FC

- Copa Venezuela: 2018

Philadelphia Union

- Supporters' Shield: 2020

Corinthians

- Copa do Brasil: 2025
- Campeonato Paulista: 2025

Individual

- MLS All-Star: 2023
