= Luiz Eduardo (footballer, born 2007) =

Brazilian footballer

Personal information
- Full name: Luiz Eduardo Amorim de Souza
- Date of birth: 26 June 2007 (age 19)
- Place of birth: São Paulo, Brazil
- Height: 1.73 m (5 ft 8 in)
- Position: Attacking midfielder

Team information
- Current team: Santos U20 (on loan from Corinthians)

Youth career
- 2022–2024: Água Santa
- 2024–: Corinthians
- 2026–: → Santos (loan)

Senior career*
Years	Team	Apps	(Gls)
2024	Água Santa	1	(0)
2025–	Corinthians	2	(0)
- * Club domestic league appearances and goals as of 21:18, 29 October 2026 (UTC)

Luiz Eduardo Amorim de Souza (born 26 June 2007), known as Luiz Eduardo, is a Brazilian footballer who plays as an attacking midfielder for Santos' under-20 team, on loan from Corinthians.

== Career ==
Luiz Eduardo was born in São Paulo, and joined the youth sides of Água Santa in 2022. He made his senior debut with the club on 10 March 2024, coming on as a late substitute for Neilton in a 0–0 Campeonato Paulista home draw against SC Corinthians Paulista.

In April 2024, Luiz Eduardo signed a contract with Timão until April 2029, becoming the longest-lasting link among all the players in the youth and professional teams at that time; he was initially assigned to the under-20 squad. He made his first team debut with the club on 1 February of the following year, replacing Igor Coronado late into a 2–1 home win over Noroeste, for the year's Paulistão.

Luiz Eduardo played one further match for the main squad of Corinthians before returning to the under-20s, where he lost his starting spot during the 2026 season. On 11 September of that year, he was loaned to Santos for one year, with a buyout clause.

== Career statistics ==
As of 3 February 2025

Club	Season	League			State League		Cup		Continental		Other		Total	
Club	Season	Division	Apps	Goals	Apps	Goals	Apps	Goals	Apps	Goals	Apps	Goals	Apps	Goals
Água Santa	2024	Série D	—		1	0	—		—		—		2	0
Corinthians	2025	Série A	—		2	0	—		0	0	—		2	0
Career total			0	0	3	0	0	0	0	0	0	0	3	0

== Honours ==
Corinthians

- Campeonato Paulista: 2025
