= Maycon (footballer, born 1997) =

Brazilian footballer

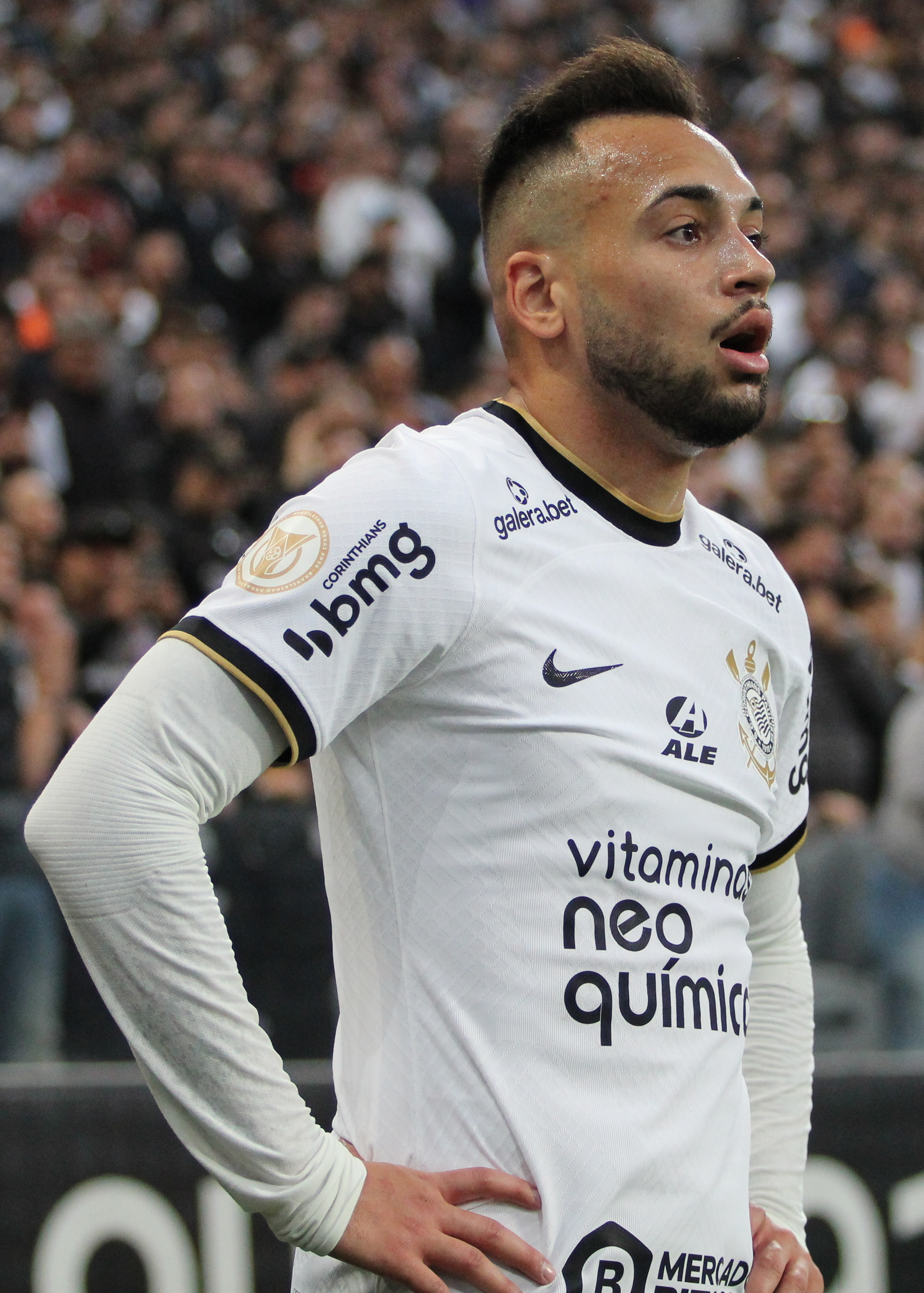
- Maycon playing with Corinthians in 2022

Personal information
- Full name: Maycon de Andrade Barberan
- Date of birth: 15 July 1997 (age 29)
- Place of birth: São Paulo, Brazil
- Height: 1.71 m (5 ft 7 in)
- Position: Midfielder

Team information
- Current team: Atlético Mineiro
- Number: 8

Youth career
- 2008: Portuguesa
- 2009–2016: Corinthians

Senior career*
Years	Team	Apps	(Gls)
2016–2018	Corinthians	85	(5)
2016	→ Ponte Preta (loan)	16	(2)
2018–2026	Shakhtar Donetsk	65	(7)
2022–2025	→ Corinthians (loan)	96	(7)
2026–	Atlético Mineiro	11	(0)

International career^{‡}
2013	Brazil U17		
2016–2017	Brazil U20	8	(1)
2020	Brazil U23	5	(0)
- * Club domestic league appearances and goals as of 7 April 2026 ‡ National team caps and goals as of 2 July 2021

Maycon de Andrade Barberan (born 15 July 1997), known as just Maycon, is a Brazilian footballer who plays as midfielder for Campeonato Brasileiro Série A club Atlético Mineiro.

== Career ==
=== Early life ===
Maycon began playing for Corinthians academy at the age of twelve and had a very successful campaign. He won the 2014 and 2015 U20 Campeonato Paulista, 2014 U20 Campeonato Brasileiro, the 2015 Copa São Paulo de Futebol Júnior, including scoring the winning goal during the final.

=== Corinthians ===
Maycon made his professional debut on 11 February 2016, as he started on Corinthians 2–1 victory against Capivariano at Arena Corinthians. He scored his first goal in a 3–0 away win against Botafogo-SP on March 13.

==== Ponte Preta (loan) ====
On 14 July, Maycon was loaned to fellow Série A club Ponte Preta.

=== Shakhtar Donetsk ===
On 17 June 2018 Maycon was transferred to Ukrainian Premier League club Shakhtar Donetsk and signed 5-year contract.

==== Corinthians (loan) ====
On 31 March 2022, Shakhtar Donetsk confirmed that Maycon had joined Corinthians on loan until the end of 2022. The loan went through three extensions and he remained with Corinthians until December 2025, captaining the side to the 2025 Copa do Brasil title.

=== Atlético Mineiro ===
On 8 January 2026, Atlético Mineiro announced an agreement in principle to sign Maycon. Five days later, the deal was confirmed and he signed a three-year contract.

== Career statistics ==
As of match played 21 December 2025

Club	Season	League			State league (Note: Includes Campeonato Paulista)		National cup (Note: Includes Copa do Brasil, Ukrainian Cup)		Continental		Other		Total	
Club	Season	Division	Apps	Goals	Apps	Goals	Apps	Goals	Apps	Goals	Apps	Goals	Apps	Goals
Corinthians	2016	Série A	2	0	10	1	0	0	3 (Note: Appearances in Copa Libertadores)	0	—		15	1
Corinthians	2017	Série A	36	1	13	2	5	1	4 (Note: Appearances in Copa Sudamericana)	1	—		58	5
Corinthians	2018	Série A	10	0	14	1	2	1	6	0	—		32	2
Corinthians	Total		48	1	37	4	7	2	13	1	—		105	8
Ponte Preta (loan)	2016	Série A	16	2	—		3	0	—		—		19	2
Ponte Preta (loan)	Total		16	2	—		3	0	—		—		19	2
Shakhtar Donetsk	2018–19	Ukrainian Premier League	21	4	—		2	0	7 (Note: Six appearances and one goal in UEFA Champions League, and one appearance in UEFA Europa League)	1	0	0	30	5
Shakhtar Donetsk	2019–20	Ukrainian Premier League	10	1	—		0	0	2 (Note: Appearancex in UEFA Europa League)	0	0	0	12	1
Shakhtar Donetsk	2020–21	Ukrainian Premier League	19	2	—		1	0	10 (Note: Six appearances in UEFA Champions League, four in UEFA Europa League)	0	0	0	30	2
Shakhtar Donetsk	2021–22	Ukrainian Premier League	15	0	—		0	0	10 (Note: Appearancex in UEFA Champions League)	0	1 (Note: Appearance in Ukrainian Super Cup)	0	26	0
Shakhtar Donetsk	Total		65	7	—		3	0	29	1	1	0	98	8
Corinthians (loan)	2022	Série A	16	0	—		3	0	7	2	—		26	2
Corinthians (loan)	2023	Série A	32	2	7	0	7	0	12 (Note: Four appearances in Copa Libertadores, eight appearances and one goal in Copa Sudamericana)	1	—		58	3
Corinthians (loan)	2024	Série A	2	0	10	2	1	0	0	0	—		13	2
Corinthians (loan)	2025	Série A	24	3	4	0	8	0	6	0	—		42	3
Corinthians (loan)	Total		75	5	21	2	19	0	25	3	—		140	10
Career Total			204	15	58	6	32	2	67	5	1	0	362	28

== Honours ==
Corinthians

- Campeonato Brasileiro Série A: 2017
- Copa do Brasil: 2025 runner-up: 2018
- Campeonato Paulista: 2017, 2018, 2025

Shakhtar Donetsk

- Ukrainian Premier League: 2018–19, 2019–20
- Ukrainian Cup: 2018–19
- Ukrainian Super Cup: 2021 runner-up: 2020

Atlético Mineiro

- Campeonato Mineiro runner-up: 2026
