= Yuri Alberto =

Brazilian footballer

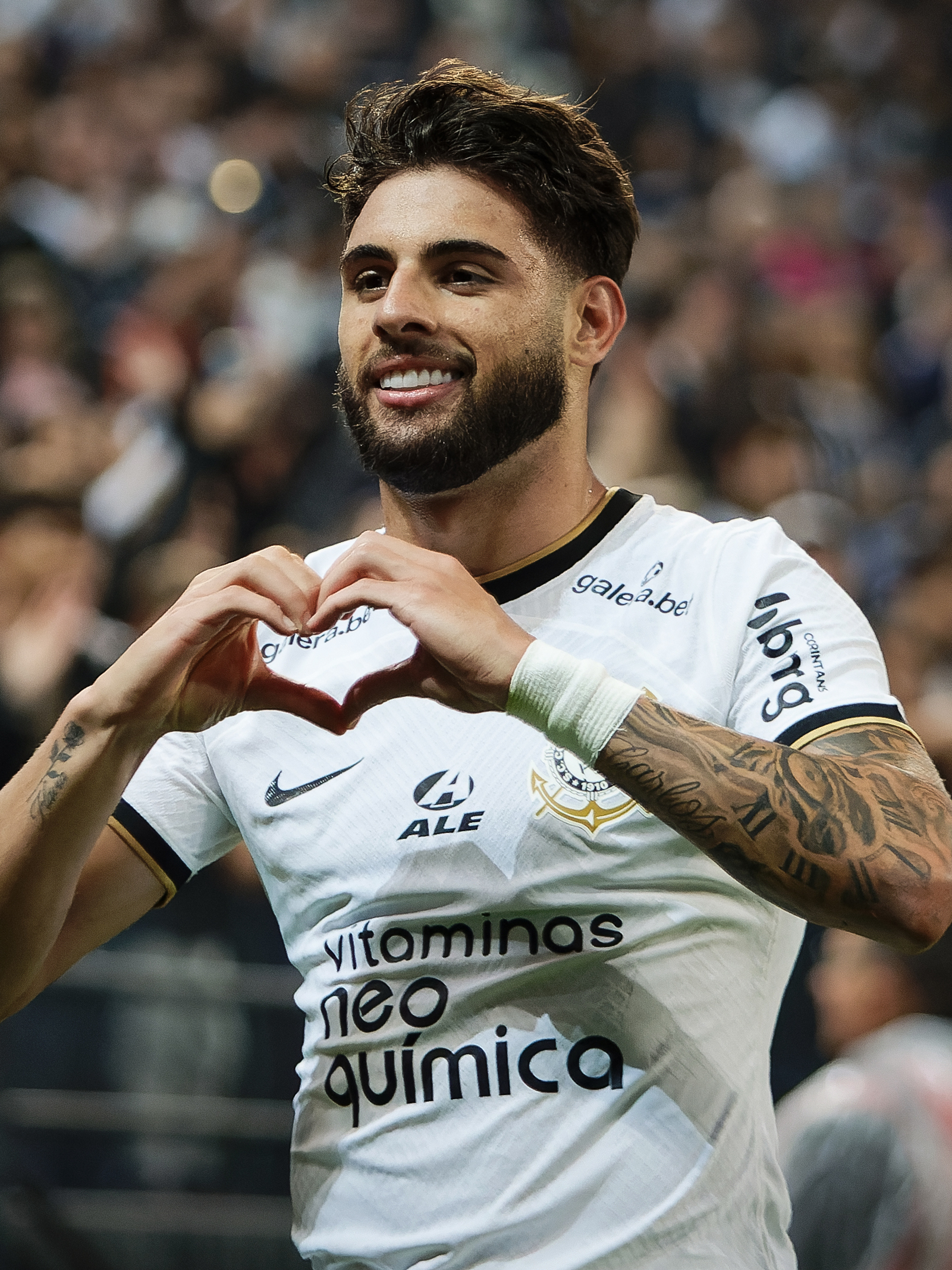
- Yuri Alberto with Corinthians in 2022

Personal information
- Full name: Yuri Alberto Monteiro da Silva
- Date of birth: 18 March 2001 (age 25)
- Place of birth: São José dos Campos, Brazil
- Height: 1.82 m (6 ft 0 in)
- Position: Striker

Team information
- Current team: Corinthians
- Number: 9

Youth career
- 2013–2019: Santos

Senior career*
Years	Team	Apps	(Gls)
2017–2020	Santos	20	(2)
2020–2022	Internacional	70	(27)
2022–2023	Zenit Saint Petersburg	11	(4)
2022–2023	→ Corinthians (loan)	20	(8)
2023–	Corinthians	153	(53)

International career^{‡}
2017	Brazil U17	12	(6)
2020–	Brazil U23	2	(0)
2023–	Brazil	1	(0)
- * Club domestic league appearances and goals as of 5 November 2026 (UTC) ‡ National team caps and goals as of 25 March 2023

Yuri Alberto Monteiro da Silva (born 18 March 2001), known as Yuri Alberto, is a Brazilian footballer who plays as a striker for Corinthians.

== Club career ==
=== Santos ===
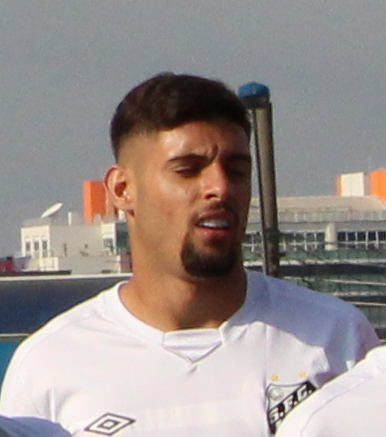
Yuri Alberto with Santos U20 in 2019

Born in the northern neighbourhood of Vila Cristina in São José dos Campos, Yuri Alberto joined Santos' youth setup in 2013 at the age of twelve. On 28 July 2017, he signed his first professional contract after agreeing to a three-year deal.

On 1 November 2017, Yuri Alberto was promoted to the main squad by interim manager Elano. He made his first team – and Série A – debut fifteen days later, coming on as a substitute for Renato in a 3–1 away loss against Bahia.

Yuri Alberto scored his first goal for the club on 7 March 2018, netting the equalizer in a 2–1 Campeonato Paulista away loss against Grêmio Novorizontino; aged 16 years, 11 months and 20 days, he became the sixth youngest to score for Peixe in their history. He made his Copa Libertadores debut on 24 May, replacing Vitor Bueno in a 0–0 home draw against Real Garcilaso.

After featuring sparingly during the 2018 campaign, Yuri Alberto only managed to appear twice under Jorge Sampaoli in 2019. In March 2020, he returned to the first team under new manager Jesualdo Ferreira, but still rejected a contract renewal from the club and opted to leave in July.

=== Internacional ===
On 16 July 2020, it was announced that Yuri Alberto agreed to a five-year contract with fellow top-tier side Internacional, effective as of 1 August. This led to a conflict with Santos, as the club claimed a clause in Yuri Alberto's contract granted them priority for the renewal. Shortly after the announcement in the media, Internacional released an official statement regretting the "leak" of the offer.

On 3 August 2020, after releasing a note two days earlier stating that the club "wished him success on his career playing for Santos", Internacional announced the signing of Yuri Alberto on a five-year deal. The following 20 January, he scored a second-half hat-trick and made an assist in a 5–1 away routing of São Paulo, taking his tally up to ten league goals in only 16 matches. On 8 August 2021, he scored his second hat-trick for Internacional in a 4–0 away win over Flamengo, reaching his fourth goal in the Série A season.

=== Zenit Saint Petersburg ===
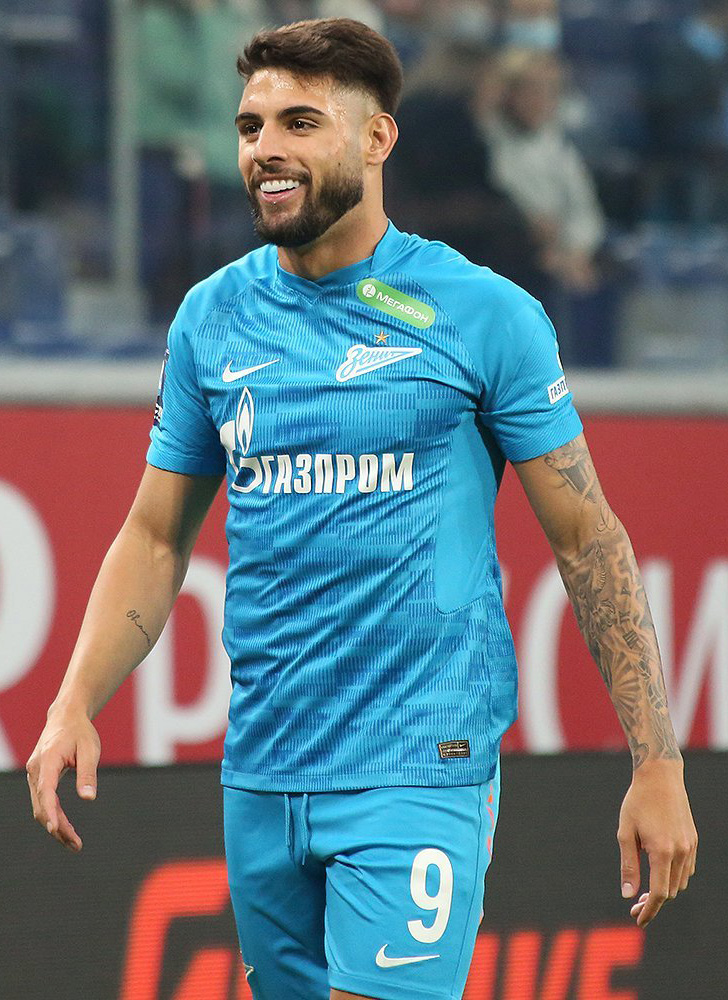
Yuri Alberto with Zenit in 2022

On 30 January 2022, Yuri Alberto signed a five-year deal with Russian Premier League club FC Zenit Saint Petersburg.

=== Corinthians ===
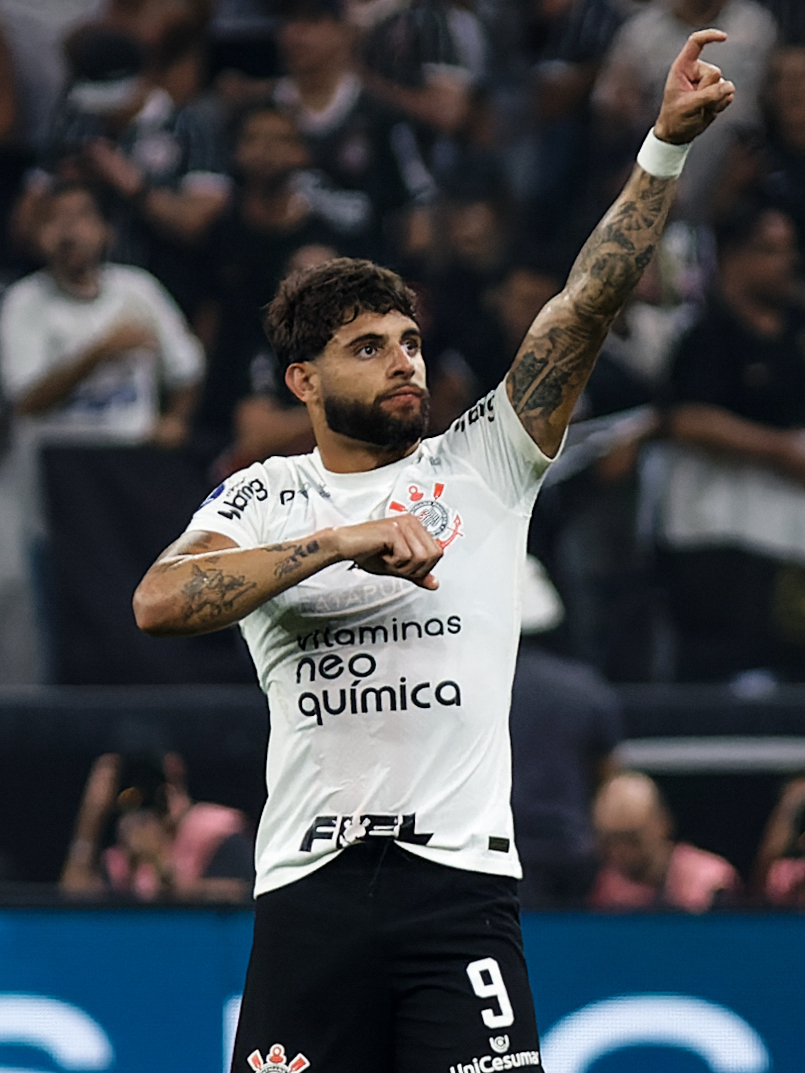
Yuri Alberto with Corinthians in 2023

On 29 June 2022, Zenit announced an agreement with Corinthians under which Yuri Alberto would move to Corinthians on loan, and Ivan and Gustavo Mantuan would move on loan in the opposite direction.

In January 2023, he signed a permanent five-year deal with the Brazilian club, the transfer seeing Robert Renan and Du Queiroz moving in the opposite direction.

== International career ==
On 16 February 2017, Yuri Alberto was called up to Brazil under-17s for the year's South American Under-17 Football Championship. He also featured in the Montaigu Tournament and in the FIFA U-17 World Cup.

On 7 March 2018, Yuri Alberto and Santos teammate Rodrygo were called up to the under-20s, but both were cut from the squad six days later after a request from his club's president. Alberto made his senior international debut on 25 March 2023 in a friendly game against Morocco. He replaced Lucas Paquetá in the 85th minute as Brazil lost 2-1 at the Venue Grand Stade de Tanger in Tanger.

== Personal life ==
Born in Brazil, Yuri Alberto is of Italian descent. He holds dual Brazilian and Italian citizenship.

== Career statistics ==
As of match played 5 November 2026

Appearances and goals by club, season and competition
Club	Season	League			State league (Note: Includes Campeonato Paulista)		National cup (Note: Includes Copa do Brasil, Russian Cup)		Continental		Other		Total	
Club	Season	Division	Apps	Goals	Apps	Goals	Apps	Goals	Apps	Goals	Apps	Goals	Apps	Goals
Santos	2017	Série A	2	0	—		—		—		—		2	0
Santos	2018	Série A	9	0	4	1	2	1	1 (Note: Appearance(s) in Copa Libertadores)	0	3 (Note: Appearances in Copa Paulista)	0	19	2
Santos	2019	Série A	0	0	2	0	0	0	0	0	—		2	0
Santos	2020	Série A	0	0	3	1	0	0	2	0	—		5	1
Santos	Total		11	0	9	2	2	1	3	0	3	0	28	3
Internacional	2020	Série A	23	10	—		3	1	3	0	—		29	11
Internacional	2021	Série A	33	12	13	4	2	0	7	3	—		55	19
Internacional	2022	Série A	—		1	1	—		—		—		1	1
Internacional	Total		56	22	14	5	5	1	10	3	—		85	31
Zenit Saint Petersburg	2021–22	Russian Premier League	11	4	—		2	2	2 (Note: Appearances in UEFA Europa League)	0	—		15	6
Corinthians (loan)	2022	Série A	20	8	—		6	3	2	0	—		28	11
Corinthians	2023	Série A	34	8	10	4	8	1	11 (Note: Five appearances in Copa Libertadores, six appearances and two goals in Copa Sudamericana)	2	—		63	15
Corinthians	2024	Série A	29	15	11	5	7	2	10 (Note: Appearances in Copa Sudamericana)	9	—		57	31
Corinthians	2025	Série A	26	10	14	5	9	2	9	2	—		58	19
Corinthians	2026	Série A	23	4	6	2	2	1	6 (Note: Appearances in Copa Libertadores)	1	1 (Note: Appearance in Supercopa do Brasil)	1	38	9
Corinthians	Total		132	45	41	16	32	9	38	14	1	1	244	85
Career total			210	71	64	23	41	13	53	17	4	1	372	125

== Honours ==
Zenit Saint Petersburg

- Russian Premier League: 2021–22

Corinthians

- Copa do Brasil: 2025
- Supercopa do Brasil: 2026
- Campeonato Paulista: 2025

Brazil U17

- South American U-17 Championship: 2017

Individual

- Campeonato Brasileiro Série A Top scorer: 2024
- Troféu Mesa Redonda Team of the Year: 2024
