= Dieguinho (footballer, born 2007) =

Brazilian footballer

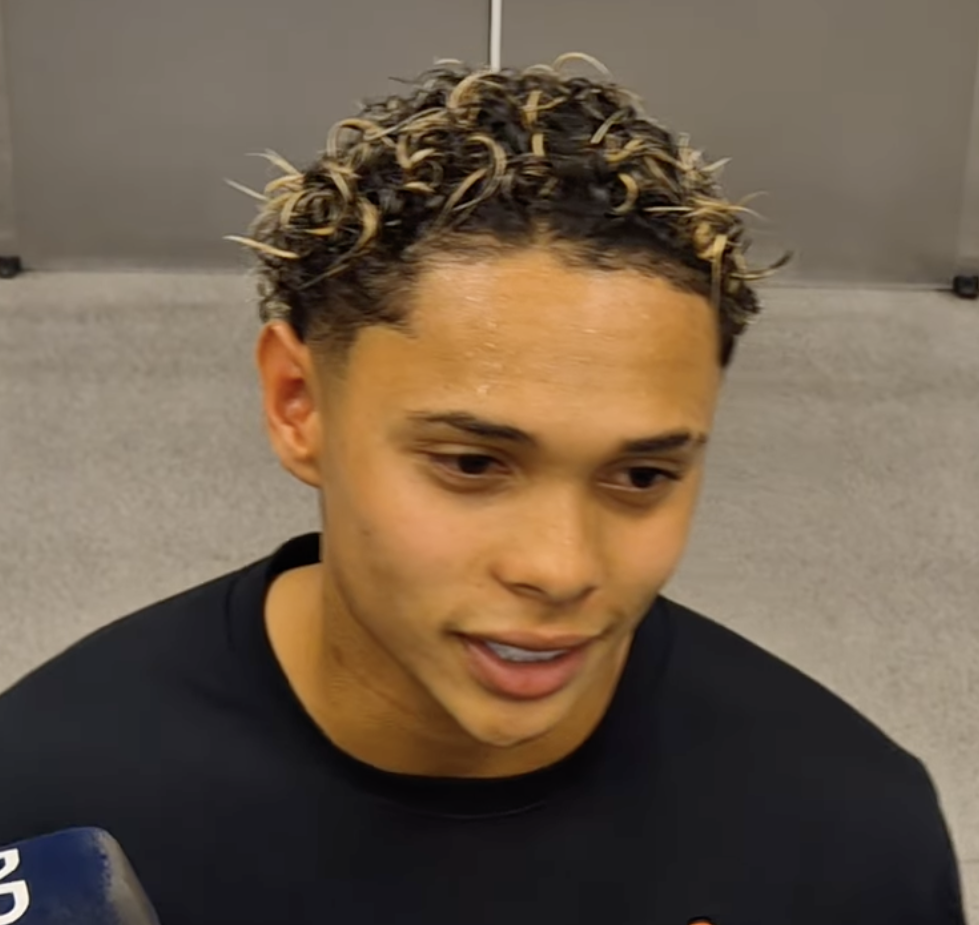
- Dieguinho during a post-match interview as a Corinthians player in 2026

Personal information
- Full name: Diego da Cruz Lopes
- Date of birth: 16 September 2007 (age 19)
- Place of birth: São Paulo, Brazil
- Height: 1.70 m (5 ft 7 in)
- Position: Winger

Team information
- Current team: Corinthians
- Number: 61

Youth career
- 2015–2025: Corinthians

Senior career*
Years	Team	Apps	(Gls)
2025–	Corinthians	37	(2)
- * Club domestic league appearances and goals as of 18 November 2026 (UTC)

Diego da Cruz Lopes (born 16 September 2007), commonly known as Dieguinho, is a Brazilian footballer who plays mainly as a right winger for Corinthians.

== Early life ==
Born and raised in Vila Alpina, a neighborhood of São Paulo, Dieguinho was named after Diego Maradona.

== Career ==
Dieguinho joined the youth sides of Corinthians at the age of seven, initially for the futsal team. On 23 November 2024, he renewed his contract with the club until 2027.

Dieguinho made his professional debut for Corinthians on 19 April 2025, coming on as a second-half substitute for Ángel Romero in a 2–1 win over Sport Recife at the Neo Química Arena.

== Career statistics ==
As of 18 November 2026

Appearances and goals by club, season and competition
Club	Season	League			State League		Cup		Continental		Other		Total	
Club	Season	Division	Apps	Goals	Apps	Goals	Apps	Goals	Apps	Goals	Apps	Goals	Apps	Goals
Corinthians	2025	Série A	13	0	—		1	0	—		—		14	0
Corinthians	2026	Série A	18	1	7	1	3	0	2 (Note: Appearance(s) in Copa Libertadores)	0	0	0	30	2
Total			31	1	7	1	4	0	2	0	0	0	44	2

== Honours ==
Corinthians

- Copa do Brasil: 2025
- Supercopa do Brasil: 2026
