= 2023 Sport Club Corinthians Paulista season =

Corinthians 2023 football season

Corinthians
2023 season
- President: Duílio Monteiro Alves
- Manager: Fernando Lázaro (until 20 April); Cuca (20 April – 27 April); Danilo (caretaker, 28 April – 30 April); Vanderlei Luxemburgo (1 May – 27 September); Mano Menezes (from 28 September)
- Stadium: Neo Química Arena
- Série A: 13th
- Copa do Brasil: Semi-finals
- Campeonato Paulista: Quarter-finals
- Copa Libertadores: Group stage
- Copa Sudamericana: Semi-finals
- Top goalscorer: League: Ángel Romero; Yuri Alberto (8 each); All: Róger Guedes (21)
- Highest home attendance: 46,965 vs São Paulo (25 July 2023)
- Lowest home attendance: 26,556 vs Liverpool (28 June 2023)
- Average home league attendance: 38,670
Home colors	Away colors	Third colors

The 2023 season was the 114th season in the history of Sport Club Corinthians Paulista. The season covered the period from January 2023 to December 2023. The pre-season began earlier than usual on December 14, 2022, as the previous season was shorter due to the 2022 FIFA World Cup taking place at the end of the year.

The club also held elections in November to determine the new president and deliberative council for the 2024–2026 term.

== Background ==
=== Kits ===
- Home (13 April 2023 onward): White shirt, black shorts and white socks with a yellow horizontal stripe;
- Away (13 April 2023 onward): Black shirt with white stripes, white shorts and black socks;
- Third (20 September 2023 onward): Yellow shirt, yellow shorts and yellow socks;
- Fourth (28 May 2023 onward): Beige shirt, black shorts and black socks.

=== Previous Kits ===
- Home (Until 12 April 2023): White shirt, black shorts and white socks;
- Away (Until 12 April 2023): Black shirt, white shorts and black socks;
- Third (Until 19 September 2023): Beige shirt with shodô stripes, black shorts and beige socks with shodô stripes.

=== Board changes ===
On March 21, Corinthians' president Duílio Monteiro Alves announced that former president and current football director Roberto de Andrade stepped down after fans protested against him, including an invasion at the club's training center on March 17.

=== Presidential election ===
On 25 November, the election to decide Corinthians' new president for the 2024–2026 term was held featuring only associates of the social club, meaning that less than 4,500 people would decide the winner. Augusto Melo defeated André Negão with 2771 votes (66,2 percent of the total). Negão was part of Renovação e Transparência, the same group that has been in charge of the club since 2007 and won six elections in a row. Melo is expected to assume office on 2 January 2024.

== Squad ==
As of 31 August 2023

Note: Flags indicate national team as defined under FIFA eligibility rules; some limited exceptions apply. Players may hold more than one non-FIFA nationality.

No.	Pos.	Nation	Player
2	DF	POR	Rafael Ramos
3	DF	BRA	Lucas Veríssimo (on loan from Benfica)
4	DF	BRA	Gil
5	MF	ARG	Fausto Vera
6	DF	BRA	Fábio Santos
7	MF	BRA	Maycon (on loan from Shakhtar Donetsk)
8	MF	BRA	Renato Augusto
9	FW	BRA	Yuri Alberto
10	MF	PAR	Matías Rojas
11	FW	PAR	Ángel Romero
12	GK	BRA	Cássio (captain)
14	DF	BRA	Caetano
15	MF	BRA	Paulinho
17	FW	BRA	Giovane
19	FW	BRA	Gustavo Silva

No.	Pos.	Nation	Player
20	MF	BRA	Giuliano
21	DF	BRA	Matheus Bidu
22	GK	BRA	Carlos Miguel
23	DF	BRA	Fagner
24	MF	COL	Víctor Cantillo
25	DF	URU	Bruno Méndez
26	MF	BRA	Guilherme Biro
27	FW	BRA	Pedro
29	MF	BRA	Roni
30	MF	BRA	Matheus Araújo
32	GK	BRA	Matheus Donelli
33	MF	BRA	Ruan Oliveira (on loan from Metropolitano)
36	FW	BRA	Wesley
44	MF	BRA	Gabriel Moscardo

== Managerial changes ==
On November 13, 2022, Corinthians' president Duílio Monteiro Alves announced that Vítor Pereira would not renew his contract to continue as the club's manager for the 2023 season. Pereira supposedly revealed that he had family issues that required his return to Portugal. He claimed in a social media post that his reasons to leave were exclusively health issues related to his mother in law. However a month later, he was announced as the new head coach of Flamengo for the 2023 season.

On November 20, head of performance analysis Fernando Lázaro was announced as the club's new manager. He was scheduled to serve as Brazil's opponents scout in the 2022 FIFA World Cup before taking the job. On April 20, 2023, Lázaro was removed from the position after a series of poor results and performances. Corinthians opted to demote him to the club's staff as a permanent assistant coach and fired his assistant's Thiago Larghi and Luciano Dias.

A few hours after removing Lázaro, Corinthians announced Cuca as the new manager until the end of the season. The signing was met with immense backlash by the club's supporters due to Cuca's conviction in 1989 by a Swiss court for allegedly raping a 13-year-old girl in a hotel room in Bern, Switzerland in 1987. He was convicted to 15 months imprisonment for "engaging in sexual act with a minor", but the sentence was not served and expired in 2004. He resigned exactly a week later, right after Corinthians' win and qualification in the third round of Copa do Brasil, citing personal reasons related to the protests to his signing. On April 28, The club decided to name current U-20 coach and former club player (2012 Copa Libertadores and 2012 FIFA Club World Cup winner) Danilo as the caretaker for their next match against rivals Palmeiras instead of Lázaro.

On May 1, Vanderlei Luxemburgo was announced as the new manager with a contract until the end of the season. It was his third spell at the club, with the last one taking place nearly 22 years ago. On September 27, Luxemburgo was fired after a recurring poor performances, most recently a 1–1 home draw against Fortaleza at the 2023 Copa Sudamericana semi-finals the day before.

The day after, Mano Menezes was announced as Corinthians' new manager with a contract until the end of the 2025 season. It will also be his third spell at the club, after being manager through 2008-2010 and 2014.

Manager	Signed from	Date of signing	Date of departure	Signed with	Source
(Portugal) Vítor Pereira	Free agent	23 February 2022	13 November 2022	(Brazil) Flamengo	
(Brazil) Fernando Lázaro	Head of performance analysis	20 November 2022	20 April 2023	Demoted to permanent assistant coach	
(Brazil) Cuca	Free agent	20 April 2023	27 April 2023	—	
(Brazil) Danilo	Corinthians U-20 head coach (caretaker)	28 April 2023	30 April 2023	Returned to the U-20 team	
(Brazil) Vanderlei Luxemburgo	Free agent	1 May 2023	27 September 2023	—	
(Brazil) Mano Menezes	Free agent	28 September 2023	—	—	

== Transfers ==
=== Transfers in ===
#	Position:	Player	Transferred from	Fee	Date	Team	Source
11	FW	(Paraguay) Ángel Romero	(Mexico) Cruz Azul	Free transfer (End of contract)	15 December 2022	First team	
21	DF	(Brazil) Matheus Bidu	(Brazil) Guarani	Undisclosed	28 December 2022	First team	
9	FW	(Brazil) Yuri Alberto	(Russia) Zenit Saint Petersburg	Traded (Note: Corinthians and Zenit Saint Petersburg reached an agreement on 10 January in which they traded Yuri Alberto (who was already on loan for a year since June 2022) for Robert Renan and Du Queiroz. Robert joined the Russian club immediately, while Queiroz joined them in July for the 2023–24 season. They also obtained a purchase-preference for 16-year-old Pedro and received a percentage of eventual transfers from two players who were on loan from the original deal in last June: Gustavo Mantuan, who was expected to return in June 2023; and Ivan, who returned immediately.)	10 January 2023	First team	
	GK	(Brazil) Ivan	(Russia) Zenit Saint Petersburg	Loan cancelled	10 January 2023	First team	
	FW	(Brazil) Rodrigo Varanda	(Cyprus) Akritas Chlorakas	Loan cancelled (Note: Rodrigo Varanda was already on loan since July 2022 until June 2023.)	12 January 2023	First team	
77	FW	(Brazil) Chrystian Barletta	(Brazil) São Bernardo	R$6,000,000	21 March 2023	First team	
	FW	(Brazil) Léo Natel	(Portugal) Casa Pia	End of loan (Note: Léo Natel was on loan since 2 September 2022 until 30 June 2023.)	1 July 2023	First team	
18	MF	(Paraguay) Matías Rojas	(Argentina) Racing	Free transfer (End of contract)	11 July 2023	First team	

=== Loans in ===
#	Position	Player	Loaned from	Date	Loan expires	Team	Source
7	MF	(Brazil) Maycon	(Ukraine) Shakhtar Donetsk	4 January 2023 (Note: Maycon was on loan since March 2022 until the end of last season.)	31 December 2023	First team	
	DF	(Brazil) João Vinicius	(Brazil) Novo Hamburgo	16 March 2023	31 December 2023	Academy	
33	MF	(Brazil) Ruan Oliveira	(Brazil) Metropolitano	15 June 2023	31 December 2023 (Note: Ruan Oliveira was already on loan since 2019 until 30 June 2023.)	First team	
3	DF	(Brazil) Lucas Veríssimo	(Portugal) Benfica	26 July 2023	30 June 2024	First team	

=== Transfers out ===
#	Position	Player	Transferred to	Fee	Date	Team	Source
21	MF	(Brazil) Mateus Vital	(Brazil) Cruzeiro	Free transfer (Rescinded contract)	14 December 2022	First team	
17	MF	(Brazil) Ramiro	(Brazil) Cruzeiro	Free transfer (End of contract)	15 December 2022	First team	
	DF	(Brazil) Danilo Avelar	(Brazil) América Mineiro	Free transfer (End of contract)	22 December 2022	First team	
6	DF	(Brazil) Lucas Piton	(Brazil) Vasco da Gama	€3,000,000 (~R$16,600,000)	28 December 2022	First team	
	MF	(Brazil) Fessin	(South Korea) Busan IPark	Free transfer (End of contract)	1 January 2023	First team	
	DF	(Brazil) Igor Morais	(Brazil) Cianorte	Free transfer (End of contract)	1 January 2023	First team	
	FW	(Brazil) Matheus Matias	Free agent	End of contract	1 January 2023	First team	
	MF	(Brazil) Thiaguinho	(Brazil) Água Santa	Free transfer (End of contract)	1 January 2023	First team	
	MF	(Brazil) Keven	(Spain) Almería	Free transfer (End of contract)	1 January 2023	Academy	
	DF	(Brazil) Lucas Belezi	Free agent	End of contract	1 January 2023	Academy	
	FW	(Brazil) Janderson	(Brazil) Ceará	Free transfer (Rescinded contract)	4 January 2023	First team	
	DF	(Brazil) Matheus Alexandre	(Brazil) Cuiabá	Free transfer (Rescinded contract)	6 January 2023	First team	
30	DF	(Brazil) Robert Renan	(Russia) Zenit Saint Petersburg	Traded	10 January 2023	First team	
	FW	(Brazil) Matheus Davó	(Brazil) Cruzeiro	R$3,500,000	11 January 2023	First team	
	MF	(Brazil) Riquelme	(Slovakia) DAC Dunajská Streda	Free transfer (Rescinded contract)	25 January 2023	Academy	
	DF	(Brazil) Alemão	(Portugal) Portimonense	Free transfer (Rescinded contract)	31 January 2023	Academy	
39	MF	(Brazil) Xavier	Free agent	End of contract	1 February 2023	First team	
	FW	(Brazil) Mindinho	(Ukraine) Dnipro-1	Free transfer (Rescinded contract)	13 February 2023	Academy	
	FW	(Brazil) Nathan	(Lithuania) FK Riteriai	Free transfer (Rescinded contract)	27 February 2023	First team	
	DF	(Brazil) Gustavo Henrique	(Brazil) Red Bull Bragantino II	Undisclosed	12 April 2023	Academy	
	GK	(Brazil) Alan Gobetti	Free agent	End of contract	1 June 2023	First team	
18	FW	(Ukraine) Júnior Moraes	Free agent	Rescinded contract	7 June 2023	First team	
	FW	(Brazil) Gustavo Mantuan	(Russia) Zenit Saint Petersburg	€2,000,000 (~R$10,405,000)	23 June 2023	First team	
37	MF	(Brazil) Du Queiroz	(Russia) Zenit Saint Petersburg	Traded	23 June 2023	First team	
31	DF	(Paraguay) Fabián Balbuena	(Russia) Dynamo Moscow	End of loan (Note: Fabián Balbuena was on loan since 18 July 2022 until 30 June 2023.)	1 July 2023	First team	
	FW	(Brazil) Everaldo	(Brazil) América Mineiro	Free transfer (End of contract)	1 July 2023	First team	
	DF	(Brazil) Reginaldo	(Brazil) Primavera	Free transfer (Rescinded contract)	12 July 2023	First team	
	DF	(Brazil) Heitor Casagrande	Free agent	End of contract	31 July 2023	First team	
77	FW	(Brazil) Chrystian Barletta	(Brazil) Ceará	R$6,600,000	31 July 2023	First team	
	FW	(Brazil) Luan	(Brazil) Grêmio	Free transfer (Rescinded contract)	1 August 2023	First team	
10	FW	(Brazil) Róger Guedes	(Qatar) Al-Rayyan	US$10,000,000 (~R$49,000,000)	9 August 2023	First team	
	MF	(Brazil) Matheus Jesus	(Japan) V-Varen Nagasaki	Free transfer (Rescinded contract)	11 August 2023	First team	
28	MF	(Brazil) Adson	(France) Nantes	€5,000,000 (~R$26,380,000)	23 August 2023	First team	
34	DF	(Brazil) Murillo	(England) Nottingham Forest	€12,000,000 (~R$64,400,000) (Note: Deal could reach up to €14,000,000 in goals.)	31 August 2023	First team	

=== Loans out ===
#	Position	Player	Loaned to	Date	Loan expires	Team	Source
	FW	(Brazil) Jonathan Cafú	(Brazil) Cuiabá	12 December 2022	31 December 2023	First team	
	MF	(Brazil) Luis Mandaca	(Brazil) Juventude	14 December 2022	31 December 2023	First team	
44	GK	(Brazil) Alan Gobetti	(Brazil) Inter de Limeira	20 December 2022	31 May 2023	First team	
	DF	(Brazil) Alan Ferreira	(Brazil) Oeste	27 December 2022	31 July 2023 (Cancelled on 16 January 2023)	First team	
	DF	(Brazil) Gabriel Araújo	(Brazil) Bangu	27 December 2022	31 March 2023	First team	
	DF	(Brazil) Kevin Emmel	(Brazil) Novo Hamburgo	27 December 2022	31 March 2023	First team	
	FW	(Brazil) Nathan	(Brazil) Nova Iguaçu	27 December 2022	31 March 2023 (Cancelled on 26 February 2023)	First team	
	DF	(Brazil) Léo Santos	(Brazil) Ferroviária	28 December 2022	31 March 2023	First team	
	FW	(Brazil) Eduardo Tanque	(Brazil) Camboriú	3 January 2023	31 March 2023	First team	
34	DF	(Brazil) Raul Gustavo	(Brazil) Bahia	4 January 2023	31 December 2023	First team	
	MF	(Brazil) Matheus Jesus	(Brazil) Ponte Preta	5 January 2023	31 December 2023 (Cancelled on 11 August 2023)	First team	
	DF	(Brazil) Reginaldo	(Brazil) Primavera	8 January 2023	8 April 2023	First team	
	GK	(Brazil) Ivan	(Brazil) Vasco da Gama	12 January 2023	31 December 2023	First team	
	DF	(Brazil) Alan Ferreira	(Brazil) América de Natal	16 January 2023	31 July 2023	First team	
	DF	(Brazil) Heitor Casagrande	(Portugal) Guarda Desportiva	18 January 2023	30 June 2023	First team	
	FW	(Brazil) Everaldo	(Brazil) América Mineiro	14 February 2023	30 June 2023	First team	
	FW	(Brazil) Rodrigo Varanda	(Brazil) América Mineiro	7 March 2023	31 January 2024	First team	
	DF	(Brazil) Léo Santos	(Brazil) Ceará	11 April 2023	31 December 2023	First team	
	DF	(Brazil) Gabriel Araújo	(Brazil) Santo André	26 April 2023	30 September 2023	First team	
	DF	(Brazil) Daniel Marcos	(Brazil) Ferroviário	28 April 2023	31 December 2023	First team	
	FW	(Brazil) Eduardo Tanque	(Brazil) Aimoré	5 May 2023	30 November 2023	First team	
	DF	(Brazil) Kevin Emmel	(Brazil) Flamengo de Guarulhos	13 May 2023	31 August 2023	First team	
	FW	(Brazil) Léo Natel	(Australia) Melbourne City	15 September 2023	30 June 2024	First team	

== Squad statistics ==
No.	Pos.	Name	Campeonato Paulista		Copa Libertadores		Campeonato Brasileiro		Copa do Brasil		Copa Sudamericana		Total		Discipline	
No.	Pos.	Name	Apps	Goals	Apps	Goals	Apps	Goals	Apps	Goals	Apps	Goals	Apps	Goals	Yellow card	Red card
2	DF	(Portugal) Rafael Ramos	2 (2)	0	1	0	0	0	0	0	2	0	5 (2)	0	0	0
3	DF	(Brazil) Lucas Veríssimo	0	0	0	0	15	1	0	0	3	0	18	1	5	1
4	DF	(Brazil) Gil	10	1	5	0	32	2	8	0	5 (1)	1	60 (1)	4	13	0
5	MF	(Argentina) Fausto Vera	3 (6)	0	6	0	17 (4)	1	7 (1)	0	1 (2)	0	34 (13)	1	9	0
6	DF	(Brazil) Fábio Santos	11 (2)	1	3 (1)	0	20 (5)	4	7 (1)	0	4 (1)	0	45 (10)	5	11	0
7	MF	(Brazil) Maycon	3 (4)	0	3 (1)	0	27 (5)	2	5 (2)	0	6 (2)	1	44 (14)	3	6	1
8	MF	(Brazil) Renato Augusto	9 (1)	1	2	0	16 (8)	2	4	3	4 (1)	0	35 (10)	6	3	0
9	FW	(Brazil) Yuri Alberto	10	4	5	0	31 (2)	8	9	1	5 (1)	2	60 (3)	15	11	0
10	MF	(Paraguay) Matías Rojas	0	0	0	0	7 (8)	0	1 (1)	0	3	0	11 (9)	0	1	0
11	FW	(Paraguay) Ángel Romero	3 (6)	0	0 (4)	0	13 (9)	8	0	0	2 (5)	0	18 (24)	8	3	0
12	GK	(Brazil) Cássio	11	0	4	0	37	0	8	0	6	0	66	0	3	0
13	DF	(Brazil) Léo Mana	0	0	0 (1)	0	2 (1)	0	0	0	0 (2)	0	2 (4)	0	1	0
14	DF	(Brazil) Caetano	1	0	1 (1)	0	13 (3)	0	0 (1)	0	3	0	18 (5)	0	4	0
15	MF	(Brazil) Paulinho	1 (7)	2	1 (3)	0	1 (3)	0	2 (1)	0	0	0	5 (14)	2	2	0
16	DF	(Brazil) Vitor Meer	0	0	0	0	0	0	0	0	0	0	0	0	0	0
17	FW	(Brazil) Giovane	0 (1)	0	0 (1)	0	1 (4)	1	0	0	0 (1)	0	1 (7)	1	0	0
19	FW	(Brazil) Gustavo Silva	0	0	0	0	1 (10)	1	0	0	0 (3)	0	1 (13)	1	2	0
20	MF	(Brazil) Giuliano	9 (4)	0	4	0	19 (11)	2	2 (3)	0	3 (4)	0	37 (22)	2	4	0
21	DF	(Brazil) Matheus Bidu	2 (1)	0	3	0	19 (5)	0	1 (2)	1	4 (1)	0	29 (9)	1	4	0
22	GK	(Brazil) Carlos Miguel	2	0	2	0	1 (1)	0	0	0	2 (1)	0	7 (2)	0	2	0
23	DF	(Brazil) Fagner	10 (1)	0	4	0	22 (8)	0	6 (2)	0	3 (1)	0	45 (12)	0	16	0
24	MF	(Colombia) Víctor Cantillo	1 (3)	0	1 (1)	0	2 (4)	0	0	0	0	0	4 (8)	0	0	0
25	DF	(Uruguay) Bruno Méndez	9 (2)	0	2	0	20 (7)	0	4 (2)	0	6 (1)	0	41 (12)	0	9	1
26	MF	(Brazil) Guilherme Biro	0	0	0 (1)	0	7 (4)	0	0 (1)	0	3 (1)	0	10 (7)	0	3	0
27	FW	(Brazil) Pedro	0 (2)	0	0 (3)	0	7 (7)	1	1	0	1	0	9 (12)	1	2	0
29	MF	(Brazil) Roni	7 (4)	0	1 (3)	0	7 (9)	0	1 (1)	0	0	0	16 (17)	0	7	0
30	MF	(Brazil) Matheus Araújo	1 (3)	0	2 (1)	1	3 (13)	1	0 (5)	0	2 (1)	0	8 (23)	2	0	0
32	GK	(Brazil) Matheus Donelli	0	0	0	0	0	0	0	0	0	0	0	0	0	1
33	MF	(Brazil) Ruan Oliveira	0	0	0	0	11 (8)	2	3 (1)	0	4 (1)	0	18 (10)	2	5	0
35	MF	(Brazil) Breno Bidon	0	0	0	0	0	0	0	0	0	0	0	0	0	0
36	FW	(Brazil) Wesley	0 (1)	0	1 (1)	0	7 (17)	1	1 (1)	0	2 (3)	1	11 (23)	2	3	0
39	MF	(Brazil) Pedrinho	0	0	0	0	0	0	0	0	0	0	0	0	0	0
41	FW	(Brazil) Felipe Augusto	0	0	1	1	2 (13)	0	0 (2)	0	2 (1)	1	5 (16)	2	0	0
44	MF	(Brazil) Gabriel Moscardo	0	0	0 (1)	0	15 (3)	1	2	0	4	0	21 (4)	1	9	0
46	DF	(Brazil) Renato	0	0	0	0	0	0	0	0	0	0	0	0	0	0
47	DF	(Brazil) João Pedro	0	0	0	0	0	0	0	0	0	0	0	0	0	0
49	MF	(Brazil) Ryan	0	0	0 (1)	0	0	0	0	0	0 (1)	1	0 (2)	1	2	1
Players transferred out during the season
10	FW	(Brazil) Róger Guedes	13	8	5	3	15	7	6 (1)	3	1	0	40 (1)	21	5	0
18	FW	(Ukraine) Júnior Moraes	1 (2)	0	0	0	0 (1)	0	0	0	0	0	1 (3)	0	0	0
28	MF	(Brazil) Adson	10 (1)	3	3 (1)	1	9 (6)	0	4 (3)	1	4	0	30 (11)	5	5	0
31	DF	(Paraguay) Fabián Balbuena	6 (1)	0	2	1	1	0	0	0	0	0	9 (1)	1	1	0
34	DF	(Brazil) Murillo	0	0	4	0	13	0	6 (1)	0	3	0	26 (1)	0	7	0
37	MF	(Brazil) Du Queiroz	8 (2)	0	0 (3)	0	2 (1)	0	1	0	0	0	11 (6)	0	2	0
77	FW	(Brazil) Chrystian Barletta	0	0	0	0	2 (1)	0	0 (2)	0	0	0	2 (3)	0	1	0

== Overview ==
Competition	First match	Last match	Starting round	Final position	Record							
Competition	First match	Last match	Starting round	Final position	Pld	W	D	L	GF	GA	GD	Win %
Série A	16 April 2023	6 December 2023	Matchday 1	13th place	38	12	14	12	47	48	−1	31.58
Copa do Brasil	12 April 2023	16 August 2023	Third round	Semi-finals	8	4	0	4	9	10	−1	50.00
Campeonato Paulista	15 January 2023	12 March 2023	Matchday 1	Quarter-finals	13	6	5	2	20	11	+9	46.15
Copa Libertadores	6 April 2023	28 June 2023	Group stage	Group stage	6	2	1	3	7	6	+1	33.33
Copa Sudamericana	11 July 2023	3 October 2023	Knockout round play-offs	Semi-finals	8	4	2	2	7	6	+1	50.00
Total					73	28	22	23	90	81	+9	38.36

Source: Competitions

== Campeonato Paulista ==
For the 2023 Campeonato Paulista, the 16 teams were divided in four groups of 4 teams (A, B, C, D). They faced all teams, except those that were in their own group, with the top two teams from each group qualifying for the quarterfinals. The two overall worst teams were relegated.

=== First stage ===
Pos	Team	Pld	W	D	L	GF	GA	GD	Pts	Qualification or relegation
1	Corinthians	12	6	4	2	19	10	+9	22	Knockout stage
2	Ituano	12	3	3	6	11	18	−7	12	Knockout stage
3	São Bento (R)	12	2	4	6	5	14	−9	10	Relegation to Série A2
4	Ferroviária (R)	12	2	3	7	11	18	−7	9	Relegation to Série A2

Source: Soccerway
(R) Relegated

15 January 2023 1	Red Bull Bragantino	1–0	Corinthians	Bragança Paulista
16:00 UTC−3	Artur 75'	Report		Stadium: Estádio Nabi Abi Chedid; Attendance: 10,451; Referee: Raphael Claus

18 January 2023 2	Corinthians	3–0	Água Santa	São Paulo
19:30 UTC−3	Yuri Alberto 21'; Róger Guedes 39', 70'	Report		Stadium: Neo Química Arena; Attendance: 37,972; Referee: Thiago Luis Scarascati

21 January 2023 3	Inter de Limeira	0–0	Corinthians	Limeira
18:30 UTC−3		Report		Stadium: Estádio Major José Levy Sobrinho; Attendance: 14,725; Referee: Douglas Marques das Flores

24 January 2023 4	Corinthians	2–1	Guarani	São Paulo
20:00 UTC−3	Róger Guedes 45+2'; Fábio Santos 52'	Report	Bruninho 1'	Stadium: Neo Química Arena; Attendance: 39,441; Referee: Luiz Flávio de Oliveira

29 January 2023 5	São Paulo	1–2	Corinthians	São Paulo
18:30 UTC−3	Luciano 78'	Report	Adson 18', 34'	Stadium: Morumbi; Attendance: 54,970; Referee: Raphael Claus

5 February 2023 6	Corinthians	2–0	Botafogo	São Paulo
18:30 UTC−3	Róger Guedes 30'; Adson 36'	Report		Stadium: Neo Química Arena; Attendance: 41,804; Referee: Edina Alves Batista

9 February 2023 7	São Bernardo	2–0	Corinthians	São Bernardo do Campo
21:30 UTC−3	Vitinho 5' (pen.); João Carlos 49'	Report		Stadium: Estádio 1º de Maio; Attendance: 12,362; Referee: João Vitor Gobi

12 February 2023 8	Portuguesa	0–0	Corinthians	Brasília (Distrito Federal)
16:00 UTC−3		Report		Stadium: Arena BRB Mané Garrincha (Note: Portuguesa played their home match at Arena BRB Mané Garrincha, Brasília, Distrito Federal instead of their regular stadium Estádio do Canindé, São Paulo.); Attendance: 26,004; Referee: Douglas Marques das Flores

16 February 2023 9	Corinthians	2–2	Palmeiras	São Paulo
21:30 UTC−3	Róger Guedes 9'; Gil 78'	Report	Rony 43', 53'	Stadium: Neo Química Arena; Attendance: 45,528; Referee: Raphael Claus

19 February 2023 10	Corinthians	3–0	Mirassol	São Paulo
18:30 UTC−3	Róger Guedes 10', 57'; Renato Augusto 45+1'	Report		Stadium: Neo Química Arena; Attendance: 37,104; Referee: Matheus Delgado Candançan

26 February 2023 11	Santos	2–2	Corinthians	Santos
16:00 UTC−3	Lucas Barbosa 45+6'; Marcos Leonardo 90' (pen.)	Report	Yuri Alberto 32'; Róger Guedes 67'	Stadium: Vila Belmiro; Attendance: 13,051; Referee: Edina Alves Batista

4 March 2023 12	Corinthians	3–1	Santo André	São Paulo
18:30 UTC−3	Yuri Alberto 40', 64'; Paulinho 60'	Report	José Hugo 31'	Stadium: Neo Química Arena; Attendance: 43,124; Referee: Guilherme Nunes de Santana
Note: The match was originally scheduled for 5 March, but it was anticipated due to a Federação Paulista de Futebol table adjustment.

=== Knockout stages ===
12 March 2023 Quarter-finals	Corinthians	1–1 (6–7 p)	Ituano	São Paulo
16:00 UTC−3	Paulinho 35'	Report	Raí Ramos 26'	Stadium: Neo Química Arena; Attendance: 43,888; Referee: Raphael Claus
	Penalties
	Fábio Santos (penalty missed); Giuliano (penalty scored); Vera (penalty scored); Yuri Alberto (penalty scored); Róger Guedes (penalty scored); Maycon (penalty scored); Méndez (penalty scored); Fagner (penalty missed); Gil (penalty missed)		(penalty scored) Eduardo Person; (penalty scored) José Aldo; (penalty scored) Rafael Pereira; (penalty missed) Raí Ramos; (penalty scored) Claudinho; (penalty scored) Jefferson Paulino; (penalty scored) Lucas Siqueira; (penalty missed) Mário Sérgio; (penalty scored) Felipe Saraiva

== Copa Libertadores ==
=== Group stage ===
Pos	Team	Pld	W	D	L	GF	GA	GD	Pts	Qualification	IDV	ARG	COR	LIV
1	(Ecuador) Independiente del Valle	6	4	0	2	10	5	+5	12	Advance to round of 16	—	3–2	3–0	2–0
2	(Argentina) Argentinos Juniors	6	3	2	1	8	6	+2	11	Advance to round of 16	1–0	—	0–0	2–1
3	(Brazil) Corinthians	6	2	1	3	7	6	+1	7	Transfer to Copa Sudamericana	1–2	0–1	—	3–0
4	(Uruguay) Liverpool	6	1	1	4	4	12	−8	4		1–0	2–2	0–3	—

Source: CONMEBOL
Rules for classification: 1) Points; 2) Goal difference; 3) Goals scored; 4) Away goals scored; 5) CONMEBOL ranking.

6 April 2023 1	Liverpool (Uruguay)	0–3	(Brazil) Corinthians	Montevideo, Uruguay
19:00 UTC−3		Report	Balbuena 45+1'; Róger Guedes 49', 63'	Stadium: Estadio Centenario (Note: Liverpool played their home match at Estadio Centenario, Montevideo instead of their regular stadium Estadio Belvedere, Montevideo, which did not meet CONMEBOL requirements.); Attendance: 2,348; Referee: Andrés Rojas (Colombia)

19 April 2023 2	Corinthians (Brazil)	0–1	(Argentina) Argentinos Juniors	São Paulo, Brazil
21:30 UTC−3		Report	Cabrera 13'	Stadium: Neo Química Arena; Attendance: 40,670; Referee: Jesús Valenzuela (Venezuela)

2 May 2023 3	Corinthians (Brazil)	1–2	(Ecuador) Independiente del Valle	São Paulo, Brazil
21:00 UTC−3	Róger Guedes 35'	Report	Díaz 22', 52'	Stadium: Neo Química Arena; Attendance: 39,984; Referee: Piero Maza (Chile)

24 May 2023 4	Argentinos Juniors (Argentina)	0–0	(Brazil) Corinthians	Buenos Aires, Argentina
21:30 UTC−3		Report		Stadium: Estadio Diego Armando Maradona; Attendance: 21,830; Referee: Carlos Ortega (Colombia)

7 June 2023 5	Independiente del Valle (Ecuador)	3–0	(Brazil) Corinthians	Quito, Ecuador
17:00 UTC−5	Hoyos 17', 24'; Sornoza 69'	Report		Stadium: Estadio Banco Guayaquil; Attendance: 4,563; Referee: Alexis Herrera (Venezuela)
Note: The match was originally scheduled for 8 June, but it was anticipated by CONMEBOL due to undisclosed reasons.

28 June 2023 6	Corinthians (Brazil)	3–0	(Uruguay) Liverpool	São Paulo, Brazil
21:30 UTC−3	Matheus Araújo 32'; Felipe Augusto 64'; Adson 80'	Report		Stadium: Neo Química Arena; Attendance: 26,556; Referee: Ángel Arteaga (Venezuela)

== Campeonato Brasileiro ==
Pos	Team	Pld	W	D	L	GF	GA	GD	Pts	Qualification or relegation
11	São Paulo	38	14	11	13	40	38	+2	53	Qualification for Copa Libertadores group stage (Note: São Paulo qualified for the Copa Libertadores group stage by winning the 2023 Copa do Brasil.)
12	Cuiabá	38	14	9	15	40	39	+1	51	Qualification for Copa Sudamericana group stage
13	Corinthians	38	12	14	12	47	48	−1	50	Qualification for Copa Sudamericana group stage
14	Cruzeiro	38	11	14	13	35	32	+3	47	Qualification for Copa Sudamericana group stage
15	Vasco da Gama	38	12	9	17	41	51	−10	45	

Source: CBF
Rules for classification: 1) points; 2) wins; 3) goal difference; 4) goals scored; 5) head-to-head results (only between two teams); 6) fewest red cards; 7) fewest yellow cards; 8) drawing of lots.

=== Result by round ===
Round	1	2	3	4	5	6	7	8	9	10	11	12	13	14	16	17	18	19	20	21	22	23	15^{1}	24	25	26	27	28	29	30	31	32	33	34	35	36	37	38
Ground	H	A	A	H	A	H	A	H	A	H	A	A	H	A	A	H	A	H	A	H	H	A	H	H	A	H	A	H	A	H	H	A	H	A	H	A	H	A
Result	W	L	L	D	L	D	L	W	L	D	W	L	L	W	D	W	D	W	D	D	D	L	D	W	L	D	D	D	W	D	W	L	D	W	L	W	L	W
Position	6	14	17	15	16	17	18	14	16	16	15	15	16	15	15	14	14	14	13	13	13	14	14	10	13	14	13	15	14	14	12	13	14	11	14	13	13	13
Points	3	3	3	4	4	5	5	8	8	9	12	12	12	15	16	19	20	23	24	25	26	26	27	30	30	31	32	33	36	37	40	40	41	44	44	47	47	50

Updated to match(es) played on 6 December 2023. Source: CBF
A = Away; H = Home; W = Win; D = Draw; L = Loss; P = Postponed
Notes:
- ^{1} Matchday 15 (vs. Grêmio) was postponed due to table adjustments for Corinthians' participation in the 2023 Copa Sudamericana knockout round play-offs on 11 July and 2023 Copa do Brasil quarter-finals on July 15 as a result.

=== Matches ===
16 April 2023 1	Corinthians	2–1	Cruzeiro	São Paulo
16:00 UTC−3	Matheus Araújo 68'; Róger Guedes 87'	Report	Lucas Oliveira 90+5'	Stadium: Neo Química Arena; Attendance: 41,716; Referee: Anderson Daronco

23 April 2023 2	Goiás	3–1	Corinthians	Goiânia
19:00 UTC−3	Matheus Peixoto 31'; Lucas Halter 80'; Apodi 90+4'	Report	Róger Guedes 17'	Stadium: Estádio da Serrinha; Attendance: 10,162; Referee: Bruno Arleu de Araújo

29 April 2023 3	Palmeiras	2–1	Corinthians	São Paulo
18:30 UTC−3	Murilo 16'; Raphael Veiga 36'	Report	Piquerez 76' (o.g.)	Stadium: Allianz Parque; Attendance: 41,457; Referee: Wilton Sampaio

8 May 2023 4	Corinthians	1–1	Fortaleza	São Paulo
20:00 UTC−3	Yuri Alberto 88'	Report	Caio Alexandre 79'	Stadium: Neo Química Arena; Attendance: 36,512; Referee: Ramon Abatti Abel

11 May 2023 5	Botafogo	3–0	Corinthians	Rio de Janeiro
19:30 UTC−3	Tiquinho Soares 12', 65' (pen.); Eduardo 81'	Report		Stadium: Estádio Olímpico Nilton Santos; Attendance: 22,388; Referee: Anderson Daronco

14 May 2023 6	Corinthians	1–1	São Paulo	São Paulo
16:00 UTC−3	Róger Guedes 45+6' (pen.)	Report	Araújo 15'	Stadium: Neo Química Arena; Attendance: 41,434; Referee: Bruno Arleu de Araújo

21 May 2023 7	Flamengo	1–0	Corinthians	Rio de Janeiro
16:00 UTC−3	Léo Pereira 90+4'	Report		Stadium: Maracanã; Attendance: 64,871; Referee: Rafael Rodrigo Klein

28 May 2023 8	Corinthians	2–0	Fluminense	São Paulo
16:00 UTC−3	Róger Guedes 59', 90+2'	Report		Stadium: Neo Química Arena; Attendance: 34,624; Referee: Leandro Vuaden

3 June 2023 9	América Mineiro	2–0	Corinthians	Belo Horizonte
18:30 UTC−3	Avelar 74' (pen.); Renato Marques 87'	Report		Stadium: Arena Independência; Attendance: 14,678; Referee: Anderson Daronco

10 June 2023 10	Corinthians	1–1	Cuiabá	São Paulo
18:30 UTC−3	Ruan Oliveira 81'	Report	Deyverson 55'	Stadium: Neo Química Arena; Attendance: 40,512; Referee: André Luiz Skettino Policarpo Bento

21 June 2023 11	Santos	0–2	Corinthians	Santos
20:00 UTC−3		Report	Yuri Alberto 19'; Ruan Oliveira 28'	Stadium: Vila Belmiro; Attendance: 12,499; Referee: Leandro Vuaden

24 June 2023 12	Athletico Paranaense	1–0	Corinthians	Curitiba
16:00 UTC−3	Vitor Roque 36'	Report		Stadium: Ligga Arena; Attendance: 30,144; Referee: Wagner do Nascimento Magalhães

2 July 2023 13	Corinthians	0–1	Red Bull Bragantino	São Paulo
11:00 UTC−3		Report	Eduardo Sasha 17'	Stadium: Neo Química Arena; Attendance: 42,404; Referee: Edina Alves Batista

8 July 2023 14	Atlético Mineiro	0–1	Corinthians	Belo Horizonte
18:30 UTC−3		Report	Róger Guedes 40'	Stadium: Mineirão; Attendance: 21,086; Referee: Rodrigo José Pereira de Lima
Note: The match was originally scheduled for 9 July, but it was anticipated due to Corinthians' participation in the 2023 Copa Sudamericana knockout round play-offs on 11 July.

22 July 2023 16	Bahia	0–0	Corinthians	Salvador
18:30 UTC−3		Report		Stadium: Itaipava Arena Fonte Nova; Attendance: 43,716; Referee: André Luiz Skettino Policarpo Bento

29 July 2023 17	Corinthians	3–1	Vasco da Gama	São Paulo
18:30 UTC−3	Maycon 19'; Yuri Alberto 61'; Róger Guedes 73' (pen.)	Report	Gabriel Pec 71'	Stadium: Neo Química Arena; Attendance: 0 Referee: Leandro Vuaden
Note: Corinthians played this match behind closed doors due to homophobic chants on their match against São Paulo on 14 May.

5 August 2023 18	Internacional	2–2	Corinthians	Porto Alegre
18:30 UTC−3	Bruno Henrique 17'; Luiz Adriano 90+9'	Report	Renato Augusto 13'; Fábio Santos 86' (pen.)	Stadium: Estádio Beira-Rio; Attendance: 22,509; Referee: Wagner do Nascimento Magalhães

13 August 2023 19	Corinthians	3–1	Coritiba	São Paulo
16:00 UTC−3	Gil 51'; Yuri Alberto 54'; Wesley 67'	Report	Murillo 28' (o.g.)	Stadium: Neo Química Arena; Attendance: 42,171; Referee: Ramon Abatti Abel

19 August 2023 20	Cruzeiro	1–1	Corinthians	Belo Horizonte
21:00 UTC−3	Rafael Elias 45'	Report	Gustavo Silva 90+8'	Stadium: Mineirão; Attendance: 36,202; Referee: Rafael Rodrigo Klein

26 August 2023 21	Corinthians	1–1	Goiás	São Paulo
21:00 UTC−3	Maycon 82'	Report	Guilherme 59' (pen.)	Stadium: Neo Química Arena; Attendance: 37,316; Referee: Paulo Cesar Zanovelli da Silva

3 September 2023 22	Corinthians	0–0	Palmeiras	São Paulo
16:00 UTC−3		Report		Stadium: Neo Química Arena; Attendance: 44,371; Referee: Anderson Daronco

14 September 2023 23	Fortaleza	2–1	Corinthians	Fortaleza
19:00 UTC−3	Lucero 26'; Yago Pikachu 90+4'	Report	Pedro 33'	Stadium: Arena Castelão; Attendance: 32,690; Referee: Rodrigo José Pereira de Lima
Note: The match was originally scheduled for 13 September, but it was postponed due to Corinthians' match against Grêmio being rescheduled.

18 September 2023 15	Corinthians	4–4	Grêmio	São Paulo
21:00 UTC−3	Fábio Santos 45' (pen.); Lucas Veríssimo 45+4'; Yuri Alberto 45+6'; Giuliano 67'	Report	Nathan 21'; Cristaldo 27'; Everton Galdino 51'; Suárez 58'	Stadium: Neo Química Arena; Attendance: 36,076; Referee: Wilton Sampaio
Note: The match was originally scheduled for 15 July, but it was indefinitely postponed due to table adjustments for Corinthians' participation in the 2023 Copa Sudamericana knockout round play-offs on 11 July and 2023 Copa do Brasil quarter-finals on July 15 as a result. On August 25, CBF announced 18 September as the new date.

22 September 2023 24	Corinthians	1–0	Botafogo	São Paulo
20:00 UTC−3	Gil 59'	Report		Stadium: Neo Química Arena; Attendance: 37,543; Referee: Paulo Cesar Zanovelli da Silva
Note: The match was originally scheduled for 20 September, but it was postponed due to Corinthians' match against Grêmio being rescheduled.

30 September 2023 25	São Paulo	2–1	Corinthians	São Paulo
18:30 UTC−3	Calleri 40', 45+2'	Report	Romero 3'	Stadium: Estádio do Morumbi; Attendance: 56,735; Referee: Flávio Rodrigues de Souza

7 October 2023 26	Corinthians	1–1	Flamengo	São Paulo
21:00 UTC−3	Fábio Santos 79' (pen.)	Report	Gerson 54'	Stadium: Neo Química Arena; Attendance: 40,800; Referee: Anderson Daronco

19 October 2023 27	Fluminense	3–3	Corinthians	Rio de Janeiro
21:30 UTC−3	Lima 22', 56'; Arias 83'	Report	Yuri Alberto 10', 27'; Fábio Santos 32' (pen.)	Stadium: Maracanã; Attendance: 36,916; Referee: Paulo Cesar Zanovelli da Silva
Note: The match was originally scheduled for 18 October, but it was postponed due to table adjustments.

22 October 2023 28	Corinthians	1–1	América Mineiro	São Paulo
18:30 UTC−3	Giuliano 90+9'	Report	Benítez 38'	Stadium: Neo Química Arena; Attendance: 38,121; Referee: Yuri Elino Ferreira da Cruz
Note: The match was originally scheduled for 21 October, but it was postponed due to table adjustments.

25 October 2023 29	Cuiabá	0–1	Corinthians	Cuiabá
20:30 UTC−4		Report	Romero 77'	Stadium: Arena Pantanal; Attendance: 36,620; Referee: André Luiz Skettino Policarpo Bento
Note: The match was originally scheduled for 24 October, but it was postponed due to table adjustments.

29 October 2023 30	Corinthians	1–1	Santos	São Paulo
18:30 UTC−3	Jean Lucas 57' (o.g.)	Report	Mendoza 90+9' (pen.)	Stadium: Neo Química Arena; Attendance: 42,248; Referee: Anderson Daronco

1 November 2023 31	Corinthians	1–0	Athletico Paranaense	São Paulo
19:00 UTC−3	Yuri Alberto 64'	Report		Stadium: Neo Química Arena; Attendance: 29,870; Referee: Leandro Vuaden

5 November 2023 32	Red Bull Bragantino	1–0	Corinthians	Bragança Paulista
16:00 UTC−3	Helinho 29'	Report		Stadium: Estádio Nabi Abi Chedid; Attendance: 10,797; Referee: Raphael Claus

9 November 2023 33	Corinthians	1–1	Atlético Mineiro	São Paulo
19:00 UTC−3	Romero 23'	Report	Paulinho 67'	Stadium: Neo Química Arena; Attendance: 30,348; Referee: Bráulio da Silva Machado

12 November 2023 34	Grêmio	0–1	Corinthians	Porto Alegre
16:00 UTC−3		Report	Romero 32'	Stadium: Arena do Grêmio; Attendance: 51,842; Referee: Rodrigo José Pereira de Lima

24 November 2023 35	Corinthians	1–5	Bahia	São Paulo
21:00 UTC−3	Renato Augusto 67'	Report	Rezende 4'; Cauly 16'; Thaciano 29' (pen.), 85' (pen.); Ademir 75'	Stadium: Neo Química Arena; Attendance: 39,403; Referee: Marcelo de Lima Henrique
Note: The match was originally scheduled for 25 November, but it was anticipated due to broadcast adjustments.

28 November 2023 36	Vasco da Gama	2–4	Corinthians	Rio de Janeiro
21:30 UTC−3	Rodríguez 4'; Vegetti 25'	Report	Romero 13', 45'; Moscardo 61'; Giovane 90+4'	Stadium: Estádio São Januário; Attendance: 20,577; Referee: Sávio Pereira Sampaio

2 December 2023 37	Corinthians	1–2	Internacional	São Paulo
18:00 UTC−3	Romero 57'	Report	Maurício 35'; Wanderson 66'	Stadium: Neo Química Arena; Attendance: 40,583; Referee: Caio Max Augusto Vieira

6 December 2023 38	Coritiba	0–2	Corinthians	Curitiba
21:30 UTC−3		Report	Vera 11'; Romero 21'	Stadium: Estádio Couto Pereira; Attendance: 0 Referee: Jonathan Benkenstein Pinheiro
Note: Coritiba played this match behind closed doors due to conflicts between their torcidas organizadas and Cruzeiro's during a match on 11 November in Curitiba.

== Copa do Brasil ==
=== Preliminary stages ===
12 April 2023 Third round	Remo	2–0	Corinthians	Belém
21:30 UTC−3	Franco 13'; Muriqui 61'	Report		Stadium: Mangueirão (Note: Remo played their home match at Mangueirão, Belém instead of their regular stadium Baenão, Belém.); Attendance: 42,599; Referee: Ramon Abatti Abel

26 April 2023 Third round	Corinthians	2–0 (2–2 agg.) (5–4 p)	Remo	São Paulo
21:30 UTC−3	Adson 2'; Róger Guedes 90+3'	Report		Stadium: Neo Química Arena; Attendance: 39,638; Referee: Paulo Cesar Zanovelli da Silva
	Penalties
	Yuri Alberto (penalty scored); Maycon (penalty scored); Vera (penalty scored); Matheus Bidu (penalty scored); Róger Guedes (penalty scored)		(penalty scored) Ícaro; (penalty missed) Leonan; (penalty scored) Anderson Uchôa; (penalty scored) Muriqui; (penalty scored) Claudinei

=== Knockout stages ===
17 May 2023 Round of 16	Atlético Mineiro	2–0	Corinthians	Belo Horizonte
21:30 UTC−3	Paulinho 66', 79'	Report		Stadium: Mineirão; Attendance: 48,112; Referee: Bráulio da Silva Machado

31 May 2023 Round of 16	Corinthians	2–0 (2–2 agg.) (3–1 p)	Atlético Mineiro	São Paulo
21:30 UTC−3	Matheus Bidu 32'; Róger Guedes 64'	Report		Stadium: Neo Química Arena; Attendance: 38,235; Referee: Wilton Sampaio
	Penalties
	Fábio Santos (penalty scored); Yuri Alberto (penalty missed); Vera (penalty scored); Maycon (penalty scored)		(penalty missed) Hulk; (penalty missed) Edenílson; (penalty scored) Paulinho; (penalty missed) Battaglia

5 July 2023 Quarter-finals	América Mineiro	1–0	Corinthians	Belo Horizonte
21:30 UTC−3	Juninho 31'	Report		Stadium: Arena Independência; Attendance: 7,141; Referee: Leandro Vuaden

15 July 2023 Quarter-finals	Corinthians	3–2 (3–3 agg.) (3–1 p)	América Mineiro	São Paulo
16:30 UTC−3	Renato Augusto 47'; Yuri Alberto 65'; Róger Guedes 72'	Report	Benítez 69'; Mastriani 83'	Stadium: Neo Química Arena; Attendance: 45,004; Referee: Ramon Abatti Abel
	Penalties
	Fábio Santos (penalty scored); Giuliano (penalty scored); Adson (penalty missed); Yuri Alberto (penalty scored)		(penalty scored) Mastriani; (penalty missed) Marcinho; (penalty missed) Paulinho Bóia; (penalty missed) Benítez
Note: The match was originally scheduled for 12 July, but it was postponed due to Corinthians' participation in the 2023 Copa Sudamericana knockout round play-offs on 11 July.

25 July 2023 Semi-finals	Corinthians	2–1	São Paulo	São Paulo
21:30 UTC−3	Renato Augusto 48', 81'	Report	Luciano 55'	Stadium: Neo Química Arena; Attendance: 46,965; Referee: Wilton Sampaio

16 August 2023 Semi-finals	São Paulo	2–0 (3–2 agg.)	Corinthians	São Paulo
19:30 UTC−3	Wellington Rato 13'; Lucas Moura 32'	Report		Stadium: Morumbi; Attendance: 62,093; Referee: Raphael Claus

== Copa Sudamericana ==
=== Knockout stages ===
11 July 2023 Knockout round play-offs	Corinthians (Brazil)	1–0	(Peru) Universitario	São Paulo, Brazil
21:30 UTC−3	Felipe Augusto 79'	Report		Stadium: Neo Química Arena; Attendance: 36,807; Referee: Jesús Valenzuela (Venezuela)

18 July 2023 Knockout round play-offs	Universitario (Peru)	1–2 (1–3 agg.)	(Brazil) Corinthians	Lima, Peru
19:30 UTC−5	Flores 76' (pen.)	Report	Maycon 69'; Ryan 90+2'	Stadium: Estadio Monumental; Attendance: 46,811; Referee: Wilmar Roldán (Colombia)

1 August 2023 Round of 16	Corinthians (Brazil)	2–1	(Argentina) Newell's Old Boys	São Paulo, Brazil
21:30 UTC−3	Yuri Alberto 57' (pen.); Wesley 65'	Report	Portillo 45+4'	Stadium: Neo Química Arena; Attendance: 40,251; Referee: Gustavo Tejera (Uruguay)

8 August 2023 Round of 16	Newell's Old Boys (Argentina)	0–0 (1–2 agg.)	(Brazil) Corinthians	Rosario, Argentina
21:30 UTC−3		Report		Stadium: Estadio Marcelo Bielsa; Attendance: Undisclosed; Referee: Andrés Rojas (Colombia)

22 August 2023 Quarter-finals	Corinthians (Brazil)	1–0	(Argentina) Estudiantes	São Paulo, Brazil
21:30 UTC−3	Gil 17'	Report		Stadium: Neo Química Arena; Attendance: 35,699; Referee: Jesús Valenzuela (Venezuela)

29 August 2023 Quarter-finals	Estudiantes (Argentina)	1–0 (1–1 agg.) (2–3 p)	(Brazil) Corinthians	La Plata, Argentina
21:30 UTC−3	Méndez 2'	Report		Stadium: Estadio Jorge Luis Hirschi; Attendance: 23,082; Referee: Wilmar Roldán (Colombia)
	Penalties
	Sosa (penalty scored); Rollheiser (penalty missed); Lollo (penalty missed); Méndez (penalty scored); Ascacíbar (penalty missed)		(penalty scored) Fábio Santos; (penalty missed) Giuliano; (penalty scored) Vera; (penalty scored) Rojas

26 September 2023 Semi-finals	Corinthians (Brazil)	1–1	(Brazil) Fortaleza	São Paulo, Brazil
21:30 UTC−3	Yuri Alberto 40'	Report	José Welison 22'	Stadium: Neo Química Arena; Attendance: 42,398; Referee: Esteban Ostojich (Uruguay)

3 October 2023 Semi-finals	Fortaleza (Brazil)	2–0 (3–1 agg.)	(Brazil) Corinthians	Fortaleza, Brazil
21:30 UTC−3	Yago Pikachu 49'; Tinga 55'	Report		Stadium: Castelão; Attendance: 60,451; Referee: Andrés Rojas (Colombia)

== See also ==
- List of Sport Club Corinthians Paulista seasons
