= 2022 Sport Club Corinthians Paulista season =

Corinthians 2022 football season

Corinthians
2022 season
- President: Duílio Monteiro Alves
- Manager: Sylvinho (until 2 February); Fernando Lázaro (caretaker, 3 February – 22 February); Vítor Pereira (from 23 February)
- Stadium: Neo Química Arena
- Série A: 4th
- Copa do Brasil: Runners-up
- Campeonato Paulista: Semi-finals
- Copa Libertadores: Quarter-finals
- Top goalscorer: League: Róger Guedes (10); All: Róger Guedes (15)
- Highest home attendance: 47,031 vs Flamengo (12 October 2022)
- Lowest home attendance: 21,145 vs São Bernardo (16 February 2022)
- Average home league attendance: 39,028
Home colors	Away colors	Third colors

The 2022 season was the 113th season in the history of Sport Club Corinthians Paulista. The season covered the period from January 2022 to November 2022, a shorter season due to the 2022 FIFA World Cup.

== Background ==
=== Kits ===
- Home (26 April 2022 onward): White shirt, black shorts and white socks;
- Away (8 May 2022 onward): Black shirt, white shorts and black socks;
- Third (7 October 2022 onward): Beige shirt with shodō stripes, black shorts and beige socks.

=== Previous Kits ===
- Home (Until 25 April 2022): White shirt, black shorts and white socks;
- Away (Until 7 May 2022): Black with white stripes shirt, white shorts and black socks;
- Third (Until 6 October 2022): Purple shirt, purple shorts and purple socks.

== Squad ==
As of 2 September 2022

Note: Flags indicate national team as defined under FIFA eligibility rules; some limited exceptions apply. Players may hold more than one non-FIFA nationality.

No.	Pos.	Nation	Player
2	DF	POR	Rafael Ramos
3	DF	BRA	Robson Bambu (on loan from Nice)
4	DF	BRA	Gil
5	MF	BRA	Maycon (on loan from Shakhtar Donetsk)
6	DF	BRA	Lucas Piton
8	MF	BRA	Renato Augusto
9	FW	BRA	Yuri Alberto (on loan from Zenit St. Petersburg)
10	FW	BRA	Róger Guedes
11	MF	BRA	Giuliano
12	GK	BRA	Cássio (captain)
14	MF	BRA	Guilherme Biro
15	MF	BRA	Paulinho
17	MF	BRA	Ramiro
18	FW	UKR	Júnior Moraes
19	FW	BRA	Gustavo Silva
20	MF	BRA	Matheus Araújo
21	MF	BRA	Mateus Vital
22	GK	BRA	Carlos Miguel

No.	Pos.	Nation	Player
23	DF	BRA	Fagner
24	MF	COL	Víctor Cantillo
25	DF	URU	Bruno Méndez
26	DF	BRA	Fábio Santos
27	DF	BRA	Bruno Melo (on loan from Fortaleza)
28	MF	BRA	Adson
29	MF	BRA	Roni
30	DF	BRA	Robert Renan
31	DF	PAR	Fabián Balbuena (on loan from Dynamo Moscow)
32	GK	BRA	Matheus Donelli
33	MF	ARG	Fausto Vera
34	DF	BRA	Raul Gustavo
37	MF	BRA	Du Queiroz
39	MF	BRA	Xavier
41	FW	BRA	Felipe Augusto
42	FW	BRA	Giovane
47	FW	BRA	Wesley

== Managerial changes ==
On February 2, Sylvinho was fired after losing a home match at the 2022 Campeonato Paulista against Santos at Neo Química Arena. Assistant coach Fernando Lázaro was announced as caretaker afterwards.

On February 23, Portuguese manager Vítor Pereira was announced as the club's new manager until the end of the season. He made his debut on March 5 against rivals São Paulo.

Manager	Signed from	Date of signing	Date of departure	Signed with	Source
(Brazil) Sylvinho	Free agent	23 May 2021	2 February 2022	—	
(Brazil) Fernando Lázaro	Assistant coach (caretaker)	3 February 2022	22 February 2022	—	
(Portugal) Vítor Pereira	Free agent	23 February 2022	—	—	

== Transfers ==
=== Transfers in ===
#	Position:	Player	Transferred from	Fee	Date	Team	Source
15	MF	(Brazil) Paulinho	Free agent	Free transfer	15 December 2021	First team	
1	GK	(Brazil) Ivan	(Brazil) Ponte Preta	Undisclosed	31 January 2022	First team	
18	FW	(Ukraine) Júnior Moraes	(Ukraine) Shaktar Donetsk	Free transfer (End of contract) (Note: Júnior Moraes had contract with Shaktar Donetsk until 30 June 2022. However, due to 2022 Russian invasion of Ukraine, he was allowed to end his contract earlier.)	16 March 2022	First team	
21	DF	(Portugal) Rafael Ramos	(Portugal) Santa Clara	Undisclosed	12 April 2022	First team	
25	DF	(Uruguay) Bruno Méndez	(Brazil) Internacional	End of loan	21 June 2022	First team	
38	FW	(Brazil) Léo Natel	(Cyprus) APOEL	End of loan	1 July 2022	First team	
	FW	(Brazil) Madson	(Portugal) Estrela da Amadora	End of loan	1 July 2022	First team	
21	MF	(Brazil) Mateus Vital	(Greece) Panathinaikos	End of loan	1 July 2022	First team	
	FW	(Brazil) Nathan	(Spain) Racing de Ferrol	End of loan	1 July 2022	First team	
17	MF	(Brazil) Ramiro	(United Arab Emirates) Al-Wasl	End of loan	1 July 2022	First team	
33	MF	(Argentina) Fausto Vera	(Argentina) Argentinos Juniors	Undisclosed (U$5-8,000,000 ~R$27-42,800,000)	26 July 2022	First team	
42	FW	(Brazil) Giovane	(Brazil) Capivariano	R$3,000,000 (Note: Giovane was already on loan since July 2021 until July 2022.)	28 July 2022	First team	

=== Loans in ===
#	Position	Player	Loaned from	Date	Loan expires	Team	Source
27	DF	(Brazil) Bruno Melo	(Brazil) Fortaleza	17 January 2022	31 December 2022	First team	
3	DF	(Brazil) Robson Bambu	(France) Nice	20 January 2022	31 December 2022	First team	
5	MF	(Brazil) Maycon	(Ukraine) Shakhtar Donetsk	31 March 2022	31 December 2022	First team	
7	FW	(Brazil) Yuri Alberto	(Russia) Zenit Saint Petersburg	29 June 2022	30 June 2023	First team	
31	DF	(Paraguay) Fabián Balbuena	(Russia) Dynamo Moscow	18 July 2022	30 June 2023 (Note: Fabián Balbuena suspended his contract with Dynamo Moscow for one year due to a FIFA employment rule as a result of the 2022 Russian invasion of Ukraine.)	First team	
	MF	(Brazil) Ruan	(Brazil) Metropolitano	22 July 2022	30 June 2023 (Note: Ruan was already on loan since 2019 and his contract would end on 30 June 2022. However, the club had to renew his contract due to an injury.)	First team	

=== Transfers out ===
#	Position	Player	Transferred to	Fee	Date	Team	Source
	GK	(Brazil) Filipe	Free agent	End of contract	13 December 2021	Under-23s	
	DF	(Brazil) Michel Macedo	(Brazil) Ceará	Free transfer (End of contract)	22 December 2021	First team	
	MF	(Ecuador) Junior Sornoza	(Ecuador) Independiente del Valle	Free transfer (Rescinded contract)	28 December 2021	First team	
	MF	(Brazil) Richard	(Brazil) Ceará	Free transfer (Rescinded contract)	29 December 2021	First team	
	GK	(Brazil) Walter	(Brazil) Cuiabá	Free transfer (End of contract)	30 December 2021	First team	
	FW	(Brazil) André Luis	(Brazil) Cuiabá	Free transfer (Rescinded contract)	30 December 2021	First team	
20	MF	(Brazil) Marquinhos	(Brazil) Cuiabá	Free transfer (Rescinded contract)	30 December 2021	First team	
1	GK	(Brazil) Caíque França	(Brazil) Ponte Preta	Free transfer (End of contract)	1 January 2022	First team	
	FW	(Brazil) Hugo Borges	(Greece) Kalamata	Free transfer (End of contract)	1 January 2022	Under-23s	
	DF	(Brazil) Higor Lapa	Free agent	End of contract	1 January 2022	Under-23s	
17	FW	(Brazil) Cauê	(Belgium) Lommel S.K.	Loan cancelled (Note: Cauê was loaned from Novorizontino, but the loan was cancelled as the player was sold from Novorizontino to Lommel S.K.)	11 January 2022	First team	
	MF	(Brazil) Éderson	(Italy) Salernitana	€6,500,000 (~R$39,000,000)	30 January 2022	First team	
	FW	(Brazil) Rafael Bilú	(Brazil) Criciúma	Free transfer (Rescinded contract)	3 February 2022	Under-23s	
5	MF	(Brazil) Gabriel	(Brazil) Internacional	Free transfer (Rescinded contract)	10 February 2022	First team	
38	MF	(Brazil) Gabriel Pereira	(United States) New York City	U$5,500,000 (~R$27,600,000)	17 March 2022	First team	
	DF	(Brazil) Igor Formiga	(Brazil) Ponte Preta	Free transfer (Rescinded contract)	12 April 2022	First team	
77	FW	(Brazil) Jô	Free agent	Rescinded contract	9 June 2022	First team	
2	DF	(Brazil) João Pedro	(Portugal) Porto	End of loan	1 July 2022	First team	
33	DF	(Brazil) João Victor	(Portugal) Benfica	€9,500,000 (~R$51,500,000)	7 July 2022	First team	
	FW	(Brazil) Madson	(Portugal) Moreirense	Free transfer (Rescinded contract)	11 July 2022	First team	
40	GK	(Brazil) Guilherme Castellani	(Cyprus) Akritas Chlorakas	Free transfer (Rescinded contract)	13 July 2022	First team	
	MF	(Brazil) Vitinho	(Portugal) Arouca	Free transfer (Rescinded contract)	20 July 2022	First team	
	FW	(Brazil) John Kléber	Free agent	Rescinded contract	21 July 2022	Under-23s	
10	FW	(Brazil) Willian	(England) Fulham	Free transfer (Rescinded contract)	12 August 2022	First team	

=== Loans out ===
#	Position	Player	Loaned to	Date	Loan expires	Team	Source
	DF	(Brazil) Igor Morais	(Brazil) Rio Branco	29 November 2021	3 April 2022	Under-23s	
	MF	(Brazil) Matheus Jesus	(Brazil) Ponte Preta	22 December 2021	31 December 2022	First team	
	FW	(Brazil) Matheus Davó	(Brazil) São Bernardo	27 December 2021	3 April 2022	First team	
	FW	(Brazil) Janderson	(Brazil) Grêmio	28 December 2021	31 December 2022	First team	
	FW	(Brazil) John Kléber	(Brazil) Rio Branco	30 December 2021	3 April 2022	Under-23s	
	MF	(Brazil) Warian	(Brazil) Sampaio Corrêa	30 December 2021	31 December 2022	Under-23s	
	DF	(Brazil) Caetano	(Brazil) Goiás	31 December 2021	31 December 2022	First team	
13	DF	(Brazil) Léo Santos	(Brazil) Ponte Preta	3 January 2022	31 December 2022	First team	
	MF	(Brazil) Fessin	(Brazil) Ponte Preta	4 January 2022	31 December 2022	First team	
	DF	(Brazil) Igor Formiga	(Brazil) Ponte Preta	4 January 2022	3 April 2022	Under-23s	
43	MF	(Brazil) Vitinho	(Brazil) Vasco da Gama	4 January 2022	31 December 2022 (Cancelled on 13 July 2022)	First team	
	DF	(Brazil) Matheus Alexandre	(Brazil) Coritiba	5 January 2022	31 December 2022	First team	
	GK	(Brazil) Yago	(Brazil) São Joseense	6 January 2022	3 April 2022	Under-23s	
	FW	(Brazil) Everaldo	(Brazil) América Mineiro	7 January 2022	31 December 2022	First team	
	MF	(Brazil) Éderson	(Brazil) Fortaleza	9 January 2022	31 December 2022 (Cancelled on 28 January 2022)	First team	
	MF	(Brazil) Thiaguinho	(Brazil) Santo André	12 January 2022	3 April 2022	First team	
	FW	(Brazil) Matheus Matias	(Brazil) Ponte Preta	3 March 2022	31 December 2022	First team	
44	MF	(Brazil) Luis Mandaca	(Brazil) Londrina	30 March 2022	31 December 2022	First team	
	DF	(Brazil) Igor Morais	(Brazil) Remo	3 April 2022	31 December 2022	First team	
	GK	(Brazil) Yago	(Brazil) Penapolense	3 April 2022	31 December 2022	Academy	
	FW	(Brazil) Matheus Davó	(Brazil) Bahia	6 April 2022	31 December 2022	First team	
	FW	(Brazil) Jonathan Cafú	(Brazil) Cuiabá	7 April 2022	31 December 2022	First team	
	FW	(Brazil) Rodrigo Varanda	(Brazil) Chapecoense	7 April 2022	31 December 2022 (Cancelled on 5 July 2022)	First team	
	FW	(Brazil) Eduardo Tanque	(Brazil) Coritiba	8 April 2022	30 November 2022	Academy	
	DF	(Brazil) Daniel Marcos	(Brazil) Cianorte	10 April 2022	31 December 2022	Academy	
25	DF	(Brazil) Reginaldo	(Brazil) Tombense	11 April 2022	31 December 2022	First team	
	MF	(Brazil) Thiaguinho	(Brazil) Botafogo (SP)	11 April 2022	31 December 2022	First team	
35	DF	(Brazil) Danilo Avelar	(Brazil) América Mineiro	12 April 2022	31 December 2022	First team	
31	FW	(Brazil) Gustavo Mantuan	(Russia) Zenit Saint Petersburg	29 June 2022 (Note: Deal was effective on 14 July.)	30 June 2023	First team	
1	GK	(Brazil) Ivan	(Russia) Zenit Saint Petersburg	29 June 2022	30 June 2023	First team	
	FW	(Brazil) Rodrigo Varanda	(Cyprus) Akritas Chlorakas	12 July 2022	30 June 2023	First team	
	FW	(Brazil) Nathan	(Brazil) Avaí	15 July 2022	31 December 2022	First team	
	FW	(Brazil) Luan	(Brazil) Santos	5 August 2022	31 December 2022	First team	
38	FW	(Brazil) Léo Natel	(Portugal) Casa Pia	2 September 2022	30 June 2023	First team	

== Squad statistics ==
No.	Pos.	Name	Campeonato Paulista		Copa Libertadores		Campeonato Brasileiro		Copa do Brasil		Total		Discipline	
No.	Pos.	Name	Apps	Goals	Apps	Goals	Apps	Goals	Apps	Goals	Apps	Goals	Yellow card	Red card
2	DF	(Portugal) Rafael Ramos	0	0	1	0	15 (5)	0	1 (2)	0	17 (7)	0	3	0
3	DF	(Brazil) Robson Bambu	1 (1)	0	2	0	4 (3)	0	1	0	8 (4)	0	1	0
4	DF	(Brazil) Gil	12	1	3 (3)	0	23 (2)	0	8	1	46 (5)	2	8	0
5	MF	(Brazil) Maycon	0	0	6 (1)	2	10 (6)	0	2 (1)	0	18 (8)	2	4	0
6	DF	(Brazil) Lucas Piton	9	0	5 (3)	0	20 (8)	1	5 (2)	0	39 (13)	1	5	0
8	MF	(Brazil) Renato Augusto	11 (2)	2	3 (4)	0	16 (9)	1	5	2	35 (15)	5	2	0
9	FW	(Brazil) Yuri Alberto	0	0	2	0	15 (5)	8	6	3	23 (5)	11	6	1
10	FW	(Brazil) Róger Guedes	13 (1)	4	2 (6)	0	33 (3)	10	8	1	56 (10)	15	9	0
11	MF	(Brazil) Giuliano	9 (5)	1	4 (4)	0	18 (14)	1	4 (5)	5	35 (28)	7	2	0
12	GK	(Brazil) Cássio	12	0	9	0	34	0	9	0	64	0	4	0
13	DF	(Brazil) Lucas Belezi	0	0	0	0	0	0	0	0	0	0	0	0
14	MF	(Brazil) Guilherme Biro	0	0	0	0	1 (1)	0	0	0	1 (1)	0	1	0
15	MF	(Brazil) Paulinho	9 (5)	3	2 (1)	0	3	1	0	0	14 (6)	4	2	0
16	DF	(Brazil) Léo Mana	0	0	0	0	1	0	0	0	1	0	0	0
17	MF	(Brazil) Ramiro	0	0	0	0	6 (6)	0	0 (2)	0	6 (8)	0	3	0
18	FW	(Ukraine) Júnior Moraes	0 (2)	0	1 (3)	0	5 (4)	0	1 (1)	1	7 (10)	1	3	0
19	FW	(Brazil) Gustavo Silva	7 (6)	2	4 (3)	0	13 (9)	3	3 (5)	0	27 (23)	5	2	0
20	MF	(Brazil) Matheus Araújo	0	0	0	0	0	0	0 (1)	0	0 (1)	0	0	0
21	MF	(Brazil) Mateus Vital	0	0	0	0	7 (9)	0	0 (4)	0	7 (13)	0	1	0
22	GK	(Brazil) Carlos Miguel	0	0	0	0	2	0	0	0	2	0	0	0
23	DF	(Brazil) Fagner	12	0	6	0	9 (8)	0	8	0	35 (8)	0	9	0
24	MF	(Colombia) Víctor Cantillo	3 (4)	0	2 (2)	0	10 (9)	0	2 (2)	0	17 (17)	0	5	1
25	DF	(Uruguay) Bruno Méndez	0	0	2 (2)	0	13 (5)	0	0	0	15 (7)	0	1	2
26	DF	(Brazil) Fábio Santos	4 (1)	2	7 (1)	0	17 (5)	3	6	0	34 (7)	5	8	0
27	DF	(Brazil) Bruno Melo	1 (1)	0	0 (2)	0	5 (2)	0	2	0	8 (5)	0	2	0
28	MF	(Brazil) Adson	2 (6)	1	6	1	13 (12)	3	6 (4)	0	27 (22)	5	2	1
29	MF	(Brazil) Roni	2 (2)	0	3 (2)	0	6 (13)	0	3 (1)	0	14 (18)	0	6	1
30	DF	(Brazil) Robert Renan	0	0	0	0	10	0	1 (2)	0	11 (2)	0	2	0
31	DF	(Paraguay) Fabián Balbuena	0	0	1 (1)	0	13	3	5 (1)	0	19 (2)	3	2	0
32	GK	(Brazil) Matheus Donelli	2	0	0	0	2 (1)	0	0	0	4 (1)	0	0	0
33	MF	(Argentina) Fausto Vera	0	0	1 (1)	0	16 (2)	0	5 (1)	0	22 (4)	0	6	0
34	DF	(Brazil) Raul Gustavo	3	1	7	0	18 (2)	2	4	1	32 (2)	4	11	0
37	MF	(Brazil) Du Queiroz	11 (1)	0	7 (2)	1	28 (8)	2	8 (1)	0	54 (12)	3	8	0
38	FW	(Brazil) Arthur Sousa	0	0	0	0	0 (1)	0	0	0	0 (1)	0	0	0
39	MF	(Brazil) Xavier	0 (1)	0	0	0	2 (3)	0	1 (4)	0	3 (8)	0	3	0
41	FW	(Brazil) Felipe Augusto	0	0	0	0	1 (2)	0	0 (1)	0	1 (3)	0	0	0
42	FW	(Brazil) Giovane	0	0	0 (2)	0	2 (8)	0	0 (4)	0	2 (14)	0	3	0
47	FW	(Brazil) Wesley	0	0	0	0	0 (2)	0	0 (2)	0	0 (4)	0	0	0
–	MF	(Brazil) Ruan	0	0	0	0	0	0	0	0	0	0	0	0
Players transferred out during the season
1	GK	(Brazil) Ivan	0	0	1	0	0	0	1 (1)	0	2 (1)	0	0	0
2	DF	(Brazil) João Pedro	2 (1)	0	1 (1)	0	1 (1)	0	0	0	4 (3)	0	2	0
5	MF	(Brazil) Gabriel	0 (1)	0	0	0	0	0	0	0	0 (1)	0	0	0
7	FW	(Brazil) Luan	1 (2)	0	0	0	0	0	0	0	1 (2)	0	0	0
10	FW	(Brazil) Willian	8 (4)	1	6 (2)	0	10 (4)	0	2	0	26 (10)	1	2	0
31	FW	(Brazil) Gustavo Mantuan	5 (4)	1	5 (2)	0	10 (4)	3	1 (2)	1	21 (12)	5	1	0
33	DF	(Brazil) João Victor	12 (1)	0	6	0	5 (2)	0	2	0	25 (3)	0	7	0
38	MF	(Brazil) Gabriel Pereira	2 (3)	0	0	0	0	0	0	0	2 (3)	0	0	0
38	FW	(Brazil) Léo Natel	0	0	0	0	0 (1)	0	0	0	0 (1)	0	0	0
40	GK	(Brazil) Guilherme Castellani	0	0	0	0	0	0	0	0	0	0	0	0
77	FW	(Brazil) Jô	1 (7)	2	5 (1)	0	1 (3)	1	1	1	8 (11)	4	2	0

== Overview ==
Competition	First match	Last match	Starting round	Final position	Record							
Competition	First match	Last match	Starting round	Final position	Pld	W	D	L	GF	GA	GD	Win %
Série A	10 April 2022	13 November 2022	Matchday 1	Fourth place	38	18	11	9	44	36	+8	47.37
Copa do Brasil	20 April 2022	19 October 2022	Third round	Runners-up	10	4	4	2	17	8	+9	40.00
Campeonato Paulista	25 January 2022	27 March 2022	Matchday 1	Semi-finals	14	7	3	4	21	12	+9	50.00
Copa Libertadores	5 April 2022	9 August 2022	Group stage	Quarter-finals	10	2	5	3	5	7	−2	20.00
Total					72	31	23	18	87	63	+24	43.06

Source: Competitions

== Campeonato Paulista ==
For the 2022 Campeonato Paulista, the 16 teams are divided in four groups of 4 teams (A, B, C, D). They faced all teams, except those that were in their own group, with the top two teams from each group qualifying for the quarterfinals. The two overall worst teams were relegated.

=== First stage ===
Group A
Pos	Team	Pld	W	D	L	GF	GA	GD	Pts	Qualification or relegation
1	Corinthians	12	7	2	3	19	9	+10	23	Knockout stage
2	Guarani	12	4	2	6	12	17	−5	14	Knockout stage
3	Internacional de Limeira	12	3	5	4	14	16	−2	14	
4	Água Santa	12	3	2	7	11	15	−4	11	

Source: Soccerway

25 January 2022 1	Corinthians	0–0	Ferroviária	São Paulo
21:00 UTC−3		Report		Stadium: Neo Química Arena; Attendance: 24,039; Referee: Thiago Luis Scarascati
Note: It was played with a 70% stadium capacity due to the COVID-19 pandemic in Brazil.

30 January 2022 2	Santo André	0–1	Corinthians	Santo André
18:30 UTC−3		Report	Fábio Santos 29' (pen.)	Stadium: Estádio Bruno José Daniel; Attendance: Undisclosed; Referee: Matheus Delgado Candançan
Note: It was played with a 70% stadium capacity due to the COVID-19 pandemic in Brazil.

2 February 2022 3	Corinthians	1–2	Santos	São Paulo
21:35 UTC−3	Jô 52'	Report	Marcos Leonardo 65', 70' (pen.)	Stadium: Neo Química Arena; Attendance: 28,091; Referee: Thiago Luis Scarascati
Note: It was played with a 70% stadium capacity due to the COVID-19 pandemic in Brazil.

6 February 2022 4	Ituano	2–3	Corinthians	Itu
18:30 UTC−3	Neto Berola 6'; Cleberson 42'	Report	Fábio Santos 31' (pen.); Giuliano 46'; Paulinho 72'	Stadium: Estádio Novelli Júnior; Attendance: 10,034; Referee: Luiz Flávio de Oliveira
Note: It was played with a 70% stadium capacity due to the COVID-19 pandemic in Brazil.

10 February 2022 5	Corinthians	2–1	Mirassol	São Paulo
21:30 UTC−3	Renato Augusto 19'; Paulinho 30'	Report	Rodrigo Ferreira 24'	Stadium: Neo Química Arena; Attendance: 22,326; Referee: Raphael Claus
Note: It was played with a 70% stadium capacity due to the COVID-19 pandemic in Brazil.

16 February 2022 7	Corinthians	3–0	São Bernardo	São Paulo
21:30 UTC−3	Róger Guedes 54', 68'; Willian 72' (pen.)	Report		Stadium: Neo Química Arena; Attendance: 21,145; Referee: Thiago Lourenço de Mattos
Note: It was played with a 70% stadium capacity due to the COVID-19 pandemic in Brazil.

19 February 2022 8	Botafogo	1–1	Corinthians	Ribeirão Preto
18:30 UTC−3	Hélio Paraíba 68'	Report	Raul Gustavo 40'	Stadium: Estádio Santa Cruz; Attendance: 13,936; Referee: Douglas Marques das Flores
Note: It was played with a 70% stadium capacity due to the COVID-19 pandemic in Brazil.

27 February 2022 9	Corinthians	1–0	Red Bull Bragantino	São Paulo
11:00 UTC−3	Gustavo Silva 80'	Report		Stadium: Neo Química Arena; Attendance: 30,423; Referee: Thiago Luis Scarascati
Note: The match was originally scheduled for 26 February, but it was postponed due to broadcast requests. It was played with a 70% stadium capacity due to the COVID-19 pandemic in Brazil.

5 March 2022 10	São Paulo	1–0	Corinthians	São Paulo
16:00 UTC−3	Calleri 1'	Report		Stadium: Morumbi; Attendance: 39,213; Referee: Flávio Rodrigues de Souza
Note: It was played with a 70% stadium capacity due to the COVID-19 pandemic in Brazil.

12 March 2022 11	Corinthians	5–0	Ponte Preta	São Paulo
18:30 UTC−3	Renato Augusto 15'; Paulinho 45'; Gustavo Silva 45+3'; Adson 61'; Mantuan 90+5'	Report		Stadium: Neo Química Arena; Attendance: 39,488; Referee: Luiz Flávio de Oliveira

17 March 2022 6	Palmeiras	2–1	Corinthians	São Paulo
20:30 UTC−3	Raphael Veiga 29' (pen.); Danilo 69'	Report	Róger Guedes 61' (pen.)	Stadium: Allianz Parque; Attendance: 39,511; Referee: Matheus Candançan
Note: The match was originally scheduled for 13 February, but it was postponed due to the participation of Palmeiras in the 2021 FIFA Club World Cup.

20 March 2022 12	Novorizontino	0–1	Corinthians	Novo Horizonte
16:00 UTC−3		Report	Róger Guedes 61'	Stadium: Estádio Doutor Jorge Ismael de Biasi; Attendance: 8,146; Referee: Thiago Lourenço de Mattos

=== Knockout stages ===
24 March 2022 Quarter-finals	Corinthians	1–1 (7–6 p)	Guarani	São Paulo
19:00 UTC−3	Gil 43'	Report	João Victor 54'	Stadium: Neo Química Arena; Attendance: 39,283; Referee: Flávio Rodrigues de Souza
	Penalties
	Fábio Santos (penalty scored); Giuliano (penalty scored); Renato Augusto (penalty scored); Júnior Moraes (penalty scored); João Victor (penalty scored); Fagner (penalty scored); Adson (penalty scored)		(penalty scored) Giovanni Augusto; (penalty scored) Kozlinski; (penalty scored) Lucas Venuto; (penalty scored) Lucão do Break; (penalty scored) Bruno Silva; (penalty scored) Ronald; (penalty missed) Madison

27 March 2022 Semi-finals	São Paulo	2–1	Corinthians	São Paulo
16:00 UTC−3	Welington 42'; Alisson 63'	Report	Jô 86'	Stadium: Estádio do Morumbi; Attendance: 53,924; Referee: Vinícius Gonçalves Dias Araújo

== Copa Libertadores ==
=== Group stage ===
Pos	Team	Pld	W	D	L	GF	GA	GD	Pts	Qualification	BOC	COR	CAL	CAR
1	(Argentina) Boca Juniors	6	3	1	2	5	5	0	10	Round of 16	—	1–1	1–0	2–0
2	(Brazil) Corinthians	6	2	3	1	5	4	+1	9	Round of 16	2–0	—	1–0	1–1
3	(Colombia) Deportivo Cali	6	2	2	2	7	4	+3	8	Copa Sudamericana	2–0	0–0	—	3–0
4	(Bolivia) Always Ready	6	1	2	3	5	9	−4	5		0–1	2–0	2–2	—

Source: CONMEBOL
Rules for classification: 1) Points; 2) Goal difference; 3) Goals scored; 4) Away goals scored; 5) CONMEBOL ranking.

5 April 2022 1	Always Ready (Bolivia)	2–0	(Brazil) Corinthians	La Paz, Bolivia
20:30 UTC−4	Riquelme 8' (pen.); Ramallo 46'	Report		Stadium: Estadio Hernando Siles (Note: Always Ready played their home match at Estadio Hernando Siles, La Paz instead of their regular stadium Estadio Municipal de Villa Ingenio, El Alto which did not meet CONMEBOL requirements.); Attendance: 4,536; Referee: Piero Maza (Chile)

13 April 2022 2	Corinthians (Brazil)	1–0	(Colombia) Deportivo Cali	São Paulo, Brazil
21:00 UTC−3	Caldera 68' (o.g.)	Report		Stadium: Neo Química Arena; Attendance: 37,837; Referee: Eber Aquino (Paraguay)

26 April 2022 3	Corinthians (Brazil)	2–0	(Argentina) Boca Juniors	São Paulo, Brazil
21:30 UTC−3	Maycon 5', 78'	Report		Stadium: Neo Química Arena; Attendance: 44,449; Referee: Andrés Matonte (Uruguay)

4 May 2022 4	Deportivo Cali (Colombia)	0–0	(Brazil) Corinthians	Palmira, Colombia
19:00 UTC−5		Report		Stadium: Estadio Deportivo Cali; Attendance: Undisclosed; Referee: Andrés Cunha (Uruguay)

17 May 2022 5	Boca Juniors (Argentina)	1–1	(Brazil) Corinthians	Buenos Aires, Argentina
21:30 UTC−3	Benedetto 42'	Report	Du Queiroz 16'	Stadium: Estadio Alberto J. Armando; Attendance: 46,238; Referee: Christian Ferreyra (Uruguay)

26 May 2022 6	Corinthians (Brazil)	1–1	(Bolivia) Always Ready	São Paulo, Brazil
21:00 UTC−3	Adson 19'	Report	Borja 44'	Stadium: Neo Química Arena; Attendance: 39,978; Referee: José Argote (Venezuela)

=== Knockout stages ===
28 June 2022 Round of 16	Corinthians (Brazil)	0–0	(Argentina) Boca Juniors	São Paulo, Brazil
21:30 UTC−3		Report		Stadium: Neo Química Arena; Attendance: 44,918; Referee: Roberto Tobar (Chile)

5 July 2022 Round of 16	Boca Juniors (Argentina)	0–0 (0–0 agg.) (5–6 p)	(Brazil) Corinthians	Buenos Aires, Argentina
21:30 UTC−3		Report		Stadium: Estadio Alberto J. Armando; Attendance: 49,600; Referee: Andrés Matonte (Uruguay)
	Penalties
	Rojo (penalty scored); Izquierdoz (penalty scored); Villa (penalty missed); Fernández (penalty scored); Benedetto (penalty missed); Romero (penalty scored); Varela (penalty scored); Ramírez (penalty missed)		(penalty scored) Fábio Santos; (penalty scored) Cantillo; (penalty missed) Raul Gustavo; (penalty missed) Bruno Melo; (penalty scored) Róger Guedes; (penalty scored) Roni; (penalty scored) Piton; (penalty scored) Gil

2 August 2022 Quarter-finals	Corinthians (Brazil)	0–2	(Brazil) Flamengo	São Paulo, Brazil
21:30 UTC−3		Report	De Arrascaeta 37'; Gabriel 51'	Stadium: Neo Química Arena; Attendance: 45,349; Referee: Patricio Loustau (Argentina)

9 August 2022 Quarter-finals	Flamengo (Brazil)	1–0 (3–0 agg.)	(Brazil) Corinthians	Rio de Janeiro, Brazil
21:30 UTC−3	Pedro 52'	Report		Stadium: Maracanã; Attendance: 68,418; Referee: Esteban Ostojich (Uruguay)

== Campeonato Brasileiro ==
Pos	Team	Pld	W	D	L	GF	GA	GD	Pts	Qualification or relegation
2	Internacional	38	20	13	5	58	31	+27	73	Qualification for Copa Libertadores group stage (Note: Flamengo qualified for the Copa Libertadores group stage by winning the 2022 Copa Libertadores. Since they also won the 2022 Copa do Brasil, the berth awarded to the Copa do Brasil champions (Copa Libertadores group stage) was passed over to the league's best placed team not already qualified.)
3	Fluminense	38	21	7	10	63	41	+22	70	Qualification for Copa Libertadores group stage
4	Corinthians	38	18	11	9	44	36	+8	65	Qualification for Copa Libertadores group stage
5	Flamengo	38	18	8	12	60	39	+21	62	Qualification for Copa Libertadores group stage
6	Athletico Paranaense	38	16	10	12	48	48	0	58	Qualification for Copa Libertadores group stage

Source: CBF
Rules for classification: 1) points; 2) wins; 3) goal difference; 4) goals scored; 5) head-to-head results (only between two teams); 6) fewest red cards; 7) fewest yellow cards; 8) drawing of lots.

=== Results ===
10 April 2022 1	Botafogo	1–3	Corinthians	Rio de Janeiro
16:00 UTC−3	Diego Gonçalves 66' (pen.)	Report	Paulinho 17'; Mantuan 26'; Piton 44'	Stadium: Estádio Olímpico Nilton Santos; Attendance: 36,898; Referee: Wilton Sampaio

16 April 2022 2	Corinthians	3–0	Avaí	São Paulo
19:00 UTC−3	Róger Guedes 9', 25', 55'	Report		Stadium: Neo Química Arena; Attendance: 30,497; Referee: Bruno Arleu de Araújo

23 April 2022 3	Palmeiras	3–0	Corinthians	Barueri
19:00 UTC−3	Gómez 14'; Rony 19'; Dudu 71'	Report		Stadium: Arena Barueri (Note: Palmeiras played their home match at Arena Barueri, Barueri instead of their regular stadium Allianz Parque, São Paulo due to the stadium hosting a concert.); Attendance: 23,973; Referee: Anderson Daronco

1 May 2022 4	Corinthians	1–0	Fortaleza	São Paulo
16:00 UTC−3	Matheus Jussa 53' (o.g.)	Report		Stadium: Neo Química Arena; Attendance: 37,018; Referee: Sávio Pereira Sampaio

8 May 2022 5	Red Bull Bragantino	0–1	Corinthians	Bragança Paulista
18:00 UTC−3		Report	Renato Augusto 54'	Stadium: Estádio Nabi Abi Chedid; Attendance: 9,993; Referee: Raphael Claus

14 May 2022 6	Internacional	2–2	Corinthians	Porto Alegre
19:00 UTC−3	Alan Patrick 25'; Wanderson 45'	Report	Raul Gustavo 30'; Jô 64'	Stadium: Estádio Beira-Rio; Attendance: 17,506; Referee: Bráulio da Silva Machado

22 May 2022 7	Corinthians	1–1	São Paulo	São Paulo
16:00 UTC−3	Adson 80'	Report	Calleri 45+6'	Stadium: Neo Química Arena; Attendance: 44,899; Referee: Wilton Sampaio

29 May 2022 8	Corinthians	1–1	América Mineiro	São Paulo
18:00 UTC−3	Gustavo Silva 82'	Report	Aloísio 67'	Stadium: Neo Química Arena; Attendance: 35,122; Referee: Anderson Daronco

4 June 2022 9	Atlético Goianiense	0–1	Corinthians	Goiânia
20:30 UTC−3		Report	Mantuan 33'	Stadium: Estádio Antônio Accioly; Attendance: 12,089; Referee: Bruno Arleu de Araújo

7 June 2022 10	Cuiabá	1–0	Corinthians	Cuiabá
21:30 UTC−3	Uendel 36'	Report		Stadium: Arena Pantanal; Attendance: 22,129; Referee: Marcelo de Lima Henrique
Note: The match was originally scheduled for 9 June, but it was anticipated due to broadcast requests.

11 June 2022 11	Corinthians	2–0	Juventude	São Paulo
16:30 UTC−3	Adson 2'; Mantuan 84'	Report		Stadium: Neo Química Arena; Attendance: 34,850; Referee: Ramon Abatti Abel

15 June 2022 12	Athletico Paranaense	1–1	Corinthians	Curitiba
21:30 UTC−3	Terans 82' (pen.)	Report	Róger Guedes 5'	Stadium: Arena da Baixada; Attendance: 26,182; Referee: Leandro Vuaden

19 June 2022 13	Corinthians	1–0	Goiás	São Paulo
16:00 UTC−3	Fábio Santos 34' (pen.)	Report		Stadium: Neo Química Arena; Attendance: 36,153; Referee: Bráulio da Silva Machado

25 June 2022 14	Corinthians	0–0	Santos	São Paulo
19:00 UTC−3		Report		Stadium: Neo Química Arena; Attendance: 41,124; Referee: Flávio Rodrigues de Souza

2 July 2022 15	Fluminense	4–0	Corinthians	Rio de Janeiro
16:30 UTC−3	Manoel 15'; Cano 42', 71'; Fred 90+1'	Report		Stadium: Maracanã; Attendance: 44,782; Referee: Wilton Sampaio

10 July 2022 16	Corinthians	1–0	Flamengo	São Paulo
16:00 UTC−3	Rodinei 52' (o.g.)	Report		Stadium: Neo Química Arena; Attendance: 44,055; Referee: Ramon Abatti Abel

16 July 2022 17	Ceará	3–1	Corinthians	Fortaleza
21:00 UTC−3	Bruno Pacheco 28'; Vina 33'; Cléber 76'	Report	Róger Guedes 4'	Stadium: Arena Castelão; Attendance: 28,683; Referee: Leandro Vuaden

20 July 2022 18	Corinthians	3–1	Coritiba	São Paulo
21:30 UTC−3	Róger Guedes 37'; Adson 67'; Raul Gustavo 85'	Report	Luciano Castán 54'	Stadium: Neo Química Arena; Attendance: 40,136; Referee: Wagner do Nascimento Magalhães

24 July 2022 19	Atlético Mineiro	1–2	Corinthians	Belo Horizonte
18:00 UTC−3	Keno 9'	Report	Fábio Santos 80', 86' (pen.)	Stadium: Mineirão; Attendance: 55,706; Referee: Ramon Abatti Abel

30 July 2022 20	Corinthians	1–0	Botafogo	São Paulo
19:00 UTC−3	Gustavo Silva 27'	Report		Stadium: Neo Química Arena; Attendance: 42,797; Referee: Jean Pierre Gonçalves Lima

6 August 2022 21	Avaí	1–1	Corinthians	Florianópolis
19:00 UTC−3	Bissoli 36' (pen.)	Report	Balbuena 77'	Stadium: Ressacada; Attendance: 12,648; Referee: Wilton Sampaio

13 August 2022 22	Corinthians	0–1	Palmeiras	São Paulo
19:00 UTC−3		Report	Roni 72' (o.g.)	Stadium: Neo Química Arena; Attendance: 44,966; Referee: Raphael Claus

21 August 2022 23	Fortaleza	1–0	Corinthians	Fortaleza
18:00 UTC−3	Moisés 65'	Report		Stadium: Arena Castelão; Attendance: 44,338; Referee: Leandro Vuaden
Note: The match was originally scheduled for 20 August, but it was rescheduled by CBF on 4 August due to the stadium receiving a music festival on the original date.

29 August 2022 24	Corinthians	1–0	Red Bull Bragantino	São Paulo
21:30 UTC−3	Gustavo Silva 31'	Report		Stadium: Neo Química Arena; Attendance: 36,484; Referee: Wilton Sampaio
Note: The match was originally scheduled for 27 August, but it was postponed by CBF due to schedule adjustments.

4 September 2022 25	Corinthians	2–2	Internacional	São Paulo
16:00 UTC−3	Balbuena 13'; Yuri Alberto 19'	Report	Alemão 1'; Alan Patrick 67'	Stadium: Neo Química Arena; Attendance: 41,748; Referee: Bráulio da Silva Machado

11 September 2022 26	São Paulo	1–1	Corinthians	São Paulo
16:00 UTC−3	Éder 33' (pen.)	Report	Yuri Alberto 14'	Stadium: Estádio do Morumbi; Attendance: 46,444; Referee: Marcelo de Lima Henrique

18 September 2022 27	América Mineiro	1–0	Corinthians	Belo Horizonte
18:00 UTC−3	Juninho 77'	Report		Stadium: Independência; Attendance: 6,416; Referee: Bruno Arleu de Araújo
Note: The match was originally scheduled for 17 September, but it was postponed by CBF due to Corinthians participation in the semi-finals of the 2022 Copa do Brasil.

28 September 2022 28	Corinthians	2–1	Atlético Goianiense	São Paulo
19:00 UTC−3	Róger Guedes 12'; Yuri Alberto 88'	Report	Wellington Rato 17'	Stadium: Neo Química Arena; Attendance: 32,398; Referee: Leandro Vuaden

1 October 2022 29	Corinthians	2–0	Cuiabá	São Paulo
21:00 UTC−3	Yuri Alberto 33'; Róger Guedes 45+4'	Report		Stadium: Neo Química Arena; Attendance: 37,681; Referee: Caio Max Augusto Vieira

4 October 2022 30	Juventude	2–2	Corinthians	Caxias do Sul
21:30 UTC−3	Ruiz 46'; Pitta 62'	Report	Giuliano 24'; Yuri Alberto 54'	Stadium: Estádio Alfredo Jaconi; Attendance: 3,159; Referee: Wagner do Nascimento Magalhães

8 October 2022 31	Corinthians	2–1	Athletico Paranaense	São Paulo
21:00 UTC−3	Balbuena 6'; Róger Guedes 22' (pen.)	Report	Erick 80'	Stadium: Neo Química Arena; Attendance: 38,649; Referee: Anderson Daronco

22 October 2022 33	Santos	0–1	Corinthians	Santos
19:00 UTC−3		Report	Róger Guedes 89'	Stadium: Vila Belmiro; Attendance: 12,872; Referee: Flávio Rodrigues de Souza

26 October 2022 34	Corinthians	0–2	Fluminense	São Paulo
21:45 UTC−3		Report	Cano 12', 70'	Stadium: Neo Química Arena; Attendance: 37,920; Referee: Leandro Vuaden

29 October 2022 32	Goiás	0–0	Corinthians	Goiânia
19:30 UTC−3		Report		Stadium: Estádio da Serrinha; Attendance: Undisclosed; Referee: Paulo Cesar Zanovelli da Silva (Note: Bruno Arleu de Araújo was the referee scheduled for the original date.)
Note: The match was originally scheduled for 16 October, but it was anticipated in one day due to schedule adjustments. The Common Justice had originally prohibited Corinthians' fans from attending the match due to safety concerns, a decision that was overruled by Supremo Tribunal de Justiça Desportiva (STJD) at first. In turn, Goiás decided to follow the former decision, which resulted in STJD suspending the match just a few hours before kickoff. It was later rescheduled for 29 October.

2 November 2022 35	Flamengo	1–2	Corinthians	Rio de Janeiro
21:30 UTC−3	Matheus França 48'	Report	Du Queiroz 43'; Yuri Alberto 75'	Stadium: Maracanã; Attendance: 60,369; Referee: Ramon Abatti Abel

5 November 2022 36	Corinthians	1–0	Ceará	São Paulo
20:30 UTC−3	Yuri Alberto 90'	Report		Stadium: Neo Química Arena; Attendance: 41,335; Referee: Bruno Arleu de Araújo

9 November 2022 37	Coritiba	2–2	Corinthians	Curitiba
19:00 UTC−3	Alef Manga 10', 37' (pen.)	Report	Du Queiroz 30'; Yuri Alberto 48'	Stadium: Estádio Couto Pereira; Attendance: 30,049; Referee: Marcelo de Lima Henrique

13 November 2022 38	Corinthians	0–1	Atlético Mineiro	São Paulo
16:00 UTC−3		Report	Vargas 45' (pen.)	Stadium: Neo Química Arena; Attendance: 43,696; Referee: Bráulio da Silva Machado

== Copa do Brasil ==
=== Preliminary stages ===
20 April 2022 Third round	Portuguesa (RJ)	1–1	Corinthians	Londrina (Paraná)
21:30 UTC−3	Cafu 2'	Report	Jô 45'	Stadium: Estádio do Café (Note: Portuguesa played their home match at Estádio do Café, Londrina, Paraná instead of their regular stadium Estádio Luso Brasileiro, Rio de Janeiro, Rio de Janeiro which did not meet the tournament requirements.); Attendance: 17,195; Referee: Paulo Roberto Alves Júnior

11 May 2022 Third round	Corinthians	2–0 (3–1 agg.)	Portuguesa (RJ)	São Paulo
21:30 UTC−3	Júnior Moraes 8'; Giuliano 32'	Report		Stadium: Neo Química Arena; Attendance: 35,316; Referee: Ramon Abatti Abel

=== Knockout stages ===
22 June 2022 Round of 16	Corinthians	4–0	Santos	São Paulo
21:30 UTC−3	Mantuan 20'; Giuliano 28', 77'; Raul Gustavo 43'	Report		Stadium: Neo Química Arena; Attendance: 40,624; Referee: Marcelo de Lima Henrique

13 July 2022 Round of 16	Santos	1–0 (1–4 agg.)	Corinthians	Santos
21:30 UTC−3	Marcos Leonardo 67' (pen.)	Report		Stadium: Vila Belmiro; Attendance: 12,294; Referee: Jean Pierre Gonçalves Lima

27 July 2022 Quarter-finals	Atlético Goianiense	2–0	Corinthians	Goiânia
21:30 UTC−3	Jorginho 23'; Léo Pereira 87'	Report		Stadium: Estádio Antônio Accioly (Note: Atlético Goianiense was expected to play their home match at Estádio Serra Dourada, Goiânia but opted to play at their regular stadium Estádio Antônio Accioly, Goiânia instead.); Attendance: 12,089; Referee: Marcelo de Lima Henrique

17 August 2022 Quarter-finals	Corinthians	4–1 (4–3 agg.)	Atlético Goianiense	São Paulo
21:30 UTC−3	Gil 42'; Yuri Alberto 50', 56', 72'	Report	Wellington Rato 87'	Stadium: Neo Química Arena; Attendance: 43,195; Referee: Bruno Arleu de Araújo

24 August 2022 Semi-finals	Fluminense	2–2	Corinthians	Rio de Janeiro
19:30 UTC−3	Ganso 4' (pen.); Arias 46'	Report	Renato Augusto 23'; Róger Guedes 90'	Stadium: Maracanã; Attendance: 58,203; Referee: Ramon Abatti Abel

15 September 2022 Semi-finals	Corinthians	3–0 (5–2 agg.)	Fluminense	São Paulo
20:00 UTC−3	Renato Augusto 34'; Giuliano 90+1'; Felipe Melo 90+4' (o.g.)	Report		Stadium: Neo Química Arena; Attendance: 45,998; Referee: Anderson Daronco

12 October 2022 Finals	Corinthians	0–0	Flamengo	São Paulo
21:45 UTC−3		Report		Stadium: Neo Química Arena; Attendance: 47,031; Referee: Bráulio da Silva Machado

19 October 2022 Finals	Flamengo	1–1 (1–1 agg.) (6–5 p)	Corinthians	Rio de Janeiro
21:45 UTC−3	Pedro 7'	Report	Giuliano 82'	Stadium: Maracanã; Attendance: 68,097; Referee: Wilton Sampaio
	Penalties
	Filipe Luís (penalty missed); David Luiz (penalty scored); Léo Pereira (penalty scored); Éverton Ribeiro (penalty scored); Gabriel Barbosa (penalty scored); Everton (penalty scored); Rodinei (penalty scored)		(penalty scored) Fábio Santos; (penalty scored) Giuliano; (penalty scored) Renato Augusto; (penalty missed) Fagner; (penalty scored) Yuri Alberto; (penalty scored) Maycon; (penalty missed) Mateus Vital

== See also ==
- List of Sport Club Corinthians Paulista seasons
