= Ruan Oliveira =

Brazilian footballer

Personal information
- Full name: Ruan de Oliveira Ferreira
- Date of birth: 23 March 2000 (age 26)
- Place of birth: Paraíso do Norte, Brazil
- Height: 1.76 m (5 ft 9 in)
- Position: Attacking midfielder

Team information
- Current team: Zorya Luhansk
- Number: 36

Youth career
- Metropolitano
- 2019–2020: → Corinthians (loan)

Senior career*
Years	Team	Apps	(Gls)
2019–	Metropolitano	19	(2)
2020–2024	→ Corinthians (loan)	32	(2)
2025	→ Cuiabá (loan)	14	(2)
2025–	Zorya Luhansk	9	(0)
- * Club domestic league appearances and goals as of 20 December 2025

Ruan de Oliveira Ferreira (born 23 March 2000), known as Ruan Oliveira or simply Ruan, is a Brazilian professional footballer who plays as an attacking midfielder for Zorya Luhansk, on loan from Metropolitano.

== Career ==
Ruan Oliveira made his professional debut for Metropolitano during the 2018 Campeonato Catarinense Série B, before signing with Corinthians' youth squad after the 2019 Campeonato Catarinense.

He made his senior debut for Sport Club Corinthians Paulista in a 2020 Campeonato Brasileiro Série A away match against Atlético Mineiro on 13 August 2020. He played in four matches, before suffering a season ending knee injury on 1 September. Ruan suffered an additional knee injury as he resumed training with Corinthians, and extended his contract until June 2023 while he recovered.

Ruan returned to action on 10 June 2023, after being nearly three years sidelined; replacing Guilherme Biro, he scored the equalizer in a 1–1 home draw against Cuiabá. He would feature regularly under head coach Vanderlei Luxemburgo, but lost space under Mano Menezes.

On 7 December 2023, Ruan suffered another knee injury, with his contract with Corinthians having to be renewed until his recovery.

== Career statistics ==
As of 2 January 2024.

Club	Season	League			State League		Cup		Continental		Other		Total	
Club	Season	Division	Apps	Goals	Apps	Goals	Apps	Goals	Apps	Goals	Apps	Goals	Apps	Goals
Metropolitano	2018	Catarinense Série B	—		5	1	—		—		—		5	1
Metropolitano	2019	Catarinense	—		14	1	—		—		—		14	1
Metropolitano	Total		—		19	2	—		—		—		19	2
Corinthians	2020	Série A	4	0	0	0	0	0	—		—		4	0
Corinthians	2021	Série A	0	0	0	0	0	0	0	0	—		0	0
Corinthians	2022	Série A	0	0	0	0	0	0	—		—		0	0
Corinthians	2023	Série A	19	2	—		4	0	5 (Note: Appearance(s) in Copa Sudamericana)	0	—		28	2
Corinthians	Total		23	2	0	0	4	0	5	0	—		32	2
Career total			23	2	19	2	4	0	5	0	0	0	51	4

== Honours ==
Metropolitano

- Campeonato Catarinense Série B: 2018
