= Giovane (footballer, born 2003) =

Brazilian footballer

Personal information
- Full name: Giovane Santana do Nascimento
- Date of birth: 24 November 2003 (age 22)
- Place of birth: Santa Bárbara d'Oeste, Brazil
- Height: 1.84 m (6 ft 0 in)
- Positions: Striker; right winger

Team information
- Current team: Napoli
- Number: 23

Youth career
- Red Bull Brasil
- 2021–2022: Capivariano
- 2021–2022: → Corinthians (loan)

Senior career*
Years	Team	Apps	(Gls)
2021–2022	Capivariano	8	(1)
2021–2022	→ Corinthians (loan)	10	(0)
2022–2025	Corinthians	19	(2)
2025–2026	Hellas Verona	21	(3)
2026–	Napoli	12	(0)

International career
2023–2024	Brazil U20	10	(1)
Medal record
Men's football
Representing Brazil
South American U-20 Championship
Winner	2023 Colombia
- * Club domestic league appearances and goals as of 23:51, 11 May 2026 (UTC)

Giovane Santana do Nascimento (born 24 November 2003), simply known as Giovane, is a Brazilian professional footballer who plays as a striker or right winger for Serie A club Napoli.

== Club career ==
Born in Santa Bárbara d'Oeste, São Paulo, Giovane began his career with Red Bull Brasil, but left the club for personal reasons, and only returned to football ahead of the 2021 season with Capivariano. He made his senior debut at the age of just 17 on 29 April 2021, coming on as a second-half substitute in a 0–1 Campeonato Paulista Série A3 away loss against Linense.

Giovane scored his first senior goal on 10 May 2021, netting the winner in a 3–2 home success over Penapolense. After eight first team appearances, he moved to Corinthians on loan on 16 July, being initially assigned to the under-20 squad.

Giovane impressed with the under-20s of Timão, and made his first team – and Campeonato Brasileiro Série A – debut on 10 April 2022, replacing Róger Guedes in a 3–1 away win over Botafogo.

On 28 July 2022, Giovane signed a permanent contract with Corinthians until 2025, as the club paid R$ 3 million for 65% of his economic rights. Giovane's professional debut for Corinthians took place on 10 April 2022, in the game against Botafogo for the Brazilian Championship, which Corinthians won 3-1. Giovane's first goal for Corinthians was scored in a match against Vasco da Gama on 28 November 2023, in the Brazilian Championship. The match was held at São Januário and Corinthians won 4–2.

Giovane left Alvinegro where in total, he played 47 games, with three goals, one assist and the Paulistão 2025 title.

On 8 July 2025, Giovane was announced as a new player of Serie A club Hellas Verona. On 24 January 2026, he joined fellow Italian club Napoli on a permanent transfer.

== Career statistics ==
As of match played 11 May 2026

Appearances and goals by club, season and competition
Club	Season	League			State league (Note: Includes Campeonato Paulista Série A3, Campeonato Paulista)		National cup (Note: Includes Copa do Brasil, Coppa Italia)		Continental		Total	
Club	Season	Division	Apps	Goals	Apps	Goals	Apps	Goals	Apps	Goals	Apps	Goals
Capivariano	2021	—			8	1	—		—		8	1
Corinthians (loan)	2022	Série A	10	0	0	0	4	0	2 (Note: Appearances in Copa Libertadores)	0	16	0
Corinthians	2023	Série A	5	1	1	0	0	0	2 (Note: One appearance in Copa Libertadores, one appearance in Copa Sudamericana)	0	8	1
Corinthians	2024	Série A	11	1	1	0	6	0	3 (Note: Appearance(s) in Copa Sudamericana)	1	21	2
Corinthians	2025	Série A	0	0	1	0	0	0	1	0	2	0
Corinthians	Corinthians total		26	2	3	0	10	0	8	1	47	3
Hellas Verona	2025–26	Serie A	21	3	—		2	0	—		23	3
Napoli	2025–26	Serie A	12	0	—		1	0	—		13	0
Career total			59	5	11	1	13	0	8	1	91	7

== Honours ==
Brazil U20

- South American U-20 Championship: 2023

Corinthians

- Campeonato Paulista: 2025
