= Matheus Donelli =

Brazilian footballer (born 2002)

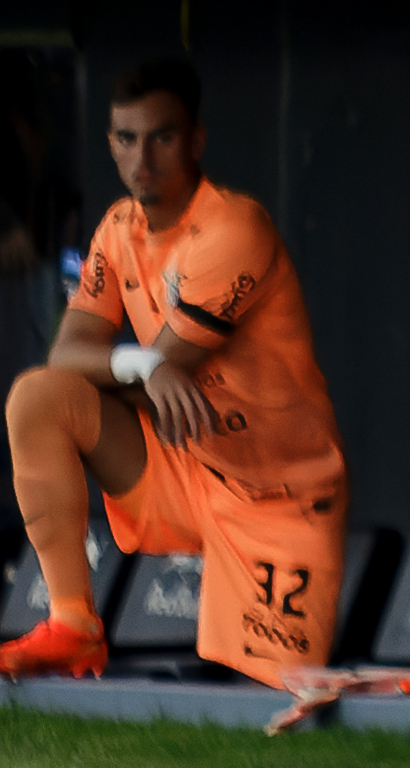
- Donelli with Corinthians in 2023

Personal information
- Full name: Matheus Planelles Donelli
- Date of birth: 17 May 2002 (age 24)
- Place of birth: São Paulo, Brazil
- Height: 1.87 m (6 ft 2 in)
- Position: Goalkeeper

Team information
- Current team: Shabab Al Ahli (on loan from Corinthians)

Youth career
- 2010–2020: Corinthians

Senior career*
Years	Team	Apps	(Gls)
2020–	Corinthians	16	(0)
2026–	→ Shabab Al Ahli (loan)	0	(0)

International career^{‡}
2019	Brazil U17	7	(0)
2023	Brazil U23	1	(0)
Medal record
Men's football
Representing Brazil
FIFA U17 World Cup
Winner	2019
Pan American Games
Winner	2023 Santiago
- * Club domestic league appearances and goals as of 23:10, 23 March 2023 (UTC) ‡ National team caps and goals as of 4 November 2023

Matheus Planelles Donelli (born 17 May 2002) is a Brazilian professional footballer who plays as a goalkeeper for Shabab Al Ahli, on loan from Corinthians.

== Early life ==
Matheus Donelli was born in São Paulo. He started his career in the youth categories of Corinthians in 2010, playing futsal. He later transitioned to football and joined the under-15 and under-17 teams. After the 2019 season, he was included in the squad for the following year's Copa São Paulo de Futebol Júnior, where he reached the semifinals.

== Club career ==
In July 2020, with the return of training after the COVID-19 pandemic, he was promoted to the professional squad by Tiago Nunes. Soon after, his contract was renewed until the end of 2024.

He made his debut for Corinthians on 3 March 2021, in a 2–2 draw against Palmeiras, at the Neo Química Arena, in the 2021 Campeonato Paulista.

== International career ==
=== Under-17 ===
In 2019, he was champion of the 2019 FIFA U-17 World Cup, where he also won the Golden Glove as the best goalkeeper of the tournament.

=== Under-23 ===
On 22 September 2023, he was called up to the Brazilian Under-23 team to compete in the 2023 Pan American Games in Santiago, Chile. On 4 November, he won the gold medal after the Brazilian team defeated Chile on penalties 4–2. On 21 December, he was called up to compete in the 2024 CONMEBOL Pre-Olympic Tournament.

== Honours ==
Brazil U17

- FIFA U-17 World Cup: 2019

Brazil U23

- Pan American Games: 2023

Corinthians

- Campeonato Paulista: 2025
- Copa do Brasil: 2025
- Supercopa do Brasil: 2026

=== Individual ===
- FIFA U-17 World Cup Golden Glove: 2019

== Career statistics ==
=== Club ===
As of 19 April 2025

Appearances and goals by club, season and competition
Club	Season	League			State League		Cup		Continental		Other		Total	
Club	Season	Division	Apps	Goals	Apps	Goals	Apps	Goals	Apps	Goals	Apps	Goals	Apps	Goals
Corinthians	2021	Série A	1	0	3 (Note: Appearances in the Campeonato Paulista)	0	—		1 (Note: Appearance(s) in Copa Sudamericana)	0	—		5	0
Corinthians	2022	Série A	3	0	2	0	—		—		—		5	0
Corinthians	2023	Série A	—		—		—		—		—		0	0
Corinthians	2024	Série A	7	0	—		—		—		—		7	0
Corinthians	2025	Série A	5	0	4	0	—		2	0	—		11	0
Career total			16	0	9	0	—		3	0	—		28	0
