= Thiago Larghi =

Brazilian football manager (born 1980)

Personal information
- Full name: Thiago Mendes Larghi
- Date of birth: 27 September 1980 (age 46)
- Place of birth: Paraíba do Sul, Brazil

Managerial career
- Years: Team
- 2016: Sport (assistant)
- 2016: Corinthians (assistant)
- 2017–2018: Atlético Mineiro (assistant)
- 2018: Atlético Mineiro (interim)
- 2018: Atlético Mineiro
- 2020: Goiás
- 2023: Corinthians (assistant)

Thiago Mendes Larghi (born 27 September 1980) is a Brazilian football manager.

== Career ==
Born in Paraíba do Sul, Rio de Janeiro, Larghi began his professional career at Botafogo in 2011, as a performance analyst. In January 2013, he was called up by technical director Carlos Alberto Parreira to join Luiz Felipe Scolari's staff in the Brazil national team.

After the 2014 FIFA World Cup, Larghi left the Seleção and spent some time in Europe. In 2016, he returned to Brazil and joined Oswaldo de Oliveira's staff at Sport.

Larghi remained as Oswaldo's assistant at Corinthians and Atlético Mineiro. On 9 February 2018, after Oswaldo's dismissal from the latter, Larghi was the only staff member kept at Galo; he was subsequently named interim manager.

On 25 June 2018, Larghi was appointed as permanent manager after over four months and 32 matches in charge, a record tenure for an interim manager in Brazil. On 17 October, however, he was sacked and replaced by Levir Culpi.

On 21 August 2020, after more than a year without a club, Larghi was named manager of Goiás in the first division, but was sacked after only 38 days in charge. On 5 December 2022, he was announced as an assistant manager of Corinthians. He left the following 20 April, after head coach Fernando Lázaro was removed from the role.

== Managerial statistics ==
As of 16 September 2020.

Managerial record by team and tenure
Team	Nat	From	To	Record								Ref
Team	Nat	From	To	G	W	D	L	GF	GA	GD	Win %	Ref
Atlético Mineiro (interim)	(Brazil)	9 February 2018	25 June 2018	32	17	7	8	49	28	+21	53.13	
Atlético Mineiro	(Brazil)	25 June 2018	17 October 2018	19	8	5	6	33	21	+12	42.11	
Goiás	(Brazil)	21 August 2020	28 September 2020	6	1	2	3	9	11	−2	16.67	
Total				57	26	14	17	91	60	+31	45.61	—
