= Fausto Vera =

Argentine footballer

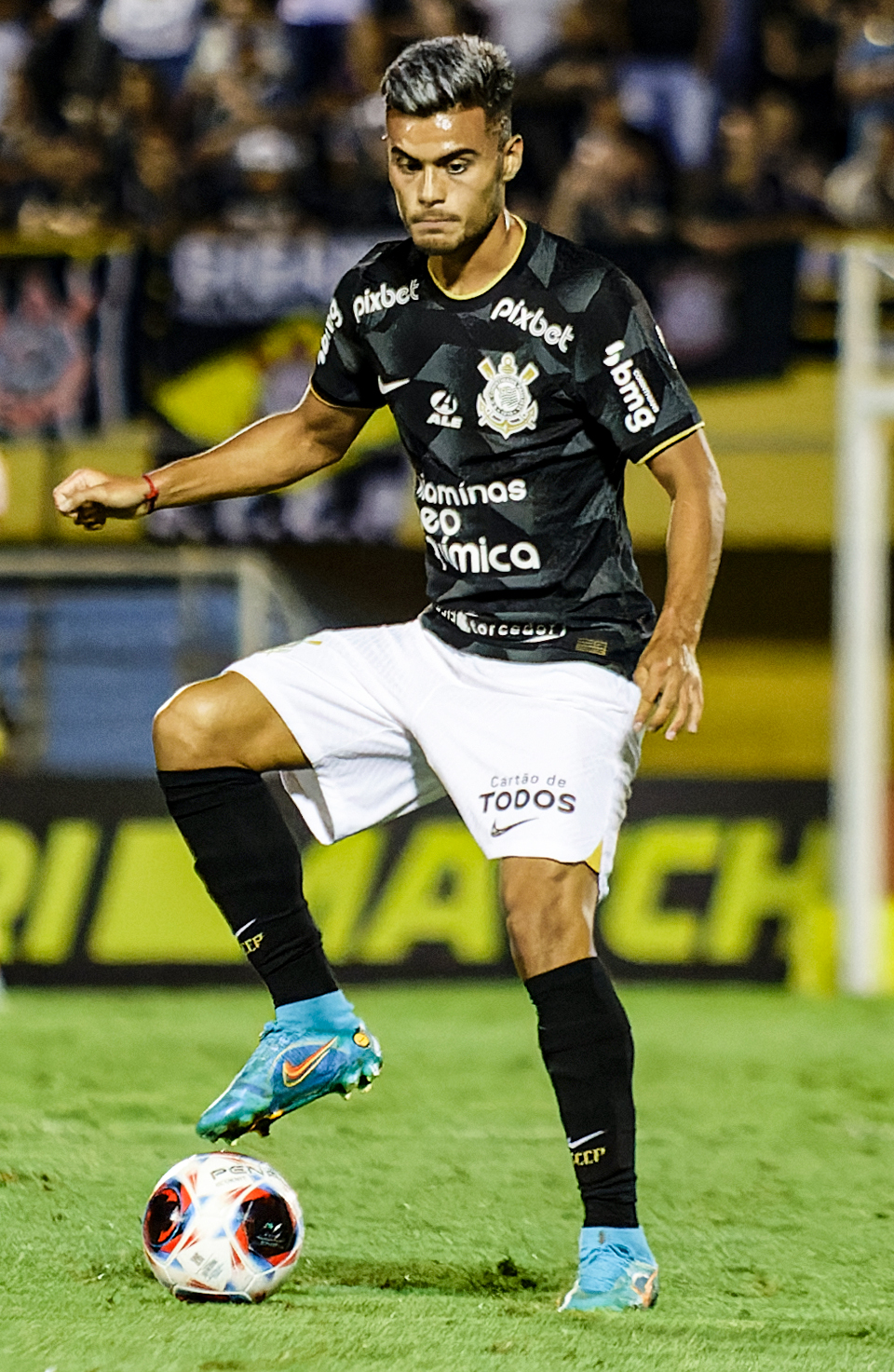
- Vera with Corinthians in 2023

Personal information
- Full name: Fausto Mariano Vera
- Date of birth: 26 March 2000 (age 26)
- Place of birth: Hurlingham, Argentina
- Height: 1.76 m (5 ft 9 in)
- Position: Midfielder

Team information
- Current team: River Plate (on loan from Atlético Mineiro)
- Number: 15

Youth career
- 2013–2018: Argentinos Juniors

Senior career*
Years	Team	Apps	(Gls)
2018–2022	Argentinos Juniors	61	(8)
2022–2024	Corinthians	64	(1)
2024–	Atlético Mineiro	39	(3)
2026–	→ River Plate (loan)	24	(0)

International career
2017	Argentina U17	3	(0)
2018–2019	Argentina U20	9	(1)
2019	Argentina U22	5	(1)
2020–2021	Argentina U23	9	(1)
Medal record
Representing Argentina
Men's Football
Pan American Games
Gold medal – first place	2019 Lima	Team competition
- * Club domestic league appearances and goals as of 17:51, 10 July 2026 (UTC)

Fausto Mariano Vera (born 26 March 2000) is an Argentine professional footballer who plays as a midfielder for Argentine Primera División club River Plate, on loan from Campeonato Brasileiro Série A club Atlético Mineiro.

== Club career ==
Vera started his career with Argentinos Juniors. He was promoted into their senior team during 2018–19, making his debut in the Argentine Primera División against Tigre in November 2018; coming off the bench for Ignacio Méndez in an away loss at the Estadio José Dellagiovanna. On 6 March 2020, on his twenty-fourth appearance, Vera scored his first senior goal in a win over Rosario Central.

On 26 July 2022, Vera joined Brazilian club Corinthians on a four-year deal.

On 16 July 2024, Vera signed a three-and-a-half-year deal with Atlético Mineiro. On 19 December 2025, River Plate announced the signing of Vera on a one-year loan deal with an option to buy.

== International career ==
In 2017, Vera was selected by the Argentina U17s for the 2017 South American U-17 Championship. They were knocked out at the first group stage, with Vera featuring in matches with Venezuela, Peru and Brazil. Vera won three caps for the Argentina U20s at the 2018 COTIF Tournament.

He also featured for the U19s and trained against the senior squad in 2017. In December 2018, Vera was selected for the 2019 South American U-20 Championship. In May 2019, Fernando Batista called up Vera for the 2019 FIFA U-20 World Cup. He scored in their 5–2 matchday one win over South Africa on 25 May; in appearance one of three.

Vera received a call-up for the 2019 Pan American Games with the U22s in Peru. He appeared five times, including once in the final in which he also scored, as they won the competition.

Vera appeared for the Argentina Olympic side at the 2020 Summer Olympics, starting every game as the team suffered a group stage elimination.

== Personal life ==
Vera is of Paraguayan descent through his paternal grandparents.

== Career statistics ==
As of 16 November 2025.

Club statistics
Club	Season	League			Cup		League Cup		Continental		State League		Other		Total	
Club	Season	Division	Apps	Goals	Apps	Goals	Apps	Goals	Apps	Goals	Apps	Goals	Apps	Goals	Apps	Goals
Argentinos Juniors	2018–19	Primera División	2	0	0	0	4	0	0	0	—		0	0	6	0
Argentinos Juniors	2019–20	Primera División	14	1	2	0	1	0	3 (Note: Appearance(s) in Copa Sudamericana)	0	—		0	0	20	1
Argentinos Juniors	2020–21	Primera División	9 (Note: Soccerway counts Copa de la Liga Profesional appearances as league appearances.)	1	0	0	—		—		—		—		9	1
Argentinos Juniors	2021	Primera División	11	1	0	0	—		2 (Note: Appearance(s) in Copa Libertadores)	0	—		—		13	1
Argentinos Juniors	2022	Primera División	25	5	2	0	—		—		—		—		27	5
Argentinos Juniors	Total		61	8	4	0	5	0	5	0	—		0	0	75	8
Corinthians	2022	Série A	18	0	6	0	—		2	0	—		—		26	0
Corinthians	2023	Série A	21	1	8	0	—		9 (Note: Six appearances in Copa Libertadores, three appearances in Copa Sudamericana)	0	9 (Note: Appearance(s) in Campeonato Paulista)	0	—		47	1
Corinthians	2024	Série A	6	0	3	0	—		4	1	10	0	—		23	1
Corinthians	Total		45	1	17	0	—		15	1	19	0	—		96	2
Atlético Mineiro	2024	Série A	20	2	—		—		7	0	—		—		27	2
Atlético Mineiro	2025	Série A	18	1	4	0	—		9	0	1 (Note: Appearance(s) in Campeonato Mineiro)	0	—		32	1
Atlético Mineiro	Total		38	3	4	0	—		16	0	1	0	—		59	3
Career total			144	12	25	0	5	0	36	1	20	0	0	0	230	13

== Honours ==
Atlético Mineiro

- Campeonato Mineiro: 2025

Argentina U23

- Pan American Games: 2019
- Pre-Olympic Tournament: 2020
