= Loreny =

Brazilian politician (born 1991)

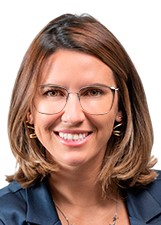
- Loreny in 2024

Member of the Chamber of Deputies
- In office 9 April 2024 – 28 July 2024
- Preceded by: Paulinho da Força
- Succeeded by: Paulinho da Força
- Constituency: São Paulo

Personal details
- Born: 11 July 1991 (age 35)
- Party: Solidarity (since 2021)

Loreny Mayara Caetano Roberto (born 11 July 1991), known mononymously as Loreny, is a Brazilian politician. From April to July 2024, she was a member of the Chamber of Deputies. From 2017 to 2020, she was a municipal councillor of Taubaté.
