= Guilherme Biro (footballer, born 2004) =

Brazilian footballer

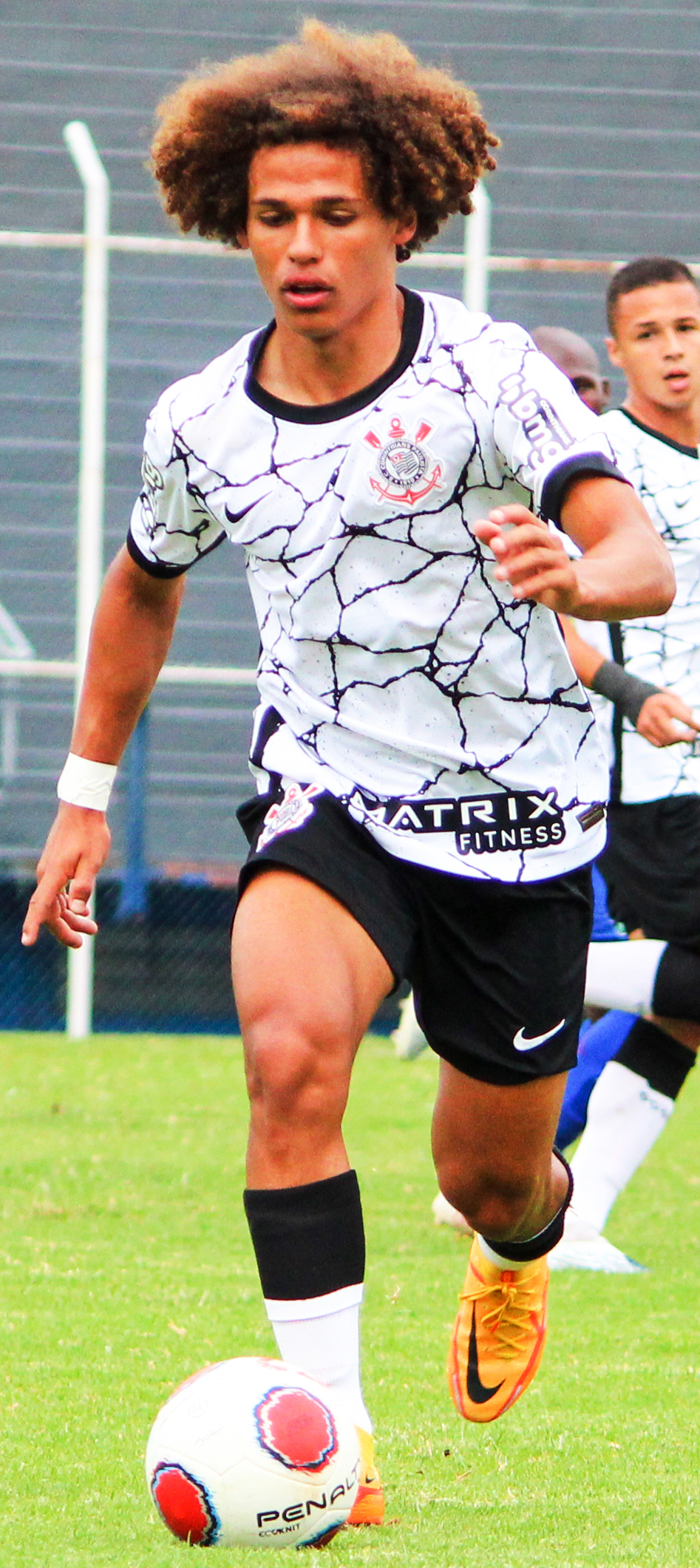
- Guilherme Biro with Corinthians in 2022

Personal information
- Full name: Guilherme Sucigan Mafra Cunha
- Date of birth: 20 April 2004 (age 22)
- Place of birth: Campinas, Brazil
- Height: 1.73 m (5 ft 8 in)
- Position: Winger

Team information
- Current team: Ajman (on loan from Sharjah)
- Number: 20

Youth career
- 2016–2022: Corinthians

Senior career*
Years	Team	Apps	(Gls)
2022–2025	Corinthians	16	(0)
2024–2025	→ Sharjah (loan)	21	(3)
2025–	Sharjah	10	(0)
2026–	→ Ajman (loan)	0	(0)

International career^{‡}
2019	Brazil U15	6	(0)
2021	Brazil U17		
2023	Brazil U20	8	(1)
2023	Brazil U23	5	(1)
Medal record
Men's football
Representing Brazil
South American U-20 Championship
Winner	2023 Colombia
Pan American Games
Winner	2023 Santiago
- * Club domestic league appearances and goals as of 25 August 2022 ‡ National team caps and goals as of 25 August 2022

Guilherme Sucigan Mafra Cunha (born 20 April 2004), commonly known as Guilherme Biro or simply Biro, is a Brazilian footballer who plays as a winger for Ajman, on loan from Sharjah FC. He is a left footed player, but he has been successfully deployed on both flanks, also playing as a left-back on a number of occasions.

== Club career ==
In December 2020 Guilherme Biro signed his first professional contract with Corinthians until the end of 2023. He made his first team debut on 2 July 2022 in 0–4 away defeat against Fluminense in Série A.

== International career ==
Guilherme Biro was called up to the under-15 team in 2019, and featured in the 2019 South American U-15 Championship.

== Honours ==
Sharjah

- AFC Champions League Two: 2024–25
- UAE Super Cup: 2025
- Qatar-UAE Super Cup: 2026

Brazil U15

- South American U-15 Championship: 2019

Corinthians U17

- Campeonato Paulista U-17: 2021

Brazil U20

- South American U-20 Championship: 2023

Brasil U23

- Pan American Games: 2023

== Club ==
As of 29 August 2024.

Club	Season	League			State League (Note: Includes Campeonato Paulista)		Cup (Note: Includes Copa do Brasil)		Continental		Total	
Club	Season	Division	Apps	Goals	Apps	Goals	Apps	Goals	Apps	Goals	Apps	Goals
Corinthians	2022	Série A	2	0	0	0	0	0	0 (Note: Appearances in Copa Sudamericana)	0	2	0
Corinthians	2023	Série A	11	0	0	0	1	0	5 (Note: Appearances in Copa Libertadores and Copa Sudamericana)	0	17	0
Corinthians	2024	Série A	3	0	3	0	3	0	1 (Note: Appearances in Copa Sudamericana)	0	10	0
Career total			16	0	3	0	4	0	6	0	29	0
