= Caetano =

- Pronunciation: European Portuguese: [kɐjˈtɐnu] Brazilian Portuguese: [kajˈtɐnu]

Origin
- Meaning: Caietanus, "from Caieta" (now Gaeta)

Other names
- Related names: Gaetano, Cajetan, Cayetano, Gaëtan

Caetano is a Portuguese given name and surname derived from Latin Caietanus. It also appears in Lusophone place names named after Saint Cajetan (São Caetano in Portuguese).

== People with the given name Caetano ==
- Caetano (footballer, born 1972), José Caetano Mendes, Brazilian football goalkeeper
- Caetano Prósperi Calil, Brazilian footballer playing for AC Siena
- Caetano Veloso, Brazilian composer and singer

== People with the surname Caetano ==
- Ana Luiza Caetano (born 2002), Brazilian archer
- Breno Caetano, normally known as Breninho (born 1997), Brazilian footballer
- Caetano (footballer, born 1999), João Victor Andrade Caetano, Brazilian football defender
- Israel Adrián Caetano, Uruguayan-born filmmaker of Portuguese descent
- Ivoneide Caetano (born 1972), Brazilian politician
- Loreny (born 1991), Brazilian politician
- Marcelo Caetano, prime minister of Portugal from 1968 to 1974
- Raffael Caetano de Araújo, Brazilian free agent footballer
- Robson Caetano da Silva (born 1964), Brazilian sprinter
- Rodrigo Caetano (born 1970), Brazilian former footballer and football executive
- Rui Caetano, Portuguese footballer
- Victor Caetano (born 1997), Brazilian footballer

== Toponyms ==
- São Caetano (Madalena), a parish in Madalena, Azores
- São Caetano (Cantanhede), a parish in Cantanheda, Azores
- São Caetano do Sul, a city in Brazil

== Other meanings ==
- Storm Caetano, November 2024, mainly in France

== See also ==
- Caetano v. Massachusetts, a Supreme Court of the United States gun control case
- Salvador Caetano, a coachbuilder and vehicle distributor based in Portugal
