= Nathan (footballer, born August 1999) =

Brazilian footballer

Personal information
- Full name: Nathan Palafoz de Sousa
- Date of birth: 4 August 1999 (age 27)
- Place of birth: Rio de Janeiro, Brazil
- Height: 1.87 m (6 ft 2 in)
- Position: Forward

Team information
- Current team: Cianorte

Youth career
- 2015–2019: Nova Iguaçu
- 2017–2019: → Corinthians (loan)
- 2019–2020: Corinthians

Senior career*
Years	Team	Apps	(Gls)
2017	Nova Iguaçu	2	(0)
2020–2023	Corinthians	0	(0)
2020–2022	→ Racing Ferrol (loan)	44	(6)
2022	→ Avaí (loan)	7	(0)
2023	→ Nova Iguaçu (loan)	8	(1)
2023	Riteriai	14	(1)
2024	Oliveira do Hospital	10	(1)
2024	America-RJ	0	(0)
2025–	Cianorte	0	(0)
- * Club domestic league appearances and goals as of 16:10, 5 February 2025 (UTC)

Nathan Palafoz de Sousa (born 4 August 1999), simply known as Nathan, is a Brazilian professional footballer who plays as a forward for Cianorte.

== Club career ==
Nathan was born in Rio de Janeiro, and began his career at Nova Iguaçu at the age of 15. He made his first team debut on 18 January 2017, coming on as a second-half substitute in a 2–2 Campeonato Carioca away draw against Campos.

On 26 June 2017, Nathan moved on loan to Corinthians, being initially assigned to the under-20s. He was bought outright in April 2019, and renewed his contract until 2023 on 29 July 2020.

On 12 August 2020, Nathan joined Spanish Segunda División B side Racing de Ferrol on loan. His loan was extended for a further year in July 2021, but he was mainly used as a substitute.

On 15 July 2022, after returning from loan, Nathan signed for fellow Série A side Avaí until the end of the year, also in a temporary deal. He made his debut in the category four days later, replacing Eduardo in a 1–0 away loss against Ceará.

== Career statistics ==
As of 5 February 2025

Club	Season	League			State League		Cup		Continental		Other		Total	
Club	Season	Division	Apps	Goals	Apps	Goals	Apps	Goals	Apps	Goals	Apps	Goals	Apps	Goals
Nova Iguaçu	2017	Carioca	—		2	0	—		—		—		2	0
Racing Ferrol	2020–21	Segunda División B	17	2	—		—		—		—		17	2
Racing Ferrol	2021–22	Primera División RFEF	27	4	—		1	0	—		1 (Note: Appearance(s) in the promotion play-offs)	0	29	4
Racing Ferrol	Total		44	6	—		1	0	—		1	0	46	6
Avaí	2022	Série A	7	0	—		—		—		—		7	0
Nova Iguaçu	2023	Série D	0	0	8	1	0	0	—		—		8	1
Riteriai	2023	A Lyga	14	1	—		2	3	—		—		16	4
Oliveira do Hospital	2023–24	Liga 3	10	1	—		2	0	—		—		12	1
America-RJ	2024	Carioca Série A2	—		0	0	—		—		—		0	0
Cianorte	2025	Série D	0	0	0	0	—		—		—		0	0
Career total			75	8	10	1	5	3	0	0	1	0	91	12
