= Matheus Araújo =

Brazilian footballer (born 2002)

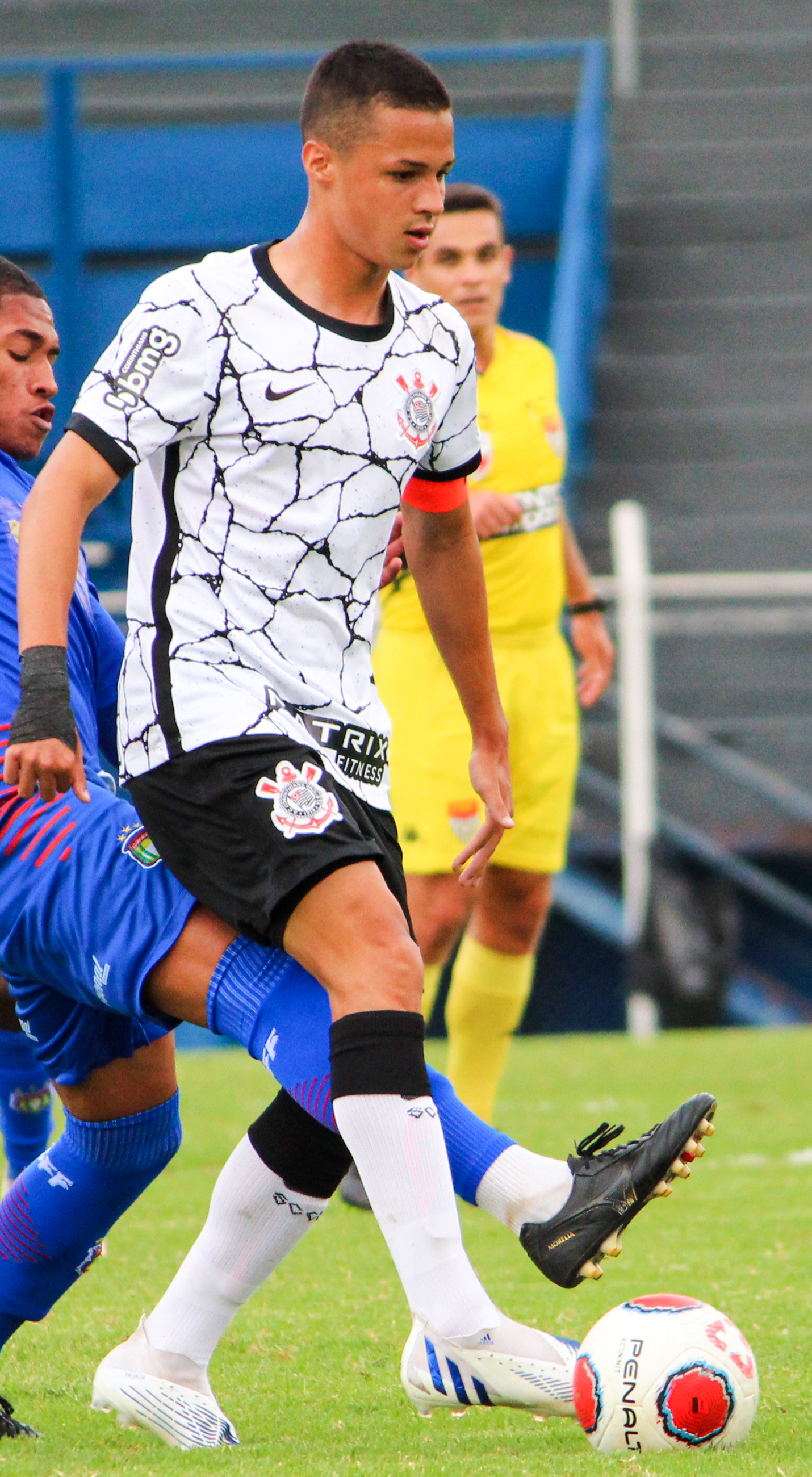
- Matheus Araújo

Personal information
- Full name: Matheus de Araújo Andrade
- Date of birth: 22 May 2002 (age 24)
- Place of birth: Osasco, Brazil
- Height: 1.76 m (5 ft 9 in)
- Position: Midfielder

Team information
- Current team: Ceará
- Number: 8

Youth career
- Corinthians

Senior career*
Years	Team	Apps	(Gls)
2021–2024	Corinthians	31	(1)
2025–	Ceará	52	(10)

International career^{‡}
2019	Brazil U17	3	(0)
- * Club domestic league appearances and goals as of 18 November 2026 ‡ National team caps and goals as of 14:27, 3 June 2021 (UTC)

Matheus de Araújo Andrade (born 22 May 2002), known as Matheus Araújo, is a Brazilian footballer who currently plays as a midfielder for Ceará.

== Career statistics ==
=== Club ===
As of 29 August 2024.

Club	Season	League			State League		Cup		Continental		Total	
Club	Season	Division	Apps	Goals	Apps	Goals	Apps	Goals	Apps	Goals	Apps	Goals
Corinthians	2021	Série A	0	0	1	0	0	0	0	0	1	0
Corinthians	2022	Série A	0	0	0	0	1	0	0	0	1	0
Corinthians	2023	Série A	16	1	4	0	5	0	6 (Note: Appearances in Copa Sudamericana and Copa Libertadores)	1	31	1
Corinthians	2024	Série A	4	0	6	0	1	0	1 (Note: Appearances in Copa Sudamericana)	0	12	0
Career total			20	1	10	0	7	0	7	1	45	1

== Honours ==
=== Clubs ===
Ceará

- Campeonato Cearense: 2025
