= Rodrigo Varanda =

Brazilian footballer

Personal information
- Full name: Rodrigo Santos Varanda
- Date of birth: 11 January 2003 (age 23)
- Place of birth: Guarulhos, Brazil
- Height: 1.80 m (5 ft 11 in)
- Position: Winger

Team information
- Current team: Borneo Samarinda
- Number: 7

Youth career
- 2009–2021: Corinthians

Senior career*
Years	Team	Apps	(Gls)
2021–2023	Corinthians	10	(1)
2021	→ São Bernardo (loan)	6	(0)
2022	→ Chapecoense (loan)	3	(0)
2022–2023	→ Akritas Chlorakas (loan)	10	(1)
2023	→ América Mineiro (loan)	12	(2)
2024	América Mineiro	7	(1)
2024	→ Santa Clara (loan)	0	(0)
2025	São José	11	(3)
2025	Amazonas	9	(2)
2025	Retrô	2	(0)
2025–2026	Sitra Club	5	(0)
2026	Al-Ahli Club	0	(0)
2026–	Borneo Samarinda	1	(0)

International career
2019	Brazil U16	3	(0)
- * Club domestic league appearances and goals as of 5 September 2026

Rodrigo Santos Varanda (born 11 January 2003) is a Brazilian professional footballer who plays as a winger for Super League club Borneo Samarinda.

== Career ==
Varanda started his career when he was six years old at Corinthians' youth squad, playing futsal before changing full time to the football team.

He made his professional debut for the club in a 2021 Campeonato Paulista away match against Red Bull Bragantino on 28 February 2021. He scored his first goal for the club in the next game as an equalizer against Corinthians' biggest rival Palmeiras at Neo Química Arena on 3 March.

In September 2024, Varanda announced its termination of the loan contract with Santa Clara, and with América Mineiro, holder of its federative rights. The athlete claimed the need to take care of his mental health. Varanda returned to his career in 2025, signing a contract with São José.

== Honours ==
Amazonas

- Campeonato Amazonense: 2025
