= Fernando Lázaro =

Brazilian football manager

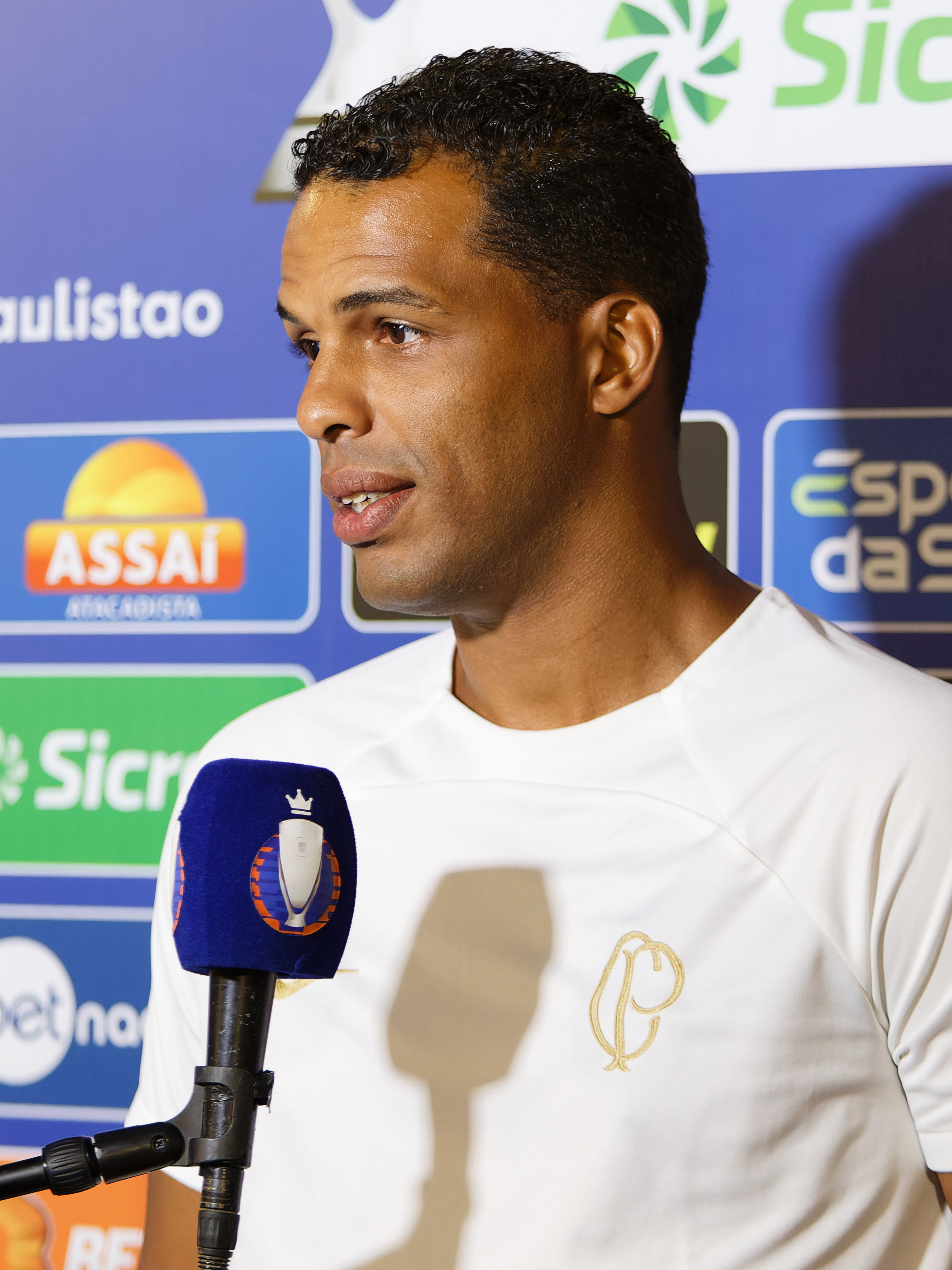
- Lázaro in 2023

Personal information
- Full name: Fernando Lázaro Rodrigues Alves
- Date of birth: 3 June 1981 (age 45)
- Place of birth: São Paulo, Brazil

Team information
- Current team: Grêmio (performance coordinator)

Managerial career
- Years: Team
- 2016: Corinthians (assistant)
- 2019: Lyon (assistant)
- 2021: Corinthians (caretaker)
- 2022: Corinthians (caretaker)
- 2023: Corinthians
- 2023: Corinthians (assistant)

Fernando Lázaro Rodrigues Alves (born June 1981) is a Brazilian football coach and performance analyst. He is the current performance coordinator of Grêmio.

== Career ==
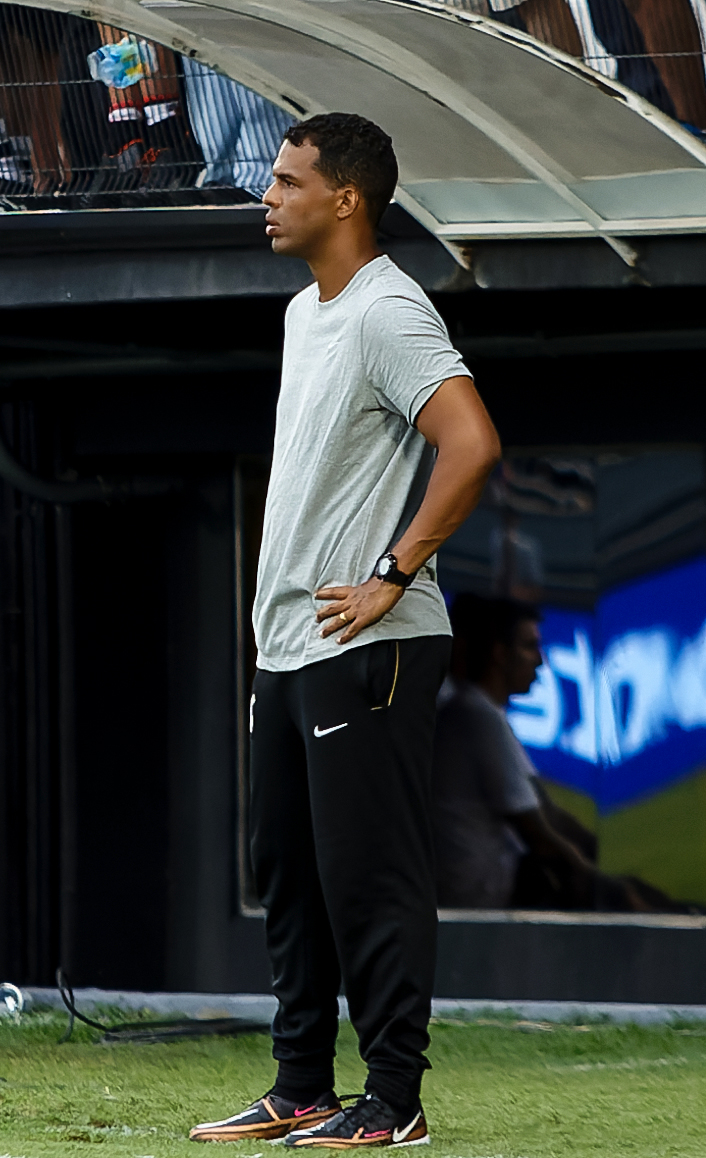
Lázaro as manager of Corinthians in 2023

Born in São Paulo, Lázaro started working at Corinthians in 1999 at the age of just 17, as a part of the computing department. He worked at the club until 2016, when he was invited by the Brazil national team manager Tite to join his technical staff as a performance analyst; before joining the national side, he also worked as Fábio Carille's assistant.

In May 2019, Lázaro was named Sylvinho's assistant at Lyon, but left the club when the manager was sacked on 15 October 2019. He returned to Corinthians on 11 January 2021, after being named coordinator of Cifut (Centro de Inteligência do Futebol – Football Intelligence Center).

On 17 May 2021, after the dismissal of Vagner Mancini, Lázaro was named interim head coach of Timão's main squad. His first match in charge of the club occurred three days later, a 5–0 home routing of Sport Huancayo, for the year's Copa Sudamericana. After Sylvinho was hired as Corinthians' new manager on 23 May, Lázaro coached the club one further match before returning to his original position.

In February 2022, Lázaro was again named interim head coach of Corinthians, after Sylvinho was sacked. He returned to the head of performance analysis role late in the month, after the appointment of Vítor Pereira.

On 20 November 2022, Lázaro was named the permanent head coach of Timão for the 2023 season. On 20 April 2023, he was removed from the role of head coach, being named permanent assistant manager, and left the club on 29 December to join Grêmio as a coordinator.

== Personal life ==
Lázaro is the son of former footballer and 1970 World Cup winner Zé Maria.

== Managerial statistics ==
As of 19 April 2023

Managerial record by team and tenure
Team	Nat.	From	To	Record								Ref
Team	Nat.	From	To	G	W	D	L	GF	GA	GD	Win %	Ref
Corinthians (interim)	(Brazil)	17 May 2021	26 May 2021	2	2	0	0	9	0	+9	100.00	
Corinthians (interim)	(Brazil)	4 February 2022	27 February 2022	5	4	1	0	10	4	+6	80.00	
Corinthians	(Brazil)	20 November 2022	20 April 2023	17	8	5	4	25	15	+10	47.06	
Career total				24	14	6	4	44	19	+25	58.33	—
