= 2026 SC Corinthians Paulista season =

Corinthians 2026 football season

Corinthians
2026 season
- President: Osmar Stabile
- Manager: Dorival Júnior (until 5 April); Fernando Diniz (6 April – 7 October); William Batista (caretaker, 9 October – 11 October); Clarence Seedorf (from 11 October)
- Stadium: Neo Química Arena
- Série A: 16th
- Copa do Brasil: Round of 16
- Supercopa do Brasil: Winners
- Campeonato Paulista: Semi-finals
- Copa Libertadores: Quarter-finals
- Top goalscorer: League: Kaio César (6); All: Gustavo Henrique; Yuri Alberto (9 each)
- Highest home attendance: 47,549 vs Estudiantes (16 September 2026)
- Lowest home attendance: 13,788 vs Bahia (28 January 2026) (Note: This attendance took place at Vila Belmiro, Santos, which has a 16,068 capacity. Corinthians' lowest attendance at Neo Química Arena was 26,985 against Red Bull Bragantino on 12 February 2026.)
- Average home league attendance: 38,942 (Note: It includes a home match at Vila Belmiro, Santos, which has a 16,068 capacity. Corinthians has an average attendance of 40,421 in 17 matches at Neo Química Arena (it also includes one match with a reduced capacity against São Paulo due to the lower west stand being behind closed doors due to a punishment by STJD).)
Home colors	Away colors	Third colors

The 2026 season is the 117th season in the history of Sport Club Corinthians Paulista. It covers the period from January 2026 to December 2026. There was a mid-season break due to the 2026 FIFA World Cup in June–July.

Corinthians is coming off a successful campaign by achieving a national double after winning the Copa do Brasil (fourth overall) and state league (31st overall). The club made its return to the Supercopa do Brasil, as the competition was not held between 1992 and 2019 (a period in which Corinthians won six league titles and three cup titles).

This season marked the first major change in years at the Brazilian football calendar. The Brasileirão started in January, before the end of the state leagues. The Copa do Brasil was restructured to feature more teams (with all clubs from the Série A joining the competition later than usual), as well as having its final match in a neutral venue. The state leagues also had a major reduction in matchdays to better accommodate the calendar.

The club is expected to hold elections in November to determine the new president and deliberative council for the 2027–2029 term.

== Background ==
=== Board and management changes ===
On 23 December 2025, the club announced the resignation of football executive director Fabinho Soldado via a mutual agreement. He was in charge of the position since January 2024. Four days later, then CEO of Fortaleza Marcelo Paz was announced as his substitute.

On 13 April, Júlio César (who previously joined the club's youth squad as a goalkeeper in 2002 and played for the club between 2005 and 2014) was announced as the new football manager. He will work alongside Paz to integrate the athletes and technical staff with the executive portion of the football department.

On 20 October, Paz was sacked from his position. The decision was made considering the recurring poor performances and the torcidas organizadas (mainly Gaviões da Fiel) pressure. Júlio César will take charge of his duties in an interim manner until the end of the season.

=== Kits ===
Supplier: Nike / Main sponsor: Esportes da Sorte (suspended as of 6 October), (Note: After the Provisional Measure 1394/2026 was enacted on 25 September 2026, all sports betting sites (such as Esportes da Sorte) were forbidden in the country effective 6 October. The measure is set to expire 60 days after its enactment unless extended or made permanent. Esportes da Sorte sponsorship originally ran until December 2029.) Jota.ai (punctual sponsor against Internacional on 7 October) and Shopee (from October 11 until the end of the season).

Kits from the 2026 season
Home	Home alt.^{1}	Home alt.^{2}	Home alt.^{3}	Away	Away alt.^{1}	Away alt.^{2}	Third	Third alt.	Goalkeeper^{1}	Goalkeeper^{2}

Kits from the 2025 season
Home	Home alt.^{1}	Home alt.^{2}	Away	Away alt.	Third	Goalkeeper^{1}	Goalkeeper^{2}	Goalkeeper^{3}

==== Kit information ====
This is Nike's 24th year supplying Corinthians kit, having taken over from Topper at the beginning of the 2003 season. The deal was renewed for another 10 seasons in June 2025.

- Home: The club revealed their new home kit for the 2026 season on 8 May. The kit maintains Corinthians's traditional colours of black and white. The shirt's body and sleeves are white, with black details based on Nike's main template for the season, and is complemented by black shorts and white socks. The new kit pays tribute to the 50th anniversary of the "Corinthian Invasion" (pt-br / Invasão Corinthiana) in 1976, when thousands of Corinthians fans (estimated between 40,000 and 70,000) traveled from São Paulo to Rio de Janeiro to watch the match against Fluminense at the Maracanã Stadium, in that year's national championship semifinals. The Corinthians' crest is the same one used during that time, returning to its regular position on the left chest, while the Nike logo also returns to the right chest.
- Away: Corinthians' away kit was released on 8 May as well and it also pays tribute to the 50th anniversary of the iconic match. The shirt features the classic black design with white stripes, including the sleeves, marking that layout's return since the 2023 season. It is expected to be complemented by black or white shorts and black socks.
- Third: On 18 September, Corinthians released their third kit. The kit maintains the Invasão Corinthiana theme as it pays homage to Tobias, who played for the club between 1974 and 1980. He was the club's goalkeeper during the match and one of its heroes as he saved two penalties during the penalty shoot-out to help qualify Corinthians to the finals. It resembles Tobias' 1976 kit with a light blue shirt and socks, alongside black shorts. The kit will make its debut in a home match against Fluminense, the opponent of the original match. Despite being designed for the outfield players, the goalkeepers will be responsible for wearing the kit on its first match.
- GK: The new goalkeeper kits are based on Nike's goalkeeper template for the season. The club's crest is also the same one used in other kits mentioned above.

==== Kit usage ====
As of 18 November 2026

Kit	Combination	Usage
Kits from the 2026 season
Home	White shirt, black shorts and white socks.	Campeonato Brasileiro: used at home against Atlético Mineiro, Remo, Athletico Paranaense, Cruzeiro, Santos, Fluminense, Vitória and Mirassol; used away against Flamengo and Palmeiras.; Copa do Brasil: used at home against Barra and Internacional.; Copa Libertadores: used at home against Platense, Rosario Central and Estudiantes.; Friendly: used away against Cascavel.
Home alt^{1}	White shirt, white shorts and white socks.	Campeonato Brasileiro: used away against Botafogo and Vasco da Gama.; Copa Libertadores: used away against Peñarol, Rosario Central and Estudiantes.
Home alt^{2}	White shirt, white shorts and black socks.	Campeonato Brasileiro: used away against Grêmio.
Home alt^{3}	White shirt, black shorts and black socks.	Campeonato Brasileiro: used away against Internacional.; Copa do Brasil: used away against Internacional.
Away	Black shirt with white stripes, black shorts and black socks.	Campeonato Brasileiro: used at home against São Paulo, Chapecoense and Botafogo; used away against São Paulo.
Away alt.^{1}	Black shirt with white stripes, white shorts and black socks.	Campeonato Brasileiro: used away against Bahia and Red Bull Bragantino.
Away alt.^{2}	Black shirt with white stripes, white shorts and white socks.	Campeonato Brasileiro: used away against Coritiba.
Third	Light blue shirt, black shorts and light blue socks.	
Third alt.	Light blue shirt, light blue shorts and light blue socks.	Campeonato Brasileiro: used at home against Fluminense (goalkeepers only).
Goalkeeper^{1}	Purple shirt, purple shorts and purple socks.	Campeonato Brasileiro: used at home against Atlético Mineiro, Chapecoense, Mirassol and Botafogo; used away against Botafogo, Bahia, Red Bull Bragantino, Coritiba, Flamengo and São Paulo.; Copa do Brasil: used at home against Barra; used away against Internacional.; Copa Libertadores: used at home against Platense, Rosario Central and Estudiantes; used away against Peñarol and Estudiantes.
Goalkeeper^{2}	Grey shirt, grey shorts and grey socks.	Campeonato Brasileiro: used at home against São Paulo, Remo, Athletico Paranaense, Cruzeiro, Santos and Vitória; used away against Grêmio, Internacional, Palmeiras and Vasco da Gama.; Copa do Brasil: used at home against Internacional.; Friendly: used away against Cascavel.

Kit	Combination	Usage
Kits from the 2025 season
Home	White shirt with black sleeves, black shorts and white socks.	Campeonato Brasileiro: used at home against Bahia, Red Bull Bragantino, Coritiba, Flamengo, Internacional, Palmeiras and Vasco da Gama.; Supercopa do Brasil: used against Flamengo.; Campeonato Paulista: used at home against São Paulo, Capivariano and Palmeiras; used away against Portuguesa.; Copa Libertadores: used at home against Santa Fe and Peñarol.
Home alt.^{1}	White shirt with black sleeves, white shorts and white socks.	Campeonato Brasileiro: used away against Athletico Paranaense, Chapecoense and Vitória.; Campeonato Paulista: used away against Red Bull Bragantino and Novorizontino.
Home alt.^{2}	White shirt with black sleeves, black shorts and black socks.	Campeonato Brasileiro: used away against Cruzeiro and Fluminense.; Copa do Brasil: used away against Barra.; Copa Libertadores: used away against Santa Fe.
Away	Black shirt with white sleeves, black shorts and black socks.	
Away alt.	Black shirt with white sleeves, white shorts and white socks.	Campeonato Paulista: used away against Velo Clube and São Bernardo.
Third	Black shirt, black shorts and black socks; all details in orange	Campeonato Brasileiro: used away against Santos and Mirassol.; Campeonato Paulista: used at home against Ponte Preta; used away against Santos.; Copa Libertadores: used away against Platense.
Goalkeeper^{1}	Yellow shirt, yellow shorts and yellow socks.	Campeonato Brasileiro: used at home against Bahia, Red Bull Bragantino, Coritiba, Flamengo, Internacional Palmeiras and Vasco da Gama; used away against Athletico Paranaense, Fluminense and Vitória.; Copa do Brasil: used away against Barra.; Supercopa do Brasil: used against Flamengo.; Campeonato Paulista: used at home against Ponte Preta, São Paulo and Palmeiras; used away against Red Bull Bragantino and Santos.; Copa Libertadores: used at home against Santa Fe; used away against Santa Fe.
Goalkeeper^{2}	Black shirt, black shorts and black socks.	Campeonato Paulista: used at home against Capivariano; used away against Velo Clube.; Copa Libertadores: used at home against Peñarol.
Goalkeeper^{3}	Orange shirt, orange shorts and orange socks.	Campeonato Brasileiro: used away against Cruzeiro, Santos, Chapecoense and Mirassol.; Campeonato Paulista: used away against São Bernardo, Portuguesa and Novorizontino.; Copa Libertadores: used away against Platense and Rosario Central.

== Squad ==
As of 11 August 2026

Note: Flags indicate national team as defined under FIFA eligibility rules; some limited exceptions apply. Players may hold more than one non-FIFA nationality.

No.	Pos.	Nation	Player
1	GK	BRA	Hugo Souza
2	DF	BRA	Matheuzinho
3	DF	BRA	Gabriel Paulista
4	DF	BRA	João Pedro
5	DF	BRA	André Ramalho
7	MF	BRA	Breno Bidon
8	MF	ARG	Rodrigo Garro (captain)
9	FW	BRA	Yuri Alberto
10	FW	NED	Memphis Depay
11	MF	BRA	Vitinho
13	DF	BRA	Gustavo Henrique
14	MF	BRA	Raniele
18	FW	BRA	Pedro Raul
19	MF	PER	André Carrillo
20	DF	URU	Pedro Milans
21	DF	BRA	Matheus Bidu
23	MF	BRA	Matheus Pereira (on loan from Fortaleza)

No.	Pos.	Nation	Player
26	DF	ARG	Fabrizio Angileri
29	MF	BRA	Allan (on loan from Flamengo)
31	FW	BRA	Kayke
35	MF	BRA	Charles
37	FW	BRA	Kaio César (on loan from Al-Hilal)
40	GK	BRA	Felipe Longo
46	DF	BRA	Hugo
49	MF	BRA	André
52	MF	MAR	Zakaria Labyad
54	MF	BRA	Luiz Gustavo
55	DF	BRA	Iago Machado
56	FW	BRA	Gui Negão
59	DF	BRA	João Vitor
61	FW	BRA	Dieguinho
77	MF	ENG	Jesse Lingard
80	MF	BRA	Alex Santana

=== Squad number changes ===
Notes:

- Squad numbers last updated on 21 February 2026.
- Player^{*} – Player who joined Corinthians permanently or on loan during the season.
- Player^{†} – Player who departed Corinthians permanently or on loan during the season.

Player	Pos.	Prev. No.	New No.	Previous player to wear number	Notes
(Brazil) Breno Bidon	MF	27	7	Maycon (2025)	Maycon departed the club (December 2025)
(Brazil) Vitinho	MF	29	11	Ángel Romero (2025)	Romero departed the club (December 2025)
(Brazil) Pedro Raul	FW	—	18	Paulinho (2024)	Paulinho changed his number (April 2024)
(Brazil) Gabriel Paulista^{*}	DF	—	20	Pedro Raul (2025)	Pedro Raul left on loan (February 2025)
(Brazil) Matheus Pereira^{*}	MF	—	23	Fagner (2024)	Fagner left on loan (January 2025)
(Brazil) Gabriel Paulista^{*}	DF	20	3	Félix Torres (2025)	Torres left on loan (January 2026)
(Uruguay) Pedro Milans^{*}	DF	—	20	Gabriel Paulista (2026)	Gabriel Paulista took the number 3 shirt (January 2026)
(Brazil) João Pedro	DF	47	4	Caetano (2024)	Caetano departed the club (January 2025)
(Brazil) Kaio César^{*}	FW	—	37	Ryan (2026)	Ryan left on loan (January 2026)
(Brazil) Allan^{*}	MF	—	29	Vitinho (2025)	Vitinho took the number 11 shirt (January 2026)
(Morocco) Zakaria Labyad^{*}	MF	—	52	Fernando Vera (2025)	Vera returned to the youth squad (Mid 2025)
(England) Jesse Lingard^{*}	MF	—	77	Igor Coronado (2025)	Coronado departed the club (June 2025)

== Managerial changes ==
On 5 April, Dorival Júnior was fired right after a 1–0 home defeat against Internacional, which extended the club's winless run to nine matches.

The following day, Fernando Diniz was announced as the club's new manager. He previously played for the club as a midfielder between 1997 and 1998. On 7 October, Diniz was sacked after a 2–1 away loss to Internacional, which marked the club's seventh loss in a row in the Brasileirão and also extended the winless streak to eight matches, following the club's elimination at the quarterfinals of the Libertadores on 16 September. The club's current U-20 coach William Batista was announced as the caretaker for their next training sessions and the next match against Palmeiras on 11 October.

On 11 October, former Netherlands international footballer Clarence Seedorf was announced as the club's new manager. Due to a delay in his registration, Seedorf wasn't able to coach the team against Vitória on 19 October (with assistant manager Leonardo Porto filling in) and only made his official debut on 24 October against Vasco da Gama.

Manager	Signed from	Date of signing	Date of departure	Signed with	Source
(Brazil) Dorival Júnior	Free agent	28 April 2025	5 April 2026	—	
(Brazil) Fernando Diniz	Free agent	6 April 2026	7 October 2026	—	
(Brazil) William Batista	Corinthians U-20 head coach (caretaker)	9 October 2026	11 October 2026	Returned to the U-20 team	
(Netherlands) Clarence Seedorf	Free agent	11 October 2026	—	—	

== Transfers ==
=== Transfers in ===
#	Position:	Player	Transferred from	Fee	Date	Team	Source
20	DF	(Brazil) Gabriel Paulista	(Turkey) Beşiktaş	Free transfer (Rescinded contract)	11 January 2026	First team	
	DF	(Ecuador) Diego Palacios	(Ukraine) Karpaty Lviv	Loan cancelled (Note: Diego Palacios was on loan since August 2025 until June 2026.)	21 January 2026	First team	
20	DF	(Uruguay) Pedro Milans	(Uruguay) Peñarol	Free transfer (End of contract)	21 January 2026	First team	
	DF	(Brazil) Juninho	(Belarus) Maxline Vitebsk	Loan cancelled (Note: Juninho was on loan since March 2025 until December 2026.)	10 February 2026	Academy	
26	DF	(Argentina) Fabrizio Angileri	Free agent (Note: Fabrizio Angileri's contract with Corinthians ended on 31 December 2025 and it wasn't renewed. He became a free agent and later resigned with the club.)	Free transfer	11 February 2026	First team	
52	MF	(Morocco) Zakaria Labyad	Free agent	Free transfer	20 February 2026	First team	
77	MF	(England) Jesse Lingard	Free agent	Free transfer	6 March 2026	First team	
	DF	(Brazil) Léo Mana	(Brazil) Criciúma	End of loan (Note: Léo Mana was on loan since 14 August 2025 until 31 July 2026.)	1 August 2026	First team	
10	FW	(Netherlands) Memphis Depay	Free agent (Note: Memphis Depay's contract with Corinthians ended on 31 July 2026. Contract negotiations originally took place until 11 August, when it was announced by the club that they would not renew it. However, they were resumed a few days later and on 18 August the contract renewal was officially announced.)	Free transfer	18 August 2026	First team	

=== Loans in ===
#	Position	Player	Loaned from	Date	Loan expires	Team	Source
23	MF	(Brazil) Matheus Pereira	(Brazil) Fortaleza	16 January 2026	31 December 2026	First team	
37	FW	(Brazil) Kaio César	(Saudi Arabia) Al-Hilal	29 January 2026	31 December 2026	First team	
29	MF	(Brazil) Allan	(Brazil) Flamengo	11 February 2026	31 December 2026	First team	

=== Transfers out ===
#	Position	Player	Transferred to	Fee	Date	Team	Source
50	GK	(Brazil) Cadu	(Brazil) Confiança	Free transfer (Rescinded contract)	26 December 2025	Academy	
11	FW	(Paraguay) Ángel Romero	(Argentina) Boca Juniors	Free transfer (End of contract)	1 January 2026	First team	
26	DF	(Argentina) Fabrizio Angileri	Free agent	End of contract	1 January 2026	First team	
	DF	(Brazil) Fagner	(Brazil) Cruzeiro	Free transfer (Rescinded contract)	7 January 2026	First team	
	GK	(Brazil) Arthur Borghi	(Italy) Hellas Verona	Free transfer (Rescinded contract)	9 January 2026	Academy	
22	FW	(Spain) Héctor Hernández	(Portugal) Gil Vicente	Free transfer (Rescinded contract)	27 January 2026	First team	
	DF	(Paraguay) Fernando Vera	(Hungary) Zalaegerszegi TE	Free transfer (Rescinded contract)	10 February 2026	Academy	
	DF	(Brazil) Juninho	(Serbia) FK IMT	Free transfer (Rescinded contract)	10 February 2026	Academy	
	MF	(Brazil) Thomas Lisboa	(Estonia) Tartu JK Tammeka	Free transfer (Rescinded contract)	20 February 2026	Academy	
70	MF	(Venezuela) José Andrés Martínez	Free agent	Rescinded contract	24 February 2026	First team	
	DF	(Brazil) Guilherme Gama	(Brazil) Athletico Paranaense	Free transfer (Rescinded contract)	1 March 2026	Academy	
	FW	(Brazil) Rodrigão	(Brazil) Ceará	Free transfer (Rescinded contract)	11 June 2026	Academy	
	DF	(Brazil) Denner	(England) Chelsea	€10,000,000 (~R$62,400,000) (Note: On 29 January 2025, a sale agreement for €10 million (~R$62,400,000 at the time) was revealed, with Denner's departure after he turned 18.)	14 July 2026	Academy	
	MF	(Brazil) Yago Gonçalves	(Brazil) Camboriú	Free transfer (Rescinded contract)	17 July 2026	Academy	
10	FW	(Netherlands) Memphis Depay	Free agent	End of contract	1 August 2026	First team	

=== Loans out ===
#	Position	Player	Loaned to	Date	Loan expires	Team	Source
3	DF	(Ecuador) Félix Torres	(Brazil) Internacional	18 January 2026	31 December 2026	First team	
	DF	(Ecuador) Diego Palacios	(Ecuador) Universidad Católica	21 January 2026	31 December 2026	First team	
37	MF	(Brazil) Ryan	(Brazil) Fortaleza	21 January 2026	31 December 2026	First team	
32	GK	(Brazil) Matheus Donelli	(United Arab Emirates) Shabab Al Ahli	8 February 2026	31 December 2026	First team	
25	DF	(Brazil) Cacá	(Brazil) Vitória	26 February 2026	31 December 2026 (Note: Loan with an obligation to buy if Cacá plays a pre-stablished amount of minutes/matches and Vitória avoids relegation.)	First team	
	DF	(Brazil) Gabriel Caipira	(Brazil) Betim	4 March 2026	31 December 2026 (Cancelled on 21 July 2026)	Academy	
	FW	(Brazil) Favela	(Malta) Żabbar St Patrick	2 September 2026	30 June 2027	Academy	
	MF	(Brazil) Luiz Eduardo	(Brazil) Santos	11 September 2026	31 August 2027	Academy	
	MF	(Brazil) Lucas Molina	(Brazil) Avaí	16 September 2026	31 August 2027	Academy	

== Squad statistics ==
As of 18 November 2026

No.	Pos.	Name	Campeonato Brasileiro		Copa do Brasil		Supercopa do Brasil		Campeonato Paulista		Copa Libertadores		Total		Discipline	
No.	Pos.	Name	Apps	Goals	Apps	Goals	Apps	Goals	Apps	Goals	Apps	Goals	Apps	Goals	Yellow card	Red card
1	GK	(Brazil) Hugo Souza	31	0	3	0	1	0	9	0	10	0	54	0	3	0
2	DF	(Brazil) Matheuzinho	27 (2)	1	4	0	1	0	5 (3)	0	9	0	46 (5)	1	10	1
3	DF	(Brazil) Gabriel Paulista	23	1	3	0	1	1	4 (2)	0	10	0	41 (1)	2	9	0
4	DF	(Brazil) João Pedro	5 (2)	1	0	0	0	0	3	0	0 (1)	0	8 (3)	1	1	0
5	DF	(Brazil) André Ramalho	9 (2)	0	1	0	0 (1)	0	7	1	0 (1)	0	17 (4)	1	8	0
7	MF	(Brazil) Breno Bidon	29 (3)	2	3	0	1	0	6 (2)	1	9	1	48 (5)	4	14	0
8	MF	(Argentina) Rodrigo Garro	25 (6)	3	3	0	0 (1)	0	4 (2)	0	9 (1)	0	41 (10)	3	13	0
9	FW	(Brazil) Yuri Alberto	22 (1)	4	1 (1)	1	1	1	3 (4)	2	5 (1)	1	32 (7)	9	4	1
10	FW	(Netherlands) Memphis Depay	12 (4)	1	0	0	1	0	3 (1)	0	3 (1)	0	19 (6)	1	5	0
11	MF	(Brazil) Vitinho	6 (8)	0	0 (1)	0	0	0	5 (5)	1	0 (2)	0	11 (16)	1	2	0
13	DF	(Brazil) Gustavo Henrique	30	4	4	1	1	0	6	1	10	3	51	9	8	0
14	MF	(Brazil) Raniele	24 (2)	2	2 (1)	0	1	0	5 (2)	0	7	1	39 (5)	3	10	1
18	MF	(Brazil) Pedro Raul	4 (13)	1	2 (2)	1	0	0	1 (7)	0	3 (7)	0	10 (29)	2	2	0
19	MF	(Peru) André Carrillo	14 (11)	0	0 (2)	0	1	0	3 (2)	0	3 (6)	0	21 (21)	0	9	0
20	DF	(Uruguay) Pedro Milans	7 (2)	0	0	0	0	0	3	0	1	0	11 (2)	0	1	0
21	DF	(Brazil) Matheus Bidu	27 (2)	5	2 (1)	0	1	0	7 (2)	0	9	0	46 (5)	5	6	0
23	MF	(Brazil) Matheus Pereira	7 (14)	0	1 (2)	0	0 (1)	0	4 (1)	0	1 (1)	0	13 (19)	0	7	1
26	DF	(Argentina) Fabrizio Angileri	11 (4)	1	2	0	0	0	0	0	1	0	14 (4)	1	5	0
29	MF	(Brazil) Allan	12 (11)	0	2 (2)	0	0	0	3	0	5 (2)	0	22 (15)	0	9	2
31	FW	(Brazil) Kayke	2 (4)	0	1	0	0	0	1 (4)	1	2	1	6 (8)	2	0	0
35	MF	(Brazil) Charles	4 (5)	0	0	0	0 (1)	0	5 (1)	0	0 (2)	0	9 (9)	0	2	0
37	FW	(Brazil) Kaio César	14 (8)	6	2 (2)	0	0 (1)	0	1	0	5 (3)	1	22 (14)	7	6	0
40	GK	(Brazil) Felipe Longo	0	0	0	0	0	0	1	0	0	0	1	0	0	0
46	DF	(Brazil) Hugo	0	0	0	0	0	0	3	0	0	0	3	0	0	0
48	MF	(Brazil) Guilherme Amorim	0	0	0	0	0	0	0	0	0	0	0	0	0	0
49	MF	(Brazil) André	18 (6)	4	3	0	1	0	8	2	5 (1)	0	35 (7)	6	5	2
51	GK	(Brazil) Kauê	4	0	1	0	0	0	0	0	0	0	5	0	2	0
52	MF	(Morocco) Zakaria Labyad	2 (9)	1	0 (2)	0	0	0	0	0	1 (3)	1	3 (14)	2	1	0
54	MF	(Brazil) Luiz Gustavo	0	0	0	0	0	0	1	0	0	0	1	0	1	0
55	DF	(Brazil) Iago Machado	2	0	0	0	0	0	0	0	0	0	2	0	0	0
56	FW	(Brazil) Gui Negão	2 (12)	1	1	0	0	0	6 (1)	1	0 (1)	0	9 (14)	2	3	0
59	DF	(Brazil) João Vitor	0	0	0	0	0	0	0 (1)	0	0	0	0 (1)	0	0	0
61	MF	(Brazil) Dieguinho	4 (15)	1	1 (2)	0	0	0	1 (6)	1	0 (2)	0	6 (25)	2	0	0
64	FW	(Brazil) Luizinho	0	0	0	0	0	0	0	0	0	0	0	0	0	0
67	FW	(Brazil) Nícollas	0	0	0	0	0	0	0	0	0	0	0	0	0	0
77	MF	(England) Jesse Lingard	8 (12)	0	2 (2)	1	0	0	0	0	2 (6)	1	12 (20)	2	5	0
80	MF	(Brazil) Alex Santana	0 (2)	0	0	0	0	0	0	0	0	0	0 (2)	0	0	0
81	GK	(Brazil) Pietro	0	0	0	0	0	0	0	0	0	0	0	0	0	0
84	DF	(Brazil) Yago Melo	0	0	0	0	0	0	0	0	0	0	0	0	0	0
Players transferred out during the season
25	DF	(Brazil) Cacá	0	0	0	0	0	0	1	0	0	0	1	0	1	0
32	GK	(Brazil) Matheus Donelli	0	0	0	0	0	0	0	0	0	0	0	0	0	0
37	MF	(Brazil) Ryan	0	0	0	0	0	0	0 (1)	0	0	0	0 (1)	0	0	0
70	MF	(Venezuela) José Andrés Martínez	0	0	0	0	0	0	0	0	0	0	0	0	0	0

=== Goals ===
As of 18 November 2026

Rank	Player	BR	CB	SB	CP	CL	Total
1	(Brazil) Gustavo Henrique	4	1	0	1	3	9
1	(Brazil) Yuri Alberto	4	1	1	2	1	9
3	(Brazil) Kaio César	6	0	0	0	1	7
4	(Brazil) André	4	0	0	2	0	6
5	(Brazil) Matheus Bidu	5	0	0	0	0	5
6	(Brazil) Breno Bidon	2	0	0	1	1	4
7	(Argentina) Rodrigo Garro	3	0	0	0	0	3
7	(Brazil) Raniele	2	0	0	0	1	3
9	(Brazil) Dieguinho	1	0	0	1	0	2
9	(Brazil) Gabriel Paulista	1	0	1	0	0	2
9	(Brazil) Gui Negão	1	0	0	1	0	2
9	(Brazil) Kayke	0	0	0	1	1	2
9	(Morocco) Zakaria Labyad	1	0	0	0	1	2
9	(England) Jesse Lingard	0	1	0	0	1	2
9	(Brazil) Pedro Raul	1	1	0	0	0	2
16	(Brazil) André Ramalho	0	0	0	1	0	1
16	(Argentina) Fabrizio Angileri	1	0	0	0	0	1
16	(Netherlands) Memphis Depay	1	0	0	0	0	1
16	(Brazil) João Pedro	1	0	0	0	0	1
16	(Brazil) Matheuzinho	1	0	0	0	0	1
16	(Brazil) Vitinho	0	0	0	1	0	1
Own goals		1	0	0	0	0	1
Total		40	4	2	11	10	67

=== Assists ===
As of 18 November 2026

Rank	Player	BR	CB	SB	CP	CL	Total
1	(Argentina) Rodrigo Garro	7	1	0	0	5	13
2	(Brazil) Matheuzinho	3	0	0	1	1	5
2	(Brazil) Vitinho	4	0	0	1	0	5
4	(Brazil) Yuri Alberto	2	0	0	1	1	4
5	(Netherlands) Memphis Depay	1	0	0	1	1	3
5	(Brazil) Gustavo Henrique	1	0	1	0	1	3
5	(Brazil) Kaio César	2	0	1	0	0	3
5	(Brazil) Matheus Bidu	1	1	0	1	0	3
9	(Brazil) André	2	0	0	0	0	2
9	(Brazil) Breno Bidon	2	0	0	0	0	2
9	(Morocco) Zakaria Labyad	2	0	0	0	0	2
9	(Brazil) Pedro Raul	0	1	0	1	0	2
13	(Brazil) Allan	1	0	0	0	0	1
13	(Argentina) Fabrizio Angileri	1	0	0	0	0	1
13	(Peru) André Carrillo	1	0	0	0	0	1
13	(Brazil) Dieguinho	0	0	0	1	0	1
13	(England) Jesse Lingard	1	0	0	0	0	1
13	(Brazil) Ryan	0	0	0	1	0	1
Total		31	3	2	8	9	53

=== Disciplinary record ===
As of 18 November 2026

N	P	Nat.	Name	BR			CB			SB			CP			CL			Total			Notes
N	P	Nat.	Name	Yellow card	Second yellow card	Red card	Yellow card	Second yellow card	Red card	Yellow card	Second yellow card	Red card	Yellow card	Second yellow card	Red card	Yellow card	Second yellow card	Red card	Yellow card	Second yellow card	Red card	Notes
49	MF	(Brazil)	André	2		2							3			1			6		2	
29	MF	(Brazil)	Allan	4		1							2			2	1		8	1	1	
2	DF	(Brazil)	Matheuzinho	6		1	1						1			2			10		1	
14	MF	(Brazil)	Raniele	8			1									1		1	10		1	
23	MF	(Brazil)	Matheus Pereira	2		1	1			1			3						7		1	
9	FW	(Brazil)	Yuri Alberto	2		1							2						4		1	
7	MF	(Brazil)	Breno Bidon	5			1			1			4			3			14			
8	MF	(Argentina)	Rodrigo Garro	11			1									1			13			
19	MF	(Peru)	André Carrillo	6			1						2						9			
3	DF	(Brazil)	Gabriel Paulista	7						1						1			9			
5	DF	(Brazil)	André Ramalho	6			1						1						8			
13	DF	(Brazil)	Gustavo Henrique	4			1						2			1			8			
37	FW	(Brazil)	Kaio César	4			1									1			6			
21	DF	(Brazil)	Matheus Bidu	5									1						6			
26	DF	(Argentina)	Fabrizio Angileri	4												1			5			
10	FW	(Netherlands)	Memphis Depay	4						1									5			
77	MF	(England)	Jesse Lingard	3			2												5			
56	FW	(Brazil)	Gui Negão	1									2						3			
1	GK	(Brazil)	Hugo Souza	3															3			
35	MF	(Brazil)	Charles	1									1						2			
51	GK	(Brazil)	Kauê	2															2			
18	FW	(Brazil)	Pedro Raul	1			1												2			
11	MF	(Brazil)	Vitinho	1									1						2			
25	DF	(Brazil)	Cacá										1						1			
4	DF	(Brazil)	João Pedro	1															1			
52	MF	(Morocco)	Zakaria Labyad	1															1			
54	MF	(Brazil)	Luiz Gustavo										1						1			
20	DF	(Uruguay)	Pedro Milans	1															1			

Only competitive matches
Ordered by (red card) , (second yellow card) and (yellow card)
(yellow card) = Number of bookings; (second yellow card) = Number of sending offs after a second yellow card; (red card) = Number of sending offs by a direct red card.

== Friendlies ==
12 July 2026 Friendly	Cascavel	1–1	Corinthians	Cascavel
16:00 UTC−3	Cleiton 70'	Report	Matheus Pereira 60'	Stadium: Estádio Municipal Arnaldo Busato; Attendance: Undisclosed; Referee: Murilo Ugolini Klein

== Competitions ==
=== Overall record ===
Competition	First match	Last match	Starting round	Final position	Record							
Competition	First match	Last match	Starting round	Final position	Pld	W	D	L	GF	GA	GD	Win %
Série A	28 January 2026	2 December 2026	Matchday 1	TBD	35	10	10	15	40	42	−2	28.57
Copa do Brasil	21 April 2026	6 August 2026	Fifth round	Round of 16	4	3	0	1	4	3	+1	75.00
Supercopa do Brasil	1 February 2026		Final	Winners	1	1	0	0	2	0	+2	100.00
Campeonato Paulista	11 January 2026	28 February 2026	League phase	Semi-finals	10	4	3	3	11	8	+3	40.00
Copa Libertadores	9 April 2026	16 September 2026	Group stage	Quarter-finals	10	4	4	2	10	6	+4	40.00
Total					60	22	17	21	67	59	+8	36.67

Last updated: 18 November 2026
Source: Competitions

=== Campeonato Brasileiro ===
==== League table ====
Pos	Team	Pld	W	D	L	GF	GA	GD	Pts	Qualification or relegation
14	Vitória	35	11	8	16	37	52	−15	41	
15	Mirassol	35	10	11	14	39	48	−9	41	
16	Corinthians	35	10	10	15	40	42	−2	40	
17	Internacional	35	9	11	15	39	44	−5	38	Relegation to Campeonato Brasileiro Série B
18	Grêmio (Note: Grêmio qualified for the Copa Libertadores group stage as 2026 Copa do Brasil champions or runners-up. If they are relegated, their berth will be passed to the Série A's highest-placed team not already qualified.)	35	9	11	15	38	47	−9	38	Relegation to Campeonato Brasileiro Série B

Updated to match(es) played on 19 November 2026. Source: CBF
Rules for classification: 1) points; 2) wins; 3) goal difference; 4) goals scored; 5) head-to-head results (only between two teams); 6) fewest red cards; 7) fewest yellow cards; 8) drawing of lots.

==== Results summary ====
Overall								Home						Away					
Pld	W	D	L	GF	GA	GD	Pts	W	D	L	GF	GA	GD	W	D	L	GF	GA	GD
35	10	10	15	40	42	−2	40	7	4	7	22	17	+5	3	6	8	18	25	−7

Last updated: 18 November 2026.
Source: CBF

==== Result by round ====
Round	1	3	2^{1}	4	5	6	7	8	9	10	11	12	13	14	15	16	17	18	19	20	21	22	23	24	25	26	27	28	29	30	31	32	33	34	35	36	37	38
Ground	H	H	A	A	H	A	A	H	A	H	H	A	H	A	H	A	H	A	H	A	H	A	H	A	H	H	A	H	A	A	H	A	H	A	H	A	H	A
Result	L	W	W	D	L	D	D	D	L	L	D	D	W	L	W	L	W	W	W	D	D	W	L	L	L	L	L	L	L	L	D	L	W	D	W			
Position	14	12	5	3	10	8	9	11	14	16	16	17	14	17	16	17	15	10	7	9	9	7	9	10	10	12	13	14	16	16	16	18	17	17	16			
Points	0	3	6	7	7	8	9	10	10	10	11	12	15	15	18	18	21	24	27	28	29	32	32	32	32	32	32	32	32	32	33	33	36	37	40			

Updated to match(es) played on 19 November. Source: CBF
A = Away; H = Home; W = Win; D = Draw; L = Loss; P = Postponed
Notes:
- ^{1} Matchday 2 (vs. Athletico Paranaense) was postponed for table adjustments in the Campeonato Paulista due to Corinthians participation in the 2026 Supercopa do Brasil.

==== Matches ====
28 January 2026 1	Corinthians	1–2	Bahia	Santos
20:00 UTC−3	Bidon 12'	Report	Jean Lucas 32'; Willian José 45+1' (pen.)	Stadium: Vila Belmiro (Note: After the date change, Corinthians had to play their home match at Vila Belmiro, Santos instead of their regular stadium Neo Química Arena, São Paulo, as there was another scheduled match for 28 January in the city of São Paulo and the Military Police of São Paulo State does not allow matches in the city on the same day from two major teams of the state.); Attendance: 13,788; Referee: Anderson Daronco
Note: The match was originally scheduled for 29 January, but it was anticipated as Corinthians required to have the same amount of resting days as Flamengo before the 2026 Supercopa do Brasil.

12 February 2026 3	Corinthians	2–0	Red Bull Bragantino	São Paulo
20:00 UTC−3	Gabriel Paulista 47'; Matheus Bidu 74'	Report		Stadium: Neo Química Arena; Attendance: 26,985; Referee: Felipe Fernandes de Lima

19 February 2026 2	Athletico Paranaense	0–1	Corinthians	Curitiba
19:30 UTC−3		Report	Garro 20'	Stadium: Arena da Baixada; Attendance: 16,804; Referee: Rodrigo José Pereira de Lima
Note: The match was originally scheduled for 4–5 February, but it was postponed to 18 February for table adjustments in the Campeonato Paulista due to Corinthians participation in the 2026 Supercopa do Brasil. It was then postponed again due to the limited police force on the date originally scheduled for the match.

25 February 2026 4	Cruzeiro	1–1	Corinthians	Belo Horizonte
20:00 UTC−3	Matheus Pereira 9'	Report	João Pedro 81'	Stadium: Mineirão; Attendance: 20,267; Referee: Davi de Oliveira Lacerda

11 March 2026 5	Corinthians	0–2	Coritiba	São Paulo
21:30 UTC−3		Report	Jacy 37'; Lucas Ronier 53'	Stadium: Neo Química Arena; Attendance: 35,125; Referee: Paulo Cesar Zanovelli

15 March 2026 6	Santos	1–1	Corinthians	Santos
16:00 UTC−3	Gabriel 21'	Report	Depay 18'	Stadium: Vila Belmiro; Attendance: 15,008; Referee: Flávio Rodrigues de Souza

19 March 2026 7	Chapecoense	0–0	Corinthians	Chapecó
21:30 UTC−3		Report		Stadium: Arena Condá; Attendance: 18,031; Referee: Wilton Pereira Sampaio

22 March 2026 8	Corinthians	1–1	Flamengo	São Paulo
20:30 UTC−3	Yuri Alberto 19'	Report	Paquetá 3'	Stadium: Neo Química Arena; Attendance: 41,896; Referee: Rodrigo José Pereira de Lima

1 April 2026 9	Fluminense	3–1	Corinthians	Rio de Janeiro
21:30 UTC−3	John Kennedy 20'; Hércules 45+3'; Castillo 83'	Report	André 89'	Stadium: Maracanã; Attendance: 24,701; Referee: Davi de Oliveira Lacerda

5 April 2026 10	Corinthians	0–1	Internacional	São Paulo
19:30 UTC−3		Report	Bernabei 78'	Stadium: Neo Química Arena; Attendance: 32,437; Referee: Felipe Fernandes de Lima

12 April 2026 11	Corinthians	0–0	Palmeiras	São Paulo
18:30 UTC−3		Report		Stadium: Neo Química Arena; Attendance: 46,466; Referee: Flávio Rodrigues de Souza

18 April 2026 12	Vitória	0–0	Corinthians	Salvador
20:00 UTC−3		Report		Stadium: Barradão; Attendance: 21,991; Referee: Alex Gomes Stefano

26 April 2026 13	Corinthians	1–0	Vasco da Gama	São Paulo
16:00 UTC−3	Matheus Bidu 38'	Report		Stadium: Neo Química Arena; Attendance: 42,352; Referee: Davi de Oliveira Lacerda

3 May 2026 14	Mirassol	2–1	Corinthians	Mirassol
20:30 UTC−3	Carlos Eduardo 23' (pen.), 33'	Report	Dieguinho 80'	Stadium: Estádio José Maria de Campos Maia; Attendance: 9,943; Referee: Matheus Delgado Candançan

10 May 2026 15	Corinthians	3–2	São Paulo	São Paulo
18:30 UTC−3	Raniele 17'; Matheuzinho 52'; Bidon 57'	Report	Luciano 41'; Matheuzinho 89' (o.g.)	Stadium: Neo Química Arena; Attendance: 37,791; Referee: Anderson Daronco
Note: Corinthians played this match with the lower west stand behind closed doors due to an isolated racist incident with a supporter that took place in that section during the match against Palmeiras on 12 April.

17 May 2026 16	Botafogo	3–1	Corinthians	Rio de Janeiro
16:00 UTC−3	Arthur Cabral 7', 32', 70'	Report	Garro 11'	Stadium: Estádio Olímpico Nilton Santos; Attendance: 17,556; Referee: Felipe Fernandes de Lima

24 May 2026 17	Corinthians	1–0	Atlético Mineiro	São Paulo
18:30 UTC−3	Labyad 88'	Report		Stadium: Neo Química Arena; Attendance: 42,920; Referee: Rafael Klein

30 May 2026 18	Grêmio	1–3	Corinthians	Porto Alegre
17:30 UTC−3	Gabriel Mec 7'	Report	André 45+2', 65'; Kaio César 67'	Stadium: Arena do Grêmio; Attendance: 42,359; Referee: Lucas Paulo Torezin

23 July 2026 19	Corinthians	3–0	Remo	São Paulo
19:30 UTC−3	Yuri Alberto 26', 45+2'; Kaio César 40'	Report		Stadium: Neo Química Arena; Attendance: 43,970; Referee: Lucas Casagrande

26 July 2026 20	Bahia	1–1	Corinthians	Salvador
16:00 UTC−3	David Duarte 45+4'	Report	Angileri 8'	Stadium: Casa de Apostas Arena Fonte Nova; Attendance: 44,576; Referee: Ramon Abatti Abel

30 July 2026 21	Corinthians	0–0	Athletico Paranaense	São Paulo
19:30 UTC−3		Report		Stadium: Neo Química Arena; Attendance: 39,327; Referee: Paulo Cesar Zanovelli

9 August 2026 22	Red Bull Bragantino	0–2	Corinthians	Bragança Paulista
18:30 UTC−3		Report	Garro 59'; Pedro Raul 87'	Stadium: Estádio Cícero de Souza Marques; Attendance: 6,912; Referee: Raphael Claus

16 August 2026 23	Corinthians	1–2	Cruzeiro	São Paulo
19:30 UTC−3	Gustavo Henrique 58'	Report	Bruno Rodrigues 36'; Wanderson 82'	Stadium: Neo Química Arena; Attendance: 38,261; Referee: Davi de Oliveira Lacerda

23 August 2026 24	Coritiba	2–1	Corinthians	Curitiba
19:30 UTC−3	Pedro Rocha 40'; Paulo Roberto 75'	Report	Raniele 90+3'	Stadium: Estádio Couto Pereira; Attendance: 32,798; Referee: Anderson Daronco

30 August 2026 25	Corinthians	0–1	Santos	São Paulo
16:00 UTC−3		Report	Oliva 33'	Stadium: Neo Química Arena; Attendance: 47,496; Referee: Wilton Pereira Sampaio

6 September 2026 26	Corinthians	1–2	Chapecoense	São Paulo
19:30 UTC−3	Matheus Bidu 2'	Report	Marcinho 40', 77'	Stadium: Neo Química Arena; Attendance: 44,588; Referee: Wagner do Nascimento Magalhães

13 September 2026 27	Flamengo	2–1	Corinthians	Rio de Janeiro
17:30 UTC−3	Paquetá 48'; Bruno Henrique 89'	Report	Gui Negão 78'	Stadium: Maracanã; Attendance: 70,112; Referee: Wilton Pereira Sampaio

20 September 2026 28	Corinthians	1–3	Fluminense	São Paulo
16:00 UTC−3	Gustavo Henrique 56'	Report	Hulk 24', 76'; Serna 90+3'	Stadium: Neo Química Arena; Attendance: 38,686; Referee: Ramon Abatti Abel

7 October 2026 29	Internacional	2–1	Corinthians	Porto Alegre
19:30 UTC−3	Vitinho 1'; Alan Patrick 77'	Report	André 80'	Stadium: Estádio Beira-Rio; Attendance: 27,566; Referee: Felipe Fernandes de Lima

11 October 2026 30	Palmeiras	4–1	Corinthians	São Paulo
17:30 UTC−3	Barboza 16'; Giay 45+1', 52'; Matheus Bidu 46' (o.g.)	Report	Gustavo Henrique 90+1'	Stadium: Nubank Parque; Attendance: 30,112; Referee: Anderson Daronco
Note: The match took place with a reduced capacity due to scheduled shows at the venue in the days surrounding the match.

19 October 2026 31	Corinthians	1–1	Vitória	São Paulo
20:00 UTC−3	Renê 45+1'	Report	Yuri Alberto 66' (pen.)	Stadium: Neo Química Arena; Attendance: 41,137; Referee: Sávio Pereira Sampaio

24 October 2026 32	Vasco da Gama	3–2	Corinthians	Rio de Janeiro
18:30 UTC−3	Rodríguez 35'; Hinestroza 88', 90'	Report	Gustavo Henrique 50'; Matheus Bidu 57'	Stadium: Estádio São Januário; Attendance: 19,048; Referee: Wilton Pereira Sampaio

30 October 2026 33	Corinthians	2–0	Mirassol	São Paulo
20:00 UTC−3	Matheus Bidu 58'; Kaio César 80'	Report		Stadium: Neo Química Arena; Attendance: 44,151; Referee: Matheus Delgado Candançan

4 November 2026 34	São Paulo	0–0	Corinthians	Santos
21:30 UTC−3		Report		Stadium: Vila Belmiro (Note: São Paulo played their home match at Vila Belmiro, Santos, instead of their regular stadium MorumBIS, São Paulo, which was unavaible after hosting a series of BTS shows.); Attendance: 12,786; Referee: Raphael Claus

18 November 2026 35	Corinthians	4–0	Botafogo	São Paulo
21:30 UTC−3	Kaio César 28', 60', 67'; Arthur Chaves 34' (o.g.)	Report		Stadium: Neo Química Arena; Attendance: 43,576; Referee: Wilton Pereira Sampaio

25 November 2026 36	Atlético Mineiro	v	Corinthians	Belo Horizonte
20:00 UTC−3				Stadium: Arena MRV

29 November 2026 37	Corinthians	v	Grêmio	São Paulo
18:30 UTC−3				Stadium: Neo Química Arena

2 December 2026 38	Remo	v	Corinthians	Belém
21:30 UTC−3				Stadium: Mangueirão

=== Copa do Brasil ===
==== Preliminary stages ====
21 April 2026 Fifth round	Barra	0–1	Corinthians	Florianópolis
21:30 UTC−3		Report	Lingard 45+2'	Stadium: Estádio da Ressacada (Note: Barra played their home match at Estádio da Ressacada, Florianópolis instead of their regular stadium Arena Barra FC, Itajaí, which did not meet CBF requirements.); Attendance: 14,137; Referee: Rafael Klein

14 May 2026 Fifth round	Corinthians	1–0 (2–0 agg.)	Barra	São Paulo
19:30 UTC−3	Yuri Alberto 84'	Report		Stadium: Neo Química Arena; Attendance: 32,704; Referee: Marcelo de Lima Henrique

==== Knockout stages ====
2 August 2026 Round of 16	Internacional	2–0	Corinthians	Porto Alegre
19:30 UTC−3	Matheus Bahia 61'; Alan Patrick 67' (pen.)	Report		Stadium: Estádio Beira-Rio; Attendance: 30,864; Referee: Alex Gomes Stefano

6 August 2026 Round of 16	Corinthians	2–1 (2–3 agg.)	Internacional	São Paulo
20:00 UTC−3	Gustavo Henrique 43'; Pedro Raul 70'	Report	Bernabei 59'	Stadium: Neo Química Arena; Attendance: 45,126; Referee: Felipe Fernandes de Lima

=== Supercopa do Brasil ===
1 February 2026 Final	Flamengo	0–2	Corinthians	Brasília
16:00 UTC+3		Report	Gabriel Paulista 26'; Yuri Alberto 90+7'	Stadium: Arena BRB Mané Garrincha; Attendance: 71,244; Referee: Rafael Klein
Note: The match was originally scheduled for 24 January at a venue TBD, but it was rescheduled for this date and Brasília confirmed as the location.

=== Campeonato Paulista ===
==== League phase ====
The 2026 Campeonato Paulista was the first edition to feature the single-league format, which replaced the group format used until the previous season. The 16 teams were divided in four pots of 4 teams (Corinthians was in pot A). Each team played eight matches, four at home and four away, against eight different opponents (all teams in pot A faced each other, then two teams of pot B and C each, and then one team from pot D), with all 16 teams ranked in a single league table. The top eight teams qualified for the quarterfinals. The two overall worst teams were relegated.

===== League phase table =====
Pos	Team	Pld	W	D	L	GF	GA	GD	Pts	Qualification
3	Red Bull Bragantino	8	4	4	0	14	2	+12	16	Qualification for the Quarter-finals
4	Portuguesa	8	5	0	3	11	7	+4	15	Qualification for the Quarter-finals
5	Corinthians	8	4	2	2	10	6	+4	14	Qualification for the Quarter-finals
6	São Paulo	8	4	1	3	11	12	−1	13	Qualification for the Quarter-finals
7	Capivariano	8	4	1	3	7	10	−3	13	Qualification for the Quarter-finals

Source: FPF
Rules for classification: 1) points; 2) wins; 3) goal difference; 4) goals scored; 5) head-to-head results (only between 2 teams); 6) fewest red cards; 7) fewest yellow cards; 8) draw.

===== Results summary =====
Overall								Home						Away					
Pld	W	D	L	GF	GA	GD	Pts	W	D	L	GF	GA	GD	W	D	L	GF	GA	GD
8	4	2	2	10	6	+4	14	2	1	1	7	2	+5	2	1	1	3	4	−1

Source: Soccerway

===== Result by round =====
Round	1	2	3	4	5	6	7	8
Ground	H	A	H	A	A	H	H	A
Result	W	L	D	D	W	W	L	W
Position	2	8	7	7	4	4	5	5
Points	3	3	4	5	8	11	11	14

Source: Soccerway
A = Away; H = Home; W = Win; D = Draw; L = Loss; P = Postponed

===== Matches =====
11 January 2026 1	Corinthians	3–0	Ponte Preta	São Paulo
16:00 UTC−3	Gustavo Henrique 54'; André 63'; André Ramalho 90+4'	Report		Stadium: Neo Química Arena; Attendance: 37,089; Referee: Daiane Muniz
Note: Corinthians was expected to play this match behind closed doors due to the supporters use of pyro during their home match in the 2025 finals against Palmeiras on 27 March 2025. However, the suspension was overturned in early January. The STJD tried to reinstate the punishment on 9 January, but settled for a fine.

15 January 2026 2	Red Bull Bragantino	3–0	Corinthians	Bragança Paulista
19:30 UTC−3	Jhon Jhon 35', 57'; Mosquera 77'	Report		Stadium: Estádio Cícero de Souza Marques; Attendance: 6,758; Referee: Flávio Rodrigues de Souza

18 January 2026 3	Corinthians	1–1	São Paulo	São Paulo
16:00 UTC−3	Bidon 90'	Report	Tapia 37'	Stadium: Neo Química Arena; Attendance: 44,769; Referee: João Vitor Gobi
Note: Corinthians was expected to play this match with the north stand behind closed doors due to the supporters use of flares during their home match in the 2025 finals against Palmeiras on 27 March 2025. However, the suspension was overturned in early January. The STJD tried to reinstate the punishment on 9 January, but settled for a fine.

22 January 2026 4	Santos	1–1	Corinthians	Santos
19:30 UTC−3	Gabriel 90+4'	Report	Yuri Alberto 16'	Stadium: Vila Belmiro; Attendance: 8,588; Referee: Lucas Canetto Bellote

25 January 2026 5	Velo Clube	0–1	Corinthians	Rio Claro
20:30 UTC−3		Report	Yuri Alberto 90+1'	Stadium: Estádio Benito Agnelo Castellano; Attendance: 7,126; Referee: Flávio Rodrigues de Souza

5 February 2026 6	Corinthians	3–0	Capivariano	São Paulo
20:30 UTC−3	Dieguinho 54'; Gui Negão 65'; Kayke 80'	Report		Stadium: Neo Química Arena; Attendance: 28,885; Referee: Daiane Muniz
Note: The match was originally scheduled for 31 January, but it was postponed due to Corinthians' participation in the 2026 Supercopa do Brasil a day later.

8 February 2026 7	Corinthians	0–1	Palmeiras	São Paulo
20:30 UTC−3		Report	López 84'	Stadium: Neo Química Arena; Attendance: 45,660; Referee: Raphael Claus

15 February 2026 8	São Bernardo	0–1	Corinthians	São Bernardo do Campo
20:30 UTC−3		Report	André 67'	Stadium: Estádio 1º de Maio; Attendance: 7,666; Referee: Flávio Rodrigues de Souza

==== Knockout stages ====
22 February 2026 Quarter-finals	Portuguesa	1–1 (7–8 p)	Corinthians	São Paulo
20:30 UTC−3	Zé Vitor 37'	Report	Vitinho 90+3'	Stadium: Estádio do Canindé; Attendance: 12,784; Referee: Raphael Claus
	Penalties
	Zé Vitor (penalty scored); Renê (penalty missed); Botteghin (penalty scored); Gustavo Henrique (penalty scored); Everton Maceió (penalty scored); Hudson (penalty scored); Gustavo Salomão (penalty scored); Carlos Lima (penalty scored); Cauari (penalty missed)		(penalty missed) Garro; (penalty scored) Vitinho; (penalty scored) Matheuzinho; (penalty scored) Gustavo Henrique; (penalty scored) Pedro Raul; (penalty scored) Ramalho; (penalty scored) Kayke; (penalty scored) André; (penalty scored) Allan

28 February 2026 Semi-finals	Novorizontino	1–0	Corinthians	Novo Horizonte
20:30 UTC−3	Mayk 74'	Report		Stadium: Estádio Doutor Jorge Ismael de Biasi; Attendance: 10,899; Referee: João Vitor Gobi

=== Copa Libertadores ===
==== Group stage ====
Pos	Team	Pld	W	D	L	GF	GA	GD	Pts	Qualification	COR	PLA	SFE	PEÑ
1	(Brazil) Corinthians	6	3	2	1	8	4	+4	11	Advance to round of 16	—	0–2	2–0	2–0
2	(Argentina) Platense	6	3	1	2	8	7	+1	10	Advance to round of 16	0–2	—	2–1	1–1
3	(Colombia) Santa Fe	6	2	2	2	6	7	−1	8	Transfer to Copa Sudamericana	1–1	2–1	—	1–1
4	(Uruguay) Peñarol	6	0	3	3	4	8	−4	3		1–1	1–2	0–1	—

Source: CONMEBOL
Rules for classification: 1) Points; 2) Head-to-head points; 3) Head-to-head goal difference; 4) Head-to-head goals scored; 5) Goal difference; 6) Goals scored; 7) Red cards; 8) Yellow cards; 9) Drawing of lots.

9 April 2026 1	Platense (Argentina)	0–2	(Brazil) Corinthians	Florida, Argentina
21:00 UTC−3		Report	Kayke 53'; Yuri Alberto 70'	Stadium: Estadio Ciudad de Vicente López; Attendance: Undisclosed; Referee: Piero Maza (Chile)

15 April 2026 2	Corinthians (Brazil)	2–0	(Colombia) Santa Fe	São Paulo, Brazil
21:30 UTC−3	Raniele 51'; Gustavo Henrique 80'	Report		Stadium: Neo Química Arena; Attendance: 39,371; Referee: Juan Gabriel Benítez (Paraguay)

30 April 2026 3	Corinthians (Brazil)	2–0	(Uruguay) Peñarol	São Paulo, Brazil
21:00 UTC−3	Gustavo Henrique 11'; Lingard 25'	Report		Stadium: Neo Química Arena; Attendance: 43,770; Referee: Cristián Garay (Chile)

6 May 2026 4	Santa Fe (Colombia)	1–1	(Brazil) Corinthians	Bogotá, Colombia
19:30 UTC−5	Rodallega 59'	Report	Gustavo Henrique 90+3'	Stadium: Estadio El Campín; Attendance: Undisclosed; Referee: Kevin Ortega (Peru)

21 May 2026 5	Peñarol (Uruguay)	1–1	(Brazil) Corinthians	Montevideo, Uruguay
21:30 UTC−3	Olivera 19'	Report	Labyad 63'	Stadium: Estadio Campeón del Siglo; Attendance: Undisclosed; Referee: Piero Maza (Chile)

27 May 2026 6	Corinthians (Brazil)	0–2	(Argentina) Platense	São Paulo, Brazil
21:30 UTC−3		Report	Zapiola 21' (pen.), 57'	Stadium: Neo Química Arena; Attendance: 39,996; Referee: Alexis Herrera (Venezuela)

==== Knockout stages ====
13 August 2026 Round of 16	Rosario Central (Argentina)	0–0	(Brazil) Corinthians	Rosario, Argentina
21:30 UTC−3		Report		Stadium: Estadio Gigante de Arroyito; Attendance: Undisclosed; Referee: Andrés Matonte (Uruguay)

20 August 2026 Round of 16	Corinthians (Brazil)	1–0 (1–0 agg.)	(Argentina) Rosario Central	São Paulo, Brazil
21:30 UTC−3	Bidon 80'	Report		Stadium: Neo Química Arena; Attendance: 46,935; Referee: Alexis Herrera (Venezuela)

9 September 2026 Quarter-finals	Estudiantes (Argentina)	1–1	(Brazil) Corinthians	La Plata, Argentina
21:30 UTC−3	Castro 4'	Report	Kaio César 49'	Stadium: Estadio Jorge Luis Hirschi; Attendance: Undisclosed; Referee: Esteban Ostojich (Uruguay)

16 September 2026 Quarter-finals	Corinthians (Brazil)	0–1 (1–2 agg.)	(Argentina) Estudiantes	São Paulo, Brazil
21:30 UTC−3		Report	Castro 87'	Stadium: Neo Química Arena; Attendance: 47,549; Referee: Jesús Valenzuela (Venezuela)

== See also ==
- List of SC Corinthians Paulista seasons
