= Kauê (footballer, born February 2004) =

Brazilian footballer (born 2007)

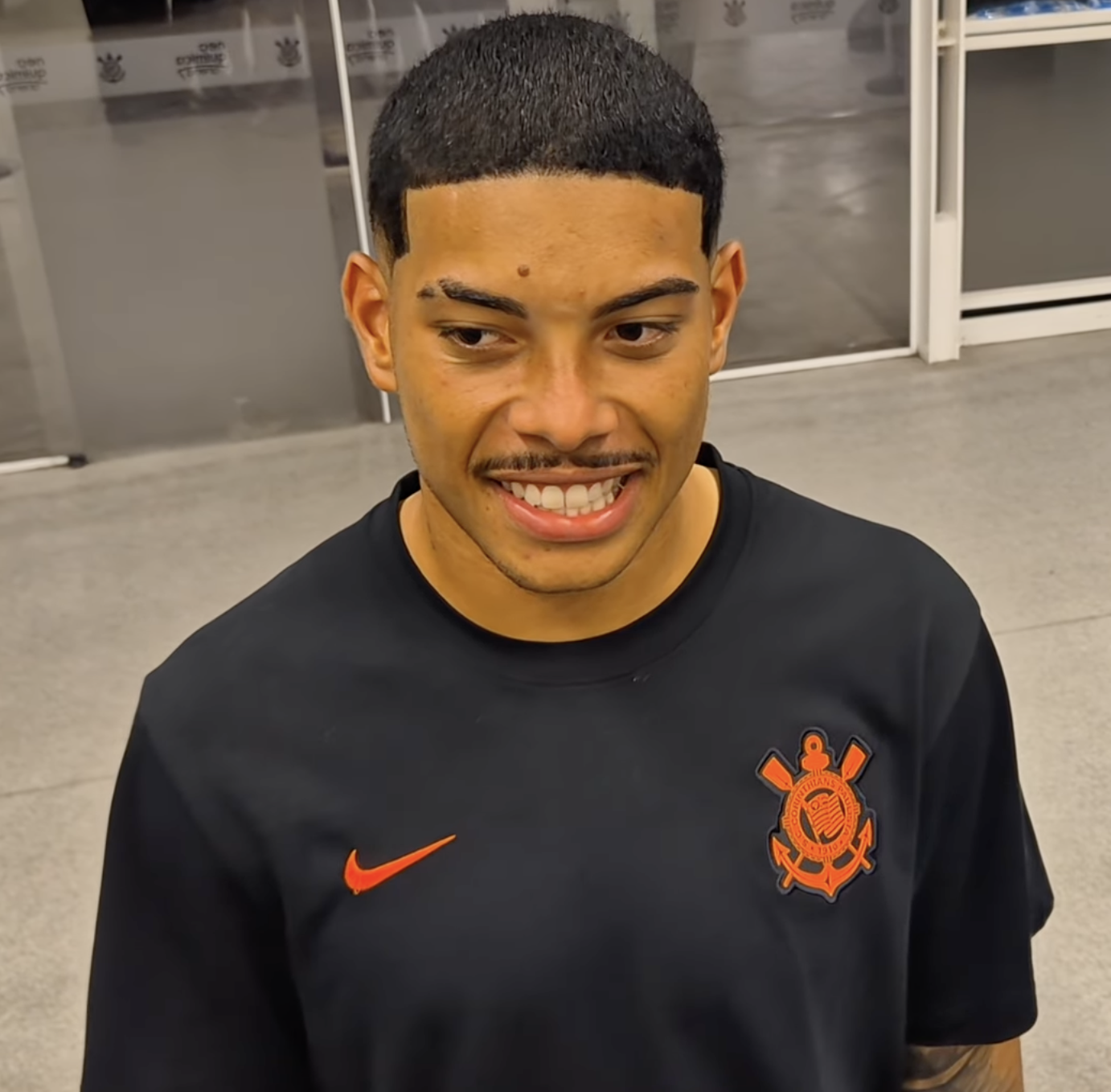

Personal information
- Full name: Kauê Vinicius de Souza Camargo
- Date of birth: 8 February 2004 (age 22)
- Place of birth: Santa Cruz do Rio Pardo, Brazil
- Height: 1.92 m (6 ft 4 in)
- Position: Goalkeeper

Team information
- Current team: Corinthians
- Number: 51

Youth career
- 2022–2025: Corinthians

Senior career*
Years	Team	Apps	(Gls)
2025–	Corinthians	5	(0)

International career
2024	Brazil U17	0	(0)
- * Club domestic league appearances and goals as of 09:38, 6 September 2026 (BRT)

Kauê Vinicius de Souza Camargo (born 8 February 2004), known as Kauê, is a Brazilian footballer who plays as a goalkeeper for Corinthians.

== Club career ==
Born in Santa Cruz do Rio Pardo São Paulo, Kauê joined Corinthians' youth categories at the age of fifteen. He joined Corinthians as a reinforcement for the U-15 team. After a good 2019, the goalkeeper was promoted to the U-17 team in 2020. In 2021, changes in the U-20 team led to Kauê's promotion. He was a standout in the second leg of the 2021 São Paulo State U-17 Championship finals. Corinthians beat Palmeiras 2-0 and won the title on penalties, with Kauê saving two shots. The final penalty secured the title for Corinthians. The player was one of 30 selected by coach Diogo Siston to represent Corinthians in the 2022 edition of the Copa São Paulo de Futebol Júnior. The player was one of 30 selected by coach Danilo to represent Corinthians in the 2023 edition of the Copa São Paulo de Futebol Júnior. After the competition, he was promoted to the professional team under the command of Fernando Lázaro. Later, he returned to the U-20 team, remaining a starter until he tore the ACL in one of his knees.

Kauê was promoted to the Corinthians first team late in 2025, making his senior debut in the final fixture of the 2025 Campeonato Brasileiro Série A season. The debutant of the day made a good save during the match.

In April 2026, Kauê made his debut in Copa do Brasil. He started in the club's opening match of the fifth round of the competition against Barra at the Estádio da Ressacada. He was chosen after first-choice goalkeeper Hugo Souza was rested due to a congested fixture schedule. By that point, the 22-year-old had overtaken Felipe Longo as the immediate backup, having impressed the coaching staff during daily sessions at the CT Joaquim Grava club's training center. Head coach Fernando Diniz, who had recently taken charge of the team, valued Kauê's above-average distribution with his feet and his willingness to support the defenders and full-backs during build-up play. The coaching staff also highlighted his strong personality and composure, noting that he embraced the pressure of representing the club that had developed him through its youth system.

In July 2026, Corinthians board signed a contract renewal for goalkeeper Kauê, Hugo Souza's immediate backup. The 22-year-old, whose deal had been set to run until the end of the 2029 season, extended his contract until 4 July 2031. Under the new terms, Corinthians set a release clause of €100 million (R$579 million at the current exchange rate) for foreign clubs, while the release clause for domestic clubs was set at R$128 million.

== Career statistics ==
As of 6 September 2026

Club	Season	League			State league		Cup		Continental		Other		Total	
Club	Season	Division	Apps	Goals	Apps	Goals	Apps	Goals	Apps	Goals	Apps	Goals	Apps	Goals
Corinthians	2025	Série A	1	0	—		—		—		—		1	0
Corinthians	2026	Série A	4	0	0	0	1	0	0	0	—		5	0
Total			5	0	0	0	1	0	0	0	0	0	6	0

== Honours ==
Corinthians

- Copa do Brasil: 2025
- Supercopa do Brasil: 2026

Corinthians U17

- Campeonato Paulista Sub-17: 2021
