= Kayke Ferrari =

Brazilian footballer

Kayke
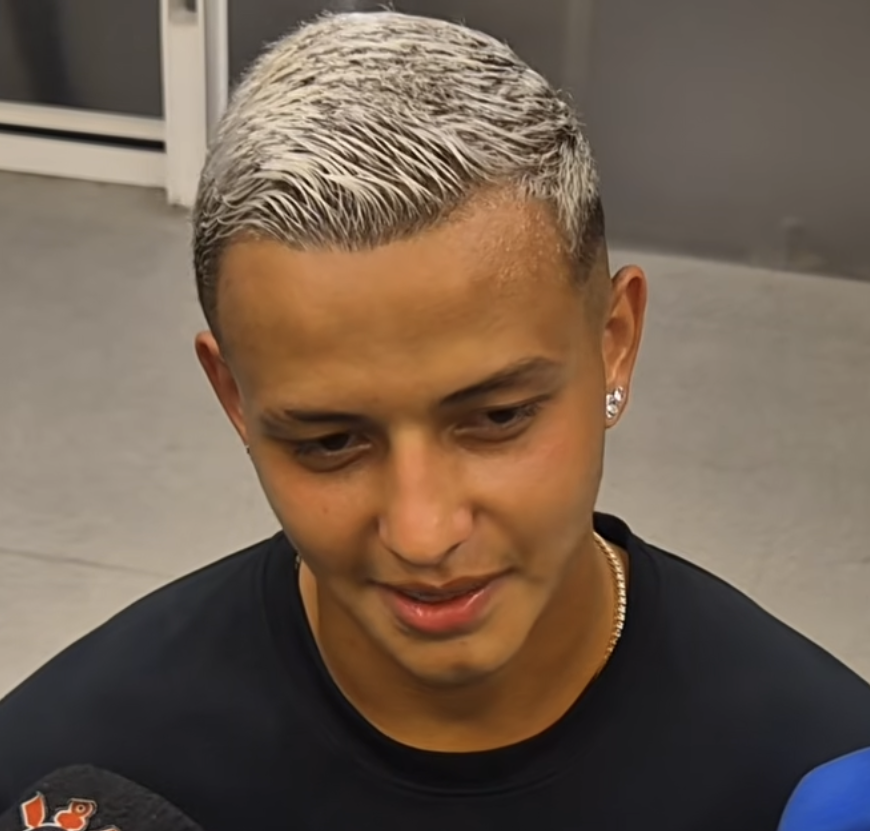
- Kayke in 2025

Personal information
- Full name: Kayke Ferrari Guimarães
- Date of birth: 28 April 2004 (age 22)
- Place of birth: Guarulhos, Brazil
- Height: 1.76 m (5 ft 9 in)
- Position: Forward

Team information
- Current team: Corinthians
- Number: 31

Youth career
- 2014–2015: ECUS
- 2015–2018: Palmeiras
- 2019–2021: São Caetano
- 2021–2024: Corinthians

Senior career*
Years	Team	Apps	(Gls)
2024–	Corinthians	22	(1)
- * Club domestic league appearances and goals as of 05:16, 18 April 2026 (UTC)

Kayke Ferrari Guimarães (born 28 April 2004), known as Kayke Ferrari or just Kayke, is a Brazilian footballer who plays as a forward for Corinthians.

== Career ==
Born in Guarulhos, São Paulo, Kayke played for the youth sides of Palmeiras and São Caetano before joining Corinthians in 2021. In January 2024, he scored the winning goal of the under-20s in the 2024 Copa São Paulo de Futebol Júnior, helping the side to win their 11th title.

Kayke made his senior debut on 30 January 2024, coming on as a second-half substitute for Ángel Romero in a 2–1 Campeonato Paulista home loss to São Paulo. On 20 June, he renewed his contract with the club until June 2027.

== Career statistics ==
As of 21 April 2026

Club	Season	League			State League		Cup		Continental		Other		Total	
Club	Season	Division	Apps	Goals	Apps	Goals	Apps	Goals	Apps	Goals	Apps	Goals	Apps	Goals
Corinthians	2024	Série A	2	0	1	0	0	0	0	0	—		3	0
Corinthians	2025	Série A	8	0	0	0	1	0	0	0	—		9	0
Corinthians	2026	Série A	6	0	5	1	1	0	2 (Note: Appearance(s) in Copa Libertadores)	1	—		15	2
Career total			16	0	6	1	2	0	2	1	0	0	27	2

== Honours ==
Corinthians U20

- Copa São Paulo de Futebol Júnior: 2024

Corinthians

- Campeonato Paulista: 2025
- Copa do Brasil: 2025
- Supercopa do Brasil: 2026
