= João Vitor (footballer, born 2007) =

Brazilian footballer (born 2007)

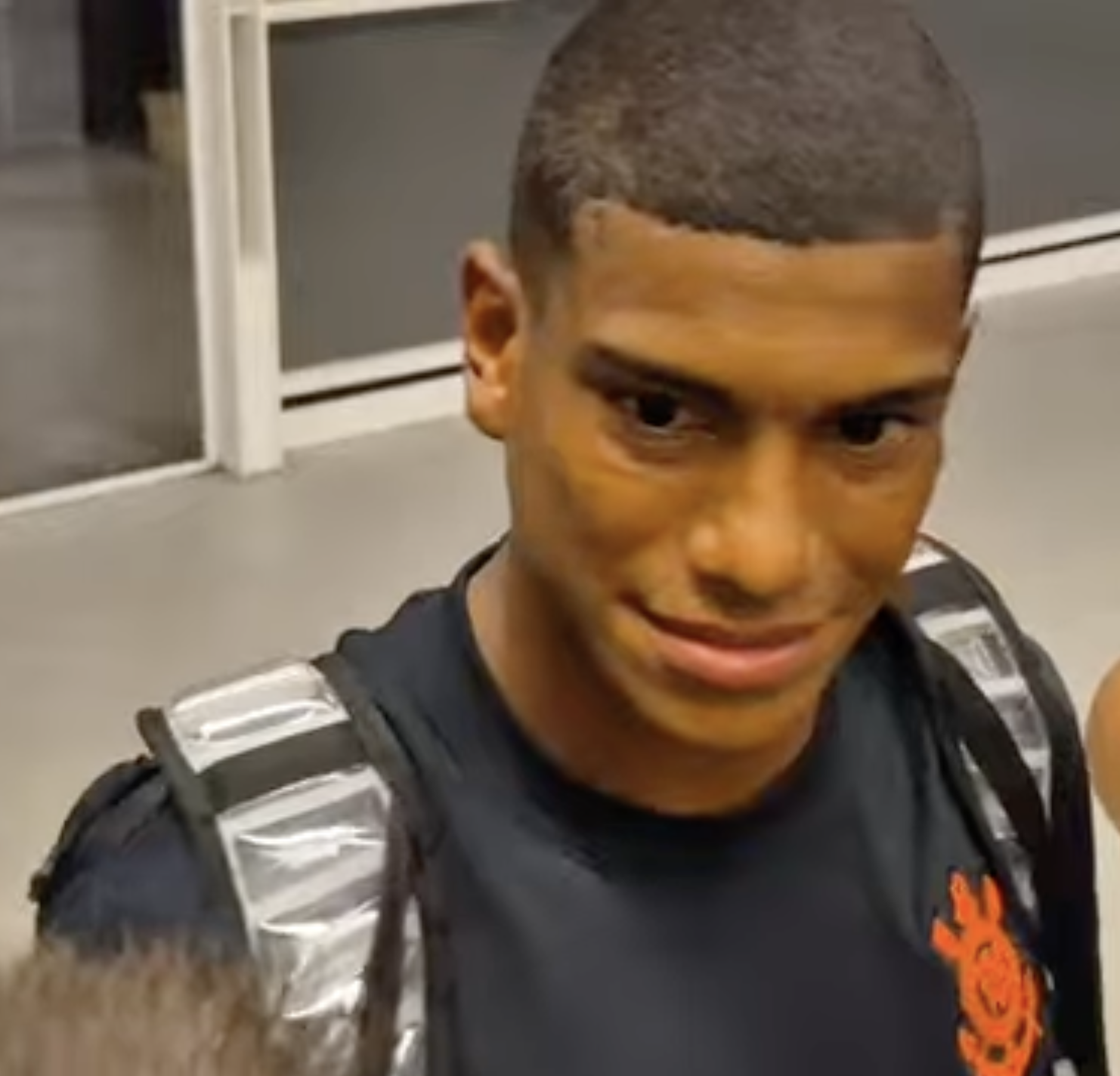

Personal information
- Full name: João Vitor Barros Silva
- Date of birth: 3 January 2007 (age 19)
- Place of birth: São Paulo, Brazil
- Height: 1.78 m (5 ft 10 in)
- Position: Right-back

Team information
- Current team: Corinthians
- Number: 59

Youth career
- 2023–2025: Corinthians

Senior career*
Years	Team	Apps	(Gls)
2025–	Corinthians	3	(0)
- * Club domestic league appearances and goals as of 28 January 2026

João Vitor Barros Silva (born 3 January 2007), better known as João Vitor or Jacaré, is a Brazilian professional footballer who plays as a right-back for Corinthians.

== Career ==
João Vitor made his professional debut for Corinthians on February 3, 2025. In his first game for Timão, Corinthians beat Grêmio Novorizontino 1-0, in a match valid for the 2025 Paulista Championship. On that occasion, the 18-year-old player started the match among the starters at Jorjão.

In January 2026, As part of the current squad, João Vitor last played professionally for Corinthians. In his last match for Timão, Corinthians beat Ponte Preta 3-0 in a match valid for the 2026 Campeonato Paulista. During the match João Vitor, then 19 years old, entered the field after starting the game on the bench at Neo Química Arena.

== Career statistics ==
As of 11 January 2026

Appearances and goals by club, season and competition
Club	Season	League			State League		Cup		Continental		Other		Total	
Club	Season	Division	Apps	Goals	Apps	Goals	Apps	Goals	Apps	Goals	Apps	Goals	Apps	Goals
Corinthians	2025	Série A	—		2	0	—		—		—		2	0
Corinthians	2026	Série A	0	0	1	0	0	0	0	0	0	0	1	0
Career total			0	0	3	0	0	0	0	0	0	0	3	0

== Honours ==
Corinthians

- Campeonato Paulista: 2025
- Supercopa do Brasil: 2026
