= Luiz Gustavo (footballer, born January 2006) =

Brazilian footballer

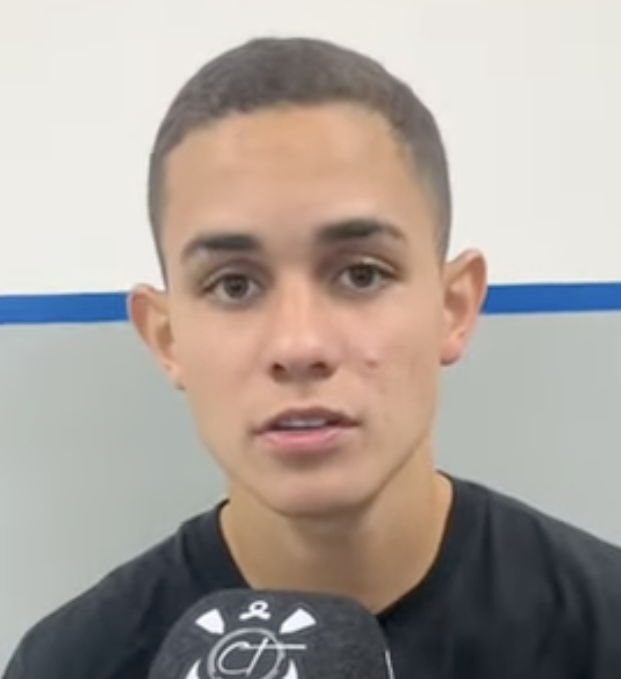

Personal information
- Full name: Luiz Gustavo Lemos Carvalho
- Date of birth: 2 January 2006 (age 20)
- Place of birth: Vitória da Conquista, Brazil
- Height: 1.78 m (5 ft 10 in)
- Position: Defensive midfielder

Team information
- Current team: Corinthians
- Number: 54

Youth career
- 2017–: Corinthians

Senior career*
Years	Team	Apps	(Gls)
2025 –	Corinthians	3	(0)

International career
2023	Brazil U17	6	(1)
- * Club domestic league appearances and goals as of 15 January 2026

Luiz Gustavo Lemos Carvalho (born 2 January 2006), simply known as Luiz Gustavo or by the nickname Bahia, is a Brazilian professional footballer who plays as a defensive midfielder for SC Corinthians.

== Youth career ==
Born in Vitória da Conquista, Bahia, Luiz Gustavo arrived at Corinthians at the age of 12. He gained prominence in particular by playing in the under-17 category in 2023, which earned him a place in the Brazil under-17 team and the South American title. For the dispute of the 2023 FIFA U-17 World Cup suffered a rectus femoris injury. After recovering, Luiz Gustavo was part of the champion squad of the 2024 Copa São Paulo de Futebol Jr.

== Career statistics ==
As of 15 January 2026

Appearances and goals by club, season and competition
Club	Season	League			State League		Cup		Continental		Other		Total	
Club	Season	Division	Apps	Goals	Apps	Goals	Apps	Goals	Apps	Goals	Apps	Goals	Apps	Goals
Corinthians	2025	Série A	2	0	1	0	—		—		—		3	0
Corinthians	2026	Série A	0	0	1	0	0	0	0	0	0	0	1	0
Career total			2	0	2	0	0	0	0	0	0	0	4	0

== Honours ==
Corinthians

- Campeonato Paulista: 2025
- Copa do Brasil: 2025
- Supercopa do Brasil: 2026

Corinthians (youth)

- Copa São Paulo de Futebol Jr.: 2024

Brazil U17

- South American U-17 Championship: 2023
