= Iago Machado =

Brazilian footballer

Personal information
- Full name: Iago da Silva Machado
- Date of birth: 17 February 2009 (age 17)
- Place of birth: São Bernardo do Campo, Brazil
- Height: 1.87 m (6 ft 2 in)
- Position: Centre-back

Team information
- Current team: Corinthians
- Number: 55

Youth career
- 2019–: Corinthians

Senior career*
Years	Team	Apps	(Gls)
2026–	Corinthians	2	(0)
- * Club domestic league appearances and goals as of 20 September 2026

Iago da Silva Machado (born 17 February 2009) is a Brazilian professional footballer who plays as a centre-back for Corinthians.

== Early life ==
Born in São Bernardo do Campo, São Paulo, Machado joined Corinthians as a child to play futsal, starting out as a pivot before moving to football, where he settled as a centre-back, although he has also been tested at right-back and as a defensive midfielder.

== Club career ==
A regular standout in Corinthians' youth categories, Machado turned down interest from Palmeiras as a youngster to remain at the club. In 2025, he became a starter for the under-17 side despite being one of the youngest players in the squad, and impressed internally following the under-17 team's participation in the Torneio da Andaluzia in Spain. He finished the year as the team's third-highest scorer, with nine goals.

Following that tournament, Machado signed a contract extension with Corinthians, formalised in October 2025, which set release clauses of R$66 million for the Brazilian market—the highest among the club's youth players at the time and €100 million for clubs abroad, with the deal running until 16 April 2028.

In January 2026, with interest from European clubs such as Arsenal and Ajax growing following his performances at the Copa São Paulo de Futebol Júnior, Corinthians moved to protect the club's position by raising his release clauses. That same month, manager Dorival Júnior promoted Machado to train with the first team, with the initial plan being a gradual integration over the course of the year ahead of a fuller role in 2027. He continued to combine first-team training with appearances for Corinthians' youth sides throughout 2026.

Machado made his first-team debut on 13 September 2026, starting alongside fellow academy graduate João Pedro in a 2–1 away defeat to Flamengo at the Maracanã Stadium in the Campeonato Brasileiro Série A.

== Career statistics ==
As of 20 September 2026

Appearances and goals by club, season and competition
Club	Season	League			State league		National cup		Continental		Other		Total	
Club	Season	Division	Apps	Goals	Apps	Goals	Apps	Goals	Apps	Goals	Apps	Goals	Apps	Goals
Corinthians	2026	Série A	2	0	—		—		0	0	—		2	0
Career total			2	0	0	0	0	0	0	0	0	0	2	0
