= Thomas Lisboa =

Brazilian footballer (born 2005)

Personal information
- Full name: Thomas Rafael Gonçalves Lisboa
- Date of birth: 20 January 2005 (age 21)
- Place of birth: São Paulo, Brazil
- Position: Defensive midfielder

Team information
- Current team: Tammeka
- Number: 7

Youth career
- 2015–2026: Corinthians

Senior career*
Years	Team	Apps	(Gls)
2026–	Tammeka	33	(2)
- * Club domestic league appearances and goals as of 17 November 2026

Thomas Rafael Gonçalves Lisboa (born 20 January 2005), known as Thomas Lisboa, is a Brazilian professional footballer who plays mainly as a defensive midfielder for JK Tammeka.

== Club career ==
Born in São Paulo, Thomas Lisboa joined Corinthians' youth categories in 2015, aged ten. He signed a professional contract with the club in 2025, and renewed his link until 31 December 2026.

In early 2023, Thomas Lisboa was promoted from the u17 ranks of Corinthians to the club's u20 side by manager Danilo, ahead of the Campeonato Paulista de Futebol Sub-20 season. Lisboa, as he is known, marked his promotion by scoring the only goal in a 1–0 victory over Inter de Limeira at the Estádio Alfredo Schürig — his maiden goal for the Corinthians under-20 team.

Ahead of the 2026 Copa São Paulo de Futebol Júnior, Corinthians reinforced their u20 squad with four homegrown additions — players who had been training with the senior team, including Thomas Lisboa. A defensive midfielder set to captain the side under manager William Batista, later recounted how senior head coach Dorival Júnior had informed him of his move back to the Corinthians Youth team setup. By that point, Lisboa had made 15 appearances as a starter for the Corinthians first team.

In February 2026, following the conclusion of the 2026 Copa São Paulo de Futebol Júnior, Lisboa departed Corinthians and signed for Tartu JK Tammeka of the Estonian Meistriliiga, with the Estonian club officially announcing the transfer through its social media channels.

== Career statistics ==
As of match played 10 May 2026

Appearances and goals by club, season and competition
Club	Season	League			State league		Cup		Continental		Other		Total	
Club	Season	Division	Apps	Goals	Apps	Goals	Apps	Goals	Apps	Goals	Apps	Goals	Apps	Goals
Tammeka	2025	Meistriliiga	15	0	—		—		—		—		15	0
Career total			15	0	—		—		—		—		15	0

== Honours ==
Corinthians U20

- Copa São Paulo de Futebol Júnior: 2024
