= Pedro Milans =

Uruguayan footballer (born 2002)

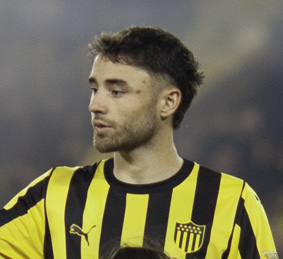
- Milans with Peñarol in 2024

Personal information
- Full name: Pedro Milans Carámbula
- Date of birth: 24 March 2002 (age 24)
- Place of birth: Las Piedras, Uruguay
- Height: 1.71 m (5 ft 7 in)
- Position: Right-back

Team information
- Current team: Corinthians
- Number: 20

Youth career
- Juventud

Senior career*
Years	Team	Apps	(Gls)
2019–2022	Juventud	59	(1)
2022–2025	Peñarol	84	(0)
2026–	Corinthians	12	(0)

International career
2016–2017	Uruguay U15	25	(0)
2018–2019	Uruguay U17	22	(1)
- * Club domestic league appearances and goals as of 5 November 2026

Pedro Milans Carámbula (born 24 March 2002) is a Uruguayan professional footballer who plays as a right-back for Campeonato Brasileiro Serie A club Corinthians.

== Club career ==
Milans made his professional debut on 6 December 2019 in a 3–0 league defeat against Nacional. He started the match and played 75 minutes before getting replaced by Eric Barrios.

On 18 July 2022, Milans joined Peñarol on a contract until December 2023.

== International career ==
Milans is a former Uruguayan youth international. He was part of national team squad which played at the 2017 South American U-15 Championship and the 2019 South American U-17 Championship.

== Career statistics ==
As of 5 November 2026

Appearances and goals by club, season and competition
Club	Season	League			State league		National cup		Continental		Other		Total	
Club	Season	Division	Apps	Goals	Apps	Goals	Apps	Goals	Apps	Goals	Apps	Goals	Apps	Goals
Juventud	2019	Liga Uruguaya	1	0	0	0	0	0	0	0	—		1	0
Juventud	2020	Uruguayan Segunda División	21	1	0	0	0	0	0	0	—		21	1
Juventud	2021	Uruguayan Segunda División	21	0	0	0	0	0	0	0	—		21	0
Juventud	2022	Uruguayan Segunda División	16	1	0	0	1	1	0	0	—		17	2
Juventud	Total		59	2	0	0	1	1	0	0	—		60	3
Peñarol	2022	Liga Uruguaya	4	0	0	0	4	1	0	0	—		8	1
Peñarol	2023	Liga Uruguaya	23	0	0	0	1	1	4 (Note: appearances in Copa Sudamericana)	1	—		28	2
Peñarol	2024	Liga Uruguaya	24	0	0	0	0	0	10 (Note: appearances in Copa Libertadores)	0	—		34	0
Peñarol	2025	Liga Uruguaya	33	0	0	0	2	0	6 (Note: appearances in Copa Libertadores)	0	1 (Note: appearances in Supercopa Uruguaya)	0	42	0
Peñarol	Total		84	0	0	0	7	2	20	1	1	0	112	3
Corinthians	2026	Série A	9	0	3	0	0	0	1 (Note: appearances in Copa Libertadores)	0	—		13	0
Career total			152	2	3	0	8	3	21	1	1	0	185	6

== Honours ==
Peñarol

- Uruguayan Primera División: 2024
- Copa Uruguay: 2025

Corinthians

- Supercopa do Brasil: 2026
