= Breno Bidon =

Brazilian footballer (born 2005)

- Bidon in 2026

Personal information
- Full name: Breno de Souza Bidon
- Date of birth: 20 February 2005 (age 21)
- Place of birth: São Paulo, Brazil
- Height: 1.78 m (5 ft 10 in)
- Position: Central midfielder

Team information
- Current team: Corinthians
- Number: 7

Youth career
- 2011–2016: Portuguesa
- 2017–2018: Osasco Audax
- 2019–2024: Corinthians

Senior career*
Years	Team	Apps	(Gls)
2024–	Corinthians	107	(4)

International career^{‡}
2025	Brazil U20	10	(1)
2026–	Brazil	2	(0)
Medal record
Men's football
Representing Brazil
South American U-20 Championship
Winner	2025 Venezuela
- * Club domestic league appearances and goals as of 18 November 2026 ‡ National team caps and goals as of 3 October 2026

Breno de Souza Bidon (born 20 February 2005) is a Brazilian professional footballer who plays as a central midfielder for Corinthians and the Brazil national team.

== Club career ==
=== Early career ===
Bidon began his career with Portuguesa's U-7 Youth Team in 2011, where he remained until 2017, when he signed with Grêmio Audax. After spending the 2017 and 2018 seasons at the club, he was signed by Corinthians, still as an under-17 player. He gained prominence at the club's youth rankings, playing alongside Gabriel Moscardo during the 2023 editions of the Copa São Paulo de Futebol Júnior and the U-20 Brazilian Championship.

In January 2024, he was considered the best player in the tournament after helping Corinthians win the 2024 Copa São Paulo de Futebol Júnior. His long range effort against América Mineiro was regarded by the media as the most beautiful goal of the quarter-finals of the competition.

=== Corinthians ===
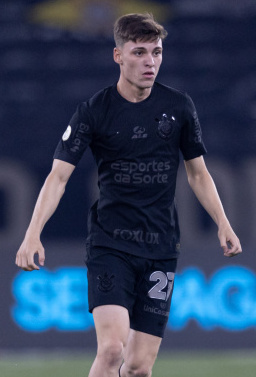
Bidon playing for Corinthians in 2024

During the 2024 season, he became a member of Corinthians' main squad, amassing more than 1000 minutes of regular playtime in the national league, scoring his first professional goal versus América de Natal on the away leg for the third round of the Copa do Brasil tournament. His displays attracted interest from Bayern Munich scouts, prompting Timão to set a release clause of R$ 100 million on his contract.

In the second leg of the 2025 Copa do Brasil final against Vasco da Gama, Bidon initiated a counterattack with a quick turn past an opponent in midfield, contributing to the build-up to the goal that secured Corinthians the title. His performances drew praise from players such as Kaká and Neto.

== International career ==
After playing for the Brazil national under-20 team, Bidon was called up to the full side by Carlo Ancelotti for three friendlies against Australia and India on 9 September 2026.

== Career statistics ==
As of match played 18 November 2026

Appearances and goals by club, season and competition
Club	Season	League			State League		National Cup		Continental		Other		Total	
Club	Season	Division	Apps	Goals	Apps	Goals	Apps	Goals	Apps	Goals	Apps	Goals	Apps	Goals
Corinthians	2024	Série A	29	0	1	0	5	1	9 (Note: Appearances in Copa Sudamericana)	0	—		44	1
Corinthians	2025	Série A	33	1	4	0	10	0	9 (Note: Four appearances in Copa Libertadores, five appearances in Copa Sudamericana)	0	—		56	1
Corinthians	2026	Série A	32	2	8	1	3	0	9 (Note: Appearances in Copa Libertadores)	1	1 (Note: Appearance in Supercopa do Brasil)	0	53	4
Career total			94	3	13	1	18	1	27	1	1	0	153	6

=== International ===
As of match played 3 October 2026

Appearances and goals by national team and year
National team	Year	Apps	Goals
Brazil	2026	2	0
Total		2	0

== Honours ==
Corinthians U20

- Copa São Paulo de Futebol Júnior: 2024

Corinthians

- Copa do Brasil: 2025
- Supercopa do Brasil: 2026
- Campeonato Paulista: 2025

Brazil U20

- South American U-20 Championship: 2025

Individual

- Copa São Paulo Player of the Tournament: 2024
