= Matheuzinho (footballer, born 2000) =

Brazilian footballer

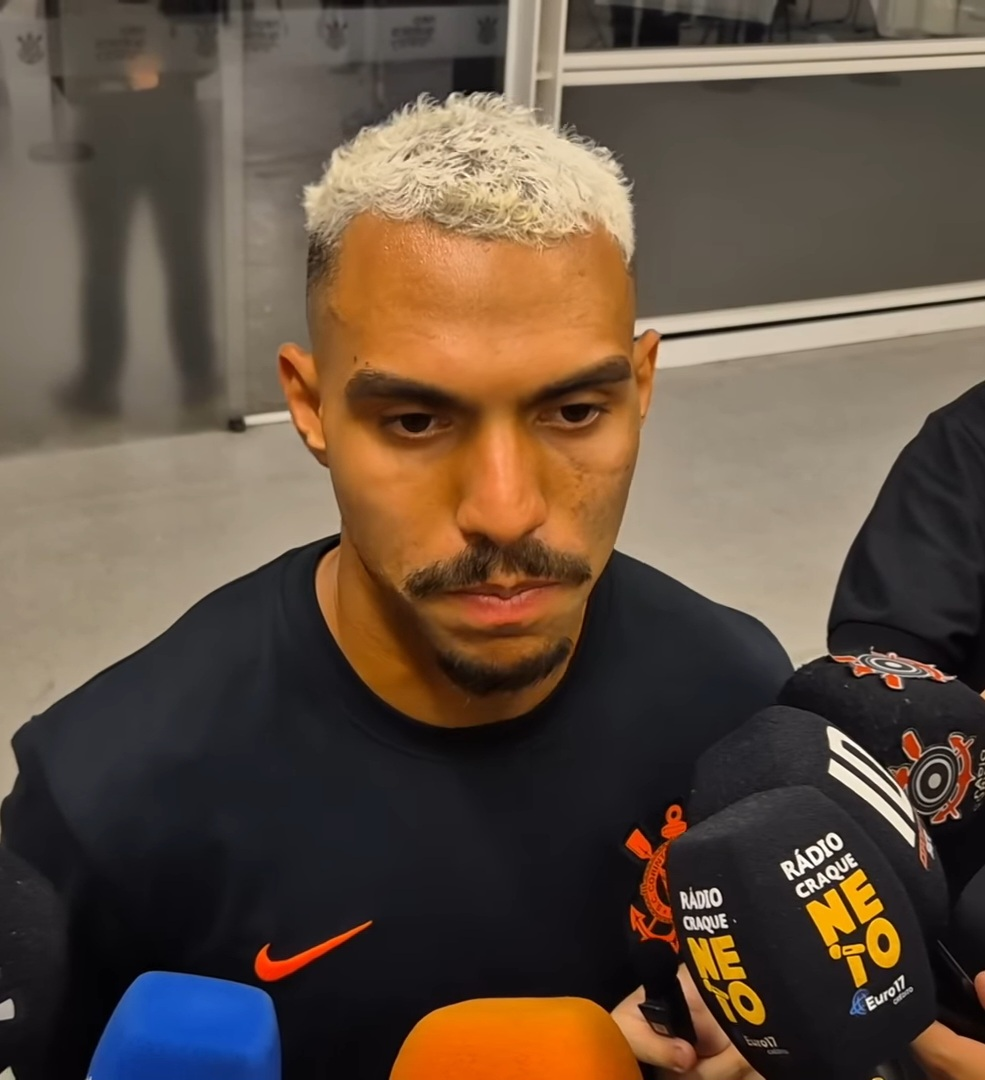
- Matheuzinho in 2026

Personal information
- Full name: Matheus França Silva
- Date of birth: 8 September 2000 (age 26)
- Place of birth: Londrina, Brazil
- Height: 1.71 m (5 ft 7 in)
- Position: Right-back

Team information
- Current team: Corinthians
- Number: 2

Youth career
- 2015–2019: Londrina
- 2019–2020: Flamengo

Senior career*
| Years | Team | Apps | (Gls) |
| 2018–2019 | Londrina | 18 | (0) |
| 2020–2024 | Flamengo | 110 | (1) |
| 2024– | Corinthians | 113 | (3) |

International career^{‡}
| 2026– | Brazil | 3 | (0) |
- * Club domestic league appearances and goals as of 18 November 2026 ‡ National team caps and goals as of 3 October 2026

Matheus França Silva (born 8 September 2000), also known as Matheuzinho, is a Brazilian professional footballer who plays as a right-back for Campeonato Brasileiro Série A club Corinthians and the Brazil national team.

== Club career ==
=== Flamengo ===
In January 2019, Flamengo agreed to sign Matheuzinho from Londrina for a €180.000 fee; Londrina kept 50% of his rights.

On 2 June 2022, Matheuzinho extended his contract with Flamengo until 31 December 2026.

=== Corinthians ===
On 16 February 2024, Matheuzinho was announced at Campeonato Brasileiro Série A side Corinthians on a five-year contract.

== International career ==
On 25 September 2026, Matheuzinho made his debut for the Brazil national team in a friendly against Australia.

== Career statistics ==
As of match played 18 November 2026

Appearances and goals by club, season and competition
| Club | Season | League | | | State league (Note: Includes Campeonato Paranaense, Campeonato Carioca, Campeonato Paulista) | | Cup (Note: Includes Copa do Brasil) | | Continental | | Other | | Total | |
| Club | Season | Division | Apps | Goals | Apps | Goals | Apps | Goals | Apps | Goals | Apps | Goals | Apps | Goals |
|---|---|---|---|---|---|---|---|---|---|---|---|---|---|---|
| Londrina | 2018 | Série B | 4 | 0 | 9 | 0 | 2 | 0 | — | | — | | 15 | 0 |
| Londrina | 2019 | Série B | 0 | 0 | 5 | 0 | 0 | 0 | — | | — | | 5 | 0 |
| Londrina | Total | | 4 | 0 | 14 | 0 | 2 | 0 | — | | — | | 20 | 0 |
| Flamengo | 2020 | Série A | 13 | 0 | 3 | 0 | 3 | 0 | 2 (Note: Appearances in Copa Libertadores) | 0 | — | | 21 | 0 |
| Flamengo | 2021 | Série A | 22 | 0 | 13 | 0 | 6 | 0 | 7 | 0 | 1 (Note: Appearance in Supercopa do Brasil) | 0 | 49 | 0 |
| Flamengo | 2022 | Série A | 28 | 1 | 10 | 0 | 3 | 0 | 5 | 1 | 1 | 0 | 47 | 2 |
| Flamengo | 2023 | Série A | 11 | 0 | 10 | 0 | 2 | 0 | 0 | 0 | 3 (Note: One appearance in Supercopa do Brasil, one appearance in Recopa Sudamericana, one appearance in FIFA Club World Cup) | 0 | 26 | 0 |
| Flamengo | Total | | 74 | 1 | 36 | 0 | 14 | 0 | 14 | 1 | 5 | 0 | 143 | 2 |
| Corinthians | 2024 | Série A | 31 | 1 | 3 | 0 | 7 | 0 | 10 (Note: Appearances in Copa Libertadores and appearances and one goal in Copa Sudamericana) | 1 | — | | 51 | 2 |
| Corinthians | 2025 | Série A | 31 | 2 | 10 | 0 | 9 | 0 | 8 (Note: Appearances in Copa Libertadores and appearances and one goal in Copa Sudamericana) | 1 | — | | 58 | 3 |
| Corinthians | 2026 | Série A | 29 | 1 | 9 | 0 | 4 | 0 | 9 (Note: Appearances in Copa Libertadores and appearances) | 0 | 1 (Note: Appearance in Supercopa do Brasil) | 0 | 52 | 1 |
| Corinthians | Total | | 91 | 4 | 22 | 0 | 20 | 0 | 27 | 2 | 1 | 0 | 161 | 6 |
| Career total | | | 169 | 5 | 72 | 0 | 36 | 0 | 41 | 3 | 6 | 0 | 324 | 8 |

=== International ===
As of match played 3 October 2026

Appearances and goals by national team and year
| National team | Year | Apps | Goals |
|---|---|---|---|
| Brazil | 2026 | 3 | 0 |
| Total | | 3 | 0 |

== Honours ==
Flamengo

- Série A: 2020
- Copa do Brasil: 2022
- Supercopa do Brasil: 2021
- Copa Libertadores: 2022
- Campeonato Carioca: 2020, 2021

Corinthians

- Copa do Brasil: 2025
- Campeonato Paulista: 2025
- Supercopa do Brasil: 2026

Individual

- Campeonato Carioca Team of the Year: 2021
- Troféu Mesa Redonda Team of the Year: 2025
