= Matheus Bidu =

Brazilian footballer (born 1999)

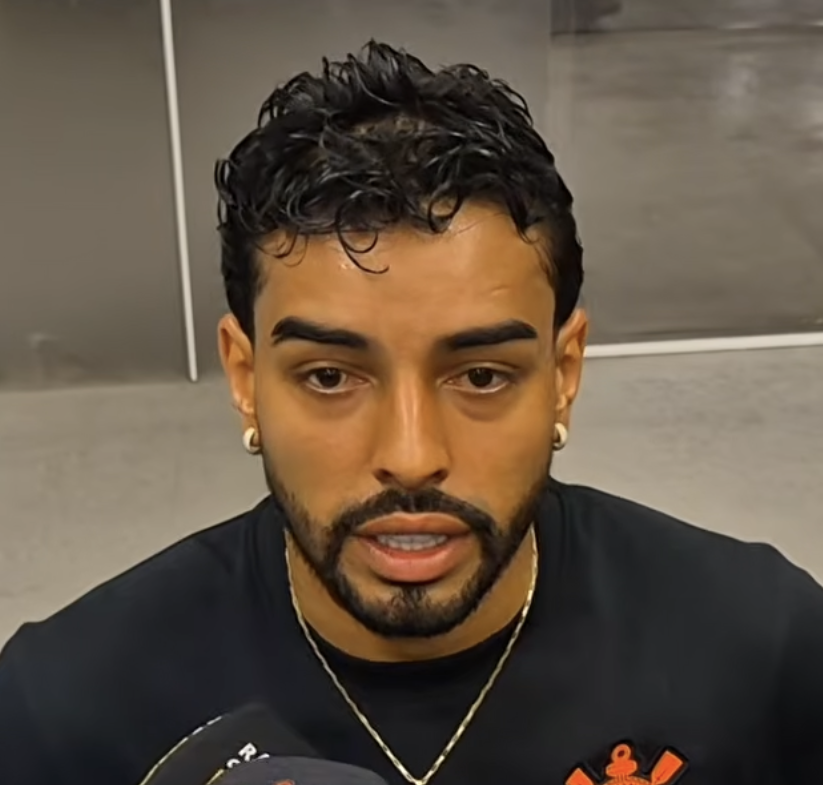

Personal information
- Full name: Matheus Lima Beltrão Oliveira
- Date of birth: 4 May 1999 (age 27)
- Place of birth: São Paulo, Brazil
- Height: 1.72 m (5 ft 8 in)
- Position: Left back

Team information
- Current team: Corinthians
- Number: 21

Youth career
- Lemense
- 2015–2017: Portuguesa
- 2018–2019: Guarani

Senior career*
Years	Team	Apps	(Gls)
2019–2022	Guarani	90	(8)
2022	→ Cruzeiro (loan)	34	(3)
2023–	Corinthians	124	(7)
- * Club domestic league appearances and goals as of 18 November 2026

Matheus Lima Beltrão Oliveira (born 4 May 1999), known as Matheus Bidu or simply Bidu, is a Brazilian footballer who plays as a left back for Corinthians.

== Career ==
=== Guarani ===
Born in São Paulo, Bidu joined Guarani's youth setup in 2018, after representing Portuguesa and Lemense. On 17 January 2019, after impressing with the under-20s in the year's Copa São Paulo de Futebol Júnior, he renewed his contract with the club for three years.

Bidu made his professional debut on 21 September 2019, starting in a 1–0 Série B home win against Paraná. He contributed with four league appearances during the campaign, as his side avoided relegation.

Bidu scored his first senior goal on 2 February 2020, netting a last-minute winner in a 2–1 home defeat of Santo André for the Campeonato Paulista championship. He subsequently became an undisputed starter for the club.

==== Cruzeiro (loan) ====
On 25 January 2022, Bidu was loaned to fellow second division Cruzeiro until the end of the year. Despite being regularly used in the club's 2022 Série B winning campaign, Bidu was not bought outright. On 16 December of that year, he extended his contract with Guarani until 2024.

=== Corinthians ===
On 28 December 2022, Bidu was announced at Corinthians on a three-year contract. Initially a backup to Fábio Santos during the 2023 Campeonato Paulista, he made his Série A debut on 16 April of that year, starting in a 2–1 home win over former side Cruzeiro.

Bidu was not registered by Corinthians in the 2024 Campeonato Paulista, only returning to action with the side after the arrival of new head coach António Oliveira.

== Career statistics ==
As of match played 18 November 2026

Club	Season	League			State league (Note: Includes Campeonato Paulista, Campeonato Mineiro)		Cup (Note: IncludesCopa do Brasil)		Continental		Other		Total	
Club	Season	Division	Apps	Goals	Apps	Goals	Apps	Goals	Apps	Goals	Apps	Goals	Apps	Goals
Guarani	2019	Série B	4	0	—		—		—		—		4	0
Guarani	2020	Série B	30	3	11	1	—		—		—		41	4
Guarani	2021	Série B	35	4	10	0	—		—		—		45	4
Guarani	Total		69	7	21	1	—		—		—		90	8
Cruzeiro (loan)	2022	Série B	28	2	6	1	5	0	—		—		39	3
Corinthians	2023	Série A	24	0	3	0	3	1	8 (Note: Appearances in Copa Libertadores and appearances in Copa Sudamericana)	0	—		38	1
Corinthians	2024	Série A	23	2	0	0	5	0	5 (Note: Appearances in Copa Sudamericana)	0	—		33	2
Corinthians	2025	Série A	26	0	10	1	8	2	5 (Note: Appearances in Copa Libertadores and appearances in Copa Sudamericana)	2	—		49	5
Corinthians	2026	Série A	28	5	9	0	3	0	9 (Note: Appearances in Copa Libertadores)	0	1 (Note: Appearance in Supercopa do Brasil)	0	50	5
Corinthians	Total		102	7	22	1	19	3	27	2	1	0	171	13
Career total			199	16	49	3	24	3	27	2	1	0	300	24

== Honours ==
Cruzeiro

- Série B: 2022

Corinthians

- Copa do Brasil: 2025
- Campeonato Paulista: 2025
- Supercopa do Brasil: 2026
