= André Luiz (footballer, born 2006) =

Brazilian footballer (born 2006)

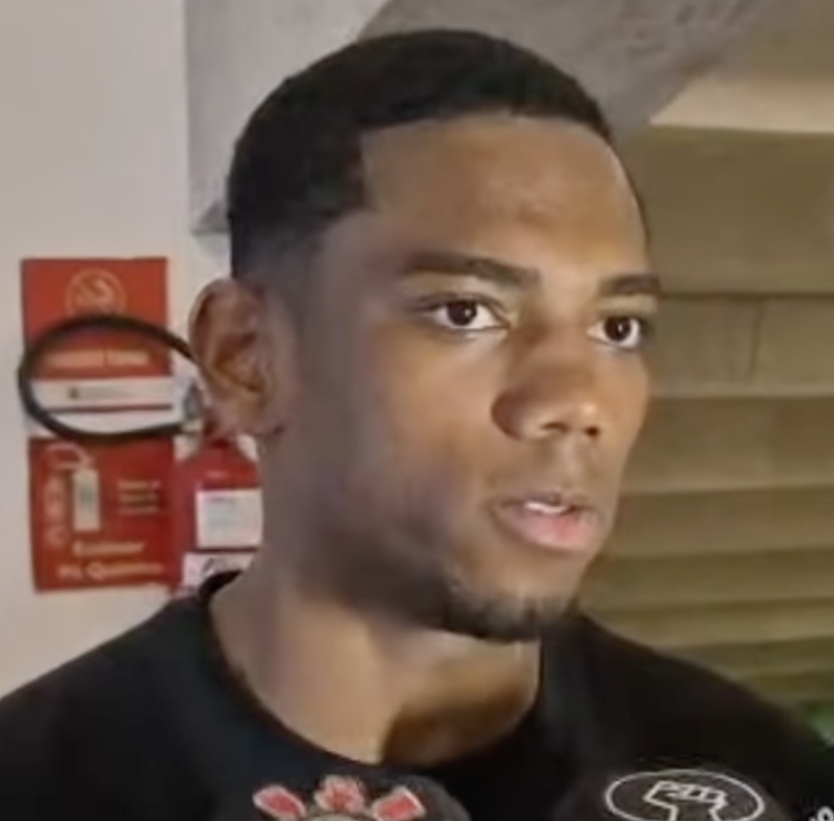
- André with Corinthians in 2025

Personal information
- Full name: André Luiz Santos Dias
- Date of birth: 20 June 2006 (age 20)
- Place of birth: São Paulo, Brazil
- Height: 1.81 m (5 ft 11 in)
- Position: Defensive midfielder

Team information
- Current team: Corinthians
- Number: 49

Youth career
- 2016–2025: Corinthians

Senior career*
Years	Team	Apps	(Gls)
2025–	Corinthians	41	(8)

International career^{‡}
2026–	Brazil	2	(0)
- * Club domestic league appearances and goals as of 5 November 2026 (UTC) ‡ National team caps and goals as of 17 November 2026 (UTC)

André Luiz Santos Dias (born 20 June 2006), known as André Luiz or just André, is a Brazilian footballer who plays mainly as a defensive midfielder for Corinthians and the Brazil national team.

== Club career ==
Born in São Paulo, André joined Corinthians' youth categories in 2016, aged ten. He signed a professional contract with the club in 2023, and renewed his link until 2029 on 25 August 2025.

André made his first team – and Série A – debut on 13 September 2025, coming on as a second-half substitute for fellow youth graduate Maycon in a 1–0 win over Fluminense at the Maracanã Stadium. He scored his first professional goal on 4 October, netting his side's third in a 3–0 home win over Mirassol.

André started the 2026 season as a first-choice, helping Timão to win the Supercopa do Brasil and being named the Campeonato Paulista Breakthrough Player. His performances attracted the interest of AC Milan, but Corinthians rejected the offers from the Italian club.

== International career ==
On 29 October 2026, André was called up to the Brazil national team by Carlo Ancelotti for two friendlies against Japan and Singapore.

== Career statistics ==
As of match played 5 November 2026

Club	Season	League			State league		Cup		Continental		Other		Total	
Club	Season	Division	Apps	Goals	Apps	Goals	Apps	Goals	Apps	Goals	Apps	Goals	Apps	Goals
Corinthians	2025	Série A	9	2	0	0	3	0	0	0	—		12	2
Corinthians	2026	Série A	24	4	8	2	3	0	6 (Note: Appearances in Copa Libertadores)	0	1 (Note: Appearance in Supercopa do Brasil)	0	42	6
Total			33	6	8	2	6	0	6	0	1	0	54	8

== Honours ==
Corinthians U20

- Copa São Paulo de Futebol Júnior: 2024

Corinthians

- Copa do Brasil: 2025
- Supercopa do Brasil: 2026

Individual

- Campeonato Paulista Breakthrough Player: 2026
