= Kaio César =

Brazilian footballer (born 2004)

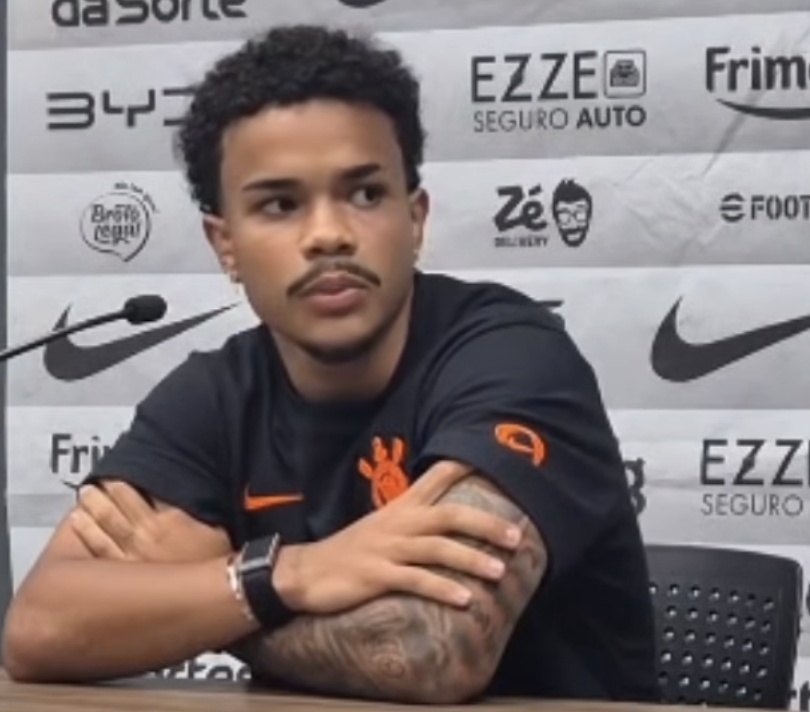
- Kaio César with Corinthians in 2026

Personal information
- Full name: Kaio César Andrade Lima
- Date of birth: 15 February 2004 (age 22)
- Place of birth: Maceió, Brazil
- Height: 1.68 m (5 ft 6 in)
- Position: Winger

Team information
- Current team: Corinthians (on loan from Al-Hilal)
- Number: 37

Youth career
- 2018–2023: Coritiba

Senior career*
Years	Team	Apps	(Gls)
2023–2025	Coritiba	32	(2)
2024–2025	→ Vitória Guimarães (loan)	28	(2)
2025	Vitória Guimarães	1	(0)
2025–	Al-Hilal	22	(3)
2026–	→ Corinthians (loan)	23	(6)

International career^{‡}
2023–	Brazil U23	5	(0)
Medal record
Men's football
Representing Brazil
Pan American Games
Winner	2023 Santiago
- * Club domestic league appearances and goals as of 18 November 2026 ‡ National team caps and goals as of 4 November 2023

Kaio César Andrade Lima (born 15 February 2004), known as Kaio César or just Kaio, is a Brazilian professional footballer who plays as a winger for Corinthians, on loan from Al-Hilal.

== Club career ==
=== Coritiba ===
Born in Maceió, Alagoas, Kaio joined Coritiba's youth setup in 2018, aged 14. On 15 December 2022, he renewed his contract with the club until 2024, being promoted to the first team for the 2023 season.

Kaio made his professional debut on 18 January 2023, coming on as a late substitute for Alef Manga in a 3–0 Campeonato Paranaense away win over Foz do Iguaçu. Eleven days later, in his first match as a starter, he scored his side's second in a 2–2 home draw against Azuriz.

On 8 February 2023, Coritiba announced the renewal of Kaio's contract until 2026.

=== Vitória de Guimarães ===
On 31 January 2024, Kaio joined Portuguese Primeira Liga club Vitória de Guimarães on loan until the end of the 2023–24 season, with an optional buy-clause, reported to be around €1.5 million. On 27 June, his loan was extended for a further year.

On 7 January 2025, Kaio agreed to a permanent four-year deal with Vitória.

=== Al-Hilal ===
On 21 January 2025, Saudi club Al-Hilal announced the signing of Kaio on a three-and-a-half-year contract for a reported fee of €10 million, following Vitória's activation of the buyout clause.

==== Loan to Corinthians ====
On 29 January 2026, Corinthians announced the signing of Kaio on loan for the season.

== Career statistics ==
As of match played 18 November 2026

Appearances and goals by club, season and competition
Club	Season	League			State league (Note: Includes Campeonato Paranaense, Campeonato Paulista)		National cup (Note: Includes Copa do Brasil, Taça de Portugal, King's Cup)		League cup (Note: Includes Taça da Liga)		Continental		Other		Total	
Club	Season	Division	Apps	Goals	Apps	Goals	Apps	Goals	Apps	Goals	Apps	Goals	Apps	Goals	Apps	Goals
Coritiba	2023	Série A	24	0	8	2	4	1	—		—		—		36	3
Vitória Guimarães (loan)	2023–24	Primeira Liga	12	0	—		2	0	—		—		—		14	0
Vitória Guimarães (loan)	2024–25	Primeira Liga	16	2	—		2	1	1	0	12 (Note: Appearances in UEFA Conference League)	1	—		31	4
Vitória Guimarães	2024–25	Primeira Liga	1	0	—		1	0	—		—		—		2	0
Vitória Guimarães	Total		29	2	—		5	1	1	0	12	1	—		47	4
Al-Hilal	2024–25	Saudi Pro League	12	3	—		—		—		6 (Note: Appearances in AFC Champions League Elite)	0	2 (Note: Appearances in FIFA Club World Cup)	0	20	3
Al-Hilal	2025–26	Saudi Pro League	10	0	—		3	0	—		6	1	—		19	1
Al-Hilal	Total		22	3	—		3	0	—		12	1	2	0	39	4
Corinthians (loan)	2026	Série A	22	6	1	0	4	0	—		8 (Note: Appearances in Copa Libertadores)	1	1 (Note: Appearance in Supercopa do Brasil)	0	36	7
Career total			97	11	9	2	16	2	1	0	32	3	3	0	158	18

== Honours ==
Corinthians

- Supercopa do Brasil: 2026

Brasil U23

- Pan American Games: 2023
