= Denner (footballer, born 2008) =

Brazilian footballer

Personal information
- Full name: Denner Alves Evangelista Pereira
- Date of birth: 25 February 2008 (age 18)
- Place of birth: São Paulo, Brazil
- Position: Left-back

Team information
- Current team: Chelsea

Youth career
- 2021–2026: Corinthians
- 2026–: Chelsea

International career
| Years | Team | Apps | (Gls) |
| 2024 | Brazil U15 | | |
| 2025– | Brazil U17 | 3 | (0) |

Denner Alves Evangelista Pereira (born 25 February 2008), simply known as Denner, is a Brazilian professional footballer who plays as a left-back for Premier League club Chelsea.

== Club career ==
In 2021, Denner arrived in the Corinthians youth sector at the age of 13. In 2024, at the age of 16, he caught attention when he was promoted directly to the under-20 category. In 2025, Denner confirmed expectations and was the club's highlight in the runner-up campaign of the Copa São Paulo de Futebol Júnior.

On 29 January 2025, a sale agreement to Premier League club Chelsea for €8 million was revealed, with the player's departure after he turns 18. The transfer was made official on 3 September 2026.

== International career ==
Denner was called up by coach Dudu Patetuci for the preparatory friendlies for the 2025 South American U-17 Championship, where the Brazil won the title.

== Career statistics ==
As of match played 4 September 2026

Appearances and goals by club, season and competition
| Club | Season | League | | | Cup | | League Cup | | Europe | | Other | | Total | |
| Club | Season | Division | Apps | Goals | Apps | Goals | Apps | Goals | Apps | Goals | Apps | Goals | Apps | Goals |
|---|---|---|---|---|---|---|---|---|---|---|---|---|---|---|
| Chelsea Academy | 2026–27 | — | | | — | | — | | — | | 0 | 0 | 0 | 0 |
| Career total | | | 0 | 0 | 0 | 0 | 0 | 0 | 0 | 0 | 0 | 0 | 0 | 0 |

== Personal life ==
Denner is cousin of Gabriel Magalhães who is currently playing for Premier League club Arsenal.

== Honours ==
Brazil U17

- South American U-17 Championship: 2025
