= Felipe Longo =

Brazilian footballer

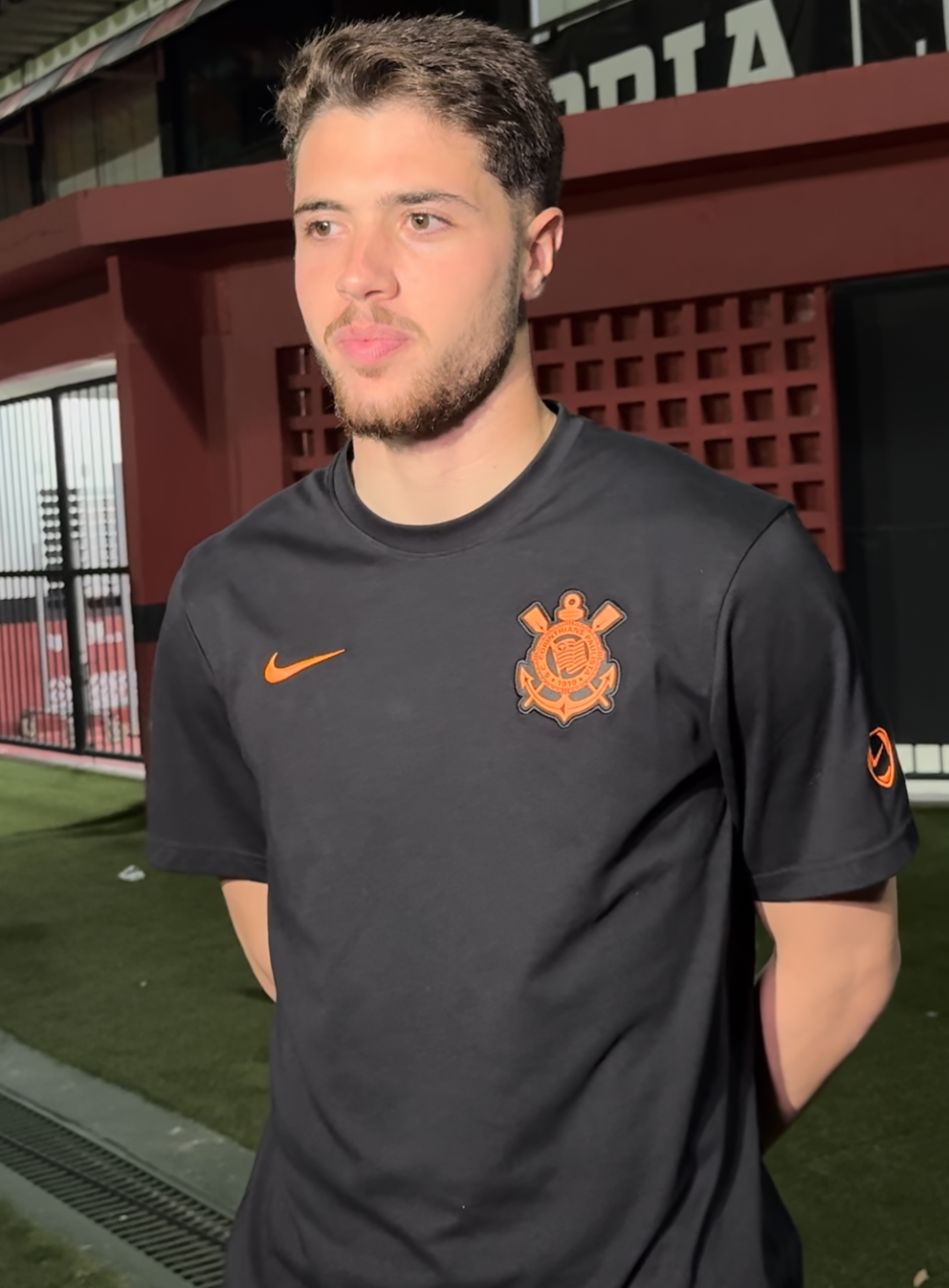

Personal information
- Full name: Felipe Longo Fernandes da Silva
- Date of birth: 5 March 2005 (age 21)
- Place of birth: São Paulo, Brazil
- Height: 1.89 m (6 ft 2 in)
- Position: Goalkeeper

Team information
- Current team: Corinthians
- Number: 40

Youth career
- 2013–2024: Corinthians

Senior career*
Years	Team	Apps	(Gls)
2024–	Corinthians	7	(0)

International career
2025–	Brazil U20	7	(0)
- * Club domestic league appearances and goals as of 05:16, 5 February 2026 (UTC)

Felipe Longo Fernandes da Silva (born 5 March 2005), known as Felipe Longo, is a Brazilian footballer who plays as a goalkeeper for Corinthians.

== Career ==
Born and raised in Tatuapé, a district of São Paulo, Felipe Longo joined the youth sides of Corinthians in 2013. On 7 October 2021, he signed his first professional contract with the club, agreeing to a deal until September 2024.

On 5 April 2024, shortly after helping the under-20s win the 2024 Copa São Paulo de Futebol Júnior, Felipe Longo renewed his link with Timão until March 2029; he was already promoted to the first team by head coach António Oliveira. Initially a fourth-choice behind Cássio, Carlos Miguel and Matheus Donelli, he became a backup to Donelli as the former two left, until the arrival of Hugo Souza.

Felipe Longo surpassed Donelli in the pecking order in June 2025, and made his senior debut on 16 October of that year, starting in a 3–1 Campeonato Brasileiro Série A away loss to Santos as Hugo Souza was away on international duty.

== Career statistics ==
As of match played 5 February 2026

Appearances and goals by club, season and competition
Club	Season	League			State League		Cup		Continental		Other		Total	
Club	Season	Division	Apps	Goals	Apps	Goals	Apps	Goals	Apps	Goals	Apps	Goals	Apps	Goals
Corinthians	2024	Série A	0	0	0	0	0	0	0	0	—		0	0
Corinthians	2025	Série A	6	0	0	0	0	0	0	0	—		6	0
Corinthians	2026	Série A	0	0	1	0	0	0	0	0	0	0	1	0
Career total			6	0	1	0	0	0	0	0	0	0	7	0

== Honours ==
Corinthians U20

- Copa São Paulo de Futebol Júnior: 2024

Corinthians

- Campeonato Paulista: 2025
- Copa do Brasil: 2025
- Supercopa do Brasil: 2026
