= Rafael Juninho =

Brazilian footballer (born 2006)

Personal information
- Full name: Rafael Batista da Silva Junior
- Date of birth: 2 July 2006 (age 20)
- Place of birth: Peruíbe, Brazil
- Height: 1.70 m (5 ft 7 in)
- Position: Winger

Team information
- Current team: IMT (on loan from Corinthians)
- Number: 11

Youth career
- Corinthians

Senior career*
| Years | Team | Apps | (Gls) |
| 2025– | Corinthians | 0 | (0) |
| 2025 | → Maxline Vitebsk (loan) | 29 | (4) |
| 2026– | → IMT (loan) | 6 | (1) |
- * Club domestic league appearances and goals as of 13 June 2026

Rafael Batista da Silva Junior (born 2 July 2006), known as Rafael Juninho, is a Brazilian professional footballer who plays as a winger for Serbian club IMT, on loan from Corinthians.

== Career ==
Born in Peruíbe, in the state of São Paulo, Juninho joined Corinthians youth setup in progressed through the club's various age-group sides. He signed his first amateur contract with the club, which ran until January 2024.

Juninho was one of the players selected by coach Guilherme Dalla Déa to compete in the Campeonato Paulista Sub-17 tournament. It was Juninho's first goal for Corinthians youth. Corinthians won the match 5–0 against Metropolitano-SP, Juninho unleashed a fine long-range strike from outside the box to score Corinthians fifth of the match.

Juninho was named in the 30-man squad selected by manager Danilo for the Copa São Paulo 2024.

== Career statistics ==
As of 21 May 2026

Appearances and goals by club, season and competition
| Club | Season | League | | | State League | | Cup | | Continental | | Other | | Total | |
| Club | Season | Division | Apps | Goals | Apps | Goals | Apps | Goals | Apps | Goals | Apps | Goals | Apps | Goals |
|---|---|---|---|---|---|---|---|---|---|---|---|---|---|---|
| Maxline Vitebsk (loan) | 2025 | Belarusian Premier League | 29 | 4 | — | | 2 | 0 | — | | — | | 31 | 4 |
| IMT | 2025–26 | Serbian SuperLiga | 5 | 1 | — | | — | | — | | — | | 5 | 1 |
| Career total | | | 34 | 5 | — | | 2 | 0 | — | | — | | 36 | 5 |

== Honours ==
Corinthians U20

- Copa São Paulo de Futebol Júnior: 2024

Corinthians U17

- Campeonato Paulista Sub-17: 2023

Maxline Vitebsk

- Belarusian Premier League: 2025
