= Clássico Alvinegro =

Football rivalry between Corinthians and Santos

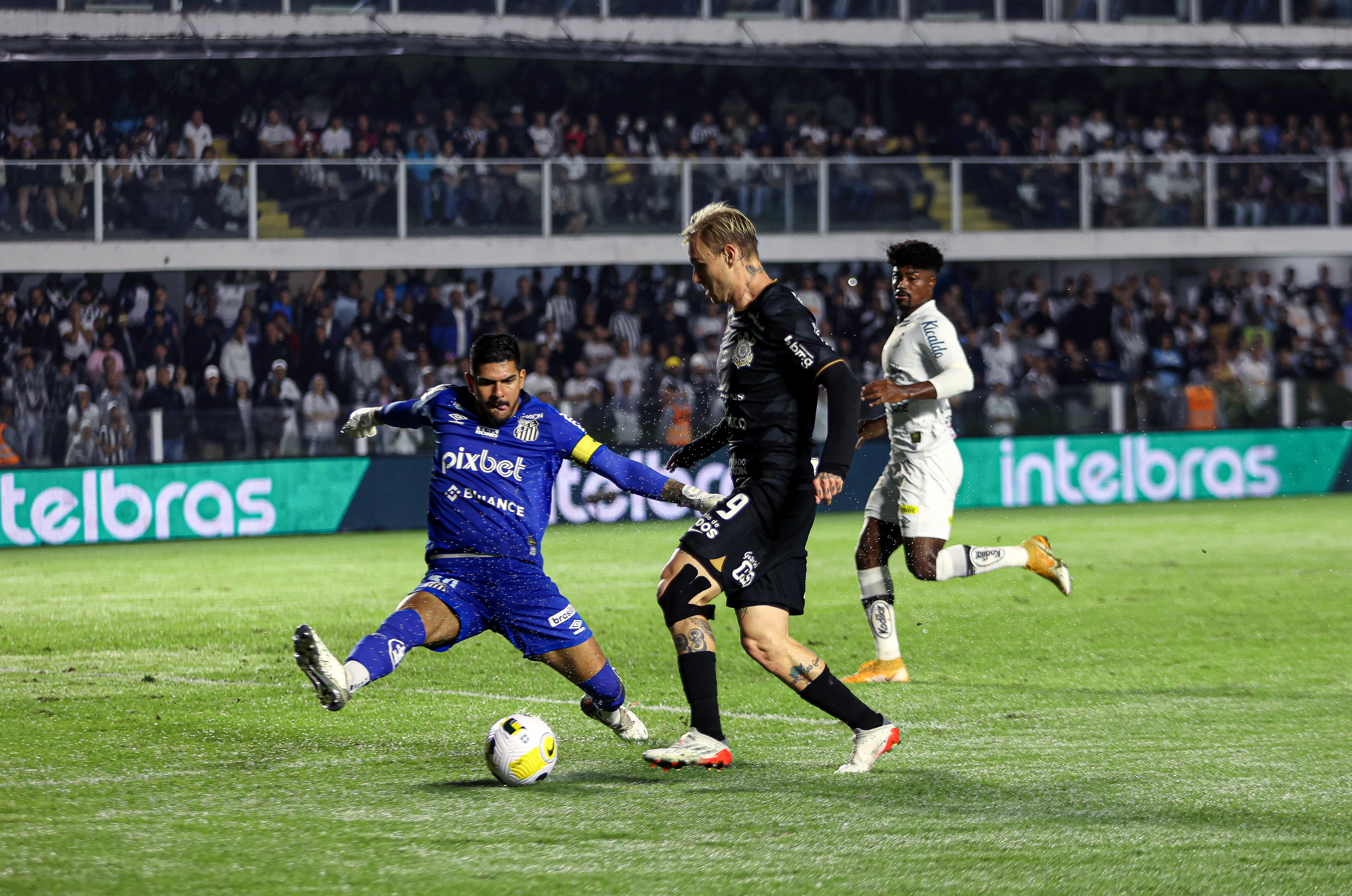
- Santos v Corinthians at the Vila Belmiro in 2022
- Location: State of São Paulo, Brazil
- Teams: Corinthians; Santos
- First meeting: 22 June 1913; Campeonato Paulista; Santos 6–3 Corinthians
- Latest meeting: 30 August 2026; Brazil Série A Corinthians 0–1 Santos

Statistics
- Total meetings: 358
- Most wins: Corinthians (140)
- Top scorer: Pelé (50 goals)
- All-time series: Corinthians: 140; Drawn: 104; Santos: 114
- Largest victory: Santos 0–11 Corinthians; 1920 Campeonato Paulista; 11 July 1920

Clássico Alvinegro (in English: Black & White derby) is the name of the football rivalry between Corinthians and Santos. Both are widely regarded as two of the biggest teams in the state of São Paulo, and also of Brazilian football.

The derby dates back from 1913, and since then, there has been pronounced tension between the clubs. They have also clashed in numerous decisive matches in major tournaments, being the finals of the 2002 Campeonato Brasileiro Serie A the most notable one. It is considered one of the biggest rivalries in the state of São Paulo.

== Statistics ==
=== Head-to-head record ===
Competition	Games	Corinthians wins	Draws	Santos wins
Copa Libertadores	2	1	1	0
Brazilian Championship	78	27	25	26
Brazil Cup	4	1	0	3
Rio–São Paulo Tournament	16	5	4	7
Paulista Championship (Note: In 1933, two matches were simultaneously valid for the Torneio Rio-São Paulo and for the Campeonato Paulista of that season. One of them was won by Santos by 6–0 and the other one ended in a 3–3 draw. In this table, those matches are only being considered as Torneio Rio-São Paulo games so they are not counted twice.)	208	87	58	63
Other	50	19	16	15
Total	358	140	104	114

Source: Futpedia

==== General ====
- 358 Matches
- 140 Wins – Corinthians
- 114 Wins – Santos
- 104 Draws
- Corinthians goals: 611
- Santos goals: 526
- Last match: Corinthians 0–1 Santos (Campeonato Brasileiro, 30 August 2026)

==== Campeonato Brasileiro ====
- 78 Matches
- 27 Wins – Corinthians
- 26 Wins – Santos
- 25 Draws
- Corinthians goals: 92
- Santos goals: 90
- Last match: Corinthians 0–1 Santos (30 August 2026)

==== Copa Libertadores ====
- 2 Matches
- 1 Win – Corinthians
- 0 Wins – Santos
- 1 Draws
- Corinthians goals: 2
- Santos goals: 1
- Last match: Corinthians 1–1 Santos (20 June 2012)

==== Copa do Brasil ====
- 4 Matches
- 1 Wins – Corinthians
- 3 Wins – Santos
- 0 Draws
- Corinthians goals: 5
- Santos goals: 5
- Last match: Santos 1–0 Corinthians (13 July 2022)

=== Largest victories ===
- Corinthians 5–0 Santos (21 September 1919) – Paulista League
- Santos 0–11 Corinthians (20 July 1920) – Paulista League
- Corinthians 6–1 Santos (5 June 1921) – Paulista League
- Corinthians 6–2 Santos (19 November 1922) – Paulista League
- Corinthians 6–1 Santos (8 June 1924) – Paulista League
- Santos 8–3 Corinthians (18 March 1927) – Paulista League
- Corinthians 6–2 Santos (4 January 1931) – Paulista League
- Santos 7–1 Corinthians (8 May 1932) – Paulista League
- Corinthians 0–6 Santos (24 September 1933) – Paulista League/Rio-São Paulo Tournament
- Corinthians 5–1 Santos (24 May 1936) – Paulista League
- Corinthians 7–0 Santos (1 June 1941) – Paulista League
- Corinthians 6–2 Santos (26 July 1942) – Paulista League
- Santos 6–1 Corinthians (7 December 1958) – Paulista League
- Santos 6–1 Corinthians (30 November 1960) – Paulista League
- Santos 6–1 Corinthians (16 August 1961) – Paulista League
- Santos 4–0 Corinthians (26 November 1972) – Campeonato Brasileiro
- Corinthians 4–0 Santos (29 May 1977) – Paulista League
- Corinthians 5–1 Santos (16 August 1987) – Paulista League
- Corinthians 4–0 Santos (20 February 1994) – Campeonato Brasileiro
- Corinthians 5–1 Santos (23 May 1999) – Paulista League
- Corinthians 5–1 Santos (19 March 2000) – Paulista League
- Corinthians 5–0 Santos (18 March 2001) – Paulista League
- Corinthians 7–1 Santos (6 November 2005) – Campeonato Brasileiro
- Santos 5–1 Corinthians (29 January 2014) – Paulista League
- Corinthians 4–0 Santos (22 June 2022) – Brazil Cup

=== Major finals between the clubs ===
Season	Competition	Date	Match	Score	Winner
2002	Brazilian Série A	8 December 2002	Santos – Corinthians	2–0	Santos
2002	Brazilian Série A	15 December 2002	Corinthians – Santos	2–3	Santos
2009	Campeonato Paulista	26 April 2009	Santos – Corinthians	1–3	Corinthians
2009	Campeonato Paulista	3 May 2009	Corinthians – Santos	1–1	Corinthians
2011	Campeonato Paulista	8 May 2011	Corinthians – Santos	0–0	Santos
2011	Campeonato Paulista	15 May 2011	Santos – Corinthians	2–1	Santos
2013	Campeonato Paulista	12 May 2013	Corinthians – Santos	2–1	Corinthians
2013	Campeonato Paulista	19 May 2013	Santos – Corinthians	1–1	Corinthians

- Finals won: Corinthians 2, Santos 2.

=== Honours ===
Competitions	Corinthians	Santos
Brazilian Championship	7	8
Brazil Cup	4	1
Brazil Supercup	2	-
Copa Libertadores	1	3
Recopa Sudamericana	1	1
Copa Conmebol	-	1
Intercontinental Champions' Supercup	-	1
FIFA Club World Cup/Intercontinental Cup	2	2
Total	17	17
Other Competitions	Corinthians	Santos
Rio–São Paulo	5	5
Paulista Championship	31	22
Copa Paulista	1	1
Brazilian Série B	1	1
Total General	55	46

Note (1): Although the Intercontinental Cup and the FIFA Club World Cup are officially different tournaments, in Brazil they are treated many times as the same tournament.

Note (2): Despite some sources says that they are two distinct titles, the Intercontinental Champions' Supercup and the Supercopa Sul-Americana dos Campeões Intercontinentais, the latter was just a phase of the Intercontinental Champions' Supercup. CONMEBOL recognizes only one title, the Intercontinental Champions' Supercup.
