= William Batista (football manager) =

Brazilian football coach

- Batista in 2026

Personal information
- Full name: William Batista de Almeida
- Date of birth: 13 May 1993 (age 33)
- Place of birth: Hortolândia, Brazil

Team information
- Current team: Corinthians U20 (head coach)

Youth career
- Years: Team
- Bragantino
- Red Bull Brasil
- Rio Ave

Managerial career
- 2013–2014: Sumaré U17 (assistant)
- 2015: Guarani U20 (assistant)
- 2016: Atibaia U15 (assistant)
- 2016: Atibaia U17
- 2018: Chapecoense U20 (assistant)
- 2019–2020: América Mineiro U15
- 2020–2022: América Mineiro U20
- 2023–2024: Vasco da Gama U20
- 2023: Vasco da Gama (interim)
- 2024: Vasco da Gama (interim)
- 2024: Red Bull Bragantino U20
- 2024: América Mineiro (assistant)
- 2025: América Mineiro
- 2025–: Corinthians U20
- 2026: Corinthians (interim)

William Batista de Almeida (born 13 May 1993) is a Brazilian football coach, currently the head coach of the under-20 team of Corinthians.

== Career ==
Born in Hortolândia, São Paulo, Batista played for Bragantino, Red Bull Brasil and Rio Ave before retiring at the age of 20 to pursue a coaching career. After working in the youth categories of Sumaré, Guarani and Atibaia, before becoming a coach of the latter's under-17 team in 2016, aged 23.

In 2019, after a period at Chapecoense, Batista became an under-15 coach at América Mineiro. On 13 October 2020, he was named in charge of the club's under-20 squad.

William left América on 14 November 2022, and was named head coach of Vasco da Gama's under-20 team eight days later. On 23 June of the following year, he was named interim head coach of the main squad, after Maurício Barbieri was sacked.

Batista was in charge of Vasco for three matches, becoming the club's youngest head coach in the century, before returning to his previous duties after the appointment of Ramón Díaz. He was also in charge of the first two matches of the 2024 Campeonato Carioca, as the first team was away on pre-season, but was sacked on 22 January of that year.

On 26 February 2024, Batista was appointed head coach of the under-20 team of Red Bull Bragantino. He left the side in August to return to América, as an assistant of Lisca.

On 6 December 2024, Batista was named head coach of América for the upcoming season. He led the club to the finals of the 2025 Campeonato Mineiro, but was sacked on 2 June 2025.

On 5 August 2025, Batista was announced as head coach of Corinthians' under-20 team. He was also an interim head coach in the main squad in October 2026, after Fernando Diniz was dismissed, and oversaw a 4–1 loss to rivals Palmeiras before returning to his under-20 role.
