= 2026 Supercopa do Brasil =

8th Supercopa do Brasil, annual football match

Flamengo	Corinthians
(Rio de Janeiro (state))	(São Paulo (state))
0	2
- Date: 1 February 2026
- Venue: Arena BRB Mané Garrincha, Brasília
- Man of the Match: Breno Bidon (Corinthians)
- Referee: Rafael Klein (Rio Grande do Sul)
- Attendance: 71,244
- Weather: Mostly Cloudy; 28 °C (82 °F); 51% humidity

The 2026 Supercopa do Brasil (officially the Supercopa Rei Superbet 2026 for sponsorship reasons) was the ninth edition of Supercopa do Brasil (also known as Supercopa Rei), an annual football match played between the champions of the Campeonato Brasileiro Série A and Copa do Brasil.

This edition featured Flamengo, champions of the 2025 Campeonato Brasileiro Série A, and Corinthians, champions of the 2025 Copa do Brasil. It was the second matchup between this two clubs in this competition, as Corinthians won their previous meeting in 1991. They also made their first appearance since that edition, as the tournament was not held between 1992 and 2019 (a period in which Corinthians won six league titles and three cup titles).

On 31 December 2025, the CBF announced that the tournament would take place on 1 February 2026 at the Arena BRB Mané Garrincha in Brasília.

Corinthians won the match 2–0, guaranteeing their second title of the competition.

== Qualified teams ==
Team	Qualification	Previous appearances (bold indicates winners)
(Rio de Janeiro (state)) Flamengo	2025 Campeonato Brasileiro Série A champions	6 (1991, **2020**, **2021**, 2022, 2023, **2025**)
(São Paulo (state)) Corinthians	2025 Copa do Brasil champions	1 (**1991**)

== Match ==
Saúl (Flamengo) missed the match due to injury.

Shortly before halftime, Jorge Carrascal (Flamengo) allegedly hit Breno Bidon (Corinthians) in the face with his elbow. Referee Rafael Klein only reviewed the incident when the teams returned from halftime, and Carrascal was sent off before the start of the second half.

=== Details ===
1 February 2026
16:00 UTC–3

Flamengo (Rio de Janeiro (state))	0–2	(São Paulo (state)) Corinthians
	Report	Gabriel Paulista 26'; Yuri Alberto 90+7'

Arena BRB Mané Garrincha, Brasília
Attendance: 71,244
Referee: Rafael Rodrigo Klein (Rio Grande do Sul)

**Flamengo**	**Corinthians**

GK	1	(Argentina) Agustín Rossi
RB	2	(Uruguay) Guillermo Varela
CB	3	(Brazil) Léo Ortiz
CB	4	(Brazil) Léo Pereira
LB	26	(Brazil) Alex Sandro		(substituted off) 80'
CM	5	(Chile) Erick Pulgar
CM	21	(Italy) Jorginho		(substituted off) 80'
RW	19	(Ecuador) Gonzalo Plata		(substituted off) 80'
AM	10	(Uruguay) Giorgian de Arrascaeta (c)		(substituted off) 68'
LW	15	(Colombia) Jorge Carrascal	(red card) 46'
CF	9	(Brazil) Pedro		(substituted off) 57'
Substitutes:
GK	42	(Brazil) Andrew
DF	6	(Brazil) Ayrton Lucas		(substituted on) 80'
DF	13	(Brazil) Danilo
DF	22	(Brazil) Emerson Royal
DF	44	(Brazil) Vitão
MF	18	(Uruguay) Nicolás de la Cruz		(substituted on) 80'
MF	20	(Brazil) Lucas Paquetá		(substituted on) 57'
MF	52	(Brazil) Evertton Araújo
FW	7	(Brazil) Luiz Araújo
FW	11	(Brazil) Everton		(substituted on) 80'
FW	16	(Brazil) Samuel Lino
FW	27	(Brazil) Bruno Henrique		(substituted on) 68'
Manager:
(Brazil) Filipe Luís

GK	1	(Brazil) Hugo Souza
RB	2	(Brazil) Matheuzinho
CB	13	(Brazil) Gustavo Henrique (c)
CB	3	(Brazil) Gabriel Paulista	(yellow card) 63'	(substituted off) 82'
LB	21	(Brazil) Matheus Bidu
DM	14	(Brazil) Raniele
CM	19	(Peru) André Carrillo		(substituted off) 60'
CM	49	(Brazil) André		(substituted off) 76'
AM	7	(Brazil) Breno Bidon	(yellow card) 43'	(substituted off) 82'
CF	9	(Brazil) Yuri Alberto
CF	10	(Netherlands) Memphis Depay	(yellow card) 54'	(substituted off) 76'
Substitutes:
GK	40	(Brazil) Felipe Longo
DF	5	(Brazil) André Ramalho		(substituted on) 82'
DF	20	(Uruguay) Pedro Milans
DF	25	(Brazil) Cacá
DF	46	(Brazil) Hugo
MF	8	(Argentina) Rodrigo Garro		(substituted on) 60'
MF	11	(Brazil) Vitinho
MF	23	(Brazil) Matheus Pereira	(yellow card) 90+3'	(substituted on) 76'
MF	35	(Brazil) Charles		(substituted on) 82'
FW	18	(Brazil) Pedro Raul
FW	37	(Brazil) Kaio César		(substituted on) 76'
FW	56	(Brazil) Gui Negão
Manager:
(Brazil) Dorival Júnior

Man of the Match:
(Brazil) Breno Bidon (Corinthians)

Assistant referees:
Bruno Boschilia (Paraná)
Rafael da Silva Alves (Rio Grande do Sul)
Fourth official:
Jonathan Benkenstein Pinheiro (Rio Grande do Sul)
Fifth official:
Leila Naiara Moreira da Cruz (Distrito Federal)
Video assistant referee:
Rodolpho Toski Marques (Paraná)
Assistant video assistant referees:
Cleriston Clay Barreto Rios (Sergipe)
Emerson de Almeida Ferreira (Minas Gerais)

**Match rules**

- 90 minutes.
- Penalty shoot-out if scores still level.
- Twelve named substitutes.
- Maximum of five substitutions.
