= 2019 South American U-20 Championship squads =

The 2019 South American U-20 Championship is an international association football tournament held in Chile. The ten national teams involved in the tournament were required to register a squad of 23 players; only players in these squads are eligible to take part in the tournament.
Each player had to have been born after 1 January 1999. All ages as of start of the tournament.

Players name marked in bold have been capped at full international level.

== Group A ==
=== Bolivia ===
Head coach: (Ecuador) Sixto Vizuete

The final squad was announced on 2 January 2019.

| No. | Pos. | Player | Date of birth (age) | Club |
|---|---|---|---|---|
| 1 | GK | Jairo Cuéllar | 15 October 1999 (aged 19) | (Bolivian Football Federation) Guabirá |
| 2 | DF | **Jairo Quinteros** | 7 February 2001 (aged 17) | (Royal Spanish Football Federation) Valencia Juvenil A |
| 3 | DF | Walter Antelo (captain) | 9 October 2000 (aged 18) | (Bolivian Football Federation) Sport Boys Warnes |
| 4 | DF | Alan Siles | 14 June 2000 (aged 18) | (Bolivian Football Federation) Blooming |
| 5 | DF | Luis Demiquel | 15 January 2000 (aged 19) | (Football Federation of Chile) Universidad de Chile |
| 6 | MF | **Daniel Rojas** | 22 February 2000 (aged 18) | (Bolivian Football Federation) Oriente Petrolero |
| 7 | MF | **Jhon García** | 13 April 2000 (aged 18) | (Football Federation of Chile) Deportes La Serena |
| 8 | MF | **Franz Gonzales** | 26 June 2000 (aged 18) | (Bolivian Football Federation) Sport Boys Warnes |
| 9 | FW | Sebastián Melgar | 16 July 2001 (aged 17) | (Argentine Football Association) Boca Juniors |
| 10 | MF | **Ramiro Vaca** | 1 July 1999 (aged 19) | (Bolivian Football Federation) The Strongest |
| 11 | FW | Erick Cano | 15 March 1999 (aged 19) | (Bolivian Football Federation) Bolívar |
| 12 | GK | Bruno Rivas | 22 August 2000 (aged 18) | (Bolivian Football Federation) Oriente Petrolero |
| 13 | MF | **Julio Herrera** | 11 February 1999 (aged 19) | (Bolivian Football Federation) Blooming |
| 14 | DF | Joel Fernández | 13 January 1999 (aged 20) | (Argentine Football Association) Boca Juniors |
| 15 | MF | Robin Canido | 25 March 1999 (aged 19) | (Bolivian Football Federation) Oriente Petrolero |
| 16 | DF | Emerson Velásquez | 24 February 1999 (aged 19) | (Bolivian Football Federation) Oriente Petrolero |
| 17 | FW | **César Menacho** | 9 August 1999 (aged 19) | (Bolivian Football Federation) Blooming |
| 18 | MF | **Adalid Terrazas** | 25 August 2000 (aged 18) | (Bolivian Football Federation) Tiquipaya |
| 19 | FW | Misael Cuéllar | 12 March 1999 (aged 19) | (Bolivian Football Federation) Academia Tahuichi Aguilera |
| 20 | FW | Roler Ferrufino | 10 October 2000 (aged 18) | (Bolivian Football Federation) Florida |
| 21 | DF | **Roberto Fernández** | 12 July 1999 (aged 19) | (Bolivian Football Federation) Blooming |
| 22 | GK | Mauricio Adorno | 3 April 2001 (aged 17) | (Bolivian Football Federation) Bata |
| 23 | DF | Robert Cueto | 27 May 1999 (aged 19) | (Bolivian Football Federation) Blooming |

=== Brazil ===
Head coach: Carlos Amadeu

The final squad was announced on 13 December 2018. Alan Souza withdrew injured and was replaced by Tetê on 5 January 2019.

| No. | Pos. | Player | Date of birth (age) | Club |
|---|---|---|---|---|
| 1 | GK | Gabriel Brazão | 5 October 2000 (aged 18) | (Brazilian Football Confederation) Cruzeiro |
| 2 | DF | **Emerson** | 14 January 1999 (aged 20) | (Brazilian Football Confederation) Atlético Mineiro |
| 3 | DF | Vitão (captain) | 2 February 2000 (aged 18) | (Brazilian Football Confederation) Palmeiras |
| 4 | DF | Matheus Thuler | 10 March 1999 (aged 19) | (Brazilian Football Confederation) Flamengo |
| 5 | MF | Luan | 14 May 1999 (aged 19) | (Brazilian Football Confederation) São Paulo |
| 6 | DF | **Carlos Augusto** | 7 January 1999 (aged 20) | (Brazilian Football Confederation) Corinthians |
| 7 | MF | Ramires | 10 August 2000 (aged 18) | (Brazilian Football Confederation) Bahia |
| 8 | MF | Marcos Bahia | 13 June 2000 (aged 18) | (Portuguese Football Federation) Estoril |
| 9 | FW | Lincoln | 16 December 2000 (aged 18) | (Brazilian Football Confederation) Flamengo |
| 10 | FW | **Rodrygo** | 9 January 2001 (aged 18) | (Brazilian Football Confederation) Santos |
| 11 | FW | Marquinhos Cipriano | 27 February 1999 (aged 19) | (Ukrainian Association of Football) Shakhtar Donetsk |
| 12 | GK | Phelipe Megiolaro | 8 February 1999 (aged 19) | (Brazilian Football Confederation) Grêmio |
| 13 | DF | **Vitinho** | 23 July 1999 (aged 19) | (Royal Belgian Football Association) Cercle Brugge |
| 14 | DF | Walce | 2 February 1999 (aged 19) | (Brazilian Football Confederation) São Paulo |
| 15 | DF | Lucas Ribeiro | 19 January 1999 (aged 19) | (Brazilian Football Confederation) Vitória |
| 16 | DF | Luan Cândido | 2 February 2001 (aged 17) | (Brazilian Football Confederation) Palmeiras |
| 17 | MF | Gabriel Furtado | 9 December 1999 (aged 19) | (Brazilian Football Confederation) Palmeiras |
| 18 | MF | Gabriel Menino | 29 September 2000 (aged 18) | (Brazilian Football Confederation) Palmeiras |
| 19 | FW | Rafael Papagaio | 4 December 1999 (aged 19) | (Brazilian Football Confederation) Palmeiras |
| 20 | MF | Igor Gomes | 17 March 1999 (aged 19) | (Brazilian Football Confederation) São Paulo |
| 21 | FW | Jonas Toró | 3 May 1999 (aged 19) | (Brazilian Football Confederation) São Paulo |
| 22 | GK | **Hugo Souza** | 31 January 1999 (aged 19) | (Brazilian Football Confederation) Flamengo |
| 23 | MF | Tetê | 15 February 2000 (aged 18) | (Brazilian Football Confederation) Grêmio |

=== Chile ===
Head coach: Héctor Robles

The final squad was announced on 21 December 2018. Nicolás Guerra withdrew injured and was replaced by Diego Valencia on 15 January 2019.

| No. | Pos. | Player | Date of birth (age) | Club |
|---|---|---|---|---|
| 1 | GK | Luis Ureta | 8 March 1999 (aged 19) | (Football Federation of Chile) O'Higgins |
| 2 | DF | **Nicolás Fernández** | 3 August 1999 (aged 19) | (Football Federation of Chile) Audax Italiano |
| 3 | DF | Lucas Alarcón | 5 March 2000 (aged 18) | (Football Federation of Chile) Universidad de Chile |
| 4 | DF | **Matías Ibacache** | 11 January 1999 (aged 20) | (Football Federation of Chile) Everton |
| 5 | DF | **Tomás Alarcón** | 19 January 1999 (aged 19) | (Football Federation of Chile) O'Higgins |
| 6 | MF | Axl Ríos | 11 July 1999 (aged 19) | (Football Federation of Chile) Cobreloa |
| 7 | FW | **Iván Morales** | 29 July 1999 (aged 19) | (Football Federation of Chile) Colo-Colo |
| 8 | MF | **Ariel Uribe** | 14 February 1999 (aged 19) | (Mexican Football Federation) Morelia |
| 9 | FW | **Diego Valencia** | 14 January 2000 (aged 19) | (Football Federation of Chile) Universidad Católica |
| 10 | MF | **Marcelo Allende** (captain) | 7 April 1999 (aged 19) | (Mexican Football Federation) Necaxa |
| 11 | MF | Matías Marín | 19 December 1999 (aged 19) | (Football Federation of Chile) Santiago Wanderers |
| 12 | GK | Julio Bórquez | 20 April 2000 (aged 18) | (Football Federation of Chile) Deportes Iquique |
| 13 | MF | **Víctor Méndez** | 23 September 1999 (aged 19) | (Football Federation of Chile) Unión Española |
| 14 | MF | Carlos Villanueva | 1 July 1999 (aged 19) | (Football Federation of Chile) Colo-Colo |
| 15 | DF | Esteban Valencia | 13 August 1999 (aged 19) | (Football Federation of Chile) Universidad de Chile |
| 16 | FW | Matías Meneses | 28 March 1999 (aged 19) | (Football Federation of Chile) O'Higgins |
| 17 | DF | Vicente Fernández | 17 February 1999 (aged 19) | (Football Federation of Chile) Universidad Católica |
| 18 | FW | Antonio Díaz | 26 April 2000 (aged 18) | (Football Federation of Chile) O'Higgins |
| 19 | FW | David Salazar | 19 April 1999 (aged 19) | (Football Federation of Chile) O'Higgins |
| 20 | MF | **Matías Sepúlveda** | 12 March 1999 (aged 19) | (Football Federation of Chile) O'Higgins |
| 21 | DF | Kennet Lara | 10 June 1999 (aged 19) | (Football Federation of Chile) Curicó Unido |
| 22 | DF | **Nicolás Díaz** | 20 May 1999 (aged 19) | (Football Federation of Chile) Palestino |
| 23 | GK | **Cristóbal Campos** | 27 August 1999 (aged 19) | (Football Federation of Chile) Universidad de Chile |

=== Colombia ===
Head coach: Arturo Reyes

The final squad was announced on 2 January 2019. Juan Sebastián Palma was ruled out after suffering an injury and was replaced by Klíver Moreno on 15 January 2019.

| No. | Pos. | Player | Date of birth (age) | Club |
|---|---|---|---|---|
| 1 | GK | Reinaldo Fontalvo | 8 January 1999 (aged 20) | (Colombian Football Federation) Barranquilla |
| 2 | DF | **Carlos Cuesta** (captain) | 9 March 1999 (aged 19) | (Colombian Football Federation) Atlético Nacional |
| 3 | DF | **Andrés Reyes** | 8 September 1999 (aged 19) | (Colombian Football Federation) Atlético Nacional |
| 4 | MF | Klíver Moreno | 9 August 2000 (aged 18) | (Colombian Football Federation) Millonarios |
| 5 | MF | Andrés Balanta | 18 January 2000 (aged 18) | (Colombian Football Federation) Deportivo Cali |
| 6 | MF | Yéiler Góez | 1 November 1999 (aged 19) | (Colombian Football Federation) Atlético Nacional |
| 7 | MF | Iván Angulo | 22 March 1999 (aged 19) | (Brazilian Football Confederation) Palmeiras |
| 8 | MF | Jaime Alvarado | 26 July 1999 (aged 19) | (The Football Association) Watford U-23 |
| 9 | FW | Rivaldo Correa | 7 September 1999 (aged 19) | (Colombian Football Federation) Independiente Medellín |
| 10 | MF | Yeison Tolosa | 12 June 1999 (aged 19) | (Colombian Football Federation) Deportivo Cali |
| 11 | MF | **Johan Carbonero** | 20 July 1999 (aged 19) | (Colombian Football Federation) Once Caldas |
| 12 | GK | **Kevin Mier** | 18 May 2000 (aged 18) | (Colombian Football Federation) Atlético Nacional |
| 13 | DF | Fabio Delgado | 28 May 1999 (aged 19) | (Colombian Football Federation) Cortuluá |
| 14 | FW | Jader Valencia | 15 November 1999 (aged 19) | (Colombian Football Federation) Millonarios |
| 15 | MF | Gustavo Carvajal | 17 June 2000 (aged 18) | (Colombian Football Federation) América |
| 16 | DF | **Brayan Vera** | 15 January 1999 (aged 20) | (Colombian Football Federation) Leones |
| 17 | FW | Dilan Ortiz | 15 March 2000 (aged 18) | (Colombian Football Federation) Real Cartagena |
| 18 | DF | Hayen Palacios | 8 September 1999 (aged 19) | (Colombian Football Federation) Atlético Nacional |
| 19 | FW | Luis Sandoval | 1 June 1999 (aged 19) | (Colombian Football Federation) Barranquilla |
| 20 | MF | José Enamorado | 13 January 1999 (aged 20) | (Colombian Football Federation) Orsomarso |
| 21 | DF | Jean Carlos Colorado | 11 September 2000 (aged 18) | (Colombian Football Federation) Cortuluá |
| 22 | GK | Juan David Lemus | 1 January 1999 (aged 20) | (Colombian Football Federation) Llaneros |
| 23 | DF | Carlos Romaña | 10 November 1999 (aged 19) | (Colombian Football Federation) Boyacá Chicó |

=== Venezuela ===
Head coach: Rafael Dudamel

The final squad was announced on 12 January 2019.

| No. | Pos. | Player | Date of birth (age) | Club |
|---|---|---|---|---|
| 1 | GK | Carlos Olses | 5 September 2000 (aged 18) | (Venezuelan Football Federation) Deportivo La Guaira |
| 2 | DF | Pablo Bonilla | 2 December 1999 (aged 19) | (Venezuelan Football Federation) Portuguesa |
| 3 | DF | **Miguel Navarro** | 26 February 1999 (aged 19) | (Venezuelan Football Federation) Deportivo La Guaira |
| 4 | DF | Junior Moreno | 3 March 2000 (aged 18) | (Venezuelan Football Federation) Trujillanos |
| 5 | MF | Luis Chiquillo | 2 January 1999 (aged 20) | (Venezuelan Football Federation) Monagas |
| 6 | DF | **Christian Makoun** (captain) | 5 March 2000 (aged 18) | (Italian Football Federation) Juventus Primavera |
| 7 | MF | Jesús Vargas | 26 August 1999 (aged 19) | (Venezuelan Football Federation) Estudiantes de Mérida |
| 8 | MF | Carlos Ramos | 26 May 1999 (aged 19) | (Venezuelan Football Federation) Carabobo |
| 9 | FW | **Jan Carlos Hurtado** | 5 March 2000 (aged 18) | (Argentine Football Association) Gimnasia y Esgrima |
| 10 | MF | **Samuel Sosa** | 17 December 1999 (aged 19) | (Argentine Football Association) Talleres |
| 11 | MF | Enrique Peña Zauner | 4 March 2000 (aged 18) | (German Football Association) Borussia Dortmund U-19 |
| 12 | GK | Miguel Silva | 9 July 2000 (aged 18) | (Venezuelan Football Federation) Metropolitanos |
| 13 | DF | Ricardo Mangana | 22 September 1999 (aged 19) | (Royal Spanish Football Federation) Celta de Vigo B |
| 14 | MF | Rommell Ibarra | 24 March 2000 (aged 18) | (Venezuelan Football Federation) Deportivo La Guaira |
| 15 | MF | **Jorge Yriarte** | 4 March 2000 (aged 18) | (Venezuelan Football Federation) Deportivo Lara |
| 16 | MF | Jorge Echeverría | 13 February 2000 (aged 18) | (Venezuelan Football Federation) Caracas |
| 17 | FW | Junior Paredes | 1 January 2001 (aged 18) | (Venezuelan Football Federation) Zulia |
| 18 | MF | Brayan Palmezano | 17 September 2000 (aged 18) | (Football Federation of Chile) Huachipato |
| 19 | FW | Santiago Herrera | 27 November 1999 (aged 19) | (United States Soccer Federation) UCLA Bruins |
| 20 | DF | Marco Gómez | 19 April 2000 (aged 18) | (Venezuelan Football Federation) Zulia |
| 21 | DF | Ignacio Anzola | 28 July 1999 (aged 19) | (Venezuelan Football Federation) Deportivo Lara |
| 22 | GK | **Cristopher Varela** | 27 November 1999 (aged 19) | (Venezuelan Football Federation) Deportivo Táchira |
| 23 | MF | **Cristian Cásseres** | 20 January 2000 (aged 18) | (United States Soccer Federation) New York Red Bulls |

== Group B ==
=== Argentina ===
Head coach: Fernando Batista

The final squad was announced on 22 December 2018. Ezequiel Barco and Agustín Almendra were ruled out after suffering injuries. They were replaced by Gonzalo Maroni and Julián López respectively.

| No. | Pos. | Player | Date of birth (age) | Club |
|---|---|---|---|---|
| 1 | GK | Manuel Roffo | 4 April 2000 (aged 18) | (Argentine Football Association) Boca Juniors |
| 2 | DF | **Nehuén Pérez** (captain) | 24 June 2000 (aged 18) | (Argentine Football Association) Argentinos Juniors |
| 3 | DF | Elías Pereyra | 15 February 1999 (aged 19) | (Argentine Football Association) San Lorenzo |
| 4 | DF | Facundo Mura | 23 March 1999 (aged 19) | (Argentine Football Association) Estudiantes |
| 5 | FW | Pedro De la Vega | 7 February 2001 (aged 17) | (Argentine Football Association) Lanús |
| 6 | DF | **Leonardo Balerdi** | 26 January 1999 (aged 19) | (German Football Association) Borussia Dortmund |
| 7 | MF | Francesco Lo Celso | 5 March 2000 (aged 18) | (Argentine Football Association) Rosario Central |
| 8 | MF | Julián López | 8 January 2000 (aged 19) | (Argentine Football Association) Racing |
| 9 | FW | Facundo Colidio | 4 January 2000 (aged 19) | (Italian Football Federation) Inter Primavera |
| 10 | MF | Gonzalo Maroni | 18 March 1999 (aged 19) | (Argentine Football Association) Talleres |
| 11 | MF | **Aníbal Moreno** | 13 May 1999 (aged 19) | (Argentine Football Association) Newell's Old Boys |
| 12 | GK | Lautaro Morales | 16 December 1999 (aged 19) | (Argentine Football Association) Lanús |
| 13 | DF | Aarón Barquett | 9 March 1999 (aged 19) | (Argentine Football Association) Argentinos Juniors |
| 14 | DF | **Facundo Medina** | 28 May 1999 (aged 19) | (Argentine Football Association) Talleres |
| 15 | MF | Fausto Vera | 26 March 2000 (aged 18) | (Argentine Football Association) Argentinos Juniors |
| 16 | MF | Santiago Sosa | 3 May 1999 (aged 19) | (Argentine Football Association) River Plate |
| 17 | MF | Francisco Ortega | 19 March 1999 (aged 19) | (Argentine Football Association) Vélez Sarsfield |
| 18 | FW | **Adolfo Gaich** | 26 February 1999 (aged 19) | (Argentine Football Association) San Lorenzo |
| 19 | FW | Maximiliano Romero | 9 January 1999 (aged 20) | (Royal Dutch Football Association) PSV Eindhoven |
| 20 | MF | **Thiago Almada** | 26 April 2001 (aged 17) | (Argentine Football Association) Vélez Sarsfield |
| 21 | MF | Manuel Insaurralde | 31 January 1999 (aged 19) | (Argentine Football Association) San Lorenzo |
| 22 | FW | **Julián Álvarez** | 31 January 2000 (aged 18) | (Argentine Football Association) River Plate |
| 23 | GK | Jerónimo Pourtau | 23 January 2000 (aged 18) | (Argentine Football Association) Estudiantes |

=== Ecuador ===
Head coach: (Argentina) Jorge Célico

The final squad was announced on 2 January 2019.

| No. | Pos. | Player | Date of birth (age) | Club |
|---|---|---|---|---|
| 1 | GK | **Moisés Ramírez** | 9 September 2000 (aged 18) | (Ecuadorian Football Federation) Independiente del Valle |
| 2 | DF | **Jackson Porozo** | 4 August 2000 (aged 18) | (Brazilian Football Confederation) Santos |
| 3 | DF | **Diego Palacios** | 12 July 1999 (aged 19) | (Royal Dutch Football Association) Willem II |
| 4 | DF | **Jhon Espinoza** (captain) | 24 February 1999 (aged 19) | (Ecuadorian Football Federation) Aucas |
| 5 | MF | **Jordy Alcívar** | 5 August 1999 (aged 19) | (Ecuadorian Football Federation) LDU Quito |
| 6 | DF | **Gustavo Vallecilla** | 28 May 1999 (aged 19) | (Ecuadorian Football Federation) Aucas |
| 7 | MF | Johao Chávez | 16 May 1999 (aged 19) | (Ecuadorian Football Federation) Independiente del Valle |
| 8 | MF | **José Cifuentes** | 12 March 1999 (aged 19) | (Ecuadorian Football Federation) América de Quito |
| 9 | FW | **Leonardo Campana** | 24 July 2000 (aged 18) | (Ecuadorian Football Federation) Barcelona |
| 10 | MF | Jordan Rezabala | 29 February 2000 (aged 18) | (Ecuadorian Football Federation) Independiente del Valle |
| 11 | FW | **Alexander Alvarado** | 21 April 1999 (aged 19) | (Ecuadorian Football Federation) Aucas |
| 12 | GK | Pierre Bellolio | 22 June 1999 (aged 19) | (Ecuadorian Football Federation) Universidad Católica |
| 13 | MF | George Pardo | 12 July 2000 (aged 18) | (Ecuadorian Football Federation) Orense |
| 14 | DF | Richard Mina | 22 July 1999 (aged 19) | (Ecuadorian Football Federation) Técnico Universitario |
| 15 | DF | Marlon Medranda | 19 May 1999 (aged 19) | (Ecuadorian Football Federation) Orense |
| 16 | MF | Sergio Quintero | 12 March 1999 (aged 19) | (Ecuadorian Football Federation) Imbabura |
| 17 | MF | Emerson Espinoza | 11 March 2001 (aged 17) | (Ecuadorian Football Federation) Independiente del Valle |
| 18 | DF | Joao Quiñónez | 15 May 1999 (aged 19) | (Ecuadorian Football Federation) Universidad Católica |
| 19 | FW | Daniel Segura | 17 March 1999 (aged 19) | (Ecuadorian Football Federation) Mushuc Runa |
| 20 | FW | **Gonzalo Plata** | 1 November 2000 (aged 18) | (Ecuadorian Football Federation) Independiente del Valle |
| 21 | FW | Santiago Micolta | 26 May 2000 (aged 18) | (Football Federation of Chile) Unión La Calera |
| 22 | GK | Jhon Jairo Camacho (until 1 February) | 31 March 1999 (aged 19) | (Ecuadorian Football Federation) Fuerza Amarilla |
| 22 | GK | Johan Lara (from 2 February) | 28 February 1999 (aged 19) | (Ecuadorian Football Federation) Aucas |
| 23 | FW | Alexander Bolaños | 12 December 1999 (aged 19) | (Football Federation of Chile) Colo-Colo |

=== Paraguay ===
Head coach: Gustavo Morínigo

The final squad was announced on 21 December 2018.

| No. | Pos. | Player | Date of birth (age) | Club |
|---|---|---|---|---|
| 1 | GK | José Miers | 7 December 2000 (aged 18) | (Paraguayan Football Association) Cerro Porteño |
| 2 | DF | Cristhian Candia | 7 March 1999 (aged 19) | (Paraguayan Football Association) Libertad |
| 3 | DF | Roberto Fernández (captain) | 7 June 2000 (aged 18) | (Paraguayan Football Association) Guaraní |
| 4 | DF | Pedro Álvarez | 10 February 2001 (aged 17) | (Paraguayan Football Association) Cerro Porteño |
| 5 | DF | **Alexis Duarte** | 12 March 2000 (aged 18) | (Paraguayan Football Association) Cerro Porteño |
| 6 | MF | Marcelino Ñamandú | 28 July 1999 (aged 19) | (Paraguayan Football Association) Cerro Porteño |
| 7 | FW | Antonio Galeano | 22 March 2000 (aged 18) | (Brazilian Football Confederation) São Paulo |
| 8 | MF | **Braian Ojeda** | 27 June 2000 (aged 18) | (Paraguayan Football Association) Olimpia |
| 9 | FW | Fernando Romero | 24 April 2000 (aged 18) | (Paraguayan Football Association) Nacional |
| 10 | MF | **Iván Franco** | 16 April 2000 (aged 18) | (Paraguayan Football Association) Libertad |
| 11 | FW | Antonio Marín | 21 July 1999 (aged 19) | (Paraguayan Football Association) Guaraní |
| 12 | GK | Diego Huesca | 8 August 2000 (aged 18) | (Royal Spanish Football Federation) Valencia Juvenil A |
| 13 | DF | Alexis Sosa | 30 April 2000 (aged 18) | (Paraguayan Football Association) Libertad |
| 14 | DF | Marcelo Rolón | 19 February 2000 (aged 18) | (Paraguayan Football Association) Libertad |
| 15 | MF | Hugo Quintana | 10 November 2001 (aged 17) | (Paraguayan Football Association) Olimpia |
| 16 | FW | Aníbal Vega | 18 March 2000 (aged 18) | (Brazilian Football Confederation) Palmeiras |
| 17 | MF | Fernando Cardozo | 8 February 2001 (aged 17) | (Paraguayan Football Association) Olimpia |
| 18 | FW | Blas Armoa | 3 February 2000 (aged 18) | (Paraguayan Football Association) Sportivo Luqueño |
| 19 | MF | Lucas Sanabria | 13 September 1999 (aged 19) | (Paraguayan Football Association) Libertad |
| 20 | DF | Aldo Zárate | 7 August 2001 (aged 17) | (Paraguayan Football Association) Libertad |
| 21 | MF | Alan Rodríguez | 15 August 2000 (aged 18) | (Paraguayan Football Association) Cerro Porteño |
| 22 | FW | Rodrigo Ruíz Díaz | 15 January 1999 (aged 20) | (Paraguayan Football Association) Sol de América |
| 23 | GK | **Orlando Gill** | 11 June 2000 (aged 18) | (Paraguayan Football Association) Sportivo San Lorenzo |

=== Peru ===
Head coach: (Argentina) Daniel Ahmed

The final squad was announced on 12 January 2019.

| No. | Pos. | Player | Date of birth (age) | Club |
|---|---|---|---|---|
| 1 | GK | Jeremy Aguirre | 1 January 1999 (aged 20) | (Peruvian Football Federation) Sport Boys |
| 2 | DF | Marco Saravia | 6 February 1999 (aged 19) | (Peruvian Football Federation) Deportivo Municipal |
| 3 | DF | Brayan Velarde | 18 February 1999 (aged 19) | (Peruvian Football Federation) Universitario |
| 4 | DF | Alec Deneumostier | 5 May 1999 (aged 19) | (Peruvian Football Federation) Melgar |
| 5 | DF | Carlos Huerto | 26 April 1999 (aged 19) | (Peruvian Football Federation) Universidad de San Martín |
| 6 | MF | **Jesús Pretell** | 26 March 1999 (aged 19) | (Peruvian Football Federation) Universidad de San Martín |
| 7 | MF | **Gerald Távara** | 25 March 1999 (aged 19) | (Peruvian Football Federation) Sporting Cristal |
| 8 | MF | **Jairo Concha** | 27 May 1999 (aged 19) | (Peruvian Football Federation) Universidad de San Martín |
| 9 | FW | Sebastián Gonzales | 6 December 1999 (aged 19) | (Peruvian Football Federation) Sport Boys |
| 10 | FW | Fernando Pacheco | 26 June 1999 (aged 19) | (Peruvian Football Federation) Sporting Cristal |
| 11 | FW | José Bolívar | 17 January 2000 (aged 19) | (Peruvian Football Federation) Universidad de San Martín |
| 12 | GK | Emile Franco | 11 March 2000 (aged 18) | (Peruvian Football Federation) Sporting Cristal |
| 13 | DF | Dylan Caro | 23 March 1999 (aged 19) | (Peruvian Football Federation) Unión Huaral |
| 14 | FW | Christopher Olivares | 3 April 1999 (aged 19) | (Peruvian Football Federation) Sporting Cristal |
| 15 | MF | **Oslimg Mora** | 2 June 1999 (aged 19) | (Peruvian Football Federation) Alianza Lima |
| 16 | DF | Renato Rojas (captain) | 4 August 1999 (aged 19) | (Peruvian Football Federation) Alianza Lima |
| 17 | DF | Franco Medina | 18 July 1999 (aged 19) | (Peruvian Football Federation) Alianza Lima |
| 18 | DF | Jonathan Bilbao | 29 July 1999 (aged 19) | (Peruvian Football Federation) Universidad de San Martín |
| 19 | DF | Alessandro Milesi | 21 December 1999 (aged 19) | (Italian Football Federation) Brescia Primavera |
| 20 | MF | **Marcos López** | 20 November 1999 (aged 19) | (United States Soccer Federation) San Jose Earthquakes |
| 21 | GK | Diego Romero | 17 August 2001 (aged 17) | (Peruvian Football Federation) Universitario |
| 22 | DF | José Zevallos | 13 January 1999 (aged 20) | (Peruvian Football Federation) Universitario |
| 23 | MF | Walter Tandazo | 14 June 2000 (aged 18) | (Peruvian Football Federation) Melgar |

=== Uruguay ===
Head coach: Fabián Coito

The final squad was announced on 19 December 2018.

| No. | Pos. | Player | Date of birth (age) | Club |
|---|---|---|---|---|
| 1 | GK | **Franco Israel** | 22 April 2000 (aged 18) | (Italian Football Federation) Juventus Primavera |
| 2 | DF | **Bruno Méndez** (captain) | 10 September 1999 (aged 19) | (Uruguayan Football Association) Montevideo Wanderers |
| 3 | DF | **Sebastián Cáceres** | 18 August 1999 (aged 19) | (Uruguayan Football Association) Liverpool |
| 4 | DF | Ezequiel Busquets | 24 October 2000 (aged 18) | (Uruguayan Football Association) Peñarol |
| 5 | MF | Martín Barrios | 24 January 1999 (aged 19) | (Uruguayan Football Association) Racing |
| 6 | DF | **Maximiliano Araújo** | 15 February 2000 (aged 18) | (Uruguayan Football Association) Montevideo Wanderers |
| 7 | FW | Emiliano Gómez | 18 September 2001 (aged 17) | (Uruguayan Football Association) Defensor Sporting |
| 8 | MF | **Rodrigo Zalazar** | 12 August 1999 (aged 19) | (Royal Spanish Football Federation) Atlético Malagueño |
| 9 | FW | Facundo Batista | 16 January 1999 (aged 20) | (Swiss Football Association) Chiasso |
| 10 | FW | Nicolás Schiappacasse | 12 January 1999 (aged 20) | (Royal Spanish Football Federation) Atlético Madrid B |
| 11 | MF | Pablo García | 15 April 1999 (aged 19) | (Argentine Football Association) River Plate |
| 12 | GK | Renzo Rodríguez | 23 January 1999 (aged 19) | (Argentine Football Association) Independiente |
| 13 | DF | Emiliano Ancheta | 9 June 1999 (aged 19) | (Uruguayan Football Association) Danubio |
| 14 | MF | Erik de los Santos | 16 January 1999 (aged 20) | (Uruguayan Football Association) Peñarol |
| 15 | DF | Edgar Elizalde | 27 February 2000 (aged 18) | (Italian Football Federation) Pescara |
| 16 | MF | Nicolás Acevedo | 14 April 1999 (aged 19) | (Uruguayan Football Association) Liverpool |
| 17 | FW | Agustín Dávila | 5 January 1999 (aged 20) | (Royal Spanish Football Federation) Real Sociedad B |
| 18 | MF | **Juan Manuel Sanabria** | 29 March 2000 (aged 18) | (Royal Spanish Football Federation) Atlético Madrid Juvenil A |
| 19 | FW | **Darwin Núñez** | 24 June 1999 (aged 19) | (Uruguayan Football Association) Peñarol |
| 20 | FW | Juan Manuel Boselli | 9 November 1999 (aged 19) | (Uruguayan Football Association) Defensor Sporting |
| 21 | MF | Thomás Chacón | 17 August 2000 (aged 18) | (Uruguayan Football Association) Danubio |
| 22 | DF | Mathías Laborda | 15 September 1999 (aged 19) | (Uruguayan Football Association) Nacional |
| 23 | GK | Mauro Silveira | 6 May 2000 (aged 18) | (Uruguayan Football Association) Montevideo Wanderers |
