= Neneca =

Neneca is a common nickname in Brazil, and may refer to:

- Neneca (footballer, 1947-2015), Hélio Miguel, Brazilian football goalkeeper
- Welesley Neneca (born 1967), Welesley Antonio Simplicio, Brazilian football manager and former goalkeeper
- Neneca (footballer, born 1980), Anderson Soares da Silva, Brazilian football goalkeeper
- Neneca (volleyball) (born 1988), Alessandra Januário dos Santos, Brazilian volleyball player
- Neneca (footballer, born 1999), Hugo de Souza Nogueira, Brazilian football goalkeeper for Corinthians
- Neneca (footballer, born 2003), Hélio Miguel Júnior, Brazilian football goalkeeper for Santa Clara, and son of same name footballer born 1947
