= Anderson Silva (disambiguation) =

Anderson Silva (born 1975) is a Brazilian mixed martial artist.

Anderson Silva may also refer to:

- Anderson Silva (kickboxer) (born 1986), Brazilian kickboxer and mixed martial artist
- Anderson Silva (footballer) (born 1997), Brazilian footballer

== See also ==
- Anderson da Silva (disambiguation)
- Anderson Soares da Silva (disambiguation)
