= Anderson da Silva =

Anderson da Silva may refer to:

- Anderson da Silva (footballer, born 1975), Brazilian football defender
- Anderson da Silva (footballer, born 1980), Brazilian football midfielder
- Anderson de Silva (footballer, born 1982), Brazilian football midfielder

== See also ==
- Anderson Silva (disambiguation)
- Anderson Soares da Silva (disambiguation)
- Sonny Anderson (born 1970), full name Anderson da Silva, Brazilian football striker
