= Neneca (footballer, born 1947) =

Brazilian footballer

Personal information
- Full name: Hélio Miguel
- Date of birth: 18 December 1947
- Place of birth: Londrina, Brazil
- Date of death: 25 January 2015 (aged 67)
- Place of death: Londrina, Brazil
- Position: Goalkeeper

Youth career
- São Paulo (Londrina)

Senior career*
Years	Team	Apps	(Gls)
1966–1968	São Paulo (Londrina)		
1968	Paraná EC		
1969–1972	Londrina		
1973	América Mineiro		
1974–1975	Náutico		
1976–1980	Guarani		
1981	Operário-MS		
1981–1984	Londrina		
1984–1985	Bragantino		
1985–1986	Fluminense de Feira		
1986	AA Votuporanguense		
1987–1989	Londrina		
- * Club domestic league appearances and goals as of 25 May 2024

Hélio Miguel (18 December 1947 – 25 January 2015), better known by the nickname Neneca, was a Brazilian professional footballer who played as a goalkeeper.

== Career ==
Neneca is remembered for being Guarani FC's starter in the 1978 Campeonato Brasileiro Série A. He stood out for his excellent ability with the ball at his feet, something rare for goalkeepers at that time, having made the long pass that ended in an iconic goal by Careca. He also won a state title with Náutico, where in 1974, he became known nationally for completing 1,636 minutes, more than 18 matches, without conceding a goal, and another with Londrina in 1981, where he later worked as a coach. He inspired the nickname "Neneca" in several other goalkeepers, especially black ones, such as Anderson Soares da Silva and Hugo Souza.

== Personal life ==
His son, Hélio Miguel Júnior, who also uses the nickname "Neneca", is a goalkeeper in the youth categories of Londrina EC and currently plays for FC Cascavel.

== Honours ==
Náutico

- Campeonato Pernambucano: 1974

Guarani

- Campeonato Brasileiro: 1978

Londrina

- Campeonato Paranaense: 1981

== Death ==
Neneca died in Londrina, 25 January 2015, aged 67, due to advancing bone cancer.
