= Hugo Souza =

Brazilian footballer (born 1999)

- Hugo Souza in 2025

Personal information
- Full name: Hugo de Souza Nogueira
- Date of birth: 31 January 1999 (age 27)
- Place of birth: Duque de Caxias, Rio de Janeiro, Brazil
- Height: 1.96 m (6 ft 5 in)
- Position: Goalkeeper

Team information
- Current team: Corinthians
- Number: 1

Youth career
- 2014–2019: Flamengo

Senior career*
Years	Team	Apps	(Gls)
2018–2024	Flamengo	61	(0)
2023–2024	→ Chaves (loan)	26	(0)
2024	→ Corinthians (loan)	22	(0)
2025–	Corinthians	78	(0)

International career^{‡}
2025–	Brazil	2	(0)
- * Club domestic league appearances and goals as of 18 November 2026 ‡ National team caps and goals as of 25 September 2026

Hugo de Souza Nogueira (born 31 January 1999), known as Hugo Souza (Brazilian Portuguese: [ˈuɡu ˈsowzɐ]), is a Brazilian footballer who currently plays as a goalkeeper for Corinthians and the Brazil national team. He is sometimes nicknamed Neneca in tribute to the late Guarani goalkeeper Hélio Miguel.

== Club career ==
=== Early career ===
Hugo Souza training with Flamengo in 2017

Hugo, born in the city of Duque de Caxias, joined the Flamengo youth academy in 2009 at the age of ten. With the youth squad he won two Copa São Paulo de Futebol Júnior in 2016 and 2018.

=== Flamengo ===
On 27 September 2020, Hugo made his professional debut in a 1–1 draw between Flamengo and Palmeiras. He was selected as the Man of the Match.

On 12 January 2023, Hugo Souza transferred to Vissel Kobe for a transfer fee of €1.2 million, with Flamengo retaining 50% of any future transfer. However, two days later, Hugo withdrew from the transfer, citing personal problems.

==== Chaves (loan) ====
On 2 July 2023, Hugo Souza moved on a one-year loan to Primeira Liga club Chaves.

=== Corinthians ===
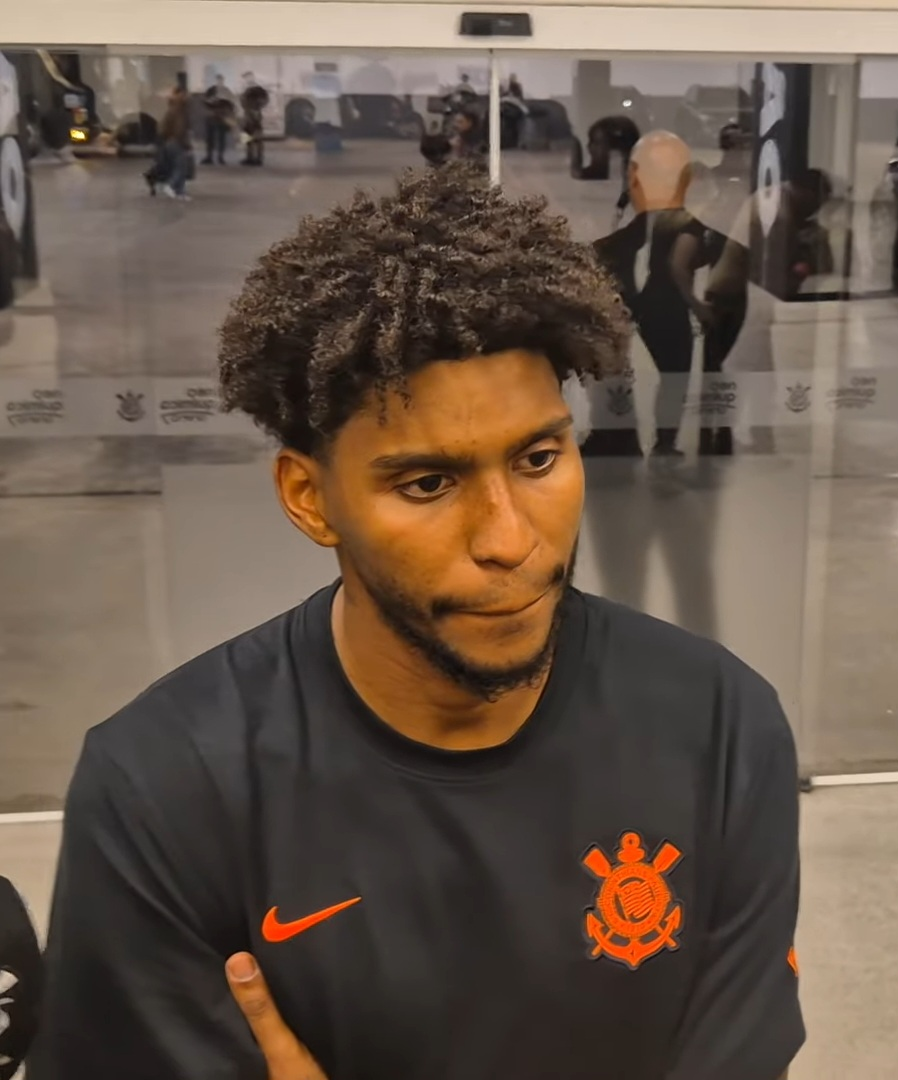
Hugo Souza with Corinthians in 2025

On 26 November 2024, Hugo transferred to Corinthians on a four-year contract, for a transfer fee of €800 thousand, after a four month loan.

== International career ==
On 17 August 2018, Brazil national team manager Tite included Hugo in the 23-man roster for a pair of friendlies against the United States and El Salvador. However, he did not feature in either match.

On 13 December 2018, Hugo was called up to the 2019 South American U-20 Championship squad for Brazil. Despite being part of the team, he did not play in any matches during the tournament.

On 26 May 2025, he returned to the Canarinho in Carlo Ancelotti's first call-up as coach of Brazil, ahead of the 2026 World Cup qualification matches against Ecuador and Paraguay. He was called up again for the last qualification matches against Chile and Bolivia, but didn't play either. He received his first cap in a 14 October friendly against Japan in Tokyo, which ended in a 3-2 defeat, Brazil's first ever against the Japanese. While the first two goals were attributed to mistakes committed by Fabrício Bruno, some blamed Souza for the third one, since he deflected a header by Ayase Ueda into his own net. Coincidentally, the last time a Corinthians goalkeeper played for Brazil was also in a friendly against Japan, when Cássio came in as a substitute in November 2017.

Souza was ultimately left out of Ancelotti's final squad for the World Cup, which included Alisson, Ederson and Weverton, the latter of which was considered more experienced.

== Career statistics ==
=== Club ===
As of match played 18 November 2026

Appearances and goals by club, season and competition
Club	Season	League			State league (Note: Includes Campeonato Carioca, Campeonato Paulista)		National cup (Note: Includes Copa do Brasil)		Continental		Other		Total	
Club	Season	Division	Apps	Goals	Apps	Goals	Apps	Goals	Apps	Goals	Apps	Goals	Apps	Goals
Flamengo	2020	Série A	23	0	—		3	0	1 (Note: Appearance(s) in Copa Libertadores)	0	—		27	0
Flamengo	2021	Série A	8	0	4	0	—		1	0	—		13	0
Flamengo	2022	Série A	15	0	11	0	1	0	3	0	1 (Note: Appearance in Supercopa do Brasil)	0	31	0
Flamengo	Total		46	0	15	0	4	0	5	0	1	0	71	0
Chaves (loan)	2023–24	Primeira Liga	26	0	—		—		—		1 (Note: Appearance in Taça da Liga)	0	27	0
Corinthians (loan)	2024	Série A	22	0	—		6	0	6 (Note: Appearances in Copa Sudamericana)	0	—		34	0
Corinthians	2025	Série A	26	0	12	0	10	0	8 (Note: Four appearances in Copa Libertadores, four appearances in Copa Sudamericana)	0	—		56	0
Corinthians	2026	Série A	31	0	9	0	3	0	10 (Note: Appearances in Copa Libertadores)	0	1	0	54	0
Corinthians	Total		79	0	21	0	19	0	24	0	1	0	144	0
Career total			151	0	36	0	23	0	29	0	3	0	242	0

=== International ===
As of 25 September 2026

Appearances and goals by national team and year
National team	Year	Apps	Goals
Brazil	2025	1	0
Brazil	2026	1	0
Total		2	0

== Honours ==
Flamengo

- Copa Libertadores: 2022
- Campeonato Brasileiro Série A: 2019, 2020
- Supercopa do Brasil: 2020, 2021
- Copa do Brasil: 2022
- Campeonato Carioca: 2019, 2020, 2021

Corinthians

- Copa do Brasil: 2025
- Campeonato Paulista: 2025
- Supercopa do Brasil: 2026

Individual

- Troféu Mesa Redonda Team of the Year: 2024, 2025
