= Yeison Tolosa =

Colombian footballer (born 1999)

Personal information
- Full name: Yeison Andrés Tolosa Castro
- Date of birth: June 12, 1999 (age 27)
- Place of birth: Cali, Colombia
- Position: Forward

Team information
- Current team: Atlético Bucaramanga (on loan from Deportivo Cali)
- Number: 15

Youth career
- Deportivo Cali

Senior career*
Years	Team	Apps	(Gls)
2018–	Deportivo Cali	10	(0)
2020–	→ Atlético Bucaramanga (loan)	2	(0)

International career^{‡}
2018	Colombia U21	4	(0)
2019–	Colombia U20	8	(0)
- * Club domestic league appearances and goals as of 20:17, 9 June 2020 (UTC) ‡ National team caps and goals as of 20:17, 9 June 2020 (UTC)

Yeison Tolosa (born 12 June 1999) is a Colombian football player who plays as forward for Deportivo Cali in Categoría Primera A.
