= Kennet Lara =

Chilean association football player (1999-)

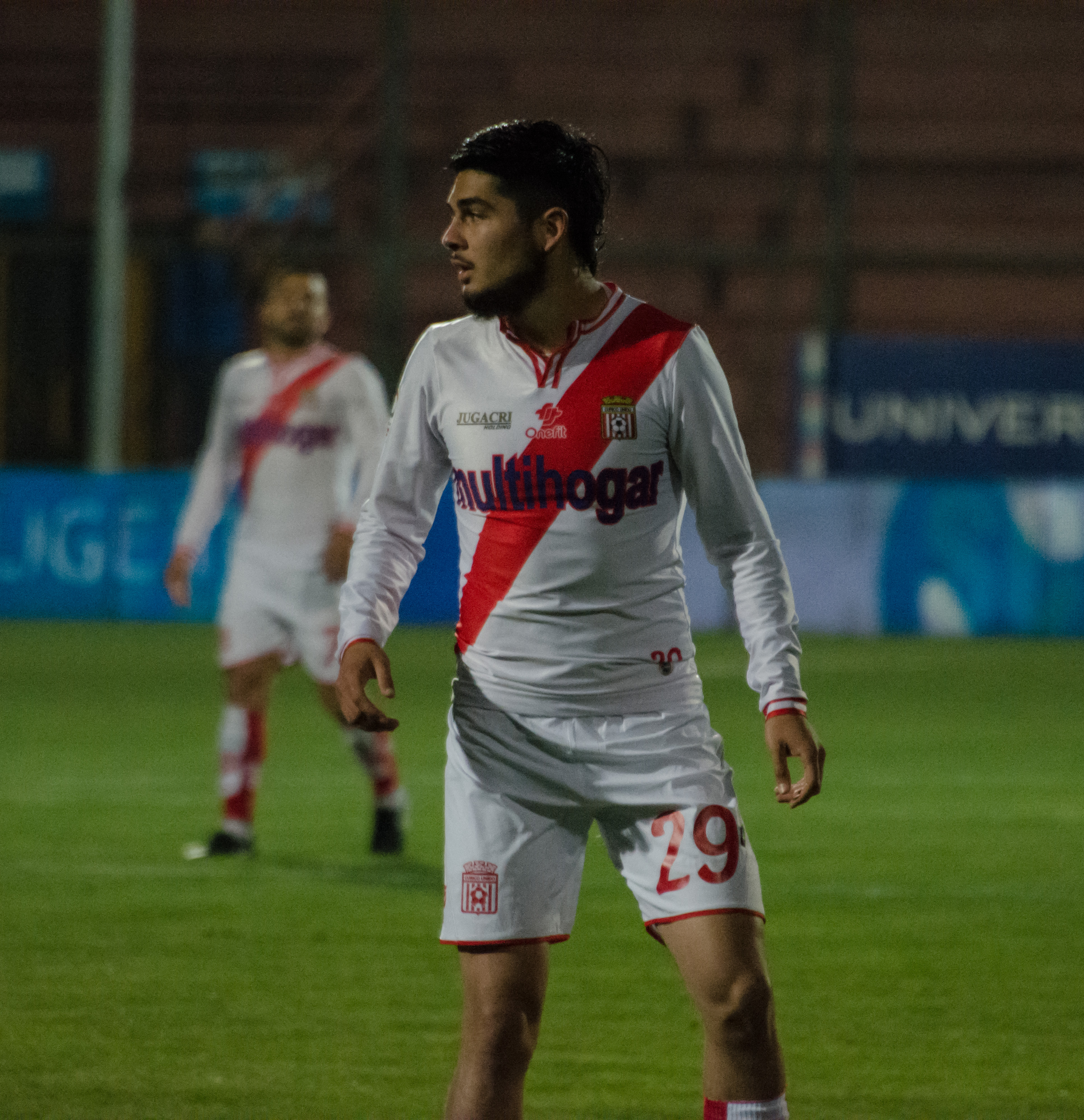

Personal information
- Full name: Kennet Michel Lara Arbunic
- Date of birth: 10 June 1999 (age 27)
- Place of birth: Santiago, Chile
- Height: 1.82 m (6 ft 0 in)
- Position: Defender

Team information
- Current team: Curicó Unido
- Number: 23

Youth career
- Curicó Unido

Senior career*
Years	Team	Apps	(Gls)
2018–	Curicó Unido	27	(3)
2022	→ A.C. Barnechea (loan)	17	(2)

International career^{‡}
2019	Chile U20	1	(0)
- * Club domestic league appearances and goals as of 17 January 2019 ‡ National team caps and goals as of 9 February 2019

Kennet Lara (born 10 June 1999) is a Chilean football player who plays as defender for Curicó Unido in Chilean Primera División.
