= Alex Ibacache =

Chilean footballer (born 1999)

Personal information
- Full name: Alex Matías Ibacache Mora
- Date of birth: 11 January 1999 (age 27)
- Place of birth: Quillota, Chile
- Height: 1.80 m (5 ft 11 in)
- Position: Left-back

Team information
- Current team: Deportes Antofagasta

Youth career
- Everton

Senior career*
Years	Team	Apps	(Gls)
2018–2023	Everton	60	(0)
2019	→ Cobreloa (loan)	4	(1)
2020–2021	→ Curicó Unido (loan)	23	(1)
2023	→ San Lorenzo (loan)	0	(0)
2023–2026	Belgrano	36	(0)
2024–2025	→ Everton (loan)	32	(1)
2026–	Deportes Antofagasta	0	(0)

International career^{‡}
2018–2019	Chile U20	8	(0)
2019	Chile U23	4	(0)
2022–	Chile	1	(0)
Medal record
Men's football
Representing Chile
South American Games
Gold medal – first place	2018 Cochabamba
- * Club domestic league appearances and goals as of 28 December 2025 ‡ National team caps and goals as of 31 May 2022

Alex Matías Ibacache Mora (born 11 January 1999) is a Chilean footballer who plays as left back for Deportes Antofagasta.

== Club career ==
In 2023, Ibacache joined Argentine side San Lorenzo on loan from Everton on a deal for one year with an option to buy. After issues with San Lorenzo, he ended his contract with both them and Everton and joined Belgrano on a deal until December 2025. In August 2024, he returned to Everton on loan. Back to Belgrano, he ended his contract in February 2026.

In March 2026, Ibacache signed with Deportes Antofagasta in the Primera B de Chile.

== International career ==
At under-20 level, Ibacache represented Chile in both the 2018 South American Games, winning the gold medal, and the 2019 South American Championship.

== Personal life ==
His brother, Lucas Andrés, is a footballer from the San Luis de Quillota youth system who emigrated to Albania joining KF Butrinti in 2023 and KF Maliqi in 2024.

== Career statistics ==
=== Club ===
As of 9 September 2020

Club	Season	League			Cup		Continental		Other		Total	
Club	Season	Division	Apps	Goals	Apps	Goals	Apps	Goals	Apps	Goals	Apps	Goals
Everton	2018	Primera; División	8	0	2	0	0	0	0	0	10	0
Everton	2019	Primera; División	12	0	1	0	0	0	0	0	13	0
Everton	Total		20	0	3	0	0	0	0	0	23	0
Cobreloa (loan)	2019	Primera; B	4	1	0	0	0	0	0	0	4	1
Curicó Unido (loan)	2020	Primera; División	5	0	0	0	0	0	0	0	5	0
Total career			29	1	3 (Note: Appearances in the Copa Chile)	0	0	0	0	0	32	1

=== International ===
As of match played 30 January 2020

Appearances and goals by national team and year
National team	Year	Competition	Apps	Goals
Chile U20	2019	U20 South American Championship	3	0
Chile U23	2019	Maurice Revello Tournament	2	0
Chile U23	2019	Friendlies	1	0
Chile U23	2020	Pre-Olympic Tournament	1	0
Chile U23	Total		4	0
Total career			7	0

== Honours ==
Chile U20

- South American Games Gold medal: 2018
