= Neneca (footballer, born 2003) =

Brazilian footballer

Personal information
- Full name: Hélio Miguel Júnior
- Date of birth: 27 August 2003 (age 23)
- Place of birth: Londrina, Brazil
- Height: 1.92 m (6 ft 4 in)
- Position: Goalkeeper

Team information
- Current team: Santa Clara
- Number: 12

Youth career
- Londrina

Senior career*
Years	Team	Apps	(Gls)
2022–2024	Londrina	27	(0)
2024–2025	Cascavel	10	(0)
2024–2025	→ Santa Clara (loan)	0	(0)
2025–	Santa Clara	0	(0)
- * Club domestic league appearances and goals as of 19:58, 17 November 2025 (UTC)

Hélio Miguel Júnior (born 27 August 2003), known as Neneca, is a Brazilian professional footballer who plays as a goalkeeper for Primeira Liga club Santa Clara.

== Club career ==
Neneca is a youth product of Londrina and started training with their senior team in 2021, before being promoted formally in 2022. He made his senior and professional debut with Londrina in a 2–1 Campeonato Brasileiro Série B loss to Atlético Goianiense on 8 May 2023. In March 2024, he moved to Cascavel in the Campeonato Brasileiro Série D. On 31 July 2024, he joined the Portuguese club Santa Clara on loan for a season as they returned to the Primeira Liga.

== Personal life ==
Neneca is the son of the former footballer Hélio Miguel, also nicknamed Neneca, who died in 2015.

== Career statistics ==
As of match played 18 December 2025

Appearances and goals by club, season and competition
Club	Season	League			State League		Cup		League Cup		Continental		Total	
Club	Season	Division	Apps	Goals	Apps	Goals	Apps	Goals	Apps	Goals	Apps	Goals	Apps	Goals
Londrina	2022	Série B	0	0	4	0	—		—		—		4	0
Londrina	2023	Série B	21	0	0	0	—		—		—		21	0
Londrina	2024	Série B	0	0	6	0	—		—		—		6	0
Londrina	Total		21	0	10	0	—		—		—		31	0
Cascavel	2024	Série D	10	0	—		—		—		—		10	0
Santa Clara (loan)	2024–25	Primeira Liga	0	0	—		3	0	0	0	—		3	0
Santa Clara	2025–26	Primeira Liga	0	0	—		2	0	—		—		2	0
Career total			31	0	10	0	5	0	0	0	0	0	46	0
