= Walter Tandazo =

Peruvian footballer (born 2000)

Personal information
- Full name: Walter Angello Tandazo Silva
- Date of birth: 14 June 2000 (age 26)
- Place of birth: Tumbes, Peru
- Height: 1.66 m (5 ft 5 in)
- Position: Midfielder

Team information
- Current team: FBC Melgar
- Number: 24

Youth career
- –2018: Alianza Lima
- 2018–2019: FBC Melgar

Senior career*
Years	Team	Apps	(Gls)
2019–	FBC Melgar	170	(1)

International career^{‡}
2015	Peru U15	0	(0)
2018–2019	Peru U20	5	(0)
- * Club domestic league appearances and goals as of 30 December 2025 ‡ National team caps and goals as of 05:00, 1 October 2020 (UTC)

Walter Angello Tandazo Silva (born 14 June 2000) is a Peruvian footballer who plays as a midfielder for FBC Melgar.

== Career statistics ==
=== Club ===
As of 31 January 2026.

Club	Division	League			Cup		Continental		Total	
Club	Division	Season	Apps	Goals	Apps	Goals	Apps	Goals	Apps	Goals
FBC Melgar	Liga 1	2019	11	0	2	0	1	0	14	0
FBC Melgar	Liga 1	2020	12	0	—		2	0	14	0
FBC Melgar	Liga 1	2021	21	0	1	0	7	0	29	0
FBC Melgar	Liga 1	2022	30	0	—		9	0	39	0
FBC Melgar	Liga 1	2023	33	1	—		4	0	37	1
FBC Melgar	Liga 1	2024	29	0	—		1	0	30	0
FBC Melgar	Liga 1	2025	34	0	—		10	0	44	0
FBC Melgar	Liga 1	2026	1	0	—		0	0	1	0
Career total			171	1	3	0	34	0	208	1

== Honours ==
FBC Melgar

- Torneo Apertura 2022
