= Luis Chiquillo =

Venezuelan footballer (born 1999)

Personal information
- Full name: Luis Daniel Chiquillo Ledesma
- Date of birth: 2 January 1999 (age 27)
- Place of birth: Caracas, Venezuela
- Height: 1.76 m (5 ft 9 in)
- Position: Midfielder

Senior career*
Years	Team	Apps	(Gls)
2017–2018	Atlético Venezuela	42	(0)
2019–2021	Monagas	32	(0)
2021	Carabobo	2	(0)
2021-2022	Jaguares	7	(0)

International career^{‡}
2018–2019	Venezuela U20	8	(0)
- * Club domestic league appearances and goals as of 14:11, 20 October 2019 (UTC) ‡ National team caps and goals as of 14:11, 30 January 2019 (UTC)

Luis Daniel Chiquillo Ledesma (born 2 January 1999) is a Venezuelan footballer as a midfielder.

== Career statistics ==
=== Club ===
As of 20 October 2019.

Club	Season	League			Cup		Continental		Other		Total	
Club	Season	Division	Apps	Goals	Apps	Goals	Apps	Goals	Apps	Goals	Apps	Goals
Atlético Venezuela	2017	Venezuelan Primera División	30	0	0	0	1 (Note: Appearances in the Copa Sudamericana)	0	0	0	31	0
Atlético Venezuela	2018	Venezuelan Primera División	12	0	1 (Note: Appearances in the Copa Venezuela)	0	–		0	0	13	0
Atlético Venezuela	Total		42	0	1	0	1	0	0	0	44	0
Monagas	2019	Venezuelan Primera División	17	0	1	0	2	0	0	0	20	0
Career total			59	0	2	0	3	0	0	0	64	0
