= Jeremy Aguirre =

Peruvian footballer (born 1999)

Personal information
- Full name: Jeremy Giordano Aguirre Miñán
- Date of birth: 20 February 1999 (age 27)
- Place of birth: Bellavista, Peru
- Height: 1.84 m (6 ft 0 in)
- Position: Goalkeeper

Team information
- Current team: Deportivo Llacuabamba
- Number: 1

Youth career
- Cantolao
- Esther Grande
- Sport Boys

Senior career*
Years	Team	Apps	(Gls)
2018–2020	Sport Boys	4	(0)
2019	→ Sport Loreto (loan)	8	(0)
2021	Deportivo Coopsol	14	(0)
2022	Deportivo Binacional	0	(0)
2023	Alianza Atlético	1	(0)
2024	Unión Huaral	0	(0)
2024	Tiro Nº 28		
2025–	Deportivo Llacuabamba	3	(0)

International career
2017	Peru U18		
2018	Peru U20	1	(0)
- * Club domestic league appearances and goals as of 15:03, 3 January 2026 (UTC)

Jeremy Giordano Aguirre Miñán (born 20 February 1999) is a Peruvian footballer who plays as a goalkeeper for Deportivo Llacuabamba.

== Career ==
=== Club career ===
As a youth player, Aguirre represented Cantolao and Esther Grande and joined Sport Boys in 2018. He started on the club's reserve team, where he quickly became the captain, but was also on the bench for two Peruvian Primera División games in his first season.

In the 2019 season, he was still playing for the reserve team. The club decided to let him go out on loan to Peruvian Segunda División club Sport Loreto in the summer 2019 for the rest of the season. He made 8 appearances for the team before returning to Sport Boys for the 2020 season. He left the club at the end of the year.

On 1 February 2021, Aguirre joined Segunda División club Deportivo Coopsol. After a year at Coopsol, Aguirre joined Deportivo Binacional in February 2022. A year later, ahead of the 2023 season, Aguirre joined Alianza Atlético.

In May 2024 he moved to Tiro Nº 28. In April 2025, he joined Deportivo Llacuabamba.

== International career ==
In April 2017, Aguirre was called up for the Peru U18 squad for the first time. He later also got his debut for Peru U20 on 14 November 2018 in a friendly game against Ecuador U20. Aguirre was also a part of the squad to play the 2019 South American U-20 Championship in January 2020, however, as an unused substitute.

== Career statistics ==
=== Club ===
As of match played 13 October 2020.

Club	Season	Division	League		Cup		Continental		Total	
Club	Season	Division	Apps	Goals	Apps	Goals	Apps	Goals	Apps	Goals
Sport Loreto	2019	Liga 2	8	0	0	0	—		8	0
Sport Boys	2020	Liga 1	4	0	—		—		4	0
Career total			12	0	0	0	0	0	12	0
