= Nicolás Fernández (footballer, born August 1999) =

Chilean footballer

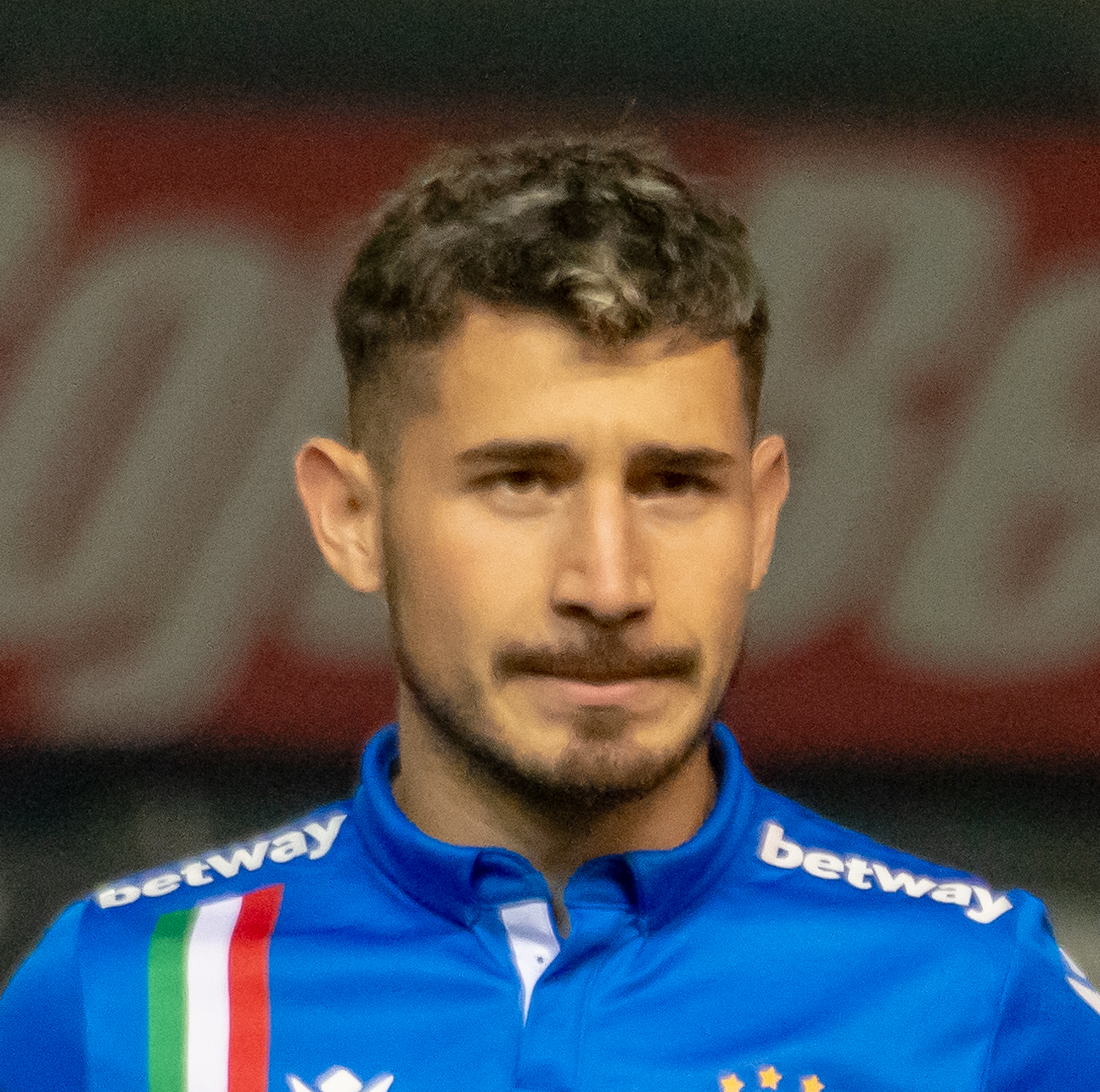
- Fernández with Audax Italiano in 2023

Personal information
- Full name: Nicolás Esteban Fernández Muñoz
- Date of birth: 3 August 1999 (age 27)
- Place of birth: San Joaquín, Santiago, Chile
- Height: 1.75 m (5 ft 9 in)
- Position: Defender

Team information
- Current team: Universidad de Chile
- Number: 6

Youth career
- 2011–2014: Universidad Católica
- 2015–2017: Audax Italiano

Senior career*
| Years | Team | Apps | (Gls) |
| 2017–2024 | Audax Italiano | 147 | (1) |
| 2025– | Universidad de Chile | 6 | (0) |

International career^{‡}
| 2016 | Chile U17 | 3 | (0) |
| 2018 | Chile U20 | 5 | (0) |
| 2019 | Chile U23 | 3 | (0) |
| 2024– | Chile | 3 | (0) |
Medal record
Men's football
Representing Chile
South American Games
| Gold medal – first place | 2018 Cochabamba |
- * Club domestic league appearances and goals as of 12 July 2025 ‡ National team caps and goals as of 25 June 2024

Nicolás Esteban Fernández Muñoz (born 3 August 1999) is a Chilean footballer who plays for Universidad de Chile and the Chile national team.

== Club career ==
As a youth player, Fernández was with Universidad Católica before joining Audax Italiano aged 15, making his professional debut in 2017.

In January 2025, Fernández signed with Universidad de Chile.

== International career ==
In 2016, Fernández represented Chile at under-17 level in the friendly tournament Copa UC.

At under-20 level, Fernández represented Chile in the 2018 South American Games, winning the gold medal.

At senior level, he received his first call up under Ricardo Gareca for the friendly matches against Albania and France in March 2024. He made his debut against Albania on 22 March 2024.

== Career statistics ==
=== International ===
As of match played 25 June 2024.

Appearances and goals by national team and year
| National team | Year | Apps | Goals |
|---|---|---|---|
| Chile | 2024 | 3 | 0 |
| Total | | 3 | 0 |

== Honours ==
Chile U20

- South American Games Gold medal: 2018
