= Anderson Soares da Silva =

Anderson Soares da Silva may refer to:

- Neneca (born 1980), Brazilian football goalkeeper
- Mazinho (footballer, born 1987), Brazilian football forward
