= Cristóbal Campos =

Chilean footballer (born 1999)

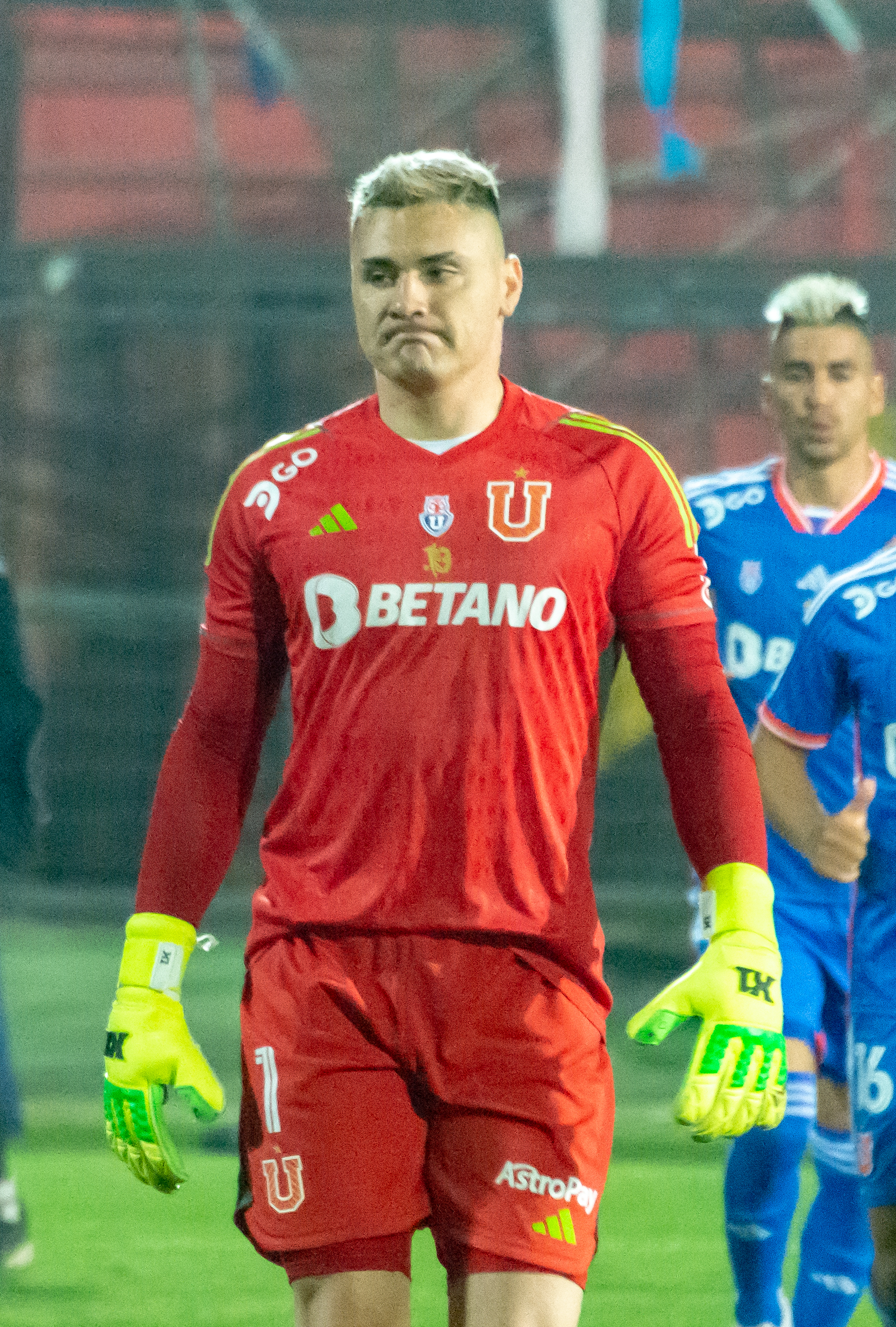
- Campos with Universidad de Chile in 2023.

Personal information
- Full name: Cristóbal Alejandro Campos Véliz
- Date of birth: 27 August 1999 (age 27)
- Place of birth: Lonquén, Chile
- Height: 1.87 m (6 ft 2 in)
- Position: Goalkeeper

Team information
- Current team: Unión Glorias Navales

Youth career
- Universidad de Chile
- 2017: → Alcanenense (loan)

Senior career*
Years	Team	Apps	(Gls)
2019–2023	Universidad de Chile	41	(0)
2024	San Antonio Unido	15	(1)
2026–	Unión Glorias Navales	–	(–)

International career
2019	Chile U20	0	(0)
2017–2023	Chile	1	(0)
- * Club domestic league appearances and goals as of 17 April 2026

Cristóbal Alejandro Campos Véliz (born 27 August 1999) is a Chilean footballer who plays as a goalkeeper for Unión Glorias Navales in the Tercera B.

== Club career ==
=== Universidad de Chile ===
A product of Universidad de Chile youth system, as a young player, in 2017 Campos was loaned to Portuguese club Alcanenense, in addition to a brief test step in Sporting CP.

Despite not making his debut in the Chilean Primera División, he played his first official match for Universidad de Chile in a 2020 Copa Libertadores game versus Inter de Porto Alegre on 11 February 2020. Campos was released on 28 December 2023, after being accused of domestic violence.

=== San Antonio Unido ===
On 20 March 2024, Campos joined San Antonio Unido in the Segunda División Profesional de Chile.

==== Car accident ====
Following playing for San Antonio Unido against Trasandino, Campos returned to Santiago and suffered a serious car accident in the Route CH-78 on 2 September 2024, where his car overturned and his right foot was partially amputated. His foot was finally rebuilt.

=== Return to play ===
In September 2025, Campos joined the Provincial Talagante trainings.

On 16 April 2026, Campos signed with Unión Glorias Navales from Viña del Mar in the Tercera B.

== International career ==
Campos was called up to the Chile U20 squad for the 2019 South American U-20 Championship, but he didn't play any match. Also, he was a substitute in the friendly match of the Chile senior team against Burkina Faso on 2 June 2017.

== Other works ==
In July 2025, Campos assumed as the president of seven-a-side football club Big Ballers in the Chilean championship Legends Cup.

On 31 October 2025, Campos was appointed as the sport manager of Provincial Talagante.
