= Alexander Bolaños =

Ecuadorian footballer

Personal information
- Place of birth: Esmeraldas, Ecuador
- Height: 1.78 m (5 ft 10 in)
- Position: Forward

Team information
- Current team: S.D. Aucas

Youth career
- –2015: Canteras del Jubones
- 2015: Anaconda FC
- 2016–2018: Colo-Colo

Senior career*
Years	Team	Apps	(Gls)
2018–2019	Colo-Colo	2	(0)
2019–2021	Águilas	1	(0)
2020	→ Barcelona SC (loan)	12	(0)
2022	Deportes Concepción	6	(2)
2023	Técnico Universitario	1	(0)
2024	Independiente del Valle	0	(0)

International career^{‡}
2019	Ecuador U20	4	(0)
2020–	Ecuador U23	2	(0)
- * Club domestic league appearances and goals as of 16 May 2022 ‡ National team caps and goals as of 15:37, 2 January 2021 (UTC)

Alexander Bolaños (real name: Jancer Romario Bolaños Cassiera; born 1994) is an Ecuadorian footballer who plays as a forward for Aucas in the Liga PRO Ecuador.

On 19 July 2024, the Ecuadorian Football Federation discovered that he falsified his identity and pretended to be his brother Alexander Bolaños Casierra. As a result, Jancer Bolaños (who is 30 years old instead of the originally claimed 24) was punished with a three-year suspension from football.

== Personal life ==
He is the cousin of Ecuadorian international footballers Miller Bolaños and Álex Bolaños.

== Career statistics ==
=== Club ===
As of 23 December 2018.

Club	Season	League			Cup		Continental		Other		Total	
Club	Season	Division	Apps	Goals	Apps	Goals	Apps	Goals	Apps	Goals	Apps	Goals
Colo-Colo	2018	Chilean Primera División	2	0	0	0	0	0	0	0	2	0
Career total			2	0	0	0	0	0	0	0	2	0
