= Neneca (footballer, born 1980) =

Brazilian footballer (1980–2025)

Personal information
- Full name: Anderson Soares da Silva
- Date of birth: 11 September 1980
- Place of birth: Rondonópolis, Mato Grosso, Brazil
- Date of death: 22 September 2025 (aged 45)
- Place of death: Rondonópolis, Mato Grosso, Brazil
- Height: 1.90 m (6 ft 3 in)
- Position: Goalkeeper

Senior career*
Years	Team	Apps	(Gls)
2002	Flamengo-SP		
2002	União São João		
2003	Flamengo-SP		
2004	Nacional-SP		
2004–2005	União Barbarense		
2005–2006	Pogoń Szczecin	4	(0)
2006	União		
2006–2007	Rio Branco-MG		
2007–2011	Santo André		
2010	→ Oeste (loan)		
2011–2013	América-MG	64	(0)
2013–2014	Figueirense	6	(0)
2014	Pierikos		
2015	Guarani		
2015–2017	Botafogo-SP	54	(0)
2017–2019	Santo André		
2019–2022	União Rondonópolis		
- * Club domestic league appearances and goals

Anderson Soares da Silva (11 September 1980 – 22 September 2025), known by the nickname Neneca, was a Brazilian professional footballer who played as a goalkeeper.

Neneca suffered a heart attack on 17 September 2025. He died in his hometown of Rondonópolis five days later, on 22 September, at the age of 45.

== Honours ==
União Barbarense

- Campeonato Brasileiro Série C: 2004

Santo André

- Campeonato Paulista Série A2: 2008

Figueirense

- Campeonato Catarinense: 2014

Botafogo-SP

- Campeonato Brasileiro Série D: 2015
